= Umzimkhulu Local Municipality elections =

Local elections in KwaZulu-Natal, South Africa

The Umzimkhulu Local Municipality council consists of forty-three members elected by mixed-member proportional representation. Twenty-two councillors are elected by first-past-the-post voting in twenty-two wards, while the remaining twenty-one are chosen from party lists so that the total number of party representatives is proportional to the number of votes received.

In the election of 4 November 2026 the African National Congress (ANC) lost its majority, but won a plurality of 21 seats on the council.

== Results ==
The following table shows the composition of the council after past elections.

Event	AIC	ANC	DA	EFF	IFP	UDM	MKP	Other	Total
2000 election	—	27	1	—	2	3	—	0	33
2006 election	—	33	0	—	1	2	—	0	36
2011 election	—	36	0	—	1	0	—	3	40
2016 election	1	38	1	2	1	—	—	0	43
2021 election	1	33	1	6	1	—	—	1	43
2026 election	—	21	1	2	2	—	15	2	43

== December 2000 election ==
The following table shows the results of the 2000 election.

Party	Ward			List			Total seats
Party	Votes	%	Seats	Votes	%	Seats	Total seats
African National Congress	20,980	79.81	17	21,333	81.03	10	27
United Democratic Movement	2,678	10.19	0	2,505	9.51	3	3
Inkatha Freedom Party	1,532	5.83	0	1,921	7.30	2	2
Independent candidates	1,078	4.10	0				0
Democratic Alliance	19	0.07	0	569	2.16	1	1
Total	26,287	100.00	17	26,328	100.00	16	33
Valid votes	26,287	97.40		26,328	97.70		
Invalid/blank votes	703	2.60		620	2.30		
Total votes	26,990	100.00		26,948	100.00		
Registered voters/turnout	55,674	48.48		55,674	48.40		

== March 2006 election ==
The following table shows the results of the 2006 election.

Party	Ward			List			Total seats
Party	Votes	%	Seats	Votes	%	Seats	Total seats
African National Congress	36,221	91.25	18	36,754	92.42	15	33
Inkatha Freedom Party	1,529	3.85	0	1,503	3.78	2	2
United Democratic Movement	1,264	3.18	0	1,321	3.32	1	1
Independent candidates	643	1.62	0				0
Democratic Alliance	39	0.10	0	192	0.48	0	0
Total	39,696	100.00	18	39,770	100.00	18	36
Valid votes	39,696	98.21		39,770	98.27		
Invalid/blank votes	724	1.79		699	1.73		
Total votes	40,420	100.00		40,469	100.00		
Registered voters/turnout	69,922	57.81		69,922	57.88		

== May 2011 election ==
The following table shows the results of the 2011 election.

Party	Ward			List			Total seats
Party	Votes	%	Seats	Votes	%	Seats	Total seats
African National Congress	41,263	87.86	19	43,121	91.56	17	36
National Freedom Party	1,844	3.93	0	1,804	3.83	2	2
Inkatha Freedom Party	898	1.91	0	735	1.56	1	1
Independent candidates	1,553	3.31	1				1
Democratic Alliance	673	1.43	0	567	1.20	0	0
Congress of the People	312	0.66	0	499	1.06	0	0
United Democratic Movement	165	0.35	0	257	0.55	0	0
African Christian Democratic Party	255	0.54	0	113	0.24	0	0
Total	46,963	100.00	20	47,096	100.00	20	40
Valid votes	46,963	97.75		47,096	98.46		
Invalid/blank votes	1,083	2.25		738	1.54		
Total votes	48,046	100.00		47,834	100.00		
Registered voters/turnout	77,292	62.16		77,292	61.89		

== August 2016 election ==
The following table shows the results of the 2016 election.

Party	Ward			List			Total seats
Party	Votes	%	Seats	Votes	%	Seats	Total seats
African National Congress	45,289	85.79	22	46,219	86.64	16	38
Economic Freedom Fighters	2,626	4.97	0	2,606	4.89	2	2
Democratic Alliance	1,865	3.53	0	1,845	3.46	1	1
African Independent Congress	323	0.61	0	1,513	2.84	1	1
Inkatha Freedom Party	718	1.36	0	685	1.28	1	1
Independent candidates	1,331	2.52	0				0
African People's Convention	434	0.82	0	290	0.54	0	0
Azanian People's Organisation	205	0.39	0	188	0.35	0	0
Total	52,791	100.00	22	53,346	100.00	21	43
Valid votes	52,791	97.43		53,346	97.19		
Invalid/blank votes	1,395	2.57		1,545	2.81		
Total votes	54,186	100.00		54,891	100.00		
Registered voters/turnout	92,362	58.67		92,362	59.43		

== November 2021 election ==
The following table shows the results of the 2021 election.

Party	Ward			List			Total seats
Party	Votes	%	Seats	Votes	%	Seats	Total seats
African National Congress	32,130	72.92	21	32,664	75.46	12	33
Economic Freedom Fighters	5,253	11.92	0	5,975	13.80	6	6
Independent candidates	4,126	9.36	1				1
Inkatha Freedom Party	1,002	2.27	0	1,444	3.34	1	1
Democratic Alliance	1,082	2.46	0	1,196	2.76	1	1
African Independent Congress	48	0.11	0	1,364	3.15	1	1
Abantu Batho Congress	151	0.34	0	242	0.56	0	0
African People's Convention	190	0.43	0	159	0.37	0	0
African Transformation Movement	82	0.19	0	243	0.56	0	0
Total	44,064	100.00	22	43,287	100.00	21	43
Valid votes	44,064	97.64		43,287	96.24		
Invalid/blank votes	1,066	2.36		1,690	3.76		
Total votes	45,130	100.00		44,977	100.00		
Registered voters/turnout	90,315	49.97		90,315	49.80		

=== By-elections from November 2021 ===
The following by-elections were held to fill vacant ward seats in the period since the election in November 2021.

Date	Ward	Party of the previous councillor	Party of the newly elected councillor
24 May 2023	12	African National Congress	African National Congress
19 June 2024	1	African National Congress	African National Congress

== November 2026 election ==
The following table shows the results of the 2026 election.

Party	Ward			List			Total seats
Party	Votes	%	Seats	Votes	%	Seats	Total seats
African National Congress	25,252	49.53	21	25,345	49.68	0	21
uMkhonto weSizwe Party	17,169	33.68	1	17,414	34.13	14	15
South African Communist Party	2,322	4.55	0	2,277	4.46	2	2
Inkatha Freedom Party	2,072	4.06	0	2,060	4.04	2	2
Economic Freedom Fighters	1,804	3.54	0	1,790	3.51	2	2
Democratic Alliance	1,112	2.18	0	1,182	2.32	1	1
Independent candidates	515	1.01	0				0
African People's Convention	209	0.41	0	202	0.40	0	0
African Transformation Movement	118	0.23	0	233	0.46	0	0
Afrika Mayibuye Movement	178	0.35	0	137	0.27	0	0
African Economic Freedom	87	0.17	0	150	0.29	0	0
National Freedom Party	111	0.22	0	101	0.20	0	0
Pan Africanist Congress of Azania	31	0.06	0	126	0.25	0	0
Total	50,980	100.00	22	51,017	100.00	21	43
Valid votes	50,980	98.22		51,017	98.26		
Invalid/blank votes	925	1.78		903	1.74		
Total votes	51,905	100.00		51,920	100.00		
Registered voters/turnout	98,126	52.90		98,126	52.91		
