= Mohokare Local Municipality elections =

Local elections in the Free State, South Africa

The Mohokare Local Municipality council consists of thirteen members elected by mixed-member proportional representation. Seven councillors are elected by first-past-the-post voting in seven wards, while the remaining six are chosen from party lists so that the total number of party representatives is proportional to the number of votes received.

In the 2026 South African municipal elections the African National Congress (ANC) lost its majority, but still held the most seats on the council with six.

== Results ==
The following table shows the composition of the council after past elections.

Event	ANC	DA	EFF	FF+	PAC	Other	Total
2000 election	8	1	—	—	1	0	10
2006 election	8	1	—	0	1	0	10
2011 election	9	2	—	0	0	0	11
2016 election	7	2	2	0	—	0	11
2021 election	8	1	2	1	—	1	13
2026 election	6	4	2	1	—	0	13

== December 2000 election ==
The following table shows the results of the 2000 election.

Party	Ward			List			Total seats
Party	Votes	%	Seats	Votes	%	Seats	Total seats
African National Congress	5,901	75.06	5	6,007	76.53	3	8
Democratic Alliance	1,164	14.81	0	1,172	14.93	1	1
Pan Africanist Congress of Azania	436	5.55	0	442	5.63	1	1
Alliance 2000+	151	1.92	0	228	2.90	0	0
Independent candidates	210	2.67	0				0
Total	7,862	100.00	5	7,849	100.00	5	10
Valid votes	7,862	96.83		7,849	96.72		
Invalid/blank votes	257	3.17		266	3.28		
Total votes	8,119	100.00		8,115	100.00		
Registered voters/turnout	14,725	55.14		14,725	55.11		

== March 2006 election ==
The following table shows the results of the 2006 election.

Party	Ward			List			Total seats
Party	Votes	%	Seats	Votes	%	Seats	Total seats
African National Congress	6,265	81.16	5	6,272	80.47	3	8
Democratic Alliance	797	10.33	0	753	9.66	1	1
Pan Africanist Congress of Azania	415	5.38	0	357	4.58	1	1
Freedom Front Plus	201	2.60	0	205	2.63	0	0
African Christian Democratic Party	16	0.21	0	116	1.49	0	0
United Democratic Movement	25	0.32	0	91	1.17	0	0
Total	7,719	100.00	5	7,794	100.00	5	10
Valid votes	7,719	97.75		7,794	97.63		
Invalid/blank votes	178	2.25		189	2.37		
Total votes	7,897	100.00		7,983	100.00		
Registered voters/turnout	16,469	47.95		16,469	48.47		

== May 2011 election ==
The following table shows the results of the 2011 election.

Party	Ward			List			Total seats
Party	Votes	%	Seats	Votes	%	Seats	Total seats
African National Congress	8,016	80.23	6	8,110	81.20	3	9
Democratic Alliance	1,322	13.23	0	1,293	12.95	2	2
Congress of the People	305	3.05	0	285	2.85	0	0
Pan Africanist Congress of Azania	171	1.71	0	156	1.56	0	0
Freedom Front Plus	121	1.21	0	129	1.29	0	0
United Residents Front	37	0.37	0	15	0.15	0	0
Independent candidates	19	0.19	0				0
Total	9,991	100.00	6	9,988	100.00	5	11
Valid votes	9,991	98.28		9,988	98.67		
Invalid/blank votes	175	1.72		135	1.33		
Total votes	10,166	100.00		10,123	100.00		
Registered voters/turnout	17,773	57.20		17,773	56.96		

== August 2016 election ==
The following table shows the results of the 2016 election.

Party	Ward			List			Total seats
Party	Votes	%	Seats	Votes	%	Seats	Total seats
African National Congress	6,481	64.45	6	6,632	66.10	1	7
Economic Freedom Fighters	1,642	16.33	0	1,667	16.62	2	2
Democratic Alliance	1,636	16.27	0	1,530	15.25	2	2
Freedom Front Plus				204	2.03	0	0
Independent candidates	151	1.50	0				0
Congress of the People	122	1.21	0				0
United Residents Front	24	0.24	0				0
Total	10,056	100.00	6	10,033	100.00	5	11
Valid votes	10,056	98.06		10,033	98.10		
Invalid/blank votes	199	1.94		194	1.90		
Total votes	10,255	100.00		10,227	100.00		
Registered voters/turnout	18,483	55.48		18,483	55.33		

== November 2021 election ==
The following table shows the results of the 2021 election.

Party	Ward			List			Total seats
Party	Votes	%	Seats	Votes	%	Seats	Total seats
African National Congress	4,893	55.84	6	5,650	65.20	2	8
Economic Freedom Fighters	1,569	17.90	0	1,704	19.66	2	2
Democratic Alliance	799	9.12	0	818	9.44	1	1
Independent candidates	1,074	12.26	1				1
Freedom Front Plus	382	4.36	0	384	4.43	1	1
United Independent Movement	17	0.19	0	60	0.69	0	0
United Residents Front	19	0.22	0	22	0.25	0	0
African Transformation Movement	10	0.11	0	28	0.32	0	0
Total	8,763	100.00	7	8,666	100.00	6	13
Valid votes	8,763	97.78		8,666	96.89		
Invalid/blank votes	199	2.22		278	3.11		
Total votes	8,962	100.00		8,944	100.00		
Registered voters/turnout	17,838	50.24		17,838	50.14		

== November 2026 election ==
The following table shows the results of the 2026 election.

Party	Ward			List			Total seats
Party	Votes	%	Seats	Votes	%	Seats	Total seats
African National Congress	4,953	46.97	5	4,962	47.00	1	6
Democratic Alliance	3,049	28.91	2	3,106	29.42	2	4
Economic Freedom Fighters	1,543	14.63	0	1,559	14.77	2	2
Freedom Front Plus	749	7.10	0	773	7.32	1	1
South African Communist Party	53	0.50	0	49	0.46	0	0
Independent candidates	88	0.83	0				0
African Transformation Movement	28	0.27	0	43	0.41	0	0
Afrika Mayibuye Movement	26	0.25	0	44	0.42	0	0
uMkhonto weSizwe Party	46	0.44	0				0
United Residents Front	10	0.09	0	22	0.21	0	0
Total	10,545	100.00	7	10,558	100.00	6	13
Valid votes	10,545	97.72		10,558	97.89		
Invalid/blank votes	246	2.28		228	2.11		
Total votes	10,791	100.00		10,786	100.00		
Registered voters/turnout	19,934	54.13		19,934	54.11		
