= 2021 South African municipal elections =

South African municipal elections which were held on 1 November 2021

- 1 November 2021

All councillors for all 8 metropolitan municipalities All councillors for all 205 local municipalities 40% of councillors for all 44 district municipalities
- Registered: 26,204,579
- Turnout: 45.79% (▼11.13pp)
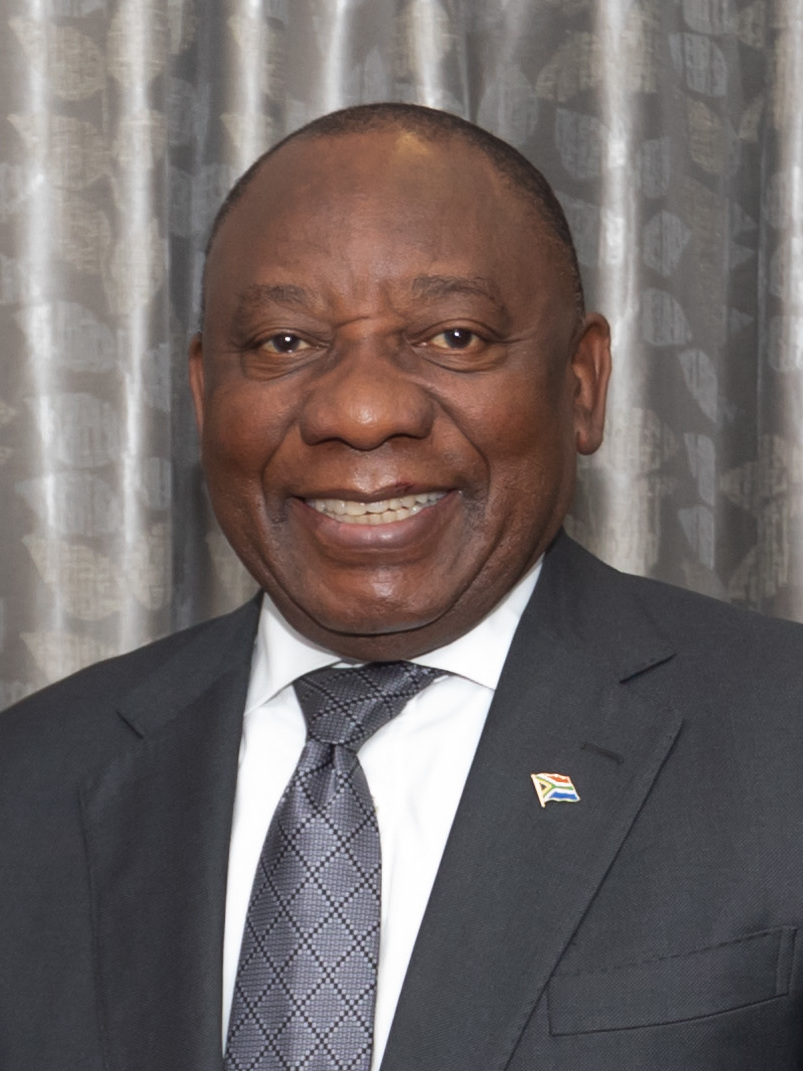

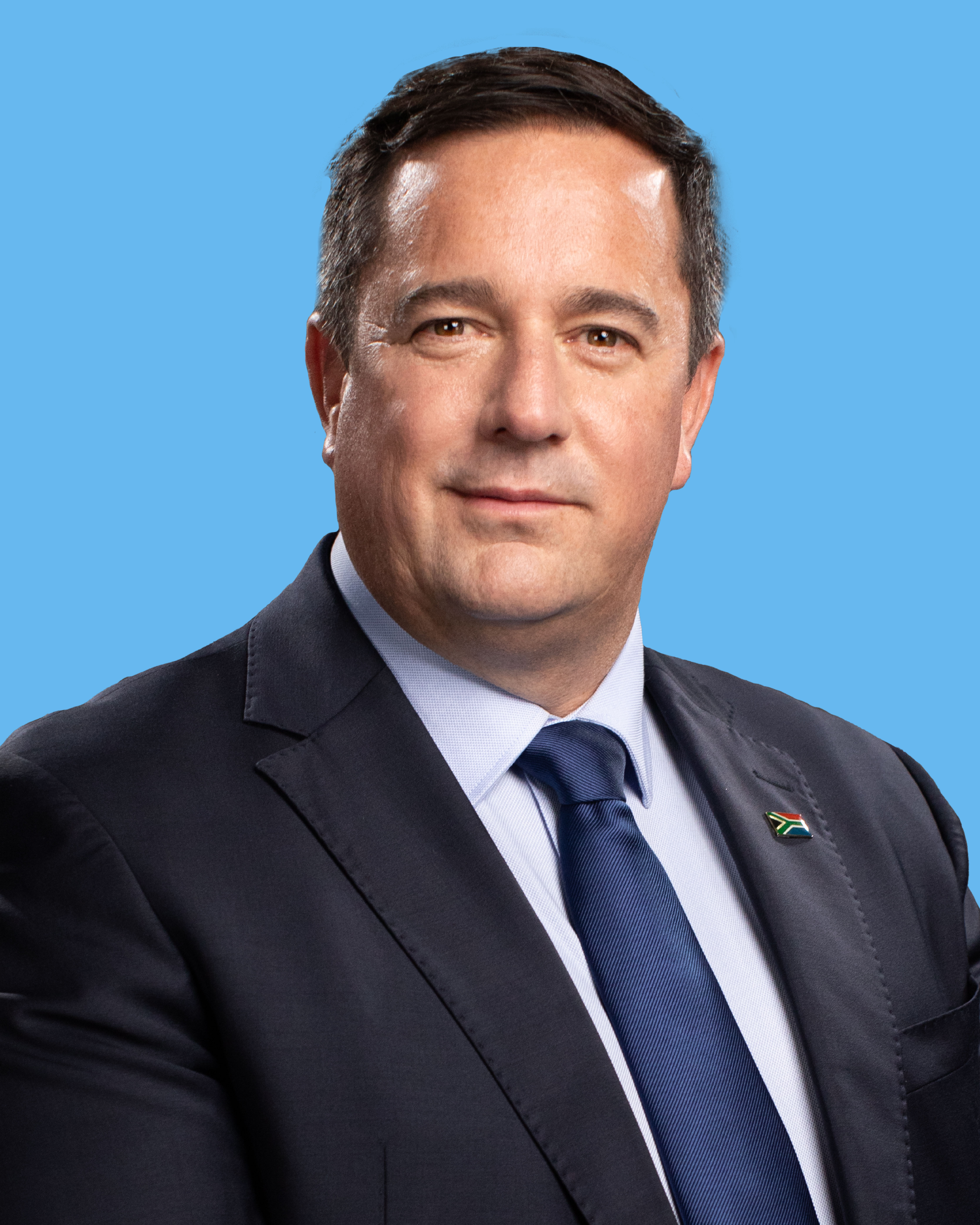

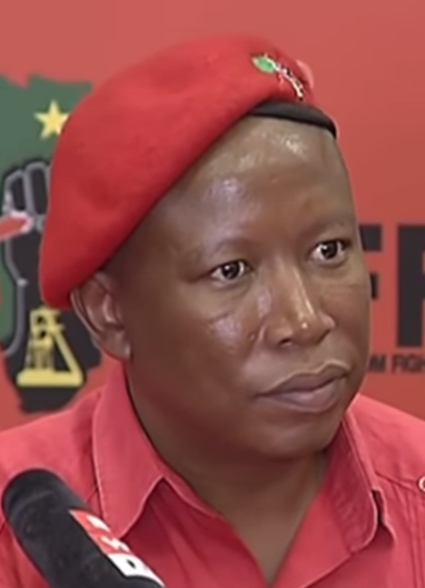

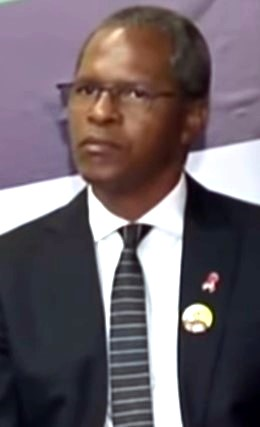

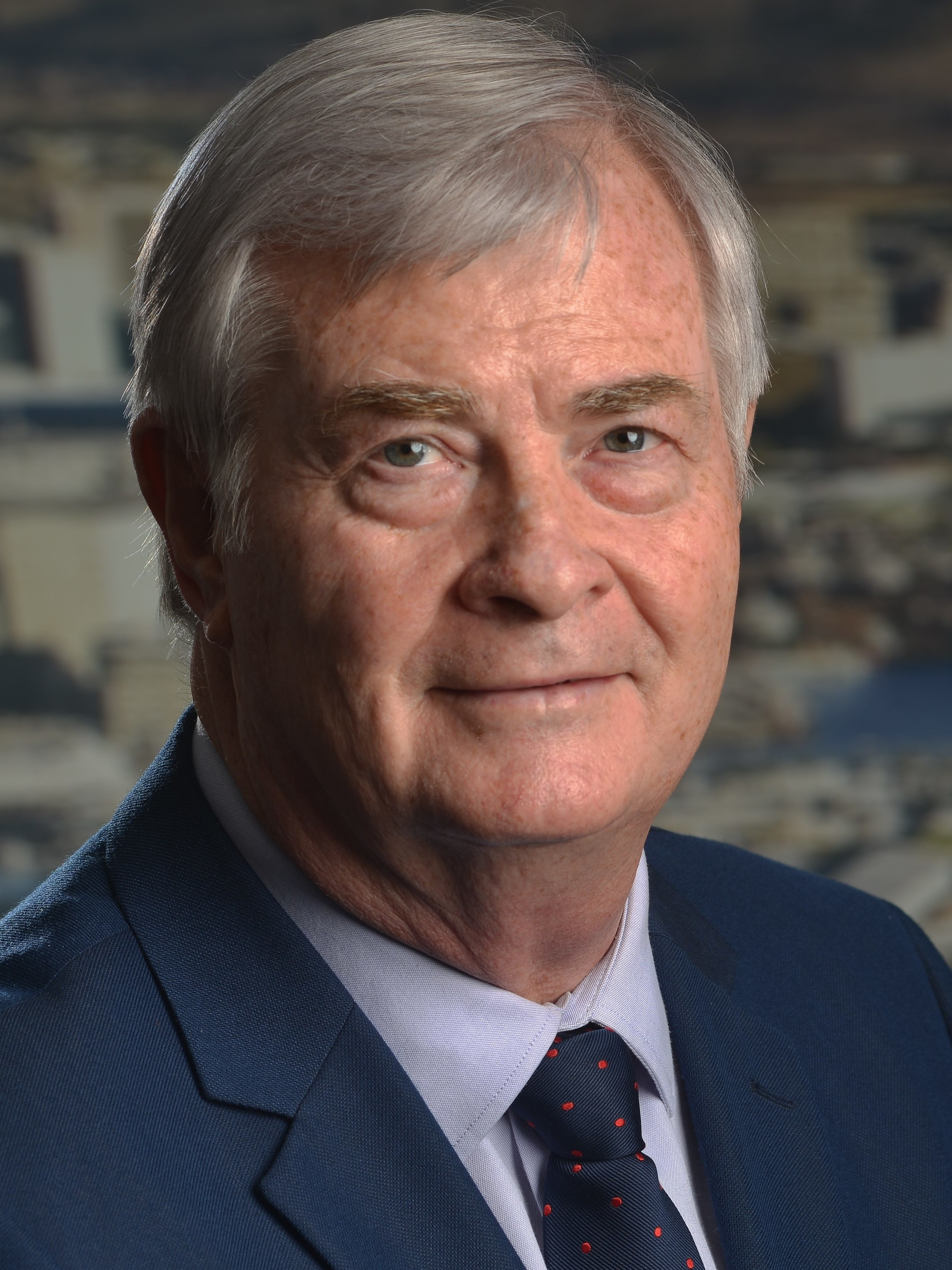

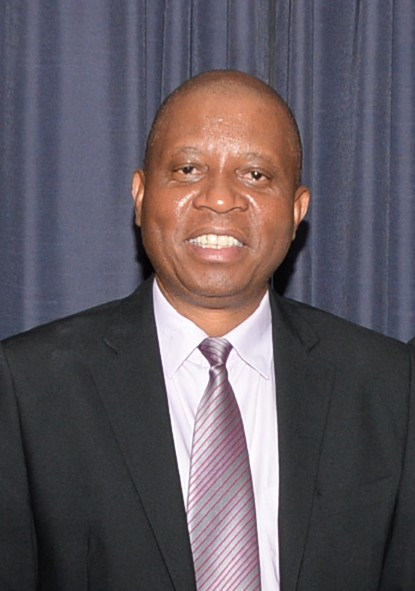
	First party	Second party	Third party
Leader	Cyril Ramaphosa	John Steenhuisen	Julius Malema
Party	ANC	DA	EFF
Popular vote	45.59%	21.62%	10.32%
Swing	▼8.32%	▼5.28%	▲2.13%
Councillors	4,545	1,414	980
Councillors ±	▼618	▼298	▲219
Municipalities	176	35	2
Municipalities ±	▼41	▲8	▲2
	Fourth party	Fifth party	Sixth party
Leader	Velenkosini Hlabisa	Pieter Groenewald	Herman Mashaba
Party	IFP	VF+	ActionSA
Popular vote	5.65%	2.34%	2.34%
Swing	▲1.4%	▲1.57%	▲2.34
Councillors	544	220	90
Councillors ±	▲112	▲153	▲90
Municipalities	29	0	0
Municipalities ±	▲16	Steady	Steady

The 2021 South African Municipal Elections were held on 1 November 2021, to elect councils for all district, metropolitan and local municipalities in each of the country's nine provinces. It was the 6th municipal election cycle held in South Africa since the end of apartheid in 1994, with the previous municipal elections having been held in 2016. On 21 April 2021, President Cyril Ramaphosa announced the elections to be held on Wednesday, 27 October 2021.

It had been recommend by Dikgang Moseneke to delay the municipal elections until 2022. The Electoral Commission of South Africa (IEC) requested the Constitutional Court to support the date postponement. The Economic Freedom Fighters (EFF) supported the date postponement while the Democratic Alliance (DA) was against the postponement of the date. The Constitutional Court dismissed the application to postpone the date until 2022, ruling that they had to take place between 27 October and 1 November.

On 9 September 2021, the Minister of Cooperative Governance and Traditional Affairs, Nkosazana Dlamini-Zuma announced that the elections would be held on 1 November.

The turnout of 45.79% of registered voters was the lowest in the history of South African democracy, down from 57.94% during the previous local election. The IEC put considerable effort into increasing voter registration and turnout for the 2026 South African municipal elections.

== Electoral system ==
Local government in South Africa consists of municipalities of various types. The largest metropolitan areas are governed by metropolitan municipalities, while the rest of the country is divided into district municipalities, each of which consists of several local municipalities. After the 2016 elections, there were eight metropolitan municipalities, 44 district municipalities and 205 local municipalities.

The councils of metropolitan and local municipalities are elected through a system of mixed-member proportional representation, in which half of the seats in each municipality are elected on the first-past-the-post system in single-member wards and the other half of the seats are allocated according to the proportional representation (PR) system. The latter takes into account the number of ward seats won by a party and ensures that the final number of seats held by that party is proportional to their percentage of the total vote.

District municipality councils are partly elected by proportional representation (DC 40% votes) and partly appointed by the councils of the constituent local municipalities (DC 60% votes). Voters in both metropolitan and local municipalities elect a single ward candidate as well as a proportional representative in their municipal council. Residents of municipalities that form part of district councils (that is, excluding metropolitan municipalities) also cast a third vote to elect a proportional representative for their district council in addition to the two votes they cast for their local council.

== Timeline ==
=== 31 October 2021 ===
8:00 – Special voting begins for the over 1.1 million individuals registered.

In Ward 93, Kusakusa Primary School, in Durban, KwaZulu-Natal, the IEC allegedly caught individuals committing electoral fraud. An investigation is currently underway regarding the matter.

=== 1 November 2021 ===
8:00 – Elections begin nationwide.

12:00 – A voting station in KwaZulu-Natal is set on fire.

13:00 – A Journalist is arrested and later released following a squabble at a voting station in Soweto.

14:00 – Protests break out in Soweto as President Cyril Ramaphosa makes his way to Chiawelo to cast his ballot.

15:00 – The IEC warns and advises individuals on taking pictures inside voting booths, citing time constraints.

15:30 – Residents dig trenches to bar IEC officials from entering a voting station in the Eastern Cape.

19:00 – Helen Zille is forcibly removed from a voting station in Bethelsdorp.

21:00 – Voting polls close.

== Political parties ==
There are 325 parties contesting the election.

The ruling African National Congress (ANC) has been the majority party in most municipalities across South Africa, with the exception of those in the Western Cape, since 1994. Its overall share of the vote decreased from 61.95% in 2011 to 53.91% in 2016 amid growing discontent regarding the state of the country's economy and perceived corruption within the organisation. The party lost many municipalities and support in the previous municipal elections, including the mayoralty and majority in councils such as Nelson Mandela Bay, Tshwane and Johannesurg. The party had to form coalitions to retain control of the City of Ekurhuleni and many other municipalities. The ANC has managed to gain back control in many municipalities through motions of no confidence. Although the party ousted the Democratic Alliance administration in Nelson Mandela Bay, the party voted to elect a mayor from the United Democratic Movement (UDM). The ANC was led by Jacob Zuma until he was replaced by Cyril Ramaphosa at the 57th National Conference in December 2017. Ramaphosa assumed the presidency in February 2018 and the ANC won the 2019 national elections with a slight decrease in the number of votes. The ANC regained control of the City of Johannesburg on 4 December 2019 following the election of its regional leader, Geoff Makhubo, to the mayoralty. The party voted to remove the UDM mayor of Nelson Mandela Bay on 5 December 2019. The party announced its election manifesto on 27 September 2021. Ramaphosa said that mayors would not be appointed based on popularity.

The official opposition Democratic Alliance (DA) increased its total share of the vote from 23.94% in 2011 to 26.90% in 2016. The party gained significant support and control of municipalities all across South Africa whilst assuming control of most Western Cape councils. In addition, the party gained three metropolitan municipalities from the ANC – Tshwane, Johannesburg and Nelson Mandela Bay. The party did increase its majority in City of Cape Town. The DA lost control of the Nelson Mandela Bay municipality in August 2018, after a motion of no confidence ousted the DA mayor Athol Trollip. The party's support decreased in the 2019 national elections. Following the national elections, the DA has shown a growing decrease in support in subsequent municipal by-elections. Mmusi Maimane resigned as DA leader in October 2019, and John Steenhuisen was elected as interim party leader in November 2019. The DA lost control of the City of Johannesburg in December 2019. Steenhuisen was elected leader of the party for a full term in November 2020. The DA launched their manifesto on 25 September 2021.

The Economic Freedom Fighters (EFF) is a splinter party of the ANC that was formed in July 2013 by expelled ANC Youth League leader, Julius Malema. The party was considered the kingmaker for the control of many councils in the aftermath of the 2016 municipal elections. The party increased their support in the 2019 national elections and is the second-largest party in three out of the nine provinces. The party launched its manifesto on 26 September 2021.

The Inkatha Freedom Party (IFP) saw an increase in their share of the vote in 2016 to just over 4 percent, which gave them control of 11 local municipalities and 2 district municipalities, they also co-govern Johannesburg as part of a coalition. The party was looking to build on their resurgence within their traditional stronghold of KwaZulu-Natal as well as make inroads in other provinces since, for the first time in their history, the party was led by a new president.

The Freedom Front Plus (FF Plus) won 0.8% of the vote (229,281 votes) in the 2016 municipal elections and formed a coalition to govern with the DA in Johannesburg, Tshwane and Hessequa. The party significantly increased their support in the 2019 general elections, winning 2.38% of the vote and just over 400,000 votes. In subsequent municipal by-elections, the party has won wards off the DA in the North West and increased their support in Gauteng and Limpopo. The party fielded candidates in 3,158 of the 4,468 wards in 184 of the 257 councils and sought to make inroads in the Western Cape by promising minority rights protection.

The National Freedom Party won 10.4% of the votes cast in KwaZulu-Natal province in 2011, including a majority of seats in the eDumbe Local Municipality and a plurality in Nongoma Local Municipality. The party was disqualified from participating in 2016 after failing to pay the election fee, but is hoping for a good result in KwaZulu-Natal. However, it experienced a setback with the death of its leader, Zanele kaMagwaza-Msibi, in September.

ActionSA was a new party, established by the former mayor of Johannesburg Herman Mashaba, which gained significant attention especially within the provinces of Gauteng and Kwazulu-Natal. The party gained influential former DA and ANC members.

Good was established by Patricia de Lille in 2018, and ran candidates in 1000 wards and 45 municipalities. It was particularly focused on the Western Cape, where it won 3% of the vote in the provincial legislature in the 2019 South African general election.

=== Pre-election coalition governments ===
The 2016 municipal elections resulted in many hung councils across South Africa. The ANC lost its council majority in four metropolitan municipalities – Tshwane, Johannesburg, Nelson Mandela Bay, City of Ekurhuleni. This consequently created an opportunity for opposition parties to form coalitions to achieve the mayoralties of these key municipalities. The EFF was essentially seen as the kingmaker and voted with the DA to install DA mayors in three out of the four metros and also in smaller local municipalities. The ANC managed to hold on to the City of Ekurhuleni through a coalition with smaller parties, and later won back the City of Johannesburg.

Eventually, through motions of no-confidence, the ANC managed to regain control of a select few municipalities. Even though an ANC-sponsored motion of no confidence removed the DA administration in Nelson Mandela Bay, the ANC voted for a United Democratic Movement (UDM) mayor.

In July 2019, the EFF announced that it would no longer support the DA or ANC in minority councils. The party made this announcement after the DA rejected their offer for co-governance in the Johannesburg and Tshwane metropolitan municipalities. The EFF sought the Tshwane mayoralty and MMCs in the Johannesburg Mayoral Committee and the DA declined the EFF's proposal, stating that they would rather prefer that the status quo remain.

== Campaign issues ==
Corruption and basic municipal management were significant campaign issues in the run up to the election. The ANC lead their election campaign with the slogan "We will do and be better" in recognition of the governing party's weak record in municipal governance whilst committing to improve. The DA campaigned on "get the basics right" and "getting things done" also in reference to the ANC's weak record in municipal government whilst the EFF used the slogan "Jobs and Land, Now!" in a continuation of its 2016 election slogan.

=== Municipal governance ===
The ANC pledged select and appoint better local representatives who are "committed to service delivery" and to "deliver services promptly and consistently." This included a commitment to implement lifestyle audits and signed performance contracts. The party also promised to minimize the impact of the South African energy crisis by stabilising the state energy provider's, Eskom, financial stability and increase the use of renewable energy.

The DA drew attention to their own track record of municipal management in comparison to the ANC's troubled record of local governance as a reason to vote for them. DA run municipalities such as Cape Town and George were given by the party as examples where they had to use their position in government to work to minimize the impact of the South African energy crisis on a local level, maintain infrastructure, and provide affordable mass transportation services.

The EFF promised to implement a property wealth tax to subsidise indigent families, a land audit to help reduce land hunger, and expanded use renewable energy and localised waste water recycling. The IFP promised to provide an alternative to what they described as the "ANC's failure to govern" by requiring IFP representatives individually pledge to govern with integrity. The GOOD party pledged to increase municipal investment in informal settlements, support higher density housing, reduce property speculation, abolish e-tolls, and encourage municipalities to increase their use of renewable energy. ActionSA promised equitable rates and free basic services for indigent households whilst cutting unnecessary costs in local government, reducing illegal electrical connections, and keeping public spaces clean. The Freedom Front Plus promised to end Affirmative Action in municipalities and to do an audit on all municipal employees' qualifications to ensure that they are qualified for their jobs. Party leader Pieter Groenewald said that all appointments should be made on merit. The party advocated for the decentralisation of municipalities, as Groenewald alleged that the amalgamation of municipalities had weakened service delivery.

=== Corruption ===
The ANC stated that they would "spare no effort in rooting out corruption" and committed to implement the Anti-corruption Strategy under the Justice and Crime Prevention Cluster, SARS Anti-Corruption Unit. The DA promised to eliminate corruption by adopting and applying "best practice in good governance," end the practice of cadre deployment, and appoint professional government officials; the party also highlighted the relatively high number of clean audits DA-run municipalities have received in the Western Cape. The EFF has proposed setting up corruption hotlines and compensating whistleblowers. The IFP promised to reduce corruption by establishing a specialised corruption court. GOOD party also promised to end cadre deployment and prosecute corrupt politicians. ActionSA promised to appoint ethical public officials, introduce lifestyle audits and minimum turnaround times on service delivery issues.

=== Decentralisation ===
Political parties debated and campaigned on the issue of decentralising power away from the national government towards local authorities, this is most pronounced in the Western Cape province. The DA wants policing, electricity generation, taxation and rail control decentralised to the province, on the other hand the ANC wants to centralise what control local authorities have over policing to national government. Other parties such as the FF+, Cape Coloured Congress and Cape Independence Party (CIP) explicitly campaigned on a tickets of outright independence for the Western Cape province. The DA has stated it supports the right to hold a referendum to Western Cape independence but does not support independence itself. Parties opposed to this call include the ANC, EFF, Al-Jam-ah and GOOD.

=== Economy ===
The ANC promised to reduce youth unemployment and increase educational opportunities whilst strengthening social security for vulnerable groups and expanding mass employment programs. The DA stated that they would encourage economic growth in DA run municipalities by increasing the ease of doing business in them and reducing excessive bureaucracy. The EFF pledged to set up municipal level special economic zones to encourage economic growth, support street vendors and black-owned farms. The IFP committed to delivering jobs and enhance food security. GOOD promised to provide policy certainty for investors whilst reducing excessive bureaucracy for businesses. ActionSA promised to repeal restrictive legislation, support youth employment, and implement a property audit to identify and reuse abandoned or stolen buildings. The FF Plus promised to provide land in industrial areas to people who want to start businesses, free of charge and that local businesses must be preferred when it came to tenders.

=== Crime ===
The ANC repeated previous election commitments to fight gender based violence, reduce drug abuse and focus on crime reduction in high crime urban areas. The DA promised to reduce crime by expanding investment in localised law enforcement in DA run municipalities whilst focusing on the causes of crime. The IFP committed to working with traditional leaders to provide better security to communities.

== Target municipalities ==
Following the 2019 general elections, political parties started to strategise and plan their 2021 municipal elections campaigns.

=== City of Cape Town ===
The African National Congress in the Western Cape announced after the 2019 election results were released, that the results were a platform for the party to retake control of the City of Cape Town. The ANC lost control of the metropolitan municipality in 2006. The results also showed that smaller political parties had made inroads in the city's suburbs and communities. Notable issues campaigned on in the Cape Town mayoral election was the provision of public housing, public safety, and local solutions to the South African energy crisis.

The Democratic Alliance's support in the city dropped. In the national election, the party declined with six percentage points, obtaining only 53%, compared to 59% in the 2014 elections. The party's support decreased from the 67% it had achieved in the 2016 municipal elections to only 56% in the provincial election.

The newly established political party Good, led by former DA mayor Patricia de Lille, and the Economic Freedom Fighters both earned some support in the city.

In April 2021, the DA announced that current mayor Dan Plato, Western Cape provincial leader Bonginkosi Madikizela, and shadow finance minister Geordin Hill-Lewis had applied to be the party's mayoral candidate. Madikizela later resigned as provincial leader and from all active party roles and dropped out of the selection process, following a scandal over his qualifications. Hill-Lewis was considered the front-runner for the position. On 23 August 2021, DA leader John Steenhuisen announced Hill-Lewis as the party's candidate for mayor.

On 22 August 2021, Good Secretary-General and Member of the Western Cape Provincial Parliament, Brett Herron, was announced as the party's mayoral candidate for the metro.

The VF Plus nominated former ID, DA and ANC member Lennit Max as its candidate for mayor. Community activist Marvin Sampson from Mitchells Plain was the Patriotic Alliance's mayoral candidate.

Former Capetonian spokesperson and Cape Coloured Congress leader Fadiel Adams also ran for mayor, while the Spectrum National Party selected Christopher Claassen as the party's mayoral candidate for the city.

=== eThekwini ===
In the 2019 general elections, the African National Congress declined in the metropolitan municipality, centred around Durban. In the provincial election, the ANC's support decreased by 11 percentage points compared to 2014 results, and 10 percentage points in the national election. The DA's support in the city remained relatively stable. The decline of the ANC can be attributed to the strong showing of the EFF and the resurgence of the Inkatha Freedom Party. Controversial ANC mayor Zandile Gumede resigned as mayor in 2019 and was replaced with Mxolisi Kaunda. Makhosi Khoza stood as the ActionSA candidate for mayor.

=== Tshwane ===
Following the general elections in 2014, the DA received more votes than the then-ruling ANC in the municipality. Analysts at the time suggested that the ANC would lose its majority in 2016.

The Democratic Alliance achieved a plurality of votes in the metropolitan municipality in the 2016 municipal elections. The party formed a coalition with smaller parties that were supported by the EFF. DA Gauteng Provincial Legislature Member Solly Msimanga was elected mayor. Msimanga resigned in February 2019 and was succeeded by DA Member of Parliament Stevens Mokgalapa. In the 2019 elections, the party had a dismal showing and only received 29.52% of the provincial vote in the municipality, even though former mayor Msimanga was the party's premier candidate. The party's support was even lower on the national vote. The ANC regained lost ground, while the EFF made gains. Following the elections, the EFF proposed that the party should co-govern with the DA in the Johannesburg and Tshwane metropolitan municipalities. The DA rejected the EFF's proposal, which led to the EFF withdrawing its support from the DA in all minority councils.

Mokgalapa was removed as mayor via a motion of no-confidence on 5 December 2019, but the Gauteng High Court later suspended his removal. However, he announced his resignation as mayor in February 2020. The DA had selected former MMC for Economic Development and Spatial Planning Randall Williams as its preferred mayoral candidate for the city. On 5 March 2020, the Tshwane Metro Municipality was placed under administration by the Gauteng Provincial Government and the council was consequently dissolved. A new council was supposed to be elected. The DA took the matter to court. On 29 April 2020, the North Gauteng High Court overturned the decision by the provincial government. On 7 May, the ANC lodged an appeal against the judgement. After months of legal challenges, the Supreme Court of Appeal overturned the provincial government's decision on 27 October 2020. Soon after, the DA's Randall Williams was elected mayor. Williams was up against MMC for shared services Sylvester Phokoje for the DA's mayoral candidate position. On 23 August 2021, Williams was announced as the DA's mayoral candidate for the metro in the 2021 local government elections.

Also contesting the mayoralty were Sarah Mabotsa of the Good party and Abel Tau of ActionSA.

=== City of Johannesburg ===
The ANC lost control of the City of Johannesburg in 2016, and the Democratic Alliance's mayoral candidate Herman Mashaba assumed the mayoralty. He held the position until he stepped down in 2019. The election for the mayor was held on 4 December 2019. The DA nominated Finance MMC Funzela Ngobeni to succeed Mashaba, while the ANC nominated its regional chair Geoff Makhubo. The EFF designated Musa Novela as its candidate. Makhubo won the election, marking the return of the ANC to the city's executive since its removal in 2016.

Mashaba subsequently announced that he would be running for mayor again under the banner of his new party, ActionSA. Makhubo died on 9 July 2021 and Eunice Mgcina was appointed acting mayor. Former Finance MMC Jolidee Matongo was elected mayor on 10 August 2021. The city lost its mayor for a second time in short sequence, when Matongo was involved in a fatal car accident on 18 September.

DA caucus leader Leah Knott and former MMC for Social Development Dr Mpho Phalatse applied to be the DA's mayoral candidate for the city. On 23 August 2021, Phalatse was announced as the DA's mayoral candidate. Lloyd Phillips was the Good party candidate for mayor.

=== Nelson Mandela Bay ===
After the 2016 elections, the DA was the largest party in this previously ANC-controlled metro, but without a majority. Athol Trollip of the DA was elected mayor with the support of smaller parties. He remained in office until he was narrowly voted out in 2018, after a vote of no confidence. ANC and other parties then elected Mongameli Bobani of the United Democratic Movement as the new mayor. He was, in turn, removed in December 2019 by an overwhelming majority through a vote supported by almost all parties in the council.

After a long period with interim leadership, Nqaba Bhanga of the DA was elected mayor of Nelson Mandela Bay in December 2020. He has been nominated by the DA as the party's mayoral candidate for the metro municipality in the 2021 local government elections.

On 13 September, Good announced Lawrence Troon as their candidate for mayor.

== Opinion polling ==
Polling Organisation	Fieldwork Date	Sample Size	ANC	DA	EFF	ActionSA	ACDP	IFP	FF+	Other Parties	Don't Know (Note: Includes Abstention, Other answers and No answer responses)	None	Lead
Ipsos	16–20 August 2021	1,501	49.3%	17.9%	14.5%	1.5%	1.5%	1.4%	1.2%	n/a	n/a	n/a	31.4%
eNCA/Ipsos	9–15 October 2021	1,346	36.8%	17.1%	8.2%	1.8%	0.5%	2.8%	0.9%	6.4%	25.5%	n/a	19.7%
eNCA/Ipsos	23–27 October 2021	1,672	30.0%	16.7%	10.2%	2.5%	0.6%	1.3%	1.1%	6.6%	31.0%	n/a	13.3%

== Voter turnout ==
An IEC statement indicated that by 6pm on election day, only 8 million of the 26.2 million registered voters had cast their ballot, the lowest turnout in 27 years, at around only 30.52%, compared to a 2016 voter turnout of 57%. The final figure remained at a record-low of 45.87%.

== Results ==
Elections began 7:00 SAST for the general public and closed 21:00 SAST. All vote counting was concluded and results were announced on 4 November.

=== National results by party ===
Party	Ward		PR		Ward + PR		DC		Total		change	
Party	Votes	%	Votes	%	Votes	%	Votes	%	Votes	%	% 2016	% Change
African National Congress	5,291,101	45.06 %	5,402,792	46.12 %	10,693,893	45.59 %	3,838,015	53.84 %	14,531,908	47.52 %	55.65%	▼8.13%
Democratic Alliance	2,527,862	21.53 %	2,543,764	21.72 %	5,071,626	21.62 %	995,803	13.97 %	6,067,429	19.84 %	24.57%	▼4.73%
Economic Freedom Fighters	1,193,985	10.17 %	1,225,445	10.46 %	2,419,430	10.32 %	804,398	11.28 %	3,223,828	10.54 %	8.31%	▲2.23%
Inkatha Freedom Party	638,963	5.44 %	685,942	5.86 %	1,324,905	5.65 %	591,265	8.29 %	1,916,170	6.27 %	4.73%	▲1.54%
Freedom Front Plus	276,136	2.35 %	273,213	2.33 %	549,349	2.34 %	161,056	2.26 %	710,405	2.32 %	0.80%	▲1.50%
ActionSA	241,735	2.06%	306,127	2.61%	547,862	2.34%	8,816	0.12%	556,678	1.82%	–	▲1.82%
Patriotic Alliance	111,811	0.95 %	114,736	0.98 %	226,547	0.97 %	38,401	0.54 %	264,948	0.87 %	0.06 %	▲0.81%
African Christian Democratic Party	92,232	0.79%	93,161	0.80%	185,393	0.79%	32,234	0.45%	217,627	0.71%	0.39%	▲0.32%
African Transformation Movement	63,531	0.54 %	70,874	0.61 %	134,405	0.57 %	55,509	0.78 %	189,914	0.62 %	–	▲0.62%
Good	75,937	0.65 %	74,144	0.63 %	150,081	0.64 %	35,186	0.49 %	185,267	0.61 %	–	▲0.61%
National Freedom Party	56,950	0.49 %	61,074	0.52 %	118,024	0.50 %	52,592	0.74 %	170,616	0.56 %	0.01 %	▲0.55% (Note: National Freedom Party did not contest the 2016 election, in the 2011 election NFP received 2.58%)
United Democratic Movement	50,902	0.43 %	60,303	0.51 %	111,205	0.47 %	46,508	0.65 %	157,713	0.52 %	0.62%	▼0.10%
African Independent Congress	42,426	0.36%	72,972	0.62%	115,398	0.49%	31,244	0.44%	146,642	0.48%	0.87%	▼0.39%
Forum for Service Delivery	23,585	0.20 %	29,573	0.25 %	53,158	0.23 %	28,798	0.40 %	81,956	0.27 %	0.23%	▲0.04%
Pan Africanist Congress of Azania	24,021	0.20 %	32,302	0.28 %	56,323	0.24 %	12,613	0.18 %	68,936	0.23 %	0.19%	▲0.04%
MAP16 Civic Movement	22,970	0.20 %	22,627	0.19 %	45,597	0.19 %	22,905	0.32 %	68,502	0.22 %	–	▲0.22%
Congress of the People	21,012	0.18 %	26,497	0.23 %	47,509	0.20 %	15,047	0.21 %	62,556	0.20 %	0.48%	▼0.28%
Al Jama-ah	29,393	0.25 %	25,914	0.22 %	55,307	0.24 %	5,882	0.08 %	61,189	0.20%	0.10%	▲0.10%
African People's Convention	23,416	0.20 %	21,270	0.18 %	44,686	0.19 %	14,294	0.20 %	58,980	0.19 %	0.22%	▼0.03%
Independent South African National Civic Organisation	12,164	0.10 %	17,060	0.15 %	29,224	0.12 %	17,556	0.25 %	46,780	0.15 %	–	▲0.15%
African People's Movement	14,028	0.12 %	13,317	0.11 %	27,345	0.12 %	12,661	0.18 %	40,006	0.13 %	–	▲0.13%
Defenders of the People	13,976	0.12 %	13,542	0.12 %	27,518	0.12 %	4,176	0.06 %	31,694	0.10 %	–	▲0.10%
United Independent Movement	14,315	0.12 %	13,542	0.12 %	30,405	0.13 %	1,038	0.01 %	31,443	0.10 %	–	▲0.10%
Independent Civic Organisation of South Africa	10,600	0.09 %	10,673	0.09 %	21,273	0.09 %	9,775	0.14 %	31,048	0.10 %	0.11%	▼0.01%
Tsogang Civic Movement	9,095	0.08 %	9,842	0.08 %	18,937	0.08 %	9,677	0.14 %	28,614	0.09 %	–	▲0.09%
Team Sugar South Africa	8,896	0.08 %	9,365	0.08 %	18,261	0.08 %	9,461	0.13 %	27,722	0.09 %	–	▲0.09%
United Christian Democratic Party	7,862	0.07 %	10,885	0.09 %	18,747	0.08 %	7,636	0.11 %	26,383	0.09 %	0.07%	▲0.02%
Africa Restoration Alliance	12,777	0.11 %	9,999	0.09%	22,776	0.10 %	3,264	0.05%	26,040	0.09 %	–	▲0.09%
Justice and Employment Party	7,703	0.07 %	9,634	0.08 %	17,337	0.07 %	7,906	0.11 %	25,243	0.08 %	–	▲0.08%
Plaaslike Besorgde Inwoners	6,631	0.06 %	6,486	0.06 %	13,117	0.06 %	6,446	0.09 %	19,563	0.06 %	0.02 %	▲0.04%
Azanian People's Organisation	6,720	0.06%	6,853	0.06%	13,573	0.06%	4,171	0.06%	17,744	0.06%	0.07%	▼0.01%
Independent Alliance	6,571	0.06 %	6,545	0.06 %	13,116	0.06 %	5,891	0.08 %	19,007	0.06 %	–	▲0.06%
Cape Independence Party	7,616	0.06 %	7,448	0.06 %	15,064	0.06 %	2,817	0.04 %	17,881	0.06 %	–	▲0.06%
Setsoto Service Delivery Forum	5,597	0.06 %	5,542	0.06 %	11,139	0.05 %	5,605	0.08 %	16,744	0.05 %	–	▲0.05%
Namakwa Civic Movement	4,909	0.04 %	5,159	0.04 %	10,068	0.04 %	5,093	0.07 %	15,161	0.05 %	–	▲0.05 %
Independent	405,847	3.46 %	N/A		405,847	1.73 %	N/A		405,847	1.33 %	0.89%	▲0.44%
Total	11,741,055	100 %	11,714,127	100 %	23,455,182	100 %	7,128,139	100 %	30,583,321	100 %	38,524,059	▼7,940,738

- PR = Proportional Representation
- DC = District Council

=== Results by Municipal Type ===
Map showing the party holding the largest number of seats in each municipality. A darker colour indicates an absolute majority, while a lighter colour indicates a plurality. Diagonal stripes indicate that two parties are tied for the lead. ANC majority ANC plurality DA majority DA plurality IFP majority IFP plurality NFP plurality ICOSA plurality

The statistics in this section are all sourced from the Independent Electoral Commission's official website unless specified otherwise. Prior control statistics from news sources.

Metropolitan Municipalities

Party	Type of Control	Prior	New Control	Change
African National Congress	ANC majority	3	2	▼1
African National Congress	ANC coalition	2	2	0
African National Congress	Total	5	4	▼1
Democratic Alliance	DA majority	1	1	0
Democratic Alliance	DA coalition	1	2	▲1
Democratic Alliance	DA minority	1	1	0
Democratic Alliance	Total	3	4	▲1

District Municipalities

Party	Type of Control	Prior	New Control	Change
African National Congress	ANC majority	37	26	▼11
African National Congress	ANC coalition	1	3	▲2
African National Congress	ANC minority	1	2	▲1
African National Congress	Total	39	31	▼8
Democratic Alliance	DA majority	4	3	▼1
Democratic Alliance	DA coalition	0	1	▲1
Democratic Alliance	DA minority	0	2	▲1
Democratic Alliance	Total	4	6	▲2
Inkatha Freedom Party	IFP majority	0	1	▲1
Inkatha Freedom Party	IFP coalition	0	1	▲1
Inkatha Freedom Party	IFP minority	2	3	▲1
Inkatha Freedom Party	Total	2	5	▲3
Economic Freedom Fighters	EFF minority	0	1	▲1
Economic Freedom Fighters	Total	0	1	▲1

Local Municipalities

Party	Control	Prior	New Control	Change
African National Congress	ANC majority	159	120	▼39
African National Congress	ANC coalition	13	9	▼4
African National Congress	ANC minority	1	15	▲14
African National Congress	Total	173	141	▼29
Democratic Alliance	DA majority	16	11	▼5
Democratic Alliance	DA coalition	2	8	▲6
Democratic Alliance	DA minority	2	6	▲4
Democratic Alliance	Total	20	25	▲5
Inkatha Freedom Party	IFP majority	6	9	▲3
Inkatha Freedom Party	IFP coalition	0	3	▲3
Inkatha Freedom Party	IFP minority	5	12	▲7
Inkatha Freedom Party	Total	11	24	▲13
Economic Freedom Fighters	EFF minority	0	1	▲1
Economic Freedom Fighters	Total	0	1	▲1
National Freedom Party	NFP coalition	0	1	▲1
National Freedom Party	Total	0	1	▲1
Minor Parties	Cederberg First Residents Association coalition	0	1	▲1
Minor Parties	ICOSA coalition	1	0	▼1
Minor Parties	Namakwa Civic Movement coalition	0	1	▲1
Minor Parties	Siyathemba Community Movement	0	1	▲1
Minor Parties	MAPSixteen Civic Movement minority	0	1	▲1
Minor Parties	Lekwa Community Forum minority	0	1	▲1
Minor Parties	Independent minority	0	1	▲1
Minor Parties	Kareeberg Civic Movement	0	1	▲1
Minor Parties	Total	1	7	▲6

=== Results by Province ===
==== Eastern Cape ====
In the following table, green rows indicate those won by the ANC with a majority, blue rows indicate municipalities won by the DA with a majority, and light blue rows indicate a DA minority, light green cells indicate municipalities won by the ANC with Minorities or coalitions.

===== Metropolitan Municipalities =====
The ANC held onto overall control of Buffalo City Metropolitan Municipality. In Nelson Mandela Bay ANC regained control through a coalition with minor parties.

Metropolitan Municipalities
Municipality	ANC	DA	EFF	Others	Total	Prior Control	New Control
Buffalo City	61	20	13	6	100	ANC majority	ANC majority
Nelson Mandela Bay	48	48	8	16	120	DA-UDM-COPE-ACDP coalition	ANC-PA-GOOD-AIM-UDM-DOP-Northern Alliance-PAC coalition

===== Two Tier Municipalities =====
The ANC held onto overall control of 5 District Municipalities. ANC maintained control of Sarah Baartman District Municipality through minority administration. The ANC held onto overall control of 28 Local Municipalities and minority control over 1. The DA held onto overall control of 1 local municipality and coalition of a second one.

Two Tier Municipalities
District Municipality	Local Municipality	ANC	ATM	DA	EFF	UDM	Others	Total	Prior Control	New Control
Sarah Baartman									ANC majority	ANC minority (in doubt)
	Dr Beyers Naudé	11	0	10	1	0	2	24	ANC majority	DA-CSA-VF+ coalition
	Blue Crane Route	6	0	4	1	0	0	11	ANC majority	ANC majority
	Makana	14	0	5	2	0	6	27	ANC majority	ANC majority
	Ndlambe	11	0	6	3	0	0	20	ANC majority	ANC majority
	Sundays River Valley	10	0	4	1	0	1	16	ANC majority	ANC majority
	Kouga	11	0	16	1	0	2	29	DA majority	DA majority
	Kou-Kamma	6	0	3	0	0	3	12	ANC majority	ANC coalition
Amathole		36	0	3	5	2	1	47	ANC majority	ANC majority
	Mbhashe	45	1	1	4	8	4	63	ANC majority	ANC majority
	Mnquma	45	2	1	5	5	5	62	ANC majority	ANC majority
	Great Kei	9	0	3	1	0	0	13	ANC majority	ANC majority
	Amahlathi	23	0	3	2	0	2	30	ANC majority	ANC majority
	Ngqushwa	18	0	1	3	0	1	23	ANC majority	ANC majority
	Raymond Mhlaba	33	0	3	3	0	3	46	ANC majority	ANC majority
Chris Hani									ANC majority	ANC majority
	Inxuba Yethemba	10	0	7	0	0	1	18	ANC majority	ANC majority
	Intsika Yethu	35	0	1	4	2	1	42	ANC majority	ANC majority
	Emalahleni	28	0	2	2	1	1	34	ANC majority	ANC majority
	Engcobo	32	1	1	2	2	1	39	ANC majority	ANC majority
	Sakhisizwe	13	1	2	1	0	0	17	ANC majority	ANC majority
	Enoch Mgijima	44	1	7	6	1	8	68	ANC majority	ANC majority
Joe Gqabi									ANC majority	ANC majority
	Elundini	28	1	1	2	1	1	34	ANC majority	ANC majority
	Senqu	25	0	1	4	1	3	34	ANC majority	ANC majority
	Walter Sisulu	12	0	5	3	0	2	22	ANC majority	ANC majority
OR Tambo									ANC majority	ANC majority
	Ngquza Hill	46	1	2	6	1	4	63	ANC majority	ANC majority
	Port St Johns	31	2	1	3	1	1	39	ANC majority	ANC majority
	Nyandeni	51	5	1	4	2	1	63	ANC majority	ANC majority
	Mhlontlo	40	2	1	3	3	2	51	ANC majority	ANC majority
	King Sabata Dalindyebo	48	3	1	5	11	5	72	ANC majority	ANC majority
Alfred Nzo									ANC majority	ANC majority
	Matatiele	40	1	3	7	1	2	51	ANC majority	ANC majority
	Umzimvubu	42	2	2	6	2	1	53	ANC majority	ANC majority
	Winnie Madikizela-Mandela	48	5	1	4	1	5	62	ANC majority	ANC majority
	Ntabankulu	31	1	1	4	0	1	38	ANC majority	ANC majority

==== Free State ====
In the following table, green cells indicate those municipalities won by the ANC with majorities, light green cells indicate municipalities won by the ANC with minorities or coalitions. Light blue cells indicate those won by the DA with a minority or coalition. Grey cells indicate those won by a minority party with a minority or coalition.

===== Metropolitan Municipalities =====
The ANC maintained overall control in Manguang.

Metropolitan Municipalities
Municipality	ANC	DA	EFF	FF+	Others	Total	Prior Control	New Control
Mangaung	51	26	12	5	7	101	ANC majority	ANC majority

===== Two Tier Municipalities =====
The ANC maintains overall control in one district municipality. The DA has a minority control in one district municipality. Two District municipalities are unknown. The ANC maintained overall control in 14 local municipalities, coalition in one, and minority in one. In one local municipality the DA has minority control. In one local municipality a minority party leads a coalition.

Two Tier Municipalities
District Municipality	Local Municipality	ANC	DA	EFF	FF+	Others	Total	Prior Control	New Control
Fezile Dabi								ANC majority	DA minority
	Moqhaka	22	10	5	3	4	44	ANC majority	ANC-PAU coalition
	Metsimaholo	16	12	12	3	3	46	ANC-SACP-F4SD-MCA coalition	DA minority
	Ngwathe	21	7	5	3	1	37	ANC majority	ANC majority
	Mafube	10	2	3	2	0	17	ANC majority	ANC majority
Lejweleputswa				6				ANC majority	ANC majority
	Matjhabeng	39	16	9	2	6	72	ANC majority	ANC majority
	Nala	12	2	6	2	2	24	ANC majority	ANC minority
	Masilonyana	11	4	2	1	1	19	ANC majority	ANC majority
	Tokologo	8	2	2	1	0	13	ANC majority	ANC majority
	Tswelopele	10	3	2	1	1	17	ANC majority	ANC majority
Thabo Mofutsanyana								ANC majority	ANC majority
	Maluti-a-Phofung	28	5	7	1	29	70	ANC majority	MAP16-EFF-DPSA-ATM-SARKO-AULA-AIC minority
	Dihlabeng	23	7	4	2	4	40	ANC majority	ANC majority
	Setsoto	17	2	3	2	9	33	ANC majority	ANC majority
	Nketoana	10	3	2	2	1	18	ANC majority	ANC majority
	Mantsopa	11	4	2	0	1	17	ANC majority	ANC majority
	Phumelela	11	2	2	1	0	16	ANC majority	ANC majority
Xhariep								ANC majority	ANC majority
	Kopanong	11	3	2	1	0	17	ANC majority	ANC majority
	Letsemeng	9	2	1	1	0	13	ANC majority	ANC majority
	Mohokare	8	1	2	1	1	13	ANC majority	ANC majority

==== Gauteng ====
In the following table, green cells indicate those municipalities won by the ANC with Majorities, light green cells indicate municipalities won by the ANC with Minorities or coalitions. blue cells indicate municipalities won by the DA with a majority, light blue cells indicate those won by the DA with a minority or coalition.

===== Metropolitan Municipalities =====
No parties were able to receive full control in any of the 3 metropolitan municipalities, the DA leads in all three. In two municipalities, Tshwane and Johannesburg, the DA governs with coalitions. In one municipality, Ekurhuleni, the DA governs with a minority.

Metropolitan Municipalities
Municipality	ActionSA	ANC	DA	EFF	FF+	IFP	PA	Others	Total	Prior Control	New Control
City of Johannesburg	44	91	71	29	4	7	8	16	270	ANC-COPE-AIC-UDM-Al Jama-ah coalition	DA-ActionSA-IFP-VF+-COPE-ACDP-PA-ATM-APC-UIM coalition
Ekurhuleni	15	86	65	31	8	3	4	12	224	ANC-AIC-PAC-PA coalition	DA-ActionSA-IFP-VF+-COPE-ACDP-PA minority
City of Tshwane	19	75	69	23	17	1	1	9	214	DA-ACDP-VF+ minority	DA-ActionSA-IFP-VF+-COPE-ACDP coalition

===== Two Tier Municipalities =====
The ANC has a minority control over on District Municipality, the other municipality led by the DA. The DA was able to maintain overall control over 1 local municipality, and gain control through a minority in another one. The ANC was able to maintain control in 4 local municipalities through minorities.

Two Tier Municipalities
District Municipality	Local Municipality	ANC	DA	EFF	FF+	Others	Total	Prior Control	New Control
Sedibeng							20	ANC majority	ANC minority
	Emfuleni	38	24	14	6	8	90	ANC majority	ANC minority
	Lesedi	13	5	4	3	1	26	ANC majority	ANC minority
	Midvaal	6	19	2	2	1	30	DA majority	DA majority
West Rand							44	ANC majority	DA minority
	Merafong City	27	9	9	4	6	55	ANC majority	ANC minority
	Mogale City	31	25	11	6	4	77	ANC-IFP coalition	DA-IFP-ACDP-ATM minority
	Rand West City	32	16	11	3	6	69	ANC majority	ANC minority

==== KwaZulu-Natal ====
In the following table, green rows indicate those won by the ANC with a majority, light green rows indicate those won by the ANC with a minority or coalition, red rows indicate those won by the Inkatha Freedom Party (IFP) with a majority, and pink rows indicate led by an IFP minority or coalition. Blue cells indicate municipalities won by the DA with a majority. Yellow rows indicate those won by the National Freedom Party (NFP).

===== Metropolitan Municipalities =====
ANC maintained control of eThekwini through a coalition government.

Metropolitan Municipalities
Municipality	ANC	DA	EFF	IFP	Others	Total	Prior Control	New Control
eThekwini	96	58	24	16	28	222	ANC majority	ANC-ABC coalition

===== Two Tier Municipalities =====
The ANC has control over 5 District Municipalities with majorities. The IFP has control over 1 District Municipality with a coalition and 4 District municipalities with minorities. The ANC was able to receive overall control in 13 Local Municipalities, has control over 1 municipality through a coalition and 4 municipalities through minorities. The IFP was able to receive overall control in 8 Local Municipalities, has control over 3 municipalities through coalition and 12 municipalities through minorities. The DA was able to receive overall control in 1 municipality.

Two Tier Municipalities
District Municipality	Local Municipality	ANC	DA	EFF	IFP	NFP	Others	Total	Prior Control	New Control
Amajuba									ANC majority	IFP-EFF-Team Sugar coalition
	Newcastle	22	5	8	18	1	13	67	ANC majority	IFP-ActionSA-DA coalition
	eMadlangeni	4	1	1	4	1	0	11	ANC majority	IFP-EFF-NFP coalition
	Dannhauser	9	1	3	8	0	3	25	ANC majority	IFP-EFF minority
Harry Gwala									ANC majority	ANC majority
	uMzimkhulu	33	1	6	1	0	5	43	ANC majority	ANC majority
	Dr Nkosazana Dlamini Zuma	16	3	6	4	0	0	29	ANC majority	ANC majority
	uBuhlebezwe	18	1	3	2	1	1	27	ANC majority	ANC majority
	Greater Kokstad	12	2	4	0	0	1	19	ANC majority	ANC majority
iLembe									ANC majority	ANC majority
	KwaDukuza	29	9	4	4	0	13	59	ANC majority	ANC-AIC-ATM coalition
	Mandeni	19	1	4	10	0	1	35	ANC majority	ANC majority
	Maphumulo	11	0	1	10	0	1	23	ANC majority	IFP minority
	Ndwedwe	19	1	4	11	0	2	37	ANC majority	ANC majority
Ugu		19						36	ANC majority	ANC majority
	Ray Nkonyeni	37	14	7	8	0	5	71	ANC majority	ANC majority
	uMzumbe	21	0	2	14	0	2	39	ANC majority	ANC majority
	uMdoni	17	7	5	5	0	3	37	ANC majority	ANC minority
	uMuziwabantu	10	1	1	5	0	3	20	ANC majority	ANC minority
uMgungundlovu									ANC majority	ANC majority
	uMngeni	10	13	2	0	0	0	25	ANC majority	DA majority
	Msunduzi	40	16	10	8	0	6	80	ANC majority	ANC minority
	Mkhambathini	9	1	2	2	0	0	14	ANC majority	ANC majority
	uMshwathi	16	2	3	4	0	2	27	ANC majority	ANC majority
	Richmond	9	1	2	1	0	1	14	ANC majority	ANC majority
	iMpendle	6	0	2	2	0	0	10	ANC majority	ANC majority
	Mpofana	7	1	1	1	0	0	10	ANC majority	ANC majority
uMkhanyakude		18	0	2	15	0	0	35	ANC majority	ANC majority
	Jozini	24	0	2	16	0	3	40	IFP minority	IFP majority
	Mtubatuba	16	1	4	19	1	3	44	IFP minority	IFP minority
	uMhlabuyalingana	18	1	2	15	1	2	39	ANC majority	IFP minority
	Big Five Hlabisa	9	0	1	15	1	0	25	IFP majority	IFP majority
uMzinyathi		11	1	0	0	15	2	29	IFP minority	IFP majority
	eNdumeni	5	2	0	5	0	1	13	IFP minority	IFP minority
	Nquthu	14	0	1	19	0	3	37	IFP minority	IFP majority
	Msinga	11	0	1	27	0	2	41	IFP majority	IFP majority
	uMvoti	10	1	0	9	0	7	27	ANC majority	IFP minority
uThukela									ANC majority	IFP minority
	Alfred Duma	28	3	5	33	1	3	72	ANC majority	IFP minority (in doubt)
	Okhahlamba	8	1	2	9	2	7	29	ANC majority	IFP-Apemo coalition
	iNkosi Langalibalele	17	3	2	21	3	0	46	ANC-Ind coalition	IFP minority
Zululand									IFP minority	IFP minority (in doubt)
	eDumbe	5	1	1	5	6	1	19	ANC minority	NFP-ANC coalition
	uPhongolo	10	1	1	15	2	0	29	ANC majority	IFP majority
	AbaQulusi	14	2	3	21	4	1	45	IFP minority	IFP minority
	Nongoma	8	0	2	21	13	1	45	IFP majority	IFP minority
	Ulundi	5	1	2	32	7	0	47	IFP majority	IFP majority
King Cetshwayo									ANC majority	IFP majority
	uMhlathuze	27	8	6	23	1	2	67	ANC majority	IFP-DA-EFF coalition
	uMfolozi	13	0	3	18	1	0	35	ANC majority	IFP majority
	uMlalazi	18	1	4	30	1	1	55	ANC majority	IFP majority
	Mthonjaneni	10	0	1	12	1	1	25	IFP majority	IFP minority
	Nkandla	10	0	1	16	0	0	27	IFP majority	IFP majority

==== Limpopo ====
In the following table, green cells indicate those municipalities won by the ANC with Majorities. Light blue cells indicate those won by the DA with a minority or coalition.

Two Tier Municipalities

The ANC was able to receive overall control in all 5 District Municipalities. The ANC was able to receive overall control in 20 Local Municipalities. In 2 Local Municipalities DA has minority control.

Two Tier Municipalities
District Municipality	Local Municipality	ANC	DA	EFF	Others	Total	Prior Control	New Control
Capricorn							ANC majority	ANC majority
	Blouberg	33	1	7	3	44	ANC majority	ANC majority
	Lepele-Nkumpi	40	2	12	6	60	ANC majority	ANC majority
	Polokwane	56	7	21	6	90	ANC majority	ANC majority
	Molemole	22	1	6	3	32	ANC majority	ANC majority
Mopani							ANC majority	ANC majority
	Ba-Phalaborwa	24	4	5	4	37	ANC majority	ANC majority
	Greater Giyani	47	1	5	7	62	ANC majority	ANC majority
	Greater Letaba	47	1	8	4	60	ANC majority	ANC majority
	Greater Tzaneen	51	5	9	4	69	ANC majority	ANC majority
	Maruleng	15	2	4	6	27	ANC majority	ANC majority
Sekhukhune							ANC majority	ANC majority
	Elias Motsoaledi	36	4	14	7	61	ANC majority	ANC majority
	Ephraim Mogale	19	2	7	4	32	ANC majority	ANC majority
	Fetakgomo Tubatse	54	2	14	7	77	ANC majority	ANC majority
	Makhuduthamaga	40	1	15	5	62	ANC majority	ANC majority
Vhembe							ANC majority	ANC majority
	Makhado	62	5	2	4	75	ANC majority	ANC majority
	Musina	19	2	2	1	24	ANC majority	ANC majority
	Thulamela	71	2	4	4	81	ANC majority	ANC majority
	Collins Chabane	55	1	7	8	71	ANC majority	ANC majority
Waterberg							ANC majority	ANC majority
	Bela-Bela	10	3	2	2	17	ANC majority	ANC majority
	Lephalale	19	3	3	4	29	ANC majority	ANC majority
	Mogalakwena	42	5	13	4	64	ANC majority	ANC majority
	Modimolle–Mookgophong	14	7	4	3	28	DA-VF+ minority	DA minority
	Thabazimbi	11	4	2	6	23	DA-VF+-TRA minority	DA minority

==== Mpumalanga ====
In the following table, green rows indicate those won by the ANC. Light green rows indicate those led by a Minority ANC government. Gray rows indicate those led by Minor Party with a coalition or minority.

Two Tier Municipalities

The ANC won overall control in all 3 District Municipalities. In 13 Local Municipalities ANC has total control, in 2 Local Municipalities ANC has minority control. In 2 Local Municipalities minor parties or Independents have control.

Two Tier Municipalities
District Municipality	Local Municipality	ANC	DA	EFF	FF+	Others	Total	Prior Control	New Control
Ehlanzeni								ANC majority	ANC majority
	Thaba Chweu	16	6	3	1	1	27	ANC majority	ANC majority
	Nkomazi	50	4	9	1	1	65	ANC majority	ANC majority
	Bushbuckridge	53	2	8	0	13	76	ANC majority	ANC majority
	Mbombela	59	12	14	3	2	90	ANC majority	ANC majority
Gert Sibande		28	8	10	2	0	48	ANC majority	ANC majority
	Albert Luthuli	38	1	8	0	0	49	ANC majority	ANC majority
	Msukaligwa	24	4	7	2	2	38	ANC majority	ANC majority
	Mkhondo	21	4	7	1	5	38	ANC majority	Independent-EFF-ATM minority
	Pixley ka Seme	13	2	3	0	3	21	ANC majority	ANC majority
	Lekwa	13	4	3	3	7	30	ANC majority	LCM-EFF minority
	Dipaleseng	8	1	2	1	0	12	ANC majority	ANC majority
	Govan Mbeki	26	17	13	3	4	63	ANC majority	ANC minority
Nkangala								ANC majority	ANC majority
	Victor Khanye	9	3	1	1	3	17	ANC majority	ANC majority
	Emalahleni	35	13	14	4	2	68	ANC majority	ANC majority
	Steve Tshwete	21	17	9	3	8	58	ANC majority	ANC minority
	Emakhazeni	10	2	3	0	0	15	ANC majority	ANC majority
	Thembisile Hani	40	4	12	0	8	64	ANC majority	ANC majority
	Dr JS Moroka	39	3	10	0	9	62	ANC majority	ANC majority

==== Northern Cape ====
In the following table, green rows indicate those won by the ANC majority, and light green cells indicate municipalities led by an ANC coalition or minority. Light blue rows indicate municipalities won led by a DA coalition or minority. Light red rows indicate municipalities won led by an EFF coalition or minority. Light grey rows indicate municipalities won led by a Minor Party coalition or minority.

Two Tier Municipalities

The ANC has overall control in 4 District Municipality and governs in 1 District Municipality with a coalition. The ANC won overall control of 16 Local Municipalities, in 2 Local Municipalities ANC governs with a coalition, in 2 Local Municipalities ANC governs with a minority. The EFF governs in one local municipality, which has been put into doubt. In 3 local municipalities are governed by minor parties.

Two Tier Municipalities
District Municipality	Local Municipality	ANC	DA	EFF	Others	Total	Prior Control	New Control
Frances Baard		15	4	5	5	29	ANC majority	ANC majority
	Sol Plaatje	33	14	6	12	65	ANC majority	ANC majority
	Dikgatlong	8	1	3	3	15	ANC majority	ANC majority
	Magareng	6	2	2	1	11	ANC majority	ANC majority
	Phokwane	10	2	4	3	19	ANC majority	ANC majority
John Taolo Gaetsewe							ANC majority	ANC majority
	Joe Morolong	18	1	8	2	29	ANC majority	ANC majority
	Ga-Segonyana	17	3	7	2	29	ANC majority	ANC majority
	Gamagara	7	5	1	2	15	ANC majority	ANC minority
Namakwa		11	4	3	1	19	ANC majority	ANC majority
	Richtersveld	6	3	1	1	11	ANC majority	ANC majority
	Nama Khoi	7	5	0	5	17	ANC-KSR coalition	NCM-DA coalition
	Kamiesberg	6	3	0	2	11	ANC majority	ANC majority
	Hantam	6	4	0	3	13	ANC majority	ANC majority
	Karoo Hoogland	5	3	0	3	11	ANC majority	ANC-PA coalition
	Khâi-Ma	6	1	1	3	11	ANC majority	ANC majority
Pixley ka Seme							ANC majority	ANC majority
	Ubuntu	7	3	0	1	11	ANC-IND coalition	ANC majority
	Umsobomvu	7	2	0	4	13	ANC majority	ANC majority
	Emthanjeni	9	4	1	1	15	ANC majority	ANC majority
	Kareeberg	5	2	2	2	11	ANC majority	KCM Minority
	Renosterberg	5	3	1	0	9	ANC majority	ANC majority
	Thembelihle	5	1	3	2	11	ANC majority	EFF minority (in doubt)
	Siyathemba	5	2	0	4	11	ANC majority	SCM minority
	Siyancuma	6	3	1	3	13	ANC majority	
ZF Mgcawu		11	7	1	4	23	ANC majority	ANC-Khoisan Revolution coalition
	Kai !Garib	10	3	1	5	19	ANC majority	ANC majority
	!Kheis	5	2	1	3	11	ANC majority	DA minority
	Tsantsabane	7	2	2	2	13	ANC majority	ANC majority
	Kgatelopele	5	2	1	3	11	ANC-KCF coalition	ANC-PA coalition
	Dawid Kruiper	18	12	1	2	33	ANC majority	ANC majority

==== North West ====
In the following table, green rows indicate those won by the ANC, and light green rows indicate those with an ANC minority or coalition. Light red cells indicate those won by EFF with a minority or coalition.

The municipal boundaries are determined by the Organised Local Government Act, 1997 (Act 52 of 1997).

Two Tier Municipalities

The ANC won overall control in 3 District Municipalities, and the EFF governs one District Municipality with a minority. The ANC won overall control in 15 Local Municipalities. The ANC governs with a minority in 3 Local Municipalities and with a coalition in 1 Local Municipality.

Two Tier Municipalities
District Municipality	Local Municipality	ANC	DA	EFF	FF+	F4SD	Others	Total	Prior Control	New Control
Bojanala									ANC majority	ANC majority
	Kgetlengrivier	7	1	2	2	0	1	13	ANC majority	ANC majority
	Madibeng	44	12	14	4	1	7	81	ANC majority	ANC majority
	Moretele	34	2	9	0	2	5	52	ANC majority	ANC majority
	Moses Kotane	46	2	13	0	1	7	69	ANC majority	ANC majority
	Rustenburg	43	13	17	3	1	11	89	ANC-AIC-BCM coalition	ANC-AIC-Arona-Ind coalition
Dr Kenneth Kaunda									ANC majority	ANC majority
	Matlosana	40	16	9	7	2	3	77	ANC majority	ANC majority
	JB Marks	33	17	6	9	0	2	67	ANC majority	ANC minority
	Maquassi Hills	13	2	4	1	1	1	22	ANC majority	ANC majority
Dr Ruth Segomotsi Mompati		16	1	10	0	0	3	30	ANC majority	EFF minority
	Kagisano-Molopo	20	2	4	0	0	3	29	ANC majority	ANC majority
	Greater Taung	28	1	11	0	2	6	48	ANC majority	ANC majority
	Lekwa-Teemane	7	1	4	1	1	0	14	ANC majority	ANC minority
	Mamusa	9	1	4	1	0	1	16	ANC majority	ANC minority (in doubt)
	Naledi	10	3	3	1	0	1	18	ANC majority	ANC majority
Ngaka Modiri Molema									ANC majority	ANC majority
	Ditsobotla	21	6	6	2	2	3	40	ANC majority	ANC majority
	Ramotshere Moiloa	23	1	6	1	5	1	38	ANC majority	ANC majority
	Ratlou	19	1	3	0	3	1	27	ANC majority	ANC majority
	Tswaing	19	4	4	1	0	1	29	ANC majority	ANC majority
	Mafikeng	40	5	17	1	2	5	69	ANC majority	ANC majority

==== Western Cape ====
In the following table, green cells indicate those municipalities won by the ANC with Majorities, light green cells indicate municipalities won by the ANC with Minorities or coalitions. blue cells indicate municipalities won by the DA with a majority, light blue cells indicate those won by the DA with a minority or coalition. light grey cells indicate those won by the Minor Party with a minority or coalition.

===== Metropolitan Municipalities =====
The DA maintained overall control of the City of Cape Town.

Metropolitan Municipalities
Municipality	ACDP	ANC	CCC	DA	EFF	GOOD	Others	Total	Prior Control	New Control
City of Cape Town	6	43	7	136	10	9	20	231	DA majority	DA majority

===== Two Tier Municipalities =====
The DA was able to maintain overall control of 3 District municipalities and governs another with a coalition. The ANC governs one District Municipality with a coalition.

The DA was able to maintain overall control of 8 Local municipalities, the DA governs 7 Local Municipalities with coalitions and 2 Local Municipalities with minorities. The ANC governs 3 Local Municipalities with coalitions and 1 Local Municipalities with minorities. The ANC lost more power in the province than previously in 2016. One Local Municipality is governed by a minor party.

Two Tier Municipalities
District Municipality	Local Municipality	ANC	DA	EFF	FF+	Good	PA	Others	Total	Prior Control	New Control
Cape Winelands		9	23	1	2	2	1	1	39	DA majority	DA majority
	Breede Valley	10	19	2	2	2	1	5	41	DA majority	DA-VF+-ACDP coalition
	Drakenstein	13	36	1	3	4	1	7	65	DA majority	DA majority
	Langeberg	6	10	1	3	1	1	2	23	DA majority	DA-VF+ coalition
	Stellenbosch	8	28	2	1	3	1	2	43	DA majority	DA majority
	Witzenberg	7	8	1	1	2	1	3	23	DA-COPE coalition	DA-VF+-GOOD-WP coalition
Central Karoo		4	4	0	0	1	2	2	13	ANC-KGP-KDF coalition	ANC-PA-KDF coalition
	Beaufort West	4	4	0	0	1	3	1	13	ANC-KDF coalition	ANC-KDF-PA coalition
	Laingsburg	2	3	0	0	0	1	1	7	ANC-KOP coalition	ANC-KDF-PA coalition
	Prince Albert	1	3	0	0	0	1	2	7	KGP-ANC coalition	ANC minority
Garden Route		11	16	2	2	2	2	0	35	DA majority	DA-VF+ coalition
	Bitou	4	5	0	0	0	1	3	13	ANC-AUF coalition	DA-AUF-PDC coalition
	George	10	26	2	4	6	1	6	55	DA majority	DA-VF+-ACDP coalition
	Hessequa	6	9	0	1	0	1	0	17	DA-VF+ coalition	DA majority
	Kannaland	2	1	0	0	0	0	4	7	ICOSA-ANC coalition	ANC-KIP minority
	Knysna	7	8	1	0	0	2	3	21	ANC-COPE coalition	DA-KIM minority
	Mossel Bay	5	19	0	2	0	1	2	29	DA majority	DA majority
	Oudtshoorn	8	7	0	3	1	1	5	25	DA majority	ANC-OGI-ICOSA minority
Overberg		8	12	0	2	1	0	0	23	DA majority	DA majority
	Cape Agulhas	3	5	0	1	0	0	2	11	DA majority	DA-VF+ coalition
	Overstrand	4	17	1	2	0	0	3	27	DA majority	DA majority
	Swellendam	4	6	0	1	0	0	0	11	DA majority	DA majority
	Theewaterskloof	9	11	1	1	3	2	1	27	DA majority	ANC-PA-Good coalition
West Coast		7	14	0	1	2	1	0	25	DA majority	DA majority
	Bergrivier	3	8	0	0	1	1	0	13	DA majority	DA majority
	Cederberg	4	2	0	1	0	1	3	11	ANC majority	CFR-DA-VF+ coalition
	Matzikama	4	6	1	1	1	2	0	15	ANC-UD coalition	DA-VF+ minority
	Saldanha Bay	6	13	1	1	4	1	1	27	DA majority	DA-VF+ coalition
	Swartland	5	14	1	2	1	0	0	23	DA majority	DA majority

== Aftermath ==
=== Post-election coalition governments ===
As of 7 November there were still 70 hung councils. Following meetings with other political parties on 6 November, the ANC announced that treasurer-general Paul Mashatile and deputy secretary-general Jessie Duarte would lead coalition negotiations with other political parties. During a public address in Soweto on 8 November, President Ramaphosa announced that the ANC would not enter coalitions unconditionally.

On 7 November, the DA announced that it would not enter coalitions with the ANC or EFF, but may partner with ActionSA and Freedom Front Plus.

The GOOD party announced that it will not enter coalitions, rather serving as "constructive opposition".

As of 9 November, ActionSA were negotiating a possible coalition with the DA in Tshwane. It had also received written demands from the EFF, which they refused.

On 13 November, Malema proposed that coalitions should be avoided in the major metropolitan municipalities in Gauteng. He suggested that the EFF should run Tshwane, leaving the ANC to govern Ekurhuleni and ActionSA to govern Johannesburg.

On 15 November, the Patriotic Alliance announced a coalition agreement with the ANC. The PA will have their own mayors, deputy mayors and several mayoral committee members.

On 16 November, EFF Leader Julius Malema announced that the party had terminated coalition discussions with the ANC.

On 17 November, IFP leader Velenkosini Hlabisa announced that it had entered into a coalition agreement with the ANC in the 21 hung councils in KwaZulu-Natal, despite previously saying a week earlier that the party would not form coalitions with the ANC.

== Controversies ==
Amnesty International has called on the Electoral Commission of South Africa to investigate reports of manhandling and the arrest of Newzroom Afrika journalist Ziniko Mhlaba. Ziniko Mhlaba was arrested by police at a Soweto polling station after he allegedly obstructed justice by distracting the presiding officer.

DA federal council chairwoman Helen Zille was purportedly dragged out of a Port Elizabeth polling station by police after being asked to leave the premises. She has since opened a case of assault at the Bethelsdorp police station and an Independent Police Investigative Directorate (IPID) investigator has been assigned the case.

In the Eastern Cape province it was reported that 22 polling stations couldn't open because protestors dug trenches and barricaded roads. At one polling station a voter management device (VMD) and a map were stolen. The IEC considered chartering a helicopter to lower in officials and material and commence voting. Around noon the polling stations opened after police and municipal officials dispersed the protesters.

In the 2021 elections the Cape Independence Party obtained 17,881 votes overall and obtained 1 seat in the City of Cape town. The party received reports from voters that they had voted at certain voting stations but that the results for those stations were showing 0 votes for the Cape Independence Party signed affidavits were obtained from voters and submitted to the IEC. The IEC refused a recount, so the Cape Independence Party appealed to the Electoral court and won. After the recount the parties votes totalled 19,180; with the party awarded a second seat in the city and the Democratic Alliance losing a seat that they had been previously awarded.
