= Nketoana Local Municipality elections =

Local elections in the Free State, South Africa

The Nketoana Local Municipality council consists of eighteen members elected by mixed-member proportional representation. Nine councillors are elected by first-past-the-post voting in nine wards, while the remaining nine are chosen from party lists so that the total number of party representatives is proportional to the number of votes received.

In the election of 3 August 2016 the African National Congress (ANC) won a majority of thirteen seats on the council.

In the 2021 South African municipal elections the African National Congress (ANC) won a reduced majority of ten seats on the council.

In the 2026 South African municipal elections the ANC lost its majority, but remains the largest party with nine seats.

== Results ==
The following table shows the composition of the council after past elections.

Event	ANC	DA	EFF	FF+	PAC	Other	Total
2000 election	12	3	—	—	2	0	17
2006 election	14	2	—	1	1	0	18
2011 election	14	2	—	1	0	1	18
2016 election	13	3	1	1	—	0	18
2021 election	10	3	2	2	0	1	18
2026 election	9	4	1	1	0	3	18

== December 2000 election ==
The following table shows the results of the 2000 election.

Party	Ward			List			Total seats
Party	Votes	%	Seats	Votes	%	Seats	Total seats
African National Congress	8,684	68.57	8	8,594	67.62	4	12
Democratic Alliance	1,968	15.54	1	2,170	17.07	2	3
Pan Africanist Congress of Azania	1,911	15.09	0	1,946	15.31	2	2
Independent candidates	101	0.80	0				0
Total	12,664	100.00	9	12,710	100.00	8	17
Valid votes	12,664	97.09		12,710	97.43		
Invalid/blank votes	380	2.91		335	2.57		
Total votes	13,044	100.00		13,045	100.00		
Registered voters/turnout	27,180	47.99		27,180	47.99		

== March 2006 election ==
The following table shows the results of the 2006 election.

Party	Ward			List			Total seats
Party	Votes	%	Seats	Votes	%	Seats	Total seats
African National Congress	11,109	77.66	9	11,392	79.47	5	14
Democratic Alliance	1,551	10.84	0	1,513	10.55	2	2
Pan Africanist Congress of Azania	900	6.29	0	826	5.76	1	1
Freedom Front Plus	493	3.45	0	604	4.21	1	1
Independent candidates	252	1.76	0				0
Total	14,305	100.00	9	14,335	100.00	9	18
Valid votes	14,305	97.63		14,335	97.76		
Invalid/blank votes	347	2.37		328	2.24		
Total votes	14,652	100.00		14,663	100.00		
Registered voters/turnout	29,154	50.26		29,154	50.29		

== May 2011 election ==
The following table shows the results of the 2011 election.

Party	Ward			List			Total seats
Party	Votes	%	Seats	Votes	%	Seats	Total seats
African National Congress	11,844	77.09	8	12,318	79.67	6	14
Democratic Alliance	2,035	13.25	1	2,024	13.09	1	2
Freedom Front Plus	510	3.32	0	419	2.71	1	1
African People's Convention	374	2.43	0	314	2.03	1	1
Congress of the People	144	0.94	0	266	1.72	0	0
Pan Africanist Congress of Azania	170	1.11	0	120	0.78	0	0
Independent candidates	287	1.87	0				0
Total	15,364	100.00	9	15,461	100.00	9	18
Valid votes	15,364	97.79		15,461	98.25		
Invalid/blank votes	348	2.21		275	1.75		
Total votes	15,712	100.00		15,736	100.00		
Registered voters/turnout	28,978	54.22		28,978	54.30		

== August 2016 election ==
The following table shows the results of the 2016 election.

Party	Ward			List			Total seats
Party	Votes	%	Seats	Votes	%	Seats	Total seats
African National Congress	10,869	67.70	8	11,750	72.80	5	13
Democratic Alliance	2,248	14.00	1	2,342	14.51	2	3
Economic Freedom Fighters	918	5.72	0	1,093	6.77	1	1
Freedom Front Plus	570	3.55	0	587	3.64	1	1
Independent candidates	1,119	6.97	0				0
African People's Convention	272	1.69	0	368	2.28	0	0
United Residents Front	59	0.37	0				0
Total	16,055	100.00	9	16,140	100.00	9	18
Valid votes	16,055	97.75		16,140	97.66		
Invalid/blank votes	369	2.25		386	2.34		
Total votes	16,424	100.00		16,526	100.00		
Registered voters/turnout	30,559	53.75		30,559	54.08		

== November 2021 election ==
The following table shows the results of the 2021 election.

Party	Ward			List			Total seats
Party	Votes	%	Seats	Votes	%	Seats	Total seats
African National Congress	6,469	49.26	8	7,148	54.72	2	10
Democratic Alliance	1,613	12.28	1	1,695	12.98	2	3
Economic Freedom Fighters	1,501	11.43	0	1,698	13.00	2	2
Freedom Front Plus	1,039	7.91	0	1,029	7.88	2	2
Independent candidates	1,887	14.37	0				0
All Unemployment Labour Alliance				676	5.18	1	1
African Transformation Movement	217	1.65	0	249	1.91	0	0
Forum for Service Delivery	222	1.69	0	234	1.79	0	0
Pan Africanist Congress of Azania	98	0.75	0	109	0.83	0	0
Agency for New Agenda	31	0.24	0	135	1.03	0	0
African People's Convention	56	0.43	0	89	0.68	0	0
Total	13,133	100.00	9	13,062	100.00	9	18
Valid votes	13,133	98.01		13,062	97.49		
Invalid/blank votes	267	1.99		336	2.51		
Total votes	13,400	100.00		13,398	100.00		
Registered voters/turnout	28,691	46.70		28,691	46.70		

== November 2026 election ==
The following table shows the results of the 2026 election.

Party	Ward			List			Total seats
Party	Votes	%	Seats	Votes	%	Seats	Total seats
African National Congress	8,190	49.40	9	8,013	48.77	0	9
Democratic Alliance	3,487	21.03	0	3,462	21.07	4	4
African Content Movement	1,784	10.76	0	1,860	11.32	2	2
Freedom Front Plus	1,148	6.92	0	1,155	7.03	1	1
Economic Freedom Fighters	859	5.18	0	859	5.23	1	1
African Congress for Transformation	341	2.06	0	359	2.19	1	1
African Transformation Movement	143	0.86	0	149	0.91	0	0
Nketoane Community Movement	132	0.80	0	137	0.83	0	0
South African Communist Party	142	0.86	0	127	0.77	0	0
African Movement Congress	87	0.52	0	85	0.52	0	0
Batho Movement	52	0.31	0	50	0.30	0	0
uMkhonto weSizwe Party	91	0.55	0				0
Afrika Mayibuye Movement	38	0.23	0	50	0.30	0	0
Congress of the People	33	0.20	0	48	0.29	0	0
Patriotic Alliance	36	0.22	0	42	0.26	0	0
Pan Africanist Congress of Azania	17	0.10	0	34	0.21	0	0
Total	16,580	100.00	9	16,430	100.00	9	18
Valid votes	16,580	97.63		16,430	97.95		
Invalid/blank votes	402	2.37		344	2.05		
Total votes	16,982	100.00		16,774	100.00		
Registered voters/turnout	32,883	51.64		32,883	51.01		
