= Letsemeng Local Municipality elections =

Local elections in the Free State, South Africa

The Letsemeng Local Municipality council consists of thirteen members elected by mixed-member proportional representation. Seven councillors are elected by first-past-the-post voting in seven wards, while the remaining six are chosen from party lists so that the total number of party representatives is proportional to the number of votes received.

In the election of 4 November 2026 the African National Congress (ANC) won a majority of eight seats on the council.

== Results ==
The following table shows the composition of the council after past elections.

| Event | ANC | DA | EFF | FF+ | Other | Total |
|---|---|---|---|---|---|---|
| 2000 election | 8 | 2 | — | — | 0 | 10 |
| 2006 election | 8 | 1 | — | — | 1 | 10 |
| 2011 election | 8 | 2 | — | 0 | 1 | 11 |
| 2016 election | 8 | 2 | 1 | 0 | 0 | 11 |
| 2021 election | 9 | 2 | 1 | 1 | 0 | 13 |
| 2026 election | 8 | 3 | 1 | 1 | 0 | 13 |

== December 2000 election ==
The following table shows the results of the 2000 election.

| Party | Ward | | | List | | | Total seats |
| Party | Votes | % | Seats | Votes | % | Seats | Total seats |
|---|---|---|---|---|---|---|---|
| African National Congress | 6,256 | 76.21 | 5 | 6,287 | 76.42 | 3 | 8 |
| Democratic Alliance | 1,494 | 18.20 | 0 | 1,588 | 19.30 | 2 | 2 |
| Alliance 2000+ | 459 | 5.59 | 0 | 352 | 4.28 | 0 | 0 |
| Total | 8,209 | 100.00 | 5 | 8,227 | 100.00 | 5 | 10 |
| Valid votes | 8,209 | 97.30 | | 8,227 | 97.64 | | |
| Invalid/blank votes | 228 | 2.70 | | 199 | 2.36 | | |
| Total votes | 8,437 | 100.00 | | 8,426 | 100.00 | | |
| Registered voters/turnout | 15,037 | 56.11 | | 15,037 | 56.04 | | |

== March 2006 election ==
The following table shows the results of the 2006 election.

| Party | Ward | | | List | | | Total seats |
| Party | Votes | % | Seats | Votes | % | Seats | Total seats |
|---|---|---|---|---|---|---|---|
| African National Congress | 5,597 | 70.81 | 5 | 5,803 | 77.77 | 3 | 8 |
| Democratic Alliance | 965 | 12.21 | 0 | 941 | 12.61 | 1 | 1 |
| Independent candidates | 735 | 9.30 | 0 | | | | 0 |
| African Christian Democratic Party | 260 | 3.29 | 0 | 278 | 3.73 | 1 | 1 |
| Freedom Front Plus | 152 | 1.92 | 0 | 299 | 4.01 | 0 | 0 |
| Pan Africanist Congress of Azania | 195 | 2.47 | 0 | 141 | 1.89 | 0 | 0 |
| Total | 7,904 | 100.00 | 5 | 7,462 | 100.00 | 5 | 10 |
| Valid votes | 7,904 | 97.38 | | 7,462 | 92.11 | | |
| Invalid/blank votes | 213 | 2.62 | | 639 | 7.89 | | |
| Total votes | 8,117 | 100.00 | | 8,101 | 100.00 | | |
| Registered voters/turnout | 16,521 | 49.13 | | 16,521 | 49.03 | | |

== May 2011 election ==
The following table shows the results of the 2011 election.

| Party | Ward | | | List | | | Total seats |
| Party | Votes | % | Seats | Votes | % | Seats | Total seats |
|---|---|---|---|---|---|---|---|
| African National Congress | 8,282 | 75.72 | 6 | 8,473 | 77.14 | 2 | 8 |
| Democratic Alliance | 1,567 | 14.33 | 0 | 1,572 | 14.31 | 2 | 2 |
| Congress of the People | 622 | 5.69 | 0 | 610 | 5.55 | 1 | 1 |
| Freedom Front Plus | 305 | 2.79 | 0 | 203 | 1.85 | 0 | 0 |
| African Christian Democratic Party | 126 | 1.15 | 0 | 126 | 1.15 | 0 | 0 |
| Independent candidates | 35 | 0.32 | 0 | | | | 0 |
| Total | 10,937 | 100.00 | 6 | 10,984 | 100.00 | 5 | 11 |
| Valid votes | 10,937 | 98.19 | | 10,984 | 98.72 | | |
| Invalid/blank votes | 202 | 1.81 | | 142 | 1.28 | | |
| Total votes | 11,139 | 100.00 | | 11,126 | 100.00 | | |
| Registered voters/turnout | 18,043 | 61.74 | | 18,043 | 61.66 | | |

== August 2016 election ==
The following table shows the results of the 2016 election.

| Party | Ward | | | List | | | Total seats |
| Party | Votes | % | Seats | Votes | % | Seats | Total seats |
|---|---|---|---|---|---|---|---|
| African National Congress | 7,813 | 68.92 | 6 | 7,761 | 68.11 | 2 | 8 |
| Democratic Alliance | 1,337 | 11.79 | 0 | 1,635 | 14.35 | 2 | 2 |
| Economic Freedom Fighters | 1,257 | 11.09 | 0 | 1,283 | 11.26 | 1 | 1 |
| Congress of the People | 438 | 3.86 | 0 | 343 | 3.01 | 0 | 0 |
| Freedom Front Plus | 430 | 3.79 | 0 | 321 | 2.82 | 0 | 0 |
| African Christian Democratic Party | 62 | 0.55 | 0 | 52 | 0.46 | 0 | 0 |
| Total | 11,337 | 100.00 | 6 | 11,395 | 100.00 | 5 | 11 |
| Valid votes | 11,337 | 98.27 | | 11,395 | 98.35 | | |
| Invalid/blank votes | 200 | 1.73 | | 191 | 1.65 | | |
| Total votes | 11,537 | 100.00 | | 11,586 | 100.00 | | |
| Registered voters/turnout | 19,458 | 59.29 | | 19,458 | 59.54 | | |

== November 2021 election ==
The following table shows the results of the 2021 election.

| Party | Ward | | | List | | | Total seats |
| Party | Votes | % | Seats | Votes | % | Seats | Total seats |
|---|---|---|---|---|---|---|---|
| African National Congress | 6,188 | 64.02 | 7 | 6,220 | 65.04 | 2 | 9 |
| Democratic Alliance | 1,531 | 15.84 | 0 | 1,562 | 16.33 | 2 | 2 |
| Economic Freedom Fighters | 1,009 | 10.44 | 0 | 1,064 | 11.13 | 1 | 1 |
| Freedom Front Plus | 484 | 5.01 | 0 | 494 | 5.17 | 1 | 1 |
| African Christian Democratic Party | 153 | 1.58 | 0 | 174 | 1.82 | 0 | 0 |
| Independent candidates | 286 | 2.96 | 0 | | | | 0 |
| African Transformation Movement | 14 | 0.14 | 0 | 49 | 0.51 | 0 | 0 |
| Total | 9,665 | 100.00 | 7 | 9,563 | 100.00 | 6 | 13 |
| Valid votes | 9,665 | 97.69 | | 9,563 | 96.72 | | |
| Invalid/blank votes | 229 | 2.31 | | 324 | 3.28 | | |
| Total votes | 9,894 | 100.00 | | 9,887 | 100.00 | | |
| Registered voters/turnout | 19,472 | 50.81 | | 19,472 | 50.78 | | |

== November 2026 election ==
The following table shows the results of the 2026 election.

| Party | Ward | | | List | | | Total seats |
| Party | Votes | % | Seats | Votes | % | Seats | Total seats |
|---|---|---|---|---|---|---|---|
| African National Congress | 6,920 | 60.53 | 7 | 6,950 | 60.77 | 1 | 8 |
| Democratic Alliance | 2,372 | 20.75 | 0 | 2,471 | 21.61 | 3 | 3 |
| Freedom Front Plus | 896 | 7.84 | 0 | 882 | 7.71 | 1 | 1 |
| Economic Freedom Fighters | 796 | 6.96 | 0 | 830 | 7.26 | 1 | 1 |
| South African Communist Party | 182 | 1.59 | 0 | 173 | 1.51 | 0 | 0 |
| Independent candidates | 135 | 1.18 | 0 | | | | 0 |
| African Christian Democratic Party | 63 | 0.55 | 0 | 70 | 0.61 | 0 | 0 |
| African Transformation Movement | 10 | 0.09 | 0 | 41 | 0.36 | 0 | 0 |
| Afrika Mayibuye Movement | 20 | 0.17 | 0 | 20 | 0.17 | 0 | 0 |
| uMkhonto weSizwe Party | 38 | 0.33 | 0 | | | | 0 |
| Total | 11,432 | 100.00 | 7 | 11,437 | 100.00 | 6 | 13 |
| Valid votes | 11,432 | 98.47 | | 11,437 | 98.07 | | |
| Invalid/blank votes | 178 | 1.53 | | 225 | 1.93 | | |
| Total votes | 11,610 | 100.00 | | 11,662 | 100.00 | | |
| Registered voters/turnout | 21,246 | 54.65 | | 21,246 | 54.89 | | |
