= Mafube Local Municipality elections =

Local elections in the Free State, South Africa

The Mafube Local Municipality council consists of seventeen members elected by mixed-member proportional representation. Nine councillors are elected by first-past-the-post voting in nine wards, while the remaining eight are chosen from party lists so that the total number of party representatives is proportional to the number of votes received.

In the election of 3 August 2016 the African National Congress (ANC) won a majority of thirteen seats on the council.

In the election of 1 November 2021, the ANC won a reduced majority of ten seats.

In the election of 4 November 2026, the ANC lost its majority, but remains the largest party, with seven seats on the council.

== Results ==
The following table shows the composition of the council after past elections.

Event	ANC	DA	EFF	FF+	Other	Total
2000 election	12	3	—	—	0	15
2006 election	13	1	—	1	2	17
2011 election	12	3	—	0	2	17
2016 election	13	2	1	1	0	17
2021 election	10	2	3	2	0	17
2026 election	7	3	1	2	4	17

== December 2000 election ==
The following table shows the results of the 2000 election.

Party	Ward			List			Total seats
Party	Votes	%	Seats	Votes	%	Seats	Total seats
African National Congress	9,059	77.70	7	10,597	81.65	5	12
Democratic Alliance	2,211	18.96	1	2,381	18.35	2	3
Independent candidates	389	3.34	0				0
Total	11,659	100.00	8	12,978	100.00	7	15
Valid votes	11,659	97.84		12,978	98.01		
Invalid/blank votes	257	2.16		264	1.99		
Total votes	11,916	100.00		13,242	100.00		
Registered voters/turnout	24,348	48.94		24,348	54.39		

== March 2006 election ==
The following table shows the results of the 2006 election.

Party	Ward			List			Total seats
Party	Votes	%	Seats	Votes	%	Seats	Total seats
African National Congress	10,328	75.08	9	10,296	75.03	4	13
Democratic Alliance	1,067	7.76	0	1,014	7.39	1	1
Pan Africanist Congress of Azania	943	6.86	0	997	7.27	1	1
Freedom Front Plus	685	4.98	0	755	5.50	1	1
Azanian People's Organisation	711	5.17	0	661	4.82	1	1
Independent candidates	22	0.16	0				0
Total	13,756	100.00	9	13,723	100.00	8	17
Valid votes	13,756	98.00		13,723	97.82		
Invalid/blank votes	281	2.00		306	2.18		
Total votes	14,037	100.00		14,029	100.00		
Registered voters/turnout	26,965	52.06		26,965	52.03		

== May 2011 election ==
The following table shows the results of the 2011 election.

Party	Ward			List			Total seats
Party	Votes	%	Seats	Votes	%	Seats	Total seats
African National Congress	11,995	71.51	8	12,294	73.18	4	12
Democratic Alliance	2,582	15.39	1	2,439	14.52	2	3
Congress of the People	1,647	9.82	0	1,589	9.46	2	2
Freedom Front Plus	305	1.82	0	317	1.89	0	0
Pan Africanist Congress of Azania	176	1.05	0	93	0.55	0	0
African Christian Democratic Party	68	0.41	0	68	0.40	0	0
Total	16,773	100.00	9	16,800	100.00	8	17
Valid votes	16,773	98.35		16,800	98.47		
Invalid/blank votes	281	1.65		261	1.53		
Total votes	17,054	100.00		17,061	100.00		
Registered voters/turnout	28,798	59.22		28,798	59.24		

== August 2016 election ==
The following table shows the results of the 2016 election.

Party	Ward			List			Total seats
Party	Votes	%	Seats	Votes	%	Seats	Total seats
African National Congress	12,191	76.04	8	12,187	75.27	5	13
Democratic Alliance	2,161	13.48	1	2,172	13.41	1	2
Economic Freedom Fighters	1,061	6.62	0	1,071	6.61	1	1
Freedom Front Plus	451	2.81	0	462	2.85	1	1
Congress of the People	169	1.05	0	299	1.85	0	0
Total	16,033	100.00	9	16,191	100.00	8	17
Valid votes	16,033	97.89		16,191	98.03		
Invalid/blank votes	345	2.11		325	1.97		
Total votes	16,378	100.00		16,516	100.00		
Registered voters/turnout	30,882	53.03		30,882	53.48		

== November 2021 election ==
The following table shows the results of the 2021 election.

Party	Ward			List			Total seats
Party	Votes	%	Seats	Votes	%	Seats	Total seats
African National Congress	7,315	55.69	9	7,590	58.28	1	10
Economic Freedom Fighters	1,708	13.00	0	2,036	15.63	3	3
Freedom Front Plus	1,216	9.26	0	1,242	9.54	2	2
Democratic Alliance	1,026	7.81	0	1,195	9.18	2	2
Independent candidates	1,446	11.01	0				0
Forum for Service Delivery	121	0.92	0	517	3.97	0	0
African Transformation Movement	193	1.47	0	259	1.99	0	0
Inkatha Freedom Party	110	0.84	0	184	1.41	0	0
Total	13,135	100.00	9	13,023	100.00	8	17
Valid votes	13,135	98.40		13,023	98.25		
Invalid/blank votes	213	1.60		232	1.75		
Total votes	13,348	100.00		13,255	100.00		
Registered voters/turnout	29,510	45.23		29,510	44.92		

== November 2026 election ==
The following table shows the results of the 2026 election.

Party	Ward			List			Total seats
Party	Votes	%	Seats	Votes	%	Seats	Total seats
African National Congress	6,361	39.37	7	6,368	39.71	0	7
Democratic Alliance	2,987	18.49	0	2,953	18.41	3	3
Freedom Front Plus	2,241	13.87	2	2,168	13.52	0	2
Mafube First	1,299	8.04	0	1,436	8.95	2	2
Economic Freedom Fighters	1,102	6.82	0	1,103	6.88	1	1
Pan Africanist Congress of Azania	589	3.65	0	584	3.64	1	1
South African Communist Party	455	2.82	0	426	2.66	1	1
ActionSA	333	2.06	0	404	2.52	0	0
African Transformation Movement	251	1.55	0	326	2.03	0	0
uMkhonto weSizwe Party	278	1.72	0				0
Inkatha Freedom Party	94	0.58	0	84	0.52	0	0
Afrika Mayibuye Movement	73	0.45	0	76	0.47	0	0
African Congress for Transformation	40	0.25	0	48	0.30	0	0
Patriotic Alliance	25	0.15	0	38	0.24	0	0
Fezile Dabi Civic Movement	29	0.18	0	24	0.15	0	0
Independent candidates	1	0.01	0				0
Total	16,158	100.00	9	16,038	100.00	8	17
Valid votes	16,158	97.37		16,038	97.22		
Invalid/blank votes	437	2.63		458	2.78		
Total votes	16,595	100.00		16,496	100.00		
Registered voters/turnout	32,190	51.55		32,190	51.25		
