= Kopanong Local Municipality elections =

Local elections in the Free State, South Africa

The Kopanong Local Municipality council consists of seventeen members elected by mixed-member proportional representation. Nine councillors are elected by first-past-the-post voting in nine wards, while the remaining eight are chosen from party lists so that the total number of party representatives is proportional to the number of votes received.

In the election of 4 November 2026 the African National Congress (ANC) won a majority of ten seats on the council.

== Results ==
The following table shows the composition of the council after past elections.

Event	ANC	DA	EFF	FF+	Other	Total
2000 election	10	4	—	—	0	14
2006 election	11	2	—	0	1	14
2011 election	10	3	—	0	2	15
2016 election	11	3	1	0	0	15
2021 election	11	3	2	1	0	17
2026 election	10	4	1	1	1	17

== December 2000 election ==
The following table shows the results of the 2000 election.

Party	Ward			List			Total seats
Party	Votes	%	Seats	Votes	%	Seats	Total seats
African National Congress	8,327	65.98	7	8,789	70.14	3	10
Democratic Alliance	3,265	25.87	0	3,414	27.25	4	4
Independent candidates	826	6.55	0				0
Alliance 2000+	202	1.60	0	327	2.61	0	0
Total	12,620	100.00	7	12,530	100.00	7	14
Valid votes	12,620	96.97		12,530	96.36		
Invalid/blank votes	394	3.03		473	3.64		
Total votes	13,014	100.00		13,003	100.00		
Registered voters/turnout	21,857	59.54		21,857	59.49		

== March 2006 election ==
The following table shows the results of the 2006 election.

Party	Ward			List			Total seats
Party	Votes	%	Seats	Votes	%	Seats	Total seats
African National Congress	10,170	76.47	7	10,155	76.90	4	11
Democratic Alliance	2,014	15.14	0	2,030	15.37	2	2
Pan Africanist Congress of Azania	527	3.96	0	494	3.74	1	1
Freedom Front Plus	499	3.75	0	429	3.25	0	0
African Christian Democratic Party	39	0.29	0	98	0.74	0	0
Independent candidates	51	0.38	0				0
Total	13,300	100.00	7	13,206	100.00	7	14
Valid votes	13,300	98.15		13,206	98.32		
Invalid/blank votes	251	1.85		225	1.68		
Total votes	13,551	100.00		13,431	100.00		
Registered voters/turnout	23,771	57.01		23,771	56.50		

== May 2011 election ==
The following table shows the results of the 2011 election.

Party	Ward			List			Total seats
Party	Votes	%	Seats	Votes	%	Seats	Total seats
African National Congress	11,004	67.15	7	11,177	72.72	3	10
Democratic Alliance	2,836	17.31	0	2,636	17.15	3	3
Congress of the People	902	5.50	0	1,280	8.33	1	1
Independent candidates	1,308	7.98	1				1
Freedom Front Plus	292	1.78	0	236	1.54	0	0
United Residents Front	45	0.27	0	41	0.27	0	0
Total	16,387	100.00	8	15,370	100.00	7	15
Valid votes	16,387	98.03		15,370	92.14		
Invalid/blank votes	329	1.97		1,312	7.86		
Total votes	16,716	100.00		16,682	100.00		
Registered voters/turnout	25,157	66.45		25,157	66.31		

== August 2016 election ==
The following table shows the results of the 2016 election.

Party	Ward			List			Total seats
Party	Votes	%	Seats	Votes	%	Seats	Total seats
African National Congress	10,751	68.12	8	11,182	70.91	3	11
Democratic Alliance	2,717	17.21	0	2,833	17.97	3	3
Economic Freedom Fighters	999	6.33	0	1,348	8.55	1	1
Independent candidates	770	4.88	0				0
Freedom Front Plus	365	2.31	0	355	2.25	0	0
Congress of the People	181	1.15	0				0
United Residents Front				51	0.32	0	0
Total	15,783	100.00	8	15,769	100.00	7	15
Valid votes	15,783	97.94		15,769	97.85		
Invalid/blank votes	332	2.06		346	2.15		
Total votes	16,115	100.00		16,115	100.00		
Registered voters/turnout	25,908	62.20		25,908	62.20		

== November 2021 election ==
The following table shows the results of the 2021 election.

Party	Ward			List			Total seats
Party	Votes	%	Seats	Votes	%	Seats	Total seats
African National Congress	7,835	65.15	9	8,055	66.93	2	11
Democratic Alliance	1,996	16.60	0	1,967	16.34	3	3
Economic Freedom Fighters	1,120	9.31	0	1,299	10.79	2	2
Freedom Front Plus	624	5.19	0	626	5.20	1	1
Independent candidates	403	3.35	0				0
African Transformation Movement	48	0.40	0	88	0.73	0	0
Total	12,026	100.00	9	12,035	100.00	8	17
Valid votes	12,026	97.91		12,035	97.45		
Invalid/blank votes	257	2.09		315	2.55		
Total votes	12,283	100.00		12,350	100.00		
Registered voters/turnout	24,967	49.20		24,967	49.47		

== November 2026 election ==
The following table shows the results of the 2026 election.

Party	Ward			List			Total seats
Party	Votes	%	Seats	Votes	%	Seats	Total seats
African National Congress	8,467	52.91	8	9,065	59.03	2	10
Democratic Alliance	3,389	21.18	0	3,596	23.42	4	4
Economic Freedom Fighters	899	5.62	0	1,021	6.65	1	1
Independent candidates	1,790	11.18	1				1
Freedom Front Plus	712	4.45	0	742	4.83	1	1
Patriotic Alliance	265	1.66	0	357	2.32	0	0
South African Communist Party	264	1.65	0	273	1.78	0	0
African Transformation Movement	86	0.54	0	156	1.02	0	0
Afrika Mayibuye Movement	44	0.27	0	79	0.51	0	0
United Residents Front	10	0.06	0	68	0.44	0	0
uMkhonto weSizwe Party	56	0.35	0				0
African Congress for Transformation	22	0.14	0				0
Total	16,004	100.00	9	15,357	100.00	8	17
Valid votes	16,004	97.66		15,357	96.04		
Invalid/blank votes	383	2.34		633	3.96		
Total votes	16,387	100.00		15,990	100.00		
Registered voters/turnout	27,245	60.15		27,245	58.69		
