= Phumelela Local Municipality elections =

Local elections in the Free State, South Africa

The Phumelela Local Municipality council consists of sixteen members elected by mixed-member proportional representation. Eight councillors are elected by first-past-the-post voting in eight wards, while the remaining eight are chosen from party lists so that the total number of party representatives is proportional to the number of votes received.

In the election of 3 August 2016 the African National Congress (ANC) won a majority of twelve seats on the council.

In the 2021 South African municipal elections the ANC won a reduced majority of eleven seats on the council.

The ANC lost its majority in the 2026 election, but remained the largest party, with eight seats.

== Results ==
The following table shows the composition of the council after past elections.

Event	ANC	DA	EFF	FF+	Other	Total
2000 election	11	3	—	—	0	14
2006 election	11	1	—	1	1	14
2011 election	12	3	—	0	0	15
2016 election	12	2	1	0	0	15
2021 election	11	2	2	1	0	16
2026 election	8	3	1	2	2	16

== December 2000 election ==
The following table shows the results of the 2000 election.

Party	Ward			List			Total seats
Party	Votes	%	Seats	Votes	%	Seats	Total seats
African National Congress	10,336	80.14	7	10,366	80.30	4	11
Democratic Alliance	2,389	18.52	0	2,543	19.70	3	3
Independent candidates	173	1.34	0				0
Total	12,898	100.00	7	12,909	100.00	7	14
Valid votes	12,898	96.46		12,909	96.54		
Invalid/blank votes	473	3.54		463	3.46		
Total votes	13,371	100.00		13,372	100.00		
Registered voters/turnout	22,606	59.15		22,606	59.15		

== March 2006 election ==
The following table shows the results of the 2006 election.

Party	Ward			List			Total seats
Party	Votes	%	Seats	Votes	%	Seats	Total seats
African National Congress	10,140	80.03	7	10,129	80.13	4	11
Phumelela Ratepayers' Association	1,129	8.91	0	991	7.84	1	1
Democratic Alliance	731	5.77	0	793	6.27	1	1
Freedom Front Plus	437	3.45	0	457	3.62	1	1
Pan Africanist Congress of Azania	233	1.84	0	271	2.14	0	0
Total	12,670	100.00	7	12,641	100.00	7	14
Valid votes	12,670	97.13		12,641	96.83		
Invalid/blank votes	375	2.87		414	3.17		
Total votes	13,045	100.00		13,055	100.00		
Registered voters/turnout	23,311	55.96		23,311	56.00		

== May 2011 election ==
The following table shows the results of the 2011 election.

Party	Ward			List			Total seats
Party	Votes	%	Seats	Votes	%	Seats	Total seats
African National Congress	10,910	76.89	8	11,008	77.53	4	12
Democratic Alliance	2,491	17.55	0	2,472	17.41	3	3
Freedom Front Plus	429	3.02	0	432	3.04	0	0
Phumelela Ratepayers' Association	293	2.06	0	175	1.23	0	0
National Freedom Party	67	0.47	0	111	0.78	0	0
Total	14,190	100.00	8	14,198	100.00	7	15
Valid votes	14,190	97.49		14,198	97.63		
Invalid/blank votes	366	2.51		345	2.37		
Total votes	14,556	100.00		14,543	100.00		
Registered voters/turnout	24,579	59.22		24,579	59.17		

== August 2016 election ==
The following table shows the results of the 2016 election.

Party	Ward			List			Total seats
Party	Votes	%	Seats	Votes	%	Seats	Total seats
African National Congress	11,474	77.08	8	11,544	77.39	4	12
Democratic Alliance	2,074	13.93	0	2,112	14.16	2	2
Economic Freedom Fighters	802	5.39	0	751	5.03	1	1
Freedom Front Plus	492	3.31	0	510	3.42	0	0
Independent candidates	44	0.30	0				0
Total	14,886	100.00	8	14,917	100.00	7	15
Valid votes	14,886	97.61		14,917	97.74		
Invalid/blank votes	364	2.39		345	2.26		
Total votes	15,250	100.00		15,262	100.00		
Registered voters/turnout	25,832	59.04		25,832	59.08		

== November 2021 election ==
The following table shows the results of the 2021 election.

Party	Ward			List			Total seats
Party	Votes	%	Seats	Votes	%	Seats	Total seats
African National Congress	6,769	63.29	8	7,000	65.10	3	11
Democratic Alliance	1,235	11.55	0	1,378	12.82	2	2
Economic Freedom Fighters	1,075	10.05	0	1,211	11.26	2	2
Freedom Front Plus	567	5.30	0	615	5.72	1	1
Independent candidates	767	7.17	0				0
Inkatha Freedom Party	90	0.84	0	295	2.74	0	0
African Transformation Movement	114	1.07	0	129	1.20	0	0
African Freedom Revolution	79	0.74	0	125	1.16	0	0
Total	10,696	100.00	8	10,753	100.00	8	16
Valid votes	10,696	97.02		10,753	96.73		
Invalid/blank votes	328	2.98		364	3.27		
Total votes	11,024	100.00		11,117	100.00		
Registered voters/turnout	24,050	45.84		24,050	46.22		

== November 2026 election ==
The following table shows the results of the 2026 election.

Party	Ward			List			Total seats
Party	Votes	%	Seats	Votes	%	Seats	Total seats
African National Congress	5,513	43.91	8	5,652	45.41	0	8
Democratic Alliance	2,395	19.08	0	2,505	20.13	3	3
Freedom Front Plus	1,535	12.23	0	1,653	13.28	2	2
Service Delivery Party	686	5.46	0	856	6.88	1	1
Economic Freedom Fighters	705	5.62	0	830	6.67	1	1
uMkhonto weSizwe Party	994	7.92	0				0
African Transformation Movement	264	2.10	0	353	2.84	1	1
South African Communist Party	174	1.39	0	212	1.70	0	0
Inkatha Freedom Party	81	0.65	0	112	0.90	0	0
Afrika Mayibuye Movement	29	0.23	0	107	0.86	0	0
African People's Convention	51	0.41	0	60	0.48	0	0
Patriotic Alliance	26	0.21	0	74	0.59	0	0
African Content Movement	38	0.30	0	33	0.27	0	0
African Congress for Transformation	63	0.50	0				0
Total	12,554	100.00	8	12,447	100.00	8	16
Valid votes	12,554	96.74		12,447	95.92		
Invalid/blank votes	423	3.26		530	4.08		
Total votes	12,977	100.00		12,977	100.00		
Registered voters/turnout	25,999	49.91		25,999	49.91		
