= Tswelopele Local Municipality elections =

Local elections in the Free State, South Africa

The Tswelopele Local Municipality council consists of sixteen members elected by mixed-member proportional representation. Eight councillors are elected by first-past-the-post voting in eight wards, while the remaining eight are chosen from party lists so that the total number of party representatives is proportional to the number of votes received.

The African National Congress (ANC) has won a majority in each election prior to 2026.

In the 2026 South African municipal elections the African National Congress (ANC) lost its majority, but remains the largest party, with eight seats on the council.

== Results ==
The following table shows the composition of the council after past elections.

Event	ANC	DA	EFF	FF+	Other	Total
2000 election	11	2	—	—	—	13
2006 election	11	2	—	0	1	14
2011 election	12	2	—	0	1	15
2016 election	11	3	1	0	0	15
2021 election	10	3	2	1	1	17
2026 election	8	4	2	1	1	16

== December 2000 election ==
The following table shows the results of the 2000 election.

Party	Ward			List			Total seats
Party	Votes	%	Seats	Votes	%	Seats	Total seats
African National Congress	7,703	82.46	6	7,759	82.84	5	11
Democratic Alliance	1,639	17.54	1	1,607	17.16	1	2
Total	9,342	100.00	7	9,366	100.00	6	13
Valid votes	9,342	97.42		9,366	97.45		
Invalid/blank votes	247	2.58		245	2.55		
Total votes	9,589	100.00		9,611	100.00		
Registered voters/turnout	20,191	47.49		20,191	47.60		

== March 2006 election ==
The following table shows the results of the 2006 election.

Party	Ward			List			Total seats
Party	Votes	%	Seats	Votes	%	Seats	Total seats
African National Congress	8,109	67.92	6	8,586	83.76	5	11
Democratic Alliance	1,374	11.51	0	1,351	13.18	2	2
Independent candidates	2,231	18.69	1				1
Pan Africanist Congress of Azania	184	1.54	0	150	1.46	0	0
Freedom Front Plus	41	0.34	0	164	1.60	0	0
Total	11,939	100.00	7	10,251	100.00	7	14
Valid votes	11,939	96.47		10,251	82.70		
Invalid/blank votes	437	3.53		2,144	17.30		
Total votes	12,376	100.00		12,395	100.00		
Registered voters/turnout	22,361	55.35		22,361	55.43		

== May 2011 election ==
The following table shows the results of the 2011 election.

Party	Ward			List			Total seats
Party	Votes	%	Seats	Votes	%	Seats	Total seats
African National Congress	11,318	80.43	8	11,519	81.51	4	12
Democratic Alliance	1,675	11.90	0	1,640	11.60	2	2
Congress of the People	784	5.57	0	738	5.22	1	1
Freedom Front Plus	294	2.09	0	235	1.66	0	0
Total	14,071	100.00	8	14,132	100.00	7	15
Valid votes	14,071	97.73		14,132	98.12		
Invalid/blank votes	327	2.27		271	1.88		
Total votes	14,398	100.00		14,403	100.00		
Registered voters/turnout	24,197	59.50		24,197	59.52		

== August 2016 election ==
The following table shows the results of the 2016 election.

Party	Ward			List			Total seats
Party	Votes	%	Seats	Votes	%	Seats	Total seats
African National Congress	11,231	72.63	8	11,237	72.84	3	11
Democratic Alliance	2,521	16.30	0	2,473	16.03	3	3
Economic Freedom Fighters	1,217	7.87	0	1,183	7.67	1	1
Freedom Front Plus	266	1.72	0	280	1.81	0	0
Congress of the People	103	0.67	0	140	0.91	0	0
African People's Convention	125	0.81	0	114	0.74	0	0
Total	15,463	100.00	8	15,427	100.00	7	15
Valid votes	15,463	97.97		15,427	98.10		
Invalid/blank votes	320	2.03		299	1.90		
Total votes	15,783	100.00		15,726	100.00		
Registered voters/turnout	26,233	60.16		26,233	59.95		

== November 2021 election ==
The following table shows the results of the 2021 election.

Party	Ward			List			Total seats
Party	Votes	%	Seats	Votes	%	Seats	Total seats
African National Congress	7,116	61.41	9	7,174	61.80	1	10
Democratic Alliance	1,829	15.78	0	1,810	15.59	3	3
Economic Freedom Fighters	1,322	11.41	0	1,344	11.58	2	2
Tikwana Youth Power	669	5.77	0	668	5.75	1	1
Freedom Front Plus	410	3.54	0	403	3.47	1	1
African Transformation Movement	135	1.16	0	137	1.18	0	0
Congress of the People	33	0.28	0	40	0.34	0	0
Independent candidates	67	0.58	0				0
National Freedom Party	7	0.06	0	33	0.28	0	0
Total	11,588	100.00	9	11,609	100.00	8	17
Valid votes	11,588	97.27		11,609	97.34		
Invalid/blank votes	325	2.73		317	2.66		
Total votes	11,913	100.00		11,926	100.00		
Registered voters/turnout	25,856	46.07		25,856	46.12		

== November 2026 election ==
The following table shows the results of the 2026 election.

Party	Ward			List			Total seats
Party	Votes	%	Seats	Votes	%	Seats	Total seats
African National Congress	8,091	51.69	8	8,009	51.30	0	8
Democratic Alliance	3,315	21.18	0	3,331	21.34	4	4
Economic Freedom Fighters	1,657	10.59	0	1,661	10.64	2	2
South African Communist Party	1,347	8.61	0	1,355	8.68	1	1
Freedom Front Plus	583	3.72	0	584	3.74	1	1
Tikwana Youth Power	322	2.06	0	332	2.13	0	0
African Transformation Movement	168	1.07	0	179	1.15	0	0
Patriotic Alliance	54	0.34	0	72	0.46	0	0
Afrika Mayibuye Movement	44	0.28	0	49	0.31	0	0
Pan Africanist Congress of Azania	31	0.20	0	40	0.26	0	0
uMkhonto weSizwe Party	32	0.20	0				0
African Congress for Transformation	9	0.06	0				0
Total	15,653	100.00	8	15,612	100.00	8	16
Valid votes	15,653	97.97		15,612	97.67		
Invalid/blank votes	324	2.03		372	2.33		
Total votes	15,977	100.00		15,984	100.00		
Registered voters/turnout	28,107	56.84		28,107	56.87		
