= Johannes Phumani Phungula Local Municipality elections =

Local elections in KwaZulu-Natal, South Africa

The council of the Johannes Phumani Phungula Local Municipality (formerly Ubuhlebezwe Local Municipality) consists of twenty-six members elected by mixed-member proportional representation. Thirteen councillors are elected by first-past-the-post voting in thirteen wards, while the remaining thirteen are chosen from party lists so that the total number of party representatives is proportional to the number of votes received.

In the election of 4 November 2026, the African National Congress (ANC) lost its majority, with the uMkhonto weSizwe Party (MKP) winning plurality of thirteen seats.

== Results ==
The following table shows the composition of the council after past elections.

Event	ANC	DA	EFF	IND	IFP	NFP	MKP	Other	Total
2000 election	10	1	—	0	12	—	—	—	23
2006 election	16	1	—	0	5	—	—	1	23
2011 election	18	1	—	—	2	3	—	0	24
2016 election	20	1	2	2	2	—	—	—	27
2021 election	18	1	3	1	2	1	—	1	27
2026 election	8	1	1	—	3	0	13	0	26

== December 2000 election ==
The following table shows the results of the 2000 election.

Party	Ward			List			Total seats
Party	Votes	%	Seats	Votes	%	Seats	Total seats
Inkatha Freedom Party	9,528	51.50	8	9,657	52.19	4	12
African National Congress	7,895	42.67	4	7,923	42.82	6	10
Democratic Alliance	635	3.43	0	924	4.99	1	1
Independent candidates	444	2.40	0				0
Total	18,502	100.00	12	18,504	100.00	11	23
Valid votes	18,502	97.53		18,504	97.46		
Invalid/blank votes	468	2.47		482	2.54		
Total votes	18,970	100.00		18,986	100.00		
Registered voters/turnout	38,804	48.89		38,804	48.93		

== March 2006 election ==
The following table shows the results of the 2006 election.

Party	Ward			List			Total seats
Party	Votes	%	Seats	Votes	%	Seats	Total seats
African National Congress	14,456	68.55	11	14,421	68.40	5	16
Inkatha Freedom Party	5,078	24.08	1	5,082	24.11	4	5
National Democratic Convention	577	2.74	0	649	3.08	1	1
Democratic Alliance	497	2.36	0	548	2.60	1	1
African Christian Democratic Party	426	2.02	0	382	1.81	0	0
Independent candidates	53	0.25	0				0
Total	21,087	100.00	12	21,082	100.00	11	23
Valid votes	21,087	97.75		21,082	97.83		
Invalid/blank votes	485	2.25		468	2.17		
Total votes	21,572	100.00		21,550	100.00		
Registered voters/turnout	40,413	53.38		40,413	53.32		

== May 2011 election ==
The following table shows the results of the 2011 election.

Party	Ward			List			Total seats
Party	Votes	%	Seats	Votes	%	Seats	Total seats
African National Congress	19,824	74.20	12	20,110	75.55	6	18
National Freedom Party	3,496	13.09	0	3,182	11.95	3	3
Inkatha Freedom Party	2,053	7.68	0	2,015	7.57	2	2
Democratic Alliance	1,146	4.29	0	1,065	4.00	1	1
African Christian Democratic Party	168	0.63	0	153	0.57	0	0
United Democratic Movement	30	0.11	0	93	0.35	0	0
Total	26,717	100.00	12	26,618	100.00	12	24
Valid votes	26,717	97.96		26,618	98.07		
Invalid/blank votes	557	2.04		524	1.93		
Total votes	27,274	100.00		27,142	100.00		
Registered voters/turnout	45,216	60.32		45,216	60.03		

== August 2016 election ==
The following table shows the results of the 2016 election.

Party	Ward			List			Total seats
Party	Votes	%	Seats	Votes	%	Seats	Total seats
African National Congress	25,842	72.24	12	28,296	79.84	8	20
Economic Freedom Fighters	2,983	8.34	0	3,084	8.70	2	2
Inkatha Freedom Party	2,778	7.77	0	2,846	8.03	2	2
Independent candidates	3,070	8.58	2				2
Democratic Alliance	1,099	3.07	0	1,213	3.42	1	1
Total	35,772	100.00	14	35,439	100.00	13	27
Valid votes	35,772	97.29		35,439	96.73		
Invalid/blank votes	997	2.71		1,199	3.27		
Total votes	36,769	100.00		36,638	100.00		
Registered voters/turnout	57,399	64.06		57,399	63.83		

== November 2021 election ==
The following table shows the results of the 2021 election.

Party	Ward			List			Total seats
Party	Votes	%	Seats	Votes	%	Seats	Total seats
African National Congress	18,094	61.68	13	18,694	64.42	5	18
Economic Freedom Fighters	3,375	11.50	0	3,698	12.74	3	3
Inkatha Freedom Party	2,043	6.96	0	2,790	9.61	2	2
Independent candidates	3,280	11.18	1				1
Democratic Alliance	1,026	3.50	0	1,104	3.80	1	1
African Independent Congress	813	2.77	0	1,046	3.60	1	1
National Freedom Party	187	0.64	0	944	3.25	1	1
People's Freedom Party	210	0.72	0	178	0.61	0	0
Abantu Batho Congress	114	0.39	0	152	0.52	0	0
African Transformation Movement	68	0.23	0	194	0.67	0	0
African Christian Democratic Party	99	0.34	0	127	0.44	0	0
South African Peoples Movement	27	0.09	0	92	0.32	0	0
Total	29,336	100.00	14	29,019	100.00	13	27
Valid votes	29,336	96.22		29,019	95.89		
Invalid/blank votes	1,154	3.78		1,245	4.11		
Total votes	30,490	100.00		30,264	100.00		
Registered voters/turnout	57,551	52.98		57,551	52.59		

=== By-elections from November 2021 ===
The following by-elections were held to fill vacant ward seats in the period since the election in November 2021.

Date	Ward	Party of the previous councillor	Party of the newly elected councillor
22 March 2023	8	African National Congress	African National Congress

In a by-election in ward 8, held on 22 March 2023 after the death of the previous ANC councillor, the ANC retained the seat with a 70% majority. The Inkatha Freedom Party (IFP) took second place (20%) from the Economic Freedom Fighters (EFF) (10%).

== November 2026 election ==
The following table shows the results of the 2026 election.

Party	Ward			List			Total seats
Party	Votes	%	Seats	Votes	%	Seats	Total seats
uMkhonto weSizwe Party	16,298	47.04	13	16,843	48.64	0	13
African National Congress	10,248	29.58	0	10,212	29.49	8	8
Inkatha Freedom Party	3,952	11.41	0	4,030	11.64	3	3
Democratic Alliance	1,259	3.63	0	1,303	3.76	1	1
Economic Freedom Fighters	803	2.32	0	809	2.34	1	1
African Independent Congress	370	1.07	0	528	1.52	0	0
Independent candidates	856	2.47	0				0
South African Communist Party	346	1.00	0	317	0.92	0	0
Afrika Mayibuye Movement	159	0.46	0	129	0.37	0	0
African Transformation Movement	99	0.29	0	179	0.52	0	0
Activists Movement of South Africa	126	0.36	0	143	0.41	0	0
National Freedom Party	134	0.39	0	134	0.39	0	0
Total	34,650	100.00	13	34,627	100.00	13	26
Valid votes	34,650	97.84		34,627	97.90		
Invalid/blank votes	766	2.16		743	2.10		
Total votes	35,416	100.00		35,370	100.00		
Registered voters/turnout	62,183	56.95		62,183	56.88		
