= Greater Kokstad Local Municipality elections =

Local elections in KwaZulu-Natal, South Africa

The Greater Kokstad Local Municipality council consists of nineteen members elected by mixed-member proportional representation. Ten councillors are elected by first-past-the-post voting in ten wards, while the remaining nine are chosen from party lists so that the total number of party representatives is proportional to the number of votes received.

In the election of 4 November 2026 the African National Congress (ANC) won a reduced majority of eleven seats on the council.

== Results ==
The following table shows the composition of the council after past elections.

Event	AIC	ANC	DA	EFF	MKP	Other	Total
2000 election	—	9	2	—	—	0	11
2006 election	—	10	1	—	—	0	11
2011 election	1	12	3	—	—	0	16
2016 election	1	13	3	2	—	0	19
2021 election	1	12	2	4	—	0	19
2026 election	0	11	2	2	4	2	19

== December 2000 election ==
The following table shows the results of the 2000 election.

Party	Ward			List			Total seats
Party	Votes	%	Seats	Votes	%	Seats	Total seats
African National Congress	6,116	79.91	6	6,084	79.72	3	9
Democratic Alliance	1,199	15.67	0	1,169	15.32	2	2
African Christian Democratic Party	339	4.43	0	379	4.97	0	0
Total	7,654	100.00	6	7,632	100.00	5	11
Valid votes	7,654	97.63		7,632	97.42		
Invalid/blank votes	186	2.37		202	2.58		
Total votes	7,840	100.00		7,834	100.00		
Registered voters/turnout	17,163	45.68		17,163	45.64		

== March 2006 election ==
The following table shows the results of the 2006 election.

Party	Ward			List			Total seats
Party	Votes	%	Seats	Votes	%	Seats	Total seats
African National Congress	10,646	84.42	6	10,822	85.27	4	10
Democratic Alliance	674	5.34	0	1,023	8.06	1	1
Pan Africanist Congress of Azania	406	3.22	0	308	2.43	0	0
United Democratic Movement	348	2.76	0	327	2.58	0	0
Inkatha Freedom Party	323	2.56	0	147	1.16	0	0
Independent candidates	168	1.33	0				0
National Democratic Convention	46	0.36	0	64	0.50	0	0
Total	12,611	100.00	6	12,691	100.00	5	11
Valid votes	12,611	98.00		12,691	97.94		
Invalid/blank votes	257	2.00		267	2.06		
Total votes	12,868	100.00		12,958	100.00		
Registered voters/turnout	25,163	51.14		25,163	51.50		

== May 2011 election ==
The following table shows the results of the 2011 election.

Party	Ward			List			Total seats
Party	Votes	%	Seats	Votes	%	Seats	Total seats
African National Congress	15,467	77.58	8	14,401	72.70	4	12
Democratic Alliance	3,277	16.44	0	3,178	16.04	3	3
African Independent Congress	182	0.91	0	1,465	7.40	1	1
Congress of the People	475	2.38	0	446	2.25	0	0
African Christian Democratic Party	138	0.69	0	129	0.65	0	0
Independent candidates	236	1.18	0				0
United Democratic Movement	63	0.32	0	115	0.58	0	0
Inkatha Freedom Party	100	0.50	0	76	0.38	0	0
Total	19,938	100.00	8	19,810	100.00	8	16
Valid votes	19,938	97.86		19,810	97.07		
Invalid/blank votes	435	2.14		597	2.93		
Total votes	20,373	100.00		20,407	100.00		
Registered voters/turnout	36,849	55.29		36,849	55.38		

== August 2016 election ==
The following table shows the results of the 2016 election.

Party	Ward			List			Total seats
Party	Votes	%	Seats	Votes	%	Seats	Total seats
African National Congress	12,967	59.09	10	13,696	62.79	3	13
Democratic Alliance	3,443	15.69	0	3,621	16.60	3	3
Economic Freedom Fighters	1,922	8.76	0	3,123	14.32	2	2
Independent candidates	2,884	13.14	0				0
African Independent Congress	679	3.09	0	1,080	4.95	1	1
Kingdom Governance Movement	43	0.20	0	151	0.69	0	0
Inkatha Freedom Party	5	0.02	0	141	0.65	0	0
Total	21,943	100.00	10	21,812	100.00	9	19
Valid votes	21,943	96.35		21,812	95.16		
Invalid/blank votes	832	3.65		1,109	4.84		
Total votes	22,775	100.00		22,921	100.00		
Registered voters/turnout	42,169	54.01		42,169	54.36		

== November 2021 election ==
The following table shows the results of the 2021 election.

Party	Ward			List			Total seats
Party	Votes	%	Seats	Votes	%	Seats	Total seats
African National Congress	11,886	59.54	10	11,888	59.21	2	12
Economic Freedom Fighters	4,256	21.32	0	4,249	21.16	4	4
Democratic Alliance	2,409	12.07	0	2,359	11.75	2	2
African Independent Congress	293	1.47	0	380	1.89	1	1
Patriotic Alliance	231	1.16	0	266	1.32	0	0
African Christian Democratic Party	237	1.19	0	259	1.29	0	0
African Transformation Movement	204	1.02	0	270	1.34	0	0
Inkatha Freedom Party	218	1.09	0	232	1.16	0	0
United Democratic Movement	128	0.64	0	150	0.75	0	0
Independent candidates	71	0.36	0				0
Abantu Batho Congress	29	0.15	0	26	0.13	0	0
Total	19,962	100.00	10	20,079	100.00	9	19
Valid votes	19,962	96.95		20,079	97.11		
Invalid/blank votes	629	3.05		597	2.89		
Total votes	20,591	100.00		20,676	100.00		
Registered voters/turnout	43,691	47.13		43,691	47.32		

== November 2026 election ==
The following table shows the results of the 2026 election.

Party	Ward			List			Total seats
Party	Votes	%	Seats	Votes	%	Seats	Total seats
African National Congress	11,735	47.48	11	11,737	47.22	0	11
uMkhonto weSizwe Party	5,420	21.93	0	5,519	22.21	4	4
Democratic Alliance	2,986	12.08	0	3,061	12.32	2	2
Economic Freedom Fighters	1,881	7.61	0	1,905	7.66	2	2
Patriotic Alliance	627	2.54	0	606	2.44	1	1
African Transformation Movement	461	1.87	0	464	1.87	1	1
Freedom Front Plus	417	1.69	0	433	1.74	0	0
African Independent Congress	406	1.64	0	387	1.56	0	0
South African Communist Party	388	1.57	0	353	1.42	0	0
Inkatha Freedom Party	265	1.07	0	248	1.00	0	0
Afrika Mayibuye Movement	76	0.31	0	84	0.34	0	0
Pan Africanist Congress of Azania	44	0.18	0	42	0.17	0	0
Bumbana Mzansi	12	0.05	0	15	0.06	0	0
Total	24,718	100.00	11	24,854	100.00	10	21
Valid votes	24,718	97.40		24,854	97.87		
Invalid/blank votes	659	2.60		540	2.13		
Total votes	25,377	100.00		25,394	100.00		
Registered voters/turnout	48,778	52.03		48,778	52.06		
