= Dr Nkosazana Dlamini-Zuma Local Municipality elections =

Local elections in KwaZulu-Natal, South Africa

The Dr Nkosazana Dlamini-Zuma Local Municipality council consists of twenty-nine members elected by mixed-member proportional representation. Fifteen councillors are elected by first-past-the-post voting in fifteen wards, while the remaining fourteen are chosen from party lists so that the total number of party representatives is proportional to the number of votes received.

It was established for the August 2016 local elections by the merging of Ingwe and Kwa Sani local municipalities.

In the election of 4 November 2026, no party won a majority. The uMkhonto weSizwe Party (MLP) won the largest number of seats on the council, with 12.

== Results ==
The following table shows the composition of the council after past elections.

Event	ANC	DA	EFF	IFP	MKP	Other	Total
2016 election	23	3	1	2	—	0	29
2021 election	16	3	6	4	—	0	29
2021 election	11	2	1	3	12	0	29

== August 2016 election ==
The following table shows the results of the 2016 election.

Party	Ward			List			Total seats
Party	Votes	%	Seats	Votes	%	Seats	Total seats
African National Congress	28,724	80.19	15	29,046	81.00	8	23
Democratic Alliance	3,076	8.59	0	3,003	8.37	3	3
Inkatha Freedom Party	2,417	6.75	0	2,362	6.59	2	2
Economic Freedom Fighters	1,478	4.13	0	1,447	4.04	1	1
Independent candidates	127	0.35	0				0
Total	35,822	100.00	15	35,858	100.00	14	29
Valid votes	35,822	96.65		35,858	96.85		
Invalid/blank votes	1,240	3.35		1,168	3.15		
Total votes	37,062	100.00		37,026	100.00		
Registered voters/turnout	56,529	65.56		56,529	65.50		

== November 2021 election ==
The following table shows the results of the 2021 election.

Party	Ward			List			Total seats
Party	Votes	%	Seats	Votes	%	Seats	Total seats
African National Congress	16,250	52.34	14	17,073	55.25	2	16
Economic Freedom Fighters	5,805	18.70	0	6,005	19.43	6	6
Inkatha Freedom Party	4,274	13.77	1	4,454	14.41	3	4
Democratic Alliance	2,411	7.77	0	2,430	7.86	3	3
Independent candidates	1,632	5.26	0				0
People's Freedom Party	249	0.80	0	243	0.79	0	0
National Freedom Party	133	0.43	0	196	0.63	0	0
Abantu Batho Congress	151	0.49	0	162	0.52	0	0
African Christian Democratic Party	98	0.32	0	121	0.39	0	0
African Transformation Movement	36	0.12	0	101	0.33	0	0
Congress of the People	7	0.02	0	119	0.39	0	0
Total	31,046	100.00	15	30,904	100.00	14	29
Valid votes	31,046	97.44		30,904	97.30		
Invalid/blank votes	817	2.56		858	2.70		
Total votes	31,863	100.00		31,762	100.00		
Registered voters/turnout	57,336	55.57		57,336	55.40		

== November 2026 election ==
The following table shows the results of the 2026 election.

Party	Ward			List			Total seats
Party	Votes	%	Seats	Votes	%	Seats	Total seats
uMkhonto weSizwe Party	13,730	39.46	8	14,020	40.10	4	12
African National Congress	12,630	36.30	5	12,599	36.03	6	11
Inkatha Freedom Party	3,997	11.49	1	3,913	11.19	2	3
Democratic Alliance	2,879	8.27	1	2,839	8.12	1	2
Economic Freedom Fighters	731	2.10	0	722	2.06	1	1
South African Communist Party	536	1.54	0	522	1.49	0	0
Afrika Mayibuye Movement	190	0.55	0	222	0.63	0	0
African Transformation Movement	28	0.08	0	96	0.27	0	0
Truth and Solidarity Movement	42	0.12	0	32	0.09	0	0
African Renaissance Unity	29	0.08	0				0
Total	34,792	100.00	15	34,965	100.00	14	29
Valid votes	34,792	98.28		34,965	98.60		
Invalid/blank votes	610	1.72		497	1.40		
Total votes	35,402	100.00		35,462	100.00		
Registered voters/turnout	61,948	57.15		61,948	57.24		
