= Tokologo Local Municipality elections =

Local elections in the Free State, South Africa

The Tokologo Local Municipality council consists of thirteen members elected by mixed-member proportional representation. Seven councillors are elected by first-past-the-post voting in seven wards, while the remaining six are chosen from party lists so that the total number of party representatives is proportional to the number of votes received.

In the elections of 4 November 2026 the African National Congress (ANC) won a majority of 7 seats on the council.

== Results ==
The following table shows the composition of the council after past elections.

Event	ANC	DA	EFF	FF+	Other	Total
2000 election	5	2	—	—	—	7
2006 election	6	1	—	1	0	8
2011 election	5	1	—	0	2	8
2016 election	5	1	1	0	1	8
2021 election	8	2	2	1	0	13
2026 election	7	2	2	1	1	13

== December 2000 election ==
The following table shows the results of the 2000 election.

Party	Ward			List			Total seats
Party	Votes	%	Seats	Votes	%	Seats	Total seats
African National Congress	4,304	75.92	4	4,328	76.40	1	5
Democratic Alliance	1,365	24.08	0	1,337	23.60	2	2
Total	5,669	100.00	4	5,665	100.00	3	7
Valid votes	5,669	97.01		5,665	96.94		
Invalid/blank votes	175	2.99		179	3.06		
Total votes	5,844	100.00		5,844	100.00		
Registered voters/turnout	11,338	51.54		11,338	51.54		

== March 2006 election ==
The following table shows the results of the 2006 election.

Party	Ward			List			Total seats
Party	Votes	%	Seats	Votes	%	Seats	Total seats
African National Congress	3,973	74.60	4	4,085	78.42	2	6
Democratic Alliance	581	10.91	0	628	12.06	1	1
Freedom Front Plus	346	6.50	0	368	7.06	1	1
Pan Africanist Congress of Azania	194	3.64	0	128	2.46	0	0
Independent candidates	232	4.36	0				0
Total	5,326	100.00	4	5,209	100.00	4	8
Valid votes	5,326	98.79		5,209	98.75		
Invalid/blank votes	65	1.21		66	1.25		
Total votes	5,391	100.00		5,275	100.00		
Registered voters/turnout	12,234	44.07		12,234	43.12		

== May 2011 election ==
The following table shows the results of the 2011 election.

Party	Ward			List			Total seats
Party	Votes	%	Seats	Votes	%	Seats	Total seats
African National Congress	4,189	60.75	3	4,798	72.75	2	5
Democratic Alliance	939	13.62	0	959	14.54	1	1
Congress of the People	470	6.82	0	535	8.11	1	1
Independent candidates	957	13.88	1				1
Freedom Front Plus	340	4.93	0	303	4.59	0	0
Total	6,895	100.00	4	6,595	100.00	4	8
Valid votes	6,895	97.44		6,595	93.93		
Invalid/blank votes	181	2.56		426	6.07		
Total votes	7,076	100.00		7,021	100.00		
Registered voters/turnout	12,405	57.04		12,405	56.60		

== August 2016 election ==
The following table shows the results of the 2016 election.

Party	Ward			List			Total seats
Party	Votes	%	Seats	Votes	%	Seats	Total seats
African National Congress	5,432	65.71	4	5,493	65.68	1	5
Democratic Alliance	1,045	12.64	0	1,072	12.82	1	1
Patriotic Alliance	848	10.26	0	895	10.70	1	1
Economic Freedom Fighters	467	5.65	0	483	5.78	1	1
Freedom Front Plus	218	2.64	0	235	2.81	0	0
Congress of the People	163	1.97	0	185	2.21	0	0
Independent candidates	94	1.14	0				0
Total	8,267	100.00	4	8,363	100.00	4	8
Valid votes	8,267	95.84		8,363	97.45		
Invalid/blank votes	359	4.16		219	2.55		
Total votes	8,626	100.00		8,582	100.00		
Registered voters/turnout	13,761	62.68		13,761	62.36		

== November 2021 election ==
The following table shows the results of the 2021 election.

Party	Ward			List			Total seats
Party	Votes	%	Seats	Votes	%	Seats	Total seats
African National Congress	4,019	53.92	6	4,443	59.77	2	8
Democratic Alliance	1,208	16.21	1	1,388	18.67	1	2
Economic Freedom Fighters	1,040	13.95	0	1,167	15.70	2	2
Independent candidates	875	11.74	0				0
Freedom Front Plus	264	3.54	0	350	4.71	1	1
African Transformation Movement	48	0.64	0	86	1.16	0	0
Total	7,454	100.00	7	7,434	100.00	6	13
Valid votes	7,454	97.76		7,434	97.50		
Invalid/blank votes	171	2.24		191	2.50		
Total votes	7,625	100.00		7,625	100.00		
Registered voters/turnout	13,614	56.01		13,614	56.01		

== November 2026 election ==
The following table shows the results of the 2026 election.

Party	Ward			List			Total seats
Party	Votes	%	Seats	Votes	%	Seats	Total seats
African National Congress	4,429	51.34	7	4,378	51.16	0	7
Democratic Alliance	1,359	15.75	0	1,389	16.23	2	2
Economic Freedom Fighters	1,100	12.75	0	1,072	12.53	2	2
South African Communist Party	969	11.23	0	969	11.32	1	1
Freedom Front Plus	484	5.61	0	483	5.64	1	1
Afrika Mayibuye Movement	135	1.56	0	149	1.74	0	0
Patriotic Alliance	42	0.49	0	75	0.88	0	0
African Transformation Movement	39	0.45	0	43	0.50	0	0
uMkhonto weSizwe Party	41	0.48	0				0
Independent candidates	15	0.17	0				0
African Congress for Transformation	14	0.16	0				0
Total	8,627	100.00	7	8,558	100.00	6	13
Valid votes	8,627	97.80		8,558	97.85		
Invalid/blank votes	194	2.20		188	2.15		
Total votes	8,821	100.00		8,746	100.00		
Registered voters/turnout	15,311	57.61		15,311	57.12		
