= Emalahleni Local Municipality, Eastern Cape elections =

Local elections in the Eastern Cape, South Africa

The Emalahleni Local Municipality council consists of thirty-three members elected by mixed-member proportional representation. Seventeen councillors are elected by first-past-the-post voting in seventeen wards, while the remaining sixteen are chosen from party lists so that the total number of party representatives is proportional to the number of votes received.

In the election of 4 November 2026 the African National Congress (ANC) won a reduced majority of twenty-four seats.

== Results ==
The following table shows the composition of the council after past elections.

Event	ANC	DA	EFF	PAC	UDM	Other	Total
2000 election	23	0	—	2	2	0	27
2006 election	28	0	—	1	1	1	31
2011 election	30	1	—	1	1	1	34
2016 election	28	4	1	—	1	0	34
2021 election	28	2	2	—	1	1	34
2026 election	24	4	1	—	0	4	33

== December 2000 election ==
The following table shows the results of the 2000 election.

Party	Ward			List			Total seats
Party	Votes	%	Seats	Votes	%	Seats	Total seats
African National Congress	16,803	83.03	12	22,740	86.01	11	23
United Democratic Movement	1,371	6.77	1	1,670	6.32	1	2
Pan Africanist Congress of Azania	1,554	7.68	1	1,454	5.50	1	2
Democratic Alliance	210	1.04	0	576	2.18	0	0
Independent candidates	300	1.48	0				0
Total	20,238	100.00	14	26,440	100.00	13	27
Valid votes	20,238	91.76		26,440	98.09		
Invalid/blank votes	1,818	8.24		516	1.91		
Total votes	22,056	100.00		26,956	100.00		
Registered voters/turnout	48,487	45.49		48,487	55.59		

== March 2006 election ==
The following table shows the results of the 2006 election.

Party	Ward			List			Total seats
Party	Votes	%	Seats	Votes	%	Seats	Total seats
African National Congress	29,618	89.00	15	29,789	91.38	13	28
United Democratic Movement	1,298	3.90	0	1,545	4.74	1	1
Pan Africanist Congress of Azania	752	2.26	0	853	2.62	1	1
Independent candidates	1,123	3.37	1				1
Democratic Alliance	486	1.46	0	412	1.26	0	0
Total	33,277	100.00	16	32,599	100.00	15	31
Valid votes	33,277	97.84		32,599	96.73		
Invalid/blank votes	733	2.16		1,101	3.27		
Total votes	34,010	100.00		33,700	100.00		
Registered voters/turnout	57,910	58.73		57,910	58.19		

== May 2011 election ==
The following table shows the results of the 2011 election.

Party	Ward			List			Total seats
Party	Votes	%	Seats	Votes	%	Seats	Total seats
African National Congress	28,521	80.09	17	29,916	86.71	13	30
Independent candidates	3,288	9.23	0				0
Democratic Alliance	1,217	3.42	0	1,622	4.70	1	1
United Democratic Movement	1,082	3.04	0	891	2.58	1	1
Congress of the People	500	1.40	0	1,086	3.15	1	1
Pan Africanist Movement	579	1.63	0	562	1.63	1	1
Pan Africanist Congress of Azania	422	1.19	0	423	1.23	0	0
Total	35,609	100.00	17	34,500	100.00	17	34
Valid votes	35,609	97.97		34,500	95.62		
Invalid/blank votes	739	2.03		1,581	4.38		
Total votes	36,348	100.00		36,081	100.00		
Registered voters/turnout	58,105	62.56		58,105	62.10		

== August 2016 election ==
The following table shows the results of the 2016 election.

Party	Ward			List			Total seats
Party	Votes	%	Seats	Votes	%	Seats	Total seats
African National Congress	29,489	82.19	17	29,449	82.19	11	28
Democratic Alliance	4,201	11.71	0	4,019	11.22	4	4
Economic Freedom Fighters	912	2.54	0	983	2.74	1	1
United Democratic Movement	783	2.18	0	733	2.05	1	1
African People's Convention	252	0.70	0	282	0.79	0	0
Pan Africanist Movement	181	0.50	0	243	0.68	0	0
Congress of the People	63	0.18	0	122	0.34	0	0
Total	35,881	100.00	17	35,831	100.00	17	34
Valid votes	35,881	97.84		35,831	97.74		
Invalid/blank votes	794	2.16		830	2.26		
Total votes	36,675	100.00		36,661	100.00		
Registered voters/turnout	61,471	59.66		61,471	59.64		

== November 2021 election ==
The following table shows the results of the 2021 election.

Party	Ward			List			Total seats
Party	Votes	%	Seats	Votes	%	Seats	Total seats
African National Congress	24,405	79.73	17	24,926	81.52	11	28
Democratic Alliance	1,889	6.17	0	1,946	6.36	2	2
Economic Freedom Fighters	1,608	5.25	0	1,634	5.34	2	2
United Democratic Movement	620	2.03	0	767	2.51	1	1
Independent South African National Civic Organisation	619	2.02	0	703	2.30	1	1
Independent candidates	1,003	3.28	0				0
African Transformation Movement	259	0.85	0	422	1.38	0	0
African People's Convention	205	0.67	0	179	0.59	0	0
Total	30,608	100.00	17	30,577	100.00	17	34
Valid votes	30,608	98.04		30,577	97.89		
Invalid/blank votes	611	1.96		660	2.11		
Total votes	31,219	100.00		31,237	100.00		
Registered voters/turnout	59,230	52.71		59,230	52.74		

=== By-elections from November 2021 ===
The following by-elections were held to fill vacant ward seats in the period since November 2021.

Date	Ward	Party of the previous councillor	Party of the newly elected councillor
3 Sep 2025	4	African National Congress	African National Congress

== November 2026 election ==
The following table shows the results of the 2026 election.

Party	Ward			List			Total seats
Party	Votes	%	Seats	Votes	%	Seats	Total seats
African National Congress	22,147	69.07	17	22,872	71.75	7	24
Democratic Alliance	3,323	10.36	0	3,605	11.31	4	4
South African Communist Party	1,659	5.17	0	1,818	5.70	2	2
Economic Freedom Fighters	1,252	3.90	0	1,374	4.31	1	1
Independent candidates	1,135	3.54	0				0
Iliso Labantu Movement for Social Change	480	1.50	0	501	1.57	1	1
United Democratic Movement	852	2.66	0				0
African Transformation Movement	335	1.04	0	504	1.58	1	1
uMkhonto weSizwe Party	264	0.82	0	339	1.06	0	0
Afrika Mayibuye Movement	154	0.48	0	248	0.78	0	0
Al Jama-ah	170	0.53	0	177	0.56	0	0
African People's Convention	122	0.38	0	187	0.59	0	0
Patriotic Alliance	150	0.47	0	152	0.48	0	0
African Movement Congress	21	0.07	0	102	0.32	0	0
Total	32,064	100.00	17	31,879	100.00	16	33
Valid votes	32,064	97.00		31,879	96.48		
Invalid/blank votes	993	3.00		1,162	3.52		
Total votes	33,057	100.00		33,041	100.00		
Registered voters/turnout	64,177	51.51		64,177	51.48		
