= Moqhaka Local Municipality elections =

Local elections in the Free State, South Africa

The Moqhaka Local Municipality council consists of forty members elected by mixed-member proportional representation. Twenty councillors are elected by first-past-the-post voting in twenty wards, while the remaining twenty-two are chosen from party lists so that the total number of party representatives is proportional to the number of votes received.

In the 2026 South African municipal elections, no party won a majority. The African National Congress (ANC) won the largest number of seats on the council, with fifteen.

== Results ==
The following table shows the composition of the council after past elections.

Event	ANC	COPE	DA	EFF	FF+	PAC	Other	Total
2000 election	37	—	9	—	—	1	1	48
2006 election	38	—	7	—	2	2	1	50
2011 election	34	3	11	—	1	—	1	50
2016 election	27	1	11	4	2	—	0	45
2021 election	22	0	10	5	3	—	4	44
2026 election	15	—	13	4	3	—	5	40

== December 2000 election ==
The following table shows the results of the 2000 election.

Party	Ward			List			Total seats
Party	Votes	%	Seats	Votes	%	Seats	Total seats
African National Congress	29,800	75.09	20	30,373	76.89	17	37
Democratic Alliance	6,747	17.00	4	7,111	18.00	5	9
Pan Africanist Congress of Azania	797	2.01	0	822	2.08	1	1
Independent candidates	1,451	3.66	0				0
Azanian People's Organisation	413	1.04	0	491	1.24	1	1
United Democratic Movement	472	1.19	0	394	1.00	0	0
African Christian Democratic Party	8	0.02	0	313	0.79	0	0
Total	39,688	100.00	24	39,504	100.00	24	48
Valid votes	39,688	98.05		39,504	97.76		
Invalid/blank votes	788	1.95		905	2.24		
Total votes	40,476	100.00		40,409	100.00		
Registered voters/turnout	80,094	50.54		80,094	50.45		

== March 2006 election ==
The following table shows the results of the 2006 election.

Party	Ward			List			Total seats
Party	Votes	%	Seats	Votes	%	Seats	Total seats
African National Congress	26,678	74.93	21	27,184	76.86	17	38
Democratic Alliance	4,794	13.46	4	4,774	13.50	3	7
Freedom Front Plus	1,244	3.49	0	1,282	3.62	2	2
Pan Africanist Congress of Azania	1,134	3.18	0	993	2.81	2	2
African Christian Democratic Party	671	1.88	0	552	1.56	1	1
Independent candidates	697	1.96	0				0
Azanian People's Organisation	260	0.73	0	349	0.99	0	0
Socialist Party of Azania	127	0.36	0	236	0.67	0	0
Total	35,605	100.00	25	35,370	100.00	25	50
Valid votes	35,605	98.12		35,370	97.71		
Invalid/blank votes	681	1.88		829	2.29		
Total votes	36,286	100.00		36,199	100.00		
Registered voters/turnout	82,195	44.15		82,195	44.04		

== May 2011 election ==
The following table shows the results of the 2011 election.

Party	Ward			List			Total seats
Party	Votes	%	Seats	Votes	%	Seats	Total seats
African National Congress	29,086	67.23	21	29,784	67.87	13	34
Democratic Alliance	9,653	22.31	4	9,684	22.07	7	11
Congress of the People	2,402	5.55	0	2,814	6.41	3	3
Freedom Front Plus	1,060	2.45	0	700	1.60	1	1
African People's Convention	365	0.84	0	371	0.85	1	1
African Christian Democratic Party	270	0.62	0	255	0.58	0	0
Azanian People's Organisation	220	0.51	0	276	0.63	0	0
Independent candidates	208	0.48	0				0
Total	43,264	100.00	25	43,884	100.00	25	50
Valid votes	43,264	97.60		43,884	98.28		
Invalid/blank votes	1,065	2.40		769	1.72		
Total votes	44,329	100.00		44,653	100.00		
Registered voters/turnout	81,617	54.31		81,617	54.71		

== August 2016 election ==
The following table shows the results of the 2016 election.

Party	Ward			List			Total seats
Party	Votes	%	Seats	Votes	%	Seats	Total seats
African National Congress	25,188	60.28	20	25,084	59.93	7	27
Democratic Alliance	10,350	24.77	3	10,397	24.84	8	11
Economic Freedom Fighters	3,301	7.90	0	3,451	8.24	4	4
Freedom Front Plus	1,462	3.50	0	1,369	3.27	2	2
Congress of the People	882	2.11	0	819	1.96	1	1
African People's Convention	127	0.30	0	232	0.55	0	0
African Christian Democratic Party	170	0.41	0	175	0.42	0	0
Pan Africanist Congress of Azania	171	0.41	0	155	0.37	0	0
Azanian People's Organisation	108	0.26	0	175	0.42	0	0
Independent candidates	25	0.06	0				0
Total	41,784	100.00	23	41,857	100.00	22	45
Valid votes	41,784	98.43		41,857	98.34		
Invalid/blank votes	666	1.57		705	1.66		
Total votes	42,450	100.00		42,562	100.00		
Registered voters/turnout	81,069	52.36		81,069	52.50		

== November 2021 election ==
The following table shows the results of the 2021 election.

Party	Ward			List			Total seats
Party	Votes	%	Seats	Votes	%	Seats	Total seats
African National Congress	15,703	49.93	19	15,477	49.17	3	22
Democratic Alliance	6,669	21.21	3	6,669	21.19	7	10
Economic Freedom Fighters	3,553	11.30	0	3,705	11.77	5	5
Moqhaka Community Forum	1,797	5.71	0	2,231	7.09	3	3
Freedom Front Plus	1,863	5.92	0	1,957	6.22	3	3
Power of Africans Unity	502	1.60	0	481	1.53	1	1
Independent candidates	629	2.00	0				0
Congress of the People	297	0.94	0	310	0.98	0	0
African Christian Democratic Party	148	0.47	0	277	0.88	0	0
Independent South African National Civic Organisation	95	0.30	0	109	0.35	0	0
African Transformation Movement	83	0.26	0	109	0.35	0	0
Inkatha Freedom Party	12	0.04	0	113	0.36	0	0
Azanian People's Organisation	90	0.29	0				0
Forum for Service Delivery	9	0.03	0	41	0.13	0	0
Total	31,450	100.00	22	31,479	100.00	22	44
Valid votes	31,450	97.96		31,479	98.05		
Invalid/blank votes	654	2.04		625	1.95		
Total votes	32,104	100.00		32,104	100.00		
Registered voters/turnout	76,378	42.03		76,378	42.03		

== November 2026 election ==
The following table shows the results of the 2026 election.

Party	Ward			List			Total seats
Party	Votes	%	Seats	Votes	%	Seats	Total seats
African National Congress	13,200	35.39	15	13,306	35.84	0	15
Democratic Alliance	12,188	32.67	5	12,176	32.79	8	13
Economic Freedom Fighters	3,289	8.82	0	3,365	9.06	4	4
Freedom Front Plus	2,655	7.12	0	2,721	7.33	3	3
United Development Forum	1,228	3.29	0	1,207	3.25	1	1
Moqhaka Community Forum	614	1.65	0	893	2.41	1	1
African Congress for Transformation	700	1.88	0	692	1.86	1	1
ActionSA	639	1.71	0	708	1.91	1	1
South African Communist Party	311	0.83	0	415	1.12	1	1
African Independent Congress	393	1.05	0	225	0.61	0	0
Azanian People's Organisation	304	0.81	0	229	0.62	0	0
uMkhonto weSizwe Party	526	1.41	0				0
Afrika Mayibuye Movement	214	0.57	0	197	0.53	0	0
Patriotic Alliance	164	0.44	0	231	0.62	0	0
African Transformation Movement	108	0.29	0	225	0.61	0	0
Independent candidates	293	0.79	0				0
African Christian Democratic Party	94	0.25	0	165	0.44	0	0
Pan Africanist Congress of Azania	135	0.36	0	117	0.32	0	0
Fezile Dabi Civic Movement	95	0.25	0	90	0.24	0	0
Economic Emancipation Forum	75	0.20	0	48	0.13	0	0
African Liberation Movement	57	0.15	0	47	0.13	0	0
Inkatha Freedom Party	19	0.05	0	71	0.19	0	0
Total	37,301	100.00	20	37,128	100.00	20	40
Valid votes	37,301	97.47		37,128	97.41		
Invalid/blank votes	969	2.53		987	2.59		
Total votes	38,270	100.00		38,115	100.00		
Registered voters/turnout	81,781	46.80		81,781	46.61		
