= Amahlathi Local Municipality elections =

Local elections in the Eastern Cape, South Africa

The Amahlathi Local Municipality council (within the South African Amathole District Municipality) consists of twenty-seven members elected by mixed-member proportional representation. Fourteen councillors are elected by first-past-the-post voting in fourteen wards, while the remaining thirteen are chosen from party lists so that the total number of party representatives is proportional to the number of votes received.

In the election of 4 November 2026 the African National Congress (ANC) won a majority of eighteen seats.

== Results ==
The following table shows the composition of the council after past elections.

Event	ANC	DA	EFF	UDM	Other	Total
2000 election	35	3	—	1	—	39
2006 election	36	2	—	1	1	40
2011 election	33	2	—	1	4	40
2016 election	24	3	3	0	0	30
2021 election	23	3	2	0	2	30
2026 election	18	3	2	—	4	27

== December 2000 election ==
The following table shows the results of the 2000 election.

Party	Ward			List			Total seats
Party	Votes	%	Seats	Votes	%	Seats	Total seats
African National Congress	32,372	89.72	20	31,989	88.91	15	35
Democratic Alliance	2,740	7.59	0	2,462	6.84	3	3
United Democratic Movement	968	2.68	0	1,529	4.25	1	1
Total	36,080	100.00	20	35,980	100.00	19	39
Valid votes	36,080	97.07		35,980	96.61		
Invalid/blank votes	1,090	2.93		1,261	3.39		
Total votes	37,170	100.00		37,241	100.00		
Registered voters/turnout	61,657	60.29		61,657	60.40		

== March 2006 election ==
The following table shows the results of the 2006 election.

Party	Ward			List			Total seats
Party	Votes	%	Seats	Votes	%	Seats	Total seats
African National Congress	34,562	90.57	20	34,537	90.14	16	36
Democratic Alliance	1,862	4.88	0	1,670	4.36	2	2
United Democratic Movement	874	2.29	0	1,262	3.29	1	1
Pan Africanist Congress of Azania	561	1.47	0	606	1.58	1	1
Independent Democrats	241	0.63	0	240	0.63	0	0
Independent candidates	61	0.16	0				0
Total	38,161	100.00	20	38,315	100.00	20	40
Valid votes	38,161	97.75		38,315	98.10		
Invalid/blank votes	880	2.25		741	1.90		
Total votes	39,041	100.00		39,056	100.00		
Registered voters/turnout	66,240	58.94		66,240	58.96		

== May 2011 election ==
The following table shows the results of the 2011 election.

Party	Ward			List			Total seats
Party	Votes	%	Seats	Votes	%	Seats	Total seats
African National Congress	29,355	80.18	20	29,829	82.38	13	33
Congress of the People	2,743	7.49	0	2,936	8.11	3	3
Democratic Alliance	1,935	5.29	0	1,802	4.98	2	2
Cathcart Residents Association	689	1.88	0	656	1.81	1	1
Independent candidates	1,082	2.96	0				0
United Democratic Movement	343	0.94	0	423	1.17	1	1
Pan Africanist Congress of Azania	374	1.02	0	169	0.47	0	0
African People's Convention	43	0.12	0	292	0.81	0	0
Azanian People's Organisation	47	0.13	0	103	0.28	0	0
Total	36,611	100.00	20	36,210	100.00	20	40
Valid votes	36,611	98.19		36,210	98.08		
Invalid/blank votes	674	1.81		709	1.92		
Total votes	37,285	100.00		36,919	100.00		
Registered voters/turnout	63,773	58.47		63,773	57.89		

== August 2016 election ==
The following table shows the results of the 2016 election.

Party	Ward			List			Total seats
Party	Votes	%	Seats	Votes	%	Seats	Total seats
African National Congress	21,457	75.95	15	21,833	79.29	9	24
Democratic Alliance	2,395	8.48	0	2,462	8.94	3	3
Economic Freedom Fighters	2,249	7.96	0	2,326	8.45	3	3
Independent candidates	1,537	5.44	0				0
Congress of the People	304	1.08	0	365	1.33	0	0
United Residents Front	174	0.62	0	177	0.64	0	0
United Democratic Movement				186	0.68	0	0
Pan Africanist Congress of Azania	76	0.27	0	68	0.25	0	0
Pan Africanist Movement	48	0.17	0	75	0.27	0	0
Peoples Alliance	13	0.05	0	42	0.15	0	0
Total	28,253	100.00	15	27,534	100.00	15	30
Valid votes	28,253	98.16		27,534	96.64		
Invalid/blank votes	529	1.84		957	3.36		
Total votes	28,782	100.00		28,491	100.00		
Registered voters/turnout	52,945	54.36		52,945	53.81		

== November 2021 election ==
The following table shows the results of the 2021 election.

Party	Ward			List			Total seats
Party	Votes	%	Seats	Votes	%	Seats	Total seats
African National Congress	16,049	70.14	14	17,236	76.00	9	23
Democratic Alliance	2,110	9.22	0	2,264	9.98	3	3
Economic Freedom Fighters	1,431	6.25	0	1,660	7.32	2	2
Independent candidates	2,478	10.83	1				1
African People's Convention	369	1.61	0	305	1.34	1	1
Independent South African National Civic Organisation	84	0.37	0	301	1.33	0	0
African Transformation Movement	146	0.64	0	236	1.04	0	0
African Independent Congress	30	0.13	0	351	1.55	0	0
Pan Africanist Congress of Azania	55	0.24	0	90	0.40	0	0
Congress of the People	59	0.26	0	65	0.29	0	0
United Independent Movement	65	0.28	0	57	0.25	0	0
Inkatha Freedom Party	2	0.01	0	81	0.36	0	0
National Freedom Party	2	0.01	0	34	0.15	0	0
Total	22,880	100.00	15	22,680	100.00	15	30
Valid votes	22,880	97.79		22,680	97.04		
Invalid/blank votes	516	2.21		691	2.96		
Total votes	23,396	100.00		23,371	100.00		
Registered voters/turnout	49,510	47.26		49,510	47.20		

=== By-elections from November 2021 ===
The following by-elections were held to fill vacant ward seats in the period from November 2021.

Date	Ward	Party of the previous councillor	Party of the newly elected councillor
17 July 2024	1	Independent candidate	African National Congress
17 July 2024	11	African National Congress	African National Congress

== November 2026 election ==
The following table shows the results of the 2026 election.

Party	Ward			List			Total seats
Party	Votes	%	Seats	Votes	%	Seats	Total seats
African National Congress	15,866	64.54	14	15,903	64.80	4	18
Democratic Alliance	2,355	9.58	0	2,305	9.39	3	3
South African Communist Party	2,311	9.40	0	2,210	9.00	2	2
Economic Freedom Fighters	1,768	7.19	0	1,693	6.90	2	2
African Transformation Movement	922	3.75	0	944	3.85	1	1
uMkhonto weSizwe Party	409	1.66	0	716	2.92	1	1
Pan Africanist Congress of Azania	224	0.91	0	193	0.79	0	0
Afrika Mayibuye Movement	207	0.84	0	208	0.85	0	0
African People's Convention	150	0.61	0	168	0.68	0	0
Independent candidates	251	1.02	0				0
African Movement Congress	45	0.18	0	81	0.33	0	0
Al Jama-ah	72	0.29	0	53	0.22	0	0
Patriotic Alliance				45	0.18	0	0
Inkatha Freedom Party	3	0.01	0	23	0.09	0	0
Total	24,583	100.00	14	24,542	100.00	13	27
Valid votes	24,583	98.32		24,542	98.23		
Invalid/blank votes	419	1.68		441	1.77		
Total votes	25,002	100.00		24,983	100.00		
Registered voters/turnout	50,308	49.70		50,308	49.66		
