= Matjhabeng Local Municipality elections =

Local elections in the Free State, South Africa

The Matjhabeng Local Municipality council consists of seventy-two members elected by mixed-member proportional representation. Thirty-six councillors are elected by first-past-the-post voting in thirty-six wards, while the remaining thirty-six are chosen from party lists so that the total number of party representatives is proportional to the number of votes received.

In the election of 4 November 2026, no party won a majority. The African National Congress (ANC) won the largest number of seats in the council.

== Results ==
The following table shows the composition of the council after past elections.

Event	ANC	ATM	COPE	DA	EFF	FF+	PAC	Other	Total
2000 election	56	—	—	14	—	—	1	1	72
2006 election	57	—	—	11	—	1	1	2	72
2011 election	52	—	3	16	—	1	0	1	72
2016 election	46	—	1	16	6	1	—	2	72
2021 election	39	1	1	16	9	2	—	4	72
2026 election	26	1	0	24	5	3	0	13	72

== December 2000 election ==
The following table shows the results of the 2000 election.

Party	Ward			List			Total seats
Party	Votes	%	Seats	Votes	%	Seats	Total seats
African National Congress	67,207	76.84	30	67,970	77.45	26	56
Democratic Alliance	17,478	19.98	6	15,921	18.14	8	14
Pan Africanist Congress of Azania	724	0.83	0	1,222	1.39	1	1
United Democratic Movement	393	0.45	0	991	1.13	1	1
Azanian People's Organisation	374	0.43	0	711	0.81	0	0
Independent candidates	866	0.99	0				0
Inkatha Freedom Party	271	0.31	0	487	0.55	0	0
Alliance 2000+	149	0.17	0	459	0.52	0	0
Total	87,462	100.00	36	87,761	100.00	36	72
Valid votes	87,462	97.75		87,761	98.00		
Invalid/blank votes	2,016	2.25		1,789	2.00		
Total votes	89,478	100.00		89,550	100.00		
Registered voters/turnout	198,461	45.09		198,461	45.12		

== March 2006 election ==
The following table shows the results of the 2006 election.

Party	Ward			List			Total seats
Party	Votes	%	Seats	Votes	%	Seats	Total seats
African National Congress	70,338	77.69	31	72,212	79.81	26	57
Democratic Alliance	13,872	15.32	4	13,430	14.84	7	11
Independent candidates	2,716	3.00	1				1
Pan Africanist Congress of Azania	1,434	1.58	0	1,218	1.35	1	1
Freedom Front Plus	965	1.07	0	992	1.10	1	1
African Christian Democratic Party	666	0.74	0	876	0.97	1	1
Independent Civic Organisation of South Africa	526	0.58	0	394	0.44	0	0
United Democratic Movement				760	0.84	0	0
Independent Democrats	20	0.02	0	599	0.66	0	0
Total	90,537	100.00	36	90,481	100.00	36	72
Valid votes	90,537	97.96		90,481	97.68		
Invalid/blank votes	1,881	2.04		2,148	2.32		
Total votes	92,418	100.00		92,629	100.00		
Registered voters/turnout	200,816	46.02		200,816	46.13		

== May 2011 election ==
The following table shows the results of the 2011 election.

Party	Ward			List			Total seats
Party	Votes	%	Seats	Votes	%	Seats	Total seats
African National Congress	77,277	70.69	30	79,583	72.49	22	52
Democratic Alliance	23,459	21.46	6	22,989	20.94	10	16
Congress of the People	4,214	3.85	0	4,974	4.53	3	3
Independent candidates	2,101	1.92	0				0
Freedom Front Plus	829	0.76	0	696	0.63	1	1
African Christian Democratic Party	438	0.40	0	326	0.30	0	0
African People's Convention	160	0.15	0	437	0.40	0	0
Dikwankwetla Party of South Africa	323	0.30	0	268	0.24	0	0
Pan Africanist Congress of Azania	282	0.26	0	284	0.26	0	0
Independent Civic Organisation of South Africa	186	0.17	0	189	0.17	0	0
United Residents Front	49	0.04	0	43	0.04	0	0
Total	109,318	100.00	36	109,789	100.00	36	72
Valid votes	109,318	98.32		109,789	98.68		
Invalid/blank votes	1,867	1.68		1,471	1.32		
Total votes	111,185	100.00		111,260	100.00		
Registered voters/turnout	203,594	54.61		203,594	54.65		

== August 2016 election ==
The following table shows the results of the 2016 election.

Party	Ward			List			Total seats
Party	Votes	%	Seats	Votes	%	Seats	Total seats
African National Congress	68,925	61.47	29	69,781	62.86	17	46
Democratic Alliance	24,106	21.50	6	24,623	22.18	10	16
Economic Freedom Fighters	9,138	8.15	0	9,738	8.77	6	6
Independent candidates	5,947	5.30	1				1
Freedom Front Plus	1,858	1.66	0	1,828	1.65	1	1
Congress of the People	1,510	1.35	0	1,198	1.08	1	1
United Front of Civics				2,708	2.44	1	1
African People's Convention	207	0.18	0	509	0.46	0	0
African Christian Democratic Party	273	0.24	0	308	0.28	0	0
Independent Civic Organisation of South Africa	159	0.14	0	310	0.28	0	0
Total	112,123	100.00	36	111,003	100.00	36	72
Valid votes	112,123	98.34		111,003	98.25		
Invalid/blank votes	1,894	1.66		1,972	1.75		
Total votes	114,017	100.00		112,975	100.00		
Registered voters/turnout	207,975	54.82		207,975	54.32		

== November 2021 election ==
The following table shows the results of the 2021 election.

Party	Ward			List			Total seats
Party	Votes	%	Seats	Votes	%	Seats	Total seats
African National Congress	46,035	53.08	28	46,605	53.88	11	39
Democratic Alliance	18,785	21.66	8	18,869	21.82	8	16
Economic Freedom Fighters	9,906	11.42	0	10,093	11.67	9	9
Freedom Front Plus	2,720	3.14	0	2,614	3.02	2	2
African Democratic Change	2,113	2.44	0	2,154	2.49	2	2
Independent South African National Civic Organisation	1,801	2.08	0	1,770	2.05	2	2
Independent candidates	2,078	2.40	0				0
African Transformation Movement	729	0.84	0	705	0.82	1	1
Congress of the People	424	0.49	0	693	0.80	1	1
Patriotic Alliance	422	0.49	0	515	0.60	0	0
African Christian Democratic Party	454	0.52	0	459	0.53	0	0
African People's Convention	433	0.50	0	256	0.30	0	0
African Content Movement				560	0.65	0	0
Forum for Service Delivery	249	0.29	0	271	0.31	0	0
Patriotic Front of Azania	215	0.25	0	187	0.22	0	0
Inkatha Freedom Party	82	0.09	0	287	0.33	0	0
Independent Civic Organisation of South Africa	87	0.10	0	204	0.24	0	0
Power of Africans Unity	102	0.12	0	124	0.14	0	0
Agency for New Agenda	85	0.10	0	126	0.15	0	0
Total	86,720	100.00	36	86,492	100.00	36	72
Valid votes	86,720	98.57		86,492	98.57		
Invalid/blank votes	1,259	1.43		1,259	1.43		
Total votes	87,979	100.00		87,751	100.00		
Registered voters/turnout	197,853	44.47		197,853	44.35		

=== By-elections from November 2021 ===
The following by-elections were held to fill vacant ward seats in the period from November 2021.

Date	Ward	Party of the previous councillor	Party of the newly elected councillor
11 Sep 2024	35	Democratic Alliance	Democratic Alliance

== November 2026 election ==
The following table shows the results of the 2026 election.

Party	Ward			List			Total seats
Party	Votes	%	Seats	Votes	%	Seats	Total seats
African National Congress	36,664	35.67	23	36,589	35.41	3	26
Democratic Alliance	33,920	33.00	13	34,581	33.46	11	24
Economic Freedom Fighters	7,144	6.95	0	7,466	7.22	5	5
South African Communist Party	4,482	4.36	0	4,005	3.88	3	3
Freedom Front Plus	3,986	3.88	0	4,380	4.24	3	3
Patriotic Alliance	2,951	2.87	0	2,936	2.84	2	2
Voice for Change	2,296	2.23	0	2,931	2.84	2	2
ActionSA	2,059	2.00	0	2,334	2.26	2	2
African Congress for Transformation	2,105	2.05	0	2,084	2.02	2	2
African Transformation Movement	1,362	1.33	0	1,480	1.43	1	1
United Residents Front	932	0.91	0	617	0.60	1	1
Inkatha Freedom Party	608	0.59	0	553	0.54	1	1
uMkhonto weSizwe Party	1,144	1.11	0				0
Labour Party	576	0.56	0	523	0.51	0	0
Afrika Mayibuye Movement	441	0.43	0	470	0.45	0	0
African Christian Democratic Party	353	0.34	0	367	0.36	0	0
African Independent Congress	309	0.30	0	301	0.29	0	0
Congress of the People	280	0.27	0	270	0.26	0	0
Pan Africanist Congress of Azania	203	0.20	0	215	0.21	0	0
African People's Convention	171	0.17	0	128	0.12	0	0
African Liberation Movement	141	0.14	0	138	0.13	0	0
United Africans Transformation	72	0.07	0	199	0.19	0	0
African Alliance Congress	106	0.10	0	146	0.14	0	0
Freedom in South Africa	101	0.10	0	92	0.09	0	0
Bana Ba Mobu	63	0.06	0	102	0.10	0	0
Truth and Solidarity Movement	77	0.07	0	77	0.07	0	0
Economic Emancipation Forum	84	0.08	0	65	0.06	0	0
African Movement Congress	23	0.02	0	87	0.08	0	0
Independent Civic Organisation of South Africa	44	0.04	0	63	0.06	0	0
All Citizens Party	19	0.02	0	74	0.07	0	0
African Renaissance Unity	14	0.01	0	65	0.06	0	0
Independent candidates	45	0.04	0				0
United Independent Movement	8	0.01	0				0
Total	102,783	100.00	36	103,338	100.00	36	72
Valid votes	102,783	98.31		103,338	98.37		
Invalid/blank votes	1,771	1.69		1,711	1.63		
Total votes	104,554	100.00		105,049	100.00		
Registered voters/turnout	206,480	50.64		206,480	50.88		
