= Buffalo City elections =

Local elections in the Eastern Cape, South Africa

The Buffalo City Metropolitan Municipality council consists of one hundred members elected by mixed-member proportional representation. Fifty councillors are elected by first-past-the-post voting in fifty wards, while the remaining fifty are chosen from party lists so that the total number of party representatives is proportional to the number of votes received. In the election of 1 November 2021 the African National Congress (ANC) won a majority of seats on the council.

== Results ==
The following table shows the composition of the council after past elections.

Event	ACDP	AIC	ANC	COPE	DA	EFF	PAC	UDM	Other	Total
2000 election	1	—	73	—	12	—	2	1	0	89
2006 election	1	—	73	—	11	—	3	1	0	89
2011 election	1	2	71	3	21	—	2	0	0	100
2016 election	1	4	60	1	24	8	1	1	0	100
2021 election	1	1	61	0	20	13	1	1	2	100
2026 election	0	1	42	0	17	7	1	19	13	100

== December 2000 election ==
The following table shows the results of the 2000 election.

Buffalo City local election, 5 December 2000
Party	Votes				Seats		
Party	Ward	List	Total	%	Ward	List	Total
African National Congress	154,360	157,746	312,106	80.4%	41	32	73
Democratic Alliance	24,440	25,723	50,163	12.9%	4	8	12
Pan Africanist Congress of Azania	4,089	4,942	9,031	2.3%	0	2	2
Independent candidates	7,330	–	7,330	1.9%	0	–	0
African Christian Democratic Party	3,379	2,205	5,584	1.4%	0	1	1
United Democratic Movement	426	2,931	3,357	0.9%	0	1	1
Inkatha Freedom Party	258	561	819	0.2%	0	0	0
Total	194,282	194,108	388,390		45	44	89
Valid votes	194,282	194,108	388,390	98.0%			
Spoilt votes	3,658	4,073	7,731	2.0%			
Total votes cast	197,940	198,181	396,121				
Voter turnout	199,243						
Registered voters	341,665						
Turnout percentage	58.3%						

== March 2006 election ==
The following table shows the results of the 2006 election.

Buffalo City local election, 1 March 2006
Party	Votes				Seats		
Party	Ward	List	Total	%	Ward	List	Total
African National Congress	149,889	150,121	300,010	81.3%	41	32	73
Democratic Alliance	23,124	22,024	45,148	12.2%	4	7	11
Pan Africanist Congress of Azania	6,190	5,496	11,686	3.2%	0	3	3
African Christian Democratic Party	2,309	2,019	4,328	1.2%	0	1	1
United Democratic Movement	287	2,553	2,840	0.8%	0	1	1
Independent Democrats	582	1,216	1,798	0.5%	0	0	0
Independent candidates	1,664	–	1,664	0.5%	0	–	0
United Independent Front	415	551	966	0.3%	0	0	0
National Democratic Convention	61	359	420	0.1%	0	0	0
Inkatha Freedom Party	29	234	263	0.1%	0	0	0
Total	184,550	184,573	369,123		45	44	89
Valid votes	184,550	184,573	369,123	98.4%			
Spoilt votes	3,223	2,761	5,984	1.6%			
Total votes cast	187,773	187,334	375,107				
Voter turnout	189,083						
Registered voters	358,460						
Turnout percentage	52.7%						

== May 2011 election ==
The following table shows the results of the 2011 election.

Buffalo City local election, 18 May 2011
Party	Votes				Seats		
Party	Ward	List	Total	%	Ward	List	Total
African National Congress	150,914	146,919	297,833	70.0%	43	28	71
Democratic Alliance	44,083	43,062	87,145	20.5%	7	14	21
Congress of the People	4,296	7,867	12,163	2.9%	0	3	3
Pan Africanist Congress of Azania	4,493	3,536	8,029	1.9%	0	2	2
African Independent Congress	355	7,616	7,971	1.9%	0	2	2
Independent candidates	5,668	–	5,668	1.3%	0	–	0
African Christian Democratic Party	1,687	1,485	3,172	0.7%	0	1	1
United Democratic Movement	1,130	1,563	2,693	0.6%	0	0	0
Pan Africanist Movement	279	492	771	0.2%	0	0	0
Total	212,905	212,540	425,445		50	50	100
Valid votes	212,905	212,540	425,445	98.3%			
Spoilt votes	3,408	4,016	7,424	1.7%			
Total votes cast	216,313	216,556	432,869				
Voter turnout	218,108						
Registered voters	384,910						
Turnout percentage	56.7%						

== August 2016 election ==
The following table shows the results of the 2016 election.

Buffalo City local election, 3 August 2016
Party	Votes				Seats		
Party	Ward	List	Total	%	Ward	List	Total
African National Congress	131,698	136,354	268,052	58.7%	45	15	60
Democratic Alliance	53,374	53,416	106,790	23.4%	5	19	24
Economic Freedom Fighters	17,697	18,693	36,390	8.0%	0	8	8
African Independent Congress	6,731	8,869	15,600	3.4%	0	4	4
Independent candidates	12,255	–	12,255	2.7%	0	–	0
Pan Africanist Congress of Azania	1,877	2,228	4,105	0.9%	0	1	1
United Democratic Movement	1,021	2,944	3,965	0.9%	0	1	1
Congress of the People	1,655	2,258	3,913	0.9%	0	1	1
African Christian Democratic Party	1,275	1,244	2,519	0.6%	0	1	1
United Front of the Eastern Cape	623	730	1,353	0.3%	0	0	0
Pan Africanist Movement	88	446	534	0.1%	0	0	0
United Congress	204	224	428	0.1%	0	0	0
Peoples Alliance	40	366	406	0.1%	0	0	0
Total	228,538	227,772	456,310		50	50	100
Valid votes	228,538	227,772	456,310	97.7%			
Spoilt votes	4,934	5,843	10,777	2.3%			
Total votes cast	233,472	233,615	467,087				
Voter turnout	235,369						
Registered voters	419,044						
Turnout percentage	56.2%						

== November 2021 election ==
The following table shows the results of the 2021 election.

Buffalo City local election, 1 November 2021
Party	Votes				Seats		
Party	Ward	List	Total	%	Ward	List	Total
African National Congress	105,038	109,080	214,118	59.4%	43	18	61
Democratic Alliance	35,195	35,139	70,334	19.5%	7	13	20
Economic Freedom Fighters	21,165	22,301	43,466	12.1%	0	13	13
Independent candidates	8,383	–	8,383	2.3%	0	–	0
United Democratic Movement	1,476	1,990	3,466	1.0%	0	1	1
Pan Africanist Congress of Azania	1,499	1,884	3,383	0.9%	0	1	1
African Transformation Movement	1,667	1,603	3,270	0.9%	0	1	1
African Independent Congress	806	1,756	2,562	0.7%	0	1	1
African Christian Democratic Party	991	1,020	2,011	0.6%	0	1	1
Freedom Front Plus	914	934	1,848	0.5%	0	1	1
Patriotic Alliance	351	764	1,115	0.3%	0	0	0
Independent South African National Civic Organisation	187	608	795	0.2%	0	0	0
African Multicultural Economic Congress	273	477	750	0.2%	0	0	0
United Independent Movement	334	414	748	0.2%	0	0	0
Good	356	331	687	0.2%	0	0	0
Congress of the People	86	487	573	0.2%	0	0	0
African People's Convention	318	208	526	0.1%	0	0	0
Progressive Community Movement	264	229	493	0.1%	0	0	0
Batho Pele Movement	247	182	429	0.1%	0	0	0
National Freedom Party	94	285	379	0.1%	0	0	0
Africa Restoration Alliance	141	80	221	0.1%	0	0	0
Al Jama-ah	114	100	214	0.1%	0	0	0
The Organic Humanity Movement	85	80	165	0.0%	0	0	0
God Save Africa	–	108	108	0.0%	–	0	0
Abantu Batho Congress	8	89	97	0.0%	0	0	0
Civic Independent	17	73	90	0.0%	0	0	0
Arusha Economic Coalition	8	43	51	0.0%	0	0	0
Cape Coloured Congress	12	–	12	0.0%	0	–	0
Total	180,029	180,265	360,294		50	50	100
Valid votes	180,029	180,265	360,294	98.2%			
Spoilt votes	2,937	3,571	6,508	1.8%			
Total votes cast	182,966	183,836	366,802				
Voter turnout	185,525						
Registered voters	406,486						
Turnout percentage	45.6%						

=== By-elections from November 2021 ===
The following by-elections were held to fill vacant ward seats in the period since the election in November 2021.

Date	Ward	Party of the previous councillor	Party of the newly elected councillor
9 Oct 2024	12	African National Congress	African National Congress
9 Oct 2024	15	African National Congress	African National Congress
18 Mar 2026	32	African National Congress	African National Congress
17 Jun 2026	1	African National Congress	African National Congress
17 Jun 2026	10	African National Congress	African National Congress

== November 2026 election ==
The following table shows the results of the 2026 election.

Party	Ward			List			Total seats
Party	Votes	%	Seats	Votes	%	Seats	Total seats
African National Congress	104,916	42.18	38	103,657	41.69	4	42
United Democratic Movement	40,645	16.34	3	50,818	20.44	16	19
Democratic Alliance	42,917	17.25	6	40,907	16.45	11	17
Economic Freedom Fighters	17,668	7.10	2	16,082	6.47	5	7
South African Communist Party	11,856	4.77	1	10,268	4.13	4	5
African Transformation Movement	5,363	2.16	0	4,795	1.93	2	2
Patriotic Alliance	4,299	1.73	0	4,124	1.66	2	2
ActionSA	4,387	1.76	0	3,742	1.50	2	2
Freedom Front Plus	3,142	1.26	0	3,333	1.34	1	1
uMkhonto weSizwe Party	2,877	1.16	0	1,676	0.67	1	1
Pan Africanist Congress of Azania	1,745	0.70	0	1,502	0.60	1	1
African Independent Congress	1,535	0.62	0	1,244	0.50	1	1
Thina Bantu Movement	994	0.40	0	1,002	0.40	0	0
African Christian Democratic Party	971	0.39	0	1,009	0.41	0	0
Rise Mzansi	874	0.35	0	847	0.34	0	0
Social Democratic Movement	1,005	0.40	0	660	0.27	0	0
African Heart Congress	672	0.27	0	647	0.26	0	0
Al Jama-ah	467	0.19	0	377	0.15	0	0
African Unemployed Congress	332	0.13	0	276	0.11	0	0
African People's Convention	349	0.14	0	251	0.10	0	0
Congress of the People	355	0.14	0	200	0.08	0	0
Afrika Mayibuye Movement	250	0.10	0	200	0.08	0	0
Independent candidates	421	0.17	0				0
One Love Alliance	222	0.09	0	186	0.07	0	0
Progressive Community Movement	203	0.08	0	173	0.07	0	0
Inkatha Freedom Party	45	0.02	0	287	0.12	0	0
African Congress for Transformation	23	0.01	0	160	0.06	0	0
African Movement Congress	17	0.01	0	148	0.06	0	0
Service Delivery Party	95	0.04	0	40	0.02	0	0
Arusha Economic Coalition	81	0.03	0	49	0.02	0	0
Total	248,726	100.00	50	248,660	100.00	50	100
Valid votes	248,726	98.02		248,660	98.16		
Invalid/blank votes	5,026	1.98		4,665	1.84		
Total votes	253,752	100.00		253,325	100.00		
Registered voters/turnout	458,695	55.32		458,695	55.23		
