= Dr AB Xuma Local Municipality elections =

Local elections in the Eastern Cape, South Africa

The Dr AB Xuma Local Municipality (previously Engcobo Local Municipality) council consists of thirty-eight members elected by mixed-member proportional representation. Nineteen councillors are elected by first-past-the-post voting in nineteen wards, while the remaining nineteen are chosen from party lists so that the total number of party representatives is proportional to the number of votes received.

In the election of 4 November 2026 the African National Congress (ANC) won a reduced majority of twenty-four seats.

== Results ==
The following table shows the composition of the council after past elections.

Event	AIC	ANC	ATM	DA	EFF	PAC	UDM	Other	Total
2000 election	—	19	—	—	—	2	8	0	29
2006 election	—	26	—	—	—	2	3	0	31
2011 election	—	35	—	0	—	1	3	1	40
2016 election	1	33	—	1	2	0	2	0	39
2021 election	—	32	1	1	2	1	2	0	39
2026 election	1	24	7	1	1	1	—	3	38

== December 2000 election ==
The following table shows the results of the 2000 election.

Party	Ward			List			Total seats
Party	Votes	%	Seats	Votes	%	Seats	Total seats
African National Congress	14,977	64.33	14	15,063	64.99	5	19
United Democratic Movement	5,996	25.75	1	6,187	26.69	7	8
Pan Africanist Congress of Azania	1,927	8.28	0	1,927	8.31	2	2
Independent candidates	381	1.64	0				0
Total	23,281	100.00	15	23,177	100.00	14	29
Valid votes	23,281	97.34		23,177	96.89		
Invalid/blank votes	637	2.66		743	3.11		
Total votes	23,918	100.00		23,920	100.00		
Registered voters/turnout	47,665	50.18		47,665	50.18		

== March 2006 election ==
The following table shows the results of the 2006 election.

Party	Ward			List			Total seats
Party	Votes	%	Seats	Votes	%	Seats	Total seats
African National Congress	27,542	81.75	16	28,081	83.77	10	26
United Democratic Movement	2,832	8.41	0	3,234	9.65	3	3
Pan Africanist Congress of Azania	1,961	5.82	0	1,747	5.21	2	2
Independent candidates	981	2.91	0				0
United Independent Front	375	1.11	0	460	1.37	0	0
Total	33,691	100.00	16	33,522	100.00	15	31
Valid votes	33,691	97.28		33,522	96.92		
Invalid/blank votes	941	2.72		1,067	3.08		
Total votes	34,632	100.00		34,589	100.00		
Registered voters/turnout	59,915	57.80		59,915	57.73		

== May 2011 election ==
The following table shows the results of the 2011 election.

Party	Ward			List			Total seats
Party	Votes	%	Seats	Votes	%	Seats	Total seats
African National Congress	32,542	87.55	20	32,646	86.98	15	35
United Democratic Movement	2,848	7.66	0	2,494	6.64	3	3
Pan Africanist Congress of Azania	798	2.15	0	476	1.27	1	1
National Freedom Party	420	1.13	0	540	1.44	1	1
Congress of the People	91	0.24	0	784	2.09	0	0
Pan Africanist Movement	363	0.98	0	182	0.48	0	0
Democratic Alliance	48	0.13	0	265	0.71	0	0
United Independent Front	30	0.08	0	74	0.20	0	0
Inkatha Freedom Party	30	0.08	0	73	0.19	0	0
Total	37,170	100.00	20	37,534	100.00	20	40
Valid votes	37,170	98.06		37,534	98.40		
Invalid/blank votes	734	1.94		610	1.60		
Total votes	37,904	100.00		38,144	100.00		
Registered voters/turnout	69,485	54.55		69,485	54.90		

== August 2016 election ==
The following table shows the results of the 2016 election.

Party	Ward			List			Total seats
Party	Votes	%	Seats	Votes	%	Seats	Total seats
African National Congress	31,044	83.32	20	30,492	83.28	13	33
United Democratic Movement	2,199	5.90	0	2,254	6.16	2	2
Economic Freedom Fighters	1,331	3.57	0	1,545	4.22	2	2
Democratic Alliance	760	2.04	0	646	1.76	1	1
Independent candidates	877	2.35	0				0
African Independent Congress	317	0.85	0	476	1.30	1	1
United Front of the Eastern Cape	154	0.41	0	550	1.50	0	0
Pan Africanist Congress of Azania	296	0.79	0	222	0.61	0	0
African People's Convention	226	0.61	0	268	0.73	0	0
Pan Africanist Movement	56	0.15	0	160	0.44	0	0
Total	37,260	100.00	20	36,613	100.00	19	39
Valid votes	37,260	97.95		36,613	97.63		
Invalid/blank votes	781	2.05		888	2.37		
Total votes	38,041	100.00		37,501	100.00		
Registered voters/turnout	73,494	51.76		73,494	51.03		

== November 2021 election ==
The following table shows the results of the 2021 election.

Party	Ward			List			Total seats
Party	Votes	%	Seats	Votes	%	Seats	Total seats
African National Congress	26,473	81.92	20	26,445	82.07	12	32
Economic Freedom Fighters	1,774	5.49	0	1,804	5.60	2	2
United Democratic Movement	1,643	5.08	0	1,635	5.07	2	2
African Transformation Movement	965	2.99	0	981	3.04	1	1
Democratic Alliance	506	1.57	0	436	1.35	1	1
Pan Africanist Congress of Azania	256	0.79	0	272	0.84	1	1
Independent South African National Civic Organisation	251	0.78	0	240	0.74	0	0
African Christian Democratic Party	151	0.47	0	147	0.46	0	0
God Save Africa	97	0.30	0	130	0.40	0	0
Independent candidates	141	0.44	0				0
African People's Movement	49	0.15	0	62	0.19	0	0
National Freedom Party	9	0.03	0	69	0.21	0	0
Total	32,315	100.00	20	32,221	100.00	19	39
Valid votes	32,315	98.27		32,221	98.03		
Invalid/blank votes	568	1.73		647	1.97		
Total votes	32,883	100.00		32,868	100.00		
Registered voters/turnout	70,369	46.73		70,369	46.71		

=== By-elections from November 2021 ===
The following by-elections were held to fill vacant ward seats in the period since November 2021.

Date	Ward	Party of the previous councillor	Party of the newly elected councillor
16 Mar 2022	21307001	African National Congress	African National Congress
23 Aug 2023	8	African National Congress	African National Congress
23 Aug 2023	12	African National Congress	African National Congress
15 Oct 2025	15	African National Congress	African National Congress

== November 2026 election ==
The following table shows the results of the 2026 election.

Party	Ward			List			Total seats
Party	Votes	%	Seats	Votes	%	Seats	Total seats
African National Congress	21,505	62.51	19	21,318	62.23	5	24
African Transformation Movement	5,905	17.17	0	5,706	16.66	7	7
Ngcobo Yethu Civic Organization	2,811	8.17	0	3,132	9.14	3	3
Democratic Alliance	1,099	3.19	0	1,146	3.35	1	1
Economic Freedom Fighters	1,002	2.91	0	976	2.85	1	1
African Independent Congress	364	1.06	0	489	1.43	1	1
Pan Africanist Congress of Azania	346	1.01	0	321	0.94	1	1
South African Communist Party	350	1.02	0	308	0.90	0	0
ActionSA	249	0.72	0	264	0.77	0	0
African Congress for Transformation	170	0.49	0	177	0.52	0	0
uMkhonto weSizwe Party	145	0.42	0	181	0.53	0	0
Independent candidates	233	0.68	0				0
African Christian Democratic Party	103	0.30	0	92	0.27	0	0
Afrika Mayibuye Movement	90	0.26	0	85	0.25	0	0
Inkatha Freedom Party	27	0.08	0	39	0.11	0	0
Iliso Labantu Movement for Social Change	2	0.01	0	23	0.07	0	0
Total	34,401	100.00	19	34,257	100.00	19	38
Valid votes	34,401	97.87		34,257	97.59		
Invalid/blank votes	748	2.13		846	2.41		
Total votes	35,149	100.00		35,103	100.00		
Registered voters/turnout	77,908	45.12		77,908	45.06		
