= Mnquma Local Municipality elections =

Local elections in the Eastern Cape, South Africa

The Mnquma Local Municipality council (within the South African Amathole District Municipality) consists of sixty-three members elected by mixed-member proportional representation. Thirty-two councillors are elected by first-past-the-post voting in thirty-two wards, while the remaining thirty-one are chosen from party lists so that the total number of party representatives is proportional to the number of votes received.

In the election of 4 November 2026 the African National Congress (ANC) lost its majority but won a plurality of thirty seats.

== Results ==
The following table shows the composition of the council after past elections.

Event	AIC	ANC	COPE	DA	EFF	PAC	UDM	Other	Total
2000 election	—	40	—	1	—	3	17	0	61
2006 election	—	49	—	2	—	2	8	0	61
2011 election	—	47	7	2	—	1	4	1	62
2016 election	1	48	1	3	3	1	5	0	62
2021 election	1	45	1	1	5	2	5	3	63
2026 election	1	30	—	2	4	10	7	9	63

== December 2000 election ==
The following table shows the results of the 2000 election.

Party	Ward			List			Total seats
Party	Votes	%	Seats	Votes	%	Seats	Total seats
African National Congress	36,167	64.05	29	37,024	65.89	11	40
United Democratic Movement	15,371	27.22	2	14,699	26.16	15	17
Pan Africanist Congress of Azania	2,013	3.57	0	2,541	4.52	3	3
Democratic Alliance	511	0.91	0	1,924	3.42	1	1
Independent candidates	2,402	4.25	0				0
Total	56,464	100.00	31	56,188	100.00	30	61
Valid votes	56,464	96.67		56,188	95.69		
Invalid/blank votes	1,946	3.33		2,528	4.31		
Total votes	58,410	100.00		58,716	100.00		
Registered voters/turnout	108,102	54.03		108,102	54.32		

== March 2006 election ==
The following table shows the results of the 2006 election.

Party	Ward			List			Total seats
Party	Votes	%	Seats	Votes	%	Seats	Total seats
African National Congress	53,700	78.80	31	54,233	79.67	18	49
United Democratic Movement	8,148	11.96	0	9,393	13.80	8	8
Democratic Alliance	2,562	3.76	0	2,608	3.83	2	2
Pan Africanist Congress of Azania	1,700	2.49	0	1,834	2.69	2	2
Independent candidates	2,034	2.98	0				0
Total	68,144	100.00	31	68,068	100.00	30	61
Valid votes	68,144	97.71		68,068	97.56		
Invalid/blank votes	1,594	2.29		1,700	2.44		
Total votes	69,738	100.00		69,768	100.00		
Registered voters/turnout	120,953	57.66		120,953	57.68		

== May 2011 election ==
The following table shows the results of the 2011 election.

Party	Ward			List			Total seats
Party	Votes	%	Seats	Votes	%	Seats	Total seats
African National Congress	48,440	73.47	31	50,346	76.44	16	47
Congress of the People	7,296	11.07	0	7,445	11.30	7	7
United Democratic Movement	4,192	6.36	0	3,968	6.02	4	4
Democratic Alliance	2,287	3.47	0	2,228	3.38	2	2
Pan Africanist Congress of Azania	1,225	1.86	0	1,053	1.60	1	1
Independent candidates	1,999	3.03	0				0
African Christian Democratic Party	422	0.64	0	290	0.44	1	1
African People's Convention	75	0.11	0	533	0.81	0	0
Total	65,936	100.00	31	65,863	100.00	31	62
Valid votes	65,936	98.10		65,863	98.00		
Invalid/blank votes	1,274	1.90		1,343	2.00		
Total votes	67,210	100.00		67,206	100.00		
Registered voters/turnout	123,140	54.58		123,140	54.58		

== August 2016 election ==
The following table shows the results of the 2016 election.

Party	Ward			List			Total seats
Party	Votes	%	Seats	Votes	%	Seats	Total seats
African National Congress	48,249	76.54	31	46,693	74.15	17	48
United Democratic Movement	4,492	7.13	0	4,738	7.52	5	5
Democratic Alliance	2,993	4.75	0	2,931	4.65	3	3
Economic Freedom Fighters	2,713	4.30	0	3,183	5.05	3	3
African Independent Congress	78	0.12	0	2,699	4.29	1	1
Congress of the People	1,280	2.03	0	1,429	2.27	1	1
Independent candidates	1,971	3.13	0				0
Pan Africanist Congress of Azania	776	1.23	0	615	0.98	1	1
United Congress	275	0.44	0	425	0.67	0	0
African Christian Democratic Party	200	0.32	0	198	0.31	0	0
Kingdom Governance Movement	8	0.01	0	60	0.10	0	0
Total	63,035	100.00	31	62,971	100.00	31	62
Valid votes	63,035	97.76		62,971	97.48		
Invalid/blank votes	1,444	2.24		1,626	2.52		
Total votes	64,479	100.00		64,597	100.00		
Registered voters/turnout	126,195	51.09		126,195	51.19		

== November 2021 election ==
The following table shows the results of the 2021 election.

Party	Ward			List			Total seats
Party	Votes	%	Seats	Votes	%	Seats	Total seats
African National Congress	35,150	70.00	32	35,458	70.58	13	45
Economic Freedom Fighters	3,766	7.50	0	3,845	7.65	5	5
United Democratic Movement	3,600	7.17	0	3,815	7.59	5	5
Pan Africanist Congress of Azania	1,579	3.14	0	1,423	2.83	2	2
African Transformation Movement	1,106	2.20	0	1,153	2.30	2	2
Congress of the People	1,020	2.03	0	1,083	2.16	1	1
Democratic Alliance	901	1.79	0	978	1.95	1	1
Batho Pele Movement	915	1.82	0	803	1.60	1	1
Independent candidates	1,506	3.00	0				0
African Independent Congress	138	0.27	0	914	1.82	1	1
African People's Convention	139	0.28	0	206	0.41	0	0
African Democrats	123	0.24	0	124	0.25	0	0
African Christian Democratic Party	102	0.20	0	109	0.22	0	0
God Save Africa	81	0.16	0	114	0.23	0	0
African Multicultural Economic Congress	65	0.13	0	114	0.23	0	0
Independent South African National Civic Organisation	25	0.05	0	100	0.20	0	0
Total	50,216	100.00	32	50,239	100.00	31	63
Valid votes	50,216	98.21		50,239	98.07		
Invalid/blank votes	915	1.79		988	1.93		
Total votes	51,131	100.00		51,227	100.00		
Registered voters/turnout	121,099	42.22		121,099	42.30		

=== By-elections from November 2021 ===
The following by-elections were held to fill vacant ward seats in the period from the election in November 2021.

Date	Ward	Party of the previous councillor	Party of the newly elected councillor
15 Jun 2022	21202003	African National Congress	African National Congress
14 Aug 2024	18	African National Congress	African National Congress

== November 2026 election ==
The following table shows the results of the 2026 election.

Party	Ward			List			Total seats
Party	Votes	%	Seats	Votes	%	Seats	Total seats
African National Congress	25,631	46.15	24	27,088	48.56	6	30
Pan Africanist Congress of Azania	8,943	16.10	4	8,708	15.61	6	10
United Democratic Movement	6,111	11.00	2	6,827	12.24	5	7
South African Communist Party	4,076	7.34	2	3,800	6.81	2	4
Economic Freedom Fighters	3,602	6.49	0	3,398	6.09	4	4
African Transformation Movement	2,170	3.91	0	2,189	3.92	3	3
Democratic Alliance	1,432	2.58	0	1,369	2.45	2	2
African Independent Congress	994	1.79	0	436	0.78	1	1
Batho Pele Movement	707	1.27	0	651	1.17	1	1
uMkhonto weSizwe Party	513	0.92	0	467	0.84	1	1
African Heart Congress	390	0.70	0	227	0.41	0	0
Patriotic Alliance	182	0.33	0	164	0.29	0	0
Independent candidates	297	0.53	0				0
Afrika Mayibuye Movement	135	0.24	0	123	0.22	0	0
African Christian Democratic Party	77	0.14	0	121	0.22	0	0
African Democrats	82	0.15	0	97	0.17	0	0
Amabomvane Revolutionary Movement	74	0.13	0	67	0.12	0	0
Patriotic South Africans	80	0.14	0	55	0.10	0	0
African Congress for Transformation	37	0.07	0				0
Total	55,533	100.00	32	55,787	100.00	31	63
Valid votes	55,533	97.92		55,787	98.30		
Invalid/blank votes	1,177	2.08		967	1.70		
Total votes	56,710	100.00		56,754	100.00		
Registered voters/turnout	124,301	45.62		124,301	45.66		
