= UMlalazi Local Municipality elections =

Local elections in KwaZulu-Natal, South Africa

The uMlalazi Local Municipality council consists of fifty-five members elected by mixed-member proportional representation. Twenty-eight councillors are elected by first-past-the-post voting in twenty-eight wards, while the remaining twenty-seven are chosen from party lists so that the total number of party representatives is proportional to the number of votes received.

In the election of 4 November 2026 the Inkatha Freedom Party (IFP) lost its majority, but remains the largest party on the council, with 24 seats.

== Results ==
The following table shows the composition of the council after past elections.

Event	ANC	DA	EFF	IFP	NFP	MKP	Other	Total
2000 election	7	1	—	44	—	—	0	52
2006 election	13	1	—	37	—	—	1	52
2011 election	24	1	—	18	9	—	0	52
2016 election	30	1	1	22	—	—	0	54
2021 election	18	1	4	30	1	—	1	55
2021 election	6	2	1	24	0	21	1	55

== December 2000 election ==
The following table shows the results of the 2000 election.

Party	Ward			List			Total seats
Party	Votes	%	Seats	Votes	%	Seats	Total seats
Inkatha Freedom Party	36,791	84.50	26	35,972	82.76	18	44
African National Congress	5,632	12.93	0	5,264	12.11	7	7
Democratic Alliance	555	1.27	0	1,418	3.26	1	1
African Christian Democratic Party	309	0.71	0	454	1.04	0	0
United Democratic Movement	254	0.58	0	360	0.83	0	0
Total	43,541	100.00	26	43,468	100.00	26	52
Valid votes	43,541	98.10		43,468	97.90		
Invalid/blank votes	844	1.90		934	2.10		
Total votes	44,385	100.00		44,402	100.00		
Registered voters/turnout	88,839	49.96		88,839	49.98		

== March 2006 election ==
The following table shows the results of the 2006 election.

Party	Ward			List			Total seats
Party	Votes	%	Seats	Votes	%	Seats	Total seats
Inkatha Freedom Party	34,748	71.51	25	34,435	70.84	12	37
African National Congress	11,735	24.15	1	11,603	23.87	12	13
Democratic Alliance	911	1.87	0	1,061	2.18	1	1
National Democratic Convention	345	0.71	0	591	1.22	1	1
United Independent Front	196	0.40	0	604	1.24	0	0
Pan Africanist Congress of Azania	209	0.43	0	318	0.65	0	0
Independent candidates	451	0.93	0				0
Total	48,595	100.00	26	48,612	100.00	26	52
Valid votes	48,595	98.14		48,612	98.13		
Invalid/blank votes	921	1.86		928	1.87		
Total votes	49,516	100.00		49,540	100.00		
Registered voters/turnout	92,304	53.64		92,304	53.67		

== May 2011 election ==
The following table shows the results of the 2011 election.

Party	Ward			List			Total seats
Party	Votes	%	Seats	Votes	%	Seats	Total seats
African National Congress	26,262	44.48	14	27,446	46.44	10	24
Inkatha Freedom Party	20,859	35.33	10	19,888	33.65	8	18
National Freedom Party	10,612	17.97	2	10,172	17.21	7	9
Democratic Alliance	318	0.54	0	1,588	2.69	1	1
Independent candidates	993	1.68	0				0
Total	59,044	100.00	26	59,094	100.00	26	52
Valid votes	59,044	98.03		59,094	97.86		
Invalid/blank votes	1,188	1.97		1,295	2.14		
Total votes	60,232	100.00		60,389	100.00		
Registered voters/turnout	96,727	62.27		96,727	62.43		

== August 2016 election ==
The following table shows the results of the 2016 election.

Party	Ward			List			Total seats
Party	Votes	%	Seats	Votes	%	Seats	Total seats
African National Congress	36,565	54.30	19	37,134	55.27	11	30
Inkatha Freedom Party	26,995	40.09	8	26,547	39.51	14	22
Democratic Alliance	1,404	2.08	0	1,796	2.67	1	1
Economic Freedom Fighters	1,208	1.79	0	1,229	1.83	1	1
Independent candidates	750	1.11	0				0
Academic Congress Union	301	0.45	0	271	0.40	0	0
African Mantungwa Community	119	0.18	0	206	0.31	0	0
Total	67,342	100.00	27	67,183	100.00	27	54
Valid votes	67,342	98.73		67,183	98.50		
Invalid/blank votes	867	1.27		1,026	1.50		
Total votes	68,209	100.00		68,209	100.00		
Registered voters/turnout	108,500	62.87		108,500	62.87		

=== By-elections from August 2016 to November 2021 ===
In a by-election held on 29 November 2017, a ward previously held by an ANC councillor was won by the IFP candidate. Council composition was reconfigured as seen below:

Party	Ward	PR list	Total
African National Congress	18	11	29
Inkatha Freedom Party	9	14	23
DA	0	1	1
Economic Freedom Fighters	0	1	1
Total	27	27	54

== November 2021 election ==
The following table shows the results of the 2021 election.

Party	Ward			List			Total seats
Party	Votes	%	Seats	Votes	%	Seats	Total seats
Inkatha Freedom Party	27,555	52.75	24	28,287	54.17	6	30
African National Congress	16,929	32.41	4	17,170	32.88	14	18
Economic Freedom Fighters	3,544	6.78	0	3,411	6.53	4	4
Abantu Batho Congress	919	1.76	0	878	1.68	1	1
Democratic Alliance	764	1.46	0	889	1.70	1	1
National Freedom Party	469	0.90	0	578	1.11	1	1
Independent candidates	986	1.89	0				0
People's Freedom Party	558	1.07	0	408	0.78	0	0
The Organic Humanity Movement	143	0.27	0	118	0.23	0	0
African Christian Democratic Party	118	0.23	0	126	0.24	0	0
Academic Congress Union	92	0.18	0	75	0.14	0	0
African People's Convention	55	0.11	0	87	0.17	0	0
African People's Movement	43	0.08	0	61	0.12	0	0
Independent South African National Civic Organisation	22	0.04	0	73	0.14	0	0
African Transformation Movement	37	0.07	0	56	0.11	0	0
Total	52,234	100.00	28	52,217	100.00	27	55
Valid votes	52,234	97.98		52,217	98.14		
Invalid/blank votes	1,075	2.02		991	1.86		
Total votes	53,309	100.00		53,208	100.00		
Registered voters/turnout	106,317	50.14		106,317	50.05		

== November 2026 election ==
The following table shows the results of the 2026 election.

Party	Ward			List			Total seats
Party	Votes	%	Seats	Votes	%	Seats	Total seats
Inkatha Freedom Party	26,422	42.66	15	26,344	42.64	9	24
uMkhonto weSizwe Party	23,499	37.94	13	23,871	38.63	8	21
African National Congress	6,863	11.08	0	6,786	10.98	6	6
Democratic Alliance	1,785	2.88	0	1,864	3.02	2	2
Ubuntu Abande Political Party	907	1.46	0	865	1.40	1	1
Economic Freedom Fighters	703	1.14	0	711	1.15	1	1
Freedom Front Plus	323	0.52	0	323	0.52	0	0
National Freedom Party	226	0.36	0	185	0.30	0	0
Independent candidates	407	0.66	0				0
South African Communist Party	154	0.25	0	137	0.22	0	0
Afrika Mayibuye Movement	132	0.21	0	134	0.22	0	0
National Peoples Ambassadors	126	0.20	0	114	0.18	0	0
African Transformation Movement	85	0.14	0	113	0.18	0	0
Labour Party of South Africa	86	0.14	0	89	0.14	0	0
African Economic Freedom	67	0.11	0	75	0.12	0	0
Service Delivery Party	69	0.11	0	49	0.08	0	0
United Christian Democratic Party	45	0.07	0	59	0.10	0	0
Umkhumbi Wesizwe Organisation	6	0.01	0	69	0.11	0	0
African Renaissance Unity	31	0.05	0				0
Total	61,936	100.00	28	61,788	100.00	27	55
Valid votes	61,936	98.57		61,788	98.59		
Invalid/blank votes	898	1.43		885	1.41		
Total votes	62,834	100.00		62,673	100.00		
Registered voters/turnout	118,373	53.08		118,373	52.95		
