= Mbhashe Local Municipality elections =

Local elections in the Eastern Cape, South Africa

The Mbhashe Local Municipality council (within the South African Amathole District Municipality) consists of sixty-three members elected by mixed-member proportional representation. Thirty-two councillors are elected by first-past-the-post voting in thirty-two wards, while the remaining thirty-one are chosen from party lists so that the total number of party representatives is proportional to the number of votes received.

In the election of 4 November 2026 the African National Congress (ANC) won a reduced majority of thirty-two seats.

== Results ==
The following table shows the composition of the council after past elections.

Event	ANC	COPE	DA	EFF	IND	PAC	UDM	Other	Total
2000 election	28	—	—	—	0	—	19	—	47
2006 election	43	—	0	—	0	1	7	0	51
2011 election	41	9	1	—	2	0	7	1	61
2016 election	47	1	2	2	2	0	9	0	63
2021 election	45	0	1	4	1	1	8	3	63
2026 election	32	—	2	2	1	1	14	11	63

== December 2000 election ==
The following table shows the results of the 2000 election.

Party	Ward			List			Total seats
Party	Votes	%	Seats	Votes	%	Seats	Total seats
African National Congress	27,682	59.17	17	27,753	59.90	11	28
United Democratic Movement	18,413	39.36	7	18,580	40.10	12	19
Independent candidates	690	1.47	0				0
Total	46,785	100.00	24	46,333	100.00	23	47
Valid votes	46,785	96.38		46,333	96.48		
Invalid/blank votes	1,757	3.62		1,690	3.52		
Total votes	48,542	100.00		48,023	100.00		
Registered voters/turnout	80,639	60.20		80,639	59.55		

== March 2006 election ==
The following table shows the results of the 2006 election.

Party	Ward			List			Total seats
Party	Votes	%	Seats	Votes	%	Seats	Total seats
African National Congress	52,865	84.35	26	52,367	83.54	17	43
United Democratic Movement	7,931	12.65	0	8,996	14.35	7	7
Pan Africanist Congress of Azania	960	1.53	0	714	1.14	1	1
African Christian Democratic Party	379	0.60	0	289	0.46	0	0
Democratic Alliance	259	0.41	0	322	0.51	0	0
Independent candidates	277	0.44	0				0
Total	62,671	100.00	26	62,688	100.00	25	51
Valid votes	62,671	97.56		62,688	97.94		
Invalid/blank votes	1,565	2.44		1,318	2.06		
Total votes	64,236	100.00		64,006	100.00		
Registered voters/turnout	100,465	63.94		100,465	63.71		

== May 2011 election ==
The following table shows the results of the 2011 election.

Party	Ward			List			Total seats
Party	Votes	%	Seats	Votes	%	Seats	Total seats
African National Congress	39,997	61.91	28	41,962	70.26	13	41
Congress of the People	9,026	13.97	0	9,086	15.21	9	9
United Democratic Movement	6,719	10.40	1	6,798	11.38	6	7
Independent candidates	7,256	11.23	2				2
Democratic Alliance	654	1.01	0	678	1.14	1	1
African People's Convention	269	0.42	0	515	0.86	1	1
Pan Africanist Congress of Azania	243	0.38	0	302	0.51	0	0
African Christian Democratic Party	277	0.43	0	263	0.44	0	0
United Independent Front	165	0.26	0	116	0.19	0	0
Total	64,606	100.00	31	59,720	100.00	30	61
Valid votes	64,606	97.32		59,720	92.70		
Invalid/blank votes	1,782	2.68		4,704	7.30		
Total votes	66,388	100.00		64,424	100.00		
Registered voters/turnout	113,875	58.30		113,875	56.57		

== August 2016 election ==
The following table shows the results of the 2016 election.

Party	Ward			List			Total seats
Party	Votes	%	Seats	Votes	%	Seats	Total seats
African National Congress	48,135	70.54	30	50,370	75.73	17	47
United Democratic Movement	9,309	13.64	0	10,147	15.26	9	9
Independent candidates	6,442	9.44	2				2
Economic Freedom Fighters	1,942	2.85	0	2,401	3.61	2	2
Democratic Alliance	1,437	2.11	0	1,533	2.30	2	2
Congress of the People	406	0.59	0	751	1.13	1	1
Pan Africanist Congress of Azania	375	0.55	0	466	0.70	0	0
African People's Convention	54	0.08	0	496	0.75	0	0
United Front of the Eastern Cape	140	0.21	0	350	0.53	0	0
Total	68,240	100.00	32	66,514	100.00	31	63
Valid votes	68,240	98.14		66,514	96.08		
Invalid/blank votes	1,294	1.86		2,716	3.92		
Total votes	69,534	100.00		69,230	100.00		
Registered voters/turnout	129,921	53.52		129,921	53.29		

== November 2021 election ==
The following table shows the results of the 2021 election.

Party	Ward			List			Total seats
Party	Votes	%	Seats	Votes	%	Seats	Total seats
African National Congress	36,734	66.49	30	39,028	71.59	15	45
United Democratic Movement	6,361	11.51	1	7,368	13.52	7	8
Economic Freedom Fighters	3,041	5.50	0	3,386	6.21	4	4
Independent candidates	5,439	9.85	1				1
African Transformation Movement	1,122	2.03	0	1,186	2.18	1	1
Democratic Alliance	809	1.46	0	771	1.41	1	1
Batho Pele Movement	554	1.00	0	596	1.09	1	1
Alliance for Transformation for All	287	0.52	0	614	1.13	1	1
Pan Africanist Congress of Azania	292	0.53	0	415	0.76	1	1
African Democrats	192	0.35	0	410	0.75	0	0
African People's Convention	195	0.35	0	191	0.35	0	0
Congress of the People	63	0.11	0	322	0.59	0	0
Al Jama-ah	155	0.28	0	88	0.16	0	0
Power of Africans Unity	0	0.00	0	142	0.26	0	0
Total	55,244	100.00	32	54,517	100.00	31	63
Valid votes	55,244	97.64		54,517	96.78		
Invalid/blank votes	1,334	2.36		1,813	3.22		
Total votes	56,578	100.00		56,330	100.00		
Registered voters/turnout	122,433	46.21		122,433	46.01		

=== By-elections from November 2021 ===
The following by-elections were held to fill vacant ward seats in the period since the election in November 2021.

Date	Ward	Party of the previous councillor	Party of the newly elected councillor
25 January 2023	5	African National Congress	African National Congress
14 September 2023	1	African National Congress	African National Congress
14 September 2023	2	African National Congress	African National Congress

In a ward 5 by-election on 25 January, held after the death of the ANC councillor, the ANC candidate retained the seat for the party.

== November 2026 election ==
The following table shows the results of the 2026 election.

Party	Ward			List			Total seats
Party	Votes	%	Seats	Votes	%	Seats	Total seats
African National Congress	30,520	49.97	27	31,072	51.08	5	32
United Democratic Movement	13,034	21.34	2	13,668	22.47	12	14
South African Communist Party	6,187	10.13	2	6,656	10.94	5	7
African Transformation Movement	3,257	5.33	0	3,331	5.48	3	3
Economic Freedom Fighters	2,146	3.51	0	2,208	3.63	2	2
Democratic Alliance	1,421	2.33	0	1,420	2.33	2	2
Independent candidates	2,064	3.38	1				1
African Democrats	796	1.30	0	847	1.39	1	1
Pan Africanist Congress of Azania	441	0.72	0	423	0.70	1	1
Batho Pele Movement	341	0.56	0	318	0.52	0	0
Labour Party of South Africa	236	0.39	0	221	0.36	0	0
Amabomvane Revolutionary Movement	204	0.33	0	207	0.34	0	0
African Christian Democratic Party	111	0.18	0	152	0.25	0	0
uMkhonto weSizwe Party	95	0.16	0	148	0.24	0	0
Afrika Mayibuye Movement	94	0.15	0	113	0.19	0	0
Patriotic Alliance	131	0.21	0	46	0.08	0	0
Total	61,078	100.00	32	60,830	100.00	31	63
Valid votes	61,078	97.61		60,830	97.33		
Invalid/blank votes	1,493	2.39		1,666	2.67		
Total votes	62,571	100.00		62,496	100.00		
Registered voters/turnout	133,613	46.83		133,613	46.77		
