= Nkomazi Local Municipality elections =

The Nkomazi Local Municipality is a Local Municipality in Mpumalanga, South Africa. The council consists of sixty-five members elected by mixed-member proportional representation. Thirty-three councillors are elected by first-past-the-post voting in thirty-three wards, while the remaining thirty-two are chosen from party lists so that the total number of party representatives is proportional to the number of votes received. In the election of 1 November 2021 the African National Congress (ANC) won a majority of fifty seats.

== Results ==
The following table shows the composition of the council after past elections.

Event	ACDP	ANC	DA	EFF	Other	Total
2000 election	1	54	4	—	1	60
2006 election	1	56	3	—	0	60
2011 election	1	60	4	—	0	65
2016 election	0	54	4	7	0	65
2021 election	0	50	4	9	2	65

== December 2000 election ==
The following table shows the results of the 2000 election.

Party	Ward			List			Total seats
Party	Votes	%	Seats	Votes	%	Seats	Total seats
African National Congress	44,788	90.51	29	45,853	90.00	25	54
Democratic Alliance	3,461	6.99	1	3,097	6.08	3	4
Inkatha Freedom Party	849	1.72	0	749	1.47	1	1
African Christian Democratic Party	347	0.70	0	660	1.30	1	1
United Democratic Movement	41	0.08	0	587	1.15	0	0
Total	49,486	100.00	30	50,946	100.00	30	60
Valid votes	49,486	97.01		50,946	97.34		
Invalid/blank votes	1,526	2.99		1,391	2.66		
Total votes	51,012	100.00		52,337	100.00		
Registered voters/turnout	103,021	49.52		103,021	50.80		

== March 2006 election ==
The following table shows the results of the 2006 election.

Party	Ward			List			Total seats
Party	Votes	%	Seats	Votes	%	Seats	Total seats
African National Congress	60,292	91.47	30	60,571	92.42	26	56
Democratic Alliance	2,838	4.31	0	2,907	4.44	3	3
African Christian Democratic Party	722	1.10	0	700	1.07	1	1
Independent candidates	1,183	1.79	0				0
Freedom Front Plus	487	0.74	0	442	0.67	0	0
Inkatha Freedom Party	318	0.48	0	588	0.90	0	0
Independent Democrats	71	0.11	0	328	0.50	0	0
Total	65,911	100.00	30	65,536	100.00	30	60
Valid votes	65,911	98.03		65,536	97.74		
Invalid/blank votes	1,323	1.97		1,518	2.26		
Total votes	67,234	100.00		67,054	100.00		
Registered voters/turnout	127,999	52.53		127,999	52.39		

== May 2011 election ==
The following table shows the results of the 2011 election.

Party	Ward			List			Total seats
Party	Votes	%	Seats	Votes	%	Seats	Total seats
African National Congress	72,866	87.48	33	76,028	91.39	27	60
Democratic Alliance	5,240	6.29	0	5,634	6.77	4	4
Independent candidates	4,009	4.81	0				0
African Christian Democratic Party	745	0.89	0	626	0.75	1	1
African People's Convention	190	0.23	0	606	0.73	0	0
Pan Africanist Congress of Azania	247	0.30	0	294	0.35	0	0
Total	83,297	100.00	33	83,188	100.00	32	65
Valid votes	83,297	98.14		83,188	98.05		
Invalid/blank votes	1,580	1.86		1,657	1.95		
Total votes	84,877	100.00		84,845	100.00		
Registered voters/turnout	146,958	57.76		146,958	57.73		

== August 2016 election ==
The following table shows the results of the 2016 election.

Party	Ward			List			Total seats
Party	Votes	%	Seats	Votes	%	Seats	Total seats
African National Congress	83,227	82.85	33	83,259	82.87	21	54
Economic Freedom Fighters	10,225	10.18	0	9,941	9.89	7	7
Democratic Alliance	5,703	5.68	0	5,774	5.75	4	4
Congress of the People	475	0.47	0	325	0.32	0	0
African People's Convention	188	0.19	0	519	0.52	0	0
Freedom Front Plus	267	0.27	0	235	0.23	0	0
African Christian Democratic Party	212	0.21	0	201	0.20	0	0
Pan Africanist Congress of Azania	155	0.15	0	105	0.10	0	0
Inkatha Freedom Party				113	0.11	0	0
Total	100,452	100.00	33	100,472	100.00	32	65
Valid votes	100,452	98.70		100,472	98.72		
Invalid/blank votes	1,325	1.30		1,299	1.28		
Total votes	101,777	100.00		101,771	100.00		
Registered voters/turnout	167,009	60.94		167,009	60.94		

== November 2021 election ==
The following table shows the results of the 2021 election.

Party	Ward			List			Total seats
Party	Votes	%	Seats	Votes	%	Seats	Total seats
African National Congress	53,502	69.61	33	58,121	75.89	17	50
Economic Freedom Fighters	9,236	12.02	0	11,085	14.47	9	9
Democratic Alliance	4,191	5.45	0	4,283	5.59	4	4
Independent candidates	7,504	9.76	0				0
African Transformation Movement	724	0.94	0	773	1.01	1	1
Freedom Front Plus	630	0.82	0	682	0.89	1	1
Power of Africans Unity	271	0.35	0	376	0.49	0	0
African People's Convention	323	0.42	0	304	0.40	0	0
African Christian Democratic Party	190	0.25	0	228	0.30	0	0
Spectrum National Party	121	0.16	0	167	0.22	0	0
Pan Africanist Congress of Azania	24	0.03	0	213	0.28	0	0
African Voice	90	0.12	0	105	0.14	0	0
United Democratic Movement	35	0.05	0	121	0.16	0	0
Congress of the People	15	0.02	0	126	0.16	0	0
Total	76,856	100.00	33	76,584	100.00	32	65
Valid votes	76,856	98.23		76,584	98.02		
Invalid/blank votes	1,388	1.77		1,550	1.98		
Total votes	78,244	100.00		78,134	100.00		
Registered voters/turnout	172,783	45.28		172,783	45.22		

=== By-elections from November 2021 ===
The following by-elections were held to fill vacant ward seats in the period from November 2021. A number of ANC councillors were expelled by the party after working with the EFF to elect Johan Mkhatshwa, former mayor and the top-ranked ANC candidate on the proportional list, elected as mayor. The ANC candidates won both available seats in the August by-elections, although the party received less than 50% of the votes in ward 10. The EFF won the October by-election in ward 11, its first ward win in the province.

Date	Ward	Party of the previous councillor	Party of the newly elected councillor
31 August 2022	10	African National Congress	African National Congress
31 August 2022	13	African National Congress	African National Congress
19 October 2022	11	African National Congress	Economic Freedom Fighters
23 November 2022	4	African National Congress	African National Congress

=== By-elections from November 2021 ===
The following by-elections were held to fill vacant ward seats in the period since November 2021.

Date	Ward	Party of the previous councillor	Party of the newly elected councillor
28 Aug 2024	17	African National Congress	African National Congress
