= Intsika Yethu Local Municipality elections =

The Intsika Yethu Local Municipality council (within the South African Chris Hani District Municipality) consists of forty-two members elected by mixed-member proportional representation. Twenty-one councillors are elected by first-past-the-post voting in twenty-one wards, while the remaining twenty-one are chosen from party lists so that the total number of party representatives is proportional to the number of votes received. In the election of 1 November 2021 the African National Congress (ANC) won a majority of thirty-five seats.

== Results ==
The following table shows the composition of the council after past elections.

Event	ANC	DA	EFF	PAC	UDM	Other	Total
2000 election	37	0	—	2	7	0	46
2006 election	41	—	—	2	3	0	46
2011 election	37	0	—	1	2	2	42
2016 election	35	1	3	1	2	0	42
2021 election	35	1	4	1	1	0	42

== December 2000 election ==
The following table shows the results of the 2000 election.

Party	Ward			List			Total seats
Party	Votes	%	Seats	Votes	%	Seats	Total seats
African National Congress	30,835	77.23	23	31,771	79.14	14	37
United Democratic Movement	6,336	15.87	0	6,091	15.17	7	7
Pan Africanist Congress of Azania	1,069	2.68	0	1,624	4.05	2	2
Independent candidates	1,459	3.65	0				0
Democratic Alliance	226	0.57	0	660	1.64	0	0
Total	39,925	100.00	23	40,146	100.00	23	46
Valid votes	39,925	96.85		40,146	96.86		
Invalid/blank votes	1,299	3.15		1,303	3.14		
Total votes	41,224	100.00		41,449	100.00		
Registered voters/turnout	71,334	57.79		71,334	58.11		

== March 2006 election ==
The following table shows the results of the 2006 election.

Party	Ward			List			Total seats
Party	Votes	%	Seats	Votes	%	Seats	Total seats
African National Congress	41,329	88.45	23	41,955	89.34	18	41
United Democratic Movement	3,110	6.66	0	3,287	7.00	3	3
Pan Africanist Congress of Azania	1,699	3.64	0	1,720	3.66	2	2
Independent candidates	590	1.26	0				0
Total	46,728	100.00	23	46,962	100.00	23	46
Valid votes	46,728	97.60		46,962	97.46		
Invalid/blank votes	1,149	2.40		1,226	2.54		
Total votes	47,877	100.00		48,188	100.00		
Registered voters/turnout	78,899	60.68		78,899	61.08		

== May 2011 election ==
The following table shows the results of the 2011 election.

Party	Ward			List			Total seats
Party	Votes	%	Seats	Votes	%	Seats	Total seats
African National Congress	37,165	87.83	21	37,956	88.35	16	37
Congress of the People	1,908	4.51	0	1,958	4.56	2	2
United Democratic Movement	1,656	3.91	0	1,466	3.41	2	2
Pan Africanist Congress of Azania	517	1.22	0	555	1.29	1	1
Democratic Alliance	504	1.19	0	445	1.04	0	0
African People's Convention	217	0.51	0	360	0.84	0	0
Pan Africanist Movement	276	0.65	0	220	0.51	0	0
Inkatha Freedom Party	55	0.13	0				0
National Freedom Party	16	0.04	0				0
Total	42,314	100.00	21	42,960	100.00	21	42
Valid votes	42,314	98.36		42,960	98.52		
Invalid/blank votes	706	1.64		645	1.48		
Total votes	43,020	100.00		43,605	100.00		
Registered voters/turnout	72,149	59.63		72,149	60.44		

== August 2016 election ==
The following table shows the results of the 2016 election.

Party	Ward			List			Total seats
Party	Votes	%	Seats	Votes	%	Seats	Total seats
African National Congress	35,330	80.15	21	36,163	81.82	14	35
Economic Freedom Fighters	2,755	6.25	0	2,890	6.54	3	3
United Democratic Movement	1,409	3.20	0	2,331	5.27	2	2
Independent candidates	2,816	6.39	0				0
Democratic Alliance	974	2.21	0	1,027	2.32	1	1
Pan Africanist Congress of Azania	346	0.78	0	597	1.35	1	1
African People's Convention	279	0.63	0	418	0.95	0	0
Pan Africanist Movement	126	0.29	0	341	0.77	0	0
Congress of the People	19	0.04	0	338	0.76	0	0
Inkatha Freedom Party	26	0.06	0	91	0.21	0	0
Total	44,080	100.00	21	44,196	100.00	21	42
Valid votes	44,080	97.65		44,196	97.97		
Invalid/blank votes	1,061	2.35		914	2.03		
Total votes	45,141	100.00		45,110	100.00		
Registered voters/turnout	77,938	57.92		77,938	57.88		

== November 2021 election ==
The following table shows the results of the 2021 election.

Party	Ward			List			Total seats
Party	Votes	%	Seats	Votes	%	Seats	Total seats
African National Congress	27,300	75.75	21	28,280	81.16	14	35
Economic Freedom Fighters	2,995	8.31	0	3,249	9.32	4	4
Independent candidates	3,590	9.96	0				0
United Democratic Movement	783	2.17	0	1,192	3.42	1	1
Democratic Alliance	680	1.89	0	675	1.94	1	1
Pan Africanist Congress of Azania	369	1.02	0	767	2.20	1	1
African Transformation Movement	321	0.89	0	489	1.40	0	0
Inkatha Freedom Party	2	0.01	0	192	0.55	0	0
Total	36,040	100.00	21	34,844	100.00	21	42
Valid votes	36,040	97.80		34,844	96.52		
Invalid/blank votes	809	2.20		1,256	3.48		
Total votes	36,849	100.00		36,100	100.00		
Registered voters/turnout	75,098	49.07		75,098	48.07		

=== By-elections from November 2021 ===
The following by-elections were held to fill vacant ward seats in the period since November 2021.

Date	Ward	Party of the previous councillor	Party of the newly elected councillor
16 Mar 2022	21305005	African National Congress	African National Congress
14 Aug 2024	12	African National Congress	African National Congress
9 Oct 2024	12	African National Congress	African National Congress
2 Apr 2025	13	African National Congress	African National Congress
