= Sakhisizwe Local Municipality elections =

The Sakhisizwe Local Municipality council (within the South African Chris Hani District Municipality) consists of seventeen members elected by mixed-member proportional representation. Nine councillors are elected by first-past-the-post voting in nine wards, while the remaining eight are chosen from party lists so that the total number of party representatives is proportional to the number of votes received. In the election of 1 November 2021 the African National Congress (ANC) won a majority of thirteen seats.

== Results ==
The following table shows the composition of the council after past elections.

Event	ANC	DA	EFF	PAC	UDM	Other	Total
2000 election	8	—	—	2	1	0	11
2006 election	11	—	—	1	1	0	13
2011 election	14	1	—	—	0	2	17
2016 election	14	1	1	0	1	0	17
2021 election	13	2	1	0	0	1	17

== December 2000 election ==
The following table shows the results of the 2000 election.

Party	Ward			List			Total seats
Party	Votes	%	Seats	Votes	%	Seats	Total seats
African National Congress	8,166	74.62	6	8,236	75.06	2	8
Pan Africanist Congress of Azania	1,517	13.86	0	1,423	12.97	2	2
United Democratic Movement	789	7.21	0	928	8.46	1	1
Democratic Alliance	355	3.24	0	385	3.51	0	0
Independent candidates	116	1.06	0				0
Total	10,943	100.00	6	10,972	100.00	5	11
Valid votes	10,943	97.41		10,972	97.56		
Invalid/blank votes	291	2.59		274	2.44		
Total votes	11,234	100.00		11,246	100.00		
Registered voters/turnout	19,187	58.55		19,187	58.61		

== March 2006 election ==
The following table shows the results of the 2006 election.

Party	Ward			List			Total seats
Party	Votes	%	Seats	Votes	%	Seats	Total seats
African National Congress	11,506	80.89	7	11,838	83.42	4	11
Pan Africanist Congress of Azania	1,173	8.25	0	1,266	8.92	1	1
United Democratic Movement	749	5.27	0	879	6.19	1	1
Independent candidates	544	3.82	0				0
Democratic Alliance	252	1.77	0	208	1.47	0	0
Total	14,224	100.00	7	14,191	100.00	6	13
Valid votes	14,224	97.78		14,191	97.64		
Invalid/blank votes	323	2.22		343	2.36		
Total votes	14,547	100.00		14,534	100.00		
Registered voters/turnout	26,015	55.92		26,015	55.87		

== May 2011 election ==
The following table shows the results of the 2011 election.

Party	Ward			List			Total seats
Party	Votes	%	Seats	Votes	%	Seats	Total seats
African National Congress	13,381	81.43	9	13,582	82.31	5	14
Congress of the People	1,340	8.15	0	1,313	7.96	1	1
Democratic Alliance	800	4.87	0	636	3.85	1	1
African People's Convention	443	2.70	0	417	2.53	1	1
United Democratic Movement	389	2.37	0	434	2.63	0	0
African Christian Democratic Party	57	0.35	0	53	0.32	0	0
Pan Africanist Movement	23	0.14	0	67	0.41	0	0
Total	16,433	100.00	9	16,502	100.00	8	17
Valid votes	16,433	97.89		16,502	98.29		
Invalid/blank votes	355	2.11		287	1.71		
Total votes	16,788	100.00		16,789	100.00		
Registered voters/turnout	29,165	57.56		29,165	57.57		

== August 2016 election ==
The following table shows the results of the 2016 election.

Party	Ward			List			Total seats
Party	Votes	%	Seats	Votes	%	Seats	Total seats
African National Congress	13,491	82.29	9	13,287	81.84	5	14
Democratic Alliance	1,158	7.06	0	1,152	7.10	1	1
Economic Freedom Fighters	739	4.51	0	750	4.62	1	1
United Democratic Movement	437	2.67	0	449	2.77	1	1
Congress of the People	272	1.66	0	257	1.58	0	0
African People's Convention	129	0.79	0	153	0.94	0	0
Pan Africanist Congress of Azania	149	0.91	0	125	0.77	0	0
Pan Africanist Movement	19	0.12	0	63	0.39	0	0
Total	16,394	100.00	9	16,236	100.00	8	17
Valid votes	16,394	96.89		16,236	96.17		
Invalid/blank votes	526	3.11		647	3.83		
Total votes	16,920	100.00		16,883	100.00		
Registered voters/turnout	30,632	55.24		30,632	55.12		

== November 2021 election ==
The following table shows the results of the 2021 election.

Party	Ward			List			Total seats
Party	Votes	%	Seats	Votes	%	Seats	Total seats
African National Congress	9,609	67.16	9	10,299	73.07	4	13
Democratic Alliance	1,097	7.67	0	1,238	8.78	2	2
Economic Freedom Fighters	935	6.53	0	1,034	7.34	1	1
Independent candidates	1,424	9.95	0				0
African Transformation Movement	473	3.31	0	484	3.43	1	1
United Democratic Movement	288	2.01	0	458	3.25	0	0
Pan Africanist Congress of Azania	185	1.29	0	313	2.22	0	0
Khowa Residents Association	175	1.22	0	269	1.91	0	0
Drakensberg Concerned Residents	122	0.85	0				0
Total	14,308	100.00	9	14,095	100.00	8	17
Valid votes	14,308	97.60		14,095	97.30		
Invalid/blank votes	352	2.40		391	2.70		
Total votes	14,660	100.00		14,486	100.00		
Registered voters/turnout	30,028	48.82		30,028	48.24		

=== By-elections from November 2021 ===
The following by-elections were held to fill vacant ward seats in the period since November 2021.

Date	Ward	Party of the previous councillor	Party of the newly elected councillor
15 Apr 2026	9	African National Congress	African National Congress
