= Kumkani Mhlontlo Local Municipality elections =

The Kumkani Mhlontlo Local Municipality council consists of fifty-one members elected by mixed-member proportional representation. Twenty-six councillors are elected by first-past-the-post voting in twenty-six wards, while the remaining twenty-five are chosen from party lists so that the total number of party representatives is proportional to the number of votes received. In the election of 1 November 2021 the African National Congress (ANC) won a majority of forty seats.

== Results ==
The following table shows the composition of the council after past elections.

Event	ANC	DA	EFF	IND	UDM	Other	Total
2000 election	21	—	—	0	12	—	33
2006 election	37	—	—	0	4	1	42
2011 election	48	—	—	0	3	1	52
2016 election	40	2	2	2	3	2	51
2021 election	40	1	3	1	3	3	51

== December 2000 election ==
The following table shows the results of the 2000 election.

Party	Ward			List			Total seats
Party	Votes	%	Seats	Votes	%	Seats	Total seats
African National Congress	21,909	64.80	16	21,694	64.20	5	21
United Democratic Movement	11,523	34.08	1	12,098	35.80	11	12
Independent candidates	376	1.11	0				0
Total	33,808	100.00	17	33,792	100.00	16	33
Valid votes	33,808	97.55		33,792	97.54		
Invalid/blank votes	849	2.45		853	2.46		
Total votes	34,657	100.00		34,645	100.00		
Registered voters/turnout	66,112	52.42		66,112	52.40		

== March 2006 election ==
The following table shows the results of the 2006 election.

Party	Ward			List			Total seats
Party	Votes	%	Seats	Votes	%	Seats	Total seats
African National Congress	41,265	85.24	21	42,130	86.87	16	37
United Democratic Movement	4,355	9.00	0	4,824	9.95	4	4
United Independent Front	1,123	2.32	0	1,115	2.30	1	1
Independent candidates	1,466	3.03	0				0
Pan Africanist Congress of Azania	204	0.42	0	429	0.88	0	0
Total	48,413	100.00	21	48,498	100.00	21	42
Valid votes	48,413	97.85		48,498	98.00		
Invalid/blank votes	1,062	2.15		991	2.00		
Total votes	49,475	100.00		49,489	100.00		
Registered voters/turnout	84,347	58.66		84,347	58.67		

== May 2011 election ==
The following table shows the results of the 2011 election.

Party	Ward			List			Total seats
Party	Votes	%	Seats	Votes	%	Seats	Total seats
African National Congress	44,631	90.53	26	45,287	91.07	22	48
United Democratic Movement	2,994	6.07	0	2,841	5.71	3	3
Congress of the People	1,186	2.41	0	1,288	2.59	1	1
Independent candidates	408	0.83	0				0
African People's Convention	80	0.16	0	314	0.63	0	0
Total	49,299	100.00	26	49,730	100.00	26	52
Valid votes	49,299	97.18		49,730	97.72		
Invalid/blank votes	1,432	2.82		1,158	2.28		
Total votes	50,731	100.00		50,888	100.00		
Registered voters/turnout	90,368	56.14		90,368	56.31		

== August 2016 election ==
The following table shows the results of the 2016 election.

Party	Ward			List			Total seats
Party	Votes	%	Seats	Votes	%	Seats	Total seats
African National Congress	38,067	76.62	24	39,974	79.55	16	40
United Democratic Movement	2,821	5.68	0	3,155	6.28	3	3
Civic Independent	1,449	2.92	0	3,615	7.19	2	2
Independent candidates	3,823	7.69	2				2
Democratic Alliance	1,644	3.31	0	1,622	3.23	2	2
Economic Freedom Fighters	1,624	3.27	0	1,572	3.13	2	2
Congress of the People	255	0.51	0	313	0.62	0	0
Total	49,683	100.00	26	50,251	100.00	25	51
Valid votes	49,683	97.72		50,251	97.58		
Invalid/blank votes	1,158	2.28		1,245	2.42		
Total votes	50,841	100.00		51,496	100.00		
Registered voters/turnout	96,967	52.43		96,967	53.11		

== November 2021 election ==
The following table shows the results of the 2021 election.

Party	Ward			List			Total seats
Party	Votes	%	Seats	Votes	%	Seats	Total seats
African National Congress	29,816	71.69	25	32,001	77.74	15	40
United Democratic Movement	2,218	5.33	0	2,749	6.68	3	3
Economic Freedom Fighters	2,294	5.52	0	2,491	6.05	3	3
Independent candidates	4,436	10.67	1				1
African Transformation Movement	1,757	4.22	0	1,810	4.40	2	2
Independent South African National Civic Organisation	333	0.80	0	1,253	3.04	1	1
Democratic Alliance	612	1.47	0	609	1.48	1	1
Batho Pele Movement	120	0.29	0	98	0.24	0	0
Civic Independent	2	0.00	0	153	0.37	0	0
Total	41,588	100.00	26	41,164	100.00	25	51
Valid votes	41,588	97.02		41,164	97.06		
Invalid/blank votes	1,276	2.98		1,246	2.94		
Total votes	42,864	100.00		42,410	100.00		
Registered voters/turnout	93,164	46.01		93,164	45.52		

=== By-elections from November 2021 ===
The following by-elections were held to fill vacant ward seats in the period from November 2021.

Date	Ward	Party of the previous councillor	Party of the newly elected councillor
30 November 2022	20	African National Congress	African National Congress
15 November 2023	23	African National Congress	African National Congress

After the death of the African National Congress (ANC) councillor in ward 20, a by-election was held on 30 November 2022. Besides the ANC, the United Democratic Movement (UDM), Economic Freedom Fighters (EFF), African Transformation Movement (ATM) and the Independent South African National Civic Organisation (Isanco) contested. The ANC candidate retained the seat for the party, winning 70% of the votes.
