= King Sabata Dalindyebo Local Municipality elections =

The King Sabata Dalindyebo Local Municipality council consists of seventy-three members elected by mixed-member proportional representation. Thirty-seven councillors are elected by first-past-the-post voting in thirty-seven wards, while the remaining thirty-six are chosen from party lists so that the total number of party representatives is proportional to the number of votes received. In the election of 1 November 2021 the African National Congress (ANC) won a majority of forty-eight seats.

== Results ==
The following table shows the composition of the council after past elections.

Event	ANC	DA	EFF	PAC	UDM	Other	Total
2000 election	28	0	—	2	33	1	64
2006 election	47	0	—	1	16	0	64
2011 election	46	2	—	—	18	4	70
2016 election	46	3	3	0	16	4	72
2021 election	48	1	5	0	11	8	73

== December 2000 election ==
The following table shows the results of the 2000 election.

Party	Ward			List			Total seats
Party	Votes	%	Seats	Votes	%	Seats	Total seats
United Democratic Movement	30,225	47.80	17	32,751	50.41	16	33
African National Congress	27,034	42.75	15	28,473	43.82	13	28
Independent candidates	3,831	6.06	0				0
Pan Africanist Congress of Azania	1,707	2.70	0	1,555	2.39	2	2
African Christian Democratic Party	202	0.32	0	1,224	1.88	1	1
Democratic Alliance	234	0.37	0	967	1.49	0	0
Total	63,233	100.00	32	64,970	100.00	32	64
Valid votes	63,233	96.45		64,970	96.46		
Invalid/blank votes	2,326	3.55		2,381	3.54		
Total votes	65,559	100.00		67,351	100.00		
Registered voters/turnout	147,728	44.38		147,728	45.59		

== March 2006 election ==
The following table shows the results of the 2006 election.

Party	Ward			List			Total seats
Party	Votes	%	Seats	Votes	%	Seats	Total seats
African National Congress	62,838	72.31	32	63,132	72.50	15	47
United Democratic Movement	20,919	24.07	0	21,072	24.20	16	16
Pan Africanist Congress of Azania	1,729	1.99	0	1,505	1.73	1	1
United Independent Front	414	0.48	0	551	0.63	0	0
Democratic Alliance	382	0.44	0	575	0.66	0	0
Independent Democrats	200	0.23	0	245	0.28	0	0
Independent candidates	415	0.48	0				0
Total	86,897	100.00	32	87,080	100.00	32	64
Valid votes	86,897	97.94		87,080	97.97		
Invalid/blank votes	1,824	2.06		1,801	2.03		
Total votes	88,721	100.00		88,881	100.00		
Registered voters/turnout	178,964	49.57		178,964	49.66		

== May 2011 election ==
The following table shows the results of the 2011 election.

Party	Ward			List			Total seats
Party	Votes	%	Seats	Votes	%	Seats	Total seats
African National Congress	59,025	65.14	33	60,412	66.04	13	46
United Democratic Movement	23,441	25.87	1	22,861	24.99	17	18
Democratic Alliance	2,596	2.86	0	2,641	2.89	2	2
Congress of the People	1,454	1.60	0	3,086	3.37	2	2
Independent candidates	2,037	2.25	1				1
Civic Alliance of South Africa	1,192	1.32	0	819	0.90	1	1
African Christian Democratic Party	477	0.53	0	382	0.42	0	0
African People's Convention	307	0.34	0	500	0.55	0	0
Civic Independent	5	0.01	0	480	0.52	0	0
National Freedom Party	29	0.03	0	210	0.23	0	0
United Independent Front	49	0.05	0	83	0.09	0	0
Total	90,612	100.00	35	91,474	100.00	35	70
Valid votes	90,612	97.85		91,474	98.32		
Invalid/blank votes	1,988	2.15		1,560	1.68		
Total votes	92,600	100.00		93,034	100.00		
Registered voters/turnout	194,640	47.58		194,640	47.80		

== August 2016 election ==
The following table shows the results of the 2016 election.

Party	Ward			List			Total seats
Party	Votes	%	Seats	Votes	%	Seats	Total seats
African National Congress	58,835	62.79	35	59,144	63.31	11	46
United Democratic Movement	20,245	21.61	1	20,571	22.02	15	16
Mthatha Ratepayers and Residents Association	4,520	4.82	0	4,143	4.44	4	4
Democratic Alliance	4,168	4.45	0	4,165	4.46	3	3
Economic Freedom Fighters	3,915	4.18	0	4,159	4.45	3	3
Independent candidates	1,001	1.07	0				0
Pan Africanist Congress of Azania	270	0.29	0	504	0.54	0	0
African Independent Congress	575	0.61	0				0
South African Security Organisation	108	0.12	0	419	0.45	0	0
Civic Alliance of South Africa	62	0.07	0	310	0.33	0	0
Total	93,699	100.00	36	93,415	100.00	36	72
Valid votes	93,699	98.11		93,415	97.94		
Invalid/blank votes	1,809	1.89		1,965	2.06		
Total votes	95,508	100.00		95,380	100.00		
Registered voters/turnout	211,426	45.17		211,426	45.11		

== November 2021 election ==
The following table shows the results of the 2021 election.

Party	Ward			List			Total seats
Party	Votes	%	Seats	Votes	%	Seats	Total seats
African National Congress	51,561	64.89	36	50,270	63.63	12	48
United Democratic Movement	10,795	13.59	0	12,887	16.31	11	11
Economic Freedom Fighters	5,515	6.94	0	5,533	7.00	5	5
African Transformation Movement	3,476	4.37	0	3,937	4.98	3	3
Independent candidates	4,326	5.44	1				1
Democratic Alliance	1,460	1.84	0	1,562	1.98	1	1
African Independent Congress	50	0.06	0	1,616	2.05	1	1
Civic Independent	441	0.56	0	938	1.19	1	1
Mthatha Ratepayers and Residents Association	555	0.70	0	811	1.03	1	1
Independent South African National Civic Organisation	748	0.94	0	603	0.76	1	1
Pan Africanist Congress of Azania	506	0.64	0	500	0.63	0	0
South African Security Organisation	21	0.03	0	200	0.25	0	0
God Save Africa				148	0.19	0	0
Total	79,454	100.00	37	79,005	100.00	36	73
Valid votes	79,454	97.74		79,005	97.03		
Invalid/blank votes	1,836	2.26		2,415	2.97		
Total votes	81,290	100.00		81,420	100.00		
Registered voters/turnout	206,563	39.35		206,563	39.42		

=== By-elections from November 2021 ===
The following by-elections were held to fill vacant ward seats in the period from November 2021. In ward seven, a by-election was held in October 2022 after the death of the previous councillor, with the African National Congress retaining its seat. The Economic Freedom Fighters, with 19%, took second spot from the United Democratic Movement, which dropped from 18% to 3%. Turnout was an exceptionally low 17%, with only 3% of registered voters in the Mthatha City district voting.

Date	Ward	Party of the previous councillor	Party of the newly elected councillor
26 October 2022	7	African National Congress	African National Congress
20 Aug 2025	6	African National Congress	African National Congress
