= Nyandeni Local Municipality elections =

== Results ==
The following table shows the composition of the council after past elections.

Event	ANC	DA	EFF	PAC	UDM	Other	Total
2000 election	31	—	—	1	13	—	45
2006 election	47	—	—	1	4	0	52
2011 election	53	2	—	0	4	2	61
2016 election	54	3	3	0	3	0	63
2021 election	51	1	4	0	2	6	64

== December 2000 election ==
The following table shows the results of the 2000 election.

Party	Ward			List			Total seats
Party	Votes	%	Seats	Votes	%	Seats	Total seats
African National Congress	30,899	69.39	22	30,860	69.41	9	31
United Democratic Movement	12,768	28.67	1	12,658	28.47	12	13
Pan Africanist Congress of Azania	865	1.94	0	943	2.12	1	1
Total	44,532	100.00	23	44,461	100.00	22	45
Valid votes	44,532	97.34		44,461	97.34		
Invalid/blank votes	1,219	2.66		1,217	2.66		
Total votes	45,751	100.00		45,678	100.00		
Registered voters/turnout	80,681	56.71		80,681	56.62		

== March 2006 election ==
The following table shows the results of the 2006 election.

Party	Ward			List			Total seats
Party	Votes	%	Seats	Votes	%	Seats	Total seats
African National Congress	54,300	89.81	26	57,304	90.06	21	47
United Democratic Movement	5,359	8.86	0	5,383	8.46	4	4
Pan Africanist Congress of Azania	498	0.82	0	619	0.97	1	1
United Independent Front	74	0.12	0	172	0.27	0	0
Independent Democrats	76	0.13	0	152	0.24	0	0
Independent candidates	112	0.19	0				0
United Christian Democratic Party	44	0.07	0				0
Total	60,463	100.00	26	63,630	100.00	26	52
Valid votes	60,463	97.69		63,630	98.48		
Invalid/blank votes	1,428	2.31		982	1.52		
Total votes	61,891	100.00		64,612	100.00		
Registered voters/turnout	108,512	57.04		108,512	59.54		

== May 2011 election ==
The following table shows the results of the 2011 election.

Party	Ward			List			Total seats
Party	Votes	%	Seats	Votes	%	Seats	Total seats
African National Congress	53,979	86.30	31	54,132	86.04	22	53
United Democratic Movement	4,766	7.62	0	4,293	6.82	4	4
Congress of the People	1,563	2.50	0	1,965	3.12	2	2
Democratic Alliance	1,293	2.07	0	1,851	2.94	2	2
Pan Africanist Congress of Azania	638	1.02	0	327	0.52	0	0
African People's Convention	82	0.13	0	344	0.55	0	0
Independent candidates	226	0.36	0				0
Total	62,547	100.00	31	62,912	100.00	30	61
Valid votes	62,547	97.74		62,912	98.36		
Invalid/blank votes	1,446	2.26		1,046	1.64		
Total votes	63,993	100.00		63,958	100.00		
Registered voters/turnout	118,639	53.94		118,639	53.91		

== August 2016 election ==
The following table shows the results of the 2016 election.

Party	Ward			List			Total seats
Party	Votes	%	Seats	Votes	%	Seats	Total seats
African National Congress	55,426	82.37	32	56,583	84.83	22	54
United Democratic Movement	3,394	5.04	0	3,911	5.86	3	3
Democratic Alliance	2,707	4.02	0	2,767	4.15	3	3
Economic Freedom Fighters	2,572	3.82	0	2,745	4.12	3	3
Independent candidates	2,815	4.18	0				0
United Party	264	0.39	0	377	0.57	0	0
Pan Africanist Congress of Azania	73	0.11	0	322	0.48	0	0
Congress of the People	40	0.06	0				0
Total	67,291	100.00	32	66,705	100.00	31	63
Valid votes	67,291	98.32		66,705	97.59		
Invalid/blank votes	1,147	1.68		1,644	2.41		
Total votes	68,438	100.00		68,349	100.00		
Registered voters/turnout	134,892	50.74		134,892	50.67		

== November 2021 election ==
The following table shows the results of the 2021 election.

Party	Ward			List			Total seats
Party	Votes	%	Seats	Votes	%	Seats	Total seats
African National Congress	43,442	77.94	32	44,398	79.64	19	51
African Transformation Movement	4,431	7.95	0	4,226	7.58	5	5
Economic Freedom Fighters	2,920	5.24	0	2,852	5.12	4	4
United Democratic Movement	875	1.57	0	1,910	3.43	2	2
Independent candidates	1,985	3.56	0				0
Democratic Alliance	913	1.64	0	832	1.49	1	1
Civic Independent	579	1.04	0	613	1.10	1	1
Pan Africanist Congress of Azania	209	0.37	0	396	0.71	0	0
Independent South African National Civic Organisation	157	0.28	0	257	0.46	0	0
Batho Pele Movement	176	0.32	0	154	0.28	0	0
Congress of the People	54	0.10	0	111	0.20	0	0
Total	55,741	100.00	32	55,749	100.00	32	64
Valid votes	55,741	97.86		55,749	97.90		
Invalid/blank votes	1,219	2.14		1,195	2.10		
Total votes	56,960	100.00		56,944	100.00		
Registered voters/turnout	134,601	42.32		134,601	42.31		
