= Mogalakwena Local Municipality elections =

The Mogalakwena Local Municipality is a Local Municipality in Limpopo, South Africa. The council consists of sixty-four members elected by mixed-member proportional representation. Thirty-two councillors are elected by first-past-the-post voting in thirty-two wards, while the remaining thirty-two are chosen from party lists so that the total number of party representatives is proportional to the number of votes received. In the election of 1 November 2021. The African National Congress (ANC) won a majority of 42 seats on the council.

== Results ==
The following table shows the composition of the council after past elections.

Event	ANC	APC	AZAPO	COPE	DA	EFF	FF+	PAC	Other	Total
2000 election	53	—	—	—	5	—	—	3	1	62
2006 election	55	—	0	—	3	—	1	1	3	63
2011 election	53	1	1	2	5	—	1	0	0	63
2016 election	41	0	1	1	6	13	1	0	1	64
2021 election	42	1	0	0	5	13	2	1	0	64

== December 2000 election ==
The following table shows the results of the 2000 election.

Party	Ward			List			Total seats
Party	Votes	%	Seats	Votes	%	Seats	Total seats
African National Congress	38,591	85.91	29	38,199	85.36	24	53
Democratic Alliance	3,169	7.05	2	3,511	7.85	3	5
Pan Africanist Congress of Azania	1,921	4.28	0	1,932	4.32	3	3
Inkatha Freedom Party	394	0.88	0	580	1.30	1	1
United Democratic Movement	244	0.54	0	526	1.18	0	0
Independent candidates	600	1.34	0				0
Total	44,919	100.00	31	44,748	100.00	31	62
Valid votes	44,919	97.48		44,748	97.32		
Invalid/blank votes	1,163	2.52		1,232	2.68		
Total votes	46,082	100.00		45,980	100.00		
Registered voters/turnout	115,694	39.83		115,694	39.74		

== March 2006 election ==
The following table shows the results of the 2006 election.

Party	Ward			List			Total seats
Party	Votes	%	Seats	Votes	%	Seats	Total seats
African National Congress	46,955	84.98	32	47,612	87.38	23	55
Democratic Alliance	2,147	3.89	0	2,480	4.55	3	3
Pan Africanist Congress of Azania	1,289	2.33	0	1,288	2.36	1	1
African Christian Democratic Party	970	1.76	0	987	1.81	1	1
Independent candidates	1,815	3.28	0				0
United Independent Front	775	1.40	0	689	1.26	1	1
Freedom Front Plus	687	1.24	0	580	1.06	1	1
United Democratic Movement	445	0.81	0	540	0.99	1	1
Azanian People's Organisation	174	0.31	0	313	0.57	0	0
Total	55,257	100.00	32	54,489	100.00	31	63
Valid votes	55,257	98.50		54,489	97.67		
Invalid/blank votes	843	1.50		1,301	2.33		
Total votes	56,100	100.00		55,790	100.00		
Registered voters/turnout	128,340	43.71		128,340	43.47		

== May 2011 election ==
The following table shows the results of the 2011 election.

Party	Ward			List			Total seats
Party	Votes	%	Seats	Votes	%	Seats	Total seats
African National Congress	52,245	76.06	31	56,644	84.20	22	53
Democratic Alliance	4,497	6.55	1	4,761	7.08	4	5
Independent candidates	6,920	10.07	0				0
Congress of the People	2,224	3.24	0	2,509	3.73	2	2
African People's Convention	575	0.84	0	962	1.43	1	1
Azanian People's Organisation	573	0.83	0	661	0.98	1	1
Freedom Front Plus	570	0.83	0	469	0.70	1	1
Pan Africanist Congress of Azania	401	0.58	0	478	0.71	0	0
African Christian Democratic Party	435	0.63	0	433	0.64	0	0
United Democratic Movement	226	0.33	0	251	0.37	0	0
National Freedom Party	20	0.03	0	104	0.15	0	0
Total	68,686	100.00	32	67,272	100.00	31	63
Valid votes	68,686	98.07		67,272	96.82		
Invalid/blank votes	1,353	1.93		2,213	3.18		
Total votes	70,039	100.00		69,485	100.00		
Registered voters/turnout	136,587	51.28		136,587	50.87		

== August 2016 election ==
The following table shows the results of the 2016 election.

Party	Ward			List			Total seats
Party	Votes	%	Seats	Votes	%	Seats	Total seats
African National Congress	43,467	62.80	30	44,356	64.20	11	41
Economic Freedom Fighters	13,487	19.49	0	13,960	20.20	13	13
Democratic Alliance	6,448	9.32	2	6,487	9.39	4	6
Freedom Front Plus	1,175	1.70	0	1,201	1.74	1	1
Mogalakwena Residents Association	1,110	1.60	0	1,096	1.59	1	1
Independent candidates	2,096	3.03	0				0
Azanian People's Organisation	453	0.65	0	394	0.57	1	1
Congress of the People	235	0.34	0	369	0.53	1	1
African Christian Democratic Party	253	0.37	0	332	0.48	0	0
African People's Convention	74	0.11	0	465	0.67	0	0
Pan Africanist Congress of Azania	199	0.29	0	184	0.27	0	0
United Christian Democratic Party	154	0.22	0	189	0.27	0	0
African People's Socialist Party	65	0.09	0	60	0.09	0	0
Total	69,216	100.00	32	69,093	100.00	32	64
Valid votes	69,216	98.38		69,093	98.12		
Invalid/blank votes	1,138	1.62		1,324	1.88		
Total votes	70,354	100.00		70,417	100.00		
Registered voters/turnout	144,031	48.85		144,031	48.89		

== November 2021 election ==
The following table shows the results of the 2021 election.

Party	Ward			List			Total seats
Party	Votes	%	Seats	Votes	%	Seats	Total seats
African National Congress	36,107	63.58	29	37,142	65.13	13	42
Economic Freedom Fighters	10,892	19.18	1	11,135	19.52	12	13
Democratic Alliance	4,237	7.46	2	4,192	7.35	3	5
Freedom Front Plus	1,269	2.23	0	1,284	2.25	2	2
Pan Africanist Congress of Azania	701	1.23	0	651	1.14	1	1
Independent candidates	1,341	2.36	0				0
African People's Convention	526	0.93	0	423	0.74	1	1
United Democratic Movement	323	0.57	0	423	0.74	0	0
African Transformation Movement	367	0.65	0	378	0.66	0	0
Azanian People's Organisation	313	0.55	0	316	0.55	0	0
African Christian Democratic Party	295	0.52	0	316	0.55	0	0
Mogalakwena Residents Association	125	0.22	0	477	0.84	0	0
Congress of the People	171	0.30	0	157	0.28	0	0
United Christian Democratic Party	124	0.22	0	137	0.24	0	0
Total	56,791	100.00	32	57,031	100.00	32	64
Valid votes	56,791	98.29		57,031	98.30		
Invalid/blank votes	990	1.71		985	1.70		
Total votes	57,781	100.00		58,016	100.00		
Registered voters/turnout	141,932	40.71		141,932	40.88		
