= Winnie Madikizela-Mandela Local Municipality elections =

The Winnie Madikizela-Mandela Local Municipality council (formerly the Bizana Local Municipality) consists of sixty-four members elected by mixed-member proportional representation. Thirty-two councillors are elected by first-past-the-post voting in thirty-two wards, while the remaining thirty-two are chosen from party lists so that the total number of party representatives is proportional to the number of votes received. In the election of 1 November 2021 the African National Congress (ANC) won a majority of forty-eight seats.

== Results ==
The following table shows the composition of the council after past elections.

Event	AIC	ANC	APC	DA	EFF	UDM	Other	Total
2000 election	—	36	—	—	—	6	0	42
2006 election	—	46	—	0	—	1	3	50
2011 election	1	54	1	1	—	1	3	61
2016 election	1	50	1	2	4	1	3	62
2021 election	1	48	0	1	4	1	9	64

== December 2000 election ==
The following table shows the results of the 2000 election.

Party	Ward			List			Total seats
Party	Votes	%	Seats	Votes	%	Seats	Total seats
African National Congress	24,515	81.50	20	26,736	85.84	16	36
United Democratic Movement	4,673	15.54	1	4,409	14.16	5	6
Independent candidates	892	2.97	0				0
Total	30,080	100.00	21	31,145	100.00	21	42
Valid votes	30,080	97.06		31,145	97.22		
Invalid/blank votes	912	2.94		890	2.78		
Total votes	30,992	100.00		32,035	100.00		
Registered voters/turnout	74,410	41.65		74,410	43.05		

== March 2006 election ==
The following table shows the results of the 2006 election.

Party	Ward			List			Total seats
Party	Votes	%	Seats	Votes	%	Seats	Total seats
African National Congress	52,928	89.37	23	55,831	94.81	23	46
Independent candidates	3,890	6.57	2				2
United Democratic Movement	1,156	1.95	0	1,555	2.64	1	1
Pan Africanist Congress of Azania	685	1.16	0	515	0.87	1	1
United Independent Front	237	0.40	0	338	0.57	0	0
African Christian Democratic Party	126	0.21	0	358	0.61	0	0
Democratic Alliance	156	0.26	0	289	0.49	0	0
Inkatha Freedom Party	46	0.08	0				0
Total	59,224	100.00	25	58,886	100.00	25	50
Valid votes	59,224	98.20		58,886	97.99		
Invalid/blank votes	1,084	1.80		1,210	2.01		
Total votes	60,308	100.00		60,096	100.00		
Registered voters/turnout	104,718	57.59		104,718	57.39		

== May 2011 election ==
The following table shows the results of the 2011 election.

Party	Ward			List			Total seats
Party	Votes	%	Seats	Votes	%	Seats	Total seats
African National Congress	48,363	74.32	31	53,971	86.03	23	54
Independent candidates	11,464	17.62	0				0
Congress of the People	1,716	2.64	0	2,202	3.51	2	2
Democratic Alliance	1,261	1.94	0	1,429	2.28	1	1
African Independent Congress	57	0.09	0	2,336	3.72	1	1
National Freedom Party	1,012	1.56	0	1,106	1.76	1	1
United Democratic Movement	320	0.49	0	629	1.00	1	1
African People's Convention	355	0.55	0	458	0.73	1	1
Pan Africanist Congress of Azania	345	0.53	0	294	0.47	0	0
African Christian Democratic Party	180	0.28	0	309	0.49	0	0
Total	65,073	100.00	31	62,734	100.00	30	61
Valid votes	65,073	97.19		62,734	95.11		
Invalid/blank votes	1,878	2.81		3,228	4.89		
Total votes	66,951	100.00		65,962	100.00		
Registered voters/turnout	116,717	57.36		116,717	56.51		

== August 2016 election ==
The following table shows the results of the 2016 election.

Party	Ward			List			Total seats
Party	Votes	%	Seats	Votes	%	Seats	Total seats
African National Congress	57,985	80.70	31	58,315	80.32	19	50
Economic Freedom Fighters	4,204	5.85	0	4,639	6.39	4	4
Academic Congress Union	2,958	4.12	0	2,845	3.92	3	3
Democratic Alliance	2,727	3.80	0	2,534	3.49	2	2
African Independent Congress	1,604	2.23	0	1,748	2.41	1	1
African People's Convention	1,059	1.47	0	969	1.33	1	1
United Democratic Movement	688	0.96	0	1,118	1.54	1	1
Abantu Democratic Revolution	157	0.22	0	220	0.30	0	0
Independent candidates	366	0.51	0				0
Pan Africanist Congress of Azania	108	0.15	0	218	0.30	0	0
Total	71,856	100.00	31	72,606	100.00	31	62
Valid votes	71,856	97.38		72,606	97.44		
Invalid/blank votes	1,934	2.62		1,907	2.56		
Total votes	73,790	100.00		74,513	100.00		
Registered voters/turnout	131,835	55.97		131,835	56.52		

== November 2021 election ==
The following table shows the results of the 2021 election.

Party	Ward			List			Total seats
Party	Votes	%	Seats	Votes	%	Seats	Total seats
African National Congress	45,160	73.74	32	45,302	74.42	16	48
African Transformation Movement	4,227	6.90	0	4,239	6.96	5	5
Economic Freedom Fighters	4,082	6.66	0	4,300	7.06	4	4
Socialist Party of South Africa	1,470	2.40	0	1,463	2.40	2	2
Democratic Alliance	1,070	1.75	0	1,125	1.85	1	1
Independent candidates	2,111	3.45	0				0
Academic Congress Union	980	1.60	0	988	1.62	1	1
United Democratic Movement	760	1.24	0	882	1.45	1	1
African Independent Congress	86	0.14	0	1,166	1.92	1	1
Socialist Revolutionary Workers Party	526	0.86	0	502	0.82	1	1
African People's Convention	471	0.77	0	457	0.75	0	0
Batho Pele Movement	243	0.40	0	229	0.38	0	0
Pan Africanist Congress of Azania	60	0.10	0	219	0.36	0	0
Total	61,246	100.00	32	60,872	100.00	32	64
Valid votes	61,246	98.27		60,872	97.94		
Invalid/blank votes	1,077	1.73		1,280	2.06		
Total votes	62,323	100.00		62,152	100.00		
Registered voters/turnout	133,323	46.75		133,323	46.62		

=== By-elections from November 2021 ===
The following by-elections were held to fill vacant ward seats in the period from the election in November 2021.

Date	Ward	Party of the previous councillor	Party of the newly elected councillor
18 Mar 2026	14	African National Congress	African National Congress
