= Albert Luthuli Local Municipality elections =

The Albert Luthuli Local Municipality is a Local Municipality in Mpumalanga in South Africa. The council consists of forty-nine members elected by mixed-member proportional representation. Twenty-five councillors are elected by first-past-the-post voting in twenty-five wards, while the remaining twenty-four are chosen from party lists so that the total number of party representatives is proportional to the number of votes received. In the election of 1 November 2021 the African National Congress (ANC) won a majority of thirty-eight seats.

== Results ==
The following table shows the composition of the council after past elections.

Event	ACDP	ANC	APC	DA	EFF	IFP	Other	Total
2000 election	1	39	—	3	—	1	0	44
2006 election	1	40	—	2	—	1	0	44
2011 election	0	44	—	3	—	—	2	49
2016 election	0	41	1	2	4	1	0	49
2021 election	—	38	1	1	8	1	0	49

== December 2000 election ==
The following table shows the results of the 2000 election.

Party	Ward			List			Total seats
Party	Votes	%	Seats	Votes	%	Seats	Total seats
African National Congress	29,711	87.67	22	30,425	88.47	17	39
Democratic Alliance	2,406	7.10	0	2,223	6.46	3	3
African Christian Democratic Party	1,032	3.05	0	864	2.51	1	1
Inkatha Freedom Party	349	1.03	0	877	2.55	1	1
Independent candidates	392	1.16	0				0
Total	33,890	100.00	22	34,389	100.00	22	44
Valid votes	33,890	95.69		34,389	96.95		
Invalid/blank votes	1,527	4.31		1,082	3.05		
Total votes	35,417	100.00		35,471	100.00		
Registered voters/turnout	72,382	48.93		72,382	49.01		

== March 2006 election ==
The following table shows the results of the 2006 election.

Party	Ward			List			Total seats
Party	Votes	%	Seats	Votes	%	Seats	Total seats
African National Congress	38,044	89.83	22	37,918	89.70	18	40
Democratic Alliance	2,057	4.86	0	2,064	4.88	2	2
African Christian Democratic Party	1,035	2.44	0	970	2.29	1	1
Inkatha Freedom Party	710	1.68	0	669	1.58	1	1
Freedom Front Plus	362	0.85	0	303	0.72	0	0
Pan Africanist Congress of Azania	145	0.34	0	350	0.83	0	0
Total	42,353	100.00	22	42,274	100.00	22	44
Valid votes	42,353	97.95		42,274	97.73		
Invalid/blank votes	887	2.05		983	2.27		
Total votes	43,240	100.00		43,257	100.00		
Registered voters/turnout	80,338	53.82		80,338	53.84		

== May 2011 election ==
The following table shows the results of the 2011 election.

Party	Ward			List			Total seats
Party	Votes	%	Seats	Votes	%	Seats	Total seats
African National Congress	42,676	89.88	25	43,291	90.78	19	44
Democratic Alliance	2,759	5.81	0	2,544	5.33	3	3
National Freedom Party	808	1.70	0	901	1.89	1	1
Congress of the People	454	0.96	0	426	0.89	1	1
African Christian Democratic Party	480	1.01	0	295	0.62	0	0
Freedom Front Plus	304	0.64	0	229	0.48	0	0
Total	47,481	100.00	25	47,686	100.00	24	49
Valid votes	47,481	97.96		47,686	98.38		
Invalid/blank votes	988	2.04		784	1.62		
Total votes	48,469	100.00		48,470	100.00		
Registered voters/turnout	83,153	58.29		83,153	58.29		

== August 2016 election ==
The following table shows the results of the 2016 election.

Party	Ward			List			Total seats
Party	Votes	%	Seats	Votes	%	Seats	Total seats
African National Congress	44,803	82.84	25	45,365	84.13	16	41
Economic Freedom Fighters	4,481	8.29	0	4,311	8.00	4	4
Democratic Alliance	1,717	3.17	0	1,990	3.69	2	2
African People's Convention	899	1.66	0	971	1.80	1	1
Inkatha Freedom Party	461	0.85	0	588	1.09	1	1
Independent candidates	939	1.74	0				0
Freedom Front Plus	244	0.45	0	219	0.41	0	0
Congress of the People	266	0.49	0	180	0.33	0	0
African Christian Democratic Party	159	0.29	0	153	0.28	0	0
Ubuntu Party	116	0.21	0	143	0.27	0	0
Total	54,085	100.00	25	53,920	100.00	24	49
Valid votes	54,085	98.57		53,920	98.49		
Invalid/blank votes	782	1.43		828	1.51		
Total votes	54,867	100.00		54,748	100.00		
Registered voters/turnout	92,592	59.26		92,592	59.13		

== November 2021 election ==
The following table shows the results of the 2021 election.

Party	Ward			List			Total seats
Party	Votes	%	Seats	Votes	%	Seats	Total seats
African National Congress	29,852	75.08	25	30,472	77.04	13	38
Economic Freedom Fighters	6,550	16.47	0	6,616	16.73	8	8
Democratic Alliance	1,030	2.59	0	1,098	2.78	1	1
Independent candidates	1,103	2.77	0				0
Inkatha Freedom Party	530	1.33	0	573	1.45	1	1
African People's Convention	274	0.69	0	274	0.69	1	1
Freedom Front Plus	278	0.70	0	247	0.62	0	0
African Transformation Movement	143	0.36	0	273	0.69	0	0
Total	39,760	100.00	25	39,553	100.00	24	49
Valid votes	39,760	98.09		39,553	98.05		
Invalid/blank votes	776	1.91		788	1.95		
Total votes	40,536	100.00		40,341	100.00		
Registered voters/turnout	92,803	43.68		92,803	43.47		

=== By-elections from November 2021 ===
The following by-elections were held to fill vacant ward seats in the period since November 2021.

Date	Ward	Party of the previous councillor	Party of the newly elected councillor
6 July 2022	83001003	African National Congress	African National Congress
