= Themba Godi =

South African politician

Nelson Themba Godi (born 10 August 1966) is a South African politician and a former member of the National Assembly. As deputy parliamentary leader of the Pan-Africanist Congress of Azania, he was suspended by PAC's president, Motsoko Pheko, in September 2006. He is the former chairperson of Parliament's key public accounts (Scopa) committee. He was born in Matsavana.

Godi continued to serve as deputy leader of the PAC until the floor-crossing period of 2007, when he left the party with the PAC seat and formed the African Peoples' Convention on 4 September 2007. He was joined by Mofihli Dikotsi, the PAC's Chief Whip in parliament, and two MPLs: Eastern Cape MPL Zingisa Mkabile and Gauteng MPL Malesela Ledwaba. Godi was the first MP to cross the floor during the window period.
