= Power of Africans Unity =

South African political party

- President: Julius Nsingwane
- Founded: 5 November 2016
- National Assembly seats: 0 / 400
- Provincial Legislatures: 0 / 430

Website
- twitter.com/of_africans

Power of Africans Unity (PAU) is a South African political party founded in November 2016 by former COPE and UDM member Julius Nsingwane.

The party launched in Kroonstad, and joined demonstrations calling for the removal of then-president Jacob Zuma.

== Election results ==
=== National elections ===
Election	Total votes	Share of vote	Seats	+/–	Government
2019	2,685	0.02%	0 / 400	–	extraparliamentary

=== Provincial elections ===
Election	Eastern Cape		Free State		Gauteng		Kwazulu-Natal		Limpopo		Mpumalanga		North-West		Northern Cape		Western Cape	
Election	%	Seats	%	Seats	%	Seats	%	Seats	%	Seats	%	Seats	%	Seats	%	Seats	%	Seats
2019	-	-	0.06%	0/30	0.01%	0/73	-	-	0.03%	0/49	-	-	-	-	-	-	-	-
