= Pan Africanist Movement =

Political party in South Africa

- Founded: 2008
- Split from: Pan Africanist Congress of Azania
- Ideology: Pan-africanism

The Pan Africanist Movement is a minor South African political party founded by Thami ka Plaatjie and others from a faction in the Pan Africanist Congress. After a year of in-fighting between supporters of Ka Plaatjie and PAC president Letlapa Mphahlele, the high court ruled that ka Plaatjie's faction could not organise under the name or colours of the Pan Africanist Congress, and a new party was formed to accommodate the Ka Plaatjie faction.

The party was routed in the 2009 elections and Ka Plaatjie resigned in December 2009, joining the African National Congress in 2010.

The party contested the 2014 elections, their share of the vote shrinking to 0.02%.

== Election results ==
=== National elections ===
Election	Votes	%	Seats
2009	5,426	0.03%	0
2014	3,815	0.02%	0

=== Municipal elections ===
Election	Votes	%
2016	1,736	0.00%
