= Afrika Mayibuye Movement =

Political party in South Africa

- Abbreviation: AMM
- President: Floyd Shivambu
- Founders: Floyd Shivambu
- Founded: 5 September 2025
- Split from: UMkhonto weSizwe Party
- Headquarters: Johannesburg, Gauteng
- Ideology: Pan-Africanism; Social justice; Economic emancipation
- Political position: Far-left
- Colours: Black
- Slogan: Unity, Land, and Economic Freedom

Website
- Official website

Afrika Mayibuye Movement (AMM) is a political party in South Africa founded in 2025 by politician Floyd Shivambu. The party was established to contest elections and address issues related to economic inequality, land reform, and governance.

== History ==
The Movement was launched in September 2025 following consultations led by Shivambu across South Africa. It released a founding manifesto, the "Afrika Mayibuye Restoration Manifesto," outlining policies on land redistribution, economic empowerment, and social justice.

In late 2025, the party held its first national convention, establishing its leadership structure and preparing for the 2026 local government elections.

== Organisation and leadership ==
Floyd Shivambu serves as president of the Afrika Mayibuye Movement. The party leadership includes deputy presidents, a secretary-general, and national chairpersons responsible for policy implementation and organisational direction.

=== Internal issues ===
Reports have indicated early resignations within the party, including deputy leadership changes, reflecting challenges in consolidating the organisation during its formative period.

== Ideology and policies ==
The party's manifesto emphasises addressing historical inequalities, promoting economic empowerment, and pursuing structural reforms. Media coverage describes the movement as positioning itself as an alternative to established parties and advocating for land reform, job creation, and social justice.

== Electoral participation ==
The Afrika Mayibuye Movement has declared its intention to contest the 2026 local government elections, aiming to secure municipal majorities and influence governance at the local level.
