= South African National Civics Organisation =

The South African National Civics Organisation or South African National Civic Organisation (SANCO) is an umbrella political organisation in South Africa. It was founded in March 1992 to coordinate among existing civic organisations, which had been central in the latter phases of the struggle against apartheid. At its founding conference, 2,000 organisations were represented. In practice, affiliate organisations retained a great deal of autonomy.

Primarily aligned to the African National Congress (ANC), SANCO played a high profile role in Track II initiatives during the negotiations to end apartheid, particularly with respect to the transformation of local government in South Africa. Although relations with the ANC were sometimes strained, the two organisations were close enough that until 2002 SANCO was commonly referred to as the "plus one" of the ANC's Tripartite Alliance, a term later avoided because civic activists felt it devalued SANCO. By 2001, it claimed to have over 4,000 local branches.

In 2020, a breakaway group was formed under the name Independent South African National Civic Organisation (ISANCO); it held its inaugural conference in 2021 and contested as a registered political party in the 2021 municipal elections.
