= 2000 South African municipal elections =

Municipal elections

- 5 December 2000

All seats to the municipalities of South Africa
- Turnout: 48,07% (▼0.93pp)
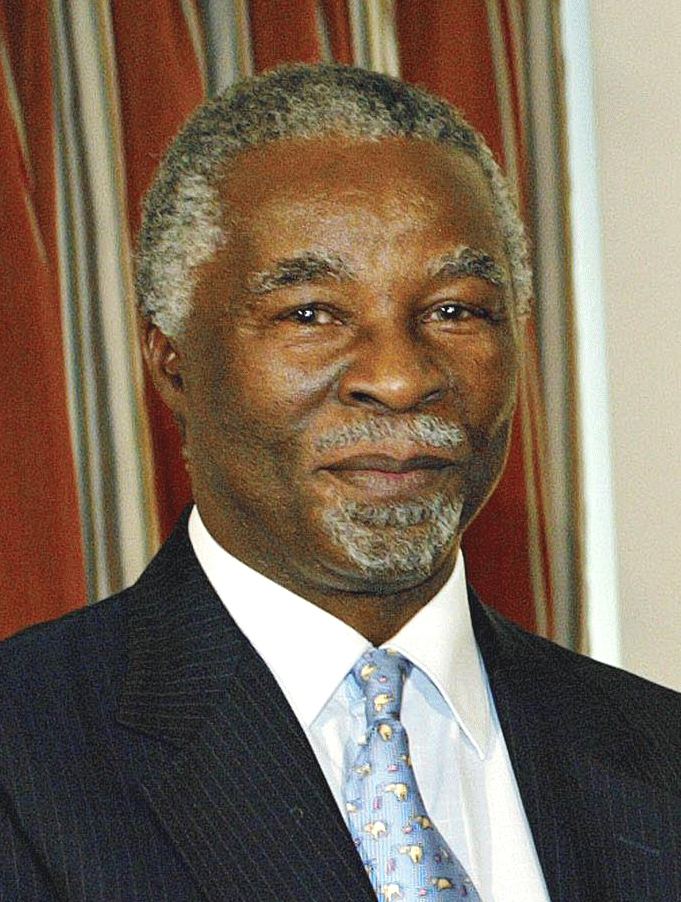

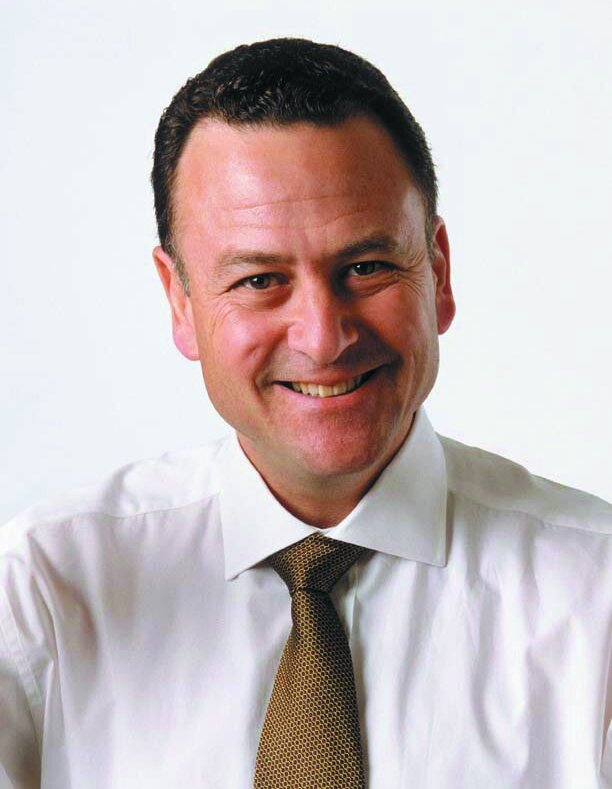

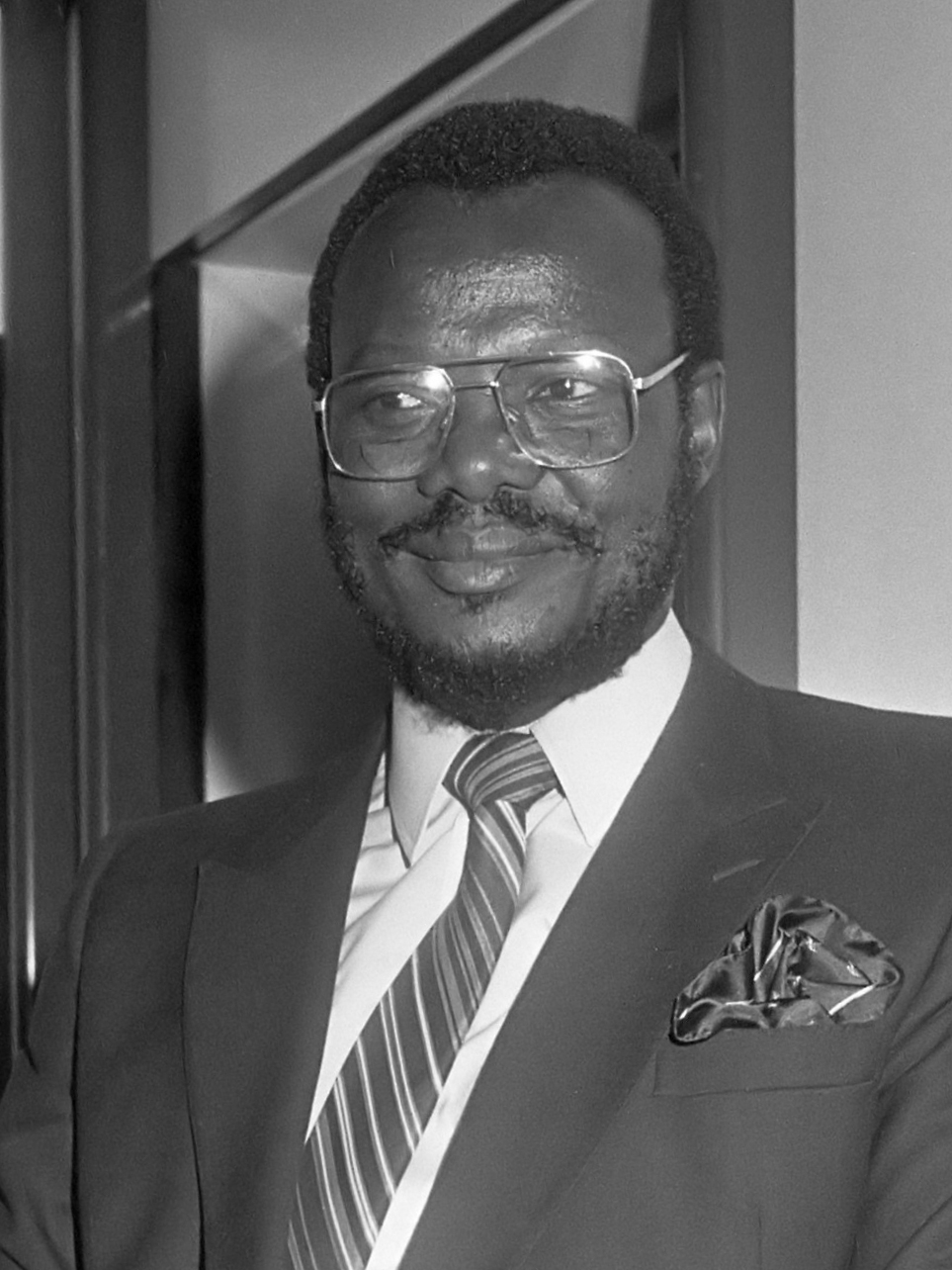
	First party	Second party	Third party
Leader	Thabo Mbeki	Tony Leon	Mangosuthu Buthelezi
Party	ANC	DA	IFP
Last election	58.0%	3.5%	8.7%
Popular vote	59.4%	22.1%	9.1%
Percentage	▲1.4%	▲18.6%	▲0.4%

Municipal elections were held in South Africa on 5 December 2000 to elect members to the local governing councils in the municipalities of South Africa.

== Background ==
The ruling African National Congress(ANC) had grown its support in the 1999 general election to 66.35% from 62.65% five years earlier. The New National Party(NNP), the successor to the National Party, had declined from being the largest opposition party to becoming the fourth largest party in the National Assembly while Tony Leon's Democratic Party(DP) had grown considerably to become the official opposition.

An agreement was reached between the NNP and DP to merge into a single political party where respective NNP and DP members would contest subsequent elections as candidates of the Democratic Alliance(DA).

== Results ==
The popular vote, obtained by adding the ward ballots and the municipal proportional representation ballots, were as follows:

Party	%
African National Congress	59.4%
Democratic Alliance	22.1%
Inkatha Freedom Party	9.1%
United Democratic Movement	2.6%
African Christian Democratic Party	1.3%
Pan Africanist Congress of Azania	1.2%
United Christian Democratic Party	1.0%
Minority Front	0.3%
Azanian People's Organisation	0.3%
Freedom Front	0.1%
Other parties	2.6%

=== Metropolitan Municipalities ===
The ANC won 5 of the 6 metros while the DA won one.

==== City of Cape Town ====
Out of 200 seats, the DA won a majority of 107 seats while the ANC won 77 seats. Six smaller parties won the remaining 16 seats.

==== City of Ekurhuleni ====
Out of 175 seats, the ANC won a majority of 99 seats while the DA won 55 seats. The remaining 21 seats were won by 10 parties.

==== City of Johannesburg ====
Out of 217 seats, the ANC won a majority of 128 seats while the DA won 73 seats. The remaining 16 seats were won by seven parties.

==== City of Tshwane ====
Out of 152 seats, the ANC won a majority of 86 seats while the DA won 54 seats. An independent candidate won a seat while seven political parties won the remaining 11 seats.

==== eThekwini ====
Out of 200 seats, the ANC won a plurality of 95 seats while the DA won 53 seats. The IFP won 35 seats, and an independent candidate won a seat. Six political parties won the remaining 17 seats.

==== Nelson Mandela Bay ====
Out of 108 seats, the ANC won a majority of 72 seats while the DA won 31 seats. The remaining five seats were won by four political parties.
