= African People's Convention =

Political party in South Africa

- Abbreviation: APC
- President: Themba Godi
- Founder: Themba Godi
- Founded: 5 September 2007
- Split from: Pan Africanist Congress of Azania
- Headquarters: 4th Floor, Dr. Neil Aggett House, 90 President Street, Johannesburg 2001
- Student wing: APCYL
- Ideology: Socialism; Pan-Africanism; African nationalism
- Political position: Left-wing
- Slogan: The Alternative Voice
- National Assembly seats: 0 / 400

Website
- www.theapc.org.za

The African People's Convention (APC) is a South African political party formed by Themba Godi, former deputy leader of the Pan-Africanist Congress of Azania (PAC) via floor-crossing legislation, on 4 September 2007. Godi defected along with the PAC's only two provincial representatives, Eastern Cape MPL Zingisa Mkabile and Gauteng MPL Malesela Ledwaba. Godi is the current leader of the APC. The party retained its seat in the National Assembly in the 2009 elections, although it lost both of its representatives in the provincial legislatures of Gauteng and Eastern Cape.

It retained its seat in the 2014 election, but lost it in the 2019 election.

Like the PAC, the party's ideology officially appeals to "Africanists, Pan Africanists and socialists".

== Election results ==
=== National Assembly elections ===
Election	Party leader	Total votes	Share of vote	Seats	+/–	Government
2007 Floor-crossing	Themba Godi	—	—	2 / 400	New	Opposition
2009	Themba Godi	35,867	0.20%	1 / 400	▼1	Opposition
2014	Themba Godi	30,676	0.17%	1 / 400	0	Opposition
2019	Themba Godi	19,593	0.11%	0 / 400	▼1	Extra-parliamentary
2024	Themba Godi	13,195	0.08% (Note: From 2024, seats in the National Assembly are determined by a combination of the national ballot, and the nine regional ballots. Only the national ballot figures are shown here.)	0 / 400	0	Extra-parliamentary

=== Provincial elections ===
Election	Eastern Cape		Free State		Gauteng		Kwazulu-Natal		Limpopo		Mpumalanga		North-West		Northern Cape		Western Cape	
Election	%	Seats	%	Seats	%	Seats	%	Seats	%	Seats	%	Seats	%	Seats	%	Seats	%	Seats
2009	0.20	0/63	0.31	0/30	0.12	0/73	0.15	0/80	0.30	0/49	0.37	0/30	0.29	0/33	0.34	0/30	0.09	0/42
2014	0.23	0/63	0.32	0/30	0.16	0/73	0.18	0/80	0.35	0/49	0.44	0/30	0.40	0/33	0.28	0/30	0.06	0/42
2019	0.13	0/63	0.15	0/30	0.07	0/73	0.10	0/80	0.36	0/49	0.34	0/30	0.13	0/33	0.15	0/30	0.04	0/42
2024	0.10	0/73	0.08	0/30	0.06	0/80			0.19	0/64	0.31	0/51	0.08	0/38				

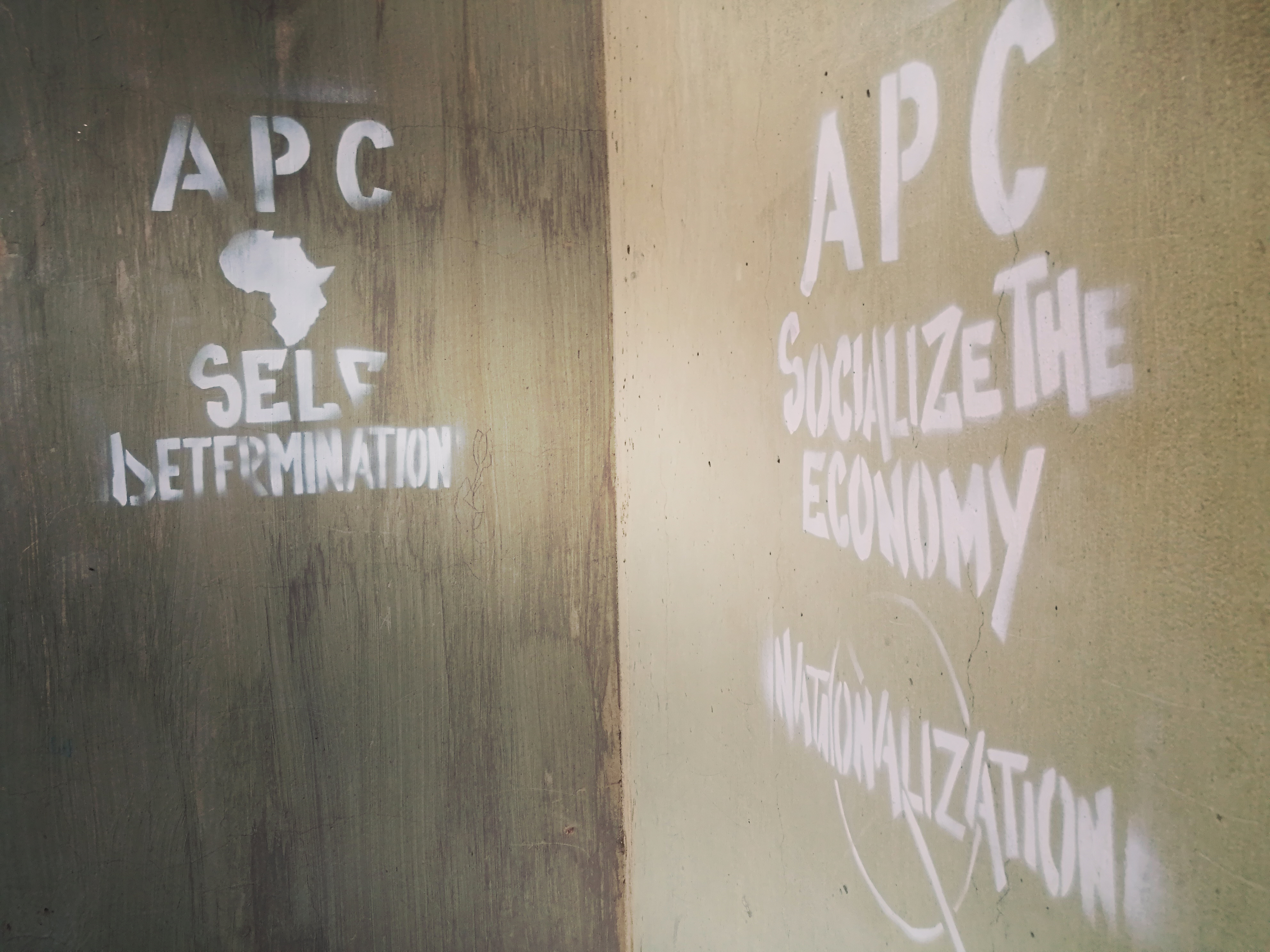
Slogan for APC in Pretoria

=== Municipal elections ===
Election	Votes	%
2016	84,579	0.22%
2021	58,358	0.19%
