= Results of the 2024 South African general election =

This article summarises the results of the 29 May 2024 South African general election, including both national ballot and regional ballot outcomes.

Several smaller parties received too few votes in the regional constituencies to secure a seat but received enough votes overall to win seats in the National Assembly (based on their allocation of compensatory seats).

== Results ==
Party	National ballot				Regional ballot				Total seats	+/–
Party	Votes	%	+/–	Seats	Votes	%	+/–	Seats	Total seats	+/–
African National Congress	6,459,683	40.18	–17.32	73	6,231,519	39.38	—	86	159	–71
Democratic Alliance	3,505,735	21.81	+1.04	42	3,439,272	21.74	—	45	87	+3
uMkhonto weSizwe	2,344,309	14.58	New	31	2,237,877	14.14	—	27	58	New
Economic Freedom Fighters	1,529,961	9.52	–1.28	17	1,556,965	9.84	—	22	39	–5
Inkatha Freedom Party	618,207	3.85	+0.47	8	688,570	4.35	—	9	17	+3
Patriotic Alliance	330,425	2.06	+2.02	5	345,880	2.19	—	4	9	+9
Freedom Front Plus	218,850	1.36	–1.02	4	234,477	1.48	—	2	6	–4
ActionSA	192,373	1.20	New	4	219,477	1.39	—	2	6	New
African Christian Democratic Party	96,575	0.60	–0.24	3	93,581	0.59	—	0	3	–1
United Democratic Movement	78,448	0.49	+0.04	2	85,618	0.54	—	1	3	+1
Rise Mzansi	67,975	0.42	New	1	70,142	0.44	—	1	2	New
Build One South Africa	65,912	0.41	New	2	69,020	0.44	—	0	2	New
African Transformation Movement	63,554	0.40	–0.04	2	66,831	0.42	—	0	2	0
Al Jama-ah	39,067	0.24	+0.06	2	53,337	0.34	—	0	2	+1
National Coloured Congress	37,422	0.23	New	1	47,178	0.30	—	1	2	New
Pan Africanist Congress of Azania	36,716	0.23	+0.04	1	40,788	0.26	—	0	1	0
United Africans Transformation	35,679	0.22	New	1	32,185	0.20	—	0	1	New
Good	29,501	0.18	–0.22	1	36,103	0.23	—	0	1	–1
#Hope4SA	27,206	0.17	New	0	16,872	0.11	—	0	0	New
Allied Movement for Change	22,055	0.14	New	0	18,393	0.12	—	0	0	New
United Independent Movement	20,003	0.12	New	0	18,907	0.12	—	0	0	New
African Independent Congress	19,900	0.12	–0.16	0	3,833	0.02	—	0	0	–2
National Freedom Party	19,397	0.12	–0.23	0	22,726	0.14	—	0	0	–2
Azanian People's Organisation	19,048	0.12	+0.05	0	18,741	0.12	—	0	0	0
African Congress for Transformation	18,354	0.11	New	0	348	0.00	—	0	0	New
African Heart Congress	16,306	0.10	New	0	3,579	0.02	—	0	0	New
Congress of the People	14,177	0.09	–0.18	0	16,768	0.11	—	0	0	–2
African People's Convention	13,195	0.08	–0.03	0	14,693	0.09	—	0	0	0
Africa Restoration Alliance	11,108	0.07	New	0	12,651	0.08	—	0	0	New
Forum for Service Delivery	11,077	0.07	+0.03	0	7,444	0.05	—	0	0	0
Democratic Liberal Congress	10,904	0.07	+0.01	0	7,022	0.04	—	0	0	0
Alliance of Citizens for Change	9,336	0.06	New	0	11,217	0.07	—	0	0	New
Action Alliance Development Party	7,802	0.05	New	0	4,600	0.03	—	0	0	New
Conservatives in Action	7,424	0.05	New	0	1,115	0.01	—	0	0	New
South African Royal Kingdoms Organisation	6,685	0.04	New	0	3,195	0.02	—	0	0	New
Northern Cape Communities Movement	6,629	0.04	New	0	7,016	0.04	—	0	0	New
People's Movement for Change	5,539	0.03	New	0	7,045	0.04	—	0	0	New
Abantu Batho Congress	5,531	0.03	New	0	3,552	0.02	—	0	0	New
Economic Liberators Forum	5,408	0.03	New	0	7,115	0.04	—	0	0	New
Organic Humanity Movement	5,241	0.03	New	0	6,457	0.04	—	0	0	New
African Content Movement	5,107	0.03	0.00	0	4,617	0.03	—	0	0	0
Sizwe Ummah Nation	5,016	0.03	New	0	4,869	0.03	—	0	0	New
South African Rainbow Alliance	4,796	0.03	New	0	7,645	0.05	—	0	0	New
African People's Movement	4,601	0.03	New	0	4,200	0.03	—	0	0	New
Able Leadership	3,867	0.02	New	0	3,161	0.02	—	0	0	New
Referendum Party	3,834	0.02	New	0	4,206	0.03	—	0	0	New
All Citizens Party	3,693	0.02	New	0	1,644	0.01	—	0	0	New
Africa Africans Reclaim	3,371	0.02	New	0	2,565	0.02	—	0	0	New
Citizans	2,992	0.02	New	0	4,084	0.03	—	0	0	New
Xiluva	2,592	0.02	New	0	1,167	0.01	—	0	0	New
African Movement Congress	2,141	0.01	New	0	1,550	0.01	—	0	0	New
Free Democrats	1,992	0.01	0.00	0	2,276	0.01	—	0	0	0
Independents					19,304	0.12		0	0	New
Total	16,076,719	100.00	–	200	15,823,397	100.00	–	200	400	0
Valid votes	16,076,719	98.69			15,823,397	99.02				
Invalid/blank votes	213,437	1.31			156,834	0.98				
Total votes	16,290,156	100.00			15,980,231	100.00				
Registered voters/turnout	27,782,081	58.64			27,782,081	57.52				
Source: Electoral Commission of South Africa, IOL

== National ballot ==
National ballot results by municipality

The ANC's swing by municipality.

Party	Votes	%	+/–	Seats
African National Congress	6,459,692	40.18	▼17.32	73
Democratic Alliance	3,506,864	21.81	▲1.04	42
uMkhonto weSizwe	2,344,311	14.58	New	31
Economic Freedom Fighters	1,529,963	9.52	▼1.28	17
Inkatha Freedom Party	618,209	3.85	▲0.47	8
Patriotic Alliance	330,425	2.06	▲2.02	5
Freedom Front Plus	219,053	1.36	▼1.02	4
ActionSA	192,372	1.20	New	4
African Christian Democratic Party	96,578	0.60	▼0.24	3
United Democratic Movement	78,446	0.49	▲0.04	2
Rise Mzansi	67,979	0.42	New	1
Build One South Africa	65,923	0.41	New	2
African Transformation Movement	63,554	0.40	▼0.04	2
Al Jama-ah	39,068	0.24	▲0.06	2
National Coloured Congress	37,423	0.23	New	1
Pan Africanist Congress of Azania	36,712	0.23	▲0.04	1
United Africans Transformation	35,679	0.22	New	1
GOOD	29,500	0.18	▼0.22	1
#Hope4SA	27,217	0.17	New	0
Allied Movement for Change	22,059	0.14	New	0
United Independent Movement	20,004	0.12	New	0
African Independent Congress	19,900	0.12	▼0.16	0
National Freedom Party	19,397	0.12	▼0.23	0
Azanian People's Organisation	19,048	0.12	▲0.05	0
African Congress for Transformation	18,354	0.11	New	0
African Heart Congress	16,307	0.10	New	0
Congress of the People	14,177	0.09	▼0.18	0
African People's Convention	13,195	0.08	▼0.03	0
Africa Restoration Alliance	11,108	0.07	New	0
Forum for Service Delivery	11,077	0.07	▲0.03	0
Democratic Liberal Congress	10,905	0.07	▲0.01	0
Alliance of Citizens for Change	9,333	0.06	New	0
Action Alliance Development Party	7,802	0.05	New	0
Conservatives in Action	7,424	0.05	New	0
South African Royal Kingdoms Organization	6,686	0.04	New	0
Northern Cape Communities Movement	6,629	0.04	New	0
People's Movement for Change	5,539	0.03	New	0
Abantu Batho Congress	5,531	0.03	New	0
Economic Liberators Forum	5,408	0.03	New	0
Organic Humanity Movement	5,240	0.03	New	0
African Content Movement	5,107	0.03	0.00	0
Sizwe Ummah Nation	5,016	0.03	New	0
South African Rainbow Alliance	4,796	0.03	New	0
African People's Movement	4,601	0.03	New	0
Able Leadership	3,867	0.02	New	0
Referendum Party	3,834	0.02	New	0
All Citizens Party	3,693	0.02	New	0
Africa Africans Reclaim	3,370	0.02	New	0
Citizans	2,992	0.02	New	0
Xiluva	2,593	0.02	New	0
African Movement Congress	2,141	0.01	New	0
Free Democrats	1,992	0.01	0.00	0
Total	16,078,093	100.00	–	200
Valid votes	16,078,093	98.69		
Invalid/blank votes	213,423	1.31		
Total votes	16,291,516	100.00		
Registered voters/turnout	27,782,081	58.64		
Source: Electoral Commission of South Africa

== Regional ballot ==
=== Nationwide ===
Party	Votes	%	Seats
African National Congress	6,239,067	39.34	86
Democratic Alliance	3,454,497	21.78	45
uMkhonto weSizwe	2,240,553	14.13	27
Economic Freedom Fighters	1,560,057	9.84	22
Inkatha Freedom Party	688,879	4.34	9
Patriotic Alliance	347,294	2.19	4
Freedom Front Plus	236,604	1.49	2
ActionSA	220,867	1.39	2
African Christian Democratic Party	93,882	0.59	0
United Democratic Movement	85,764	0.54	1
Rise Mzansi	70,549	0.44	1
Build One South Africa	69,490	0.44	0
African Transformation Movement	66,912	0.42	0
Al Jama-ah	53,404	0.34	0
National Coloured Congress	47,188	0.30	1
Pan Africanist Congress of Azania	40,832	0.26	–
Good	36,314	0.23	–
United Africans Transformation	32,269	0.20	–
National Freedom Party	22,746	0.14	–
United Independent Movement	18,787	0.12	–
Azanian People's Organisation	18,761	0.12	–
Allied Movement for Change	18,416	0.12	–
#Hope4SA	16,967	0.11	–
Congress of the People	16,791	0.11	–
African People's Convention	14,698	0.09	–
Africa Restoration Alliance	12,666	0.08	–
Alliance of Citizens for Change	11,236	0.07	–
Forum for Service Delivery	7,446	0.05	–
Economic Liberators Forum	7,161	0.05	–
People's Movement for Change	7,123	0.04	–
Democratic Liberal Congress	7,022	0.04	–
Northern Cape Communities Movement	7,016	0.04	–
Organic Humanity Movement	6,476	0.04	–
South African Rainbow Alliance	5,509	0.03	–
South African Royal Kingdoms Organization	5,352	0.03	–
Sizwe Ummah Nation	4,875	0.03	–
African Content Movement	4,617	0.03	–
Action Alliance Development Party	4,600	0.03	–
Referendum Party	4,206	0.03	–
African People's Movement	4,201	0.03	–
Citizans	4,089	0.03	–
African Independent Congress	3,844	0.02	–
African Heart Congress	3,594	0.02	–
Abantu Batho Congress	3,552	0.02	–
Able Leadership	2,921	0.02	–
Africa Africans Reclaim	2,574	0.02	–
Free Democrats	2,283	0.01	–
All Citizens Party	1,647	0.01	–
African Movement Congress	1,550	0.01	–
Xiluva	1,176	0.01	–
Conservatives in Action	1,124	0.01	–
African Congress for Transformation	348	0.00	–
Independents	19,304	0.12	–
Total	15,859,100	100.00	200
Valid votes	15,859,100	99.02	
Invalid/blank votes	156,703	0.98	
Total votes	16,015,803	100.00	
Registered voters/turnout	27,723,279	57.77	

=== Eastern Cape ===
Party	Votes	%	+/–	Seats	+/–
African National Congress	1,118,028	62.38	-6.88	16	–2
Democratic Alliance	266,919	14.89	-0.12	4	0
Economic Freedom Fighters	182,809	10.20	+2.48	3	+1
United Democratic Movement	63,606	3.55	+1.26	1	0
Patriotic Alliance	42,393	2.37	+2.35	1	+1
African Transformation Movement	28,115	1.57	+0.19	0	0
uMkhonto weSizwe	26,246	1.46	New	0	–
Pan Africanist Congress of Azania	9,496	0.53	+0.14	0	0
Freedom Front Plus	9,288	0.52	-0.36	0	0
ActionSA	8,588	0.48	New	0	New
African Christian Democratic Party	8,529	0.48	-0.01	0	0
Rise Mzansi	5,384	0.30	New	0	0
Build One South Africa	4,852	0.27	New	0	0
Azanian People's Organisation	2,807	0.16	+0.09	0	0
Congress of the People	2,184	0.12	-0.12	0	0
Alliance of Citizens for Change	1,964	0.11	New	0	New
African People's Convention	1,906	0.11	+0.01	0	0
GOOD	1,621	0.09	-0.13	0	0
Inkatha Freedom Party	1,519	0.08	+0.03	0	0
Al Jama-ah	1,458	0.08	+0.03	0	0
United Independent Movement	1,333	0.07	New	0	New
Organic Humanity Movement	570	0.03	New	0	New
Citizans	449	0.03	New	0	New
Sizwe Ummah Nation	344	0.02	New	0	New
Africa Restoration Alliance	321	0.02	New	0	New
South African Rainbow Alliance	310	0.02	New	0	New
Free Democrats	299	0.02	+0.01	0	0
Economic Liberators Forum	298	0.02	New	0	New
People's Movement for Change	283	0.02	New	0	New
Africa Africans Reclaim	233	0.01	New	0	New
Total	1,792,152	100.00	–	25	–
Valid votes	1,792,152	98.87			
Invalid/blank votes	20,442	1.13			
Total votes	1,812,594	100.00			
Registered voters/turnout	3,438,924	52.71			
Source: Electoral Commission of South Africa

=== Free State ===
Party	Votes	%	Seats	+/–
African National Congress	433,797	52.56	6	–2
Democratic Alliance	177,615	21.52	2	0
Economic Freedom Fighters	115,147	13.95	2	+1
Freedom Front Plus	25,544	3.10	0	–
uMkhonto weSizwe	18,514	2.24	0	New
Patriotic Alliance	11,838	1.43	0	–
African Transformation Movement	6,591	0.80	0	–
ActionSA	4,823	0.58	0	New
African Content Movement	4,617	0.56	0	–
African Christian Democratic Party	3,443	0.42	0	–
Build One South Africa	3,211	0.39	0	New
Rise Mzansi	2,406	0.29	0	New
#Hope4SA	2,231	0.27	0	–
Congress of the People	1,997	0.24	0	–
Pan Africanist Congress of Azania	1,814	0.22	0	–
Inkatha Freedom Party	1,686	0.20	0	–
United Africans Transformation	1,342	0.16	0	–
Azanian People's Organisation	1,333	0.16	0	–
United Independent Movement	1,170	0.14	0	New
United Democratic Movement	915	0.11	0	–
Alliance of Citizens for Change	904	0.11	0	New
African People's Convention	704	0.09	0	–
South African Royal Kingdoms Organization	556	0.07	0	New
Good	528	0.06	0	–
Abantu Batho Congress	419	0.05	0	New
Louis Petrus Liebenberg (Independent)	307	0.04	0	New
Economic Liberators Forum	305	0.04	0	New
Citizans	268	0.03	0	New
Organic Humanity Movement	238	0.03	0	–
National Freedom Party	201	0.02	0	–
South African Rainbow Alliance	195	0.02	0	New
Africa Restoration Alliance	185	0.02	0	New
African Movement Congress	180	0.02	0	New
Free Democrats	154	0.02	0	–
Sizwe Ummah Nation	104	0.01	0	New
Total	825,282	100.00	10	–
Valid votes	825,282	98.78		
Invalid/blank votes	10,206	1.22		
Total votes	835,488	100.00		
Registered voters/turnout	1,456,927	57.35		
Source: Electoral Commission

=== Gauteng ===
Party	Votes	%	Seats	+/–
African National Congress	1,359,773	34.55	17	–9
Democratic Alliance	1,071,728	27.23	13	+1
Economic Freedom Fighters	508,469	12.92	6	–1
uMkhonto weSizwe	384,499	9.77	5	New
ActionSA	159,657	4.06	2	New
Freedom Front Plus	97,294	2.47	1	–1
Patriotic Alliance	83,811	2.13	1	+1
Rise Mzansi	40,333	1.02	1	New
Inkatha Freedom Party	36,143	0.92	1	–
Build One South Africa	34,834	0.89	0	New
African Christian Democratic Party	29,413	0.75	0	–
Al Jama-ah	17,045	0.43	0	–
Pan Africanist Congress of Azania	13,014	0.33	0	–
African Transformation Movement	11,697	0.30	0	–
#Hope4SA	8,956	0.23	0	–
United Africans Transformation	8,934	0.23	0	–
United Democratic Movement	7,831	0.20	0	–
United Independent Movement	6,231	0.16	0	New
Good	5,780	0.15	0	–
Azanian People's Organisation	4,646	0.12	0	–
Allied Movement For Change	4,526	0.12	0	New
African Independent Congress	3,844	0.10	0	New
Anele Mda (Independent)	3,725	0.09	0	New
Congress of the People	3,602	0.09	0	–
African Heart Congress	3,594	0.09	0	New
South African Rainbow Alliance	2,791	0.07	0	New
African People's Convention	2,579	0.07	0	–
South African Royal Kingdoms Organization	2,149	0.05	0	New
Economic Liberators Forum	2,026	0.05	0	New
Organic Humanity Movement	1,777	0.05	0	–
Alliance of Citizens for Change	1,513	0.04	0	New
National Freedom Party	1,410	0.04	0	–
Africa Restoration Alliance	1,335	0.03	0	New
Xiluva	1,176	0.03	0	New
Conservatives in Action	1,124	0.03	0	New
Louis Petrus Liebenberg (Independent)	1,116	0.03	0	New
Lehlohonolo Blessings Answer Ramoba (Independent)	1,108	0.03	0	New
Sizwe Ummah Nation	1,072	0.03	0	New
Africa Africans Reclaim	1,041	0.03	0	New
All Citizens Party	961	0.02	0	New
Citizans	808	0.02	0	New
Able Leadership	728	0.02	0	New
People's Movement for Change	602	0.02	0	New
Free Democrats	489	0.01	0	–
Total	3,935,184	100.00	47	–
Valid votes	3,935,184	99.20		
Invalid/blank votes	31,825	0.80		
Total votes	3,967,009	100.00		
Registered voters/turnout	6,541,978	60.64		
Source: Electoral Commission of South Africa

=== Kwazulu-Natal ===
Party	Votes	%	Seats	+/–
uMkhonto weSizwe	1,574,202	44.91	19	New
Inkatha Freedom Party	640,683	18.28	8	+2
African National Congress	603,459	17.22	7	–17
Democratic Alliance	471,830	13.46	6	–
Economic Freedom Fighters	83,465	2.38	1	–3
National Freedom Party	20,716	0.59	0	–1
African Christian Democratic Party	11,593	0.33	0	–
ActionSA	10,455	0.30	0	New
Allied Movement for Change	8,676	0.25	0	New
Patriotic Alliance	7,587	0.22	0	–
Al Jama-ah	7,127	0.20	0	New
Democratic Liberal Congress	7,022	0.20	0	New
African Transformation Movement	6,577	0.19	0	–
Freedom Front Plus	5,620	0.16	0	–
Build One South Africa	4,856	0.14	0	New
African People’s Movement	4,201	0.12	0	New
Rise Mzansi	4,152	0.12	–	New
Pan Africanist Congress of Azania	3,338	0.10	0	–
Abantu Batho Congress	3,133	0.09	0	New
GOOD	2,868	0.08	0	–
Azanian People's Organisation	2,804	0.08	0	–
United Democratic Movement	2,796	0.08	0	–
Congress of the People	2,398	0.07	0	New
South African Royal Kingdoms Organization	2,145	0.06	0	New
United Independent Movement	2,114	0.06	0	New
Alliance of Citizens for Change	1,828	0.05	0	–
Sizwe Ummah Nation	1,472	0.04	0	New
African People's Convention	1,422	0.04	0	–
Citizans	1,161	0.03	0	New
African Movement Congress	1,149	0.03	0	New
Organic Humanity Movement	1,078	0.03	0	New
Africa Restoration Alliance	840	0.02	0	New
Economic Liberators Forum	721	0.02	0	New
Africa Africans Reclaim	643	0.02	0	New
People's Movement for Change	593	0.02	0	New
Free Democrats	407	0.01	0	New
Total	3,505,131	100.00	41	–
Valid votes	3,505,131	98.95		
Invalid/blank votes	37,086	1.05		
Total votes	3,542,217	100.00		
Registered voters/turnout	5,738,249	61.73		
Source: Electoral Commission of South Africa

=== Limpopo ===
Party	Votes	%	Seats	+/–
African National Congress	1,038,446	73.38	16	–
Economic Freedom Fighters	197,992	13.99	3	–
Democratic Alliance	84,161	5.95	1	–
Freedom Front Plus	16,145	1.14	–	–
uMkhonto weSizwe	12,295	0.87	–	New
United Africans Transformation	11,764	0.83	–	New
ActionSA	9,444	0.67	–	New
African Christian Democratic Party	4,806	0.34	–	–
Action Alliance Development Party	4,600	0.33	–	New
Build One South Africa	4,507	0.32	–	New
Pan Africanist Congress of Azania	3,075	0.22	–	–
Azanian People's Organisation	2,932	0.21	–	–
African People's Convention	2,787	0.20	–	New
Patriotic Alliance	2,527	0.18	–	–
Rise Mzansi	2,118	0.15	–	New
Congress of the People	2,042	0.14	–	–
Able Leadership	1,951	0.14	–	New
Economic Liberators Forum	1,800	0.13	–	New
Lehlohonolo Blessings Answer Ramoba (Independent)	1,574	0.11	–	New
Forum 4 Service Delivery	1,429	0.10	–	New
African Transformation Movement	1,206	0.09	–	–
United Democratic Movement	950	0.07	–	–
Alliance of Citizens for Change	919	0.06	–	New
Inkatha Freedom Party	902	0.06	–	–
All Citizens Party	686	0.05	–	–
South African Rainbow Alliance	670	0.05	–	New
United Independent Movement	600	0.04	–	New
Lovemore Nḓou (Independent)	522	0.04	–	New
Citizans	364	0.03	–	New
Good	302	0.02	–	–
Ntakadzeni Faith Phathela (Independent)	273	0.02	–	New
Africa Restoration Alliance	256	0.02	–	New
Al Jama-ah	243	0.02	–	–
Organic Humanity Movement	237	0.02	–	New
Africa Africans Reclaim	201	0.01	–	New
Sizwe Ummah Nation	138	0.01	–	New
Free Democrats	128	0.01	–	–
People's Movement for Change	124	0.01	–	New
Total	1,415,116	100.00	20	–
Valid votes	1,415,116	99.02		
Invalid/blank votes	13,957	0.98		
Total votes	1,429,073	100.00		
Registered voters/turnout	2,779,657	51.41		
Source: Electoral Commission of South Africa

=== Mpumalanga ===
Party	Votes	%	Seats	+/–
African National Congress	585,811	51.25	8	–4
uMkhonto weSizwe	191,869	16.79	3	New
Economic Freedom Fighters	160,425	14.04	2	–
Democratic Alliance	136,575	11.95	2	+1
Freedom Front Plus	18,136	1.59	–	-
ActionSA	5,990	0.52	–	New
African Christian Democratic Party	5,301	0.46	–	–
United Africans Transformation	5,587	0.49	–	New
Inkatha Freedom Party	4,912	0.43	–	–
African Transformation Movement	5,014	0.44	–	–
African People's Convention	3,551	0.31	–	–
Patriotic Alliance	3,153	0.28	–	–
Build One South Africa	2,762	0.24	–	New
Rise Mzansi	1,993	0.17	–	New
Azanian People's Organisation	1,548	0.14	–	–
Pan Africanist Congress of Azania	1,403	0.12	–	–
United Independent Movement	1,351	0.12	–	New
Alliance of Citizens for Change	999	0.09	–	New
Congress of the People	922	0.08	–	–
United Democratic Movement	855	0.07	–	–
Forum 4 Service Delivery	673	0.06	–	New
Economic Liberators Forum	565	0.05	–	–
South African Rainbow Alliance	551	0.05	–	New
Good	426	0.04	–	–
National Freedom Party	419	0.04	–	–
Citizans	393	0.03	–	–
People's Movement for Change	310	0.03	–	–
Organic Humanity Movement	296	0.03	–	–
Africa Restoration Alliance	263	0.02	–	New
Sizwe Ummah Nation	252	0.02	–	New
Able Leadership	242	0.02	–	New
Africa Africans Reclaim	230	0.02	–	New
Free Democrats	169	0.01	–	–
Total	1,142,946	100.00	15	–
Valid votes	1,142,946	98.88		
Invalid/blank votes	12,934	1.12		
Total votes	1,155,880	100.00		
Registered voters/turnout	2,025,070	57.08		
Source: Electoral Commission of South Africa

=== Northern Cape ===
Party	Votes	%	Seats	+/–
African National Congress	195,531	49.47	3	–
Democratic Alliance	82,767	20.94	1	–
Economic Freedom Fighters	52,314	13.23	1	–
Patriotic Alliance	33,994	8.60	0	–
Freedom Front Plus	7,650	1.94	0	-
Northern Cape Communities Movement	7,016	1.77	0	New
uMkhonto weSizwe	3,005	0.76	0	New
ActionSA	2,027	0.51	0	New
GOOD	1,870	0.47	0	–
#Hope4SA	1,672	0.42	0	New
African Christian Democratic Party	1,434	0.36	0	New
Build One South Africa	906	0.23	0	New
Congress of the People	785	0.20	0	–
Pan Africanist Congress of Azania	614	0.16	0	–
Azanian People's Organisation	602	0.15	0	–
Rise Mzansi	598	0.15	0	New
African Transformation Movement	412	0.10	0	–
Africa Restoration Alliance	397	0.10	0	New
Inkatha Freedom Party	268	0.07	0	–
United Independent Movement	260	0.07	0	New
Alliance of Citizens for Change	222	0.06	0	New
People's Movement for Change	167	0.04	0	New
United Democratic Movement	153	0.04	0	–
South African Royal Kingdoms Organization	136	0.03	0	New
South African Rainbow Alliance	123	0.03	0	New
Organic Humanity Movement	89	0.02	0	New
Citizans	85	0.02	0	New
Economic Liberators Forum	68	0.02	0	New
Sizwe Ummah Nation	67	0.02	0	New
Free Democrats	43	0.01	0	–
Total	395,275	100.00	5	–
Valid votes	395,275	98.89		
Invalid/blank votes	4,424	1.11		
Total votes	399,699	100.00		
Registered voters/turnout	656,826	60.85		
Source: Electoral Commission of South Africa

=== North West ===
Party	Votes	%	Seats	+/–
African National Congress	515,832	58.28	8	–1
Economic Freedom Fighters	153,496	17.34	3	+1
Democratic Alliance	114,629	12.95	2	–
Freedom Front Plus	24,487	2.77	0	–
uMkhonto weSizwe	18,176	2.05	0	–
ActionSA	13,871	1.57	0	–
Patriotic Alliance	8,055	0.91	0	–
Forum 4 Service Delivery	5,344	0.60	0	–
United Africans Transformation	4,642	0.52	0	–
Build One South Africa	3,828	0.43	0	–
African Christian Democratic Party	3,765	0.43	0	–
Rise Mzansi	3,169	0.36	0	–
United Democratic Movement	2,118	0.24	0	–
African Transformation Movement	1,366	0.15	0	–
Pan Africanist Congress of Azania	1,327	0.15	0	–
Azanian People's Organisation	1,309	0.15	0	–
Congress of the People	1,267	0.14	0	–
Inkatha Freedom Party	1,204	0.14	0	–
Economic Liberators Forum	1,090	0.12	0	–
United Independent Movement	788	0.09	0	–
Al Jama-ah	744	0.08	0	–
African People's Convention	691	0.08	0	–
Alliance of Citizens for Change	652	0.07	0	–
Africa Restoration Alliance	473	0.05	0	–
Good	466	0.05	0	–
Sizwe Ummah Nation	395	0.04	0	–
South African Royal Kingdoms Organization	366	0.04	0	–
South African Rainbow Alliance	325	0.04	0	–
Citizans	248	0.03	0	–
Organic Humanity Movement	231	0.03	0	–
Africa Africans Reclaim	226	0.03	0	–
African Movement Congress	221	0.02	0	–
Free Democrats	154	0.02	0	–
People's Movement for Change	129	0.01	0	–
Total	885,084	100.00	13	–
Valid votes	885,084	98.69		
Invalid/blank votes	11,792	1.31		
Total votes	896,876	100.00		
Registered voters/turnout	1,768,576	50.71		
Source: Electoral Commission of South Africa

=== Western Cape ===
Party	Votes	%	Seats	+/–
Democratic Alliance	1,048,273	53.40	14	–
African National Congress	388,390	19.79	5	–2
Patriotic Alliance	153,936	7.84	2	+2
Economic Freedom Fighters	105,940	5.40	1	–
National Coloured Congress	47,188	2.40	1	+1
Freedom Front Plus	32,440	1.65	1	–
Al Jama-ah	26,787	1.36	0	–
African Christian Democratic Party	25,598	1.30	0	–1
Good	22,453	1.14	–	–
uMkhonto weSizwe	11,747	0.60	–	–
Zackie Achmat (Independent)	10,679	0.54	–	–
Rise Mzansi	10,396	0.53	–	–
Build One South Africa	9,734	0.50	–	–
Africa Restoration Alliance	8,596	0.44	–	–
Pan Africanist Congress of Azania	6,751	0.34	–	–
United Democratic Movement	6,540	0.33	–	–
ActionSA	6,012	0.31	–	–
African Transformation Movement	5,934	0.30	–	–
Allied Movement for Change	5,214	0.27	–	–
United Independent Movement	4,940	0.25	–	–
People's Movement for Change	4,915	0.25	–	–
Referendum Party	4,206	0.21	–	–
#Hope4SA	4,108	0.21	–	–
Alliance of Citizens for Change	2,235	0.11	–	–
Organic Humanity Movement	1,960	0.10	–	–
Congress of the People	1,594	0.08	–	–
Inkatha Freedom Party	1,562	0.08	–	–
African People's Convention	1,058	0.05	–	–
Sizwe Ummah Nation	1,031	0.05	–	–
Azanian People's Organisation	780	0.04	–	–
South African Rainbow Alliance	544	0.03	–	–
Free Democrats	440	0.02	–	–
African Congress for Transformation	348	0.02	–	–
Citizans	313	0.02	–	–
Economic Liberators Forum	288	0.01	–	–
Total	1,962,930	100.00	24	–
Valid votes	1,962,930	99.29		
Invalid/blank votes	14,037	0.71		
Total votes	1,976,967	100.00		
Registered voters/turnout	3,317,072	59.60		
Source: Electoral Commission of South Africa

== Gallery ==
African National Congress performance by region in the 2024 South African general election.

The Democratic Alliance (South Africa) performance by region in the 2024 South African general election.

The uMkhonto we Sizwe (political party) performance by region.

The Economic Freedom Fighters performance by region in the 2024 South African general election.
