= Mangaung elections =

Local elections in South Africa

The Mangaung Metropolitan Municipality council consists of one hundred and one members elected by mixed-member proportional representation. Fifty-one councillors are elected by first-past-the-post voting in fifty-one wards, while the remaining fifty are chosen from party lists so that the total number of party representatives is proportional to the number of votes received.

== Results ==
The following table shows the composition of the council after past elections.

Event	ACDP	ANC	COPE	DA	EFF	FF+	PAC	PA	Other	Total
2000 election	1	60	—	18	—	—	2	—	5	86
2006 election	1	65	—	15	—	3	2	—	3	89
2011 election	0	65	3	26	—	2	0	—	1	97
2016 election	0	58	1	27	9	2	0	—	3	100
2021 election	1	51	0	26	12	5	—	2	4	101
2026 election	1	35	0	34	9	6	0	4	12	101

== December 2000 election ==
The following table shows the results of the 2000 election.

Mangaung local election, 5 December 2000
Party	Votes				Seats		
Party	Ward	List	Total	%	Ward	List	Total
African National Congress	108,544	109,437	217,981	69.7%	33	27	60
Democratic Alliance	32,088	32,656	64,744	20.7%	10	8	18
United Christian Democratic Party	3,810	4,289	8,099	2.6%	0	2	2
Pan Africanist Congress of Azania	3,478	3,305	6,783	2.2%	0	2	2
Alliance 2000+	2,116	2,114	4,230	1.4%	0	1	1
United Democratic Movement	1,491	1,605	3,096	1.0%	0	1	1
Azanian People's Organisation	1,451	1,561	3,012	1.0%	0	1	1
African Christian Democratic Party	859	1,733	2,592	0.8%	0	1	1
Independent candidates	2,389	–	2,389	0.8%	0	–	0
Total	156,226	156,700	312,926		43	43	86
Valid votes	156,226	156,700	312,926	98.2%			
Spoilt votes	2,943	2,631	5,574	1.8%			
Total votes cast	159,169	159,331	318,500				
Voter turnout	159,758						
Registered voters	314,428						
Turnout percentage	50.8%						

== March 2006 election ==
The following table shows the results of the 2006 election.

Mangaung local election, 1 March 2006
Party	Votes				Seats		
Party	Ward	List	Total	%	Ward	List	Total
African National Congress	106,801	108,483	215,284	71.5%	37	28	65
Democratic Alliance	24,349	24,098	48,447	16.1%	8	7	15
Freedom Front Plus	5,472	5,419	10,891	3.6%	0	3	3
United Christian Democratic Party	2,762	3,443	6,205	2.1%	0	2	2
Pan Africanist Congress of Azania	2,964	2,656	5,620	1.9%	0	2	2
Independent candidates	5,037	–	5,037	1.7%	0	–	0
African Christian Democratic Party	1,446	2,186	3,632	1.2%	0	1	1
Dikwankwetla Party of South Africa	925	846	1,771	0.6%	0	1	1
Independent Democrats	598	1,077	1,675	0.6%	0	0	0
Azanian People's Organisation	379	652	1,031	0.3%	0	0	0
Black Consciousness Forum	361	494	855	0.3%	0	0	0
United Democratic Movement	154	441	595	0.2%	0	0	0
Total	151,248	149,795	301,043		45	44	89
Valid votes	151,248	149,795	301,043	97.6%			
Spoilt votes	3,223	4,249	7,472	2.4%			
Total votes cast	154,471	154,044	308,515				
Voter turnout	154,947						
Registered voters	343,594						
Turnout percentage	45.1%						

== May 2011 election ==
The following table shows the results of the 2011 election.

Mangaung local election, 18 May 2011
Party	Votes				Seats		
Party	Ward	List	Total	%	Ward	List	Total
African National Congress	132,282	134,441	266,723	66.3%	38	27	65
Democratic Alliance	54,958	54,164	109,122	27.1%	11	15	26
Congress of the People	6,062	6,661	12,723	3.2%	0	3	3
Freedom Front Plus	3,247	2,826	6,073	1.5%	0	2	2
African People's Convention	786	1,113	1,899	0.5%	0	1	1
African Christian Democratic Party	585	1,123	1,708	0.4%	0	0	0
Independent candidates	1,191	–	1,191	0.3%	0	–	0
Dikwankwetla Party of South Africa	443	512	955	0.2%	0	0	0
Pan Africanist Congress of Azania	417	526	943	0.2%	0	0	0
United Residents Front	395	274	669	0.2%	0	0	0
Black Consciousness Party	182	300	482	0.1%	0	0	0
Total	200,548	201,940	402,488		49	48	97
Valid votes	200,548	201,940	402,488	98.6%			
Spoilt votes	3,146	2,597	5,743	1.4%			
Total votes cast	203,694	204,537	408,231				
Voter turnout	204,967						
Registered voters	372,692						
Turnout percentage	55.0%						

== August 2016 election ==
The following table shows the results of the 2016 election.

Mangaung local election, 3 August 2016
Party	Votes				Seats		
Party	Ward	List	Total	%	Ward	List	Total
African National Congress	135,351	135,294	270,645	56.5%	38	20	58
Democratic Alliance	61,874	62,449	124,323	26.0%	12	15	27
Economic Freedom Fighters	20,383	21,072	41,455	8.7%	0	9	9
Independent candidates	11,847	–	11,847	2.5%	0	–	0
Freedom Front Plus	4,776	4,411	9,187	1.9%	0	2	2
African Independent Congress	1,551	6,527	8,078	1.7%	0	2	2
Agency for New Agenda	507	3,753	4,260	0.9%	0	1	1
Congress of the People	1,508	1,343	2,851	0.6%	0	1	1
African Christian Democratic Party	941	925	1,866	0.4%	0	0	0
African People's Convention	416	584	1,000	0.2%	0	0	0
United Christian Democratic Party	276	678	954	0.2%	0	0	0
Botshabelo Unemployed Movement	216	288	504	0.1%	0	0	0
Dikwankwetla Party of South Africa	274	224	498	0.1%	0	0	0
Pan Africanist Congress of Azania	200	272	472	0.1%	0	0	0
Azanian Alliance Congress	137	299	436	0.1%	0	0	0
United Residents Front	225	211	436	0.1%	0	0	0
Total	240,482	238,330	478,812		50	50	100
Valid votes	240,482	238,330	478,812	98.1%			
Spoilt votes	4,037	5,215	9,252	1.9%			
Total votes cast	244,519	243,545	488,064				
Voter turnout	245,908						
Registered voters	425,211						
Turnout percentage	57.8%						

== November 2021 election ==
The following table shows the results of the 2021 election.

Mangaung local election, 1 November 2021
Party	Votes				Seats		
Party	Ward	List	Total	%	Ward	List	Total
African National Congress	87,100	90,672	177,772	50.6%	40	11	51
Democratic Alliance	45,482	44,857	90,339	25.7%	11	15	26
Economic Freedom Fighters	19,681	20,018	39,699	11.3%	0	12	12
Freedom Front Plus	7,970	7,771	15,741	4.5%	0	5	5
Patriotic Alliance	3,196	3,126	6,322	1.8%	0	2	2
Afrikan Alliance of Social Democrats	2,821	2,220	5,041	1.4%	0	2	2
African Independent Congress	2,970	1,484	4,454	1.3%	0	1	1
African Christian Democratic Party	1,292	1,224	2,516	0.7%	0	1	1
African Transformation Movement	1,018	1,071	2,089	0.6%	0	1	1
United Christian Democratic Party	658	675	1,333	0.4%	0	0	0
Independent candidates	992	–	992	0.3%	0	–	0
Congress of the People	276	534	810	0.2%	0	0	0
United Independent Movement	290	293	583	0.2%	0	0	0
African People's Convention	354	216	570	0.2%	0	0	0
Africa's New Dawn	241	236	477	0.1%	0	0	0
Botshabelo Unemployed Movement	208	244	452	0.1%	0	0	0
Forum for Service Delivery	124	288	412	0.1%	0	0	0
Mangaung Community Forum	27	366	393	0.1%	0	0	0
Agency for New Agenda	105	241	346	0.1%	0	0	0
United Residents Front	110	84	194	0.1%	0	0	0
The Organic Humanity Movement	109	73	182	0.1%	0	0	0
National Freedom Party	33	138	171	0.0%	0	0	0
International Party	2	140	142	0.0%	0	0	0
South African Royal Kingdoms Organization	18	55	73	0.0%	0	0	0
Total	175,077	176,026	351,103		51	50	101
Valid votes	175,077	176,026	351,103	98.4%			
Spoilt votes	2,850	2,736	5,586	1.6%			
Total votes cast	177,927	178,762	356,689				
Voter turnout	179,703						
Registered voters	410,785						
Turnout percentage	43.7%						

=== By-elections from November 2021 ===
The following by-elections were held to fill vacant ward seats in the period since the election in November 2021.

Date	Ward	Party of the previous councillor	Party of the newly elected councillor
19 Jul 2023	7	African National Congress	African National Congress
19 Jul 2023	29	African National Congress	African National Congress
19 Jul 2023	49	African National Congress	African National Congress
19 Jul 2023	50	African National Congress	African National Congress
29 Nov 2023	47	Democratic Alliance	Democratic Alliance
11 Sep 2024	18	Democratic Alliance	Democratic Alliance
11 Sep 2024	20	Democratic Alliance	Democratic Alliance
11 Sep 2024	22	Democratic Alliance	Democratic Alliance
11 Sep 2024	25	Democratic Alliance	Democratic Alliance

The African National Congress expelled eight councillors for supporting the election of a Democratic Alliance (DA) speaker. Four were ward councillors, necessitating by-elections, which were held on 19 July 2023. The expelled councillors formed the Mangaung 7 (M7) grouping, and ran as independents. The ANC won all four by-elections, to retain majority control of the council.

== November 2026 election ==
The following table shows the results of the 2026 election.

Party	Ward			List			Total seats
Party	Votes	%	Seats	Votes	%	Seats	Total seats
African National Congress	75,100	33.56	35	77,006	34.25	0	35
Democratic Alliance	74,671	33.37	14	75,554	33.61	20	34
Economic Freedom Fighters	18,966	8.47	1	19,587	8.71	8	9
Freedom Front Plus	13,300	5.94	0	13,270	5.90	6	6
Patriotic Alliance	9,912	4.43	1	9,557	4.25	3	4
ActionSA	5,597	2.50	0	6,605	2.94	3	3
South African Communist Party	3,802	1.70	0	3,257	1.45	2	2
National Service Delivery Forum	2,692	1.20	0	2,501	1.11	1	1
African Transformation Movement	1,994	0.89	0	2,158	0.96	1	1
African Cultural Identity Movement	2,078	0.93	0	1,920	0.85	1	1
uMkhonto weSizwe Party	1,973	0.88	0	1,953	0.87	1	1
Afrikan Alliance of Social Democrats	1,413	0.63	0	1,421	0.63	1	1
Mangaung Seven People's Voice	1,374	0.61	0	1,291	0.57	1	1
African Independent Congress	1,391	0.62	0	758	0.34	1	1
African Christian Democratic Party	1,023	0.46	0	1,098	0.49	1	1
African Congress for Transformation	832	0.37	0	867	0.39	0	0
Independent candidates	1,695	0.76	0				0
United Residents Front	635	0.28	0	542	0.24	0	0
Afrika Mayibuye Movement	615	0.27	0	522	0.23	0	0
African Heart Congress	582	0.26	0	539	0.24	0	0
Build One South Africa	481	0.21	0	584	0.26	0	0
Congress of the People	453	0.20	0	521	0.23	0	0
Pan Africanist Congress of Azania	519	0.23	0	454	0.20	0	0
African Alliance Congress	483	0.22	0	396	0.18	0	0
Active African Christians United Movement	405	0.18	0	355	0.16	0	0
United Africans Transformation	241	0.11	0	488	0.22	0	0
United Christian Democratic Party	335	0.15	0	344	0.15	0	0
African People's Convention	298	0.13	0	335	0.15	0	0
Labour Party of South Africa	267	0.12	0	319	0.14	0	0
Inkatha Freedom Party	294	0.13	0	224	0.10	0	0
Sizwe Ummah Nation	147	0.07	0	165	0.07	0	0
South African Royal Kingdoms Organization	128	0.06	0	143	0.06	0	0
People's Movement for Change	91	0.04	0	90	0.04	0	0
African Renaissance Unity	1	0.00	0				0
Total	223,788	100.00	51	224,824	100.00	50	101
Valid votes	223,788	98.03		224,824	97.98		
Invalid/blank votes	4,499	1.97		4,632	2.02		
Total votes	228,287	100.00		229,456	100.00		
Registered voters/turnout	447,397	51.03		447,397	51.29		
