= Electoral Amendment Act, 2023 =

South African election law

Parliament of South Africa
- Long title: Act to amend the Electoral Act, 1998, so as to delete a definition and insert certain definitions consequential to the expansion of this Act to include independent candidates as contesters to elections in the National Assembly and provincial legislatures; to provide that registered parties must submit a declaration confirming that all its candidates are registered to vote in the province where an election will take place; to provide that the submission of lists of candidates of a registered party not represented in the National Assembly or any provincial legislature, must be accompanied by a prescribed form with certain specified details; to provide for the nomination of independent candidates to contest elections in the National Assembly and provincial legislatures; to provide for the requirements which must be met by persons who wish to be nominated as independent candidates; to provide for the inspection of copies of lists of independent candidates and accompanying documents; to provide for objections to independent candidates; to provide for the inclusion of a list of independent candidates entitled to contest elections; to provide for the appointment of agents by independent candidates; to provide that independent candidates are bound by the Electoral Code of Conduct; to provide for the return of a deposit to independent candidates in certain circumstances; to amend Schedule 1; to substitute Schedule 1A; to provide for the Minister to establish the Electoral Reform Consultation Panel; and to provide for matters connected therewith.
- Citation: Act 1 of 2023
- Territorial extent: South Africa
- Passed by: National Assembly
- Passed: 20 October 2022
- Passed by: National Council of Provinces
- Passed: 29 November 2022
- Signed by: Cyril Ramaphosa
- Signed: 13 April 2023
- Commenced: 19 June 2023; 3 years ago

Legislative history

Initiating chamber: National Assembly
- Bill title: Electoral Amendment Bill
- Bill citation: B1-2022
- Introduced by: Aaron Motsoaledi, Minister of Home Affairs
- Introduced: 9 January 2022
- Passed: 20 October 2022
- Voting summary: 232 voted for; 98 voted against; 3 abstained

Revising chamber: National Council of Provinces
- Bill citation: B1B-2022
- Received from the National Assembly: 20 October 2022
- Passed: 29 November 2022

Final stages
- National Council of Provinces amendments considered by the National Assembly: 22 February 2023
- Voting summary: 218 voted for; 81 voted against
- Finally passed both chambers: 22 February 2023
- Status: In force

The Electoral Amendment Act, 2023 (Act 1 of 2023) is legislation aimed at reforming the electoral laws and regulations in South Africa. Its primary purpose is to address specific issues and challenges in the country's electoral process, ensuring that it is more inclusive, representative, and democratic.

== History ==
=== Origin ===
The South African Electoral Amendment Bill was first introduced in 2020, following concerns about the country's electoral system, particularly regarding the representation of smaller political parties as well as independent candidates. The bill was drafted in response to a 2019 Constitutional Court judgment, which declared certain aspects of the Electoral Act unconstitutional. The bill aims to address these issues and align the electoral laws with the country's Constitution.

On April 17, 2023, the President of South Africa, Cyril Ramaphosa, signed the bill into law. The law aims at expanding electoral participation and also widens the power of leadership choices for the national and provincial elections. This bill was passed in response to a Constitutional Court judgment that declared that the 1998 Electoral Act that was not constitutional for the stipulation that the election to the provincial legislatures and National Assembly can only be attained through the membership of the political parties.

=== Objectives ===
The South African Electoral Amendment Bill seeks to allow independent candidates to contest the national and provincial elections, introduce a more proportional representation system, enhance the independence and impartiality of the Electoral Commission, and improve the transparency and accountability of political party funding. It also seeks at strengthen electoral integrity and prevent fraud.

=== Electoral Reform Consultation Panel ===
Due to a lack of public participation in the course of preparing the legislation ahead of the 2024 South African general election a review clause was included in the legislation providing for the establishment of the Electoral Reform Consultation Panel to allow for a more comprehensive review of South Africa's electoral system. The Electoral Reform Consultation Panel's final report was tabled in Parliament on 18 September 2025.

== Formation ==
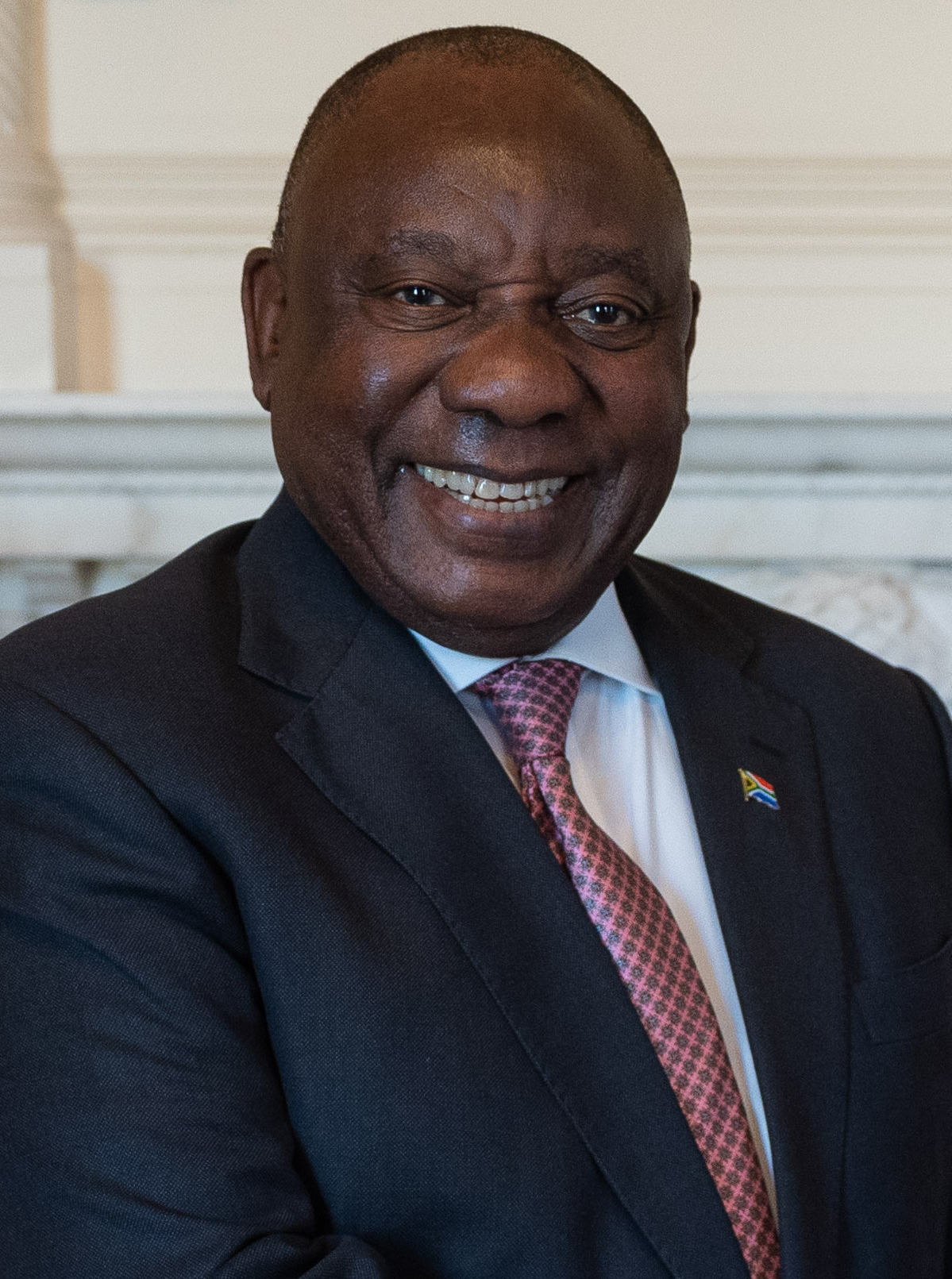
The President of South Africa, Cyril Ramaphosa, signed the bill in 2023

The bill was formed through a collaborative process involving the South African Parliament, political parties, civil society organizations, and citizens. The process included public hearings and consultations to gather input and feedback, expert analysis and research on electoral systems and best practices, drafting and refinement of the bill's provisions and language, as well as debate and voting in Parliament to approve or reject the bill.

The South African Electoral Amendment Bill was formed to address concerns about the underrepresentation of smaller political parties including independent candidates of the national and provincial legislatures, the need for a more proportional representation system to reflect the diversity of South African society, and the importance of ensuring the independence and impartiality of the Electoral Commission. Other concerns include the need for greater transparency and accountability in political party funding, the requirement to strengthen electoral integrity and prevent fraud, ensuring the trust and confidence of citizens in the electoral process.

== See also ==
- Parliament of South Africa
- National Assembly (South Africa)
- Constitutional Court of South Africa
