= Louis Liebenberg =

South African businessman accused of running a R4 billion diamond investment fraud

Louis Liebenberg (born 23 May 1964) is a South African businessman and diamond dealer. He is the alleged mastermind behind a R4 billion investment fraud operated through his companies Tariomix and Forever Diamonds and Gold. In October 2024, Liebenberg and eight co-accused were arrested by the Directorate for Priority Crime Investigation (Hawks) on charges of fraud, money laundering, theft, and racketeering.

Liebenberg is a known associate of former South African president Jacob Zuma, whom he supported financially during Zuma's legal battles. He stood as an independent candidate in the 2024 South African general election in the Free State and Gauteng.

== Background ==
Liebenberg operated in the South African diamond trade through two companies: Tariomix and its trading name Forever Diamonds and Gold. The alleged scheme involved advertising unpolished diamonds on social media and inviting public investment, with promises of high returns that investigators allege were never delivered.

The Hawks commenced their investigation into Tariomix in 2019. In 2021, Liebenberg's bank accounts were frozen over allegations of money laundering and operating a Ponzi scheme. He was acquitted of those charges in 2023. Tariomix was placed into liquidation on 11 April 2024.

== Arrest and charges ==
On 22 October 2024, Liebenberg and his wife Desiree (Dezzi) were arrested by Hawks officers at the Tonino restaurant at the Benoni Country Club in Gauteng. Six further suspects were arrested in Gauteng and North West on the same night, and a ninth on the following morning. The arrests followed a five-year investigation led by the Northern Cape Hawks' Serious Organised Crime Investigation Unit.

Co-accused included Liebenberg's former lawyer Walter Niedinger, Ronelle Kleynhans (co-director of Tariomix), Nicky van Heerden (his personal assistant), Helena Schulenburg (former office manager), and former company directors Hannes and Christelle Badenhorst.

The nine accused appeared at the Bronkhorstspruit Magistrate's Court on 24 October 2024. They face 42 counts of fraud, five counts of racketeering, six counts of money laundering, and various statutory offences including contraventions of the Companies Act.

=== Bail application ===
Liebenberg and his wife were the last of the nine accused to apply for bail, with the State opposing the application. The bail hearing was postponed to 15 November 2024. Liebenberg represented himself in the bail application. During his testimony, he presented himself as a philanthropist working to expand workers' access to South Africa's mineral resources.

== Political associations ==
Liebenberg had a documented relationship with former president Jacob Zuma. He gave Zuma cows as a gift in April 2023 and co-funded Zuma's private prosecution of prosecutor Billy Downer and journalist Karyn Maughan. Zuma has publicly described Liebenberg as "the definition of loyalty".

In the 2024 South African general election, Liebenberg stood as an independent candidate in the Free State and Gauteng.

== See also ==
- Jacob Zuma
- Directorate for Priority Crime Investigation
- uMkhonto weSizwe Party
- Diamond mining in South Africa
