= Vuyolwethu Zungula =

South African politician

Honourable Vuyolwethu Zungula MP

Member of the National Assembly of South Africa
- Incumbent
- Assumed office 22 May 2019

Personal details
- Born: Vuyolwethu Zungula Mthatha, South Africa
- Party: African Transformation Movement
- Education: Nelson Mandela University
- Occupation: Member of Parliament
- Profession: Politician

Vuyolwethu Zungula is a South African politician who was the president of the African Transformation Movement (ATM) from its formation until June 2025.

He and Thandiswa Marawu have been representing the ATM in the National Assembly of South Africa since 22 May 2019. Zungula was born in Mthatha and has a degree from Nelson Mandela University. At the time of the election, he was working towards an honours degree from the University of South Africa.

Following his replacement as president, Zungula continued as party leader in parliament.
