= 2024 South African general election =

- 29 May 2024

All 400 seats in the National Assembly 201 seats needed for a majority
- Registered: 27,782,081
- Turnout: 58.64% (▼7.41pp)
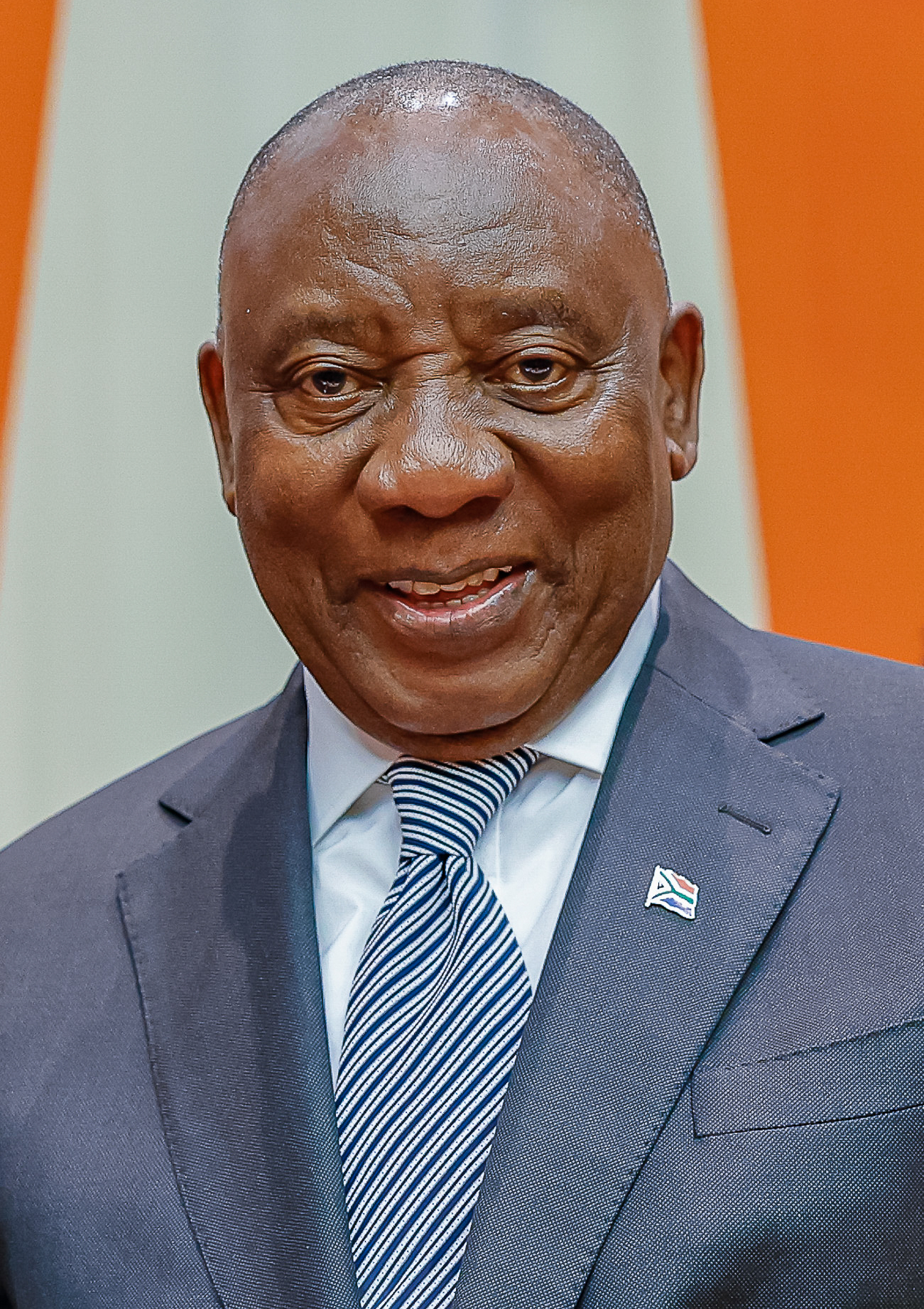

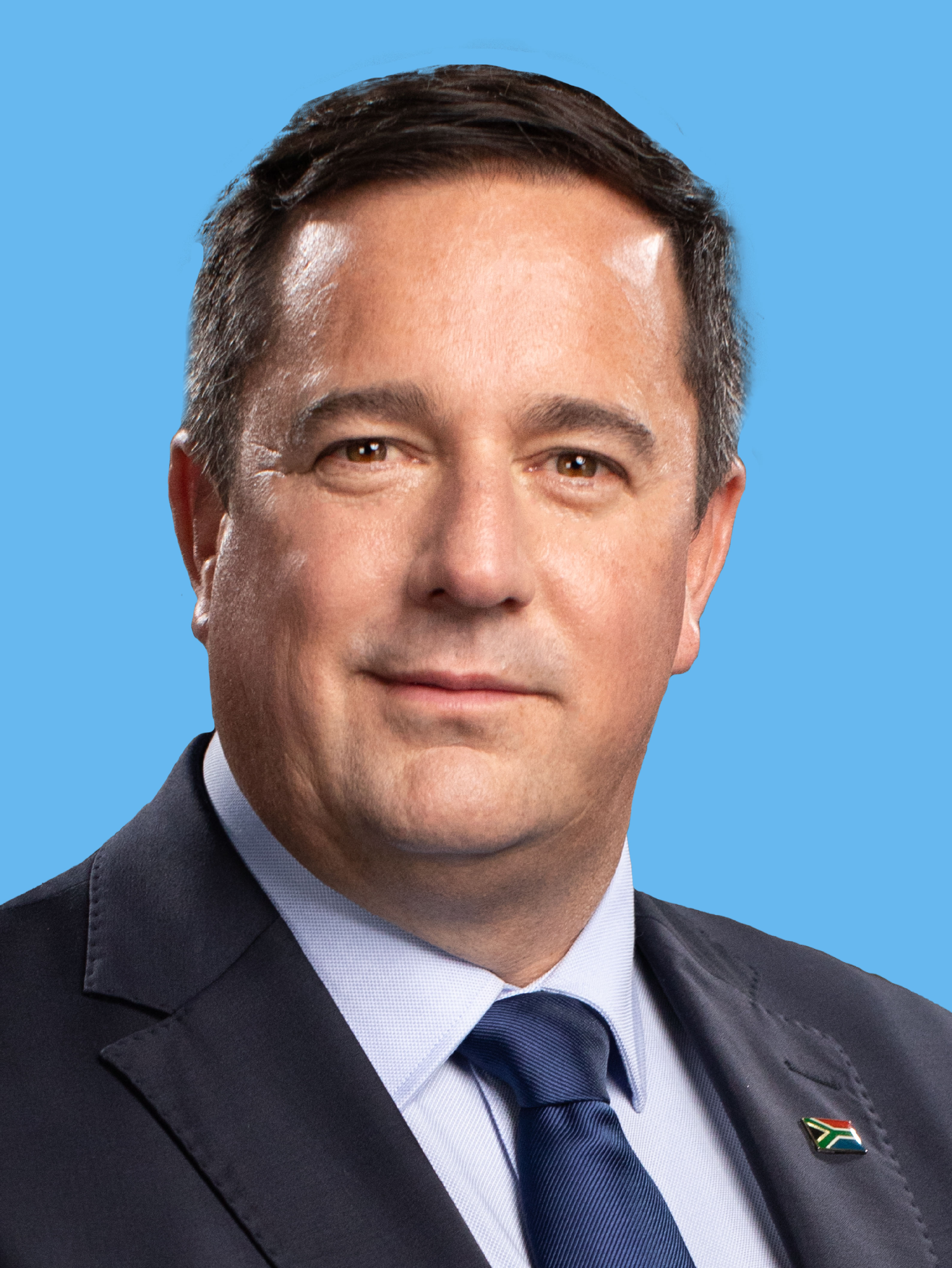

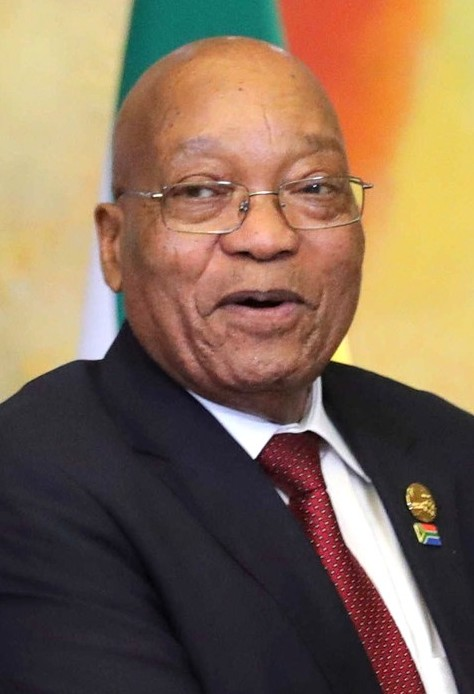

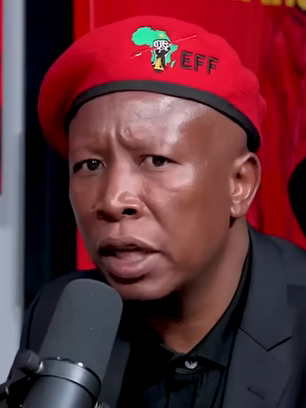

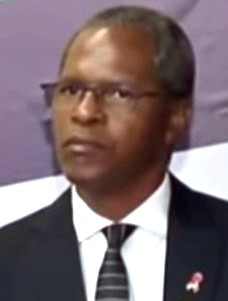

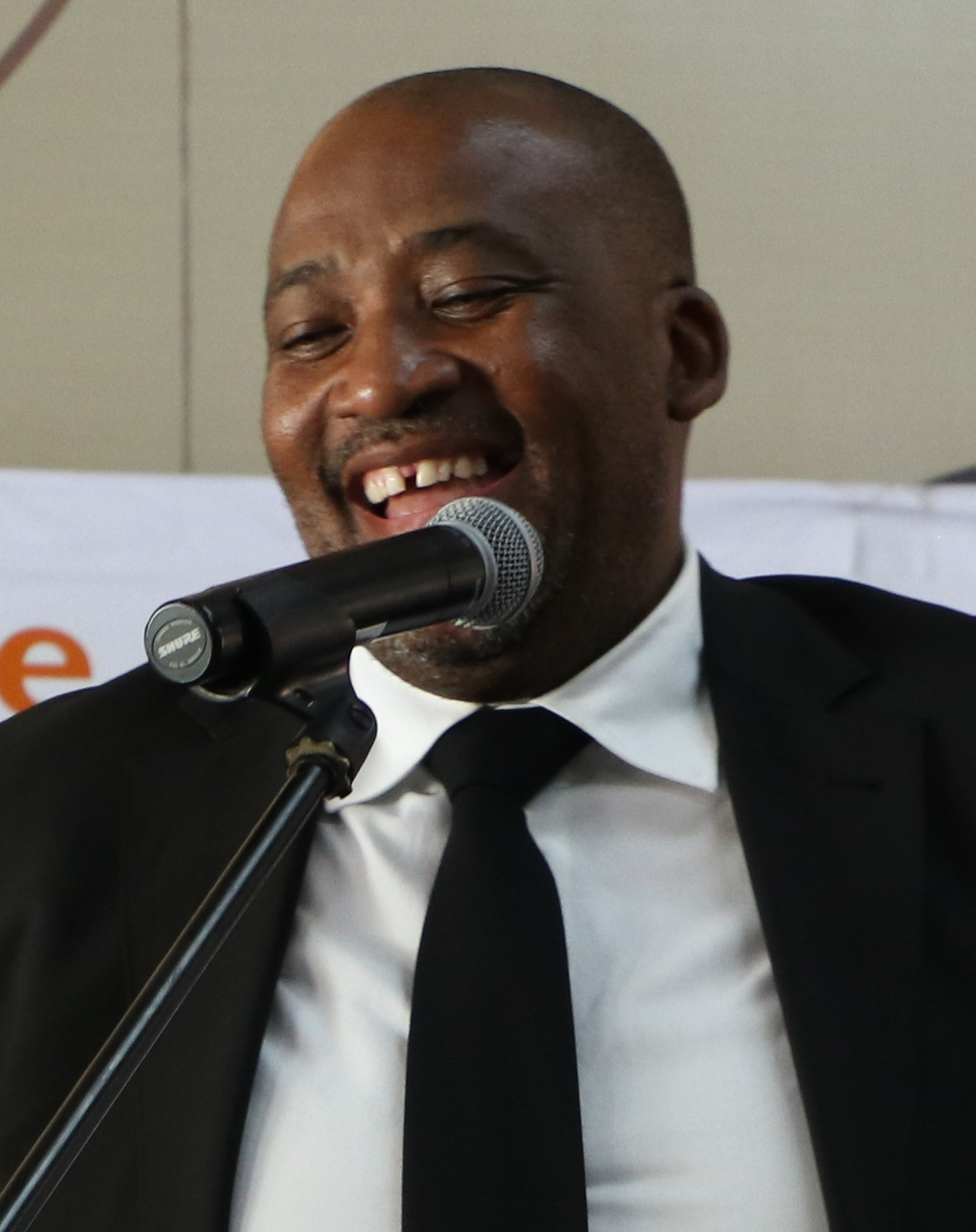
	First party	Second party	Third party
Leader	Cyril Ramaphosa	John Steenhuisen	Jacob Zuma (Note: Declared ineligible on 21 May 2024. However, he remained on the ballot papers.)
Party	ANC	DA	MK
Last election	57.50%, 230 seats	20.77%, 84 seats	Did not exist
Seats won	159	87	58
Seat change	▼71	▲3	New party
Popular vote	6,459,683	3,505,735	2,344,309
Percentage	40.18%	21.81%	14.58%
Swing	▼17.32pp	▲1.04pp	New party
	Fourth party	Fifth party	Sixth party
Leader	Julius Malema	Velenkosini Hlabisa	Gayton McKenzie
Party	EFF	IFP	PA
Last election	10.80%, 44 seats	3.38%, 14 seats	0.04%, 0 seats
Seats won	39	17	9
Seat change	▼5	▲3	▲9
Popular vote	1,529,961	618,207	330,425
Percentage	9.52%	3.85%	2.06%
Swing	▼1.28pp	▲0.47pp	▲2.02pp
Cabinet before election
Ramaphosa II
ANC-Good
Cabinet after election
Ramaphosa III
Government of National Unity (Note: ANC-DA-IFP-PA-VF+-UDM-RISE-Al Jama-ah-PAC-Good)

General elections were held in South Africa on 29 May 2024 to elect a new National Assembly as well as the provincial legislature in each of the nine provinces. This was the seventh general election held under the conditions of universal adult suffrage since the end of the apartheid era in 1994. The National Council of Provinces (NCOP), the upper house of the Parliament of South Africa, was elected by the provincial legislatures on 13 and 14 June after the general election.

Support for the ruling African National Congress (ANC) significantly declined in this election; the ANC remained the largest party but lost the parliamentary majority that it had held since the inaugural post-apartheid election in 1994. The Democratic Alliance (DA) remained in second place with a slight increase. uMkhonto we Sizwe (MK), a left-wing populist party founded 6 months prior to the election and led by former president Jacob Zuma, came in third place. Several smaller parties received too few votes in the regional constituencies to secure a seat but received enough votes overall to win seats in the National Assembly (based on their allocation of compensatory seats).

On 14 June 2024, the ANC, the DA, the Inkatha Freedom Party (IFP) and the Patriotic Alliance (PA), agreed to form a national unity government, with Cyril Ramaphosa being re-elected President of South Africa.

== Background ==
The election date of 29 May 2024 was declared by the incumbent president Cyril Ramaphosa on 20 February.

Going into the election, polls showed that support for the ANC was declining significantly, leading to expectations of a hung parliament. In the 2021 South African municipal elections, the African National Congress received less than 50% of the total vote for the first time since the end of apartheid, also losing support in the key metros of Tshwane (Pretoria), Johannesburg, Ekurhuleni, and eThekwini (Durban). The ANC retained control of eThekwini while the Democratic Alliance managed to take control of Johannesburg and Ekurhuleni through a majority coalition and a minority coalition respectively, in addition to forming a majority coalition government in Tshwane, which it had governed since 2016.

In early 2023, the ANC and Economic Freedom Fighters formed a coalition in Johannesburg and Ekurhuleni where the two parties held MMC positions whilst electing a mayor from a minority party. In April 2023, noting the prospects of an ANC/EFF national coalition, the DA leader John Steenhuisen called for "like-minded" parties to join to prevent a "doomsday coalition".

=== uMkhonto we Sizwe ===
On 16 December 2023, former president Jacob Zuma announced his departure from the ANC, accusing the party and incumbent president Cyril Ramaphosa of serving as a "proxy for white monopoly capital." He was also noted as calling the ANC "sellouts" and "apartheid collaborators". He also announced establishment of his own political party, uMkhonto we Sizwe (MK), named after the apartheid-era military wing of the ANC. The latter filed a lawsuit against the MK's registration in the Electoral Commission of South Africa, which was dismissed by the Electoral Court of South Africa on 26 March 2024 due to lack of merit. The ANC also plans to file a lawsuit against the party's naming after the historic MK. According to opinion polling, it was suggested that MK could become the kingmakers after the elections.

On 28 March 2024, the Electoral Commission barred Zuma from standing in the election, citing a previous criminal conviction. MK appealed the ruling, with Zuma's lawyers arguing that the conviction was of a civil nature, and the decision was overturned by the Electoral Court on 9 April, permitting Zuma to stand. On 12 April, the Electoral Commission announced that it would approach the Constitutional Court for clarity on section 47(1)(e) of the constitution, the provision used to uphold the initial objection against Zuma. On 30 April, police launched an investigation into whether the MK had forged signatures in order to be able to register for the election. On 20 May, Zuma was ruled ineligible to stand for the election by the Constitutional Court, citing his criminal conviction. He was still allowed to campaign for MK and his name was retained on the ballot as party leader.

=== Multi-Party Charter ===
A pre-election agreement called the Multi-Party Charter was signed between the Democratic Alliance (DA), Inkatha Freedom Party (IFP), Freedom Front Plus (FF Plus), ActionSA and three other parties with the aim of presenting a united front against the three-decade rule of the African National Congress (ANC) party and the rise of the Economic Freedom Fighters (EFF), uMkhonto we Sizwe (MK Party) and the Patriotic Alliance (PA). The Spectrum National Party, Ekhethu People's Party and the Unemployed National Party joined the MPC but failed to meet the Independent Electoral Commission's minimum number of signatures required to contest seats in the National Assembly. On 7 October 2023, the African Christian Democratic Party (ACDP) joined the charter. Going into the election, the MPC members represented 112 of the 400 seats in the National Assembly. During the 2024 election, the parties in the charter collectively won 119 of the 400 seats in the National Assembly, increasing the number of seats by seven. On 6 June 2024, ActionSA announced that they would leave the Multi-Party Charter. This decision reduced the charter's seat count from 119 to 113 in the 400-seat National Assembly.

=== Voter turnout ===
Voter turnout has declined since the end of apartheid, when 86% of eligible voters turned out. For this election, 27 million people were eligible to vote. Fifty-five percent of them were women, while voter registration was highest among those aged between 30 and 39 years old. Only 58% of the country's registered voters voted in the election.

== Electoral system ==
South Africa has a parliamentary system of government. The president of South Africa is unusual among heads of state of countries with a parliamentary system in that the head of government, who holds executive powers, is titled president and also plays the ceremonial role of head of state.

In June 2020, the Constitutional Court ruled in New Nation Movement NPC v President of the Republic of South Africa that the Electoral Act was unconstitutional to the extent that it did not allow independents to contest national and provincial elections. Since the first elections held under universal suffrage, 400 members elected were elected to the National Assembly by a system of proportional representation with a closed list approach. Two hundred members were elected from national party lists, while the other 200 were elected from provincial party lists in each of the nine provinces. The national list seats were awarded by subtracting seats won at the provincial level from each party's national allocation to generate a maximally proportional result. The Droop quota variant of the largest remainder method was used to allocate seats at both the national and provincial levels. Provincial legislatures were also elected by a system of proportional representation with closed party lists.

In February 2021, home affairs minister Aaron Motsoaledi appointed a ministerial advisory committee led by Valli Moosa to recommend a new electoral system. While the committee was divided in opinion, a slim majority of members favoured a mixed-member proportional system, with half of the seats elected in single-member constituencies and the other half elected from party lists in one national multi-member constituency. Due to dissatisfaction with the process surrounding the adoption of the Electoral Amendment Bill, a review clause was inserted into the Bill providing for the establishment of the Electoral Reform Consultation Panel. In August 2025, the Electoral Reform Consultation Panel issued its final report recommending reducing the size of constituencies to bring representatives closer to voters.

=== Regional ballot ===
The regional ballot is one of the two ballots used in South Africa's national elections, alongside the national ballot. Voters were also presented with a third ballot, a single ballot used for the election of members of the nine provincial legislatures, held on the same day. The regional ballot is used to elect representatives to the National Assembly from each of the country's nine provinces. The regional ballot is proportional, meaning that seats are allocated to parties and independent candidates based on the number of votes received.

National Assembly regional seats:

Region	Seats
Eastern Cape	25
Free State	10
Gauteng	47
KwaZulu-Natal	41
Limpopo	20
Mpumalanga	15
North West	13
Northern Cape	5
Western Cape	24
Total	200

=== Election of the National Assembly and provincial legislatures ===
On 17 April 2023, president Cyril Ramaphosa signed the South African Electoral Amendment Bill into law allowing independent candidates to stand for election to the National Assembly and provincial legislatures while keeping proportional representation with closed lists. Two hundred members will be elected from national party lists, while the remaining 200 seats will be contested by political parties and independent candidates in each of the nine provinces. In provincial legislatures, the single-tier multimember proportional system will continue to apply, with political parties and independent candidates contesting for seats. Voters will receive three ballot papers as opposed to two in previous elections; the first ballot will be to elect the 200 members of the National Assembly only contested by political parties; the second ballot will be to elect the remaining 200 members of the National Assembly, which will be contested by political parties and independent candidates in each of the nine provinces; and the third ballot will be to elect members of the provincial legislatures with political parties and independent candidates as well.

=== Election of the president and premiers ===
Following the election, the president of South Africa was elected by the National Assembly. Although the president is required to be a member of the National Assembly at the time of election, a person who is elected as president must resign their seat in order to assume office. The premiers of each province will also be elected by the respective provincial legislatures after the election.

=== NCOP elections ===
The National Council of Provinces (NCOP) comprises 90 members, ten of whom are elected by each of the provincial legislatures in proportion to the composition of the legislature. The NCOP members will be sworn in the day after the first sitting of the National Assembly.

== Parties and candidates ==
The election saw 70 political parties register, the highest number for a general election in South Africa. It is also the first general election to allow independent candidates to run for the National Assembly.

=== Preliminary candidate lists ===
On 26 March 2024, the Independent Electoral Commission published the preliminary candidate lists, listing the following fifty-two parties as having national candidates (as opposed to regional or provincial candidates): #Hope4SA, Abantu Batho Congress, Able Leadership, Action Alliance Development Party, ActionSA, Africa Africans Reclaim, African Christian Democratic Party, African Congress for Transformation, African Content Movement, African Heart Congress, African Independent Congress, African Movement Congress, African National Congress, African People's Convention, African People's Movement, African Transformation Movement, Al Jama-ah, All Citizens Party, Alliance of Citizens for Change, Allied Movement for Change (AM4C), Azanian People's Organisation, Build One South Africa with Mmusi Maimane, Citizens, Congress of the People, Conservatives in Action, Democratic Alliance, Democratic Liberal Congress, Economic Freedom Fighters, Economic Liberators Forum South Africa, Forum 4 Service Delivery, Free Democrats, Good, Independent South African National Civic Organisation, Inkatha Freedom Party, National Coloured Congress, National Freedom Party, Northern Cape Communities Movement, Organic Humanity Movement, Pan Africanist Congress of Azania, Patriotic Alliance, People's Movement for Change, Referendum Party, Rise Mzansi, Sizwe Ummah Nation, South African Rainbow Alliance, South African Royal Kingdoms Organization, uMkhonto weSizwe, United Africans Transformation, United Democratic Movement, United Independent Movement, Vryheidsfront Plus, and Xiluva.

=== Final candidate lists and independent candidates ===
On 10 April 2024, the Independent Electoral Commission published the final candidate lists, again listing fifty-two parties as having national compensatory candidates (as opposed to national regional and provincial). The Independent South African National Civic Organisation no longer appeared on the list, whereas the Africa Restoration Alliance was added. Six independent candidates appeared on the national regional lists, namely Zackie Achmat, Louis Liebenberg, Anele Mda, Lovemore N'dou, Ntakadzeni Phathela, and Lehlohonolo Ramoba.

== Campaign issues ==
=== Healthcare ===
On 15 May 2024, two weeks before the election, president Ramaphosa signed the National Health Insurance (NHI) Act into law, establishing a National Health Insurance state fund to provide more South Africans access to private healthcare. The goal of the bill is to eventually phase out the use of private healthcare, replacing it with the NHI as the sole purchaser and provider of health insurance. The DA is staunchly opposed to the bill on the premise that it could lead to large tax increases and corruption by ANC "cadre deployment," and have promised to challenge it in court.

The bill has been controversial because it would limit the ability for people to take out private health insurance to cover medical costs. Additionally, the government has not released official statistics regarding how much the NHI program would cost, raising concerns it could exacerbate South Africa's ongoing troubles providing public services such as electricity and water.

=== Illegal immigration ===
The South African public has blamed many socioeconomic problems on illegal immigration. Several parties such as ActionSA, IFP, ATM and PA, call for tighter border controls in response to the perceived strain caused by undocumented migrants on public services and resources. This is a widely popular stance, with the country having historically struggled with xenophobic vigilante violence (e.g. Operation Dudula).

=== Corruption ===
The Judicial Commission of Inquiry into Allegations of State Capture, known colloquially as the Zondo Commission, completed its work and submitted its final report to the president in June 2022. The Commission cost the South African taxpayer "almost R1 billion". Investigator Paul Holden of Shadow World Investigations read into evidence that state capture cost the South African economy at least R49 billion.

In their 2024 election manifesto, the African National Congress claims that, as per the Zondo Commission's recommendations, "laws, institutions and practices are being put in place to reduce the potential for corruption of any sort and on any scale". The Democratic Alliance puts the blame for corruption and state capture squarely on the shoulders of the ANC, saying that it will "establish a genuinely independent anti-crime and anti-corruption unit by dissolving the Hawks and establishing a new Chapter 9 institution, an Anti-Corruption Commission, which will only be accountable to the Parliament of South Africa." The Economic Freedom Fighters proposes to amend the Constitution to "make the National Prosecuting Authority a Chapter 9 institution accountable to Parliament".

The ANC was also criticized for provisionally including four ministers (Zizi Kodwa, Malusi Gigaba, David Mahlobo, and Gwede Mantashe) who were implicated in a corruption investigation into the administration of former president Jacob Zuma on 11 March, pending the final results of an intraparty review. Fourteen other officials were either disqualified or not listed as candidates by the ANC over the same issue.

=== Land reform ===
The ANC's proposed amendment of section 25 of the constitution of South Africa which failed in the Parliament of South Africa, by a vote of 204 MPs in favour, 145 MPs against and 0 abstentions. The bill required a two-thirds majority. The constitutionality of the amendment was also questioned by civil society organisations as it attempted to implement land expropriation without compensation. The ANC maintains that expropriation without compensation is necessary, as does the EFF. The DA, the Freedom Front Plus, the ACDP and the IFP remain opposed to the ANC's renewed attempt at expropriation through the Expropriation Amendment Bill.

Moves towards expropriation without compensation are largely framed as solutions to racial injustice. Reports from the South African government indicate that whites own 72% of total farms of agricultural holdings, while black South Africans are generally only responsible for between 5 and 10% of the country's agricultural output.

The ANC sees the current policy as a continuation of Nelson Mandela's promise to return 30% of the land to black South Africans. Currently, the ANC hopes to accomplish the goal by 2030. In their election manifesto, the ANC claims that they will "accelerate land reform and redistribution to reduce asset inequality and protect security of tenure, improve food security and agricultural production, promote rural and urban development and enable greater access to housing."

The EFF shares a similar stance to that of the ANC. In their manifesto, the EFF outlines seven pillars on which they are basing their policies. The first is explicitly in favor of expropriation, reading "expropriation of South Africa's land without compensation for equal redistribution in use." On the issue of expropriation, the EFF and ANC are mostly unified. Julius Malema, leader of the EFF, asserted that "when we say economic freedom, we mean Black people own productive farms."

The DA opposes the policy of expropriation without compensation and sees attempts at expropriation as violating section 25 of the Constitution. Section 25 states that land may only be expropriated with compensation if the expropriation is in the public interest. The party has called attempts to pass expropriation legislation "ruinous," an "assault on our constitutional values," and "archaic."

=== Energy crisis ===
Rolling blackouts, or "loadshedding", caused by problems with the state utility Eskom have been occurring since 2007, however the prevalence of blackouts has increased substantially since 2020. There is general dissatisfaction with the ANC's handling of the blackouts, with a 2023 survey finding that 24% of voters who had previously supported the ANC were planning to switch to other parties if the issue was not resolved.

The parties have taken varying stances on the issue. The ANC has pledged to create 12.5 million new jobs, a large portion of which will be devoted to a clean energy transition and modernisation of the nation's electrical system. The ANC has also linked the blackouts and energy crisis to environmental justice and climate change, claiming that its energy transition platform is also part of a larger transition to a cleaner economy. According to the ANC's election manifesto, the party pledges to "cultivate partnerships to expand domestic industries with significant potential to create sustainable jobs... such as energy." Additionally, the party views a clean energy transition as essential in solving the energy crisis. Part of this transition is moving away from the coal-based electrical grid that is currently facing loadshedding. That being said, the ANC has shown historical resistance to transitioning to new energy sources (i.e. renewables).

The DA largely blames the ANC for the energy crisis, saying that the state uses an "outdated" model of control and regulation. The DA intends to reduce government control over the energy sector if it is able to form a government. Using the Western Cape as a case study, the DA says it has a successful platform for energy solutions. They argue that recent contracts to build new solar plants in the area are indicative of this. Much of their energy platform has to do with deregulation and reducing taxes on private entities.

The EFF takes a Marxist and black nationalist approach to the issue. The party calls for the end of the privatization of Eskom, while calling for the involvement of the private sector in new electricity generation as part of efforts to shift control to the "majority of black people."

=== Crime ===
According to the South African Police Service Crime Statistics for Quarter 2 of the 2023–24 financial year, reported contact crimes (defined by SAPS as "crimes against the person") has increased by 3 391 (2.1%) compared to the previous year. Recorded attempted murder illustrated the highest increase year-on-year, with 12.3%. Total contact crimes reported for the quarter are 165,909. The murder rate correlates to 77 people murdered per day, while 160 cases of assault with intent to do grievous bodily harm are reported over the same period. Prior to the election, political violence was reportedly on the rise, especially in KwaZulu-Natal.

Action Society notes that "if the current murder trend continues, at least 31,000 people will be killed in the next 12 months...the [South African Government] has lost control..."

=== Housing ===
The lack of adequate housing has been a major issue. According to a report from Parliament, dated May 2022, the human settlements sector had a total of 3.4 million housing units built since 1994. The respective provinces and municipalities delivered a separate 1.3 million "serviced sites". A parliamentary question to the Minister of Human Settlements revealed there were 2,456,773 households registered on the National Housing Needs Register as of February 2023. In the City of Cape Town, there were 375,150 on the municipalities' Housing Needs Register.

In answer to a Parliamentary question to the Minister of Human Settlements on 24 March 2024, she stated that her department had built 245,587 houses in the five years between January 2019 and January 2024.

=== Cadre deployment ===
The ANC has practised a policy of employing people who are loyal to the ANC to positions within institutions of government. The Zondo Commission has found that cadre deployment played a significant part in corruption and went as far as to say that it is "illegal and unconstitutional".

On 12 February 2024, the Constitutional Court ruled that the ANC had five days to hand over their cadre deployment records to the Democratic Alliance dating back to 1 January 2013. Documents released by the DA so far contain a sworn affidavit from Thapelo Masilela, a Strategic Support Manager in the Office of the ANC Deputy Secretary General's Office which states that a laptop containing information in relation to the Deployment Committee had "crashed and...data which was stored on that hard drive had been lost". DA Leader John Steenhuisen responded in a press briefing on 23 February 2024 saying "the missing laptops, the missing minutes, President Cyril Ramaphosa WhatsApp's from his own personal devices are simply incongruent with the way in which the modern world works", showing that the party does not believe that the ANC has entirely complied with the order of the Constitutional Court.

=== Foreign policy ===
Cyril Ramaphosa said that South Africa v. Israel at the International Court of Justice (ICJ) may lead to foreign interference in the general election.

==== The African Growth & Opportunity Act ====
South Africa's links to Russia and China, through military co-operation and potential co-operation with Iran has placed the country in danger of losing its preferential access to the U.S. market through the African Growth and Opportunity Act, with multiple members of the U.S. Congress raising concern with South Africa's alleged threats to U.S. interests. In response, the Leader of the Opposition, John Steenhuisen led a delegation arguing that "the ANC is not South Africa" in an effort to lessen the risk of a possible removal from AGOA. Later, the Western Cape Premier, Alan Winde and a provincial delegation also made a trip to the United States to detail the possible impact that a loss would have on the agricultural industry in the province. The Leader of the Opposition in the Western Cape Provincial Parliament, Cameron Dugmore (ANC) accused the provincial government of wasting public funds, saying "this trip was about the DA's desperation to secure support for the 2024 elections by creating a certain narrative about this matter".

=== Cape independence ===
The Freedom Front Plus and the Referendum Party contested the election with Cape independence as part of their platform. The Referendum Party was formed in November 2023 as a single-issue political party aiming to pressure the Western Cape Democratic Alliance government into holding a referendum on Western Cape independence as part of any potential coalition agreement. The Cape Independence Party, which had contested in 2009 and 2019, did not make it on to the national ballot or the Western Cape provincial ballot, while the Referendum Party made it on to all three.

== Highly contested provinces ==
=== Gauteng ===
Gauteng is the most populated province and is the de facto economic hub of South Africa. In 2019 the ANC had barely retained the province, getting 50.19% of the vote. The DA hoped to win Gauteng with Solly Msimanga as their premier candidate. Funzi Ngobeni was ActionSA's premier candidate, while the ANC's candidate was current premier, Panyaza Lesufi.

The ANC lost its majority in Gauteng, claiming under 35% of the vote, followed by the DA with just over 28%.

=== KwaZulu-Natal ===
KwaZulu-Natal is the second most populated province and is home to the busiest port in southern Africa. Recent polling had the new MK Party leading in the province, having grown substantially at the expense of ANC support. Christopher Pappas was the premier candidate for the DA, while Thami Ntuli was the IFP's candidate. The ANC's premier candidate was Sbongiseni Duma. MK took 45.9% of the vote, leaving the ANC with only 17.6%, the DA not far behind.

=== Western Cape ===
As of April 2024, the Western Cape was the only province not to be controlled by the ANC. The DA, which has controlled the province since 2009, looked to retain the province with Premier Alan Winde as their premier candidate.

The DA retained control of the Western Cape with a 53% majority.

== Incidents ==
=== DA campaign video ===
In May 2024, the DA released a campaign video attacking the ANC and showing a South African flag on fire, saying that the same fate would befall the country should the ANC remain in power. The flag appears restored in the final seven seconds of the advert. DA leader John Steenhuisen described the video as "the most successful political advertisement in our democratic history," saying that it was seen by at least four million people online and heard by "millions more" in other media. President and ANC leader Cyril Ramaphosa called the ad "despicable" and "treasonous", while the public broadcaster SABC announced that it would not air the video, saying that it would only fuel "outrage", and called on the DA to amend the advert. Several analysts and organisations have noted that, although in "poor taste", the burning of the flag is protected under Section 16 of the Constitution as a freedom of expression.

The Complaints and Compliance Committee of the Independent Communications Authority of South Africa ruled on 24 May that the SABC be directed to desist from not airing the advert and pay a R500,000 fine within seven days.

=== National Health Insurance ===
President Cyril Ramaphosa announced on 13 May that he would sign the controversial National Health Insurance Bill into law on 15 May. Civil society organisations, including the South African Medical Association, Business Unity South Africa, Business Leadership South Africa, Solidariteit, the SA Institute of Race Relations and the South African Health Professionals Collaboration have expressed dissatisfaction at this announcement, some hinting at possible legal challenges to the legislation following the president's assent. The DA announced that it had briefed its legal team to file court papers at the Constitutional Court on the matter. ActionSA expressed its disappointment on the president's announcement, having previously urged the President not to sign the Bill.

=== Jacob Zuma ===
Former President Jacob Zuma founded the uMkhonto we Sizwe (MK Party) in December 2023, intending to contest the election. On 20 May 2024, the Constitutional Court of South Africa ruled that Zuma is ineligible to run in the parliamentary election due to his 2021 jail sentence.

=== Presidential Address to the Nation ===
On 26 May, the Presidency announced that Cyril Ramaphosa would address the nation at 6pm. In his address, broadcast by the SABC, he listed the achievements of his government. The address was criticised by opposition parties as an abuse of government resources for electioneering in favour of the ruling party.

== Opinion polls ==
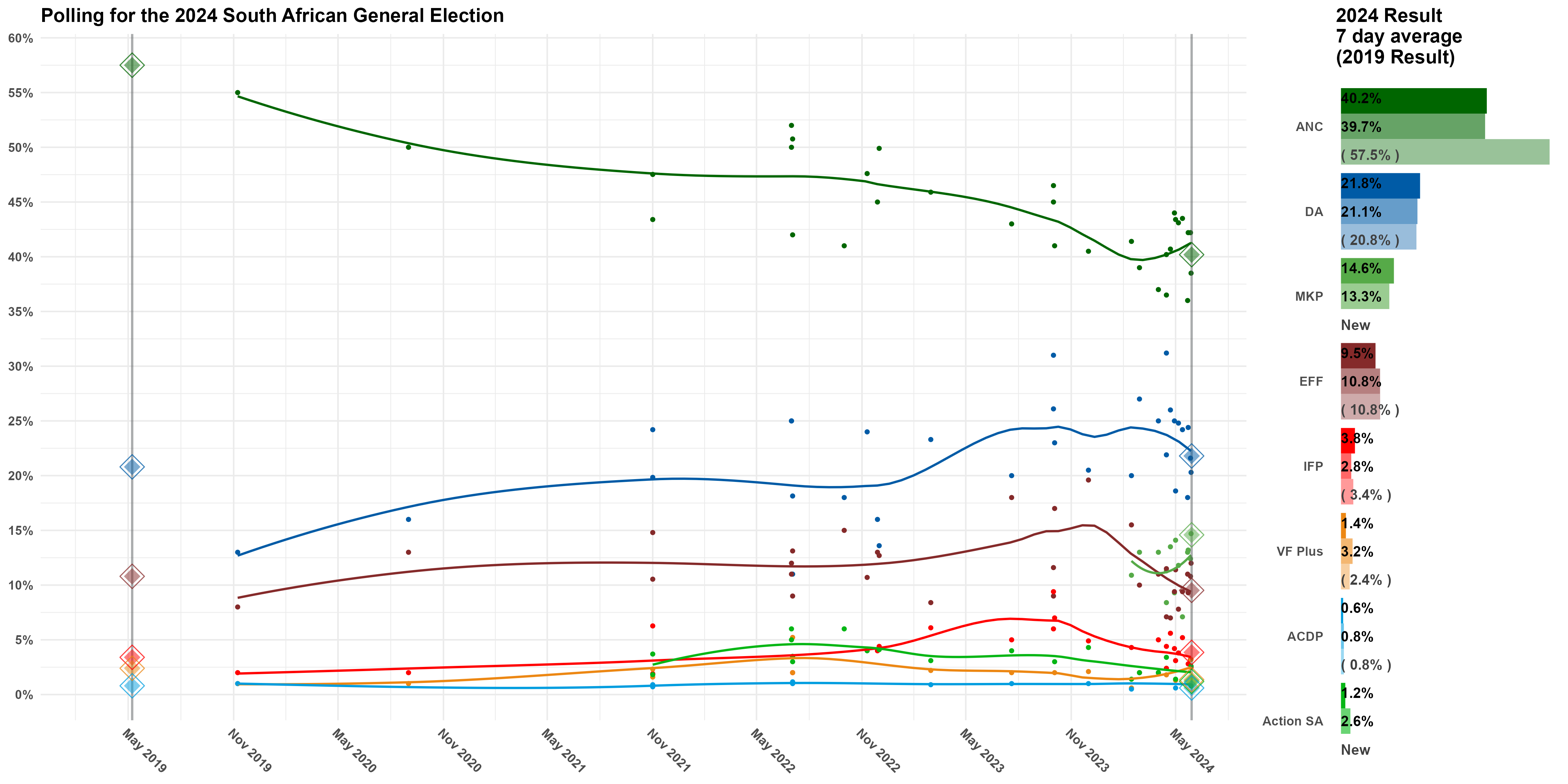
LOESS curve of the polling for the 2024 South African general election

Polling Organisation	Fieldwork Date	Sample Size	ANC	DA	MK	EFF	IFP	VF+	ACDP	ActionSA	Others	Don't Know (Note: Includes abstention and no answer responses)	Lead
2024 general election	29 May 2024	—N/a	40.2%	21.8%	14.6%	9.5%	3.9%	1.4%	0.6%	1.2%	6.8%	—N/a	18.4
AtlasIntel	25–28 May 2024	2,308	38.5%	20.3%	14.7%	12.0%	2.5%	3.2%	0.8%	2.6%	5.4%	—N/a	18.2
Social Research Foundation	27 May 2024	1,835	42.2%	21.6%	12.4%	10.8%	3.2%	—N/a	—N/a	—N/a	9.8%	—N/a	20.6
Social Research Foundation	23 May 2024	1,835	42.2%	24.4%	13.2%	9.3%	2.8%	—N/a	—N/a	—N/a	8.1%	—N/a	17.8
AFROBAROMETER	22 May 2024	1,800	36%	18%	13%	11%	—N/a	—N/a	—N/a	—N/a	22%	—N/a	18
Social Research Foundation	13 May 2024	1,835	43.5%	24.2%	7.1%	9.4%	5.2%	—N/a	—N/a	—N/a	10.6%	—N/a	19.3
Social Research Foundation	6 May 2024	1,835	43.1%	24.8%	11.8%	7.8%	3.8%	—N/a	—N/a	—N/a	8.7%	—N/a	18.3
ENCA/Markdata	May 2024	TBA	43.4%	18.6%	14.1%	11.4%	3.1%	1.3%	0.6	1.4%	6.1%	—N/a	24.8
Social Research Foundation	29 April 2024	1,835	44.0%	25.0%	9.3%	9.4%	4.2%	—N/a	—N/a	—N/a	8.1%	—N/a	19
Social Research Foundation	22 April 2024	1,835	40.7%	26.0%	13.5%	7.0%	5.6%	—N/a	—N/a	—N/a	7.2%	—N/a	14.7
Social Research Foundation	15 April 2024	1,835	36.5%	31.2%	11.3%	7.1%	2.4%	—N/a	—N/a	—N/a	11.5%	—N/a	5.3
IPSOS	9 March – 15 April 2024	2,545	40.2%	21.9%	8.4%	11.5%	4.4%	1.8%	—N/a	3.4%	8.4%	—N/a	18.3
Social Research Foundation	April 2024	1,835	37%	25%	13%	11%	5%	2%	2%	2%	3%	—N/a	12
Brenthurst Foundation/SABI	12–28 February 2024	1,506	39%	27%	13%	10%	2%	—N/a	—N/a	2%	5%	—N/a	12
ENCA/Markdata	19 January – 14 February 2024	3,022	41.4%	20%	10.9%	15.5%	4.3%	0.6%	0.5%	1.4%	5.4%	—N/a	21.4
December 2023		uMkhonto we Sizwe (MK Party) splits from the ANC.											
IPSOS	23 October – 1 December 2023	3,600	40.5%	20.5%	—N/a	19.6%	4.9%	2.1%	1%	4.3%	7.1	—N/a	20
IRR	October 2023	604	46.5%	26.1%	—N/a	11.6%	9.4%	—N/a	—N/a	—N/a	—N/a	—N/a	20.4
Social Research Foundation	October 2023	1,412	45%	31%	—N/a	9%	6%	—N/a	—N/a	—N/a	9%	—N/a	14
7 October 2023		The ACDP joins the Multi-Party Charter. The charter now holds 112 out of the 400-seat National Assembly.											
Brenthurst Foundation/SABI	11 September – 3 October 2023	1,500	41%	23%	—N/a	17%	7%	2%	—N/a	3%	4%	3%	18
17 July 2023		The Multi-Party Charter is signed between the DA, IFP, VF+, ActionSA and 3 other parties holding 108 of 400 National Assembly seats.											
IPSOS & Inclusive Society Institute	1 June – 20 July 2023	3,600	43%	20%	—N/a	18%	5%	2%	1%	4%	7%	—N/a	23
Social Research Foundation	March 2023	1,517	45.9%	23.3%	—N/a	8.4%	6.1%	2.2%	0.9%	3.1%	10.1%	—N/a	22.6
IPSOS & Inclusive Society Institute	November 2022 – December 2022	< 3,600	49.9%	13.6%	—N/a	12.7%	4.4%	—N/a	—N/a	4.1%	15.2%	—N/a	36.3
IPSOS	26 October – 28 November 2022	3,513	45%	16%	—N/a	13%	4%	—N/a	—N/a	—N/a	22%		29
Brenthurst Foundation	27 October – 10 November 2022	1,000	47.6%	24%	—N/a	10.7%	—N/a	—N/a	—N/a	4%	12.2%	—N/a	23.6
Rivonia Circle	September – October 2022	2,000	41%	18%	—N/a	15%	—N/a	—N/a	—N/a	6%	7%	13%	23
Social Research Foundation	July 2022	3,204	52%	25%	—N/a	11%	—N/a	—N/a	—N/a	5%	7%		27
Social Research Foundation	July 2022	3,204	50%	25%	—N/a	12%	—N/a	—N/a	—N/a	6%	7%		25
Inclusive Society Institute	14 May – 3 July 2022	3,459	50.76%	18.14%	—N/a	13.12%	3.47%	5.22%	1.16%	3.49%	4.65%	—N/a	32.62
IPSOS	14 May – 3 July 2022	3,459	42%	11%	—N/a	9%	2%	2%	1%	3%	4%	26%	31
2021 municipal elections	1 November 2021	N/A	47.52%	19.84%	—N/a	10.54%	6.27%	2.32%	0.71%	1.82%	6.76%	—N/a	27.68
IPSOS	1 November 2021	N/A	43.4%	24.2%	—N/a	14.8%	1.9%	1.6%	0.9%	3.7%	9.5%	31%	19.2
IPSOS	July – September 2020	3,758	50%	16%	—N/a	13%	2%	1%	—N/a	—N/a	2%	16%	34
IPSOS	20 September – 8 November 2019	3,600	55%	13%	—N/a	8%	2%	1%	1%	—N/a	3%	18%	42
2019 general election	8 May 2019	—N/a	57.5%	20.8%	—N/a	10.8%	3.4%	2.4%	0.8%	—N/a	10.1%	—N/a	36.7

== Voting ==
Early voting for overseas citizens was held in South African diplomatic missions on 17 and 18 May. Early voting for domestic voters was held on 27 May, covering 1.6 million people including essential workers and about 624,000 people unable to leave their homes. On election day, polling in more than 23,000 precincts opened at 07:00 and closed at 21:00. Three thousand SANDF soldiers were deployed to ensure security during the election, while the Independent Electoral Commission said two people were arrested for interfering with voting operations. Julius Malema voted in Limpopo after queuing for three hours. Counting was delayed in several precincts due to last-minute queues of voters, with the last ballots being cast at around 03:00 on 30 May as electoral law allows those still lining up to vote at regular closing time to participate.

The African Union sent a mission led by former Kenyan president Uhuru Kenyatta to monitor the election. The voting was described as free and fair by the IEC and independent observers.

== Results ==
The election resulted in a historic defeat for the ANC, which having received only 40% of the vote, lost the parliamentary majority that it held since 1994. It also failed to secure a majority in Northern Cape and Gauteng, and was outpolled in KwaZulu-Natal by the MK. In overseas voting, the DA won 75.23% of the 39,084 votes cast and retained its majority in the Western Cape. The ANC retained reduced majorities in Eastern Cape, Free State, Limpopo, Mpumalanga and North West and retained largest opposition status in Western Cape, while the DA retained its largest opposition status in the National Assembly. No overall majority was achieved in the National Assembly, nor in the provinces of KwaZulu-Natal, Gauteng or Northern Cape, with the MK achieving a plurality in KwaZulu-Natal and the ANC being forced into second-largest party status in KwaZulu-Natal for the first time since it first won the province in 2004. Most of the ANC's loss of support flowed into the MK, while the DA saw some gains, and the EFF lost some support. The proportion of women members of the National Assembly remained at 45%, the same level as after the 2019 election.

=== National Assembly ===

Vote strength by municipalities and provinces (bottom right)

Party	National ballot				Regional ballot				Total seats	+/–
Party	Votes	%	+/–	Seats	Votes	%	+/–	Seats	Total seats	+/–
African National Congress	6,459,683	40.18	–17.32	73	6,231,519	39.38	—	86	159	–71
Democratic Alliance	3,505,735	21.81	+1.04	42	3,439,272	21.74	—	45	87	+3
uMkhonto weSizwe	2,344,309	14.58	New	31	2,237,877	14.14	—	27	58	New
Economic Freedom Fighters	1,529,961	9.52	–1.28	17	1,556,965	9.84	—	22	39	–5
Inkatha Freedom Party	618,207	3.85	+0.47	8	688,570	4.35	—	9	17	+3
Patriotic Alliance	330,425	2.06	+2.02	5	345,880	2.19	—	4	9	+9
Freedom Front Plus	218,850	1.36	–1.02	4	234,477	1.48	—	2	6	–4
ActionSA	192,373	1.20	New	4	219,477	1.39	—	2	6	New
African Christian Democratic Party	96,575	0.60	–0.24	3	93,581	0.59	—	0	3	–1
United Democratic Movement	78,448	0.49	+0.04	2	85,618	0.54	—	1	3	+1
Rise Mzansi	67,975	0.42	New	1	70,142	0.44	—	1	2	New
Build One South Africa	65,912	0.41	New	2	69,020	0.44	—	0	2	New
African Transformation Movement	63,554	0.40	–0.04	2	66,831	0.42	—	0	2	0
Al Jama-ah	39,067	0.24	+0.06	2	53,337	0.34	—	0	2	+1
National Coloured Congress	37,422	0.23	New	1	47,178	0.30	—	1	2	New
Pan Africanist Congress of Azania	36,716	0.23	+0.04	1	40,788	0.26	—	0	1	0
United Africans Transformation	35,679	0.22	New	1	32,185	0.20	—	0	1	New
Good	29,501	0.18	–0.22	1	36,103	0.23	—	0	1	–1
#Hope4SA	27,206	0.17	New	0	16,872	0.11	—	0	0	New
Allied Movement for Change	22,055	0.14	New	0	18,393	0.12	—	0	0	New
United Independent Movement	20,003	0.12	New	0	18,907	0.12	—	0	0	New
African Independent Congress	19,900	0.12	–0.16	0	3,833	0.02	—	0	0	–2
National Freedom Party	19,397	0.12	–0.23	0	22,726	0.14	—	0	0	–2
Azanian People's Organisation	19,048	0.12	+0.05	0	18,741	0.12	—	0	0	0
African Congress for Transformation	18,354	0.11	New	0	348	0.00	—	0	0	New
African Heart Congress	16,306	0.10	New	0	3,579	0.02	—	0	0	New
Congress of the People	14,177	0.09	–0.18	0	16,768	0.11	—	0	0	–2
African People's Convention	13,195	0.08	–0.03	0	14,693	0.09	—	0	0	0
Africa Restoration Alliance	11,108	0.07	New	0	12,651	0.08	—	0	0	New
Forum for Service Delivery	11,077	0.07	+0.03	0	7,444	0.05	—	0	0	0
Democratic Liberal Congress	10,904	0.07	+0.01	0	7,022	0.04	—	0	0	0
Alliance of Citizens for Change	9,336	0.06	New	0	11,217	0.07	—	0	0	New
Action Alliance Development Party	7,802	0.05	New	0	4,600	0.03	—	0	0	New
Conservatives in Action	7,424	0.05	New	0	1,115	0.01	—	0	0	New
South African Royal Kingdoms Organisation	6,685	0.04	New	0	3,195	0.02	—	0	0	New
Northern Cape Communities Movement	6,629	0.04	New	0	7,016	0.04	—	0	0	New
People's Movement for Change	5,539	0.03	New	0	7,045	0.04	—	0	0	New
Abantu Batho Congress	5,531	0.03	New	0	3,552	0.02	—	0	0	New
Economic Liberators Forum	5,408	0.03	New	0	7,115	0.04	—	0	0	New
Organic Humanity Movement	5,241	0.03	New	0	6,457	0.04	—	0	0	New
African Content Movement	5,107	0.03	0.00	0	4,617	0.03	—	0	0	0
Sizwe Ummah Nation	5,016	0.03	New	0	4,869	0.03	—	0	0	New
South African Rainbow Alliance	4,796	0.03	New	0	7,645	0.05	—	0	0	New
African People's Movement	4,601	0.03	New	0	4,200	0.03	—	0	0	New
Able Leadership	3,867	0.02	New	0	3,161	0.02	—	0	0	New
Referendum Party	3,834	0.02	New	0	4,206	0.03	—	0	0	New
All Citizens Party	3,693	0.02	New	0	1,644	0.01	—	0	0	New
Africa Africans Reclaim	3,371	0.02	New	0	2,565	0.02	—	0	0	New
Citizans	2,992	0.02	New	0	4,084	0.03	—	0	0	New
Xiluva	2,592	0.02	New	0	1,167	0.01	—	0	0	New
African Movement Congress	2,141	0.01	New	0	1,550	0.01	—	0	0	New
Free Democrats	1,992	0.01	0.00	0	2,276	0.01	—	0	0	0
Independents					19,304	0.12		0	0	New
Total	16,076,719	100.00	–	200	15,823,397	100.00	–	200	400	0
Valid votes	16,076,719	98.69			15,823,397	99.02				
Invalid/blank votes	213,437	1.31			156,834	0.98				
Total votes	16,290,156	100.00			15,980,231	100.00				
Registered voters/turnout	27,782,081	58.64			27,782,081	57.52				
Source: Electoral Commission of South Africa, IOL

Top four parties' performance by region
The ANC's seat loss by region and national ballot

The ANC's performance by region

The DA's performance by region

The MK's performance by region

The EFF's performance by region
Party with the most votes by ward
Western Cape
Democratic Alliance
African National Congress
Patriotic Alliance

=== National Council of Provinces ===
Following the results of the general election, the new provincial legislatures met on 13 and 14 June 2024 to elect NCOP delegations. The first sitting of the NCOP took place on 15 June 2024. The delegations elected are described in the following table. The proportion of women among the 54 permanent delegates to the NCOP, after the 2024 election, was 44%.

Party	Delegate type	Province									Total	
Party	Delegate type	EC	FS	G	KZN	L	M	NW	NC	WC	Total	
African National Congress	Permanent	3	3	2	1	4	3	4	3	1	24	43
African National Congress	Special	3	2	2	1	4	2	2	2	1	19	43
Democratic Alliance	Permanent	1	1	2	1	1	1	1	1	3	12	20
Democratic Alliance	Special	1	1	1				1	1	3	8	20
Economic Freedom Fighters	Permanent	1	1	1		1	1	1	1	1	8	10
Economic Freedom Fighters	Special						1	1			2	10
UMkhonto WeSizwe	Permanent			1	3		1				5	9
UMkhonto WeSizwe	Special		1		2		1				4	9
Freedom Front Plus	Permanent		1						1		2	2
Inkatha Freedom Party	Permanent				1						1	2
Inkatha Freedom Party	Special				1						1	2
Patriotic Alliance	Permanent									1	1	2
Patriotic Alliance	Special								1		1	2
United Democratic Movement	Permanent	1									1	1
ActionSA	Special			1							1	1
Total		10	10	10	10	10	10	10	10	10	90	

=== Provincial legislatures ===
Provincial election results

The ANC won seven provinces out of nine, securing majorities in five of them except for the Northern Cape and Gauteng, where it earned pluralities. It performed best in Limpopo, the country's northernmost province, winning slightly less than three quarters of the vote. The DA held on to the Western Cape, continuing its 15-year-rule over the province. Finally, the new MK party flipped KwaZulu Natal from the ANC, earning 37 out of 80 seats to gain a plurality. Women's average representation after the provincial elections was 44% in the provincial legislatures and 47% in the provincial executives. Only two out of the nine premiers were women, and only two out of the nine speakers in the legislatures were men.

== Aftermath ==
While counting was ongoing, the ANC said that its leadership would meet on 31 May to "reflect on what is good for the country." The DA's John Steenhuisen said that the results showed that South Africa was "heading into coalition country" and expressed a willingness to work alongside the ANC, adding that he would have to first consult with other signatories of the Multi-Party Charter. The DA also said that a government composed of the ANC, the MK, and the EFF would be a "doomsday coalition" pursuing previous policy failures in the country. The EFF's Julius Malema said that the election results marked the end of the ANC's "entitlement of being the sole dominant party", adding that he was open to talks with the ANC on forming a coalition government. The Patriotic Alliance's Gayton McKenzie compared prospects of an ANC-DA coalition to "a marriage of two drunk people in Las Vegas" that would prove "unworkable".

Gwede Mantashe, the ANC's national chair, said that the party had started to conduct informal talks with other parties for a possible coalition. On 2 June, ANC secretary-general Fikile Mbalula announced the official opening of negotiations, adding that the party had heard the popular will and was "humbled" by the election result. Mbalula also said that the ANC would reject conditions by other parties for Cyril Ramaphosa to step down as president. In his first statement following the election later that day, Ramaphosa called on political parties to overcome their differences and find "common ground" in creating a coalition government. Separate coalition talks were expected to occur regarding the provincial governments of KwaZulu-Natal, Gauteng and Northern Cape.

On 4 June, the ANC released an internal document which advised for a coalition with both the DA and IFP. The document also stated that the ANC "should not consider" an alliance with either the EFF or the MK. On 5 June, the ANC formally announced that it was seeking to create a national unity government, with spokesperson Mahlengi Bhengu-Motsiri saying that the party had discussions with the DA, the EFF and three other smaller parties, but received no positive response from the MK. These discussions, which were still in the early stages, would continue, with the ANC framing them as an attempt to form a government of "national unity" and not just as an option for a formal coalition. On 6 June, the MK confirmed that it was engaged in negotiations with the ANC. On 12 June, the IFP said that it was willing to join a unity government that included the ANC and the DA. On 13 June, the ANC announced that the DA and several other parties had agreed on the "fundamental" principle of forming the national unity government, with a framework to be disclosed on 14 June. On 14 June, John Steenhuisen announced that the DA had entered into a coalition agreement with the ANC and provided its support for Ramaphosa's reelection as president. The Patriotic Alliance also provided its support. This coalition agreement was also confirmed by ANC secretary general Fikile Mbalula, who described it as a "remarkable step." The "fundamental" principles of what was to become a grand coalition was set by a written agreement dated 17 June 2024 between ANC and DA, referred to as the Statement of Intent.

On 6 June, ActionSA announced they would leave the Multi-Party Charter as the party believed some member parties had breached the agreement by considering forming a coalition with the ANC. This decision reduced the charter's seat count from 119 to 113 in the 400-seat National Assembly.

=== First sitting of parliament ===
On 10 June, Chief Justice Raymond Zondo declared that the first sitting of the new National Assembly would occur on 14 June, during which elections for parliamentary speaker and president would be held. The session proceeded as scheduled, with the ANC's Thoko Didiza being elected parliamentary speaker after she defeated the Economic Freedom Fighters' Veronica Mente with 284 votes to 49. The same day, the National Assembly re-elected Ramaphosa as President of South Africa after defeating Economic Freedom Fighters leader Julius Malema with 283 votes to 54. The DA's Annelie Lotriet was elected Deputy Speaker after defeating the African Transformation Movement's Vuyo Zungula with 273 votes to 54. Lotriet became the first non-ANC member to hold the position of Deputy Speaker of the National Assembly since Bhadra Ranchod, who served as Deputy Speaker between 1994 and 1996.

On the same day, the ANC, the DA, the Inkatha Freedom Party (IFP) and the Patriotic Alliance (PA), agreed to form a national unity government, with Cyril Ramaphosa being re-elected President of South Africa. He was sworn in as president on 19 June while negotiations on the cabinet were ongoing.

In an interview on SABC News' Face the Nation current affairs programme, DA Federal Council Chairperson Helen Zille said in reference to the Patriotic Alliance admission: "So you can't just let anybody come in without consulting with us and then he makes the appointments in consultation with the leaders of the parties who have been accepted for admission". Zille specifically referred to Clause 17 of the Statement of Intent, which governs the President's powers in appointing an Executive. Clauses 18 and 19 of the statement deal with the concept of "sufficient consensus", which among other points, only exists when "parties to the GNU representing 60% of the seats in the National Assembly agree".

Other parties to join the national unity government were GOOD, shortly after the first sitting of parliament, the PAC, on the 19th, and the FF+ on the 20th of June. The UDM decided to join on the 21st, Rise Mzansi on the 22nd, Al Jama-ah on the 23rd, and UAT on the 30th of June 2024. This brought the GNU to 288 seats in the 400 seat parliament (72%). On 12 July 2024 the UAT withdrew from the GNU, because it did not receive any positions in the Cabinet. This did not adjust the 72% of GNU seats in parliament.

The DA reportedly requested 10 posts in the cabinet, including the ministries of Communication and digital technology, Trade and industry, Transport, Public service and administration, Water and sanitation, Local government and Health, as well as deputy minister posts of finance and health. In addition, the DA requested that John Steenhuisen be designated as deputy president over ANC incumbent Paul Mashatile. The ANC rejected most of the requests on the grounds of multiple other parties joining the coalition negotiations, instead agreeing to up to five cabinet positions for the DA. The DA's negotiators, including Steenhuisen and Tony Leon, considered withdrawing, but instead agreed to keep negotiations open with the ANC.

On 30 June, Ramaphosa unveiled his new 32-member cabinet, with the ANC holding 20 posts, the DA holding six, and the remainder being held by other coalition members. John Steenhuisen was appointed as agriculture minister, while the leaders of four other parties were also named ministers. In addition, 42 deputy ministers were named from among the coalition parties.

In the 6th Parliament's final session, the National Assembly voted to establish the Electoral Reform Consultation Panel to independently investigate and recommend potential reforms to South Africa's electoral system. The Electoral Reform Consultation Panel published their final report in August 2025 recommending a change to the electoral system to be used in the 2029 election.

== Provincial formations ==
Despite gains in KwaZulu-Natal province during the general election, Jacob Zuma's MK party suffered a major setback in its heartland province on 14 June after the KwaZulu-Natal provincial legislative opted to elect IFP member Thami Ntuli over an MK candidate as Premier of KwaZulu-Natal. Ntuli defeated the MK Party's premier candidate, Zulu Nation's deputy prime minister Phathisizwe Chiliza, with 41 votes to 39. Ntuli took office and appointed his cabinet on 18 June, making him the first IFP member to serve as Premier of KwaZulu-Natal since 2004.

=== Allegations of misconduct ===
On 1 June, Jacob Zuma said that the MK was seeking to have the announcement of official results legally halted pending investigations over allegations of vote-rigging raised by the party, with MK officials citing possible tampering of the Independent Electoral Commission's computer system following glitches earlier that day. The IEC said it had received 579 objections from both voters and political parties regarding the election results, and ordered recounts in 24 cases. Police Minister Bheki Cele warned that authorities would not tolerate "threats of instability in order to register objections or concerns about the electoral processes".

The MK later filed a petition asking the Constitutional Court to halt the opening session of the new National Assembly on 14 June, adding that it would boycott the meeting. On 13 June, the Constitutional Court dismissed the petition, allowing the session to proceed. The MK continued to boycott parliamentary proceedings until 26 June, when its MPs finally took their oath as members of the National Assembly.

== See also ==
- Electoral Commission of South Africa
- List of political parties in South Africa
- Multi-Party Charter
- Cape independence
