= National Assembly (South Africa) =

Lower house of the Parliament of South Africa

National Assembly Name in official languages: Nasionale Vergadering (Afrikaans); iNdlu yesiBethamthetho seNarha (Southern Ndebele); iNdlu yoWiso-mthetho yeSizwe (Xhosa); iSishayamthetho sikaZwelonke (Zulu); liBandla laVelonkhe (Swazi); Seboka sa Maloko a Palamente (Northern Sotho); Ntlo ya Seboka sa Naha (Sotho); Ntlokokoano Bosetšhaba (Tswana); Huvo ya Rixaka (Tsonga); Buthano ḽa Lushaka (Venda)
- 28th Parliament

Type
- Type: Lower house of the Parliament of South Africa

History
- Founded: 1994; 32 years ago

Leadership
- Speaker: Thoko Didiza, ANC since 14 June 2024
- Deputy Speaker: Annelie Lotriet, DA since 14 June 2024
- Leader of Government Business: Paul Mashatile, ANC since 7 March 2023
- Leader of the Opposition: John Hlophe, MK since 25 June 2024

Structure
- Seats: 400 MPs
- Political groups: Government (287); ANC (159); DA (87); IFP (17); PA (9); VF+ (6); UDM (3); Al Jama-ah (2); RISE (2); Good (1); PAC (1); Opposition (113); PC (100) (Note: MK (58); EFF (39); ATM (2); UAT (1)); ActionSA (6); ACDP (3); BOSA (2); NCC (2)

Elections
- Voting system: Closed list proportional representation
- First election: 15 September 1910 26–29 April 1994
- Last election: 29 May 2024
- Next election: By 2029

Meeting place
- Good Hope Chamber and Nieuwmeester Dome (temporarily); Cape Town, South Africa

Website
- National Assembly – Parliament of South Africa

The National Assembly is the directly elected house of the Parliament of South Africa, located in Cape Town, Western Cape. It consists of four hundred Members of Parliament (MPs), who are elected every five years using a party-list proportional representation system where half of the members are elected proportionally from nine provincial lists and the remaining half from national lists so as to restore proportionality.

The National Assembly is presided over by a speaker, assisted by a deputy speaker. The current speaker as of 14 June 2024 is Thoko Didiza (ANC). The Deputy Speaker is Annelie Lotriet (DA) since 14 June 2024.

The National Assembly chamber was destroyed in a fire in January 2022. National Assembly sittings are now held in the old Good Hope Chamber, which is within the precincts of parliament.

The National Assembly ties the U.S. state of New Hampshire's House of Representatives as the fourth-largest lower house of a legislature in the English-speaking world (behind the 435-member United States House of Representatives, 543-member Lok Sabha of India, and 650-member House of Commons of the United Kingdom).

== Allocation ==
The National Assembly seats are allocated using a proportional representation system with closed lists. Seats are first allocated according to the (integer part of the) Droop quota. Thereafter, at most five seats are allocated using the largest remainder method (using the Droop quota). Any additional seats are allocated amongst the parties who then already have seats using the highest averages method.

Voters previously had one vote at elections to the National Assembly, but since the 2024 South African general election voters cast two votes. Seats are allocated in ten multi-member constituencies via party lists. One constituency is a national or 'at large' constituency and nine others represent each of the nine provinces. The lists were called the national lists and regional lists in the 2009 election. 'Regional' was used to avoid confusion with the provincial legislature elections held at the same time. Previously they were called 'National to National' and 'Provincial to National'.

Of the 400 members of the National Assembly, half are assigned to be elected from national lists and the remaining half are assigned to be elected from regional lists. Every election, the Independent Electoral Commission (IEC) determines the allocation of the 200 regional list seats to each province by population.

Parties decide whether they want to set up both national and regional lists or only regional lists. In the 2009 election, the Democratic Alliance (DA) chose not to use a national list. The nationwide votes entitled the DA to 67 seats, but the provincial votes amounted to only 35 seats. While normally the remaining 32 members would be drawn from the party's national list, in this case the remaining seats were distributed among the other DA regional list candidates. This resulted in the National Assembly being made up of 168 members elected on national lists and 232 members elected on regional lists.

== History ==
The National Assembly was first elected in South Africa's first non-racial election in 1994 with the African National Congress (ANC) winning 252 of the 400 seats. The National Party (NP), the previous governing party, won 82 seats, and the Inkatha Freedom Party (IFP) won 43. Under the terms of the Interim Constitution this result entitled the NP and the IFP to take part in the Government of National Unity alongside the ANC, and gave the ANC and NP the right to each nominate one Deputy President. The other parties represented in the assembly were the Freedom Front (9 seats), the Democratic Party (7 seats), the Pan Africanist Congress (5 seats), and the African Christian Democratic Party (2 seats).

In the election of 1999, the ANC won 266 seats, one short of the two-thirds majority needed to unilaterally amend the constitution. The DP expanded its representation to become the official opposition with 38 seats, while the IFP won 34. The NP, now renamed the New National Party (NNP), dropped to 28 seats, and the newly formed United Democratic Movement (UDM) won 14. Eight smaller parties also obtained seats in the assembly.

In the election of 2004 the ANC obtained 279 seats, gaining a two-thirds majority and the ability to change the constitution. The DP became the Democratic Alliance (DA) and remained the official opposition with 50 seats, while the IFP won 28 seats. The NNP was severely weakened, obtaining only 7 seats; the party was formally disbanded in 2005 with the majority of the party joining the ANC.

In the election of 2009 the ANC lost its two-thirds majority but remained the majority party with 264 seats. The DA increased its support to 67 seats, and the new Congress of the People (COPE) party, a breakaway from the ANC, obtained 30 seats. The IFP was reduced to 18 seats.

In the election of 2014 the ANC lost further seats, but remained the majority party with 249 seats. The DA increased its support to 89 seats, while the Economic Freedom Fighters (EFF), a far-left breakaway from the ANC, obtained 25 seats. The IFP further reduced to 10 seats while COPE's influence was strongly reduced, only electing three MPs.

In the election of 2019 the ANC lost even more seats, but remained the majority party with a seat total of 230 seats. The Official Opposition DA declined from 89 seats to 84 seats. The EFF increased its seat total to 44 seats. The IFP managed to arrest the decline in its support and obtained 14 seats. The Freedom Front Plus (FF+) grew to 10 seats, a gain of 6 seats. Nine other parties obtained seats.

In the election of 2024 the ANC lost its majority for the first time since the end of apartheid, winning just 159 seats out of 400. This was in large part due to the formation of the breakaway MK Party founded by Jacob Zuma, which received 58 seats. The DA fought the election with a provisional coalition known as the Multi-Party Charter. After an extensive negotiation process between parties supporting a "statement of intent", a grand coalition, referred to as the Government of National Unity (GNU), was formed by eleven parties, which together holds a supermajority with 288 seats. On 30 June 2024 the president announced the finalisation of the GNU, with the nine parties having been allocated ministers or deputy ministers in the cabinet.

The following table shows the party composition of the National Assembly over time:

Event	Date	ANC	DP / DA	NP / NNP	COPE	EFF	IFP	MK	NFP	VF / VF+	UDM	ACDP	ID	Others
1994 election	27 April 1994	252	7	82	—	—	43	—	—	9	—	2	—	5
1999 election	2 June 1999	266	38	28	—	—	34	—	—	3	14	6	—	11
2003 floor-crossing	4 April 2003	275	46	20	—	—	31	—	—	3	4	7	1	13
2004 election	14 April 2004	279	50	7	—	—	28	—	—	4	9	7	7	9
2005 floor-crossing	15 September 2005	293	47	—	—	—	23	—	—	4	6	4	5	18
2007 floor-crossing	15 September 2007	297	47	—	—	—	23	—	—	4	6	4	4	15
2009 election	22 April 2009	264	67	—	30	—	18	—	—	4	4	3	4	6
2014 election	7 May 2014	249	89	—	3	25	10	—	6	4	4	3	—	7
2019 election	8 May 2019	230	84	—	2	44	14	—	2	10	2	4	—	10
2024 election	29 May 2024	159	87	—	—	39	17	58	—	6	3	3	—	28

== Election results ==
The last finalised election was held on 29 May 2024.

Party	National ballot			Regional ballot			Total seats	+/–
Party	Votes	%	Seats	Votes	%	Seats	Total seats	+/–
African National Congress	6,459,683	40.18	73	6,231,519	39.40	86	159	–71
Democratic Alliance	3,505,735	21.81	42	3,439,272	21.75	45	87	+3
uMkhonto weSizwe	2,344,309	14.58	31	2,237,877	14.15	27	58	New
Economic Freedom Fighters	1,529,961	9.52	17	1,556,965	9.85	22	39	–5
Inkatha Freedom Party	618,207	3.85	8	688,570	4.35	9	17	+3
Patriotic Alliance	330,425	2.06	5	345,880	2.19	4	9	+9
Freedom Front Plus	218,850	1.36	4	234,477	1.48	2	6	–4
ActionSA	192,373	1.20	4	219,477	1.39	2	6	New
African Christian Democratic Party	96,575	0.60	3	93,581	0.59	0	3	–1
United Democratic Movement	78,448	0.49	2	85,618	0.54	1	3	+1
Rise Mzansi	67,975	0.42	1	70,142	0.44	1	2	New
Build One South Africa	65,912	0.41	2	69,020	0.44	0	2	New
African Transformation Movement	63,554	0.40	2	66,831	0.42	0	2	0
Al Jama-ah	39,067	0.24	2	53,337	0.34	0	2	+1
National Coloured Congress	37,422	0.23	1	47,178	0.30	1	2	New
Pan Africanist Congress of Azania	36,716	0.23	1	40,788	0.26	0	1	0
United Africans Transformation	35,679	0.22	1	32,185	0.20	0	1	New
Good	29,501	0.18	1	36,103	0.23	0	1	–1
Hope4SA	27,206	0.17	0	16,872	0.11	0	0	New
Allied Movement for Change	22,055	0.14	0	18,393	0.12	0	0	New
United Independent Movement	20,003	0.12	0	18,907	0.12	0	0	New
African Independent Congress	19,900	0.12	0	3,833	0.02	0	0	0
National Freedom Party	19,397	0.12	0	22,726	0.14	0	0	–2
Azanian People's Organisation	19,048	0.12	0	18,741	0.12	0	0	–2
African Congress for Transformation	18,354	0.11	0	348	0.00	0	0	New
African Heart Congress	16,306	0.10	0	3,579	0.02	0	0	New
Congress of the People	14,177	0.09	0	16,768	0.11	0	0	–2
African People's Convention	13,195	0.08	0	14,693	0.09	0	0	0
Africa Restoration Alliance	11,108	0.07	0	12,651	0.08	0	0	New
Forum for Service Delivery	11,077	0.07	0	7,444	0.05	0	0	0
Democratic Liberal Congress	10,904	0.07	0	7,022	0.04	0	0	0
Alliance of Citizens for Change	9,336	0.06	0	11,217	0.07	0	0	New
Action Alliance Development Party	7,802	0.05	0	4,600	0.03	0	0	New
Conservatives in Action	7,424	0.05	0	1,115	0.01	0	0	New
South African Royal Kingdoms Organisation	6,685	0.04	0	3,195	0.02	0	0	New
Northern Cape Communities Movement	6,629	0.04	0	7,016	0.04	0	0	New
People's Movement for Change	5,539	0.03	0	7,045	0.04	0	0	New
Abantu Batho Congress	5,531	0.03	0	3,552	0.02	0	0	New
Economic Liberators Forum	5,408	0.03	0	7,115	0.04	0	0	New
Organic Humanity Movement	5,241	0.03	0	6,457	0.04	0	0	New
African Content Movement	5,107	0.03	0	4,617	0.03	0	0	0
Sizwe Ummah Nation	5,016	0.03	0	4,869	0.03	0	0	New
South African Rainbow Alliance	4,796	0.03	0	7,645	0.05	0	0	New
African People's Movement	4,601	0.03	0	4,200	0.03	0	0	New
Able Leadership	3,867	0.02	0	3,161	0.02	0	0	New
Referendum Party	3,834	0.02	0	4,206	0.03	0	0	New
All Citizens Party	3,693	0.02	0	1,644	0.01	0	0	New
Africa Africans Reclaim	3,371	0.02	0	2,565	0.02	0	0	New
Citizans	2,992	0.02	0	4,084	0.03	0	0	New
Xiluva	2,592	0.02	0	1,167	0.01	0	0	New
African Movement Congress	2,141	0.01	0	1,550	0.01	0	0	New
Free Democrats	1,992	0.01	0	2,276	0.01	0	0	0
Zackie Achmat (Independent)				10,568	0.07	0	0	New
Total	16,076,719	100.00	200	15,814,661	100.00	200	400	0
Valid votes	16,076,719	98.69		15,814,661	99.02			
Invalid/blank votes	213,437	1.31		156,834	0.98			
Total votes	16,290,156	100.00		15,971,495	100.00			
Registered voters/turnout	27,782,081	58.64		27,782,081	57.49			
Source: Electoral Commission of South Africa, IOL

== Current composition of Parliament compared to % of vote ==
Election Results
Party	Seats	%	% of votes
ANC	159	39.75%	39.80%
DA	87	21.75%	21.78%
MK	58	14.50%	14.37%
EFF	39	9.75%	9.68%
IFP	17	4.25%	4.10%
PA	9	2.25%	2.12%
VF+	6	1.50%	1.42%
ActionSA	6	1.50%	1.29%
ACDP	3	0.75%	0.60%
UDM	3	0.75%	0.51%
RISE	2	0.50%	0.43%
BOSA	2	0.50%	0.42%
ATM	2	0.50%	0.41%
Al Jama-ah	2	0.50%	0.29%
NCC	2	0.50%	0.27%
PAC	1	0.25%	0.24%
UAT	1	0.25%	0.21%
Good	1	0.25%	0.21%
Hope4SA	0	0.00%	0.14%
Total	400	100.00%	100.00%

== Salaries of members of the National Assembly ==
=== Annual monetary remuneration ===
As of 2024, the highest earning members of the National Assembly are the Speaker of the National Assembly and the deputy president of the Republic of South Africa, who is the head of the executive government's representatives in the National Assembly. They each earn an annual salary of R3,164,654.

The second highest earning Members of Parliament (MPs) in the National Assembly are those who are also cabinet ministers. They earn an annual salary of R2,689,937.

The Deputy Speaker and deputy ministers earn an annual salary of R2,215,220.

Senior MPs, such as the leader of the opposition and chief whips of the majority party, earn an annual salary of R1,792,595.

MPs who chair committees earn an annual salary of R1,675,314.

Leaders of minority parties earn R1,507,841.

Regular MPs earn R1,274,536.

=== Other benefits ===
- 88 domestic journeys per year which can either be by air, train, bus or vehicle.
- Transport to and from South African airports.
- Parking at South African airports.
- Transport of dependents.
- Relocation costs.
- "Tools of trade", which include mobile phones, tablets and laptops.
- Equipment, furniture and stationery for MPs' offices inside the national assembly.
- Personal accident insurance.
- Accommodation at the parliamentary villages in Cape Town.
- Daily transport to and from the villages to parliament.

According to Business Insider South Africa, SA MPs are in the top 1% earning bracket in the nation. The lowest earning MP earns a monthly salary of around R92,245. This salary comes while the average South African earned a monthly salary of around R21,432, as of September 2019 and the minimum wage was just R20 per hour.

== See also ==
- List of members of the National Assembly of South Africa who died in office
