= Free Democrats (South Africa) =

Political party in South Africa

- Ideology: Libertarianism
- National Assembly seats: 0 / 400
- Provincial Legislatures: 0 / 430

Website
- freedemocrats.co.za

The Free Democrats (FREE DEMS) is a South African political party founded by neurologist Dr. Johan Reid to lobby for private health care, and is opposed to the government's proposed National Health Insurance. It is furthermore in favour of free enterprise, privatisation, private education and lower taxes.

== Proposal for Medical Aid ==
The Free Democrats propose to establish a medical aid for every citizen, one comprehensive medical aid plan from birth to death, funded by a Health Insurance Fund (HIF) which will be, for its part funded by existing sin taxes (tobacco, alcohol, gambling and sugar taxes), carbon taxes and a portion of all VAT collected. Everybody should pay for healthcare, but the "big spenders, boozers, smokers, gamblers, binge eaters and polluters" should pay more. They do not propose any new taxes. Under their proposal healthcare facilities will be managed and operated by private healthcare companies.

== Election results ==
The party contested the 2019 general election at national level and in the Western Cape, failing to win a seat. They contested again in 2024 at the national level only, again failing to win a seat.

=== National Assembly elections ===
Election	Total votes	Share of vote	Seats	+/–	Government
2019	2,580	0.01%	0 / 400	New	Extra-parliamentary
2024	1,992	0.01% (Note: From 2024, seats in the National Assembly are determined by a combination of the national ballot, and the nine regional ballots. Only the national ballot figures are shown here.)	0 / 400	0	Extra-parliamentary

=== Provincial elections ===
Election	Eastern Cape		Free State		Gauteng		Kwazulu-Natal		Limpopo		Mpumalanga		North-West		Northern Cape		Western Cape	
Election	%	Seats	%	Seats	%	Seats	%	Seats	%	Seats	%	Seats	%	Seats	%	Seats	%	Seats
2019	-	-	-	-	-	-	-	-	-	-	-	-	-	-	-	-	0.02%	0/42
