= Democratic Liberal Congress =

Political party in South Africa

- Founder: Patrick Pillay
- Founded: June 2016
- Split from: Minority Front
- Ideology: Liberalism
- Political position: Centre
- National Assembly seats: 0 / 400
- Provincial Legislatures: 0 / 430

Website
- dlc.org.za

The Democratic Liberal Congress (DLC) is a South African political party formed in 2016 by Patrick Pillay.

Pillay was a Minority Front councillor for fifteen years before infighting in that party after the death of longstanding leader Amichand Rajbansi led him to break away and form the DLC.

The party opposes affirmative action and land expropriation without compensation, and is in favour of austerity measures for government and simplifying business.

== Election results ==
=== National Assembly elections ===
Election	Party leader	Total votes	Share of vote	Seats	+/–	Government
2019	Patrick Pillay	10,767	0.06%	0 / 400	New	Extra-parliamentary
2024	Patrick Pillay	10,904	0.07% (Note: From 2024, seats in the National Assembly are determined by a combination of the national ballot, and the nine regional ballots. Only the national ballot figures are shown here.)	0 / 400	0	Extra-parliamentary

=== Provincial elections ===
Election	Eastern Cape		Free State		Gauteng		Kwazulu-Natal		Limpopo		Mpumalanga		North-West		Northern Cape		Western Cape	
Election	%	Seats	%	Seats	%	Seats	%	Seats	%	Seats	%	Seats	%	Seats	%	Seats	%	Seats
2019							0.38	0/80										
2024							0.17	0/80										

=== Municipal elections ===
Election	Votes	%
2016	11,895	0.03%
2021	8,178	0.03%
