= Sizwe Ummah Nation =

Political party in South Africa

- Leader: Rasheed Ebrahim Gutta
- Founded: 2024
- Split from: African National Congress
- Ideology: Islamic democracy
- National Assembly seats: 0 / 400
- Provincial Legislatures: 0 / 430

The Sizwe Ummah Natione (SUN) is a minor political party in South Africa that seeks to promote Islamic values and principles. Its stated goal is to empower citizens through self-sufficiency and sustainable development.

== History ==
=== Origin ===
The SUN was founded by a group of individuals who broke away from the African National Congress (ANC) primarily led by Rashid Gutta.

The party aims to drive positive change and build a brighter future for all South Africans, regardless of their background or beliefs. The party's vision is to create a nation founded on integrity, justice, and equal opportunities for all, where everyone can thrive and reach their full potential.

== Current structure and composition ==
The SUN has a central committee led by Ahmed Munzoor Shaik Emam as the president, with a secretary-general and other office bearers.

== Foreign policy and relations ==
The SUN has not articulated a clear foreign policy but has expressed support for African unity and solidarity with other African nations.

== Election results ==
=== National Assembly elections ===
Election	Party leader	Votes	Share of vote	Seats	+/–	Government
2024	Rasheed Ebrahim Gutta	5,016	0.03% (Note: From 2024, seats in the National Assembly are determined by a combination of the national ballot, and the nine regional ballots. Only the national ballot figures are shown here.)	0 / 400	New	Extra-parliamentary

=== Provincial elections ===
Election	Eastern Cape		Free State		Gauteng		Kwazulu-Natal		Limpopo		Mpumalanga		North-West		Northern Cape		Western Cape	
Election	%	Seats	%	Seats	%	Seats	%	Seats	%	Seats	%	Seats	%	Seats	%	Seats	%	Seats
2024					0.02	0/80	0.08	0/80					0.05	0/38			0.05	0/42
