= African Heart Congress =

Political party in South Africa

- Founded: 2020
- National Assembly seats: 0 / 400
- Provincial Legislatures: 0 / 430

The African Heart Congress Party (AHCP) is a minor political party in South Africa. The party was founded by Moloko Mpolobosho, a former ANC member and businessman. The party was launched in March 2020, in Ivory Park, Johannesburg.

== History ==
=== Origin ===
The AHCP was founded in 2020 by a group of individuals who broke away from the African National Congress (ANC).

== Current structure and composition ==
The AHCP has a central committee led by Mpolobosho as the president, with a secretary-general and other office bearers. The party has a small presence in a few provinces, with most of its support coming from the Gauteng Province.

== Foreign policy and relations ==
The AHCP has not articulated a clear foreign policy but has expressed support for African unity and solidarity with other African nations.

== Criticism and controversy ==
The AHCP has been criticized for its lack of clear policies and its perceived opportunism in breaking away from the ANC. Some have also questioned Mvana's leadership style and the party's lack of transparency in its finances and decision-making processes.

== Election results ==
=== National Assembly elections ===
Election	Party leader	Total votes	Share of vote	Seats	+/–	Government
2024	Mfecane Mvana	16,306	0.10% (Note: From 2024, seats in the National Assembly are determined by a combination of the national ballot, and the nine regional ballots. Only the national ballot figures are shown here.)	0 / 400	New	Extra-parliamentary

=== Provincial elections ===
Election	Eastern Cape		Free State		Gauteng		Kwazulu-Natal		Limpopo		Mpumalanga		North-West		Northern Cape		Western Cape	
Election	%	Seats	%	Seats	%	Seats	%	Seats	%	Seats	%	Seats	%	Seats	%	Seats	%	Seats
2024					0.10	0/80												
