= African Transformation Movement =

South African political party

- Abbreviation: ATM
- Leader: Caesar Nongqunga
- Founded: 2018; 8 years ago
- Headquarters: Fedsure House, 1st Floor, Church Street, Pietermaritzburg, Kwa-Zulu Natal
- Ideology: Conservatism; Christian democracy Right-wing populism Anti-immigration
- Political position: Centre-right
- National affiliation: Progressive Caucus
- Slogan: Transforming Society For A Better Tomorrow
- National Assembly: 2 / 400
- NCOP: 0 / 90
- Provincial Legislatures: 2 / 487

Website
- www.facebook.com/AfricanTransformationMovement

The African Transformation Movement (ATM) is a political party in South Africa. It was formed with the backing of the South African Council of Messianic Churches in Christ (SACMCC), which together are supported by millions of congregants.

== History ==
ATM was founded in 2018 by the South African Council of Messianic Churches in Christ. It was led from its formation until June 2025 by Vuyolwethu Zungula. However, there were claims that former president Jacob Zuma's faction of the African National Congress had a hand in its formation.

Ahead of the 2019 election, a key Zuma ally, Mzwanele Manyi, joined the party, though he would later leave in 2023.

Following the 2024 South African general election, the party joined the Progressive Caucus, a left-wing parliamentary faction which includes the Economic Freedom Fighters and uMkhonto weSizwe (MK) parties. In March 2025, ATM and MK announced they would be entering a pact to work together electorally and in parliament.

In June 2025, Zungula was replaced as president by Caesar Nongqunga, who was also Chief Apostle of the Twelve Apostles Church in Christ. Zungula continued as party leader in parliament.

== Policy ==
In January 2019, it was announced that the party, if brought to power, would return the death penalty and scrap low pass marks in public schools.

Mzwanele Manyi, the former chief of policy and strategy for the ATM, further states that the party plans to bring about capital punishment regardless of the constitution not consenting to such matters. Manyi claims that this is due to South Africa being abused as a "haven" for people who commit crimes and need a place to evade the law.

In December 2021, the party said that it opposed mandatory vaccinations against COVID-19.

== Election results ==
The party contested its first elections in 2019, winning two seats nationally, as well as one each in the Eastern Cape and KwaZulu-Natal legislatures.

=== National Assembly elections ===
Election	Party leader	Total votes	Share of vote	Seats	+/–	Government
2019	Vuyolwethu Zungula	76,830	0.44%	2 / 400	New	Opposition
2024	Vuyolwethu Zungula	63,554	0.40% (Note: From 2024, seats in the National Assembly are determined by a combination of the national ballot, and the nine regional ballots. Only the national ballot figures are shown here.)	2 / 400	0	Opposition

=== Provincial elections ===
Election	Eastern Cape		Free State		Gauteng		Kwazulu-Natal		Limpopo		Mpumalanga		North-West		Northern Cape		Western Cape	
Election	%	Seats	%	Seats	%	Seats	%	Seats	%	Seats	%	Seats	%	Seats	%	Seats	%	Seats
2019	1.52%	1/63	0.78%	0/30	0.25%	0/73	0.49%	1/80	0.28%	0/49	0.61%	0/30	0.39%	0/33	0.24%	0/30	0.24%	0/42
2024	1.55%	1/73	0.71%	0/30	0.29%	0/80	0.18%	0/80	0.09%	0/64	0.43%	0/51	0.16%	0/38	0.10%	0/30	0.28%	0/42

=== Municipal elections ===
Election	Votes	%	Seats
2021	189,943	0.62%	53
