= Organic Humanity Movement =

Political party in South Africa

- Founder: Lauren Bernardo
- Founded: 2017
- Ideology: Non-partisan democracy Libertarian conservatism
- National Assembly seats: 0 / 400
- Provincial Legislatures: 0 / 430

Website
- www.ohm.org.za

The Organic Humanity Movement (OHM) is a South African political party founded by Lauren Evanthia Bernardo at the end of 2017, after three years of involvement in politics and local government.

The party focuses on individual liberties and intends to change the constitution to abolish political parties, permitting only individuals to stand, each paying their own election deposit and collecting the required number of signatures. It encourages gun ownership, describing attempts to reduce guns as "in line with the United Nations Agenda 21". It is supportive of homeschooling, and is against the state teaching of sexuality and gender. It describes itself as supportive of parents and says that "The minister of Basic Education declared war on our children when she said that children are a government’s responsibility. We need to ready ourselves for the biggest battle this country has ever seen."

== Election results ==
=== National Assembly elections ===
Election	Party leader	Total votes	Share of vote	Seats	+/–	Government
2024	Lauren Bernardo	5,241	0.03% (Note: From 2024, seats in the National Assembly are determined by a combination of the national ballot, and the nine regional ballots. Only the national ballot figures are shown here.)	0 / 400	New	Extra-parliamentary

=== Municipal elections ===
The party contested the 2021 South African municipal elections, failing to win a seat.

The party has also contested a number of by-elections, failing to win a seat.
