= Hope4SA =

Christian political party in South Africa

#Hope4SA
- Abbreviation: #HOPE4SA
- Chief Servant Leader: John Mathuhle
- Deputy Servant Leader: Gerrie Bester
- Founded: 10 January 2024; 2 years ago
- Ideology: Christian right Social conservatism
- Religion: Christianity

Website
- https://www.hope4sa.org.za/

#Hope4SA is a South African political party established by John Mathuhle in Bloemfontein in January 2024.

#Hope4SA is a Christian political party, is anti-abortion, against same-sex marriage, in favour of Christian religious education in state schools and is pro-Israel.

The party is an offshoot of Time2Rise, which describes itself as a movement, beyond the realm of party politics. Former Chief Justice of South Africa Mogoeng Mogoeng spoke at a Time2Rise event in 2023, stating that he would some day become South Africa's president, without contesting through an electoral process.

According to its official manifesto, Hope4SA calls for the establishment of religious courts to adjudicate certain matters according to biblical principles.

== Election results ==
The party stood candidates in the 2024 South African general election but did not win any seats.

=== National Assembly elections ===
| Election | Total votes | Share of vote | Seats | +/– | Government |
|---|---|---|---|---|---|
| 2024 | 27,206 | 0.17% (Note: From 2024, seats in the National Assembly are determined by a combination of the national ballot, and the nine regional ballots. Only the national ballot figures are shown here.) | 0 / 400 | New | Extra-parliamentary |

=== Provincial elections ===
| Election | Eastern Cape | | Free State | | Gauteng | | Kwazulu-Natal | | Limpopo | | Mpumalanga | | North-West | | Northern Cape | | Western Cape | |
| Election | % | Seats | % | Seats | % | Seats | % | Seats | % | Seats | % | Seats | % | Seats | % | Seats | % | Seats |
|---|---|---|---|---|---|---|---|---|---|---|---|---|---|---|---|---|---|---|
| 2024 | | | | | 0.22 | 0/80 | | | | | | | | | 0.44 | 0/30 | | |

== See also ==
- South African politics
