= George Local Municipality elections =

Local elections in the Western Cape, South Africa

The George Local Municipality council consists of fifty-three members elected by mixed-member proportional representation. Twenty-seven councillors are elected by first-past-the-post voting in twenty-seven wards, while the remaining twenty-six are chosen from party lists so that the total number of party representatives is proportional to the number of votes received.

In the election of 1 November 2021 no party obtained a majority of seats on the council. The Democratic Alliance (DA) did, however, win the largest amount of seats. The DA then formed a majority coalition government with the Freedom Front Plus (FF Plus) and the African Christian Democratic Party (ACDP) to govern the municipality.

In the election of 1 November 2026 the Democratic Alliance obtained a majority of seats on the council.

== Results ==
The following table shows the composition of the council after past elections.

Event	ACDP	ANC	DA	EFF	FF+	GOOD	PA	PBI	Other	Total
2000 election	—	14	17	—	—	—	—	—	4	35
2006 election	1	17	18	—	1	—	—	—	2	39
2011 election	1	19	25	—	0	—	—	1	3	49
2016 election	1	16	29	1	1	—	—	2	3	53
2021 election	1	10	26	2	4	6	1	5	0	55
2026 election	1	8	28	1	4	1	11	1	0	55

== December 2000 election ==
The following table shows the results of the 2000 election.

Party	Ward			List			Total seats
Party	Votes	%	Seats	Votes	%	Seats	Total seats
Democratic Alliance	13,781	47.10	8	14,182	48.72	9	17
African National Congress	11,534	39.42	9	11,505	39.52	5	14
George Community Initiative	2,381	8.14	1	2,137	7.34	2	3
Community Initiative	1,090	3.73	0	971	3.34	1	1
United Democratic Movement	197	0.67	0	316	1.09	0	0
Independent candidates	278	0.95	0				0
Total	29,261	100.00	18	29,111	100.00	17	35
Valid votes	29,261	98.46		29,111	97.91		
Invalid/blank votes	457	1.54		620	2.09		
Total votes	29,718	100.00		29,731	100.00		
Registered voters/turnout	55,293	53.75		55,293	53.77		

=== October 2002 floor crossing ===
In terms of the Eighth Amendment of the Constitution and the judgment of the Constitutional Court in United Democratic Movement v President of the Republic of South Africa and Others, in the period from 8–22 October 2002 councillors had the opportunity to cross the floor to a different political party without losing their seats.

In the George council, the three councillors of the George Community Initiative crossed to the Democratic Alliance.

Party	Seats before	Net change	Seats after
Democratic Alliance	17	▲3	20
African National Congress	14	0	14
Community Initiative	1	0	1
George Community Initiative	3	▼3	0

=== September 2004 floor crossing ===
Another floor-crossing period occurred on 1–15 September 2004, in which two councillors crossed from the Democratic Alliance to the African National Congress.

Party	Seats before	Net change	Seats after
Democratic Alliance	20	▼2	18
African National Congress	14	▲2	16
Community Initiative	1	0	1

== March 2006 election ==
The following table shows the results of the 2006 election.

Party	Ward			List			Total seats
Party	Votes	%	Seats	Votes	%	Seats	Total seats
Democratic Alliance	17,017	45.61	13	17,266	46.26	5	18
African National Congress	16,151	43.29	7	16,035	42.96	10	17
Independent Democrats	1,611	4.32	0	1,612	4.32	2	2
African Christian Democratic Party	605	1.62	0	572	1.53	1	1
Freedom Front Plus	533	1.43	0	512	1.37	1	1
Independent Civic Organisation of South Africa	423	1.13	0	398	1.07	0	0
George Independent Forum	413	1.11	0	367	0.98	0	0
Community Initiative	299	0.80	0	283	0.76	0	0
United Democratic Movement	112	0.30	0	278	0.74	0	0
Independent candidates	143	0.38	0				0
Total	37,307	100.00	20	37,323	100.00	19	39
Valid votes	37,307	98.84		37,323	98.82		
Invalid/blank votes	439	1.16		447	1.18		
Total votes	37,746	100.00		37,770	100.00		
Registered voters/turnout	68,604	55.02		68,604	55.06		

=== By-elections from March 2006 to May 2011 ===
The following by-elections were held to fill vacant ward seats in the period between the elections in March 2006 and May 2011.

Date	Ward	Party of the previous councillor	Party of the newly elected councillor
15 November 2006	3	Democratic Alliance	Democratic Alliance (Note: Elected uncontested as no other candidates were nominated.)
5 December 2007	3	Democratic Alliance	Democratic Alliance
21 May 2008	5	Democratic Alliance	Democratic Alliance
21 May 2008	8	Democratic Alliance	Independent Democrats
6 May 2009	1	Democratic Alliance	Democratic Alliance
24 June 2009	19	Democratic Alliance	Independent

== May 2011 election ==
The following table shows the results of the 2011 election.

Party	Ward			List			Total seats
Party	Votes	%	Seats	Votes	%	Seats	Total seats
Democratic Alliance	28,155	50.55	16	28,491	51.01	9	25
African National Congress	21,720	39.00	9	22,156	39.66	10	19
Plaaslike Besorgde Inwoners	1,668	2.99	0	1,573	2.82	1	1
Independent Civic Organisation of South Africa	927	1.66	0	851	1.52	1	1
African Christian Democratic Party	786	1.41	0	696	1.25	1	1
George Independent Ratepayers Forum	813	1.46	0	568	1.02	1	1
Congress of the People	511	0.92	0	515	0.92	1	1
Freedom Front Plus	436	0.78	0	370	0.66	0	0
National People's Party	250	0.45	0	237	0.42	0	0
South Cape Community Forum	134	0.24	0	113	0.20	0	0
Independent candidates	209	0.38	0				0
United Democratic Movement	75	0.13	0	134	0.24	0	0
Ou Pacaltsdorp Inwoners Vereniging				155	0.28	0	0
African People's Convention	14	0.03	0				0
Total	55,698	100.00	25	55,859	100.00	24	49
Valid votes	55,698	98.69		55,859	99.02		
Invalid/blank votes	737	1.31		555	0.98		
Total votes	56,435	100.00		56,414	100.00		
Registered voters/turnout	90,601	62.29		90,601	62.27		

=== By-elections from May 2011 to August 2016 ===
The following by-elections were held to fill vacant ward seats in the period between the elections in May 2011 and August 2016.

Date	Ward	Party of the previous councillor	Party of the newly elected councillor
22 May 2013	6	Democratic Alliance	Democratic Alliance
3 July 2013	14	Democratic Alliance	Democratic Alliance
7 August 2013	1	Democratic Alliance	Democratic Alliance

== August 2016 election ==
The following table shows the results of the 2016 election.

Party	Ward			List			Total seats
Party	Votes	%	Seats	Votes	%	Seats	Total seats
Democratic Alliance	33,098	55.13	18	33,321	55.74	11	29
African National Congress	17,633	29.37	9	17,348	29.02	7	16
Plaaslike Besorgde Inwoners	1,983	3.30	0	2,024	3.39	2	2
Economic Freedom Fighters	1,514	2.52	0	1,485	2.48	1	1
Independent Civic Organisation of South Africa	1,483	2.47	0	1,505	2.52	1	1
Freedom Front Plus	1,029	1.71	0	955	1.60	1	1
African Christian Democratic Party	877	1.46	0	782	1.31	1	1
African Independent Congress	693	1.15	0	850	1.42	1	1
South Africa Civics	724	1.21	0	755	1.26	1	1
Christian Democrats	188	0.31	0	208	0.35	0	0
Independent candidates	394	0.66	0				0
Democratic New Civic Association	156	0.26	0	211	0.35	0	0
South African Religious Civic Organisation	134	0.22	0	138	0.23	0	0
George Independent Ratepayers Forum	93	0.15	0	92	0.15	0	0
Christian United Movement S.A.	30	0.05	0	57	0.10	0	0
Ubuntu Party	3	0.00	0	45	0.08	0	0
Total	60,032	100.00	27	59,776	100.00	26	53
Valid votes	60,032	98.65		59,776	98.51		
Invalid/blank votes	823	1.35		904	1.49		
Total votes	60,855	100.00		60,680	100.00		
Registered voters/turnout	100,886	60.32		100,886	60.15		

=== By-elections from August 2016 to November 2021 ===
The following by-elections were held to fill vacant ward seats in the period between the elections in August 2016 and November 2021.

Date	Ward	Party of the previous councillor	Party of the newly elected councillor
1 Feb 2017	11	Democratic Alliance	African National Congress
1 Feb 2017	25	African National Congress	African National Congress
25 Apr 2018	18	Democratic Alliance	Democratic Alliance
21 Nov 2018	3	Democratic Alliance	Democratic Alliance
10 Apr 2019	18	Democratic Alliance	Democratic Alliance
17 Jul 2019	20	Democratic Alliance	Democratic Alliance
11 Nov 2020 (Note: By-election was delayed due to the COVID-19 pandemic.)	8	Democratic Alliance	Democratic Alliance
11 Nov 2020	14	Democratic Alliance	Democratic Alliance
11 Nov 2020	17	Democratic Alliance	Democratic Alliance
11 Nov 2020	27	Democratic Alliance	Good

== November 2021 election ==
The following table shows the results of the 2021 election.

Party	Ward			List			Total seats
Party	Votes	%	Seats	Votes	%	Seats	Total seats
Democratic Alliance	24,875	46.01	16	25,088	46.89	10	26
African National Congress	9,709	17.96	9	9,439	17.64	1	10
Good	5,665	10.48	3	5,566	10.40	3	6
Plaaslike Besorgde Inwoners	5,385	9.96	0	5,275	9.86	5	5
Freedom Front Plus	3,690	6.82	0	3,451	6.45	4	4
Economic Freedom Fighters	1,605	2.97	0	1,553	2.90	2	2
Patriotic Alliance	814	1.51	0	913	1.71	1	1
African Christian Democratic Party	851	1.57	0	821	1.53	1	1
Cape Independence Party	268	0.50	0	265	0.50	0	0
Independent Civic Organisation of South Africa	266	0.49	0	266	0.50	0	0
African Independent Congress	107	0.20	0	197	0.37	0	0
African Transformation Movement	150	0.28	0	152	0.28	0	0
United Independent Movement	120	0.22	0	116	0.22	0	0
Active United Front	103	0.19	0	99	0.19	0	0
The Organic Humanity Movement	102	0.19	0	97	0.18	0	0
Compatriots of South Africa	91	0.17	0	79	0.15	0	0
African People's Convention	84	0.16	0	53	0.10	0	0
Independent candidates	137	0.25	0				0
Africa Restoration Alliance	45	0.08	0	46	0.09	0	0
Spectrum National Party	3	0.01	0	25	0.05	0	0
African Freedom Revolution				7	0.01	0	0
Total	54,070	100.00	28	53,508	100.00	27	55
Valid votes	54,070	98.92		53,508	98.84		
Invalid/blank votes	588	1.08		627	1.16		
Total votes	54,658	100.00		54,135	100.00		
Registered voters/turnout	106,525	51.31		106,525	50.82		

=== By-elections from November 2021 ===
The following by-elections were held to fill vacant ward seats in the period since the election in November 2021.

Date	Ward	Party of the previous councillor	Party of the newly elected councillor
19 Jul 2023	16	Good	Democratic Alliance
19 Jul 2023	20	Good	Patriotic Alliance
19 Jul 2023	27	Good	Democratic Alliance
14 Feb 2024	8	Democratic Alliance	Patriotic Alliance
23 Oct 2024	20	Patriotic Alliance	Patriotic Alliance
21 Jan 2026	17	Democratic Alliance	Patriotic Alliance
21 Jan 2026	27	Democratic Alliance	Patriotic Alliance
11 Feb 2026	16	Democratic Alliance	Patriotic Alliance
30 April 2026	25	African National Congress	Democratic Alliance

The three Good ward councillors (the party's only ward councillors in the country) resigned, with two joining the Democratic Alliance (DA) and one of the three, Richard Hector, a two-term ward councillor, attempting to reverse his decision. The Independent Electoral Commission (IEC) declared that he had resigned, and so three by-elections needed to be held. The by-elections were marred by allegations of voter registration fraud, with Good claiming that, in one instance, 188 people were registered at the same address in spite of only two people living there. The IEC dismissed the claims and the by-elections went ahead. Good lost all three seats, with two going to the DA, and one to the Patriotic Alliance (PA).

As a result, the DA, which governed in coalition with Freedom Front Plus (FF+), gained a majority of 28 seats (up from 26) of the 55 available seats, Good fell to 3 from 6, and the PA increased from 1 to 2.

The DA lost its majority after the by-election on 14 February 2024 when it lost ward 8 to the PA, and, following further losses, as of February 2026, governs with the support of the FF+ and ACDP.

The council composition as of 12 February 2026 is shown below.

Party	Ward			List			Total seats
Party	Votes	%	Seats	Votes	%	Seats	Total seats
Democratic Alliance			14			10	24
African National Congress			9			1	10
Patriotic Alliance			5			1	6
Plaaslike Besorgde Inwoners			0			5	5
Freedom Front Plus			0			4	4
Good			0			3	3
Economic Freedom Fighters			0			2	2
African Christian Democratic Party			0			1	1
Total			28			27	55

== November 2026 election ==
The following table shows the results of the 2026 election.

Party	Ward			List			Total seats
Party	Votes	%	Seats	Votes	%	Seats	Total seats
Democratic Alliance	35,215	49.91	15	35,715	50.60	13	28
Patriotic Alliance	13,600	19.27	7	13,605	19.28	4	11
African National Congress	10,743	15.23	6	10,697	15.16	2	8
Freedom Front Plus	5,253	7.44	0	4,973	7.05	4	4
Economic Freedom Fighters	1,639	2.32	0	1,623	2.30	1	1
African Christian Democratic Party	1,049	1.49	0	956	1.35	1	1
Plaaslike Besorgde Inwoners	774	1.10	0	662	0.94	1	1
Good	529	0.75	0	701	0.99	1	1
African Transformation Movement	308	0.44	0	396	0.56	0	0
People's Movement for Change	241	0.34	0	226	0.32	0	0
uMkhonto weSizwe Party	201	0.28	0	266	0.38	0	0
South African Communist Party	256	0.36	0	203	0.29	0	0
Cape Independence Party	133	0.19	0	126	0.18	0	0
Africa Restoration Alliance	79	0.11	0	85	0.12	0	0
Organic Humanity Movement	77	0.11	0	80	0.11	0	0
Independent candidates	155	0.22	0				0
National Coloured Congress	78	0.11	0	73	0.10	0	0
Pan Africanist Congress of Azania	79	0.11	0	70	0.10	0	0
Afrika Mayibuye Movement	58	0.08	0	42	0.06	0	0
Independent Ratepayers Association of SA	66	0.09	0	28	0.04	0	0
Ikhwezi Political Movement	26	0.04	0	53	0.08	0	0
Total	70,559	100.00	28	70,580	100.00	27	55
Valid votes	70,559	99.23		70,580	99.20		
Invalid/blank votes	551	0.77		570	0.80		
Total votes	71,110	100.00		71,150	100.00		
Registered voters/turnout	123,810	57.43		123,810	57.47		
