= Knysna Local Municipality elections =

Local elections in the Western Cape, South Africa

The Knysna Local Municipality council consists of twenty-one members elected by mixed-member proportional representation. Eleven councillors are elected by first-past-the-post voting in eleven wards, while the remaining ten are chosen from party lists so that the total number of party representatives is proportional to the number of votes received.

In the election of 4 November 2026 no party obtained a majority of seats on the council.

== Results ==
The following table shows the composition of the council after past elections.

Event	ANC	DA	EFF	IND	PA	Other	Total
2000 election	6	7	—	1	—	2	16
2004 floor-crossing	7	5	—	2	—	2	16
2006 election	7	5	—	0	—	4	16
2007 floor-crossing	9	5	—	0	—	2	16
2011 election	7	10	—	1	—	1	19
2016 election	7	10	0	1	—	3	21
2021 election	7	8	1	0	2	3	21
2026 election	4	9	1	0	2	5	21

== December 2000 election ==
The following table shows the results of the 2000 election.

Party	Ward			List			Total seats
Party	Votes	%	Seats	Votes	%	Seats	Total seats
Democratic Alliance	6,361	42.44	4	6,580	43.62	3	7
African National Congress	5,241	34.97	2	5,476	36.30	4	6
Knysna Community Forum	1,958	13.06	1	2,737	18.14	1	2
Independent candidates	1,213	8.09	1				1
United Democratic Movement	215	1.43	0	293	1.94	0	0
Total	14,988	100.00	8	15,086	100.00	8	16
Valid votes	14,988	98.44		15,086	98.31		
Invalid/blank votes	237	1.56		259	1.69		
Total votes	15,225	100.00		15,345	100.00		
Registered voters/turnout	23,465	64.88		23,465	65.40		

=== By-elections from December 2000 to September 2004 ===
The following by-elections were held to fill vacant ward seats in the period between the election in December 2000 and the floor crossing period in September 2004.

Date	Ward	Party of the previous councillor	Party of the newly elected councillor
24 July 2002	3	Democratic Alliance	Democratic Alliance

=== September 2004 floor crossing ===
In terms of the Eighth Amendment of the Constitution, in the period from 1–15 September 2004 councillors had the opportunity to cross the floor to a different political party without losing their seats. In the Knysna council, one councillor crossed from the Democratic Alliance (DA) to the African National Congress, while another councillor left the DA to sit as an independent.

Party	Seats before	Net change	Seats after
African National Congress	6	▲1	7
Democratic Alliance	7	▼2	5
Knysna Community Forum	2	0	2
Independent	1	▲1	2

=== By-elections from September 2004 to February 2006 ===
The following by-elections were held to fill vacant ward seats in the period between the floor crossing periods in September 2004 and the election in March 2006.

Date	Ward	Party of the previous councillor	Party of the newly elected councillor
22 September 2004	8	Knysna Community Forum	African National Congress

== March 2006 election ==
The following table shows the results of the 2006 election.

Party	Ward			List			Total seats
Party	Votes	%	Seats	Votes	%	Seats	Total seats
African National Congress	6,468	40.01	5	6,447	40.03	2	7
Democratic Alliance	4,710	29.14	2	4,813	29.88	3	5
Knysna Community Forum	1,778	11.00	1	1,943	12.06	1	2
Independent candidates	1,959	12.12	0				0
Independent Civic Organisation of South Africa				1,663	10.32	1	1
Independent Democrats	627	3.88	0	651	4.04	1	1
African Christian Democratic Party	426	2.64	0	421	2.61	0	0
United Independent Front	197	1.22	0	169	1.05	0	0
Total	16,165	100.00	8	16,107	100.00	8	16
Valid votes	16,165	98.61		16,107	98.34		
Invalid/blank votes	228	1.39		272	1.66		
Total votes	16,393	100.00		16,379	100.00		
Registered voters/turnout	27,850	58.86		27,850	58.81		

=== September 2007 floor crossing ===
The final floor-crossing period occurred on 1–15 September 2007; floor-crossing was subsequently abolished in 2008 by the Fifteenth Amendment of the Constitution. In the Knysna council, the two councillors of the Knysna Community Forum crossed to the African National Congress, and the single councillor of the Independent Civic Organisation crossed to the National People's Party.

Party	Seats before	Net change	Seats after
African National Congress	7	▲2	9
Democratic Alliance	5	0	5
Independent Democrats	1	0	1
National People's Party	—	▲1	1
Knysna Community Forum	2	▼2	0
Independent Civic Organisation of South Africa	1	▼1	0

== May 2011 election ==
The following table shows the results of the 2011 election.

Party	Ward			List			Total seats
Party	Votes	%	Seats	Votes	%	Seats	Total seats
Democratic Alliance	11,736	49.54	5	11,844	51.56	5	10
African National Congress	8,764	36.99	4	9,111	39.66	3	7
Congress of the People	1,601	6.76	0	1,596	6.95	1	1
Independent candidates	1,132	4.78	1				1
African Christian Democratic Party	353	1.49	0	360	1.57	0	0
Cape Party	104	0.44	0	61	0.27	0	0
Total	23,690	100.00	10	22,972	100.00	9	19
Valid votes	23,690	98.93		22,972	96.92		
Invalid/blank votes	257	1.07		730	3.08		
Total votes	23,947	100.00		23,702	100.00		
Registered voters/turnout	36,332	65.91		36,332	65.24		

=== By-elections from May 2011 to August 2016 ===
The following by-elections were held to fill vacant ward seats in the period between the elections in May 2011 and August 2016.

Date	Ward	Party of the previous councillor	Party of the newly elected councillor
2 July 2014	5	Democratic Alliance	Democratic Alliance
22 July 2015	9	Democratic Alliance	Democratic Alliance
22 July 2015	10	Democratic Alliance	Democratic Alliance

== August 2016 election ==
The following table shows the results of the 2016 election.

Party	Ward			List			Total seats
Party	Votes	%	Seats	Votes	%	Seats	Total seats
Democratic Alliance	12,098	48.11	6	12,489	51.15	4	10
African National Congress	7,777	30.93	3	8,153	33.39	4	7
Congress of the People	1,430	5.69	1	1,402	5.74	0	1
Independent candidates	1,462	5.81	1				1
Knysna Unity Congress	535	2.13	0	503	2.06	1	1
African Christian Democratic Party	462	1.84	0	436	1.79	1	1
Economic Freedom Fighters	427	1.70	0	420	1.72	0	0
Independent Civic Organisation of South Africa	350	1.39	0	350	1.43	0	0
African Independent Congress	164	0.65	0	336	1.38	0	0
Freedom Front Plus	209	0.83	0	175	0.72	0	0
Ubuntu Party	111	0.44	0	52	0.21	0	0
South African Religious Civic Organisation	36	0.14	0	36	0.15	0	0
Plaaslike Besorgde Inwoners	25	0.10	0	44	0.18	0	0
Democratic New Civic Association	49	0.19	0				0
South Africa Civics	12	0.05	0	22	0.09	0	0
Total	25,147	100.00	11	24,418	100.00	10	21
Valid votes	25,147	98.87		24,418	96.50		
Invalid/blank votes	287	1.13		886	3.50		
Total votes	25,434	100.00		25,304	100.00		
Registered voters/turnout	40,014	63.56		40,014	63.24		

=== By-elections from August 2016 to November 2021 ===
The following by-elections were held to fill vacant ward seats in the period between the elections in August 2016 and November 2021.

Date	Ward	Party of the previous councillor	Party of the newly elected councillor
24 October 2018	8	African National Congress	African National Congress
13 February 2019	4	Independent	African National Congress
21 August 2019	5	Democratic Alliance	Democratic Alliance
4 December 2019	11	Democratic Alliance	Democratic Alliance
11 November 2020 (Note: By-election was delayed due to the COVID-19 pandemic.)	9	Democratic Alliance	Democratic Alliance
11 November 2020	10	Democratic Alliance	Democratic Alliance
21 April 2021	11	Democratic Alliance	African National Congress

== November 2021 election ==
The following table shows the results of the 2021 election.

Party	Ward			List			Total seats
Party	Votes	%	Seats	Votes	%	Seats	Total seats
Democratic Alliance	8,176	34.73	5	8,421	36.15	3	8
African National Congress	7,660	32.54	6	7,889	33.87	1	7
Knysna Independent Movement	1,901	8.07	0	1,797	7.71	2	2
Patriotic Alliance	1,725	7.33	0	1,729	7.42	2	2
Plaaslike Besorgde Inwoners	1,109	4.71	0	1,052	4.52	1	1
Economic Freedom Fighters	558	2.37	0	610	2.62	1	1
Freedom Front Plus	542	2.30	0	451	1.94	0	0
Good	414	1.76	0	393	1.69	0	0
Independent candidates	573	2.43	0				0
African Christian Democratic Party	208	0.88	0	188	0.81	0	0
Knysna Unity Congress	160	0.68	0	185	0.79	0	0
Cape Independence Party	155	0.66	0	154	0.66	0	0
Active United Front	95	0.40	0	146	0.63	0	0
United Independent Movement	70	0.30	0	54	0.23	0	0
Congress of the People	62	0.26	0	57	0.24	0	0
The Organic Humanity Movement	28	0.12	0	47	0.20	0	0
African Transformation Movement	26	0.11	0	39	0.17	0	0
Africa Restoration Alliance	25	0.11	0	28	0.12	0	0
Dagga Party	16	0.07	0	28	0.12	0	0
Independent Civic Organisation of South Africa	11	0.05	0	27	0.12	0	0
Knysna Social Democratic Party	28	0.12	0				0
Total	23,542	100.00	11	23,295	100.00	10	21
Valid votes	23,542	98.49		23,295	98.07		
Invalid/blank votes	361	1.51		458	1.93		
Total votes	23,903	100.00		23,753	100.00		
Registered voters/turnout	42,790	55.86		42,790	55.51		

=== By-elections from November 2021 ===
The following by-elections were held to fill vacant ward seats in the period since the election in November 2021.

Date	Ward	Party of the previous councillor	Party of the newly elected councillor
25 Jun 2025	8	African National Congress	African National Congress
20 Aug 2025	3	African National Congress	African National Congress

== November 2026 election ==
The following table shows the results of the 2026 election.

Party	Ward			List			Total seats
Party	Votes	%	Seats	Votes	%	Seats	Total seats
Democratic Alliance	13,016	43.55	7	13,496	45.27	2	9
African National Congress	5,695	19.05	4	5,477	18.37	0	4
Patriotic Alliance	3,012	10.08	0	2,941	9.87	2	2
South African Communist Party	1,742	5.83	0	1,720	5.77	1	1
Freedom Front Plus	1,363	4.56	0	1,306	4.38	1	1
Knysna Civic Alliance	857	2.87	0	832	2.79	1	1
People's Movement for Change	828	2.77	0	785	2.63	1	1
Choose CX	833	2.79	0	698	2.34	1	1
Economic Freedom Fighters	595	1.99	0	616	2.07	1	1
Knysna First	480	1.61	0	530	1.78	0	0
United Progressive People Alliance	453	1.52	0	533	1.79	0	0
Knysna Independent Movement	350	1.17	0	273	0.92	0	0
Plaaslike Besorgde Inwoners	196	0.66	0	211	0.71	0	0
African Christian Democratic Party	114	0.38	0	120	0.40	0	0
National Coloured Congress	72	0.24	0	56	0.19	0	0
uMkhonto weSizwe Party	46	0.15	0	52	0.17	0	0
United Democratic Movement	93	0.31	0				0
Good	32	0.11	0	40	0.13	0	0
Cape Independence Party	36	0.12	0	26	0.09	0	0
One Love Alliance	22	0.07	0	29	0.10	0	0
Organic Humanity Movement	23	0.08	0	26	0.09	0	0
Ikhwezi Political Movement	14	0.05	0	23	0.08	0	0
Afrika Mayibuye Movement	17	0.06	0	19	0.06	0	0
Total	29,889	100.00	11	29,809	100.00	10	21
Valid votes	29,889	99.14		29,809	99.16		
Invalid/blank votes	258	0.86		253	0.84		
Total votes	30,147	100.00		30,062	100.00		
Registered voters/turnout	48,955	61.58		48,955	61.41		
