= Oudtshoorn Local Municipality elections =

Local elections in Western Cape, South Africa

The Oudtshoorn Local Municipality council consists of twenty-five members elected by mixed-member proportional representation. Thirteen councillors are elected by first-past-the-post voting in thirteen wards, while the remaining twelve are chosen from party lists so that the total number of party representatives is proportional to the number of votes received.

In the election of 1 November 2021 no party obtained a majority of seats on the council. The African National Congress (ANC) formed a minority coalition with the Independent Civic Organisation of South Africa (ICOSA) and the Oudtshoorn Gemeenskap Inisiatief (OGI). At the inaugural council meeting on 17 November, 24-year-old councillor Chad Louw of the ANC was elected mayor with ICOSA's Vlancio Donson as deputy mayor and the OGI's Colin Sylvester as speaker.

In the election of 4 November 2026, the Democratic Alliance (DA) won a plurality of ten seats on the council.

== Results ==
The following table shows the composition of the council after past elections.

Event	ANC	DA	FF+	ICOSA	PA	Other	Total
2000 election	10	10	—	—	—	3	23
2002 floor-crossing	10	7	—	—	—	6	23
2004 floor-crossing	15	7	—	—	—	1	23
2006 election	8	7	—	—	—	8	23
2007 floor-crossing	8	7	—	—	—	8	23
2011 election	11	11	—	1	—	2	25
2016 election	7	14	0	2	—	2	25
2021 election	8	7	3	2	1	4	25
2026 election	5	10	3	1	3	3	25

== December 2000 election ==
The following table shows the results of the 2000 election.

Party	Ward			List			Total seats
Party	Votes	%	Seats	Votes	%	Seats	Total seats
Democratic Alliance	8,664	44.53	4	9,054	46.38	6	10
African National Congress	8,797	45.21	8	8,770	44.93	2	10
Oudtshoorn Aksie 2000	1,328	6.83	0	1,174	6.01	2	2
United Independent Front	602	3.09	0	522	2.67	1	1
Independent candidates	66	0.34	0				0
Total	19,457	100.00	12	19,520	100.00	11	23
Valid votes	19,457	97.74		19,520	98.12		
Invalid/blank votes	450	2.26		374	1.88		
Total votes	19,907	100.00		19,894	100.00		
Registered voters/turnout	34,824	57.16		34,824	57.13		

=== October 2002 floor crossing ===
In terms of the Eighth Amendment of the Constitution and the judgment of the Constitutional Court in United Democratic Movement v President of the Republic of South Africa and Others, in the period from 8–22 October 2002 councillors had the opportunity to cross the floor to a different political party without losing their seats.

In the Oudtshoorn council, five councillors from the Democratic Alliance (DA) crossed to the New National Party (NNP), which had formerly been part of the DA. The single councillor of the United Independent Front also crossed to the NNP, while the two councillors of Oudtshoorn Aksie 2000 crossed to the DA.

Party	Seats before	Net change	Seats after
African National Congress	10	0	10
Democratic Alliance	10	▼3	7
New National Party	—	▲6	6
Oudtshoorn Aksie 2000	2	▼2	0
United Independent Front	1	▼1	0

=== September 2004 floor crossing ===
Another floor-crossing period occurred on 1–15 September 2004, in which five councillors crossed from the NNP to the African National Congress, while the sixth NNP councillor crossed to the Freedom Front Plus.

Party	Seats before	Net change	Seats after
African National Congress	10	▲5	15
Democratic Alliance	7	0	7
New National Party	6	▼6	0
Freedom Front Plus	—	▲1	1

=== By-elections from September 2004 to February 2006 ===
The following by-elections were held to fill vacant ward seats in the period between the floor crossing periods in September 2004 and the election in March 2006.

Date	Ward	Party of the previous councillor	Party of the newly elected councillor
27 July 2005	8	African National Congress	African National Congress

== March 2006 election ==
The following table shows the results of the 2006 election.

Party	Ward			List			Total seats
Party	Votes	%	Seats	Votes	%	Seats	Total seats
African National Congress	7,613	34.58	4	7,455	33.87	4	8
Democratic Alliance	6,500	29.52	5	6,493	29.50	2	7
Independent Democrats	5,708	25.93	3	5,744	26.10	3	6
Oudtshoorn Civic Association	1,596	7.25	0	1,637	7.44	2	2
Freedom Front Plus	257	1.17	0	288	1.31	0	0
African Christian Democratic Party	228	1.04	0	221	1.00	0	0
Inkatha Freedom Party	74	0.34	0	72	0.33	0	0
United Independent Front	41	0.19	0	101	0.46	0	0
Total	22,017	100.00	12	22,011	100.00	11	23
Valid votes	22,017	98.91		22,011	98.82		
Invalid/blank votes	242	1.09		262	1.18		
Total votes	22,259	100.00		22,273	100.00		
Registered voters/turnout	40,710	54.68		40,710	54.71		

=== September 2007 floor crossing ===
The final floor-crossing period occurred on 1–15 September 2007; floor-crossing was subsequently abolished in 2008 by the Fifteenth Amendment of the Constitution. In the Stellenbosch council, the two councillors of the Oudtshoorn Civic Association crossed to the National People's Party.

Party	Seats before	Net change	Seats after
African National Congress	8	0	8
Democratic Alliance	7	0	7
Independent Democrats	6	0	6
National People's Party	—	▲2	2
Oudtshoorn Civic Association	2	▼2	0

=== By-elections from September 2007 to May 2011 ===
The following by-elections were held to fill vacant ward seats in the period between the floor crossing period in September 2007 and the election in May 2011.

Date	Ward	Party of the previous councillor	Party of the newly elected councillor
6 October 2010	5	Independent Democrats	African National Congress (Note: The former councillor was re-elected to the ward on behalf of a different party.)
6 October 2010	12	Independent Democrats	African National Congress

== May 2011 election ==
The following table shows the results of the 2011 election.

Party	Ward			List			Total seats
Party	Votes	%	Seats	Votes	%	Seats	Total seats
Democratic Alliance	13,471	46.09	6	13,587	46.28	5	11
African National Congress	12,362	42.30	7	12,499	42.57	4	11
Congress of the People	891	3.05	0	881	3.00	1	1
Independent Civic Organisation of South Africa	868	2.97	0	853	2.91	1	1
National People's Party	658	2.25	0	658	2.24	1	1
African Christian Democratic Party	511	1.75	0	476	1.62	0	0
South African Progressive Civic Organisation	267	0.91	0	268	0.91	0	0
Freedom Front Plus	200	0.68	0	137	0.47	0	0
Total	29,228	100.00	13	29,359	100.00	12	25
Valid votes	29,228	98.72		29,359	98.80		
Invalid/blank votes	380	1.28		357	1.20		
Total votes	29,608	100.00		29,716	100.00		
Registered voters/turnout	47,736	62.02		47,736	62.25		

=== By-elections from May 2011 to August 2016 ===
The following by-elections were held to fill vacant ward seats in the period between the elections in May 2011 and August 2016.

Date	Ward	Party of the previous councillor	Party of the newly elected councillor
7 August 2013	5	African National Congress	African National Congress
7 August 2013	6	African National Congress	African National Congress
7 August 2013	13	African National Congress	Democratic Alliance
6 May 2015	7	Democratic Alliance	Democratic Alliance
11 November 2015	2	Democratic Alliance	Democratic Alliance
9 December 2015	13	Democratic Alliance	Democratic Alliance

== August 2016 election ==
The following table shows the results of the 2016 election.

Party	Ward			List			Total seats
Party	Votes	%	Seats	Votes	%	Seats	Total seats
Democratic Alliance	15,797	55.27	12	15,783	55.54	2	14
African National Congress	7,770	27.19	1	7,722	27.17	6	7
Independent Civic Organisation of South Africa	1,927	6.74	0	1,750	6.16	2	2
South African Religious Civic Organisation	783	2.74	0	729	2.57	1	1
Economic Freedom Fighters	474	1.66	0	428	1.51	1	1
Advieskantoor	409	1.43	0	431	1.52	0	0
Plaaslike Besorgde Inwoners	414	1.45	0	409	1.44	0	0
Freedom Front Plus	374	1.31	0	407	1.43	0	0
Umemployed Peoples Association	220	0.77	0	245	0.86	0	0
African Christian Democratic Party	177	0.62	0	168	0.59	0	0
Congress of the People	105	0.37	0	196	0.69	0	0
South Africa Civics	82	0.29	0	88	0.31	0	0
Democratic New Civic Association	49	0.17	0	61	0.21	0	0
Total	28,581	100.00	13	28,417	100.00	12	25
Valid votes	28,581	98.89		28,417	98.96		
Invalid/blank votes	322	1.11		299	1.04		
Total votes	28,903	100.00		28,716	100.00		
Registered voters/turnout	52,443	55.11		52,443	54.76		

=== By-elections from August 2016 to November 2021 ===
The following by-elections were held to fill vacant ward seats in the period between the elections in August 2016 and November 2021.

Date	Ward	Party of the previous councillor	Party of the newly elected councillor
30 May 2018	13	Democratic Alliance	Democratic Alliance
9 December 2020	4	Democratic Alliance	Democratic Alliance
9 December 2020	5	Democratic Alliance	African National Congress
9 December 2020	10	Democratic Alliance	African National Congress

== November 2021 election ==
The following table shows the results of the 2021 election.

Party	Ward			List			Total seats
Party	Votes	%	Seats	Votes	%	Seats	Total seats
Democratic Alliance	6,684	29.21	4	7,052	30.90	3	7
African National Congress	6,378	27.88	8	6,292	27.57	0	8
Freedom Front Plus	2,939	12.85	1	2,579	11.30	2	3
Independent Civic Organisation of South Africa	1,504	6.57	0	1,501	6.58	2	2
Oudtshoorn Gemeenskap Inisiatief	1,188	5.19	0	1,248	5.47	1	1
Good	973	4.25	0	956	4.19	1	1
Advieskantoor	857	3.75	0	824	3.61	1	1
Patriotic Alliance	800	3.50	0	795	3.48	1	1
Suid - Kaap Saamstaan	392	1.71	0	349	1.53	1	1
Economic Freedom Fighters	306	1.34	0	305	1.34	0	0
South African Religious Civic Organisation	278	1.22	0	256	1.12	0	0
African Christian Democratic Party	205	0.90	0	230	1.01	0	0
Plaaslike Besorgde Inwoners	137	0.60	0	159	0.70	0	0
Compatriots of South Africa	131	0.57	0	115	0.50	0	0
Cape Independence Party	74	0.32	0	90	0.39	0	0
Africa Restoration Alliance	21	0.09	0	38	0.17	0	0
Dagga Party	1	0.00	0	31	0.14	0	0
Independent candidates	12	0.05	0				0
Total	22,880	100.00	13	22,820	100.00	12	25
Valid votes	22,880	98.98		22,820	98.90		
Invalid/blank votes	236	1.02		253	1.10		
Total votes	23,116	100.00		23,073	100.00		
Registered voters/turnout	52,233	44.26		52,233	44.17		

=== By-elections from November 2021 ===
The following by-elections were held to fill vacant ward seats in the period since November 2021.

Date	Ward	Party of the previous councillor	Party of the newly elected councillor
24 Apr 2024	9	African National Congress	Patriotic Alliance
4 Dec 2024	9	Patriotic Alliance	Patriotic Alliance
25 Mar 2026	5	African National Congress	Patriotic Alliance

== November 2026 election ==
The following table shows the results of the 2026 election.

Party	Ward			List			Total seats
Party	Votes	%	Seats	Votes	%	Seats	Total seats
Democratic Alliance	9,776	37.40	10	10,031	38.17	0	10
African National Congress	5,107	19.54	3	5,131	19.52	2	5
Patriotic Alliance	3,243	12.41	0	3,301	12.56	3	3
Freedom Front Plus	2,700	10.33	0	2,636	10.03	3	3
Advieskantoor	972	3.72	0	894	3.40	1	1
Independent Civic Organisation of South Africa	907	3.47	0	928	3.53	1	1
Restore Azania Movement	701	2.68	0	653	2.48	1	1
Bridgton Civic Association	541	2.07	0	518	1.97	1	1
Good	466	1.78	0	383	1.46	0	0
Build One South Africa	389	1.49	0	364	1.39	0	0
Economic Freedom Fighters	271	1.04	0	362	1.38	0	0
Saamstaan Suid-Afrika	300	1.15	0	289	1.10	0	0
Oudtshoorn United Front	210	0.80	0	286	1.09	0	0
African Christian Democratic Party	142	0.54	0	145	0.55	0	0
People's Movement for Change	95	0.36	0	83	0.32	0	0
National Coloured Congress	69	0.26	0	59	0.22	0	0
South African Communist Party	62	0.24	0	60	0.23	0	0
One Love Alliance	56	0.21	0	37	0.14	0	0
Cape Independence Party	39	0.15	0	29	0.11	0	0
Plaaslike Besorgde Inwoners	28	0.11	0	31	0.12	0	0
Independent candidates	46	0.18	0				0
Ikhwezi Political Movement	13	0.05	0	29	0.11	0	0
Afrika Mayibuye Movement	9	0.03	0	31	0.12	0	0
Total	26,142	100.00	13	26,280	100.00	12	25
Valid votes	26,142	98.61		26,280	98.73		
Invalid/blank votes	369	1.39		339	1.27		
Total votes	26,511	100.00		26,619	100.00		
Registered voters/turnout	56,473	46.94		56,473	47.14		
