= Beaufort West Local Municipality elections =

Local elections in the Western Cape, South Africa

The Beaufort West Local Municipality council consists of thirteen members elected by mixed-member proportional representation. Seven councillors are elected by first-past-the-post voting in seven wards, while the remaining six are chosen from party lists so that the total number of party representatives is proportional to the number of votes received.

In the election of 4 November 2026 no party obtained a majority of seats on the council.

== Results ==
The following table shows the composition of the council after past elections.

Event	ANC	DA	ICOSA	KDF	PA	Other	Total
2000 election	8	5	—	—	—	—	13
2002 floor-crossing	8	3	—	—	—	2	13
2004 floor-crossing	9	3	—	—	—	1	13
2006 election	5	2	5	—	—	1	13
2007 floor-crossing	4	2	5	—	—	2	13
2011 election	7	5	1	—	—	0	13
2016 election	6	6	0	1	—	0	13
2021 election	4	4	—	1	3	1	13
2026 election	3	4	—	1	1	4	13

== December 2000 election ==
The following table shows the results of the 2000 election.

Party	Ward			List			Total seats
Party	Votes	%	Seats	Votes	%	Seats	Total seats
African National Congress	6,124	61.31	5	6,093	61.05	3	8
Democratic Alliance	3,864	38.69	2	3,887	38.95	3	5
Total	9,988	100.00	7	9,980	100.00	6	13
Valid votes	9,988	98.06		9,980	97.98		
Invalid/blank votes	198	1.94		206	2.02		
Total votes	10,186	100.00		10,186	100.00		
Registered voters/turnout	15,732	64.75		15,732	64.75		

=== October 2002 floor crossing ===
In terms of the Eighth Amendment of the Constitution and the judgment of the Constitutional Court in United Democratic Movement v President of the Republic of South Africa and Others, in the period from 8–22 October 2002 councillors had the opportunity to cross the floor to a different political party without losing their seats.

In the Beaufort West council, one councillor crossed from the Democratic Alliance (DA) to the New National Party (NNP), which had formerly been part of the DA, while another DA councillor left the party to sit as an independent.

Party	Seats before	Net change	Seats after
African National Congress	8	0	8
Democratic Alliance	5	▼2	3
New National Party	—	▲1	1
Independent	—	▲1	1

=== September 2004 floor crossing ===
Another floor-crossing period occurred on 1–15 September 2004, in which the NNP councillor crossed to the African National Congress.

Party	Seats before	Net change	Seats after
African National Congress	8	▲1	9
Democratic Alliance	3	0	3
Independent	1	0	1
New National Party	1	▼1	0

=== By-elections from September 2004 to February 2006 ===
The following by-elections were held to fill vacant ward seats in the period between the floor crossing periods in September 2004 and the election in March 2006.

Date	Ward	Party of the previous councillor	Party of the newly elected councillor
2 March 2005	1	Democratic Alliance	Democratic Alliance
2 March 2005	6	African National Congress	African National Congress

== March 2006 election ==
The following table shows the results of the 2006 election.

Party	Ward			List			Total seats
Party	Votes	%	Seats	Votes	%	Seats	Total seats
African National Congress	4,735	41.15	3	4,714	40.56	2	5
Independent Civic Organisation of South Africa	4,096	35.60	3	4,165	35.84	2	5
Democratic Alliance	2,070	17.99	1	2,003	17.24	1	2
Independent Democrats	533	4.63	0	639	5.50	1	1
United Independent Front	72	0.63	0	100	0.86	0	0
Total	11,506	100.00	7	11,621	100.00	6	13
Valid votes	11,506	97.29		11,621	98.18		
Invalid/blank votes	321	2.71		215	1.82		
Total votes	11,827	100.00		11,836	100.00		
Registered voters/turnout	18,906	62.56		18,906	62.60		

=== By-elections from March 2006 to August 2007 ===
The following by-elections were held to fill vacant ward seats in the period between the election in March 2006 and the floor crossing period in September 2007.

Date	Ward	Party of the previous councillor	Party of the newly elected councillor
7 February 2007	1	Democratic Alliance	Democratic Alliance

=== September 2007 floor crossing ===
The final floor-crossing period occurred on 1–15 September 2007; floor-crossing was subsequently abolished in 2008 by the Fifteenth Amendment of the Constitution. In the Beaufort West council one councillor crossed from the ANC to the National People's Party, and the single councillor representing the Independent Democrats crossed to the Social Democratic Party.

Party	Seats before	Net change	Seats after
Independent Civic Organisation of South Africa	5	0	5
African National Congress	5	▼1	4
Democratic Alliance	2	0	2
Independent Democrats	1	▼1	0
National People's Party	—	▲1	1
Social Democratic Party	—	▲1	1

=== By-elections from September 2007 to May 2011 ===
The following by-elections were held to fill vacant ward seats in the period between the floor crossing period in September 2007 and the election in May 2011.

Date	Ward	Party of the previous councillor	Party of the newly elected councillor
19 March 2008	3	Independent Civic Organisation of South Africa	Independent Civic Organisation of South Africa
19 March 2008	5	Independent Civic Organisation of South Africa	Independent Civic Organisation of South Africa
19 March 2008	6	Independent Civic Organisation of South Africa	Independent Civic Organisation of South Africa
21 July 2010	3	Independent Civic Organisation of South Africa	Democratic Alliance
21 July 2010	5	Independent Civic Organisation of South Africa	Democratic Alliance

== May 2011 election ==
The following table shows the results of the 2011 election.

Party	Ward			List			Total seats
Party	Votes	%	Seats	Votes	%	Seats	Total seats
African National Congress	7,805	50.66	6	7,803	49.70	1	7
Democratic Alliance	6,421	41.68	1	6,335	40.35	4	5
Independent Civic Organisation of South Africa	676	4.39	0	655	4.17	1	1
Congress of the People	182	1.18	0	661	4.21	0	0
National People's Party	208	1.35	0	170	1.08	0	0
Independent Congress	84	0.55	0	37	0.24	0	0
South African Progressive Civic Organisation	31	0.20	0	40	0.25	0	0
Total	15,407	100.00	7	15,701	100.00	6	13
Valid votes	15,407	97.09		15,701	99.13		
Invalid/blank votes	462	2.91		138	0.87		
Total votes	15,869	100.00		15,839	100.00		
Registered voters/turnout	23,812	66.64		23,812	66.52		

=== By-elections from May 2011 to August 2016 ===
The following by-elections were held to fill vacant ward seats in the period between the elections in May 2011 and August 2016.

Date	Ward	Party of the previous councillor	Party of the newly elected councillor
7 September 2011	1	African National Congress	African National Congress

== August 2016 election ==
The following table shows the results of the 2016 election.

Party	Ward			List			Total seats
Party	Votes	%	Seats	Votes	%	Seats	Total seats
Democratic Alliance	7,671	48.83	5	7,699	49.14	1	6
African National Congress	6,682	42.54	2	6,561	41.88	4	6
Karoo Democratic Force	825	5.25	0	799	5.10	1	1
Economic Freedom Fighters	203	1.29	0	227	1.45	0	0
Freedom Front Plus	113	0.72	0	114	0.73	0	0
Congress of the People	48	0.31	0	120	0.77	0	0
Pan Africanist Congress of Azania	61	0.39	0	49	0.31	0	0
Independent Civic Organisation of South Africa	50	0.32	0	51	0.33	0	0
South African Religious Civic Organisation	31	0.20	0	47	0.30	0	0
Independent candidates	24	0.15	0				0
Total	15,708	100.00	7	15,667	100.00	6	13
Valid votes	15,708	99.02		15,667	98.79		
Invalid/blank votes	156	0.98		192	1.21		
Total votes	15,864	100.00		15,859	100.00		
Registered voters/turnout	26,027	60.95		26,027	60.93		

=== By-elections from August 2016 to November 2021 ===
The following by-elections were held to fill vacant ward seats in the period between the elections in August 2016 and November 2021.

Date	Ward	Party of the previous councillor	Party of the newly elected councillor
24 May 2017	7	Democratic Alliance	Democratic Alliance
21 February 2018	2	Democratic Alliance	Democratic Alliance
21 April 2021	4	African National Congress	African National Congress

== November 2021 election ==
The following table shows the results of the 2021 election.

Party	Ward			List			Total seats
Party	Votes	%	Seats	Votes	%	Seats	Total seats
African National Congress	4,299	28.46	4	4,237	28.15	0	4
Democratic Alliance	4,212	27.88	1	3,963	26.33	3	4
Patriotic Alliance	3,298	21.83	2	3,314	22.02	1	3
Good	1,596	10.56	0	1,869	12.42	1	1
Karoo Democratic Force	845	5.59	0	825	5.48	1	1
Karoo Gemeenskap Party	325	2.15	0	355	2.36	0	0
Freedom Front Plus	196	1.30	0	222	1.48	0	0
Economic Freedom Fighters	137	0.91	0	128	0.85	0	0
African Christian Democratic Party	98	0.65	0	105	0.70	0	0
Independent candidates	70	0.46	0				0
Africa Restoration Alliance	32	0.21	0	31	0.21	0	0
Total	15,108	100.00	7	15,049	100.00	6	13
Valid votes	15,108	97.96		15,049	98.70		
Invalid/blank votes	315	2.04		198	1.30		
Total votes	15,423	100.00		15,247	100.00		
Registered voters/turnout	26,878	57.38		26,878	56.73		

The African National Congress (ANC) formed a coalition with the Patriotic Alliance (PA) and the Karoo Democratic Force (KDF) to govern the municipality.

=== By-elections from November 2021 ===
The following by-elections were held to fill vacant ward seats in the period since the election in November 2021.

Date	Ward	Party of the previous councillor	Party of the newly elected councillor
19 Jun 2024	1	African National Congress	Democratic Alliance
19 Jun 2024	3	Patriotic Alliance	Democratic Alliance
19 Jun 2024	6	Patriotic Alliance	Democratic Alliance

After the three by-elections on 19 June, the DA holds a majority in the council, and can replace the previous governing coalition of the ANC, PA and KDF.

Party	Ward			List			Total seats
Party	Votes	%	Seats	Votes	%	Seats	Total seats
Democratic Alliance			4			3	7
African National Congress			3			0	3
Patriotic Alliance			0			1	1
Good			0			1	1
Karoo Democratic Force			0			1	1
Total			7			6	13

Following the series of by-elections, the DA held a majority of seats on the municipal council. The composition of the council as of 20 June 2024 was as follows: DA 7, ANC 3, PA 1, KDF 1, Good 1.

== November 2026 election ==
The following table shows the results of the 2026 election.

Party	Ward			List			Total seats
Party	Votes	%	Seats	Votes	%	Seats	Total seats
Democratic Alliance	4,840	29.93	4	4,933	30.47	0	4
African National Congress	4,043	25.00	3	4,038	24.94	0	3
Community First Party	1,386	8.57	0	1,377	8.50	1	1
Patriotic Alliance	1,342	8.30	0	1,375	8.49	1	1
People's Movement for Change	1,174	7.26	0	1,108	6.84	1	1
ActionSA	774	4.79	0	757	4.68	1	1
Activists for the Restoration of the Karoo	681	4.21	0	675	4.17	1	1
Karoo Democratic Force	586	3.62	0	591	3.65	1	1
Mzansi Christian Party	448	2.77	0	423	2.61	0	0
Freedom Front Plus	353	2.18	0	362	2.24	0	0
uMkhonto weSizwe Party	200	1.24	0	207	1.28	0	0
Economic Freedom Fighters	163	1.01	0	170	1.05	0	0
Build One South Africa	83	0.51	0	71	0.44	0	0
Pan Africanist Congress of Azania	39	0.24	0	46	0.28	0	0
South African Communist Party	26	0.16	0	27	0.17	0	0
Afrika Mayibuye Movement	20	0.12	0	24	0.15	0	0
Cape Independence Party	11	0.07	0	8	0.05	0	0
Total	16,169	100.00	7	16,192	100.00	6	13
Valid votes	16,169	98.36		16,192	98.53		
Invalid/blank votes	269	1.64		242	1.47		
Total votes	16,438	100.00		16,434	100.00		
Registered voters/turnout	29,422	55.87		29,422	55.86		

Following the election, a coalition between the Democratic Alliance (DA), Karoo Democratic Force (KDF), the People’s Movement for Change (PMC) and the Community First Party (PIKGRAAF) formed to govern the municipality.
