= Witzenberg Local Municipality elections =

23-member mixed council

The Witzenberg Local Municipality consists of twenty-three members elected by mixed-member proportional representation. Twelve councillors are elected by first-past-the-post voting in twelve wards, while the remaining eleven are chosen from party lists so that the total number of party representatives is proportional to the number of votes received.

No party has ever received a majority at a local government election, with the African National Congress (ANC) receiving a plurality in 2006 and the Democratic Alliance (DA) in 2011, 2016, 2021 and 2026.

== Results ==
The following table shows the composition of the council after past elections.

Event	ANC	COPE	DA	EFF	FF+	ICO	PA	Other	Total
2000 election	9	—	9	—	—	—	—	3	21
2002 floor-crossing	12	—	1	—	—	—	—	8	21
2004 floor-crossing	15	—	2	—	—	—	—	4	21
2006 election	10	—	6	—	—	—	—	5	21
2007 floor-crossing	9	—	7	—	—	—	—	5	21
2011 election	8	1	10	—	—	—	—	4	23
2016 election	8	1	11	1	0	1	—	1	23
2021 election	7	0	8	1	1	1	1	4	23
2021 election (recount)	7	0	9	1	1	1	1	3	23
2026 election	6	—	10	1	1	0	1	4	23

== December 2000 election ==
The following table shows the results of the 2000 election.

Party	Ward			List			Total seats
Party	Votes	%	Seats	Votes	%	Seats	Total seats
African National Congress	7,567	43.48	5	7,508	43.12	4	9
Democratic Alliance	7,106	40.83	6	7,408	42.55	3	9
Witzenberg Onafhanklike Vereniging	1,649	9.48	0	1,552	8.91	2	2
Pan Africanist Congress of Azania	496	2.85	0	664	3.81	1	1
United Democratic Movement	206	1.18	0	279	1.60	0	0
Independent candidates	379	2.18	0				0
Total	17,403	100.00	11	17,411	100.00	10	21
Valid votes	17,403	98.24		17,411	98.33		
Invalid/blank votes	311	1.76		295	1.67		
Total votes	17,714	100.00		17,706	100.00		
Registered voters/turnout	31,190	56.79		31,190	56.77		

=== October 2002 floor crossing ===
In terms of the Eighth Amendment of the Constitution and the judgment of the Constitutional Court in United Democratic Movement v President of the Republic of South Africa and Others, in the period from 8–22 October 2002 councillors had the opportunity to cross the floor to a different political party without losing their seats. In the Witzenberg council the Democratic Alliance (DA) lost seven councillors to the New National Party (NNP), which had formerly been part of the DA, and one councillor to the African National Congress (ANC). One councillor from the "Witzenberg Onafhanklike Vereniging" and one from the Pan Africanist Congress also crossed to the ANC.

Party	Seats before	Net change	Seats after
African National Congress	9	▲3	12
New National Party	–	▲7	7
Democratic Alliance	9	▼8	1
Witzenberg Onafhanklike Vereniging	2	▼1	1
Pan Africanist Congress of Azania	1	▼1	0

=== September 2004 floor crossing ===
Another floor-crossing period occurred on 1–15 September 2004. Two ANC councillors, the remaining DA councillor and the remaining "Witzenberg Onafhanklike Vereniging" councillor all crossed to the Independent Democrats (ID). Five of the NNP councillors crossed to the ANC, and two to the DA.

Party	Seats before	Net change	Seats after
African National Congress	12	▲3	15
Independent Democrats	—	▲4	4
Democratic Alliance	1	▲1	2
New National Party	7	▼7	0
Witzenberg Onafhanklike Vereniging	1	▼1	0

=== By-elections from September 2004 to February 2006 ===
The following by-elections were held to fill vacant ward seats in the period between the floor crossing periods in September 2004 and the election in March 2006.

Date	Ward	Party of the previous councillor	Party of the newly elected councillor
24 October 2004	8	Independent Democrats (Note: The former councillor was elected for the African National Congress but had since crossed the floor to the Independent Democrats.)	African National Congress
7 September 2005	3	Independent Democrats (Note: The former councillor was elected for the Democratic Alliance but had since crossed the floor to the Independent Democrats.)	African National Congress

== March 2006 election ==
The following table shows the results of the 2006 election.

Party	Ward			List			Total seats
Party	Votes	%	Seats	Votes	%	Seats	Total seats
African National Congress	8,297	47.88	8	8,330	48.61	2	10
Democratic Alliance	4,622	26.68	2	4,592	26.79	4	6
Independent Democrats	2,618	15.11	1	2,643	15.42	2	3
United Independent Front	739	4.27	0	757	4.42	1	1
First Community Party of South Africa	648	3.74	0	562	3.28	1	1
Independent candidates	343	1.98	0				0
African Christian Democratic Party	60	0.35	0	254	1.48	0	0
Total	17,327	100.00	11	17,138	100.00	10	21
Valid votes	17,327	98.13		17,138	97.18		
Invalid/blank votes	331	1.87		498	2.82		
Total votes	17,658	100.00		17,636	100.00		
Registered voters/turnout	37,273	47.37		37,273	47.32		

=== September 2007 floor crossing ===
The final floor-crossing period occurred on 1–15 September 2007; floor-crossing was subsequently abolished in 2008 by the Fifteenth Amendment of the Constitution. In the Witzenberg council, one councillor crossed from the Independent Democrats (ID) to the new National People's Party, one crossed from the First Community Party to the ID, and one crossed from the African National Congress to the Democratic Alliance.

Party	Seats before	Net change	Seats after
African National Congress	10	▼1	9
Democratic Alliance	6	▲1	7
Independent Democrats	3	0	3
United Independent Front	1	0	1
National People's Party	—	▲1	1
First Community Party of South Africa	1	▼1	0

=== By-elections from September 2007 to May 2011 ===
The following by-elections were held to fill vacant ward seats in the period between the floor crossing period in September 2007 and the election in May 2011.

Date	Ward	Party of the previous councillor	Party of the newly elected councillor
12 August 2009	3	Democratic Alliance	Democratic Alliance
2 September 2009	5	Democratic Alliance	Democratic Alliance

== May 2011 election ==
The following table shows the results of the 2011 election.

Party	Ward			List			Total seats
Party	Votes	%	Seats	Votes	%	Seats	Total seats
Democratic Alliance	9,634	45.21	7	10,024	47.57	3	10
African National Congress	7,622	35.77	4	7,764	36.84	4	8
National People's Party	722	3.39	0	681	3.23	1	1
Congress of the People	578	2.71	0	612	2.90	1	1
Voice of Independents Party	430	2.02	0	385	1.83	1	1
Democratic Christian Party	403	1.89	0	392	1.86	1	1
United Independent Front	383	1.80	0	386	1.83	0	0
Independent candidates	699	3.28	1				1
African Christian Democratic Party	309	1.45	0	346	1.64	0	0
Democratic Association of Witzenberg Independence	334	1.57	0	282	1.34	0	0
South African Progressive Civic Organisation	194	0.91	0	201	0.95	0	0
Total	21,308	100.00	12	21,073	100.00	11	23
Valid votes	21,308	98.64		21,073	97.61		
Invalid/blank votes	293	1.36		517	2.39		
Total votes	21,601	100.00		21,590	100.00		
Registered voters/turnout	42,208	51.18		42,208	51.15		

=== By-elections from May 2011 to August 2016 ===
The following by-elections were held to fill vacant ward seats in the period between the elections in May 2011 and August 2016.

Date	Ward	Party of the previous councillor	Party of the newly elected councillor
30 January 2013	10	Democratic Alliance	African National Congress (Note: The former councillor was re-elected to the ward on behalf of a different party.)
4 February 2015	10	African National Congress	African National Congress
1 April 2015	7	Democratic Alliance	Democratic Alliance

== August 2016 election ==
The following table shows the results of the 2016 election.

Party	Ward			List			Total seats
Party	Votes	%	Seats	Votes	%	Seats	Total seats
Democratic Alliance	10,886	45.71	7	10,985	46.22	4	11
African National Congress	7,497	31.48	5	7,861	33.08	3	8
Witzenberg Aksie	1,172	4.92	0	1,201	5.05	1	1
Independent Civic Organisation of South Africa	873	3.67	0	944	3.97	1	1
Economic Freedom Fighters	773	3.25	0	783	3.29	1	1
Congress of the People	389	1.63	0	423	1.78	1	1
Land Claims Fighters	424	1.78	0	337	1.42	0	0
African Christian Democratic Party	349	1.47	0	327	1.38	0	0
Freedom Front Plus	324	1.36	0	302	1.27	0	0
Democratic Association of Witzenberg Independence	312	1.31	0	264	1.11	0	0
Patriotic Alliance	221	0.93	0	270	1.14	0	0
Independent candidates	426	1.79	0				0
People's Democratic Movement	170	0.71	0	70	0.29	0	0
Total	23,816	100.00	12	23,767	100.00	11	23
Valid votes	23,816	98.22		23,767	98.04		
Invalid/blank votes	432	1.78		475	1.96		
Total votes	24,248	100.00		24,242	100.00		
Registered voters/turnout	46,980	51.61		46,980	51.60		

The eleven councillors from the Democratic Alliance (DA) formed a coalition with the single councillor from the Congress of the People (COPE) to govern the municipality. The local council sends three representatives to the council of the Cape Winelands District Municipality: two from the Democratic Alliance and one from the African National Congress.

=== By-elections from August 2016 to November 2021 ===
The following by-elections were held to fill vacant ward seats in the period between the elections in August 2016 and November 2021.

Date	Ward	Party of the previous councillor	Party of the newly elected councillor
5 December 2018	9	African National Congress	African National Congress

== November 2021 election ==
The following table shows the results of the 2021 election.

Party	Ward			List			Total seats
Party	Votes	%	Seats	Votes	%	Seats	Total seats
Democratic Alliance	7,388	36.59	8	7,262	36.70	0	8
African National Congress	6,073	30.07	4	6,108	30.86	3	7
Good	1,268	6.28	0	1,232	6.23	2	2
Patriotic Alliance	1,078	5.34	0	1,096	5.54	1	1
Witzenberg Aksie	741	3.67	0	754	3.81	1	1
Independent Civic Organisation of South Africa	616	3.05	0	564	2.85	1	1
Economic Freedom Fighters	575	2.85	0	581	2.94	1	1
Freedom Front Plus	493	2.44	0	479	2.42	1	1
Witzenberg Party	373	1.85	0	404	2.04	1	1
Congress of the People	370	1.83	0	331	1.67	0	0
African Christian Democratic Party	342	1.69	0	315	1.59	0	0
Breedevallei Onafhanklik	239	1.18	0	254	1.28	0	0
Democratic Association of Witzenberg Independence	284	1.41	0	132	0.67	0	0
Witzenberg Onafhanklike Demokratiese Party	183	0.91	0	171	0.86	0	0
Cape Independence Party	75	0.37	0	48	0.24	0	0
Spectrum National Party	56	0.28	0	45	0.23	0	0
Independent candidates	32	0.16	0				0
African Progressive Movement	8	0.04	0	14	0.07	0	0
Total	20,194	100.00	12	19,790	100.00	11	23
Valid votes	20,194	98.75		19,790	98.50		
Invalid/blank votes	255	1.25		301	1.50		
Total votes	20,449	100.00		20,091	100.00		
Registered voters/turnout	47,098	43.42		47,098	42.66		

On 22 November 2021, the DA's Hennie Smit was elected mayor, the ANC's Johnnerey Mouton was elected speaker and Katrina Robyn of the GOOD party was elected deputy mayor.

A successful court application in December 2021 by the Democratic Alliance (DA) to recount the ballets in two wards saw the DA regain a seat from Good and regain control of the council.

Party	Ward			List			Total seats
Party	Votes	%	Seats	Votes	%	Seats	Total seats
Democratic Alliance	7,388	36.82	8	7,361	36.95	1	9
African National Congress	6,073	30.27	4	6,108	30.66	3	7
Good	1,268	6.32	0	1,232	6.18	1	1
Patriotic Alliance	1,082	5.39	0	1,096	5.50	1	1
Witzenberg Aksie	740	3.69	0	754	3.78	1	1
Independent Civic Organisation of South Africa	616	3.07	0	566	2.84	1	1
Economic Freedom Fighters	575	2.87	0	581	2.92	1	1
Freedom Front Plus	492	2.45	0	499	2.50	1	1
Witzenberg Party	373	1.86	0	405	2.03	1	1
Congress of the People	370	1.84	0	334	1.68	0	0
African Christian Democratic Party	339	1.69	0	316	1.59	0	0
Breedevallei Onafhanklik	240	1.20	0	254	1.27	0	0
Witzenberg Onafhanklike Demokratiese Party	183	0.91	0	175	0.88	0	0
Democratic Association of Witzenberg Independence	155	0.77	0	132	0.66	0	0
Cape Independence Party	75	0.37	0	52	0.26	0	0
Spectrum National Party	56	0.28	0	45	0.23	0	0
Independent candidates	32	0.16	0				0
African Progressive Movement	8	0.04	0	14	0.07	0	0
Total	20,065	100.00	12	19,924	100.00	11	23
Valid votes	20,065	98.79		19,924	98.53		
Invalid/blank votes	245	1.21		298	1.47		
Total votes	20,310	100.00		20,222	100.00		
Registered voters/turnout	47,098	43.12		47,098	42.94		

=== By-elections from November 2021 ===
The following by-elections were held to fill vacant ward seats in the period from November 2021.

Date	Ward	Party of the previous councillor	Party of the newly elected councillor
20 April 2022	30904003	Democratic Alliance	Democratic Alliance

== November 2026 election ==
The following table shows the results of the 2026 election.

Party	Ward			List			Total seats
Party	Votes	%	Seats	Votes	%	Seats	Total seats
Democratic Alliance	10,115	40.58	8	10,219	41.00	2	10
African National Congress	5,800	23.27	4	5,896	23.65	2	6
Patriotic Alliance	2,925	11.73	0	2,797	11.22	3	3
Freedom Front Plus	1,277	5.12	0	1,267	5.08	1	1
Economic Freedom Fighters	719	2.88	0	721	2.89	1	1
Democratic Association of Witzenberg Independence	635	2.55	0	686	2.75	1	1
Witzenberg Party	636	2.55	0	603	2.42	1	1
Independent Civic Organisation of South Africa	342	1.37	0	342	1.37	0	0
Good	354	1.42	0	325	1.30	0	0
Witzenberg Aksie	324	1.30	0	345	1.38	0	0
National Coloured Congress	322	1.29	0	283	1.14	0	0
Aboriginal Warriors 4 Economic Hope!	313	1.26	0	275	1.10	0	0
People's Movement for Change	194	0.78	0	216	0.87	0	0
uMkhonto weSizwe Party	167	0.67	0	185	0.74	0	0
Africa Restoration Alliance	166	0.67	0	148	0.59	0	0
African Christian Democratic Party	152	0.61	0	156	0.63	0	0
Witzenberg Onafhanklike Demokratiese Party	96	0.39	0	114	0.46	0	0
South African Communist Party	106	0.43	0	92	0.37	0	0
Pan Africanist Congress of Azania	73	0.29	0	85	0.34	0	0
People's Democratic Movement	61	0.24	0	47	0.19	0	0
Afrika Mayibuye Movement	47	0.19	0	38	0.15	0	0
African Transformation Movement	28	0.11	0	50	0.20	0	0
Cape Independence Party	32	0.13	0	19	0.08	0	0
Organic Humanity Movement	30	0.12	0	18	0.07	0	0
Independent candidates	13	0.05	0				0
Total	24,927	100.00	12	24,927	100.00	11	23
Valid votes	24,927	98.62		24,927	98.65		
Invalid/blank votes	348	1.38		341	1.35		
Total votes	25,275	100.00		25,268	100.00		
Registered voters/turnout	53,234	47.48		53,234	47.47		
