= Breede Valley Local Municipality elections =

The Breede Valley Local Municipality council consists of forty-one members elected by mixed-member proportional representation. Twenty-one councillors are elected by first-past-the-post voting in twenty-one wards, while the remaining twenty are chosen from party lists so that the total number of party representatives is proportional to the number of votes received.

In the election of 1 November 2026 the Democratic Alliance (DA) obtained a plurality of twenty seats on the council.

== Results ==
The following table shows the composition of the council after past elections.

Event	ANC	DA	BO	EFF	FF+	PA	Other	Total
2000 election	17	17	3	—	—	—	0	37
2002 floor-crossing	19	11	2	—	—	—	5	37
2004 floor-crossing	24	12	1	—	—	—	0	37
2006 election	18	13	1	—	—	—	7	39
2007 floor-crossing	17	13	1	—	—	—	8	39
2011 election	14	22	2	—	—	—	3	41
2016 election	12	22	4	1	1	0	1	41
2021 election	10	19	4	2	2	1	3	41
2026 election	7	20	3	1	3	5	2	41

== December 2000 election ==
The following table shows the results of the 2000 election.

Party	Ward			List			Total seats
Party	Votes	%	Seats	Votes	%	Seats	Total seats
African National Congress	15,852	45.95	9	15,711	45.64	8	17
Democratic Alliance	15,388	44.60	10	15,358	44.62	7	17
Breedevallei Onafhanklik	2,537	7.35	0	2,386	6.93	3	3
African Christian Democratic Party	182	0.53	0	724	2.10	0	0
Independent candidates	469	1.36	0				0
The Cape Peoples Congress	73	0.21	0	242	0.70	0	0
Total	34,501	100.00	19	34,421	100.00	18	37
Valid votes	34,501	98.25		34,421	98.03		
Invalid/blank votes	614	1.75		691	1.97		
Total votes	35,115	100.00		35,112	100.00		
Registered voters/turnout	59,277	59.24		59,277	59.23		

=== By-elections from December 2000 to October 2002 ===
The following by-elections were held to fill vacant ward seats in the period between the election in December 2000 and the floor crossing period in October 2002.

Date	Ward	Party of the previous councillor	Party of the newly elected councillor
15 September 2001	1	Democratic Alliance	African National Congress
28 November 2001	2	African National Congress	African National Congress

=== October 2002 floor crossing ===
In terms of the Eighth Amendment of the Constitution and the judgment of the Constitutional Court in United Democratic Movement v President of the Republic of South Africa and Others, in the period from 8–22 October 2002 councillors had the opportunity to cross the floor to a different political party without losing their seats. In the Breede Valley council, four councillors from the Democratic Alliance (DA) crossed to the New National Party (NNP), which had formerly been part of the DA, and one councillor crossed from the DA to "Breedevallei Onafhanklik" (BO). One councillor crossed from BO to the African National Congress (ANC) and one crossed from BO to the NNP.

Party	Seats before	Net change	Seats after
African National Congress	18	▲1	19
Democratic Alliance	16	▼5	11
New National Party	—	▲5	5
Breedevallei Onafhanklik	3	▼1	2

=== By-elections from October 2002 to August 2004 ===
The following by-elections were held to fill vacant ward seats in the period between the floor crossing periods in October 2002 and September 2004.

Date	Ward	Party of the previous councillor	Party of the newly elected councillor
7 May 2003	18	African National Congress	African National Congress (Note: Elected uncontested as no other candidates were nominated.)
27 July 2004	10	Breedevallei Onafhanklik (Note: The former councillor was elected for the Democratic Alliance but had since crossed the floor to Breedevallei Onafhanklik.)	African National Congress

=== September 2004 floor crossing ===
Another floor-crossing period occurred on 1–15 September 2004, in which four of the NNP councillors crossed to the ANC and one NNP councillor crossed to the DA.

Party	Seats before	Net change	Seats after
African National Congress	20	▲4	24
Democratic Alliance	11	▲1	12
New National Party	5	▼5	0
Breedevallei Onafhanklik	1	0	1

== March 2006 election ==
The following table shows the results of the 2006 election.

Party	Ward			List			Total seats
Party	Votes	%	Seats	Votes	%	Seats	Total seats
African National Congress	15,001	46.78	12	14,902	47.35	6	18
Democratic Alliance	10,611	33.09	6	10,808	34.34	7	13
Independent Democrats	3,543	11.05	1	3,701	11.76	4	5
Breedevallei Onafhanklik	862	2.69	0	1,256	3.99	1	1
Independent candidates	1,418	4.42	1				1
Freedom Front Plus	447	1.39	0	404	1.28	1	1
United Independent Front	104	0.32	0	226	0.72	0	0
Pan Africanist Congress of Azania	82	0.26	0	177	0.56	0	0
Total	32,068	100.00	20	31,474	100.00	19	39
Valid votes	32,068	98.18		31,474	96.54		
Invalid/blank votes	595	1.82		1,128	3.46		
Total votes	32,663	100.00		32,602	100.00		
Registered voters/turnout	65,423	49.93		65,423	49.83		

=== September 2007 floor crossing ===
The final floor-crossing period occurred on 1–15 September 2007; floor-crossing was subsequently abolished in 2008 by the Fifteenth Amendment of the Constitution. In the Breede Valley council, four councillors crossed from the Independent Democrats (ID) to the new National People's Party, two councillors left the African National Congress (ANC) to sit as independents, and the existing independent councillor joined the ANC.

Party	Seats before	Net change	Seats after
African National Congress	18	▼1	17
Democratic Alliance	13	0	13
National People's Party	—	▲4	4
Independent	1	▲1	2
Independent Democrats	5	▼4	1
Breedevallei Onafhanklik	1	0	1
Freedom Front Plus	1	0	1

=== By-elections from September 2007 to May 2011 ===
The following by-elections were held to fill vacant ward seats in the period between the floor crossing period in September 2007 and the election in May 2011.

Date	Ward	Party of the previous councillor	Party of the newly elected councillor
10 December 2008	3	African National Congress	Independent (Note: The former councillor was re-elected to the ward as an independent.)
10 December 2008	5	African National Congress	African National Congress
10 December 2008	16	African National Congress	Independent
10 December 2008	17	African National Congress	African National Congress
24 June 2009	15	Democratic Alliance	Democratic Alliance
14 October 2009	11	Independent (Note: The former councillor was elected for the African National Congress but had since crossed the floor to sit as an independent.)	Democratic Alliance
24 March 2010	10	African National Congress	Democratic Alliance

== May 2011 election ==
The following table shows the results of the 2011 election.

Party	Ward			List			Total seats
Party	Votes	%	Seats	Votes	%	Seats	Total seats
Democratic Alliance	22,074	50.40	13	23,306	55.10	9	22
African National Congress	13,408	30.61	6	14,707	34.77	8	14
Breedevallei Onafhanklik	1,554	3.55	0	1,715	4.05	2	2
Independent candidates	2,295	5.24	1				1
Congress of the People	2,177	4.97	1				1
Civic Independent	487	1.11	0	738	1.74	1	1
South African Progressive Civic Organisation	446	1.02	0	426	1.01	0	0
African Christian Democratic Party	381	0.87	0	393	0.93	0	0
National People's Party	302	0.69	0	280	0.66	0	0
Democratic Christian Party	259	0.59	0	277	0.65	0	0
Freedom Front Plus	268	0.61	0	219	0.52	0	0
Western Cape Community	121	0.28	0	154	0.36	0	0
United Democratic Movement	25	0.06	0	83	0.20	0	0
Total	43,797	100.00	21	42,298	100.00	20	41
Valid votes	43,797	98.59		42,298	95.32		
Invalid/blank votes	626	1.41		2,079	4.68		
Total votes	44,423	100.00		44,377	100.00		
Registered voters/turnout	71,849	61.83		71,849	61.76		

== August 2016 election ==
The following table shows the results of the 2016 election.

Party	Ward			List			Total seats
Party	Votes	%	Seats	Votes	%	Seats	Total seats
Democratic Alliance	24,696	53.83	15	24,917	54.41	7	22
African National Congress	13,691	29.84	6	13,719	29.96	6	12
Breedevallei Onafhanklik	3,941	8.59	0	3,872	8.46	4	4
Economic Freedom Fighters	1,278	2.79	0	1,280	2.80	1	1
Freedom Front Plus	528	1.15	0	472	1.03	1	1
People's Democratic Movement	464	1.01	0	389	0.85	1	1
African Christian Democratic Party	382	0.83	0	390	0.85	0	0
Civic Independent	295	0.64	0	231	0.50	0	0
Congress of the People	206	0.45	0	278	0.61	0	0
Independent candidates	251	0.55	0				0
United Democratic Movement	90	0.20	0	113	0.25	0	0
Patriotic Alliance	23	0.05	0	87	0.19	0	0
Independent Civic Organisation of South Africa	35	0.08	0	46	0.10	0	0
Total	45,880	100.00	21	45,794	100.00	20	41
Valid votes	45,880	98.90		45,794	98.85		
Invalid/blank votes	512	1.10		535	1.15		
Total votes	46,392	100.00		46,329	100.00		
Registered voters/turnout	77,483	59.87		77,483	59.79		

The local council sends five representatives to the council of the Cape Winelands District Municipality: three from the Democratic Alliance and one each from the African National Congress and Breedevallei Onafhanklik.

=== By-elections from August 2016 to November 2021 ===
The following by-elections were held to fill vacant ward seats in the period between the elections in August 2016 and November 2021.

Date	Ward	Party of the previous councillor	Party of the newly elected councillor
24 April 2018	10	Democratic Alliance	Democratic Alliance
24 October 2018	3	Democratic Alliance	Democratic Alliance

== November 2021 election ==
The following table shows the results of the 2021 election.

Party	Ward			List			Total seats
Party	Votes	%	Seats	Votes	%	Seats	Total seats
Democratic Alliance	16,480	44.99	12	16,501	44.66	7	19
African National Congress	8,644	23.60	8	8,772	23.74	2	10
Breedevallei Onafhanklik	3,553	9.70	1	3,649	9.87	3	4
Freedom Front Plus	2,140	5.84	0	2,062	5.58	2	2
Economic Freedom Fighters	1,220	3.33	0	1,439	3.89	2	2
Good	1,243	3.39	0	1,347	3.65	2	2
Patriotic Alliance	1,055	2.88	0	1,072	2.90	1	1
African Christian Democratic Party	491	1.34	0	475	1.29	1	1
People's Democratic Movement	282	0.77	0	316	0.86	0	0
Economic Liberation Congress	368	1.00	0	225	0.61	0	0
Cape Coloured Congress	235	0.64	0	235	0.64	0	0
Congress of the People	47	0.13	0	283	0.77	0	0
Karoo Democratic Force	128	0.35	0	137	0.37	0	0
Independent Civic Organisation of South Africa	146	0.40	0	96	0.26	0	0
Independent candidates	224	0.61	0				0
Cape Independence Party	115	0.31	0	72	0.19	0	0
Khoisan United Movement	70	0.19	0	79	0.21	0	0
Al Jama-ah	59	0.16	0	51	0.14	0	0
United Democratic Movement	38	0.10	0	66	0.18	0	0
National Freedom Party	53	0.14	0	38	0.10	0	0
Spectrum National Party	40	0.11	0	31	0.08	0	0
African Progressive Movement	2	0.01	0	6	0.02	0	0
Total	36,633	100.00	21	36,952	100.00	20	41
Valid votes	36,633	98.78		36,952	98.80		
Invalid/blank votes	454	1.22		447	1.20		
Total votes	37,087	100.00		37,399	100.00		
Registered voters/turnout	77,739	47.71		77,739	48.11		

== November 2026 election ==
The following table shows the results of the 2026 election.

Party	Ward			List			Total seats
Party	Votes	%	Seats	Votes	%	Seats	Total seats
Democratic Alliance	20,255	47.71	15	20,109	47.42	5	20
African National Congress	7,532	17.74	5	7,611	17.95	2	7
Patriotic Alliance	4,660	10.98	0	4,802	11.32	5	5
Freedom Front Plus	3,043	7.17	0	3,262	7.69	3	3
Breedevallei Onafhanklik	2,969	6.99	1	3,138	7.40	2	3
Economic Freedom Fighters	868	2.04	0	932	2.20	1	1
Good	684	1.61	0	665	1.57	1	1
African Christian Democratic Party	499	1.18	0	494	1.17	1	1
4th Generation Movement	312	0.73	0	344	0.81	0	0
People's Movement for Change	332	0.78	0	273	0.64	0	0
Independent candidates	571	1.34	0				0
South African Communist Party	152	0.36	0	170	0.40	0	0
Alliance of Citizens for Change	101	0.24	0	82	0.19	0	0
uMkhonto weSizwe Party	64	0.15	0	105	0.25	0	0
Pan Africanist Congress of Azania	85	0.20	0	83	0.20	0	0
Aboriginal Warriors 4 Economic Hope!	78	0.18	0	80	0.19	0	0
African Transformation Movement	37	0.09	0	99	0.23	0	0
Cape Independence Party	38	0.09	0	74	0.17	0	0
United Democratic Movement	86	0.20	0				0
Karoo Democratic Force	41	0.10	0	33	0.08	0	0
People's Democratic Movement	30	0.07	0	24	0.06	0	0
Afrika Mayibuye Movement	19	0.04	0	22	0.05	0	0
Total	42,456	100.00	21	42,402	100.00	20	41
Valid votes	42,456	98.53		42,402	98.39		
Invalid/blank votes	633	1.47		693	1.61		
Total votes	43,089	100.00		43,095	100.00		
Registered voters/turnout	84,867	50.77		84,867	50.78		
