= Mossel Bay Local Municipality elections =

Local elections in the Western Cape, South Africa

The Mossel Bay Local Municipality council (within the South African Garden Route District Municipality) consists of thirty-three members elected by mixed-member proportional representation. Seventeen councillors are elected by first-past-the-post voting in seventeen wards, while the remaining sixteen are chosen from party lists so that the total number of party representatives is proportional to the number of votes received.

Marie Ferreira of the Democratic Alliance (DA) became executive mayor after the March 2006 local government elections when the DA formed a coalition with Independent Civic Organisation of South Africa (ICOSA) since no single party had obtained an outright majority. The DA held 10 seats in the (then) 23-seat council followed by 8 for the African National Congress (ANC) and 3 for ICOSA.

Following the September 2007, floor-crossing window the DA gained an outright majority when 3 councillors defected to the DA resulting in the DA holding 13 seats out of 23 while the ANC lost a seat to the DA and currently has 7. ICOSA lost its representation in the council when 2 councillors defected to the DA and its one ward councillor became an independent.

In the election of 18 May 2011 the DA won a majority of sixteen seats on the council. In the election of 3 August 2016 the DA increased its majority to seventeen seats. The DA further expanded that majority to nineteen seats in the election of 1 November 2021.

In the election of 4 November 2026 the DA won a majority of twenty-one seats.

== Results ==
The following table shows the composition of the council after past elections.

Event	ACDP	ANC	DA	ICOSA	FF+	PA	Other	Total
2000 election	—	8	12	—	—	—	1	21
2002 floor-crossing	—	9	11	—	—	—	1	21
2004 floor-crossing	—	10	11	—	—	—	0	21
2006 election	1	8	10	3	0	—	1	23
2007 floor-crossing	1	7	13	0	0	—	2	23
2011 election	1	10	16	0	—	—	0	27
2016 election	1	7	17	1	1	—	0	27
2021 election	1	5	19	1	2	1	0	29
2026 election	0	4	21	0	3	3	2	33

== December 2000 election ==
The following table shows the results of the 2000 election.

Party	Ward			List			Total seats
Party	Votes	%	Seats	Votes	%	Seats	Total seats
Democratic Alliance	11,168	57.54	6	11,321	58.57	6	12
African National Congress	6,645	34.24	5	6,952	35.96	3	8
Mosselbaai Gemeenskapsforum	875	4.51	0	806	4.17	1	1
Independent candidates	539	2.78	0				0
United Democratic Movement	182	0.94	0	251	1.30	0	0
Total	19,409	100.00	11	19,330	100.00	10	21
Valid votes	19,409	98.48		19,330	98.28		
Invalid/blank votes	299	1.52		338	1.72		
Total votes	19,708	100.00		19,668	100.00		
Registered voters/turnout	31,037	63.50		31,037	63.37		

=== October 2002 floor crossing ===
In terms of the Eighth Amendment of the Constitution and the judgment of the Constitutional Court in United Democratic Movement v President of the Republic of South Africa and Others, in the period from 8–22 October 2002 councillors had the opportunity to cross the floor to a different political party without losing their seats.

In the Mossel Bay council, one councillor from the Democratic Alliance (DA) crossed the floor to the New National Party (NNP), which had formerly been part of the DA. The single councillor from the "Mosselbaai Gemeenskapsforum" crossed to the African National Congress.

Party	Seats before	Net change	Seats after
Democratic Alliance	12	▼1	11
African National Congress	8	▲1	9
New National Party	—	▲1	1
Mosselbaai Gemeenskapsforum	1	▼1	0

=== September 2004 floor crossing ===
Another floor-crossing period occurred on 1–15 September 2004, in which the single NNP councillor crossed to the ANC.

Party	Seats before	Net change	Seats after
Democratic Alliance	11	1	11
African National Congress	9	▲1	10
New National Party	1	▼1	0

=== By-elections from September 2004 to February 2006 ===
The following by-elections were held to fill vacant ward seats in the period between the floor crossing periods in September 2004 and the election in March 2006.

Date	Ward	Party of the previous councillor	Party of the newly elected councillor
27 October 2004	9	Democratic Alliance	African National Congress (Note: The former councillor was re-elected to the ward on behalf of a different party.)

== March 2006 election ==
The following table shows the results of the 2006 election.

Party	Ward			List			Total seats
Party	Votes	%	Seats	Votes	%	Seats	Total seats
Democratic Alliance	10,111	43.92	6	10,173	44.19	4	10
African National Congress	8,171	35.50	5	8,116	35.26	3	8
Independent Civic Organisation of South Africa	2,826	12.28	1	2,778	12.07	2	3
Independent Democrats	717	3.11	0	753	3.27	1	1
African Christian Democratic Party	663	2.88	0	655	2.85	1	1
Freedom Front Plus	400	1.74	0	544	2.36	0	0
Independent candidates	131	0.57	0				0
Total	23,019	100.00	12	23,019	100.00	11	23
Valid votes	23,019	98.87		23,019	98.76		
Invalid/blank votes	262	1.13		290	1.24		
Total votes	23,281	100.00		23,309	100.00		
Registered voters/turnout	40,604	57.34		40,604	57.41		

=== By-elections from March 2006 to August 2007 ===
The following by-elections were held to fill vacant ward seats in the period between the election in March 2006 and the floor crossing period in September 2007.

Date	Ward	Party of the previous councillor	Party of the newly elected councillor
25 July 2007	2	African National Congress	African National Congress

=== September 2007 floor crossing ===
The final floor-crossing period occurred on 1–15 September 2007; floor-crossing was subsequently abolished in 2008 by the Fifteenth Amendment of the Constitution. In the Mossel Bay council two councillors from the Independent Civic Organisation (ICOSA) crossed to the Democratic Alliance (DA), while the third ICOSA councillor left the party to sit as an independent. One councillor crossed from the African National Congress to the DA.

Party	Seats before	Net change	Seats after
Democratic Alliance	10	▲3	13
African National Congress	8	▼1	7
Independent Democrats	1	0	1
African Christian Democratic Party	1	0	1
Independent	—	▲1	1
Independent Civic Organisation of South Africa	3	▼3	0

=== By-elections from September 2007 to May 2011 ===
The following by-elections were held to fill vacant ward seats in the period between the floor crossing period in September 2007 and the election in May 2011.

Date	Ward	Party of the previous councillor	Party of the newly elected councillor
24 February 2010	9	Independent (Note: The former councillor was elected for the Independent Civic Organisation but had since crossed the floor to sit as an independent.)	Democratic Alliance

== May 2011 election ==
The following table shows the results of the 2011 election.

Party	Ward			List			Total seats
Party	Votes	%	Seats	Votes	%	Seats	Total seats
Democratic Alliance	19,551	58.19	10	19,908	59.03	6	16
African National Congress	12,190	36.28	4	12,337	36.58	6	10
African Christian Democratic Party	825	2.46	0	719	2.13	1	1
Independent Civic Organisation of South Africa	343	1.02	0	351	1.04	0	0
Congress of the People	293	0.87	0	321	0.95	0	0
Independent candidates	327	0.97	0				0
United Democratic Movement	70	0.21	0	89	0.26	0	0
Total	33,599	100.00	14	33,725	100.00	13	27
Valid votes	33,599	99.09		33,725	99.41		
Invalid/blank votes	309	0.91		201	0.59		
Total votes	33,908	100.00		33,926	100.00		
Registered voters/turnout	52,146	65.03		52,146	65.06		

=== By-elections from May 2011 to August 2016 ===
The following by-elections were held to fill vacant ward seats in the period between the elections in May 2011 and August 2016.

Date	Ward	Party of the previous councillor	Party of the newly elected councillor
18 September 2013	8	Democratic Alliance	Democratic Alliance
13 August 2014	10	Democratic Alliance	Democratic Alliance

== August 2016 election ==
The following table shows the results of the 2016 election.

Party	Ward			List			Total seats
Party	Votes	%	Seats	Votes	%	Seats	Total seats
Democratic Alliance	22,808	60.90	10	22,702	60.83	7	17
African National Congress	9,893	26.41	4	9,872	26.45	3	7
Independent Civic Organisation of South Africa	1,908	5.09	0	1,764	4.73	1	1
Freedom Front Plus	1,265	3.38	0	1,335	3.58	1	1
African Christian Democratic Party	855	2.28	0	799	2.14	1	1
Economic Freedom Fighters	460	1.23	0	456	1.22	0	0
D'Almedia Civic Association	135	0.36	0	177	0.47	0	0
Gourikwa Khoisan	98	0.26	0	122	0.33	0	0
Plaaslike Besorgde Inwoners	27	0.07	0	65	0.17	0	0
South Africa Civics	5	0.01	0	26	0.07	0	0
Total	37,454	100.00	14	37,318	100.00	13	27
Valid votes	37,454	99.11		37,318	98.77		
Invalid/blank votes	335	0.89		463	1.23		
Total votes	37,789	100.00		37,781	100.00		
Registered voters/turnout	59,270	63.76		59,270	63.74		

== November 2021 election ==
The following table shows the results of the 2021 election.

Party	Ward			List			Total seats
Party	Votes	%	Seats	Votes	%	Seats	Total seats
Democratic Alliance	23,372	66.32	10	23,340	66.15	9	19
African National Congress	5,333	15.13	5	5,431	15.39	0	5
Freedom Front Plus	1,889	5.36	0	1,936	5.49	2	2
Independent Civic Organisation of South Africa	1,791	5.08	0	1,774	5.03	1	1
African Christian Democratic Party	915	2.60	0	907	2.57	1	1
Patriotic Alliance	702	1.99	0	718	2.04	1	1
Economic Freedom Fighters	544	1.54	0	577	1.64	0	0
Good	207	0.59	0	234	0.66	0	0
Cape Independence Party	169	0.48	0	180	0.51	0	0
United Independent Movement	125	0.35	0	117	0.33	0	0
Independent candidates	141	0.40	0				0
Eden United People's Party	32	0.09	0	27	0.08	0	0
African Transformation Movement	2	0.01	0	25	0.07	0	0
Spectrum National Party	9	0.03	0	9	0.03	0	0
Africa Restoration Alliance	9	0.03	0	7	0.02	0	0
Total	35,240	100.00	15	35,282	100.00	14	29
Valid votes	35,240	99.26		35,282	99.07		
Invalid/blank votes	263	0.74		333	0.93		
Total votes	35,503	100.00		35,615	100.00		
Registered voters/turnout	64,310	55.21		64,310	55.38		

=== By-elections from November 2021 ===
The following by-elections were held to fill vacant ward seats in the period since the election in November 2021.

Date	Ward	Party of the previous councillor	Party of the newly elected councillor
25 Jun 2025	9	Democratic Alliance	Patriotic Alliance

== November 2026 election ==
The following table shows the results of the 2026 election.

Party	Ward			List			Total seats
Party	Votes	%	Seats	Votes	%	Seats	Total seats
Democratic Alliance	31,765	66.24	13	31,680	66.06	8	21
African National Congress	4,888	10.19	4	4,852	10.12	0	4
Freedom Front Plus	4,688	9.78	0	4,693	9.79	3	3
Patriotic Alliance	4,250	8.86	0	4,344	9.06	3	3
South African Communist Party	690	1.44	0	698	1.46	1	1
Economic Freedom Fighters	617	1.29	0	599	1.25	1	1
African Christian Democratic Party	517	1.08	0	549	1.14	0	0
People's Movement for Change	158	0.33	0	143	0.30	0	0
Independent Civic Organisation of South Africa	80	0.17	0	73	0.15	0	0
Cape Independence Party	71	0.15	0	62	0.13	0	0
Independent Ratepayers Association of SA	65	0.14	0	59	0.12	0	0
Ikhwezi Political Movement	57	0.12	0	63	0.13	0	0
uMkhonto weSizwe Party	26	0.05	0	75	0.16	0	0
Afrika Mayibuye Movement	35	0.07	0	24	0.05	0	0
One Love Alliance	21	0.04	0	28	0.06	0	0
National Coloured Congress	30	0.06	0	15	0.03	0	0
Total	47,958	100.00	17	47,957	100.00	16	33
Valid votes	47,958	99.37		47,957	99.34		
Invalid/blank votes	303	0.63		318	0.66		
Total votes	48,261	100.00		48,275	100.00		
Registered voters/turnout	79,938	60.37		79,938	60.39		
