= Overstrand Local Municipality elections =

Local elections in South Africa

The council of the Overstrand Local Municipality in the Western Cape, South Africa is elected every five years by a system of mixed-member proportional representation. Half of the councillors are elected by first-past-the-post voting from individual wards, while the other half are appointed from party lists so that the total number of party representatives is proportional to the number of votes received. By-elections are held to replace the councillors elected by wards if a vacancy occurs.

== Results ==
The following table shows the composition of the council after past elections and floor-crossing periods.

Event	ACDP	ANC	DA	EFF	FF+	LP	NNP	Other	Total
2000 election	1	5	12	—	—	—	—	0	18
2002 floor-crossing	1	5	5	—	—	—	7	0	18
2004 floor-crossing	1	10	5	—	—	—	2	0	18
2006 election	1	7	10	—	—	—	—	1	19
2007 floor-crossing	0	6	11	—	—	—	—	2	19
2011 election	0	9	15	—	—	—	—	1	25
2016 election	—	8	16	1	—	—	—	0	25
2021 election	1	4	17	1	2	2	—	0	27
2026 election	1	4	18	0	3	1	—	2	29

== December 2000 election ==
The Overstrand municipality was created in 2000 by merging the Hangklip-Kleinmond, Hermanus, Stanford and Gansbaai municipalities. The council consisted of 18 members, 9 elected to represent wards and 9 from party lists. The election was held on 5 December 2000; the Democratic Alliance won a majority of 12 seats.

Party	Ward			List			Total seats
Party	Votes	%	Seats	Votes	%	Seats	Total seats
Democratic Alliance	11,060	66.60	7	11,168	67.19	5	12
African National Congress	4,521	27.22	2	4,604	27.70	3	5
African Christian Democratic Party	843	5.08	0	850	5.11	1	1
Independent candidates	149	0.90	0				0
United Democratic Movement	34	0.20	0				0
Total	16,607	100.00	9	16,622	100.00	9	18
Valid votes	16,607	98.72		16,622	98.73		
Invalid/blank votes	216	1.28		214	1.27		
Total votes	16,823	100.00		16,836	100.00		
Registered voters/turnout	26,754	62.88		26,754	62.93		
Source: Electoral Commission

=== By-elections from December 2000 to October 2002 ===
The following by-elections were held to fill vacant ward seats in the period between the election in December 2000 and the floor crossing period in October 2002.

Date	Ward	Party of the previous councillor	Party of the newly elected councillor
15 May 2002	2	Democratic Alliance	Democratic Alliance
15 May 2002	4	Democratic Alliance	Democratic Alliance

=== October 2002 floor crossing ===
In terms of the Eighth Amendment of the Constitution and the judgment of the Constitutional Court in United Democratic Movement v President of the Republic of South Africa and Others, in the period from 8–22 October 2002 councillors had the opportunity to cross the floor to a different political party without losing their seats.

In the Overstrand council, seven councillors departed the Democratic Alliance (DA) to become representatives of the New National Party (NNP). The NNP, which had formerly been part of the DA, then formed a coalition with the African National Congress (ANC); this coalition had a majority of 12 seats.

Party	Seats		
Party	Seats before	Net change	Seats after
New National Party	—	▲7	7
Democratic Alliance	12	▼7	5
African National Congress	5	0	5
African Christian Democratic Party	1	0	1
Total	18	0	18

=== September 2004 floor crossing ===
Another floor-crossing period occurred on 1–15 September 2004. In the Overstrand council, 5 councillors crossed from the New National Party (NNP) to the African National Congress (ANC), giving the ANC a majority of 10 seats.

Party	Seats		
Party	Seats before	Net change	Seats after
African National Congress	5	▲5	10
Democratic Alliance	5	0	5
New National Party	7	▼5	2
African Christian Democratic Party	1	0	1
Total	18	0	18

== March 2006 election ==
At the elections of 1 March 2006, the council was expanded to 19 members with the addition of a new ward. The Democratic Alliance won a majority with 10 seats.

Party	Ward			List			Total seats
Party	Votes	%	Seats	Votes	%	Seats	Total seats
Democratic Alliance	10,866	54.77	6	10,801	54.53	4	10
African National Congress	7,625	38.44	4	7,534	38.03	3	7
African Christian Democratic Party	973	4.90	0	907	4.58	1	1
Independent Democrats	374	1.89	0	441	2.23	1	1
Pan Africanist Congress of Azania				126	0.64	0	0
Total	19,838	100.00	10	19,809	100.00	9	19
Valid votes	19,838	98.83		19,809	98.78		
Invalid/blank votes	234	1.17		244	1.22		
Total votes	20,072	100.00		20,053	100.00		
Registered voters/turnout	35,584	56.41		35,584	56.35		
Source: Electoral Commission

=== September 2007 floor crossing ===
The final floor-crossing period occurred on 1–15 September 2007; floor-crossing was subsequently abolished in 2008 by the Fifteenth Amendment of the Constitution. In the Overstrand council, the only representative of the African Christian Democratic Party crossed to the Democratic Alliance (DA), giving the DA an increased majority with 11 seats. The only representative of the Independent Democrats, as well as one representative of the African National Congress, crossed to the newly formed National People's Party.

Party	Seats		
Party	Seats before	Net change	Seats after
Democratic Alliance	10	▲1	11
African National Congress	7	▼1	6
National People's Party	—	▲2	2
African Christian Democratic Party	1	▼1	0
Independent Democrats	1	▼1	0
Total	19	0	19

=== By-elections from September 2007 to May 2011 ===
The following by-elections were held to fill vacant ward seats in the period between the floor crossing period in September 2007 and the election in May 2011.

Date	Ward	Party of the previous councillor	Party of the newly elected councillor
24 June 2009	3	Democratic Alliance	Democratic Alliance
24 February 2010	1	African National Congress	Democratic Alliance

== May 2011 election ==
At the election of 18 May 2011, the council was expanded to 25 members with the addition of 3 new wards and 3 new PR list seats. The Democratic Alliance won a majority with 15 seats.

Party	Ward			List			Total seats
Party	Votes	%	Seats	Votes	%	Seats	Total seats
Democratic Alliance	17,766	56.99	9	18,028	57.52	6	15
African National Congress	10,808	34.67	4	11,336	36.17	5	9
National Independent Civic Organisation	986	3.16	0	991	3.16	1	1
Congress of the People	465	1.49	0	420	1.34	0	0
Independent candidates	503	1.61	0				0
United Democratic Movement	256	0.82	0	231	0.74	0	0
African Christian Democratic Party	228	0.73	0	180	0.57	0	0
National People's Party	100	0.32	0	89	0.28	0	0
African Bond of Unity	61	0.20	0	68	0.22	0	0
Total	31,173	100.00	13	31,343	100.00	12	25
Valid votes	31,173	99.14		31,343	99.39		
Invalid/blank votes	270	0.86		191	0.61		
Total votes	31,443	100.00		31,534	100.00		
Registered voters/turnout	45,298	69.41		45,298	69.61		
Source: Electoral Commission

=== By-elections from May 2011 to August 2016 ===
The following by-elections were held to fill vacant ward seats in the period between the elections in May 2011 and August 2016.

Date	Ward	Party of the previous councillor	Party of the newly elected councillor
7 August 2013	3	Democratic Alliance	Democratic Alliance
26 November 2014	2	Democratic Alliance	Democratic Alliance
26 November 2014	5	African National Congress	African National Congress
26 November 2014	7	Democratic Alliance	Democratic Alliance (Note: Elected uncontested as no other candidates were nominated.)
30 September 2015	2	Democratic Alliance	Democratic Alliance

== August 2016 election ==
At the election of 3 August 2016, the Democratic Alliance won a majority with 16 seats.

Party	Ward			List			Total seats
Party	Votes	%	Seats	Votes	%	Seats	Total seats
Democratic Alliance	22,917	64.33	9	23,047	64.65	7	16
African National Congress	11,116	31.20	4	11,154	31.29	4	8
Economic Freedom Fighters	697	1.96	0	665	1.87	1	1
Freedom Front Plus	625	1.75	0	510	1.43	0	0
United Democratic Movement	140	0.39	0	206	0.58	0	0
People's Democratic Movement	35	0.10	0	65	0.18	0	0
Ubuntu Party	48	0.13	0				0
Independent candidates	46	0.13	0				0
Total	35,624	100.00	13	35,647	100.00	12	25
Valid votes	35,624	99.41		35,647	99.33		
Invalid/blank votes	211	0.59		242	0.67		
Total votes	35,835	100.00		35,889	100.00		
Registered voters/turnout	53,384	67.13		53,384	67.23		
Source: Electoral Commission

=== By-elections from August 2016 to 2021 ===
The following by-elections were held to fill vacant ward seats in the period between the elections since August 2016.

Date	Ward	Party of the previous councillor	Party of the newly elected councillor
21 February 2018	13	Democratic Alliance	Democratic Alliance
9 December 2020	12	African National Congress	Land Party

== November 2021 election ==
At the election of 1 November 2021, the Democratic Alliance won a majority with 17 seats.

Party	Ward			List			Total seats
Party	Votes	%	Seats	Votes	%	Seats	Total seats
Democratic Alliance	22,111	63.71	10	21,887	63.66	7	17
African National Congress	5,405	15.58	3	5,452	15.86	1	4
Land Party	2,592	7.47	1	2,660	7.74	1	2
Freedom Front Plus	1,893	5.45	0	1,860	5.41	2	2
Economic Freedom Fighters	906	2.61	0	923	2.68	1	1
African Christian Democratic Party	799	2.30	0	771	2.24	1	1
Cape Independence Party	202	0.58	0	226	0.66	0	0
Good	164	0.47	0	225	0.65	0	0
Western Province Party	233	0.67	0	134	0.39	0	0
Independent candidates	235	0.68	0				0
Patriotic Alliance	50	0.14	0	109	0.32	0	0
The Organic Humanity Movement	60	0.17	0	60	0.17	0	0
Spectrum National Party	32	0.09	0	17	0.05	0	0
Congress of the People	18	0.05	0	30	0.09	0	0
Independent Civic Organisation of South Africa	3	0.01	0	25	0.07	0	0
Total	34,703	100.00	14	34,379	100.00	13	27
Valid votes	34,703	99.21		34,379	99.23		
Invalid/blank votes	276	0.79		268	0.77		
Total votes	34,979	100.00		34,647	100.00		
Registered voters/turnout	59,979	58.32		59,979	57.77		
Source: Electoral Commission

=== By-elections from November 2021 ===
The following by-elections were held to fill vacant ward seats in the period from the election in November 2021.

Date	Ward	Party of the previous councillor	Party of the newly elected councillor
26 April 2023	5	African National Congress	African National Congress

== November 2026 election ==
At the election of 4 November 2026, the Democratic Alliance won a majority with 18 seats.

Party	Ward			List			Total seats
Party	Votes	%	Seats	Votes	%	Seats	Total seats
Democratic Alliance	26,229	60.56	11	26,599	61.45	7	18
African National Congress	5,932	13.70	4	5,799	13.40	0	4
Freedom Front Plus	3,864	8.92	0	3,749	8.66	3	3
Land Party	1,946	4.49	0	2,004	4.63	1	1
Patriotic Alliance	1,672	3.86	0	1,695	3.92	1	1
African Christian Democratic Party	774	1.79	0	770	1.78	1	1
uMkhonto weSizwe Party	666	1.54	0	668	1.54	1	1
Economic Freedom Fighters	493	1.14	0	464	1.07	0	0
African Transformation Movement	426	0.98	0	516	1.19	0	0
Organic Humanity Movement	529	1.22	0	287	0.66	0	0
South African Communist Party	178	0.41	0	179	0.41	0	0
National Coloured Congress	167	0.39	0	176	0.41	0	0
Alliance of Citizens for Change	156	0.36	0	108	0.25	0	0
Cape Independence Party	134	0.31	0	129	0.30	0	0
Independent Candidates Alliance	63	0.15	0	36	0.08	0	0
People's Movement for Change	38	0.09	0	54	0.12	0	0
Afrika Mayibuye Movement	26	0.06	0	22	0.05	0	0
Pan Africanist Congress of Azania	17	0.04	0	28	0.06	0	0
Total	43,310	100.00	15	43,283	100.00	14	29
Valid votes	43,310	99.50		43,283	99.40		
Invalid/blank votes	216	0.50		260	0.60		
Total votes	43,526	100.00		43,543	100.00		
Registered voters/turnout	70,050	62.14		70,050	62.16		
