= Theewaterskloof Local Municipality elections =

Local elections in South Africa

The Theewaterskloof Local Municipality council consists of twenty-seven members elected by mixed-member proportional representation. Fourteen councillors are elected by first-past-the-post voting in fourteen wards. At the same time, the remaining thirteen are chosen from party lists so that the total number of party representatives is proportional to the number of votes received.

In the election of 4 November 2026, no party won a majority. The Democratic Alliance won the most seats.

== Results ==
The following table shows the composition of the council after past elections.

Event	ANC	DA	EFF	FF+	GOOD	PA	Other	Total
2000 election	9	9	—	—	—	—	1	19
2002 floor-crossing	10	4	—	—	—	—	5	19
2004 floor-crossing	13	4	—	—	—	—	2	19
2006 election	10	9	—	—	—	—	4	23
2007 floor-crossing	10	10	—	—	—	—	3	23
2011 election	9	13	—	—	—	—	3	25
2016 election	10	14	1	0	—	—	2	27
2021 election	8	11	1	1	3	2	1	27
2026 election	7	11	1	1	1	4	2	27

== December 2000 election ==
The following table shows the results of the 2000 election.

Party	Ward			List			Total seats
Party	Votes	%	Seats	Votes	%	Seats	Total seats
Democratic Alliance	8,296	45.83	5	8,722	48.29	4	9
African National Congress	8,257	45.61	5	8,325	46.10	4	9
The Cape Peoples Congress	710	3.92	0	617	3.42	1	1
Independent candidates	689	3.81	0				0
United Democratic Movement	151	0.83	0	396	2.19	0	0
Total	18,103	100.00	10	18,060	100.00	9	19
Valid votes	18,103	97.85		18,060	97.62		
Invalid/blank votes	398	2.15		441	2.38		
Total votes	18,501	100.00		18,501	100.00		
Registered voters/turnout	34,476	53.66		34,476	53.66		

=== By-elections from December 2000 to October 2002 ===
The following by-elections were held to fill vacant ward seats in the period between the election in December 2000 and the floor crossing period in October 2002.

Date	Ward	Party of the previous councillor	Party of the newly elected councillor
27 February 2002	9	Democratic Alliance	African National Congress

=== October 2002 floor crossing ===
In terms of the Eighth Amendment of the Constitution and the judgment of the Constitutional Court in United Democratic Movement v President of the Republic of South Africa and Others, in the period from 8–22 October 2002 councillors had the opportunity to cross the floor to a different political party without losing their seats. In the Theewaterskloof council, four councillors from the Democratic Alliance (DA) crossed to the New National Party (NNP), which had formerly been part of the DA.

Party	Seats before	Net change	Seats after
African National Congress	10	0	10
Democratic Alliance	8	▼4	4
New National Party	–	▲4	4
The Cape Peoples Congress	1	0	1

=== By-elections from October 2002 to August 2004 ===
The following by-elections were held to fill vacant ward seats in the period between the floor crossing periods in October 2002 and September 2004.

Date	Ward	Party of the previous councillor	Party of the newly elected councillor
18 June 2003	10	African National Congress	African National Congress

=== September 2004 floor crossing ===
Another floor-crossing period occurred on 1–15 September 2004, in which three of the NNP councillors crossed to the ANC.

Party	Seats before	Net change	Seats after
African National Congress	10	▲3	13
Democratic Alliance	4	0	4
New National Party	4	▼3	1
The Cape Peoples Congress	1	0	1

== March 2006 election ==
The following table shows the results of the 2006 election.

Party	Ward			List			Total seats
Party	Votes	%	Seats	Votes	%	Seats	Total seats
African National Congress	6,943	42.32	7	6,910	42.22	3	10
Democratic Alliance	6,234	38.00	5	6,213	37.96	4	9
Independent Democrats	1,464	8.92	0	1,729	10.56	2	2
African Christian Democratic Party	697	4.25	0	658	4.02	1	1
United Democratic Movement	369	2.25	0	379	2.32	1	1
Freedom Front Plus	242	1.48	0	236	1.44	0	0
The Cape Peoples Congress	104	0.63	0	190	1.16	0	0
Independent candidates	281	1.71	0				0
Federation of Democrats	71	0.43	0	51	0.31	0	0
Total	16,405	100.00	12	16,366	100.00	11	23
Valid votes	16,405	98.02		16,366	97.99		
Invalid/blank votes	331	1.98		335	2.01		
Total votes	16,736	100.00		16,701	100.00		
Registered voters/turnout	39,665	42.19		39,665	42.11		

=== By-elections from March 2006 to August 2007 ===
The following by-elections were held to fill vacant ward seats in the period between the election in March 2006 and the floor crossing period in September 2007.

Date	Ward	Party of the previous councillor	Party of the newly elected councillor
23 May 2007	1	African National Congress	African National Congress

=== September 2007 floor crossing ===
The final floor-crossing period occurred on 1–15 September 2007; floor-crossing was subsequently abolished in 2008 by the Fifteenth Amendment of the Constitution. In the Theewaterskloof council the single councillor representing the United Democratic Movement crossed to the Democratic Alliance.

Party	Seats before	Net change	Seats after
African National Congress	10	0	10
Democratic Alliance	9	▲1	10
Independent Democrats	2	0	2
African Christian Democratic Party	1	0	1
United Democratic Movement	1	▼1	0

=== By-elections from September 2007 to May 2011 ===
The following by-elections were held to fill vacant ward seats in the period between the floor crossing period in September 2007 and the election in May 2011.

Date	Ward	Party of the previous councillor	Party of the newly elected councillor
10 December 2008	1	African National Congress	Democratic Alliance
10 December 2008	7	African National Congress	Independent Democrats
10 December 2008	9	African National Congress	Democratic Alliance
24 March 2010	4	Democratic Alliance	Democratic Alliance
26 May 2010	12	African National Congress	Democratic Alliance
10 November 2010	7	Independent Democrats	Democratic Alliance

== May 2011 election ==
The following table shows the results of the 2011 election.

Party	Ward			List			Total seats
Party	Votes	%	Seats	Votes	%	Seats	Total seats
Democratic Alliance	14,091	49.80	10	14,236	50.24	3	13
African National Congress	10,540	37.25	3	10,681	37.69	6	9
Congress of the People	822	2.91	0	791	2.79	1	1
National People's Party	774	2.74	0	700	2.47	1	1
National Independent Civic Organisation	642	2.27	0	604	2.13	1	1
African Christian Democratic Party	499	1.76	0	452	1.60	0	0
United Democratic Movement	413	1.46	0	402	1.42	0	0
African Bond of Unity	288	1.02	0	267	0.94	0	0
Western Cape Community	144	0.51	0	145	0.51	0	0
Cape Party	25	0.09	0	58	0.20	0	0
Independent candidates	56	0.20	0				0
Total	28,294	100.00	13	28,336	100.00	12	25
Valid votes	28,294	98.61		28,336	98.60		
Invalid/blank votes	399	1.39		403	1.40		
Total votes	28,693	100.00		28,739	100.00		
Registered voters/turnout	48,092	59.66		48,092	59.76		

=== By-elections from May 2011 to August 2016 ===
The following by-elections were held to fill vacant ward seats in the period between the elections in May 2011 and August 2016.

Date	Ward	Party of the previous councillor	Party of the newly elected councillor
25 April 2012	11	Democratic Alliance	Democratic Alliance
26 November 2014	11	Democratic Alliance	Democratic Alliance
3 June 2015	5	Democratic Alliance	Democratic Alliance
30 September 2015	11	Democratic Alliance	African National Congress

== August 2016 election ==
The following table shows the results of the 2016 election.

Party	Ward			List			Total seats
Party	Votes	%	Seats	Votes	%	Seats	Total seats
Democratic Alliance	16,103	49.64	9	16,882	52.30	5	14
African National Congress	11,650	35.92	5	11,873	36.78	5	10
United Front of the Eastern Cape	1,113	3.43	0	1,154	3.57	1	1
Economic Freedom Fighters	799	2.46	0	820	2.54	1	1
Independent candidates	1,451	4.47	0				0
Independent Civic Organisation of South Africa	442	1.36	0	480	1.49	1	1
United Democratic Movement	433	1.33	0	417	1.29	0	0
Freedom Front Plus	229	0.71	0	260	0.81	0	0
African Christian Democratic Party	163	0.50	0	281	0.87	0	0
People's Democratic Movement	31	0.10	0	62	0.19	0	0
The Peoples Independent Civic Organisation	23	0.07	0	53	0.16	0	0
Total	32,437	100.00	14	32,282	100.00	13	27
Valid votes	32,437	97.16		32,282	97.08		
Invalid/blank votes	947	2.84		971	2.92		
Total votes	33,384	100.00		33,253	100.00		
Registered voters/turnout	56,687	58.89		56,687	58.66		

The local council sends five representatives to the council of the Overberg District Municipality: three from the Democratic Alliance and two from the African National Congress.

== November 2021 election ==
The following table shows the results of the 2021 election.

Party	Ward			List			Total seats
Party	Votes	%	Seats	Votes	%	Seats	Total seats
Democratic Alliance	10,592	41.34	10	10,811	42.01	1	11
African National Congress	7,329	28.60	4	7,357	28.59	4	8
Good	2,668	10.41	0	2,550	9.91	3	3
Patriotic Alliance	1,345	5.25	0	1,313	5.10	2	2
Freedom Front Plus	1,057	4.13	0	955	3.71	1	1
Economic Freedom Fighters	840	3.28	0	879	3.42	1	1
Socialist Revolutionary Workers Party	364	1.42	0	403	1.57	1	1
Independent Civic Organisation of South Africa	362	1.41	0	352	1.37	0	0
Western Province Party	302	1.18	0	308	1.20	0	0
Spectrum National Party	251	0.98	0	187	0.73	0	0
United Democratic Movement	165	0.64	0	256	0.99	0	0
Land Party	82	0.32	0	131	0.51	0	0
Cape Independence Party	78	0.30	0	106	0.41	0	0
Congress of the People	39	0.15	0	79	0.31	0	0
United Independent Movement	59	0.23	0	49	0.19	0	0
Independent candidates	90	0.35	0				0
Total	25,623	100.00	14	25,736	100.00	13	27
Valid votes	25,623	98.30		25,736	98.66		
Invalid/blank votes	443	1.70		349	1.34		
Total votes	26,066	100.00		26,085	100.00		
Registered voters/turnout	59,900	43.52		59,900	43.55		

The African National Congress and the Patriotic Alliance (PA), supported by Good, formed a minority coalition, with the PA's Kallie Papier elected as mayor, Good's John Michels as deputy and the ANC's Derick Appel as speaker.

=== By-elections from November 2021 ===
The following by-elections were held to fill vacant ward seats in the period since the election in November 2021.

Date	Ward	Party of the previous councillor	Party of the newly elected councillor
10 Dec 2025	6	African National Congress	African National Congress

== November 2026 election ==
The following table shows the results of the 2026 election.

Party	Ward			List			Total seats
Party	Votes	%	Seats	Votes	%	Seats	Total seats
Democratic Alliance	12,174	39.32	10	12,440	39.80	1	11
African National Congress	7,533	24.33	4	7,633	24.42	3	7
Patriotic Alliance	4,190	13.53	0	4,177	13.36	4	4
Freedom Front Plus	1,299	4.20	0	1,220	3.90	1	1
National Coloured Congress	1,199	3.87	0	1,178	3.77	1	1
Good	1,166	3.77	0	1,060	3.39	1	1
Economic Freedom Fighters	893	2.88	0	942	3.01	1	1
South African Communist Party	513	1.66	0	482	1.54	1	1
People's Movement for Change	478	1.54	0	454	1.45	0	0
uMkhonto weSizwe Party	387	1.25	0	389	1.24	0	0
Khoi Aboriginal Party	309	1.00	0	302	0.97	0	0
African Christian Democratic Party	224	0.72	0	255	0.82	0	0
Aboriginal Warriors 4 Economic Hope!	147	0.47	0	139	0.44	0	0
SAKK Military Veterans Party	127	0.41	0	151	0.48	0	0
African Transformation Movement	73	0.24	0	155	0.50	0	0
South Africa First	87	0.28	0	67	0.21	0	0
Pan Africanist Congress of Azania	70	0.23	0	70	0.22	0	0
Cape Independence Party	47	0.15	0	51	0.16	0	0
Land Party	13	0.04	0	62	0.20	0	0
Afrika Mayibuye Movement	24	0.08	0	28	0.09	0	0
Independent candidates	12	0.04	0				0
Total	30,965	100.00	14	31,255	100.00	13	27
Valid votes	30,965	98.60		31,255	98.80		
Invalid/blank votes	440	1.40		379	1.20		
Total votes	31,405	100.00		31,634	100.00		
Registered voters/turnout	65,995	47.59		65,995	47.93		
