= Laingsburg Local Municipality elections =

Local elections in the Western Cape, South Africa

The Laingsburg Local Municipality council consists of ten members elected by mixed-member proportional representation. Five councillors are elected by first-past-the-post voting in five wards, while the remaining five are chosen from party lists so that the total number of party representatives is proportional to the number of votes received.

In the election of 3 August 2016 no party obtained a majority; the African National Congress (ANC) and the Democratic Alliance (DA) won three seats each, and the Karoo Ontwikkelings Party (KOP; Karoo Development Party) won the remaining seat. Initially the DA and KOP formed a coalition to govern the municipality, but in March 2017 the KOP broke with the DA and formed a new coalition with the ANC.

In the election of 1 November 2021 no party obtained a majority of seats on the council, with the Democratic Alliance (DA) winning three seats, and the Karoo Ontwikkelings Party losing all of its seats. The African National Congress (ANC) subsequently formed a coalition with the Karoo Democratic Force (KDF) and the Patriotic Alliance to govern the municipality with the PA's Mitchell John Smith voted in as mayor.

In the election of 4 November 2024, ActionSA and the DA both obtained three seats.

== Results ==
The following table shows the composition of the council after past elections.

Event	ANC	DA	FF+	PA	Other	Total
2000 election	3	3	—	—	—	6
2002 floor-crossing	4	2	—	—	—	6
2006 election	2	2	—	—	2	6
2007 floor-crossing	2	2	—	—	2	6
2011 election	3	3	—	—	1	7
2016 election	3	3	—	—	1	7
2021 election	2	3	1	1	0	7
2026 election	2	3	1	1	3	10

== December 2000 election ==
The following table shows the results of the 2000 election.

Party	Votes	%	Seats
African National Congress	1,442	57.45	3
Democratic Alliance	1,068	42.55	3
Total	2,510	100.00	6
Valid votes	2,510	98.74	
Invalid/blank votes	32	1.26	
Total votes	2,542	100.00	
Registered voters/turnout	3,460	73.47	

=== September 2004 floor crossing ===
In terms of the Eighth Amendment of the Constitution, in the period from 1–15 September 2004 councillors had the opportunity to cross the floor to a different political party without losing their seats. In the Laingsburg council, one councillor crossed from the Democratic Alliance (DA) to the African National Congress.

Party	Seats before	Net change	Seats after
African National Congress	3	▲1	4
Democratic Alliance	3	▼1	2

== March 2006 election ==
The following table shows the results of the 2006 election.

Party	Votes	%	Seats
Laingsburg Gemeenskaps Party	954	40.25	2
African National Congress	785	33.12	2
Democratic Alliance	592	24.98	2
Independent Democrats	39	1.65	0
Total	2,370	100.00	6
Valid votes	2,370	98.79	
Invalid/blank votes	29	1.21	
Total votes	2,399	100.00	
Registered voters/turnout	3,697	64.89	

=== September 2007 floor crossing ===
The final floor-crossing period occurred on 1–15 September 2007; floor-crossing was subsequently abolished in 2008 by the Fifteenth Amendment of the Constitution. In the Laingsburg council, the two councillors of the Laingsburg Gemeenskaps Party crossed to the National People's Party.

Party	Seats before	Net change	Seats after
African National Congress	2	0	2
Democratic Alliance	2	0	2
National People's Party	—	▲2	2
Laingsburg Gemeenskaps Party	2	▼2	0

== May 2011 election ==
The following table shows the results of the 2011 election.

Party	Ward			List			Total seats
Party	Votes	%	Seats	Votes	%	Seats	Total seats
Democratic Alliance	1,246	40.39	2	1,254	40.57	1	3
African National Congress	1,164	37.73	2	1,171	37.88	1	3
Congress of the People	280	9.08	0	276	8.93	1	1
National People's Party	216	7.00	0	213	6.89	0	0
African Christian Democratic Party	143	4.64	0	142	4.59	0	0
South African Progressive Civic Organisation	36	1.17	0	35	1.13	0	0
Total	3,085	100.00	4	3,091	100.00	3	7
Valid votes	3,085	98.56		3,091	98.75		
Invalid/blank votes	45	1.44		39	1.25		
Total votes	3,130	100.00		3,130	100.00		
Registered voters/turnout	4,150	75.42		4,150	75.42		

== August 2016 election ==
The following table shows the results of the 2016 election.

Party	Ward			List			Total seats
Party	Votes	%	Seats	Votes	%	Seats	Total seats
African National Congress	1,449	46.00	1	1,458	46.17	2	3
Democratic Alliance	1,384	43.94	3	1,384	43.83	0	3
Karoo Ontwikkelings Party	63	2.00	0	221	7.00	1	1
Congress of the People	79	2.51	0	77	2.44	0	0
Independent candidates	151	4.79	0				0
Economic Freedom Fighters	24	0.76	0	18	0.57	0	0
Total	3,150	100.00	4	3,158	100.00	3	7
Valid votes	3,150	98.04		3,158	98.29		
Invalid/blank votes	63	1.96		55	1.71		
Total votes	3,213	100.00		3,213	100.00		
Registered voters/turnout	4,494	71.50		4,494	71.50		

The local council sends one representative to the council of the Central Karoo District Municipality. As of February 2017 that councillor is from the Democratic Alliance.

== November 2021 election ==
The following table shows the results of the 2021 election.

Party	Ward			List			Total seats
Party	Votes	%	Seats	Votes	%	Seats	Total seats
African National Congress	861	26.86	1	833	25.65	1	2
Karoo Democratic Force	749	23.37	0	827	25.46	1	1
Democratic Alliance	781	24.37	3	749	23.06	0	3
Patriotic Alliance	433	13.51	0	462	14.22	1	1
Karoo Ontwikkelings Party	197	6.15	0	198	6.10	0	0
Freedom Front Plus	124	3.87	0	124	3.82	0	0
Economic Freedom Fighters	39	1.22	0	35	1.08	0	0
Karoo Gemeenskap Party	21	0.66	0	20	0.62	0	0
Total	3,205	100.00	4	3,248	100.00	3	7
Valid votes	3,205	99.20		3,248	98.93		
Invalid/blank votes	26	0.80		35	1.07		
Total votes	3,231	100.00		3,283	100.00		
Registered voters/turnout	4,770	67.74		4,770	68.83		

== November 2026 election ==
The following table shows the results of the 2026 election.

Party	Ward			List			Total seats
Party	Votes	%	Seats	Votes	%	Seats	Total seats
ActionSA	895	26.84	2	881	26.34	1	3
Democratic Alliance	837	25.10	1	856	25.59	2	3
African National Congress	828	24.84	2	808	24.16	0	2
People's Movement for Change	282	8.46	0	300	8.97	1	1
Patriotic Alliance	232	6.96	0	259	7.74	1	1
Community First Party	126	3.78	0	123	3.68	0	0
Freedom Front Plus	107	3.21	0	93	2.78	0	0
Economic Freedom Fighters	17	0.51	0	15	0.45	0	0
Karoo Democratic Force	7	0.21	0	6	0.18	0	0
Afrika Mayibuye Movement	3	0.09	0	4	0.12	0	0
Total	3,334	100.00	5	3,345	100.00	5	10
Valid votes	3,334	99.02		3,345	99.14		
Invalid/blank votes	33	0.98		29	0.86		
Total votes	3,367	100.00		3,374	100.00		
Registered voters/turnout	5,288	63.67		5,288	63.80		
