= Kannaland Local Municipality elections =

Local elections in the Western Cape, South Africa

The Kannaland Local Municipality council consists of ten members elected by mixed-member proportional representation. Five councillors are elected by first-past-the-post voting in five wards, while the remaining five are chosen from party lists so that the total number of party representatives is proportional to the number of votes received.

== Results ==
The following table shows the composition of the council after past elections.

Event	ANC	DA	ICO	Other	Total
2000 election	4	4	—	1	9
2002 floor-crossing	6	1	—	2	9
2004 floor-crossing	7	1	—	1	9
2006 election	4	2	2	1	9
2007 floor-crossing	1	2	0	6	9
2011 election	2	2	3	0	7
2016 election	2	2	3	0	7
2021 election	2	1	3	1	7
2026 election	1	3	3	3	10

== December 2000 election ==
The following table shows the results of the 2000 election.

Party	Ward			List			Total seats
Party	Votes	%	Seats	Votes	%	Seats	Total seats
Democratic Alliance	3,223	46.23	4	3,359	48.49	0	4
African National Congress	3,135	44.97	1	3,136	45.27	3	4
Pan Africanist Congress of Azania	363	5.21	0	432	6.24	1	1
Independent candidates	250	3.59	0				0
Total	6,971	100.00	5	6,927	100.00	4	9
Valid votes	6,971	98.38		6,927	97.78		
Invalid/blank votes	115	1.62		157	2.22		
Total votes	7,086	100.00		7,084	100.00		
Registered voters/turnout	10,164	69.72		10,164	69.70		

=== October 2002 floor crossing ===
In terms of the Eighth Amendment of the Constitution and the judgment of the Constitutional Court in United Democratic Movement v President of the Republic of South Africa and Others, in the period from 8–22 October 2002 councillors had the opportunity to cross the floor to a different political party without losing their seats.

In the Kannaland council, three councillors from the Democratic Alliance (DA) crossed the floor: one to the New National Party (NNP) which had formerly been part of the DA, one to the African National Congress (ANC), and one to sit as an independent. The single councillor from the Pan Africanist Congress also crossed to the ANC.

Party	Seats before	Net change	Seats after
African National Congress	4	▲2	6
Democratic Alliance	4	▼3	1
New National Party	—	▲1	1
Independent	—	▲1	1
Pan Africanist Congress of Azania	1	▼1	0

=== September 2004 floor crossing ===
Another floor-crossing period occurred on 1–15 September 2004, in which the single NNP councillor crossed to the ANC.

Party	Seats before	Net change	Seats after
African National Congress	6	▲1	7
Democratic Alliance	1	0	1
New National Party	1	▼1	0
Independent	1	0	1

== March 2006 election ==
The following table shows the results of the 2006 election.

Party	Ward			List			Total seats
Party	Votes	%	Seats	Votes	%	Seats	Total seats
African National Congress	2,718	39.07	3	2,738	39.34	1	4
Democratic Alliance	1,134	16.30	1	1,832	26.32	1	2
Independent Civic Organisation of South Africa	1,493	21.46	1	1,469	21.11	1	2
Independent Democrats	655	9.41	0	749	10.76	1	1
Independent candidates	849	12.20	0				0
Inkatha Freedom Party	93	1.34	0	109	1.57	0	0
United Independent Front	15	0.22	0	63	0.91	0	0
Total	6,957	100.00	5	6,960	100.00	4	9
Valid votes	6,957	97.71		6,960	97.70		
Invalid/blank votes	163	2.29		164	2.30		
Total votes	7,120	100.00		7,124	100.00		
Registered voters/turnout	11,553	61.63		11,553	61.66		

=== September 2007 floor crossing ===
The final floor-crossing period occurred on 1–15 September 2007; floor-crossing was subsequently abolished in 2008 by the Fifteenth Amendment of the Constitution. In the Kannaland council, three councillors from the ANC and two from the Independent Civic Organisation crossed to the newly-formed National People's Party.

Party	Seats before	Net change	Seats after
National People's Party	—	▲5	5
African National Congress	4	▼3	1
Democratic Alliance	2	0	2
Independent Democrats	1	0	1
Independent Civic Organisation of South Africa	2	▼2	0

=== By-elections from September 2007 to May 2011 ===
The following by-elections were held to fill vacant ward seats in the period between the floor crossing period in September 2007 and the election in May 2011.

Date	Ward	Party of the previous councillor	Party of the newly elected councillor
29 October 2008	5	National People's Party (Note: The ward councillor had been elected for the Independent Civic Organisation (ICOSA) but subsequently crossed the floor to the National People's Party (NPP); he was re-elected once again for ICOSA.)	Independent Civic Organisation of South Africa
24 June 2009	3	National People's Party (Note: The former ward councillor was elected for the African National Congress but had subsequently crossed the floor to the National People's Party.)	African National Congress
24 February 2010	5	Independent Civic Organisation of South Africa	Independent Civic Organisation of South Africa

== May 2011 election ==
The following table shows the results of the 2011 election.

Party	Ward			List			Total seats
Party	Votes	%	Seats	Votes	%	Seats	Total seats
Independent Civic Organisation of South Africa	3,869	41.98	3	3,872	41.94	0	3
African National Congress	2,524	27.38	0	2,581	27.96	2	2
Democratic Alliance	2,162	23.46	1	2,172	23.53	1	2
Universal Civics of South Africa	402	4.36	0	364	3.94	0	0
Congress of the People	91	0.99	0	91	0.99	0	0
Freedom Front Plus	88	0.95	0	81	0.88	0	0
South African Progressive Civic Organisation	81	0.88	0	71	0.77	0	0
Total	9,217	100.00	4	9,232	100.00	3	7
Valid votes	9,217	99.12		9,232	99.19		
Invalid/blank votes	82	0.88		75	0.81		
Total votes	9,299	100.00		9,307	100.00		
Registered voters/turnout	13,088	71.05		13,088	71.11		

== August 2016 election ==
The following table shows the results of the 2016 election.

Party	Ward			List			Total seats
Party	Votes	%	Seats	Votes	%	Seats	Total seats
Independent Civic Organisation of South Africa	4,889	47.78	2	4,949	48.51	1	3
Democratic Alliance	2,735	26.73	1	2,889	28.32	1	2
African National Congress	2,168	21.19	1	2,227	21.83	1	2
Independent candidates	316	3.09	0				0
Economic Freedom Fighters	125	1.22	0	137	1.34	0	0
Total	10,233	100.00	4	10,202	100.00	3	7
Valid votes	10,233	98.55		10,202	98.49		
Invalid/blank votes	151	1.45		156	1.51		
Total votes	10,384	100.00		10,358	100.00		
Registered voters/turnout	14,735	70.47		14,735	70.30		

The local council sends one representative to the council of the Garden Route District Municipality. As of February 2017 that councillor is a representative of the DA.

== November 2021 election ==
The following table shows the results of the 2021 election.

Party	Ward			List			Total seats
Party	Votes	%	Seats	Votes	%	Seats	Total seats
Independent Civic Organisation of South Africa	4,063	45.16	3	4,046	45.24	0	3
African National Congress	1,952	21.70	0	1,908	21.33	2	2
Democratic Alliance	1,838	20.43	1	1,844	20.62	0	1
Kannaland Independent Party	657	7.30	0	686	7.67	1	1
Freedom Front Plus	284	3.16	0	272	3.04	0	0
Africa Restoration Alliance	51	0.57	0	39	0.44	0	0
African Christian Democratic Party	43	0.48	0	43	0.48	0	0
Economic Freedom Fighters	51	0.57	0	33	0.37	0	0
Good	36	0.40	0	40	0.45	0	0
Suid-Kaap Saamstaan	21	0.23	0	33	0.37	0	0
Total	8,996	100.00	4	8,944	100.00	3	7
Valid votes	8,996	98.93		8,944	98.99		
Invalid/blank votes	97	1.07		91	1.01		
Total votes	9,093	100.00		9,035	100.00		
Registered voters/turnout	14,937	60.88		14,937	60.49		

== November 2026 election ==
The following table shows the results of the 2026 election.

Party	Ward			List			Total seats
Party	Votes	%	Seats	Votes	%	Seats	Total seats
Independent Civic Organisation of South Africa	2,655	27.19	2	2,614	27.01	1	3
Democratic Alliance	2,271	23.26	2	2,544	26.28	1	3
Patriotic Alliance	1,492	15.28	1	1,516	15.66	1	2
Kannaland Independent Party	971	9.94	0	913	9.43	1	1
African National Congress	831	8.51	0	845	8.73	1	1
Organic Humanity Movement	441	4.52	0	476	4.92	0	0
Freedom Front Plus	456	4.67	0	458	4.73	0	0
Independent candidates	334	3.42	0				0
Build One South Africa	114	1.17	0	103	1.06	0	0
Ahgaman	92	0.94	0	97	1.00	0	0
Good	38	0.39	0	40	0.41	0	0
Economic Freedom Fighters	34	0.35	0	30	0.31	0	0
National Coloured Congress	15	0.15	0	14	0.14	0	0
Afrika Mayibuye Movement	10	0.10	0	15	0.15	0	0
Cape Independence Party	11	0.11	0	14	0.14	0	0
Total	9,765	100.00	5	9,679	100.00	5	10
Valid votes	9,765	99.29		9,679	99.49		
Invalid/blank votes	70	0.71		50	0.51		
Total votes	9,835	100.00		9,729	100.00		
Registered voters/turnout	16,376	60.06		16,376	59.41		
