= Badih Chaaban =

PR councillor

Badih Chabaan (c. 1960 - 4 September 2017) was a PR councilor in the Cape Town City Council (Subcouncil 17 (Athlone & District)). He was a member of the Africa Muslim Party (AMP) when he was named councilor in August 2006 but later crossed the floor to establish the National People's Party (NPP), which he led as president. In November 2015, he announced his intention to resign from politics and hand over NPP leadership to his daughter.

Chabaan was controversial for both his role in floor crossing politics within Cape Town politics and for the lease he held on trading in Greenmarket Square. For 15 years from 1992 to 2007, he held a lease on 83% of the square and owed the city R3.3 million. His lease was cancelled in 2007 amid accusations of mismanagement, racketeering and corruption.

Chabaan died on 4 September 2017.
