= Truman Prince =

South African politician

Truman Prince is a South African politician, former Central Karoo District Municipality manager, and former Executive Mayor of Beaufort West Local Municipality.

Truman Prince obtained his Honours Degree in Public Administration in 2013, and successfully completed his master's degree in Public Administration in 2015 at the University of the Western Cape, with a thesis entitled "The Challenges of Community Participation at a local level - A case study of the Beaufort West Municipality".

== History ==
Once a member of the African National Congress (ANC), he was expelled from the party in January 2006 when a TV documentary on child prostitution showed him flirting with underage girls at a truck stop in Beaufort West. later founding the Independent Civic Organisation of South Africa (Icosa). He was reinstated as municipal manager by the municipal council in June 2007 after a protracted legal battle, but was fired from his post in August by provincial vote.
