= Africa Muslim Party =

Political party in South Africa

- Leader: Wasfie Hassiem
- Chairperson: Gulam Sabdia
- Founded: 1994
- Headquarters: 10 Rodger Street, Valmary Park, Durbanville, City of Cape Town
- Ideology: Minority politics
- Slogan: Serving the people

Party flag

Website
- africamuslimparty.org

The Africa Muslim Party (AMP) is a South African Muslim political party. It was founded in 1994, with Gulam Sabdia as Chairman and Imtiaz Sooliman as national leader, and competed in the 1994 elections, winning no seats (it had put up 60 candidates for the National Assembly and 25 for the Council of Provinces). It competed in the 1999 elections (as the Africa Moral Party), but only in Western Cape province, achieving 9,513 votes and no seats; the next year, the AMP competed in elections for Cape Town metropolitan area and received 2 seats in the local legislature. The AMP competed again for the Cape Town Metro council in 2006, gaining 3 seats. After the 2006 local government elections, it joined the multi-party coalition led by Democratic Alliance) which supported the mayoral government of the DA's Helen Zille. Its participation in the coalition was short-lived, and it was expelled in January 2007 when it was revealed that AMP councillor Badih Chaaban tried to make a coalition deal with the African National Congress (ANC) in which Chaaban would become the mayor in return for toppling the DA-led coalition. This plot had failed when the Independent Democrats (ID) joined the multi-party coalition and bolstered Zille's position.

The party joined forces with Al Jama-ah for the 2014 elections, campaigning under that party's banner, but again failed to win any seats.

== Controversy ==
The AMP attracted notable controversy, peaking in the 2006 elections, in which a pamphlet which derided the Democratic Alliance's national leader Tony Leon and his wife Michal as "supporters of the racist and murderous Israeli government" was being circulated through Tafelsig, Mitchells Plain. The pamphlet was reproduced on AMP's official stationery, but Wasfie Hassiem, the then national leader, flatly denied any ties between the AMP and the pamphlet, alleging that the AMP was being defrauded. The matter has been referred to the Independent Electoral Commission and Cape Town police. After Badih Chaaban was named AMP city councillor in August 2006, the party came into disrepute over Chaaban's corrupt past business dealings and his failed plot to topple Cape Town mayor Helen Zille.

== Election results ==
=== National elections ===
Election	Total votes	Share of vote	Seats	+/–	Government
1994	34,466	0.18%	0 / 400	–	extraparliamentary

=== Provincial elections ===
Election	Eastern Cape		Free State		Gauteng		Kwazulu-Natal		Limpopo		Mpumalanga		North-West		Northern Cape		Western Cape	
Election	%	Seats	%	Seats	%	Seats	%	Seats	%	Seats	%	Seats	%	Seats	%	Seats	%	Seats
1994	-	0/56	-	0/30	0.31%	0/86	0.49%	0/81	-	0/40	-	0/30	-	0/30	-	0/30	0.98%	0/42
1999	-	0/63	-	0/30	-	0/73	-	0/80	-	0/49	-	0/30	-	0/33	-	0/30	0.60%	0/42
2004	-	0/63	-	0/30	-	0/73	-	0/80	-	0/49	-	0/30	-	0/33	-	0/30	0.70%	0/42
2009	-	0/63	-	0/30	-	0/73	-	0/80	-	0/49	-	0/30	-	0/33	-	0/30	0.22%	0/42

== See also ==
- Badih Chaaban
