= Plaaslike Besorgde Inwoners =

Political party in South Africa

- Leader: Virgil Gericke
- National Assembly seats: 0 / 400
- Provincial Legislatures: 0 / 430

Website
- www.pbionline.org

Plaaslike Besorgde Inwoners (Concerned Local Residents) is a minor political party based in George, South Africa.

The party focuses on corruption, and contested the 2016 municipal elections, earning 3.3% of the proportional representation vote in the George area, and earning two seats in the George Local Municipality. In 2021, the party increased this to 10% and five seats, and also won a seat in the Knysna Local Municipality.

In January 2018, party leader Virgil Gericke called for the George Local Municipality to be placed under administration following infighting within the governing Democratic Alliance and that party's failure to elect replacement councillors following the dismissal of the council's Speaker, Chief Whip and four councillors by Local Government Minister, Anton Bredell.

The party contested the 2019 South African general election at provincial level in the Eastern Cape and Western Cape only, failing to win a seat.

== Election results ==
=== Provincial elections ===
Election	Eastern Cape		Free State		Gauteng		Kwazulu-Natal		Limpopo		Mpumalanga		North-West		Northern Cape		Western Cape	
Election	%	Seats	%	Seats	%	Seats	%	Seats	%	Seats	%	Seats	%	Seats	%	Seats	%	Seats
2019	0.03%	0/63	-	-	-	-	-	-	-	-	-	-	-	-	-	-	0.19%	0/42

=== Municipal elections ===
Election	Votes	%	Seats
2011	3,241	0.01%	1
2016	7,583	0.02%	2
2021	19,563	0.06%	6
