= Independent Civic Organisation of South Africa =

Political party in South Africa

- Abbreviation: ICOSA
- Founder: Truman Prince
- Founded: January 2006
- Split from: African National Congress

The Independent Civic Organisation of South Africa (ICOSA) is a minor South African political party. It was founded by former Karoo District Municipality manager Truman Prince, who was expelled from the African National Congress (ANC) in 2006. He was reinstated as municipal manager by the municipal council in June, 2007, after a protracted legal battle, but was fired from his post in August of that same year through provincial vote. Convicted child rapist Jeffrey Donson, formerly of the National People's Party (NPP), was president of ICOSA until his expulsion in November 2023.

The Democratic Alliance/ICOSA coalition took power in the Kannaland Local Municipality in August 2006 when the short-lived ANC-led coalition pact with the DA collapsed. The coalition of the DA and ICOSA collapsed when two ICOSA and three ANC councillors crossed the floor giving the NPP five seats out of nine in the council or an outright majority (the only such council in SA that was governed by this fledgling new party at the time). The DA refused to recognise the new NPP-led council administration as it alleged that the two ICOSA defectors were sacked prior to the floor-crossing window being open and were then challenged in the Cape High Court. As such its former mayor refused to "step down" pending the outcome of the case, creating uncertainty and instability in this beleaguered council.

In 2011, ICOSA regained its plurality in the Kannaland municipality, and has retained its plurality in the subsequent elections.

== Controversy ==
Leader Jeffrey Donson was convicted of statutory rape and indecent assault of a 15-year-old girl while employed as Kannaland's mayor in 2008, and his deputy Werner Meshoa was convicted of fraud and obstruction of justice during his tenure as speaker on the Kannaland council. After the 2021 South African municipal elections, with the support of the African National Congress, Donson was again elected mayor and Meshoa deputy mayor, leading to strong criticism.

== Leadership struggles ==
In November 2023, the party's Western Cape provincial chair, Dawid Kamfer, approached the Western Cape High Court in an attempt to remove Donson and his son. Donson was suspended as leader in October, a move instigated by Kamfer. However, the party's national executive committee overturned the decision. Kamfer approached the court, arguing that the NEC's term of office had expired, and that the suspension should stand.

As of October 2025, Donson remains leader of the party and mayor of Kannaland.

== Election results ==
=== National elections ===
Election	Total votes	Share of vote	Seats	+/–	Government
2019	12,386	0.07%	0 / 400	–	extraparliamentary

=== Provincial elections ===
Election	Eastern Cape		Free State		Gauteng		Kwazulu-Natal		Limpopo		Mpumalanga		North-West		Northern Cape		Western Cape	
Election	%	Seats	%	Seats	%	Seats	%	Seats	%	Seats	%	Seats	%	Seats	%	Seats	%	Seats
2019	-	-	-	-	0.03%	0/73	-	-	-	-	-	-	-	-	-	-	0.46%	0/42

=== Municipal elections ===
Election	Votes	%	Seats
2016	44,242	0.11%	11
2021	21,273	0.09%	8
