= National People's Party (South Africa, 2007) =

Political party in South Africa

- Leader: Johan van Niekerk
- President: Badih Chaaban
- Second Deputy President: Jameelah Daniels
- National Coordinator: Petrus Roodtman
- Chief Executive Officer: Farriet Stemmet
- Director of Intelligence: Andrew Lyon
- Founded: 30 September 2007
- Dissolved: c. 2016
- Headquarters: 3rd floor, Chaaban House, Prestwich Road, Cape Town
- Ideology: Populism
- Colours: Blue
- Slogan: For the People; Vir die Mense

Website
- www.npp.za.net

The National People's Party (or National Peoples Party) was a political party registered on a national level with the Independent Electoral Commission (IEC) of South Africa. It came into existence when Badih Chaaban, a member of the Cape Town City Council crossed the floor from the Africa Muslim Party (AMP) in an attempt to wrest control of the city council from the Democratic Alliance-led multi-party coalition. The party was set up by Chaaban shortly before the floor crossing period in 2007 with the help of David Sasman, its interim leader. It should not be confused with the National People's Party, renamed the Minority Front, led by Amichand Rajbansi during the apartheid era.

The party has not contested elections since at least 2016 and is presumed defunct.

== Persons ==
Members of the NPP (past and present) include:

- Badih Chaaban
- Jeffrey Donson
- Truman Prince
- Juan-Duval Uys
- Nickey Valentine

== Local government positions ==
The NPP used to hold three council seats on the Cape Town City Council and controlled the Kannaland Local Municipality and the Cape Winelands District Municipality in coalition with the ANC. After the 2011 local government elections, their position was mostly reduced to a small number of seats in opposition on a limited number of councils. The NPP however governed Oudtshoorn Local Municipality in coalition with ANC and ICOSA between 2011 and 2015, when the municipality was placed under administration.

== 2011 local government elections ==
The party challenged the IEC's refusal to accept their candidate nomination lists for the City of Cape Town Metropolitan Municipality's council in the upcoming municipal elections, in the Electoral Court. Judge Pillay of the Electoral Court found that the IEC had been overly zealous in applying the cut-off time, and ordered the commission to allow the NPP to contest the elections.

== NPP during the apartheid era ==
Amichand Rajbansi created a party called the National People's Party (NPP) in August 1981 from the remains of the South African Indian Council. In the 1984 election for the House of Delegates, part of the Tricameral Parliament then created by the South African Constitution of 1983, the NPP won 18 of the 40 seats. The NPP led by Rajbansi became the Minority Front.

The NPP of the apartheid era is not related to the post-2007 NPP.
