= People's Movement for Change (South Africa) =

South African political party

- President: Marius Fransman
- Founded: November 2023
- Split from: African National Congress
- Ideology: Progressivism
- National Assembly seats: 0 / 400

Website
- pmc.org.za

The People's Movement for Change (PMC) is a South African political party formed in November 2023 by Marius Fransman, former Deputy of International Foreign Affairs and former Chairperson of the African National Congress (ANC) in Western Cape.

In February 2024, former Mayor of Cape Town for the Democratic Alliance (DA), Dan Plato, joined the party.

== Election results ==
=== National Assembly elections ===
Election	Party leader	National votes	Share of vote	Seats	+/–	Government
2024	Marius Fransman	5,539	0.03% (Note: From 2024, seats in the National Assembly are determined by a combination of the national ballot, and the nine regional ballots. Only the national ballot figures are shown here.)	0 / 400	New	Extra-parliamentary

=== Provincial elections ===
Election	Eastern Cape		Free State		Gauteng		Kwazulu-Natal		Limpopo		Mpumalanga		North-West		Northern Cape		Western Cape	
Election	%	Seats	%	Seats	%	Seats	%	Seats	%	Seats	%	Seats	%	Seats	%	Seats	%	Seats
2024															0.05	0/30	0.26	0/42

=== Municipal elections ===
The party contested its first municipal election in Theewaterskloof in February 2024, finishing sixth out of six parties, with 2% of the vote.
