= List of political parties in South Africa =

This is a list of political parties in South Africa. For most of its recent history, South Africa has functioned as a democratic state but with a one-party dominant system, with the African National Congress (ANC) as the governing party.

Following the 2024 general election this dominance has declined, as a result the country has been governed by a ten-member coalition called the Government of National Unity consisting of the ANC, Democratic Alliance (DA), Patriotic Alliance, Inkatha Freedom Party, Good, Pan Africanist Congress of Azania, Freedom Front Plus, United Democratic Movement, Al Jama-ah, and Rise Mzansi.

The DA governs the Western Cape Province and a number of municipalities, some of which are coalitions with smaller parties.

== Parliamentary parties ==
Name	Abbr.	Leader	Est.	Main Ideologies	Political position	National Assembly	NCOP	Provincial legislatures	Municipal council seats
African National Congress	ANC	Cyril Ramaphosa	1912	Nationalism; Social democracy	Centre-left to Left Wing	159 / 400	43 / 90	224 / 487	4,549 / 8,794
Democratic Alliance	DA	Geordin Hill-Lewis	2000	Liberalism; Federalism	Centre to Centre-right	87 / 400	21 / 90	97 / 487	1,494 / 8,794
uMkhonto weSizwe; English: Spear of the Nation	MK	Jacob Zuma	2023	Zulu nationalism; Socialism; Social conservatism	Left-wing to Far-left (fiscal); Right-wing to Far-right (social)	58 / 400	9 / 90	58 / 487	786 / 8,794
Economic Freedom Fighters	EFF	Julius Malema	2013	Communism; Pan-Africanism	Far-left	39 / 400	10 / 90	54 / 487	982 / 8,794
Inkatha Freedom Party	IFP	Velenkosini Hlabisa	1975	Conservatism; Constitutional monarchism; Zulu nationalism	Right-wing	17 / 400	2 / 90	16 / 487	544 / 8,794
Patriotic Alliance	PA	Gayton McKenzie	2013	Right-wing populism; Coloured interests	Right-wing to Far-right	9 / 400	2 / 90	10 / 487	85 / 8,794
Freedom Front Plus	VF+	Corné Mulder	1994	Conservatism; Afrikaner interests	Right-wing to Far-right	6 / 400	2 / 90	9 / 487	221 / 8,794
ActionSA	—N/a	Herman Mashaba	2020	Classical liberalism; Libertarianism	Centre-right to Right Wing	6 / 400	1 / 90	5 / 487	90 / 8,974
African Christian Democratic Party	ACDP	Kenneth Meshoe	1993	Christian democracy; Social conservatism	Centre-right to right-wing	3 / 400	0 / 90	2 / 487	49 / 8,794
United Democratic Movement	UDM	Bantu Holomisa	1997	Social democracy	Centre-left	3 / 400	1 / 90	3 / 487	51 / 8,794
Rise Mzansi	RISE	Songezo Zibi	2023	Third Way	Centre-left	2 / 400	0 / 90	1 / 487	0 / 8,794
Build One South Africa	BOSA	Mmusi Maimane	2022	Liberalism	Centre	2 / 400	0 / 90	1 / 487	0 / 8,794
African Transformation Movement	ATM	Vuyolwethu Zungula	2018	Christian democracy; Conservatism	Centre-right	2 / 400	0 / 90	1 / 487	53 / 8,794
Al Jama-ah	ALJAMA	Ganief Hendricks	2007	Islamic democracy	Left-wing (fiscal); Right-wing (social)	2 / 400	0 / 90	1 / 487	12 / 8,794
National Coloured Congress	CCC	Fadiel Adams	2020	Localism; Cape Coloured interests		2 / 400	0 / 90	1 / 487	8 / 8,794
Pan Africanist Congress of Azania	PAC	Mzwanele Nyhontso	1959	African socialism; Black nationalism	Left-wing	1 / 400	0 / 90	0 / 487	21 / 8,794
United Africans Transformation	UAT	Wonder Mahlatsi	2022	Pan-Africanism; Socialism	Left-wing	1 / 400	0 / 90	1 / 487	0 / 8,794
Good	GOOD	Patricia de Lille	2018	Social liberalism	Centre-left	1 / 400	0 / 90	1 / 487	45 / 8,794

== Other parties with representation ==
Name	Abbrev.	Leader	Founded	Main Ideologies	Political position	Municipal council seats
South African Communist Party	SACP	Blade Nzimande	1921	Communism	Left	271 / 8,794
National Freedom Party	NFP	Ivan Rowan Barnes	2011	Egalitarianism; Social democracy	Centre-left	52 / 8,794
African Independent Congress	AIC	Mandla Galo	2005	Social conservatism	Centre-right	43 / 8,794
Forum for Service Delivery	F4SD	Mbahare Johannes Kekana	2015			32 / 8,794
Abantu Batho Congress	ABC	Philani Mavundla	2021			25 / 8,794
MAP16 Civic Movement	MAP16		2018			20 / 8,794
Congress of the People	COPE	Mosiuoa Lekota	2008	Social democracy Social liberalism	Centre-left	13 / 8,794
Independent Civic Organisation of South Africa	ICOSA	Jeffrey Donson	2006			8 / 8,794
African People's Convention	APC	Themba Godi	2007	African nationalism Pan-Africanism	Left-wing	14 / 8,794
African People's Movement	APEMO	Vikizitha Mlotshwa			Centre-left	
United Christian Democratic Party	UCDP	Isaac Sipho Mfundisi	1997	Christian democracy Federalism	Centre-right	6 / 8,794
Team Sugar South Africa	TSSA	Musa Thwala	2019		Far-left	7 / 8,794
Plaaslike Besorgde Inwoners; English: Concerned Local Residents	PBI		2016	Anti-corruption		6 / 8,794
Bolsheviks Party of South Africa	BPSA	Fanie Mogotji	2016	Marxism–Leninism	Far-left	4 / 8,794
United Independent Movement	UIM	Neil de Beer	2020	Centrism	Centre-right	4 / 8,794
African Democratic Change	ADeC	Visvin Reddy	2017	Anti-corruption		3 / 8,794
Better Residents Association	BRA	Delta Mokoena (imprisoned)	2011	Localism		3 / 8,794
Azanian People's Organisation	AZAPO	Nelvis Qekema	1978	Black Consciousness; Socialism	Left-wing to far-left	2 / 8,794
Democratic Liberal Congress	DLC	Patrick Pillay	2016	Liberalism; Environmentalism	Centre	2 / 8,794
International Revelation Congress	IRC	Te Mammba	2013	Social conservatism Social welfare		2 / 8,794
Power of Africans Unity	PAU	Julius Nsingwane	2016			2 / 8,794
South African Maintenance and Estate Beneficiaries Association	SAMEBA	Makgorometse Gift Makhaba	2014			2 / 8,794
Afrikan Alliance of Social Democrats	AASD	Pappie Mokoena	2019	Social democracy Pan-Africanism	Centre-left	2 / 8,794
Africa Restoration Alliance	ARA	Jerome Swartz	2020			2 / 8,794
Minority Front	MF	Shameen Thakur-Rajbansi	1993	Indian interests		1 / 8,794
People's Revolutionary Movement	PRM	Nhlanhla Buthelezi	2016	Social conservatism National conservatism	Left-wing (fiscal); Right-wing (social)	1 / 8,794
Cape Independence Party	CAPEXIT	Jack Miller	2007	Cape independence Direct democracy	Right-wing	2 / 8,794
National People's Front	NAPF	Bheki Gumbi	2018			1 / 8,794

== Non-parliamentary parties ==
- #Hope4SA
- Africa Muslim Party (AMP)
- African Change Academy
- African Christian Alliance (ACA)
- African Congress for Transformation
- African Content Movement (ACM)
- African Covenant (ACO)
- African Mantungwa Community (AC)
- African Renaissance Unity (ARU)
- African Security Congress (ASC)
- Afrikaner Volksparty
- Agang South Africa
- All Things Are Possible
- Alliance for Transformation for All (ATA)
- Alliance of Citizens for Change (ACC)
- Arise SA
- Afrikaner Resistance Movement (AWB)
- Black First Land First (BLF)
- Cape Muslim Congress (CMC)
- Capitalist Party of South Africa (ZACP)
- Change Starts Now (CSN)
- Christian Democratic Party (CDP)
- Civic Warriors of Maruleng (CWM)
- Compatriots of South Africa (CSA)
- Dabalorivhuwa Patriotic Front (DPF)
- Dagga Party (IQELA LE)
- Defenders of the People (DOP)
- Democratic Independent Party (DI)
- Dikwankwetla Party (DPSA)
- Economic Emancipation Forum (EEF)
- ECOPEACE Party (ECOPEACE)
- Federal Party SA (FPSA)
- Free Democrats (FREE DEM)
- Gazankulu Liberation Congress (GLC)
- Green Party of South Africa (GPSA)
- Karoo Democratic Force (KDF)
- Karoo Gemeenskap Party (KGP)
- Keep It Straight and Simple Party (KISS Party)
- Kingdom Governance Movement
- Labour Party
- Land Party (LAND)
- National Conservative Party of South Africa (NKP)
- National People's Ambassadors (NPA)
- National Religious Freedom Party (NRFP)
- New South Africa Party
- Operation Dudula
- Organic Humanity Movement (OHM)
- Pan Africanist Movement (PAM)
- Peace and Justice Congress (PJC)
- People's Movement for Change (PMC)
- Socialist Green Coalition (SGC)
- Socialist Revolutionary Workers Party (SRWP)
- South African Communist Party (SACP) – part of the ANC-led "Tripartite Alliance"
- South African National Congress of Traditional Authorities (SANCOTA)
- South African Political Party (SAPP)
- South African Rainbow Alliance (SARA)
- Spectrum National Party (SNP)
- Sterkspruit Civic Association (SCA)
- The Peoples Independent Civic Organisation (TPICO)
- True Freedom Party
- Truly Alliance (TA)
- Unite for Change
- United Congress (UNICO)
- Uniting People First
- Us the People (US)
- Women Forward (WF)
- Workers and Socialist Party (WASP)
- Ximoko Party (XP)

== Defunct parties ==
Defunct Parliamentary Parties (1994 – Present)
Name	Abbrev.	Founded	Dissolved	Main Ideologies	Peak MPs (year)
Afrikaner Eenheidsbeweging; English: Afrikaner Unity Movement	AEB	1998	2003	Afrikaner nationalism Conservatism	1 (1999)
Democratic Party; Afrikaans: Demokratiese Party	DP	1989	2000	Conservative liberalism Economic liberalism	38 (1999)
Federal Alliance; Afrikaans: Federale Alliansie	FA	1998	2007	Conservatism; Libertarianism	2 (1999)
Independent Democrats	ID	2003	2014	Populism; Social liberalism	7 (2004)
National Party; Afrikaans: Nasionale Party	NP	1914	1997	Christian democracy Conservative liberalism	82 (1994)
New National Party; Afrikaans: Nuwe Nasionale Party	NNP	1997	2005	Civic nationalism Conservatism	28 (1999)

Defunct Parliamentary Parties (1958–1994)
Name	Abbrev.	Founded	Dissolved	Main Ideologies
Conservative Party; Afrikaans: Konserwatiewe Party	KP	1982	2004	Afrikaner nationalism Social conservatism
Labour Party; Afrikaans: Arbeidersparty	AP	1969	1994	Coloured people's rights Anti-apartheid; Labourism; Social democracy
National Union; Afrikaans: Nasionale Unie	NU	1960	1966	Centrism; Social conservatism
New Republic Party; Afrikaans: Nuwe Republiekparty	NRP	1977	1988	Conservatism; Consociationalism
Progressive Federal Party; Afrikaans: Progressiewe Federale Party	PFP	1977	1989	Anti-racism; Liberalism
Progressive Party; Afrikaans: Progressiewe Party	PP	1959	1975	Anti-racism; Liberalism
South African Party; Afrikaans: Suid-Afrikaanse Party	SAP	1977	1980	Conservatism; Federalism
United Party; Afrikaans: Verenigde Party	UP	1934	1977	Conservative liberalism Monarchism

Defunct Parliamentary Parties (1910–1958)
Name	Abbrev.	Founded	Dissolved	Main Ideologies
Afrikaner Party; Afrikaans: Afrikanerparty	AP	1941	1951	Afrikaner nationalism Conservatism
Dominion Party; Afrikaans: Dominiumparty	DP	1934	1948	Conservatism; Monarchism
Herenigde Nasionale Party; English: Reunited National Party	HNP	1940	1948	Afrikaner nationalism Social conservatism
Labour Party; Afrikaans: Suid-Afrikaanse Arbeidersparty	LP	1910	1958	Democratic socialism Social democracy
Purified National Party; Afrikaans: Gesuiwerde Nasionale Party	GNP	1935	1940	Afrikaner nationalism Social conservatism
Roos Party	RP	1929	1935	Afrikaner nationalism Monetary reform
Socialist League	SP	1915	1921	Socialism
Socialist Party	SP	1938	1948	Democratic socialism Social democracy
South African Party; Afrikaans: Suid-Afrikaanse Party; Dutch: Zuidafrikaanse Partij	SAP	1910	1934	Afrikaner nationalism Liberal conservatism
Unionist Party; Afrikaans: Unionisteparty	UP	1910	1920	Monarchism; Protectionism

== Other defunct parties ==
- Abolition of Income Tax and Usury Party (1994–?)
- Boerestaat Party (BSP)
- Christen Party/Christian Party (2005–?)
- Christian Democratic Alliance (?–2009)
- Christian Front (CF) (???–2014)
- Democratic Left Front (2011–2015)
- Democratic Party (DP; 1973–1977)
- Dominion Party (1934–1948)
- Federation of Democrats (2005–?)
- Front Nasionaal (FN; 2013–2020) (previously Federale Vryheidsparty)
- Herstigte Nasionale Party (HNP)
- Independent Party (1987–1989)
- Khoisan Aboriginal and Others Movement (2008–?)
- Liberal Party of South Africa (1953–1968)
- Nasionale Aksie (NA; 2003–2004)
- National Alliance (NA; 2009)
- National Democratic Convention (NADECO; 2005–2009)
- National Democratic Movement (1987–1989)
- National People's Party (NPP; 2007–2016)
- New Labour Party (NLP; 2004–2009)
- Pro-death Penalty Party (2004?)
- Progressive Reform Party (1975–1977)
- Referendum Party (2023–2026)
- Reform Party (1975–1975)
- Socialist Party of Azania (SOPA; 1998–2014)
- South African Business Party (SABP; ?–2012)
- South African Democratic Congress (Sadeco; 2008–2011)
- Ubuntu Party (2012–2020)
- United Independent Front (UIF; 2005–2010)
- Workers Organisation for Socialist Action (WOSA; 1990–?)
- Xiluva (2023–2024)

== See also ==
- Politics of South Africa
- List of political parties by country
- 2026 South African municipal elections
