= Northern Cape (National Assembly of South Africa constituency) =

South African multi-member constituency

- Noord-Kaap; Kapa Bokone
- Constituency for the National Assembly of South Africa
- Location of Northern Cape within South Africa
- Province: Northern Cape
- Population: 1,292,786 (2020)
- Electorate: 656,826 (2024)

Current constituency
- Created: 1994
- Seats: 5: 5 (2009–present); 4 (1994–2009)

Northern Cape (Afrikaans: Noord-Kaap; Tswana: Kapa Bokone) is one of the nine multi-member constituencies of the National Assembly of South Africa, the lower house of the Parliament of South Africa, the national legislature of South Africa. The constituency was established in 1994 when the National Assembly was established by the Interim Constitution following the end of Apartheid. It is conterminous with the province of Northern Cape. The constituency currently elects five of the 400 members of the National Assembly using the closed party-list proportional representation electoral system. At the 2024 general election it had 656,826 registered electors.

== Electoral system ==
200 of the 400 members of the National Assembly are elected by nine constituencies which correspond to the nine provinces of South Africa. These members are elected under a system of closed party-list proportional representation, using the largest remainder method with a Droop quota. From 1994 to 2019 the same ballot paper was used to determine the overall seat allocation of the National Assembly and the allocation of the provincial seats. In the 2024 election a separate "regional" ballot paper was introduced for the provincial seats, which allows for the participation of independent candidates. As of 2024 the Northern Cape constituency elects 5 members.

== Election results ==
=== Summary ===
Election	Pan Africanist Congress PAC			United Democratic Movement UDM			African National Congress ANC			Democratic Alliance DA/DP			New National Party NNP/NP			African Christian Democratic Party ACDP			Inkatha Freedom Party IFP			Economic Freedom Fighters EFF			Freedom Front Plus VF+/VFFF/VV-FF		
Election	Votes	%	Seats	Votes	%	Seats	Votes	%	Seats	Votes	%	Seats	Votes	%	Seats	Votes	%	Seats	Votes	%	Seats	Votes	%	Seats	Votes	%	Seats
2019	417	0.10%	0	246	0.06%	0	239,221	58.23%	3	99,977	24.33%	1				3,143	0.77%	0	138	0.03%	0	39,879	9.71%	1	13,522	3.29%	0
2014	451	0.10%	0	478	0.11%	0	278,540	63.88%	4	101,882	23.36%	1				2,436	0.56%	0	200	0.05%	0	22,083	5.06%	0	5,761	1.32%	0
2009	614	0.15%	0	503	0.12%	0	253,264	61.10%	3	54,215	13.08%	1				4,088	0.99%	0	611	0.15%	0				4,957	1.20%	0
2004	1,384	0.43%	0	1,346	0.42%	0	222,205	68.75%	3	37,533	11.61%	1	23,130	7.16%	0	5,982	1.85%	0	709	0.22%	0				4,827	1.49%	0
1999	2,083	0.64%	0	3,092	0.94%	0	211,206	64.40%	3	18,952	5.78%	0	73,766	22.49%	1	5,295	1.61%	0	1,448	0.44%	0				5,229	1.59%	0
1994	3,941	0.97%					201,515	49.81%		5,235	1.29%		169,661	41.94%		1,294	0.32%		1,902	0.47%					17,480	4.32%	

=== Detailed ===
==== 2024 ====
Results of the regional ballot for the Northern Cape in the 2024 general election held on 29 May 2024:

Party	Votes	%	Seats	+/–
African National Congress	195,531	49.47	3	0
Democratic Alliance	82,767	20.94	1	0
Economic Freedom Fighters	52,314	13.23	1	0
Patriotic Alliance	33,994	8.60	0	0
Freedom Front Plus	7,650	1.94	0	0
Northern Cape Communities Movement	7,016	1.77	0	New
uMkhonto weSizwe	3,005	0.76	0	New
ActionSA	2,027	0.51	0	New
Good	1,870	0.47	0	0
#Hope4SA	1,672	0.42	0	New
African Christian Democratic Party	1,434	0.36	0	0
Build One South Africa	906	0.23	0	New
Congress of the People	785	0.20	0	0
Pan Africanist Congress of Azania	614	0.16	0	0
Azanian People's Organisation	602	0.15	0	0
Rise Mzansi	598	0.15	0	New
African Transformation Movement	412	0.10	0	0
Africa Restoration Alliance	397	0.10	0	New
Inkatha Freedom Party	268	0.07	0	0
United Independent Movement	260	0.07	0	New
Alliance of Citizens for Change	222	0.06	0	New
People's Movement for Change	167	0.04	0	New
United Democratic Movement	153	0.04	0	0
South African Royal Kingdoms Organization	136	0.03	0	New
South African Rainbow Alliance	123	0.03	0	New
Organic Humanity Movement	89	0.02	0	New
Citizans	85	0.02	0	New
Economic Liberators Forum South Africa	68	0.02	0	New
Sizwe Ummah Nation	67	0.02	0	New
Free Democrats	43	0.01	0	0
Total	395,275	100.00	5	–
Valid votes	395,275	98.89		
Invalid/blank votes	4,424	1.11		
Total votes	399,699	100.00		
Registered voters/turnout	656,826	60.85		

The following candidates were elected.

Name	Party
Martha Bartlett	ANC
Erald Cloete	ANC
Sofia Mosikatsi	ANC
Lisa-Maré Schickerling	DA
Florence Tito	EFF

==== 2019 ====
Results of the national ballot for the North West in the 2019 general election held on 8 May 2019:

Party	Votes	%	Seats	+/–
African National Congress	239,221	58.23	3	–1
Democratic Alliance	99,977	24.33	1	0
Economic Freedom Fighters	39,879	9.71	1	+1
Freedom Front Plus	13,522	3.29	0	0
Congress of the People	3,413	0.83	0	0
African Christian Democratic Party	3,143	0.77	0	0
Good	3,088	0.75	0	New
African Independent Congress	1,597	0.39	0	0
African Transformation Movement	612	0.15	0	New
Azanian People's Organisation	586	0.14	0	0
African Security Congress	574	0.14	0	New
Socialist Revolutionary Workers Party	527	0.13	0	New
Afrikan Alliance of Social Democrats	464	0.11	0	New
Pan Africanist Congress of Azania	417	0.10	0	0
Agang South Africa	336	0.08	0	0
African People's Convention	321	0.08	0	0
Independent Civic Organisation of South Africa	253	0.06	0	0
United Democratic Movement	246	0.06	0	0
Front National	222	0.05	0	0
Black First Land First	187	0.05	0	New
Democratic Liberal Congress	157	0.04	0	New
Al Jama-ah	154	0.04	0	0
African Covenant	150	0.04	0	New
African Renaissance Unity Party	143	0.03	0	New
Inkatha Freedom Party	138	0.03	0	0
Compatriots of South Africa	134	0.03	0	New
African Congress of Democrats	125	0.03	0	New
Capitalist Party of South Africa	107	0.03	0	New
National Freedom Party	98	0.02	0	0
Alliance for Transformation for All	94	0.02	0	New
Women Forward	88	0.02	0	0
South African National Congress of Traditional Authorities	87	0.02	0	New
Economic Emancipation Forum	85	0.02	0	New
Patriotic Alliance	78	0.02	0	0
Christian Political Movement	71	0.02	0	New
African Content Movement	61	0.01	0	New
International Revelation Congress	58	0.01	0	New
Free Democrats	57	0.01	0	New
Land Party	55	0.01	0	New
Forum for Service Delivery	54	0.01	0	New
Power of Africans Unity	54	0.01	0	New
African Democratic Change	50	0.01	0	New
Better Residents Association	49	0.01	0	0
Minority Front	39	0.01	0	0
National People's Front	23	0.01	0	New
People's Revolutionary Movement	20	0.00	0	New
South African Maintenance and Estate Beneficiaries Association	16	0.00	0	New
National People's Ambassadors	12	0.00	0	New
Total	410,842	100.00	5	–
Valid votes	410,842	98.46		
Invalid/blank votes	6,406	1.54		
Total votes	417,248	100.00		
Registered voters/turnout	626,471	66.60		

The following candidates were elected: Mirriam Kibi (ANC), Dali Mpofu (EFF), Gizella Opperman (DA), Ntaoleng Peacock (ANC) and Dikgang Stock (ANC).

==== 2014 ====
Results of the 2014 general election held on 7 May 2014:

Party		Votes	%	Seats
African National Congress	ANC	278,540	63.88%	4
Democratic Alliance	DA	101,882	23.36%	1
Economic Freedom Fighters	EFF	22,083	5.06%	0
Congress of the People	COPE	14,452	3.31%	0
Freedom Front Plus	VF+	5,761	1.32%	0
African Independent Congress	AIC	3,805	0.87%	0
African Christian Democratic Party	ACDP	2,436	0.56%	0
United Christian Democratic Party	UCDP	1,461	0.34%	0
Azanian People's Organisation	AZAPO	936	0.21%	0
African People's Convention	APC	681	0.16%	0
Patriotic Alliance	PA	591	0.14%	0
United Democratic Movement	UDM	478	0.11%	0
Pan Africanist Congress of Azania	PAC	451	0.10%	0
Agang South Africa	AGANG SA	450	0.10%	0
Independent Civic Organisation of South Africa	ICOSA	431	0.10%	0
Al Jama-ah		219	0.05%	0
Inkatha Freedom Party	IFP	200	0.05%	0
Workers and Socialist Party	WASP	173	0.04%	0
Front National	FN	164	0.04%	0
National Freedom Party	NFP	141	0.03%	0
First Nation Liberation Alliance	FINLA	128	0.03%	0
Pan Africanist Movement	PAM	128	0.03%	0
Bushbuckridge Residents Association	BRA	103	0.02%	0
Ubuntu Party	UBUNTU	79	0.02%	0
United Congress	UNICO	70	0.02%	0
Minority Front	MF	67	0.02%	0
Keep It Straight and Simple Party	KISS	65	0.01%	0
Kingdom Governance Movement	KGM	51	0.01%	0
Peoples Alliance	PAL	39	0.01%	0
Valid Votes		436,065	100.00%	5
Rejected Votes		7,649	1.72%	
Total Polled		443,714	73.82%	
Registered Electors		601,080		

The following candidates were elected: Joyce Basson (ANC), Karen de Kock (DA), Patrick Mabilo (ANC), Johannes Raseriti Tau (ANC) and Sharome van Schalkwyk (ANC).

==== 2009 ====
Results of the 2009 general election held on 22 April 2009:

Party		Votes	%	Seats
African National Congress	ANC	253,264	61.10%	3
Congress of the People	COPE	66,082	15.94%	1
Democratic Alliance	DA	54,215	13.08%	1
Independent Democrats	ID	19,584	4.72%	0
Freedom Front Plus	VF+	4,957	1.20%	0
United Christian Democratic Party	UCDP	4,559	1.10%	0
African Christian Democratic Party	ACDP	4,088	0.99%	0
Azanian People's Organisation	AZAPO	1,759	0.42%	0
African People's Convention	APC	1,244	0.30%	0
Movement Democratic Party	MDP	727	0.18%	0
Pan Africanist Congress of Azania	PAC	614	0.15%	0
Inkatha Freedom Party	IFP	611	0.15%	0
United Democratic Movement	UDM	503	0.12%	0
Christian Democratic Alliance	CDA	426	0.10%	0
Al Jama-ah		266	0.06%	0
United Independent Front	UIF	236	0.06%	0
Great Kongress of South Africa	GKSA	227	0.05%	0
National Democratic Convention	NADECO	220	0.05%	0
Minority Front	MF	179	0.04%	0
New Vision Party	NVP	163	0.04%	0
South African Democratic Congress	SADECO	135	0.03%	0
Pan Africanist Movement	PAM	100	0.02%	0
Alliance of Free Democrats	AFD	98	0.02%	0
Keep It Straight and Simple Party	KISS	95	0.02%	0
Women Forward	WF	78	0.02%	0
A Party		72	0.02%	0
Valid Votes		414,502	100.00%	5
Rejected Votes		6,988	1.66%	
Total Polled		421,490	75.96%	
Registered Electors		554,900		

The following candidates were elected: Tshoganetso Mpho Adolphina Gasebonwe (ANC), Tina Joemat-Pettersson (ANC), Andrew Louw (DA), Sanna Keikantseeng Molao (COPE) and Ebrahim Mohammed Sulliman (ANC).

==== 2004 ====
Results of the 2004 general election held on 14 April 2004:

Party		Votes	%	Seats
African National Congress	ANC	222,205	68.75%	3
Democratic Alliance	DA	37,533	11.61%	1
New National Party	NNP	23,130	7.16%	0
Independent Democrats	ID	21,379	6.61%	0
African Christian Democratic Party	ACDP	5,982	1.85%	0
Freedom Front Plus	VF+	4,827	1.49%	0
Azanian People's Organisation	AZAPO	1,582	0.49%	0
Pan Africanist Congress of Azania	PAC	1,384	0.43%	0
United Democratic Movement	UDM	1,346	0.42%	0
United Christian Democratic Party	UCDP	994	0.31%	0
Inkatha Freedom Party	IFP	709	0.22%	0
National Action	NA	333	0.10%	0
Peace and Justice Congress	PJC	291	0.09%	0
Employment Movement for South Africa	EMSA	282	0.09%	0
Socialist Party of Azania	SOPA	214	0.07%	0
Christian Democratic Party	CDP	202	0.06%	0
New Labour Party		196	0.06%	0
Keep It Straight and Simple Party	KISS	195	0.06%	0
The Organisation Party	TOP	174	0.05%	0
United Front	UF	156	0.05%	0
Minority Front	MF	87	0.03%	0
Valid Votes		323,201	100.00%	4
Rejected Votes		6,506	1.97%	
Total Polled		329,707	76.04%	
Registered Electors		433,591		

The following candidates were elected: Spetho Enoch Asiya (ANC), Johannes Jacobus Combrinck (ANC), Vytjie Mentor (ANC) and Adriaan Hermanus Nel (DA).

==== 1999 ====
Results of the 1999 general election held on 2 June 1999:

Party		Votes	%	Seats
African National Congress	ANC	211,206	64.40%	3
New National Party	NNP	73,766	22.49%	1
Democratic Party	DP	18,952	5.78%	0
African Christian Democratic Party	ACDP	5,295	1.61%	0
Freedom Front	VFFF	5,229	1.59%	0
United Democratic Movement	UDM	3,092	0.94%	0
Federal Alliance	FA	2,292	0.70%	0
Pan Africanist Congress of Azania	PAC	2,083	0.64%	0
Afrikaner Eenheidsbeweging	AEB	1,686	0.51%	0
Inkatha Freedom Party	IFP	1,448	0.44%	0
Azanian People's Organisation	AZAPO	1,237	0.38%	0
United Christian Democratic Party	UCDP	830	0.25%	0
Abolition of Income Tax and Usury Party	AITUP	387	0.12%	0
Minority Front	MF	182	0.06%	0
Socialist Party of Azania	SOPA	167	0.05%	0
Government by the People Green Party	GPGP	98	0.03%	0
Valid Votes		327,950	100.00%	4
Rejected Votes		7,227	2.16%	
Total Polled		335,177	88.87%	
Registered Electors		377,173		

The following candidates were elected.

Name	Party
Maans Nel	NNP
Elizabeth Phantsi	ANC
Jacobus Frederick van Wyk	ANC
Nelville van Wyk	ANC

==== 1994 ====
Results of the national ballot for the Northern Cape in the 1994 general election held between 26 and 29 April 1994:

Party	Votes	%	Seats
African National Congress	201,515	49.81	2
National Party	169,661	41.94	2
Freedom Front	17,480	4.32	0
Democratic Party	5,235	1.29	0
Pan Africanist Congress of Azania	3,941	0.97	0
Inkatha Freedom Party	1,902	0.47	0
African Christian Democratic Party	1,294	0.32	0
African Moderates Congress Party	864	0.21	0
Minority Front	494	0.12	0
Dikwankwetla Party of South Africa	415	0.10	0
Africa Muslim Party	320	0.08	0
Keep It Straight and Simple Party	293	0.07	0
Sport Organisation for Collective Contributions and Equal Rights	245	0.06	0
African Democratic Movement	189	0.05	0
Workers' List Party	167	0.04	0
Federal Party	162	0.04	0
Women's Rights Peace Party	151	0.04	0
Luso-South African Party	138	0.03	0
Ximoko Progressive Party	113	0.03	0
Total	404,579	100.00	4
Valid votes	404,579	98.86	
Invalid/blank votes	4,663	1.14	
Total votes	409,242	100.00	

The following candidates were elected:

Name	Party
Keppies Niemann	NP
Godfrey Oliphant	ANC
Pieter Saaiman	NP
Mittah Seperepere	ANC
