= Rhoda Southgate =

South African politician

Member of the National Assembly
- In office June 1999 – April 2004
- Constituency: Western Cape

Personal details
- Born: 28 December 1960 (age 65)
- Citizenship: South Africa
- Party: Christian Democratic Alliance; Federation of Democrats; African Christian Democratic Party
- Spouse: Kevin Southgate

Rhoda May Southgate (born 28 December 1960) is a South African politician who represented the African Christian Democratic Party (ACDP) in the National Assembly from 1999 to 2004, serving the Western Cape constituency. After leaving Parliament, she co-founded the short-lived Federation of Democrats (FD) with Louis Green and her husband, Kevin Southgate.

== Legislative career ==
Southgate was born on 28 December 1960. In the 1999 general election, she was elected to represent the ACDP in the National Assembly, serving the Western Cape constituency. During the legislative term, she was a member of the parliamentary delegation that observed the 2002 Zimbabwean presidential election; Southgate deviated from the government's position in telling Parliament that her conscience prevented her from endorsing the election as free and fair.

She was also a spokesman for the ACDP. In a 2003 parliamentary debate, she caused a stir by gagging herself during her allotted speaking time in a protest against parliamentary rules; she said that the rules had "systematically silenced the ACDP", a minor party, insofar as speaking time was allotted in proportion to parties' electoral support.

== Federation of Democrats ==
Southgate was not returned to Parliament in the 2004 general election. During the legislative term that followed, she and her husband Kevin, a former provincial legislator, founded a new opposition party, the FD. The party gained representation in the National Assembly when Louis Green, another ACDP member, crossed the floor in September 2007. Green said that he was leaving the ACDP for the FD as "a matter of principle", because he believed that the Southgates had been mistreated by ACDP leader Kenneth Meshoe. Southgate's husband became the chairman of the FD and Green became party leader; Southgate herself served as Green's personal assistant.

Ahead of the 2009 general election, the FD entered into talks with the Christian Democratic Party and other small conservative parties, leading ultimately to the formation of the Christian Democratic Alliance. Southgate stood for election under the alliance's banner, but she was ranked low on the party list and the alliance did not in any case win any seats.
