= Business Party =

Business Party may refer to:

- Albanian Business Party
- Business Party (Faroe Islands)
- Economic Party (Germany)
- Political Party of Small and Medium-sized Businesses of Ukraine
- South African Business Party
- Fake party (Hungary)
