= Nelson Mandela Bay elections =

Local elections in the Eastern Cape, South Africa

The Nelson Mandela Bay Metropolitan Municipality council consists of one hundred and twenty members elected by mixed-member proportional representation. Sixty councillors are elected by first-past-the-post voting in sixty wards, while the remaining sixty are chosen from party lists so that the total number of party representatives is proportional to the number of votes received.

The council was dominated by the African National Congress (ANC) since its inception in 2000 until 2016. In the 2016 election, the ANC lost its majority and the Democratic Alliance (DA) became the biggest party with 57 seats. This was however 4 seats short of a majority. In August 2016, the DA announced a coalition government with the African Christian Democratic Party (ACDP), the Congress of the People (COPE), and the United Democratic Movement (UDM). The UDM later withdrew, and were replaced by the Patriotic Alliance (PA).

In August 2018, DA councillor Victor Manyati abstained from supporting his party's speaker, Jonathan Lawack. Lawack was removed from his position by 60 votes to 59. The DA and its supporters then left the council, and in their absence, the UDM's candidate Mongameli Bobani was elected mayor, with 61 votes in favour and zero against. Bobani appointed a mayoral committee consisting almost entirely of ANC members. Bobani was ousted as mayor on 4 December 2019 and Thsonono Buyeye of the AIC was his interim successor. Buyeye served in the position until the election of the DA's Nqaba Bhanga in December 2020.

In the election of 4 November 2026 no party obtained a majority. The Democratic Alliance (DA) received the most seats, with fifty-three.

== Results ==
The following table shows the composition of the council after past elections.

Event	ACDP	ANC	COPE	DA	EFF	FF+	PAC	PA	UDM	Other	Total
2000 election	1	72	—	32	—	0	1	—	2	1	108
2006 election	1	81	—	30	—	1	1	—	1	6	120
2011 election	1	63	6	48	—	0	1	—	1	0	120
2016 election	1	50	1	57	6	0	0	1	2	2	120
2021 election	2	48	0	48	8	2	1	2	1	10	120
2026 election	1	32	0	53	7	3	1	4	3	16	120

== December 2000 election ==
The following table shows the results of the 2000 election.

Party	Ward			List			Total seats
Party	Votes	%	Seats	Votes	%	Seats	Total seats
African National Congress	186,965	65.52	34	188,737	65.93	38	72
Democratic Alliance	80,930	28.36	20	81,980	28.64	11	31
United Democratic Movement	5,507	1.93	0	6,864	2.40	2	2
African Christian Democratic Party	2,853	1.00	0	3,485	1.22	1	1
Pan Africanist Congress of Azania	2,964	1.04	0	3,304	1.15	1	1
Independent candidates	3,772	1.32	0				0
African Transformation Efficiency and Affirmative Movement	1,512	0.53	0	1,151	0.40	1	1
Inkatha Freedom Party	852	0.30	0	738	0.26	0	0
Total	285,355	100.00	54	286,259	100.00	54	108
Valid votes	285,355	98.68		286,259	98.85		
Invalid/blank votes	3,815	1.32		3,337	1.15		
Total votes	289,170	100.00		289,596	100.00		
Registered voters/turnout	469,424	61.60		469,424	61.69		

=== October 2002 floor crossing ===
In terms of the Eighth Amendment of the Constitution and the judgment of the Constitutional Court in United Democratic Movement v President of the Republic of South Africa and Others, in the period from 8–22 October 2002 councillors had the opportunity to cross the floor to a different political party without losing their seats.

In the Nelson Mandela Bay council, six councillors crossed from the Democratic Alliance (DA) to the New National Party (NNP), which had formerly been part of the DA. One councillor crossed from the United Democratic Movement to the DA.

Party	Seats before	Net change	Seats after
African National Congress	72	0	72
Democratic Alliance	31	▼5	26
New National Party	–	▲6	6
United Democratic Movement	2	▼1	1
African Christian Democratic Party	1	0	1
Pan Africanist Congress of Azania	1	0	1
African Transformation Efficiency and Affirmative Movement	1	0	1

=== By-elections from October 2002 to August 2004 ===
The following by-elections were held to fill vacant ward seats in the period between the floor crossing periods in October 2002 and September 2004.

Date	Ward	Party of the previous councillor	Party of the newly elected councillor
20 August 2003	43	Democratic Alliance	African National Congress
26 November 2003	52	Democratic Alliance	Democratic Alliance

=== September 2004 floor crossing ===
Another floor-crossing period occurred on 1–15 September 2004. The six councillors of the NNP crossed to the African National Congress (ANC), as did four councillors from the DA. The single councillor of the African Transformation Efficiency and Affirmative Movement crossed to the Liberal Party.

Party	Seats before	Net change	Seats after
African National Congress	73	▲10	83
Democratic Alliance	25	▼4	21
United Democratic Movement	1	▼1	1
African Christian Democratic Party	1	0	1
Pan Africanist Congress of Azania	1	0	1
Liberal Party	—	▲1	1
New National Party	6	▼6	0
African Transformation Efficiency and Affirmative Movement	1	▼1	0

=== By-elections from September 2004 to February 2006 ===
The following by-elections were held to fill vacant ward seats in the period between the floor crossing periods in September 2004 and the election in March 2006.

Date	Ward	Party of the previous councillor	Party of the newly elected councillor
26 January 2005	44	African National Congress	African National Congress
12 October 2005	41	African National Congress	African National Congress

== March 2006 election ==
The following table shows the results of the 2006 election.

Party	Votes	%	Seats		
Party	Votes	%	Ward	List	Total
African National Congress	373,961	66.53	43	38	81
Democratic Alliance	137,099	24.39	17	13	30
Independent Democrats	14,085	2.51	0	3	3
Freedom Front Plus	6,328	1.13	0	1	1
United Democratic Movement	4,970	0.88	0	1	1
African Christian Democratic Party	4,262	0.76	0	1	1
Pan Africanist Congress of Azania	4,098	0.73	0	1	1
Congress Movement of the Coloured People in South Africa	3,785	0.67	0	1	1
United Independent Front	2,600	0.46	0	1	1
Azanian People's Organisation	1,980	0.35	0	0	0
Alliance for Community Transformation	1,169	0.21	0	0	0
Liberal Party	744	0.13	0	0	0
Inkatha Freedom Party	465	0.08	0	0	0
Independents	6,583	1.17	0	–	0
Total	562,129	100.00	60	60	120

== May 2011 election ==
The following table shows the results of the 2011 election.

Party	Votes	%	Seats		
Party	Votes	%	Ward	List	Total
African National Congress	377,138	52.11	34	29	63
Democratic Alliance	291,571	40.29	26	22	48
Congress of the People	35,928	4.96	0	6	6
United Democratic Movement	3,963	0.55	0	1	1
Pan Africanist Congress of Azania	3,959	0.55	0	1	1
African Christian Democratic Party	2,761	0.38	0	1	1
Azanian People's Organisation	1,837	0.25	0	0	0
Freedom Front Plus	1,656	0.23	0	0	0
African People's Convention	1,625	0.22	0	0	0
Christian Democratic Party	1,262	0.17	0	0	0
African Community Movement	1,155	0.16	0	0	0
United Independent Front	536	0.07	0	0	0
South African Progressive Civic Organisation	349	0.05	0	0	0
Independents			0	–	0
Total	723,740	100.00	60	60	120

== August 2016 election ==
The following table shows the results of the 2016 election.

Party	List			Ward			Total seats
Party	Votes	%	Seats	Votes	%	Seats	Total seats
Democratic Alliance	177,551	46.66	33	177,920	46.75	24	57
African National Congress	157,920	41.50	15	153,496	40.34	35	50
Economic Freedom Fighters	19,132	5.03	5	19,819	5.21	1	6
United Democratic Movement	6,969	1.83	2	7,600	2.00	0	2
African Independent Congress	6,144	1.61	1	1,078	0.28	0	1
United Front of the Eastern Cape	3,048	0.80	1	4,133	1.09	0	1
Congress of the People	2,658	0.70	1	2,929	0.77	0	1
African Christian Democratic Party	1,313	0.35	1	1,399	0.37	0	1
Patriotic Alliance	1,110	0.29	1	930	0.24	0	1
Alternative Democrats	942	0.25	0	287	0.08	0	0
Freedom Front Plus	941	0.25	0	976	0.26	0	0
Pan Africanist Congress of Azania	862	0.23	0	447	0.12	0	0
African People's Convention	591	0.16	0	142	0.04	0	0
Independent Civic Organisation	467	0.12	0	256	0.07	0	0
Azanian People's Organisation	358	0.09	0	303	0.08	0	0
Ubuntu Party	143	0.04	0	165	0.04	0	0
Christian Democratic Party	133	0.03	0	1,253	0.33	0	0
Building a Cohesive Society	111	0.03	0	123	0.03	0	0
African Power Movement	96	0.03	0	150	0.04	0	0
Independents				7,142	1.88	0	0
Total	380,489	100.00	60	380,548	100.00	60	120
Valid votes	380,489	98.30		380,548	98.21		
Invalid/blank votes	6,569	1.70		6,954	1.79		
Total votes	387,058	100.00		387,502	100.00		

== November 2021 election ==
Party	List			Ward			Total seats
Party	Votes	%	Seats	Votes	%	Seats	Total seats
Democratic Alliance	105,487	40.04	25	104,520	39.80	23	48
African National Congress	104,339	39.60	11	103,104	39.26	37	48
Economic Freedom Fighters	16,859	6.40	8	16,803	6.40	0	8
Northern Alliance	5,499	2.09	3	5,726	2.18	0	3
African Christian Democratic Party	4,427	1.68	2	4,317	1.64	0	2
Freedom Front Plus	4,310	1.64	2	3,968	1.51	0	2
Defenders of the People	3,640	1.38	2	3,859	1.47	0	2
Patriotic Alliance	3,473	1.32	2	3,724	1.42	0	2
Abantu Integrity Movement	2,914	1.11	1	2,758	1.05	0	1
United Democratic Movement	2,832	1.07	1	2,665	1.01	0	1
African Independent Congress	1,798	0.68	1	990	0.38	0	1
Pan Africanist Congress of Azania	1,347	0.51	1	1,260	0.48	0	1
Good	1,286	0.49	1	1,485	0.57	0	1
African Transformation Movement	683	0.26	0	537	0.20	0	0
United Independent Movement	603	0.23	0	694	0.26	0	0
Congress of the People	587	0.22	0	651	0.25	0	0
United Front of the Eastern Cape	585	0.22	0	539	0.21	0	0
Al Jama-ah	580	0.22	0	475	0.18	0	0
Azanian People's Organisation	426	0.16	0	480	0.18	0	0
Mandela Bay Community Movement	401	0.15	0	131	0.05	0	0
Compatriots of South Africa	271	0.10	0	299	0.11	0	0
Independent South African National Civic Organisation	271	0.10	0	229	0.09	0	0
God Save Africa	211	0.08	0	74	0.03	0	0
Independent Civic Movement	160	0.06	0	101	0.04	0	0
Abantu Batho Congress	125	0.05	0	131	0.05	0	0
Spectrum National Party	118	0.04	0	105	0.04	0	0
Africa Restoration Alliance	116	0.04	0	143	0.05	0	0
The Organic Humanity Movement	113	0.04	0	114	0.04	0	0
Independents				2,720	1.04	0	0
Total	263,461	100.00	60	262,602	100.00	60	120
Valid votes	263,461	98.66		262,602	98.73		
Invalid/blank votes	3,584	1.34		3,370	1.27		
Total votes	267,045	100.00		265,972	100.00		
Registered voters/turnout	583,270	45.78		583,270	45.60		

=== By-elections from November 2021 ===
The following by-elections were held to fill vacant ward seats in the period since November 2021.

Date	Ward	Party of the previous councillor	Party of the newly elected councillor
4 May 2022	29300020	African National Congress	African National Congress
6 Jul 2022	29300043	African National Congress	African National Congress
14 Aug 2024	2	Democratic Alliance	Democratic Alliance
14 Aug 2024	9	Democratic Alliance	Democratic Alliance
2 Jul 2025	57	African National Congress	African National Congress
16 Jul 2025	34	Democratic Alliance	Democratic Alliance
6 Aug 2025	23	African National Congress	African National Congress

== November 2026 election ==
The following table shows the results of the 2026 election.

Party	Ward			List			Total seats
Party	Votes	%	Seats	Votes	%	Seats	Total seats
Democratic Alliance	144,201	43.98	28	145,328	44.37	25	53
African National Congress	83,026	25.32	32	83,975	25.64	0	32
Economic Freedom Fighters	17,876	5.45	0	18,487	5.64	7	7
South African Communist Party	10,926	3.33	0	10,012	3.06	4	4
Patriotic Alliance	10,038	3.06	0	9,856	3.01	4	4
Freedom Front Plus	7,679	2.34	0	8,559	2.61	3	3
United Democratic Movement	7,811	2.38	0	8,011	2.45	3	3
Mayibuye Civic Movement	5,431	1.66	0	7,207	2.20	2	2
ActionSA	5,533	1.69	0	6,316	1.93	2	2
uMkhonto weSizwe Party	3,783	1.15	0	3,963	1.21	2	2
African Christian Democratic Party	3,770	1.15	0	3,238	0.99	1	1
Afrika Mayibuye Movement	3,780	1.15	0	3,009	0.92	1	1
African Transformation Movement	3,687	1.12	0	3,030	0.93	1	1
Pan Africanist Congress of Azania	2,790	0.85	0	2,872	0.88	1	1
Independent candidates	3,847	1.17	0				0
United Progressive People Alliance	1,820	0.56	0	1,771	0.54	1	1
African Independent Congress	1,784	0.54	0	1,602	0.49	1	1
Democratic Movement	1,603	0.49	0	1,406	0.43	1	1
National Alliance	1,040	0.32	0	844	0.26	1	1
Good	905	0.28	0	806	0.25	0	0
Azanian People's Organisation	808	0.25	0	826	0.25	0	0
Al Jama-ah	755	0.23	0	858	0.26	0	0
Defenders of the People	687	0.21	0	723	0.22	0	0
South Africa	731	0.22	0	602	0.18	0	0
Progressive Community Alliance Movement	671	0.20	0	654	0.20	0	0
Eighteen Twelve Movement	590	0.18	0	495	0.15	0	0
Abantu Integrity Movement	432	0.13	0	578	0.18	0	0
African People's Convention	399	0.12	0	369	0.11	0	0
African Peoples Progression	288	0.09	0	408	0.12	0	0
Congress of the People	260	0.08	0	306	0.09	0	0
Sibanye	197	0.06	0	254	0.08	0	0
Organic Humanity Movement	123	0.04	0	282	0.09	0	0
Service Delivery Party	182	0.06	0	112	0.03	0	0
Freedom in South Africa	100	0.03	0	167	0.05	0	0
African Congress for Transformation	6	0.00	0	226	0.07	0	0
Labour Party of South Africa	99	0.03	0	126	0.04	0	0
Economic Emancipation Forum	91	0.03	0	85	0.03	0	0
All Citizens Party	53	0.02	0	109	0.03	0	0
Christ Kingdom Party	71	0.02	0	74	0.02	0	0
United Independent Movement	9	0.00	0				0
Total	327,882	100.00	60	327,546	100.00	60	120
Valid votes	327,882	98.14		327,546	98.24		
Invalid/blank votes	6,201	1.86		5,863	1.76		
Total votes	334,083	100.00		333,409	100.00		
Registered voters/turnout	636,660	52.47		636,660	52.37		
