= Christian Democratic Alliance =

Christian Democratic Alliance may refer to:

- Christian Democratic Alliance (Costa Rica)
- Christian Democratic Alliance (Fiji)
- Christian Democratic Alliance (South Africa)
- Christian-Democratic Alliance (Georgia); See Elections in Georgia

== See also ==
- Christian Democratic Appeal, a Christian-democratic political party in the Netherlands
