= Louis Green (politician) =

South African politician

Member of the National Assembly
- In office May 1994 – May 2009

Personal details
- Citizenship: South Africa
- Party: Congress of the People
- Other political affiliations: Federation of Democrats; African Christian Democratic Party

Louis Michael Green is a South African politician who served in the National Assembly from 1994 to 2009. He was the chief whip of the African Christian Democratic Party (ACDP) until September 2005, when he crossed the floor to the newly founded Federation of Democrats (FD). He has since joined the Congress of the People (COPE).

== Legislative career ==
=== ACDP: 1994–2005 ===
Green served in the National Assembly from 1994 to 2009, gaining election on the ACDP's national list in 1994, 1999, and 2004. He also served as deputy president of the ACDP under president Kenneth Meshoe; he was re-elected unopposed to that position in 2003. As of 2005 he served as the party's chief whip in the assembly.

In 1996, Green and Meshoe – then the ACDP's representatives in the National Assembly – voted against the adoption of the post-apartheid Constitution. Green later said that it had been one of the most difficult decisions of his career but was based on principled support for the death penalty, which was inconsistent with the Constitution. Green was also an opponent of equal rights for gay people: when Njongonkulu Ndungane, the Anglican Archbishop of Cape Town, congratulated Gene Robinson on his consecration, Green reminded Ndungane that homosexuality was "an abomination" in terms of Leviticus and said that "as Christians we cannot interpret God's word to suit modern lifestyles".

During his second term in Parliament, Green was a member of Parliament's ethics committee. He was suspended from the committee in October 2003, apparently for breaching its confidentiality rules, though Green disputed that he had shared any confidential information: during the committee's inquiry into Deputy President Jacob Zuma's financial interests, Green had told the media that Zuma's defence relied for evidence on loan documents that were "only recently drawn up".

=== FD: 2005–2009 ===
On 1 September 2005, during that month's floor-crossing window, Green resigned from the ACDP and defected to the newly established FD. He later said that he had left "on a matter of principle" because he disagreed with how Meshoe had treated Rhoda Southgate, the ACDP parliamentarian who founded the FD. In response Meshoe said that the ACDP was surprised and had not considered Green "a political opportunist".

Green represented the FD until the 2009 general election, in which he was not re-elected. In the 2019 general election, he stood unsuccessfully for election on the list of COPE, another opposition party.
