= Visvin Reddy =

South African politician (born 1970)

The Honourable Visvin Reddy MP

Member of the National Assembly of South Africa
- Incumbent
- Assumed office 25 June 2024

Provincial Leader of uMkhonto weSizwe in KwaZulu Natal
- Incumbent
- Assumed office April 2024
- President: Jacob Zuma
- Preceded by: Position established

President of African Democratic Change
- Incumbent
- Assumed office 7 October 2020
- Preceded by: Moses Mayekiso

Personal details
- Born: Visvin Gopal Reddy; 7 December 1970 (age 55) Shallcross, Durban, Natal, South Africa
- Party: African Democratic Change (2020–present)
- Other political affiliations: uMkontho weSizwe coalition with African Democratic Change (2024–present); African National Congress (2004–2020); Democratic Alliance (2003–2004); Minority Front (1993–2003)
- Spouse: Sharmaine Reddy (m. 1993)

Visvin Gopal Reddy (born 7 December 1970) is a South African businessman and politician from Durban. He has been the leader of African Democratic Change since 2020 and represents the party as a local councillor in the eThekwini Metropolitan Municipality.

Reddy entered politics in 1993 as a founding member of the Minority Front before defecting to the Democratic Alliance (DA) in 2004. After two months as a member of the DA, he spent a decade as a member of the African National Congress. He was also the founder of People Against Petrol and Paraffin Price Increases, a prominent civic organisation in Durban.

== Early life and education ==
Reddy was born on 7 December 1970 in Shallcross, a suburb of Durban in the former Natal Province. His father was a policeman and his mother was a housewife. Classified as Indian under apartheid, he was chairperson of the student representative council at his high school and later at Durban's Springfield College of Education, where he qualified as a teacher with a specialisation in computer science teaching. According to Reddy, he became known as the "Boycott King" for organising student boycotts at the college. He began teaching high school students in 1993, first in Johannesburg and then in Dannhauser.

== Political career ==
=== Minority Front ===
While teaching full-time, Reddy became involved in politics through Amichand Rajbansi's Minority Front (MF), of which he was a founding member in 1993. After the end of apartheid in 1994, Reddy represented the MF as a local councillor, first in the Durban Unicity and then in the eThekwini Metropolitan Municipality. In the December 2000 local elections, in which eThekwini was established, Reddy narrowly won a seat as ward councillor for the township of Chatsworth, Durban: he received 1,552 votes (35.2%) against the 1,483 votes (33.68%) received by the Democratic Alliance (DA). He subsequently quit teaching to pursue politics full-time. He was viewed as the "right-hand man" of MF leader Rajbansi.

By 2001, Reddy was the leader of the MF's caucus in the municipal council, a member of the council's executive committee, and the chairperson of its Tenders and Contracts Committee. In February of that year, managers of two hotels in KwaZulu-Natal accused Reddy of having extorted or solicited bribes from them; he had apparently demanded free weekend stays in exchange for a commitment to send government business to the hotels. Reddy strongly denied the allegation. He told the Independent that he had not had any contact with one of the hotels and that he had accepted a free stay at the other hotel after being assured that it was common practice; he told the Witness that the hotels had offered him accommodation but that he had turned them down. Although the New National Party and Democratic Party called for Reddy to be suspended, the council allowed him to remain in office pending an investigation, and he was firmly defended by Rajbansi.

=== Democratic Alliance ===
In late December 2003, when it transpired that Reddy had applied for full-time administrative jobs in the eThekwini Metropolitan Municipality, Reddy assured the press that he intended to continue to represent the MF. Highlighting his friendship with Rajbansi and his involvement in the party's campaign ahead of the upcoming 2004 general election, he said that he would "be focusing all my energies on ensuring a MF victory". However, on 3 February 2004, Reddy announced at a press conference that he was resigning from the council and from the MF in order to join the DA, a larger opposition party. His resignation triggered a highly competitive by-election in Chatsworth.

Reddy stood for the DA as a candidate for election to the national Parliament in the April 2004 general election, and he was elected to one of the party's eight seats in the KwaZulu-Natal caucus of the National Assembly. However, by the time of the election result, Reddy had already resigned from the DA, and he was not sworn in to his seat.

=== African National Congress ===
Reddy had left the DA in order to join the African National Congress (ANC), the national governing party. He later said that the ANC had approached him and that he had agreed because "I was not comfortable in the DA, so I didn't waste time". In the aftermath of the 2004 general election, the ANC's Mike Sutcliffe, municipal manager of eThekwini, hired Reddy as a contract consultant in his office. The DA and Inkatha Freedom Party objected to his appointment, with the DA alleging that the job offer was the ANC's way of paying its "political debts" to Reddy.

After leaving Sutcliffe's office, Reddy went on to work in administrative positions in the provincial Department of Cooperative Governance and Traditional Affairs, while rising in influence in the ANC. According to the Mail & Guardian, his rise created resentment among some ANC members, who believed that he was elevated because he could swell the membership numbers of the party in eThekwini, thus according the region more weight at the ANC's highly contested 52nd National Conference. He also returned to local government as an eThekwini councillor for the ANC, until the 2011 local elections, when he was excluded from the party's final list of candidates. He nonetheless campaigned for the ANC in 2011, controversially telling a party rally that, "If Jesus were here on election day he would vote ANC."

After vacating the council again in 2011, Reddy left frontline politics to pursue his business career. He owned several restaurants, sports bars, and logistics companies. He also remained active in the ANC and chaired the party's Chatsworth branch.

==== "Go to India" comment ====
In May 2014, Reddy invited controversy by posting in a Facebook comment that Indian critics of the ANC government should "go to India". In his comment, he wrote:

To you anti-ANC commentators... wait until May 8. The ANC will still rule this country. You whiners should leave. Go to India and you will see what a good life we have here. Continue with your garbage and marginalise yourself further. Don’t blame the ANC, blame yourself. You have not yet embraced democracy. Only a foolish Indian in South Africa will not engage the majority constructively...

He declined to retract his remarks afterwards, but said that they reflected his own views rather than those of the ANC. On 3 May, the provincial ANC suspended his membership in the party pending a disciplinary inquiry, saying that his Facebook comment was "out of line with the position of the organisation" and with the organisation's non-racialism.

While suspended, Reddy continued to campaign for the ANC ahead of by-elections in Chatsworth. In June, the DA said that it had laid a complaint against him with the Electoral Commission in connection with an incident in Chatsworth: Reddy had allegedly torn documents from a clipboard held by a DA supporter. However, he denied having been present at all.

Reddy later left the ANC, in his words because "I had gotten tired of the infighting"; he focused on non-partisan community activism thereafter.

=== People Against Petrol and Paraffin Price Increases ===
While pursuing his business career, Reddy became founder and convenor of a lobby group called People Against Petrol and Paraffin Price Increases (Pappi), which protested increases in the price of petrol in South Africa. Reddy said that the group had undertaken to meet with the Russian Embassy about the sale of crude oil to South Africa, and he later claimed that the group had 300,000 followers. It was viewed as highly sympathetic to former President Jacob Zuma of the ANC.

During this period, on 1 May 2019, Minister Gugile Nkwinti appointed Reddy to a four-year term as a member of the board of directors at Umgeni Water, a state-owned entity.

=== African Democratic Change ===
In 2020, Reddy was elected as president of African Democratic Change (Adec), a minor political party founded by Makhosi Khoza. Over the next year, he occasionally received media attention for minor controversies. He was an outspoken advocate for the use of Ivermectin in treating COVID-19, leading protests on the issue and taking a solution of the medicine during a Facebook livestream. Later the same year, the ANC accused him and his party of "despicable provocation and dangerous race-baiting" after an Adec protest called for the release of the "Phoenix heroes", their name for the individuals who faced criminal charges for their involvement in vigilante violence in Phoenix during civil unrest in July.

Under Adec's banner, he stood as a candidate in the 2021 local elections and returned to the eThekwini council as a proportional-representation councillor in November 2021. Under his leadership, Adec and a handful of other small parties joined a coalition with the ANC which allowed the ANC to form a government in the municipality despite its poor electoral showing. However, the coalition fell apart in mid-2022 and Reddy tabled a motion of no confidence in the ANC-led executive committee.

=== UMkhonto we Sizwe ===
On 3 January 2024, Reddy announced after he had a long meeting with former South African president Jacob Zuma that his party, the Adec, would form a coalition with Zuma's UMkhonto we Sizwe (MK) party after the 2024 general elections. Reddy was later appointed the provincial leader of the MK party in KwaZulu-Natal. On 5 March 2024, Reddy threatened violence if the MK party was not allowed to contest the 2024 general elections.

On 9 March 2024, it was revealed that Reddy occupies the 9th position on the MK Party's parliamentary candidate list for the 2024 general elections.

== Personal life ==
In 1993, Reddy married Sharmaine Reddy (née Naidoo) in Chatsworth. She was a teacher and later took early retirement. They live together in Malvern and have three adult children, a daughter and twin sons. Their first-born child, a son named Nivashan, died in a road accident in October 1996 when he was 18 months old; the family's car was caught in a crosswind and trapped under a truck on Van Reenen's Pass near Ladysmith. Reddy and his wife were seriously injured and their son died at the scene.

In February 2006, Reddy's younger brother, Selvan Reddy, was shot dead at their parents' house in Shallcross; Selvan was a member of the metro police and Reddy believed that he was assassinated due to his work.

In August 2016, while sitting in his Mercedes-Benz in traffic in Pinetown, Reddy was stabbed twice in the arm in a mugging. He was hospitalised in January 2023 with illness caused by enteropathogenic E. coli.
