= Drakenstein Local Municipality elections =

The council of the Drakenstein Local Municipality consists of sixty-five members elected by mixed-member proportional representation. Thirty-three councillors are elected by first-past-the-post voting in thirty-three wards, while the remaining thirty-two are chosen from party lists so that the total number of party representatives is proportional to the number of votes received.

The Council was established in the year 2000 and is currently governed by the Democratic Alliance.

== Results ==
The following table shows the composition of the council after past elections and floor-crossing periods.

Event	ACDP	ANC	DA	EFF	FF+	ID	NNP	PA	Other	Total
2000 election	3	25	27	—	—	—	—	—	3	58
2002 floor-crossing	2	27	11	—	—	—	17	—	1	58
2004 floor-crossing	1	37	13	—	—	3	2	—	2	58
2006 election	1	26	20	—	1	10	—	—	3	61
2007 floor-crossing	1	31	20	—	1	3	—	—	4	61
2011 election	1	19	35	—	0	—	—	—	6	61
2016 election	1	15	43	2	1	—	—	0	3	65
2021 election	1	13	36	1	3	—	—	1	10	65
2026 election	1	9	36	1	4	—	—	8	6	65

== December 2000 election ==
The following table shows the results of the 2000 election.

Party	Ward			List			Total seats
Party	Votes	%	Seats	Votes	%	Seats	Total seats
Democratic Alliance	23,166	44.66	16	23,970	46.68	11	27
African National Congress	21,984	42.38	13	22,273	43.38	12	25
African Christian Democratic Party	2,344	4.52	0	2,272	4.42	3	3
Alliance for the Community	2,175	4.19	0	1,776	3.46	2	2
Independent candidates	1,577	3.04	0				0
United Democratic Movement	517	1.00	0	691	1.35	1	1
Inkatha Freedom Party	113	0.22	0	364	0.71	0	0
Total	51,876	100.00	29	51,346	100.00	29	58
Valid votes	51,876	98.57		51,346	97.98		
Invalid/blank votes	751	1.43		1,060	2.02		
Total votes	52,627	100.00		52,406	100.00		
Registered voters/turnout	93,206	56.46		93,206	56.23		

=== October 2002 floor crossing ===
In terms of the Eighth Amendment of the Constitution and the judgment of the Constitutional Court in United Democratic Movement v President of the Republic of South Africa and Others, in the period from 8–22 October 2002 councillors had the opportunity to cross the floor to a different political party without losing their seats.

In the Drakenstein council, the Democratic Alliance (DA) lost fifteen councillors to the New National Party (NNP), which had formerly been part of the DA. The DA also lost one councillor to the African Christian Democratic Party (ACDP), while the ACDP in turn lost two councillors to the African National Congress. The two councillors representing the Alliance for the Community crossed to the NNP.

Party	Seats before	Net change	Seats after
African National Congress	25	▲2	27
New National Party	–	▲17	17
Democratic Alliance	27	▼16	11
African Christian Democratic Party	3	▼1	2
United Democratic Movement	1	0	1
Alliance for the Community	2	▼2	0

=== September 2004 floor crossing ===
Another floor-crossing period occurred on 1–15 September 2004. Ten of the seventeen NNP councillors crossed to the ANC, three crossed to the Independent Democrats (ID), and two crossed to the DA. One councillor crossed from the African Christian Democratic Party to the Federation of Democrats, a new party.

Party	Seats before	Net change	Seats after
African National Congress	27	▲10	37
Democratic Alliance	11	▲2	13
Independent Democrats	–	▲3	3
New National Party	17	▼15	2
African Christian Democratic Party	2	▼1	1
United Democratic Movement	1	0	1
Federation of Democrats	–	▲1	1

=== By-elections from September 2004 to February 2006 ===
The following by-elections were held to fill vacant ward seats in the period between the floor crossing periods in September 2004 and the election in March 2006.

Date	Ward	Party of the previous councillor	Party of the newly elected councillor
11 May 2005	27	African National Congress	African National Congress (Note: Elected uncontested as no other candidates were nominated.)
12 October 2005	11	Democratic Alliance	African National Congress

== March 2006 election ==
The following table shows the results of the 2006 election.

Party	Ward			List			Total seats
Party	Votes	%	Seats	Votes	%	Seats	Total seats
African National Congress	21,062	42.41	19	20,779	41.81	7	26
Democratic Alliance	15,632	31.48	9	16,117	32.43	11	20
Independent Democrats	7,968	16.04	3	7,976	16.05	7	10
Western Cape Community	1,163	2.34	0	1,739	3.50	2	2
African Christian Democratic Party	1,152	2.32	0	1,154	2.32	1	1
Freedom Front Plus	701	1.41	0	750	1.51	1	1
Independent candidates	1,145	2.31	0				0
Federation of Democrats	437	0.88	0	331	0.67	1	1
United Independent Front	215	0.43	0	260	0.52	0	0
United Democratic Movement	100	0.20	0	374	0.75	0	0
Pan Africanist Congress of Azania	88	0.18	0	217	0.44	0	0
Total	49,663	100.00	31	49,697	100.00	30	61
Valid votes	49,663	98.77		49,697	98.78		
Invalid/blank votes	617	1.23		613	1.22		
Total votes	50,280	100.00		50,310	100.00		
Registered voters/turnout	100,552	50.00		100,552	50.03		

=== By-elections from March 2006 to August 2007 ===
The following by-elections were held to fill vacant ward seats in the period between the election in March 2006 and the floor crossing period in September 2007.

Date	Ward	Party of the previous councillor	Party of the newly elected councillor
6 December 2006	23	Democratic Alliance	Democratic Alliance
27 June 2007	27	African National Congress	Independent Democrats

=== September 2007 floor crossing ===
The final floor-crossing period occurred on 1–15 September 2007; floor-crossing was subsequently abolished in 2008 by the Fifteenth Amendment of the Constitution. In the Drakenstein council, the Independent Democrats lost five councillors to the African National Congress (ANC) and three to the new National People's Party. The single councillor from the Federation of Democrats also crossed to the ANC.

Party	Seats before	Net change	Seats after
African National Congress	25	▲6	31
Democratic Alliance	20	0	20
Independent Democrats	11	▼8	3
National People's Party	—	▲3	3
Western Cape Community	2	0	2
African Christian Democratic Party	1	0	1
Freedom Front Plus	1	0	1
Federation of Democrats	1	▼1	0

=== By-elections from September 2007 to May 2011 ===
The following by-elections were held to fill vacant ward seats in the period between the floor crossing period in September 2007 and the election in May 2011.

Date	Ward	Party of the previous councillor	Party of the newly elected councillor
10 December 2008	7	African National Congress (Note: The former councillor was elected for the Independent Democrats but had since crossed the floor to the African National Congress.)	Independent Democrats
10 December 2008	21	African National Congress	Independent (Note: The former councillor was re-elected to the ward as an independent.)
10 December 2008	26	African National Congress	Democratic Alliance
10 December 2008	28	African National Congress	Democratic Alliance
10 December 2008	30	African National Congress	Independent Democrats

== May 2011 election ==
The following table shows the results of the 2011 election.

Party	Ward			List			Total seats
Party	Votes	%	Seats	Votes	%	Seats	Total seats
Democratic Alliance	41,828	56.17	22	42,707	57.58	13	35
African National Congress	22,604	30.36	9	23,214	31.30	10	19
National People's Party	2,833	3.80	0	2,691	3.63	2	2
Congress of the People	2,304	3.09	0	2,336	3.15	2	2
Independent candidates	1,743	2.34	0				0
African Christian Democratic Party	679	0.91	0	801	1.08	1	1
South African Progressive Civic Organisation	564	0.76	0	502	0.68	1	1
People's Democratic Movement	551	0.74	0	459	0.62	1	1
United Christian Democratic Party	329	0.44	0	283	0.38	0	0
Khoisan Party	262	0.35	0	298	0.40	0	0
Democratic Christian Party	207	0.28	0	307	0.41	0	0
Freedom Front Plus	298	0.40	0	214	0.29	0	0
African Bond of Unity	146	0.20	0	120	0.16	0	0
Western Cape Community	93	0.12	0	113	0.15	0	0
National Independent Civic Organisation	22	0.03	0	124	0.17	0	0
Total	74,463	100.00	31	74,169	100.00	30	61
Valid votes	74,463	99.10		74,169	98.81		
Invalid/blank votes	674	0.90		893	1.19		
Total votes	75,137	100.00		75,062	100.00		
Registered voters/turnout	115,089	65.29		115,089	65.22		

=== By-elections from May 2011 to August 2016 ===
The following by-elections were held to fill vacant ward seats in the period between the elections in May 2011 and August 2016.

Date	Ward	Party of the previous councillor	Party of the newly elected councillor
18 September 2013	6	African National Congress	African National Congress
5 November 2014	16	African National Congress	African National Congress
11 November 2015	14	African National Congress	Democratic Alliance

== August 2016 election ==
The following table shows the results of the 2016 election.

Party	Ward			List			Total seats
Party	Votes	%	Seats	Votes	%	Seats	Total seats
Democratic Alliance	54,491	66.30	26	54,193	65.75	17	43
African National Congress	17,858	21.73	6	20,975	25.45	9	15
Economic Freedom Fighters	1,988	2.42	0	1,901	2.31	2	2
People's Democratic Movement	2,349	2.86	1	291	0.35	0	1
African Christian Democratic Party	1,180	1.44	0	1,085	1.32	1	1
Federation of Democrats	685	0.83	0	543	0.66	1	1
Independent Civic Organisation of South Africa	638	0.78	0	578	0.70	1	1
Freedom Front Plus	593	0.72	0	551	0.67	1	1
Congress of the People	597	0.73	0	503	0.61	0	0
Alliance for Democratic Freedom	526	0.64	0	467	0.57	0	0
South African Progressive Civic Organisation	461	0.56	0	410	0.50	0	0
Community Party	269	0.33	0	197	0.24	0	0
Pan Africanist Congress of Azania	168	0.20	0	227	0.28	0	0
Khoisan Revolution	189	0.23	0	170	0.21	0	0
Patriotic Alliance	124	0.15	0	174	0.21	0	0
Peoples Alliance	31	0.04	0	64	0.08	0	0
South Africa People's Party	32	0.04	0	44	0.05	0	0
Civic Independent	11	0.01	0	48	0.06	0	0
Independent candidates	0	0.00	0				0
Total	82,190	100.00	33	82,421	100.00	32	65
Valid votes	82,190	98.41		82,421	98.73		
Invalid/blank votes	1,329	1.59		1,056	1.27		
Total votes	83,519	100.00		83,477	100.00		
Registered voters/turnout	129,265	64.61		129,265	64.58		

=== By-elections from August 2016 to November 2021 ===
The following by-elections were held to fill vacant ward seats in the period between the elections in August 2016 and November 2021.

Date	Ward	Party of the previous councillor	Party of the newly elected councillor
11 November 2020 (Note: By-election was delayed due to the COVID-19 pandemic.)	3	Democratic Alliance	Democratic Alliance

== November 2021 election ==
The following table shows the results of the 2021 election.

Party	Ward			List			Total seats
Party	Votes	%	Seats	Votes	%	Seats	Total seats
Democratic Alliance	36,387	54.92	26	37,194	55.90	10	36
African National Congress	12,888	19.45	7	13,143	19.75	6	13
Good	3,768	5.69	0	3,991	6.00	4	4
Freedom Front Plus	3,465	5.23	0	3,036	4.56	3	3
Concerned Drakenstein Residents	2,922	4.41	0	2,717	4.08	3	3
African Christian Democratic Party	1,362	2.06	0	1,329	2.00	1	1
Economic Freedom Fighters	1,283	1.94	0	1,294	1.94	1	1
Patriotic Alliance	807	1.22	0	845	1.27	1	1
Independent Civic Organisation of South Africa	773	1.17	0	738	1.11	1	1
Pan Africanist Congress of Azania	585	0.88	0	562	0.84	1	1
Al Jama-ah	410	0.62	0	379	0.57	1	1
National Freedom Party	264	0.40	0	282	0.42	0	0
Cape Independence Party	229	0.35	0	244	0.37	0	0
Africa Restoration Alliance	250	0.38	0	215	0.32	0	0
People's Democratic Movement	185	0.28	0	195	0.29	0	0
Transforming Drakenstein Community Forum	159	0.24	0	159	0.24	0	0
Independent candidates	207	0.31	0				0
Cape Coloured Congress	151	0.23	0				0
Spectrum National Party	42	0.06	0	96	0.14	0	0
Community Party	63	0.10	0	60	0.09	0	0
African Covenant	50	0.08	0	61	0.09	0	0
Total	66,250	100.00	33	66,540	100.00	32	65
Valid votes	66,250	99.14		66,540	99.11		
Invalid/blank votes	573	0.86		598	0.89		
Total votes	66,823	100.00		67,138	100.00		
Registered voters/turnout	131,182	50.94		131,182	51.18		

=== By-elections from November 2021 ===
The following by-elections were held to fill vacant ward seats in the period from November 2021.

Date	Ward	Party of the previous councillor	Party of the newly elected councillor
23 November 2022	17	Democratic Alliance	Democratic Alliance
23 Jul 2025	27	Democratic Alliance	Patriotic Alliance

== 2026 election ==
The following table shows the result of the 2026 election.

Party	Ward			List			Total seats
Party	Votes	%	Seats	Votes	%	Seats	Total seats
Democratic Alliance	46,052	55.38	26	46,780	56.87	10	36
African National Congress	10,968	13.19	6	11,053	13.44	3	9
Patriotic Alliance	10,584	12.73	0	10,738	13.05	8	8
Freedom Front Plus	4,658	5.60	0	4,368	5.31	4	4
Economic Freedom Fighters	1,742	2.09	0	1,704	2.07	1	1
People's Movement for Change	1,646	1.98	0	1,596	1.94	1	1
Pan Africanist Congress of Azania	1,493	1.80	0	1,546	1.88	1	1
Independent candidates	1,629	1.96	1				1
African Christian Democratic Party	742	0.89	0	739	0.90	1	1
Good	682	0.82	0	622	0.76	1	1
South African Communist Party	650	0.78	0	546	0.66	1	1
Al Jama-ah	472	0.57	0	442	0.54	1	1
National Coloured Congress	362	0.44	0	418	0.51	0	0
Service Delivery Party	349	0.42	0	305	0.37	0	0
uMkhonto weSizwe Party	252	0.30	0	272	0.33	0	0
African Transformation Movement	118	0.14	0	323	0.39	0	0
Aboriginal Warriors 4 Economic Hope!	226	0.27	0	195	0.24	0	0
Cape Independence Party	139	0.17	0	164	0.20	0	0
People's Democratic Movement	127	0.15	0	140	0.17	0	0
Africa Restoration Alliance	99	0.12	0	107	0.13	0	0
Afrika Mayibuye Movement	90	0.11	0	84	0.10	0	0
Organic Humanity Movement	46	0.06	0	32	0.04	0	0
Truth and Solidarity Movement	20	0.02	0	38	0.05	0	0
Independent Civic Organisation of South Africa	6	0.01	0	34	0.04	0	0
Joya Web3 Community Movement	7	0.01	0	14	0.02	0	0
Total	83,159	100.00	33	82,260	100.00	32	65
Valid votes	83,159	98.87		82,260	98.73		
Invalid/blank votes	954	1.13		1,055	1.27		
Total votes	84,113	100.00		83,315	100.00		
Registered voters/turnout	146,417	57.45		146,417	56.90		
