= Schickerling =

Schickerling is a surname. Notable people with the surname include:

- JD Schickerling (born 1995), South African rugby union player
- Lisa-Maré Schickerling, South African politician
- Patrick Schickerling (born 1998), Namibian rugby union player

== See also ==
- Stickering
