= Kimberley South (House of Assembly of South Africa constituency) =

South African constituency, 1910–1994

- Kimberley Suid
- Former constituency for the South African House of Assembly
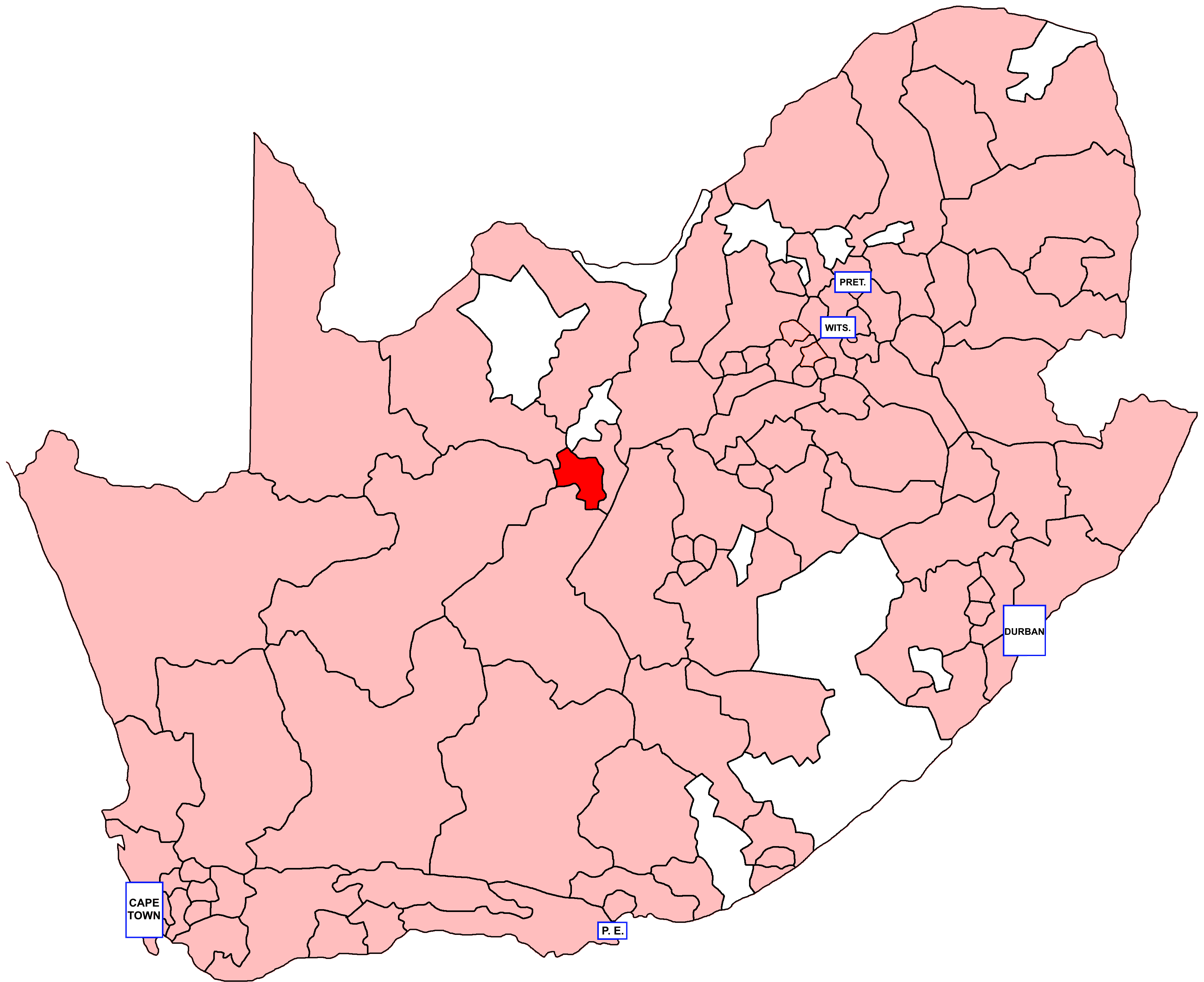
- Location of Kimberley South within South Africa (1981)
- District: Kimberley, South Africa
- Province: Cape Province

Former constituency
- Created: 1910
- Abolished: 1994
- Number of members: 1
- Replaced by: Northern Cape

Kimberley South was a constituency in the Cape Province of South Africa, which existed from 1910 to 1994. Named for the town of Kimberley, throughout its existence it elected one member to the House of Assembly.

== Members ==
Election	Parliament	Member	Party	Ref.
1989	21st South African Parliament	Keppies Niemann	NP	
