= Keppies Niemann =

South African politician (born 1936)

Member of the National Assembly
- In office May 1994 – April 2004
- Constituency: Northern Cape

Personal details
- Born: Johannes Jacobus Niemann; 19 September 1936 (age 89)
- Citizenship: South Africa
- Party: New National Party; National Party

Johannes Jacobus "Keppies" Niemann (born 19 September 1936) is a retired South African politician. He represented the National Party (NP) and New National Party (NNP) in the National Assembly from 1994 to 2004, gaining election in 1994 and 1999. He represented the Northern Cape constituency. When the NNP joined the Democratic Alliance in 2000, he was appointed as the alliance's spokesman on transport.

Niemann left Parliament after the 2004 general election. He formerly represented the NP in the apartheid-era House of Assembly for Kimberley South, and at the time of his departure in 2004 he was considered by News24 to be "the most senior member of the party in a public position".
