= Sofia Mosikatsi =

South African politician (b. 1970)

Sofia Mosikatsi MP

Member of the National Assembly of South Africa
- Incumbent
- Assumed office 14 June 2024
- Constituency: Northern Cape

Personal details
- Born: 27 February 1970 (age 56)
- Party: African National Congress
- Profession: Politician

Sofia Mosikatsi (born 27 February 1970) is a South African politician who has been a Member of the National Assembly of South Africa since 2024, representing the African National Congress. She previously served as the Executive Mayor of the John Taolo Gaetsewe District Municipality and as the provincial chairperson of the South African Local Government Association.
