= Stephen Goodson =

South African banker, author, and politician (1948–2018)

- Born: 1948
- Died: 4 August 2018 (aged 69–70)
- Education: University of Stellenbosch University of Ghent
- Occupations: Banker, author and politician
- Writing career
- Notable works: "A History of Central Banking and the Enslavement of Mankind" "Inside the South African Reserve Bank: Its Origin and Secrets Exposed" "An Illustrated Guide to Adolf Hitler and the Third Reich"
- Literary movement: History of Central Banking; South African History; Historical revisionism

Stephen Mitford Goodson (1948 - 4 August 2018) was a South African banker, author and politician who was the leader of South Africa's Abolition of Income Tax and Usury Party. He stood as a candidate for the Ubuntu Party in the 2014 General Elections. Goodson authored a total of 7 books on banking and history.

== Banking ==
He was a director of the South African Reserve Bank (2003–2012) and previously a financial consultant in Pringle Bay.

Despite his career, Goodson was also an active commentator with regards to the problems of the central banking system, writing the book A History of Central Banking and the Enslavement of Mankind, published by Black House Publishing Limited. In this book, the author narrates a brief history of finance and central banking in the Western world, from the Roman republic to the 2008 financial crisis, and maintains the existence of an international Jewish conspiracy to control nations through banking, led mainly by the Rothschild family from the 19th century onward. With reference to historical sources and events, Goodson therefore argues against what he deems to be the "scam" of the central banking system, advocating instead for the debt-free issuance of money by the governing body of the state.

== Political views ==
=== Holocaust denial and World War II revisionism ===
Goodson had stated that the Holocaust was "a huge lie" as "the principle is to extract enormous sums of money from the Germans as compensation", blaming international bankers. Goodson authored a book titled Bonaparte & Hitler Versus the International Bankers where he maintained World War II was provoked by the economic success of Germany, and he has also criticized the political actions of Jewish bankers, posting his views on like-minded websites. As a result, the South African Israel Public Affairs Committee called for the Reserve Bank to fire him for his statements, considered to be pro-Nazi.

He has been a contributing editor since 2010 of the Barnes Review, a magazine promoting Historical revisionism.

In a 2010 radio interview, Goodson stated:

they've [Jews] been expelled from over 70 countries, some of them several times. But unfortunately they have such a tight control of the media. Well, there is a small window of hope in that the Internet can provide alternative views, but even there they are trying to exercise supervision.

The National Chairman of the South African Jewish Board of Deputies, Mary Kluk, subsequently condemned Goodson's opinions:

The views purportedly disseminated by Stephen Goodson are hurtful and offensive, not only in the way they give credence to the pernicious theory that Jews fabricated the Holocaust in order to extort money from Germany but in how they serve to glorify the legacy of the hateful Nazi regime. Such views serve only to distort the historical record, falsely denying a time when ideologies of racial hatred caused untold suffering to millions and insulting the memory of the innocent victims of those times.

In April 2012, the South African Reserve Bank stated that Goodson's tenure for his position would not be renewed after it expired in July, as he would have served the maximum period of three terms of three years each. On 3 May 2012, Goodson resigned from SA Reserve Bank after he had received compensation for the balance of his term of office.

In June 2017, Goodson was one of the primary motivators of the Public Protector's Report of 19 June 2017, regarding the proposal to reform the South African Reserve Bank to abolish inflation targeting, shocking rating agencies, economists, and politicians alike.

In response to an article written about Goodson in the South African Jewish Report, which was published on 30 June 2017, Goodson explained that his Holocaust denial is predicated on the claim that in World War II memoirs written by Winston Churchill, Charles de Gaulle, Dwight D. Eisenhower and Harry S. Truman, there is no mention of millions of Jews in Europe having been annihilated. This claim is false.

On the Veterans Today website, Holocaust denier Ingrid Rimland Zundel quoted from Goodson when he wrote that Japan "had peacefully occupied Indochina, with the permission of Vichy France", but eventually was "forced into attacking America in order to maintain her prosperity and secure her existence as a sovereign state." Rimland Zundel also reposted a piece by Goodson who admired how Hitler had defeated the "banksters".

=== Other political views ===
Goodson also admired Libyan leader Muammar Gaddafi and praised his social achievements and the economic policies of the Jamahiriya. Goodson described Gaddafi as "a strict disciple of the Holy Q'uran, who abolished all forms of usury and used the Central Bank of Libya for the sole benefit of the Libyan people", further stating that the Libyan socialist model managed to create a paradise for the working class with full employment and free of inflation. According to Goodson, Gaddafi would be assassinated by NATO for this reason, especially after the creation of the gold dinar in 2010 as a proposed pan-African currency and as a substitute for the settlement of all foreign transactions. Goodson further argued that a similar reason led to the 2003 invasion of Iraq, stating that the WMD myth was actually a response to Saddam Hussein declaring that all oil payments would be made in euros in November 2000. Goodson also asserted that the central banks of Belarus, Burma, Cuba, Iran, North Korea, Sudan and Syria are the last in the world not to fall into the Rothschild banking syndicate.

== Death ==
Goodson died on 4 August 2018. According to Peter Hammond who was present at Goodson's funeral, his family fought ardently against a quick cremation in favor of a burial instead.

== Books ==
- Bonaparte & Hitler Versus the International Bankers (2004, The Barnes Review)
- An Illustrated Guide to Adolf Hitler and the Third Reich (2009, The Barnes Review)
- General Jan Christian Smuts: The Debunking of a Myth (2012, Bienedell Publishers)
- A History of Central Banking and the Enslavement of Mankind (2014, Black House Publishing)
- Inside the South African Reserve Bank Its Origins and Secrets Exposed (2014, Black House Publishing)
- Rhodesian Prime Minister Ian Smith: The Debunking of a Myth (2015, Self-published)
- Hendrik Frensch Verwoerd South Africa's Greatest Prime Minister (2016, Self-published)
- The Genocide of the Boers (2017, The Barnes Review)
