= Karen Jooste =

South African politician

Member of Parliament for Northern Cape
- In office 2014 - 2019

Personal details
- Born: Karen de Kock
- Party: Democratic Alliance

Karen Jooste née De Kock was a South African politician representing the Democratic Alliance. She served as an elected Member of Parliament representing Northern Cape in the South African National Assembly from 2014 South African general election till 2019.

== Career ==
In 2009, Jooste was fourth on the Democratic Alliance's Northern Cape provincial list for the Northern Cape Provincial Legislature election. She was elected to the legislature and became the Democratic Alliance's health spokeswoman. A year later she had become the Democratic Alliance's caucus leader in the legislature. She helped to lead a walkout on that year's provincial budget vote in protest of two African National Congress MECs accused of fraud being allowed to take part in proceedings.

In 2014, she stood for election to the South African National Assembly as 59th on the Democratic Alliance's national list. At the election, Jooste won a seat in the National Assembly. Upon election, she became an alternate member of the National Assembly's Portfolio Committee on Social Development. In 2015, she became the deputy chairperson of the Democratic Alliance's Northern Cape branch.
