= Erald Cloete =

South African politician

Erald Cloete MP

Member of the National Assembly of South Africa
- Incumbent
- Assumed office 14 June 2024
- Constituency: Northern Cape

Personal details
- Party: African National Congress
- Profession: Politician

Erald Alzano Cloete is a South African politician who was elected to the National Assembly of South Africa in the 2024 general election. He is a member of the African National Congress.

Since July 2024, Cloete has been a member of the Portfolio Committee on Police and the Portfolio Committee on Correctional Services.

Cloete is from Paulshoek in the Kamiesberg Local Municipality. By May 2024, he was serving as the provincial secretary of the African National Congress Youth League in the Northern Cape. He was elected as the provincial treasurer of the youth league in November 2024.
