= 2004 South African presidential election =

- 23 April 2004

400 votes in the National Assembly 201 votes needed to win
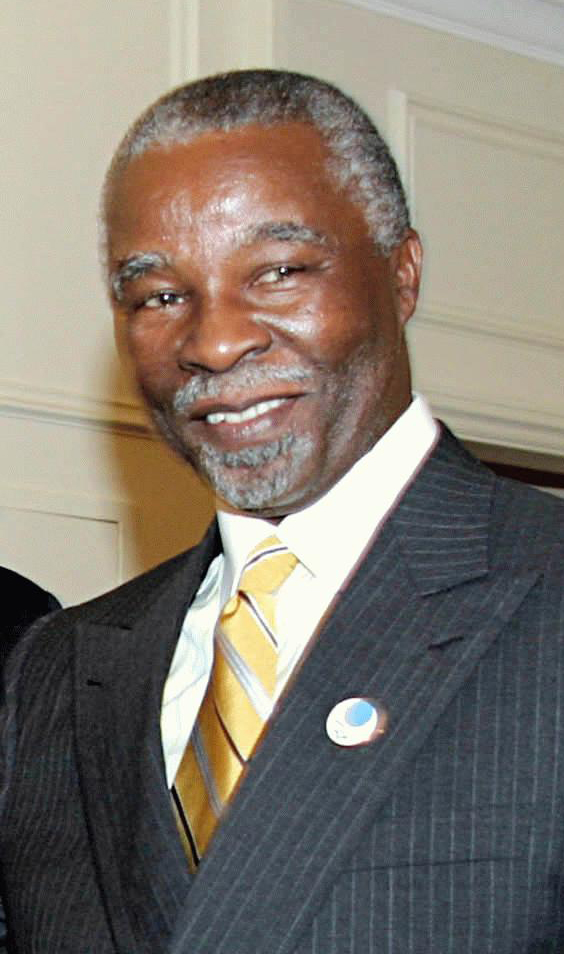
Nominee	Thabo Mbeki
Party	ANC
Electoral vote	Unopposed
President before election
Thabo Mbeki
ANC
Elected President
Thabo Mbeki
ANC

An indirect presidential election took place in South Africa on 23 April 2004. The came after the African National Congress (ANC) won a supermajority of 69.69% of the vote in the general election on 14 April 2004. This result won them 279 out of the 400 seats in the national assembly. As required by Chapter 5, Section 86 of the 1996 Constitution of South Africa, a president must be elected by the national assembly within thirty days of the general election.
