= Nelville van Wyk =

South African politician

Member of the National Assembly
- In office June 1999 – April 2004
- Constituency: Northern Cape

Personal details
- Born: 15 December 1968 (age 57)
- Citizenship: South Africa
- Party: African National Congress

Nelville van Wyk (born 15 December 1968) is a South African politician who represented the African National Congress (ANC) in the National Assembly from 1999 to 2004, gaining election in 1999. He was one of three ANC representatives in the Northern Cape constituency and served only a single term.
