= Masizole Mnqasela =

South African politician

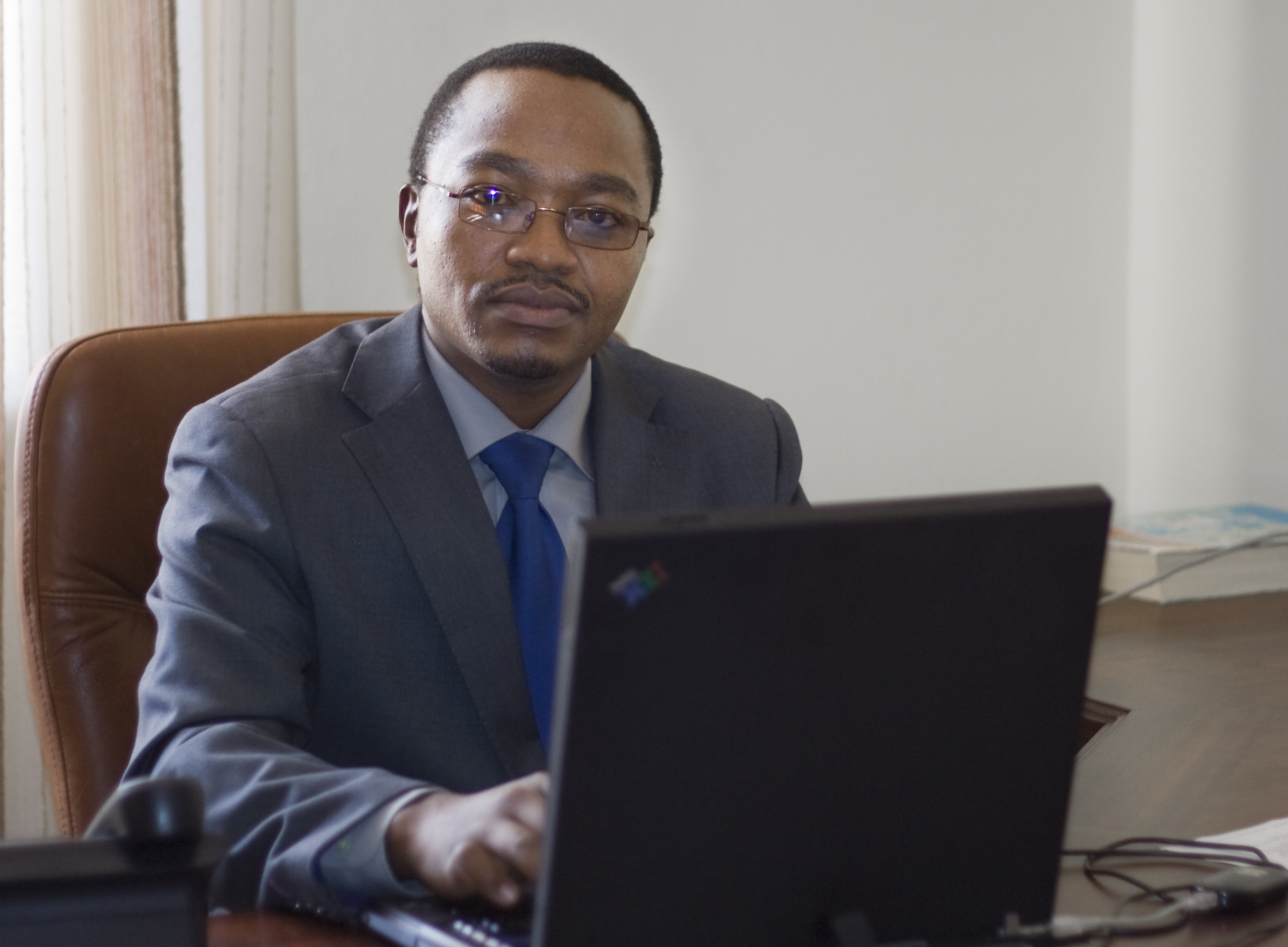

Speaker of the Western Cape Provincial Parliament
- In office 22 May 2019 – 28 November 2022
- Preceded by: Sharna Fernandez
- Succeeded by: Daylin Mitchell

Shadow Deputy Minister of Home Affairs
- In office 14 May 2009 – 5 June 2014
- Preceded by: Unknown
- Succeeded by: Archie Figlan

Member of the National Assembly
- In office 6 May 2009 – 6 May 2014

Member of the Western Cape Provincial Parliament
- In office 21 May 2014 – 28 November 2022

Personal details
- Born: 1 March 1981 (age 45) Nqadu Village, Qolombane, Tsolo, Cape Province, South Africa
- Party: Alliance of Citizens for Change (2023–present)
- Other political affiliations: Democratic Alliance (Until 2022)

Masizole Mnqasela (born 1 March 1981) is a South African politician, currently the founding leader of the Alliance of Citizens for Change. He formerly served as the 7th Speaker of the Western Cape Provincial Parliament. He was previously a Member of Parliament with the Democratic Alliance from 2009 to 2014, the Shadow Minister of Home Affairs, and the country's third youngest parliamentarian after the African National Congress's Mduduzi Manana, and the Congress of the People's Luzelle Adams.

== Political career ==
Mnqasela was initially an African National Congress branch organiser in the executive committee of Ward 96. He was General Secretary of the Ward 96 Development Forum in Makhaza, Khayelitsha from 2001 to 2002.

He introduced the Democratic Alliance to the ANC's bloated Khayelitsha Development Forum (KDF), which refused membership to the DA for quite some time. Mnqasela served as a member of its executive committee between 2004 and 2007.

=== Constituency Chairperson ===
From 2003 to 2004, he served as the DA Branch Chairperson of Ward 96 in the City of Cape Town.

In 2004, he participated in a world forum of young people from 25 world countries, which took place in Germany on managing world conflicts, the protection of human rights and advancing liberal principles in the people of the world.

Mnqasela served as a councillor in the City of Cape Town between November 2003 and April 2009.

In 2006, Mnqasela worked together with Helen Zille in negotiating with the PAC to join a political pact, that saw the Democratic Alliance winning the City of Cape Town through a multi-party coalition system.

Between 2006 and 2009, he had served as an executive councillor and the Chairperson of both Sub-Council 6 & 10

Mnqasela has served as a member of the DA's Provincial Council since 2004.

=== DA Federal Council ===
Mnqasela had been a member of the DA Federal Council from 2012 to 2014.

=== National Parliament ===
He served as a member of Parliament in the Republic of South Africa from 2009 to 2014. In the same time, he was the DA Deputy Shadow Minister on Home Affairs.

=== Provincial Parliament ===
Mnqasela was sworn in as a Member of the Western Cape Provincial Parliament on 21 May 2014. For the Fifth Provincial Parliament, he was the Chairperson of the Standing Committee on Local Government.

On 22 May 2019, he was elected Speaker of the Western Cape Provincial Parliament.

On 28 November 2022, the DA terminated his party membership after he made disparaging comments against the party. He faces allegations of corruption and irregularities.

=== ACC formation ===
On 15 July 2023, Mnqasela announced the formation of the Alliance of Citizens for Change at the Rocklands Civic Centre.

The party failed to win any seats in the 2024 South African general election.
