= Makhosi Khoza =

South African politician

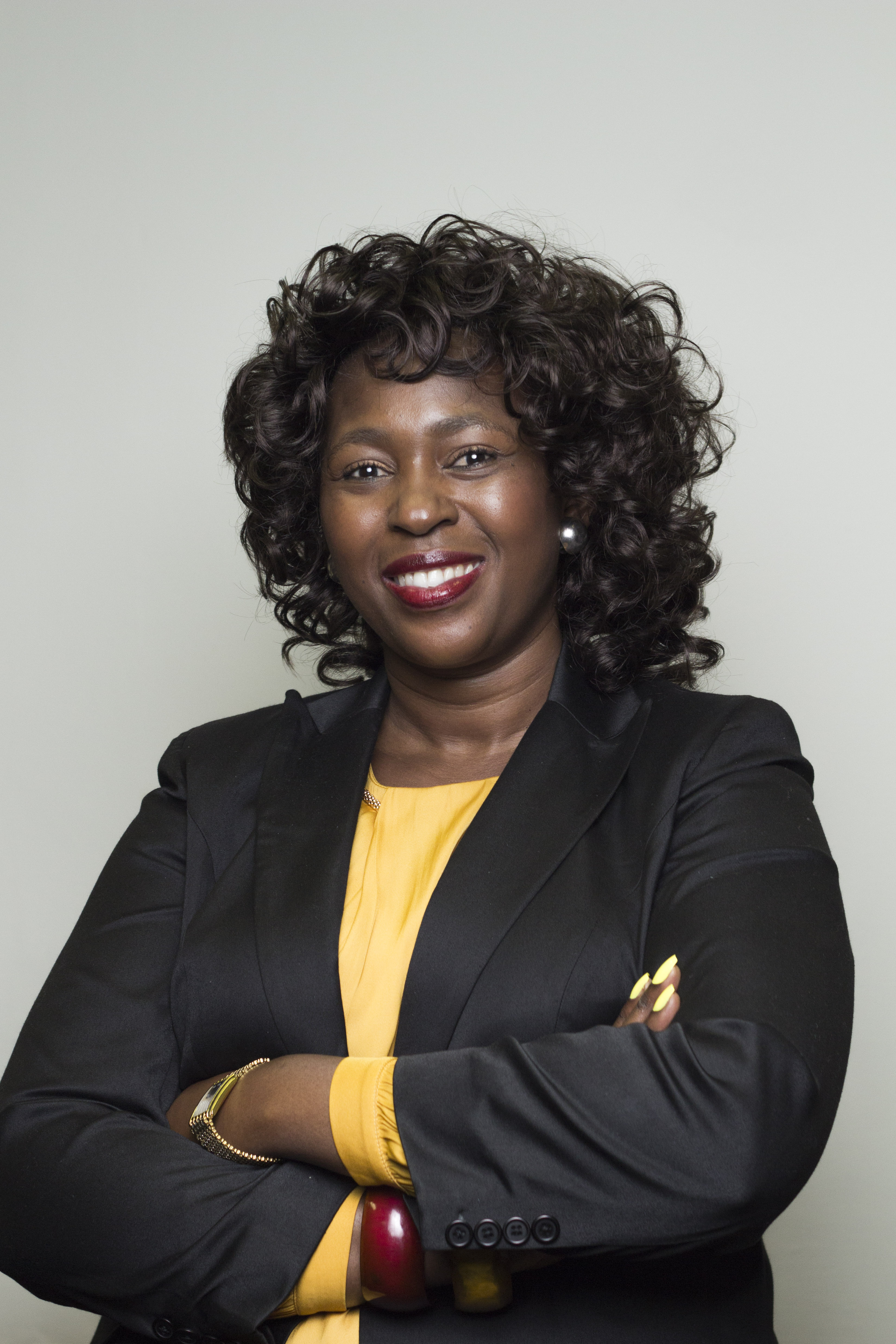

Deputy President of the Abantu Batho Congress
- Incumbent
- Assumed office 13 February 2024
- President: Philani Mavundla

Chairperson of the eThekwini Metropolitan Municipal Public Accounts Commission
- In office 24 December 2021 – 23 March 2022
- Succeeded by: Musa Kubheka

Member of the eThekwini City Council
- In office November 2021 – March 2022
- Succeeded by: Busi Radebe

Provincial Chairperson of ActionSA in KwaZulu-Natal
- In office 29 August 2020 – 24 December 2021
- President: Herman Mashaba
- Preceded by: Position established
- Succeeded by: Musa Kubheka

Leader of the African Democratic Change
- In office 1 December 2017 – 22 April 2018
- Preceded by: Position established
- Succeeded by: Moses Mayekiso

Chairperson of the Public Service and Administration Committee of the National Assembly of South Africa
- In office 17 February 2017 – 4 September 2017
- Succeeded by: Joe Maswanganyi

Member of the National Assembly of South Africa
- In office 21 May 2014 – 21 September 2017
- Constituency: KwaZulu-Natal

Member of the KwaZulu-Natal Legislature
- In office April 1994 – May 2014

Personal details
- Born: Makhosi Busisiwe Khoza; 1970 (age 55–56) Pietermaritzburg, Natal, South Africa (now KwaZulu-Natal)
- Citizenship: South Africa
- Party: Abantu Batho Congress (2024-present)
- Other political affiliations: Independent (2022-2024); ActionSA (2020–2022); African Democratic Change (2017–2018); African National Congress (until 2017)
- Spouse(s): Ntela Sikhosana (until death; 1998)
- Education: University of the Witwatersrand (PhD); University of Natal (MSSc)
- Occupation: Politician; legislator; public speaker; activist
- Known for: Founder of the African Democratic Change (2017)

Makhosi Busisiwe Khoza is a South African politician who was the ActionSA candidate for Mayor of eThekwini in the 2021 municipal elections. She was previously an ANC Member of Parliament (MP) who served as chairperson of the Portfolio Committee on Public Service and Administration and on the Portfolio Committee on Economic Development. She became known for calling on then president Jacob Zuma to step down. In 1996, she was appointed as the deputy mayor of the Pietermaritzburg Local Municipality, at the age of 26.

== Education ==
She holds a PhD in Public Administration and a Master's Degree in Social Science (Policy and Developmental Studies) from the University of Witwatersrand. She is also a fellow at the Aspen Global Leadership Institute.

== Political career ==
Having experience within both public and private sectors, Khoza served in the Portfolio Committee on Economic Development as a Member of Parliament from 4 to 21 September 2017. She was also a member of the Ad-hoc Committee on the Appointment of the Public Protector On 21 September 2017, Khoza announced her resignation from the ANC to join the effort against corruption in South Africa.

On 1 December 2017, Khoza announced that she would launch a new political party, named African Democratic Change to be made of up of 16 small political groups. Khoza resigned from the African Democratic Change on 22 April 2018.

After being unveiled as ActionSA's mayoral candidate for the eThekwini Metropolitan Municipality in 2021, in which she failed to be elected, she was elected Chairperson of the Municipal Public Accounts Committee (MPAC), the municipal equivalent of the Standing Committee on Public Accounts. At the time, ActionSA President Herman Mashaba was quoted as saying "We wish Dr Khoza nothing but the best in her work in eThekwini but are comforted by the notion that she remains an active and loyal leader within our ranks."

In March 2022, Dr Khoza's ActionSA membership was terminated, citing the outcome of an investigation by the party's Ethics and Disciplinary Committee.

In February 2024, Dr Khoza joined the Abantu Batho Congress as its deputy president.

== Ubantu isiZulu Alphabetical language ==
Khoza is the creator of an alphabetical language ordering system that helps in the learning of the Zulu language. Khoza published a textbook that works to build a solid foundation of South African linguistic identity through the presenting of a new sound-unit sequencing, Ubantu isiZulu Alphabetical Logic Order (UZALO). Her textbook acts as a guide and practical bilingual tool that could be utilized into various other Bantu languages.
