= Keep It Straight and Simple Party =

Political party in South Africa

- Abbreviation: KISS Party
- Leader: Claire C. Gaisford
- Founded: February 1994
- Headquarters: Heidelberg, Gauteng
- Ideology: Classical liberalism
- Political position: Centre-right

Website
- www.kissparty.co.za

The Keep It Straight and Simple Party (known simply as the KISS Party) was a minor South African classical liberal political party. It was founded by Claire C. Gaisford in 1994, when the first nonracial democratic elections were held in South Africa after the end of Apartheid and white minority rule. After being dormant in the 1999 parliamentary elections, the party resurfaced in the April 14, 2004 elections. It has been inactive since the 2014 election.

== Electoral performance ==
The party consistently placed very low in elections.

Election	Votes	%	Seats
2014	4,294	0.02	-
2009	5,440	0.03	-
2004	6,514	0.04	-
1994	5,916	0.03	-

== See also ==
- List of political parties in South Africa
