= Pro-death Penalty Party (South Africa) =

Pro-Death Penalty Party
- Founded: 2004

The Pro-Death Penalty Party was a minor South African political party formed around the single issue of restoring the death penalty, abolished in South Africa in 1995.

The party contested for the Gauteng legislature in the 2004 elections, earning 0.05% of the vote and failing to win a seat.

The party did not contest any further elections.

== Provincial elections ==
Election	Votes	%	Seats
2004	1,825	0.05%	0
