= Albanian Business Party =

Political party in Albania

- Leader: Luan Shazivari
- Founded: 1996

Albanian Business Party (in Albanian: Partia e Biznesit Shqiptar) is a political party in Albania. The party was founded in 1996. It is led by Luan Shazivari.

The party is a member of the Democratic Movement for Integration.
