= African Democratic Change =

Political party from South Africa

- Abbreviation: ADeC
- Leader: Visvin Reddy
- Chairperson: Thomas Mshumpela
- Secretary-General: Nathaniel D. Bricknell
- Spokesperson: Feziwe Ndwayana
- National Organiser: Mzwonke Mayekiso
- Communications Committee Chairperson: Anele Kunene
- Founder: Makhosi Khoza
- Founded: 1 December 2017; 8 years ago
- Split from: African National Congress
- Colors: Orange
- National Assembly: 0 / 400
- NCOP: 0 / 90
- Provincial Legislatures: 0 / 430

Website
- www.adec.org.za

African Democratic Change (ADeC) is a South African political party. It was launched on 1 December 2017 by former African National Congress Member of Parliament, Makhosi Khoza. Khoza resigned from the party in April 2018. The party is currently led by Visvin Reddy.

== Formation ==
Makhosi Khoza resigned as an African National Congress Member of Parliament on 21 September 2017 to join the effort against corruption in South Africa. Her resignation came after months of her criticizing ANC President Jacob Zuma and calling for him to step down. After the announcement, it became speculative that Khoza would form a new political party. Initial reports in November 2017, suggested that Khoza would name her new political party "Change". The African Democratic Change (ADeC) was launched on 1 December 2017. Khoza was adamant that her new party would not collapse.

After the launch, the African National Congress criticized Khoza for making the ADeC logo look similar to the African National Congress logo. Khoza dismissed these claims.

In April 2018, four months after the launch of the party, Khoza stepped down as party leader. Party chairperson, Moses Mayekiso, succeeded her as leader.

== Coalition with MK ==
In January 2024, Reddy announced that after meeting former president Jacob Zuma, his party would form a coalition with Zuma's uMkhonto we Sizwe (MK) party.

On 5 March 2024, Reddy threatened violence if the MK party was not allowed to contest the 2024 general elections.

Reddy appears ninth on MK's national list for the 2024 elections.

== Election results ==
The party contested the 2019 South African general election on the national and provincial ballot, and entered into a partnership with the Dagga Party.

It failed to win any seats.

The party contested the 2021 South African municipal elections, again failing to win any seats. In October 2021, it suspended one of its candidates, Wayne Solomon, after a voice note surfaced of him discussing sexual acts with minor girls, aged six, nine and sixteen.

=== National elections ===
Election	Total votes	Share of vote	Seats	+/–	Government
2019	6,499	0.04%	0 / 400	–	extraparliamentary

=== Provincial elections ===
Election	Eastern Cape		Free State		Gauteng		Kwazulu-Natal		Limpopo		Mpumalanga		North-West		Northern Cape		Western Cape	
Election	%	Seats	%	Seats	%	Seats	%	Seats	%	Seats	%	Seats	%	Seats	%	Seats	%	Seats
2019	-	-	0.38%	0/30	0.02%	0/73	-	-	-	-	-	-	-	-	-	-	-	-

=== Municipal elections ===
Election	Votes	%
2021	14,141	0.05%
