= Lisa-Maré Schickerling =

South African politician

Member of the National Assembly of South Africa
- Incumbent
- Assumed office 14 June 2024
- Constituency: Northern Cape

Personal details
- Political party: Democratic Alliance

Lisa-Maré Schickerling is a South African politician and a Member of Parliament (MP) for the Democratic Alliance (DA).

She was elected to the National Assembly of South Africa in the 2024 South African general election, where she was 50th on the national party list.

She is her party's police spokesperson on police matters. In Parliament she is a member of the portfolio committee on police.

== See also ==
- List of National Assembly members of the 28th Parliament of South Africa
