= Khoisan Aboriginal and Others Movement =

Political party in South Africa

The Khoisan Aboriginal and Others Movement was a political party in South Africa. It was the first Khoisan party in South Africa and was launched in December 2008. It was led by Rodney January and sought to improve the livelihood of South Africa's San people.
