= South African Business Party =

Former political party in South Africa

The South African Business Party (SABP) is a former political party in South Africa. In 2012, due to lack of funding, the group ceased to be a political party and transformed into an NGO named "South African People's Organization". It was deregistered as a political party by the South African government in 2014. Its goal is to assist people in planning their business, and advises and guides business in regard to exporting, tax reduction, job creation, and other business-oriented interests.
