= Abolition of Income Tax and Usury Party =

- Leader: Stephen Goodson
- Founded: 1994
- Headquarters: Pringle Bay
- Ideology: Anti-Tax
- Slogan: Progress and Prosperity

Website
- www.aitup.org.za

The Abolition of Income Tax and Usury Party was a South African political party founded in 1994.

== Objectives ==
Its principal objective was monetary reform, which it wished to achieve by the establishment of a state bank, which would issue all South Africans credit free of interest. This would, the party believed, enable the abolition of personal income tax, a reduction in value added tax (15%) and a substantial expansion of social upliftment programmes.

Commercial banks and private banks, which currently provide the nation's money supply at interest by means of fractional reserves, would become full reserve banks. The party has, unsuccessfully, contested one national and three local government elections.

== Election results ==
=== National elections ===
Election	Votes	%	Seats
1999	10,611	0.07	0

== Stephen Goodson ==
The party's former leader, Stephen Goodson, who has since co-founded the Ubuntu Party, is a former director of the South African Reserve Bank (2003–12). Goodson has stated that the Holocaust was “a huge lie” as "the principle is to extract enormous sums of money from the Germans as compensation", blaming international bankers. Goodson authored a book titled Bonaparte & Hitler Versus the International Bankers where he maintained World War II was provoked by the economic success of Germany, and he has also criticised the political actions of Jewish bankers which were posted on antisemitic websites. As a result, the South African Israel Public Affairs Committee called for the Reserve Bank to fire him for his pro-Nazi statements.
