= Alliance of Citizens for Change =

South African political party

- Abbreviation: ACC
- Leader: Masizole Mnqasela
- Founder: Masizole Mnqasela
- Founded: 15 July 2023; 2 years ago
- Split from: Democratic Alliance
- Slogan: The change we all need
- National Assembly seats: 0 / 400
- Provincial Legislatures: 0 / 430

Website
- accforchange.org.za

The Alliance of Citizens for Change (ACC) is a South African political party founded by expelled Democratic Alliance member and former speaker of the Western Cape Provincial Parliament, Masizole Mnqasela, in July 2023.

== Formation ==
Masizole Mnqasela was a member of the Democratic Alliance for more than two decades and served in various positions, including as the Speaker of the Western Cape Provincial Parliament. He was expelled from the DA in November 2022 for making disparaging remarks about the party amid him facing allegations of fraud. In June 2023, he announced that he was joining a new civil movement.

On 15 July 2023, Mnqasela announced the formation of the Alliance of Citizens for Change at the Rocklands Civic Centre in Mitchells Plain.

In August 2023, the councillor for ward 7 of the Swartland Local Municipality, Basil Stanley, joined the party.

== Policies ==
The party focuses on social justice, and is in favour of the restoration of the death penalty.

== Election results ==
=== National Assembly elections ===
Election	Party leader	Total votes	Share of vote	Seats	+/–	Government
2024	Masizole Mnqasela	9,336	0.06% (Note: From 2024, seats in the National Assembly are determined by a combination of the national ballot, and the nine regional ballots. Only the national ballot figures are shown here.)	0 / 400	New	Extra-parliamentary

=== Provincial elections ===
Election	Eastern Cape		Free State		Gauteng		Kwazulu-Natal		Limpopo		Mpumalanga		North-West		Northern Cape		Western Cape	
Election	%	Seats	%	Seats	%	Seats	%	Seats	%	Seats	%	Seats	%	Seats	%	Seats	%	Seats
2024	0.08	0/73			0.04	0/80												
