= Socialist Party of Azania =

Political party in South Africa

- President: Tiyani Lybon Mabasa
- Secretary-General: Ashraf Jooma
- Founded: 21 March 1998
- Split from: Azanian People's Organisation
- Headquarters: 4–16 Renaissance Centre, Gandhi Square, Johannesburg 2000
- Ideology: Black Consciousness; Anti-imperialism; African nationalism Trotskyism
- Political position: Far-left
- International affiliation: International Liaison Committee for a Workers' International
- Colors: Yellow, black and red

Website
- http://www.sopa.org.za/

The Socialist Party of Azania (SOPA) was a political party in South Africa adhering to Black Consciousness theory. In the 2004 general elections, it received 0.1% of the vote and no legislatorial seats at either the national or provincial levels.

== Ideology ==
SOPA's ideological framework was a blend of Bikoist Black Consciousness and Marxism-Leninism. Following from this framework, SOPA argues that the end of apartheid in the 1990s did not truly liberate Black people in South Africa (which the party refers to as Azania), but that instead the post-apartheid South African state – led by the African National Congress (ANC) – has allowed the continuing cultural, social and economic dominance of white South Africans. This, the party argued, was due to the ANC having sold out to white capital. In the Bikoist terminology used by the party, those in power through the ANC can be said to be "non-whites" as, in Biko's words their "aspiration is whiteness" and only their "pigmentation makes attainment of this impossible", as opposed to Blacks who "are those who can manage to hold their heads high in defiance rather than willingly surrender their souls to the white man". The party therefore calls for Black political leadership which stands in solidarity with the Black population of the country.

It was SOPA's perspective that to liberate the poorest of the black majority of population from despair, the working class must lead a proletarian revolution which will abolish the system based upon the private ownership of fundamental means of production, and result in the redistribution of land and nationalisation of basic industries. This plan would, according to theory, reverse the detrimental economic legacy of apartheid and colonialism, which SOPA claims has left black South Africans inherently disadvantaged.

In 1998, leading SOPA figures participated in an international Tribunal on Africa, "to judge those responsible for the murderous course imposed on the workers and peoples of Africa." The Tribunal held that economic policies affecting Africa – as formulated by such international institutions as the World Bank, World Trade Organization, and International Monetary Fund, and the co-operation of what SOPA sees as neocolonial governments like that of the African National Congress – have led to disastrous living conditions for the majority of Africans. SOPA regards such policies and practices as imperialism on behalf of multinational corporations.

== Negotiations with other parties ==
The party had regular negotiations with AZAPO aimed at merging the two parties but these broke down in 2004, 2007 and again in 2013.

In the lead-up to the 2014 election, the party announced that it had agreed working relations with the Economic Freedom Fighters (EFF), and that its members would form part of the EFF's candidate list.

== Election results ==
=== National elections ===
Election	Votes	%	Seats
1999	9,062	0.06%	0
2004	14,853	0.10%	0

=== Provincial elections ===
Election	Eastern Cape		Free State		Gauteng		Kwazulu-Natal		Limpopo		Mpumalanga		North-West		Northern Cape		Western Cape	
Election	%	Seats	%	Seats	%	Seats	%	Seats	%	Seats	%	Seats	%	Seats	%	Seats	%	Seats
1999	-	0/63	0.11%	0/30	0.05%	0/73	0.12%	0/80	-	0/49	-	0/30	-	0/33	-	0/30	-	0/42
2004	0.15%	0/63	-	0/30	0.09%	0/73	0.18%	0/80	-	0/49	0.13%	0/30	-	0/33	-	0/30	-	0/42

== Electoral performance and political affiliation ==
In the 2004 elections, SOPA received 0.1% of the vote. The party was affiliated with the International Liaison Committee for a Workers' International. Although party members include socialists of different stripes, some of its most influential members were Trotskyists, and they comprised the Azanian Section of the reproclaimed Fourth International.

== See also ==
- Black Consciousness Movement
- African Independence Movements: South Africa
- List of Trotskyist internationals
