= Christen Party/Christian Party =

Political party in South Africa

The Christen Party/Christian Party (CP) was a Protestant Christian democratic party, in South Africa, formed in October 2005. The party membership was open to everyone who accepted Jesus Christ as Saviour and the Bible as the inerrant word of God. The CP declared in its founding statement: The Christian Party seeks to glorify God through our political participation in South Africa in a manner which will educate, inform and promote the Biblical Worldview and apply the Lordship of Jesus Christ to all areas and aspects of our daily life. The vision of the CP was: South Africa governed by Christian Government in accordance with God's Word. The CP was registered with the Independent Electoral Commission Of South Africa, but has since been deregistered.

The CP was formed after Louis JB Marneweck a Member of the Provincial Legislature for the Freedom Front Plus, in Mpumalanga Province, broke away to form the CP. Louis J B Marneweck was also the provincial leader of the Freedom Front Plus in Mpumalanga and a member of the FF+ National Federal Council.

It was represented with one seat in the Mpumalanga Provincial Legislature from 2005 to 2009. Its representative, Louis J B Marneweck, was the Chairperson of the Select Committee on Public Accounts.
