= Federation of Democrats (South Africa) =

Defunct South African political party

The Federation of Democrats was a South African political party formed by Louis Green, after he crossed the floor from the African Christian Democratic Party, in September 2005.

The party was created by Green, Rhoda Southgate and Kevin Southgate.

In 2007, the party joined four other parties to create the Christian Democratic Alliance (South Africa).
