= Peace and Justice Congress =

Political party in South Africa

The Peace and Justice Congress (PJC) is a South African political party that contested the South African 2004 general election, as well as in the Free State and Western Cape provinces for the South African 2009 provincial elections.

== Election results ==
=== National elections ===
Election	Votes	%	Seats
2004	15,187	0.10	0

=== Provincial elections ===
Election	Eastern Cape		Free State		Gauteng		Kwazulu-Natal		Limpopo		Mpumalanga		North-West		Northern Cape		Western Cape	
Election	%	Seats	%	Seats	%	Seats	%	Seats	%	Seats	%	Seats	%	Seats	%	Seats	%	Seats
2004	-	0/63	-	0/30	0.09%	0/73	-	0/80	-	0/49	-	0/30	-	0/33	-	0/30	0.21%	0/42
2009	-	0/63	0.04%	0/30	-	0/73	-	0/80	-	0/49	-	0/30	-	0/33	-	0/30	0.03%	0/42

== See also ==
- Capital punishment
