= Christian Democratic Party (South Africa) =

Political party in South Africa

- Leader: Rev. Theunis Botha
- Founded: 9 September 1999
- Headquarters: Menlyn, Pretoria, South Africa
- Ideology: Christian democracy
- Political position: Centre-right to right-wing

Party flag

Website
- www.cdp.org.za/

The Christian Democratic Party (CDP) is a Christian social conservative party in South Africa. The party was registered on 9 September 1999 and was formally launched a year later.

The CDP's support was mainly in Gauteng, and its alliance partner in Mpumalanga was the Christen Party/Christian Party.

== Leadership structure ==
The party's leadership structure is the Federal Leadership Council, which consisted of the party leader, two co-leaders, and provincial leaders.

=== Party leader ===
The leader of the CDP is Theunis Botha, who had been a Christian cleric since 1970. He is the founder of the Christian Drama Workshop (CDW) and the Christian Fellowship of Ministries (CFM). He had been involved in politics since 1994, as councillor in the Pretoria City Council and member of the provincial legislator (MPL) for Gauteng. Botha was opposed to what he sees as secular/humanist and socialist/liberal factions within the African National Congress and the Democratic Alliance.

=== Co-Federal Leader ===
The CDP's co-Federal Leader is Richard Botha. He had been involved in politics since 2000 when he joined the CDP. He served on various structures and became the regional Chairperson before becoming co-Federal Leader. He has served as a councillor on the Tshwane Metro Council in 2009. He serves on the Finance, City Planning and Corporate Shared Services committees.

== Election results ==
=== National elections ===
Election	Total votes	Share of vote	Seats	+/–	Government
2004	17,619	0.11	0 / 400	–	extraparliamentary

It did not contest the 2009 election, instead supporting the formation of a new party, the Christian Democratic Alliance (CDA), along with a number of other parties. The CDA failed to win a seat.

It did not contest the 2014 election.
