= Ubuntu Party =

Political party in South Africa

- Leader: Michael Tellinger
- Founded: 2012
- Dissolved: c. 2020
- Ideology: Ubuntu

Website
- www.ubuntuparty.org.za

The Ubuntu Party was a minor South African political party founded in 2012 by author and songwriter Michael Tellinger. Based on the principles of Ubuntu Contributionism, the party espouses Tellinger's pseudolegal ideas.

The party aimed to introduce 100% employment by closing down the South African Reserve Bank and replacing it with a people's bank that will grant interest-free home-loans, fund massive public works, and provide free electricity as Eskom, the state-owned electricity utility, is owned by the people of South Africa. They also plan to eliminate the necessity for government altogether.

The party took part in the 2014 General Election at a national level. Second on their list of candidates was Stephen Goodson, leader of the Abolition of Income Tax and Usury Party, a former director of the South African Reserve Bank and controversial for his holocaust denial.

In a 2020 social media post, the party noted it was no longer active in politics and had not contested an election since 2016.

== National elections ==
Election	Votes	%	Seats
2014	8,234	0.04%	0

=== Municipal elections ===
Election	Votes	%
2016	2,752	0.01%
