= Christian Democratic Alliance (South Africa) =

Minor political party in South Africa

The Christian Democratic Alliance was a minor political party in South Africa, an alliance of five Christian Democratic parties: the Alliance for Community Transformation, the Christian Democratic Party, the Federation of Democrats, the New Labour Party, and the Party vir Christelike Politiek (Party for Christian Politics). These parties continued as independent entities until the 2009 election.

The party failed to win any seats in the 2009 general election and subsequently dissolved itself.

== Election results ==
Election	Votes	%	Seats
2009	11,638	0.07	-
