= 2004 South African general election =

- 14 April 2004

All 400 seats in the National Assembly 201 seats needed for a majority
- Registered: 20,674,926
- Turnout: 76.70% (▼12.60pp)
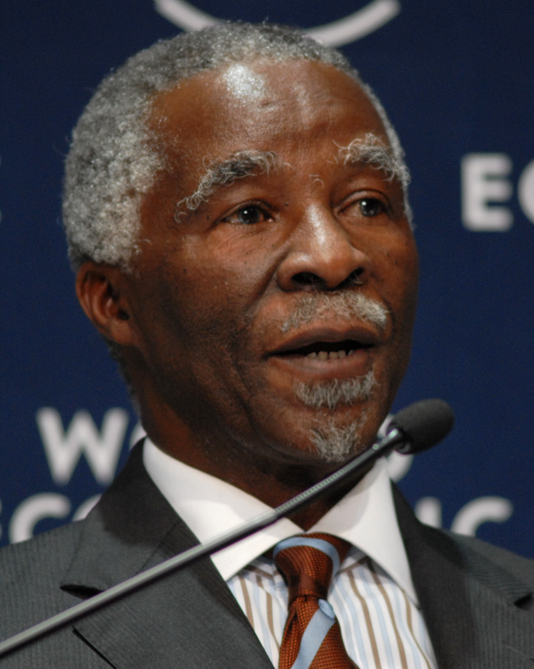

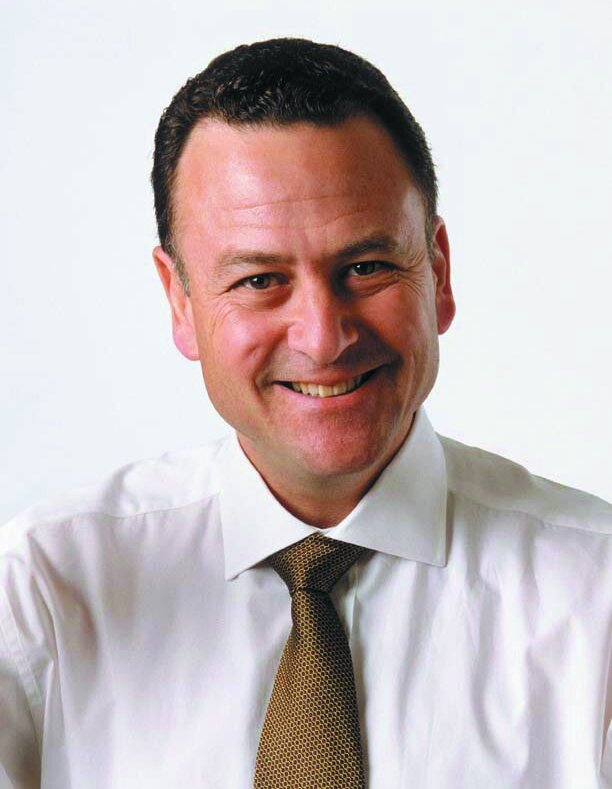

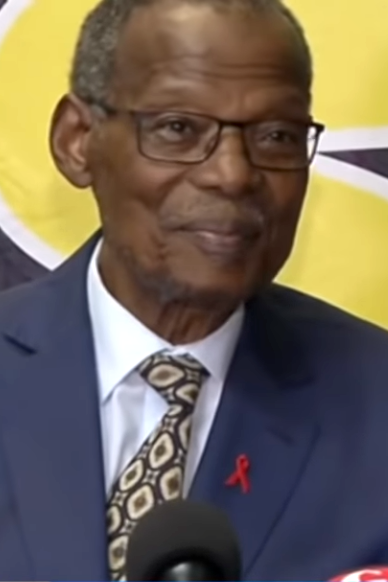

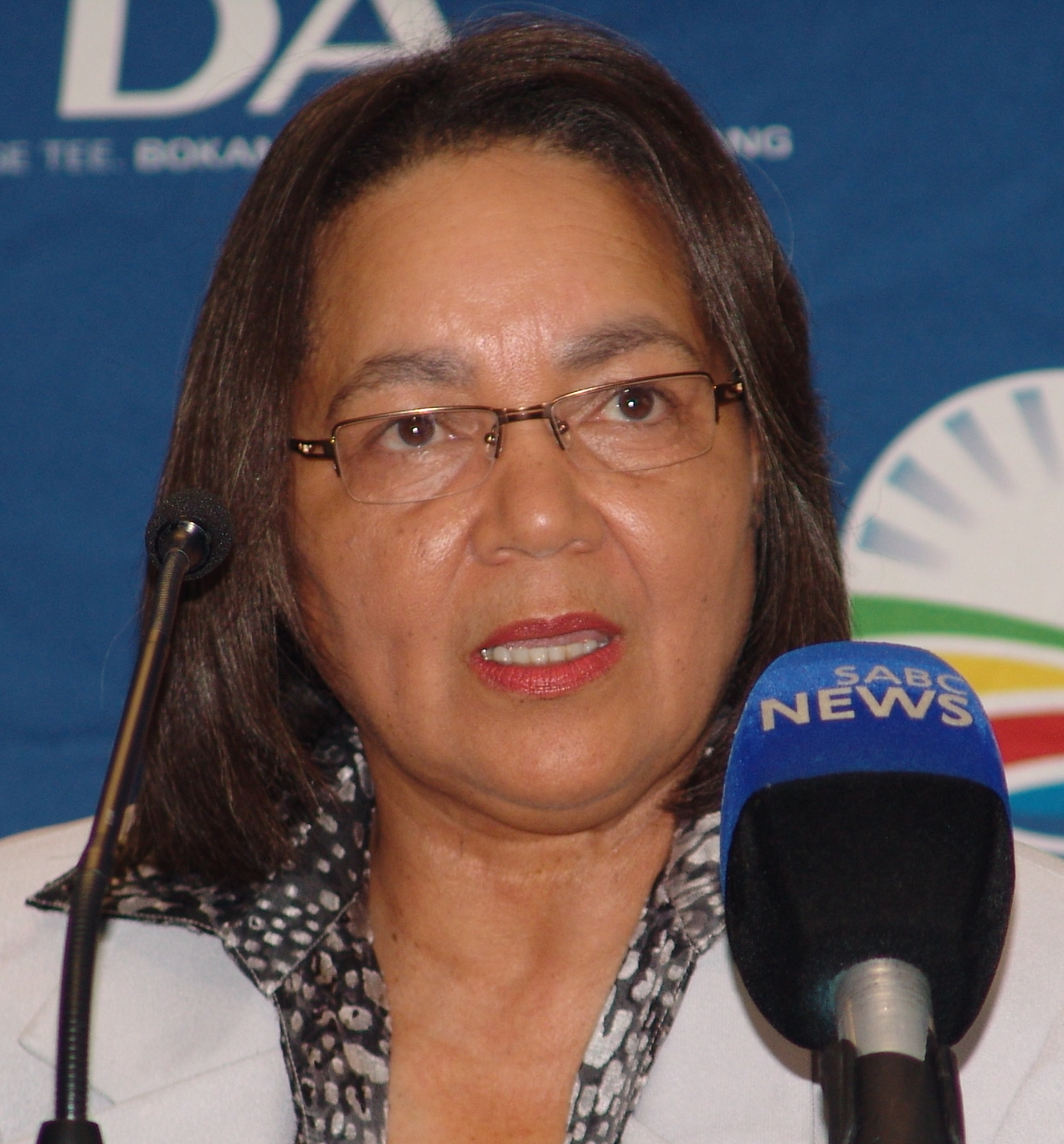

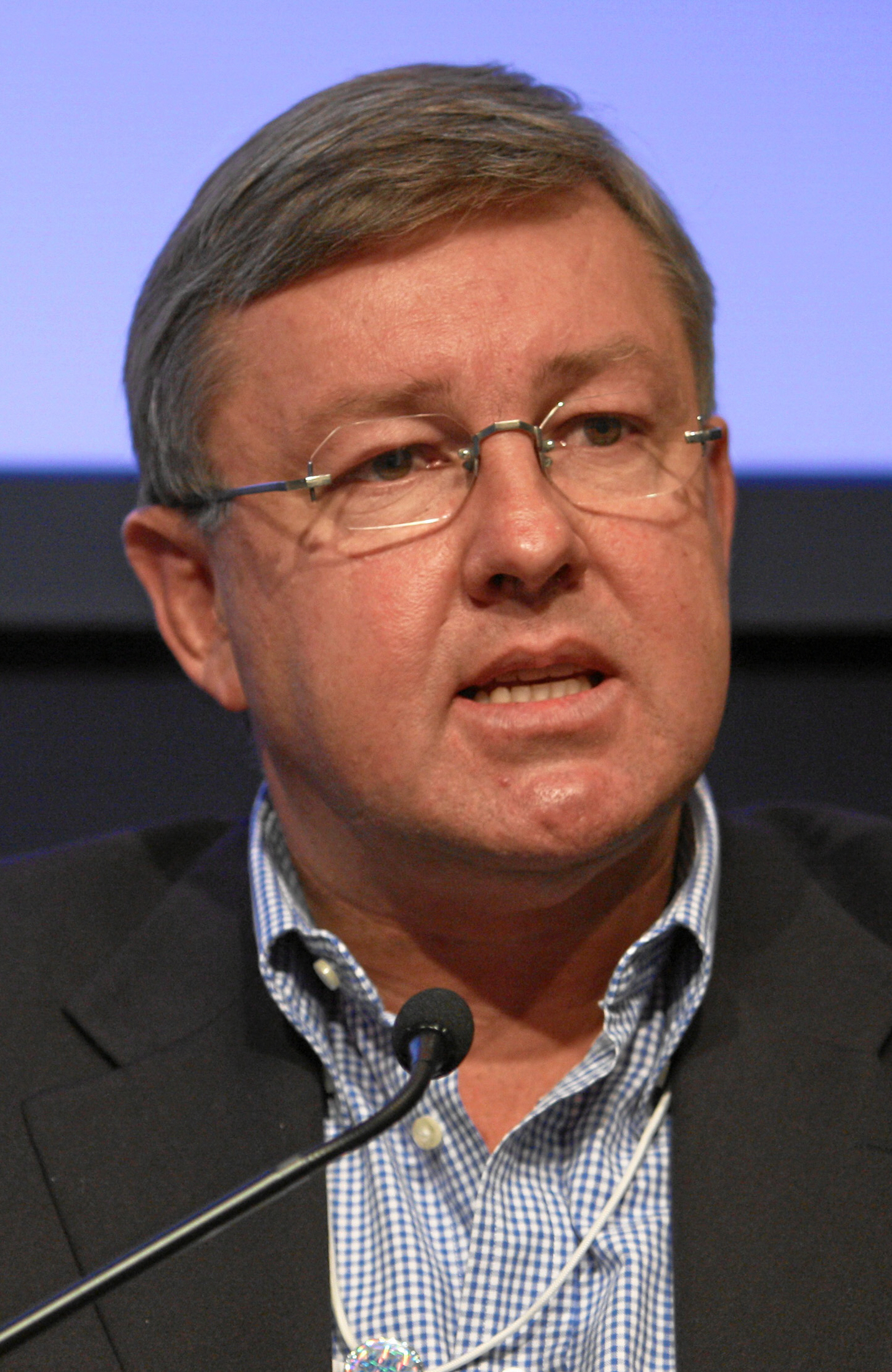
	First party	Second party	Third party
Leader	Thabo Mbeki	Tony Leon	Mangosuthu Buthelezi
Party	ANC	DA	IFP
Last election	66.35%, 266 seats	9.56%, 38 seats (Note: As Democratic Party.)	8.58%, 34 seats
Seats won	279	50	28
Seat change	▲13	▲12	▼6
Popular vote	10,880,915	1,931,201	1,088,664
Percentage	69.69%	12.37%	6.97%
Swing	▲3.34pp	▲2.81pp	▼1.61pp
	Fourth party	Fifth party	Sixth party
Leader	Bantu Holomisa	Patricia de Lille	Marthinus van Schalkwyk
Party	UDM	ID	NNP
Last election	3.42%, 14 seats	Did not exist	6.87%, 28 seats
Seats won	9	7	7
Seat change	▼5	New party	▼21
Popular vote	355,717	269,765	257,824
Percentage	2.28%	1.73%	1.65%
Swing	▼1.14pp	New party	▼5.22pp
President before election
Thabo Mbeki
ANC
Elected President
Thabo Mbeki
ANC

General elections were held in South Africa on Wednesday, 14 April 2004. The African National Congress (ANC) of President Thabo Mbeki, which came to power after the end of the apartheid system in 1994, was re-elected with an increased majority. These were the third elections held since the end of the apartheid era.

The ANC, which had been in power since 1994, obtained 69.7% of votes cast on the national ballot, theoretically allowing them to change the constitution.

Some 20.6-million people were registered for the 2004 general elections, which was about 2 million more than in 1999. About 76% of registered voters took part in the election, with the ANC receiving 69.7% of the votes cast. However, only 56% of eligible voters (South African citizens of voting age) took part in the 2004 election, which means that the ANC received votes from only about 38% of all eligible voters.

The year 2004 saw an increase in voter abstention and there was at least one high-profile election and registration boycotts campaign, the No Land! No House! No Vote! Campaign. A major electoral issue during the election was the dominance of the ANC; detractors of the ANC, most notably the Democratic Alliance, argued that the party's political dominance posed a threat to the country's democratic institutions and that voters should therefore vote for opposition parties.

The main opposition party, the Democratic Alliance, also obtained an increased percentage on the national ballot, most likely from former supporters of the New National Party (NNP), possibly losing some support to Patricia de Lille's new Independent Democrats. The NNP, a descendant of the ruling party of the apartheid era, collapsed and lost most of their support, dropping from 6.9% in 1999 to 1.7% (it was 20.4% in 1994), many of their supporters being unhappy with their alliance with the ANC. The NNP alliance with the ANC allowed the ANC gain control of the Western Cape and City of Cape Town; following the election the NNP elected to dissolve and merge with the ANC.

The Independent Democrats surprised many observers by obtaining more votes than the New National Party, becoming the fifth largest party. The Inkatha Freedom Party lost some support, including the majority in their stronghold province of Kwazulu-Natal, while the United Democratic Movement also lost support, barely hanging on as opposition in their stronghold, the Eastern Cape. As of 2024 this is the last election in which the ANC made gains in both seats and popular vote.

== Electoral system ==
The South African National Assembly consists of 400 members, elected by closed list proportional representation. 200 members are elected from national party lists, and the other 200 are elected from party lists in each of the nine provinces. The President of South Africa is chosen by the National Assembly after each election.

== Events ==
A corruption scandal dubbed "Oilgate" by the South African media surfaced when it was reported that R11 million was transferred from the state owned PetroSA to help fund the African National Congress' election campaign. Following the election the Mail and Guardian newspaper was controversially gagged from publishing a report on the Oilgate scandal.

== National Assembly results ==
Party	Votes	%	Seats	+/–
African National Congress	10,880,915	69.69	279	+13
Democratic Alliance	1,931,201	12.37	50	+12
Inkatha Freedom Party	1,088,664	6.97	28	−6
United Democratic Movement	355,717	2.28	9	−5
Independent Democrats	269,765	1.73	7	New
New National Party	257,824	1.65	7	−21
African Christian Democratic Party	250,272	1.60	7	+1
Freedom Front Plus	139,465	0.89	4	+1
United Christian Democratic Party	117,792	0.75	3	0
Pan Africanist Congress	113,512	0.73	3	0
Minority Front	55,267	0.35	2	+1
Azanian People's Organisation	39,116	0.25	1	0
Christian Democratic Party	17,619	0.11	0	New
National Action	15,804	0.10	0	New
Peace and Justice Congress	15,187	0.10	0	New
Socialist Party of Azania	14,853	0.10	0	0
New Labour Party	13,318	0.09	0	New
United Front	11,889	0.08	0	New
Employment Movement for South Africa	10,446	0.07	0	New
The Organisation Party	7,531	0.05	0	New
Keep It Straight and Simple Party	6,514	0.04	0	0
Total	15,612,671	100.00	400	0
Valid votes	15,612,671	98.42		
Invalid/blank votes	250,887	1.58		
Total votes	15,863,558	100.00		
Registered voters/turnout	20,674,926	76.73		
Source: Election Resources

According to political scientist Michael Gallagher, this election was the most proportional in modern history, with a Gallagher Index of 0.26.

=== Contested seat ===
When the official results were released, the ACDP successfully challenged the outcome. As a result, one of the two seats AZAPO won initially was handed over to the ACDP.

== Provincial legislature results ==
Elections for the nine provincial parliaments were held at the same time as for the National Assembly.

Party	EC	FS	G	KZN	L	M	NW	NC	WC
African National Congress	51	25	51	38	45	27	27	21	19
Democratic Alliance	5	3	15	7	2	2	2	3	12
Inkatha Freedom Party			2	30					
United Democratic Movement	6		1	1	1				1
African Christian Democratic Party		1	1	2	1			1	2
New National Party								2	5
Independent Democrats			1					2	3
Freedom Front Plus		1	1			1	1	1	
United Christian Democratic Party							3		
Pan Africanist Congress	1		1						
Minority Front				2					
Total	63	30	73	80	49	30	33	30	42

=== Eastern Cape ===
Party	Votes	%	Seats	+/–
African National Congress	1,768,987	79.27	51	+4
United Democratic Movement	205,993	9.23	6	−3
Democratic Alliance	163,785	7.34	5	+1
Pan Africanist Congress	22,324	1.00	1	0
African Christian Democratic Party	17,372	0.78	0	0
Independent Democrats	17,314	0.78	0	New
New National Party	14,084	0.63	0	−2
Freedom Front Plus	5,692	0.26	0	0
Inkatha Freedom Party	4,373	0.20	0	0
Azanian People's Organisation	3,884	0.17	0	New
Socialist Party of Azania	3,356	0.15	0	New
United Christian Democratic Party	2,707	0.12	0	New
National Action	1,672	0.07	0	New
Total	2,231,543	100.00	63	0
Valid votes	2,231,543	98.75		
Invalid/blank votes	28,360	1.25		
Total votes	2,259,903	100.00		
Registered voters/turnout	2,849,486	79.31		
Source: Election Resources

=== Free State ===
Party	Votes	%	Seats	+/–
African National Congress	827,338	81.78	25	0
Democratic Alliance	85,714	8.47	3	+1
Freedom Front Plus	24,946	2.47	1	0
African Christian Democratic Party	13,119	1.30	1	+1
Pan Africanist Congress	11,969	1.18	0	0
Dikwankwetla Party	9,806	0.97	0	New
United Democratic Movement	8,947	0.88	0	0
New National Party	8,295	0.82	0	−2
United Christian Democratic Party	7,825	0.77	0	0
Independent Democrats	5,289	0.52	0	New
Azanian People's Organisation	3,571	0.35	0	New
Inkatha Freedom Party	3,563	0.35	0	0
National Action	1,224	0.12	0	New
Total	1,011,606	100.00	30	0
Valid votes	1,011,606	98.46		
Invalid/blank votes	15,795	1.54		
Total votes	1,027,401	100.00		
Registered voters/turnout	1,321,195	77.76		
Source: Election Resources

=== Gauteng ===
Party	Votes	%	Seats	+/–
African National Congress	2,331,121	68.40	51	+1
Democratic Alliance	708,081	20.78	15	+2
Inkatha Freedom Party	85,500	2.51	2	−1
African Christian Democratic Party	55,991	1.64	1	0
Independent Democrats	51,921	1.52	1	New
Freedom Front Plus	45,648	1.34	1	0
United Democratic Movement	33,644	0.99	1	0
Pan Africanist Congress	29,076	0.85	1	+1
New National Party	25,992	0.76	0	−3
United Christian Democratic Party	8,857	0.26	0	0
Azanian People's Organisation	8,670	0.25	0	0
Christian Democratic Party	7,773	0.23	0	New
National Action	4,712	0.14	0	New
Peace and Justice Congress	3,208	0.09	0	New
Socialist Party of Azania	3,191	0.09	0	0
Economic Freedom Movement	1,862	0.05	0	New
Pro-Death Penalty Party	1,825	0.05	0	New
Black People's Convention	1,236	0.04	0	New
Total	3,408,308	100.00	73	0
Valid votes	3,408,308	98.73		
Invalid/blank votes	43,917	1.27		
Total votes	3,452,225	100.00		
Registered voters/turnout	4,650,594	74.23		
Source: Election Resources

=== KwaZulu-Natal ===
Party	Votes	%	Seats	+/–
African National Congress	1,287,823	46.98	38	+6
Inkatha Freedom Party	1,009,267	36.82	30	−4
Democratic Alliance	228,857	8.35	7	+1
Minority Front	71,540	2.61	2	0
African Christian Democratic Party	48,892	1.78	2	+1
United Democratic Movement	20,546	0.75	1	0
New National Party	14,218	0.52	0	−3
Independent Democrats	13,556	0.49	0	New
Freedom Front Plus	7,764	0.28	0	0
Azanian People's Organisation	7,061	0.26	0	0
Pan Africanist Congress	5,118	0.19	0	0
Socialist Party of Azania	5,023	0.18	0	0
Christian Democratic Party	4,980	0.18	0	New
Izwi Lethu Party	4,858	0.18	0	New
United Christian Democratic Party	3,921	0.14	0	New
Peace and Development Party	3,154	0.12	0	New
Royal Loyal Progress	3,141	0.11	0	New
Independent African Movement	1,546	0.06	0	New
Total	2,741,265	100.00	80	0
Valid votes	2,741,265	98.52		
Invalid/blank votes	41,300	1.48		
Total votes	2,782,565	100.00		
Registered voters/turnout	3,819,864	72.84		
Source: Election Resources

=== Limpopo ===
Party	Votes	%	Seats	+/–
African National Congress	1,439,853	89.18	45	+1
Democratic Alliance	57,930	3.59	2	+1
United Democratic Movement	27,780	1.72	1	0
African Christian Democratic Party	20,418	1.26	1	0
Pan Africanist Congress of Azania	15,222	0.94	0	−1
Alliance for Democracy and Prosperity	9,933	0.62	0	New
Freedom Front Plus	9,724	0.60	0	0
Ximoko Party	9,587	0.59	0	0
Azanian People's Organisation	8,204	0.51	0	0
New National Party	7,443	0.46	0	−1
United Christian Democratic Party	3,477	0.22	0	New
Independent Democrats	2,730	0.17	0	New
National Action	2,213	0.14	0	New
Total	1,614,514	100.00	49	0
Valid votes	1,614,514	98.66		
Invalid/blank votes	21,947	1.34		
Total votes	1,636,461	100.00		
Registered voters/turnout	2,187,912	74.80		
Source: Election Resources

=== Mpumalanga ===
Party	Votes	%	Seats	+/–
African National Congress	959,436	86.30	27	+1
Democratic Alliance	77,119	6.94	2	+1
Freedom Front Plus	13,732	1.24	1	0
African Christian Democratic Party	12,065	1.09	0	0
United Democratic Movement	11,161	1.00	0	−1
Inkatha Freedom Party	10,643	0.96	0	0
Pan Africanist Congress	7,668	0.69	0	0
Sindawonye Progressive Party	5,925	0.53	0	0
New National Party	5,122	0.46	0	−1
Independent Democrats	3,406	0.31	0	New
Azanian People's Organisation	2,113	0.19	0	0
United Christian Democratic Party	1,878	0.17	0	0
Socialist Party of Azania	1,424	0.13	0	New
Total	1,111,692	100.00	30	0
Valid votes	1,111,692	98.42		
Invalid/blank votes	17,792	1.58		
Total votes	1,129,484	100.00		
Registered voters/turnout	1,442,472	78.30		
Source: Election Resources

=== North West ===
Party	Votes	%	Seats	+/–
African National Congress	1,048,089	80.71	27	0
United Christian Democratic Party	110,233	8.49	3	0
Democratic Alliance	64,925	5.00	2	+1
Freedom Front Plus	17,123	1.32	1	0
African Christian Democratic Party	15,138	1.17	0	0
United Democratic Movement	12,513	0.96	0	0
Pan Africanist Congress	10,923	0.84	0	0
Independent Democrats	5,709	0.44	0	New
New National Party	5,592	0.43	0	−1
Azanian People's Organisation	3,718	0.29	0	New
Inkatha Freedom Party	3,211	0.25	0	0
National Action	1,389	0.11	0	New
Total	1,298,563	100.00	33	0
Valid votes	1,298,563	98.24		
Invalid/blank votes	23,224	1.76		
Total votes	1,321,787	100.00		
Registered voters/turnout	1,749,529	75.55		
Source: Election Resources

=== Northern Cape ===
Party	Votes	%	Seats	+/–
African National Congress	219,365	68.83	21	+1
Democratic Alliance	35,297	11.08	3	+2
New National Party	23,970	7.52	2	−6
Independent Democrats	22,485	7.06	2	New
African Christian Democratic Party	5,995	1.88	1	+1
Freedom Front Plus	4,948	1.55	1	0
Azanian People's Organisation	1,645	0.52	0	0
United Democratic Movement	1,431	0.45	0	0
Pan Africanist Congress	1,381	0.43	0	0
United Christian Democratic Party	1,042	0.33	0	New
Inkatha Freedom Party	751	0.24	0	0
Cape People's Congress	392	0.12	0	New
Total	318,702	100.00	30	0
Valid votes	318,702	98.40		
Invalid/blank votes	5,192	1.60		
Total votes	323,894	100.00		
Registered voters/turnout	433,591	74.70		
Source: Election Resources

=== Western Cape ===
Party	Votes	%	Seats	+/–
African National Congress	709,052	45.25	19	+1
Democratic Alliance	424,832	27.11	12	+7
New National Party	170,469	10.88	5	−12
Independent Democrats	122,867	7.84	3	New
African Christian Democratic Party	53,934	3.44	2	+1
United Democratic Movement	27,489	1.75	1	0
Africa Muslim Party	11,019	0.70	0	New
New Labour Party	10,526	0.67	0	New
Freedom Front Plus	9,705	0.62	0	0
Pan Africanist Congress	6,524	0.42	0	0
United Christian Democratic Party	3,575	0.23	0	New
Green Party of South Africa	3,317	0.21	0	New
Peace and Justice Congress	3,278	0.21	0	New
National Action	2,248	0.14	0	New
Inkatha Freedom Party	2,222	0.14	0	0
Cape People's Congress	1,960	0.13	0	New
Azanian People's Organisation	1,455	0.09	0	New
Moderate Independent Party	953	0.06	0	New
Peace and Development Party	789	0.05	0	New
Universal Party	735	0.05	0	New
Total	1,566,949	100.00	42	0
Valid votes	1,566,949	99.02		
Invalid/blank votes	15,554	0.98		
Total votes	1,582,503	100.00		
Registered voters/turnout	2,220,283	71.27		
Source: Election Resources

=== NCOP seats ===
The National Council of Provinces (NCOP) consists of 90 members, ten elected by each provincial legislature. The Members of NCOP have to be elected in proportion to the party membership of the provincial legislature.

Determination of delegates to the National Council of Provinces after the 14 April 2004 provincial elections
Party	Delegate type	EC	FS	G	KZN	L	M	NW	NC	WC	Total	
ANC	Permanent	4	4	4	3	5	5	4	4	2	35	65
ANC	Special	4	4	3	2	4	4	4	3	2	30	65
DA	Permanent	1	1	1	1	1	1	1	1	2	10	12
DA	Special			1						1	2	12
IFP	Permanent			1	2						3	5
IFP	Special				2						2	5
ID	Permanent									1	1	2
ID	Special								1		1	2
NNP	Permanent								1	1	2	
ACDP	Special									1	1	
VF+	Permanent		1								1	
UCDP	Permanent							1			1	
UDM	Permanent	1									1	
Total		10	10	10	10	10	10	10	10	10	90	

== Aftermath ==
Thabo Mbeki was re-elected president (unopposed) by the National Assembly on 23 April 2004 in 2004 South African presidential election.
