= Alliance for Transformation for All =

Political party from South Africa

- Founded: 2018
- Ideology: Single-issue politics
- National Assembly seats: 0 / 400
- Provincial Legislatures: 0 / 430

Website
- www.facebook.com/Alliance-for-Transformation-for-all-ATA-347430669149743/

The Alliance for Transformation for All (ATA) is a South African political party founded in 2018 to lobby for the interests of the taxi industry.

The party is campaigning for subsidies to the minibus taxi industry, and for taxi drivers to self-regulate their industry. The South African National Taxi Council (Santaco) has distanced itself from the party.

ATA contested the 2019 general election, failing to win a seat.

== Election results ==
=== National elections ===
Election	Total votes	Share of vote	Seats	+/–	Government
2019	14,266	0.08%	0 / 400	–	extraparliamentary

=== Provincial elections ===
Election	Eastern Cape		Free State		Gauteng		Kwazulu-Natal		Limpopo		Mpumalanga		North-West		Northern Cape		Western Cape	
Election	%	Seats	%	Seats	%	Seats	%	Seats	%	Seats	%	Seats	%	Seats	%	Seats	%	Seats
2019	0.27%	0/63	0.04%	0/30	0.03%	0/73	0.07%	1/80	-	-	0.04%	0/30	0.06%	0/33	-	-	0.30%	0/42
