= Gazankulu Liberation Congress =

Political party in South Africa

- Chairperson: Themba Chabani
- Founded: 2016
- Headquarters: Giyani, Limpopo
- Ideology: Regionalism
- National Assembly seats: 0 / 400
- Provincial Legislatures: 0 / 430

The Gazankulu Liberation Congress (GLC) is a minor political party based in Giyani, South Africa.

The party wishes to relocate the Limpopo capital from Polokwane to Giyani, is campaigning for the reintroduction of the death-penalty, and advocates offering a R2500 monthly subsidy to new university students.

In July 2018 the party issued a list of demands to the Greater Giyani Local Municipality requesting more public toilets, stalls for hawkers, and that the council recover the money invested in the collapsed VBS Bank, threatening to shut down Giyani if its demands were not met.

In September 2018, the GLC opened a case of hate speech and incitement of violence against the chairman of the soccer club Black Leopards, David Thidiela, stating that Thidiela's criticism of the referee amounted to "serious hatred of the official and his ethnic group [the] Vatshonga Machangana people”.

The party has received criticism for its name, which is reminiscent of the Gazankulu bantustan.

The party contested the 2019 South African general election at provincial level in Gauteng and Limpopo only, failing to win a seat.

== Election results ==
=== Provincial elections ===
Election	Eastern Cape		Free State		Gauteng		Kwazulu-Natal		Limpopo		Mpumalanga		North-West		Northern Cape		Western Cape	
Election	%	Seats	%	Seats	%	Seats	%	Seats	%	Seats	%	Seats	%	Seats	%	Seats	%	Seats
2019	-	-	-	-	0.02%	0/73	-	-	0.03%	0/49	-	-	-	-	-	-	-	-
