= Women Forward =

Political party in South Africa

- President: Nana Ngobese
- Founded: 25 June 2008
- Ideology: Feminism
- National Assembly seats: 0 / 400
- Provincial Legislatures: 0 / 430

Website
- wf.org.za

Women Forward (WF) is a South African political party founded aimed at uplifting women and advocating for women's rights.

Initially formed to contest the 2009 South African General elections, the party grew and began running for elections itself. Women Forward's membership spans women, men, and LGBTQI people. Their mission is to "work towards a more inclusive world" for women. Missions include eradicating gender-based violence, improve sex education as well as getting more women in positions of government.

Women Forward has caused controversies surrounding its view on rapists as well as allegedly excluding sex workers on their platform.

As of the 2019 South African general election, Women Forward has not won any seats in the National Assembly or Provincial Legislatures.

== History ==
Ngobese was inspired to create Women Forward by her grandfather's advocacy for "female leadership"; he wrote about the immense influence a mother has on a child as well as how his wife edited every one of his speeches. Ngobese also says women are more naturally "caring" and "inclusive", making them better suited to be leaders.

Ngobese worked as a gender consultant for a decade, and then joined the government. After becoming concerned about the lack of governmental concerns for gender issues, Ngobese decided to start her own political party. Women Forward was founded on 25 June 2008, as an independent political party out of South Africa.

The party contested the 2009 South African General elections, subsequently lost and lost their deposit in the process.

The party's manifesto was launched in Rustenburg on 30 March 2019.

== Membership ==
Women Forward has over 30,000 members within South Africa. Most membership is centered out of Limpopo, South Africa.

Membership is open to people who identify as LGBTQI. Men are also permitted to join, as long as they "listen more to women's ways of doing things." Women Forward is also committed to actively recruiting "women of all races" to become members.

== Mission ==
Women Forward's mission is to "help rebuild grassroots movement to advance women's agenda, democracy, freedom, peace, and justice."

The party has a manifesto that lays out its major points of interest. Their main issues are:

1. Eradication of Extreme Poverty and High Unemployment Levels
2. Eradication of Gender-Based Violence (GBV) due to High Levels of Crime
3. Introduction of Robust Sex Education for both boys and girls to combat teen pregnancy and other health hazards by pre-adulthood sex
4. Introduction of Targeted Education (Skills Development) for all women, including those 35 years of age and above
5. Addressing Land Ownership by Marginalized Women/Families
6. Focusing on the Environment and Sustainability for Community Wellbeing

Their manifesto also has a "call to action", urging the people of South Africa to come together to empower women to help them "achieve self-determination."

Women Forward aims to achieve gender parity in the South African government by 2025.

== Controversies ==
In March 2019, Ngobese said:

"I actually think rapists should be executed, but castration is the second best. Rape is the worst of all crime and at the moment the law's response is pitiful."

Ngobese went on to say the party would advocate for the castration of rapists and child assaulters.

Women Forward has also been criticized for not addressing how lack of resources due to capitalism stops women from accessing basic services and impedes their livelihoods. Although it has been alleged that Women Forward fails to recognize women who work in informal sectors, such as sex work, effectively excluding them, such speculations are false as Ngobese has debunked these claims and affirms that Women Forward includes and advocates for all women, including sex workers.

Critics have also claimed that Women Forward is not a feminist party, rather, promotes ideas about women that are detrimental and further bolsters the point that politics are only for men.

== Election results ==
=== National elections ===
Election	Total votes	Share of vote	Seats	+/–	Government
2009	5,087	0.03%	0 / 400	-	extraparliamentary
2019	6,108	0.04%	0 / 400	-	extraparliamentary

=== Provincial elections ===
Election	Eastern Cape		Free State		Gauteng		Kwazulu-Natal		Limpopo		Mpumalanga		North-West		Northern Cape		Western Cape	
Election	%	Seats	%	Seats	%	Seats	%	Seats	%	Seats	%	Seats	%	Seats	%	Seats	%	Seats
2019	-	-	0.05%	0/30	0.05%	0/73	0.03%	0/80	0.02%	0/49	-	-	0.06%	0/33	-	-	-	-

== Future Outlooks ==
As of the 2019 election, Women Forward had not won any provincial seats or elections.

Ngobese has said that "funds and the political environment was not as conducive to putting the party forward" as of 2019.
