= African Covenant =

Political party from South Africa

- Founder: Dr Convy Baloyi
- Founded: March 2018
- Ideology: Conservatism; Christian right Social conservatism
- Political position: Right-wing
- National Assembly seats: 0 / 400
- Provincial Legislatures: 0 / 430

Website
- www.acoparty.co.za

African Covenant (ACO) is a conservative religious South African political party formed in 2018 by Convy Baloyi.

The party is proposing the return of the death penalty for murder and abortion, and wishes to overturn the legalisation of same-sex marriage in South Africa, describing marriage as an institution uniting "one man and one woman".

Baloyi stated that with supernatural aid African Covenant would be the ruling party after the 2019 general election.

The party failed to win a seat.

== National elections ==
Election	Total votes	Share of vote	Seats	+/–	Government
2019	7,019	0.04%	0 / 400	–	extraparliamentary

== Provincial elections ==
Election	Eastern Cape		Free State		Gauteng		Kwazulu-Natal		Limpopo		Mpumalanga		North-West		Northern Cape		Western Cape	
Election	%	Seats	%	Seats	%	Seats	%	Seats	%	Seats	%	Seats	%	Seats	%	Seats	%	Seats
2019	0.03%	0/63	0.04%	0/30	0.06%	0/73	0.03%	0/80	0.05%	0/49	0.04%	0/30	0.05%	0/33	0.05%	0/30	0.05%	0/42
