= Mogale City Local Municipality elections =

Local elections in Gauteng, South Africa

The Mogale City Local Municipality council consists of seventy-seven members elected by mixed-member proportional representation. Thirty-nine councillors are elected by first-past-the-post voting in thirty-nine wards, while the remaining thirty-eight are chosen from party lists so that the total number of party representatives is proportional to the number of votes received.

In the election of 4 November 2026 no party won a majority. The Democratic Alliance (DA) won the largest number of seats.

== Results ==
The following table shows the composition of the council after past elections.

Event	ANC	DA	EFF	FF+	IFP	Other	Total
2000 election	42	20	—	—	1	1	64
2006 election	42	16	—	2	1	3	64
2011 election	41	23	—	1	1	2	68
2016 election	38	27	9	2	1	0	77
2021 election	31	25	11	6	1	3	77
2026 election	23	27	6	7	1	13	77

== December 2000 election ==
The following table shows the results of the 2000 election.

Party	Ward			List			Total seats
Party	Votes	%	Seats	Votes	%	Seats	Total seats
African National Congress	38,057	65.04	23	38,032	64.97	19	42
Democratic Alliance	17,809	30.44	9	18,179	31.05	11	20
Inkatha Freedom Party	1,005	1.72	0	991	1.69	1	1
Independent candidates	986	1.69	0				0
United Democratic Movement	317	0.54	0	560	0.96	1	1
Azanian People's Organisation	256	0.44	0	600	1.02	0	0
Africa Women and Youth Party	79	0.14	0	179	0.31	0	0
Total	58,509	100.00	32	58,541	100.00	32	64
Valid votes	58,509	97.60		58,541	97.63		
Invalid/blank votes	1,441	2.40		1,419	2.37		
Total votes	59,950	100.00		59,960	100.00		
Registered voters/turnout	130,222	46.04		130,222	46.04		

== March 2006 election ==
The following table shows the results of the 2006 election.

Party	Ward			List			Total seats
Party	Votes	%	Seats	Votes	%	Seats	Total seats
African National Congress	44,425	64.76	24	44,461	65.06	18	42
Democratic Alliance	16,874	24.60	8	16,864	24.68	8	16
Freedom Front Plus	1,719	2.51	0	1,844	2.70	2	2
Independent Democrats	1,787	2.60	0	1,722	2.52	1	1
Inkatha Freedom Party	919	1.34	0	910	1.33	1	1
African Christian Democratic Party	855	1.25	0	850	1.24	1	1
Azanian People's Organisation	814	1.19	0	794	1.16	1	1
Pan Africanist Congress of Azania	344	0.50	0	718	1.05	0	0
Independent candidates	699	1.02	0				0
Christian Democratic Party	168	0.24	0	172	0.25	0	0
Total	68,604	100.00	32	68,335	100.00	32	64
Valid votes	68,604	98.48		68,335	98.16		
Invalid/blank votes	1,057	1.52		1,280	1.84		
Total votes	69,661	100.00		69,615	100.00		
Registered voters/turnout	148,503	46.91		148,503	46.88		

== May 2011 election ==
The following table shows the results of the 2011 election.

Party	Ward			List			Total seats
Party	Votes	%	Seats	Votes	%	Seats	Total seats
African National Congress	62,171	59.77	25	63,614	60.95	16	41
Democratic Alliance	34,467	33.13	9	34,078	32.65	14	23
People's Civic Organisation	1,804	1.73	0	1,617	1.55	1	1
Congress of the People	1,605	1.54	0	1,544	1.48	1	1
Freedom Front Plus	1,560	1.50	0	1,362	1.30	1	1
Inkatha Freedom Party	679	0.65	0	643	0.62	1	1
National Freedom Party	509	0.49	0	597	0.57	0	0
African Christian Democratic Party	381	0.37	0	568	0.54	0	0
Azanian People's Organisation	403	0.39	0	351	0.34	0	0
Independent candidates	445	0.43	0				0
Total	104,024	100.00	34	104,374	100.00	34	68
Valid votes	104,024	98.73		104,374	98.93		
Invalid/blank votes	1,337	1.27		1,129	1.07		
Total votes	105,361	100.00		105,503	100.00		
Registered voters/turnout	175,799	59.93		175,799	60.01		

== August 2016 election ==
The following table shows the results of the 2016 election.

Party	Ward			List			Total seats
Party	Votes	%	Seats	Votes	%	Seats	Total seats
African National Congress	58,071	48.87	28	57,956	48.81	10	38
Democratic Alliance	41,472	34.90	11	41,383	34.85	16	27
Economic Freedom Fighters	13,860	11.67	0	13,805	11.63	9	9
Freedom Front Plus	2,766	2.33	0	2,663	2.24	2	2
Inkatha Freedom Party	804	0.68	0	881	0.74	1	1
Congress of the People	453	0.38	0	424	0.36	0	0
African Christian Democratic Party	387	0.33	0	474	0.40	0	0
Pan Africanist Congress of Azania	357	0.30	0	498	0.42	0	0
People's Civic Organisation	264	0.22	0	296	0.25	0	0
United Democratic Movement	198	0.17	0	163	0.14	0	0
Azanian People's Organisation	121	0.10	0	124	0.10	0	0
Economic Growth Organisation	52	0.04	0	26	0.02	0	0
International Revelation Congress	11	0.01	0	49	0.04	0	0
Total	118,816	100.00	39	118,742	100.00	38	77
Valid votes	118,816	98.84		118,742	98.82		
Invalid/blank votes	1,393	1.16		1,420	1.18		
Total votes	120,209	100.00		120,162	100.00		
Registered voters/turnout	193,028	62.28		193,028	62.25		

== November 2021 election ==
The following table shows the results of the 2021 election.

Party	Ward			List			Total seats
Party	Votes	%	Seats	Votes	%	Seats	Total seats
African National Congress	36,370	40.40	27	35,570	39.94	4	31
Democratic Alliance	28,798	31.99	12	28,983	32.54	13	25
Economic Freedom Fighters	12,477	13.86	0	12,396	13.92	11	11
Freedom Front Plus	7,099	7.88	0	6,835	7.67	6	6
Inkatha Freedom Party	1,476	1.64	0	971	1.09	1	1
African Christian Democratic Party	876	0.97	0	931	1.05	1	1
Pan Africanist Congress of Azania	662	0.74	0	641	0.72	1	1
African Transformation Movement	518	0.58	0	523	0.59	1	1
African Independent Congress	147	0.16	0	740	0.83	0	0
Congress of the People	309	0.34	0	264	0.30	0	0
United Democratic Movement	267	0.30	0	304	0.34	0	0
Independent candidates	379	0.42	0				0
Activists Movement of South Africa	157	0.17	0	206	0.23	0	0
Justice and Employment Party	122	0.14	0	112	0.13	0	0
Forum for Service Delivery	76	0.08	0	142	0.16	0	0
Azanian People's Organisation	129	0.14	0	78	0.09	0	0
The Organic Humanity Movement	92	0.10	0	73	0.08	0	0
United Christian Democratic Party	30	0.03	0	100	0.11	0	0
National Freedom Party	24	0.03	0	72	0.08	0	0
African Security Congress	15	0.02	0	68	0.08	0	0
African People's Movement	9	0.01	0	47	0.05	0	0
Total	90,032	100.00	39	89,056	100.00	38	77
Valid votes	90,032	98.42		89,056	98.08		
Invalid/blank votes	1,446	1.58		1,747	1.92		
Total votes	91,478	100.00		90,803	100.00		
Registered voters/turnout	188,367	48.56		188,367	48.21		

=== By-elections from November 2021 ===
The following by-elections were held to fill vacant ward seats in the period from November 2021.

Date	Ward	Party of the previous councillor	Party of the newly elected councillor
30 Nov 2022	22	Democratic Alliance	Democratic Alliance
24 Apr 2024	39	Democratic Alliance	Democratic Alliance
11 Sep 2024	12	African National Congress	African National Congress
3 Feb 2026	2	African National Congress	African National Congress

In ward 22, the previous DA councillor joined the provincial legislature. The DA candidate retained the seat for the party, with a similar vote share to 2021.

== November 2026 election ==
The following table shows the results of the 2026 election.

Party	Ward			List			Total seats
Party	Votes	%	Seats	Votes	%	Seats	Total seats
Democratic Alliance	40,490	36.64	16	40,597	36.67	11	27
African National Congress	28,890	26.14	23	28,471	25.72	0	23
Freedom Front Plus	10,084	9.13	0	10,212	9.22	7	7
ActionSA	9,550	8.64	0	10,024	9.05	7	7
Economic Freedom Fighters	9,044	8.18	0	8,400	7.59	6	6
uMkhonto weSizwe Party	1,593	1.44	0	3,576	3.23	2	2
South African Communist Party	2,014	1.82	0	1,868	1.69	1	1
Rise Mzansi	1,112	1.01	0	1,020	0.92	1	1
Inkatha Freedom Party	922	0.83	0	870	0.79	1	1
African Transformation Movement	661	0.60	0	907	0.82	1	1
Pan Africanist Congress of Azania	737	0.67	0	796	0.72	1	1
Afrika Mayibuye Movement	733	0.66	0	532	0.48	0	0
African Christian Democratic Party	481	0.44	0	756	0.68	0	0
African Independent Congress	641	0.58	0	552	0.50	0	0
Patriotic Alliance	624	0.56	0	505	0.46	0	0
Al Jama-ah	487	0.44	0	473	0.43	0	0
Independent candidates	904	0.82	0				0
Allied Independents Umbrella	458	0.41	0	419	0.38	0	0
Build One South Africa	293	0.27	0	282	0.25	0	0
African People's Convention	199	0.18	0	140	0.13	0	0
United Africans Transformation	51	0.05	0	215	0.19	0	0
Mawusa Movement Party	257	0.23	0				0
Huconomics Justice	83	0.08	0	70	0.06	0	0
Economic Liberators Forum South Africa	83	0.08	0				0
United Democratic Movement	78	0.07	0				0
All African Alliance Movement	32	0.03	0				0
Lekwe Bepe Kingdom Party				19	0.02	0	0
Total	110,501	100.00	39	110,704	100.00	38	77
Valid votes	110,501	98.39		110,704	98.57		
Invalid/blank votes	1,806	1.61		1,606	1.43		
Total votes	112,307	100.00		112,310	100.00		
Registered voters/turnout	202,233	55.53		202,233	55.53		
