= National People's Ambassadors =

Political party in South Africa

- General Secretary: Andile Hlatshwayo
- Founded: 2015
- Ideology: Anti-capitalism; Anti-imperialism; Internationalism
- Political position: Far-left
- National Assembly seats: 0 / 400
- Provincial Legislatures: 0 / 430

Website
- www.facebook.com/National-Peoples-Ambassadors-460549777451398/

The National People's Ambassadors (NPA) is a South African political party formed in 2015. It describes itself as a "radical, left, anti-capitalist and anti-imperialist movement with an internationalist outlook”, and wishes to nationalise mines and banks.

In 2016, general secretary Andile Hlatshwayo laid charges of high treason against the Economic Freedom Fighters Julius Malema.

Also in 2016, the party attempted to organise a strike in the Alfred Duma Local Municipality, aiming to shut all 36 wards in the municipality. The strike was called off after the NPA failed to meet the legal requirements.

The party contested the 2019 general election, failing to win any seats, and receiving the fewest votes of all 48 parties contesting nationally.

In January 2024, party leader Nathi Mthethwa announced that he had joined the Umkhonto we Sizwe party.

== Election results ==
=== National elections ===
Election	Total votes	Share of vote	Seats	+/–	Government
2019	1,979	0.01%	0 / 400	–	extraparliamentary

=== Provincial elections ===
Election	Eastern Cape		Free State		Gauteng		Kwazulu-Natal		Limpopo		Mpumalanga		North-West		Northern Cape		Western Cape	
Election	%	Seats	%	Seats	%	Seats	%	Seats	%	Seats	%	Seats	%	Seats	%	Seats	%	Seats
2019	-	-	-	-	-	-	0.04%	0/80	-	-	-	-	-	-	-	-	-	-
