= Christian Political Movement =

Political party in South Africa

- Founded: 2014
- Ideology: Christian democracy
- National Assembly seats: 0 / 400
- Provincial Legislatures: 0 / 430

Website
- www.cpmsa.org.za

The Christian Political Movement (CPM) is a South African political party led by Brian Lonwabo Mahlati, the founder of the New Life Family Bible Church, based in Mdantsane.

It was established in 2014 (and officially registered with the Independent Electoral Commission in 2018) by a group of pastors and leaders from numerous South African churches.

The party contested the 2019 general election, and Mahlati stated that he was confident the CPM would win.

The party failed to win any seats.

== Election results ==
=== National elections ===
Election	Total votes	Share of vote	Seats	+/–	Government
2019	4,980	0.03%	0 / 400	–	extraparliamentary

=== Provincial elections ===
Election	Eastern Cape		Free State		Gauteng		Kwazulu-Natal		Limpopo		Mpumalanga		North-West		Northern Cape		Western Cape	
Election	%	Seats	%	Seats	%	Seats	%	Seats	%	Seats	%	Seats	%	Seats	%	Seats	%	Seats
2019	0.05%	0/63	-	-	-	-	-	-	-	-	-	-	-	-	-	-	-	-
