= Metsimaholo Local Municipality elections =

Local elections in the Free State, South Africa

The Metsimaholo Local Municipality council consists of forty-six members elected by mixed-member proportional representation. Twenty-three councillors are elected by first-past-the-post voting in twenty-three wards, while the remaining twenty-three are chosen from party lists so that the total number of party representatives is proportional to the number of votes received.

In the election of 1 November 2021, no party won a majority on the council. The Economic Freedom Fighters (EFF) formed a coalition with the African National Congress (ANC). The EFF's Selloane Motjeane was elected mayor, while Lucas Fisher of the ANC was elected Speaker and Fikile Msokweni of the ANC the Council Whip. Shortly after, the EFF ordered the mayor to stand down, as the party rejected working with the ANC.

In the election of 4 November 2026, no party won a majority on the council. The ANC won the largest number of seats.

== Results ==
The following table shows the composition of the council after past elections.

Event	ANC	DA	EFF	FF+	SMM	UDM	Other	Total
2000 election	18	9	—	—	—	1	5	33
2006 election	24	8	—	1	—	2	1	36
2011 election	26	15	—	1	—	—	0	42
2016 election	19	12	8	1	—	—	2	42
2021 election	16	12	12	3	—	—	3	46
2026 election	17	11	5	3	5	—	5	46

== December 2000 election ==
The following table shows the results of the 2000 election.

Party	Ward			List			Total seats
Party	Votes	%	Seats	Votes	%	Seats	Total seats
African National Congress	14,838	54.57	12	14,823	54.67	6	18
Democratic Alliance	7,127	26.21	4	7,276	26.84	5	9
Independent Civic Organisation of South Africa	3,272	12.03	1	3,121	11.51	3	4
United Democratic Movement	1,129	4.15	0	1,103	4.07	1	1
Pan Africanist Congress of Azania	345	1.27	0	290	1.07	1	1
Alliance 2000+	274	1.01	0	219	0.81	0	0
Azanian People's Organisation	204	0.75	0	281	1.04	0	0
Total	27,189	100.00	17	27,113	100.00	16	33
Valid votes	27,189	98.67		27,113	98.49		
Invalid/blank votes	367	1.33		416	1.51		
Total votes	27,556	100.00		27,529	100.00		
Registered voters/turnout	54,230	50.81		54,230	50.76		

== March 2006 election ==
The following table shows the results of the 2006 election.

Party	Ward			List			Total seats
Party	Votes	%	Seats	Votes	%	Seats	Total seats
African National Congress	19,288	65.37	14	19,226	65.45	10	24
Democratic Alliance	6,220	21.08	4	6,184	21.05	4	8
United Democratic Movement	1,459	4.94	0	1,513	5.15	2	2
Freedom Front Plus	761	2.58	0	760	2.59	1	1
United Independent Front	775	2.63	0	679	2.31	1	1
Pan Africanist Congress of Azania	381	1.29	0	341	1.16	0	0
Azanian People's Organisation	343	1.16	0	342	1.16	0	0
African Christian Democratic Party	181	0.61	0	332	1.13	0	0
Independent candidates	100	0.34	0				0
Total	29,508	100.00	18	29,377	100.00	18	36
Valid votes	29,508	98.22		29,377	97.84		
Invalid/blank votes	536	1.78		648	2.16		
Total votes	30,044	100.00		30,025	100.00		
Registered voters/turnout	62,063	48.41		62,063	48.38		

== May 2011 election ==
The following table shows the results of the 2011 election.

Party	Ward			List			Total seats
Party	Votes	%	Seats	Votes	%	Seats	Total seats
African National Congress	24,404	62.66	16	24,697	63.42	10	26
Democratic Alliance	13,770	35.36	5	13,662	35.08	10	15
Freedom Front Plus	627	1.61	0	584	1.50	1	1
Independent candidates	113	0.29	0				0
African Christian Democratic Party	30	0.08	0				0
Total	38,944	100.00	21	38,943	100.00	21	42
Valid votes	38,944	98.84		38,943	98.88		
Invalid/blank votes	457	1.16		443	1.12		
Total votes	39,401	100.00		39,386	100.00		
Registered voters/turnout	72,068	54.67		72,068	54.65		

== August 2016 election ==
The following table shows the results of the 2016 election.

Party	Ward			List			Total seats
Party	Votes	%	Seats	Votes	%	Seats	Total seats
African National Congress	20,454	45.38	16	20,037	44.77	3	19
Democratic Alliance	13,074	29.00	5	12,954	28.94	7	12
Economic Freedom Fighters	7,982	17.71	0	8,075	18.04	8	8
Metsimaholo Community Association	2,163	4.80	0	2,246	5.02	2	2
Freedom Front Plus	956	2.12	0	966	2.16	1	1
Congress of the People	66	0.15	0	143	0.32	0	0
African Christian Democratic Party	81	0.18	0	117	0.26	0	0
Independent candidates	189	0.42	0				0
African People's Convention	26	0.06	0	136	0.30	0	0
Pan Africanist Congress of Azania	59	0.13	0	57	0.13	0	0
Alternative African Allegiance	26	0.06	0	23	0.05	0	0
Total	45,076	100.00	21	44,754	100.00	21	42
Valid votes	45,076	98.61		44,754	98.52		
Invalid/blank votes	637	1.39		674	1.48		
Total votes	45,713	100.00		45,428	100.00		
Registered voters/turnout	79,675	57.37		79,675	57.02		

== November 2017 election ==
The municipal council failed to adopt a budget for the 2017/18 financial year because of disagreements between the coalition members. As a result the council was dissolved in July 2017 and an administrator appointed by the provincial government. A new council was elected on 29 November 2017. The following table shows the results of the election.

Party	Ward			List			Total seats	+/–
Party	Votes	%	Seats	Votes	%	Seats	Total seats	+/–
African National Congress	13,177	34.69	16	13,001	33.63	0	16	−3
Democratic Alliance	10,603	27.91	5	10,586	27.38	6	11	−1
Economic Freedom Fighters	7,263	19.12	0	7,740	20.02	8	8	0
South African Communist Party	3,323	8.75	0	3,270	8.46	3	3	New
Freedom Front Plus	1,348	3.55	0	1,278	3.31	1	1	0
African Independent Congress	716	1.88	0	1,110	2.87	1	1	New
Metsimaholo Community Association	629	1.66	0	655	1.69	1	1	−1
Forum for Service Delivery	405	1.07	0	391	1.01	1	1	New
Congress of the People	68	0.18	0	164	0.42	0	0	0
People's Movement	114	0.30	0	115	0.30	–	0	New
United Democratic Movement	121	0.32	0	90	0.23	0	0	New
African Christian Democratic Party	87	0.23	0	116	0.30	0	0	0
Pan Africanist Congress of Azania	61	0.16	0	63	0.16	0	0	0
Uniting People First	50	0.13	0	50	0.13	0	0	New
Power of Africans Unity	23	0.06	0	33	0.09	0	0	New
Total	37,988	100.00	21	38,662	100.00	21	42	–
Valid votes	37,988	98.54		38,662	98.18			
Invalid/blank votes	563	1.46		715	1.82			
Total votes	38,551	100.00		39,377	100.00			

== November 2021 election ==
The following table shows the results of the 2021 election.

Party	Ward			List			Total seats
Party	Votes	%	Seats	Votes	%	Seats	Total seats
African National Congress	12,612	34.23	15	12,860	34.71	1	16
Democratic Alliance	9,612	26.09	6	9,744	26.30	6	12
Economic Freedom Fighters	9,160	24.86	2	9,521	25.69	10	12
Freedom Front Plus	1,826	4.96	0	1,842	4.97	3	3
Independent candidates	1,178	3.20	0				0
African Independent Congress	588	1.60	0	526	1.42	1	1
Metsimaholo Community Association	418	1.13	0	492	1.33	1	1
African Transformation Movement	387	1.05	0	459	1.24	1	1
Agency for New Agenda	132	0.36	0	346	0.93	0	0
Batho Ba Qetile	189	0.51	0	180	0.49	0	0
African Christian Democratic Party	169	0.46	0	183	0.49	0	0
Pan Africanist Congress of Azania	166	0.45	0	163	0.44	0	0
Inkatha Freedom Party	90	0.24	0	206	0.56	0	0
Forum for Service Delivery	109	0.30	0	155	0.42	0	0
Metsimaholo Progressive People Forum	91	0.25	0	166	0.45	0	0
Africa Restoration Alliance	52	0.14	0	44	0.12	0	0
United Independent Movement	30	0.08	0	61	0.16	0	0
Congress of the People	13	0.04	0	66	0.18	0	0
Disability and Older Person Political Party	24	0.07	0	40	0.11	0	0
Total	36,846	100.00	23	37,054	100.00	23	46
Valid votes	36,846	98.33		37,054	98.66		
Invalid/blank votes	625	1.67		502	1.34		
Total votes	37,471	100.00		37,556	100.00		
Registered voters/turnout	81,379	46.05		81,379	46.15		

=== By-elections from November 2021 ===
The following by-elections were held to fill vacant ward seats in the period since November 2021.

Date	Ward	Party of the previous councillor	Party of the newly elected councillor
9 Jul 2025	14	Democratic Alliance	Democratic Alliance

== November 2026 election ==
The following table shows the results of the 2026 election. While Heilbron was merged with Metsimaholo, the number of wards were kept to 23.

Party	Ward			List			Total seats
Party	Votes	%	Seats	Votes	%	Seats	Total seats
African National Congress	15,237	27.58	17	15,296	27.75	0	17
Democratic Alliance	15,118	27.36	5	15,179	27.54	6	11
Economic Freedom Fighters	6,458	11.69	1	6,540	11.87	4	5
Service Movement for Metsimaholo	6,192	11.21	0	6,159	11.17	5	5
Freedom Front Plus	4,180	7.56	0	4,209	7.64	3	3
ActionSA	1,420	2.57	0	1,680	3.05	1	1
African Congress for Transformation	1,266	2.29	0	1,074	1.95	1	1
South African Communist Party	1,007	1.82	0	856	1.55	1	1
Metsimaholo Community Association	544	0.98	0	584	1.06	1	1
African Transformation Movement	426	0.77	0	456	0.83	1	1
African Independent Congress	367	0.66	0	472	0.86	0	0
Lentswe La Setjhaba	361	0.65	0	332	0.60	0	0
uMkhonto weSizwe Party	571	1.03	0				0
Pan Africanist Congress of Azania	248	0.45	0	253	0.46	0	0
Kingdom Ambassadors Movement	191	0.35	0	201	0.36	0	0
Metsimaholo Progressive People Forum	195	0.35	0	180	0.33	0	0
Progressive Civic Organisation	188	0.34	0	158	0.29	0	0
Patriotic Alliance	159	0.29	0	167	0.30	0	0
Afrika Mayibuye Movement	146	0.26	0	170	0.31	0	0
African Heart Congress	159	0.29	0	138	0.25	0	0
Fezile Dabi Civic Movement	143	0.26	0	144	0.26	0	0
Proudly Metsimaholo	132	0.24	0	113	0.21	0	0
Refengkgotso Civil Party	95	0.17	0	118	0.21	0	0
United Independent Movement	101	0.18	0	105	0.19	0	0
United Residents Front	81	0.15	0	85	0.15	0	0
African Christian Democratic Party	10	0.02	0	133	0.24	0	0
Inkatha Freedom Party	44	0.08	0	89	0.16	0	0
United Africans Transformation	5	0.01	0	119	0.22	0	0
Congress of the People	71	0.13	0	50	0.09	0	0
The Farmer Party	40	0.07	0	46	0.08	0	0
Civic Movement for Progressive Citizens	44	0.08	0				0
Tau Dia Rora Cultural and Traditional Lekgotla	36	0.07	0				0
Alternative African Allegiance	21	0.04	0	12	0.02	0	0
Total	55,256	100.00	23	55,118	100.00	23	46
Valid votes	55,256	98.20		55,118	98.16		
Invalid/blank votes	1,015	1.80		1,031	1.84		
Total votes	56,271	100.00		56,149	100.00		
Registered voters/turnout	109,208	51.53		109,208	51.41		
