= People's Revolutionary Movement (South Africa) =

Political party in South Africa

- President: Nhlanhla Buthelezi
- Spokesperson: Thembelani Ngubane
- Founded: 6 November 2016
- Split from: African National Congress
- Headquarters: Durban, KwaZulu-Natal
- Ideology: Social conservatism National conservatism Christian right Economic nationalism Anti-capitalism; Populism; Anti-LGBT
- Political position: Economics: Left-wing; Social: Right-wing
- Religion: Christianity
- Colours: Green Black
- National Assembly seats: 0 / 400
- Provincial Legislatures: 0 / 430

Website
- Facebook Official Page; Wordpress Official Page

The People's Revolutionary Movement (PRM) is a South African political party founded in November 2016 by former African National Congress councillor Nhlanhla Buthelezi in the KwaZulu-Natal province, and is known for its socially conservative views (particularly on LGBT rights).

The party contested the 2019 national and provincial elections, failing to win any seats.

== Election results ==
=== National elections ===
Election	Total votes	Share of vote	Seats	+/–	Government
2019	2,844	0.02%	0 / 400	–	extraparliamentary

=== Provincial elections ===
Election	Eastern Cape		Free State		Gauteng		Kwazulu-Natal		Limpopo		Mpumalanga		North-West		Northern Cape		Western Cape	
Election	%	Seats	%	Seats	%	Seats	%	Seats	%	Seats	%	Seats	%	Seats	%	Seats	%	Seats
2019	0.02%	0/63	-	-	-	-	0.07%	0/80	-	-	-	-	-	-	-	-	-	-
