= Ulundi Local Municipality elections =

Local elections in KwaZulu-Natal, South Africa

The Ulundi Local Municipality council consists of forty-nine members elected by mixed-member proportional representation. Twenty-five councillors are elected by first-past-the-post voting in twenty-five wards, while the remaining twenty-four are chosen from party lists so that the total number of party representatives is proportional to the number of votes received.

In the election of 4 November 2026 the Inkatha Freedom Party (IFP) retained its majority on the council, winning 36 seats.

== Results ==
The following table shows the composition of the council after past elections.

Event	ANC	DA	EFF	IFP	NFP	MKP	Other	Total
2000 election	1	0	—	45	—	—	1	47
2006 election	2	0	—	44	—	—	1	47
2011 election	6	0	—	28	13	—	0	47
2016 election	11	0	1	35	—	—	1	47
2021 election	5	1	2	32	7	—	0	47
2026 election	3	1	1	36	2	5	1	49

== December 2000 election ==
The following table shows the results of the 2000 election.

Party	Ward			List			Total seats
Party	Votes	%	Seats	Votes	%	Seats	Total seats
Inkatha Freedom Party	39,441	91.36	23	42,296	96.90	22	45
Independent candidates	2,594	6.01	1				1
African National Congress	665	1.54	0	828	1.90	1	1
Democratic Alliance	471	1.09	0	523	1.20	0	0
Total	43,171	100.00	24	43,647	100.00	23	47
Valid votes	43,171	97.31		43,647	98.50		
Invalid/blank votes	1,195	2.69		664	1.50		
Total votes	44,366	100.00		44,311	100.00		
Registered voters/turnout	74,929	59.21		74,929	59.14		

== March 2006 election ==
The following table shows the results of the 2006 election.

Party	Ward			List			Total seats
Party	Votes	%	Seats	Votes	%	Seats	Total seats
Inkatha Freedom Party	40,100	92.63	24	40,520	93.36	20	44
African National Congress	1,596	3.69	0	1,787	4.12	2	2
National Democratic Convention	841	1.94	0	722	1.66	1	1
Democratic Alliance	294	0.68	0	254	0.59	0	0
Independent candidates	458	1.06	0				0
Peace and Development Party	3	0.01	0	119	0.27	0	0
Total	43,292	100.00	24	43,402	100.00	23	47
Valid votes	43,292	98.63		43,402	98.86		
Invalid/blank votes	601	1.37		502	1.14		
Total votes	43,893	100.00		43,904	100.00		
Registered voters/turnout	75,086	58.46		75,086	58.47		

== May 2011 election ==
The following table shows the results of the 2011 election.

Party	Ward			List			Total seats
Party	Votes	%	Seats	Votes	%	Seats	Total seats
Inkatha Freedom Party	31,957	59.16	21	31,901	59.04	7	28
National Freedom Party	15,285	28.30	3	15,205	28.14	10	13
African National Congress	6,599	12.22	0	6,469	11.97	6	6
Democratic Alliance	66	0.12	0	299	0.55	0	0
African Christian Democratic Party	33	0.06	0	95	0.18	0	0
United Democratic Movement	16	0.03	0	61	0.11	0	0
Independent candidates	64	0.12	0				0
Total	54,020	100.00	24	54,030	100.00	23	47
Valid votes	54,020	99.03		54,030	98.96		
Invalid/blank votes	529	0.97		566	1.04		
Total votes	54,549	100.00		54,596	100.00		
Registered voters/turnout	83,874	65.04		83,874	65.09		

== August 2016 election ==
The following table shows the results of the 2016 election.

Party	Ward			List			Total seats
Party	Votes	%	Seats	Votes	%	Seats	Total seats
Inkatha Freedom Party	40,494	72.41	24	41,283	73.84	11	35
African National Congress	12,994	23.24	0	12,950	23.16	11	11
Economic Freedom Fighters	999	1.79	0	963	1.72	1	1
Democratic Alliance	550	0.98	0	521	0.93	0	0
Independent candidates	558	1.00	0				0
Academic Congress Union	325	0.58	0	192	0.34	0	0
Total	55,920	100.00	24	55,909	100.00	23	47
Valid votes	55,920	98.89		55,909	99.00		
Invalid/blank votes	627	1.11		562	1.00		
Total votes	56,547	100.00		56,471	100.00		
Registered voters/turnout	95,548	59.18		95,548	59.10		

== November 2021 election ==
The following table shows the results of the 2021 election.

Party	Ward			List			Total seats
Party	Votes	%	Seats	Votes	%	Seats	Total seats
Inkatha Freedom Party	29,621	63.28	24	31,729	67.76	8	32
National Freedom Party	6,988	14.93	0	7,134	15.23	7	7
African National Congress	5,329	11.39	0	5,145	10.99	5	5
Economic Freedom Fighters	2,034	4.35	0	2,023	4.32	2	2
Independent candidates	2,018	4.31	0				0
Democratic Alliance	462	0.99	0	469	1.00	1	1
African People's Movement	184	0.39	0	110	0.23	0	0
Academic Congress Union	63	0.13	0	47	0.10	0	0
African Christian Democratic Party	50	0.11	0	41	0.09	0	0
African Freedom Revolution	16	0.03	0	48	0.10	0	0
Abantu Batho Congress	24	0.05	0	27	0.06	0	0
African Security Congress	6	0.01	0	40	0.09	0	0
African Transformation Movement	12	0.03	0	14	0.03	0	0
Total	46,807	100.00	24	46,827	100.00	23	47
Valid votes	46,807	98.59		46,827	98.53		
Invalid/blank votes	671	1.41		697	1.47		
Total votes	47,478	100.00		47,524	100.00		
Registered voters/turnout	94,019	50.50		94,019	50.55		

== November 2026 election ==
The following table shows the results of the 2026 election.

Party	Ward			List			Total seats
Party	Votes	%	Seats	Votes	%	Seats	Total seats
Inkatha Freedom Party	35,101	72.46	25	35,229	72.87	11	36
uMkhonto weSizwe Party	4,828	9.97	0	4,995	10.33	5	5
African National Congress	3,409	7.04	0	3,235	6.69	3	3
National Freedom Party	1,727	3.57	0	1,690	3.50	2	2
Economic Freedom Fighters	1,180	2.44	0	1,061	2.19	1	1
National Peoples Ambassadors	1,076	2.22	0	907	1.88	1	1
Democratic Alliance	399	0.82	0	429	0.89	1	1
African Transformation Movement	120	0.25	0	150	0.31	0	0
African People's Convention	133	0.27	0	132	0.27	0	0
National People's Front	138	0.28	0	108	0.22	0	0
Independent Alliance	100	0.21	0	125	0.26	0	0
Afrika Mayibuye Movement	95	0.20	0	102	0.21	0	0
South African Communist Party	58	0.12	0	78	0.16	0	0
Umkhumbi Wesizwe Organisation	58	0.12	0	70	0.14	0	0
Gods Justice and Development Party	19	0.04	0	33	0.07	0	0
Total	48,441	100.00	25	48,344	100.00	24	49
Valid votes	48,441	98.93		48,344	98.90		
Invalid/blank votes	525	1.07		537	1.10		
Total votes	48,966	100.00		48,881	100.00		
Registered voters/turnout	103,674	47.23		103,674	47.15		
