= New South Africa Party =

South African political party

- Suzette Jansen
- Founder: Suzette Jansen
- National Assembly seats: 0 / 400
- Provincial Legislatures: 0 / 430

Website
- www.newsaparty.co.za

New South Africa Party is a minor political party in South Africa.

The party aims to introduce what it calls a "sober service grant", replacing child grants. The grant would be available to all that are unemployed or earn less than R2000 a month, and to be eligible, recipients would need to be free from gangsterism, alcohol and other drugs, and render 20 hours of monthly community service.

The party contested the 2019 South African general election at the provincial level in Western Cape only, failing to win a seat.

== Election results ==
=== Provincial elections ===
Election	Eastern Cape		Free State		Gauteng		Kwazulu-Natal		Limpopo		Mpumalanga		North-West		Northern Cape		Western Cape	
Election	%	Seats	%	Seats	%	Seats	%	Seats	%	Seats	%	Seats	%	Seats	%	Seats	%	Seats
2019	-	-	-	-	-	-	-	-	-	-	-	-	-	-	-	-	0.02%	0/42
