= Umzumbe Local Municipality elections =

Local elections in KwaZulu-Natal, South Africa

The Umzumbe Local Municipality council consists of thirty-nine members elected by mixed-member proportional representation. Twenty councillors are elected by first-past-the-post voting in twenty wards, while the remaining nineteen are chosen from party lists so that the total number of party representatives is proportional to the number of votes received.

In the election of 4 November 2026, no party won a majority. The Inkatha Freedom Party won the largest number of seats on the council.

== Results ==
The following table shows the composition of the council after past elections.

Event	ANC	DA	EFF	IFP	MKP	Other	Total
2000 election	12	2	—	23	—	0	37
2006 election	20	1	—	16	—	0	37
2011 election	26	1	—	2	—	9	38
2016 election	30	1	1	6	—	1	39
2021 election	21	0	2	14	—	2	39
2026 election	11	0	0	16	10	2	39

== December 2000 election ==
The following table shows the results of the 2000 election.

Party	Ward			List			Total seats
Party	Votes	%	Seats	Votes	%	Seats	Total seats
Inkatha Freedom Party	18,737	60.56	18	18,956	61.13	5	23
African National Congress	10,348	33.44	1	10,364	33.42	11	12
Democratic Alliance	1,654	5.35	0	1,688	5.44	2	2
Independent candidates	203	0.66	0				0
Total	30,942	100.00	19	31,008	100.00	18	37
Valid votes	30,942	96.90		31,008	97.29		
Invalid/blank votes	990	3.10		865	2.71		
Total votes	31,932	100.00		31,873	100.00		
Registered voters/turnout	64,479	49.52		64,479	49.43		

== March 2006 election ==
The following table shows the results of the 2006 election.

Party	Ward			List			Total seats
Party	Votes	%	Seats	Votes	%	Seats	Total seats
African National Congress	19,191	54.70	14	19,595	55.86	6	20
Inkatha Freedom Party	14,733	42.00	5	14,648	41.76	11	16
Democratic Alliance	661	1.88	0	834	2.38	1	1
Independent candidates	497	1.42	0				0
Total	35,082	100.00	19	35,077	100.00	18	37
Valid votes	35,082	97.39		35,077	97.29		
Invalid/blank votes	942	2.61		978	2.71		
Total votes	36,024	100.00		36,055	100.00		
Registered voters/turnout	68,248	52.78		68,248	52.83		

== May 2011 election ==
The following table shows the results of the 2011 election.

Party	Ward			List			Total seats
Party	Votes	%	Seats	Votes	%	Seats	Total seats
African National Congress	29,210	70.26	18	29,802	68.53	8	26
National Freedom Party	9,412	22.64	0	7,442	17.11	8	8
Inkatha Freedom Party				4,605	10.59	2	2
Democratic Alliance	815	1.96	0	579	1.33	1	1
Independent candidates	1,110	2.67	1				1
African People's Convention	474	1.14	0	472	1.09	0	0
Congress of the People	434	1.04	0	405	0.93	0	0
African Christian Democratic Party	119	0.29	0	180	0.41	0	0
Total	41,574	100.00	19	43,485	100.00	19	38
Valid votes	41,574	93.45		43,485	97.10		
Invalid/blank votes	2,912	6.55		1,299	2.90		
Total votes	44,486	100.00		44,784	100.00		
Registered voters/turnout	73,021	60.92		73,021	61.33		

== August 2016 election ==
The following table shows the results of the 2016 election.

Party	Ward			List			Total seats
Party	Votes	%	Seats	Votes	%	Seats	Total seats
African National Congress	32,816	74.87	20	33,309	76.27	10	30
Inkatha Freedom Party	7,500	17.11	0	7,097	16.25	6	6
Economic Freedom Fighters	1,415	3.23	0	1,584	3.63	1	1
Democratic Alliance	685	1.56	0	661	1.51	1	1
African People's Convention	587	1.34	0	628	1.44	1	1
Strength of Humanity	320	0.73	0	392	0.90	0	0
Independent candidates	509	1.16	0				0
Total	43,832	100.00	20	43,671	100.00	19	39
Valid votes	43,832	97.24		43,671	97.14		
Invalid/blank votes	1,244	2.76		1,284	2.86		
Total votes	45,076	100.00		44,955	100.00		
Registered voters/turnout	78,227	57.62		78,227	57.47		

== November 2021 election ==
The following table shows the results of the 2021 election.

Party	Ward			List			Total seats
Party	Votes	%	Seats	Votes	%	Seats	Total seats
African National Congress	20,335	53.10	15	20,544	53.48	6	21
Inkatha Freedom Party	12,875	33.62	5	13,134	34.19	9	14
Economic Freedom Fighters	2,040	5.33	0	2,095	5.45	2	2
African People's Movement	1,316	3.44	0	1,096	2.85	1	1
African Transformation Movement	256	0.67	0	266	0.69	1	1
Democratic Alliance	237	0.62	0	238	0.62	0	0
African People's Convention	195	0.51	0	260	0.68	0	0
National Freedom Party	133	0.35	0	266	0.69	0	0
Independent candidates	335	0.87	0				0
National Religious Freedom Party	127	0.33	0	112	0.29	0	0
United Democratic Movement	126	0.33	0	100	0.26	0	0
African Christian Democratic Party	112	0.29	0	113	0.29	0	0
Abantu Batho Congress	120	0.31	0	103	0.27	0	0
Democratic People's Congress	91	0.24	0	89	0.23	0	0
Total	38,298	100.00	20	38,416	100.00	19	39
Valid votes	38,298	97.92		38,416	98.03		
Invalid/blank votes	815	2.08		771	1.97		
Total votes	39,113	100.00		39,187	100.00		
Registered voters/turnout	76,706	50.99		76,706	51.09		

=== By-elections from November 2021 ===
The following by-elections were held to fill vacant ward seats in the period since the election in November 2021.

Date	Ward	Party of the previous councillor	Party of the newly elected councillor
19 Jun 2024	1	African National Congress	African National Congress
19 Jun 2024	2	African National Congress	Inkatha Freedom Party
19 Jun 2024	3	African National Congress	African National Congress
19 Jun 2024	4	African National Congress	Inkatha Freedom Party
19 Jun 2024	11	African National Congress	uMkhonto weSizwe
19 Jun 2024	19	African National Congress	Inkatha Freedom Party
11 Feb 2026	13	Inkatha Freedom Party	Inkatha Freedom Party

== November 2026 election ==
The following table shows the results of the 2026 election.

Party	Ward			List			Total seats
Party	Votes	%	Seats	Votes	%	Seats	Total seats
Inkatha Freedom Party	18,613	41.16	16	18,674	41.53	0	16
African National Congress	12,163	26.90	2	11,896	26.45	9	11
uMkhonto weSizwe Party	11,212	24.80	2	11,506	25.59	8	10
National Freedom Party	489	1.08	0	706	1.57	1	1
African Transformation Movement	595	1.32	0	593	1.32	1	1
Democratic Alliance	458	1.01	0	476	1.06	0	0
Economic Freedom Fighters	350	0.77	0	385	0.86	0	0
Independent candidates	597	1.32	0				0
Justice and Employment Party	215	0.48	0	138	0.31	0	0
Freedom Front Plus	169	0.37	0	155	0.34	0	0
Afrika Mayibuye Movement	123	0.27	0	121	0.27	0	0
Pan Africanist Congress of Azania	85	0.19	0	142	0.32	0	0
South African Communist Party	76	0.17	0	49	0.11	0	0
All Natives of South Africa	68	0.15	0	46	0.10	0	0
African Renaissance Unity	4	0.01	0	81	0.18	0	0
Total	45,217	100.00	20	44,968	100.00	19	39
Valid votes	45,217	98.26		44,968	98.10		
Invalid/blank votes	799	1.74		872	1.90		
Total votes	46,016	100.00		45,840	100.00		
Registered voters/turnout	84,631	54.37		84,631	54.16		
