= Ray Nkonyeni Local Municipality elections =

Local elections in KwaZulu-Natal, South Africa

The Ray Nkonyeni Local Municipality council consists of seventy-one members elected by mixed-member proportional representation. Thirty-six councillors are elected by first-past-the-post voting in thirty-six wards, while the remaining thirty-five are chosen from party lists so that the total number of party representatives is proportional to the number of votes received.

In the election of 4 November 2026 the African National Congress (ANC) lost its majority. No party gained a majority, with the uMkhonto weSizwe Party winning the largest number of seats on the council, 24.

== Results ==
The following table shows the composition of the council after past elections.

Event	ACDP	AIC	ANC	DA	EFF	FF+	IFP	MKP	Other	Total
2000 election	1	—	28	13	—	—	16	—	0	58
2006 election	1	—	39	7	—	1	9	—	1	58
2011 election	0	—	41	11	—	0	3	—	3	58
2016 election	—	2	47	14	2	1	5	—	0	71
2021 election	1	1	37	14	7	1	8	—	2	71
2026 election	1	1	21	13	2	2	6	24	1	71

== December 2000 election ==
The following table shows the results of the 2006 election.

Party	Ward			List			Total seats
Party	Votes	%	Seats	Votes	%	Seats	Total seats
African National Congress	21,099	47.80	16	21,016	47.59	12	28
Inkatha Freedom Party	12,194	27.62	6	12,012	27.20	10	16
Democratic Alliance	9,325	21.12	7	9,996	22.64	6	13
African Christian Democratic Party	1,134	2.57	0	1,135	2.57	1	1
Independent candidates	392	0.89	0				0
Total	44,144	100.00	29	44,159	100.00	29	58
Valid votes	44,144	97.50		44,159	97.33		
Invalid/blank votes	1,130	2.50		1,211	2.67		
Total votes	45,274	100.00		45,370	100.00		
Registered voters/turnout	95,504	47.41		95,504	47.51		

== March 2006 election ==
The following table shows the results of the 2006 election.

Party	Ward			List			Total seats
Party	Votes	%	Seats	Votes	%	Seats	Total seats
African National Congress	36,049	66.47	23	36,565	67.39	16	39
Inkatha Freedom Party	8,688	16.02	1	8,663	15.97	8	9
Democratic Alliance	6,742	12.43	5	6,789	12.51	2	7
African Christian Democratic Party	851	1.57	0	821	1.51	1	1
Freedom Front Plus	442	0.82	0	667	1.23	1	1
Minority Front	497	0.92	0	587	1.08	1	1
Independent candidates	903	1.67	0				0
Independent Heritage South Party	13	0.02	0	165	0.30	0	0
National Democratic Convention	46	0.08	0				0
Total	54,231	100.00	29	54,257	100.00	29	58
Valid votes	54,231	98.15		54,257	98.06		
Invalid/blank votes	1,020	1.85		1,071	1.94		
Total votes	55,251	100.00		55,328	100.00		
Registered voters/turnout	105,589	52.33		105,589	52.40		

== May 2011 election ==
The following table shows the results of the 2011 election.

Party	Ward			List			Total seats
Party	Votes	%	Seats	Votes	%	Seats	Total seats
African National Congress	54,658	69.93	21	55,515	70.52	20	41
Democratic Alliance	14,580	18.65	8	14,769	18.76	3	11
Inkatha Freedom Party	4,526	5.79	0	4,539	5.77	3	3
National Freedom Party	2,347	3.00	0	2,189	2.78	2	2
Congress of the People	608	0.78	0	615	0.78	1	1
African Christian Democratic Party	375	0.48	0	442	0.56	0	0
Freedom Front Plus	356	0.46	0	311	0.40	0	0
Minority Front	217	0.28	0	197	0.25	0	0
United Democratic Movement	219	0.28	0	140	0.18	0	0
Independent candidates	278	0.36	0				0
Total	78,164	100.00	29	78,717	100.00	29	58
Valid votes	78,164	98.41		78,717	98.75		
Invalid/blank votes	1,263	1.59		1,000	1.25		
Total votes	79,427	100.00		79,717	100.00		
Registered voters/turnout	124,629	63.73		124,629	63.96		

== August 2016 election ==
The following table shows the results of the 2016 election.

Party	Ward			List			Total seats
Party	Votes	%	Seats	Votes	%	Seats	Total seats
African National Congress	68,387	66.73	27	67,021	65.83	20	47
Democratic Alliance	20,082	19.60	9	20,075	19.72	5	14
Inkatha Freedom Party	7,850	7.66	0	7,431	7.30	5	5
Economic Freedom Fighters	3,380	3.30	0	3,335	3.28	2	2
African Independent Congress	797	0.78	0	3,216	3.16	2	2
Independent candidates	1,359	1.33	0				0
Freedom Front Plus	623	0.61	0	729	0.72	1	1
Total	102,478	100.00	36	101,807	100.00	35	71
Valid votes	102,478	98.14		101,807	97.91		
Invalid/blank votes	1,937	1.86		2,171	2.09		
Total votes	104,415	100.00		103,978	100.00		
Registered voters/turnout	170,849	61.12		170,849	60.86		

== November 2021 election ==
The following table shows the results of the 2021 election.

Party	Ward			List			Total seats
Party	Votes	%	Seats	Votes	%	Seats	Total seats
African National Congress	41,660	51.92	25	41,279	51.63	12	37
Democratic Alliance	15,895	19.81	10	15,783	19.74	4	14
Inkatha Freedom Party	8,912	11.11	1	9,017	11.28	7	8
Economic Freedom Fighters	7,843	9.78	0	8,137	10.18	7	7
Freedom Front Plus	1,254	1.56	0	1,144	1.43	1	1
Independent candidates	1,772	2.21	0				0
African Independent Congress				1,307	1.63	1	1
African Christian Democratic Party	616	0.77	0	653	0.82	1	1
Justice and Employment Party	454	0.57	0	576	0.72	1	1
African Transformation Movement	467	0.58	0	546	0.68	1	1
People's Freedom Party	358	0.45	0	329	0.41	0	0
Abantu Batho Congress	313	0.39	0	295	0.37	0	0
United Democratic Movement	164	0.20	0	198	0.25	0	0
National Freedom Party	166	0.21	0	168	0.21	0	0
Spectrum National Party	147	0.18	0	109	0.14	0	0
The Organic Humanity Movement	135	0.17	0	93	0.12	0	0
African People's Movement	52	0.06	0	108	0.14	0	0
United Independent Movement	23	0.03	0	111	0.14	0	0
National Religious Freedom Party				55	0.07	0	0
Patriotic Alliance	4	0.00	0	48	0.06	0	0
Total	80,235	100.00	36	79,956	100.00	35	71
Valid votes	80,235	98.30		79,956	98.00		
Invalid/blank votes	1,390	1.70		1,632	2.00		
Total votes	81,625	100.00		81,588	100.00		
Registered voters/turnout	170,946	47.75		170,946	47.73		

=== By-elections from November 2021 ===
The following by-elections were held to fill vacant ward seats in the period since the election in November 2021.

Date	Ward	Party of the previous councillor	Party of the newly elected councillor
8 Mar 2023	24	African National Congress	African National Congress
13 Dec 2023	23	African National Congress	African National Congress
11 Sep 2024	14	African National Congress	uMkhonto weSizwe
11 Sep 2024	24	African National Congress	African National Congress

== November 2026 election ==
The following table shows the results of the 2026 election.

Party	Ward			List			Total seats
Party	Votes	%	Seats	Votes	%	Seats	Total seats
uMkhonto weSizwe Party	35,254	33.32	16	36,375	34.53	8	24
African National Congress	32,011	30.25	9	31,006	29.43	12	21
Democratic Alliance	17,367	16.41	10	18,262	17.34	3	13
Inkatha Freedom Party	9,573	9.05	1	9,436	8.96	5	6
Freedom Front Plus	2,469	2.33	0	2,679	2.54	2	2
Economic Freedom Fighters	2,398	2.27	0	2,474	2.35	2	2
African Transformation Movement	1,312	1.24	0	1,359	1.29	1	1
African Independent Congress	761	0.72	0	916	0.87	1	1
Independent candidates	1,513	1.43	0				0
African Christian Democratic Party	642	0.61	0	643	0.61	1	1
Afrika Mayibuye Movement	350	0.33	0	345	0.33	0	0
South African Communist Party	348	0.33	0	306	0.29	0	0
Patriotic Alliance	312	0.29	0	288	0.27	0	0
Alliance for A New South Africa	292	0.28	0	235	0.22	0	0
African Movement Congress	207	0.20	0	189	0.18	0	0
National Freedom Party	210	0.20	0	179	0.17	0	0
African Renaissance Unity	125	0.12	0	170	0.16	0	0
Justice and Employment Party	168	0.16	0	114	0.11	0	0
Afro Natives	137	0.13	0	105	0.10	0	0
Arusha Economic Coalition	130	0.12	0	90	0.09	0	0
Pan Africanist Congress of Azania	101	0.10	0	88	0.08	0	0
Active Citizens Coalition	68	0.06	0	60	0.06	0	0
All Natives of South Africa	62	0.06	0	26	0.02	0	0
Total	105,810	100.00	36	105,345	100.00	35	71
Valid votes	105,810	98.47		105,345	98.45		
Invalid/blank votes	1,639	1.53		1,663	1.55		
Total votes	107,449	100.00		107,008	100.00		
Registered voters/turnout	201,141	53.42		201,141	53.20		
