= South African National Congress of Traditional Authorities =

Political party in South Africa

- President: Chief Mantjolo Mnisi
- Founded: February 2019
- Split from: African National Congress
- National Assembly seats: 0 / 400
- Provincial Legislatures: 0 / 430

The South African National Congress of Traditional Authorities (Sancota) is a South African political party formed in February 2019.

The party is in alliance with Practical Radical Economic Transformation of SA (PretSA), formed by party member Themba Sigudla. PretSA was previously closely linked with African National Congress deputy president David Mabuza and highly influential in Mpumalanga politics. Rifts within the Mpumalanga ANC around the increasing influence of PretSA are believed to have contributed to Sancota's founding.

Sancota is supportive of the interests of traditional leaders, and has come out in support of abaThembu King Buyelekhaya Dalindyebo, who was convicted of assault, arson, kidnapping and defeating the ends of justice, stating that "it serves a bad precedent for a king to serve jail time".

The party also believes that electricity utility Eskom should drop all of its debt to municipalities.

Sancota attracted support in the Bushbuckridge area, with at least one councillor defecting to the new party shortly after its formation.

The party contested the 2019 general election, failing to win any seats.

== National elections ==
| Election | Total votes | Share of vote | Seats | +/– | Government |
|---|---|---|---|---|---|
| 2019 | 3,714 | 0.02% | 0 / 400 | – | extraparliamentary |

== Provincial elections ==
| Election | Eastern Cape | | Free State | | Gauteng | | Kwazulu-Natal | | Limpopo | | Mpumalanga | | North-West | | Northern Cape | | Western Cape | |
| Election | % | Seats | % | Seats | % | Seats | % | Seats | % | Seats | % | Seats | % | Seats | % | Seats | % | Seats |
|---|---|---|---|---|---|---|---|---|---|---|---|---|---|---|---|---|---|---|
| 2019 | - | - | 0.01% | 0/30 | 0.01% | 0/73 | - | - | 0.01% | 0/49 | 0.24% | 0/30 | - | - | - | - | - | - |
