= Afrikan Alliance of Social Democrats =

Political party from South Africa

- Pappie Mokoena
- Split from: African National Congress
- Ideology: Social democracy Pan-africanism
- Political position: Centre-left
- National Assembly seats: 0 / 400
- Provincial Legislatures: 0 / 430

Website
- afrikanallianceofsocialdemocrats.com

The Afrikan Alliance of Social Democrats (AASD) is a South African political party led by Pappie Mokoena, former African National Congress (ANC) mayor of Mangaung.

The party describes itself as "a modern Pan Afrikan Social democratic party that subscribes to the notion of a fair and just political order based on Effective Citizen Participatory Democracy", and aims to reconnect the community with the constitution and improve the quality of state services.

Mokoena was acquitted of theft and money-laundering charges in 2011, and reportedly heads Bloemfontein Correctional Contracts, a company running Mangaung prison, a facility accused of being “marred by irregularities and allegations of abuse and torture”.

The party contested the 2019 general election, failing to win a seat. The party intended to contest the 2024 general election but failed to submit its lists in time and failed in urgent court bid to gain late access.

== Election results ==
=== National Assembly ===
Election	Total votes	Share of vote	Seats	+/–	Government
2019	18,834	0.11	0 / 400	–	extraparliamentary

=== Provincial elections ===
Election	Eastern Cape		Free State		Gauteng		Kwazulu-Natal		Limpopo		Mpumalanga		North-West		Northern Cape		Western Cape	
Election	%	Seats	%	Seats	%	Seats	%	Seats	%	Seats	%	Seats	%	Seats	%	Seats	%	Seats
2019	-	-	0.19%	0/30	-	-	-	-	-	-	-	-	-	-	0.09%	0/30	-	-
