= African Renaissance Unity Party =

Political party from South Africa

- Founder: Bryce Mthimkhulu
- Founded: 2018
- National Assembly seats: 0 / 400
- Provincial Legislatures: 0 / 430

Website
- www.facebook.com/AfricanRenaissanceUnity/

The African Renaissance Unity Party (ARU) is a South African political party founded to lobby for the interests of traditional chiefs and their communities. The party's leaders are all traditional chiefs.

At its launch, the party promised to reduce unemployment by 70%, double pensions and provide free tertiary education.

== Controversy ==
Party leader Bryce Mthimkhulu, who describes himself as King Mthimkhulu III and king of the amaHlubi nation in KwaZulu-Natal, was warned by then president Jacob Zuma in 2016 to stop using the term, and was taken to court by the government (which lost the case).

== Election results ==
The party contested the 2019 general election at the national level, and provincial level in the Free State, Kwazulu-Natal and Limpopo, failing to win any seats.

=== National elections ===
Election	Total votes	Share of vote	Seats	+/–	Government
2019	3,860	0.02%	0 / 400	–	extraparliamentary

=== Provincial elections ===
Election	Eastern Cape		Free State		Gauteng		Kwazulu-Natal		Limpopo		Mpumalanga		North-West		Northern Cape		Western Cape	
Election	%	Seats	%	Seats	%	Seats	%	Seats	%	Seats	%	Seats	%	Seats	%	Seats	%	Seats
2019	-	-	0.02%	0/30	-	-	0.04%	0/80	0.03%	0/49	-	-	-	-	-	-	-	-
