= African Change Academy =

Political party in South Africa

- Founder: Wandile Tsipa
- Founded: 2017
- Split from: United Democratic Movement
- National Assembly seats: 0 / 400
- Provincial Legislatures: 0 / 430

African Change Academy (ACA) is a minor political party in South Africa.

The party was founded by United Democratic Movement founder member Wandile Tsipa, who was expelled from the UDM after being accused of using that party's resources to start his new party.

ACA advocates for the return of the death-penalty, with Tsipa stating that "the only people against the death sentence are those who do criminal activities."

In November 2017, the party called for the dismissal of the Minister of State Security, Bongani Bongo, accused of involved in a bribery scandal, by then president Jacob Zuma.

The party contested the 2019 South African general election at provincial level in the Eastern Cape only, failing to win a seat.

== Election results ==
=== Provincial elections ===
Election	Eastern Cape		Free State		Gauteng		Kwazulu-Natal		Limpopo		Mpumalanga		North-West		Northern Cape		Western Cape	
Election	%	Seats	%	Seats	%	Seats	%	Seats	%	Seats	%	Seats	%	Seats	%	Seats	%	Seats
2019	0.03%	0/63	-	-	-	-	-	-	-	-	-	-	-	-	-	-	-	-
