= African Congress of Democrats =

Political party from South Africa

- Ideology: Social democracy Social justice
- National Assembly seats: 0 / 400
- Provincial Legislatures: 0 / 430

Website
- acd.org.za

The African Congress of Democrats (ACD) is a South African political party.

The party describes itself as being committed to leadership that is honest, has integrity, in accordance with the principles and ideals of a moderate left, and working within the established system to improve social justice.

The party contested the 2019 general election, failing to win a seat.

== Election results ==
=== National Assembly ===
Election	Total votes	Share of vote	Seats	+/–	Government
2019	3,768	0.02	0 / 400	–	extraparliamentary

=== Provincial elections ===
Election	Eastern Cape		Free State		Gauteng		Kwazulu-Natal		Limpopo		Mpumalanga		North-West		Northern Cape		Western Cape	
Election	%	Seats	%	Seats	%	Seats	%	Seats	%	Seats	%	Seats	%	Seats	%	Seats	%	Seats
2019	-	-	0.06%	0/30	-	-	-	-	-	-	-	-	-	-	-	-	-	-
