= 2019 South African general election =

- 8 May 2019

All 400 seats in the National Assembly 201 seats needed for a majority
- Registered: 26,756,649
- Turnout: 66.05% (▼7.43pp)
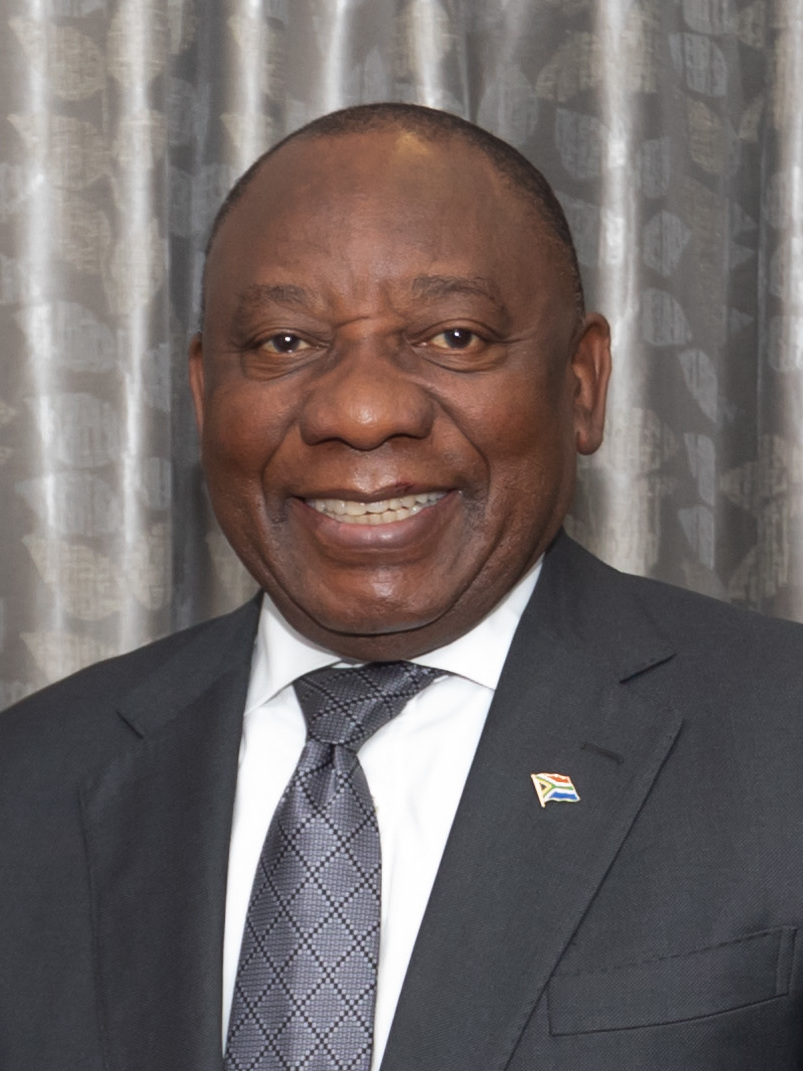

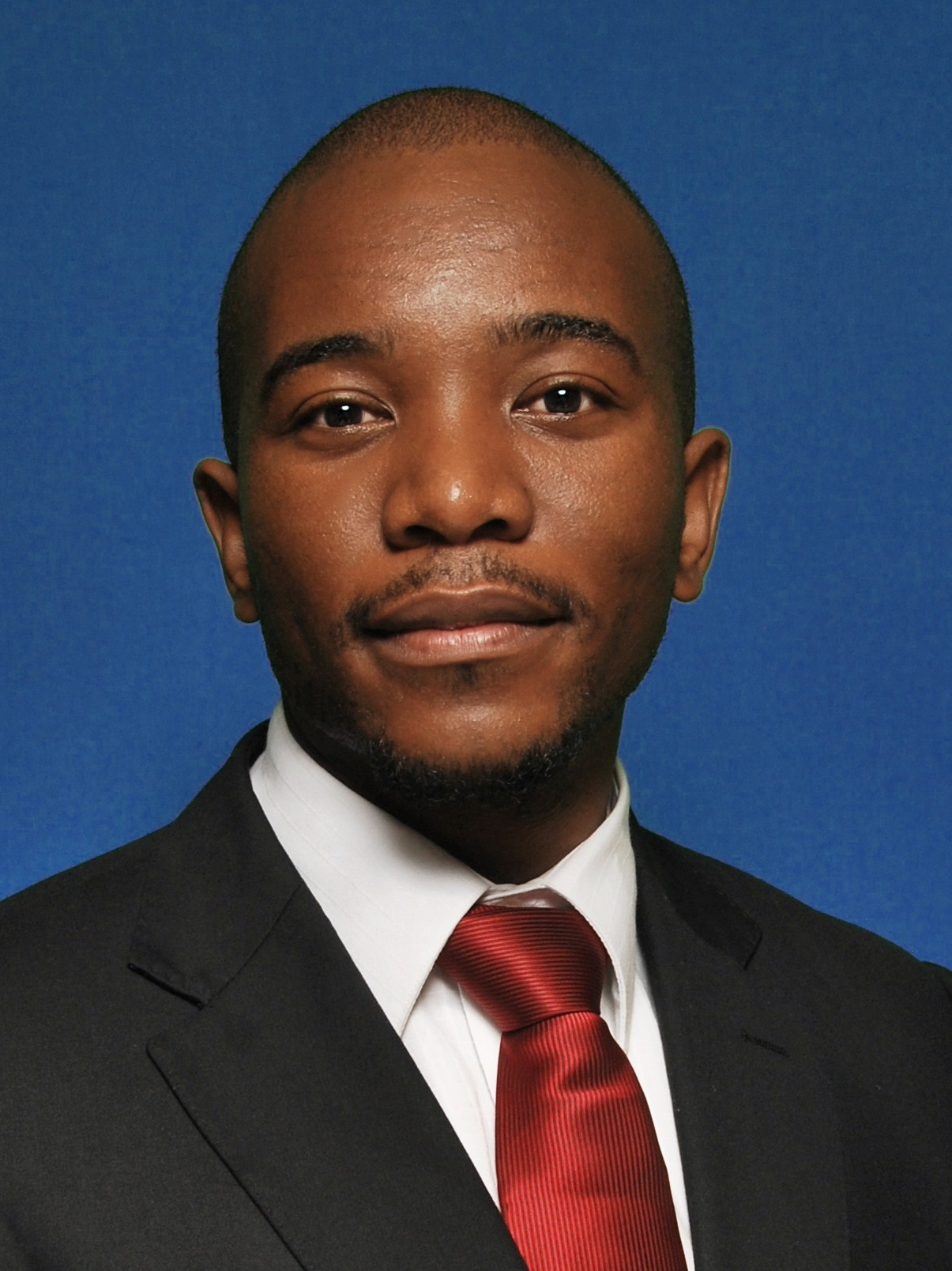

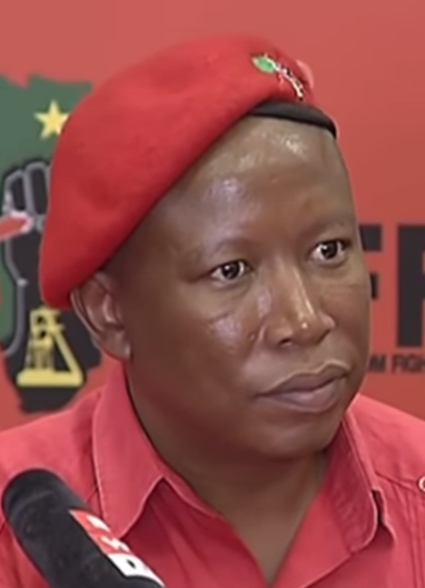

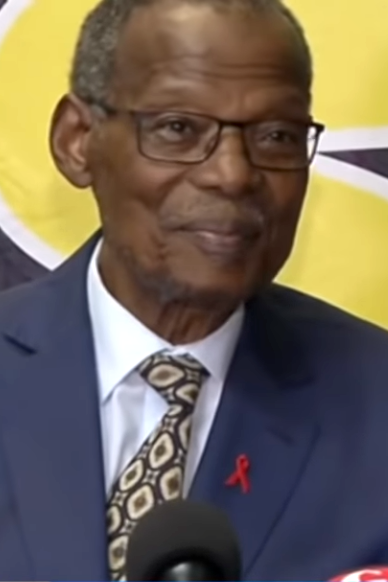

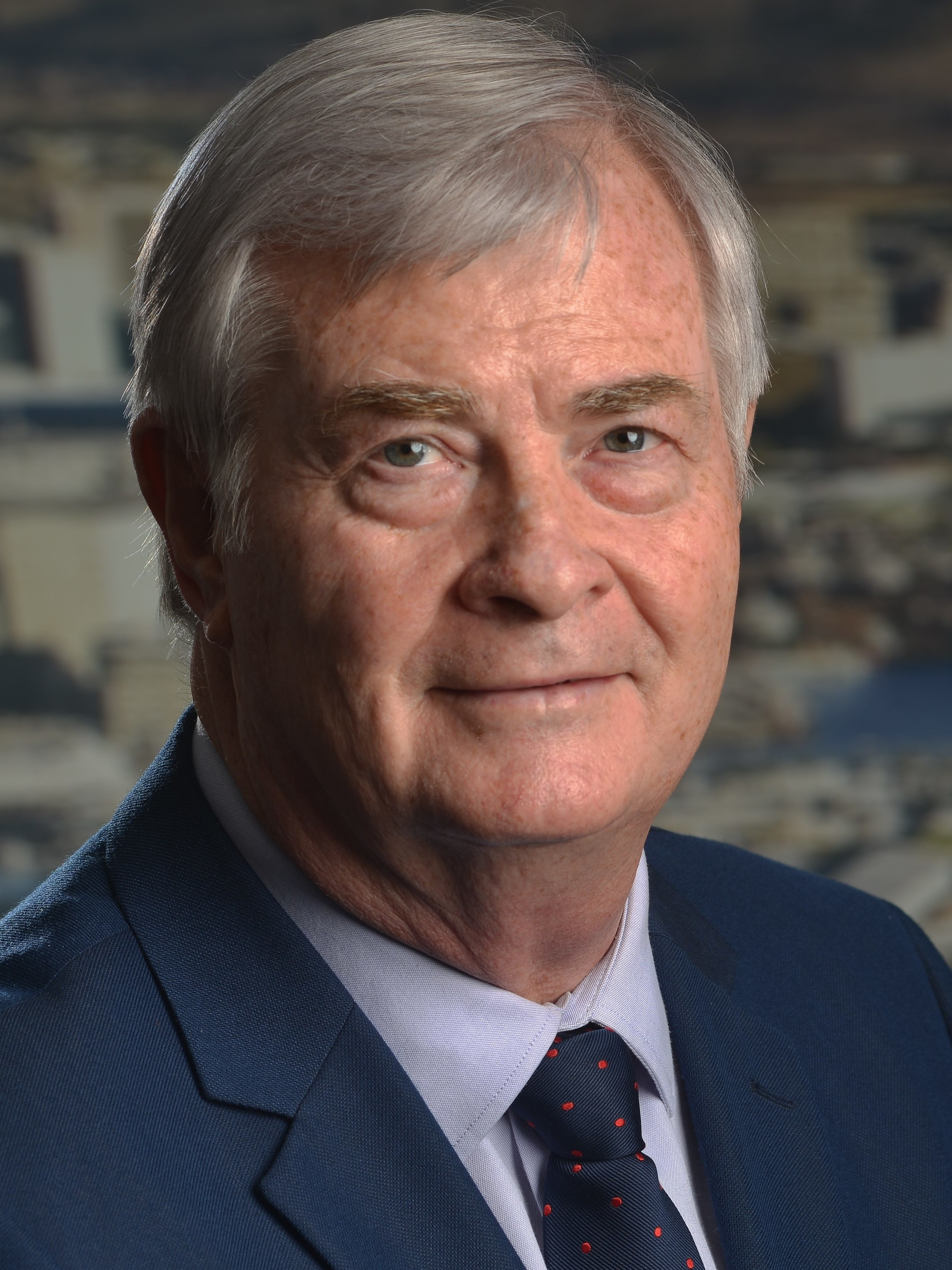

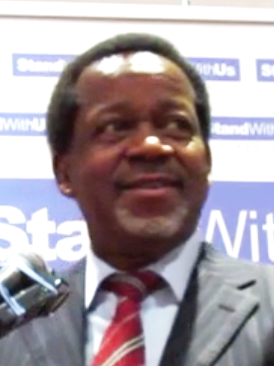
	First party	Second party	Third party
Leader	Cyril Ramaphosa	Mmusi Maimane	Julius Malema
Party	ANC	DA	EFF
Last election	62.15%, 249 seats	22.23%, 89 seats	6.35%, 25 seats
Seats won	230	84	44
Seat change	▼19	▼5	▲19
Popular vote	10,026,475	3,622,531	1,882,480
Percentage	57.50%	20.77%	10.80%
Swing	▼4.65pp	▼1.46pp	▲4.45pp
	Fourth party	Fifth party	Sixth party
Leader	Mangosuthu Buthelezi	Pieter Groenewald	Kenneth Meshoe
Party	IFP	VF+	ACDP
Last election	2.40%, 10 seats	0.90%, 4 seats	0.57%, 3 seats
Seats won	14	10	4
Seat change	▲4	▲6	▲1
Popular vote	588,839	414,864	146,262
Percentage	3.38%	2.38%	0.84%
Swing	▲0.98pp	▲1.48pp	▲0.27pp
President before election
Cyril Ramaphosa
ANC
Elected President
Cyril Ramaphosa
ANC

General elections were held in South Africa on 8 May 2019 to elect a new President, National Assembly and provincial legislatures in each province. These were the sixth elections held since the end of apartheid in 1994 and determined who would become the next President of South Africa.

Incumbent President Cyril Ramaphosa led the ruling African National Congress, with the party attempting to retain its majority status and secure Ramaphosa a full term in office as president; his predecessor, Jacob Zuma, resigned from office on 14 February 2018. Zuma was already ineligible for a third term in office as the South African Constitution limits a president to serve a maximum of two five-year terms.

The National Assembly election was won by the ruling African National Congress (ANC), but with a reduced majority of 57.50%, down from 62.15% in the 2014 election. This was the ANC's lowest vote share since the introduction of non-racial democratic elections in 1994. The official opposition Democratic Alliance (DA) also saw its proportion of the vote decline, from 22.23% to 20.77%, while the Economic Freedom Fighters (EFF) significantly grew their vote share, from 6.35% to 10.80%. The Inkatha Freedom Party (IFP) grew from 2.40% to 3.38%; this was the first time the party's vote share increased since 1994. The Freedom Front Plus (VF+) also grew from 0.9% to 2.38%, achieving its largest vote share since its founding.

Eight of the nine provincial legislatures were won by the ANC, though it lost its two-thirds majority in the National Council of Provinces for the first time since 1994. The EFF retained its position as official opposition in Limpopo and the North West, while simultaneously beating the Democratic Alliance to second place in Mpumalanga. The DA obtained second place in four provinces won by the ANC. In KwaZulu-Natal, the Inkatha Freedom Party beat the DA to second place for the first time since 2014. In the Western Cape, the only province not won by the ANC, the DA declined from 59.38% to 55.45%.

== Electoral system ==
South Africa has a parliamentary system of government; the National Assembly consists of 400 members elected by closed list proportional representation. Two hundred members are elected from national party lists; the other 200 are elected from provincial party lists in each of the nine provinces. The 200 provincial seats are divided among the provinces based on population, ranging from 5 seats in the Northern Cape to 48 seats in Gauteng, as of this election. The largest remainder method and the Droop quota are used to allocate seats at both the provincial and national level. All 400 seats are first allocated to parties at the national level, then the 200 provincial seats are allocated to parties in each of the nine provinces. Finally, the national list seats are allocated to the parties by subtracting seats won at the provincial level for each party from that party's national allocation, generating a maximally proportional result. A provision in the electoral law limits the number of seats allocated in the highest remainder stage of the national allocation to 5, with any remaining unallocated seats distributed according to the highest average of votes per seat. The president of South Africa is elected by the National Assembly after the election.

The provincial legislatures, which vary in size from 30 to 80 members, are also elected by proportional representation with closed lists, using the same method as the provincial allocation in the national election. The premiers of each province are elected by the respective provincial legislatures.

The National Council of Provinces (NCOP) consists of 90 members, ten elected by each provincial legislature. The NCOP members are elected by the provincial legislatures in proportion to the party makeup of the legislatures.

== Date of election ==
The term of the National Assembly is five years. The previous general election was held on 7 May 2014, and the term of the National Assembly therefore ended on 6 May 2019, but the National Assembly remained competent to function from the time it is dissolved, or its term expires, until the day before the first day of polling for the next National Assembly.

When the National Assembly's term expires (or if it is dissolved), the President must call and set dates for an election, which must be held within 90 days of the date the National Assembly was dissolved or its term expired. Therefore, if the National Assembly had not been dissolved before 6 May 2019, the election had to be held by 4 August 2019. A proclamation calling and setting dates for an election may be issued before or after the expiry of the term of the National Assembly.

On 7 February 2019, while President Cyril Ramaphosa was delivering the annual State of the Nation Address before Parliament, he announced that national and provincial elections would be held on Wednesday, 8 May 2019. This was confirmed in the official proclamation of the election date, made on 26 February 2019, which also closed the voters' roll.

== Voter registration ==
=== Local voters ===
On the weekends of 10–11 March 2018 and 26–27 January 2019, all voting stations were opened for new voters to register and for those who moved residence to re-register in their new voting district. All South African political parties launched voter registration campaigns. Politicians especially urged the youth to register to vote. Following the January 2019 registration, the commission announced that over 700,000 new voters had registered over the January registration weekend. This brought the combined total of new voters to over 1.1 million and the total number of voters on the voters' roll to 26,727,921.

=== International voters ===
Voter registrations for all South Africans living abroad took place from 1 to 4 February 2019. The registration took place during the office hours at all of South Africa's 120 diplomatic missions. On 14 March 2019, the Independent Electoral Commission confirmed that 30,532 South African voters abroad applied to be included in the election, of which 29,334 applications were approved.

== Contesting political parties ==
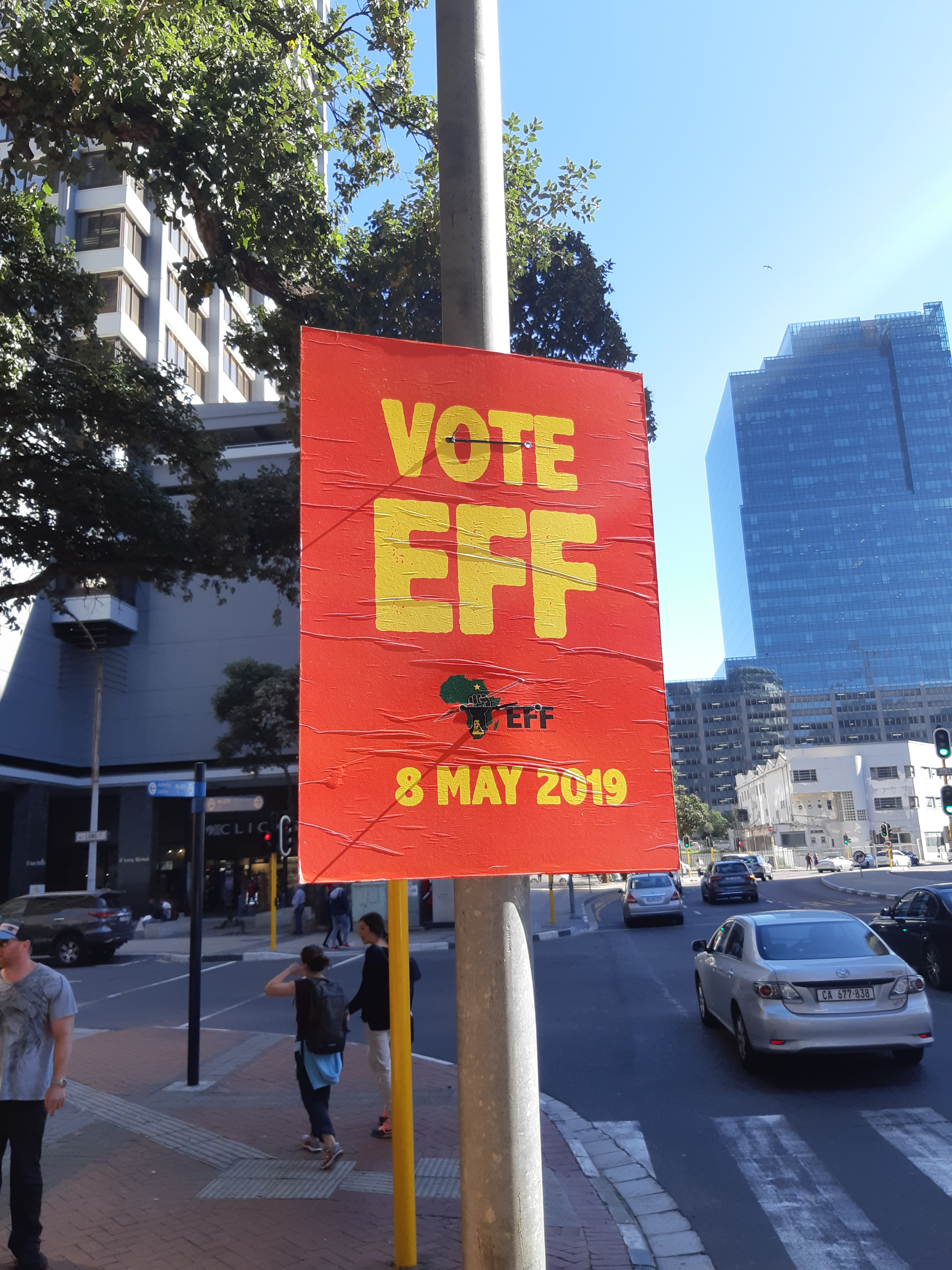
An EFF election poster in Cape Town.

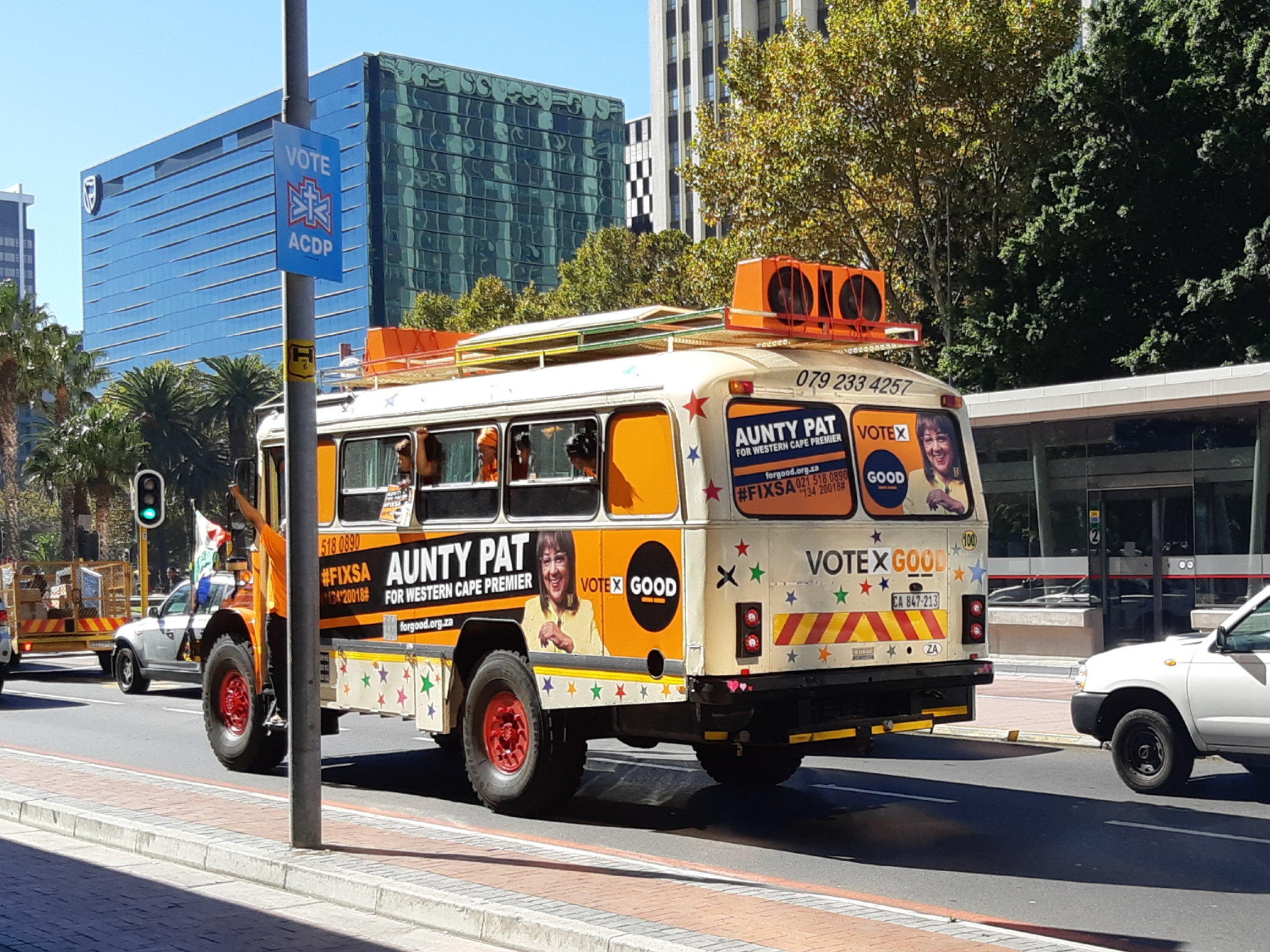
A Good party campaign bus in Cape Town. An African Christian Democratic Party election poster can be seen on the lamp post in front of the bus.

The governing African National Congress (ANC) has held a majority of the seats in the National Assembly since 1994, being re-elected with increasing majorities in 1999 and 2004, and with a slight fall in its majority in 2009 and 2014. The ANC is led by Cyril Ramaphosa, who was elected to a five-year term as President of the African National Congress, beating his rival, Nkosazana Dlamini-Zuma, by a narrow margin. David Mabuza was elected as Deputy President of the ANC, succeeding Ramaphosa.

On 14 February 2018, Zuma resigned as President of South Africa, leading Ramaphosa, as Deputy President, to succeed him as acting president and serve out the remainder of Zuma's term. Ramaphosa was elected president on 15 February 2018. Ramaphosa thus ran for a full term in office as president.

The official opposition Democratic Alliance (DA) was led by Helen Zille. She announced on 12 April 2015, that she was not running for re-election. Leader of the Opposition Mmusi Maimane and Federal Chairperson Wilmot James were seen as prominent front-runners.

At the party's 2015 Federal Congress in Port Elizabeth, Maimane was elected leader of the DA, succeeding outgoing leader Helen Zille. He defeated Wilmot James, winning close to 90% of the vote. He was backed by prominent businessman and future Johannesburg mayor Herman Mashaba. He became the first black South African to lead the DA, as well as its youngest leader to date. In the 2016 municipal elections, the party contested the municipal elections for the first time under the leadership of Mmusi Maimane. The party gained significant support and control of municipalities all across South Africa while assuming control of most Western Cape councils. In addition, the party gained three metropolitan municipalities from the ANC – Tshwane, Johannesburg and Nelson Mandela Bay. The party did increase its majority in Cape Town. They lost control of the Nelson Mandela Bay municipality in August 2018, after a vote of no confidence ousted the DA administration. The DA held its Federal Congress on 7–8 April 2018 in Pretoria. Mmusi Maimane was re-elected unopposed as the leader for another term.

The Economic Freedom Fighters (EFF) is a splinter party of the ANC that was formed in July 2013 by expelled ANC Youth League leader, Julius Malema, taking a strong anti-ANC position within its far-left economic platform, such as calling for the expropriation of land without compensation, and the nationalisation of South Africa's mines and the South African Reserve Bank. The party contested its first general elections in 2014 and garnered support across South Africa, giving it a total of 25 seats in the National Assembly.

The Inkatha Freedom Party (IFP) was led by Mangosuthu Buthelezi. The party's support has decreased since 2004 due to internal party disputes. The party gained municipalities and support in its stronghold of KwaZulu-Natal in the 2016 municipal elections. This election would be Buthelezi's last election as party president, as he announced on 20 January 2019 that he would not seek re-election to another term. The party launched its manifesto on 10 March 2019. The party elected Velenkosini Hlabisa as Buthelezi's successor.

The National Freedom Party (NFP) was formed in 2011 by disgruntled IFP members. It was launched on 25 January 2011 by Zanele kaMagwaza-Msibi, former chairperson of the Inkatha Freedom Party (IFP). The party made gains on the IFP in 2014 but lost support in 2016. The party launched its manifesto on 31 March 2019.

The Freedom Front Plus (FF+; Afrikaans: Vryheidsfront Plus, VF+) is a conservative, White separatist party formed in 1994, led by Pieter Groenewald. Since 2004, the party's support has increased but has maintained a small presence in parliament by securing no more than four seats in the National Assembly since the 2004 general election. According to the party's manifesto: "The Freedom Front Plus is irrevocably committed to the realisation of communities', in particular, the Afrikaner's, internationally recognised right to self-determination, territorial or otherwise; the maintenance, protection and promotion of their rights and interests, as well as the promotion of the right of self-determination of any other community, bound by a common language and cultural heritage in South Africa." The party launched its manifesto on 2 March 2019.

The Electoral Commission of South Africa (IEC) announced on 20 March 2019 that a record number of 48 parties had registered candidates for the national parliamentary election. This is 19 more parties that contested the 2014 national elections. In the provincial legislature elections, the total number of parties that registered candidates were:

- Eastern Cape – 26
- Free State – 28
- Gauteng – 36
- KwaZulu-Natal – 31
- Limpopo – 34
- Mpumalanga – 28
- Northern Cape – 21
- North West – 29
- Western Cape – 34

The electoral code of conduct was signed at the Gallagher Convention Centre in Midrand, Gauteng on 20 March 2019. At the signing event, a draw was held in which the African Security Congress won the right to appear at the top of the ballot paper.

Notable new parties that contested the elections include:

- Black First Land First (BLF) is a controversial far-left black nationalist political party. The party is headed by its founder and expelled EFF member, Andile Mngxitama. Mngxitama was expelled from the EFF in April 2015 and subsequently lost his National Assembly membership. He founded the party in October 2015, along with other disgruntled EFF members. The party's leaders and its members have been criticised and condemned for making racially insensitive comments that call for the killing of white South Africans. The party launched its manifesto on 6 April 2019.
- Disgruntled former ANC Member of Parliament, Makhosi Khoza, founded the political party African Democratic Change (ADeC) in December 2017. She announced in April 2018 that she was retiring from politics. She later resigned from OUTA in March 2019.
- Patricia de Lille, former mayor of Cape Town and DA member, formed the political party Good in December 2018. The party is registered with the Electoral Commission of South Africa and contested the 2019 elections. The party launched its manifesto on 5 February 2019.
- On 13 December 2018, former SABC Chief Operating Officer Hlaudi Motsoeneng joined the country's political landscape and launched a new political group named the African Content Movement (ACM). The party launched its manifesto on 6 April 2019.
- The African Transformation Movement (ATM) is a political party that was formed in October 2018. It is led by Vuyolwethu Zungula. Former Eastern Cape Democratic Alliance Provincial Chairperson Veliswa Mvenya defected to the party and became the party's Provincial Chairperson of the party.
- The Capitalist Party of South Africa (ZACP) is a political party that was launched on 17 March 2018. It was founded by ten people who describe themselves as "positive disruptors" and who believe that innovative thinking could find solutions to many of South Africa's problems. The new political party has a purple cow as its logo.
- The Land Party is led by Gcobani Ndzongana. The party grew out of land access and housing protests in Zwelihle, Hermanus in 2018. The party launched its manifesto on 21 March 2019.

=== National ===
The IEC announced on 20 March 2019 that the following parties would contest the national ballot:

- African Security Congress
- Afrikan Alliance of Social Democrats
- African Christian Democratic Party
- African Congress of Democrats
- African Content Movement
- African Covenant
- African Democratic Change
- African Independent Congress
- African National Congress
- African Renaissance Unity Party
- African Transformation Movement
- Agang South Africa
- Al Jama-ah
- Alliance for Transformation for All
- Azanian People's Organisation
- African People's Convention
- Better Residents Association
- Black First Land First
- Capitalist Party of South Africa
- Christian Political Movement
- Compatriots of South Africa
- Congress of the People
- Democratic Alliance
- Democratic Liberal Congress
- Economic Emancipation Forum
- Economic Freedom Fighters
- Forum for Service Delivery
- Free Democrats
- Freedom Front Plus
- Front National
- Good
- Independent Civic Organisation of South Africa
- Inkatha Freedom Party
- International Revelation Congress
- Land Party
- Minority Front
- National Freedom Party
- National People’s Ambassadors
- National People's Front
- Pan Africanist Congress of Azania
- Patriotic Alliance
- People’s Revolutionary Movement
- Power of Africans Unity
- Socialist Revolutionary Workers Party
- South African Maintenance and Estate Beneficiaries Association
- South African National Congress of Traditional Authorities
- United Democratic Movement
- Women Forward

=== Provincial-only ===
The following parties contested at provincial level only:

- Aboriginal Khoisan (Northern Cape)
- African Change Academy (Eastern Cape)
- African Mantungwa Community (KwaZulu-Natal)
- African Peoples Socialist Party (Limpopo)
- African Progressive Movement (Western Cape)
- All Things Are Possible (Western Cape)
- Bolsheviks Party of South Africa (Limpopo)
- Cape Party (Western Cape)
- Civic Warriors of Maruleng (Limpopo)
- Dienslewerings Party (Western Cape)
- Gaza Movement for Change (Limpopo)
- Gazankulu Liberation Congress (Gauteng, Limpopo)
- Green Party of South Africa (Western Cape)
- Justice and Employment Party (KwaZulu-Natal)
- Karoo Democratic Force (Western Cape)
- Khoisan Revolution (Northern Cape, Western Cape)
- Magoshi Swaranang Movement (Limpopo)
- New South Africa Party (Western Cape)
- National Peoples Ambassadors (KwaZulu-Natal)
- National Religious Freedom Party (KwaZulu-Natal)
- People's Republic of South Africa (Western Cape)
- Plaaslike Besorgde Inwoners (Eastern Cape, Western Cape)
- Reikemetse Dikgabo Party (North West)
- Residence Association of South Africa (Mpumalanga)
- Sindawonye Progressive Party (Mpumalanga)
- South African Concerned Residents Organisation 4 Service Delivery (Free State)
- South African Political Party (North West)
- United Christian Democratic Party (North West)
- Uniting People First (North West)
- Ximoko Party (Limpopo)
- Zenzeleni Progressive Movement (Gauteng, Mpumalanga)

=== Party defections ===
Former Mayor of Cape Town, Patricia de Lille, resigned from the Democratic Alliance on 31 October 2018. Various City of Cape Town councillors resigned along with her, including Mayoral Committee Member for Transport, Brett Herron, and City of Cape Town Chief Whip, Shaun August. De Lille has since formed a new political party named Good.

On 30 December 2018, former DA Western Cape MPP and special advisor to the Minister of Police Bheki Cele, Lennit Max, announced his resignation from the Democratic Alliance and subsequently joined the ANC. The DA had allegedly pressured Max to resign as a party member when he was appointed special advisor in July 2018.

The United Democratic Movement welcomed former Deputy Party President of the NFP, Sindi Maphumulo-Mashinini, to the party on 2 February 2019.

On 17 February 2019, African National Congress Member of Parliament, Dr Zukile Luyenge, resigned from the ANC and consequently joined the African Transformation Movement. Luyenge was a member of the ANC for thirty years and was elected MP in 2009. The Office of the ANC Chief Whip in the National Assembly confirmed the resignation.

On 2 March 2019, four Eastern Cape Democratic Alliance members resigned from the party and joined the African Transformation Movement. All of the ex-DA members had previously served as municipal councillors. On the same day, ANC, DA and EFF party t-shirts were burnt by defectors to the Minority Front at the party's manifesto launch.

Former Eastern Cape ANC Transport MEC, Thandiswa Marawu, defected to the African Transformation Movement on 11 March 2019.

On 13 March 2019, it was announced that former Provincial Leader of the Democratic Alliance in KwaZulu-Natal, Sizwe Mchunu, and several DA Msunduzi Local Municipality councillors, defected to the African National Congress. National Freedom Party MPL, Njabulo Mlaba, also defected to the ANC.

Former Eastern Cape Provincial Chairperson of the Economic Freedom Fighters, Themba Wele, defected to the African Transformation Movement on 15 March 2019.

On 26 March 2019, former ANC MP Vytjie Mentor announced that she was joining the African Christian Democratic Party.

== Issues ==
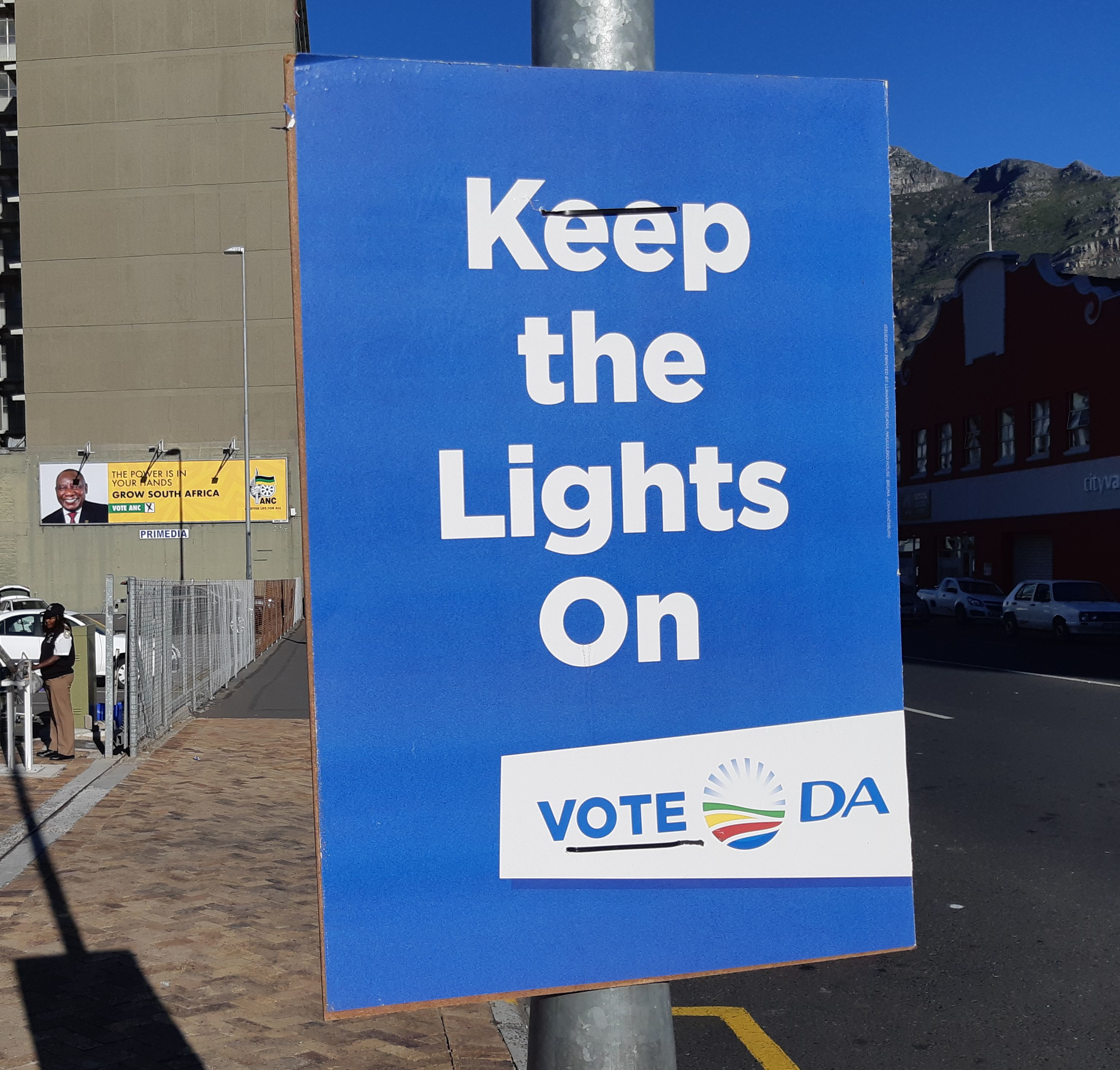
A Democratic Alliance poster in Cape Town stating "keep the lights on" in reference to the energy crisis affecting the country due to problems at the state owned electricity monopoly Eskom.

=== Corruption ===
Corruption within the government and government-owned enterprises was a significant electoral issue with all three of the largest parties campaigning on the issue. The ANC promised to fight corruption within the government and its own party whilst also controversially claiming that it had set up the Zondo Commission of Inquiry into state capture.

The DA wanted to impose a standard 15-year jail sentence for anyone caught committing corruption and establish a new anti-corruption unit in the National Prosecuting Authority to investigate politicians and government officials involved in misconduct. The EFF proposed amending the constitution to make the National Prosecuting Authority accountable to Parliament, rather than the National Government.

=== Land reform ===
Land reform was also a major campaign issue that the three largest political parties campaigned on. The ANC pledged to accelerate redistribution through expropriation in a way that will not negatively impact food security. The EFF campaign for state ownership over all land and the abolition of rents whilst the DA campaigned to strengthen property rights but at the same time implementing a land-reform program that increases access to land ownership. The Freedom Front Plus (FF+) and Congress of the People (COPE) and many other parties are strongly opposed to land expropriation without compensation. COPE and AfriForum have since formed a partnership in their opposition to the controversial policy.

=== Economic growth ===
The ANC announced that it would be making economic growth and reducing unemployment the party's main campaign issues during the election. A particular focus for the ANC was on youth unemployment with a promise to create 275,000 new jobs a year for five years and attract R1.2 trillion in investment. Other parties also focused on job creation with the DA promising economic reforms to encourage growth and promoting the growth of small businesses. DA Federal Leader Mmusi Maimane advocated for a job in every household, whilst the EFF promised special economic zones to attract foreign investment.

=== Crime ===
A number of parties campaigned on the issue of crime and how to deal with it. The ANC pledged to strengthen the police force through better training and recruiting more officers whilst also focusing on dealing with gender-based violence. The DA advocated for the creation and strengthening of local level police forces instead of existing government policy focusing on the national level South African Police Service. The EFF promised harsher sentences for offenders and to greatly expand the police force.

The Inkatha Freedom Party (IFP), African Covenant and the African Transformation Movement (ATM) campaigned for the return of the death penalty.

=== Electricity crisis ===
Rolling electricity blackouts caused by long-running and ongoing problems resulting from mismanagement and corruption at the state utility Eskom was an election issue that the Democratic Alliance campaigned on against the incumbent ANC. Mmusi Maimane and the Democratic Alliance Western Cape Premier candidate, Alan Winde, campaigned for the Western Cape to procure its electricity supply from Independent Power Producers (IPPs). ANC President Cyril Ramaphosa said that South Africa would overcome the electricity crisis.

== Events ==
=== Durban xenophobic riots ===
On 25 March 2019 in the run-up to the election xenophobic riots targeting African immigrants broke out in Durban resulting in the deaths of three people and the looting of foreign-owned stores. A speech given by President Cyril Ramaphosa at the ANC's election manifesto launch in the area two months prior where Ramaphosa committed to cracking down on undocumented foreigners involved in criminal activities was blamed for contributing to xenophobic feeling. The riots and the xenophobic feeling was condemned by political parties and the government.

=== National service delivery protests ===
In early April 2019, a number of service delivery protests took place in Alexandra and Tshwane. The protests were supported by the trade union SAFTU who called on other areas in the province to join the protests. On 11 April 2019, the protests spread to areas of other major cities in the rest of the country. The DA and EFF accused the ANC of instigating the Alexandra protests as an election tactic in the runup to the election in May whilst the ANC accused the DA of not effectively delivering services to the protesting communities. The DA made a counter-accusation that it was ANC governance in these areas two years before was the root cause of poor service delivery in Alexandra.

=== Accusations of Russian influence ===
Just before the election was concluded accusations of Russian influence operations in the elections were published in the South African media. The Daily Maverick and Guardian newspapers reported that Putin associate Yevgeny Prigozhin worked to increase support for the ANC and undermine support for the DA and EFF. The Daily Maverick and Dossier Center report stated that Russian political analysis worked "under the auspices of Afric and the International Anti-Crisis Center" to conduct an influence-buying and disinformation campaign. The Russian embassy in South Africa denied the accusation and stated that the accusation does "not stand [up to] basic scrutiny."

== Voting ==
=== International special votes ===
Over 29,300 South Africans registered to participate in the national election in the international voting phase, which took place at 120 international voting stations on 27 April 2019. The overseas ballots were counted along with the domestic votes on 8 May 2019.

=== Special votes ===
The local special vote phase of the election took place from 6 to 7 May 2019, accommodating South Africans who are physically infirm, disabled or pregnant or are unable to vote at their voting station on the polling day. The registration for special votes took place from 4 to 18 April 2019. More than 770,000 voters had registered for special votes. Archbishop Emeritus Desmond Tutu and his wife Leah cast their special votes on 6 May.

=== Voting day ===
Voting took place relatively smoothly at 22,925 voting stations in South Africa. Voting stations opened at 7:00. By 11:30, the IEC announced that 17 voting stations had not opened, of which 14 were located in the KwaZulu-Natal. A total of 5 voting stations were not operational on voting day. The Commission blamed ongoing community unrest for the derailing of election operations. Voting stations closed and counting began at 21:00.

==== Incidents ====
Nineteen people were arrested for allegedly "double voting" in three KwaZulu-Natal municipalities. It is still unclear whether a twentieth person has been arrested.

An elderly woman died on voting day while trying to cast her ballot. The Gauteng African National Congress sent their condolences. An Eastern Cape deputy presiding officer also died.

==== Indelible ink ====
During the election there was some controversy over the quality of indelible ink used to mark voters and prevent double voting. It was reported by some voters that the ink was easily removed shortly after voting, leading to questions around the quality of the ink used. An IEC investigation following the elections concluded that there were "negligible risks" to the election and its results caused by this event.

== Opinion polls ==
Pollster	Fieldwork date	Sample size	ANC	DA	EFF	Others	Don't know (Note: Includes Abstention and No answer responses)	Lead
2019 election results	8 May 2019	N/A	57.5	20.8	10.8	10.9	N/A	36.7
Intellidex	2 May 2019	Investor poll	57.4	20.7	11.5	N/A	N/A	36.7
IRR	18 Apr 2019 – 25 Apr 2019	2,375	49.5	21.3	14.9	9.3	0.9	27.7
Ipsos	22 Mar 2019 – 17 Apr 2019	3,600	56.9	15.2	9.5	5.9	12.5	41.7
Ipsos	1 Feb 2019 – 4 Mar 2019	3,511	61	18	10	11	0	43
IRR	12 Feb 2019 – 26 Feb 2019	1,611	54.7	21.8	12.2	8.8	2.5	32.9
Afric	29 Jan 2019 – 8 Feb 2019	1,501	58.1	9.8	16.7	3.5	11.9	41.4
Ipsos	23 Oct 2018 – 4 Dec 2018	3,571	61	14	9	4	12	47
IRR	26 Nov – 4 Dec 2018	1,017	56	18	11	14	1	38
Afrobarometer	Aug—Sep 2018	1,800	48	11	11	3	27	37
IRR	22 Aug – 4 Sep 2018	978	52	23	13	10	2	29
	20 Apr – 7 Jun 2018	3,738	60	13	7	2	18	47
Ipsos	May 2017	3,471	47	21	5	3	24	26
2014 election results	7 May 2014	N/A	62.2	22.2	6.4	5.3	N/A	40

== Results ==
=== Parliament ===
Map showing the largest party in each ward following the election. African National Congress majority African National Congress plurality Democratic Alliance majority Democratic Alliance plurality Inkatha Freedom Party majority Inkatha Freedom Party plurality Other party majority Other party plurality

==== National Assembly ====
Map showing the party with the largest number of votes in each voting district in the election for the National Assembly. African National Congress Democratic Alliance Economic Freedom Fighters Inkatha Freedom Party Freedom Front Plus Other party Tie between two or more parties

Results of the national vote by municipality. ANC majority ANC plurality DA majority DA plurality Inkatha majority Inkatha plurality ICOSA plurality

Seats in the National Assembly won by province

Party	Votes	%	+/–	Seats	+/–
African National Congress	10,026,475	57.50	–4.65	230	–19
Democratic Alliance	3,622,531	20.77	–1.36	84	–5
Economic Freedom Fighters	1,882,480	10.80	+4.45	44	+19
Inkatha Freedom Party	588,839	3.38	+0.98	14	+4
Freedom Front Plus	414,864	2.38	+1.48	10	+6
African Christian Democratic Party	146,262	0.84	+0.27	4	+1
United Democratic Movement	78,030	0.45	–0.55	2	–2
African Transformation Movement	76,830	0.44	New	2	New
Good	70,408	0.40	New	2	New
National Freedom Party	61,220	0.35	–1.22	2	–4
African Independent Congress	48,107	0.28	–0.25	2	–1
Congress of the People	47,461	0.27	–0.40	2	–1
Pan Africanist Congress	32,677	0.19	–0.02	1	0
Al Jama-ah	31,468	0.18	+0.04	1	+1
African Security Congress	26,262	0.15	New	0	New
Socialist Revolutionary Workers Party	24,439	0.14	New	0	New
Black First Land First	19,796	0.11	New	0	New
African People's Convention	19,593	0.11	–0.06	0	–1
Afrikan Alliance of Social Democrats	18,834	0.11	New	0	New
Capitalist Party of South Africa	15,915	0.09	New	0	New
Alliance for Transformation for All	14,266	0.08	New	0	New
Agang South Africa	13,856	0.08	–0.20	0	–2
Azanian People's Organisation	12,823	0.07	–0.04	0	0
Independent Civic Organisation	12,386	0.07	–0.01	0	0
Minority Front	11,961	0.07	–0.05	0	0
Democratic Liberal Congress	10,660	0.06	New	0	New
Better Residents Association	9,179	0.05	–0.03	0	0
Forum for Service Delivery	7,564	0.04	New	0	New
Front National	7,144	0.04	+0.01	0	0
Land Party	7,074	0.04	New	0	New
African Covenant	7,019	0.04	New	0	New
Patriotic Alliance	6,660	0.04	–0.03	0	0
African Democratic Change	6,499	0.04	New	0	New
Economic Emancipation Forum	6,321	0.04	New	0	New
Women Forward	6,108	0.04	New	0	New
Christian Political Movement	4,980	0.03	New	0	New
African Content Movement	4,841	0.03	New	0	New
International Revelation Congress	4,247	0.02	New	0	New
National People's Front	4,019	0.02	New	0	New
African Renaissance Unity Party	3,860	0.02	New	0	New
African Congress of Democrats	3,768	0.02	New	0	New
South African National Congress of Traditional Authorities	3,714	0.02	New	0	New
Compatriots of South Africa	3,406	0.02	New	0	New
People's Revolutionary Movement	2,844	0.02	New	0	New
Power of Africans Unity	2,685	0.02	New	0	New
Free Democrats	2,580	0.01	New	0	New
South African Maintenance and Estate Beneficiaries Association	2,445	0.01	New	0	New
National People's Ambassadors	1,979	0.01	New	0	New
Total	17,437,379	100.00	–	400	0
Valid votes	17,437,379	98.67			
Invalid/blank votes	235,472	1.33			
Total votes	17,672,851	100.00			
Registered voters/turnout	26,756,649	66.05			
Source: Electoral Commission of South Africa

==== National Council of Provinces ====
After the elections of 8 May 2019, the new provincial legislatures met on 22 May to elect NCOP delegations. The delegations elected are described in the following table.

Party	Delegate type	Province									Total	
Party	Delegate type	EC	FS	G	KZN	L	M	NW	NC	WC	Total	
African National Congress	Permanent	4	3	3	3	4	4	3	3	2	29	54
African National Congress	Special	3	3	2	3	4	3	3	3	1	25	54
Democratic Alliance	Permanent	1	1	2	1	1	1	1	2	3	13	20
Democratic Alliance	Special	1	1	1					1	3	7	20
Economic Freedom Fighters	Permanent	1	1	1	1	1	1	1	1	1	9	11
Economic Freedom Fighters	Special			1				1			2	11
Freedom Front Plus	Permanent		1					1			2	3
Freedom Front Plus	Special						1				1	3
Inkatha Freedom Party	Permanent				1						1	2
Inkatha Freedom Party	Special				1						1	2
Total		10	10	10	10	10	10	10	10	10	90	

=== Provincial legislatures ===
==== Eastern Cape ====
Party	Votes	%	+/–	Seats	+/–
African National Congress	1,357,137	68.74	–1.35	44	–1
Democratic Alliance	310,538	15.73	–0.47	10	0
Economic Freedom Fighters	154,821	7.84	+4.36	5	+3
United Democratic Movement	51,233	2.60	–3.56	2	–2
African Transformation Movement	30,082	1.52	New	1	New
Freedom Front Plus	11,548	0.58	+0.27	1	+1
African Christian Democratic Party	9,249	0.47	+0.14	0	0
African Independent Congress	8,331	0.42	–0.35	0	–1
Pan Africanist Congress	8,009	0.41	–0.03	0	0
Alliance for Transformation for All	5,238	0.27	New	0	New
Congress of the People	4,971	0.25	–0.95	0	–1
Socialist Revolutionary Workers Party	4,807	0.24	New	0	New
Good	4,670	0.24	New	0	New
Al Jama-ah	3,007	0.15	New	0	New
African People's Convention	2,513	0.13	–0.10	0	0
Azanian People's Organisation	1,585	0.08	–0.04	0	0
Inkatha Freedom Party	1,028	0.05	–0.01	0	0
Christian Political Movement	1,016	0.05	New	0	New
Forum for Service Delivery	902	0.05	New	0	New
African Change Academy	634	0.03	New	0	New
National Freedom Party	593	0.03	–0.13	0	0
African Covenant	549	0.03	New	0	New
Plaaslike Besorgde Inwoners	534	0.03	New	0	New
International Revelation Congress	452	0.02	New	0	New
African Content Movement	374	0.02	New	0	New
People's Revolutionary Movement	360	0.02	New	0	New
Total	1,974,181	100.00	–	63	0
Valid votes	1,974,181	98.65			
Invalid/blank votes	27,081	1.35			
Total votes	2,001,262	100.00			
Registered voters/turnout	3,363,161	59.51			
Source: Election Resources

==== Free State ====
Party	Votes	%	+/–	Seats	+/–
African National Congress	541,535	61.14	–8.71	19	–3
Democratic Alliance	155,694	17.58	+1.35	6	+1
Economic Freedom Fighters	111,427	12.58	+4.43	4	+2
Freedom Front Plus	35,031	3.96	+1.86	1	0
African Transformation Movement	6,897	0.78	New	0	New
Patriotic Alliance	4,950	0.56	+0.50	0	0
Congress of the People	3,972	0.45	–1.18	0	0
African Independent Congress	3,960	0.45	New	0	New
African Christian Democratic Party	3,697	0.42	–0.09	0	0
African Democratic Change	3,346	0.38	New	0	New
African Content Movement	1,885	0.21	New	0	New
Afrikan Alliance of Social Democrats	1,646	0.19	New	0	New
Socialist Revolutionary Workers Party	1,567	0.18	New	0	New
Pan Africanist Congress	1,513	0.17	–0.04	0	0
Agang South Africa	1,338	0.15	–0.05	0	0
African People's Convention	1,309	0.15	–0.17	0	0
Azanian People's Organisation	833	0.09	–0.07	0	0
United Democratic Movement	826	0.09	–0.12	0	0
Good	709	0.08	New	0	New
Inkatha Freedom Party	705	0.08	–0.03	0	0
Power of Africans Unity	533	0.06	New	0	New
African Congress of Democrats	505	0.06	New	0	New
Women Forward	408	0.05	New	0	New
African Covenant	365	0.04	New	0	New
Alliance for Transformation for All	361	0.04	New	0	New
National Freedom Party	288	0.03	–0.08	0	0
South African Concerned Residents Organisation 4 Service Delivery	253	0.03	New	0	New
South African National Congress of Traditional Authorities	124	0.01	New	0	New
Total	885,677	100.00	–	30	0
Valid votes	885,677	98.72			
Invalid/blank votes	11,508	1.28			
Total votes	897,185	100.00			
Registered voters/turnout	1,462,508	61.35			
Source: Election Resources

==== Gauteng ====
Party	Votes	%	+/–	Seats	+/–
African National Congress	2,168,253	50.19	–3.40	37	–3
Democratic Alliance	1,185,743	27.45	–3.33	20	–3
Economic Freedom Fighters	634,387	14.69	+4.39	11	+3
Freedom Front Plus	153,844	3.56	+2.36	3	+2
Inkatha Freedom Party	38,263	0.89	+0.11	1	0
African Christian Democratic Party	30,605	0.71	+0.09	1	+1
African Transformation Movement	10,861	0.25	New	0	New
Pan Africanist Congress	10,534	0.24	–0.02	0	0
Congress of the People	10,197	0.24	–0.25	0	0
United Democratic Movement	9,267	0.21	–0.23	0	0
African Independent Congress	9,016	0.21	New	0	New
Good	8,544	0.20	New	0	New
Al Jama-ah	7,606	0.18	New	0	New
Black First Land First	5,773	0.13	New	0	New
Socialist Revolutionary Workers Party	5,465	0.13	New	0	New
Azanian People's Organisation	3,516	0.08	–0.04	0	0
National Freedom Party	3,177	0.07	–0.40	0	0
Agang South Africa	3,158	0.07	–0.35	0	0
African People's Convention	3,128	0.07	–0.09	0	0
African Covenant	2,528	0.06	New	0	New
Women Forward	2,050	0.05	+0.05	0	0
Patriotic Alliance	1,773	0.04	0.00	0	0
Economic Emancipation Forum	1,700	0.04	New	0	New
Independent Civic Organisation	1,470	0.03	+0.01	0	0
Alliance for Transformation for All	1,401	0.03	New	0	New
African Content Movement	1,251	0.03	New	0	New
National People’s Front	1,125	0.03	New	0	New
African Renaissance Unity Party	927	0.02	New	0	New
African Democratic Change	918	0.02	New	0	New
International Revelation Congress	722	0.02	New	0	New
Gazankulu Liberation Congress	672	0.02	New	0	New
Better Residents Association	525	0.01	New	0	New
Land Party	511	0.01	New	0	New
Power of Africans Unity	470	0.01	New	0	New
South African National Congress of Traditional Authorities	367	0.01	New	0	New
Zenzeleni Progressive Movement	190	0.00	New	0	New
Total	4,319,937	100.00	–	73	0
Valid votes	4,319,937	99.14			
Invalid/blank votes	37,411	0.86			
Total votes	4,357,348	100.00			
Registered voters/turnout	6,381,220	68.28			
Source: Election Resources

==== KwaZulu-Natal ====
Party	Votes	%	+/–	Seats	+/–
African National Congress	1,951,027	54.22	–10.30	44	–8
Inkatha Freedom Party	588,046	16.34	+5.47	13	+4
Democratic Alliance	500,051	13.90	+1.14	11	+1
Economic Freedom Fighters	349,361	9.71	+7.86	8	+6
National Freedom Party	56,587	1.57	–5.74	1	–5
Minority Front	18,864	0.52	–0.5	1	0
African Transformation Movement	17,729	0.49	New	1	New
African Christian Democratic Party	17,214	0.48	+0.04	1	+1
Democratic Liberal Congress	13,698	0.38	New	0	New
Freedom Front Plus	11,269	0.31	+0.11	0	0
Al Jama-ah	9,899	0.28	New	0	New
African Independent Congress	9,291	0.26	New	0	New
Justice and Employment Party	8,156	0.23	New	0	New
Black First Land First	5,790	0.16	New	0	New
Congress of the People	4,957	0.14	–0.02	0	0
Socialist Revolutionary Workers Party	4,222	0.12	New	0	New
Good	4,016	0.11	New	0	New
African People's Convention	3,650	0.10	–0.08	0	0
United Democratic Movement	3,558	0.10	–0.07	0	0
Alliance for Transformation for All	2,624	0.07	New	0	New
Azanian People's Organisation	2,512	0.07	–0.08	0	0
Pan Africanist Congress	2,510	0.07	–0.01	0	0
National People’s Front	2,437	0.07	New	0	New
People's Revolutionary Movement	2,402	0.07	New	0	New
African Mantungwa Community	1,594	0.04	New	0	New
African Renaissance Unity Party	1,376	0.04	New	0	New
African Content Movement	1,369	0.04	New	0	New
National People's Ambassadors	1,294	0.04	New	0	New
Women Forward	944	0.03	New	0	New
African Covenant	938	0.03	New	0	New
National Religious Freedom Party	896	0.02	New	0	New
Total	3,598,281	100.00	–	80	0
Valid votes	3,598,281	98.46			
Invalid/blank votes	56,420	1.54			
Total votes	3,654,701	100.00			
Registered voters/turnout	5,524,666	66.15			
Source: Election Resources

==== Limpopo ====
Party	Votes	%	+/–	Seats	+/–
African National Congress	1,096,300	75.49	–3.11	38	–1
Economic Freedom Fighters	209,488	14.43	+3.69	7	+1
Democratic Alliance	78,360	5.40	–1.08	3	0
Freedom Front Plus	20,572	1.42	+0.73	1	+1
African People's Convention	5,290	0.36	+0.01	0	0
African Christian Democratic Party	5,069	0.35	–0.13	0	0
African Transformation Movement	4,136	0.28	New	0	New
African Independent Congress	3,961	0.27	New	0	New
Congress of the People	3,398	0.23	–0.63	0	–1
Azanian People's Organisation	2,450	0.17	–0.09	0	0
Pan Africanist Congress	2,408	0.17	–0.12	0	0
Agang South Africa	2,265	0.16	–0.20	0	0
Bolsheviks Party of South Africa	2,088	0.14	New	0	New
South African Maintenance and Estate Beneficiaries Association	2,045	0.14	+0.06	0	0
Civic Warriors of Maruleng	2,043	0.14	New	0	New
International Revelation Congress	1,799	0.12	New	0	New
Socialist Revolutionary Workers Party	1,392	0.10	New	0	New
United Democratic Movement	1,324	0.09	–0.18	0	0
Ximoko Party	1,163	0.08	–0.13	0	0
Gaza Movement for Change	831	0.06	New	0	New
African Covenant	690	0.05	New	0	New
Inkatha Freedom Party	655	0.05	–0.03	0	0
Magoshi Swaranang Movement	651	0.04	New	0	New
Better Residents Association	647	0.04	New	0	New
Good	494	0.03	New	0	New
Gazankulu Liberation Congress	462	0.03	New	0	New
Power of Africans Unity	414	0.03	New	0	New
African Renaissance Unity Party	397	0.03	New	0	New
African Content Movement	281	0.02	New	0	New
African People's Socialist	267	0.02	New	0	New
Women Forward	256	0.02	New	0	New
Land Party	227	0.02	New	0	New
National Freedom Party	191	0.01	–0.03	0	0
South African National Congress of Traditional Authorities	144	0.01	New	0	New
Total	1,452,158	100.00	–	49	0
Valid votes	1,452,158	98.77			
Invalid/blank votes	18,072	1.23			
Total votes	1,470,230	100.00			
Registered voters/turnout	2,608,460	56.36			
Source: Election Resources

==== Mpumalanga ====
Party	Votes	%	+/–	Seats	+/–
African National Congress	858,589	70.58	–7.65	22	–2
Economic Freedom Fighters	155,573	12.79	+6.53	4	+2
Democratic Alliance	118,915	9.77	–0.63	3	0
Freedom Front Plus	29,512	2.43	+1.61	1	+1
Better Residents Association	8,816	0.72	–0.43	0	–1
African Transformation Movement	7,468	0.61	New	0	New
African Christian Democratic Party	6,183	0.51	+0.11	0	0
African Independent Congress	4,376	0.36	New	0	New
African People's Convention	4,083	0.34	–0.10	0	0
Inkatha Freedom Party	3,750	0.31	+0.05	0	0
South African National Congress of Traditional Authorities	2,884	0.24	New	0	New
Agang South Africa	1,828	0.15	+0.02	0	0
Congress of the People	1,819	0.15	–0.17	0	0
Socialist Revolutionary Workers Party	1,814	0.15	New	0	New
Pan Africanist Congress	1,683	0.14	–0.09	0	0
National Freedom Party	1,430	0.12	–0.63	0	0
Sindawonye Progressive Party	1,205	0.10	–0.22	0	0
Black First Land First	1,097	0.09	New	0	New
Forum for Service Delivery	949	0.08	New	0	New
United Democratic Movement	917	0.08	–0.05	0	0
Good	673	0.06	New	0	New
African Covenant	541	0.04	New	0	New
Azanian People's Organisation	526	0.04	–0.05	0	0
Alliance for Transformation for All	513	0.04	New	0	New
Residence Association of South Africa	489	0.04	New	0	New
International Revelation Congress	441	0.04	New	0	New
African Content Movement	323	0.03	New	0	New
Zenzeleni Progressive Movement	125	0.01	New	0	New
Total	1,216,522	100.00	–	30	0
Valid votes	1,216,522	98.62			
Invalid/blank votes	17,022	1.38			
Total votes	1,233,544	100.00			
Registered voters/turnout	1,951,776	63.20			
Source: Election Resources

==== Northern Cape ====
Party	Votes	%	+/–	Seats	+/–
African National Congress	228,265	57.54	–6.86	18	–2
Democratic Alliance	101,198	25.51	+1.62	8	+1
Economic Freedom Fighters	38,527	9.71	+4.75	3	+1
Freedom Front Plus	10,641	2.68	+1.59	1	+1
Congress of the People	3,400	0.86	–2.74	0	–1
Good	3,283	0.83	New	0	New
African Christian Democratic Party	2,912	0.73	+0.20	0	0
African Independent Congress	2,191	0.55	New	0	New
Azanian People's Organisation	996	0.25	0.00	0	0
Khoisan Revolution	990	0.25	New	0	New
African Transformation Movement	940	0.24	New	0	New
African People's Convention	608	0.15	–0.13	0	0
Aboriginal Khoisan	573	0.14	New	0	New
Socialist Revolutionary Workers Party	542	0.14	New	0	New
Pan Africanist Congress	435	0.11	0.00	0	0
Afrikan Alliance of Social Democrats	360	0.09	New	0	New
United Democratic Movement	245	0.06	–0.03	0	0
African Covenant	196	0.05	New	0	New
National Freedom Party	157	0.04	+0.01	0	0
International Revelation Congress	120	0.03	New	0	New
African Content Movement	100	0.03	New	0	New
Total	396,679	100.00	–	30	0
Valid votes	396,679	98.76			
Invalid/blank votes	4,984	1.24			
Total votes	401,663	100.00			
Registered voters/turnout	626,471	64.12			
Source: Election Resources

==== North West ====
Party	Votes	%	+/–	Seats	+/–
African National Congress	590,777	61.87	–5.52	21	–2
Economic Freedom Fighters	177,983	18.64	+5.43	6	+1
Democratic Alliance	106,738	11.18	–1.55	4	0
Freedom Front Plus	41,266	4.32	+2.60	2	+1
United Christian Democratic Party	4,628	0.48	–0.70	0	0
African Independent Congress	4,398	0.46	New	0	New
African Transformation Movement	3,684	0.39	New	0	New
African Christian Democratic Party	3,225	0.34	–0.19	0	0
Forum for Service Delivery	3,159	0.33	New	0	New
United Democratic Movement	2,842	0.30	–0.58	0	0
Congress of the People	2,595	0.27	–0.53	0	0
Agang South Africa	1,981	0.21	–0.23	0	0
Socialist Revolutionary Workers Party	1,884	0.20	New	0	New
African People's Convention	1,285	0.13	–0.27	0	0
Good	1,144	0.12	New	0	New
Pan Africanist Congress	1,013	0.11	–0.03	0	0
Inkatha Freedom Party	808	0.08	–0.06	0	0
Azanian People's Organisation	782	0.08	–0.09	0	0
Black First Land First	668	0.07	New	0	New
Alliance for Transformation for All	577	0.06	New	0	New
National Freedom Party	532	0.06	–0.09	0	0
Women Forward	527	0.06	New	0	New
African Covenant	525	0.05	New	0	New
African Content Movement	359	0.04	New	0	New
South African Political Party	356	0.04	–0.02	0	0
International Revelation Congress	333	0.03	New	0	New
Uniting People First	321	0.03	New	0	New
Patriotic Alliance	306	0.03	New	0	New
Reikemetse Dikgabo Party	140	0.01	New	0	New
Total	954,836	100.00	–	33	0
Valid votes	954,836	98.37			
Invalid/blank votes	15,833	1.63			
Total votes	970,669	100.00			
Registered voters/turnout	1,702,728	57.01			
Source: Election Resources

==== Western Cape ====
Party	Votes	%	+/–	Seats	+/–
Democratic Alliance	1,140,647	55.45	–3.93	24	–2
African National Congress	589,055	28.63	–4.25	12	–2
Economic Freedom Fighters	83,075	4.04	+1.93	2	+1
Good	61,971	3.01	New	1	New
African Christian Democratic Party	54,762	2.66	+1.64	1	0
Freedom Front Plus	32,115	1.56	+1.01	1	+1
Al Jama-ah	17,607	0.86	+0.24	1	+1
Independent Civic Organisation	9,536	0.46	–0.10	0	0
Cape Party	9,331	0.45	New	0	New
Congress of the People	6,528	0.32	–0.27	0	0
Alliance for Transformation for All	6,175	0.30	New	0	New
Land Party	5,926	0.29	New	0	New
United Democratic Movement	5,728	0.28	–0.20	0	0
African Transformation Movement	4,953	0.24	New	0	New
Plaaslike Besorgde Inwoners	3,852	0.19	New	0	New
Pan Africanist Congress	3,845	0.19	+0.02	0	0
Socialist Revolutionary Workers Party	3,026	0.15	New	0	New
African Independent Congress	2,898	0.14	–0.17	0	0
Green Party	2,613	0.13	New	0	New
National Freedom Party	2,240	0.11	+0.07	0	0
Khoisan Revolution	1,854	0.09	New	0	New
Dienslewerings Party	1,703	0.08	New	0	New
Karoo Democratic Force	1,512	0.07	New	0	New
African Covenant	993	0.05	New	0	New
African People's Convention	915	0.04	–0.02	0	0
People's Republic of South Africa	710	0.03	New	0	New
Inkatha Freedom Party	599	0.03	–0.02	0	0
All Things Are Possible	556	0.03	New	0	New
African Progressive Movement	531	0.03	New	0	New
Azanian People's Organisation	475	0.02	–0.02	0	0
Free Democrats	470	0.02	New	0	New
New South Africa Party	444	0.02	New	0	New
Forum for Service Delivery	310	0.02	New	0	New
African Content Movement	257	0.01	New	0	New
Total	2,057,212	100.00	–	42	–
Valid votes	2,057,212	99.20			
Invalid/blank votes	16,516	0.80			
Total votes	2,073,728	100.00			
Registered voters/turnout	3,128,567	66.28			
Source: Election Resources

== Aftermath ==
=== Party leadership ===
The African National Congress (ANC) announced its parliamentary leadership candidates on 20 May 2019. The party announced that outgoing National Council of Provinces Chairperson, Thandi Modise, would succeed Baleka Mbete as Speaker of the National Assembly. Amos Masondo was named the new Chairperson of National Council of the Provinces. Controversial ANC politician, Nomvula Mokonyane, was named as the party's candidate for the post of Chair of Committees, but she withdrew her name prior to the first sitting of the new National Assembly. Outgoing Speaker of the National Assembly Baleka Mbete and former ANC MP Malusi Gigaba declined their seats.

After the elections, it was speculated that the Democratic Alliance (DA) would dismiss its leader, Mmusi Maimane, due to the party's decline in the polls. When asked about the speculations, the DA Federal Council Chairperson James Selfe said "that will be up to the party to decide." The following week, the party's Federal Chairperson Athol Trollip, after in consultation with the Federal Executive members, announced that Maimane could remain leader until the next DA Federal Congress. Maimane resigned from the party on 24 October 2019. John Steenhuisen was elected his interim successor on 17 November 2019. Senior Freedom Front Plus member Philip van Staden stated that his party benefited considerably in the election due to the Maimane's positions on race and ethnic identity resulting in the alienation of many white voters.

The Congress of the People (COPE), who had a dismal showing and further declined in this election, was rumoured to be planning a motion of no confidence in its leader, Mosiuoa Lekota, to effectively dismiss him over the party's partnership with controversial AfriForum. The party quickly rubbished the claims, stating that it has full confidence in its leader.

The Inkatha Freedom Party (IFP) held its elective conference in August 2019 to elect a new leader for the first time in its history as chief Mangosuthu Buthelezi stepped down after 44 years at the helm. The conference elected former mayor and current leader of the opposition in the KwaZulu-Natal Legislature, Velenkosini Hlabisa, as his successor.

=== Swearing-in of MPs and MPLs ===
The National Assembly and all nine provincial legislatures reconvened on 22 May 2019, while the National Council of Provinces reconvened on the following day, 23 May 2019.

On 22 May 2019, the National Assembly reconvened, Chief Justice Mogoeng presided over the swearing-in of MPs and the election of the Speaker of the National Assembly. Former NCOP chairperson Thandi Modise of the African National Congress (ANC) was elected Speaker. Modise defeated the Democratic Alliance's candidate Richard Majola, by a margin of 250 votes to only 83 votes for Majola. Modise presided over the deputy speaker's election. Incumbent deputy speaker Solomon Lechesa Tsenoli of the ANC was re-elected unopposed. The chief justice then presided over the election of the president. Incumbent president Cyril Ramaphosa of the ANC was re-elected unopposed. After the election, Ramaphosa immediately ceased to be a Member of Parliament.

The first sitting of the National Council of Provinces was held on 23 May 2019. Permanent delegates were sworn in and a chairperson, deputy chairperson, House Chairpersons and Chief Whip were elected. Former mayor of Johannesburg Amos Masondo was elected chairperson of the National Council of Provinces, while former Northern Cape premier Sylvia Lucas was elected deputy chairperson. ANC Chief Whip Seiso Mohai was re-elected.

=== Presidential inauguration and government formation ===
The official presidential inauguration took place on 25 May 2019. Chief Justice Mogoeng Mogoeng swore President-elect Cyril Ramaphosa in for his full-term as Executive President. The inauguration was the first to be held at the Loftus Versfeld Stadium in Pretoria, and not at the Union Buildings. The Union Buildings had been the official venue of the presidential inauguration since the country's first democratically elected president, Nelson Mandela, took the oath of office in 1994.

Shortly after, on 29 May 2019, Ramaphosa announced his new cabinet. The restructured cabinet has been reduced from 36 to only 28 ministries and includes former Gauteng Finance MEC Barbara Creecy, Good Party Leader Patricia de Lille and former mayor of Johannesburg Parks Tau. Fourteen ministers were not reappointed to this cabinet. Notable outgoing ministers included Jeff Radebe, Bathabile Dlamini, Nomaindia Mfeketo and Tokozile Xasa. The newly appointed ministers were officially sworn in on 30 May 2019. In the following days, multiple former ministers resigned their seats in the National Assembly.
