= Uniting People First =

Political party in South Africa

- National Assembly seats: 0 / 400
- Provincial Legislatures: 0 / 430

Uniting People First is a minor political party in South Africa.

The party aims to represent traditional healers and the LGBTI community.

Uniting People First has contested a number of by-elections since its formation, but has failed to win representation.

The party contested the 2019 South African general election at provincial level in North West only, failing to win any seats.

== Provincial elections ==
Election	Eastern Cape		Free State		Gauteng		Kwazulu-Natal		Limpopo		Mpumalanga		North-West		Northern Cape		Western Cape	
Election	%	Seats	%	Seats	%	Seats	%	Seats	%	Seats	%	Seats	%	Seats	%	Seats	%	Seats
2019	-	-	-	-	-	-	-	-	-	-	-	-	0.03%	0/33	-	-	-	-
