= All Things Are Possible (political party) =

Political party in South Africa

- Leader: Allan Pillay

All Things Are Possible is a minor political party in South Africa.

The party is focused on crime and justice, and is calling for a return of the Death penalty.

Party leader Allan Pillay stated that none of the top executives in the party own property, and that he had sold his house in order to fund the campaign.

The party contested the 2019 South African general election at provincial level in the Western Cape only, failing to win a seat.

== Election results ==
=== Provincial elections ===
Election	Eastern Cape		Free State		Gauteng		Kwazulu-Natal		Limpopo		Mpumalanga		North-West		Northern Cape		Western Cape	
Election	%	Seats	%	Seats	%	Seats	%	Seats	%	Seats	%	Seats	%	Seats	%	Seats	%	Seats
2019	-	-	-	-	-	-	-	-	-	-	-	-	-	-	-	-	0.03%	0/42
