= Capitalist Party of South Africa =

Political party in South Africa

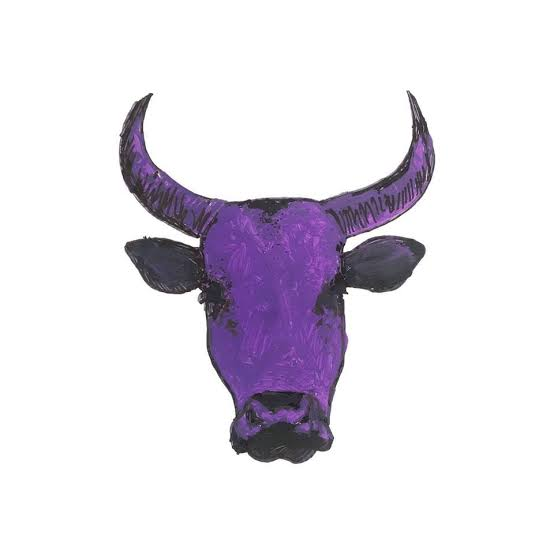
- Leader: Kanthan Pillay
- Founded: 17 March 2019
- Headquarters: Johannesburg
- Ideology: Capitalism; Free market Classical liberalism Libertarianism
- Political position: Right-wing

Website
- capitalist.org.za

The Capitalist Party of South Africa (ZACP) is a South African political party. The party was launched on 17 March 2019 in Johannesburg, South Africa. The party was founded by Kanthan Pillay, Roman Cabanac, Neo Kuaho, Gideon Joubert, Unathi Kwaza, Duncan McLeod, Sindile Vabaza, Louis Nel, Katlego Mabusela and Dumo Denga.

== Core principles ==
The ten core principles of the party were outlined by Kanthan Pillay at its launch on 17 March 2019.

1. Liberty
2. Equality
3. Tolerance and protection of freedom of expression
4. Private property rights protected by law
5. Rule of law
6. Right to work
7. The right to be secure on your own property and to defend yourself against intruders
8. Free market and Free international trade relationships
9. Firearms for self-defence
10. Fraternity

The party's logo is a purple cow designed by South African artist Sarah Britten.

== Election results ==
The party contested the 2019 election at the national level only, failing to win any seats.

=== National elections ===
Election	Total votes	Share of vote	Seats	+/–	Government
2019	15,915	0.09%	0 / 400	–	extraparliamentary

== See also ==
- Political parties in South Africa
