= National Religious Freedom Party =

Political party in South Africa

- National Assembly seats: 0 / 400
- Provincial Legislatures: 0 / 430

National Religious Freedom Party is a minor political party based in Kwazulu-Natal, South Africa.

The party advocates support for traditional leaders, and has been active in campaigning against the dissolution of the Ingonyama Trust.

The party contested the 2019 South African general election at provincial level in Kwazulu-Natal only.

== Election results ==
=== Provincial elections ===
Election	Eastern Cape		Free State		Gauteng		Kwazulu-Natal		Limpopo		Mpumalanga		North-West		Northern Cape		Western Cape	
Election	%	Seats	%	Seats	%	Seats	%	Seats	%	Seats	%	Seats	%	Seats	%	Seats	%	Seats
2019	-	-	-	-	-	-	0.02%	0/80	-	-	-	-	-	-	-	-	-	-
