= African Security Congress =

South African political party

- Founder: Teboho Motloung
- Split from: African National Congress
- Ideology: Security guards' interests
- Political position: Single-issue
- National Assembly seats: 0 / 400
- Provincial Legislatures: 0 / 430

The African Security Congress (ASC) is a South African political party founded to lobby for the interests of private security guards, in particular for government to employ security guards directly.

In November 2017, former African National Congress (ANC) politician Makhosi Khoza, who resigned from the ANC after calling for Jacob Zuma to resign, was invited to be involved with the party in a leadership capacity, and joined a march on behalf of security guards in Germiston.

The party contested the 2019 general election, failing to win a seat.

== Election results ==
=== National Assembly ===
Election	Total votes	Share of vote	Seats	+/–	Government
2019	26,263	0.15	0 / 400	–	extraparliamentary
