= Provincial legislature (South Africa) =

Legislative branch of a South African province

In South Africa, a provincial legislature is the legislative branch of the government of a province. The provincial legislatures are unicameral and vary in size from 30 to 80 members, depending on the registered voting population of the province. Each legislature is chaired by a Speaker and a Deputy Speaker.

== History ==
The original four provinces of South Africa (the provinces that existed from 1910 to 1994) had provincial councils elected by the white population of the provinces. The provincial councils were weak; they appointed an executive council (a provincial cabinet) but could not appoint or remove the Administrator (the executive head) of the province. The Administrators were chosen by the Governor-General (before 1961) or the State President (after 1961). The provincial councils' legislative powers were also strictly limited to specific topics. In 1986, the national Parliament abolished the provincial councils entirely, instead allowing the State President to appoint the whole executive council.

The current provincial legislatures were established by the 1993 Interim Constitution of South Africa upon the creation of the new nine provinces. The 1993 Constitution came into effect (and the provinces came into existence) on 27 April 1994; the election on the same day elected the first provincial legislatures. For the most part, the provincial legislatures have been controlled by the African National Congress. The exceptions are the KwaZulu-Natal Legislature, which was controlled by the Inkatha Freedom Party from 1994 to 2004; and the Western Cape Provincial Parliament, which was controlled by the (New) National Party from 1994 until 2004 (sometimes in coalition with the Democratic Party) and since 2009 has been controlled by the Democratic Alliance.

== Election ==
The Members of the Provincial Legislature (MPLs) are elected by party-list proportional representation with a closed list, using the largest remainder method with the Droop quota to allocate any surplus. The usual term of a provincial legislature is five years. Elections are run by the Independent Electoral Commission, and have been held in 1994, 1999, 2004, 2009, 2014, 2019 and 2024. Although it is not constitutionally required, thus far all the elections have been held simultaneously with elections to the National Assembly.

== Powers ==
The legislature has the power to pass legislation in various fields enumerated in the national constitution; in some fields the legislative power is shared with the national parliament, while in others it is reserved to the province. The fields include such matters as health, education (except universities), agriculture, housing, environmental protection, and development planning. In fields outside the power of a provincial legislature, it may recommend legislation to the National Assembly.

A provincial legislature may also enact a constitution for that province, if two-thirds of the members vote in favour. The powers of the provincial legislature are bound only by the national constitution and the provincial constitution (if one exists).

The provincial legislature of a province chooses the Premier, the head of the provincial executive. The legislature can force the Premier to resign by passing a motion of no confidence, or remove them for misconduct or inability. Although the Executive Council (cabinet) is chosen by the Premier, the legislature may pass a motion of no confidence to force the Premier to reconstitute the Council. A provincial legislature also appoints that province's delegates to the National Council of Provinces, allocating delegates to parties in proportion to the number of seats each party holds in the legislature.

The legislature oversees the administration of the provincial government, and the Premier and the members of the Executive Council are required to report to the legislature on the performance of their responsibilities. The legislature also controls the finances of the provincial government by way of the appropriation bills which determine the provincial budget. The provincial legislature plays an important role in the provincial sphere.

== List of provincial legislatures ==
This list shows nine provincial legislatures and their party composition after the elections of 2024.

Legislature	Seats																			
Legislature	ANC	DA	MK	EFF	IFP	PA	VF+	ActionSA	UDM	ACDP	ATM	ACT	Al Jama-ah	BOSA	GOOD	NCC	NFP	RISE	UAT	Total
Eastern Cape Provincial Legislature	45	11	1	8	0	2	1	0	3	0	1	0	0	0	0	0	0	0	0	72
Free State Legislature	16	7	1	4	0	0	1	0	0	0	0	1	0	0	0	0	0	0	0	30
Gauteng Provincial Legislature	28	22	8	11	1	2	2	3	0	1	0	0	0	1	0	0	0	1	0	80
KwaZulu-Natal Legislature	14	11	37	2	15	0	0	0	0	0	0	0	0	0	0	0	1	0	0	80
Limpopo Legislature	48	4	1	9	0	0	1	0	0	0	0	0	0	0	0	0	0	0	1	64
Mpumalanga Provincial Legislature	27	6	9	7	0	0	1	1	0	0	0	0	0	0	0	0	0	0	0	51
North West Provincial Legislature	23	5	1	7	0	0	1	1	0	0	0	0	0	0	0	0	0	0	0	38
Northern Cape Provincial Legislature	15	7	0	4	0	3	1	0	0	0	0	0	0	0	0	0	0	0	0	30
Western Cape Provincial Parliament	8	24	0	2	0	3	1	0	0	1	0	0	1	0	1	1	0	0	0	42
Totals	224	97	58	54	16	10	9	5	3	2	1	1	1	1	1	1	1	1	1	487
