= Moretele Local Municipality elections =

Local elections in the North West Province, South Africa

The Moretele Local Municipality council consists of fifty members elected by mixed-member proportional representation. Twenty-five councillors are elected by first-past-the-post voting in twenty-five wards, while the remaining twenty-five are chosen from party lists so that the total number of party representatives is proportional to the number of votes received.

In the election of 4 November 2026 the African National Congress (ANC) won a majority of twenty-nine seats.

== Results ==
The following table shows the composition of the council after past elections.

Event	ANC	COPE	DA	EFF	PAC	UCDP	Other	Total
2000 election	39	—	—	—	1	2	1	43
2006 election	41	—	1	—	2	2	1	47
2011 election	46	1	3	—	1	0	4	55
2016 election	38	1	4	8	0	—	1	52
2021 election	35	0	2	9	—	0	6	52
2026 election	29	—	5	5	—	—	11	50

== December 2000 election ==
The following table shows the results of the 2000 election.

Party	Ward			List			Total seats
Party	Votes	%	Seats	Votes	%	Seats	Total seats
African National Congress	30,185	89.03	22	34,030	90.52	17	39
United Christian Democratic Party	2,005	5.91	0	1,771	4.71	2	2
United Democratic Movement	719	2.12	0	990	2.63	1	1
Pan Africanist Congress of Azania	370	1.09	0	804	2.14	1	1
Independent candidates	625	1.84	0				0
Total	33,904	100.00	22	37,595	100.00	21	43
Valid votes	33,904	97.83		37,595	98.13		
Invalid/blank votes	753	2.17		716	1.87		
Total votes	34,657	100.00		38,311	100.00		
Registered voters/turnout	77,462	44.74		77,462	49.46		

== March 2006 election ==
The following table shows the results of the 2006 election.

Party	Ward			List			Total seats
Party	Votes	%	Seats	Votes	%	Seats	Total seats
African National Congress	34,551	82.38	23	35,871	88.82	18	41
Independent candidates	3,262	7.78	1				1
Pan Africanist Congress of Azania	1,500	3.58	0	1,346	3.33	2	2
United Christian Democratic Party	1,389	3.31	0	1,367	3.38	2	2
Democratic Alliance	750	1.79	0	1,144	2.83	1	1
Inkatha Freedom Party	320	0.76	0	282	0.70	0	0
Azanian People's Organisation	169	0.40	0	375	0.93	0	0
Total	41,941	100.00	24	40,385	100.00	23	47
Valid votes	41,941	97.76		40,385	95.79		
Invalid/blank votes	962	2.24		1,773	4.21		
Total votes	42,903	100.00		42,158	100.00		
Registered voters/turnout	87,704	48.92		87,704	48.07		

== May 2011 election ==
The following table shows the results of the 2011 election.

Party	Ward			List			Total seats
Party	Votes	%	Seats	Votes	%	Seats	Total seats
African National Congress	41,346	82.45	27	42,196	84.07	19	46
Democratic Alliance	3,165	6.31	0	2,953	5.88	3	3
National Freedom Party	1,966	3.92	1	1,983	3.95	1	2
African People's Convention	1,853	3.70	0	1,478	2.94	2	2
Pan Africanist Congress of Azania	546	1.09	0	354	0.71	1	1
Congress of the People	291	0.58	0	607	1.21	1	1
African Christian Democratic Party	383	0.76	0	276	0.55	0	0
United Christian Democratic Party	196	0.39	0	274	0.55	0	0
Movement Democratic Party	232	0.46	0	72	0.14	0	0
Independent candidates	170	0.34	0				0
Total	50,148	100.00	28	50,193	100.00	27	55
Valid votes	50,148	98.10		50,193	98.33		
Invalid/blank votes	969	1.90		853	1.67		
Total votes	51,117	100.00		51,046	100.00		
Registered voters/turnout	92,703	55.14		92,703	55.06		

== August 2016 election ==
The following table shows the results of the 2016 election.

Party	Ward			List			Total seats
Party	Votes	%	Seats	Votes	%	Seats	Total seats
African National Congress	36,394	72.03	26	36,751	72.09	12	38
Economic Freedom Fighters	8,030	15.89	0	7,850	15.40	8	8
Democratic Alliance	3,597	7.12	0	3,784	7.42	4	4
Agenda to Citizenry Governors	529	1.05	0	612	1.20	1	1
Congress of the People	340	0.67	0	554	1.09	1	1
African People's Convention	355	0.70	0	408	0.80	0	0
Independent candidates	618	1.22	0				0
Pan Africanist Congress of Azania	207	0.41	0	247	0.48	0	0
Forum for Service Delivery	144	0.28	0	292	0.57	0	0
African Christian Democratic Party	88	0.17	0	228	0.45	0	0
African People's Socialist Party	136	0.27	0	105	0.21	0	0
Inkatha Freedom Party	89	0.18	0	146	0.29	0	0
Total	50,527	100.00	26	50,977	100.00	26	52
Valid votes	50,527	98.07		50,977	97.99		
Invalid/blank votes	996	1.93		1,047	2.01		
Total votes	51,523	100.00		52,024	100.00		
Registered voters/turnout	97,823	52.67		97,823	53.18		

== November 2021 election ==
The following table shows the results of the 2021 election.

Party	Ward			List			Total seats
Party	Votes	%	Seats	Votes	%	Seats	Total seats
African National Congress	25,468	63.35	26	26,922	67.15	9	35
Economic Freedom Fighters	6,265	15.58	0	6,939	17.31	9	9
Democratic Alliance	1,639	4.08	0	1,742	4.34	2	2
Independent candidates	2,246	5.59	0				0
Forum for Service Delivery	964	2.40	0	1,202	3.00	2	2
Agenda to Citizenry Governors	1,092	2.72	0	910	2.27	1	1
African Independent Congress	796	1.98	0	926	2.31	1	1
Defenders of the People	565	1.41	0	475	1.18	1	1
Economic Emancipation Forum	641	1.59	0	59	0.15	1	1
Congress of the People	174	0.43	0	169	0.42	0	0
United Christian Democratic Party	100	0.25	0	159	0.40	0	0
African People's Movement	85	0.21	0	158	0.39	0	0
Inkatha Freedom Party	53	0.13	0	176	0.44	0	0
African Transformation Movement	75	0.19	0	115	0.29	0	0
The People's Voice	31	0.08	0	50	0.12	0	0
Disability and Older Person Political Party	4	0.01	0	58	0.14	0	0
Tsogang Civic Movement	4	0.01	0	33	0.08	0	0
Total	40,202	100.00	26	40,093	100.00	26	52
Valid votes	40,202	97.85		40,093	97.30		
Invalid/blank votes	884	2.15		1,114	2.70		
Total votes	41,086	100.00		41,207	100.00		
Registered voters/turnout	94,713	43.38		94,713	43.51		

=== By-elections from November 2021 ===
The following by-elections were held to fill vacant ward seats in the period since the election in November 2021.

Date	Ward	Party of the previous councillor	Party of the newly elected councillor
13 Mar 2024	17	African National Congress	African National Congress
28 Aug 2024	26	African National Congress	African National Congress

== November 2026 election ==
The following table shows the results of the 2026 election.

Party	Ward			List			Total seats
Party	Votes	%	Seats	Votes	%	Seats	Total seats
African National Congress	28,452	56.24	25	28,555	56.69	4	29
ActionSA	6,289	12.43	0	6,581	13.06	7	7
Economic Freedom Fighters	5,299	10.47	0	5,205	10.33	5	5
Democratic Alliance	4,384	8.67	0	4,436	8.81	5	5
uMkhonto weSizwe Party	1,395	2.76	0	1,374	2.73	2	2
South African Communist Party	1,274	2.52	0	1,105	2.19	1	1
African Independent Congress	857	1.69	0	632	1.25	1	1
Service Delivery Party	332	0.66	0	295	0.59	0	0
Freedom Front Plus	290	0.57	0	283	0.56	0	0
Inkatha Freedom Party	278	0.55	0	245	0.49	0	0
All Citizens Party	249	0.49	0	209	0.41	0	0
African Royal Rainbow Congress	184	0.36	0	238	0.47	0	0
African People's Convention	210	0.42	0	156	0.31	0	0
Afrika Mayibuye Movement	181	0.36	0	176	0.35	0	0
Independent candidates	322	0.64	0				0
Agenda to Citizenry Governors	181	0.36	0	126	0.25	0	0
Bophuthatswana Civil Movement	69	0.14	0	171	0.34	0	0
African Economic Freedom	56	0.11	0	124	0.25	0	0
Economic Emancipation Forum	70	0.14	0	107	0.21	0	0
United Africans Transformation	31	0.06	0	132	0.26	0	0
Active African Christians United Movement	85	0.17	0	54	0.11	0	0
Patriotic Alliance	21	0.04	0	54	0.11	0	0
Restoration Community Forum	30	0.06	0	39	0.08	0	0
Defenders of the People	12	0.02	0	24	0.05	0	0
South African Political Association	5	0.01	0	27	0.05	0	0
Purple Party Ikageng	10	0.02	0	19	0.04	0	0
Poelano Revelation Party	22	0.04	0	6	0.01	0	0
Agang South Africa	4	0.01	0				0
Total	50,592	100.00	25	50,373	100.00	25	50
Valid votes	50,592	97.63		50,373	97.61		
Invalid/blank votes	1,230	2.37		1,234	2.39		
Total votes	51,822	100.00		51,607	100.00		
Registered voters/turnout	107,051	48.41		107,051	48.21		
