= Meagan Chauke =

South African activist (born 1992)

The Honourable Meagan Chauke-Adonis MP

Member of the National Assembly
- Incumbent
- Assumed office 14 June 2024

Personal details
- Born: Tshehofatso Meagan Chauke; 4 September 1992 (age 33) Pretoria, Transvaal; South Africa
- Party: African National Congress
- Spouse: Sikhumbuzo Adonis (m. 2018)
- Education: Pretoria High School for Girls
- Alma mater: University of South Africa
- Nicknames: Megan; Tsheho

Tshehofatso Meagan Chauke-Adonis (née Chauke; born 4 September 1992) is a South African politician, activist, and entrepreneur. She has represented the African National Congress (ANC) in the National Assembly of South Africa since June 2024.

Born in Pretoria, Chauke became a disability activist, content creator, and public speaker after she lost her vision in 2015. She is the chief executive officer of an assistive technology startup called Featherlinx. She joined the National Assembly in the May 2024 general election and is the head of the ANC's disability desk.

== Early life and career ==
Born on 4 September 1992, Chauke was born in Pretoria and grew up in the affluent suburb of Waterkloof. She matriculated at the Pretoria High School for Girls and studied towards a Bachelor of Arts in political science at the University of South Africa.

While a student in 2015 she was diagnosed with total and irreversible vision loss, and she rose to public prominence in subsequent years as a disability activist and social media influencer. Under the moniker "Blind Goddess", she posts vlogs about parenting while blind on TikTok, where she had over 126,000 followers by January 2024. She also founded several companies and charitable organisations, including a non-profit called Disabled Women Living with Dignity.

In 2019 she founded Featherlinx, a Pretoria-based tech company which aims to develop assistive technology for persons with disabilities; it is a member of the GrindstoneX programme, a startup incubator founded by Grindstone Accelerator and Naspers Labs.

== Political career ==
In July 2022, the African National Congress (ANC) announced that Chauke would stand as its candidate in an upcoming by-election in the City of Tshwane Metropolitan Municipality. She stood in Tshwane's Ward 42, a southeastern region comprising Waterkloof and Monument Park, where the incumbent councillor, Phillip Nel of the Democratic Alliance (DA), had died. The by-election was held on 3 August 2022 and the DA held the ward; Chauke lost to Shane Maas, who received 77 per cent of the vote.

In the May 2024 general election, Chauke stood as a parliamentary candidate, ranked 16th on the ANC's national party list. She was elected to a seat in the National Assembly, the lower house of the South African Parliament. She was appointed as a member of the Portfolio Committee on Women, Youth and Persons with Disabilities and as a member of the Portfolio Committee on Communications and Digital Technologies. She is also the convenor of the ANC's internal national disability desk.

== Personal life ==
Chauke's vision loss was caused by permanent optic nerve damage as a complication of idiopathic intracranial hypertension. After suffering persistent unexplained headaches and blackouts, she began losing her vision in January 2015 while awaiting a diagnosis. She has said that she suffered depression and anxiety attacks both while awaiting a diagnosis and after receiving the hypertension diagnosis. She is legally blind but can see light, silhouettes, and some colour, which she describes as "like looking through a blanket of fog".

In 2018 she married Sikhumbuzo Adonis, her boyfriend of five years. They have two sons together, born in 2016 and 2023.
