= Matthew O. Howard =

American professor (1956–2018)

- Born: Matthew Owen Howard; July 21, 1956; Chicago, Illinois
- Died: December 15, 2018 (aged 62)
- Education: Western Washington University; University of Washington
- Known for: Inhalant abuse Mindfulness as a treatment for addiction
- Awards: Fellow of the American Academy of Social Work and Social Welfare since 2013
- Scientific career
- Fields: Social work
- Institutions: Washington University in St. Louis; University of Michigan; University of North Carolina at Chapel Hill
- Thesis: Chemical aversion treatment of alcohol dependence: Magnitude of conditioning and its relation to treatment outcome (1990)
- Doctoral advisor: Roger Roffman
- Doctoral students: Michael G. Vaughn

Matthew Owen Howard (July 21, 1956 – December 15, 2018) was the Frank A. Daniels Distinguished Professor for Human Services Policy Information in the School of Social Work at the University of North Carolina at Chapel Hill, where he also served as the Associate Dean for Doctoral Education. He became a renowned expert in substance use disorders, particularly inhalant abuse, inert gas asphyxiation, and alcohol dependence among youth.

Howard authored nearly 400 publications, which includes more than 300 peer-reviewed articles, book reviews, editorials, government reports, and abstracts. In 2010, he was inducted as a member and fellow of the New York Academy of Medicine. Howard was recognized in 2016 as among the "top 40 social work researchers in the United States who contributed a 'high impact' on social and health issues".

Over the course of his career, Howard served on the editorial boards of nearly 60 academic journals, including appointments as the editor-in-chief of Journal of Addictive Diseases; the Social Work Research, the flagship journal of the National Association of Social Workers; North American editor for the British Journal of Social Work, a publication of the British Association of Social Workers; and associate editor of the Journal of Social Services Research. He was the editor-in-chief of the Journal of Addictive Diseases, as well as the North America editor of the British Journal of Social Work.

Howard earlier was a fellow of the Society for Social Work and Research and the American Academy of Social Work and Welfare, an "honorific society of distinguished scholars and practitioners dedicated to achieving excellence in the field of social work and social welfare through high impact work that advances social good."

Howard grew up in Yakima, Washington, during which time he was involved in music and sports. In high school, he played trombone in the marching band and played on the football and baseball teams. He graduated from Western Washington University, with a B.S. and M.S. in psychology, and earned a master's degree in social work and Ph.D. in social welfare from University of Washington.

After teaching at the University of Washington, Howard joined the faculty at Washington University’s George Warren Brown School of Social Work in St. Louis as an assistant and then associate professor. Later he held dual appointments as full professor at the School of Social Work and the Department of Psychiatry in the School of Medicine at the University of Michigan, Ann Arbor. His last faculty position was at the University of North Carolina at Chapel Hill, where he won several awards for teaching excellence, among them the University's 2014 Distinguished Teaching Award for Post-Baccalaureate Instruction.
