= James Herbert Williams =

African American Social Work Scholar

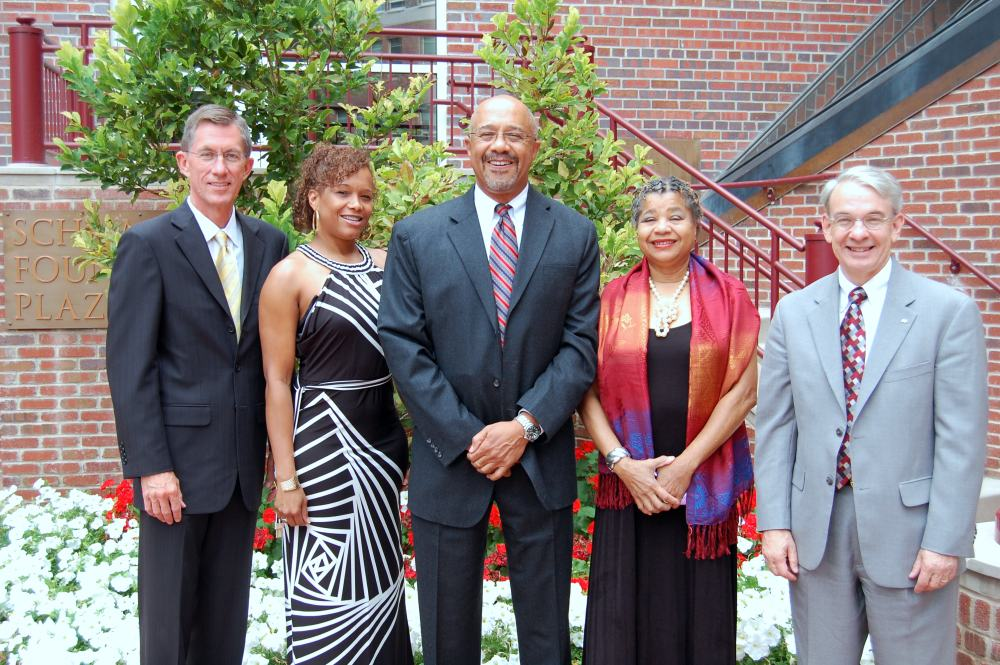
- Photo of Williams being installed as the Morris Endowed Chair, at the University of Denver
- Occupations: Social work scholar; Academic administrator
- Title: Professor of Social Welfare Services and Director of the Center for Child Well-Being (ASU); Dean Emeritus (UD)
- Awards: American Academy of Social Work and Social Welfare (Fellow); Society for Social Work and Research (Fellow); NASW Social Work Pioneer

Academic background
- Education: Grambling State University (BA Soc.); Smith College (MSW); University of Colorado (MPA); University of Washington (PhD)

James Herbert Williams is an American social work scholar and academic administrator. He is the Arizona Centennial Professor of Social Welfare Services and Director of the Center for Child Well-Being at the School of Social Work, Arizona State University, and Dean Emeritus of the University of Denver Graduate School of Social Work.

== Early life and education ==
Williams is an African American who grew up in rural North Carolina where his father worked as a sharecropper and his mother valued education. He earned a BA in Sociology from Grambling State University, an MSW from Smith College, an MPA from the University of Colorado, and a PhD in Social Welfare from the University of Washington.

== Career ==
Williams initially worked in direct practice, including hospital trauma and pediatric care, HIV/AIDS and public-health clinics, schools, and county social services in Colorado and Washington. He subsequently held academic appointments at Washington University in St. Louis, where he earned tenure, held the E. Desmond Lee Professorship of Racial and Ethnic Diversity, and served as associate dean. He then moved to the School of Social Work at Arizona State University for a short time where he held the title as Foundation Professor of Youth and Diversity, before being appointed as Dean and the Milton Morris Endowed Chair at the University of Denver Graduate School of Social Work. He returned to Arizona State University as Director of the School of Social Work (2017–2021) and currently serves as the Arizona Centennial Professor of Social Welfare Services and Director of the Center for Child Well-Being.

== Research and scholarship ==
Williams' scholarship focuses on child and family well-being, youth violence and delinquency prevention, adolescent substance use, health disparities, and access to services in school and community settings. He served as editor in chief of Social Work Research, where he published essays on research directions and evidence production.

=== National leadership ===
Williams has held numerous national leadership positions in social work academia. He served as President of the Society for Social Work and Research (2014–2016), served as the chair of the National Advisory Committee for the Fahs-Beck Fund for Research and Experimentation, and held leadership roles for the American Academy of Social Work and Social Welfare, the Council on Social Work Education, the Grand Challenges for Social Work Initiative, among others.

== International scholarship ==
Williams has held visiting scholar positions in Poland, China, and Taiwan. He delivered the Shanti K. Khinduka Lecture at the 21st International Consortium for Social Development conference in Yogyakarta, has served on the advisory committee for the Katherine A. Kendall Institute for International Social Work Education, and has been active in consulting with the United Nations and NGOS in Africa.

== Awards and honors ==
Among his numerous recognitions include being inducted as a Fellow of the American Academy of Social Work and Social Welfare, and the Society for Social Work and Research, being named an NASW Social Work Pioneer, and alumni distinctions such as the University of Washington School of Social Work Distinguished Alumni Award and Smith College School for Social Work's Day-Garrett Award.
