= South African Rainbow Alliance =

South African political party

- Abbreviation: SARA
- Leader: Colleen Makhubele
- Founder: Colleen Makhubele
- Split from: COPE
- National Assembly: 0 / 400
- Provincial Legislatures: 0 / 430

Website
- sarapolitics.org.za

The South African Rainbow Alliance (SARA) is a South African political party founded in 2023 by Colleen Makhubele, who previously served under Congress of the People (COPE), representing the party as speaker for the City of Johannesburg Metro Council.

== History ==
SARA was initially conceived as an alliance of smaller parties, including the National Freedom Party, African Amalgamated Restorative Movement, and Independent Citizens Movement. Makhubele, while still a representative for COPE, stated that COPE would be part of the alliance, but was later dismissed by COPE, which accused her of lying about COPE's involvement.

In August 2024, Makhubele quite SARA to join MK.

== Election results ==
=== National Assembly elections ===
The party contested the 2024 South African general election.

Election	Party leader	Total votes	Share of vote	Seats	+/–	Government
2024	Colleen Makhubele	4,796	0.03% (Note: From 2024, seats in the National Assembly are determined by a combination of the national ballot, and the nine regional ballots. Only the national ballot figures are shown here.)	0 / 400	Steady	Extra-parliamentary

=== Provincial elections ===
Election	Eastern Cape		Free State		Gauteng		Kwazulu-Natal		Limpopo		Mpumalanga		North-West		Northern Cape		Western Cape	
Election	%	Seats	%	Seats	%	Seats	%	Seats	%	Seats	%	Seats	%	Seats	%	Seats	%	Seats
2024					0.07	0/80			0.05	0/64								

=== Municipal elections ===
The party contested its first municipal election in Madibeng in February 2024, finishing fourth out of the four contesting parties, with 1% of the vote.
