= New York University Silver School of Social Work =

Coordinates: 40.73094°N 73.99565°W

NYU Silver School of Social Work
- Type: Private
- Established: 1960
- Parent institution: New York University
- Dean: Michael A. Lindsey
- Students: 1000+
- Location: New York City, New York, United States
- Website: socialwork.nyu.edu

Silver School of Social Work is the social work school of New York University.

== History ==
=== 1960–2006 ===
NYU offered its first social work courses in 1934. A 10-year, $420,000 commitment by the Lavanburg Corner House helped establish a Department of Social Work in the Graduate School of Public Administration and Social Service in 1953. NYU’s Master of Social Work degree program received initial accreditation from the Council on Social Work Education in 1955.

In 1960, the University established an independent Graduate School of Social Work. In 1973, the school added an undergraduate program and removed the word "graduate" from its name.

In 1980, the school launched a Doctor of Social Welfare program and in 1987, the New York State Education Department authorized the school to grant the PhD degree.

In the early 1990s, the School of Social Work’s building at 3 Washington Square North was joined with 1 and 2 Washington Square North to become the school’s new home. Famed American artist Edward Hopper lived and painted on the fourth floor of 3 Washington Square North from 1913–1967. The school has preserved Hopper’s studio much as it was in his lifetime.

Work on the combined buildings was completed in 1994 and the building was dedicated on September 19, 1994. The school had recently been renamed the "Shirley M. Ehrenkranz School of Social Work" in honor of Dean Shirley M. Ehrenkranz who died on August 25, 1994.

In 2003, the school launched a Division of Lifelong Learning and Professional Development, to coordinate continuing education programs. The Division is now known as the Office of Global and Lifelong Learning.

=== 2006–Present ===
The school was renamed the Silver School of Social Work in honor of NYU Alumni Constance and Martin Silver who pledged $50 million to the School of Social Work in 2007. At the time, it was the largest known donation to a school of social work in the history of the United States. The gift also established the McSilver Institute for Poverty Policy and Research at the school.

In fall 2015, NYU Silver and NYU Shanghai jointly launched an MSW Program at Shanghai and New York. That same year, the School launched a DSW Program in Clinical Social Work.

In June 2021, Constance and Martin Silver gave a new $16 million gift to help NYU Silver and the McSilver Institute leverage data science and Artificial Intelligence for social work's aims. In addition to funding the creation of a Center on Data Science and Social Equity and an endowed professorship in data science and prevention at the school, the gift funded the establishment of an Artificial Intelligence Hub at the McSilver Institute.

In Fall 2023, NYU Silver launched a School Social Work Training Academy for MSW students.

In May 2024, NYU Silver and NYU Abu Dhabi’s Office of Executive Education entered a partnership with the Abu Dhabi Family Care Authority to launch a case management professional development program.

== Research facilities ==
The school is home to several research centers and institutes, including the NYU McSilver Institute for Poverty Policy and Research, Constance and Martin Silver Center on Data Science and Social Equity, Center for Health and Aging Innovation and the Center on Violence and Recovery. In 2006, the school launched the Zelda Foster Studies Program in Palliative and End-of-Life Care, which encompasses a range of initiatives designed to develop and mentor palliative and end-of-life care (PELC) social work leaders at all stages of their careers. It is named after the social worker most closely associated with the modern-day palliative care movement, Zelda Foster, who taught in the school's Post-Masters Certificate Program in PELC from its inception in until months before her death in July 2006.

== Main campus ==
The school's main facilities are located in NYU's Washington Square campus in Greenwich Village. The school's educational, extracurricular, and social hub is housed in three historic townhouses bordering Washington Square Park.

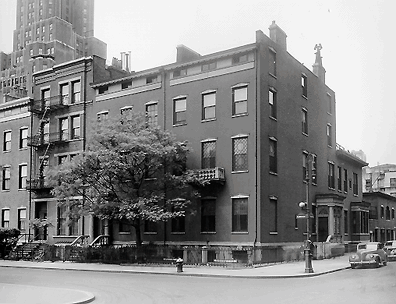
Historic NYUSilver Townhouses.

== Satellite campuses ==
NYU Silver's MSW program is also available on the campus of St. Thomas Aquinas College in Rockland County, New York In addition, the school offers a two-year MSW program at Shanghai and New York, in which students do their first year of coursework and practicum learning at NYU Shanghai and the second at the Washington Square Campus.

== Rankings and reputation ==
In 2024 the school's MSW program was ranked 12th nationally by U.S. News and World Report.

== Notable Faculty and Alumni ==
- Kate Donnally who served as a member of the Vermont House of Representatives, earned her MSW from the school in 2008.
- Mathylde Frontus, former New York State Assembly member and community organizer, earned her BS from NYU Silver in 1998 and her MSW from the school in 1999.
- Linda G. Mills, NYU’s 17th President of NYU, on NYU Silver’s faculty since 1999.
- James Jaccard, psychologist and social work researcher, Professor Emeritus.
- Michael A. Lindsey, mental health researcher and academic, NYU Silver’s Dean and Paulette Goddard Professor Social Work, on NYU Silver’s faculty since 2014
- Deborah K. Padgett, social work professor at NYU Silver known for her expertise in homelessness, mental health services and qualitative and mixed methods research.
- Vincent Schiraldi, juvenile justice policy reformer and Maryland Secretary of Juvenile Services, earned his MSW from the school in 1983.
- Saloni Sethi, Commissioner for the NYC Mayor’s Office to End Domestic and Gender-Based Violence since 2024, earned her MSW from the school in 2013.
- Tricia Shimamura, Commissioner of the New York City Department of Parks & Recreation since 2026, earned her MSW from the school in 2013.
- Darcy Sterling, a relationship expert who was host of the E! reality television series Famously Single, earned her PhD in 2006.
- Jerome C. Wakefield, social work professor and philosopher of psychiatry.

== See also ==
List of social work schools
