= Elizabeth Lightfoot =

Social work scholar

Elizabeth Lightfoot is an American social work scholar, social policy expert, and academic administrator. She is the director and distinguished professor of social policy in the School of Social Work at Arizona State University (ASU), Watts College of Public Service and Community Solutions. Her research focuses on disability policy and services, particularly in relation to child welfare, aging, and health, as well as social work education.

== Early life and education ==
Lightfoot earned a Bachelor of Science in multidisciplinary studies from Santa Clara University, with concentrations in philosophy, sociology, psychology, religious studies, and Spanish. She completed a Master of Social Work (MSW) in human services management at the University of Minnesota. She later received a Ph.D. in public policy from Indiana University Bloomington, through the O’Neill School of Public and Environmental Affairs and the Department of Political Science.

== Career ==
Lightfoot joined the University of Minnesota School of Social Work in 1999, where she served on the faculty for over two decades and directed the school’s Ph.D. program for fifteen years. In 2021, she was appointed director of the School of Social Work at Arizona State University, effective July 1, 2021. At ASU, she also holds the title of Distinguished Professor of Social Policy and teaches doctoral students. She has served in leadership roles with several national organizations, including as Secretary for the Society for Social Work and Research, Board Member of the Council on Social Work Education, and Board Member and Mentorship Chair for the American Academy of Social Work and Social Welfare. She also served as the President for the Group for the Advancement of Doctoral Education in Social Work.

== Research and contributions ==
Lightfoot’s scholarship examines the intersections of disability and social services, particularly child welfare, aging, and health. She has published extensively with international partners and co-led CBPR projects with refugee communities. She has published widely on social work doctoral education and the history and future of the discipline. Lightfoot is a two-time Fulbright Scholar. In 2008, she held a Fulbright at the University of Namibia, and in 2018–2019, she was a Senior Fulbright Scholar at the University of Bucharest in Romania. In 2022, she was named a Fulbright U.S. Scholar Alumni Ambassador, the first social worker to hold that role.

== Policy impact ==
Lightfoot’s work has influenced policy in the United States and internationally. Her research on parents with disabilities and discriminatory child welfare statutes informed the National Council on Disability’s 2012 report Rocking the Cradle: Ensuring the Rights of Parents with Disabilities and Their Children, which underpins later U.S. Department of Justice and the U.S. Department of Health and Human Services joint guidance to child welfare agencies, as well as many other international, federal, and state policy documents. Her studies have also been incorporated into various state and local-level resources for policymakers, advocates, and social workers, and used as evidence in legal proceedings. Her coauthored study on the health effects of volunteering among older adults has been cited in U.S. federal evidence briefs on the health benefits of volunteering as well as international policy documents on volunteerism and health.

== Awards ==
Lightfoot was inducted as a Fellow of the American Academy of Social Work and Social Welfare in 2020. She has also received the Educational Leadership Award from the Group for the Advancement of Doctoral Education.
