= Michael G. Vaughn =

- Education: Truman State University; University of Missouri-St. Louis; Regis University; Washington University in St. Louis
- Awards: Elected a fellow of the American Academy of Social Work and Social Welfare in 2017
- Scientific career
- Fields: Social work criminology epidemiology
- Workplaces: Saint Louis University School of Social Work
- Thesis: Psychopathic Traits in Relation to Substance Use, Delinquency and Mental Health in a State Population of Incarcerated Juvenile Offenders (2005)
- Doctoral advisor: Matthew O. Howard

Michael G. Vaughn is a professor of social work at the School of Social Work in the Saint Louis University School of Social Work where he is also the current (and founding) director of the Ph.D. in social work program.

His research spans multiple disciplines, including criminology, epidemiology, and social work. In 2014, he co-authored a study which found that immigrants are less likely to engage in antisocial behaviors than native-born Americans.

== Career ==
Vaughn has taught at Saint Louis University since 2008. In 2017, he was elected as a fellow of the American Academy of Social Work and Social Welfare.
