= Madibeng Local Municipality elections =

Local elections in the North West Province, South Africa

The Madibeng Local Municipality council consists of eighty-two members elected by mixed-member proportional representation. Forty-one councillors are elected by first-past-the-post voting in twenty wards, while the remaining forty-one are chosen from party lists so that the total number of party representatives is proportional to the number of votes received.

In the election of 4 November 2026 the African National Congress (ANC) lost its majority for the first time, but still won the largest number of seats.

== Results ==
The following table shows the composition of the council after past elections.

Event	ACDP	AIC	ANC	COPE	DA	EFF	FSD	FF+	UCDP	Other	Total
2000 election	1	—	48	—	6	—	—	—	2	3	60
2006 election	1	—	52	—	5	—	—	1	1	2	62
2011 election	1	—	54	1	14	—	—	1	0	1	72
2016 election	0	1	45	1	16	14	2	2	0	0	81
2021 election	1	1	44	0	12	14	1	4	0	5	82
2026 election	1	—	34	—	12	13	—	6	0	16	82

== December 2000 election ==
The following table shows the results of the 2000 election.

Party	Ward			List			Total seats
Party	Votes	%	Seats	Votes	%	Seats	Total seats
African National Congress	51,515	76.23	27	53,435	79.09	21	48
Democratic Alliance	6,884	10.19	3	7,639	11.31	3	6
United Christian Democratic Party	1,986	2.94	0	2,193	3.25	2	2
Independent candidates	2,908	4.30	0				0
United Democratic Movement	1,359	2.01	0	1,377	2.04	1	1
Greater Brits Civic Organisation	1,086	1.61	0	1,241	1.84	1	1
African Christian Democratic Party	1,286	1.90	0	907	1.34	1	1
Noordwes Forum	552	0.82	0	768	1.14	1	1
Total	67,576	100.00	30	67,560	100.00	30	60
Valid votes	67,576	97.66		67,560	98.02		
Invalid/blank votes	1,616	2.34		1,365	1.98		
Total votes	69,192	100.00		68,925	100.00		
Registered voters/turnout	156,043	44.34		156,043	44.17		

== March 2006 election ==
The following table shows the results of the 2006 election.

Party	Ward			List			Total seats
Party	Votes	%	Seats	Votes	%	Seats	Total seats
African National Congress	65,955	82.24	28	65,601	82.93	24	52
Democratic Alliance	6,238	7.78	3	6,089	7.70	2	5
Freedom Front Plus	1,562	1.95	0	1,582	2.00	1	1
United Christian Democratic Party	1,337	1.67	0	1,516	1.92	1	1
African Christian Democratic Party	1,267	1.58	0	1,257	1.59	1	1
African Christian Alliance-Afrikaner Christen Alliansie	1,090	1.36	0	971	1.23	1	1
United Independent Front	606	0.76	0	734	0.93	1	1
United Democratic Movement	590	0.74	0	693	0.88	0	0
Independent candidates	1,237	1.54	0				0
Independent Democrats	223	0.28	0	452	0.57	0	0
People's Progressive Party	95	0.12	0	210	0.27	0	0
Total	80,200	100.00	31	79,105	100.00	31	62
Valid votes	80,200	98.04		79,105	97.95		
Invalid/blank votes	1,600	1.96		1,656	2.05		
Total votes	81,800	100.00		80,761	100.00		
Registered voters/turnout	181,972	44.95		181,972	44.38		

== May 2011 election ==
The following table shows the results of the 2011 election.

Party	Ward			List			Total seats
Party	Votes	%	Seats	Votes	%	Seats	Total seats
African National Congress	78,052	74.08	31	79,553	75.31	23	54
Democratic Alliance	20,923	19.86	5	20,440	19.35	9	14
Congress of the People	2,036	1.93	0	1,965	1.86	1	1
Freedom Front Plus	921	0.87	0	760	0.72	1	1
African Christian Democratic Party	661	0.63	0	583	0.55	1	1
African People's Convention	441	0.42	0	776	0.73	1	1
United Christian Democratic Party	525	0.50	0	548	0.52	0	0
Azanian People's Organisation	248	0.24	0	380	0.36	0	0
Independent candidates	578	0.55	0				0
United Independent Front	290	0.28	0	212	0.20	0	0
Pan Africanist Congress of Azania	310	0.29	0	164	0.16	0	0
Movement Democratic Party	350	0.33	0	117	0.11	0	0
National Freedom Party	25	0.02	0	137	0.13	0	0
Total	105,360	100.00	36	105,635	100.00	36	72
Valid votes	105,360	98.01		105,635	98.40		
Invalid/blank votes	2,134	1.99		1,716	1.60		
Total votes	107,494	100.00		107,351	100.00		
Registered voters/turnout	203,510	52.82		203,510	52.75		

== August 2016 election ==
The following table shows the results of the 2016 election.

Party	Ward			List			Total seats
Party	Votes	%	Seats	Votes	%	Seats	Total seats
African National Congress	63,676	54.90	34	62,254	53.89	11	45
Democratic Alliance	22,820	19.67	6	22,634	19.59	10	16
Economic Freedom Fighters	20,143	17.37	1	19,899	17.23	13	14
Forum for Service Delivery	2,958	2.55	0	3,127	2.71	2	2
Freedom Front Plus	1,867	1.61	0	1,958	1.69	2	2
African Independent Congress	674	0.58	0	2,606	2.26	1	1
Independent candidates	1,738	1.50	0				0
Congress of the People	416	0.36	0	469	0.41	1	1
African People's Convention	246	0.21	0	484	0.42	0	0
United Democratic Movement	209	0.18	0	448	0.39	0	0
Active Movement for Change	223	0.19	0	333	0.29	0	0
United Christian Democratic Party	251	0.22	0	299	0.26	0	0
African Christian Democratic Party	173	0.15	0	338	0.29	0	0
Pan Africanist Congress of Azania	248	0.21	0	172	0.15	0	0
Independent Party	223	0.19	0	149	0.13	0	0
Agang South Africa	58	0.05	0	113	0.10	0	0
Inkatha Freedom Party	18	0.02	0	144	0.12	0	0
Agenda to Citizenry Governors	12	0.01	0	59	0.05	0	0
Building a Cohesive Society	33	0.03	0	32	0.03	0	0
Total	115,986	100.00	41	115,518	100.00	40	81
Valid votes	115,986	98.02		115,518	97.85		
Invalid/blank votes	2,347	1.98		2,540	2.15		
Total votes	118,333	100.00		118,058	100.00		
Registered voters/turnout	224,109	52.80		224,109	52.68		

== November 2021 election ==
The following table shows the results of the 2021 election.

Party	Ward			List			Total seats
Party	Votes	%	Seats	Votes	%	Seats	Total seats
African National Congress	47,233	52.91	36	47,780	53.42	8	44
Economic Freedom Fighters	15,176	17.00	1	15,847	17.72	13	14
Democratic Alliance	12,928	14.48	4	12,658	14.15	8	12
Freedom Front Plus	4,628	5.18	0	4,528	5.06	4	4
Save Madibeng	2,971	3.33	0	3,180	3.56	3	3
Independent candidates	1,884	2.11	0				0
Al Jama-ah	598	0.67	0	586	0.66	1	1
African Independent Congress	375	0.42	0	772	0.86	1	1
Forum for Service Delivery	506	0.57	0	520	0.58	1	1
United Democratic Movement	528	0.59	0	489	0.55	1	1
African Christian Democratic Party	486	0.54	0	414	0.46	1	1
Tsogang Civic Movement	350	0.39	0	504	0.56	0	0
United Christian Democratic Party	248	0.28	0	286	0.32	0	0
Abantu Batho Congress	245	0.27	0	203	0.23	0	0
Active Movement for Change	288	0.32	0	149	0.17	0	0
Inkatha Freedom Party	26	0.03	0	383	0.43	0	0
Defenders of the People	150	0.17	0	178	0.20	0	0
Independent Party	170	0.19	0	119	0.13	0	0
African Transformation Movement	86	0.10	0	197	0.22	0	0
African People's Convention	177	0.20	0	89	0.10	0	0
Congress of the People	42	0.05	0	171	0.19	0	0
United Independent Movement	0	0.00	0	157	0.18	0	0
Agency for New Agenda	68	0.08	0	71	0.08	0	0
International Revelation Congress	56	0.06	0	68	0.08	0	0
African People's Movement	30	0.03	0	51	0.06	0	0
Azanian Independent Community Movement	11	0.01	0	47	0.05	0	0
Azanian People's Organisation	9	0.01	0				0
Total	89,269	100.00	41	89,447	100.00	41	82
Valid votes	89,269	98.17		89,447	98.23		
Invalid/blank votes	1,661	1.83		1,608	1.77		
Total votes	90,930	100.00		91,055	100.00		
Registered voters/turnout	222,804	40.81		222,804	40.87		

=== By-elections from November 2021 ===
The following by-elections were held to fill vacant ward seats in the period since November 2021.

Date	Ward	Party of the previous councillor	Party of the newly elected councillor
23 Aug 2023	25	African National Congress	African National Congress
27 Sep 2023	3	African National Congress	African National Congress
14 Feb 2024	7	African National Congress	African National Congress
15 May 2024	1	African National Congress	African National Congress
28 Aug 2024	17	African National Congress	African National Congress
28 Aug 2024	17	Democratic Alliance	Democratic Alliance

== November 2026 election ==
The following table shows the results of the 2026 election.

Party	Ward			List			Total seats
Party	Votes	%	Seats	Votes	%	Seats	Total seats
African National Congress	50,690	41.29	29	50,941	41.77	5	34
Economic Freedom Fighters	18,952	15.44	3	19,421	15.92	10	13
Democratic Alliance	18,395	14.98	5	18,244	14.96	7	12
Freedom Front Plus	7,934	6.46	1	7,923	6.50	5	6
ActionSA	7,284	5.93	0	8,043	6.59	5	5
South African Communist Party	5,853	4.77	1	5,407	4.43	3	4
uMkhonto weSizwe Party	1,824	1.49	0	1,713	1.40	1	1
Community Independant Party	1,663	1.35	0	1,472	1.21	1	1
Labour Party	1,263	1.03	0	1,240	1.02	1	1
Save South Africa	1,147	0.93	0	1,002	0.82	1	1
Al Jama-ah	1,027	0.84	1	968	0.79	0	1
African Christian Democratic Party	831	0.68	0	921	0.76	1	1
Independent candidates	1,359	1.11	1				1
United Africans Transformation	457	0.37	0	633	0.52	1	1
All Citizens Party	504	0.41	0	356	0.29	0	0
Independent Party	372	0.30	0	441	0.36	0	0
Tsogang Madibeng	391	0.32	0	375	0.31	0	0
African People's Convention	422	0.34	0	328	0.27	0	0
Bophuthatswana Civil Movement	214	0.17	0	366	0.30	0	0
United Democratic Movement	502	0.41	0				0
Afrika Mayibuye Movement	229	0.19	0	224	0.18	0	0
African Transformation Movement	99	0.08	0	346	0.28	0	0
Service Delivery Party	225	0.18	0	200	0.16	0	0
African Economic Freedom	198	0.16	0	216	0.18	0	0
United Christian Democratic Party	75	0.06	0	172	0.14	0	0
Economic Emancipation Forum	89	0.07	0	148	0.12	0	0
Inkatha Freedom Party	70	0.06	0	157	0.13	0	0
Azanian People's Organisation	119	0.10	0	105	0.09	0	0
Active African Christians United Movement	105	0.09	0	111	0.09	0	0
Utlwang Voice of the People	104	0.08	0	102	0.08	0	0
Forum for South Africa	104	0.08	0	90	0.07	0	0
Freedom in South Africa	100	0.08	0	81	0.07	0	0
South African Political Association	41	0.03	0	69	0.06	0	0
Organic Humanity Movement	67	0.05	0	25	0.02	0	0
Patriotic Alliance	8	0.01	0	83	0.07	0	0
Purple Party Ikageng	27	0.02	0	39	0.03	0	0
Agang South Africa	14	0.01	0				0
African Movement Congress	4	0.00	0				0
Total	122,762	100.00	41	121,962	100.00	41	82
Valid votes	122,762	98.01		121,962	97.67		
Invalid/blank votes	2,488	1.99		2,904	2.33		
Total votes	125,250	100.00		124,866	100.00		
Registered voters/turnout	254,573	49.20		254,573	49.05		
