= Saint Louis University College for Public Health and Social Justice =

Saint Louis University College of Public Health and Social Justice
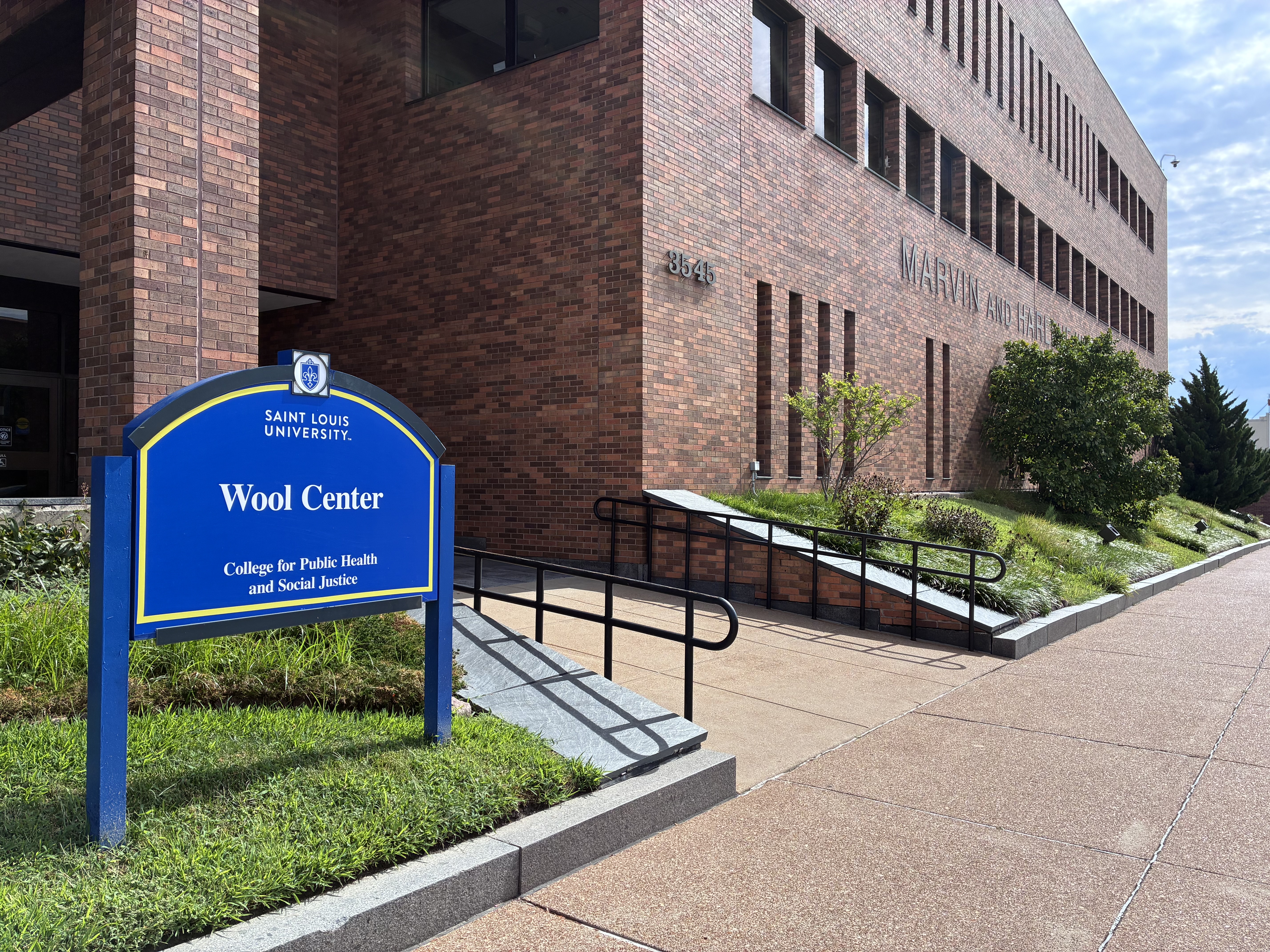
- Marvin and Harlene Wool Center, home of the College for Public Health and Social Justice
- Motto: Health, through justice, for all. Local, regional, and global communities that are healthy, thriving and just.
- Type: Private
- Established: 1991
- Parent institution: Saint Louis University
- Religious affiliation: Roman Catholic - Jesuit
- Dean: Kimberly Enard, Ph.D., has been named interim dean of Saint Louis University’s College for Public Health and Social Justice, effective Sept. 1, 2026
- Students: 613
- Location: The Marvin and Harlene Wool Center, Second Floor, 3545 Lindell Blvd., St. Louis, MO 63103, St. Louis, Missouri, U.S. 38°38′14″N 90°13′53″W
- Campus: Urban
- Website: www.slu.edu/public-health-social-justice/index.php

Saint Louis University College for Public Health and Social Justice is a private undergraduate and graduate program of the Saint Louis University in St. Louis, Missouri. The College for Public Health and Social Justice came to fruition in July 2013 from its previous form as the School of Public Health, which was founded in 1991 and became fully accredited in 1995.

== History ==
Saint Louis University College for Public Health and Social Justice was founded in 2013 by the combining of the School of Social Work, founded in 1930, the School of Public Health, established 1991, and the program in Criminology and Criminal Justice.

== Campus ==
The College for Public Health and Social Justice is located at the Saint Louis University Medical School, across from the university hospital on South Grand, about a mile south of the main campus in St. Louis, Missouri. It is connected to the university by a shuttle bus. The School of Social Work remains on the university's main campus, on Lindell east of Grand.

== Academics ==
=== Degrees ===
St. Louis University's College for Public Health and Social Justice offers six undergraduate degrees, three accelerated degrees, seven master's degrees, thirteen dual-degree masters, one executive master's degree, two Ph.D. degrees, and three certificates. Public health students can also complete first-year and sophomore level coursework at SLU’s campus in Madrid, Spain.

There are four departments and one school of social work:

- Behavioral Science and Health Education
- Biostatistics
- Epidemiology
- Health Management and Policy
- Social Work

=== Accreditation ===
The college is one of 39 schools of public health accredited by the Council on Education for Public Health, the field’s highest accreditation. It is the only accredited school of public health in Missouri and the only school of public health at a Jesuit Catholic university in the United States.

=== Ranking ===
U.S. News & World Report ranked SLU’s Master of Health Administration among the top graduate programs in the country.

== Deans of the School ==
Since the school's founding, its deans have been:

- James Kimmey (1991-1993)
- Richard Kurz (1993-2001)
- William True, interim (2001-2002)
- Andrew Balas (2001-2004)
- Homer Schmitz, interim (2004-2006)
- Connie Evashwick (2006-2007)
- Homer Schmitz, interim (2007-2010)
- Edwin Trevathan (2010-2015)
- Collins O. Airhihenbuwa (2016-2017)
- Thomas Burroughs (July 1, 2017 – 2022)
- Ellen Barnidge, Interim (February 1, 2022 - November 14, 2023)
- Leslie McClure (November 15, 2023 - Present)
