= City of Tshwane elections =

The City of Tshwane Metropolitan Municipality council consists of 214 members elected by mixed-member proportional representation. 107 are elected by first-past-the-post voting in 107 wards, while the remaining 107 are chosen from party lists so that the total number of party representatives is proportional to the number of votes received. In the election of 4th November 2026, no party won a majority of seats on the council.

== Results ==
The following table shows the composition of the council after past elections.

Event	ACDP	ASA	ANC	AZAPO	COPE	DA	EFF	FF+	IFP	PAC	Other	Total
2000 election	3	—	86	0	—	54	—	—	1	2	6	152
2002 floor-crossing	3	—	88	0	—	44	—	—	1	2	14	152
2004 floor-crossing	2	—	93	0	—	47	—	—	1	2	7	152
2006 election	3	—	87	1	—	47	—	7	1	2	4	152
2007 floor-crossing	3	—	87	1	—	47	—	7	2	1	4	152
2011 election	1	—	118	1	2	82	—	4	0	1	1	210
2016 election	1	—	89	0	1	93	25	4	0	1	0	214
2021 election	2	19	75	0	1	69	23	17	1	1	6	214
2026 election	1	48	44	0	0	74	13	17	0	0	17	214

== December 2000 election ==
The following table shows the results of the 2000 election.

Party	Ward			List			Total seats
Party	Votes	%	Seats	Votes	%	Seats	Total seats
African National Congress	230,654	55.39	48	236,654	57.22	38	86
Democratic Alliance	144,690	34.75	27	146,286	35.37	27	54
African Christian Democratic Party	10,000	2.40	0	8,530	2.06	3	3
Vision 2000+	6,551	1.57	0	6,018	1.46	2	2
Independent candidates	11,866	2.85	1				1
Pan Africanist Congress of Azania	3,909	0.94	0	4,854	1.17	2	2
United Christian Democratic Party	2,876	0.69	0	3,848	0.93	1	1
United Democratic Movement	1,986	0.48	0	2,268	0.55	1	1
Inkatha Freedom Party	1,432	0.34	0	1,584	0.38	1	1
Ascora	1,279	0.31	0	1,358	0.33	1	1
Azanian People's Organisation	765	0.18	0	1,143	0.28	0	0
Christen Protestante Party van Suider Afrika	352	0.08	0	1,035	0.25	0	0
Green Party of South Africa	73	0.02	0				0
Total	416,433	100.00	76	413,578	100.00	76	152
Valid votes	416,433	98.63		413,578	98.23		
Invalid/blank votes	5,769	1.37		7,433	1.77		
Total votes	422,202	100.00		421,011	100.00		
Registered voters/turnout	925,884	45.60		925,884	45.47		

=== October 2002 floor crossing ===
In terms of the Eighth Amendment of the Constitution and the judgment of the Constitutional Court in United Democratic Movement v President of the Republic of South Africa and Others, in the period from 8–22 October 2002 councillors had the opportunity to cross the floor to a different political party without losing their seats.

In the Tshwane council, seven councillors crossed from the Democratic Alliance (DA) to the New National Party (NNP), which had formerly been part of the DA, one councillor crossed from the DA to the African National Congress (ANC), and two councillors left the DA to sit as independents. The two councillors of Vision 2000+ crossed to the Christian Democratic Party; the single United Democratic Movement councillor crossed to the United Christian Democratic Party; and one independent councillor joined the ANC.

Party	Seats before	Net change	Seats after
African National Congress	86	▲2	88
Democratic Alliance	54	▼10	44
New National Party	–	▲7	7
African Christian Democratic Party	3	0	3
Independent	1	▲1	2
Pan Africanist Congress of Azania	2	0	2
Christian Democratic Party	—	▲2	2
United Christian Democratic Party	1	▲1	2
Inkatha Freedom Party	1	0	1
Ascora	1	0	1
Vision 2000+	2	▼2	0
United Democratic Movement	1	▼1	0

=== By-elections from October 2002 to August 2004 ===
The following by-elections were held to fill vacant ward seats in the period between the floor crossing periods in October 2002 and September 2004.

Date	Ward	Party of the previous councillor	Party of the newly elected councillor
22 January 2003	40	Democratic Alliance	Democratic Alliance
19 March 2003	53	New National Party (Note: The former ward councillor was elected for the Democratic Alliance but had subsequently crossed the floor to the New National Party.)	Democratic Alliance
23 June 2004	1	Democratic Alliance	Democratic Alliance
23 June 2004	44	Democratic Alliance	Democratic Alliance
23 June 2004	69	Democratic Alliance	Democratic Alliance

=== September 2004 floor crossing ===
Another floor-crossing period occurred on 1–15 September 2004. Five councillors crossed from the NNP to the ANC, while the remaining NNP councillor crossed to the Freedom Front Plus. One councillor crossed from the African Christian Democratic Party to the Independent Democrats, one crossed from the Christian Democratic Party to the DA, and one crossed from the Pan Africanist Congress to the DA.

Party	Seats before	Net change	Seats after
African National Congress	88	▲5	93
Democratic Alliance	45	▲2	47
African Christian Democratic Party	3	▼1	2
Independent	2	0	2
United Christian Democratic Party	2	0	2
Pan Africanist Congress of Azania	2	▼1	1
Christian Democratic Party	2	▼1	1
Inkatha Freedom Party	1	0	1
Ascora	1	0	1
Independent Democrats	—	▲1	1
Freedom Front Plus	—	▲1	1
New National Party	6	▼6	0

=== By-elections from September 2004 to February 2006 ===
The following by-elections were held to fill vacant ward seats in the period between the floor crossing periods in September 2004 and the election in March 2006.

Date	Ward	Party of the previous councillor	Party of the newly elected councillor
26 January 2005	71	African National Congress	African National Congress
7 September 2005	48	African National Congress	African National Congress

== March 2006 election ==
The following table shows the results of the 2006 election.

Party	Ward			List			Total seats
Party	Votes	%	Seats	Votes	%	Seats	Total seats
African National Congress	239,923	55.39	52	247,470	57.32	35	87
Democratic Alliance	132,926	30.69	24	132,528	30.70	23	47
Freedom Front Plus	19,300	4.46	0	19,172	4.44	7	7
African Christian Democratic Party	8,954	2.07	0	8,465	1.96	3	3
Pan Africanist Congress of Azania	5,733	1.32	0	4,553	1.05	2	2
Independent candidates	9,861	2.28	0				0
Independent Democrats	3,201	0.74	0	4,059	0.94	1	1
United Christian Democratic Party	2,704	0.62	0	3,149	0.73	1	1
African Christian Alliance	1,057	0.24	0	1,951	0.45	1	1
Inkatha Freedom Party	1,484	0.34	0	1,409	0.33	1	1
Azanian People's Organisation	1,334	0.31	0	1,389	0.32	1	1
Christian Democratic Party	1,284	0.30	0	1,323	0.31	1	1
United Democratic Movement	1,020	0.24	0	1,459	0.34	0	0
Soshanguve Civic Association	975	0.23	0	1,068	0.25	0	0
National Democratic Convention	910	0.21	0	1,067	0.25	0	0
Ascora	625	0.14	0	1,017	0.24	0	0
United Independent Front	611	0.14	0	869	0.20	0	0
Federal Alliance	595	0.14	0	808	0.19	0	0
United Community Independent Party	681	0.16	0				0
Total	433,178	100.00	76	431,756	100.00	76	152
Valid votes	433,178	98.77		431,756	98.53		
Invalid/blank votes	5,404	1.23		6,447	1.47		
Total votes	438,582	100.00		438,203	100.00		
Registered voters/turnout	1,064,759	41.19		1,064,759	41.16		

=== By-elections from March 2006 to August 2007 ===
The following by-elections were held to fill vacant ward seats in the period between the election in March 2006 and the floor crossing period in September 2007.

Date	Ward	Party of the previous councillor	Party of the newly elected councillor
15 November 2006	37	African National Congress	African National Congress

=== September 2007 floor crossing ===
The final floor-crossing period occurred on 1–15 September 2007; floor-crossing was subsequently abolished in 2008 by the Fifteenth Amendment of the Constitution. In the Tshwane council one councillor crossed from the Pan Africanist Congress to the African People's Convention, and one councillor crossed from the Independent Democrats to the Inkatha Freedom Party.

Party	Seats before	Net change	Seats after
African National Congress	87	0	87
Democratic Alliance	47	0	47
Freedom Front Plus	7	0	7
African Christian Democratic Party	3	0	3
Inkatha Freedom Party	1	▲1	2
Pan Africanist Congress of Azania	2	▼1	1
United Christian Democratic Party	1	0	1
African Christian Alliance	1	0	1
Azanian People's Organisation	1	0	1
Christian Democratic Party	1	0	1
African People's Convention	—	▲1	1
Independent Democrats	1	▼1	0

=== By-elections from September 2007 to May 2011 ===
The following by-elections were held to fill vacant ward seats in the period between the floor crossing period in September 2007 and the election in May 2011.

Date	Ward	Party of the previous councillor	Party of the newly elected councillor
28 November 2007	59	Democratic Alliance	Democratic Alliance
16 July 2008	55	Democratic Alliance	Democratic Alliance
10 December 2008	22	African National Congress	African National Congress
2 September 2009	76	African National Congress	African National Congress
5 May 2010	74	African National Congress	African National Congress

== May 2011 election ==
The following table shows the results of the 2011 election. The council was expanded from 152 to 210 members, partly as a consequence of the annexation of the former Metsweding District Municipality to the City of Tshwane.

Party	Ward			List			Total seats
Party	Votes	%	Seats	Votes	%	Seats	Total seats
African National Congress	391,954	54.18	68	408,413	56.46	50	118
Democratic Alliance	278,998	38.56	37	280,288	38.74	45	82
Freedom Front Plus	12,485	1.73	0	11,511	1.59	4	4
Independent candidates	16,833	2.33	0				0
Congress of the People	6,661	0.92	0	6,432	0.89	2	2
African Christian Democratic Party	4,880	0.67	0	4,267	0.59	1	1
African People's Convention	2,529	0.35	0	3,335	0.46	1	1
Pan Africanist Congress of Azania	2,014	0.28	0	1,813	0.25	1	1
Azanian People's Organisation	1,495	0.21	0	1,308	0.18	1	1
United Christian Democratic Party	894	0.12	0	1,085	0.15	0	0
Inkatha Freedom Party	907	0.13	0	848	0.12	0	0
Christian Democratic Party	925	0.13	0	774	0.11	0	0
African Christian Alliance	1,002	0.14	0	633	0.09	0	0
United Democratic Movement	426	0.06	0	648	0.09	0	0
Independent Ratepayers Association of SA	358	0.05	0	674	0.09	0	0
Christian Front	458	0.06	0	301	0.04	0	0
National Freedom Party	119	0.02	0	491	0.07	0	0
Black Consciousness Party	244	0.03	0	353	0.05	0	0
Movement Democratic Party	290	0.04	0	244	0.03	0	0
Total	723,472	100.00	105	723,418	100.00	105	210
Valid votes	723,472	98.62		723,418	98.74		
Invalid/blank votes	10,091	1.38		9,213	1.26		
Total votes	733,563	100.00		732,631	100.00		
Registered voters/turnout	1,326,427	55.30		1,326,427	55.23		

=== By-elections from May 2011 to August 2016 ===
The following by-elections were held to fill vacant ward seats in the period between the elections in May 2011 and August 2016.

Date	Ward	Party of the previous councillor	Party of the newly elected councillor
7 September 2011	78	Democratic Alliance	Democratic Alliance
15 February 2012	28	African National Congress	African National Congress
15 February 2012	80	African National Congress	African National Congress
7 November 2012	8	African National Congress	African National Congress
28 May 2014	27	African National Congress	African National Congress
28 May 2014	58	Democratic Alliance	Democratic Alliance
13 August 2014	52	Democratic Alliance	Democratic Alliance
17 September 2014	88	African National Congress	African National Congress
19 August 2015	55	Democratic Alliance	Democratic Alliance
11 November 2015	16	African National Congress	African National Congress
20 January 2016	42	Democratic Alliance	Democratic Alliance

== August 2016 election ==
The following table shows the results of the 2016 election.

Party	Ward			List			Total seats
Party	Votes	%	Seats	Votes	%	Seats	Total seats
Democratic Alliance	381,146	43.20	39	381,044	43.10	54	93
African National Congress	361,950	41.02	68	366,702	41.48	21	89
Economic Freedom Fighters	102,511	11.62	0	102,895	11.64	25	25
Freedom Front Plus	17,789	2.02	0	17,421	1.97	4	4
African Christian Democratic Party	4,553	0.52	0	4,168	0.47	1	1
Independent candidates	5,185	0.59	0				0
Congress of the People	2,347	0.27	0	1,975	0.22	1	1
Pan Africanist Congress of Azania	1,767	0.20	0	1,269	0.14	1	1
African People's Convention	417	0.05	0	2,151	0.24	0	0
United Democratic Movement	889	0.10	0	1,157	0.13	0	0
African Mandate Congress	504	0.06	0	786	0.09	0	0
Azanian People's Organisation	693	0.08	0	543	0.06	0	0
African Christian Alliance	561	0.06	0	654	0.07	0	0
Patriotic Alliance	421	0.05	0	781	0.09	0	0
Inkatha Freedom Party	220	0.02	0	862	0.10	0	0
Christian Democratic Party	530	0.06	0	506	0.06	0	0
Agang South Africa	194	0.02	0	392	0.04	0	0
Forum for Service Delivery	194	0.02	0	360	0.04	0	0
African People's Socialist Party	251	0.03	0	164	0.02	0	0
United Front of Civics	79	0.01	0	184	0.02	0	0
Movement Democratic Party	25	0.00	0	79	0.01	0	0
United Christian Democratic Party	48	0.01	0				0
Total	882,274	100.00	107	884,093	100.00	107	214
Valid votes	882,274	98.86		884,093	98.86		
Invalid/blank votes	10,193	1.14		10,224	1.14		
Total votes	892,467	100.00		894,317	100.00		
Registered voters/turnout	1,512,524	59.01		1,512,524	59.13		

=== By-elections from August 2016 to November 2021 ===
The following by-elections were held to fill vacant ward seats in the period between the elections in August 2016 and November 2021.

Date	Ward	Party of the previous councillor	Party of the newly elected councillor
25 April 2018	47	Democratic Alliance	Democratic Alliance
5 September 2018	37	African National Congress	African National Congress
31 October 2018	9	African National Congress	African National Congress
12 December 2018	19	African National Congress	African National Congress
19 May 2021 (Note: By-election was delayed due to the COVID-19 pandemic.)	3	Democratic Alliance	Democratic Alliance
19 May 2021	9	African National Congress	African National Congress
19 May 2021	24	African National Congress	African National Congress
19 May 2021	26	African National Congress	African National Congress
19 May 2021	30	African National Congress	African National Congress
19 May 2021	44	Democratic Alliance	Democratic Alliance
19 May 2021	58	African National Congress	African National Congress
19 May 2021	88	African National Congress	African National Congress
19 May 2021	92	Democratic Alliance	Democratic Alliance

== November 2021 election ==
The following table shows the results of the 2021 election.

Party	Ward			List			Total seats
Party	Votes	%	Seats	Votes	%	Seats	Total seats
African National Congress	231,520	34.42	70	234,521	34.84	5	75
Democratic Alliance	217,190	32.29	37	213,852	31.77	32	69
Economic Freedom Fighters	73,605	10.94	0	70,228	10.43	23	23
ActionSA	53,712	7.99	0	62,502	9.28	19	19
Freedom Front Plus	53,506	7.96	0	52,458	7.79	17	17
African Christian Democratic Party	6,281	0.93	0	6,094	0.91	2	2
Independent candidates	9,623	1.43	0				0
African Independent Congress	2,581	0.38	0	5,442	0.81	1	1
Defenders of the People	3,879	0.58	0	3,291	0.49	1	1
Patriotic Alliance	3,525	0.52	0	3,219	0.48	1	1
Congress of the People	1,351	0.20	0	1,246	0.19	1	1
Pan Africanist Congress of Azania	1,194	0.18	0	1,393	0.21	1	1
Republican Conference of Tshwane	1,700	0.25	0	869	0.13	1	1
African Transformation Movement	1,109	0.16	0	1,197	0.18	1	1
Good	1,131	0.17	0	1,065	0.16	1	1
Inkatha Freedom Party	596	0.09	0	1,385	0.21	1	1
African Mandate Congress	677	0.10	0	1,244	0.18	0	0
United Independent Movement	491	0.07	0	1,173	0.17	0	0
Africa Restoration Alliance	952	0.14	0	659	0.10	0	0
Christian Democratic Party	741	0.11	0	614	0.09	0	0
Concern	748	0.11	0	568	0.08	0	0
Abantu Batho Congress	526	0.08	0	768	0.11	0	0
Party of Action	500	0.07	0	763	0.11	0	0
United Democratic Movement	494	0.07	0	760	0.11	0	0
African Covenant	641	0.10	0	455	0.07	0	0
Azanian People's Organisation	664	0.10	0	384	0.06	0	0
Al Jama-ah	341	0.05	0	576	0.09	0	0
Arusha Economic Coalition	345	0.05	0	547	0.08	0	0
Agang South Africa				761	0.11	0	0
Economic Emancipation Forum	344	0.05	0	404	0.06	0	0
The People's Voice	376	0.06	0	351	0.05	0	0
African People's Convention	294	0.04	0	425	0.06	0	0
Federal Party SA	354	0.05	0	329	0.05	0	0
United Christian Democratic Party	37	0.01	0	624	0.09	0	0
Activists Movement of South Africa	290	0.04	0	350	0.05	0	0
Black First Land First	246	0.04	0	388	0.06	0	0
The Organic Humanity Movement	325	0.05	0	271	0.04	0	0
Democratic Artists Party	35	0.01	0	412	0.06	0	0
Forum for Service Delivery	190	0.03	0	234	0.03	0	0
National Freedom Party	99	0.01	0	292	0.04	0	0
God Save Africa	23	0.00	0	210	0.03	0	0
Agency for New Agenda				222	0.03	0	0
Spectrum National Party	132	0.02	0	82	0.01	0	0
United Cultural Movement	29	0.00	0	152	0.02	0	0
South African Royal Kingdoms Organization	5	0.00	0	167	0.02	0	0
Poelano Revelation Party	8	0.00	0	142	0.02	0	0
Bolsheviks Party of South Africa	54	0.01	0	76	0.01	0	0
Active Movement for Change	51	0.01	0				0
Khoisan Kingdom and All People	38	0.01	0				0
Disability and Older Person Political Party	27	0.00	0				0
Cape Coloured Congress	23	0.00	0				0
Total	672,603	100.00	107	673,165	100.00	107	214
Valid votes	672,603	98.84		673,165	98.70		
Invalid/blank votes	7,918	1.16		8,843	1.30		
Total votes	680,521	100.00		682,008	100.00		
Registered voters/turnout	1,526,585	44.58		1,526,585	44.68		

=== By-elections from November 2021 ===
The following by-elections were held to fill vacant ward seats in the period since November 2021.

Date	Ward	Party of the previous councillor	Party of the newly elected councillor
4 May 2022	96	Democratic Alliance	Democratic Alliance
3 Aug 2022	105	Democratic Alliance	Democratic Alliance
5 Apr 2023	42	African National Congress	African National Congress
28 Jun 2023	83	Democratic Alliance	Democratic Alliance
8 Nov 2023	47	Democratic Alliance	Democratic Alliance
8 Nov 2023	64	Democratic Alliance	Democratic Alliance
24 Apr 2024	2	Democratic Alliance	Democratic Alliance
28 Aug 2024	92	Democratic Alliance	Democratic Alliance
23 Oct 2024	84	Democratic Alliance	Democratic Alliance
25 Jun 2025	56	Democratic Alliance	Democratic Alliance
9 Jul 2025	44	Democratic Alliance	Democratic Alliance
9 Jul 2025	98	Democratic Alliance	Democratic Alliance
1 Oct 2025	10	African National Congress	African National Congress
21 Jan 2026	57	Democratic Alliance	Democratic Alliance

== November 2026 election ==
The following table shows the results of the 2026 election.

Party	Ward			List			Total seats
Party	Votes	%	Seats	Votes	%	Seats	Total seats
Democratic Alliance	311,175	34.71	37	304,519	34.03	37	74
ActionSA	184,884	20.62	26	210,443	23.52	22	48
African National Congress	181,405	20.24	44	180,863	20.21	0	44
Freedom Front Plus	69,206	7.72	0	67,440	7.54	17	17
Economic Freedom Fighters	53,260	5.94	0	50,088	5.60	13	13
uMkhonto weSizwe Party	18,959	2.11	0	16,173	1.81	4	4
South African Communist Party	12,151	1.36	0	9,130	1.02	3	3
Patriotic Alliance	6,425	0.72	0	5,258	0.59	2	2
Rise Mzansi	5,441	0.61	0	4,809	0.54	1	1
Security Personnel Party of South Africa	5,271	0.59	0	4,112	0.46	1	1
African Independent Congress	4,645	0.52	0	2,953	0.33	1	1
African Christian Democratic Party	2,173	0.24	0	3,568	0.40	1	1
Afrika Mayibuye Movement	2,990	0.33	0	2,517	0.28	1	1
Independent candidates	5,397	0.60	0				0
African Transformation Movement	1,767	0.20	0	3,020	0.34	1	1
Build One South Africa	2,242	0.25	0	1,763	0.20	1	1
Service Delivery Party	2,115	0.24	0	1,248	0.14	1	1
United Africans Transformation	1,162	0.13	0	2,125	0.24	1	1
United Progressive People Alliance	1,706	0.19	0	1,344	0.15	0	0
Pan Africanist Congress of Azania	1,562	0.17	0	1,447	0.16	0	0
Inkatha Freedom Party	1,371	0.15	0	1,595	0.18	0	0
African Heart Congress	1,500	0.17	0	1,455	0.16	0	0
African People's Convention	1,560	0.17	0	1,157	0.13	0	0
Concern	1,399	0.16	0	1,276	0.14	0	0
Al Jama-ah	890	0.10	0	1,086	0.12	0	0
Azanian People's Organisation	951	0.11	0	667	0.07	0	0
Congress of the People	839	0.09	0	618	0.07	0	0
International Revelation Congress	563	0.06	0	659	0.07	0	0
Allied Independents Umbrella	675	0.08	0	530	0.06	0	0
Economic Liberators Forum South Africa	701	0.08	0	499	0.06	0	0
Agang South Africa	547	0.06	0	612	0.07	0	0
Economic Emancipation Forum	600	0.07	0	551	0.06	0	0
Batho Pele Community Service Delivery Tshwane	605	0.07	0	523	0.06	0	0
South African Mass Movement	569	0.06	0	493	0.06	0	0
Active African Christians United Movement	404	0.05	0	632	0.07	0	0
Africa Restoration Alliance	507	0.06	0	453	0.05	0	0
Resident Development	830	0.09	0				0
Independent Citizens Movement	403	0.04	0	416	0.05	0	0
United Democratic Movement	813	0.09	0				0
African Royal Rainbow Congress	94	0.01	0	712	0.08	0	0
Republican Conference of Tshwane	463	0.05	0	313	0.03	0	0
Defenders of the People	124	0.01	0	636	0.07	0	0
Moshabi Party	275	0.03	0	485	0.05	0	0
Freedom in South Africa	362	0.04	0	371	0.04	0	0
All Citizens Party	425	0.05	0	295	0.03	0	0
Truth and Solidarity Movement	412	0.05	0	302	0.03	0	0
Bolsheviks Party of South Africa	318	0.04	0	250	0.03	0	0
Operation Dudula	199	0.02	0	317	0.04	0	0
Arusha Economic Coalition	327	0.04	0	160	0.02	0	0
United Residents Front	222	0.02	0	255	0.03	0	0
Bophuthatswana Civil Movement	168	0.02	0	306	0.03	0	0
African Independent People's Organisation	37	0.00	0	427	0.05	0	0
Ekhethu Peoples Party	251	0.03	0	193	0.02	0	0
United Independent Movement	299	0.03	0	144	0.02	0	0
Progressive Tshwane Alliance-Pta012	260	0.03	0	168	0.02	0	0
Organic Humanity Movement	240	0.03	0	178	0.02	0	0
Know Your Power	250	0.03	0	144	0.02	0	0
Minority Front	227	0.03	0	154	0.02	0	0
Africa Redemption Democracy	186	0.02	0	190	0.02	0	0
Abafuna Ingubo Yeskhethu Party	141	0.02	0	225	0.03	0	0
South African Party	75	0.01	0	287	0.03	0	0
United Christian Democratic Party				341	0.04	0	0
Land Party	152	0.02	0	172	0.02	0	0
Federal Party SA	211	0.02	0	110	0.01	0	0
National Freedom Party	48	0.01	0	271	0.03	0	0
National Democratic Convention	141	0.02	0	166	0.02	0	0
National Coloured Congress	172	0.02	0	99	0.01	0	0
Poelano Revelation Party	157	0.02	0	71	0.01	0	0
African Traditional Congres	15	0.00	0	211	0.02	0	0
Region 7 New Generation Party	95	0.01	0	124	0.01	0	0
Gaza Democratic Front	23	0.00	0	155	0.02	0	0
Christ Kingdom Party	14	0.00	0	157	0.02	0	0
Ilizwe Nathi	26	0.00	0	129	0.01	0	0
Tau Dia Rora Cultural and Traditional Lekgotla	101	0.01	0	49	0.01	0	0
Economic Redress Movement	27	0.00	0	110	0.01	0	0
Lekwe Bepe Kingdom Party	43	0.00	0	81	0.01	0	0
Mawusa Movement Party	121	0.01	0				0
African Renaissance Unity	94	0.01	0				0
African Liberation Alliance Movement	14	0.00	0				0
Afrika Unite Congress	2	0.00	0				0
Total	896,474	100.00	107	894,800	100.00	107	214
Valid votes	896,474	98.39		894,800	98.50		
Invalid/blank votes	14,665	1.61		13,672	1.50		
Total votes	911,139	100.00		908,472	100.00		
Registered voters/turnout	1,684,463	54.09		1,684,463	53.93		
