= Deborah K. Padgett =

American academic

Deborah K. Padgett is an American professor of social work at New York University Silver School of Social Work since 1988. A PhD holder in anthropology from the University of Wisconsin–Milwaukee, she is known for research contributing to the evidence base for the Housing First approach to homelessness as well as her expertise in mental health services and qualitative and mixed methods research. A 2021 study by researchers from Elsevier, SciTech Strategies, Inc., and Stanford University ranked Padgett in the top 2% of most cited scientists in 22 scientific fields and 176 sub-fields. In 2019, she was ranked in the top 100 contemporary social work faculty for their scholarly influence in an analysis published in the Journal of Social Service Research.

== Academic research ==
Padgett has advised municipalities, states and countries on implementing Housing First, including Brazil's Ministry of Human Rights and Georgia State Legislature's Mental Health Caucus In describing the Housing First approach to Semafor, Padgett said, "The idea is immediate access to housing, and then work on problems...instead of putting housing at the end of the staircase and you have to prove your worthiness." The impact of this approach was evident in a small qualitative study she led, involving in-depth interviews with unsheltered homeless people who were moved from the streets into private, FEMA-funded hotel rooms at the beginning of COVID-19. She told The Washington Post, that the results were "revelatory" with the participants reporting improvements in health, sleep, personal hygiene, privacy, safety, nutrition, and overall well-being.

== Works ==
Padgett is the author of Qualitative Methods in Social Work Research (3rd ed., 2016) and Qualitative and Mixed Methods in Public Health (2012). She served on an expert panel convened by the National Institutes of Health Office of Behavioral and Social Sciences Research to review and make recommendations on its 2018 report Best Practices for Mixed Methods Research in the Health Sciences. She also co-authored the National Cancer Institute's 2018 white paper, Qualitative Methods In Implementation Science.

Padgett also co-authored Program Evaluation (6th ed., 2015), published by Cengage Group. which led to her appointment to the National Academies of Sciences, Engineering, and Medicine Committee to Evaluate the Department of Veterans Affairs Mental Health Services. NASEM released a consensus report based on the committee findings in 2018.

== Honors and awards ==
Padgett is a fellow of the American Academy of Social Work and Social Welfare and a fellow of the Society for Social Work and Research (SSWR), where she served as the president from 2004–2006. Since 2007, SSWR has recognized her contributions to the field with the presentation of the annual Deborah K. Padgett Early Career Achievement Award.

Padgett received NYU's Distinguished Teaching Award in 2013. In 2019, she was co-recipient of the journal Affilia's Award for Distinguished Feminist Scholarship and Praxis in Social Work.
