= Michael Lindsay (disambiguation) =

Michael Lindsay (1963–2019) was an American voice actor.

Michael Lindsay may also refer to:

- D. Michael Lindsay (born 1971), sociologist
- Michael Lindsay-Hogg (born 1940), American director
- Michael Lindsay, 2nd Baron Lindsay of Birker (1909–1994), British peer and academic
- a pseudonym used by historian and hoaxer A. D. Harvey
- Mike Lindsay (1938–2019), British athlete

== See also ==
- Michael Lindsey (born 1987), American football player
- Michael A. Lindsey, American scholar and college administrator
