= James Jaccard =

James Jay Jaccard (born September 13, 1949) is an American psychologist and social work researcher. He is a Professor Emeritus of Social Work at New York University Silver School of Social Work. He received his Ph.D. from the University of Illinois at Urbana–Champaign in 1976. He helped to design the National Longitudinal Study of Adolescent to Adult Health (also known as Add Health). In 2016, he was inducted into the American Academy of Social Work and Social Welfare. Jaccard was ranked second among social work scholars worldwide for lifetime productivity, quality, and impact, according to ScholarGPS’ Highly Ranked Scholars 2022.
