= Darcy Sterling =

American columnist and social worker

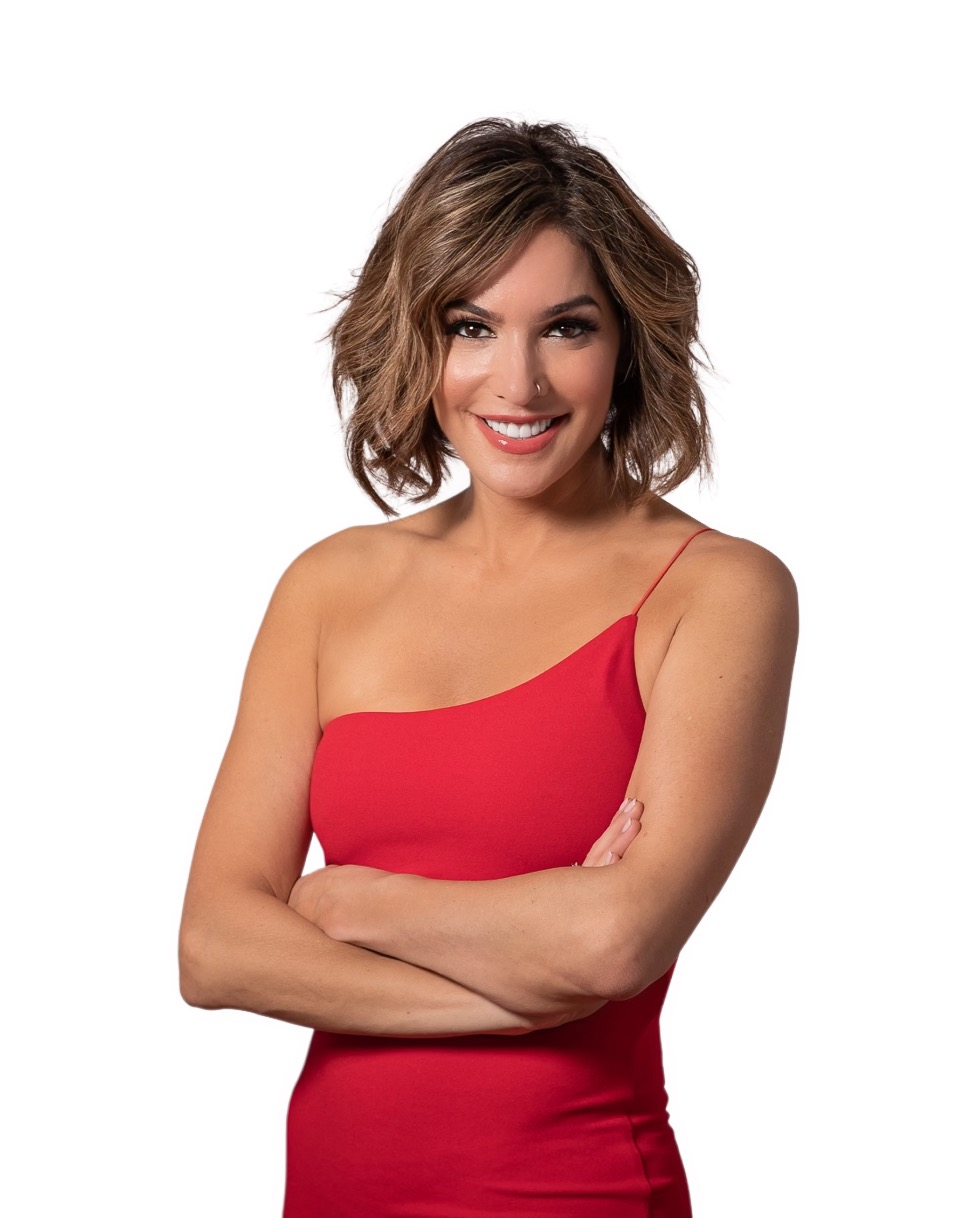
- Born: Darcy Smith; September 16, 1969 (age 56); Livingston, NJ
- Education: Columbia University; New York University
- Occupations: Clinical social worker; relationship expert; TV personality
- Years active: 1996–present
- Spouse: Stephanie Koncicki (m. 2009)
- Website: askdrdarcy.com

Darcy Sterling (born Darcy Smith, September 16, 1969) is an American clinical social worker, relationship expert and television personality. She co-owns the New York City-based group practice Alternatives Counseling. Sterling is the host and relationship expert on the E! network series Famously Single, and the former Global Ambassador for the dating app,Tinder. One of the most widely quoted relationship therapists in the country, Sterling frequently contributes expert advise to national outlets including Forbes, Cosmopolitan, Condé Nast, HuffPost, and many more publications. Sterling is a member of the LGBTQ community.

== Early life and education ==
Sterling was born in Livingston, New Jersey. She graduated from Columbia University in 1996 with a master's degree in social work, and received a Ph.D. from New York University Silver School of Social Work in 2006.

== Career ==
=== Counseling ===
Sterling began practicing as a clinical social worker in 1996. Two years later, she formed Alternatives Counseling in New Jersey. Now located in New York City, the practice specializes in teaching relationship skills to individuals and couples, with an emphasis on positive psychology and Imago relationship therapy.

=== Press ===
Sterling writes an advice blog, Ask Dr. Darcy, which appears on her website. It was featured in GO magazine from 2008 to 2015, and in Psychology Today starting in 2011. In 2009, she was named one of GO magazine's 100 Women We Love. Sterling has also written for The Huffington Post, and her advice has been highlighted in Woman's Day, Experience Life magazine, Bustle, People, INSIDER, Well + Good, and more. She has been interviewed on podcasts including "Works for Us with Rachel Zoe and Rodger Berman", "Workin' On It with Meghan Trainor & Ryan Trainor", "Viall Files", and Us Weekly's Bachelor Podcast - "Here For The Right Reasons".

=== Television ===
Sterling made her national television debut in 2011, providing expert commentary on "When Women Kill", an E! Entertainment special profiling female criminals.

She is the host and relationship expert on the E! reality television series Famously Single, which premiered on June 14, 2016, and features a cast of eight celebrities living together for a month. Sterling leads the participants in group and individual exercises designed to help them work out personal issues at the root of their romantic problems.

== Personal life ==
In 2009, two months after a civil ceremony in Connecticut, Sterling married Stephanie Koncicki in Manhattan in a Jewish ceremony. Their married name, Sterling, was taken in honor of a family of Holocaust victims with no surviving members. They live in New York City.
