= Zelda Foster =

Social worker

Zelda Foster (August 8, 1934 - July 4, 2006 Park Slope, Brooklyn) was a social worker who was a leader in the hospice movement. Foster also taught at the Columbia School of Social Work and was director of children's mental health at the Children's Aid Society.

== Biography ==
=== Early life ===
She was born Zelda Phyllis Leader to Nathan and Ida Leader, owners of a candy store in Hell's Kitchen, Manhattan. She is a 1955 graduate of Brooklyn College and earned a master’s degree in 1957 from the Columbia University School of Social Work. Foster died in her home from cancer.

=== Career ===
She was a caseworker at Maimonides Medical Center when she graduated from Columbia and in 1959, went to work for the Brooklyn V.A. hospital.

==== Hospice Movement ====
In an article that appeared in the November 1965 issue of the Journal of the National Association of Social Workers, Foster wrote about the "conspiracy of silence" that dying hospital patients faced. She based the article on her professional experiences at the VA, saying that "for the first time, … the majority of patients were considered capable of understanding the nature of their diseases.'" She was a co-founder of the first Hospice Association in New York.

== Legacy ==
The Zelda Foster Studies Program in Palliative and End-of-Life Care at the New York University Silver School of Social Work is named after her.

In 2005, the Columbia University School of Social Work Hall of Fame inducted her as a Pioneer.
