= Laurel House =

Relationship expert and dating coach

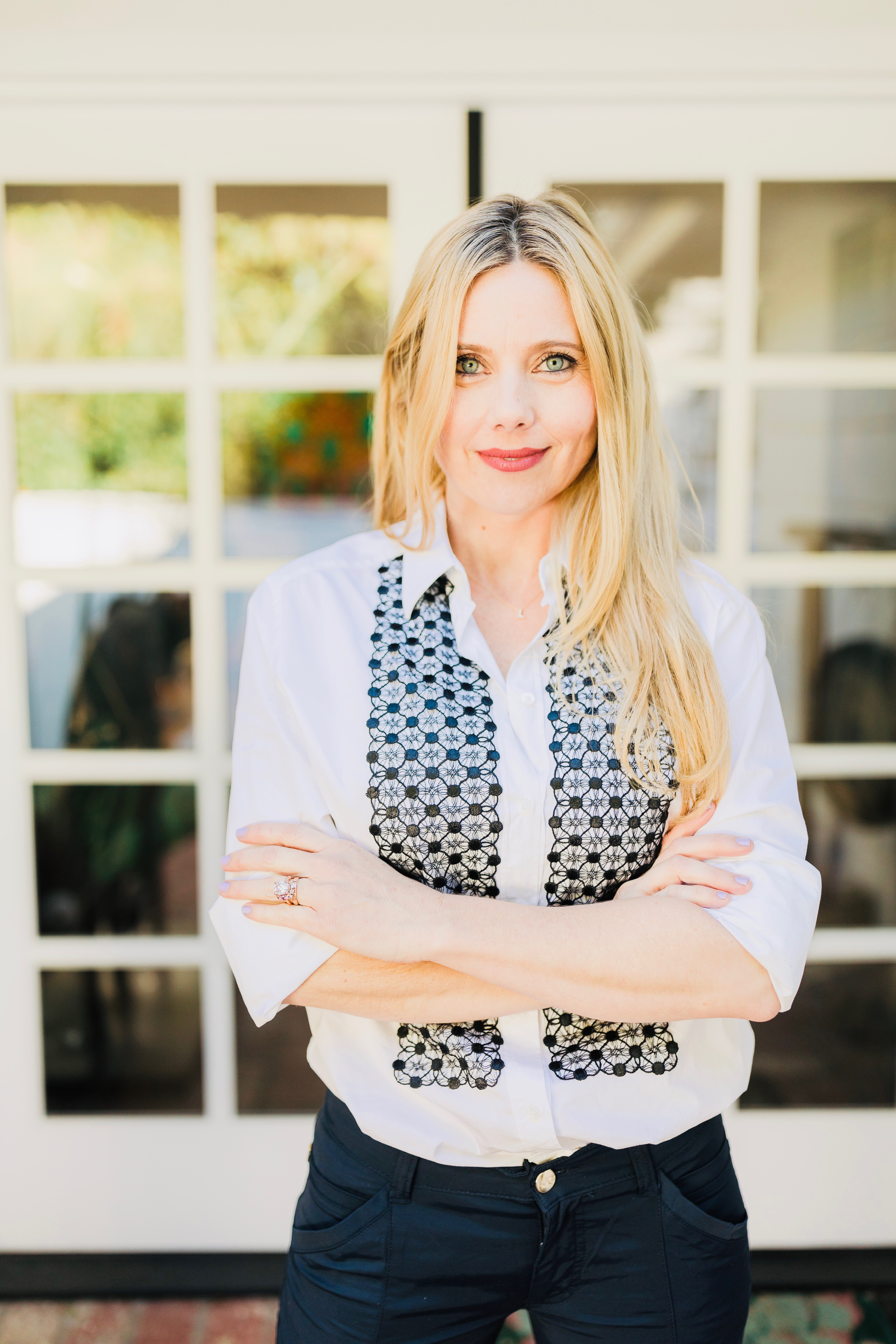
- Born: Los Angeles, California
- Known for: dating coaching, writing, hosting
- Movement: Dating coaching, writing, hosting
- Website: www.laurelhouse.com

Laurel House is an American author, TV personality and international dating coach with a no-games approach to dating. House is a monthly guest of KTLA hosting segments for their morning news program and appears as a dating expert on Nightline, The Today Show, E! News, and Good Morning America. In 2016, House was a dating coach on the E! Network original series Famously Single where she tried to help celebrities find romantic partners. In 2022, House coined the concept "PrioriDating," which encourages daters to prioritize themselves and their primary needs as they date.

== Writing ==
House is a contributing writer to media sources including: Reader's Digest, Thrillist, Self, AskMen.com, YourTango.com, Shape, The Minds Journal. and Glamour Magazine, where she writes on a variety of topics related to dating and relationships. House is an expert on flirting and has been called the ‘Man Whisperer’. Her dating concepts have been referenced in outlets including the Wall Street Journal.

House has also written five books including:

- QuickieChick's Cheat Sheet to Life, Love, Food, Fitness, Fashion and Finance—on a Less-Than-Fabulous Budget (St. Martin's Press, 2012) In this book, House compiles lifestyle tips, cheat-sheets and quizzes.
- QuickieChick Guide: Fit to Flirt, Get the Body You Want and the Guy You Deserve (St. Martin's Press, 2012)
- Screwing the Rules: The No-Games Guide to Love (Running Press, 2014) In this book, House writes about the games and strategies associated with dating, using her own experiences following the classic dating rules to show that ignoring them is a better approach.

== TV personality ==
House has been a guest host on various networks as a dating expert. She is a monthly guest of KTLA for their morning news program, including three large features filmed in 2016. Additionally, she is a recurring featured expert on Nightline and has appeared on The Today Show, E! News, and Good Morning America.

In 2015, House co-hosted a dating game show entitled Love Bites that aired on the FYI Network helping daters on blind dinner dates.

In 2016, she was a dating coach on the E! Network original series, Famously Single with a cast of celebrities including: Brandi Glanville, the Bachelorette's Josh Murray, Pauly D, Love & Hip Hop's Somaya Reece, Aubrey O'Day, Jessica White, Willis McGahee and Calum Best.

== Dating coach ==
Since 2010, House has worked with clients around the world with one-on-one dating consulting. House is a relationship expert at eHarmony and is known for giving practical dating and relationship advice.

House co-hosted The Great Love Debate podcast with Brian Howie, and co-hosted The Man Whisperer podcast with Robert Mack.

House coined the concept of "Prioridating," which refers to daters prioritizing their needs and themselves as they pursue love. Ryan Seacrest discussed this concept on his show, On Air with Ryan Seacrest, as a way to find long-term love.

== Personal life ==
Laurel House is married with four children.
