= Michael A. Lindsey =

American mental health researcher and academic

- Born: Michael Anthony Lindsey

Academic work
- Discipline: Social work, public health
- Sub-discipline: Child and adolescent mental health

Michael Anthony Lindsey is an American scholar, college administrator and researcher in social work and public health who specializes in child and adolescent mental health, and has conducted key research about Black teenage suicide in the United States and related behaviors in adolescents. He is dean of the New York University Silver School of Social Work, where he is also the Paulette Goddard Professor of Social Work. He was chair of the working group of experts who released the 2019 report for the Congressional Black Caucus Emergency Taskforce on Black Youth Suicide and Mental Health, titled “Ring the Alarm: The Crisis of Black Youth Suicide in America.” Lindsey is a member of the New York City Board of Health and president of the American Academy of Social Work and Social Welfare.

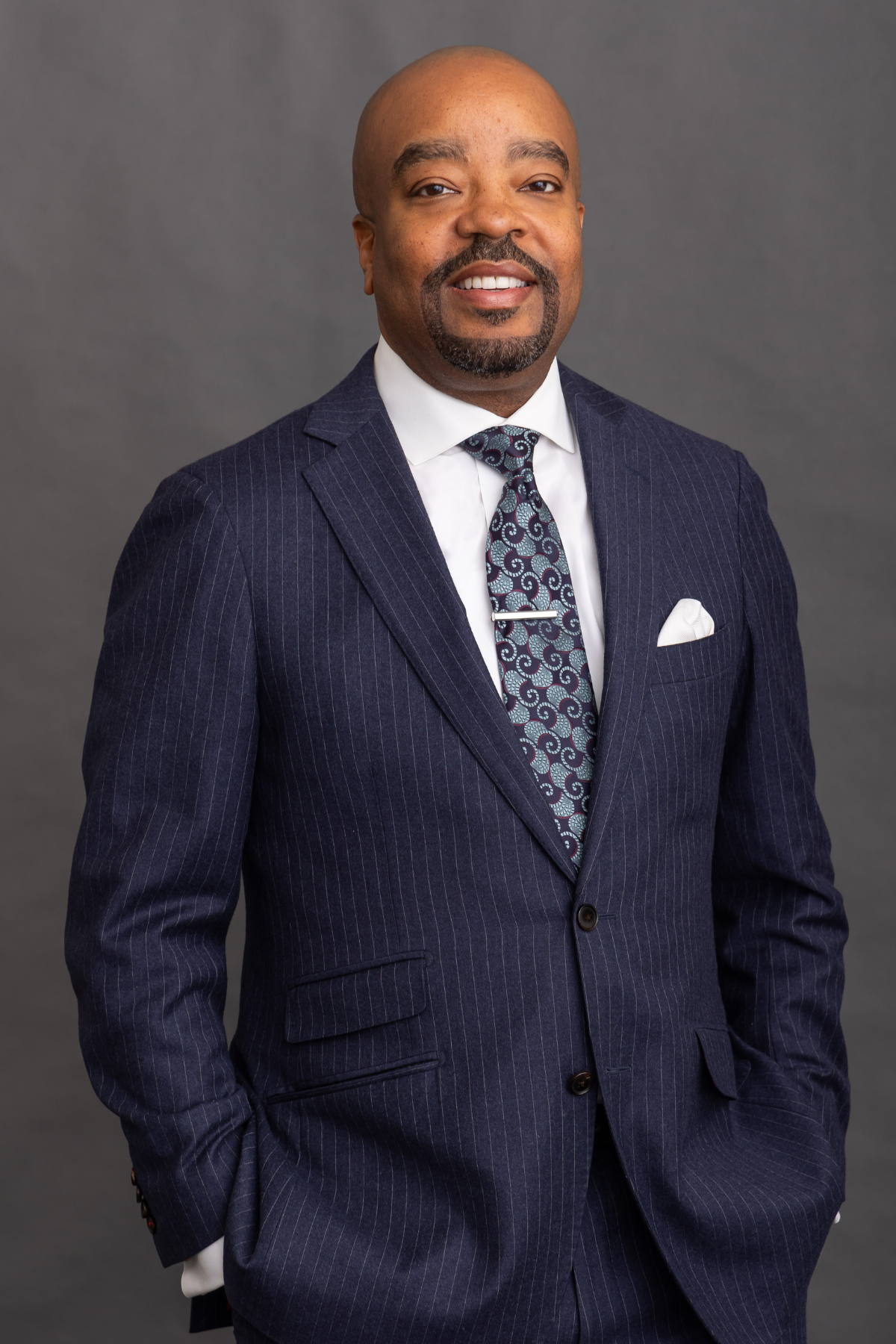
Portrait of Dr. Michael A. Lindsey

== Early life and education ==
Lindsey grew up in Southeast (Washington, D.C.) and has said what he witnessed there in the 1980s during the crack epidemic inspired him to pursue a career addressing the needs of marginalized people. “I’ve always been interested in mental health treatment disparities, particularly the lack of treatment access for serious mental health issues among Black people,” he told Trust for America’s Health in a 2020 interview. “My passion derives from growing up in the Southeast section of Washington, D.C., where I saw the effects of drug use and undiagnosed, untreated addiction and mental health issues. I want to bridge that gap to make sure kids and families are connected to treatment in meaningful ways.”

He received his bachelor of arts degree in sociology from Morehouse College in 1994. In 1996 he graduated from Howard University with a master’s degree in social work. Following his MSW graduation, The Washington Post highlighted his master’s lecture on research investigating the success factors of Black men raised in female-headed households. Lindsey, who was raised alongside five brothers by a single mother, credited his mother with instilling in him a strong drive to succeed.

Lindsey went on to the University of Pittsburgh, where he received a master’s degree in public health, focusing on health services administration in 2001 and a PhD in social work in 2002. He also completed a postdoctoral fellowship at Johns Hopkins University’s Bloomberg School of Public Health.

== Career ==
Lindsey became a licensed master social worker in Washington, DC in 1996, and held that certification until 2012. He was a psychotherapist there between 2002 and 2004. He joined the University of Maryland, Baltimore, MD (UMBC) School of Social Work in 2004 as an assistant professor, and during his time at the school he was promoted to associate professor. His research focused on the mental health of Black adolescents. He also served as a faculty affiliate at the University of Maryland, Baltimore, MD School of Medicine, within the Department of Psychiatry’s Center for School Mental Health.

In 2014, Lindsey joined the faculty of the NYU Silver School of Social Work as an associate professor. He was appointed as the director of the school’s McSilver Institute for Poverty Policy and Research, which focuses on investigating and addressing the root causes of poverty, in 2016. In 2018, Lindsey was selected by the Aspen Institute to be a Health Innovator Fellow. In 2022, he was appointed as dean of the Silver School, the first Black dean in the school’s history. Lindsey was appointed to the New York City Board of Health in 2023 and became the president of the American Academy for Social Work and Social Welfare in 2024.

Under Lindsey’s leadership, NYU Silver launched the School Social Work Training Academy in partnership with New York City Department of Education. He has also incorporated artificial intelligence training and applications in the school’s curriculum and research.

== Policy advocacy ==
Through his research and advocacy, Lindsey emphasizes the importance of providing culturally competent care that patients recognize as authentic. He notes that addressing treatment barriers in the Black community requires overcoming historical institutional distrust and destigmatizing therapy by making care accessible within trusted community spaces.

During a congressional staff briefing hosted by U.S. Representative Bonnie Watson Coleman (D, New Jersey) in December 2018, Lindsey called for the creation of a task force to address the growing prevalence of suicide in black children and adolescents. In April 2019, Rep. Watson Coleman announced the creation of the Congressional Black Caucus Task Force on Black Youth Suicide and Mental Health to identify causes and solutions, which empowered a working group of academic and practicing experts who were led by Lindsey and the McSilver Institute to produce a report.

In December 2019, the task force released the report, and simultaneously introduced legislation aimed at addressing racial disparities in youth mental health care. Titled, “Ring the Alarm: The Crisis of Black Youth Suicide in America,” the report described an “alarming” increase in the suicide rates for Black children and teenagers within the previous generation. The trend was notable to Lindsey and the other researchers given historical data showing lower rates of suicide among Black Americans. The report called for more federal funding of research relating to black youth mental health and suicide, as well as support for evidence-based interventions and best practices for clinicians, school personnel, teachers, parents and others who interact with Black youth. The companion legislation, the Pursuing Equity in Mental Health Act (H.R. 1475), authorized $805 million in grants and other funding. It passed in the U.S. House of Representatives in 2021.

Meanwhile, the New York State Department of Mental Health wrote in January 2020 that it had begun working with Lindsey and staff at the McSilver Institute to develop strategies related to black youth suicide prevention, using the “Ring the Alarm” report as a “starting point.”

The “Ring the Alarm” report, and Lindsey’s role in it, was cited by FCC Commissioner Geoffrey Starks in a July 2020 memo relating to the implementation of the National Suicide Hotline Improvement Act of 2018. National Institute of Mental Health Director Joshua Gordon also cited the report in a September 2020 message which described the institute’s intention to expand funding for research relating to black youth suicide, including through a Notice of Special Interest (NOSI) in Research on Risk and Prevention of Black Youth Suicide released in June of that year.

== Research ==
Lindsey’s research focuses on child and adolescent mental health, including suicide, depression, and risk behaviors; the mental health of black adolescents, men and boys; as well as school-based mental health services. He is also engaged in research relating to the 988 Suicide & Crisis Lifeline service, with NYU School of Global Public Health researcher Jonathan Purtle. He has been the recipient of 3 R01 research project grants from the National Institutes of Health.

The most widely cited research for which he was the lead author, according to Google Scholar, includes a 2019 study that was published in the journal of the American Academy of Pediatrics, which noted an increase in self-reported suicide attempts among Black high school students between 1991 and 2017, during a period when such attempts were decreasing or flat among students in other ethnic groups. It was the first to document rising suicide attempt rates among Black adolescents, according to the New York Times.

The second-most widely cited study that he led, published in the Journal of Black Psychology, found that social support － especially family support － has an important role to play for lowering depressive symptoms in black adolescent boys, particularly when they face stigma against mental illness and the use of mental health services.

Lindsey serves on the editorial boards of the scholarly journals Administration and Policy in Mental Health and Mental Health Services Research, Journal of Clinical Child and Adolescent Psychology, Psychiatric Services, and School Mental Health.

== Recognition ==
Lindsey was the recipient of the 2023 Howard University School of Social Work Inabel Burns Lindsay Education Scholarship Award. He was the inaugural recipient of the University of Pittsburgh’s Center on Race and Social Problems Larry E. Davis Award for Excellence in Race Research in 2020. The politics and policy news publication City & State New York recognized him in the 2024 Health Care Power 100 list, as well as the 2022 and 2023 Higher Education Power 100 lists, and the 2021 Mental Health Power 50 list. In 2025 and 2026, City & State New York included Lindsey on both the Trailblazers in Higher Education and Trailblazers in Health Care lists.
