= Journal of Addictive Diseases =

- Discipline: Addiction medicine
- Language: English
- Edited by: R. Gregory Lande, DO

Publication details
- Former name(s): Advances in Alcohol & Substance Abuse
- History: 1982–present
- Publisher: Taylor & Francis
- Frequency: Quarterly
- Impact factor: 1.762 (2017)

Standard abbreviations
- ISO 4: J. Addict. Dis.

Indexing
- CODEN: JADDER
- ISSN: 1055-0887 (print); 1545-0848 (web)
- LCCN: 91641354
- OCLC no.: 23070745

Links
- Journal homepage; Online access; Online archive

The Journal of Addictive Diseases is a quarterly peer-reviewed medical journal covering addiction medicine. It was established in 1982 as the Advances in Alcohol & Substance Abuse, obtaining its current name in 1991. It is published by Taylor & Francis on behalf of the American Osteopathic Academy of Addiction Medicine, of which it is the official journal. The editor-in-chief is R. Gregory Lande, DO According to the Journal Citation Reports, the journal has a 2021 impact factor of 2.065.
