= Famously Single =

American reality television series

- Genre: Reality television
- Country of origin: United States
- Original language: English
- No. of seasons: 2
- No. of episodes: 16

Production
- Executive producers: John Irwin; Damian Sullivan; Alex Weresow
- Running time: 42 minutes
- Production company: Irwin Entertainment

Original release
- Network: E!
- Release: June 14, 2016 – August 13, 2017

Famously Single is an American reality television series that premiered on June 14, 2016, on the E! network. The series follows eight single celebrities who all move in together and try to solve their romantic problems.

== Production ==
The show premiered on June 14, 2016.

The show was renewed for a second season that premiered on June 25, 2017.

== Cast ==
=== Season 1 ===
- Brandi Glanville – television personality, known for appearing on The Real Housewives of Beverly Hills.
- Pauly D – television personality and disc jockey, known for starring in MTV's reality show Jersey Shore.
- Aubrey O'Day – singer-songwriter and television personality.
- Josh Murray – television personality, winner of the tenth season of reality competition series The Bachelorette.
- Jessica White – model.
- Willis McGahee – former American football running back.
- Somaya Reece – Latin music artist, appeared on VH1's Love & Hip Hop: New York.
- Calum Best – television personality and model.
- Dr. Darcy Sterling - Relationship Expert, Psychotherapist
- Laurel House - Dating & Empowerment Coach and "Screwing the Rules" Author
- Robert Mack - Positive Psychology Expert and "Love from the Inside Out" Author

=== Season 2 ===
- Tiffany Pollard – reality television personality on Flavor of Love.
- Dorothy Wang – reality television personality known from Rich Kids of Beverly Hills.
- Malika Haqq – reality television personality known for appearing on Hollywood Divas, Dash Dolls, Keeping Up with the Kardashians and its spin-offs.
- Karina Smirnoff – professional dancer from Dancing with the Stars.
- Ronnie Ortiz-Magro – reality television star on Jersey Shore.
- Chad Johnson – reality television personality on The Bachelorette.
- David McIntosh – fitness model.
- Calum Best – British socialite.
- Dr. Darcy Sterling - Relationship Expert, Psychotherapist
- Robert Mack - Positive Psychology Expert and "Love from the Inside Out" Author

== Episodes ==
Season	Episodes	Originally released	
Season	Episodes	First released	Last released
1	8	June 14, 2016	August 2, 2016
2	8	June 25, 2017	August 13, 2017

=== Season 1 (2016) ===
No. overall	No. in season	Title	Original release date	U.S. viewers (millions)
1	1	What are THOSE?	June 14, 2016	0.571
2	2	Who Do You Think You Are?	June 21, 2016	0.482
3	3	Will They or Won't They?	June 28, 2016	0.612
4	4	Do You Trust Me?	July 5, 2016	0.546
5	5	Who Do You Love?	July 12, 2016	0.516
6	6	You're Falling In Love With Me?	July 19, 2016	0.592
7	7	Wanna Be Saved?	July 26, 2016	0.460
8	8	Where Do We Go From Here?	August 2, 2016	0.432

=== Season 2 (2017) ===
No. overall	No. in season	Title	Original release date	U.S. viewers (millions)
9	1	Date Marry Dump	June 25, 2017	0.469
10	2	Let's Do Some Damage	July 2, 2017	0.368
11	3	The Disappearance of Calum Best	July 9, 2017	0.355
12	4	So You're Saying There's a Chance	July 16, 2017	0.371
13	5	Fight Night	July 23, 2017	0.349
14	6	Up in Flames	July 30, 2017	0.370
15	7	Meet the Twins	August 6, 2017	0.530
16	8	Roses and Ring Boxes	August 13, 2017	0.449

== Broadcast ==
The series debuted in the United States on June 14, 2016. Internationally, the series premiered in Australia on the local version of E! on June 16, 2016.
