= Grand Challenges for Social Work =

Social work initiative

- Formation: 2012
- Headquarters: University of Maryland, School of Social Work
- Website: www.grandchallengesforsocialwork.org

The Grand Challenges for Social Work is an initiative originally spearheaded by the American Academy of Social Work and Social Welfare. The challenges are modeled after a similar undertaking led by the National Academy of Engineering. Edwina Uehara from the University of Washington, School of Social Work, proposed the Grand Challenges approach to the American Academy of Social Work and Social Welfare (AASWSW). Then President of the American Academy of Social Work and Social Welfare (Richard Barth of the University of Maryland School of Social Work) presented the idea to the AASWSW Board, which approved it.

In 2013, the Grand Challenges for Social Work leadership invited national social work organizations, interest groups, and academic institutions to conceptualize and outline the Grand Challenges initiative. More than 80 suggestions for Grand Challenge topics were submitted online and in-person. From the ideas, the committee issued a call for concept papers and approximately 40 papers were submitted. As part of this work, the group commissioned several background papers and an Impact Model to define the issues, describe the accomplishments of social work to date, and explain the Grand Challenges concept.

Challenges were identified in partnership with sister organizations, including the National Association of Social Workers, Council on Social Work Education, Society for Social Work and Research, Group for the Advancement of Doctoral Education in Social Work, National Association of Deans and Directors in Social Work, and the St. Louis Group. The Grand Challenges were announced in January 2016 at the Society for Social Work and Research annual conference in Washington, DC. An impact report was published in 2021 to mark the end of the fifth year of the Grand Challenges.

== Grand Challenges ==
The 13 Grand Challenges for Social Work are:

- Ensure healthy development for all youth: Addressing behavioral health issues in youth is part of this Grand Challenge. Drew Reynolds, a PhD candidate at the Boston College School of Social Work, ties into it with his work on social network analysis and its potential to tackle social problems.
- Eliminate racism
- Close the health gap: In December 2016, the International Journal of Social Work published the paper “Social Work Grand Challenges and the U.N. Sustainable Development Goals: Linking Social Work and Women’s Health.” The authors make the case for “a call to action for more scholarly work on women’s health in the context of current national and global conversations about this social justice issue.”
- Stop family violence. This grand challenge includes a concerted effort to better integrate the scholarship and practice that links child maltreatment prevention and services with those addressing intimate partner violence. These sub-fields have developed with different methodological and conceptual approaches. The US CDC has recently been promoting the idea of "connecting the dots" which shows that there is quite a bit of continuity between child maltreatment, youth violence, and intimate partner violence, and gender based violence. A recent chapter on this grand challenge by Barth and Macy begins to draw out some of these continuities.
- Advance long and productive lives
- Eradicate social isolation: Social isolation is a growing issue, affecting people of all walks of life and ability. It can affect children and youth, people with disabilities, older people, and people without access to technology. Social workers are on the front lines, addressing these issues in a variety of settings and with a range of interventions, as noted in a piece in the June 2016 issue of NASW News.
- End homelessness
- Create social responses to a changing environment
- Harness technology for social good: Kristin Battista-Frazee, MSW, explores the ways that technology is used in social work—from educating students and communicating via social media to online counseling and electronic records. Jonathan Singer, PhD, LCSW, of Loyola University School of Social Work, wrote a blog post on a paper he co-authored calling for practice innovation through technology in the field of social work.
- Promote smart decarceration: Researchers have called for utilizing the Grand Challenges for Social Work framework, with its emphasis on using evidence-based policies to address social injustices, to reform the current approach to managing sexual offender registries.
- Reduce extreme economic inequality
- Build financial capability for all
- Achieve equal opportunity and justice

== Activities ==
There have been Grand Challenge-themed meetings and conferences, colloquia, as well as several special issue journals. Curriculum development and recruitment of students is also a significant goal. In 2016, USC School of Social Work announced a DSW program themed around the Grand Challenges. Additionally, each Grand Challenge has developed a set of policy recommendations. The University of Maryland School of Social Work published an article detailing the history and progress of the Grand Challenges initiative in the Winter 2017 issue of Connections Magazine.

In 2017, the Journal of the Society for Social Work and Research published a special section on implementing the Grand Challenges. There are also a series of books on the 12 challenge topics.

== University efforts ==
The University of California Berkeley Social Welfare has held sessions on health and mental health, the effect of new technology on social service delivery and outcomes, women and poverty, and issues around aging services and policy.

On November 11, 2016, the University of Iowa, with the support of the National Association of Social Workers, held a day-long conference on the Grand Challenges. The aim of the conference was to bolster the leadership capacity of social work professionals and social justice advocates by detailing the issues and current efforts to address them, as well as initiating conversations around promising new approaches.

In September 2016, the Brown School of Social Work at Washington University in St. Louis hosted a Grand Challenges Policy Conference in partnership with the AASWSW to specify steps toward positive policy action. Each of the 12 grand challenge networks have developed a set of policy recommendations. These recommendations are now being used to generate and inform policy and civic engagement at local, state, regional, and national levels.

The University of Illinois Urbana-Champaign has published a paper that “describes the relevance of the GCSWI to professional education and suggests the collective-impact model as a heuristic for professional preparation to collaborate in grand challenge contexts.”

The administrative offices of the Grand Challenges are at the University of Maryland School of Social Work which has also provided leadership to the grand challenges to End Homelessness, Stop Family Violence, and Build Financial Capability for All. The Grand Challenges Executive Committee has four sub-committees: Education, Governance, Policy and Programs, and Development.

In 2022 The New York Community Trust funded a doctoral fellowship program which received nearly 100 applications from PHD and DSW students. The Grand Challenges for Social Work Fellowship program now funds 13 Fellows (one for each Grand Challenge) and 12 Honorable mention scholars whose work was selected for its ability to build on the work of Grand Challenge Networks and to advance the profession and strengthen society.

Social workers in the United Kingdom are considering a similar effort as a way forward for the field of social work there.
