= Parents with disabilities =

Parent and child

Parents with disabilities are people with certain disorders (mental, physical, or other types) who are raising young children or being cared for by their young children.

Disability brings various problems to the parents themselves, their children and the whole family. Researchers have studied the effects and issues raised by disabled parents. Aiming to help parents with disabilities, organizations and governments have delivered relevant strategies to provide support.

The term 'disability' refers to the existence of one or more long-term restrictions in any core activities including self-care, mobility, communication, or employment.

== Classification of disabilities and issues ==
Disability includes a range of distinctive disorders varying in type of condition and severity. The difficulties associated with them vary depending on families' life stage and types of impairment.

Physical disability is the relatively more commonly occurring one. Among children living with a disabled parent in Australia, 91% of them have a physically disabled parent while 11% have a parent with mental or behavioral disabilities.

=== Physically disabled parents ===
"Physical condition[s] include cancers, endocrine diseases, diseases of the nervous system, eye, ear, circulatory system, respiratory system, digestive system and musculoskeletal system, congenital disorders, injuries and other physical conditions. " Much research of physically disabled parents has historically been based on negative hypotheses and recommended conclusions. Parents with physical or sensory disabilities experience misunderstanding of their parenting abilities.

==== Deaf parents ====
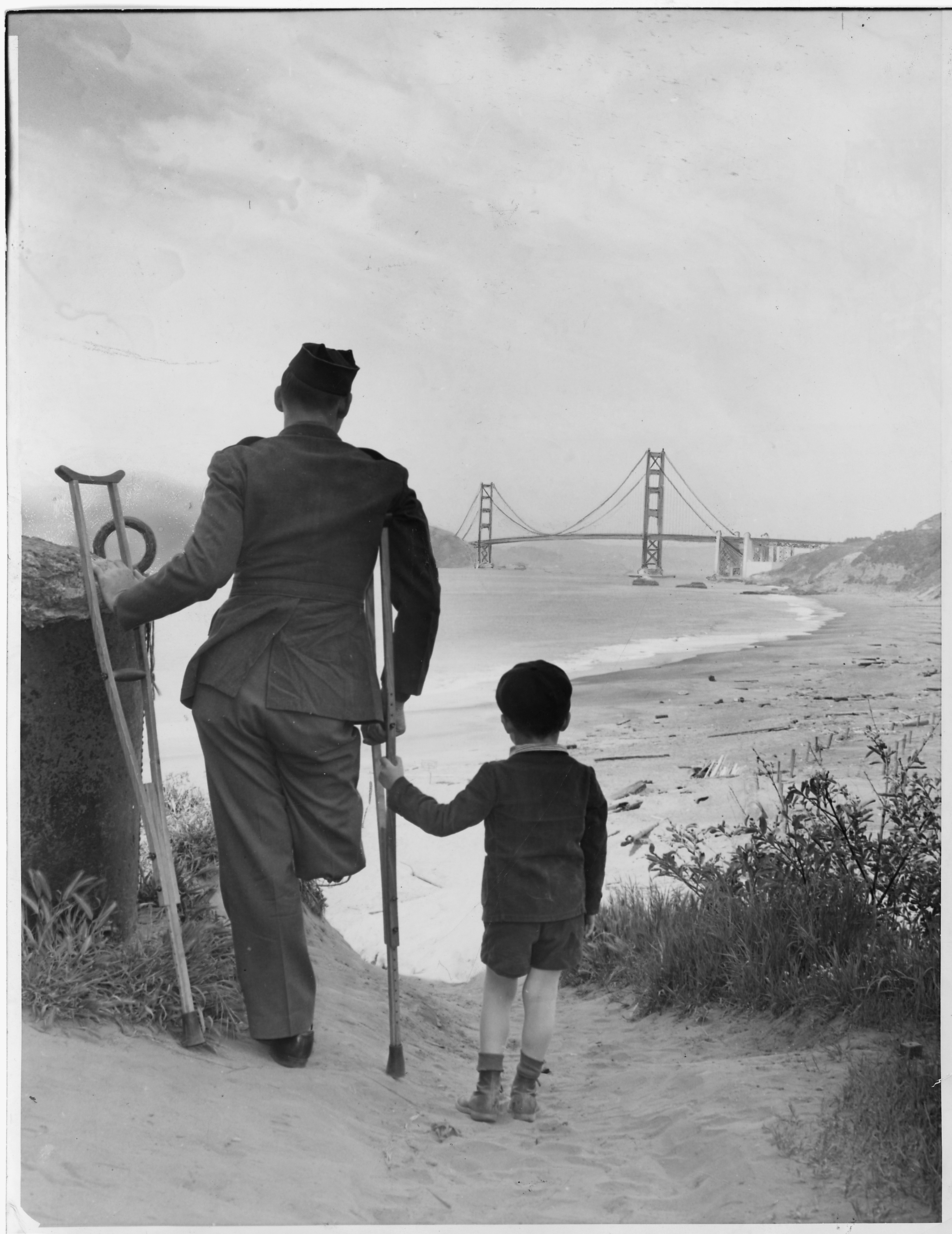
Disabled veteran with a child

Deaf parents face communication barriers which may limit their participation in some social networks.

==== Visually impaired parents ====
Visually impaired parents face difficulties in ensuring a safe environment for both their children and themselves, as well as the restriction in accessible activities for them to take part in with their children.

==== Mobility difficulties ====
Mobility difficulties make parents rely on others or certain equipment like a wheelchair to support them. More energy and time is often required for them to move from one place to another.

==== Chronic pain ====
Chronic pain causes stress and could make parents become less patient with their children in daily life. More rest is needed, which limits the time allocated for parenting. The side effects caused by pain relief and other necessary medicines including possible addiction is another challenge faced by parents with chronic pain.

=== Mentally disabled parents ===
Mental or behavioral disorder includes psychoses, neuroses, intellectual and developmental disorders, and other mental or behavioral disorders.

==== Intellectual disabilities ====
Parents with intellectual disabilities face discrimination in their parenting role. They have difficulties managing housing and financial issues because of their socio-economic disadvantage, which may lead to debt. As their children grow up and their intellectual ability surpasses their parents', new challenges arise like providing children with assistance in education. A 2018 systematic review found low quality evidence that some parents, mainly mothers with intellectual disabilities, provided effective parenting when provided training and support for the required skills.

==== Learning difficulties ====
Parents with learning difficulties need help to process information and manage tasks. The way in which they gain and understand information is different from parents without these disabilities. Because of this, many face social criticism and stigma.

== Young carer ==
The term 'young carer' means children who participate in taking care of their parents in life.

=== Types of caring activities provided by children ===
- Direct care for parents, including assist in parents' mobility and other personal cares like toileting, eating, communicating, showering and dressing. Among these assist in mobility is the most common direct assistance provided by young carers.
- General household tasks, for example laundry, cooking, gardening and simple repairing works. Children participating in this form of assist occupy a greater portion than those helping with direct personal care.
- Financial management like helping with money and bills, even work to earn for living expense.

=== Age and identification ===
Comparing to children in young age, more children in high school age are taking the responsibility of caring for their disabled parents, which reflects that whether higher-aged children are more possible to have disabled parents or children of higher age are more often asked to provide their parents with assistance thanks to their higher-levelled capacity.

According to the data resulted from the research, the local disabled parents in Leicester and Leicestershire of UK are less likely to identify children aged between 12 and 19 as young carers. This fact illustrates that rather than what children virtually do parents rely more on broader social relations within the family when they consider whether their children should be defined as 'young carers'. Whereas doctors depend on how much burden a child take in caring to identify young carers.

School teachers play crucial role in identifying young carers in early age and offering help. The young carers identified by teachers are in averagely younger age than those identified by doctors, which makes it important for primary teaching institutions especially to identify young carers.

=== Why children become young carers ===
Participants from a Young Carers workshop held in Wellington, New Zealand in 2005 indicated that New Zealand children and young people become young carers mainly because of cultural expectations, nature of disability, awareness and acceptance of services, and other reasons relating to the family unit like no one else is taking the responsibility.

=== Impacts on young carers ===
==== Negative ====
When young carers are not supported, negative outcomes will apply. These consequences involving both young carers' social and personal life.

- Children's academic achievement is negatively impacted due to the time they spend on doing caring activities for disabled parents. Young carers' academic outcomes are below their peers and boys are effected more severely than girls.
- Further study impacted. The number of young carers who want to continue studying in university is fewer than normal students, whether because of financial difficulties or need of time for caring.
- Young carers are afraid of being seen differently. They feel anxious and worried.

==== Positive ====
- More mature than peers, greater sense of responsibility. They feel proud and happy to be able to care for families.
- Children acquire greater compassion while also gaining knowledge and skills.
- Creates close family relationships.
- Shapes a mind that accepts differences and fosters positive attitudes towards disabilities.

=== Support towards young carers ===
Large number of young carers have to sacrifice their future to take care of their family. Institutions that have close connection with young carers including schools and social service departments need to search for young carers and provide proper support. For example, transport services should be offered to children whose parents are unable to take them to school. School should train teachers to be aware of young carers and build special mechanism to assist young carers. Connection with other local young carer service institution also needs to be established. Other useful support include emotional support, opportunity of meeting others in similar situation, counseling and so on.

== Effects on children ==
=== About negative effects ===
The lack of relative research in this area leads to the prejudice that disabled parents negatively affect their children, which is inaccurate. As high-quality studies state, the sources of problems happening in parenting with disability is the same as that in non-disabled parenting, which include parents' former experience of being abused physically, sexual, or on substance, poverty, lack of appropriate support and so on. The disability in parenting alone, is not the cause of negative impact to children.

It is widely considered that children's participation in education will be negatively influenced by their parents' disability. 1998 Survey of Disability, Aging and Carers provided broad data showing this kind of impact is relatively low by comparing the number of children participating school from families with and without disabled parents. However the data does show that the existence of disabled parents will negatively influence further education.

=== About positive effects ===
Little difference is found between the household tasks done by children with or without disabled parents. And life details of children with disabled parents like the number of friend and activities they do with parents are almost same with those of children with non-disabled parents.

Children who have parents with disabilities even have an "average to better-than-average" development. Children from the family with disabled parents are more skilled at solving problem, more compassionate, more respectful towards disabilities and differences, more sensitive about justice and more independent. Parents with intellectual disability always have a strong and warm family bonds with their children, even when some children were removed by welfare system. And most children of disabled parents regard their childhood as happy memory.

Researchers at Israel's Bar Ilan University has delivered a study and the result shows that children who have parents with sensory impairment are more empathic and shows higher awareness of emotions of others than other children from normal families. Other advantages of children with disabled parents like greater maturity, higher sensitivity and more abundant life experience were also reported by earlier research.

== The needed support ==
=== How supports need to be ===
- Specialized support. Except for the universal needs of income, housing, access to leisure activities and other informal supports which are demanded by both disabled and non-disabled parents, parents with disabilities requires more specialized supports regarding to different conditions of their impairment.
- In-time support. Instead of being provided when children have been in an urgent need of help, the support towards families with disabled parents is ideally supposed to be available throughout the whole parenting process from preparation of parenthood.
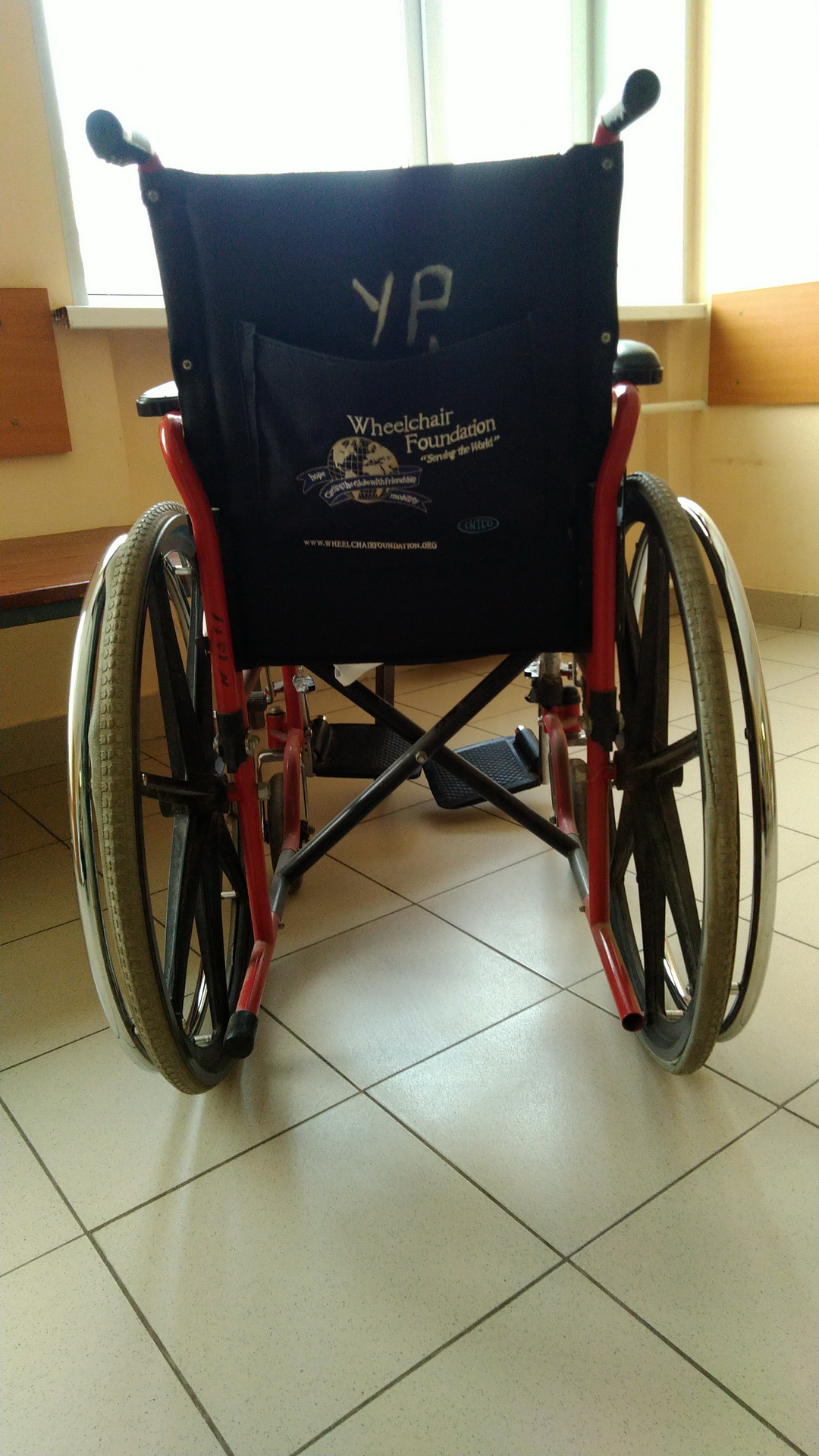
  Wheelchair
- Flexible support. Depending on different stages of children's maturity and alterations in parents' health condition, the support needed varies. And the family as a whole and other non-disabled members of the family should also be taken into account when the assistant is offered.
- Respect privacy. Not all parents with disabilities want their children or other family members to participate in the discussion about their disability when support is offered.

=== Types of needed support ===
==== Peer support ====
which is the assistance from people in similar situation. It's of great importance since it provides parents with disability the opportunity of sharing and communicating with others who are experiencing similar life. Owing to the scarce information about parenting with disability, the peer support network plays an even more significant role.

==== Support in education system ====
The facilities and environment of school should be accessible to all including disabled and normal parents, students and staffs. Inaccessible school facilities lead to lack of participation in children's school life for physically disabled parents. For parents with sensory impairment, appropriate way of communication with school is essential.

==== Need of special equipment ====
Parents with physical disabilities mention difficulties in taking care of children without proper equipment and with restriction in mobility. Deaf parents need equipment to be alerted when children are in need of help.

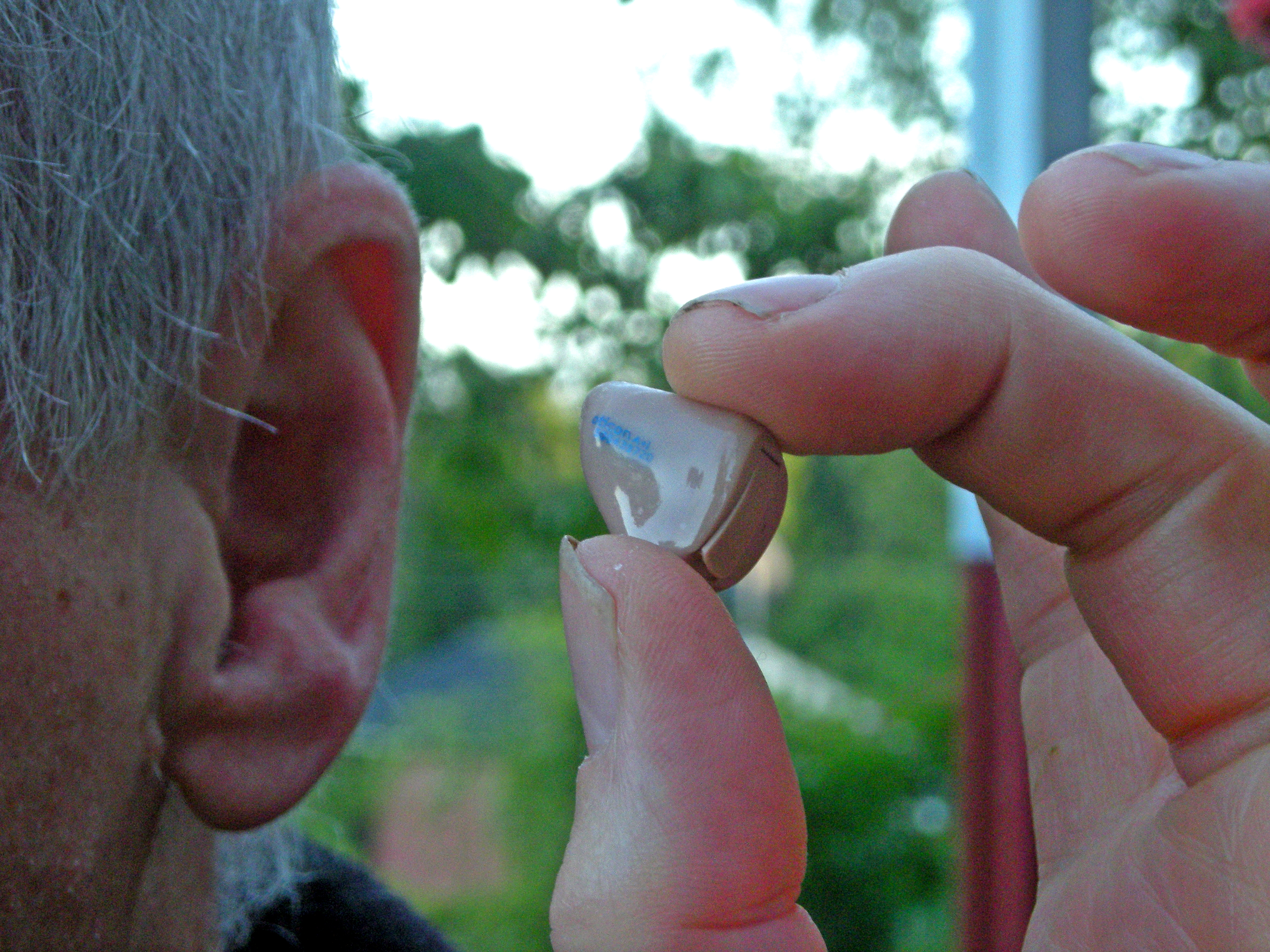
Hearing Aid

==== Financial support ====
Comparing to non-disabled parents, more disabled parents are not employed. Families with disabled parents also face extra expanse during daily life and parenting tasks due to their disability. They are more likely to experience the pressure of poverty and depend on public benefit. There are this kind of family not qualified for financial support because of their medium income level, which prevent them from affording special equipment and services. The public benefit should be accessible towards disabled parents.

==== Physical and mental health care ====
Parents with disabilities face barrier when attempt to get access to health care, especially women. Professionals in health care hold negative attitudes towards disabled parents, and underestimate life quality of disabled people. Depression is another significant issue faced by disabled parents. Women with disabilities have six times more chance than normal women to have depression. Appropriate service and support is necessary for disabled mothers under the effect of depression.

==== Support in personal daily life ====
A large number of disabled parents reported the need of assistance with activities of daily living such as cooking, and cleaning. Assistance in parenting tasks including taking recreational activities with children, carrying and holding children are also reported as needed by parents with disabilities.

==== Government support ====
The Americans with Disabilities Act is a law that protects the rights of people with disabilities. It ensures that parents with disabilities are given equal opportunities and are provided additional aid based on their individual needs.

== See also ==
- Disability
