= Saint Louis University School of Social Work =

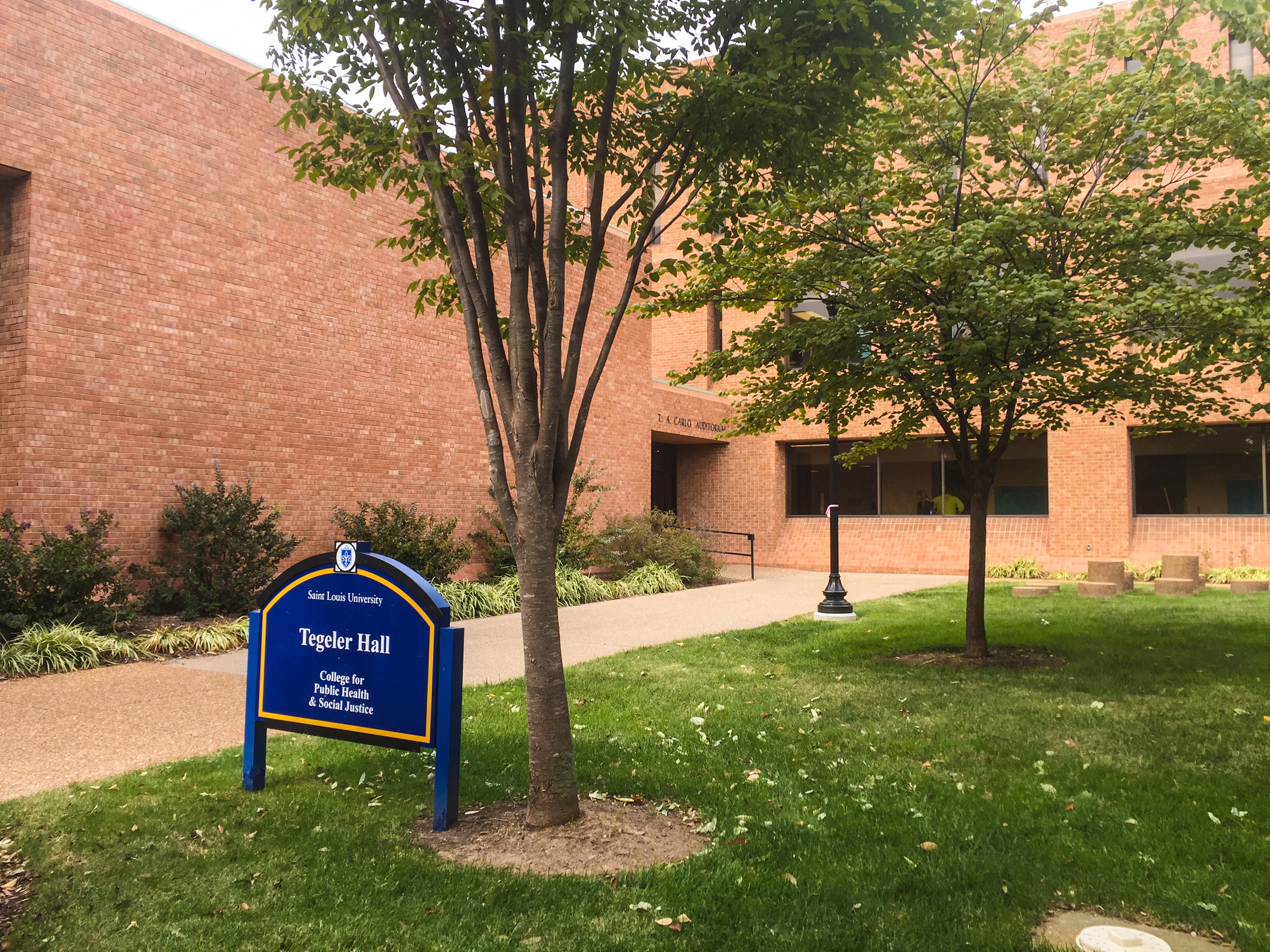
- Saint Louis University School of Social Work, located in Tegeler Hall. Photo taken in 2017.
- Type: Private
- Established: 1930
- Parent institution: Saint Louis University
- Religious affiliation: Jesuit
- Director: Donald Linhorst
- Students: 1,098
- Location: St. Louis, Missouri, U.S. 38°38′12″N 90°13′54″W
- Campus: Urban
- Website: SocialWork

The Saint Louis University School of Social Work is the graduate school for social work of Saint Louis University. Established in 1930 and continually accredited since 1933, the school offers students and faculty an opportunity to follow the Jesuit tradition of being "women and men for others."

== Rankings and accreditation ==
SLU's School of Social Work is fully accredited by the Council on Social Work Education (CSWE) – a recognition it has held since 1952.

In 2024, U.S. News & World Report ranked the school 43rd out of 319 in the nation.

== Degrees and programs ==
SLU's School of Social Work offers two undergraduate degrees, three master's, six dual-degree master's, one PhD, and two certificates.

== Location and facilities ==
Saint Louis University's School of Social Work is located in Tegeler Hall, on the main Frost Campus in midtown St. Louis, Missouri.

== See also ==
List of social work schools
