= Economic Emancipation Forum =

Political party in South Africa

- BJ Langa
- Ideology: Christian democracy Pensioners' interests
- National Assembly seats: 0 / 400
- Provincial Legislatures: 0 / 430

Website
- ecoforum.org.za

The Economic Emancipation Forum (EEF) is a South African political party based on Christian religious principles.

The party wants to lead a national “moral regeneration”, has lobbied for the financial rights of pensioners in the former Bophuthatswana homeland, is supportive of Israel, calls for the nationalisation of banks, and aims to increase support for black entrepreneurs.

The party contested the 2019 general election, and stated that it aimed to win 25% of the available national seats.

It won 0.04% of the vote, failing to win any seats.

== Election results ==
=== National elections ===
Election	Total votes	Share of vote	Seats	+/–	Government
2019	6,319	0.04%	0 / 400	–	extraparliamentary

=== Provincial elections ===
Election	Eastern Cape		Free State		Gauteng		Kwazulu-Natal		Limpopo		Mpumalanga		North-West		Northern Cape		Western Cape	
Election	%	Seats	%	Seats	%	Seats	%	Seats	%	Seats	%	Seats	%	Seats	%	Seats	%	Seats
2019	-	-	-	-	0.04%	0/73	-	-	-	-	-	-	-	-	-	-	-	-
