= American Academy of Social Work and Social Welfare =

American honor society

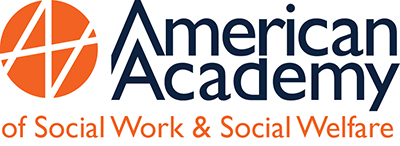
- Abbreviation: AASWSW
- Formation: November 6, 2009; 16 years ago
- Type: Nonprofit organization
- Legal status: Honor society
- Purpose: Research
- Members: 216 (2014)
- President: Michael A. Lindsey
- Past president: Mary McKay
- Previous President: Sarah Gehlert
- Parent organization: University of South Carolina, College of Social Work
- Staff: Sarah Butts, Executive Director, Grand Challenges for Social Work
- Website: aaswsw.org

The American Academy of Social Work and Social Welfare (abbreviated AASWSW) is an honor society of American scholars and practitioners in the field of social work and social welfare. The academy was established in 2009 and is incorporated as a 501 (c)(3) nonprofit organization in Ohio. Its first major initiative is the Grand Challenges for Social Work Initiative, the purpose of which is, according to Barth et al. (2014), to "help transform social work science, education, and practice around visionary and achievable challenges."

== Fellows ==
- Mimi Abramovitz, DSW (inducted in 2015)
- Laura Abrams, PhD (inducted in 2020)
- Amy Ai, PhD (inducted in 2021)
- Anita Barbee, PhD (inducted 2016)
- Kimberly Bender, PhD (inducted in 2020)
- David L. Albright, PhD, (inducted in 2021)
- Llewellyn J. Cornelius, PhD (inducted in 2024)
- Catherine Cubbin, PhD, (inducted in 2021)
- Renee Cunningham-Williams], PhD (inducted in 2021)
- Shaun M. Eack, PhD, (inducted in 2016)
- Tonya Edmond, PhD, (inducted in 2023)
- Elizabeth M.Z. Farmer (inducted in 2021)
- Cynthia Franklin, PhD (inducted in 2016)
- Colleen Galambos, PhD (inducted in 2021)
- Neil Guterman, PhD, (inducted 2019)
- James Jaccard, PhD (inducted in 2016)
- Sean Jose, PhD (inducted in 2017)
- Barbara L. Jones, PhD (inducted in 2021)
- Charles E. Lewis, Jr., PhD (inducted in 2021)
- Elizabeth Lightfoot, PhD (inducted in 2020).
- Michael A. Lindsey, PhD, MSW, MPH (inducted in 2021)
- Kurt Organista, PhD (inducted in 2021)
- Deborah K. Padgett, PhD (inducted in 2011)
- Michael Spencer, PhD (inducted in 2015)
- Kristen Slack, PhD (inducted in 2021)
- Susan Stone, PhD (inducted 2020)
- Dexter Voisin, PhD (inducted in 2021)
- Michael G. Vaughn, PhD (inducted in 2016)
- Jerome Wakefield, PhD (inducted in 2020)
- Karina Walters, PhD (inducted 2014)
- James Herbert Williams, PhD (inducted in 2016)
- Gautam Yadama, PhD (inducted in 2022)
