= Jakes Maseka =

South African politician and lawyer (1943–2016)

Member of the National Assembly
- In office 20 February 2001 – April 2004

Personal details
- Born: Jacobus Tapedi Maseka; 11 June 1943
- Died: 13 July 2016 (aged 73) Ga-Rankuwa, Gauteng; South Africa
- Citizenship: South Africa
- Party: Movement Democratic Party
- Other political affiliations: United Democratic Movement

Jacobus Tapedi "Jakes" Maseka (11 June 1943 – 13 July 2016) was a South African politician, lawyer, and businessman. He represented the United Democratic Movement (UDM) in the National Assembly from 2001 to 2004 but later broke away to found the Movement Democratic Party (MDP).

== Early life and career ==
Born on 11 June 1943, Maseka was a prominent attorney in the former bantustan of Bophuthatswana and chaired the bantustan's law society during apartheid. He was a member of the African National Congress before he joined the UDM.

== Political career ==
In the 1999 general election, Maseka stood as a UDM candidate for election to the National Assembly. Though he was not initially elected, he was sworn in on 20 February 2001, filling the casual vacancy created by Sam de Beer's resignation. During the legislative term that followed, he served as the UDM's spokesman on safety and security and also deputised Kingsley Masemola as the party's deputy national chairperson.

Maseka left Parliament after the 2004 general election and registered his own political party, the MDP, to contest the next general election in 2009; he was MDP's president. The party did not win any seats in 2004. It nonetheless remained active and Maseka was campaigning for it ahead of the 2016 local elections at the time of his death.

== Personal life and death ==
On 13 July 2016, Maseka was shot dead in an armed robbery at a funeral parlour he owned in Ga-Rankuwa. Eyewitness News reported that it was viewed as a possible assassination. He had children and grandchildren.
