= Umvoti Local Municipality elections =

Local elections in KwaZulu-Natal, South Africa

The Umvoti Local Municipality council consists of twenty-seven members elected by mixed-member proportional representation. Fourteen councillors are elected by first-past-the-post voting in fourteen wards, while the remaining thirteen are chosen from party lists so that the total number of party representatives is proportional to the number of votes received.

In the election of 3 August 2016 the African National Congress (ANC) won a majority of fifteen seats on the council. The party lost its majority in the election of 1 November 2021, obtaining a plurality of ten.

No party won a majority in the election of 4 November 2026, with the Inkatha Freedom Party winning the most seats, nine.

== Results ==
The following table shows the composition of the council after past elections.

Event	ANC	DA	IFP	MKP	Other	Total
2000 election	5	2	13	—	0	20
2006 election	8	1	12	—	0	21
2011 election	10	1	9	—	2	22
2016 election	15	1	11	—	0	27
2021 election	10	1	9	—	7	27
2026 election	8	1	9	8	1	27

== December 2000 election ==
The following table shows the results of the 2000 election.

Party	Ward			List			Total seats
Party	Votes	%	Seats	Votes	%	Seats	Total seats
Inkatha Freedom Party	8,931	61.79	8	9,104	62.96	5	13
African National Congress	3,229	22.34	1	3,019	20.88	4	5
Democratic Alliance	1,580	10.93	2	1,583	10.95	0	2
Zibambeleni Development Organisation	523	3.62	0	753	5.21	0	0
Independent candidates	190	1.31	0				0
Total	14,453	100.00	11	14,459	100.00	9	20
Valid votes	14,453	97.42		14,459	97.56		
Invalid/blank votes	383	2.58		362	2.44		
Total votes	14,836	100.00		14,821	100.00		
Registered voters/turnout	34,542	42.95		34,542	42.91		

== March 2006 election ==
The following table shows the results of the 2006 election.

Party	Ward			List			Total seats
Party	Votes	%	Seats	Votes	%	Seats	Total seats
Inkatha Freedom Party	10,764	54.87	8	10,643	54.31	4	12
African National Congress	7,241	36.91	3	7,489	38.22	5	8
Democratic Alliance	1,116	5.69	0	1,129	5.76	1	1
National Democratic Convention	375	1.91	0	334	1.70	0	0
Independent candidates	123	0.63	0				0
Total	19,619	100.00	11	19,595	100.00	10	21
Valid votes	19,619	97.87		19,595	97.73		
Invalid/blank votes	427	2.13		455	2.27		
Total votes	20,046	100.00		20,050	100.00		
Registered voters/turnout	39,418	50.85		39,418	50.87		

== May 2011 election ==
The following table shows the results of the 2011 election.

Party	Ward			List			Total seats
Party	Votes	%	Seats	Votes	%	Seats	Total seats
African National Congress	11,733	42.42	6	12,052	43.58	4	10
Inkatha Freedom Party	11,426	41.31	5	11,295	40.84	4	9
National Freedom Party	2,610	9.44	0	2,638	9.54	2	2
Democratic Alliance	1,547	5.59	0	1,473	5.33	1	1
Minority Front	343	1.24	0	197	0.71	0	0
Total	27,659	100.00	11	27,655	100.00	11	22
Valid votes	27,659	97.94		27,655	98.20		
Invalid/blank votes	583	2.06		506	1.80		
Total votes	28,242	100.00		28,161	100.00		
Registered voters/turnout	44,464	63.52		44,464	63.33		

== August 2016 election ==
The following table shows the results of the 2016 election.

Party	Ward			List			Total seats
Party	Votes	%	Seats	Votes	%	Seats	Total seats
African National Congress	19,860	53.56	10	20,050	54.22	5	15
Inkatha Freedom Party	14,858	40.07	4	15,079	40.77	7	11
Democratic Alliance	1,320	3.56	0	1,370	3.70	1	1
Economic Freedom Fighters	599	1.62	0	483	1.31	0	0
Independent candidates	446	1.20	0				0
Total	37,083	100.00	14	36,982	100.00	13	27
Valid votes	37,083	98.20		36,982	98.34		
Invalid/blank votes	678	1.80		626	1.66		
Total votes	37,761	100.00		37,608	100.00		
Registered voters/turnout	58,550	64.49		58,550	64.23		

== November 2021 election ==
The following table shows the results of the 2021 election.

Party	Ward			List			Total seats
Party	Votes	%	Seats	Votes	%	Seats	Total seats
African National Congress	11,847	35.97	6	11,921	36.29	4	10
Inkatha Freedom Party	10,797	32.78	5	11,113	33.83	4	9
Abantu Batho Congress	8,004	24.30	3	8,162	24.85	4	7
Democratic Alliance	749	2.27	0	766	2.33	1	1
Economic Freedom Fighters	594	1.80	0	511	1.56	0	0
Independent candidates	511	1.55	0				0
African Mantungwa Community	246	0.75	0	158	0.48	0	0
National Freedom Party	113	0.34	0	137	0.42	0	0
African Transformation Movement	75	0.23	0	82	0.25	0	0
Total	32,936	100.00	14	32,850	100.00	13	27
Valid votes	32,936	98.50		32,850	98.03		
Invalid/blank votes	501	1.50		661	1.97		
Total votes	33,437	100.00		33,511	100.00		
Registered voters/turnout	59,501	56.20		59,501	56.32		

With no party obtaining a majority, the council has experienced instability, with multiple short-lived coalitions. Following the election, the Abantu Batho Congress (ABC) and Inkatha Freedom Party (IFP) formed a coalition. In 2023, the African National Congress (ANC) and ABC agreed on a coalition. In May 2024, the IFP and ANC formed a coalition. The coalition collapsed again in October 2025, when the ANC and ABC again agreed to form a coalition.

=== By-elections from November 2021 ===
The following by-elections were held to fill vacant ward seats in the period from the election in November 2021.

Date	Ward	Party of the previous councillor	Party of the newly elected councillor
31 May 2022	13	African National Congress	African National Congress
3 Aug 2022	5	Inkatha Freedom Party	Inkatha Freedom Party
5 Apr 2023	6	Inkatha Freedom Party	Inkatha Freedom Party
14 Jun 2023	2	African National Congress	Inkatha Freedom Party
19 Jun 2024	10	Abantu Batho Congress	Inkatha Freedom Party

After the death of the previous ward two councillor, a by-election was held on 14 June 2023. In 2021, the African National Congress (ANC) won the ward with 47% of the vote. In the by-election, the Inkatha Freedom Party (IFP) gained support from both the ANC and the Abantu Batho Congress (ABC), winning the ward with 53%, and becoming the largest party in the council. At the time, the ANC and ABC had a working arrangement, and together made up a majority 16 of the 27 seats.

== November 2026 election ==
The following table shows the results of the 2026 election.

Party	Ward			List			Total seats
Party	Votes	%	Seats	Votes	%	Seats	Total seats
Inkatha Freedom Party	12,382	33.91	8	12,229	33.47	1	9
African National Congress	11,061	30.29	2	10,954	29.98	6	8
uMkhonto weSizwe Party	9,875	27.04	3	10,048	27.50	5	8
Democratic Alliance	1,552	4.25	1	1,567	4.29	0	1
Abantu Batho Congress	907	2.48	0	985	2.70	1	1
Economic Freedom Fighters	180	0.49	0	193	0.53	0	0
National Freedom Party	133	0.36	0	142	0.39	0	0
Abantu Bezwelethu Congress Democracy	96	0.26	0	144	0.39	0	0
Justice and Employment Party	93	0.25	0	77	0.21	0	0
Afrika Mayibuye Movement	59	0.16	0	55	0.15	0	0
South African Communist Party	62	0.17	0	51	0.14	0	0
Patriotic Alliance	67	0.18	0	38	0.10	0	0
African Transformation Movement	50	0.14	0	54	0.15	0	0
Total	36,517	100.00	14	36,537	100.00	13	27
Valid votes	36,517	98.76		36,537	98.71		
Invalid/blank votes	459	1.24		479	1.29		
Total votes	36,976	100.00		37,016	100.00		
Registered voters/turnout	65,647	56.33		65,647	56.39		
