= EThekwini elections =

Local elections in South Africa

The eThekwini Metropolitan Municipality council consists of 223 members elected by mixed-member proportional representation. 112 councillors are elected by first-past-the-post voting in 112 wards, while the remaining 111 are chosen from party lists so that the total number of party representatives is proportional to the number of votes received.

== Results ==
The following table shows the composition of the council after past elections.

Event	ACDP	ANC	DA	EFF	IFP	MF	Other	Total
2000 election	2	95	53	—	35	10	5	200
2006 election	3	117	34	—	23	13	10	200
2011 election	2	126	43	—	9	11	14	205
2016 election	1	126	61	8	10	1	12	219
2021 election	2	96	59	24	16	1	24	222
2026 election	1	37	57	4	15	1	84	223

== December 2000 election ==
The following table shows the results of the 2000 election.

Ethekwini local election, 5 December 2000
Party	Votes				Seats		
Party	Ward	List	Total	%	Ward	List	Total
African National Congress	237,855	237,996	475,851	46.9%	61	34	95
Democratic Alliance	127,028	137,970	264,998	26.1%	29	24	53
Inkatha Freedom Party	88,073	88,300	176,373	17.4%	7	28	35
Minority Front	26,007	23,656	49,663	4.9%	2	8	10
Independent candidates	12,889	–	12,889	1.3%	1	–	1
African Christian Democratic Party	3,828	8,114	11,942	1.2%	0	2	2
Pan Africanist Congress of Azania	3,572	2,509	6,081	0.6%	0	1	1
Action Independent Peoples Party	2,544	2,534	5,078	0.5%	0	1	1
ECOPEACE Party	2,654	1,599	4,253	0.4%	0	1	1
National United People's Organisation	742	1,337	2,079	0.2%	0	1	1
Azanian People's Organisation	387	1,325	1,712	0.2%	0	0	0
United Democratic Movement	–	1,662	1,662	0.2%	–	0	0
Socialist Party of Azania	394	907	1,301	0.1%	0	0	0
Total	505,973	507,909	1,013,882		100	100	200
Valid votes	505,973	507,909	1,013,882	98.3%			
Spoilt votes	8,834	8,336	17,170	1.7%			
Total votes cast	514,807	516,245	1,031,052				
Voter turnout	517,341						
Registered voters	1,233,786						
Turnout percentage	41.9%						

== March 2006 election ==
The following table shows the results of the 2006 election.

Ethekwini local election, 1 March 2006
Party	Votes				Seats		
Party	Ward	List	Total	%	Ward	List	Total
African National Congress	340,307	352,763	693,070	57.6%	73	44	117
Democratic Alliance	98,986	101,412	200,398	16.7%	16	18	34
Inkatha Freedom Party	65,828	67,668	133,496	11.1%	3	20	23
Minority Front	37,396	37,384	74,780	6.2%	7	6	13
Independent candidates	27,439	–	27,439	2.3%	1	–	1
African Christian Democratic Party	9,615	9,629	19,244	1.6%	0	3	3
National Democratic Convention	5,708	6,386	12,094	1.0%	0	2	2
Independent Democrats	4,663	5,528	10,191	0.8%	0	2	2
Truly Alliance	4,239	4,193	8,432	0.7%	0	2	2
Scara Civic Party	1,948	2,047	3,995	0.3%	0	1	1
United Democratic Movement	1,791	1,931	3,722	0.3%	0	1	1
Azanian People's Organisation	1,428	1,430	2,858	0.2%	0	1	1
Pan Africanist Congress of Azania	889	1,528	2,417	0.2%	0	0	0
Freedom Front Plus	972	1,228	2,200	0.2%	0	0	0
United Independent Front	244	1,757	2,001	0.2%	0	0	0
ECOPEACE Party	729	1,156	1,885	0.2%	0	0	0
National United People's Organisation	1,007	722	1,729	0.1%	0	0	0
United Christian Democratic Party	264	1,339	1,603	0.1%	0	0	0
Socialist Party of Azania	361	1,127	1,488	0.1%	0	0	0
Izwi Lethu Party	168	–	168	0.0%	0	–	0
Total	603,982	599,228	1,203,210		100	100	200
Valid votes	603,982	599,228	1,203,210	98.3%			
Spoilt votes	9,939	11,331	21,270	1.7%			
Total votes cast	613,921	610,559	1,224,480				
Voter turnout	616,256						
Registered voters	1,385,923						
Turnout percentage	44.5%						

== May 2011 election ==
The following table shows the results of the 2011 election.

eThekwini local election, 18 May 2011
Party	Votes				Seats		
Party	Ward	List	Total	%	Ward	List	Total
African National Congress	582,224	603,929	1,186,153	61.1%	78	48	126
Democratic Alliance	195,770	212,409	408,179	21.0%	17	26	43
Minority Front	54,979	48,064	103,043	5.3%	6	5	11
National Freedom Party	47,688	43,606	91,294	4.7%	0	10	10
Inkatha Freedom Party	41,638	38,532	80,170	4.1%	1	8	9
Independent candidates	17,226	–	17,226	0.9%	1	–	1
African Christian Democratic Party	7,727	6,555	14,282	0.7%	0	2	2
Truly Alliance	7,994	6,026	14,020	0.7%	0	1	1
Congress of the People	3,428	3,882	7,310	0.4%	0	1	1
African People's Convention	1,914	3,970	5,884	0.3%	0	1	1
United Action Front	1,993	1,256	3,249	0.2%	0	0	0
Azanian People's Organisation	1,400	1,238	2,638	0.1%	0	0	0
United Democratic Movement	1,455	1,087	2,542	0.1%	0	0	0
African Christian Alliance-Afrikaner Christen Alliansie	1,158	949	2,107	0.1%	0	0	0
Freedom Front Plus	869	662	1,531	0.1%	0	0	0
Socialist Green Coalition	531	492	1,023	0.1%	0	0	0
Black Consciousness Party	245	671	916	0.0%	0	0	0
Solidarity Party	172	400	572	0.0%	0	0	0
United Residents Front	142	–	142	0.0%	0	–	0
Total	968,553	973,728	1,942,281		103	102	205
Valid votes	968,553	973,728	1,942,281	98.5%			
Spoilt votes	15,755	12,864	28,619	1.5%			
Total votes cast	984,308	986,592	1,970,900				
Voter turnout	990,263						
Registered voters	1,666,549						
Turnout percentage	59.4%						

== August 2016 election ==
The following table shows the results of the 2016 election.

eThekwini local election, 3 August 2016
Party	Votes				Seats		
Party	Ward	List	Total	%	Ward	List	Total
African National Congress	593,621	652,891	1,246,512	56.0%	74	52	126
Democratic Alliance	294,867	304,206	599,073	26.9%	30	31	61
Independent candidates	93,432	–	93,432	4.2%	4	–	4
Inkatha Freedom Party	46,154	47,260	93,414	4.2%	2	8	10
Economic Freedom Fighters	36,552	40,087	76,639	3.4%	0	8	8
African Independent Congress	13,772	16,673	30,445	1.4%	0	3	3
African Christian Democratic Party	6,147	5,956	12,103	0.5%	0	1	1
Minority Front	6,725	5,070	11,795	0.5%	0	1	1
Democratic Liberal Congress	6,714	4,801	11,515	0.5%	0	1	1
Truly Alliance	4,452	4,686	9,138	0.4%	0	1	1
Minorities of South Africa	3,870	3,018	6,888	0.3%	0	1	1
African People's Convention	1,695	2,922	4,617	0.2%	0	1	1
Al Jama-ah	2,284	2,003	4,287	0.2%	0	1	1
African Mantungwa Community	1,469	1,935	3,404	0.2%	0	0	0
United Peoples Party	1,873	1,469	3,342	0.2%	0	0	0
People's Revolutionary Movement	1,053	1,823	2,876	0.1%	0	0	0
Independent People's Party	944	1,498	2,442	0.1%	0	0	0
Congress of the People	709	1,566	2,275	0.1%	0	0	0
Freedom Front Plus	1,122	1,129	2,251	0.1%	0	0	0
Allied Movement for Change	1,023	860	1,883	0.1%	0	0	0
Pan Africanist Congress of Azania	790	1,041	1,831	0.1%	0	0	0
United Democratic Movement	73	1,324	1,397	0.1%	0	0	0
Independent Ratepayers Association of SA	537	439	976	0.0%	0	0	0
Academic Congress Union	439	486	925	0.0%	0	0	0
Azanian People's Organisation	413	476	889	0.0%	0	0	0
United Residents Front	270	342	612	0.0%	0	0	0
South African Political Party	18	328	346	0.0%	0	0	0
The Promise of Freedom	35	263	298	0.0%	0	0	0
Total	1,121,053	1,104,552	2,225,605		110	109	219
Valid votes	1,121,053	1,104,552	2,225,605	97.8%			
Spoilt votes	20,298	29,978	50,276	2.2%			
Total votes cast	1,141,351	1,134,530	2,275,881				
Voter turnout	1,148,559						
Registered voters	1,919,724						
Turnout percentage	59.8%						

== November 2021 election ==
The following table shows the results of the 2021 election.

eThekwini local election, 1 November 2021
Party	Votes				Seats		
Party	Ward	List	Total	%	Ward	List	Total
African National Congress	324,137	329,307	653,444	42.1%	75	21	96
Democratic Alliance	198,433	203,980	402,413	25.9%	34	25	59
Economic Freedom Fighters	78,748	83,699	162,447	10.5%	0	24	24
Inkatha Freedom Party	51,725	57,722	109,447	7.1%	2	14	16
Independent candidates	32,987	–	32,987	2.1%	0	–	0
ActionSA	11,663	18,201	29,864	1.9%	0	4	4
Active Citizens Coalition	8,025	6,239	14,264	0.9%	0	2	2
African Christian Democratic Party	6,022	5,893	11,915	0.8%	0	2	2
Abantu Batho Congress	5,866	4,998	10,864	0.7%	0	2	2
African Independent Congress	2,524	7,809	10,333	0.7%	0	2	2
African Transformation Movement	5,131	4,418	9,549	0.6%	0	1	1
Justice and Employment Party	3,959	4,763	8,722	0.6%	0	1	1
Democratic Liberal Congress	4,739	3,439	8,178	0.5%	0	1	1
African Democratic Change	4,328	3,507	7,835	0.5%	0	1	1
Minority Front	3,661	3,900	7,561	0.5%	0	1	1
United Independent Movement	2,919	2,895	5,814	0.4%	0	1	1
Minorities of South Africa	3,084	2,226	5,310	0.3%	0	1	1
National Freedom Party	2,493	2,782	5,275	0.3%	0	1	1
People's Revolutionary Movement	1,903	2,184	4,087	0.3%	0	1	1
Freedom Front Plus	1,954	2,021	3,975	0.3%	0	1	1
Truly Alliance	1,822	1,871	3,693	0.2%	0	1	1
KZN Independence	1,541	2,127	3,668	0.2%	0	1	1
People's Freedom Party	2,058	1,558	3,616	0.2%	0	1	1
African People First	829	2,171	3,000	0.2%	0	1	1
Al Jama-ah	1,578	1,368	2,946	0.2%	0	1	1
Independent People's Party	848	1,906	2,754	0.2%	0	0	0
Patriotic Alliance	993	1,522	2,515	0.2%	0	0	0
Cape Coloured Congress	2,282	–	2,282	0.1%	0	–	0
Good	1,192	1,071	2,263	0.1%	0	0	0
African People's Convention	1,193	962	2,155	0.1%	0	0	0
Pan Africanist Congress of Azania	899	990	1,889	0.1%	0	0	0
Activists Movement of South Africa	917	603	1,520	0.1%	0	0	0
African Freedom Revolution	621	823	1,444	0.1%	0	0	0
African Mantungwa Community	531	646	1,177	0.1%	0	0	0
Black First Land First	376	728	1,104	0.1%	0	0	0
Congress of the People	182	898	1,080	0.1%	0	0	0
United Christian Democratic Party	374	626	1,000	0.1%	0	0	0
Advanced Dynamic Alliance	486	481	967	0.1%	0	0	0
Forum for Service Delivery	247	521	768	0.0%	0	0	0
Allied Movement for Change	510	251	761	0.0%	0	0	0
The Organic Humanity Movement	323	408	731	0.0%	0	0	0
Academic Congress Union	289	379	668	0.0%	0	0	0
Democratic People's Congress	290	343	633	0.0%	0	0	0
African People's Movement	285	298	583	0.0%	0	0	0
Africa Restoration Alliance	352	203	555	0.0%	0	0	0
Azanian People's Organisation	291	260	551	0.0%	0	0	0
God Save Africa	168	376	544	0.0%	0	0	0
United Cultural Movement	119	294	413	0.0%	0	0	0
African Federal Convention	64	323	387	0.0%	0	0	0
International Party	19	364	383	0.0%	0	0	0
African Basic Republicans	–	207	207	0.0%	–	0	0
Spectrum National Party	19	175	194	0.0%	0	0	0
Federal Party SA	12	–	12	0.0%	0	–	0
Land Party	4	–	4	0.0%	0	–	0
Total	776,015	774,736	1,550,751		111	111	222
Valid votes	776,015	774,736	1,550,751	97.9%			
Spoilt votes	14,555	18,841	33,396	2.1%			
Total votes cast	790,570	793,577	1,584,147				
Voter turnout	804,545						
Registered voters	1,909,125						
Turnout percentage	42.1%						

=== By-elections from November 2021 ===
The following by-elections were held to fill vacant ward seats in the period since the election in November 2021.

Date	Ward	Party of the previous councillor	Party of the newly elected councillor
2 Feb 2022	101	African National Congress	African National Congress
2 Nov 2022	10	Democratic Alliance	Democratic Alliance
14 Dec 2022	99	African National Congress	Inkatha Freedom Party
24 May 2023	73	Democratic Alliance	Democratic Alliance
28 Jun 2023	11	Democratic Alliance	Democratic Alliance
25 Oct 2023	9	Democratic Alliance	African National Congress
13 Dec 2023	101	African National Congress	African National Congress
28 Aug 2024	34	Democratic Alliance	Independent politician
11 Sep 2024	33	Democratic Alliance	Democratic Alliance
11 Sep 2024	35	Democratic Alliance	Democratic Alliance
11 Sep 2024	36	Democratic Alliance	Democratic Alliance
16 Apr 2025	110	Democratic Alliance	uMkhonto weSizwe
17 Sep 2025	64	Democratic Alliance	Democratic Alliance

After the death of the DA councillor in ward 10, a by-election was held on 2 November 2022, consisting of candidates from the DA, ANC, IFP, EFF and eThekwini deputy mayor and Abantu Batho Congress (ABC) leader Philani Mavundla. The DA retained the seat, increasing its support from 80% to 95%, with Mavundla coming third, on 1%.

After the murder of the ANC councillor in ward 99, a by-election was held on 14 December 2022. The DA and the IFP agreed on an electoral pact, with the DA standing aside, and asking its supporters to vote for the IFP candidate. The IFP won 62% of the vote, with the ANC second on 36%.

== November 2026 election ==
The following table shows the results of the 2021 election.

Party	Ward			List			Total seats
Party	Votes	%	Seats	Votes	%	Seats	Total seats
uMkhonto weSizwe Party	386,929	38.34	73	386,507	38.26	13	86
Democratic Alliance	250,371	24.81	33	263,788	26.11	24	57
African National Congress	167,799	16.63	2	163,807	16.21	35	37
Inkatha Freedom Party	70,766	7.01	4	66,416	6.57	11	15
ActionSA	26,062	2.58	0	31,504	3.12	7	7
Economic Freedom Fighters	16,729	1.66	0	15,891	1.57	4	4
Freedom Front Plus	8,517	0.84	0	8,781	0.87	2	2
African Transformation Movement	8,085	0.80	0	7,935	0.79	2	2
Ethekwini Ratepayers Political Movement	7,258	0.72	0	5,158	0.51	2	2
Patriotic Alliance	4,776	0.47	0	4,450	0.44	1	1
South African Communist Party	4,348	0.43	0	3,661	0.36	1	1
African Christian Democratic Party	3,624	0.36	0	4,240	0.42	1	1
Minority Front	4,092	0.41	0	3,534	0.35	1	1
Al Jama-ah	3,951	0.39	0	3,546	0.35	1	1
1860NIC Congress	3,604	0.36	0	3,071	0.30	1	1
Democratic Liberal Congress	3,641	0.36	0	2,435	0.24	1	1
African Independent Congress	2,737	0.27	0	2,634	0.26	1	1
Independent People's Party	1,959	0.19	0	2,433	0.24	1	1
Independent candidates	4,334	0.43	0				0
People's Revolutionary Movement	1,886	0.19	0	1,553	0.15	1	1
People's Freedom Party	1,648	0.16	0	1,435	0.14	1	1
Afrika Mayibuye Movement	1,523	0.15	0	1,302	0.13	0	0
Indian Congress Party	1,303	0.13	0	1,210	0.12	0	0
African Democratic Change	1,349	0.13	0	1,073	0.11	0	0
Active Citizens Coalition	1,101	0.11	0	1,230	0.12	0	0
African Movement Congress	987	0.10	0	1,270	0.13	0	0
Pan Africanist Congress of Azania	1,095	0.11	0	1,041	0.10	0	0
Minorities of South Africa	1,065	0.11	0	753	0.07	0	0
Justice and Employment Party	920	0.09	0	862	0.09	0	0
KZN Independence	990	0.10	0	743	0.07	0	0
African Heart Congress	658	0.07	0	1,072	0.11	0	0
A Shall-X Party	967	0.10	0	705	0.07	0	0
People's Progressive Party	876	0.09	0	599	0.06	0	0
Service Delivery Front	910	0.09	0	509	0.05	0	0
African Unemployed Congress	837	0.08	0	581	0.06	0	0
National Freedom Party	611	0.06	0	785	0.08	0	0
Truly Alliance	858	0.09	0	521	0.05	0	0
African Alliance Congress	757	0.08	0	584	0.06	0	0
Truth and Solidarity Movement	560	0.06	0	771	0.08	0	0
All Natives of South Africa	754	0.07	0	540	0.05	0	0
Next Generation Government	497	0.05	0	666	0.07	0	0
African People First	486	0.05	0	588	0.06	0	0
Organic Humanity Movement	376	0.04	0	664	0.07	0	0
African Mantungwa Community	623	0.06	0	405	0.04	0	0
Arusha Economic Coalition	708	0.07	0	309	0.03	0	0
Abantu Batho Congress	158	0.02	0	674	0.07	0	0
People's First United	502	0.05	0	330	0.03	0	0
African Renaissance Unity	224	0.02	0	606	0.06	0	0
Abantu Bezwelethu Congress Democracy	8	0.00	0	801	0.08	0	0
Bumbana Mzansi	252	0.02	0	471	0.05	0	0
United Christian Democratic Party	358	0.04	0	320	0.03	0	0
Afro Natives	413	0.04	0	263	0.03	0	0
Ekhethu Peoples Party	211	0.02	0	434	0.04	0	0
National Peoples Ambassadors	245	0.02	0	357	0.04	0	0
African Economic Freedom	269	0.03	0	263	0.03	0	0
Africa Restoration Alliance	260	0.03	0	253	0.03	0	0
Inkululeko Yabantu Movement	200	0.02	0	305	0.03	0	0
Azanian People's Organisation	328	0.03	0	171	0.02	0	0
People's Power Freedom Party	84	0.01	0	408	0.04	0	0
Umkhumbi Wesizwe Organisation				482	0.05	0	0
National Dialogue Front	236	0.02	0	233	0.02	0	0
Service Delivery Party	218	0.02	0	238	0.02	0	0
African Congress for Transformation	194	0.02	0	250	0.02	0	0
Gods Justice and Development Party	199	0.02	0	242	0.02	0	0
South African Peoples Movement	154	0.02	0	287	0.03	0	0
Sizwe Ummah Nation	243	0.02	0	131	0.01	0	0
African Security Congress	230	0.02	0	138	0.01	0	0
African Restoration Movement	202	0.02	0	158	0.02	0	0
Afrika Unite Congress	40	0.00	0	233	0.02	0	0
Mawusa Movement Party	13	0.00	0	251	0.02	0	0
African Royal Rainbow Congress	38	0.00	0	179	0.02	0	0
Operation Dudula	28	0.00	0	185	0.02	0	0
Total	1,009,234	100.00	112	1,010,225	100.00	111	223
Valid votes	1,009,234	98.04		1,010,225	98.03		
Invalid/blank votes	20,206	1.96		20,320	1.97		
Total votes	1,029,440	100.00		1,030,545	100.00		
Registered voters/turnout	2,032,565	50.65		2,032,565	50.70		
