= UMdoni Local Municipality elections =

Local elections in KwaZulu-Natal, South Africa

The uMdoni Local Municipality council consists of thirty-seven members elected by mixed-member proportional representation. Nineteen councillors are elected by first-past-the-post voting in nineteen wards, while the remaining eighteen are chosen from party lists so that the total number of party representatives is proportional to the number of votes received.

In the election of 4 November 2026, no party won a majority. The uMkhonto weSizwe Party (MKP) won the most seats, with fifteen.

== Results ==
The following table shows the composition of the council after past elections.

Event	AJ	ANC	DA	EFF	IFP	MF	MKP	Other	Total
2000 election	—	6	4	—	5	1	—	2	18
2006 election	—	9	3	—	3	2	—	1	18
2011 election	—	12	4	—	1	1	—	1	19
2016 election	1	23	7	1	3	—	—	2	37
2021 election	1	17	7	5	5	—	—	2	37
2026 election	1	9	7	1	4	—	15	0	37

== December 2000 election ==
The following table shows the results of the 2000 election.

Party	Ward			List			Total seats
Party	Votes	%	Seats	Votes	%	Seats	Total seats
African National Congress	4,075	32.09	5	4,007	31.66	1	6
Inkatha Freedom Party	3,647	28.72	2	3,678	29.06	3	5
Democratic Alliance	2,711	21.35	2	2,904	22.94	2	4
Ratepayers and Residents Party Simunye	1,668	13.13	0	1,444	11.41	2	2
Minority Front	598	4.71	0	625	4.94	1	1
Total	12,699	100.00	9	12,658	100.00	9	18
Valid votes	12,699	97.27		12,658	97.20		
Invalid/blank votes	357	2.73		365	2.80		
Total votes	13,056	100.00		13,023	100.00		
Registered voters/turnout	29,549	44.18		29,549	44.07		

== March 2006 election ==
The following table shows the results of the 2006 election.

Party	Ward			List			Total seats
Party	Votes	%	Seats	Votes	%	Seats	Total seats
African National Congress	7,828	53.55	7	7,781	53.29	2	9
Inkatha Freedom Party	2,510	17.17	0	2,488	17.04	3	3
Democratic Alliance	2,278	15.58	2	2,280	15.62	1	3
Minority Front	1,441	9.86	0	1,433	9.81	2	2
African Christian Democratic Party	561	3.84	0	619	4.24	1	1
Total	14,618	100.00	9	14,601	100.00	9	18
Valid votes	14,618	97.79		14,601	97.55		
Invalid/blank votes	330	2.21		367	2.45		
Total votes	14,948	100.00		14,968	100.00		
Registered voters/turnout	32,452	46.06		32,452	46.12		

== May 2011 election ==
The following table shows the results of the 2011 election.

Party	Ward			List			Total seats
Party	Votes	%	Seats	Votes	%	Seats	Total seats
African National Congress	14,847	62.57	8	15,162	63.81	4	12
Democratic Alliance	4,753	20.03	1	4,824	20.30	3	4
Minority Front	1,593	6.71	1	1,500	6.31	0	1
National Freedom Party	1,328	5.60	0	1,233	5.19	1	1
Inkatha Freedom Party	695	2.93	0	681	2.87	1	1
African Christian Democratic Party	281	1.18	0	235	0.99	0	0
Congress of the People	107	0.45	0	128	0.54	0	0
Independent candidates	126	0.53	0				0
Total	23,730	100.00	10	23,763	100.00	9	19
Valid votes	23,730	98.42		23,763	98.42		
Invalid/blank votes	381	1.58		381	1.58		
Total votes	24,111	100.00		24,144	100.00		
Registered voters/turnout	38,411	62.77		38,411	62.86		

== August 2016 election ==
The following table shows the results of the 2016 election.

Party	Ward			List			Total seats
Party	Votes	%	Seats	Votes	%	Seats	Total seats
African National Congress	24,471	58.20	16	25,959	61.87	7	23
Democratic Alliance	7,210	17.15	2	7,487	17.84	5	7
Inkatha Freedom Party	3,798	9.03	0	3,763	8.97	3	3
Economic Freedom Fighters	1,321	3.14	0	1,319	3.14	1	1
Allied Movement for Change	1,274	3.03	1	1,106	2.64	0	1
Independent candidates	1,938	4.61	0				0
African Independent Congress	694	1.65	0	887	2.11	1	1
Al Jama-ah	687	1.63	0	648	1.54	1	1
African Mantungwa Community	470	1.12	0	568	1.35	0	0
African Christian Democratic Party	183	0.44	0	221	0.53	0	0
Total	42,046	100.00	19	41,958	100.00	18	37
Valid votes	42,046	97.21		41,958	96.96		
Invalid/blank votes	1,207	2.79		1,314	3.04		
Total votes	43,253	100.00		43,272	100.00		
Registered voters/turnout	71,880	60.17		71,880	60.20		

== November 2021 election ==
The following table shows the results of the 2021 election.

Party	Ward			List			Total seats
Party	Votes	%	Seats	Votes	%	Seats	Total seats
African National Congress	15,122	44.37	15	14,955	43.93	2	17
Democratic Alliance	6,043	17.73	4	6,150	18.06	3	7
Inkatha Freedom Party	4,605	13.51	0	4,948	14.53	5	5
Economic Freedom Fighters	3,999	11.73	0	3,989	11.72	5	5
Allied Movement for Change	1,153	3.38	0	1,025	3.01	1	1
Abantu Batho Congress	746	2.19	0	688	2.02	1	1
Al Jama-ah	539	1.58	0	522	1.53	1	1
Independent candidates	619	1.82	0				0
African Independent Congress				472	1.39	0	0
People's Freedom Party	238	0.70	0	118	0.35	0	0
African Mantungwa Community	191	0.56	0	102	0.30	0	0
Justice and Employment Party	113	0.33	0	163	0.48	0	0
African Transformation Movement	128	0.38	0	136	0.40	0	0
African Christian Democratic Party	120	0.35	0	139	0.41	0	0
Freedom Front Plus	128	0.38	0	131	0.38	0	0
National Freedom Party	80	0.23	0	122	0.36	0	0
Democratic Freedom Alliance	49	0.14	0	152	0.45	0	0
Revolutionary Democratic Patriots	76	0.22	0	58	0.17	0	0
African People's Convention	71	0.21	0	51	0.15	0	0
African People's Movement	31	0.09	0	21	0.06	0	0
African Freedom Revolution	19	0.06	0	32	0.09	0	0
African People First	11	0.03	0	33	0.10	0	0
African Basic Republicans				37	0.11	0	0
Total	34,081	100.00	19	34,044	100.00	18	37
Valid votes	34,081	98.25		34,044	97.83		
Invalid/blank votes	606	1.75		756	2.17		
Total votes	34,687	100.00		34,800	100.00		
Registered voters/turnout	71,831	48.29		71,831	48.45		

=== By-elections from November 2021 ===
The following by-elections were held to fill vacant ward seats in the period since November 2021.

Date	Ward	Party of the previous councillor	Party of the newly elected councillor
27 Jul 2022	13	Democratic Alliance	African National Congress
30 Nov 2022	10	Democratic Alliance	Democratic Alliance
11 Sep 2024	15	Democratic Alliance	Democratic Alliance

After the resignation of the previous DA ward 10 councillor, a by-election was held on 30 November 2022. The DA's candidate retained the seat for the party, winning an 88% share.

After the 27 July by-election, the council was reconfigured as below:

Party	Seats		
Party	Ward	List	Total
African National Congress	16	2	18
Democratic Alliance	3	3	6
Inkatha Freedom Party	0	5	5
Economic Freedom Fighters	0	5	5
Allied Movement for Change	0	1	1
Abantu Batho Congress	0	1	1
Al Jama-ah	0	1	1
Total	19	18	37

== November 2026 election ==
The following table shows the results of the 2026 election.

Party	Ward			List			Total seats
Party	Votes	%	Seats	Votes	%	Seats	Total seats
uMkhonto weSizwe Party	18,807	39.67	11	19,183	40.35	4	15
African National Congress	11,566	24.40	2	11,582	24.36	7	9
Democratic Alliance	8,079	17.04	4	8,389	17.64	3	7
Inkatha Freedom Party	5,536	11.68	2	5,426	11.41	2	4
Economic Freedom Fighters	961	2.03	0	948	1.99	1	1
Al Jama-ah	497	1.05	0	475	1.00	1	1
African Independent Congress	337	0.71	0	250	0.53	0	0
African Transformation Movement	258	0.54	0	300	0.63	0	0
People's Freedom Party	222	0.47	0	209	0.44	0	0
Independent candidates	407	0.86	0				0
Afrika Mayibuye Movement	137	0.29	0	137	0.29	0	0
Abantu Bezwelethu Congress Democracy	180	0.38	0	87	0.18	0	0
South African Communist Party	99	0.21	0	147	0.31	0	0
United Christian Democratic Party	31	0.07	0	108	0.23	0	0
All Natives of South Africa	73	0.15	0	65	0.14	0	0
Afrika Unite Congress	66	0.14	0	71	0.15	0	0
African Mantungwa Community	72	0.15	0	39	0.08	0	0
National Freedom Party	28	0.06	0	69	0.15	0	0
Active Citizens Coalition	27	0.06	0	30	0.06	0	0
Pan Africanist Congress of Azania	26	0.05	0	31	0.07	0	0
Total	47,409	100.00	19	47,546	100.00	18	37
Valid votes	47,409	98.72		47,546	98.84		
Invalid/blank votes	615	1.28		559	1.16		
Total votes	48,024	100.00		48,105	100.00		
Registered voters/turnout	84,468	56.85		84,468	56.95		
