= Msinga Local Municipality elections =

Local elections in KwaZulu-Natal, South Africa

The Msinga Local Municipality council consists of forty-one members elected by mixed-member proportional representation. Twenty-one councillors are elected by first-past-the-post voting in twenty-one wards, while the remaining twenty are chosen from party lists so that the total number of party representatives is proportional to the number of votes received.

In the election of 4 November 2026 the Inkatha Freedom Party (IFP) won a majority of twenty-five seats on the council.

== Results ==
The following table shows the composition of the council after past elections.

Event	ANC	DA	EFF	IFP	MKP	Other	Total
2000 election	4	1	—	28	—	0	33
2006 election	4	1	—	28	—	1	34
2011 election	12	0	—	21	—	4	37
2016 election	12	0	0	24	—	0	36
2021 election	11	0	1	27	—	2	41
2026 election	3	1	0	25	12	0	41

== December 2000 election ==
The following table shows the results of the 2000 election.

Party	Ward			List			Total seats
Party	Votes	%	Seats	Votes	%	Seats	Total seats
Inkatha Freedom Party	28,452	82.54	17	28,994	83.55	11	28
African National Congress	4,217	12.23	0	4,311	12.42	4	4
Democratic Alliance	1,411	4.09	0	1,396	4.02	1	1
Independent candidates	390	1.13	0				0
Total	34,470	100.00	17	34,701	100.00	16	33
Valid votes	34,470	97.82		34,701	97.80		
Invalid/blank votes	769	2.18		780	2.20		
Total votes	35,239	100.00		35,481	100.00		
Registered voters/turnout	57,758	61.01		57,758	61.43		

== March 2006 election ==
The following table shows the results of the 2006 election.

Party	Ward			List			Total seats
Party	Votes	%	Seats	Votes	%	Seats	Total seats
Inkatha Freedom Party	30,632	82.62	16	30,632	82.62	12	28
African National Congress	4,747	12.80	1	4,747	12.80	3	4
National Democratic Convention	956	2.58	0	956	2.58	1	1
Democratic Alliance	739	1.99	0	739	1.99	1	1
Total	37,074	100.00	17	37,074	100.00	17	34
Valid votes	37,074	98.20		37,074	98.20		
Invalid/blank votes	681	1.80		681	1.80		
Total votes	37,755	100.00		37,755	100.00		
Registered voters/turnout	64,284	58.73		64,284	58.73		

== May 2011 election ==
The following table shows the results of the 2011 election.

Party	Ward			List			Total seats
Party	Votes	%	Seats	Votes	%	Seats	Total seats
Inkatha Freedom Party	28,210	56.02	17	27,958	55.57	4	21
African National Congress	15,952	31.68	2	16,516	32.83	10	12
National Freedom Party	5,060	10.05	0	5,136	10.21	4	4
Democratic Alliance	715	1.42	0	484	0.96	0	0
Congress of the People	418	0.83	0	221	0.44	0	0
Total	50,355	100.00	19	50,315	100.00	18	37
Valid votes	50,355	98.35		50,315	98.10		
Invalid/blank votes	844	1.65		977	1.90		
Total votes	51,199	100.00		51,292	100.00		
Registered voters/turnout	75,067	68.20		75,067	68.33		

== August 2016 election ==
The following table shows the results of the 2016 election.

Party	Ward			List			Total seats
Party	Votes	%	Seats	Votes	%	Seats	Total seats
Inkatha Freedom Party	37,233	65.66	18	37,851	66.62	6	24
African National Congress	18,083	31.89	0	18,092	31.84	12	12
Democratic Alliance	514	0.91	0	494	0.87	0	0
Economic Freedom Fighters	545	0.96	0	380	0.67	0	0
Independent candidates	331	0.58	0				0
Total	56,706	100.00	18	56,817	100.00	18	36
Valid votes	56,706	98.65		56,817	98.77		
Invalid/blank votes	776	1.35		706	1.23		
Total votes	57,482	100.00		57,523	100.00		
Registered voters/turnout	85,368	67.33		85,368	67.38		

== November 2021 election ==
The following table shows the results of the 2021 election.

Party	Ward			List			Total seats
Party	Votes	%	Seats	Votes	%	Seats	Total seats
Inkatha Freedom Party	32,104	65.91	20	32,546	68.14	7	27
African National Congress	12,431	25.52	0	12,500	26.17	11	11
Abantu Batho Congress	1,008	2.07	0	1,477	3.09	1	1
Independent candidates	1,880	3.86	1				1
Economic Freedom Fighters	436	0.90	0	463	0.97	1	1
Democratic Alliance	276	0.57	0	240	0.50	0	0
National Freedom Party	208	0.43	0	120	0.25	0	0
Justice and Employment Party	128	0.26	0	142	0.30	0	0
United Democratic Movement	92	0.19	0	90	0.19	0	0
African Mantungwa Community	62	0.13	0	53	0.11	0	0
National People's Front	49	0.10	0	61	0.13	0	0
African Christian Democratic Party	33	0.07	0	49	0.10	0	0
African Transformation Movement	0	0.00	0	22	0.05	0	0
Total	48,707	100.00	21	47,763	100.00	20	41
Valid votes	48,707	98.34		47,763	97.56		
Invalid/blank votes	820	1.66		1,193	2.44		
Total votes	49,527	100.00		48,956	100.00		
Registered voters/turnout	86,107	57.52		86,107	56.85		

=== By-elections from November 2021 ===
The following by-elections were held to fill vacant ward seats in the period from November 2021.

Date	Ward	Party of the previous councillor	Party of the newly elected councillor
30 November 2022	11	Inkatha Freedom Party	Inkatha Freedom Party

== November 2026 election ==
The following table shows the results of the 2026 election.

Party	Ward			List			Total seats
Party	Votes	%	Seats	Votes	%	Seats	Total seats
Inkatha Freedom Party	31,030	60.66	20	31,028	60.60	5	25
uMkhonto weSizwe Party	14,662	28.66	1	14,855	29.01	11	12
African National Congress	3,853	7.53	0	3,767	7.36	3	3
Democratic Alliance	578	1.13	0	585	1.14	1	1
Economic Freedom Fighters	364	0.71	0	377	0.74	0	0
National Freedom Party	214	0.42	0	253	0.49	0	0
Justice and Employment Party	202	0.39	0	130	0.25	0	0
Afrika Mayibuye Movement	148	0.29	0	86	0.17	0	0
South African Communist Party	69	0.13	0	75	0.15	0	0
African Transformation Movement	17	0.03	0	35	0.07	0	0
National Democratic Convention	16	0.03	0	12	0.02	0	0
African Renaissance Unity	5	0.01	0				0
Total	51,158	100.00	21	51,203	100.00	20	41
Valid votes	51,158	98.57		51,203	98.74		
Invalid/blank votes	741	1.43		653	1.26		
Total votes	51,899	100.00		51,856	100.00		
Registered voters/turnout	98,150	52.88		98,150	52.83		

After the assassination of the previous IFP councillor in ward 11, a by-election was held on 30 November 2022. The IFP's candidate retained the seat for the party, winning 57% of the vote.
