= UMngeni Local Municipality elections =

Local elections in KwaZulu-Natal, South Africa

The uMngeni Local Municipality council consists of twenty-five members elected by mixed-member proportional representation. Thirteen councillors are elected by first-past-the-post voting in thirteen wards, whilst the remaining twelve are chosen from party lists so that the total number of party representatives are proportional to the number of votes received.

The African National Congress (ANC) won a majority in each of the 2000, 2006, 2011 and 2016 elections, while in the 2021 South African municipal elections the Democratic Alliance (DA) won a majority of thirteen seats in council.

In 2026, the DA increased its majority to fifteen.

== Results ==
The following table shows the composition of the council after past elections.

Event	ANC	DA	IFP	Other	Total
2000 election	11	8	2	0	21
2006 election	12	8	1	0	21
2011 election	14	9	0	0	23
2016 election	13	10	0	0	23
2021 election	10	13	0	2	25
2021 election	4	15	1	5	25

== December 2000 election ==
The following table shows the results of the 2006 election.

Party	Ward			List			Total seats
Party	Votes	%	Seats	Votes	%	Seats	Total seats
African National Congress	9,814	54.60	5	9,725	53.95	6	11
Democratic Alliance	6,484	36.07	5	6,485	35.98	3	8
Inkatha Freedom Party	1,573	8.75	1	1,670	9.26	1	2
Minority Front	75	0.42	0	145	0.80	0	0
Independent candidates	30	0.17	0				0
Total	17,976	100.00	11	18,025	100.00	10	21
Valid votes	17,976	98.37		18,025	98.52		
Invalid/blank votes	297	1.63		271	1.48		
Total votes	18,273	100.00		18,296	100.00		
Registered voters/turnout	32,209	56.73		32,209	56.80		

== March 2006 election ==
The following table shows the results of the 2006 election.

Party	Ward			List			Total seats
Party	Votes	%	Seats	Votes	%	Seats	Total seats
African National Congress	11,898	57.65	7	11,782	57.35	5	12
Democratic Alliance	7,109	34.45	4	7,246	35.27	4	8
Inkatha Freedom Party	810	3.92	0	934	4.55	1	1
African Christian Democratic Party	300	1.45	0	268	1.30	0	0
Minority Front	252	1.22	0	205	1.00	0	0
National Democratic Convention	115	0.56	0	109	0.53	0	0
Independent candidates	153	0.74	0				0
Total	20,637	100.00	11	20,544	100.00	10	21
Valid votes	20,637	97.86		20,544	98.31		
Invalid/blank votes	452	2.14		353	1.69		
Total votes	21,089	100.00		20,897	100.00		
Registered voters/turnout	36,708	57.45		36,708	56.93		

== May 2011 election ==
The following table shows the results of the 2011 election.

Party	Ward			List			Total seats
Party	Votes	%	Seats	Votes	%	Seats	Total seats
African National Congress	16,206	54.39	8	17,517	59.32	6	14
Democratic Alliance	11,253	37.77	4	11,292	38.24	5	9
Independent candidates	1,639	5.50	0				0
Inkatha Freedom Party	527	1.77	0	523	1.77	0	0
African Christian Democratic Party	171	0.57	0	197	0.67	0	0
Total	29,796	100.00	12	29,529	100.00	11	23
Valid votes	29,796	98.70		29,529	98.26		
Invalid/blank votes	391	1.30		524	1.74		
Total votes	30,187	100.00		30,053	100.00		
Registered voters/turnout	44,832	67.33		44,832	67.03		

== August 2016 election ==
The following table shows the results of the 2016 election.

Party	Ward			List			Total seats
Party	Votes	%	Seats	Votes	%	Seats	Total seats
African National Congress	19,347	55.67	8	19,469	55.91	5	13
Democratic Alliance	14,306	41.17	4	14,301	41.07	6	10
Economic Freedom Fighters	489	1.41	0	484	1.39	0	0
Inkatha Freedom Party	387	1.11	0	385	1.11	0	0
African Christian Democratic Party	190	0.55	0	183	0.53	0	0
Congress of the People	31	0.09	0				0
Total	34,750	100.00	12	34,822	100.00	11	23
Valid votes	34,750	99.15		34,822	99.07		
Invalid/blank votes	297	0.85		327	0.93		
Total votes	35,047	100.00		35,149	100.00		
Registered voters/turnout	51,564	67.97		51,564	68.17		

== November 2021 election ==
The following table shows the results of the 2021 election.

Party	Ward			List			Total seats
Party	Votes	%	Seats	Votes	%	Seats	Total seats
Democratic Alliance	14,035	46.47	5	14,310	48.37	8	13
African National Congress	11,100	36.75	8	12,319	41.64	2	10
Economic Freedom Fighters	2,122	7.03	0	2,019	6.82	2	2
Independent candidates	2,256	7.47	0				0
Inkatha Freedom Party	277	0.92	0	401	1.36	0	0
African Christian Democratic Party	270	0.89	0	295	1.00	0	0
National Freedom Party	44	0.15	0	73	0.25	0	0
Abantu Batho Congress	44	0.15	0	59	0.20	0	0
The Organic Humanity Movement	39	0.13	0	53	0.18	0	0
African Transformation Movement	13	0.04	0	54	0.18	0	0
Total	30,200	100.00	13	29,583	100.00	12	25
Valid votes	30,200	97.86		29,583	98.50		
Invalid/blank votes	660	2.14		450	1.50		
Total votes	30,860	100.00		30,033	100.00		
Registered voters/turnout	54,063	57.08		54,063	55.55		

Following the election, the DA's Chris Pappas was elected as mayor.

== November 2026 election ==
The following table shows the results of the 2026 election.

Party	Ward			List			Total seats
Party	Votes	%	Seats	Votes	%	Seats	Total seats
Democratic Alliance	23,622	59.68	10	24,782	62.59	5	15
uMkhonto weSizwe Party	7,569	19.12	1	7,196	18.17	4	5
African National Congress	6,615	16.71	2	5,903	14.91	2	4
Inkatha Freedom Party	483	1.22	0	462	1.17	1	1
Freedom Front Plus	431	1.09	0	400	1.01	0	0
Economic Freedom Fighters	344	0.87	0	308	0.78	0	0
African Christian Democratic Party	82	0.21	0	140	0.35	0	0
Next Generation Government	68	0.17	0	75	0.19	0	0
South African Communist Party	67	0.17	0	51	0.13	0	0
Active Citizens Coalition	71	0.18	0	23	0.06	0	0
Afrika Mayibuye Movement	45	0.11	0	41	0.10	0	0
African Transformation Movement	18	0.05	0	48	0.12	0	0
Al Jama-ah	28	0.07	0	33	0.08	0	0
Pan Africanist Congress of Azania	27	0.07	0	32	0.08	0	0
African Mantungwa Community	33	0.08	0	19	0.05	0	0
Organic Humanity Movement	29	0.07	0	23	0.06	0	0
Independent Councillors	23	0.06	0	17	0.04	0	0
Justice and Employment Party	16	0.04	0	12	0.03	0	0
Bumbana Mzansi	9	0.02	0	14	0.04	0	0
Truth and Solidarity Movement	3	0.01	0	17	0.04	0	0
African Renaissance Unity	0	0.00	0				0
Total	39,583	100.00	13	39,596	100.00	12	25
Valid votes	39,583	98.70		39,596	99.03		
Invalid/blank votes	523	1.30		388	0.97		
Total votes	40,106	100.00		39,984	100.00		
Registered voters/turnout	61,597	65.11		61,597	64.91		

The DA's Chris Pappas was re-elected as mayor following the election.
