= Mpofana Local Municipality elections =

Local elections in KwaZulu-Natal, South Africa

The Mpofana Local Municipality is a local municipality within the Umgungundlovu District Municipality, in the KwaZulu-Natal province of South Africa. The council consists of eleven members elected by mixed-member proportional representation. Six councillors are elected by first-past-the-post voting in six wards, while the remaining five are chosen from party lists so that the total number of party representatives is proportional to the number of votes received.

In the election of 4 November 2026, the African National Congress (ANC) lost its majority. The uMkhonto weSizwe Party won the largest number of seats on the council, with four.

== Results ==
The following table shows the composition of the council after past elections.

Event	ANC	DA	IFP	MKP	Other	Total
2000 election	4	1	2	—	0	7
2006 election	4	1	2	—	—	7
2011 election	5	1	1	—	0	7
2016 election	7	1	1	—	0	9
2021 election	7	1	1	—	1	10
2026 election	3	2	1	4	1	11

== December 2000 election ==
The following table shows the results of the 2000 election.

Party	Ward			List			Total seats
Party	Votes	%	Seats	Votes	%	Seats	Total seats
African National Congress	3,618	55.41	3	3,597	55.09	1	4
Inkatha Freedom Party	1,619	24.80	1	1,626	24.90	1	2
Democratic Alliance	930	14.24	0	983	15.06	1	1
Zibambeleni Development Organisation	362	5.54	0	323	4.95	0	0
Total	6,529	100.00	4	6,529	100.00	3	7
Valid votes	6,529	97.36		6,529	97.49		
Invalid/blank votes	177	2.64		168	2.51		
Total votes	6,706	100.00		6,697	100.00		
Registered voters/turnout	12,220	54.88		12,220	54.80		

== March 2006 election ==
The following table shows the results of the 2006 election.

Party	Ward			List			Total seats
Party	Votes	%	Seats	Votes	%	Seats	Total seats
African National Congress	3,949	59.63	3	3,970	60.00	1	4
Inkatha Freedom Party	1,828	27.60	1	1,745	26.37	1	2
Democratic Alliance	845	12.76	0	902	13.63	1	1
Total	6,622	100.00	4	6,617	100.00	3	7
Valid votes	6,622	98.37		6,617	98.15		
Invalid/blank votes	110	1.63		125	1.85		
Total votes	6,732	100.00		6,742	100.00		
Registered voters/turnout	13,869	48.54		13,869	48.61		

== May 2011 election ==
The following table shows the results of the 2011 election.

Party	Ward			List			Total seats
Party	Votes	%	Seats	Votes	%	Seats	Total seats
African National Congress	6,602	69.39	4	6,721	70.52	1	5
Democratic Alliance	1,243	13.06	0	1,182	12.40	1	1
Inkatha Freedom Party	1,113	11.70	0	1,141	11.97	1	1
National Freedom Party	522	5.49	0	455	4.77	0	0
African Christian Democratic Party	35	0.37	0	31	0.33	0	0
Total	9,515	100.00	4	9,530	100.00	3	7
Valid votes	9,515	98.86		9,530	99.02		
Invalid/blank votes	110	1.14		94	0.98		
Total votes	9,625	100.00		9,624	100.00		
Registered voters/turnout	15,870	60.65		15,870	60.64		

== August 2016 election ==
The following table shows the results of the 2016 election.

Party	Ward			List			Total seats
Party	Votes	%	Seats	Votes	%	Seats	Total seats
African National Congress	7,427	73.12	5	7,471	73.60	2	7
Democratic Alliance	1,414	13.92	0	1,408	13.87	1	1
Inkatha Freedom Party	1,064	10.48	0	1,022	10.07	1	1
Economic Freedom Fighters	252	2.48	0	250	2.46	0	0
Total	10,157	100.00	5	10,151	100.00	4	9
Valid votes	10,157	98.88		10,151	98.95		
Invalid/blank votes	115	1.12		108	1.05		
Total votes	10,272	100.00		10,259	100.00		
Registered voters/turnout	16,140	63.64		16,140	63.56		

== November 2021 election ==
The following table shows the results of the 2021 election.

Party	Ward			List			Total seats
Party	Votes	%	Seats	Votes	%	Seats	Total seats
African National Congress	5,251	64.04	5	5,500	67.39	2	7
Democratic Alliance	1,078	13.15	0	1,065	13.05	1	1
Economic Freedom Fighters	664	8.10	0	816	10.00	1	1
Inkatha Freedom Party	423	5.16	0	477	5.84	1	1
Independent candidates	487	5.94	0				0
Abantu Batho Congress	173	2.11	0	177	2.17	0	0
African Christian Democratic Party	60	0.73	0	65	0.80	0	0
African Mantungwa Community	49	0.60	0	62	0.76	0	0
National Freedom Party	14	0.17	0				0
Total	8,199	100.00	5	8,162	100.00	5	10
Valid votes	8,199	98.44		8,162	97.95		
Invalid/blank votes	130	1.56		171	2.05		
Total votes	8,329	100.00		8,333	100.00		
Registered voters/turnout	16,768	49.67		16,768	49.70		

=== By-elections from November 2021 ===
The following by-elections were held to fill vacant ward seats in the period since the election in November 2021.

Date	Ward	Party of the previous councillor	Party of the newly elected councillor
11 Sep 2024	4	African National Congress	African National Congress
14 May 2025	4	African National Congress	African National Congress

== November 2026 election ==
The following table shows the results of the 2026 election.

Party	Ward			List			Total seats
Party	Votes	%	Seats	Votes	%	Seats	Total seats
uMkhonto weSizwe Party	3,418	32.28	3	3,571	33.65	1	4
African National Congress	3,180	30.04	0	3,119	29.39	3	3
Democratic Alliance	1,860	17.57	2	1,902	17.92	0	2
Inkatha Freedom Party	932	8.80	1	936	8.82	0	1
Independent Councillors	850	8.03	0	774	7.29	1	1
Economic Freedom Fighters	202	1.91	0	186	1.75	0	0
South African Communist Party	60	0.57	0	54	0.51	0	0
Afrika Mayibuye Movement	43	0.41	0	38	0.36	0	0
African Transformation Movement	36	0.34	0	31	0.29	0	0
Independent candidates	6	0.06	0				0
Total	10,587	100.00	6	10,611	100.00	5	11
Valid votes	10,587	97.46		10,611	97.90		
Invalid/blank votes	276	2.54		228	2.10		
Total votes	10,863	100.00		10,839	100.00		
Registered voters/turnout	18,653	58.24		18,653	58.11		
