= Msunduzi Local Municipality elections =

Local elections in KwaZulu-Natal, South Africa

The Msunduzi Local Municipality council consists of eighty-one members elected by mixed-member proportional representation. Forty-one councillors are elected by first-past-the-post voting in forty-one wards, while the remaining forty are chosen from party lists so that the total number of party representatives is proportional to the number of votes received.

In the election of 4 November 2026, no party won a majority. The uMkhonto weSizwe Party won the largest number of seats on the council, with 31.

== Results ==
The following table shows the composition of the council after past elections.

Event	ACDP	AIC	ANC	DA	EFF	IFP	MF	NFP	MKP	Other	Total
2000 election	1	—	41	17	—	13	1	—	—	0	73
2006 election	1	—	48	12	—	11	1	—	—	0	73
2011 election	0	—	49	15	—	4	1	4	—	0	73
2016 election	1	1	52	15	3	5	0	—	—	1	78
2021 election	1	1	40	16	10	8	0	0	—	5	81
2026 election	0	0	17	17	1	7	0	0	31	8	81

== December 2000 election ==
The following table shows the results of the 2000 election.

Party	Ward			List			Total seats
Party	Votes	%	Seats	Votes	%	Seats	Total seats
African National Congress	58,565	56.54	23	58,605	56.47	18	41
Democratic Alliance	24,425	23.58	9	24,674	23.77	8	17
Inkatha Freedom Party	18,431	17.79	5	18,134	17.47	8	13
Minority Front	1,087	1.05	0	917	0.88	1	1
African Christian Democratic Party	268	0.26	0	1,457	1.40	1	1
Independent candidates	801	0.77	0				0
Total	103,577	100.00	37	103,787	100.00	36	73
Valid votes	103,577	97.93		103,787	98.21		
Invalid/blank votes	2,194	2.07		1,897	1.79		
Total votes	105,771	100.00		105,684	100.00		
Registered voters/turnout	220,082	48.06		220,082	48.02		

== March 2006 election ==
The following table shows the results of the 2006 election.

Party	Ward			List			Total seats
Party	Votes	%	Seats	Votes	%	Seats	Total seats
African National Congress	68,863	62.92	26	72,548	66.32	22	48
Democratic Alliance	17,048	15.58	6	16,948	15.49	6	12
Inkatha Freedom Party	15,236	13.92	5	16,003	14.63	6	11
Independent candidates	4,784	4.37	0				0
African Christian Democratic Party	1,497	1.37	0	1,770	1.62	1	1
Minority Front	1,189	1.09	0	1,273	1.16	1	1
National Democratic Convention	747	0.68	0	851	0.78	0	0
Pan Africanist Congress of Azania	89	0.08	0				0
Total	109,453	100.00	37	109,393	100.00	36	73
Valid votes	109,453	97.92		109,393	98.22		
Invalid/blank votes	2,329	2.08		1,980	1.78		
Total votes	111,782	100.00		111,373	100.00		
Registered voters/turnout	233,512	47.87		233,512	47.69		

== May 2011 election ==
The following table shows the results of the 2011 election.

Party	Ward			List			Total seats
Party	Votes	%	Seats	Votes	%	Seats	Total seats
African National Congress	107,441	62.39	28	116,571	68.35	21	49
Democratic Alliance	32,481	18.86	9	33,244	19.49	6	15
National Freedom Party	8,690	5.05	0	8,884	5.21	4	4
Inkatha Freedom Party	7,952	4.62	0	8,144	4.78	4	4
Independent candidates	12,160	7.06	0				0
Minority Front	1,221	0.71	0	1,212	0.71	1	1
African Christian Democratic Party	992	0.58	0	1,245	0.73	0	0
Azanian People's Organisation	523	0.30	0	590	0.35	0	0
Congress of the People	461	0.27	0	484	0.28	0	0
National Democratic Convention	296	0.17	0	171	0.10	0	0
Total	172,217	100.00	37	170,545	100.00	36	73
Valid votes	172,217	98.06		170,545	97.67		
Invalid/blank votes	3,409	1.94		4,073	2.33		
Total votes	175,626	100.00		174,618	100.00		
Registered voters/turnout	282,708	62.12		282,708	61.77		

== August 2016 election ==
The following table shows the results of the 2016 election.

Party	Ward			List			Total seats
Party	Votes	%	Seats	Votes	%	Seats	Total seats
African National Congress	147,297	66.00	30	146,938	66.18	22	52
Democratic Alliance	42,732	19.15	9	42,865	19.30	6	15
Inkatha Freedom Party	14,886	6.67	0	14,712	6.63	5	5
Economic Freedom Fighters	9,344	4.19	0	8,927	4.02	3	3
African Independent Congress	1,582	0.71	0	4,848	2.18	1	1
Independent candidates	4,034	1.81	0				0
African Christian Democratic Party	913	0.41	0	946	0.43	1	1
Al Jama-ah	908	0.41	0	653	0.29	1	1
African People's Convention	457	0.20	0	773	0.35	0	0
Minority Front	623	0.28	0	585	0.26	0	0
Peoples Alliance	146	0.07	0	266	0.12	0	0
Congress of the People	126	0.06	0	277	0.12	0	0
Azanian People's Organisation	117	0.05	0	254	0.11	0	0
Total	223,165	100.00	39	222,044	100.00	39	78
Valid votes	223,165	98.07		222,044	98.02		
Invalid/blank votes	4,399	1.93		4,474	1.98		
Total votes	227,564	100.00		226,518	100.00		
Registered voters/turnout	340,998	66.73		340,998	66.43		

== November 2021 election ==
The following table shows the results of the 2021 election.

Party	Ward			List			Total seats
Party	Votes	%	Seats	Votes	%	Seats	Total seats
African National Congress	74,238	47.16	29	77,703	49.48	11	40
Democratic Alliance	30,074	19.10	10	30,697	19.55	6	16
Economic Freedom Fighters	18,262	11.60	0	18,673	11.89	10	10
Inkatha Freedom Party	13,271	8.43	1	15,270	9.72	7	8
Independent candidates	7,716	4.90	1				1
Abantu Batho Congress	2,914	1.85	0	2,614	1.66	2	2
African Independent Congress	1,793	1.14	0	1,728	1.10	1	1
Patriotic Alliance	1,537	0.98	0	1,454	0.93	1	1
African Christian Democratic Party	1,006	0.64	0	1,159	0.74	1	1
Justice and Employment Party	803	0.51	0	1,111	0.71	1	1
National Freedom Party	869	0.55	0	777	0.49	0	0
Devoted Citizens of Msunduzi	579	0.37	0	933	0.59	0	0
African Transformation Movement	533	0.34	0	738	0.47	0	0
Al Jama-ah	502	0.32	0	435	0.28	0	0
Pan Africanist Congress of Azania	459	0.29	0	461	0.29	0	0
United Independent Movement	447	0.28	0	462	0.29	0	0
Freedom Front Plus	354	0.22	0	449	0.29	0	0
Minority Front	367	0.23	0	376	0.24	0	0
Azanian People's Organisation	346	0.22	0	314	0.20	0	0
KZN Independence	202	0.13	0	425	0.27	0	0
African People's Convention	311	0.20	0	159	0.10	0	0
Black First Land First	126	0.08	0	205	0.13	0	0
Spectrum National Party	154	0.10	0	160	0.10	0	0
African Mantungwa Community	129	0.08	0	163	0.10	0	0
United Democratic Movement	16	0.01	0	256	0.16	0	0
African People's Movement	178	0.11	0	92	0.06	0	0
African People First	110	0.07	0	139	0.09	0	0
People's Revolutionary Movement	132	0.08	0	84	0.05	0	0
Total	157,428	100.00	41	157,037	100.00	40	81
Valid votes	157,428	97.78		157,037	97.10		
Invalid/blank votes	3,570	2.22		4,697	2.90		
Total votes	160,998	100.00		161,734	100.00		
Registered voters/turnout	339,257	47.46		339,257	47.67		

=== By-elections from November 2021 ===
The following by-elections were held to fill vacant ward seats in the period since the election in November 2021.

Date	Ward	Party of the previous councillor	Party of the newly elected councillor
18 January 2023	28	Democratic Alliance	Democratic Alliance
8 March 2023	2	African National Congress	Inkatha Freedom Party
8 March 2023	25	Democratic Alliance	Democratic Alliance
22 November 2023	41	African National Congress	African National Congress
18 Dec 2024	2	Inkatha Freedom Party	African National Congress

In ward 28, a safe Democratic Alliance (DA) seat, the DA councillor, Lucky Naicker, had his membership of the party terminated for sexual harassment. In the resulting by-election, Naicker stood as an independent, but the new DA candidate retained the seat for the party, winning 62% of the ward votes.

The by-election in ward 2 on 8 March 2023, held after the death of the ANC councillor, saw a large swing to the Inkatha Freedom Party (IFP). After the 2021 election, the ANC retained control of the council with the support of the African Independent Congress. With the loss of a further seat, it will now need to rely on the Patriotic Alliance as well to retain control. In the ward 25 by-election on the same day, held after the councillor took up a vacancy in parliament, the DA retained the seat.

== November 2026 election ==
The following table shows the results of the 2026 election.

Party	Ward			List			Total seats
Party	Votes	%	Seats	Votes	%	Seats	Total seats
uMkhonto weSizwe Party	77,305	38.13	23	79,438	39.13	8	31
Democratic Alliance	41,164	20.30	11	43,283	21.32	6	17
African National Congress	41,950	20.69	1	40,903	20.15	16	17
Inkatha Freedom Party	16,270	8.02	2	16,203	7.98	5	7
Independent Councillors	7,307	3.60	3	6,865	3.38	0	3
ActionSA	2,180	1.08	0	3,029	1.49	1	1
Economic Freedom Fighters	2,349	1.16	0	2,448	1.21	1	1
Independent candidates	3,019	1.49	1				1
South African Communist Party	1,366	0.67	0	1,206	0.59	1	1
Freedom Front Plus	1,139	0.56	0	1,292	0.64	1	1
Afrika Mayibuye Movement	915	0.45	0	868	0.43	1	1
African Independent Congress	920	0.45	0	632	0.31	0	0
Patriotic Alliance	830	0.41	0	644	0.32	0	0
African Christian Democratic Party	526	0.26	0	937	0.46	0	0
African Transformation Movement	634	0.31	0	825	0.41	0	0
Abantu Bezwelethu Congress Democracy	627	0.31	0	408	0.20	0	0
Truth and Solidarity Movement	549	0.27	0	430	0.21	0	0
Al Jama-ah	393	0.19	0	436	0.21	0	0
KZN Independence	436	0.22	0	268	0.13	0	0
Minority Front	343	0.17	0	313	0.15	0	0
National Freedom Party	351	0.17	0	263	0.13	0	0
Activists Movement of South Africa	263	0.13	0	222	0.11	0	0
African Movement Congress	217	0.11	0	244	0.12	0	0
Justice and Employment Party	224	0.11	0	225	0.11	0	0
Bumbana Mzansi	186	0.09	0	249	0.12	0	0
Abantu Batho Congress	126	0.06	0	292	0.14	0	0
Next Generation Government	186	0.09	0	231	0.11	0	0
African Renaissance Unity	148	0.07	0	240	0.12	0	0
Active Citizens Coalition	162	0.08	0	142	0.07	0	0
African People's Movement	144	0.07	0	143	0.07	0	0
Pan Africanist Congress of Azania	121	0.06	0	111	0.05	0	0
Afro Natives	112	0.06	0	95	0.05	0	0
Azanian People's Organisation	115	0.06	0	16	0.01	0	0
Organic Humanity Movement	75	0.04	0	32	0.02	0	0
South Africa First	18	0.01	0	51	0.03	0	0
Unity Mzanse	55	0.03	0				0
Afrika Unite Congress	20	0.01	0	34	0.02	0	0
Total	202,745	100.00	41	203,018	100.00	40	81
Valid votes	202,745	98.42		203,018	98.66		
Invalid/blank votes	3,261	1.58		2,753	1.34		
Total votes	206,006	100.00		205,771	100.00		
Registered voters/turnout	366,266	56.24		366,266	56.18		
