= Impendle Local Municipality elections =

Local elections in KwaZulu-Natal, South Africa

The Impendle Local Municipality council consists of eleven members elected by mixed-member proportional representation. Six councillors are elected by first-past-the-post voting in six wards, while the remaining five are chosen from party lists so that the total number of party representatives is proportional to the number of votes received.

In the election of 4 November 2026 the uMkhonto weSizwe Party (MKP) won a majority of six seats on the council.

== Results ==
The following table shows the composition of the council after past elections.

Event	ANC	DA	EFF	IFP	MKP	Other	Total
2000 election	4	1	—	2	—	0	7
2006 election	5	0	—	2	—	—	7
2011 election	6	0	—	1	—	0	7
2016 election	6	0	0	1	—	0	7
2021 election	6	0	2	2	—	0	10
2026 election	2	1	0	1	6	1	11

== December 2000 election ==
The following table shows the results of the 2000 election.

Party	Ward			List			Total seats
Party	Votes	%	Seats	Votes	%	Seats	Total seats
African National Congress	2,756	53.55	4	2,770	53.95	0	4
Inkatha Freedom Party	1,791	34.80	0	1,808	35.22	2	2
Democratic Alliance	308	5.98	0	556	10.83	1	1
Independent candidates	292	5.67	0				0
Total	5,147	100.00	4	5,134	100.00	3	7
Valid votes	5,147	96.15		5,134	95.98		
Invalid/blank votes	206	3.85		215	4.02		
Total votes	5,353	100.00		5,349	100.00		
Registered voters/turnout	11,883	45.05		11,883	45.01		

== March 2006 election ==
The following table shows the results of the 2006 election.

Party	Ward			List			Total seats
Party	Votes	%	Seats	Votes	%	Seats	Total seats
African National Congress	3,844	69.65	4	3,816	69.09	1	5
Inkatha Freedom Party	1,297	23.50	0	1,297	23.48	2	2
Democratic Alliance	378	6.85	0	410	7.42	0	0
Total	5,519	100.00	4	5,523	100.00	3	7
Valid votes	5,519	97.08		5,523	97.20		
Invalid/blank votes	166	2.92		159	2.80		
Total votes	5,685	100.00		5,682	100.00		
Registered voters/turnout	12,626	45.03		12,626	45.00		

== May 2011 election ==
The following table shows the results of the 2011 election.

Party	Ward			List			Total seats
Party	Votes	%	Seats	Votes	%	Seats	Total seats
African National Congress	7,948	84.34	4	8,247	86.46	2	6
Inkatha Freedom Party	538	5.71	0	561	5.88	1	1
National Freedom Party	454	4.82	0	419	4.39	0	0
Democratic Alliance	433	4.59	0	256	2.68	0	0
African Christian Democratic Party	51	0.54	0	56	0.59	0	0
Total	9,424	100.00	4	9,539	100.00	3	7
Valid votes	9,424	97.38		9,539	98.35		
Invalid/blank votes	254	2.62		160	1.65		
Total votes	9,678	100.00		9,699	100.00		
Registered voters/turnout	15,718	61.57		15,718	61.71		

== August 2016 election ==
The following table shows the results of the 2016 election.

Party	Ward			List			Total seats
Party	Votes	%	Seats	Votes	%	Seats	Total seats
African National Congress	10,283	89.59	4	10,165	89.21	2	6
Inkatha Freedom Party	572	4.98	0	574	5.04	1	1
Democratic Alliance	282	2.46	0	255	2.24	0	0
Economic Freedom Fighters	259	2.26	0	246	2.16	0	0
African People's Convention	58	0.51	0	110	0.97	0	0
Congress of the People	24	0.21	0	44	0.39	0	0
Total	11,478	100.00	4	11,394	100.00	3	7
Valid votes	11,478	98.28		11,394	98.27		
Invalid/blank votes	201	1.72		200	1.73		
Total votes	11,679	100.00		11,594	100.00		
Registered voters/turnout	17,015	68.64		17,015	68.14		

== November 2021 election ==
The following table shows the results of the 2021 election.

Party	Ward			List			Total seats
Party	Votes	%	Seats	Votes	%	Seats	Total seats
African National Congress	5,478	57.75	5	5,551	58.85	1	6
Inkatha Freedom Party	1,522	16.04	0	1,658	17.58	2	2
Economic Freedom Fighters	1,517	15.99	0	1,648	17.47	2	2
Democratic Alliance	228	2.40	0	240	2.54	0	0
Independent candidates	451	4.75	0				0
African Transformation Movement	90	0.95	0	103	1.09	0	0
National Freedom Party	74	0.78	0	84	0.89	0	0
Abantu Batho Congress	62	0.65	0	58	0.61	0	0
African Mantungwa Community	24	0.25	0	43	0.46	0	0
African Christian Democratic Party	23	0.24	0	27	0.29	0	0
People's Freedom Party	17	0.18	0	20	0.21	0	0
Total	9,486	100.00	5	9,432	100.00	5	10
Valid votes	9,486	97.80		9,432	97.30		
Invalid/blank votes	213	2.20		262	2.70		
Total votes	9,699	100.00		9,694	100.00		
Registered voters/turnout	17,299	56.07		17,299	56.04		

== November 2026 election ==
The following table shows the results of the 2026 election.

Party	Ward			List			Total seats
Party	Votes	%	Seats	Votes	%	Seats	Total seats
uMkhonto weSizwe Party	4,421	42.38	6	4,468	42.84	0	6
African National Congress	2,751	26.37	0	2,750	26.37	2	2
Democratic Alliance	1,240	11.89	0	1,282	12.29	1	1
Inkatha Freedom Party	876	8.40	0	872	8.36	1	1
Independent Councillors	771	7.39	0	704	6.75	1	1
Economic Freedom Fighters	166	1.59	0	169	1.62	0	0
People's Freedom Party	55	0.53	0	51	0.49	0	0
Afrika Mayibuye Movement	55	0.53	0	48	0.46	0	0
African Transformation Movement	45	0.43	0	53	0.51	0	0
South African Communist Party	24	0.23	0	13	0.12	0	0
Organic Humanity Movement	19	0.18	0	8	0.08	0	0
Bumbana Mzansi	9	0.09	0	12	0.12	0	0
Total	10,432	100.00	6	10,430	100.00	5	11
Valid votes	10,432	98.95		10,430	99.11		
Invalid/blank votes	111	1.05		94	0.89		
Total votes	10,543	100.00		10,524	100.00		
Registered voters/turnout	18,597	56.69		18,597	56.59		
