= Nquthu Local Municipality elections =

Local elections in KwaZulu-Natal, South Africa

The Nquthu Local Municipality council comprises thirty-nine members elected by mixed-member proportional representation. Twenty councillors are elected by first-past-the-post voting in twenty wards, while the remaining nineteen are chosen from party lists so that the total number of party representatives is proportional to the number of votes received.

In the election of 4 November 2026, the Inkatha Freedom Party lost its majority, but remains the largest party in the council, with 17 seats.

== Results ==
The following table shows the composition of the council after past elections.

| Event | ANC | DA | EFF | IFP | NFP | MKP | Other | Total |
|---|---|---|---|---|---|---|---|---|
| 2000 election | 4 | 1 | — | 20 | — | — | 0 | 25 |
| 2006 election | 6 | 1 | — | 22 | — | — | 1 | 30 |
| 2011 election | 14 | 1 | — | 14 | 5 | — | 0 | 34 |
| 2016 election | 14 | 1 | 1 | 15 | 2 | — | 0 | 33 |
| 2017 special election | 11 | 1 | 1 | 19 | 1 | — | 0 | 33 |
| 2021 election | 14 | 0 | 1 | 19 | 0 | — | 3 | 37 |
| 2026 election | 8 | 1 | 0 | 17 | 0 | 11 | 2 | 39 |

== December 2000 election ==
The following table shows the results of the 2000 election.

| Party | Ward | | | List | | | Total seats |
| Party | Votes | % | Seats | Votes | % | Seats | Total seats |
|---|---|---|---|---|---|---|---|
| Inkatha Freedom Party | 17,921 | 78.00 | 13 | 18,769 | 81.70 | 7 | 20 |
| African National Congress | 3,151 | 13.71 | 0 | 3,307 | 14.40 | 4 | 4 |
| Democratic Alliance | 628 | 2.73 | 0 | 897 | 3.90 | 1 | 1 |
| Independent candidates | 1,277 | 5.56 | 0 | | | | 0 |
| Total | 22,977 | 100.00 | 13 | 22,973 | 100.00 | 12 | 25 |
| Valid votes | 22,977 | 97.59 | | 22,973 | 97.67 | | |
| Invalid/blank votes | 567 | 2.41 | | 549 | 2.33 | | |
| Total votes | 23,544 | 100.00 | | 23,522 | 100.00 | | |
| Registered voters/turnout | 45,302 | 51.97 | | 45,302 | 51.92 | | |

== March 2006 election ==
The following table shows the results of the 2006 election.

| Party | Ward | | | List | | | Total seats |
| Party | Votes | % | Seats | Votes | % | Seats | Total seats |
|---|---|---|---|---|---|---|---|
| Inkatha Freedom Party | 23,660 | 74.53 | 14 | 23,429 | 73.81 | 8 | 22 |
| African National Congress | 5,908 | 18.61 | 1 | 6,026 | 18.98 | 5 | 6 |
| National Democratic Convention | 1,136 | 3.58 | 0 | 1,169 | 3.68 | 1 | 1 |
| Democratic Alliance | 1,043 | 3.29 | 0 | 1,118 | 3.52 | 1 | 1 |
| Total | 31,747 | 100.00 | 15 | 31,742 | 100.00 | 15 | 30 |
| Valid votes | 31,747 | 97.91 | | 31,742 | 97.84 | | |
| Invalid/blank votes | 679 | 2.09 | | 702 | 2.16 | | |
| Total votes | 32,426 | 100.00 | | 32,444 | 100.00 | | |
| Registered voters/turnout | 58,210 | 55.71 | | 58,210 | 55.74 | | |

== May 2011 election ==
The following table shows the results of the 2011 election.

| Party | Ward | | | List | | | Total seats |
| Party | Votes | % | Seats | Votes | % | Seats | Total seats |
|---|---|---|---|---|---|---|---|
| African National Congress | 15,648 | 39.50 | 7 | 16,374 | 41.21 | 7 | 14 |
| Inkatha Freedom Party | 15,910 | 40.16 | 8 | 15,886 | 39.99 | 6 | 14 |
| National Freedom Party | 6,513 | 16.44 | 2 | 6,372 | 16.04 | 3 | 5 |
| Democratic Alliance | 706 | 1.78 | 0 | 620 | 1.56 | 1 | 1 |
| Independent candidates | 486 | 1.23 | 0 | | | | 0 |
| African Christian Democratic Party | 206 | 0.52 | 0 | 175 | 0.44 | 0 | 0 |
| Royal Loyal Progress | 80 | 0.20 | 0 | 185 | 0.47 | 0 | 0 |
| Federal Congress | 65 | 0.16 | 0 | 117 | 0.29 | 0 | 0 |
| Total | 39,614 | 100.00 | 17 | 39,729 | 100.00 | 17 | 34 |
| Valid votes | 39,614 | 98.36 | | 39,729 | 98.14 | | |
| Invalid/blank votes | 662 | 1.64 | | 754 | 1.86 | | |
| Total votes | 40,276 | 100.00 | | 40,483 | 100.00 | | |
| Registered voters/turnout | 65,776 | 61.23 | | 65,776 | 61.55 | | |

== August 2016 election ==
The following table shows the results of the 2016 election.

| Party | Ward | | | List | | | Total seats |
| Party | Votes | % | Seats | Votes | % | Seats | Total seats |
|---|---|---|---|---|---|---|---|
| Inkatha Freedom Party | 19,099 | 43.60 | 10 | 19,554 | 44.59 | 5 | 15 |
| African National Congress | 17,821 | 40.68 | 7 | 19,018 | 43.37 | 7 | 14 |
| National Freedom Party | 2,203 | 5.03 | 0 | 3,021 | 6.89 | 2 | 2 |
| Economic Freedom Fighters | 1,321 | 3.02 | 0 | 1,313 | 2.99 | 1 | 1 |
| Independent candidates | 2,479 | 5.66 | 0 | | | | 0 |
| Democratic Alliance | 884 | 2.02 | 0 | 948 | 2.16 | 1 | 1 |
| Total | 43,807 | 100.00 | 17 | 43,854 | 100.00 | 16 | 33 |
| Valid votes | 43,807 | 98.04 | | 43,854 | 97.93 | | |
| Invalid/blank votes | 878 | 1.96 | | 929 | 2.07 | | |
| Total votes | 44,685 | 100.00 | | 44,783 | 100.00 | | |
| Registered voters/turnout | 77,097 | 57.96 | | 77,097 | 58.09 | | |

=== February 2017 special election ===
By February 2017, the Nquthu Local Municipality had failed to form a council and appoint a mayor. The KwaZulu-Natal Cooperative Governance and Traditional Affairs MEC Nomusa Dube-Ncube dissolved the then elected members' positions on 9 February 2017, effective from 23 February with elections to be held on 25 May 2017. A coalition of Inkatha Freedom Party (IFP), Democratic Alliance (DA) and Economic Freedom Fighters (EFF) held the majority control by one seat over the ANC's coalition of seventeen seats. The DA and IFP blamed the ANC for the lack of progress. The DA would welcome the MEC's decision, but the IFP was unhappy about it.

In the special election held on 25 May 2017, the IFP won a majority of 58% of the vote and 19 seats on the council. The following table shows the results of the election.

| Party | Votes | | | | Seats | | |
| Party | Ward | List | Total | % | Ward | List | Total |
|---|---|---|---|---|---|---|---|
| Inkatha Freedom Party | 27,768 | 28,086 | 55,854 | 58.0 | 14 | 5 | 19 |
| African National Congress | 15,751 | 15,735 | 31,486 | 32.7 | 3 | 8 | 11 |
| Economic Freedom Fighters | 1,354 | 1,272 | 2,626 | 2.7 | 0 | 1 | 1 |
| National Freedom Party | 1,075 | 1,039 | 2,114 | 2.2 | 0 | 1 | 1 |
| DA | 586 | 579 | 1,165 | 1.2 | 0 | 1 | 1 |
| AIC | 489 | 414 | 903 | 0.9 | 0 | 0 | 0 |
| Forum 4 Service Delivery | 311 | 268 | 579 | 0.6 | 0 | 0 | 0 |
| APC | 161 | 172 | 333 | 0.3 | 0 | 0 | 0 |
| Black First Land First | 144 | 114 | 258 | 0.3 | 0 | 0 | 0 |
| National Religious Freedom Party | 131 | 122 | 253 | 0.3 | 0 | 0 | 0 |
| Academic Congress Union | 98 | 100 | 198 | 0.2 | 0 | 0 | 0 |
| National Peoples Ambassadors | 109 | 82 | 191 | 0.2 | 0 | 0 | 0 |
| National Democratic Convention | 88 | 57 | 145 | 0.2 | 0 | 0 | 0 |
| African Mantungwa Community | 69 | 51 | 120 | 0.1 | 0 | 0 | 0 |
| Total | 48,134 | 48,091 | 96,225 | 100.0 | 17 | 16 | 33 |
| Spoilt votes | 610 | 633 | 1,243 | | | | |

== November 2021 election ==
The following table shows the results of the 2021 election.

| Party | Ward | | | List | | | Total seats |
| Party | Votes | % | Seats | Votes | % | Seats | Total seats |
|---|---|---|---|---|---|---|---|
| Inkatha Freedom Party | 20,789 | 49.25 | 14 | 21,665 | 51.03 | 5 | 19 |
| African National Congress | 15,222 | 36.06 | 5 | 15,385 | 36.23 | 9 | 14 |
| Abantu Batho Congress | 3,030 | 7.18 | 0 | 2,955 | 6.96 | 3 | 3 |
| Economic Freedom Fighters | 741 | 1.76 | 0 | 779 | 1.83 | 1 | 1 |
| Independent candidates | 704 | 1.67 | 0 | | | | 0 |
| Democratic Alliance | 355 | 0.84 | 0 | 342 | 0.81 | 0 | 0 |
| National Freedom Party | 298 | 0.71 | 0 | 312 | 0.73 | 0 | 0 |
| Future Generation Congress | 223 | 0.53 | 0 | 190 | 0.45 | 0 | 0 |
| African Christian Democratic Party | 169 | 0.40 | 0 | 195 | 0.46 | 0 | 0 |
| National Peoples Ambassadors | 126 | 0.30 | 0 | 140 | 0.33 | 0 | 0 |
| African Transformation Movement | 135 | 0.32 | 0 | 103 | 0.24 | 0 | 0 |
| African People's Movement | 115 | 0.27 | 0 | 108 | 0.25 | 0 | 0 |
| People's Freedom Party | 112 | 0.27 | 0 | 87 | 0.20 | 0 | 0 |
| Forum for Service Delivery | 77 | 0.18 | 0 | 79 | 0.19 | 0 | 0 |
| African Mantungwa Community | 73 | 0.17 | 0 | 68 | 0.16 | 0 | 0 |
| United Christian Democratic Party | 42 | 0.10 | 0 | 51 | 0.12 | 0 | 0 |
| Total | 42,211 | 100.00 | 19 | 42,459 | 100.00 | 18 | 37 |
| Valid votes | 42,211 | 98.61 | | 42,459 | 98.52 | | |
| Invalid/blank votes | 593 | 1.39 | | 637 | 1.48 | | |
| Total votes | 42,804 | 100.00 | | 43,096 | 100.00 | | |
| Registered voters/turnout | 80,324 | 53.29 | | 80,324 | 53.65 | | |

== November 2026 election ==
The following table shows the results of the 2026 election.

| Party | Ward | | | List | | | Total seats |
| Party | Votes | % | Seats | Votes | % | Seats | Total seats |
|---|---|---|---|---|---|---|---|
| Inkatha Freedom Party | 18,437 | 42.09 | 14 | 18,419 | 42.04 | 3 | 17 |
| uMkhonto weSizwe Party | 12,256 | 27.98 | 4 | 12,706 | 29.00 | 7 | 11 |
| African National Congress | 9,421 | 21.51 | 2 | 9,150 | 20.88 | 6 | 8 |
| Abantu Bezwelethu Congress Democracy | 1,282 | 2.93 | 0 | 1,165 | 2.66 | 1 | 1 |
| South African Communist Party | 839 | 1.92 | 0 | 818 | 1.87 | 1 | 1 |
| Democratic Alliance | 441 | 1.01 | 0 | 521 | 1.19 | 1 | 1 |
| Economic Freedom Fighters | 325 | 0.74 | 0 | 310 | 0.71 | 0 | 0 |
| National Freedom Party | 90 | 0.21 | 0 | 207 | 0.47 | 0 | 0 |
| Gap Fixers of South Africa | 72 | 0.16 | 0 | 171 | 0.39 | 0 | 0 |
| Independent candidates | 202 | 0.46 | 0 | | | | 0 |
| Afrika Mayibuye Movement | 99 | 0.23 | 0 | 85 | 0.19 | 0 | 0 |
| Service Delivery Party | 122 | 0.28 | 0 | 57 | 0.13 | 0 | 0 |
| Ekhethu Peoples Party | 87 | 0.20 | 0 | 54 | 0.12 | 0 | 0 |
| African Transformation Movement | 46 | 0.11 | 0 | 80 | 0.18 | 0 | 0 |
| African Economic Freedom | 50 | 0.11 | 0 | 59 | 0.13 | 0 | 0 |
| Freedom in South Africa | 29 | 0.07 | 0 | 16 | 0.04 | 0 | 0 |
| African Renaissance Unity | 10 | 0.02 | 0 | | | | 0 |
| Total | 43,808 | 100.00 | 20 | 43,818 | 100.00 | 19 | 39 |
| Valid votes | 43,808 | 98.46 | | 43,818 | 98.60 | | |
| Invalid/blank votes | 687 | 1.54 | | 622 | 1.40 | | |
| Total votes | 44,495 | 100.00 | | 44,440 | 100.00 | | |
| Registered voters/turnout | 88,443 | 50.31 | | 88,443 | 50.25 | | |
