= Nongoma Local Municipality elections =

Local elections in KwaZulu-Natal, South Africa

The Nongoma Local Municipality council consists of forty-five members elected by mixed-member proportional representation. Twenty-three councillors are elected by first-past-the-post voting in twenty-three wards, while the remaining twenty-two are chosen from party lists so that the total number of party representatives is proportional to the number of votes received.

In the election of 4 November 2026, the Inkatha Freedom Party (IFP) retained the majority it had won following the by-elections earlier in the year, winning 23 seats.

== Results ==
The following table shows the composition of the council after past elections.

Event	ANC	DA	EFF	IFP	NFP	MKP	Other	Total
2000 election	1	0	—	37	—	—	—	38
2006 election	2	1	—	35	—	—	0	38
2011 election	6	0	—	17	19	—	0	42
2016 election	13	5	2	22	—	—	0	42
2021 election	8	0	2	21	13	—	1	45
2026 election	5	0	1	23	5	9	2	45

== December 2000 election ==
The following table shows the results of the 2000 election.

Party	Ward			List			Total seats
Party	Votes	%	Seats	Votes	%	Seats	Total seats
Inkatha Freedom Party	34,681	96.49	19	34,906	96.94	18	37
African National Congress	788	2.19	0	676	1.88	1	1
Democratic Alliance	475	1.32	0	427	1.19	0	0
Total	35,944	100.00	19	36,009	100.00	19	38
Valid votes	35,944	98.75		36,009	98.82		
Invalid/blank votes	454	1.25		429	1.18		
Total votes	36,398	100.00		36,438	100.00		
Registered voters/turnout	66,538	54.70		66,538	54.76		

== March 2006 election ==
The following table shows the results of the 2006 election.

Party	Ward			List			Total seats
Party	Votes	%	Seats	Votes	%	Seats	Total seats
Inkatha Freedom Party	39,163	93.64	19	38,983	92.93	16	35
African National Congress	1,869	4.47	0	2,254	5.37	2	2
Democratic Alliance	773	1.85	0	460	1.10	1	1
National Democratic Convention	18	0.04	0	252	0.60	0	0
Total	41,823	100.00	19	41,949	100.00	19	38
Valid votes	41,823	98.09		41,949	98.38		
Invalid/blank votes	813	1.91		689	1.62		
Total votes	42,636	100.00		42,638	100.00		
Registered voters/turnout	72,517	58.79		72,517	58.80		

== May 2011 election ==
The following table shows the results of the 2011 election.

Party	Ward			List			Total seats
Party	Votes	%	Seats	Votes	%	Seats	Total seats
National Freedom Party	23,079	44.49	13	22,984	44.14	6	19
Inkatha Freedom Party	21,138	40.75	8	21,277	40.86	9	17
African National Congress	6,807	13.12	0	7,435	14.28	6	6
Independent candidates	675	1.30	0				0
Democratic Alliance	179	0.35	0	380	0.73	0	0
Total	51,878	100.00	21	52,076	100.00	21	42
Valid votes	51,878	98.53		52,076	98.65		
Invalid/blank votes	773	1.47		712	1.35		
Total votes	52,651	100.00		52,788	100.00		
Registered voters/turnout	81,552	64.56		81,552	64.73		

== August 2016 election ==
The following table shows the results of the 2016 election.

Party	Ward			List			Total seats
Party	Votes	%	Seats	Votes	%	Seats	Total seats
Inkatha Freedom Party	29,104	53.19	21	29,073	52.73	1	22
African National Congress	17,020	31.11	0	16,861	30.58	13	13
Democratic Alliance	6,559	11.99	0	7,473	13.55	5	5
Economic Freedom Fighters	1,970	3.60	0	1,725	3.13	2	2
Independent candidates	61	0.11	0				0
Total	54,714	100.00	21	55,132	100.00	21	42
Valid votes	54,714	98.29		55,132	98.88		
Invalid/blank votes	954	1.71		627	1.12		
Total votes	55,668	100.00		55,759	100.00		
Registered voters/turnout	96,207	57.86		96,207	57.96		

== November 2021 election ==
The following table shows the results of the 2021 election.

Party	Ward			List			Total seats
Party	Votes	%	Seats	Votes	%	Seats	Total seats
Inkatha Freedom Party	22,376	45.08	20	23,568	47.12	1	21
National Freedom Party	14,557	29.33	3	14,819	29.62	10	13
African National Congress	8,453	17.03	0	8,411	16.81	8	8
Economic Freedom Fighters	1,922	3.87	0	1,885	3.77	2	2
Independent candidates	1,059	2.13	0				0
National People's Front	423	0.85	0	509	1.02	1	1
African Christian Democratic Party	323	0.65	0	326	0.65	0	0
Democratic Alliance	301	0.61	0	306	0.61	0	0
Abantu Batho Congress	133	0.27	0	91	0.18	0	0
African Transformation Movement	51	0.10	0	49	0.10	0	0
African People's Movement	39	0.08	0	58	0.12	0	0
Total	49,637	100.00	23	50,022	100.00	22	45
Valid votes	49,637	98.64		50,022	98.63		
Invalid/blank votes	684	1.36		697	1.37		
Total votes	50,321	100.00		50,719	100.00		
Registered voters/turnout	98,137	51.28		98,137	51.68		

=== By-elections from November 2021 ===
The following by-elections were held to fill vacant ward seats in the period from the election in November 2021.

Date	Ward	Party of the previous councillor	Party of the newly elected councillor
2 Feb 2022	17	National Freedom Party	National Freedom Party
2 Feb 2022	20	Inkatha Freedom Party	National Freedom Party
5 Apr 2023	6	Inkatha Freedom Party	Inkatha Freedom Party
19 Jun 2024	11	Inkatha Freedom Party	Inkatha Freedom Party
25 Feb 2026	17	National Freedom Party	Inkatha Freedom Party
18 Mar 2026	7	National Freedom Party	Inkatha Freedom Party
18 Mar 2026	20	National Freedom Party	Inkatha Freedom Party

The council had been governed by the Inkatha Freedom Party (IFP) with the support of the Economic Freedom Fighters (EFF) since the 2021 election. The IFP lost control after the National Freedom Party's (NFP) win in ward 20 and the withdrawal of EFF support, and an NFP, African National Congress (ANC) and EFF coalition took over the council in February 2023. IFP mayor Albert Mncwango was replaced by the NFP's Clifford Ndabandaba, and IFP Speaker, Prince Bheki Zulu was replaced by the ANC's Babongiwe Sithole.

The IFP gained a majority in the council after claiming three successive seats from the NFP; the first in a by-election on 25 February 2026, followed by a further two wins on 18 March 2026.

== November 2026 election ==
The following table shows the results of the 2026 election.

Party	Ward			List			Total seats
Party	Votes	%	Seats	Votes	%	Seats	Total seats
Inkatha Freedom Party	27,778	50.78	21	28,200	51.72	2	23
uMkhonto weSizwe Party	10,861	19.85	1	10,961	20.10	8	9
African National Congress	6,142	11.23	1	5,957	10.92	4	5
National Freedom Party	5,718	10.45	0	5,542	10.16	5	5
Economic Freedom Fighters	1,181	2.16	0	1,148	2.11	1	1
National People's Front	855	1.56	0	689	1.26	1	1
African Transformation Movement	584	1.07	0	587	1.08	1	1
National Peoples Ambassadors	437	0.80	0	395	0.72	0	0
Democratic Alliance	320	0.58	0	327	0.60	0	0
ActionSA	266	0.49	0	264	0.48	0	0
Inkululeko Yabantu Movement	178	0.33	0	185	0.34	0	0
Gods Justice and Development Party	85	0.16	0	121	0.22	0	0
African Economic Freedom	105	0.19	0	91	0.17	0	0
South African Communist Party	79	0.14	0	62	0.11	0	0
Independent candidates	106	0.19	0				0
African Renaissance Unity	9	0.02	0				0
Total	54,704	100.00	23	54,529	100.00	22	45
Valid votes	54,704	99.00		54,529	98.97		
Invalid/blank votes	552	1.00		566	1.03		
Total votes	55,256	100.00		55,095	100.00		
Registered voters/turnout	110,230	50.13		110,230	49.98		
