= Bhungu Gwala =

South African politician

Bhungu Gwala is a South African politician, and leader of a faction of the Abantu Batho Congress.

== National Freedom Party ==
In 2012, while a councillor for the National Freedom Party, Gwala was accused of murdering Inkatha Freedom Party (IFP) supporter Cebisile Shezi. Previously, IFP councillor Themba Xulu was arrested for attempting to burn down Gwala's house. While out on bail, Xulu was shot and killed. IFP supporters converged on Gwala's home, and Shezi was shot. Following an affidavit in which a security guard claimed that he and Gwala's son, Celimpilo, fired several rounds at the group of IFP supporters. Gwala, two of his sons, and the security guard. were charged with murder. All charges were dismissed against Gwala.

== Abantu Batho Congress ==
In January 2020, Gwala joined the Abantu Batho Congress, stating that he was tired of being asked about court cases rather than growing the party.

In November 2023, a faction elected Gwala as president of the party. Reigning president Philani Mavundla disputed the decision, and both leaders attempted to fire each other from the party. In 2024, the Electoral Court ruled in favour of Mavundla. Gwala has since escalated the matter to the Pietermaritzburg High Court.

== Personal life ==
As of 2012, Gwala had 18 children. One of Gwala's sons, Siphamandla, was murdered in KwaMashu in 2012.
