= Ivan Rowan Barnes =

South African politician

Leader of the National Freedom Party
- Incumbent
- Assumed office 17 December 2023

Personal details
- Party: National Freedom Party

Ivan Barnes is the leader of the National Freedom Party, and its leading candidate on the national list, for the 2024 general election. He was elected president of the party on 17 December 2023, in an election that was disputed by the party's National Executive Committee. His election was later recognised by the Independent Electoral Commission. His stint as party president has been marred by infighting. He struggled not only with the former secretary general Canaan Mdletshe, but also with Teddy Thwala, who was elected secretary-general of the party with him. Barnes later suspended fifteen party leaders, but the decision was suspended by the courts in July 2024.
