= Philani Mavundla =

South African politician and business tycoon

Councillor Philani Mavundla

Mayor of the Umvoti Local Municipality
- Former Mayor of UMvoti Municipality
- In office 21 June 2023 – May 2024
- Preceded by: Gabriel Malembe
- Succeeded by: Gabriel Malembe
- In office 2011–2013

Deputy Mayor of the eThekwini Metropolitan Municipality
- In office 24 November 2021 – 13 December 2022
- Mayor: Mxolisi Kaunda
- Preceded by: Belinda Scott
- Succeeded by: Zandile Myeni

President of the Abantu Batho Congress Founder of the Abantu Batho Congress
- Incumbent
- Assumed office 8 January 2020
- Preceded by: Party established

Personal details
- Born: Philani Godfrey Mavundla; 1966 or 1967 (age 58–59) Clermont, KwaZulu-Natal, South Africa
- Party: Abantu Batho Congress (2020–present); National Freedom Party (2019–2020); African National Congress (Until 2019)
- Spouse(s): Cindy, Tersia and Mpume
- Children: 21
- Profession: Politician, businessman

Philani Godfrey Mavundla is a South African politician and a business man who is a former Mayor of the Umvoti Local Municipality in KwaZulu-Natal, having previously served from 2011 to 2013 as a member of the African National Congress. He served as the Deputy Mayor of the eThekwini Metropolitan Municipality from 2021 until 2022. He is the founder and current leader of the Abantu Batho Congress, a party he founded in early-2020 after he resigned from the National Freedom Party (NFP).

== Early life ==
Mavundla was born in the Clermont township outside Pinetown in Durban. He became an entrepreneur at the age of 12. He sold snacks to his schoolmates. At the age of 16, Mavundla left school to go and work for a tyre manufacturing company in Welkom in the Free State. He later returned to Durban and worked for a multiple construction companies and earned a boilermaker certificate.

== Career ==
In 1994, he and two friends formed a construction company, Maziya Engineering. Two years later, he formed his own construction company, PG Mavundla Engineering. It has been involved with big construction projects in KwaZulu-Natal, Gauteng and in the neighbouring country of Lesotho. Mavundla was involved in the construction of uShaka Marine World in Durban, the Inkosi Albert Luthuli International Convention Centre in Durban, the Sibaya Casino in Durban, and the John Ross Highway Bridge in Richards Bay.

== Political career ==
Mavundla is a close-friend of former ANC president Jacob Zuma and was involved with the Friends of Jacob Zuma Trust, a trust set up by businessman Don Mkhwanazi in 2005 to raise money for Zuma's defence against his fraud and corruption charges at the time. In 2008, he slaughtered 20 cattle to celebrate Zuma's election as ANC president. He attracted controversy in 2008 when he removed a portrait of Inkatha Freedom Party president Mangosuthu Buthelezi from the uMvoti council chamber and placed it in the boot of his car. In 2009, Mavundla burnt a businessman's R2 million truck after it drove over sugar cane at this property in Seven Oaks.

In 2011, he was elected mayor of the uMvoti Local Municipality as a member of the ANC. As mayor, he refused to accept his annual salary of R700,000 and used his personal car for official duties. Mavundla resigned as mayor on 14 June 2013 instead of presenting a budget.

In June 2019, Mavundla resigned from the ANC and joined the National Freedom Party. He stood as the NFP candidate in a by-election in ward 7 in the uMvoti Municipality in August 2019 and won the seat from the ANC in a landslide. He won with 56.69% of the vote. The ANC had won the ward with 82.22% of the vote in 2016. Mavundla was seen as a potential successor to NFP leader Zanele kaMagwaza-Msibi.

Mavundla resigned from the NFP in January 2020 after it was alleged that he would be starting his own political party. He then formed the Abantu Batho Congress soon after. The party contested the 2021 local elections and won seven seats in uMvoti local municipality as the ANC lost their majority. The party also won several seats in other municipalities in KwaZulu-Natal, including two seats in the eThekwini Metropolitan Municipality where the ANC had lost their majority.

Mavundla was then sworn in as a councillor for the ABC in eThekwini. At the inaugural council meeting of the eThekwini municipality on 22 November 2021, it appeared that the ANC was going to lose the mayor and deputy mayor positions to a coalition of opposition parties, including the ABC. The meeting was then postponed to 24 November. At the meeting on 24 November, Mavundla was nominated by the ANC to serve on the executive committee. The ANC's Mxolisi Kaunda was then re-elected as mayor with the help of smaller parties, including the ABC. After Kaunda's re-election, Mavundla was elected deputy mayor.

Mavundla denied that he was "bought" by the ANC, saying that "buying me would be too expensive". An insider within the ABC claimed that Mavundla took the decision to side with the ANC because working with the Democratic Alliance (DA) would have been difficult.

Mavundla stood as a candidate for eThekwini ward 10 in a by-election in November 2022, finishing third with 1% of the vote behind the DA (95%) and ANC (4%).

Despite an interdict being granted by the Durban High Court, the ANC in the eThekwini municipality tabled and voted for a motion of no confidence removing Mavundla as the deputy mayor. 125 councillors supported the motion while 59 opposed it. Mavundla resigned from the eThekwini council on 23 February 2023.

Mavundla contested the by-election in Ward 2 in the Umvoti Municipality on 14 June 2023, and lost as the IFP won the ward off the ANC. On 21 June 2023, Mavundla was elected mayor of Umvoti municipality after a coalition agreement between the ANC and ABC was reached to govern the municipality.

In 2024, Mavundla stated that he and the Abantu Batho Congress would be campaigning for an independent Zulu state, stating that the current Republic of South Africa is a legacy of colonialism that marginalizes indigenous nations and that only by removing Zulus from a colonial governance model forced on them can the Zulu nation develop along its own indigenous model.

== Personal life ==
Mavundla is a polygamist. He has three wives, Cindy, Tersia and Mpume, and 21 children. In 2010, one of his wives, Thandi Mavundla, was found dead.
