= Munzoor Shaik Emam =

South African politician

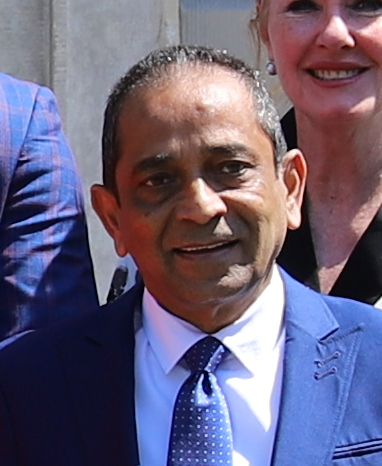
- Emam in 2023

Member of the National Assembly of South Africa
- In office 25 June 2019 – 11 April 2024
- In office 21 May 2014 – 7 May 2019

Personal details
- Born: Ahmed Munzoor Shaik Emam
- Party: Allied Movement for Change (2024–present)
- Other political affiliations: National Freedom Party (until 2024); Inkatha Freedom Party (former)

Ahmed Munzoor Shaik Emam is a South African politician who served as a Member of the National Assembly of South Africa for the National Freedom Party twice, from May 2014 to May 2019 and again from June 2019 until he defected to the Allied Movement for Change in April 2024. He is currently president of the Allied Movement for Change.

== Political career ==
Emam was a member of ACTSTOP in Johannesburg and later joined the United Democratic Front. He was also a member of the Inkatha Freedom Party, but resigned from the party to be part of the establishment of the National Freedom Party.

== Parliamentary career ==
Emam was elected to the National Assembly in the 2014 general election. He took office as an MP on 21 May 2014. During his first term, he was a member of the following committees: public accounts, appropriations and health.

In March 2018, Emam voted for the establishment of an ad hoc committee to amend section 25 of the South African constitution. He did not win re-election in May 2019, as he was placed low on the party's list. Party leader Zanele kaMagwaza-Msibi resigned from Parliament in June 2019, and the party selected Emam to fill her seat. He took office on 25 June 2019.

Emam controversially stated in Parliament in February 2024 "that the City of Cape Town will be a bloodbath and that we will not allow Zionists to make this a Jewish State."

In April 2024, Emam resigned from the NFP and became leader of the Allied Movement for Change.

=== Committees ===
He received his new committee assignments in July 2019.

Committee	Position
Joint Standing Committee on Financial Management of Parliament	Member
Portfolio Committee on Agriculture, Land Reform and Rural Development	Member
Portfolio Committee on Health	Member
Portfolio Committee on Home Affairs	Member
Portfolio Committee on Human Settlements, Water and Sanitation	Alternate Member
Portfolio Committee on International Relations and Cooperation	Member
Portfolio Committee on Justice and Correctional Services	Member
Portfolio Committee on Police	Member
Portfolio Committee on Social Development	Member
Portfolio Committee on Trade and Industry	Member
Standing Committee on Appropriations	Member
Committee for Section 194 Enquiry	Member
