= Portfolio Committee on International Relations and Cooperation =

Portfolio committee in the National Assembly of South Africa

The Portfolio Committee on International Relations and Cooperation is a portfolio committee in the National Assembly of South Africa that focuses on the Department of International Relations and Cooperation as well as the African Renaissance and International Cooperation Fund.

As of August 2021, Supra Mahumapelo of the African National Congress serves as Chair of the Committee.

== Membership ==
The committee consists of 11 members: six from the African National Congress, two from the Democratic Alliance, one from the Economic Freedom Fighters and two members from other parties. As of December 2020, the committee's current members are as follows:

Member	Party
Supra Mahumapelo MP (Chairperson)	African National Congress
Darren Bergman MP	Democratic Alliance
Mergan Chetty MP	Democratic Alliance
Kenneth Meshoe MP	African Christian Democratic Party
Desmond Moela MP	African National Congress
Terence Mpanza MP	African National Congress
Thembi Msane MP	Economic Freedom Fighters
Corné Mulder MP	Freedom Front Plus
Simon Nkosi MP	African National Congress
Bernice Swarts MP	African National Congress
Thandiwe Zungu MP	African National Congress

The following people serve as alternate members:

Alternate Member	Party
Willem Faber MP	Democratic Alliance
Ganief Hendricks MP	Al Jama-ah
Mkhuleko Hlengwa MP	Inkatha Freedom Party
Bantu Holomisa MP	United Democratic Movement
Mosiuoa Lekota MP	Congress of the People
Xola Nqola MP	African National Congress
Munzoor Shaik Emam MP	National Freedom Party

== See also ==
- Committees of the Parliament of South Africa
