= Kranskop =

- Location within KwaZulu-Natal Location within South Africa
- Coordinates: 28°58′S 30°51′E
- Country: South Africa
- Province: KwaZulu-Natal
- District: Umzinyathi
- Municipality: Umvoti

Area
  - Total: 1.48 km^{2} (0.57 sq mi)

Population (2011)
  - Total: 1,514
  - Density: 1,020/km^{2} (2,650/sq mi)

Racial makeup (2011)
  - Black African: 86.4%
  - Coloured: 3.6%
  - Indian/Asian: 6.5%
  - White: 2.3%
  - Other: 1.2%

First languages (2011)
  - Zulu: 80.6%
  - English: 9.9%
  - Afrikaans: 1.5%
  - Other: 7.9%
- Time zone: UTC+2 (SAST)
- PO box: 3268
- Area code: 033

Kranskop is a small town that is situated on the edge of the Thukela River valley in KwaZulu-Natal, South Africa. It was founded in 1894 as village called Hopetown but following confusion with another town of the same name in the Great Karoo, Northern Cape, the name was changed. Kranskop was chosen and is named after two cliff faces that rise 1,175 metres above the Thukela Valley near the town. The name is an Afrikaans word meaning "cliff head."

The Kranskop rock formation has major significance in local Zulu legend and folklore, for whom it is called "Ntunjambili". The Zulu have ancient stories about a forbidden cave and a hill opening that provides protection from cannibals, but then it closes on those who have entered.

== Education ==
Deutsche Schule Hermannsburg, a private school, is 15 kilometres (9.3 mi) from Kranskop.
