= Umvoti Local Municipality =

Coordinates: 29°03′49″S 30°35′20″E

Umvoti
- Local municipality
- Seal

- Location in KwaZulu-Natal
- Country: South Africa
- Province: KwaZulu-Natal
- District: uMzinyathi
- Seat: Greytown
- Wards: 14

Government
  - Type: Municipal council
  - Mayor: Philani Mavundla (ABC)

Area
  - Total: 2,516 km^{2} (971 sq mi)

Population (2011)
  - Total: 103,093
  - Density: 40.97/km^{2} (106.1/sq mi)

Racial makeup (2011)
  - Black African: 94.6%
  - Coloured: 0.8%
  - Indian/Asian: 2.2%
  - White: 2.2%

First languages (2011)
  - Zulu: 90.9%
  - English: 5.0%
  - Other: 4.1%
- Time zone: UTC+2 (SAST)
- Municipal code: KZN245

Umvoti Municipality (Zulu: UMasipala wase Umvoti) is a local municipality within the Umzinyathi District Municipality, in the KwaZulu-Natal province of South Africa.

The municipality is named after the Umvoti River, which runs from the west to the east towards the Indian Ocean. The municipality is situated nearer the mouth of the river.

Greytown, a small but vibrant town, is the main provider of higher income jobs in senior management, and professional and technical services, providing 26.8% of all jobs in the Umvoti area. The manufacturing sector makes the second largest contribution to the local economy. There is limited economic activity taking place within the traditional authority areas.

== Main places ==
The 2001 census divided the municipality into the following main places:

Place	Code	Area (km^{2})	Population
Amakhabela	52301	352.14	13,734
Bomvu	52302	120.15	18,054
Cele Nhlangwini	52303	26.60	6,447
Enhlalakahle	52304	1.45	8,530
Greytown	52305	6.83	7,290
Hlongwa	52306	12.24	21
Kranskop	52307	1.47	834
Mgome	52308	28.54	2,195
Mthembu	52309	54.98	9,031
Ngcolosi	52310	75.63	5,006
Ntanzi	52311	6.91	214
Remainder of the municipality	52312	1,824.16	20,935

== Politics ==
The municipal council consists of twenty-seven members elected by mixed-member proportional representation. Fourteen councillors are elected by first-past-the-post voting in fourteen wards, while the remaining thirteen are chosen from party lists so that the total number of party representatives is proportional to the number of votes received.

No party won a majority in the election of 4 November 2026, with the Inkatha Freedom Party winning the most seats, nine.

The following table shows the results of the election.

Party	Ward			List			Total seats
Party	Votes	%	Seats	Votes	%	Seats	Total seats
Inkatha Freedom Party	12,382	33.91	8	12,229	33.47	1	9
African National Congress	11,061	30.29	2	10,954	29.98	6	8
uMkhonto weSizwe Party	9,875	27.04	3	10,048	27.50	5	8
Democratic Alliance	1,552	4.25	1	1,567	4.29	0	1
Abantu Batho Congress	907	2.48	0	985	2.70	1	1
8 other parties	740	2.03	0	754	2.06	0	0
Total	36,517	100.00	14	36,537	100.00	13	27
Valid votes	36,517	98.76		36,537	98.71		
Invalid/blank votes	459	1.24		479	1.29		
Total votes	36,976	100.00		37,016	100.00		
Registered voters/turnout	65,647	56.33		65,647	56.39		
