= Canaan Mdletshe =

South African politician (1976 or 1977 – 2024)

Member of the National Assembly of South Africa
- In office 24 April 2024 – 28 May 2024
- Preceded by: Munzoor Shaik Emam

Secretary-General of the National Freedom Party
- In office December 2019 – 14 June 2024 (Note: Contested by Teddy Thwala from December 2023)
- Succeeded by: Teddy Thwala

Personal details
- Born: 1976 or 1977 Nongoma, Natal, South Africa
- Died: 5 December 2024 (aged 47) Mtubatuba, KwaZulu-Natal, South Africa
- Party: National Freedom Party (2011–2024) uMkhonto weSizwe (2024)
- Children: 3
- Profession: Journalist

Canaan Mdletshe (1976 or 1977 – 5 December 2024) was a South African journalist and politician who was a Member of the National Assembly of South Africa from April until May 2024, representing the National Freedom Party (NFP), of which he served as secretary-general.

== Biography ==
Mdletshe was born in Nongoma. Before entering politics, he worked as a political reporter at The Sowetan and as a news editor at The New Age. He also worked at the TimesLIVE. Mdletshe left those positions in 2013.

He was elected Secretary-General of the NFP in December 2019. His term ended when he resigned on 14 June 2024, although it had been contested by Teddy Thwala since December 2023.

Mdletshe was attacked by a group of people during a layover in Ulundi, a local political violence hotspot at the time, during the 2021 South African municipal elections. He later opened a criminal case regarding the incident.

Mdletshe was not included on any NFP candidate lists for the 2024 general election and left the parliament as a result.

In June 2024, after the NFP joined the Government of Provincial Unity in the aftermath of the 2024 KwaZulu-Natal provincial election, Mdletshe resigned from the party. He had joined the NFP when it was founded in 2011.

In August 2024, Mdletshe joined the MK Party.

Mdletshe was married and had three children. He died in a traffic collision in Mtubatuba on 5 December 2024, at the age of 47.
