= Terence Mpanza =

South African politician (b. 1964)

Member of the National Assembly of South Africa
- In office 4 May 2017 – 28 May 2024
- Preceded by: Agnes Qikani

Personal details
- Born: Terence Skhumbuzo Mpanza; 4 October 1964 (age 62)
- Party: African National Congress
- Education: University of Natal (BA)
- Profession: Politician
- Committees: Portfolio Committee on International Relations and Cooperation

Terence Skhumbuzo Mpanza (born 4 October 1964) is a South African politician. He is a former Member of the National Assembly of South Africa. Mpanza is a member of the African National Congress.

== Education ==
Mpanza holds a Bachelor of Arts (BA) from the University of Natal.

== Political career ==
Mpanza became involved in politics while at university. He was a member of the South African Student Congress and served on the leadership of the organisation at the University of Natal. He served on the Students' Representative Council (SRC) at the University of Natal. Mpanza was a South African Municipal Workers' Union shop steward at the Msunduzi Local Municipality. He has also been a regional treasurer, regional chairperson, provincial chairperson and a member of the National Executive Committee of SAMWU. He formerly served as the secretary-general of South African National Civics Organisation.

=== Parliament ===
Mpanza became a member of the National Assembly on 4 May 2017. He replaced Agnes Qikani, who resigned. On 23 May 2017, he became an alternate member of the Committee On Auditor-General and a member of the Portfolio Committee On Transport.

On 21 January 2019, Mpanza and SANCO president Richard Mdakane appeared in the Durban Magistrate's court over graft charges. They are accused of creating false invoices for a skills development project and allegedly channelling more than R1 million to themselves.

Mpanza was placed on the ANC's national list for the 2019 general election and was re-elected at the election. He currently serves on the Portfolio Committee on International Relations and Cooperation.

During a committee meeting in October 2020, Mpanza said that the lack of female South African candidates to fill positions on the African Union Commission was highly unacceptable and could not be tolerated that the principles of gender equality and representation were not considered.

Mpanza did not seek reelection in 2024 and left parliament.
