= Thembi Msane =

South African politician

Ekurhuleni Member of Mayoral Committee
- Incumbent
- Assumed office 2023

Member of the South African National Assembly
- Incumbent
- Assumed office September 2023

Member of the KwaZulu-Natal Legislature
- In office 21 May 2014 – 7 May 2019

Personal details
- Party: Economic Freedom Fighters

Thembi Portia Msane is a former South African Member of Parliament for the Economic Freedom Fighters. Prior to serving in parliament, she was a member of the KwaZulu-Natal Legislature from 2014 to 2019.

Msane was a member of the Portfolio Committee on International Relations and Cooperation from May 2019 until September 2023. She was also an alternate member of the Portfolio Committee On Trade and Industry between September 2020 and July 2023.

Msane resigned from Parliament with effect from 12 September 2023.

Msane was sworn in as an Economic Freedom Fighters councillor in the City of Ekurhuleni on 18 September 2023.

Councillor Thembi Msane has been appointed Member of the Mayoral Committee for Water, Sanitation & Energy in Germiston on 9 October 2023.^{5}

Cmsr Thembi Msane was appointed National Spokesperson of EFF in February 2025

The EFF has on the 23rd June 2026 announced the appointment of Thembi Msane as one of the new election spokespersons for the upcoming local government elections.
