= Mandisa Mashego =

South African politician (born 1973)

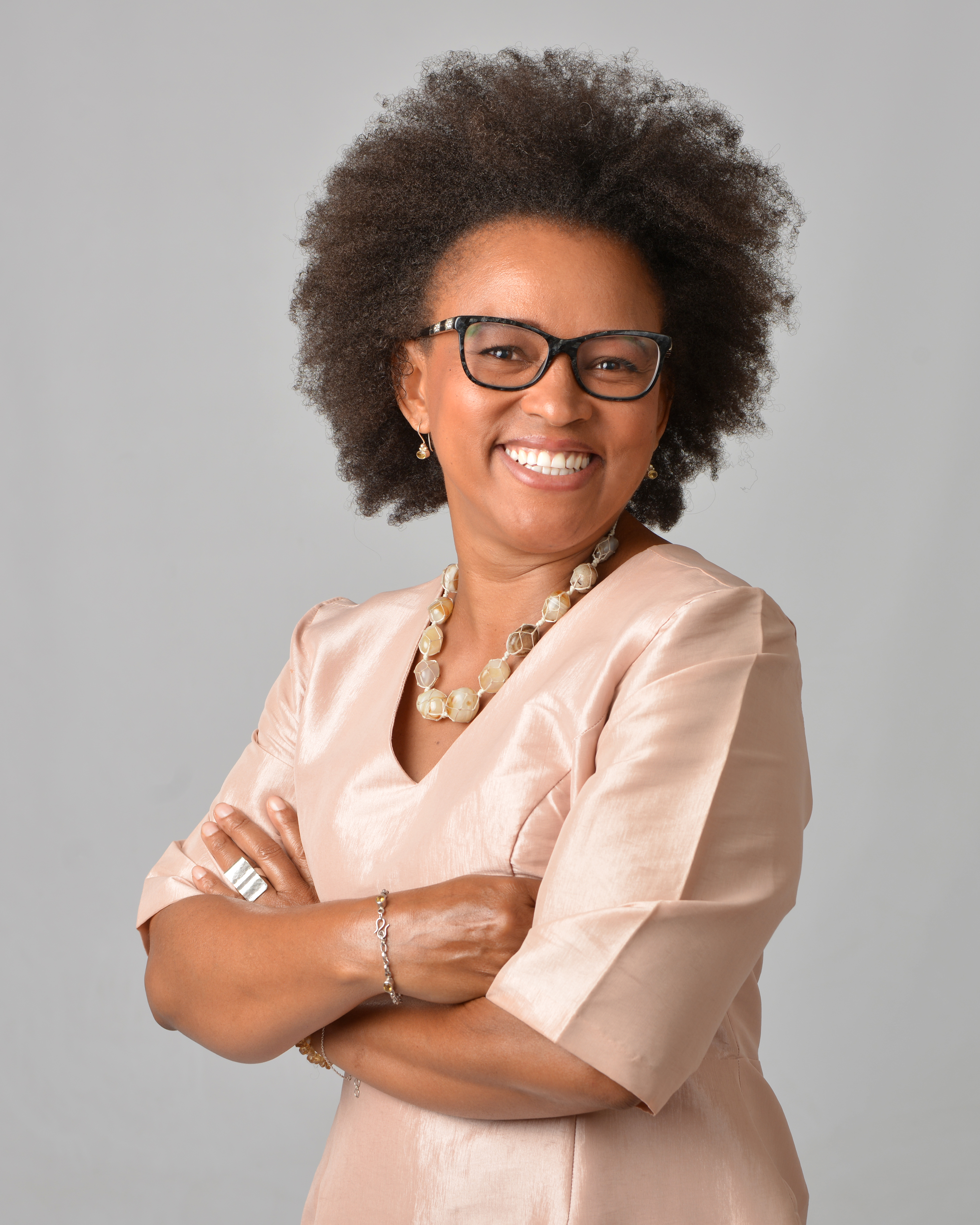

Member of the Gauteng Provincial Legislature
- In office 21 May 2014 – 31 March 2020

Provincial Chairperson of the Gauteng Economic Freedom Fighters
- In office 2 September 2018 (Note: Acting: 18 March 2015 – 2 September 2018) – 31 March 2020
- Preceded by: Zorro Boshielo
- Succeeded by: Itani Mukwevho

Personal details
- Born: 26 August 1973 (age 53) King William's Town, Cape Province, South Africa
- Party: Abantu Batho Congress (2021–present)
- Other political affiliations: Economic Freedom Fighters (2013–2020)
- Children: 1
- Education: Durban University of Technology
- Occupation: Politician

Mandisa Sibongile Mashego (born 26 August 1973) is a South African politician and feminist. A former member of the Economic Freedom Fighters (EFF), she served as the party's provincial chairperson in Gauteng from 2018 to 2020. She was also a Member of the Gauteng Provincial Legislature from 2014 to 2020.

== Early life ==
Mashego was born in King William's Town, Cape Province, to a black mother and a white father. She grew up in the Mayfern township of Nelspruit. She obtained a B-Tech in Public Relations from the Durban University of Technology.

== Political career ==
Mashego joined the African National Congress (ANC) while still a student. She left the ANC in 2012 and soon joined the EFF. She was elected as a Member of the Gauteng Provincial Legislature in 2014 and the following year, she was appointed acting provincial chairperson of the EFF following the resignation of Zorro Boshielo. Mashego was elected provincial chairperson for a full term in 2018 and consequently became the party's second elected female provincial chairperson.

=== Political views ===
Mashego describes herself as a feminist and an opponent of patriarchy. She said in an interview with the Mail & Guardian that the replacement of the party's first female provincial chairperson, Betty Diale, "saddened" her.

In April 2020, Mashego announced that she supports the reintroduction of the death penalty in South Africa.

=== Tensions with Julius Malema ===
In December 2019 at the EFF's national elective conference, Mashego opposed Marshall Dlamini for the position of Secretary-General. Her opposition to Dlamini caused tensions between her and party leader Julius Malema. Malema later suggested in a tweet, which caused speculation, that Mashego was planning on defecting to former Johannesburg mayor Herman Mashaba's party.

In February 2020, the Sunday World newspaper reported that Mashego had resigned as provincial chairperson and as a Member of the Gauteng Provincial Legislature. The EFF disputed this claim and Mashego later denied that she had resigned.

On 31 March 2020, Mashego resigned as EFF provincial chairperson and also from the provincial legislature. Deputy chairperson Itani Mukwevho was named her successor. In August 2020, Mashego made an appearance at the launch of Mashaba's political party, ActionSA.

In January 2021, Mashego announced that she had joined the Abantu Batho Congress.

== Personal life ==
Mashego has not been married and has one daughter.
