= National People's Front (South Africa) =

Political party in South Africa

- Founder: Bheki Gumbi
- Founded: 2018
- Ideology: African nationalism
- National Assembly seats: 0 / 400
- Provincial Legislatures: 0 / 430

Website
- www.facebook.com/groups/501538673709286/

The National People's Front (NAPF) is a South African political party formed in 2018 by Bheki Gumbi, former national deputy chairperson of the National Freedom Party (NFP).

The party is campaigning on a platform of fast-forwarding land expropriation, strong borders, priority for South Africans over foreign nationals, and on abolishing "Roman laws".

The party contested the 2019 general election, failing to win any seats.

== Nongoma ==
Gumbi won a seat in the 2021 local government election in Nongoma after the party finished with just under 1% of the vote, earning a single list seat. Gumbi briefly held the balance of power in the council after the defeat of the Inkatha Freedom Party (IFP) candidate in a ward 20 by-election, leaving the council split between 22 seats for the IFP/Economic Freedom Fighters (EFF) coalition, and 22 seats for the NFP/African National Congress (ANC) coalition. The EFF later threw its weight behind the NFP/ANC.

== Election results ==
=== National elections ===
Election	Total votes	Share of vote	Seats	+/–	Government
2019	4,019	0.02%	0 / 400	–	extraparliamentary

=== Provincial elections ===
Election	Eastern Cape		Free State		Gauteng		Kwazulu-Natal		Limpopo		Mpumalanga		North-West		Northern Cape		Western Cape	
Election	%	Seats	%	Seats	%	Seats	%	Seats	%	Seats	%	Seats	%	Seats	%	Seats	%	Seats
2019	-	-	-	-	0.03%	0/73	0.07%	0/80	-	-	-	-	-	-	-	-	-	-
