= Zanele kaMagwaza-Msibi =

South African politician (1962–2021)

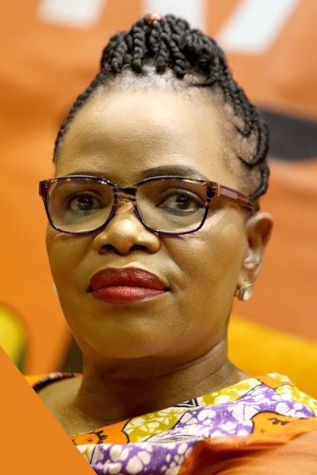

Deputy Minister of Science and Technology
- In office 6 June 2014 – 25 May 2019
- President: Jacob Zuma
- Minister: Mmamoloko Kubayi-Ngubane; Naledi Pandor
- Preceded by: Michael Masutha
- Succeeded by: Position dissolved

Leader of the National Freedom Party
- In office 25 January 2011 – 6 September 2021
- Preceded by: Position established

Member of the National Assembly of South Africa
- In office 21 May 2014 – 20 June 2019

Personal details
- Born: 1 February 1962 Makhosini, Natal, South Africa
- Died: 6 September 2021 (aged 59) Durban, KwaZulu-Natal, South Africa
- Party: National Freedom Party

Zanele kaMagwaza-Msibi (1 February 1962 – 6 September 2021) was a South African politician who was the Deputy Minister of Science and Technology of South Africa in the cabinet of Jacob Zuma. She was also President of the National Freedom Party (NFP). Prior to being elected to Parliament, she served for nineteen years as a councillor, fifteen of those years as Mayor of the Zululand District Municipality. She was formerly chairperson of the Inkatha Freedom Party (IFP) and the IFP's candidate for Premier of KwaZulu-Natal in the 2009 general election.

On 7 May 2014, her new party successfully contested the 2014 South African general elections by receiving 288,742 (1.57%) of the national votes. This outcome placed the NFP in fifth place, winning 6 seats in the National Assembly.

== Early life and education ==
Born in rural Makhosini, Magwaza-Msibi was a former school principal who held a BA degree from the University of Zululand and diplomas (in further education) from the then-University of Natal and (in local government) from the then-University of Durban-Westville.

== Career ==
Having joined the Inkatha Freedom Party (IFP) as a teenager in 1975, Magwaza-Msibi grew up within the IFP. She first served as branch chairperson in 1976. Thereafter, she joined the executive committee of the Youth and the Women's Brigade 13 years later (1988). This was followed by the deputy chairperson's position of the Youth Brigade (1998-2003) and later she became the national secretary of the Women's Brigade.

Prior to this, she had occupied several senior administrative positions in the local and town councils, and played a leading role in numerous community projects. In 1995, she was the only woman on the executive board of the Nongoma Transitional Local Council. The following year (1996) she became chairperson of the Emakhosini sub-region, which comprised Ulundi and Babanango.

She was appointed the first mayor of the Zululand District Municipality in 2000 after the first local government elections in the new dispensation.

In 2005, she unsuccessfully contested the position of IFP Deputy National Chairperson, losing to Stanley Dladla. However, when the National Chairperson, Ziba Jiyane, left the party to form the National Democratic Convention, Magwaza-Msibi was put forward as a candidate and elected unopposed at the 2006 national conference. As second-in-command in the IFP, she was touted as a potential successor to party leader Mangosuthu Buthelezi when he decided to step down.

=== Party switch and formation of the NFP ===
After the IFP's dismal results in the 2009 general elections, members of the party began debating a change in leadership for the upcoming 2011 local government elections. With party leader Buthelezi previously stating in 2005 that he would not seek re-election, the succession battle brewed down to those supporting Magwaza-Msibi (including the Youth Brigade and SADESMO), old-guard leaders supporting general secretary Musa Zondi, and those in the National Council advocating Buthelezi to remain leader to preserve unity. Relations between Magwaza-Msibi and IFP leadership soured after her supporters began openly campaigning for her, with some being expelled from the party for "sowing division" in the party. Magwaza-Msibi eventually left the Inkatha Freedom Party and announced the formation of the National Freedom Party on 25 January 2011 in Durban, saying she accepted her expulsion from the IFP after "more than two years of marginalisation and ostracism". IFP leader Buthelezi, in response, described Magwaza-Msibi's actions as establishing a party based on "disgruntlement and ambition" rather than ideologies or values and that he "struggled to understand how she could inflict such damage on a party she professed to love."

The first election contested by the National Freedom Party was the 2011 local government election, a few months after the party's foundation. The NFP achieved success in KwaZulu-Natal and Magwaza-Msibi became Mayor of Zululand District Municipality following a coalition deal between the NFP and the ANC to co-govern 19 hung municipalities in the province.

Following the National Freedom Party's success in the 2014 general election, Magwaza-Msibi decided to resign as Mayor of Zululand District Municipality in order to lead the NFP in Parliament. On 25 May 2014, President Jacob Zuma notified Magwaza-Msibi of his intention to appoint her as Deputy Minister of Science & Technology. After consulting with party leadership, she accepted but stated her intention to remain autonomous and maintain her own views. The appointment was derided by members of the DA and IFP as Magwaza-Msibi having "sold out her supporters". She was sworn in on the evening of 6 June.

The NFP was barred from participating in the 2016 municipal elections, because of the party not paying its registration fee on time. The party's support was greatly diminished in the May 2019 elections. Magwaza-Msibi was not reappointed to the national cabinet and resigned from Parliament in June 2019, citing her intention to rebuild the party.

== Personal life and death ==
She was the mother of actress Gugu Gumede. She was reported to have suffered a stroke on 16 November 2014 and was taken to hospital in a critical condition.

She was married to Mandla Msibi who was the first black editor for television news under the SABC. Magwaza-Msibi died from COVID-19-related cardiac arrest at a hospital in Durban, South Africa on 6 September 2021, at the age of 59.

== See also ==
- African Commission on Human and Peoples' Rights
- Constitution of South Africa
- History of the African National Congress
- Politics in South Africa
- Provincial governments of South Africa
