= Allied Movement for Change =

Political party in South Africa

- President: Ahmed Munzoor Shaik Emam
- Founded: 2024
- Split from: National Freedom Party
- Ideology: Ubuntu; Protectionism; Islamic democracy
- National Assembly seats: 0 / 400
- Provincial Legislatures: 0 / 430

Website
- am4c.org

The Allied Movement for Change (AM4C) is a minor political party in South Africa. The party was founded by Ahmed Munzoor Shaik Emam, a former National Freedom Party (NFP) member and businessman. The party was launched in March 2024 in Johannesburg.

== History ==
=== Origin ===
The AM4C was founded in 2024 by a group of individuals who broke away from the NFP. Its policies focus on economic growth and social welfare.

== Current structure and composition ==
The AMCP has a central committee led by Ahmed Munzoor Shaik Emam as the president, with a secretary-general and other office bearers. The party has a small presence in a few provinces, with most of its support coming from the Gauteng Province.

== Election results ==
=== National Assembly elections ===
Election	Party leader	Total votes	Share of vote	Seats	+/–	Government
2024	Ahmed Munzoor Shaik Emam	22,055	0.14% (Note: From 2024, seats in the National Assembly are determined by a combination of the national ballot, and the nine regional ballots. Only the national ballot figures are shown here.)	0 / 400	New	Extra-parliamentary

=== Provincial elections ===
Election	Eastern Cape		Free State		Gauteng		Kwazulu-Natal		Limpopo		Mpumalanga		North-West		Northern Cape		Western Cape	
Election	%	Seats	%	Seats	%	Seats	%	Seats	%	Seats	%	Seats	%	Seats	%	Seats	%	Seats
2024					0.11%	0/80	0.23%	0/80	-	-	-	-	-	-	-	-	0.26%	0/42

=== Municipal elections ===
The AMCPP has contested local government elections in 2016 and national elections in 2019 but only has won four seats.

== Foreign policy and relations ==
The AHCP has not articulated a clear foreign policy but has expressed support for African unity and solidarity with other African nations. The AMCP has been criticized for its lack of clear policies and its perceived opportunism in breaking away from the ANC.
