= African Mantungwa Community =

Political party in South Africa

- Leader: Mduduzi Khumalo
- Founded: 2015
- National Assembly seats: 0 / 400
- Provincial Legislatures: 0 / 430

Website
- www.facebook.com/groups/341087552893315/

African Mantungwa Community is a minor political party in South Africa.

The party advocates land expropriation without compensation, free education, and support for traditional leaders. It is based in Kwazulu-Natal, and has close ties with the Mantungwa community. It contested in the 2016 municipal election, as well as a number of local government by-elections in Kwazulu Natal, all without success.

The party contested the 2019 South African general election at the provincial level in KwaZulu-Natal only, failing to win a seat.

== Election results ==
=== Provincial elections ===
Election	Eastern Cape		Free State		Gauteng		KwaZulu-Natal		Limpopo		Mpumalanga		North-West		Northern Cape		Western Cape	
Election	%	Seats	%	Seats	%	Seats	%	Seats	%	Seats	%	Seats	%	Seats	%	Seats	%	Seats
2019	-	-	-	-	-	-	0.04%	0/80	-	-	-	-	-	-	-	-	-	-

=== Municipal elections ===
Election	Votes	%	Seats
2016	12,555	0.03%	0
2021	5,742	0.02%	0
2026	1,619	0.00%	0
