= Abantu Batho Congress =

South African political party

- Abbreviation: ABC
- President: Philani Mavundla
- Deputy President: Makhosi Khoza
- Founded: 8 January 2020; 6 years ago
- Split from: National Freedom Party
- Ideology: Zulu nationalism Pan-Africanism
- eThekwini Metropolitan Council: 0 / 222

Website
- https://abantubatho.org/

Abantu Batho Congress (ABC) is a South African political party established by businessman Philani Mavundla.

The party describes itself as an Afrocentric, Pan-Africanist and womanist revolutionary movement.

In January 2021, former Economic Freedom Fighters Gauteng leader Mandisa Mashego joined the new party.

The party contested the 2021 South African municipal elections, targeting Durban and the eThekwini Metropolitan Municipality.

In 2024, the Abantu Batho Congress came out in support of an independent Zulu state.

== Leadership disputes ==
In November 2023, a faction elected Bhungu Gwala as president of the party. Reigning president Philani Mavundla disputed the decision, and both leaders attempted to fire each other from the party. In 2024, the Electoral Court ruled in favour of Mavundla.

== Election results ==
=== National Assembly elections ===
Election	Party leader	Total votes	Share of vote	Seats	+/–	Government
2024	Philani Mavundla	5,531	0.03% (Note: From 2024, seats in the National Assembly are determined by a combination of the national ballot, and the nine regional ballots. Only the national ballot figures are shown here.)	0 / 400	New	Extra-parliamentary

=== Provincial elections ===
Election	Eastern Cape		Free State		Gauteng		Kwazulu-Natal		Limpopo		Mpumalanga		North-West		Northern Cape		Western Cape	
Election	%	Seats	%	Seats	%	Seats	%	Seats	%	Seats	%	Seats	%	Seats	%	Seats	%	Seats
2024			0.07	0/30			0.09	0/80										

=== Municipal elections ===
In the 2021 municipal elections, the party won 25 seats, 23 in Kwazulu-Natal, and two in Limpopo.

Election	Votes	%	Seats
2021	109,457	0.36%	25

== See also ==
- South African politics
- African National Congress
