= National Freedom Party =

Political party in South Africa

- Abbreviation: NFP
- Leader: Ivan Rowan Barnes
- Founder: Zanele kaMagwaza-Msibi
- Founded: 25 January 2011
- Split from: Inkatha Freedom Party
- Ideology: Social democracy Egalitarianism
- Political position: Centre-left
- Colours: Orange Green
- National Assembly seats: 0 / 400
- NCOP seats: 0 / 90
- Provincial Legislatures: 1 / 430

The National Freedom Party (NFP) is a South African political party. It was launched on 25 January 2011 by Zanele kaMagwaza-Msibi, former chairperson of the Inkatha Freedom Party (IFP), along with other former IFP members. Similar to the IFP, the party's main base is in KwaZulu-Natal.

== History ==
In the 2011 municipal election, the NFP received 2.4% of the votes cast in South Africa, and 10.4% of the votes cast in KwaZulu-Natal province. It won a majority of seats in the eDumbe Local Municipality and a plurality in Nongoma Local Municipality. Following the 2014 South African general election, the party's leader Magwaza-Msibi was appointed to the position of Deputy Minister of Science and Technology. The party was disqualified from participating in the 2016 municipal election as it had failed to pay the election fee to the Independent Electoral Commission.

The party contested the 2019 general elections and its support levels dropped. The party lost four seats in the National Assembly, bringing their seat total to only two seats. In KwaZulu-Natal, the party's support was greatly diminished. The party had lost five seats in the provincial legislature, but managed to win a single seat, occupied by the party's National Organizer, Cynthia Mbali Shinga. Magwaza-Msibi was not reappointed to the cabinet and resigned as an MP on 20 June 2019, citing her intention to rebuild the party.

On 6 September 2021, shortly before the 2021 South African municipal elections, Magwaza-Msibi died from a COVID-19-related cardiac arrest.

The party won 170,616 votes, 0.56% of the national total, in the elections, winning back one municipality it formerly ran in 2011 to 2016, the eDumbe Local Municipality.

A party conference elected Ivan Rowan Barnes as president and Teddy Thwala as secretary-general in December 2023. The election was disputed by former secretary-general Canaan Mdletshe.

Before the 2024 South African general election Thwala and Barnes fell out. Thwala tried to stop the submission of the electoral lists to the Independent Electoral Commission in the Pietermaritzburg High Court, but failed. Thwala was dismissed in November 2024.

Although the party lost all of its national seats in the 2024 elections, it retained one seat in the KwaZulu-Natal Legislature. The party's single seat was crucial in coalition discussions, with the largest party, uMkhonto weSizwe, supported by the Economic Freedom Fighters holding 39 seats, and the Inkatha Freedom Party, African National Congress, and Democratic Alliance jointly holding 40. The NFP supported the latter, giving the coalition a majority of 41 seats in the 80-seat legislature.

In June 2025, Barnes attempted to oust Mbali Shinga, the party's sole MEC in KwaZulu-Natal, with Barnes in position to replace her. Shinga retained her position after a legal challenge.

Infighting continued, with further attempts to oust Shinga, and, in June 2026, national chairperson Sibusiso Mkhabela announcing that he was suspending Barnes.

== Election results ==
=== National Assembly elections ===
| Election | Party leader | Total votes | Share of vote | Seats | +/– | Government |
|---|---|---|---|---|---|---|
| 2014 | Zanele kaMagwaza-Msibi | 288,742 | 1.57% | 6 / 400 | New | Opposition |
| 2019 | Zanele kaMagwaza-Msibi | 61,220 | 0.35% | 2 / 400 | ▼4 | Opposition |
| 2024 | Ivan Rowan Barnes | 19,397 | 0.12% (Note: From 2024, seats in the National Assembly are determined by a combination of the national ballot, and the nine regional ballots. Only the national ballot figures are shown here.) | 0 / 400 | ▼2 | Extra-parliamentary |

=== Provincial elections ===
| Election | Eastern Cape | | Free State | | Gauteng | | Kwazulu-Natal | | Limpopo | | Mpumalanga | | North-West | | Northern Cape | | Western Cape | |
| Election | % | Seats | % | Seats | % | Seats | % | Seats | % | Seats | % | Seats | % | Seats | % | Seats | % | Seats |
|---|---|---|---|---|---|---|---|---|---|---|---|---|---|---|---|---|---|---|
| 2014 | 0.16 | 0/63 | 0.11 | 0/30 | 0.47 | 0/73 | 7.31 | 6/80 | 0.04 | 0/49 | 0.75 | 0/30 | 0.15 | 0/33 | 0.03 | 0/30 | 0.04 | 0/42 |
| 2019 | 0.03 | 0/63 | 0.03 | 0/30 | 0.07 | 0/73 | 1.57 | 1/80 | 0.01 | 0/49 | 0.12 | 0/30 | 0.06 | 0/33 | 0.04 | 0/30 | 0.11 | 0/42 |
| 2024 | | | 0.03 | 0/30 | 0.03 | 0/80 | 0.56 | 1/80 | | | 0.04 | 0/51 | | | | | | |

=== Municipal elections ===
| Election | Votes | % |
|---|---|---|
| 2011 | 644,917 | 2.4% |
| 2016 | 5,224 | 0.01% |
| 2021 | 170,616 | 0.56% |

== Breakaway parties ==
A number of small parties have broken away from the NFP, including the Abantu Batho Congress, the African People's Movement, formed by former chairperson Vikizitha Mlotshwa, and the National People's Front, formed by former national deputy chairperson Bheki Gumbi.

Former NFP member of parliament Munzoor Shaik Emam joined the Allied Movement for Change and took over as party leader.
