= List of members of the 7th Western Cape Provincial Parliament =

This is a list of the current members of the seventh Western Cape Provincial Parliament, elected following the 2024 provincial election.

Name	Parliamentary group	Office
Reagen Allen	Democratic Alliance	Deputy Speaker
Deidre Baartman	Democratic Alliance	Minister for Finance
Ayanda Bans	African National Congress	Chief Whip of the Official Opposition
Memory Booysen	Democratic Alliance	
Gillon Bosman	Democratic Alliance	Chief Whip
Anton Bredell	Democratic Alliance	Minister for Local Government, Environmental Affairs, and Development Planning
Galil Brinkhuis	Al Jama-ah	
Dave Bryant	Democratic Alliance	
Aishah Cassiem	Economic Freedom Fighters	
Ferlon Christians	African Christian Democratic Party	
Noel Constable	Patriotic Alliance	
Brett Herron	GOOD	
Duwayne Jacobs	National Coloured Congress	
Peter Johnson	Democratic Alliance	
Wendy Kaizer-Philander	Democratic Alliance	
Fransie Kamfer	African National Congress	
Pat Lekker	African National Congress	
Thozama Lithakong	Economic Freedom Fighters	
Jaco Londt	Democratic Alliance	Minister for Social Development
Ricardo Mackenzie	Democratic Alliance	Minister for Cultural Affairs and Sport
Grant Marais	Freedom Front Plus	
Anroux Marais	Democratic Alliance	Minister for Police Oversight and Community Safety
Noko Masipa	Democratic Alliance	
David Maynier	Democratic Alliance	Minister for Education
Nomafrench Mbombo	Democratic Alliance	
Ivan Meyer	Democratic Alliance	Minister for Agriculture, Economic Development and Tourism
Daylin Mitchell	Democratic Alliance	Speaker
Benson Ngqentsu	African National Congress	
Nomi Nkondlo	African National Congress	
Bazil Petrus	Patriotic Alliance	
Khalid Sayed	African National Congress	Leader of the Opposition
Isaac Sileku	Democratic Alliance	Minister for Mobility
Tertuis Simmers	Democratic Alliance	Minister for Infrastructure
Donna Stephens	Patriotic Alliance	
Beauty Stoffel	African National Congress	
Benedicta van Minnen	Democratic Alliance	
Leon van Wyk	Democratic Alliance	
Thomas Walters	Democratic Alliance	
Mireille Wenger	Democratic Alliance	Minister for Health and Wellness
Dirk Wessels	Democratic Alliance	
Alan Winde	Democratic Alliance	Premier
Rachel Windvogel	African National Congress	

== See also ==
- List of members of the 6th Western Cape Provincial Parliament
- List of members of the 5th Western Cape Provincial Parliament
