= Peter de Villiers =

South African rugby union player & coach

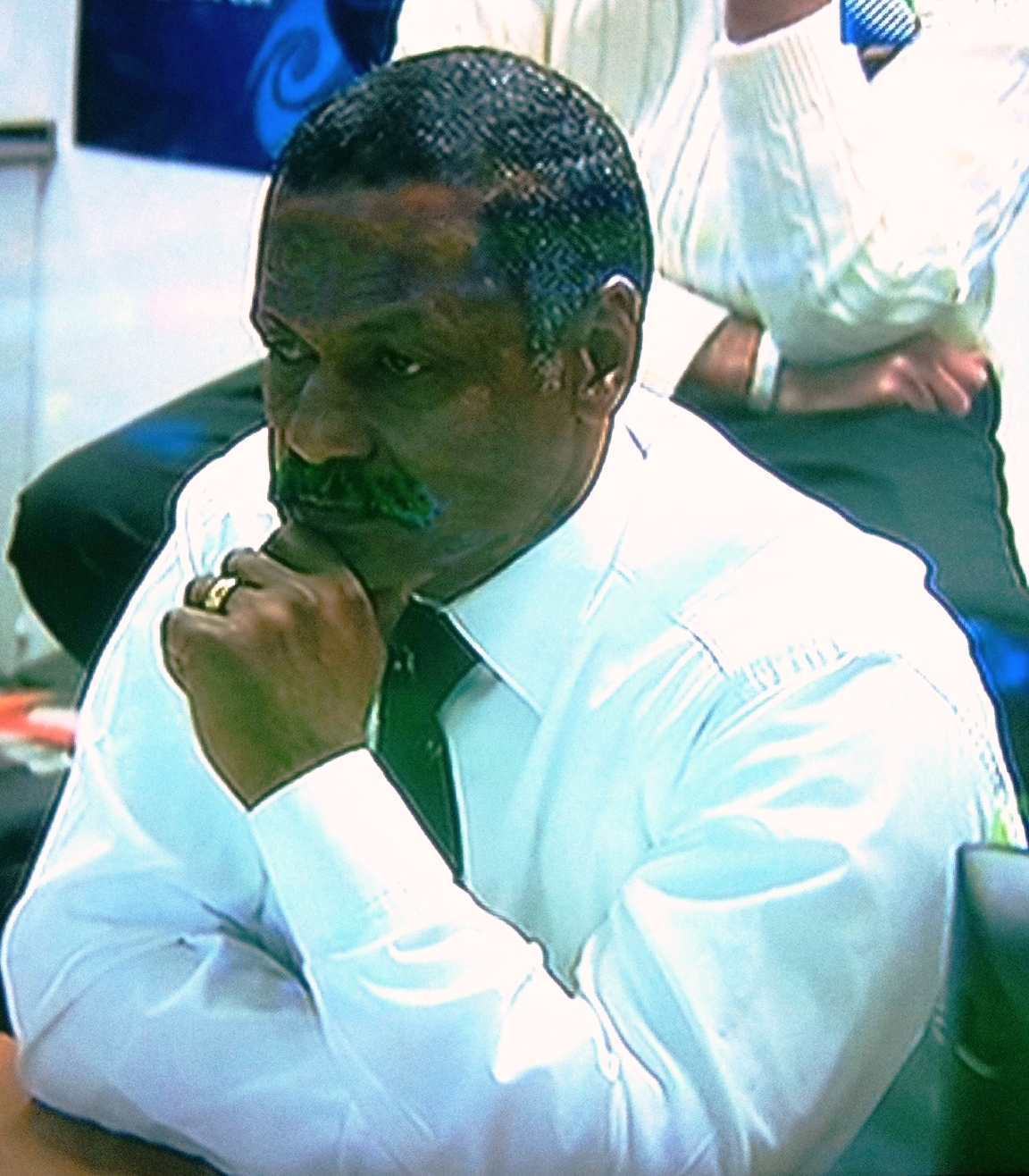
- De Villiers in 2011

Member of the Western Cape Provincial Parliament
- In office 23 May 2023 – 24 March 2024

Member of the Drakenstein Municipal Council
- In office January 2023 – May 2023
- In office November 2021 – June 2022

Personal details
- Born: 3 June 1957 (age 69) Paarl, South Africa
- Party: Good
- Spouse(s): Theresa de Villiers (died 2022)
- Occupation: Rugby coach; politician; former teacher
- Height: 1.65 m (5 ft 5 in)
- Weight: 70 kg (11 st 0 lb; 154 lb)
- School: Noorder Paarl High
- University: Perseverance College, Hewitt College

Rugby union career
Coaching career
- Years: Team
- 1998-2001: Western Province (assistant coach)
- 1998-2000: South Africa under-19
- 2002-2003: Valke
- 2004-2006: South Africa under-21
- 2007-2008: Emerging Springboks
- 2008–2011: South Africa
- 2012-2015: University of the Western Cape (Director of Rugby)
- 2018-2019: Zimbabwe
- 2020-2021: Eastern Province Elephants

Peter de Villiers (born 3 June 1957) is a South African professional rugby union coach and former Good Party politician. He was coach of the South Africa national rugby union team from 2008 to 2011, after successes with the South African U19 and U21 squads, and the first-ever non-white to be appointed to the position.

He enjoyed mixed successes. He initially managed South Africa to success, winning the 2009 Tri Nations, a 2009 test series win over the British & Irish Lions and a first victory over New Zealand in Dunedin in 2009. However he also became known for his controversial off-field comments. South Africa finished bottom in the 2010 and 2011 Tri Nations, and following a quarter final defeat to Australia in the 2011 Rugby World Cup did not renew his contract.

On 12 September 2021, De Villiers was announced as the Good Party's mayoral candidate for the Drakenstein Local Municipality ahead of the municipal elections scheduled for 1 November. The party won four seats in council and De Villiers took up one of the seats. He resigned from council in June 2022, only to return to council in January 2023 again. He was sworn in as a Good Member of the Western Cape Provincial Parliament in May 2023. In March 2024, Good announced his expulsion from the party and subsequent loss of membership in the Western Cape Provincial Parliament. He was replaced by Suzette Little.

== Playing and early coaching career ==
He played scrum-half during the apartheid era.

He coached amateur club Tygerberg in 1996 and 1997, and the Western Province Disas in 1997. In 1998, he enjoyed his first major appointments as assistant coach for Western Province in the Currie Cup and also the South Africa national under-19 side, which he took to third in the 1999 Under 19 Rugby World Championship. He took the Falcons through the 2002 and 2003 Currie Cup campaigns before going on to coach the South Africa national under-21 rugby union team between 2004 and 2006. In the 2004 Under 21 Rugby World Championship, South Africa finished third, but won in 2005 and came second in 2006. In 2007, De Villiers was appointed coach of the Emerging Springboks and led them to the title of the 2007 Nations Cup.

== Springboks ==
Following the acrimonious conclusion of Jake White's tenure as Springbok coach, after South Africa's Rugby World Cup victory in France in November 2007, De Villiers was short-listed for the role along with three other candidates, including successful Bulls coach Heyneke Meyer. Cheeky Watson, Neil de Beer and Koos Rossouw were the people that were driving his campaign for election with Koos Rossouw being the major funder. In January 2008, De Villiers was appointed as the first ever black coach of the Springboks, but South African Rugby Union (SARU) President Oregan Hoskins indicated that his rugby credentials were not the sole motivation for the appointment: "We have made the appointment and taken into account the issue of transformation when we made it. I don't think that tarnishes Peter; I'm just being honest with our country."

The appointment was not met with universal acclaim. "We have seven lean years ahead," predicted former Springbok captain Corné Krige. De Villiers achieved an early fillip, however, in convincing John Smit to stay on as Springbok captain, but there followed a period of jaundice as Gert Smal and Eugene Eloff refused to be considered as his assistants. Going into February, De Villiers's contract, offering him R200,000 less than his predecessor, was still unsigned. Contractual negotiations broke down in March when he insisted on the final word on team selection. When SARU amended its constitution later that month, De Villiers finally gave his signature.

The Springboks' first training squad under De Villiers, comprising 42 players, included sixteen of colour. Dick Muir and Gary Gold were named assistant coaches shortly thereafter. Controversy arose again, however, when Ricky Januarie was dropped for "disciplinary reasons". Going into the Tri Nations, De Villiers's 28-man squad included ten of colour and took two victories against Wales (43–17 and 37–21) and one against Italy (26–0) in Incoming Tours.

Following the Springboks' 19–8 defeat at the hands of the All Blacks, De Villiers accused them of cheating. Several months later, in an interview with SA Sports Illustrated, he declared,

I know the game. Technically, I'm very strong. When I said the All Blacks were cheaters in the first Test in Wellington, I picked up some of the technical stuff they did wrong in the scrums and how they played outside of the laws and how they used that to good effect. I also picked up that, instead of standing a metre apart in the line-outs, they stood a metre and a half apart so that we couldn't compete; and anything outside of any law is cheating.

The side lost again, 16–9, to Australia not long after, but this time De Villiers cast no doubt over the probity of his opponents. In the after match interview De Villiers claimed there was a lot he could learn from the Australian team. He subsequently took his team to a historic triumph in Dunedin, trumping the All Blacks 30–28 before thrashing Argentina with nine tries in a score of 63–9.

In April 2009 he expressed shock that the captains of England, Scotland and Wales had been left out of the Lions squad for the 2009 British & Irish Lions tour to South Africa. On 27 June 2009, after South Africa had defeated the Lions in the 2nd Test of the Series, de Villiers attracted criticism when he defended his blindside flanker, Schalk Burger, against charges of eye gouging, despite clear television evidence showing the offence had occurred. De Villiers said "I don't think it should have been a card at all. For me and for everybody, this is sport.". Even after Burger received an 8-week suspension from the IRB on 29 June, De Villers continued to defend him, saying "I have watched the television footage, and am still convinced that nothing he did was on purpose. He is an honourable man – he never meant to go to anyone's eye". However, later the same day, after a meeting with SARU, he apologised, saying "It was never my intention to suggest that I condone foul play. That is the last thing I would ever do and I apologise for that impression." His belated apology did not bring an end to the controversy, with numerous figures in International rugby continuing to criticise him, including Lions player Brian O'Driscoll, who said "To hear the South Africa coach talk about gouging being part of the game was semi-repulsive", and "regardless of the apology he may have submitted – it's essentially bringing the game into disrepute".

Following an 11–9 defeat to Australia in the Rugby World Cup quarter-final, De Villiers confirmed that he would not resign, rather he would see out the rest of his contract that expired in December 2011 and he would not be signing a new deal. He said, "I enjoyed it. I was in a privileged position to be able to contribute to my country. South African rugby is in a good state and will move forward after this."

=== Comments and controversy ===
De Villiers is known for his rather colourful comments, which have landed him in hot water on many occasions.

One of his more controversial comments featured a decidedly racial overtone. In June 2009 shortly after the first test between the Springboks and the British & Irish Lions at Loftus Versveld in Pretoria, De Villiers was quoted as saying:

What I've learned in South Africa is that if you take your car to a garage where the owner is a black man and he messes up then you'll never go back to that garage again. If the owner's a white man you say, 'ah, he made a mistake', and you go back.

In June 2009, shortly after the second test between the Boks and the Lions, flanker Schalk Burger received an eight-week ban for eye-gouging Lions wing Luke Fitzgerald. De Villiers responded to the incident by reminding the press that "rugby is a contact sport, and so is dancing". He went on further by saying:

Why don't we go to the nearest ballet shop, get some tutus and get a dancing shop going? (Then there will be) no eye-gouging, no tackling, no nothing and we will enjoy it!

De Villiers' remarks eventually culminated in a rebuke by South African Minister of Sport, Makhenkesi Stofile, who told De Villiers to "keep his mouth shut" and "sober-up".

In the 2011 Rugby World Cup year, De Villiers received much criticism especially from New Zealanders over comments he made about Super Rugby debutant Sonny Bill Williams, in which he described his offloading oriented game as "nonsense" and a bad example for rugby playing children, who were wasting their time seeking to imitate it.

Springbok prop Tendai "Beast" Mtawarira has questioned whether former national coach Peter de Villiers was competent for the role he occupied between 2008 and 2011. Mtawarira, who made his Springbok debut under De Villiers' guidance in 2008, made the revelation in his new autobiography, Beast.

"He was a fantastic coach of the Junior Springboks, but I think at the high level he was probably lucky that a very good group of players was handed over to him," Mtawarira writes in the book.

Mtawarira was referring to the fact that De Villiers had inherited Jake White's 2007 World Cup winning team with senior players like Victor Matfield, Fourie du Preez, Schalk Burger, John Smit, Bakkies Botha, Danie Rossouw, Jean de Villiers, Jaque Fourie, Bryan Habana and JP Pietersen ruling the roost.

Mtawarira added: "His methods and approach didn't really work with the Springboks, and as players we had to be careful what we said to the media. What you said would get back to Peter and affect your place in the team. The media did not like Peter and thought he was a bit of a clown. "There's no doubt that he was happy to be at the forefront of a team that could operate on its own steam. Most of the work was done by the players, with (assistant coaches) Dick (Muir) and (Gary) Gold very influential."

During the 2019 Rugby World Cup tournament in Japan De Villiers publicly announced that he no longer supported the Springbok rugby team because of the inclusion of Eben Etzebeth, who was accused of racist remarks before the start of the tournament. The remarks backfired on De Villiers and he tried, in vain, to explain his remarks. South African supporters demanded that he no longer parade in the Springbok blazer, which he wears on all promotional photos, since he no longer supports the team. After Springboks won the Rugby World Cup trophy, beating England 32–12 in the final, he tried to quell the stormy waters by congratulating the Springboks on their win. It is believed to have had a serious effect on his "master classes" which he offered to would-be rugby coaches.

=== Record as Springbok coach ===
The Springboks won 30 of their 48 matches under the helm of De Villiers. The 62.5% win percentage includes a 47% win percentage against the All Blacks, having played them 11 times and losing 6 matches, one of which was 40–7, a record defeat at the time. De Villiers is the first Springbok coach since Nick Mallet to have a 100% win record over the All Blacks in a single year (2009). De Villiers is also the first coach since Nelie Smith to have secured a series win over the British & Irish Lions.

== Zimbabwe ==
De Villiers was hired by Zimbabwe on a two-year contract in February 2018 for a reported R115 000 per month salary, with the aim of getting the country back to the Rugby World Cup for the first time since 1991. Not only did Zimbabwe fail to make the 2019 World Cup, they were nearly relegated from Africa's top-tier competition, and de Villiers was fired in May 2019.

== Politics ==
=== 2021 Drakenstein mayoral candidacy ===
On 12 August 2021, he was announced as Good's candidate for mayor of the Drakenstein Local Municipality in the local government elections scheduled for 1 November 2021. The municipality's seat is his hometown of Paarl. The party won four seats in council as the DA retained control of the municipality. De Villiers took up a seat on the council after the election. De Villiers resigned from the council in June 2022, two months after his wife's passing to spend more time with his family. He remained a party member. Nonetheless, de Villiers was nominated to return to the Drakenstein council after councillor Edgar Arendse's party membership was terminated in January 2023.

=== Western Cape Provincial Parliament ===
On 22 May 2023, the Good party announced that de Villiers would be taking up the party's sole seat in the Western Cape Provincial Parliament after ex-MPP Shaun August was expelled from the party. He was sworn in the following day.

On 2 February 2024, Good suspended de Villiers from all party activities after receiving a sexual misconduct complaint from a party member. On 25 March 2024, he was expelled from the party and replaced with Suzette Little in the Provincial Parliament.

=== MK ===
In January 2025, de Villiers joined uMkhonto weSizwe (MK).

Sporting positions
Preceded by (South Africa) Jake White	South Africa National Rugby Union Coach; 2008–11	Succeeded by (South Africa) Heyneke Meyer
