= Maxime Médard =

France international rugby union player

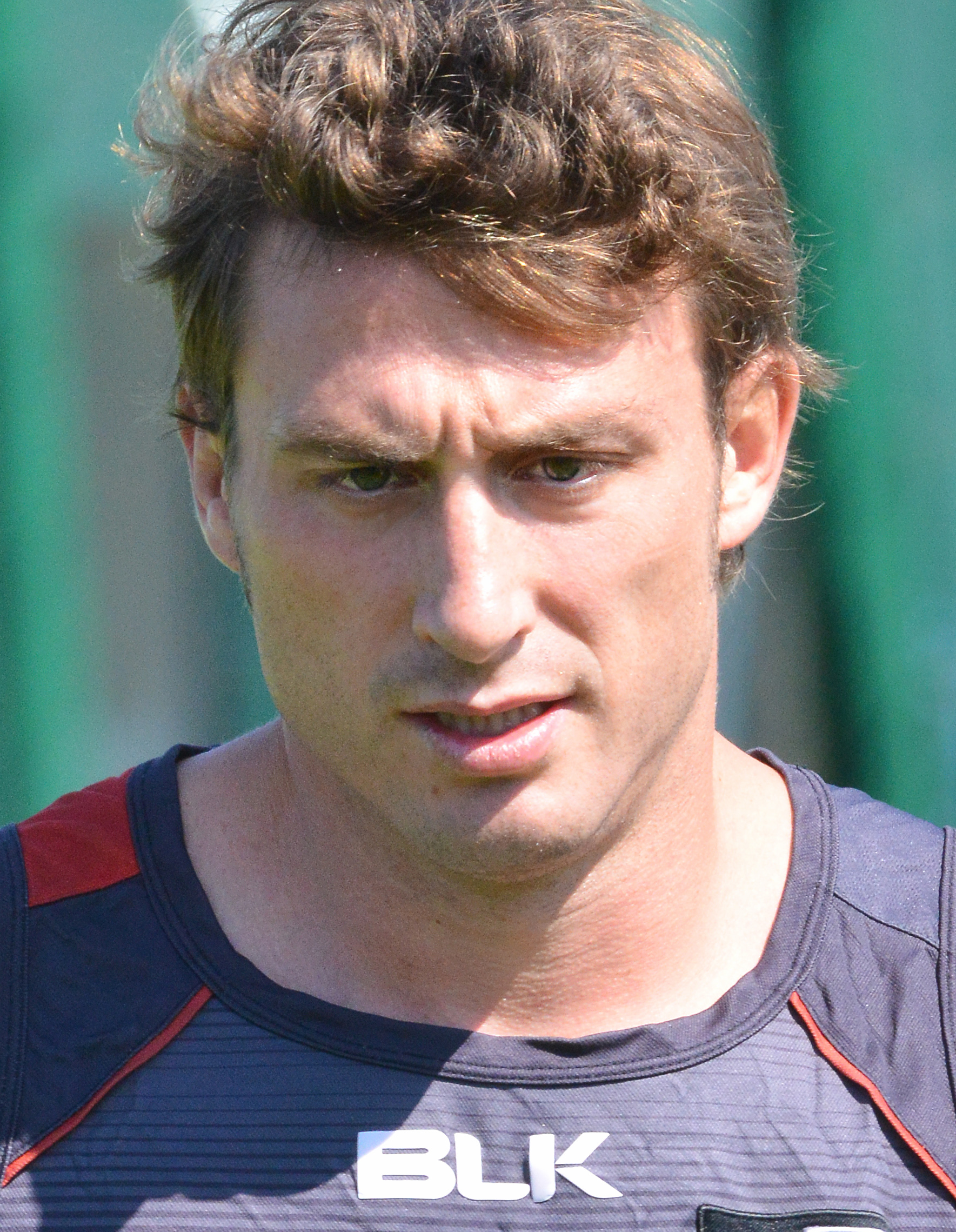
- Born: 16 November 1986 (age 39) Toulouse, France
- Height: 1.80 m (5 ft 11 in)
- Weight: 89 kg (14 st 0 lb; 196 lb)

Rugby union career
- Position(s): Full-back, Wing, Centre
Youth career
- 1995–2000: Blagnac
- 2000–2004: Toulouse
Senior career
| Years | Team | Apps | (Points) |
| 2004–2022 | Toulouse | 367 | (570) |
- Correct as of 10 June 2022
International career
| Years | Team | Apps | (Points) |
| 2008–2019 | France | 63 | (73) |
- Correct as of 20 October 2019
Medal record
Men's Rugby union
Representing France
Rugby World Cup
| Silver medal – second place | 2011 New Zealand | Squad |

Maxime Médard (born 16 November 1986) is a former French rugby union player who played his club rugby for French club Stade Toulousain in Top 14 and France internationally. He can play as both a full-back and on the wing and is described by assistant national team coach Émile Ntamack as an "incredible talent" that, during the 2010–11 season, was finally "realizing his potential". Medard is a two-time winner of the Heineken Cup and, in 2008, won the Top 14 for the first time. Also referred to as 'The French Wolverine.'

== Career ==
=== Club ===
Médard began his rugby union career playing for local club Blagnac as a youth. His father, Alain, had previously played for the club in the 1980s alongside his uncle Francis. In 2000, he joined Stade Toulousain and spent four years developing. Médard achieved numerous honours as a youth winning the Gaudermen Challenge in three straight years from 2001 to 2003. In 2004, he made his debut with the senior team and, in the following year, turned professional. In his first year as a professional, Médard was a member of the Toulousain team that won the 2004–05 Heineken Cup. Toulouse defeated league rivals Stade Français 18–12 in the final match, though Médard was not part of the team that won the final. Médard burst onto the scene domestically in the 2007–08 season primarily due to injuries to Vincent Clerc and Clément Poitrenaud. He featured regularly in the team that won the Top 14 that season. For his efforts, he was declared the Revelation of the Year by National Rugby League (France) (LNR). He started the 2010 Heineken Cup Final as Toulouse defeated Biarritz. On 5 September 2010, Médard scored the fastest try in league history since 2005 after scoring after 18 seconds against La Rochelle.

=== International ===
Prior to playing for the senior team, Médard was a regular international at youth level. In 2005, he was a member of the under-21 team that played at the 2005 Under 21 Rugby World Championship in Argentina. In the ensuing season, Médard won the 2006 edition of the competition that was played on home soil. He earned his first senior cap France in November 2008 during a test series match against Argentina. He appeared in subsequent test matches against the Pacific Islanders and the All Blacks. Médard's positive play within the team resulted in the player earning selection to the team that participated in the 2009 Six Nations Championship. In June 2009, Médard scored the late try that sealed France's first victory over the All Blacks in New Zealand since 1994.

Médard announced his retirement from rugby in 2022.

== International tries ==
| # | Date | Venue | Opponent | Result (France-...) | Competition |
|---|---|---|---|---|---|
| 1. | 15 November 2008 | Stade Bonal, Sochaux, France | Pacific Islanders | 42–17 | Test Match |
| 2. | 7 February 2009 | Croke Park, Dublin, Ireland | Ireland | 21–30 | Six Nations Championship |
| 3. | 21 March 2009 | Stadio Flaminio, Rome, Italy | Italy | 50–8 | Six Nations Championship |
| 4. | 21 March 2009 | Stadio Flaminio, Rome, Italy | Italy | 50–8 | Six Nations Championship |
| 5. | 13 June 2009 | Carisbrook, Dunedin, New Zealand | New Zealand | 27–22 | Test Match |
| 6. | 13 November 2010 | Stade de la Beaujoire, Nantes, France | Fiji | 34–12 | Test Match |
| 7. | 5 February 2011 | Stade de France, Saint-Denis, France | Scotland | 34–21 | Six Nations Championship |
| 8. | 13 February 2011 | Aviva Stadium, Dublin, Ireland | Ireland | 25–22 | Six Nations Championship |
| 9. | 8 October 2011 | Eden Park, Auckland, New Zealand | England | 19–12 | 2011 Rugby World Cup |
| 10. | 26 February 2012 | Murrayfield Stadium, Edinburgh, Scotland | Scotland | 23–17 | Six Nations Championship |
| 11. | 16 March 2013 | Stade de France, Saint-Denis, France | Scotland | 23–16 | Six Nations Championship |
| 12. | 13 February 2016 | Stade de France, Saint-Denis, France | Ireland | 10–9 | Six Nations Championship |
| 13. | 17 August 2019 | Allianz Riviera, Nice, France | Scotland | 32–3 | Rugby World Cup warm-up matches |
| 14. | 17 August 2019 | Allianz Riviera, Nice, France | Scotland | 32–3 | Rugby World Cup warm-up matches |

== Honours ==
=== Club ===
(France) Stade Toulousain

- Top 14: 2007–08, 2010–11, 2011–12, 2018–19, 2020–21
- Heineken Cup: 2005, 2010, 2021

=== International ===
France

- Under 21 Rugby World Championship: 2006
