= Sol Plaatje Local Municipality elections =

The Sol Plaatje Local Municipality council consists of sixty-five members elected by mixed-member proportional representation. Thirty-three councillors are elected by first-past-the-post voting in thirty-three wards, while the remaining thirty-two are chosen from party lists so that the total number of party representatives is proportional to the number of votes received. In the election of 1 November 2021 the African National Congress (ANC) won a majority of thirty-three seats

== Results ==
The following table shows the composition of the council after past elections.

Event	ACDP	ANC	COPE	DA	EFF	FF+	Other	Total
2000 election	—	38	—	14	—	—	1	53
2006 election	1	40	—	10	—	0	4	55
2011 election	1	40	5	16	—	—	0	62
2016 election	0	38	1	19	5	1	1	65
2021 election	1	33	0	14	6	3	8	65

== December 2000 election ==
The following table shows the results of the 2000 election.

Party	Ward			List			Total seats
Party	Votes	%	Seats	Votes	%	Seats	Total seats
African National Congress	39,239	70.83	19	40,034	71.96	19	38
Democratic Alliance	15,035	27.14	8	14,772	26.55	6	14
Independent candidates	713	1.29	0				0
Inkatha Freedom Party	227	0.41	0	445	0.80	1	1
United Democratic Movement	187	0.34	0	381	0.68	0	0
Total	55,401	100.00	27	55,632	100.00	26	53
Valid votes	55,401	97.21		55,632	97.54		
Invalid/blank votes	1,588	2.79		1,403	2.46		
Total votes	56,989	100.00		57,035	100.00		
Registered voters/turnout	97,281	58.58		97,281	58.63		

== March 2006 election ==
The following table shows the results of the 2006 election.

Party	Ward			List			Total seats
Party	Votes	%	Seats	Votes	%	Seats	Total seats
African National Congress	40,439	72.49	23	40,321	73.60	17	40
Democratic Alliance	9,697	17.38	4	9,526	17.39	6	10
Independent Democrats	1,770	3.17	0	1,826	3.33	2	2
African Christian Democratic Party	1,396	2.50	0	1,330	2.43	1	1
Azanian People's Organisation	643	1.15	0	655	1.20	1	1
Independent candidates	1,136	2.04	1				1
Freedom Front Plus	397	0.71	0	525	0.96	0	0
Inkatha Freedom Party	179	0.32	0	252	0.46	0	0
United Independent Front	33	0.06	0	243	0.44	0	0
Federation of Democrats	98	0.18	0	108	0.20	0	0
Total	55,788	100.00	28	54,786	100.00	27	55
Valid votes	55,788	98.38		54,786	96.54		
Invalid/blank votes	916	1.62		1,965	3.46		
Total votes	56,704	100.00		56,751	100.00		
Registered voters/turnout	111,413	50.90		111,413	50.94		

== May 2011 election ==
The following table shows the results of the 2011 election.

Party	Ward			List			Total seats
Party	Votes	%	Seats	Votes	%	Seats	Total seats
African National Congress	46,379	62.98	22	47,505	63.97	18	40
Democratic Alliance	19,497	26.47	9	19,447	26.19	7	16
Congress of the People	5,821	7.90	0	5,556	7.48	5	5
African Christian Democratic Party	980	1.33	0	848	1.14	1	1
Azanian People's Organisation	380	0.52	0	586	0.79	0	0
Pan Africanist Congress of Azania	349	0.47	0	321	0.43	0	0
Independent candidates	239	0.32	0				0
Total	73,645	100.00	31	74,263	100.00	31	62
Valid votes	73,645	98.29		74,263	98.52		
Invalid/blank votes	1,282	1.71		1,114	1.48		
Total votes	74,927	100.00		75,377	100.00		
Registered voters/turnout	121,367	61.74		121,367	62.11		

== August 2016 election ==
The following table shows the results of the 2016 election.

Party	Ward			List			Total seats
Party	Votes	%	Seats	Votes	%	Seats	Total seats
African National Congress	44,158	57.05	21	44,757	58.41	17	38
Democratic Alliance	22,406	28.95	11	23,128	30.18	8	19
Economic Freedom Fighters	5,728	7.40	0	5,805	7.58	5	5
Congress of the People	1,191	1.54	0	1,178	1.54	1	1
Independent candidates	2,357	3.05	1				1
Freedom Front Plus	859	1.11	0	896	1.17	1	1
African Christian Democratic Party	512	0.66	0	525	0.69	0	0
Azanian People's Organisation	192	0.25	0	336	0.44	0	0
Total	77,403	100.00	33	76,625	100.00	32	65
Valid votes	77,403	98.82		76,625	98.74		
Invalid/blank votes	921	1.18		980	1.26		
Total votes	78,324	100.00		77,605	100.00		
Registered voters/turnout	130,318	60.10		130,318	59.55		

== November 2021 election ==
The following table shows the results of the 2021 election.

Party	Ward			List			Total seats
Party	Votes	%	Seats	Votes	%	Seats	Total seats
African National Congress	30,837	49.83	27	30,913	50.48	6	33
Democratic Alliance	12,591	20.35	6	12,702	20.74	8	14
Economic Freedom Fighters	5,600	9.05	0	5,994	9.79	6	6
Sol- Plaatjie Service Delivery Forum	2,645	4.27	0	2,923	4.77	3	3
Patriotic Alliance	2,577	4.16	0	2,834	4.63	3	3
Freedom Front Plus	2,243	3.62	0	2,096	3.42	3	3
Good	2,092	3.38	0	2,099	3.43	2	2
Independent candidates	1,648	2.66	0				0
African Christian Democratic Party	570	0.92	0	456	0.74	1	1
Congress of the People	183	0.30	0	394	0.64	0	0
Azanian People's Organisation	274	0.44	0	269	0.44	0	0
African Transformation Movement	234	0.38	0	251	0.41	0	0
Africa's New Dawn	135	0.22	0	147	0.24	0	0
Spectrum National Party	129	0.21	0	91	0.15	0	0
Economic Emancipation Forum	121	0.20	0	64	0.10	0	0
Total	61,879	100.00	33	61,233	100.00	32	65
Valid votes	61,879	98.56		61,233	98.24		
Invalid/blank votes	907	1.44		1,097	1.76		
Total votes	62,786	100.00		62,330	100.00		
Registered voters/turnout	128,236	48.96		128,236	48.61		

=== By-elections from November 2021 ===
The following by-elections were held to fill vacant ward seats in the period from November 2021. In ward 21, the DA candidate had their party membership terminated after switching to ActionSA, and in the by-election held on 31 August 2022, the DA candidate retained the seat for the party.

Date	Ward	Party of the previous councillor	Party of the newly elected councillor
31 August 2022	21	Democratic Alliance	Democratic Alliance
22 February 2023	1	African National Congress	African National Congress
11 October 2023	1	African National Congress	Patriotic Alliance
23 Jul 2025	1	Patriotic Alliance	African National Congress

In ward 1, the ANC councillor died. In the resulting by-election in February 2023, Ferguson Moses retained the seat for the party, which had taken the seat from the Democratic Alliance (DA) in 2021. The Patriotic Alliance (PA) gained significant support to finish in third place.

Moses defected to the Patriotic Alliance, resulting in a by-election held in October 2023. He retained the seat, the first by-election win in the Northern Cape for the PA. The DA candidate defected to the PA after nominations had closed, the third candidate to move from the DA to the PA in 2023. The election also saw the by-election debut of Build One South Africa, whose candidate received 1% of the vote.

As a result of the October 2023 by-election, the ANC lost its majority in the municipality and formed a governing coalition with Good. The party reclaimed the seat in July 2025.
