= Unite for Change =

- Leader: Collective leadership
- Governing body: Leaders' Council
- Founder: Patricia de Lille; Songezo Zibi; Mmusi Maimane
- Founded: 5 October 2025; 8 months ago
- Merger of: Rise Mzansi; Build One South Africa; Good
- Political position: Centre

Website
- www.uniteforchangesa.org

Unite for Change is a South African political party that was launched on 5 October 2025 in Johannesburg, South Africa. It is the merger of three political parties, namely Rise Mzansi, Good and Build One South Africa. The party was intended to be registered to contest the upcoming municipal elections in 2026. The party is broadly centrist on the left–right political spectrum.

Members of the party's Leaders' Council include Build One South Africa leader Mmusi Maimane, Good party leader Patricia de Lille, BOSA MP Nobuntu Hlazo-Webster, Rise Mzansi leader Songezo Zibi, Rise Mzansi Member of the Gauteng Provincial Legislature and Member of the Executive Council Vuyiswa Ramokgopa, and Good Secretary-General and Member of the Western Cape Provincial Parliament Brett Herron.

== Merger on hold ==
In April 2026, the three parties agreed to put the merger on hold, stating that "it cannot be implemented effectively under the pressure of an election campaign. As a result, the parties have determined that the best option is to contest the 2026 local government elections individually and pursue consolidation afterward".
