= Rise Mzansi =

Political party in South Africa

- Abbreviation: RISE
- Leader: Songezo Zibi
- Chairperson: Vuyiswa Ramokgopa
- Spokesperson: Gugu Ndima
- Chief Organiser: Makashule Gana
- Head of Policy: Mandla Isaacs
- Deputy Chairperson: Cilna Steyn
- Founder: Songezo Zibi
- Founded: 19 April 2023; 3 years ago
- Ideology: Neoliberalism
- Political position: Centre
- National Assembly: 2 / 400
- National Council of Provinces: 0 / 90
- Pan-African Parliament: 0 / 5 (South African seats)
- Provincial Legislatures: 1 / 487

Website
- www.risemzansi.org

Rise Mzansi (RISE) is a South African political party founded in April 2023. It is led by Songezo Zibi, a former newspaper editor and co-founder of the Rivonia Circle think tank. The party characterises their ideology as social democratic but has been defined elsewhere as neoliberal.

== Formation ==
Rise Mzansi was launched on 19 April 2023 at Constitution Hill in Johannesburg. Songezo Zibi was named as party leader. Zibi is former associate editor of the Financial Mail and former editor of Business Day as well as the Rivonia Circle think tank co-founder. The party's national leadership includes former Democratic Alliance public representative Makashule Gana, former anti-apartheid activist Ishmael Mkhabela, Mandla Isaacs former speechwriter for Minister Malusi Gigaba, and Nick Binedell, founder of the GIBS business school. The party contested the 2024 general elections with Zibi as the party's presidential candidate.

In August 2023, Member of Parliament Nomsa Marchesi resigned from the Democratic Alliance and joined Rise Mzansi as the party's Free State convenor. In November 2023, student leader David Kabwa's party, MOVE SA, announced that it would contest the 2024 elections under the banner of Rise Mzansi. In January 2024, Khume Ramulifho, another former member of the DA joined the party.

== Politics ==
Rise Mzansi's leader, Songezo Zibi, has described himself as a social democrat and used to give other politicians copies of the book The Third Man, a memoir by Peter Mandelson that documents and advocates third way politics as implemented by New Labour in the UK. He has also written in support of the third way.

Zibi describes Rise Mzansi as a "typical European centrist party." The party has been described by commentators as "leaning towards social democracy" or as neoliberal with social democratic rhetoric.

The party's manifesto for the 2024 election has been described as focused on professionalising the government of South Africa and reducing corruption.

According to their website, they stand for the following principles:

- "A constitutional democracy, where the constitution is the supreme law.
- A government based on the will of the people and elected by the people.
- Free, fair and regular elections that are run independently.
- South African people enjoying their freedoms without the fear of criminals.
- All South Africans having access to quality basic services and opportunities to live a better life.
- Public representatives who serve the people and are accountable, ethical and do their duty with care."

== 2024 campaign ==
Rise Mzansi's campaign slogan for the general elections was "2024 Is Our 1994", in reference to South Africa's first democratic elections. In April 2023, Rise Mzansi rejected calls to join the Democratic Alliance-initiated "Moonshot Pact" (later Multi-Party Charter) of opposition parties on the grounds that the pact is solely based on removing the ANC and keeping the EFF from national power. Rather than forming itself only around opposing the ANC, Rise Mzansi says it is focused on developing substantive alternative politics and policies.

The party's head of strategic communications was Mark Gevisser, who disclosed this after the elections in October 2024.

In the 2024 general election, Rise Mzansi won two seats in the Parliament (National Assembly) with 0,42% of the vote.

In June 2024, Rise joined the Government of National Unity (GNU), but was not allocated any positions in the Cabinet, nor any deputy ministers. However, its leader, Songezo Zibi, was appointed as chairperson of the Standing Committee on Public Accounts in the National Assembly.

== Funders ==
Rise Mzansi was the subject of public controversy due to the apparently large amount of funding it possessed in the absence of any declaration of its funding sources, which led to allegations that it might be funded by a foreign government. Party leaders were evasive when answering questions and initially claimed that the party "is only funded by ordinary South Africans".

The IEC released donor information for the period 1 October to 31 December 2023 showing that Rise Mzansi raised R16.7 million: more than any other party during that period. Of this amount, R15million came from a single donor: billionaire Rebecca Oppenheimer, daughter of apartheid mining magnate Nicky Oppenheimer. The party subsequently received significant criticism for this, with leader of the opposition EFF party Julius Malema saying:

“How can you give Rise Mzansi so many millions even when they don’t have a track record of being a legitimate political party? Let us unite black people to fight against the Oppenheimer money. Let us not be bought by the Oppenheimers.”

In the IEC's release of donor information for the first quarter of 2024, immediately before the elections, it was revealed that the party had received a further R33,895,000. Again, R15million of this came from Rebecca Oppenheimer. Another R15million came from an unknown, recently registered non-profit organisation called 'We Are The People', leading to further controversy. The third largest donor was The Tempyr Trust, an anonymous trust registered in Luxembourg.

== Collaboration with Good ==
In August 2024, Axolile Notywala, the party's candidate for Premier of the Western Cape during the 2024 Western Cape provincial election, was appointed by Good to fill a vacancy in the City of Cape Town council. Rise Mzansi stated that the arrangement "cements the two parties' commitment to revive conversations about realigning social democratic politics" and did not rule out the possibility of a merger, while Good's Brett Herron said that "we are confident that this is only the beginning of a much broader and richer project".

== Merger ==
On 5 October 2025, it was announced that Rise Mzansi would be merging with two other ideologically-similar political parties, Good and Build One South Africa, to form Unite for Change, which was intended to contest the 2026 local government elections. Rise Mzansi will fully merge with the newly formed political party at the next general election.

The merger was put on hold in April 2026, with the three parties stating that "it cannot be implemented effectively under the pressure of an election campaign. As a result, the parties have determined that the best option is to contest the 2026 local government elections individually and pursue consolidation afterward".

== Election results ==
=== National Assembly elections ===
Election	Party leader	Total votes	Share of vote	Seats	+/–	Government
2024	Songezo Zibi	67,975	0.42% (Note: From 2024, seats in the National Assembly are determined by a combination of the national ballot, and the nine regional ballots. Only the national ballot figures are shown here.)	2 / 400	▲2	ANC–DA–IFP–PA–GOOD–PAC–VF+–UDM–RISE-ALJ coalition government

=== National Council of Provinces elections ===
Election	Total # of seats won	+/–	Government
2024	0 / 90	New	Extra-parliamentary

=== Provincial elections ===
Election	Eastern Cape		Free State		Gauteng		Kwazulu-Natal		Limpopo		Mpumalanga		North-West		Northern Cape		Western Cape	
Election	%	Seats	%	Seats	%	Seats	%	Seats	%	Seats	%	Seats	%	Seats	%	Seats	%	Seats
2024	0.29	0/73	0.28	0/30	0.98	1/80	0.11	0/80	0.15	0/64	0.19	0/51	0.36	0/38	0.16	0/30	0.51	0/42
