= Bazil Petrus =

South African politician

Bazil Petrus MPP

Member of the Western Cape Provincial Parliament
- Incumbent
- Assumed office 13 June 2024

Executive Mayor of the George Local Municipality
- In office 19 August 2010 – 31 March 2011
- Preceded by: Mercia Draghoender
- Succeeded by: Lionel Esau (acting)
- In office 2004 – 7 March 2008
- Preceded by: Marius Swart
- Succeeded by: Flip de Swart

Personal details
- Born: 15 June 1967 (age 58)
- Party: Patriotic Alliance (2023–present)
- Other political affiliations: Democratic Alliance (2000–2008, 2010–2011, 2020–2023); Good (2019–2020); South African Civics (2016–2019); African National Congress (2011–2016); Independent Democrats (2008–2011); George Gemeenskap Vereeniging (1995–2000)
- Profession: Politician

Bazil Petrus (born 15 June 1967) is a South African politician who has been a Member of the Western Cape Provincial Parliament for the Patriotic Alliance since 2024. Petrus is a veteran politician in the George Local Municipality, having served as executive mayor for two nonconsecutive terms, from 2004 until 2008 and again from 2010 to 2011.

== Political career ==
In 1995, Petrus was elected to the George council as a member of the George Gemeenskap Vereeniging (English: George Community Association). He was elected to the municipal council of the newly established George Local Municipality in 2000 as a member of the Democratic Alliance. He served as mayor of the municipality from 2004 until 7 March 2008, when he was expelled from the party for undermining the party during the 2007 floor-crossing period. He then joined the Independent Democrats, stood as the party's candidate in the subsequent by-election in his old ward and won the seat from the DA.

Petrus was later elected speaker of the municipal council. During a council meeting on 19 August 2010, he resigned as council speaker, while Mercia Draghoender, also from the ID, resigned as mayor; he was subsequently voted in as mayor of the municipality. This development came a few days after the DA and ID announced that they would entering into a pact which would result in merger by 2014. On 28 March 2011, it was revealed that Petrus was on both the DA's and the ANC's candidate lists for the municipal election on 18 May 2011. He ceased to be a councillor for the ID and therefore mayor on 31 March 2011, after having been expelled from the ID. He was elected back to council as an ANC councillor at the election. Petrus later resigned from the ANC and formed his own party, South African Civics, before the 2016 municipal elections. The party won one seat on the municipal council in the election, which Petrus subsequently filled.

Petrus resigned as the sole SAC councillor and defected to the Good party, of which he was appointed regional coordinator, in April 2019. He later left Good and returned to the DA in September 2020. He was then announced as the party's candidate for the by-election in ward 8 on 11 November 2020, which he won.

Petrus was elected to a full term as a ward councillor in the 2021 municipal elections. He was then appointed to mayor Leon van Wyk's mayoral committee as the member responsible for human settlements. Van Wyk conducted a reshuffle of his mayoral committee in October 2023 which saw Petrus removed as a mayoral committee member. Petrus then resigned as a ward councillor in November and later joined the Patriotic Alliance.

Petrus stood as a candidate for the PA on the party's provincial list in the 2024 Western Cape provincial election and was elected to the Western Cape Provincial Parliament. He serves as the leader of the PA's caucus.

== Personal life ==
His daughter, Monique Sambo, died in her sleep on 12 February 2010. His other daughter matriculated in 2025.
