= Axolile Notywala =

South African politician

Personal details
- Party: Rise Mzansi (2023–present), Good (2024–present)
- Profession: Politician

Axolile Notywala is a South African politician and councillor in the City of Cape Town, where he represents Good on behalf of Rise Mzansi.

== Early life and education ==
Prior to his political career, Notywala was a community activist and organiser. He is a lifelong fellow with Atlantic Fellows for Racial Equity, served as board member at the Philippi village project, and acquired leadership certificates from the University of Cape Town and Rutgers University.

He founded Role Models FC, an amateur soccer club based in Khayelitsha that also focused on organising young men to be active against gender-based violence, and co-founded the Movement for Collective Action and Racial Equity, focusing on active citizenship amongst marginalised communities.

== Political career ==
Notywala contested the 2024 Western Cape provincial election as Rise Mzansi's candidate for Premier of the Western Cape and number one on their party list. The party failed to win any seats in the election.

In August 2024, Rise Mzansi and Good announced that Notywala would be filling a vacancy for Good in the City of Cape Town.
