= Donita Stephens =

South African politician and former retail worker

Donita Stephens MPP

Member of the Western Cape Provincial Parliament
- Incumbent
- Assumed office 13 June 2024

Personal details
- Party: Patriotic Alliance
- Profession: Politician

Donita Rosalinda Stephens is a South African politician and former retail worker who was elected to the Western Cape Provincial Parliament in the 2024 provincial election as a member of the Patriotic Alliance.

By 2020, Stephens had worked for the Checkers Hyper in Brackenfell for 30 years. During the COVID-19 pandemic in South Africa, she distributed food hampers in Scottsville, Kraaifontein.
