= Australia national under-21 rugby union team =

The Australian national under-21 rugby union team formerly represented Australia on a national level in age graded rugby union. The team competed at the Under 21 Rugby World Championship, and featured in three championship finals, though they never won the event, losing to South Africa in 2002, New Zealand in 2003 and South Africa again in 2005. Australia finished in fourth place at the final under-21 world championship, held in France in 2006.

In 2008, the International Rugby Board scrapped its under-21 and under-19 world championships in favour of a single under-20 competition, the IRB Junior World Championship. Australia accordingly replaced its under-21 and under-19 sides with a new under-20 side.

== World championship final results ==
Year	Champions	Score	Runners-up	Venue
2002	South Africa	24-21	Australia	Johannesburg, South Africa
2003	New Zealand	21-10	Australia	Oxford, England
2005	South Africa	20-15	Australia	Mendoza, Argentina

== See also ==
- Australia national under-19 rugby union team
- Australia national under-20 rugby union team
