= Makashule Gana =

South African politician

Stanford Makashule Gana

Member of Provincial Legislature in Gauteng
- In office 15 November 2016 – 4 August 2022

Shadow Minister of Human Settlements
- In office 2014–2016
- Leader: Mmusi Maimane
- Preceded by: Stevens Mokgalapa

Personal details
- Born: Tzaneen, Limpopo, South Africa
- Party: Rise Mzansi

Makashule Gana is a South African politician who is the chief organiser for RISE Mzansi. He previously served as a member of the Gauteng Provincial Legislature for the opposition Democratic Alliance. Between 2014 and 2016 he was a member of the National Assembly, where he was Shadow Minister of Human Settlements. Gana also served as the Deputy Federal Chairperson of the DA until 2015. He was previously leader of the DA Youth and a DA councillor in the City of Johannesburg. He holds a BSc degree and is currently registered for a Postgraduate Diploma in Management at the Wits Business School.

== Political career ==
Gana joined the South African Students Congress at the University of Limpopo (then University of the North) in 2000. He joined the Democratic Alliance (DA) and DA Youth in 2002. He was elected Limpopo Provincial Chairperson of the Democratic Alliance Students Organization in 2003. and moved to Johannesburg in 2005, where he continued to be very active in the DA and DA Youth.

Gana was elected Branch Youth Chairperson for the Johannesburg Innercity in 2006 and was soon advanced to the post of DA Youth Chairperson for the Johannesburg Central Constituency in 2007. He participated in the DA Young Leaders programme in 2008, and was elected Gauteng South DA Youth Chairperson in 2008.

Gana became a DA city councillor in June 2009 when he was elected to the Johannesburg Metropolitan Council, and later on, became DA Youth Federal Leader in July 2010. At the 2012 DA Federal Congress, he was elected as one of the three Deputy Federal Chairpersons of the party. As a result of this, he resigned as Youth Leader in May 2013. Mbali Ntuli was appointed as his successor. He was elected to Parliament for the DA in 2014 and served as the Shadow Minister of Human Settlements until November 2016, when he left the National Assembly to fill a DA vacancy in the Gauteng Provincial Legislature. His move was part of a broader strategy to win the province in the 2019 elections.

Gana has been active in campaigning for a national youth subsidy in South Africa, and helped to establish a DA political school with fellow leader Khume Ramulifho in Gauteng’s southern region.

In October 2019, Gana declared his candidacy to succeed Mmusi Maimane as leader of the DA. He faced John Steenhuisen for the position. The election was held on 17 November 2019. Gana lost to Steenhuisen.

He resigned from the DA and as a member of the Gauteng Legislature on 4 August 2022.

In April 2023, Gana was appointed national organiser of social democratic political party RISE Mzansi, under the leadership of Songezo Zibi. In June 2026, Gana was appointed as the chairperson of Parliament's Section 89 Impeachment Committee .
