= Songezo =

Songezo is a South African masculine given name. Notable people with the name include:

- Songezo Jim (born 1990), a South African cyclist
- Songezo Zibi (born 1975), a South African politician and businessman
