= Dirk Wessels =

South African politician

Dirk Wessels MPP

Member of the Western Cape Provincial Parliament
- Incumbent
- Assumed office 13 June 2024

Personal details
- Born: Dirk Johannes Wessels
- Party: Democratic Alliance
- Profession: Politician

Dirk Johannes Wessels is a South African politician who has served as a Democratic Alliance Member of the Western Cape Provincial Parliament since 2024. He previously served as a councillor and member of the mayoral committee in the George Local Municipality.

== Political career ==
In the 2016 municipal elections, Wessels stood as a candidate for the George Local Municipaliy council on the Democratic Alliance proportional representation (PR) list. He was elected to the council.

Wessels was appointed to the municipality's mayoral committee as the member responsible for finance and strategic services by mayor Leon van Wyk in May 2020. Wessels applied to be the DA's mayoral candidate for the municipality in the 2021 local government elections and was reported to be the frontrunner by the local George Herald newspaper. Following the election, Van Wyk was re-elected as mayor and Wessels was reappointed as mayoral committee member for finance. Wessels remained in office after Van Wyk conducted a major reshuffle of his mayoral committee in November 2023.

Wessels was elected to the Western Cape Provincial Parliament in the 2024 provincial election, alongside mayor Van Wyk. He was elected to chair the Standing Committee on Infrastructure unopposed.
