= Brett Herron =

Brett Herron may refer to:

- Brett Herron (rugby union)
- Brett Herron (politician)
