= Suzette Little =

South African politician

Councillor Suzette Little

Member of the Western Cape Provincial Parliament
- In office 25 March 2024 – 28 May 2024
- Preceded by: Peter de Villiers

Personal details
- Born: 5 May 1960 (age 65) Athlone, Cape Town, Cape Province, Union of South Africa
- Party: Good (2018–present)
- Other political affiliations: Democratic Alliance (Until 2018)
- Profession: Politician

Suzette Ann Little (born 5 May 1960) is a South African politician who served as a Member of the Western Cape Provincial Parliament from March until May 2024. A member of the Good party, she currently serves as a councillor in the City of Cape Town, where she is the party's caucus leader.

== Background ==
Little was born on 5 May 1960 in Athlone in Cape Town. She worked in the municipal administration of the City of Cape Town between 2008 and 2010.

== Political career ==
Little joined the Democratic Alliance and stood as the party's candidate in a by-election in Ward 49, which includes Athlone. She won the election on 25 August 2010. She was later appointed as the chair of a sub-council. Little was elected to a full-term as the councillor for ward 49 in the 2011 municipal elections.

Little was appointed as the member of the mayoral committee responsible for social and early childhood development by mayor Patricia de Lille, following Beverly Cortje-Alcock's dismissal in October 2012. In the August 2016 municipal elections, Little was elected back to council, this time on the DA's proportional representation list. De Lille reappointed Little as the MMC responsible for social development and early childhood development, however, she did not remain in the position for long. In January 2017, following the adoption of the city's Organisational Development and Transformation Plan in August 2016, she was appointed as an area-based member of the mayoral committee. The role was described as akin to that of a "mini-mayor" and Little was assigned to the "North" area, which stretched from Hout Bay to Atlantis.

In March 2018, Little resigned as the DA's caucus chair in the City of Cape Town amid infighting. The DA provincial leader, Bonginkosi Madikizela, welcomed her sudden resignation. She came under scrutiny in July 2018 when two staff members of the mayoral committee accused of her misconduct and misuse of resources allocated to her by the city. Little was one of five councillors who resigned from council and the DA in solidarity with De Lille following her farewell address to council in October 2018. In a press conference directly afterwards, they accused the Democratic Alliance of racism. Daily Maverick described the group as "long-time De Lille allies."

Little joined De Lille's new party, Good, and was elected back to council in the 2021 local government elections. She was elected deputy secretary-general of Good at the party's conference in 2023.

In March 2024, Little was sworn in as a Member of the Western Cape Provincial Parliament, filling the casual vacancy that arouse after Peter de Villiers had his party membership following an internal party disciplinary process into sexual misconduct allegations against him. She served in the provincial parliament for a little over two months until the provincial election on 29 May 2024. She was not elected and, instead, returned to the Cape Town City Council on 12 June 2024, where she currently serves as the party's caucus leader.
