= Isaac Sileku =

South African politician (born 1978)

Isaac Sileku MPP

Western Cape Provincial Minister of Mobility
- Incumbent
- Assumed office 13 June 2024
- Premier: Alan Winde
- Preceded by: Ricardo Mackenzie

Member of the Western Cape Provincial Parliament
- Incumbent
- Assumed office 24 November 2022

Permanent Delegate to the National Council of Provinces from the Western Cape
- In office 23 May 2019 – 23 November 2022

Personal details
- Born: Isaac Mbulelo Sileku; 4 August 1978 (age 48)
- Party: Democratic Alliance
- Profession: Politician

Isaac Mbulelo Sileku (born 4 August 1978) is a South African politician who has been the Western Cape's Provincial Minister of Mobility since 2024. A member of the Democratic Alliance, he has been a Member of the Western Cape Provincial Parliament since 2022. Sileku previously served as the Deputy Executive Mayor of the Theewaterskloof Local Municipality from 2016 until 2019 and as a Permanent Delegate to the National Council of Provinces from the Western Cape from 2019 to 2022.

== Early life ==
Sileku grew up in Beaufort West. He was involved in school politics and soon saw himself wanting to become a politician. Sileku later moved to Caledon.

== Political career ==
Sileku joined the Democratic Alliance. In 2011, he was elected a DA councillor in the Theewaterskloof Local Municipality.

After his re-election in 2016, Sileku was elected deputy executive mayor of the municipality.

=== Parliament ===
In 2019 Sileku stood for election to the South African National Assembly as 181st on the DA's national list. He was not elected to the National Assembly. However, the DA selected him to go to the National Council of Provinces, the upper house of parliament. The Western Cape Provincial Parliament elected him as a provincial delegate to the NCOP.

Sileku served on the Select Committee on Cooperative Governance and Traditional Affairs, Water and Sanitation and Human Settlements, the Select Committee on Petitions and Executive Undertakings, the Select Committee on Security and Justice, the Select Committee on Transport, Public Service and Administration, Public Works and Infrastructure, and the Select Committee on Trade and Industry, Economic Development, Small Business Development, Tourism, Employment and Labour.

In 2019 he had a committee attendance rate of 74% and in 2020 it was 88%. Sileku's DA constituency area is the Cape Agulhas.

=== Provincial Parliament ===
In November 2022, Sileku was sworn in as a member of the Western Cape Provincial Parliament after resigning from the NCOP.

Following the 2024 provincial election in which Sileku was elected to a full term in the provincial election, he was appointed as the Provincial Minister of Mobility by premier Alan Winde.
