= Ayanda Bans =

South African politician

Ayanda Bans MPP

Member of the Western Cape Provincial Parliament
- Incumbent
- Assumed office 23 May 2019
- Constituency: Central Karoo

Personal details
- Born: Ayanda Precious Bans
- Party: African National Congress
- Education: University of the Western Cape
- Occupation: Member of the Provincial Parliament
- Profession: Politician

Ayanda Precious Bans is a South African politician serving as a Member of the Western Cape Provincial Parliament since May 2019. She is a member of the African National Congress and represents the Central Karoo constituency.

== Biography ==
Bans was born in Murraysburg in the previous Cape Province. She holds a degree from the University of the Western Cape. She was employed in the local economic development sector of the Central Karoo for about twelve years.

Bans had served the African National Congress and its women's league in different positions, including as the regional deputy secretary and as the regional treasurer. She was also the party's regional elections manager.

Prior to the 2019 Western Cape provincial election, she was placed 13th on the ANC's candidate list to the Western Cape Provincial Parliament. Bans was not elected but Ebrahim Rasool declined his seat on the day the new provincial parliament was sworn in. The party selected her to fill his seat, and she was sworn in the next day on 23 May.

During the ANC's 9th Provincial Elective Conference held from 23 to 25 June 2023 at the Cape Town International Convention Centre, Bans was elected deputy provincial secretary of the party, defeating JJ van Rooyen.

Bans was elected to her first full term in the Provincial Parliament in the 2024 provincial election.
