= Shaun August =

South African politician

Councillor Shaun August
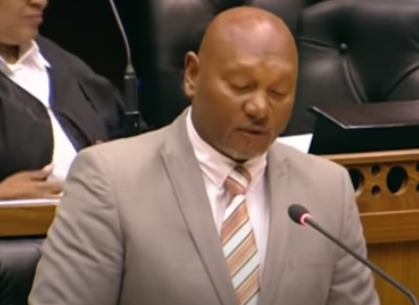

National Organiser of Good
- In office 20 January 2019 – 12 May 2023
- Leader: Patricia de Lille
- Preceded by: Position established
- Succeeded by: Sam Shabane

Member of the Western Cape Provincial Parliament
- In office 8 February 2022 – 12 May 2023

Member of the National Assembly of South Africa
- In office 22 May 2019 – 2 February 2022

Personal details
- Born: Shaun Nigel August Lavender Hill, Cape Town, Cape Province, South Africa
- Party: Democratic Alliance (2010–2018, 2023–present)
- Other political affiliations: Good (2018–2023); Independent Democrats (2004–2014)
- Occupation: Member of Parliament
- Profession: Politician

Shaun Nigel August is a South African politician and former prison warden. He was a Member of the National Assembly of South Africa from May 2019 until February 2022 and a Member of the Western Cape Provincial Parliament from February 2022 until his expulsion from Good in May 2023. He began his political career as a member of the Independent Democrats (ID). August was appointed as the party's deputy national organiser in 2006. August joined the Democratic Alliance (DA) when the ID merged with the party and served as the DA's chief whip in the City of Cape Town council from 2014 to 2018.

== Early life ==
August was born in Lavender Hill on the Cape Flats, Cape Town. He only fulfilled Grade 10 while at school. He found employment as a prison warden at the Pollsmoor Prison.

== Political career ==
He first met Patricia de Lille when she was on an official parliamentary oversight visit to the prison. When De Lille formed the Independent Democrats in 2003, August joined the party the next year. He became her bodyguard and travelled with her during the 2004 general election campaign. He was elected the party's deputy national organiser in 2006.

August became a member of the Cape Town City Council for the ID in May 2009. The ID and Democratic Alliance announced their merger in 2010. He was part of the main discussions. He held dual party membership and in the 2011 municipal elections, he was re-elected to the city council, this time as a member of the DA, as De Lille was elected the city's mayor. In May 2014, August was promoted to the position of chief whip of the council following the resignation of Grant Pascoe. He was re-elected in the 2016 municipal elections. August was also the DA's metro chairperson from 2015 to 2017.

After months of political infighting, De Lille announced her intention to resign as mayor in August 2018. August was seen as a potential mayoral candidate but ultimately chose not to run. She delivered her final speech to council on 25 October. Following her address, August resigned from council and the DA in solidarity with De Lille. She later announced her intention to form a new political party and established Good in December 2018. On 20 January 2019, August was appointed as the interim national organiser of the party.

== Parliamentary career ==
At the 2019 general election, Good won two seats in the National Assembly. August alongside De Lille filled those seats on 22 May 2019. He was appointed chief whip of the party.

=== Committee memberships ===
- Member of the Disciplinary Committee
- Alternate Member of the Portfolio Committee on Public Enterprises
- Member of the Portfolio Committee on Social Development
- Member of the Portfolio Committee on Cooperative Governance and Traditional Affairs
- Member of the Portfolio Committee on Human Settlements, Water and Sanitation
- Member of the Committee for Section 194 Enquiry

== Provincial parliament ==
On 7 February 2022, GOOD announced that August would be moving to the Western Cape Provincial Parliament, while Brett Herron, the party's sole representative in the provincial parliament, would be moving to the National Assembly in preparation for the party's 2024 election campaign. August became an MPP on 8 February 2022.

== Inappropriate sexual behaviour allegations ==
In June 2022, August and the deputy mayor of the Witzenberg Local Municipality and GOOD party member, Felicity Klazen were accused of inappropriate sexual behaviour during a by-election campaign in Witzenberg in March 2022. A total of 18 statements had produced by party volunteers and witnesses, in which August and Klazen were accused of allegedly being drunk, openly ‘openly sexing and fornicating’, having an extra-marital affair and plotting to oust Patricia de Lille as party leader. August has not confirmed or denied the allegations, saying: “Out of respect for the internal party process, I will not address the allegations at this time.”

In January 2023, it was reported that an external investigator appointed by the party found that August and Klazen should be subjected to an internal party disciplinary process over the allegations of inappropriate sexual behaviour made against them during the party's by-election campaign in Witzenburg in March 2022. On 12 May 2023, Good's National Management Committee resolved to expel August and Klazen which resulted in them losing their positions. Both August and Klazen brought applications on an urgent basis before the Western Cape High Court on 19 May to set aside their expulsions from the party and to interdict the party from filling their positions in the provincial parliament and council. The matter was struck off the court's roll. August has since rejoined the Democratic Alliance.

== Later career ==
In April 2025, August sworn in as a DA councillor in the City of Cape Town.
