= Under 21 Rugby World Championship =

Rugby tournament

- Sport: Rugby union
- Instituted: 2002
- Ceased: 2006; 20 years ago
- Regional: International (World Rugby)
- Holders: New Zealand (2006)
- Most titles: New Zealand (2 titles)

The IRB Under 21 Rugby World Cup was the premier tournament for male rugby union players under the age of 21, organised by the sports governing body the International Rugby Board (IRB) annually from 2002 through 2006. Both it and the Under 19 Rugby World Championship were replaced by the IRB Junior World Championship for under-20 players beginning in 2008.

== Finals ==
Ed.	Year	Champions	Score	Runners-up	Venue
1	2002	South Africa	24–21	Australia	Johannesburg, South Africa
2	2003	New Zealand	21–10	Australia	Oxford, England
3	2004	New Zealand	47–19	Ireland	Glasgow, Scotland
4	2005	South Africa	24–20	Australia	Mendoza, Argentina
5	2006	France	24–13	South Africa	Clermont-Ferrand, France

== Format ==
Twelve teams take part in the tournament. They are split into four pools (labelled A-D) of three according to their past performance. Each team plays three matches against three teams of other pool (pool A plays against pool D and pool B plays against pool C). Four points are awarded for a win, two for a draw, and none for a loss. One bonus point is awarded for scoring four tries or more, and one bonus points is awarded for loss by seven points or less.

After all pool matches teams are ranked by total match points. Top four teams qualify for the semi-finals (1st against 4th and 2nd against 3rd). Likewise, other teams enter play-offs for positions 5–8 and 9–12.
