= Rachel Windvogel =

South African politician

Rachel Windvogel MPP

Member of the Western Cape Provincial Parliament
- Incumbent
- Assumed office 22 May 2019

Personal details
- Party: African National Congress
- Occupation: Politician

Rachel Windvogel is a South African politician who has served as a Member of the Western Cape Provincial Parliament since May 2019. Windvogel is a member of the African National Congress. She is the ANC's shadow MEC for Health as she serves on the Standing Committee on Health in the legislature.

Windvogel was re-elected to the Provincial Parliament at the 2024 provincial election.
