= Duwayne Jacobs =

South African politician and community activist

Duwayne Jacobs ONA President

Former Member of the Western Cape Provincial Parliament
- In office 13 June 2024 – 21 August 2025

Personal details
- Born: 22 September 1975 (age 50)
- Party: One Nation Alliance

Duwayne Gilbert Jacobs (born 1975) is a South African politician and community activist who is a former Member of the Western Cape Provincial Parliament from 2024 until 2025. He was the sole representative of the National Coloured Congress in the provincial legislature, now the President of the One Nation Alliance. Jacobs had previously served as a proportional representation (PR) councillor in the City of Cape Town from 2021 until his election as an MPP in May 2024. He had resigned from the NCC in August 2025. He is the leader of the newly started One Nation Alliance.

== Political career ==
Jacobs is from Beacon Valley in Mitchells Plain on the Cape Flats of Cape Town. He joined the Cape Coloured Congress (now the National Coloured Congress) in the run-up to the 2021 local government elections and stood as their ward councillor candidate for ward 116 in the City of Cape Town. He did not win the ward but was elected to council from the CCC PR list.

In the 2024 provincial election, the National Coloured Congress won one seat in the Western Cape Provincial Parliament and Jacobs was selected to take up the seat. He was sworn in during the first sitting of the legislature on 13 June 2024.
