= Marius Swart =

South African politician and businessman (1941–2021)

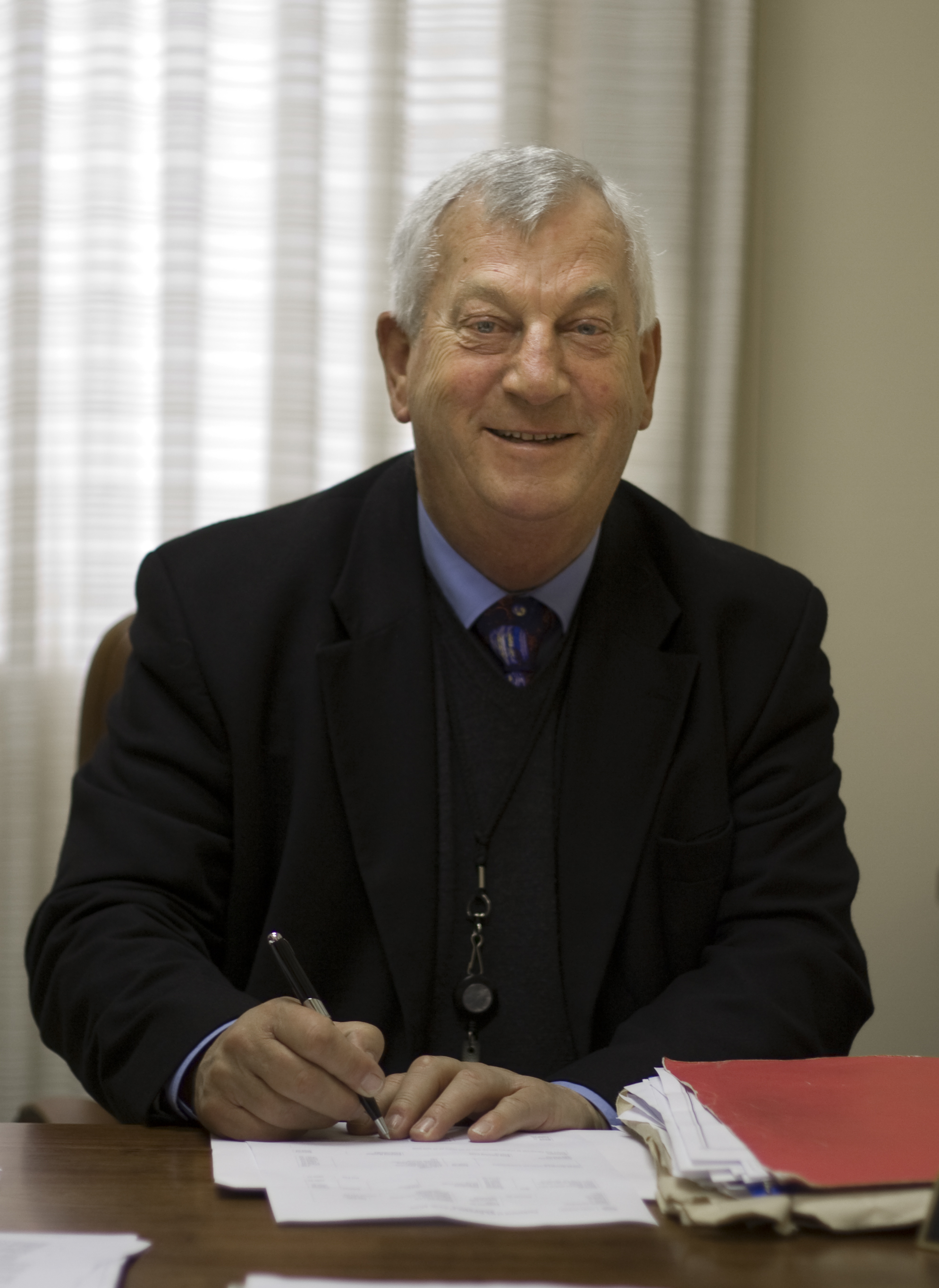
- Marius Swart in 2009

Member of the National Assembly of South Africa
- In office April 2004 – 7 May 2014

Executive Mayor of the George Local Municipality
- In office December 2000 – April 2004
- Preceded by: Post established
- Succeeded by: Bazil Petrus

Personal details
- Born: 1941 Swellendam, Cape Province, South Africa
- Died: 17 January 2021 (aged 79) George, Western Cape, South Africa
- Cause of death: COVID-19
- Party: Democratic Alliance
- Spouse: Sannett
- Children: 3
- Education: University of Stellenbosch (BA)

Marius Swart (1941 – 17 January 2021) was a South African politician and businessman. A member of the Democratic Alliance, he served as the inaugural Executive Mayor of the George Local Municipality from 2000 to 2004, when he was elected to the National Assembly. After serving two terms in parliament, Swart retired from politics in 2014.

== Early life and education ==
Swart was born in Swellendam in the Cape Province in 1941. He completed most of his school career in Kimberley before he matriculated at Voortrekker High School in Bethlehem in the Orange Free State in 1958. In 1965, Swart graduated from the University of Stellenbosch with a Bachelor of Arts in Business Economics and Psychology. After university, he worked in the corporate sector before he became the company director of Bolton Footwear. Swart later started his own business.

== Political career ==
Swart joined the newly formed Democratic Alliance and stood as their mayoral candidate for the newly established George Local Municipality in the 2000 municipal elections. After the election, the council elected him as the first Executive Mayor of the municipality. In the DA, he was elected chairperson of the DA's East Region in the Western Cape and became a member of the provincial executive committee of the party. Later on, he was elected to the DA's provincial council, the Federal Council, the Federal Executive, and served as deputy federal chairperson.

Swart served as mayor until his election to the National Assembly at the 2004 general election. In November 2006, Swart called for the Public Protector to probe the ongoing mayhem at the Department of Home Affairs. He also said that the department has the "reputation for being the most corrupt department." After his re-election in 2009, the newly elected DA parliamentary leader Athol Trollip appointed him as the DA's spokesperson on the Appropriations Committee and the Shadow Deputy Minister of Finance. In a shadow cabinet reshuffle in September 2010, Kobus Marais was appointed to succeed him as Shadow Deputy Minister of Finance. He was reappointed by the newly appointed DA parliamentary leader, Lindiwe Mazibuko, as the DA's spokesperson on appropriations in February 2012.

Ahead of the 2014 general election, Swart announced that he would be standing down as an MP and retiring from politics at the election.

== Personal life and death ==
Swart was married to Sannett, and they had three children. They lived in Herolds Bay. Swart was also the father-in-law of one of former African National Congress MP Jannie Momberg's sons.

On 8 January 2021, Swart was admitted to hospital in George after he had contracted COVID-19 during the COVID-19 pandemic in South Africa. He was reported as being in a critical condition. He died from the virus on 17 January.
