= Build One South Africa =

Political party in South Africa

- Abbreviation: BOSA
- Leader: Mmusi Maimane
- Chairperson: Khusta Jack
- Spokesperson: Sbu Zondi
- Deputy Leader: Nobuntu Hlazo-Webster
- Founder: Mmusi Maimane; Nobuntu Hlazo-Webster; Hlumelo Biko
- Founded: September 24, 2022
- Split from: Democratic Alliance
- Headquarters: Sandton, Gauteng, South Africa
- Ideology: Liberalism (South African); Ubuntu
- Political position: Centre
- National Assembly: 2 / 400
- National Council of Provinces: 0 / 90
- Pan-African Parliament: 0 / 5 (South African seats)
- Provincial Legislatures: 1 / 487

Website
- bosa.co.za

Build One South Africa (BOSA), officially registered as Build One South Africa With Mmusi Maimane, is a South African political party. It is led by Mmusi Maimane, the leader of the One SA Movement and the former leader of the Democratic Alliance. BOSA secured two parliamentary seats in the National Assembly during the 2024 South African general election.

== History ==
The party was launched on 24 September 2022 in Naledi, Soweto. The deputy leader is Nobuntu Hlazo-Webster, founder and convener of the South African Women’s Commission. The chairperson of the party is the current Nelson Mandela Bay deputy mayor Mkhuseli Jack.

The party contested its first by-election in October 2023, winning 1% of the vote in the ward one election in Sol Plaatje Local Municipality.

The party contested the 2024 general election as an "umbrella organisation" for independent candidates. Maimane stood as the party's presidential candidate in the elections. The party received around 0.4% of the national vote in the election.

=== Merger ===
On 5 October 2025, the party announced its merger with Good and Rise Mzansi to form Unite for Change, a new party that was intended to be registered to contest the 2026 municipal elections. Build One South Africa will continue to exist independently until the 2029 national elections, after which it will fully merge into the new party.

The merger was put on hold in April 2026, with the three parties stating that "it cannot be implemented effectively under the pressure of an election campaign. As a result, the parties have determined that the best option is to contest the 2026 local government elections individually and pursue consolidation afterward".

In the meantime, BOSA merged with the People's Prosperity Movement, a small party based in the Western-Cape .

=== Mandela and Sisulu descendants ===
In June 2026, the party announced that members of two of the countries most influential political families, Thembela Mandela and Ziyeka Sisulu, the grandchildren of Nelson Mandela and Walter Sisulu respectively, had joined the party, and would be contesting the 2026 South African municipal elections as ward candidates for the City of Johannesburg.

== Election results ==
=== National Assembly elections ===
Election	Party leader	Total votes	Share of vote	Seats	+/–	Status
2024	Mmusi Maimane	65,912	0.41% (Note: From 2024, seats in the National Assembly are determined by a combination of the national ballot, and the nine regional ballots. Only the national ballot figures are shown here.)	2 / 400	New	Opposition

=== National Council of Provinces elections ===
Election	Total # of seats won	+/–	Government
2024	0 / 90	New	Extra-parliamentary

=== Provincial elections ===
Election	Eastern Cape		Free State		Gauteng		Kwazulu-Natal		Limpopo		Mpumalanga		North-West		Northern Cape		Western Cape	
Election	%	Seats	%	Seats	%	Seats	%	Seats	%	Seats	%	Seats	%	Seats	%	Seats	%	Seats
2024	0.18	0/73	0.35	0/30	0.76	1/80	0.13	0/80	0.26	0/64	0.19	0/51	0.44	0/38	0.25	0/30	0.41	0/42
