= Memory Booysen =

South African politician (b. 1969)

Memory Booysen MPP

Member of the Western Cape Provincial Parliament
- Incumbent
- Assumed office 13 June 2024

Executive Mayor of the Garden Route District Municipality (Formerly: Eden District Municipality)
- In office 31 August 2016 – 8 June 2024
- Preceded by: Wessie van der Westhuizen
- Succeeded by: Andrew Stroebel

Executive Mayor of the Bitou Local Municipality
- In office 9 June 2011 – 2 August 2016
- Preceded by: Lulama Mvimbi
- Succeeded by: Peter Lobese

Personal details
- Born: 1969 (age 56–57) Hankey, Cape Province, South Africa
- Party: Democratic Alliance (2011–present); Congress of the People (2009–2011); Independent (2007–2009); African National Congress (Until 2007)
- Children: 3
- Education: University of the Western Cape; Witwatersrand Technikon
- Profession: Politician

Memory Booysen (born 1969) is a South African politician who has been the Chairperson of the Standing Committee on Health and Wellness in the Western Cape Provincial Parliament since 2024. A member of the Democratic Alliance, he was elected to the provincial parliament in 2024.

Prior to his election to the Provincial Parliament, Booysen was involved in the politics of the Garden Route district of the Western Cape. He served as the mayor of the Bitou Local Municipality from 2011 until 2016 when he was elected the district mayor, a position he would hold until his election to the provincial legislature in 2024.

== Early life and education ==
Booysen was born to a Xhosa family 1969 in Hankey in what is today known as the Eastern Cape province of South Africa. His father, John Lolwana, had changed his surname to Booysen and convinced the apartheid authorities that he was a Coloured which allowed the family to settle in the predominantly Coloured community of Hankey. Following his father's death in 1980, the authorities evicted the family and they moved to Centerton, a Black community outside of Hankey. After high school, Booysen studied for a higher diploma in education from the University of the Western Cape and then for a certificate in hotel management from the Witwatersrand Technikon. He worked for the Southern Sun group for a total of twelve years.

== Political career ==
Booysen moved to Plettenberg Bay in 1989. He joined the African National Congress and rose through the party's ranks to become the chairperson of the ANC's Greater Plettenberg Bay branch and the party's youth league. In 2002, he found employment as a personal assistant to the mayor of Bitou Local Municipality. Booysen was chairperson of the ANC's Plettenberg Bay sub-region by 2004.

Booysen stood as the ANC's candidate for Ward 6 of the Bitou Local Municipality, which encompassed the Kwanokuthula township, in the 2006 local government elections, and was elected. A year later, he was expelled from the ANC and stood as an independent candidate in the subsequent by-election in his ward, which he won.

In 2008, Booysen joined the newly established Congress of the People and was appointed the party's Southern Cape election manager for the 2009 national and provincial elections.

Following the implosion of COPE, Booysen joined the Democratic Alliance. He stood as the party's mayoral candidate for Bitou in the 2011 local government elections. The DA formed a coalition with COPE to govern the municipality which saw Booysen elected as mayor of Bitou.

Following the 2016 municipal elections, he was elected as the mayor of the Eden District Municipality which later became the Garden Route District Municipality. He was re-elected for a second term as district mayor after the 2021 local elections.

In March 2024, it was announced that Booysen had been placed on the DA candidate list for the Western Cape Provincial Parliament for the election on 29 May 2024 amid allegations of misconduct. The DA won 24 seats in the provincial election and Booysen was selected to take up one of them. He resigned as Garden Route district mayor on 8 June and was sworn in as a member of the Provincial Parliament on 13 June 2024. On 4 July 2024, he was elected to chair the Standing Committee on Health and Wellness.

== Personal life ==
Booysen has three daughters.
