= Khume Ramulifho =

South African politician

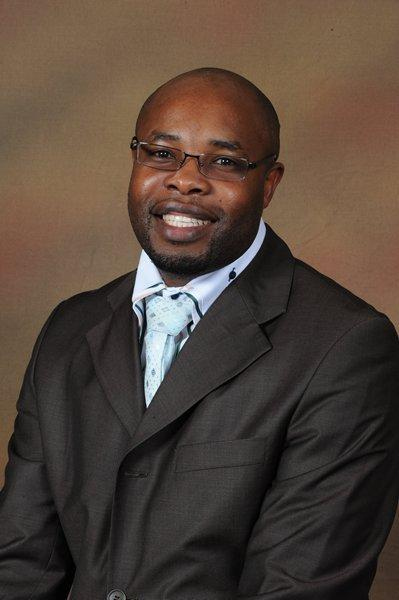

Member of the Gauteng Provincial Legislature
- Incumbent
- Assumed office 6 May 2009

Personal details
- Born: Nkhumeni Ramulifho; 27 February 1979 (age 47) Lwamondo, Venda, South Africa
- Party: Democratic Alliance

Nkhumeni "Khume" Ramulifho (born 27 February 1979) is a South African politician of Rise Mzansi, previously the Democratic Alliance where he served as Federal Youth Leader and a member of the Gauteng Provincial Legislature for the party. From October 2011, he was the DA Gauteng South Chairperson, until joining Rise Mzansi in January 2024.

== Political career ==
Ramulifho joined the Democratic Party (DP), the predecessor to the DA, in 1998 while still a student at the then Vaal Technikon, and spent the following years rising through the ranks of the party's youth movement.

After serving in various positions, he became the national leader of the DA Youth in 2008, a position he held until 2010. Ramulifho was elected to the Gauteng Provincial Legislature in 2009, and later served as DA's provincial spokesperson on education.

He ran unsuccessfully for one of the three DA Deputy Federal Chairperson positions in 2010, but was instead elected as the Regional Chairperson of the DA in Gauteng South the following year.

In March 2018, Ramulifho announced his candidacy for Deputy Chairperson of the Federal Council. He was not elected at the DA's elective congress.

In October 2019, Ramulifho declared his candidacy for the post of interim Federal Chairperson of the Democratic Alliance after Athol Trollip resigned. He lost to Ivan Meyer.

In January 2024, Ramulifho announced that he was leaving the DA to join Rise Mzansi.
