= Pan Africanist Student Movement of Azania =

Revolutionary student movement

- President: Aphelele Buku
- Secretary General: Zandisiwe "Nopa" Nyinyimbana
- Founded: 15 October 1989 (as PASO); 19 June 1997 (as PASMA)
- Mother party: Pan Africanist Congress of Azania
- Website: www.pac.org.za

The Pan Africanist Student Movement of Azania (PASMA) is a revolutionary student movement born at the University of the Western Cape, Cape Town, South Africa. It was founded in 1989 as the "Pan Africanist Student Organisation of Azania" (PASO) in Roodepoort, Johannesburg. Among its founders were Lungelo Mbandazayo (Founding President) and Lawrence "General" Nqandela (Secretary General), who led the Pan Africanist Congress of Azania youth wing.

== See also ==
- Pan Africanist Youth Congress of Azania
- Pan-Africanism
- African socialism
