= FORU =

FORU may refer to:

- Federation of Oceania Rugby Unions, a regional governing body of rugby unions in Oceania
- Uruguayan Regional Workers' Federation, a national trade union federation in Uruguay
