= Songezo Zibi =

South African writer, communications leader and politician

The Honourable Songezo Zibi MP
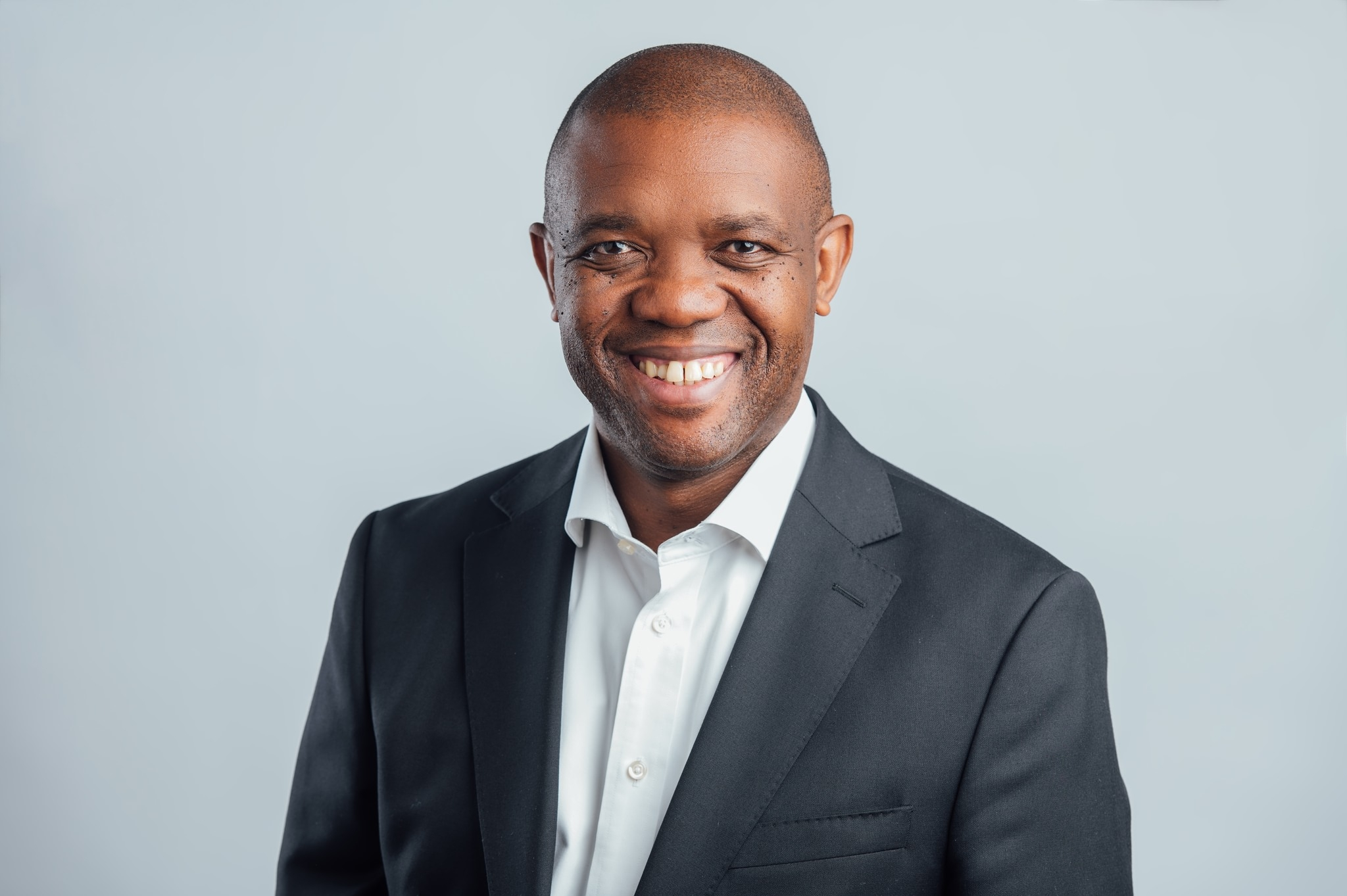
- RISE Mzansi National Leader
- Born: 27 December 1975 (age 50); Mqanduli, Transkei
- Education: Nelson Mandela University, 1998
- Occupations: Writer, editor, communications leader and politician
- Office: Chairperson of the Standing Committee on Public Accounts
- Predecessor: Mkhuleko Hlengwa
- Political party: Rise Mzansi

Songezo Zibi (born 27 December 1975) is the leader of the South African political party, Rise Mzansi, and was elected to the National Assembly in 2024. He is the chairperson of parliament's Standing Committee On Public Accounts. He is a former corporate spokesperson and manager, writer, associate editor of the Financial Mail, and former editor of Business Day, business and economy daily newspaper in South Africa.

== Early life ==
Songezo Zibi was born in 1975 in Mqanduli what was then the rural apartheid Bantustan of the Transkei and today is the Eastern Cape. He is the only child of a single mother, Nomfundo Zibi, who worked as a teacher. Zibi was raised by his grandparents, Christopher and Lynette Zibi, who were both community leaders in Zwelitsha Location. He attended Phangindlela Junior Secondary School in Mqanduli, St John’s College in Mthatha and All Saints College in Bhisho. Zibi has said that being raised in rural South Africa has been deeply formative to his politics.

Songezo Zibi's uncle, Vuyani Zibi, was an anti-apartheid activist with the armed wing of the ANC, uMkhonto we Sizwe. In 1982, Vuyani Zibi was killed by SADF Special Forces in Maseru, Lesotho.

== Education ==
Songezo Zibi studied at Port Elizabeth Technikon, which later became part of Nelson Mandela University. At university, he was a member of the Pan Africanist Student Movement of Azania, a member of the Azanian Student Organisation and chairman of the debating society.

== Career in Communications ==
After university, Zibi's first job was in communications and public relations for Volkswagen South Africa where he worked from 1998 to 2006. He has referred to this as "the best years of my working life". Later he worked in corporate communications for mining company Xstrata, from 2006 to 2013. From 2011 to 2013 he was executive manager for corporate affairs at XStrata.

In 2014, Songezo Zibi joined Financial Mail as associate editor and then became the editor of Business Day.

He left Business Day in 2016 to become the head of corporate communications for banking giant Absa until 2021.

== Civil society roles ==
While working at XStrata, Zibi was one of the co-founders of the 'Midrand Group' along with Prince Mashele, Mzukisi Qobo and Brutus Madala.

While he was at Absa, Zibi served on the board of the Centre for Development and Enterprise.

In 2021, Zibi co-founded the Rivonia Circle think tank along with Lukhona Mnguni and Lorato Tshenkeng. It is aimed at deepening political participation in South Africa. The funders of Rivonia Circle are unknown but it has been alleged that the organisation is funded by the Brenthurst Foundation.

From October 2018 to May 2023 Zibi was non-executive director of George Soros's Open Society Foundation in South Africa.

== RISE Mzansi ==
In April 2023, Zibi left Rivonia Circle and co-founded the political party Rise Mzansi, becoming its first national leader. The party refers to itself as social democratic and contested for the first time in the 2024 South African general election on 29 May 2024.

== Parliament ==
In the 2024 general election Rise won two seats in the National Assembly in one in the Gauteng Provincial Legislature.

Rise joined the Government of National Unity (GNU), but was not allocated any positions in the Cabinet, nor any deputy ministers.

On 10 July 2024 the House of Assembly elected Zibi as chairperson of the Standing Committee on Public Accounts (SCOPA). SCOPA is a key oversight committee in Parliament aimed at ensuring that the government money is accounted for, and that executive and organs of State are held accountable. ActionSA, an opposition party that has not joined the GNU, criticised his election saying that it is "a troubling departure from our own National Assembly and international best practice" of electing a member of an opposition party as chair.

== Writing ==
In his capacity as a journalist and writer, Zibi covers South African politics and policy, economics and social dynamics. He is the author of two books, Manifesto: A New Vision for South Africa (2022) and Raising the Bar: Hope and Renewal in South Africa (2014).

== Personal life ==
Songezo Zibi is married to Babalwa Zibi. He has three children.

== See also ==
- Makashule Gana
- Rise Mzansi
- Nomsa Marchesi
