= 2006 Under 21 Rugby World Championship =

The 2006 Under 21 Rugby World Championship was played in the Auvergne region of France throughout June 2006. The final was played between South Africa and France at the Stade Marcel-Michelin in Clermont-Ferrand, which saw France win 24–13.

== Participants ==
- Argentina
- Australia
- England
- Fiji
- France
- Georgia
- Ireland
- Italy
- New Zealand
- Scotland
- South Africa
- Wales

== Results ==
=== Pool stages ===
- 9 June England 34–8 Fiji Stade Darragon, Vichy
- 9 June Italy 16–75 New Zealand Stade Émile Pons, Riom
- 9 June Wales 73–25 Georgia Stade au Complexe du Mas, Issoire
- 9 June Ireland 8–26 France Stade au Complexe du Mas, Issoire
- 9 June Australia 18–14 Scotland Stade Darragon, Vichy
- 9 June South Africa 20–16 Argentina Stade Émile Pons, Riom
- 13 June Ireland 22–26 Argentina Stade Couturier, Cournon d'Auvergne
- 13 June Australia 43–20 Fiji Stade Antonin Chastel, Thiers
- 13 June England 14–29 New Zealand Stade Darragon, Vichy
- 13 June South Africa 102–17 Georgia Stade Antonin Chastel, Thiers
- 13 June Wales 3–32 France Stade Couturier, Cournon d'Auvergne
- 13 June Italy 10–26 Scotland Stade Darragon, Vichy
- 17 June Italy 17–43 Fiji Stade Darragon, Vichy
- 17 June Wales 10–13 Argentina Stade Émile Pons, Riom
- 17 June Ireland 47–0 Georgia Stade au Complexe du Mas, Issoire
- 17 June Australia 21–17 New Zealand Stade Darragon, Vichy
- 17 June England 31–12 Scotland Stade Émile Pons, Riom
- 17 June South Africa 14–10 France Stade au Complexe du Mas, Issoire

== Results after pool games ==
2006 IRB Under 21 World Championship
Team	Played	Won	Lost	For	Against	Tries For	Tries Against	Bonus Points	Points
South Africa	3	3	0	136	43	17	5	1	13
Australia	3	3	0	82	51	10	5	1	13
France	3	2	1	68	25	9	2	3	11
New Zealand	3	2	1	121	51	15	5	2	10
England	3	2	1	79	49	11	4	2	10
Argentina	3	2	1	55	52	8	6	2	10
Ireland	3	1	2	77	52	11	8	2	6
Wales	3	1	2	86	70	11	9	2	6
Scotland	3	1	2	52	59	5	9	2	6
Fiji	3	1	2	71	94	11	11	1	5
Italy	3	0	3	43	144	4	22	0	0
Georgia	3	0	3	42	222	5	31	0	0

== Second round ==
=== 10th v 11th ===
- 21 June Fiji 33–12 Italy Stade au Complexe du Mas, Issoire

=== 9th v 12th ===
- 21 June Scotland 46–14 Georgia Stade au Complexe du Mas, Issoire

=== 6th v 7th ===
- 21 June Argentina 20–42 Ireland Stade Darragon, Vichy

=== 5th v 8th ===
- 21 June England 13–11 Wales Stade Darragon, Vichy

== Semi-finals ==
=== 2nd v 3rd ===
- 21 June Australia 17–32 France Stade Marcel-Michelin, Clermont-Ferrand

=== 1st v 4th ===
- 21 June South Africa 40–23 New Zealand Stade Marcel-Michelin, Clermont-Ferrand

== Play-offs ==
=== 11th place play-off ===
- 25 June Italy 12–9 Georgia Stade Antonin Chastel, Thiers

=== 9th place play-off ===
- 25 June Fiji 21–19 Scotland Stade Antonin Chastel, Thiers

=== 7th place play-off ===
- 25 June Argentina 28–12 Wales Stade Couturier, Cournon d'Auvergne

=== 5th place play-off ===
- 25 June Ireland 8–32 England Stade Couturier, Cournon d'Auvergne

== Finals ==
=== 3rd place play-off ===
- 25 June New Zealand 39–36 Australia Stade Marcel-Michelin, Clermont-Ferrand

=== Championship final ===
- 25 June South Africa 13–24 France Stade Marcel-Michelin, Clermont-Ferrand
