= 2005 Under 21 Rugby World Championship =

Tournament details
- Host: Argentina
- Date: 9–25 June 2005
- Teams: 12

Final positions
- Champions: South Africa
- Runner-up: Australia
- Third place: New Zealand

Tournament statistics
- Matches played: 30

The 2005 Under-21 Rugby World Championship took place in Argentina between 9 June and 25 June 2005. The 2005 championship was the fourth contested. This championship saw South Africa win the final over Australia 24–20.

== Venues ==
| Chacras Rugby Club | Estadio Malvinas Argentinas | Liceo Rugby Club | Marista Rugby Club | Mendoza Rugby Club |
|---|---|---|---|---|
| Mendoza | Mendoza | Mendoza | Mendoza | Mendoza |
| | Capacity: 40,268 | | | |

== Participants ==
The following 12 teams participated in the 2005 Under-21 Rugby World Championship.

| Africa | Americas | Europe | Oceania |
|---|---|---|---|
| South Africa | Argentina; Canada | England; France; Ireland; Italy; Scotland; Wales | Australia; New Zealand; Samoa |

== Pool stages ==
The 12 teams were split into four groups of three teams. After all pool matches teams are ranked by total match points. Four group winners qualify for the semi-finals and bottom eight enter play-offs for positions 5–8 and 9–12.

=== Pool A–D ===
| Team | Pld | W | D | L | PF | PA | PD | BP | Pts |
|---|---|---|---|---|---|---|---|---|---|
| New Zealand | 3 | 2 | 0 | 1 | 195 | 68 | +127 | 4 | 12 |
| Argentina | 3 | 2 | 0 | 1 | 121 | 63 | +58 | 3 | 11 |
| Scotland | 3 | 1 | 0 | 2 | 82 | 72 | +10 | 2 | 6 |

| Team | Pld | W | D | L | PF | PA | PD | BP | Pts |
|---|---|---|---|---|---|---|---|---|---|
| Australia | 3 | 3 | 0 | 0 | 99 | 85 | +14 | 2 | 14 |
| Wales | 3 | 1 | 0 | 2 | 70 | 104 | −34 | 3 | 7 |
| Canada | 3 | 0 | 0 | 3 | 34 | 209 | −175 | 0 | 0 |

- 9 June, New Zealand 60–15 Wales Liceo RC, Mendoza
- 9 June, Scotland 22–28 Australia Chacras RC, Mendoza
- 9 June, Argentina 65–7 Canada Liceo RC, Mendoza
- 13 June, New Zealand 92–7 Canada Mendoza RC, Mendoza
- 13 June, Scotland 8–24 Wales Maristas RC, Mendoza
- 13 June, Argentina 20–25 Australia Mendoza RC, Mendoza
- 17 June, New Zealand 43–46 Australia Chacras RC, Mendoza
- 17 June, Scotland 52–20 Canada Liceo RC, Mendoza
- 17 June, Argentina 36–31 Wales Chacras RC, Mendoza

=== Pool B–C ===
| Team | Pld | W | D | L | PF | PA | PD | BP | Pts |
|---|---|---|---|---|---|---|---|---|---|
| England | 3 | 1 | 0 | 2 | 95 | 93 | +2 | 2 | 6 |
| Ireland | 3 | 1 | 0 | 2 | 77 | 94 | −17 | 1 | 5 |
| Italy | 3 | 0 | 0 | 3 | 63 | 149 | −86 | 3 | 3 |

| Team | Pld | W | D | L | PF | PA | PD | BP | Pts |
|---|---|---|---|---|---|---|---|---|---|
| South Africa | 3 | 3 | 0 | 0 | 159 | 44 | +115 | 3 | 15 |
| France | 3 | 3 | 0 | 0 | 111 | 90 | +21 | 2 | 14 |
| Samoa | 3 | 1 | 0 | 2 | 66 | 101 | −35 | 0 | 4 |

- 9 June, England 52–22 Samoa Maristas RC, Mendoza
- 9 June, Italy 3–83 South Africa Maristas RC, Mendoza
- 9 June, Ireland 23–31 France Chacras RC, Mendoza
- 13 June, England 16–34 South Africa Liceo RC, Mendoza
- 13 June, Ireland 29–21 Samoa Maristas RC, Mendoza
- 13 June, Italy 40–43 France Liceo RC, Mendoza
- 17 June, England 27–37 France Mendoza RC, Mendoza
- 17 June, Italy 20–23 Samoa Mendoza RC, Mendoza
- 17 June, Ireland 25–42 South Africa Liceo RC, Mendoza

== Semi-finals ==
- 21 June, Argentina 20–6 England Mendoza RC, Mendoza
- 21 June, Ireland 77–3 Canada Chacras RC, Mendoza
- 21 June, South Africa 16–12 New Zealand Liceo RC, Mendoza
- 21 June, Wales 25–43 Scotland Mendoza RC, Mendoza
- 21 June, Samoa 38–25 Italy Chacras RC, Mendoza
- 21 June, France 16–28 Australia Liceo RC, Mendoza

== Play-Offs ==
- 11th Place Play-Off
  - 25 June, Italy 30–33 Canada Chacras RC, Mendoza
- 9th Place Play-Off
  - 25 June, Ireland 34–17 Samoa Maristas RC, Mendoza
- 7th Place Play-Off
  - 25 June, Wales 32–57 England Liceo RC, Mendoza
- 5th Place Play-Off
  - 25 June, Argentina 39–7 Scotland Mendoza RC, Mendoza
- 3rd Place Play-Off
  - 25 June, France 21–47 New Zealand Malvinas Argentinas, Mendoza

== Championship final ==
25 June, South Africa 24–20 Australia Malvinas Argentinas, Mendoza
