= New Zealand national under-21 rugby union team =

New Zealand
- Union: New Zealand Rugby Union
- Nickname: Colts (formerly)
Team kit	Change kit

World Cup
- Best result: Champions 2000, 2001, 2003, 2004

The New Zealand Under 21s rugby union team was a national representative team for players aged under-21. In 2008, in accordance with new IRB rule, the New Zealand Under 21s and the Under 19s were both permanently replaced by the New Zealand Under 20s for the inaugural 2008 IRB Junior World Championship.

== History ==
New Zealand Under 21 (formerly Colts) was first selected in 1955 and played annually until 2007. The Under 21s enjoyed success on the world stage, winning SANZAR/UAR tournaments and world titles in:

- 2000
- 2001
- 2003
- 2004

In the 2002 Championship New Zealand won 3 games in 4 rounds, losing only to South Africa 18-19. This led to New Zealand playing in the 3rd place playoff where they beat Wales 59-7. South Africa beat Australia 24-21 in the final.

In the 2005 Under 21 Rugby World Championship in Argentina, New Zealand lost 12-16 to South Africa in the semi-final and then beat France 47-21 in the 3rd place play off. South Africa beat Australia 24–20 in the final.

At the 2006 Under 21 Rugby World Championship in France, New Zealand lost 23-40 to South Africa in the semi-final and lost 36-39 to Australia in the 3rd place play off. France beat South Africa 24-13 in the final.

== See also ==
- New Zealand national schoolboy rugby union team
- New Zealand national under-19 rugby union team
- New Zealand national under-20 rugby union team
- Junior All Blacks
