= Brett Herron (politician) =

South African politician (born 1966)

Brett Herron MPP

Member of the Western Cape Provincial Parliament
- Incumbent
- Assumed office 13 June 2024
- In office 22 May 2019 – 4 February 2022

Secretary-General of Good
- Incumbent
- Assumed office 20 January 2019
- Deputy: Suzette Little (2023–present)
- Leader: Patricia de Lille
- Preceded by: Position established

Member of the National Assembly of South Africa
- In office 8 February 2022 – 28 May 2024
- Preceded by: Shaun August

Personal details
- Born: Brett Norton Herron; 14 November 1966 (age 59) Durban, South Africa
- Party: Good (2018–present)
- Other political affiliations: Democratic Alliance (2010–2018); Independent Democrats (until disbandment)
- Education: University of Natal; London School of Economics
- Profession: Politician

Brett Norton Herron (born 14 November 1966) is a South African politician and attorney who has been a member of the Western Cape Provincial Parliament since June 2024. He previously served in the house from May 2019 until February 2022. He also served as a Member of the National Assembly of South Africa from February 2022 to May 2024. Herron is the secretary-general of the GOOD party. He was the party's candidate for Mayor of Cape Town in the 2021 municipal elections.

Formerly a member of the Democratic Alliance and the Independent Democrats, he served as a mayoral committee member for transport and urban settlements from 2011 to 2018.

== Early life and education ==
Herron was born and raised in Durban in the former Natal. His father was a member of Durban City Council.

Herron obtained a Bachelor of Arts and an LLB from the University of Natal. He completed his articles of clerkship in Durban before being admitted as an attorney in 1994. Herron moved to New York City in 1998 and lived there until 2001. After returning to South Africa, he became director of the South African Law School.

Herron graduated with a Master of Science in Cities from the London School of Economics in 2020.

== Political career ==
Herron was a senior member of the Independent Democrats. In July 2008, he was elected policy convenor of the party's Cape Town metro district executive committee. He was placed on the party's candidate lists for the 2009 general election and was elected to the Western Cape Provincial Parliament. However, the party gave his seat to Sarah Paulse, the sister of party leader Patricia de Lille. Herron was then sworn in as a Cape Town city councillor for the ID. The ID announced its merger with the Democratic Alliance in October 2010 and Herron was given dual party membership.

After the 2011 municipal election, he was sworn in as a councillor for the DA. De Lille was elected mayor of Cape Town, and she appointed Herron as the mayoral committee member for transport and urban settlements.

In August 2018, De Lille announced that she would resign as mayor at the end of October. Herron declared his candidacy for the post, but the DA selected Dan Plato. On 1 November 2018, he resigned from council and from the DA. He was the ninth councillor to resign from the DA following De Lille's last address as mayor on 25 October.

De Lille announced the formation of her new political party, Good, on 2 December. Herron was appointed as the party's inaugural secretary-general on 20 January 2019.

Prior to the general election on 8 May 2019, he was second on the new party's provincial candidate list, second on the regional candidate list and fourth on the national candidate list. The party won one seat in the provincial parliament and Herron filled that seat on 22 May 2019.

On 22 August 2021, Herron was announced as Good's mayoral candidate for the City of Cape Town for the municipal elections on 1 November 2021. The DA retained their majority on the city council and Herron remained a member of the Provincial Parliament.

== Parliamentary career ==
On 7 February 2022, the GOOD party released a statement in which they announced that Herron would be taking up GOOD MP Shaun August's seat in the National Assembly, while August would replace Herron in the Provincial Parliament in preparation for the party's 2024 election campaign. Herron was sworn in as a Member of the National Assembly on 8 February 2022.

Herron was selected to take up Good's single seat in the Provincial Parliament following the 2024 general election.

== Personal life ==
Herron is gay.
