= Leon van Wyk =

South African politician

Member of the Western Cape Provincial Parliament
- Incumbent
- Assumed office 10 May 2024

Executive Mayor of the George Local Municipality
- In office 22 May 2020 – 9 May 2024
- Preceded by: Melvin Naik

Personal details
- Born: Leon David van Wyk; 26 January 1956 (68) Oudtshoorn, Cape Province, South Africa

Leon David van Wyk (born 26 January 1956) is a South African politician and member of the Democratic Alliance (DA). Since 22 May 2020, he has served as the mayor of the George Local Municipality. He succeeded the corruption accused Melvin Naik. Van Wyk was previously a member of the mayor's committee for finance.

== Early life ==
Van Wyk was born in Oudtshoorn and was schooled in Worcester. He graduated from the University of Cape Town with a Bachelor of Commerce degree and with joint majors in Economics and Accounting. He qualified as a Chartered accountant by 1981.

== Career ==
Van Wyk succeeded Melvin Maik as mayor of George Local Municipality, after his membership was cancelled, after being accused of corruption. Van Wyk was chosen as the DA candidate for mayor on 8 May 2020.

On 10 May 2024, Van Wyk was sworn in as Western Cape Member of Parliament.
