= Good (political party) =

Political party in South Africa

- Leader: Patricia de Lille
- Chairperson: Matthew Cook
- Secretary-General: Brett Herron
- Deputy National Chairperson: Thabo Charles Pheku
- Deputy Secretary-General: Suzette Little
- Founder: Patricia de Lille
- Founded: 2 December 2018
- Split from: Democratic Alliance
- Ideology: Social democracy
- Political position: Centre-left
- Colours: Orange
- Slogan: South Africa Needs Good
- National Assembly seats: 1 / 400
- NCOP seats: 0 / 90
- Provincial Legislatures: 1 / 487
- Cape Town City Council: 9 / 231

Website
- www.forgood.org.za

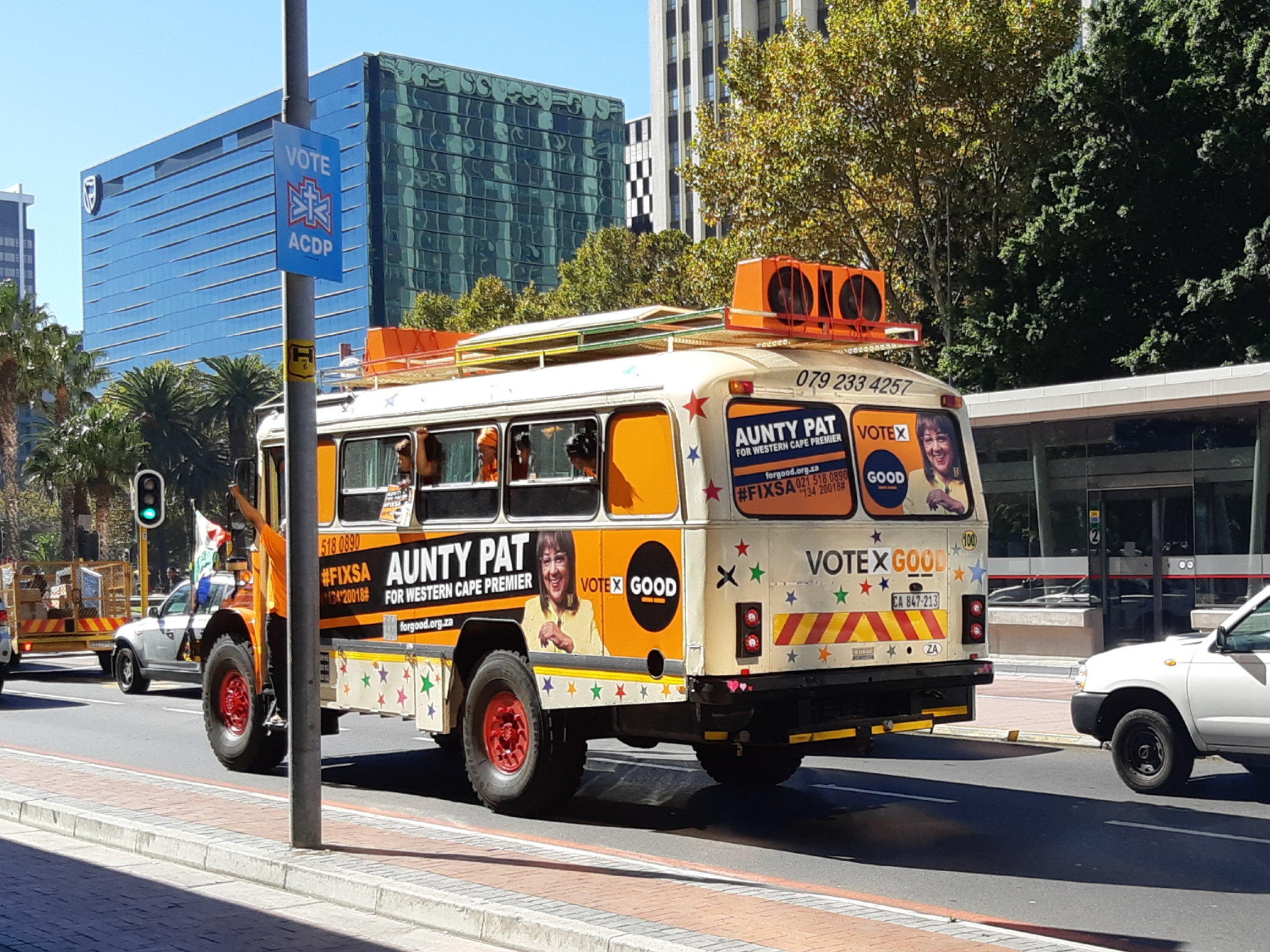
A GOOD party campaign bus in Cape Town during the 2019 South African general election.

Good (stylized as GOOD) is a South African social democratic political party that was formed in December 2018.

The party is led by its founder, veteran South African politician Patricia de Lille, who is the current Minister of Tourism and former Mayor of the city of Cape Town. She is currently the party's sole member in the National Assembly.

The party's political ideology is social democracy, with a focus on spatial justice, Universal Basic Income, and environmental justice. The party's stronghold is the Western Cape province.

In May 2019, De Lille was the only opposition member appointed to serve in the cabinet of South Africa. She had stated that Good would remain an opposition party.

In June 2024, Good agreed to join the ANC-led government of national unity (GNU). De Lille continued serving as South Africa's Minister of Tourism in the coalition.

Good will merge with several other parties in 2029, ceasing to exist and becoming a part of the Unite for Change party.

== Formation ==
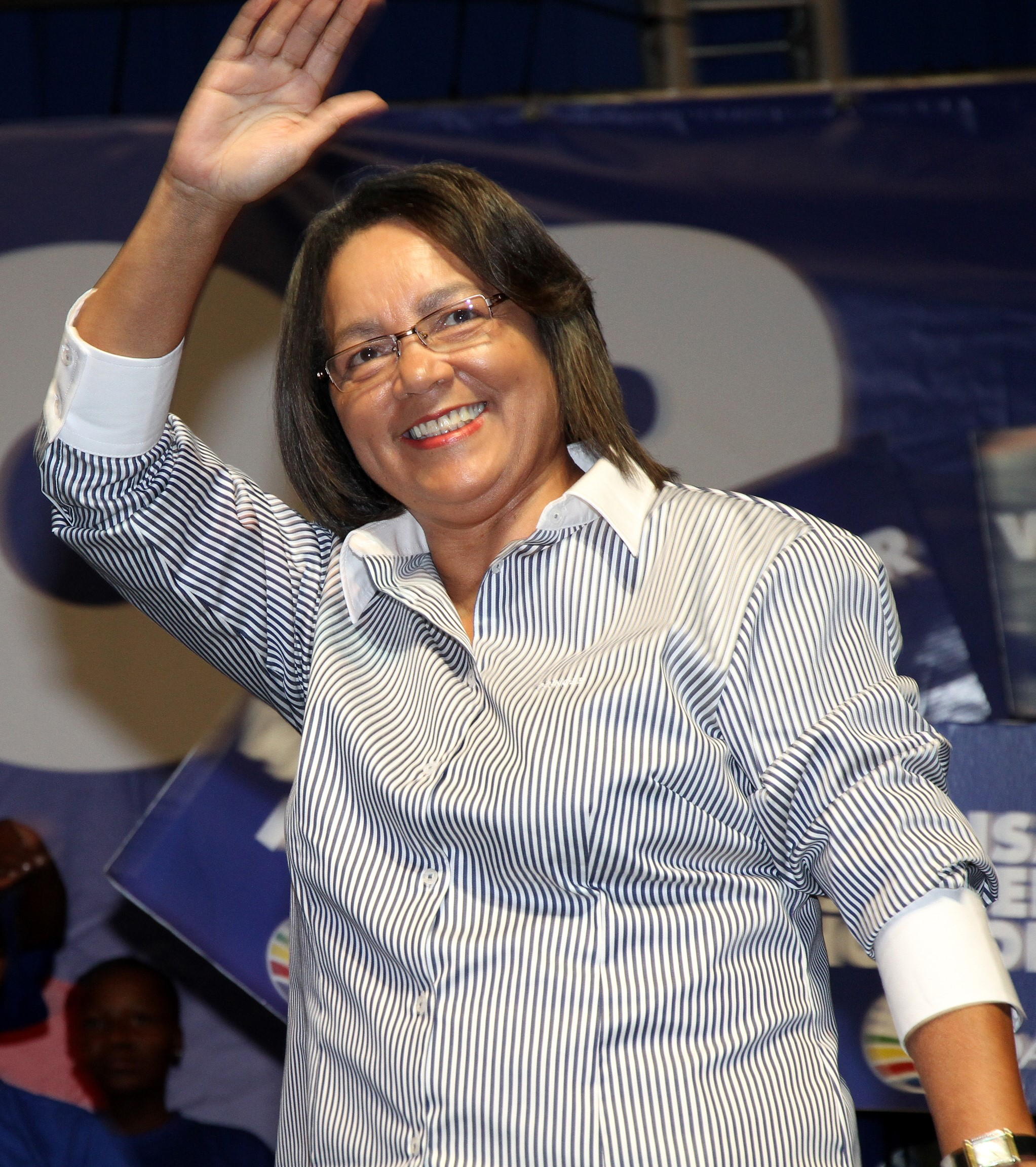
Patricia de Lille, leader and founding member of the party

Patricia de Lille is a South African politician. She was elected to the National Assembly as a Pan Africanist Congress (PAC) member in 1994. She held many leadership positions in the party. During the 2003 floor-crossing period, she broke away from PAC and formed the Independent Democrats (ID). The party was the first political party in South Africa to be led by a woman that contested elections and won seats. In 2010, after meetings between the Democratic Alliance Federal Executive and the Independent Democrats Executive, it was announced that the ID would merge with the Democratic Alliance (DA). Members of the Independent Democrats held dual party membership. The ID was officially dissolved after the 2014 general elections.

In March 2011, de Lille was selected by the Democratic Alliance to be the party's mayoral candidate in Cape Town. She was subsequently elected Mayor of Cape Town in May 2011. She served until October 2018. During the last months of her mayoral career, the Democratic Alliance accused de Lille of covering up corruption in the municipality. She strongly denied these allegations. When De Lille resigned as mayor, she also resigned as a member of the Democratic Alliance, citing that the party had been abusive towards her. DA Chief Whip Shaun August and many other councillors, including Mayoral Committee Member for Transport Brett Herron, resigned their positions in protest to the removal of De Lille. They were all members of the previous Independent Democrats. It was speculated that de Lille would revive the Independent Democrats and that it would be the "kingmaker" in the 2019 provincial election.

On 18 November 2018, de Lille launched the "For Good" political movement and website.

On 2 December 2018, de Lille announced the formation of the Good political party in Houghton Estate, a suburb of Johannesburg.

== Leadership ==
In January 2019, Patricia de Lille announced the party's' interim leadership and said that the party's official leadership will be elected after the 2019 elections. The party's national congress was held in November 2023 and re-elected De Lille and Brett Herron as leader and secretary-general, respectively. The leadership that was elected at the national congress are as follows:

Position	Name
Leader	Patricia de Lille
National Chairperson	Matthew Cook
Deputy National Chairperson	Thabo Charles Pheku
Secretary-General	Brett Herron
Deputy Secretary-General	Suzette Little

== Election campaign ==
At the launch of the political party, de Lille said that the manifesto of the party and premier candidates would be announced in early 2019. The party is registered with the Independent Electoral Commission (IEC) and contested the 2019 national and provincial elections in all of the South African provinces.

On 5 February 2019, the party launched its manifesto. The party's manifesto focused on key issues, such as the reduction of the size of the national cabinet, the prosecution of corrupt individuals and the scrapping of the controversial e-tolls in Gauteng.

== Collaboration with Rise Mzansi ==
In August 2024, Axolile Notywala, Rise Mzansi's candidate for Premier of the Western Cape during the 2024 Western Cape provincial election, was appointed by Good to fill a vacancy in the City of Cape Town council. Rise Mzansi stated that the arrangement "cements the two parties' commitment to revive conversations about realigning social democratic politics" and did not rule out the possibility of a merger, while Good's Brett Herron said that "we are confident that this is only the beginning of a much broader and richer project".

== Merger ==
On 5 October 2025, the party announced its merger with Rise Mzansi and Build One South Africa to form the new Unite for Change party, which was intended to be registered to contest the 2026 local government elections. Good, along with Rise Mzansi and Build One South Africa, will continue to exist independently until the next national election scheduled for 2029, when they will fully merge.

The merger was put on hold in April 2026, with the three parties stating that "it cannot be implemented effectively under the pressure of an election campaign. As a result, the parties have determined that the best option is to contest the 2026 local government elections individually and pursue consolidation afterward".

== Election results ==
The party gained two seats in the National Assembly of South Africa and one seat in the Western Cape Provincial Parliament. The two parliamentary seats were filled by de Lille and Shaun August, while the provincial parliament seat was filled by Brett Herron. De Lille has subsequently accepted the position of Minister of Public Works and Infrastructure in the cabinet of South Africa but has stated that Good will remain an opposition party.

On 17 July 2019, Good contested its first municipal by-election in the George Local Municipality. The party's candidate was Mercia Draghoender, who defected from the DA to Good. She had previously served as a ward councillor and the mayor of the municipality. The media speculated that this election would be an upset since Draghoender had good name recognition. The African National Congress also had a good chance of winning this election due to vote splitting. The DA ended up retaining the ward but with a majority of only eight votes. Good was in second place with the ANC in third out of several parties that contested the by-election.

The party won its first local government ward in a by-election in November 2020, in Ward 27 (Pacaltzdorp) taking a ward in George from the Democratic Alliance. Richard "Yster" Hector winning the ward for GOOD, ending up by being GOOD's first-ever elected ward councillor.

In May 2024, Agang SA endorsed Good for the May 29 national and provincial elections and encouraged its members and supporters to cast their votes for the party on the national, regional and provincial ballots.

In the 2024 general election Good won one seat in Parliament (National Assembly) and Patricia de Lille was the sole Good elected MP.

=== Local elections ===
In the 2021 municipal elections, GOOD ran in five provinces, six metros, and a thousand wards. The party fielded nine mayoral candidates: general secretary Brett Herron in Cape Town, former Springboks coach Peter de Villiers in his home of Drakenstein, as well as Lloyd Phillips in Johannesburg, Sarah Mabotsa in Tshwane, Lawrence Troon in Nelson Mandela Bay, Elizabeth Johnson in Kimberley, Donovan Saptoe in George, Ryan Don in Saldanha Bay, and Sharifa Essop in Beaufort West.

=== National Assembly elections ===
Election	Party leader	Total votes	Share of vote	Seats	+/–	Government
2019	Patricia de Lille	70,408	0.40%	2 / 400	New	Second Cabinet of Cyril Ramaphosa
2024	Patricia de Lille	29,501	(Note: From 2024, seats in the National Assembly are determined by a combination of the national ballot, and the nine regional ballots. Only the national ballot figures are shown here.)0.18%	1 / 400	▼1	Third Cabinet of Cyril Ramaphosa

=== National Council of Provinces ===
Election	Total # of seats won	+/–
2019	0 / 90	0
2024	0 / 90	0

=== Provincial elections ===
Election	Eastern Cape		Free State		Gauteng		Kwazulu-Natal		Limpopo		Mpumalanga		North-West		Northern Cape		Western Cape	
Election	%	Seats	%	Seats	%	Seats	%	Seats	%	Seats	%	Seats	%	Seats	%	Seats	%	Seats
2019	0.24%	0/63	0.08%	0/30	0.20%	0/73	0.11%	0/80	0.03%	0/49	0.06%	0/30	0.12%	0/33	0.83%	0/30	3.01%	1/42
2024	0.09%	0/73	0.06%	0/30	0.13%	0/80	0.06%	0/80	0.02%	0/64	0.04%	0/51	0.06%	0/38	0.47%	0/30	1.13%	1/42
