= Pan Africanist Congress of Azania =

Political party in South Africa

- Abbreviation: PAC
- President: Mzwanele Nyhontso
- Secretary-General: Apa Pooe
- Deputy: Victor Serakalala
- Founder: Robert Mangaliso Sobukwe
- Founded: 6 April 1959
- Split from: African National Congress
- Headquarters: Khotso House, 7th Floor, Office 725-731, 62 Marshal Street Johannesburg, Gauteng
- Student wing: Pan Africanist Student Movement of Azania
- Youth wing: Pan Africanist Youth Congress of Azania
- Women's wing: Pan Africanist Women's Organisation
- Paramilitary wing: Azanian People's Liberation Army (POQO) (formerly) (integrated into SANDF)
- High school wing: Pan Africanist Student Organization (PASO)
- Pupil wing: Pan Africanist Student Organization (PASO)
- Ideology: Black nationalism Pan-Africanism; African socialism
- Political position: Left-wing
- National affiliation: Progressive Caucus (2024)
- Colours: Black; Green; Gold
- Slogan: Izwe Lethu!! Our Land!!
- National Assembly: 1 / 400
- National Council of Provinces: 0 / 90
- Pan-African Parliament: 0 / 5
- Cape Town City Council: 1 / 231

Party flag

Website
- www.pacofazania.org.za

The Pan Africanist Congress of Azania, often shortened to the Pan Africanist Congress (PAC), is a South African pan-Africanist political party. It was founded by an Africanist group, led by Robert Sobukwe, that broke away from the African National Congress (ANC) in 1959, as the PAC objected to the ANC's theory that "the land belongs to all who live in it, both white and black" and also rejected a multiracialist worldview, instead advocating a South Africa based on African nationalism.

== History ==
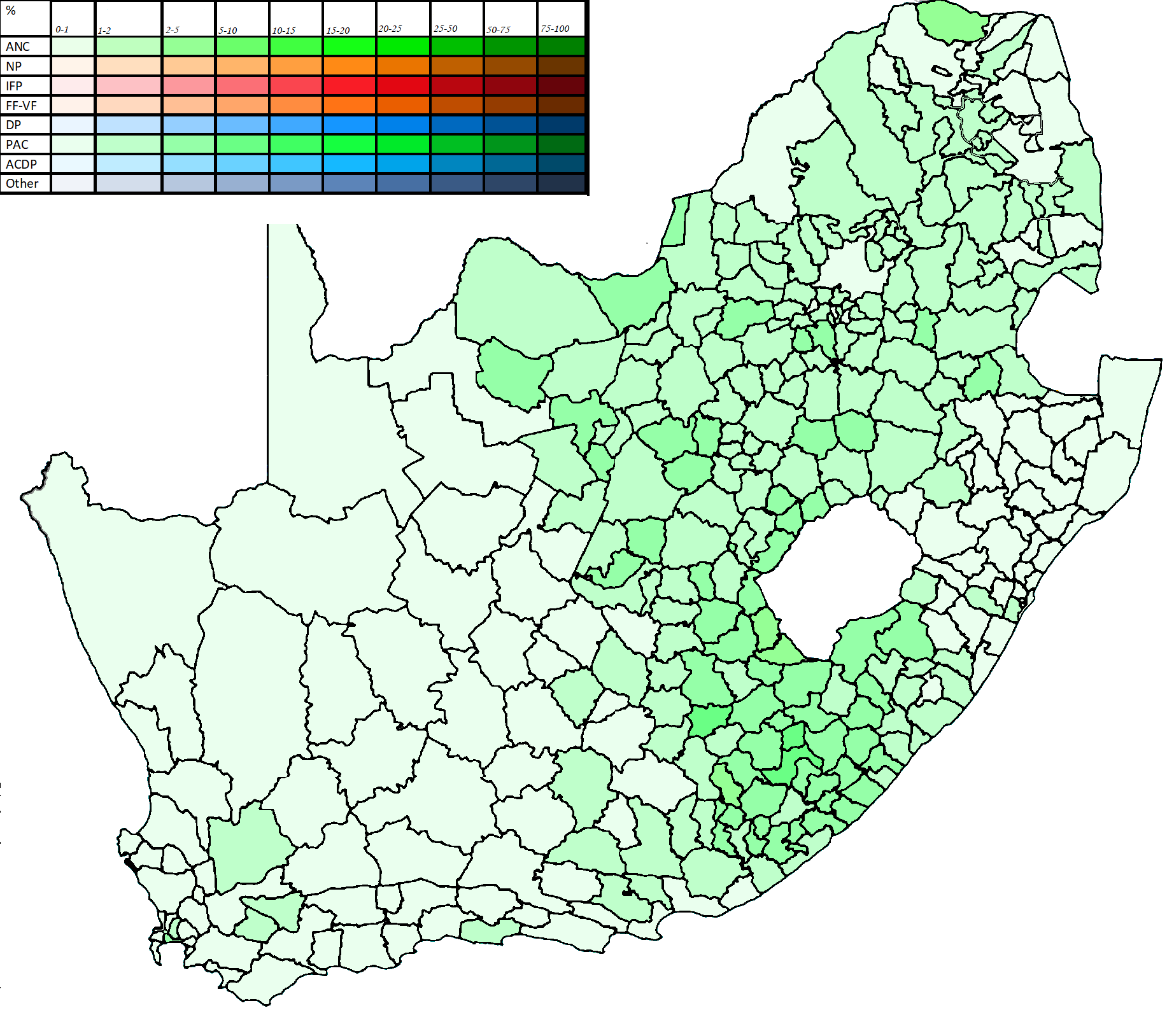
Share of PAC votes per district in the 1994 election

The PAC was formally launched on 6 April 1959 at Orlando Communal Hall in Soweto. A number of African National Congress (ANC) members broke away because they objected to the substitution of the 1949 Programme of Action with the Freedom Charter adopted in 1955, which used multiracialist language as opposed to Africanist affirmations. The PAC at the time considered South Africa to be an African state by an "inalienable right of the indigenous African people" and refused to support equal rights of the oppressed and oppressor, exploiter and exploited, the land dispossessor and landless Africans - "the dispossessed." They insisted that the historic mission of the PAC of the people of Azania was "the complete freedom, liberation, and independence of Afrika." This entailed political, social, economic, and military independence. Robert Sobukwe was elected as the first president, and Potlako Leballo as the Secretary General.

On 21 March 1960, the PAC organised a campaign against pass laws. People gathered in the townships of Sharpeville and Langa where Sobukwe and other top leaders were arrested and later convicted for incitement. Sobukwe was sentenced to three years and Potlako Leballo to two years in prison. Sobukwe died in Kimberley, Cape Province, 1978 of lung cancer. Immediately after the Sharpeville massacre the National Party Government banned both the ANC and PAC on 8 April 1960. The PAC responded by founding its armed wing, the Azanian People's Liberation Army.

== Ideology ==
The PAC followed the idea that the South African Government should be constituted by the African people owing their allegiance only to Africa, as stated by Sobukwe in the inaugural speech of the PAC:

"We aim, politically, at government of the Africans by the Africans, for the Africans, with everybody who owes his only loyalty to Africa and who is prepared to accept the democratic rule of an African majority being regarded as an African."

It was Pan-Africanism with three principles of African nationalism, socialism, and continental unity. Its body of ideas drew largely from the teachings of Anton Lembede, George Padmore, Marcus Garvey, Martin Delany, Kwame Nkrumah, and W. E. B. Du Bois.

The PAC initially advocated for a form of "Africanist Socialist Democracy", based on African and Black Identity, with the aim of creating a South Africa (which they would rename Azania) for Black South Africans, to the exclusion of other nationalities or ethnicities. Unlike the African National Congress's view on socialism, the PAC was stated to have rejected the concept of class oppression, instead focusing exclusively on national liberation. Nevertheless, their initial manifesto lists the "black working class" as the "driving force in the struggle" against white capitalists and "reactionary" middle-class groups. These socialist elements were strongly toned down by the 1990s, instead adopting a more "conservative" stance that sought not to restrict market forces and a commitment not to implement socialism "for the sake of it". The Pan Africanist Youth Congress of Azania described the new program as the "work of an element which is on the CIA payroll". However, by April 1992, the PAC's party leadership in the Annual Congress no longer showed opposition to taking part in the multiracial negotiations to end the apartheid.

The PAC historically rejected Marxism, opposed communism (though it itself had borrowed from some Maoist tenets), and opposed the inclusion of ethnic minorities within the liberation struggle, instead advocating black liberation exclusively within a Black nationalist concept.

== Leadership struggles ==
The PAC has been beset by infighting and has had numerous changes of leadership since its transition to a political party. In 1996, Clarence Makwetu, who led the party in the 1994 elections, was removed on the basis of "bringing the party into disrepute".

In August 2013, the PAC elected Alton Mphethi as president, after previous leader Letlapa Mphahlele was expelled in May amidst allegations of attempting to cause division in the party, financial impropriety and poor quality leadership.

A faction of the PAC continued to regard Mphahlele as leader. The matter was resolved in the courts, with Mpheti eventually being confirmed as party leader for the 2014 election.

Mpheti has since been charged with murder for the death of a Swazi national, Mthunzi Mavundla, and sentenced for R3 million school transport fraud.

Luthando Mbinda was elected president at the 2014 congress in Botshabelo, while Letlapa Mphahlele was elected in July 2015 in Manguang. Mbinda claimed that Mphahlele's election was not valid, as he was not a valid member, while Mphahlele challenged his expulsion in court.

The Independent Electoral Commission suspended the party's statutory fund's allocations until there was clarity about who led the party, and in October 2015 the high court confirmed that Mbinda was the recognised leader.

Conflict then arose between Mbinda and Chief Executive Officer Narius Moloto. Mbinda was subsequently charged by the PAC and later expelled for bringing the organisation into disrepute. Narius Moloto was elected party leader in December 2017.

In 2019, Mbinda opened two bank accounts and arranged for the Parliamentary Finance Department to pay monies owing to the PAC to these accounts. He handed himself over to the Hawks in 2021 and was convicted of fraud in 2025.

Infighting continued after the 2019 elections, with leader Narius Moloto unilaterally dissolving the party's structures, a decision which was later set aside by the courts.

In August 2019, in Limpopo, one faction elected Moloto as leader, while a week later, in Bloemfontein, another faction elected Mzwanele Nyhontso as leader. In October 2019, the Independent Electoral Commission recognised Nyhontso as the legitimate party leader.

In November 2020, speaker of the National Assembly Thandi Modise received notice that the PAC had expelled Nyhontso and notified him that he had therefore lost his seat in parliament as the PAC's sole representative. The opposing faction got a court order in December 2020 to reinstate Nyhontso, pending a court order challenging his removal from the party.

In August 2021, the court confirmed that Moloto's election was invalid, confirming Nyhontso as president, and in September 2021, Nyhontso was again sworn in as the party's sole MP.

In 2024, Nyhontso was again the sole PAC elected MP. He joined the Government of National Unity as Minister of Land Reform and Rural Development after the ANC lost its majority in parliament.

== Election results ==
=== National elections ===
Election	Total votes	Share of vote	Seats	+/–	Government
1994	243,478	1.25%	5 / 400	New	Opposition
1999	113,125	0.78%	3 / 400	▼2	Opposition
2004	113,512	0.73%	3 / 400	0	Opposition
2009	48,530	0.27%	1 / 400	▼2	Opposition
2014	37,784	0.21%	1 / 400	0	Opposition
2019	32,677	0.19%	1 / 400	0	Opposition
2024	36,716	0.23% (Note: From 2024, seats in the National Assembly are determined by a combination of the national ballot, and the nine regional ballots. Only the national ballot figures are shown here.)	1 / 400	0	Third Cabinet of Cyril Ramaphosa

=== Provincial elections ===
Election	Eastern Cape		Free State		Gauteng		Kwazulu-Natal		Limpopo		Mpumalanga		North-West		Northern Cape		Western Cape	
Election	%	Seats	%	Seats	%	Seats	%	Seats	%	Seats	%	Seats	%	Seats	%	Seats	%	Seats
1994	2.04%	1/56	1.81%	0/30	1.47%	1/86	0.73%	1/81	1.27%	1/40	1.63%	0/30	1.73%	0/30	0.93%	0/30	1.06%	0/42
1999	1.14%	1/63	1.15%	0/30	0.73%	0/73	0.26%	0/80	1.41%	1/49	0.66%	0/30	0.74%	0/33	0.66%	0/30	0.49%	0/42
2004	1.00%	1/63	1.18%	0/30	0.85%	1/73	0.19%	0/80	0.94%	0/49	0.69%	0/30	0.84%	0/33	0.43%	0/30	0.42%	0/42
2009	0.54%	0/63	0.33%	0/30	0.31%	0/73	0.07%	0/80	0.53%	0/49	0.32%	0/30	0.26%	0/33	0.22%	0/30	0.23%	0/42
2014	0.44%	0/63	0.21%	0/30	0.26%	0/73	0.08%	0/80	0.29%	0/49	0.23%	0/30	0.14%	0/33	0.11%	0/30	0.17%	0/42
2019	0.41%	0/63	0.17%	0/30	0.24%	0/73	0.07%	0/80	0.17%	0/49	0.14%	0/30	0.11%	0/33	0.11%	0/30	0.19%	0/42
2024	0.51%	0/73	0.24%	0/30	0.29%	0/80	0.11%	0/80	0.24%	0/64	0.16%	0/51	0.15%	0/38	0.16%	0/30	0.31%	0/42

=== Municipal elections ===
Election	Votes	%
1995–96	104,455	1.2%
2000		1.2%
2006	306,747	1.2%
2011	118,822	0.4%
2016	74,607	0.19%

== See also ==
- Azanian National Youth Unity
- Azanian People's Liberation Army
- Freedom Charter
- History of South Africa
