= 2024 Western Cape provincial election =

- 29 May 2024

All 42 seats to the Western Cape Provincial Parliament 22 seats needed for a majority
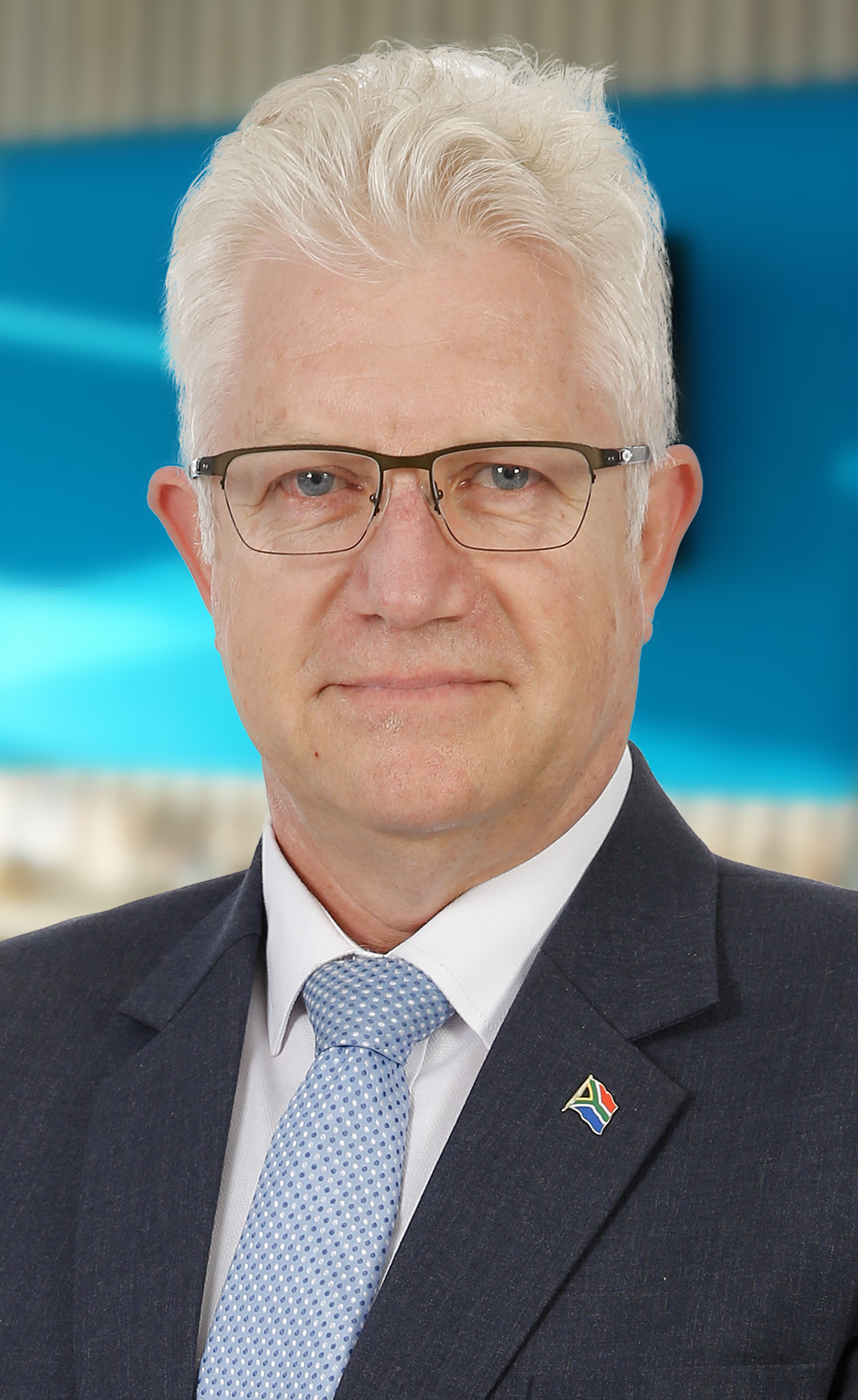

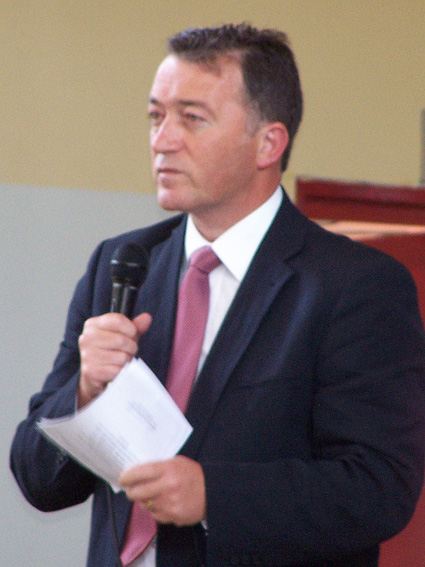

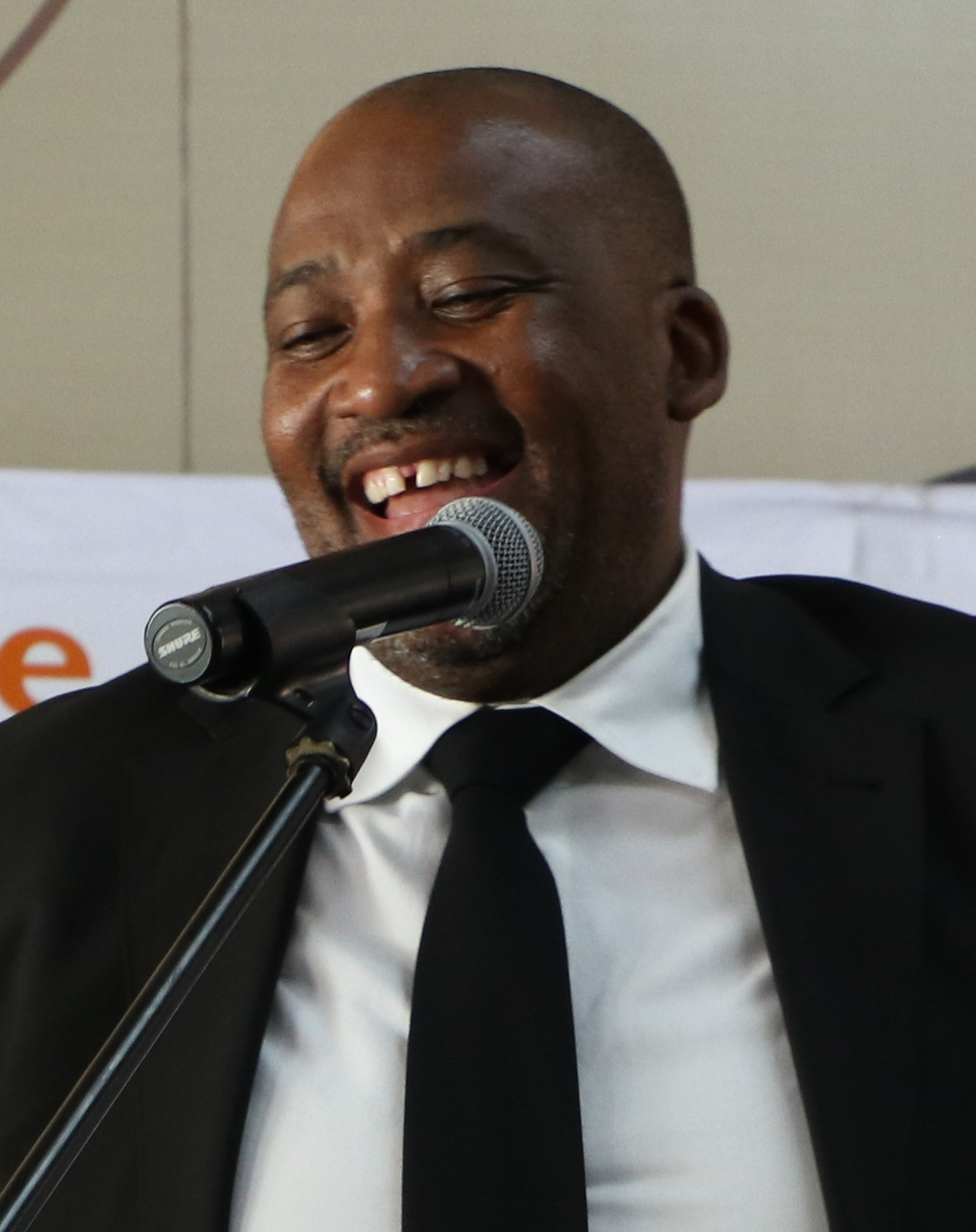

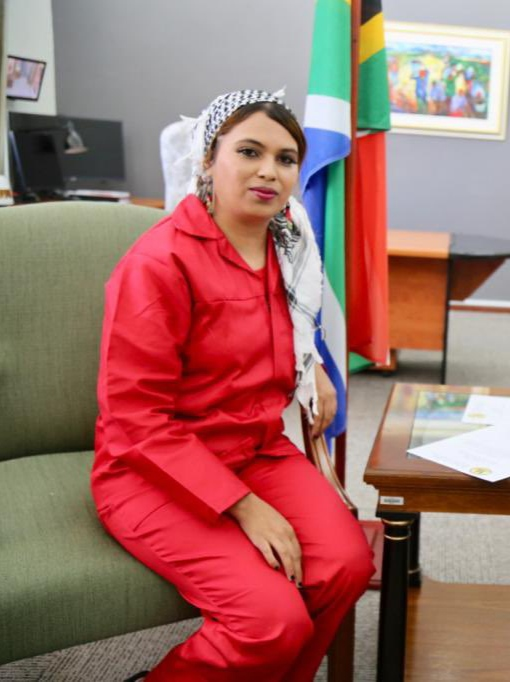

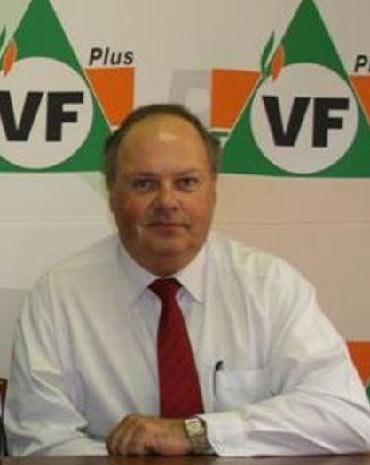
	First party	Second party	Third party
Candidate	Alan Winde	Cameron Dugmore	Gayton McKenzie
Party	DA	ANC	Patriotic Alliance
Last election	55.45%	28.64%	Did not contest
Seats before	24	12	0
Seats won	24	8	3
Seat change	Steady	▼4	▲3
Popular vote	1,088,423	384,853	153,607
Percentage	55.30%	19.55%	7.80%
Swing	▼0.15%	▼9.09%	▲7.80%
	Fourth party	Fifth party	Sixth party
Candidate	Aishah Cassiem	Fadiel Adams	Corné Mulder
Party	Economic Freedom Fighters	National Coloured Congress	Freedom Front Plus
Last election	4.04%	Did not contest	Did not contest
Seats before	2	0	1
Seats won	2	1	1
Seat change	Steady	▲1	Steady
Popular vote	104,354	46,770	28,471
Percentage	5.30%	2.38%	1.45%
Swing	▲1.26%	▲2.28%	▼0.11%
Results by municipality
DA
40 – 50%
50 – 60%
60 – 70%
Premier before election
Alan Winde
Democratic Alliance
Elected Premier
Alan Winde
Democratic Alliance

The 2024 Western Cape provincial election was held on 29 May 2024, concurrently with the 2024 South African general election, to elect the 42 members of the 7th Western Cape Provincial Parliament.

== Background ==
The previous provincial election was won by the ruling Democratic Alliance (DA), but with a reduced majority of 55.45%, down from 59.38% in the 2014 election. The party lost two seats and achieved a majority of 24 seats in the legislature. The Official Opposition African National Congress (ANC) declined from 32.89% to 28.64%, and also lost two seats. The Economic Freedom Fighters (EFF) significantly grew, going from 2.11% to 4.04%, and, consequently, gained one seat. The newly-formed Good received 3.11% of the vote and won a seat. The African Christian Democratic Party (ACDP) grew to 2.66% and retained its sole seat. The Freedom Front Plus (FF+) and Al Jama-ah also won one seat each.

== Issues ==
=== Devolution of policing ===
Over the last term of government, the devolution of policing power has become a key issue between the Western Cape Government and the Minister of Police, Bheki Cele. The Western Cape Government argues that the Minister has the power to devolve policing, but the Minister denies having the power of devolution, saying that "the centralisation of the SAPS [is] in line with the Department [of Police's] constitutional mandate to prevent, combat and investigate crime..." Section 205 of the Constitution of South Africa sets out policing policy in South Africa, noting that the police service "must be structured to function in national [and] provincial...spheres of government." The Constitution gives provincial executives the power to monitor police conduct within their respective provinces, as well as the responsibility for policing functions in three cases; namely Chapter 11 of the Constitution, assigned to provincial government in terms of national legislation and allocated to it in national policing policy.

=== The African Growth and Opportunity Act ===
The Western Cape Premier, Alan Winde and a Western Cape Government delegation made a trip to the United States to detail the possible impact that a loss of preferential access to the U.S. market through the African Growth and Opportunity Act would have on the agricultural industry in the province, largely in response to increased U.S. scrutiny over the South African government's increased military co-operation with Russia and China and potential co-operation with Iran. The Leader of the Opposition in the Western Cape Provincial Parliament, Cameron Dugmore (ANC) accused the provincial government of wasting taxpayer's money, saying "this trip was about the DA's desperation to secure support for the 2024 elections by creating a certain narrative about this matter".

== Results ==
Party	Votes	%	+/–	Seats	+/–
Democratic Alliance	1,088,423	55.58	–0.1	24	0
African National Congress	384,853	19.65	–9.1	8	–4
Patriotic Alliance	153,607	7.84	New	3	New
Economic Freedom Fighters	104,354	5.33	+1.3	2	0
National Coloured Congress	46,770	2.39	New	1	New
Freedom Front Plus	28,471	1.45	-0.1	1	0
Al Jama-ah	25,537	1.30	+0.4	1	0
African Christian Democratic Party	25,363	1.30	-1.4	1	0
Good	22,207	1.13	-1.9	1	0
uMkhonto we Sizwe	11,263	0.58	New	0	New
Rise Mzansi	9,954	0.51	New	0	New
Africa Restoration Alliance	8,318	0.42	New	0	New
Build One South Africa	8,028	0.41	New	0	New
Pan Africanist Congress	6,151	0.31	+0.1	0	0
United Democratic Movement	5,933	0.30	0	0	0
ActionSA	5,788	0.30	New	0	New
African Transformation Movement	5,581	0.28	0	0	0
Referendum Party	5,110	0.26	New	0	New
People's Movement for Change	5,074	0.26	New	0	New
Allied Movement for Change	5,065	0.26	New	0	New
Allied of Citizens for Change	2,430	0.12	New	0	New
Total	1,958,280	100.00	–	42	–
Valid votes	1,958,280	99.25			
Invalid/blank votes	14,874	0.75			
Total votes	1,973,154	100.00			
Registered voters/turnout	3,317,072	59.48			
Source: Daily Maverick and News24

== Aftermath ==
The DA retained its majority, while the ANC lost four seats, with the Patriotic Alliance and the National Coloured Congress, both new parties, gaining seats at the expense of the ANC, and other incumbent parties retaining their share of seats from the previous Provincial Parliament. Winde was re-elected premier by a vote of 24-18.

== See also ==
- List of members of the 7th Western Cape Provincial Parliament
