= 2026 South African municipal elections =

- 4 November 2026

All councillors for all 8 metropolitan municipalities All councillors for all 205 local municipalities 40% of councillors for all 44 district municipalities
- Registered: 29,230,808
- Turnout: 52.3% (▲6.4%)
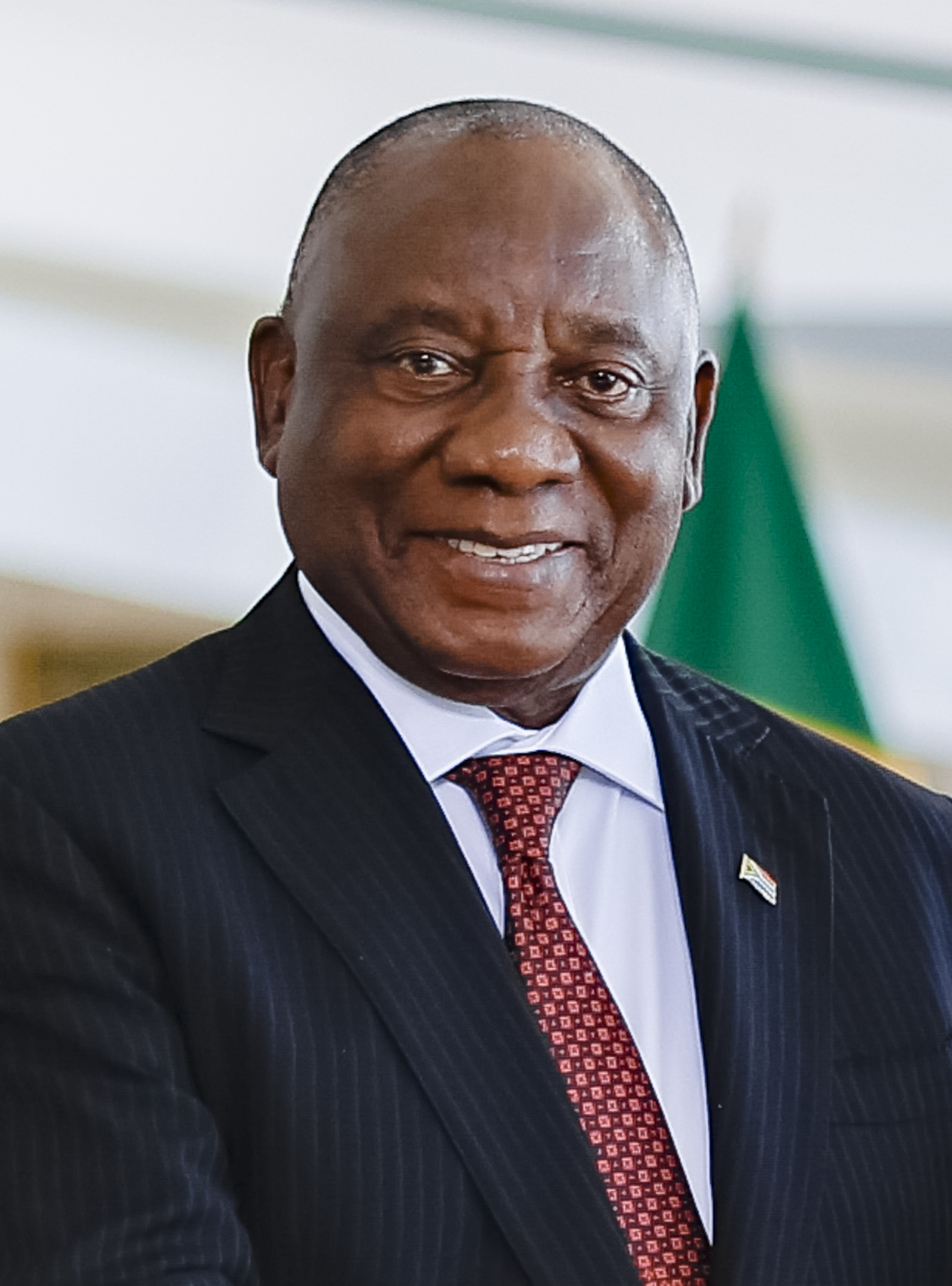

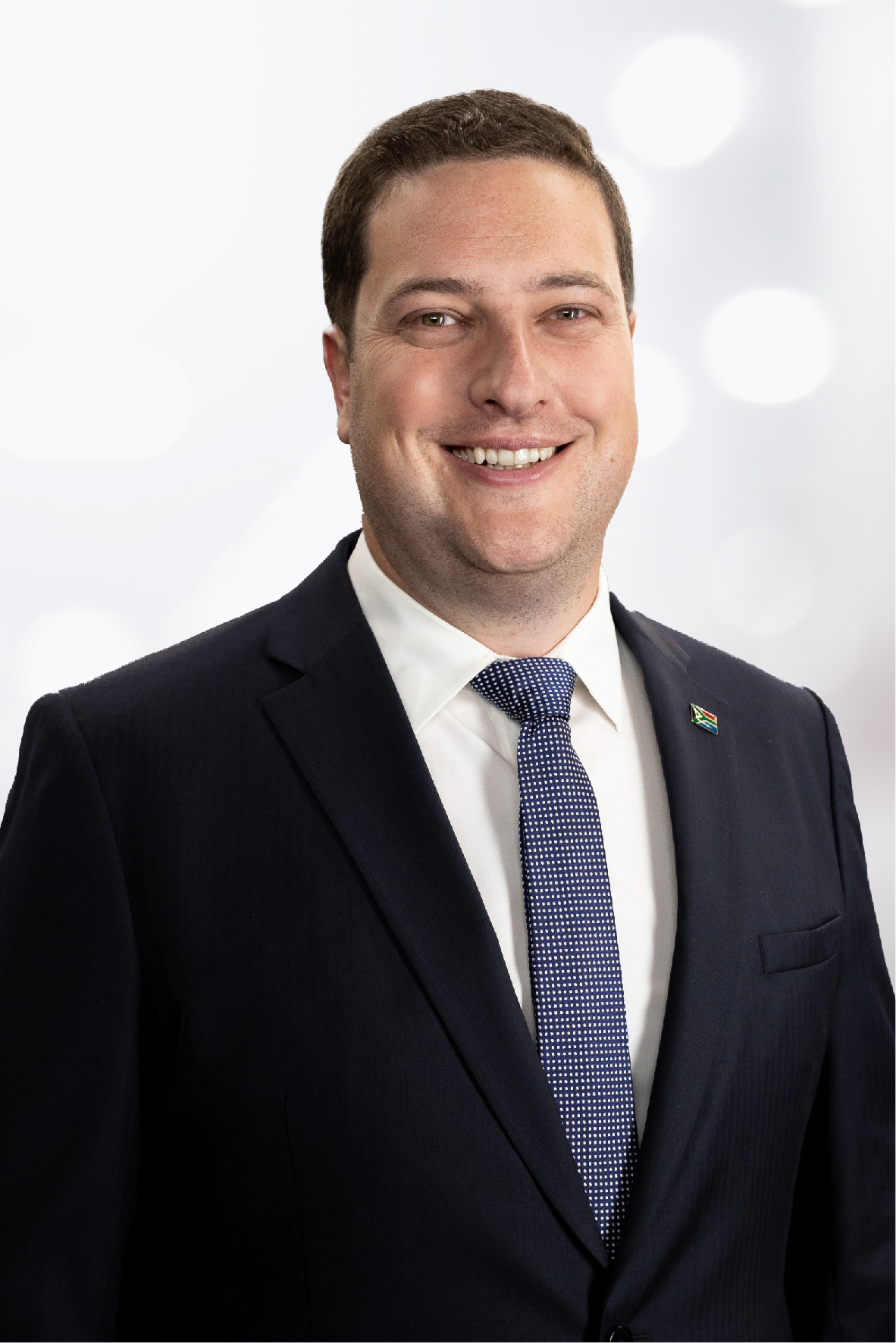

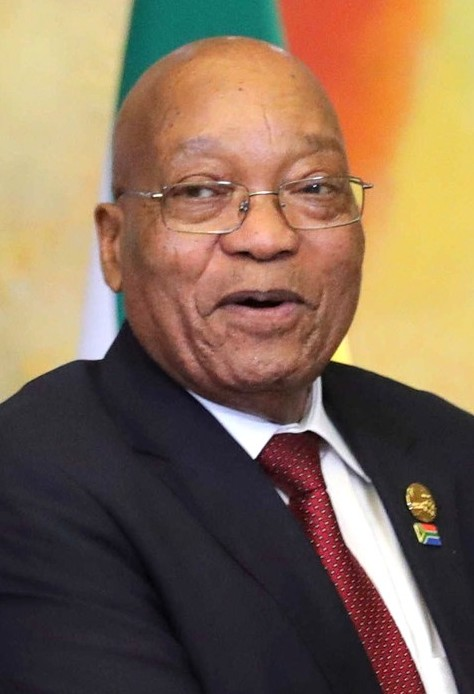

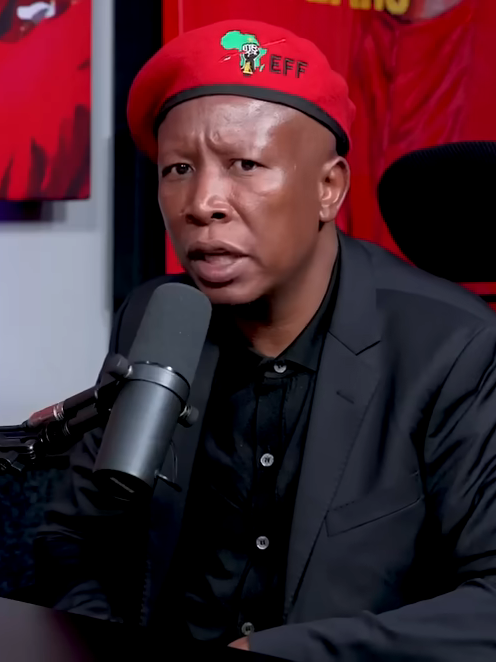

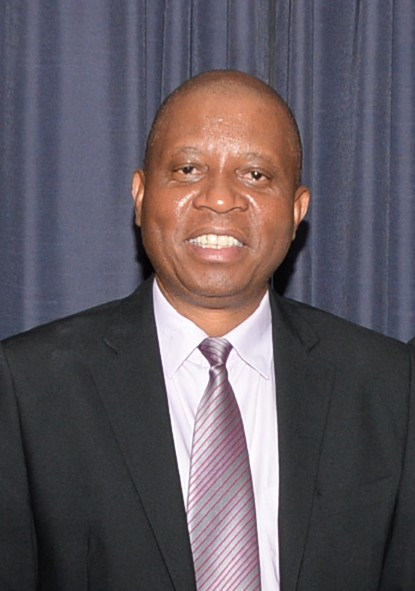

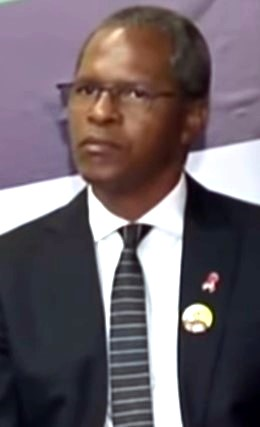

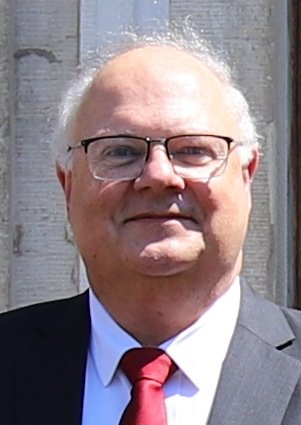

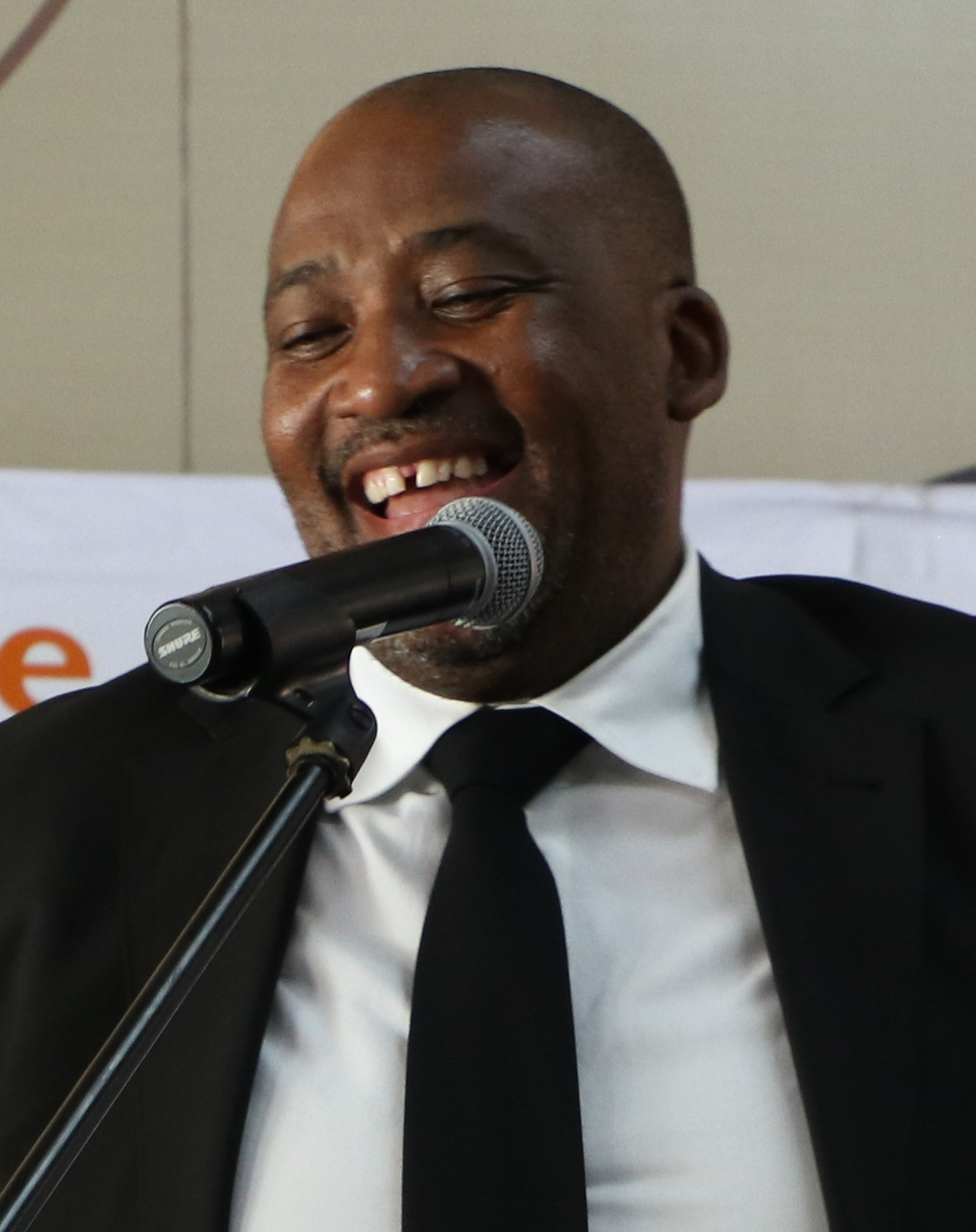
Leader	Cyril Ramaphosa	Geordin Hill-Lewis	Jacob Zuma (Note: Declared ineligible on 21 May 2024. However, he remained on the ballot papers.)
Party	ANC	DA	MK
Vote percentage	30.75%	24.65%	9.77%
Swing	▼14.83%	▲2.98%	▲9.77%
Councilors	3,246	1,695	785
Councilors ±	▼1,299	▲281	▲785
Leader	Julius Malema	Herman Mashaba	Velenkosini Hlabisa
Party	EFF	ActionSA	IFP
Vote percentage	6.22%	5.67%	4.69%
Swing	▼4.09%	▲3.34%	▼0.95%
Councilors	588	313	488
Councilors ±	▼392	▲223	▼56
Leader	Corné Mulder	Solly Mapaila	Gayton McKenzie
Party	VF+	SACP	PA
Vote percentage	2.99%	2.38%	1.97%
Swing	▲0.65%	▲2.38%	▲1.01%
Councilors	249	271	192
Councilors ±	▲29	▲271	▲117
- Results by municipality (left) and by province (right)

The 2026 South African municipal elections were held on 4 November 2026 across South Africa, to elect councils for all district, metropolitan and local municipalities in each of the country's nine provinces.

The total number of voting districts heading into the elections was 4,488. A total of 10,526 council seats across South Africa's local governments were contested in the elections. For local elections in SA, all metro and local council seats are elected directly, as are 40% of district seats. The other 60% of district seats are appointed after the election by their constituent local councils. A total of 620 political parties registered to participate in the elections.

As of August 2026, approximately 29 million South Africans were registered to vote, according to the Electoral Commission. The largest age category for registered voters in late 2025 was 30 through 39. In terms of gender, 55% of registered voters were female.

A significant number of new voters registered in the lead up to the elections. The Commission's two voter registration weekends, held in June and August 2026 respectively, recorded over 754,000 new voter registrations, 46% of which came from those under 29 years old.

On 9 November 2026, it was reported that a total of 15,269,880 people voted in the elections, resulting in a 52.3% turnout – a 6.4% increase over the last local elections.

In terms of total proportional representation (PR) votes cast nationally, the African National Congress (ANC) lost over 15% compared to the 2021 local election, obtaining 30.88%. The second-largest party, the Democratic Alliance (DA), gained 3%, securing a total of 24.75%.

Numerous smaller parties had significant losses, including the Economic Freedom Fighters (EFF), which lost 4.21% to secure 6.24%; and the Inkatha Freedom Party (IFP), which lost 1.16% to secure 4.69%. Meanwhile, the uMkhonto weSizwe Party (MK), which contested for the first time, secured 9.82%. ActionSA made significant gains, increasing 3.41% to secure 6.02%. Likewise, the South African Communist Party (SACP), which contested for the first time, secured 2.29%.

== Background ==
These were the first elections to be held following the formation of the multi-party coalition Government of National Unity (GNU) – the Third Cabinet of Cyril Ramaphosa in 2024, after that year's general election. With elections held every five years, the fifth term of local government in South Africa ended on 1 November 2026. On 13 November 2024, South African Minister in The Presidency, Khumbudzo Ntshavheni, announced in Cape Town that the elections would be held between 2 November 2026 and 1 February 2027.

As with all major governmental elections in South Africa, the 2026 municipal elections were organized by the country's independent election management body, the Electoral Commission of South Africa. This is as per the body's establishment under chapter nine of the Constitution, and as per its obligations in Section 190 of the Constitution, and duties in Section 5 of the Electoral Commission Act, 1996.

The South African cabinet approved the establishment of an Inter-Ministerial Committee (IMC) that oversaw preparations for the 2026 Local Government Elections. The IMC was convened by the Minister of Cooperative Governance and Traditional Affairs, Velenkosini Hlabisa, and consisted of several government departments that are key to ensuring the delivery of successful elections. The IMC worked with the Electoral Commission of South Africa (IEC) and other relevant bodies to ensure that the process leading to the elections was smooth and peaceful.

=== Coalitions Bill ===
Coalitions (multi-party governments) have become significantly more common in South Africa in recent years, especially at the local government level. However, these have not always been long-lasting. Certain local government coalitions since the last municipal elections have resulted in a number of motions of no confidence, factionalism (even within single parties), and a lack of reliable service delivery for constituents in those regions.

As a result of numerous tumultuous municipal coalition governments, the national government drafted the Local Government: Municipal Structures Amendment Bill (B23-2026). According to the Cabinet, the new legislation is aimed at providing, "a clear legislative framework for the formation of coalition governments, and to establish mechanisms to minimize coalition-related challenges in local government".

It is unknown whether the bill will pass before the 2026 elections. The bill was approved by Cabinet at its 29 July 2026 meeting, making it ready for tabling in Parliament.

In August 2026, the Department of Cooperative Governance and Traditional Affairs gazetted an explanatory summary of the latest version of the bill. The statement confirmed the bill aims to:

- Promote accountable coalition governance,
- Reduce political instability, and
- Support the uninterrupted delivery of services to communities.

The bill was introduced to Parliament on 18 August 2026.

=== Election Commission activities ===
In 2025, the IEC acknowledged the effectiveness of online voter self-registration in South Africa, which was rolled out during the 2021 municipal elections.

In April 2025, the IEC announced that 258,838 new voters had registered through its various platforms, and that the majority of them were young people.

As is standard in South African elections, political parties received public funding for the 2026 South African municipal elections. Over R355 million from the national budget for the 2024 financial year was provided to 20 political parties by the IEC.

The Electoral Commission noted a decline in political fundraising activity, with fewer parties declaring donations exceeding the R100,000 threshold (as required by South African law) than in the period leading up to the 2024 general election.

South Africa uses a system of physical ballots for all of its elections, and has not used electronic voting before. In April 2025, the IEC confirmed that no form of e-voting would be used in the 2026 municipal elections. This followed a 3-day conference, held by the Commission, which started a national discussion on the feasibility and possible implementation for future elections.

The Chief Director of the National Treasury's Public Finance Division, Gillian Wilson, said at a conference in March 2025 that it should not be assumed that e-voting would save money during elections. She further stated that it is likely that e-voting would be a significant expense, and that a thorough cost analysis should be conducted before a decision is made.

Wilson also noted that costs for national and provincial elections had increased by 294% from 1994 to 2024, and for local elections by 193% from 2001 to 2021. Factors for the increases include inflation, campaign expenses, and logistics.

In the runup to the 2026 elections, the Electoral Commission launched voter registration services via WhatsApp, as well as a new online nomination system for candidates and parties.

==== Wards ====
For municipal elections, South African voters submit ballots within their ward, which is based on the area in which they primarily reside (and therefore register to vote in). Voters are represented by a particular Ward Councillor, who may or may not have an affiliation with a political party.

Municipal ward boundary demarcations are determined by an independent agency - the Municipal Demarcation Board (MDB). Around a year prior to elections, the MDB publishes its draft boundaries. There is then a 14 day period to challenge these formally, as well as a public consultation process. Subsequently, the MDB hands over the final demarcations to the Electoral Commission.

In May 2025, the MDB said that its work for South African municipal ward delimitations was well on track. At the time, South Africa had 4,468 wards.

Wards are split if the increase in the number of people residing within them exceeds the norm (the increase across all wards during the 5 years between elections). Ward splitting is heavily regulated in South Africa, and as part of the splitting process, motivations for wanting to do so must be put forward and assessed. It must be indicated what the implications of the splitting are, whether doing so would be in contravention of the South African Constitution, and whether people are being segregated or communities are being split up inappropriately.

As part of the process, the MDB embarked on a countrywide ward delimitation public consultation process. Applications for the redetermination of municipal wards are received by the MDB, following which there is a 14-day period during which members of the public can provide objections. Subsequently, it goes to the Board for decision-making. If a ward is split, the Independent Electoral Commission (ECSA) informs voters and re-registers them as part of their new wards. The IEC also confirms that its voting district boundaries align with the wards.

A total of 4,488 wards were confirmed for the 2026 elections. Across these wards, the total number of voting stations (and voting districts) confirmed by the Electoral Commission was 23,699.

The board stated that it would hand over its report on ward delimitations to the IEC in October 2025. The MDB ward handover took place on 10 December 2025.

In December 2025, Minister of Cooperative Governance and Traditional Affairs Velenkosini Hlabisa confirmed that the MDB had increased the number of wards in South Africa by 20, shifting the total to 4,488. He also stated that outer municipal boundaries would remain unchanged ahead of the 2026/27 election, to ensure stability. The Minister emphasised that municipal wards are the foundation of local democracy, providing clear responsibilities for councillors, ensuring fair representation, and enabling municipalities to plan, allocate resources, and deliver services effectively.

As per the new demarcations, ward totals per province were as follows:

Wards by province, 2026 LGE
Province	Number of wards	Change since last LGE
Eastern Cape	703	▲7
Free State	311	▼8
Gauteng	526	▼3
KwaZulu-Natal	921	▲20
Limpopo	568	Steady
Mpumalanga	408	▲8
North West	402	▼1
Northern Cape	233	▲1
Western Cape	416	▲10
Total wards (national)	4,488	▲34

== Voters ==
=== Registration ===
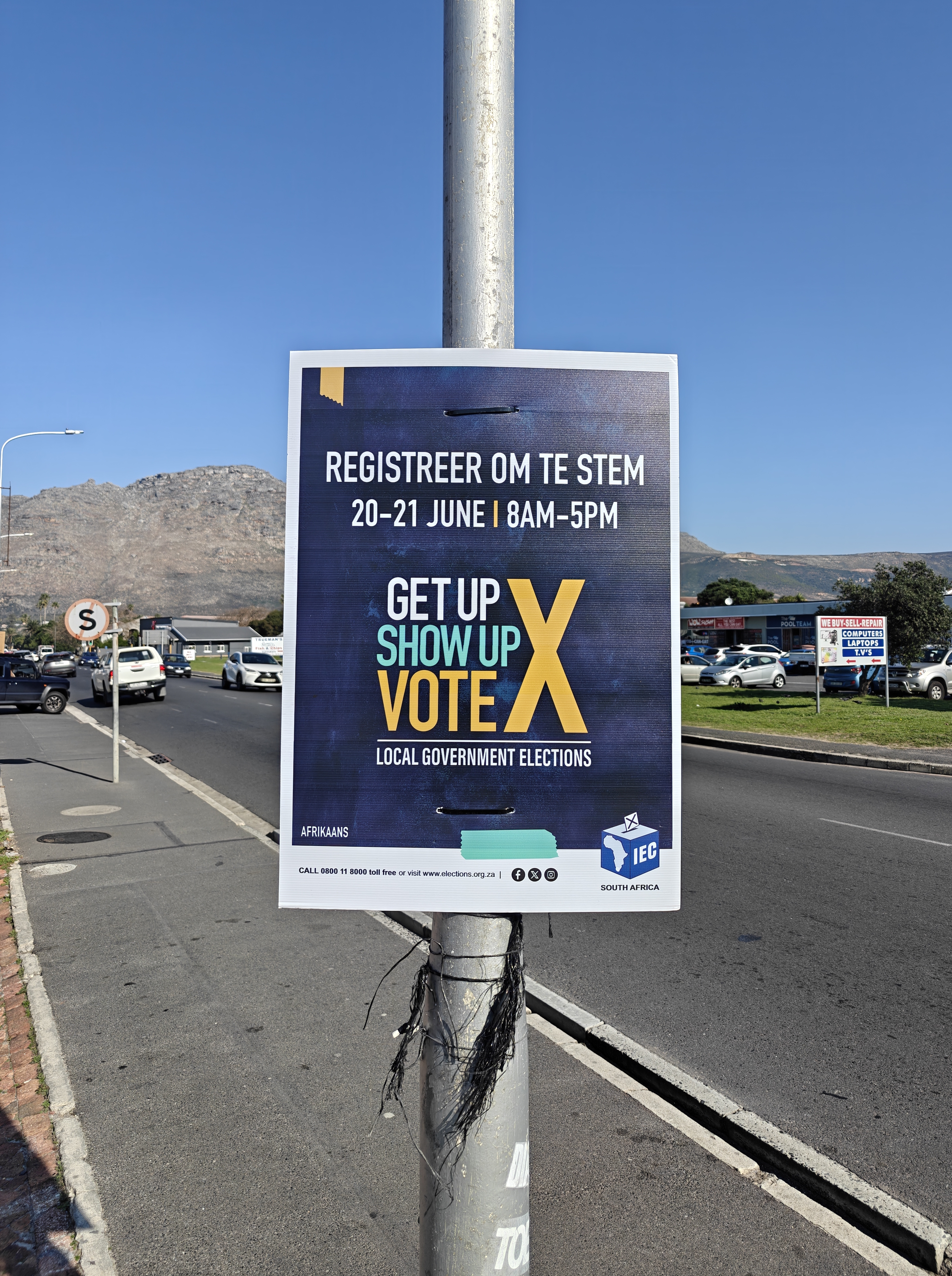
Electoral Commission voter registration sign in Cape Town

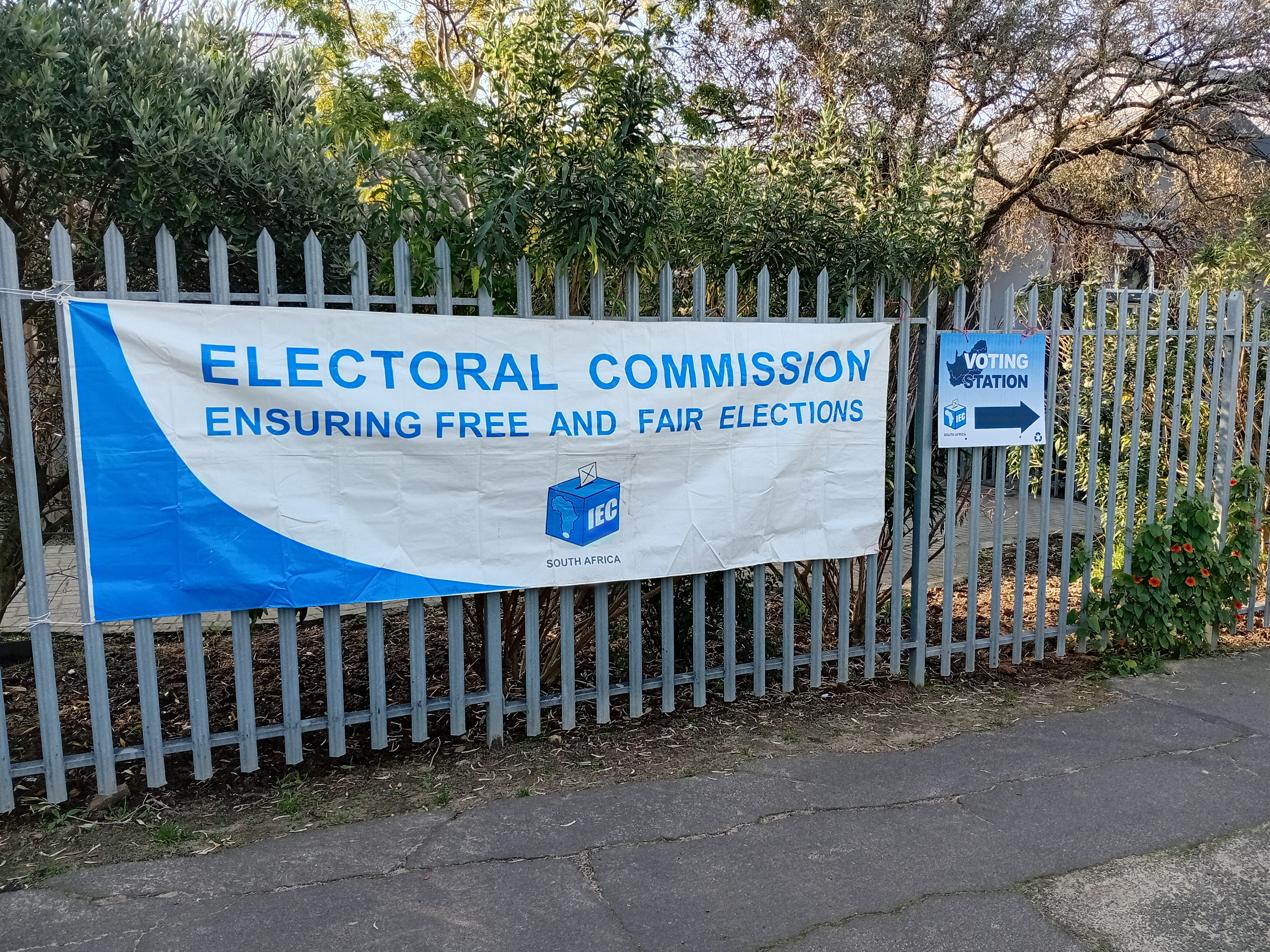
The Paarl Boys' Primary Voting Station in Paarl during Registration Weekend in June 2026

South Africans register to vote once, and remain on the voters' roll indefinitely. Citizens can update their personal details, such as submit a change of address, via an online portal run by the Electoral Commission. Voters register where they live primarily, and vote at a voting station allocated to them, based on their area of registration. Voters can also request to vote from elsewhere, such as if they are on holiday in another city.

In November 2025, the Electoral Commission of South Africa confirmed that from January through September 2025, over 305,200 new voters had registered, while over 60,700 existing voters had updated their registration details. In a speech in November 2025, Deputy Chief Electoral Officer Masego Shiburi encouraged more South Africans to register to vote.

Voter registration weekends were scheduled to take place in June and August 2026. During the registration weekends, a total of 754,000 new voters were registered, around half of which were under the age of 29. In August 2026, the Electoral Commission stated that 2.1 million individuals had been added to the voters roll since the 2024 general elections.

=== Research ===
March 2026 research by Ipsos found that only 38% of South Africans thought their local government was doing a good job. Furthermore, it found that 61% of South Africans were either somewhat or very interested in politics and elections. The research also found that 64% of people intended to vote in the 2026 municipal election. 66% of people said that casting their vote in the election was important to them. Finally, 63% of South Africans said parties should work together at the local government level.

== Electoral system ==
Local government in South Africa consists of municipalities of various types. The largest metropolitan areas are governed by metropolitan municipalities, while the rest of the country is divided into district municipalities, each of which consists of several local municipalities. After the 2016 elections, there were eight metropolitan municipalities, 44 district municipalities and 205 local municipalities.

The councils of metropolitan and local municipalities are elected through a system of mixed-member proportional representation, in which half of the seats in each municipality are elected on the first-past-the-post system in single-member wards and the other half of the seats are allocated according to the proportional representation (PR) system.

The latter takes into account the number of ward seats won by a party and ensures that the final number of seats held by that party is proportional to their percentage of the total vote.

District municipality councils are partly elected by proportional representation (DC 40% votes) and partly appointed by the councils of the constituent local municipalities (DC 60% votes). Voters in both metropolitan and local municipalities elect a single ward candidate as well as a proportional representative in their municipal council.

Residents of municipalities that form part of district councils (that is, excluding metropolitan municipalities) also cast a third vote to elect a proportional representative for their district council in addition to the two votes they cast for their local council.

=== 2026 seats ===
A total of 10,526 council seats across South Africa's local governments were contested in the 2026 elections.

== Political parties ==
A total of 620 political parties registered to contest the 2026 local elections.

With a 45.59% vote share, the African National Congress (ANC) was the largest party in the previous municipal election, which took place in 2021. However, having slipped below 50 per cent, this was the party's worst showing in municipal elections since the introduction of universal suffrage. The ANC has seen a precipitous decline in its vote share in municipal elections since its peak in 2011, when it managed 64.82%.

Some of the steepest drops in the ANC vote share occurred in South Africa's largest cities. In the three Gauteng metropolitan municipalities (Johannesburg, Ekurhuleni and Tshwane) the ANC's vote share dropped into the 30 per cent range, while Buffalo City was the only metropolitan municipality where it managed to win an absolute majority. Despite this decline the ANC still holds six out of the eight mayoral posts in metro areas as well as being a part of the ruling coalition in Tshwane.

South Africa's second-largest party, the Democratic Alliance, saw a decrease in vote share in the 2021 municipal elections; however, it gained 8 municipalities to achieve the highest result in that regard in recent years. After John Steenhuisen's announcement that he will not be seeking reelection as DA federal leader, the party will be contesting these municipal elections under the leadership of Cape Town mayor Geordin Hill-Lewis. The City of Johannesburg is a key metro area for the party.

This is also the first municipal election during which the Democratic Alliance has been part of the South African Government. In prior such elections, the party held the status of official opposition; however, for the 2026 elections, they will be part of the Government of National Unity (GNU) – President Ramaphosa's third Cabinet.

The newly-formed uMkhonto we Sizwe (MK) party will be contesting municipal elections for the first time in 2026. Its leadership has stated that the party is focused on numerous metropolitan areas in Gauteng to unseat the ANC. The party, which is the country's third-largest in terms of seats in Parliament, received 15% of the vote in the 2024 general election.

The South African Communist Party (SACP) has registered as a political party and intends to contest the 2026 elections. While the SACP has historically backed the ANC, it is now running independently. In recent years, the ANC-SACP alliance has fractured, with the SACP becoming increasingly critical of the ANC's economic policies, governance, and handling of corruption scandals. The only time the SACP has contested an election independently of the ANC was during the Metsimaholo Municipality by-elections in 2017.

The IEC initially stated that the SACP did not meet the eligibility requirements to run and instructed the party to deregister itself for the 2026 elections. Along with other parties instructed by the IEC to deregister, the SACP did not meet the statutory requirements, was not represented in any legislative body, had not contested local government elections since its registration, and had failed to renew its registration by the 31 January 2025 deadline. However, the IEC later deemed the SACP fit to contest the election and cleared the party to do so.

=== Party deregistration ===
In April 2025, the IEC announced that, as part of standard administration procedures, it intended to deregister 192 political parties. Of those parties, 136 had made representations to preserve their status as registered parties. 3 political parties asked the IEC to cancel their registrations, and 53 parties did not respond to the invitation to make representations.

The IEC stated at the time that the cancellation of registrations of inactive political parties was necessary to ensure that only active political parties remained on the party register. The Commission also said that the cancellation of inactive parties would free the usage of names, abbreviated names, logos, and color schemes for aspirant parties.

== Timeline ==
=== 2024 ===
- 15 April: An IRR opinion poll showed that for the first time in history, the Democratic Alliance (DA) was more popular among voters than the African National Congress (ANC).
- 6 November: South African Minister in The Presidency, Khumbudzo Ntshavheni, announced in Cape Town that the next municipal elections would be held between 2 November 2026 and 1 February 2027.

=== 2025 ===
- 15 January: ActionSA and the Forum 4 Service Delivery (F4SD) announce a merger, whereby they will contest the upcoming election together under the former's banner, but retain dual membership to protect their existing municipal representation. Herman Mashaba stated that this was a step towards uniting opposition parties to stand against the GNU and the EFF-MK coalition.
- 23 April: The Independent Electoral Commission (IEC) announced in Centurion that it had commenced preparations for the 2026 election. The Commission also announced the political party funding allocation.
- 23 July: After a session at the Cape Town International Convention Centre, the National Assembly passed an Appropriation Bill (budget). This paves the way for the approval of the full schedule of votes for 42 Departmental and other entities, as well as the second reading of the Bill. The Bill easily reached, and significantly surpassed, the required 201-vote simple majority to pass it, with 262 votes in favour. The ANC, DA, GOOD, IFP, PA, FF+, ActionSA, UDM, Al-Jama-ah, BOSA, Rise Mzansi, and PAC voted in favour of the bill, signifying a positive unity within the coalition National Government.
- 31 July: Deputy President Paul Mashatile, a member of the ANC, declared ownership of two luxury properties with a combined value of R65 million. One property worth R37 million is located in Waterfall, Midrand. The other, a R28.9 million home in Constantia, Cape Town, is one that Mashatile previously denied owning, instead saying it was owned by his son-in-law's company. Other properties were also declared to be owned by Mashatile. Mashatile's office stated that no provincial or national Department under his oversight as Deputy President has ever been awarded, been accused of awarding, or investigated for awarding tenders to any companies linked to his family. The Hawks' (Directorate for Priority Crime Investigation) National Spokesperson, Brigadier Thandi Mbambo, confirmed that the unit was investigating corruption-related claims involving funds used to purchase the Constantia home.
- 8 September: Floyd Shivambu announced his new political party, the Afrika Mayibuye Movement, during a media briefing in Johannesburg. Shivambu stated that the party had already been registered in terms of the Electoral Commission Act of 1996, allowing it to contest elections. He further said that the party would contest all wards in the 2026 local government elections.
- 16 September: The Patriotic Alliance (PA) announced that its candidate for Mayor of Johannesburg was the party's Deputy President, Kenny Kunene. This, despite Kunene's existing suspension. The party also announced that, despite being sworn in just 1 month prior, Johannesburg Councilor Liam Jacobs would resign from the position and become the PA's mayoral candidate for Cape Town.
- 20 September: The Democratic Alliance (DA) named Helen Zille as the party's candidate for Mayor of Johannesburg. If elected Mayor, Zille promised better delivery of water, electricity, road repair, and refuse services. She had submitted her application to run on 15 June.
- 26 September: PA Leader Gayton McKenzie stated that his party felt it was part of a coalition where it is not respected, and would therefore withdraw from the Government of National Unity (GNU) on 30 September 2025. He further stated that he would resign as Minister of Sport, Arts, and Culture on the same day. McKenzie had given Johannesburg Mayor Dada Morero an ultimatum to reinstate PA Deputy President Kenny Kunene to his former Mayco member for transport role, or have the PA withdraw from the city's coalition government. Morero did not do so. In McKenzie's statement, he confirmed that the PA would withdraw from coalitions at all levels of government. If followed through on, the PA would be the first party to exit the GNU.
- 1 October: After a meeting with the ANC, the PA announced that the two parties had found common ground, and that the PA would not leave the governing coalition.
- 1 October: Leader of the Marxist Economic Freedom Fighters (EFF) party and Member of Parliament, Julius Malema, was convicted of five offenses, including the illegal possession of a firearm and ammunition, illegally firing a weapon in public, and reckless endangerment. These offenses related to an EFF rally, at which Malema fired between 14 and 15 live rounds on a stage, in front of 20,000 EFF supporters. Known for his belligerence, Malema will undergo pre-sentencing in January 2026, where, under South African law, he faces a minimum prison sentence of 15 years. Furthermore, as per the Constitution of South Africa, should he receive a sentence of 12 months or more, without the option of a fine, and fails to have the judgement overturned on appeal, Malema will be barred from serving as a Member of Parliament for five years.
- 4 October: ActionSA announced that Xolani Khumalo was their mayoral candidate for Ekurhuleni.
- 5 October: The leaders of three minor political parties, Mmusi Maimane, Songezo Zibi and Patricia de Lille ( BOSA, Rise Mzansi and Good respectively), announced the formation of a new political party (Unite for Change). While the party will contest the municipal elections under one banner, the parties' previously elected officials will continue to sit as members of the party they were elected as.
- 12 October: It was reported that the ANC was considering breaking tradition and announcing its Johannesburg mayoral candidate. Historically, the party has not done this; however, DA candidate Helen Zille's high-profile candidacy may force the ANC to announce someone in an attempt to retain control of the metro.
- 21 October: COSATU, SA's largest trade union, said it had yet to decide which of its former tripartite alliance partners to back in the 2026 local elections. This is the first election where the SACP and ANC are running against one another, and COSATU is expected to back one of the parties.
- 24 October: Just three months after its formation, the Afrika Mayibuye Movement (AMM) removed the party's first Deputy President, Nolubabalo Mcinga, due to misconduct. Mcinga had recently been involved in a fallout with party leader Floyd Shivambu. She also had an unsanctioned meeting on behalf of the party with a PR firm, and an unsanctioned meeting with MK leader Jacob Zuma.
- 3 November: South African President Cyril Ramaphosa reconfirmed that the Government of National Unity (GNU) would remain. He further said that the 16-month-old coalition government was intent on finding more ways to work together and focusing on how best to improve the lives of South Africans. The announcement followed a retreat (strategic session) with GNU party leaders, with no agenda and a mandate to keep matters private, so that leaders could speak freely with each other about how best to work together in the continued GNU. President Ramaphosa said the retreat went "exceptionally well", that leaders had celebrated the GNU's progress and transformational work, and that further such meetings would happen. Other GNU party leaders also stated that the retreat was a success.
- 4 November: The Electoral Commission confirmed that 508 political parties had registered to contest the 2026 local elections. The total included 62 new parties since the last municipal election. Of the 508 parties, 295 were registered at the national level, while 404 were registered at the provincial level.
- 5 December: The Electoral Commission of South Africa announced that it would launch a new podcast platform and updated WhatsApp channel in 2026, as part of an initiative to motivate more young South Africans to participate in the democratic process by voting in elections.

=== 2026 ===
- 19 January: It was reported that the ANC considered South African billionaire and founder of mining company African Rainbow Minerals Patrice Motsepe as a high quality candidate to run for its party leadership, and succeed then-present leader Cyril Ramaphosa. Motsepe, who serves on the Board of the World Economic Forum and as the President of the Confederation of African Football, had not yet confirmed an interest in running for the ANC position.
- 20 January: Leader of the Patriotic Alliance and Minister of Sport, Arts and Culture Gayton McKenzie sparked outrage over his actions resulting in South Africa withdrawing from the 61st Venice Biennale, a contemporary art exhibition with an international following. McKenzie overruled an independent curatorial panel's unanimous selection of a work by artist Gabrielle Goliath. Goliath's long-running performance work Energy addresses themes such as gender-based violence, and the War in Gaza. Thus, McKenzie's decision raised questions as to whether his actions were motivated by censorship and political interference.
- 21 January: Helen Zille confirmed that she would not stand for another term as the Chairperson of the Federal Council of the Democratic Alliance. Zille said she intends to focus on her campaign to become Joburg's next Mayor, stating that she feels her job is now to try and help fix local government, with functional metros benefitting South Africa as a whole.
- 22 January: South African artist Gabrielle Goliath decided to sue PA Leader and Minister of Sport, Arts and Culture Gayton McKenzie, over his decision to withdraw her exhibit from the 61st Venice Biennale event. Goliath's lawyers asked the Gauteng Division of the High Court in Pretoria to declare that McKenzie's attempts to interfere with and obstruct the independent selection committee's decision to select her work were unconstitutional, unlawful, and invalid. They further asked the court to set aside McKenzie's decision to withdraw her artwork from the event, and bar him from taking any further steps to interfere with or obstruct her exhibit from being shown at the 61st Venice Biennale.
- 4 February: Democratic Alliance Leader and Minister of Agriculture John Steenhuisen announced that he would be stepping down from his role leading the DA, to focus exclusively on managing his portfolio at the Department of Agriculture, Forestry and Fisheries. Steenhuisen remarked that he did not want his being at the forefront of the 2026 South African municipal elections to detract from his ministerial role, and so they were best done by two separate individuals. During his announcement, Steenhuisen celebrated major DA successes, including being a major part of the formation of the GNU, and the party entering ruling national government for the first time. Steenhuisen's decision was widely viewed as opening the door for highly popular Cape Town Mayor Geordin Hill-Lewis to run for the position of DA Leader. Hill-Lewis founded the DA Student Organization (DASO) while attending UCT, and served as Helen Zille's Chief of Staff, before becoming Mayor of Cape Town in 2021. Cape Town has, for numerous years, been widely regarded as South Africa's best-run metro, with clean audits, good governance, the highest number of affordable housing units developed, and sustainable infrastructure development among the City of Cape Town's successes.
- 7 February: Calls for the removal of Patriotic Alliance Leader and Minister of Sport, Arts and Culture Gayton McKenzie grew, with various sports organizations, cultural groups, indigenous groups, and activists raising concerns about his controversial statements and decisions. Around the same time, McKenzie's latest controversial comments surrounded his public affirmation of his support for US President Donald Trump's stance on immigration, and forced removal actions through Federal Agency ICE. Analysts said the controversies collectively raised questions about McKenzie's ability to lead a department responsible for social cohesion, cultural diversity, heritage protection, arts, and sport development. At the time, Khayelitsha community activist Thulani Dasa commented that, "development is delivered through honest, capable, and accountable government".
- 16 February: Leader of ActionSA Herman Mashaba announced that he would compete for his party's nomination to run for Mayor of Johannesburg.
- 20 February: Democratic Alliance Federal Executive Leader Helen Zille campaigned in Johannesburg's Ward 102, for Bea Campbell-Cloete, who was hoping to become the ward's new councilor. Ward 102 comprises the suburbs of Bryanston, Hurlingham, Blairgowrie, Bordeaux, and Randburg CBD. Should Campbell-Cloete become the ward's next councilor, her proportional representation (PR) councilor seat would become vacant. This would allow Zille to fill that seat, and join the Johannesburg City Council, which Zille plans to do, should the opportunity arise. Despite Ward 102 traditionally being a DA stronghold, the party said it was leaving nothing to chance, and was campaigning heavily regardless.
- 21 February: ActionSA announced that its leader, Herman Mashaba would be its candidate for Mayor of Johannesburg, after emerging as the preferred candidate from a shortlist of five.
- 23 February: The Msunduzi Local Municipality announced during a media briefing that municipal employees affiliated with the uMkhonto weSizwe Party (MKP) had been linked to alleged sabotage of the municipality's water infrastructure. It was noted that the water supply to government institutions had been interfered with, and resulted in a water outage. The municipality said the interference was politically-motivated, and confirmed it had launched an investigation into the matter.
- 26 February: A former ActionSA Johannesburg PR councilor left the party to join the Democratic Alliance. Mandla Nyaqela accused ActionSA Leader Herman Mashaba of being a dictator, saying no choice or autonomy was given to the party members, and that everyone had to vote according to what Mashaba wanted. He cited an example of an upcoming Johannesburg council meeting to elect a Deputy Mayor, where he said all ActionSA councilors were told to vote according to Mashaba's decision, and he further claimed the party was a cult. Around 50 other ActionSA members left the party and joined the DA at the same time. The members were mostly from Soweto, and were formerly at five ActionSA branches, including Dobsonville, Zondi, Jabulani, Braamfischerville, and Mofolo. DA FedEx Chair and Joburg mayoral candidate Helen Zille welcomed the new party members at a meeting in Dobsonville, Soweto on 26 February 2026, where she stated that several more ActionSA members were expected to join the DA.
- 27 February: Cape Town Mayor Geordin Hill-Lewis announced he would run for the position of Leader of the Democratic Alliance. Launching his campaign in Elsie's River, he said that he has a deep love for South Africa, and wants to make the country work. His candidacy for the role was nominated by fellow DA member and Minister of Basic Education Siviwe Gwarube, who said she did so with conviction, and believes in a new generation of leaders. At the announcement, senior party members highlighted the DA's significant continued successes with governance and service delivery in Cape Town.
- 27 February: The Democratic Alliance's (DA) Gauteng Legislature Leader Solly Msimanga confirmed he had accepted a nomination to run for the position of DA Federal Chairperson. At his announcement in Pretoria, Msimanga, who has led the party in the Gauteng Legislature since 2023, said he was humbled by the nomination, stating he was accepting it not for title or prestige, but for purpose. He committed to working to increase the number of DA Mayors outside the Western Cape.
- 28 February: It was reported that South Africans had given the Democratic Alliance the majority of the political donations declared for the period September to December 2025. Of the total campaign funding given to the five political parties that declared donations for that period, South African donors gave over 89% to the DA.
- 1 March: The Democratic Alliance stated that, based on past voter turnout data, if 490,000 registered DA voters turn up in Johannesburg in the municipal elections and vote for the DA on both ballots, the party would secure an outright majority in the Joburg Metropolitan Municipality.
- 3 March: More announcements were made in terms of those running for top positions in the DA's Federal Executive. The party's National Assembly House Chair Werner Horn and Deputy Finance Minister Ashor Sarupen launched campaigns for the role of Federal Council Chair.
- 9 March: The Electoral Commission commenced with a nationwide push for online voter registration. The Commission encouraged all eligible citizens to use its IEC self-service portal to register, update their details, and check their voter status online, ahead of election day. Furthermore, the Commission also started increasing its registration drives and civic education efforts at schools and universities.
- 24 March: Sedibeng District Municipality Councilor and Democratic Alliance member Sibusiso Dyonase announced his candidacy for the position of Leader of the DA, setting him up to run against Geordin Hill-Lewis. The two would therefore be seeking the support of party delegates in the run-up to the DA's Federal Congress in April.
- 1 April: It was reported that the Electoral Commission of South Africa (IEC) was in the process of recruiting and training over 70,000 employees to assist with the registration weekend taking place on 20 and 21 June 2026. The IEC unveiled its election logo and tagline, "Get Up, Show Up, Vote", at the Gallagher Convention Centre. IEC Chairperson Mosotho Moepya said both were designed to attract the youth vote.
- 3 April: news24 reported on how DA candidate for Joburg Mayor, Helen Zille was running a new kind of campaign - one that uses humor and social media to address serious infrastructure issues. Zille said she was running a digital-first campaign that was an adaptation to how the consumption of news and media in general had evolved due to technology. She praised her young campaign team for being innovative, and being up for anything, making the campaign content fun. news24 also noted how the ANC-run City of Johannesburg was attending to infrastructure issues right after Zille's campaign released content about them. This, despite those same issues having already been reported by residents through official channels.
- 12 April: The Democratic Alliance (DA) elected Cape Town Mayor Geordin Hill-Lewis as the party's new leader at its 2026 Federal Congress. Hill-Lewis garnered more delegate votes than runner-up Councilor Sibusiso Dyonase. In his acceptance speech, Hill-Lewis said the upcoming local election would serve as a stepping stone towards building the DA into the largest party in South Africa, ahead of the 2029 national election.
- 16 April: Leader of the Economic Freedom Fighters (EFF) Julius Malema was sentenced to five years in prison, after he was found guilty of charges relating to the illegal possession of a firearm and ammunition, public discharging of a firearm, and reckless endangerment. The acts were committed by Malema at a rally. It was found that these acts were planned by Malema before the event. Malema was also declared unfit to possess a firearm. Sentencing took place at the East London Magistrate's Court.
- 24 April: Democratic Alliance (South Africa) (DA) mayoral candidate for Johannesburg, Helen Zille, said that her campaign was focused on municipal issues rather than international affairs. Addressing criticism of her position on the Israel–Gaza war as protests continue to take place across the country, she stated: "I'm fighting to be mayor of Joburg, not Ramallah, or Bethlehem, or Tehran, or Gaza City, or Tel Aviv. I'm focusing on fixing Joburg."
- 30 April: President Cyril Ramaphosa announced the date of the election to be 4 November 2026. The day is likely to be declared a public holiday, as per precedent.
- 5 May: MP and leader of the National Coloured Congress Fadiel Adams was arrested by the Political Killings Task Team (PKTT), a unit of the South African Police Service. Adams was arrested on charges of fraud and defeating or obstructing the course of justice. Police stated that the task team discovered that Mr Adams interfered with police investigations during an advanced stage of the case. Adams was also accused of misusing his parliamentary status to gain access to a prison to interview an inmate, and convincing prison authorities to allow him to enter with his cellphone, which should not have been permitted.
- 6 May: Media reports were published relating to a letter that Finance Minister Enoch Godongwana had written to Johannesburg Mayor Dada Morero the month before, in relation to the City's finances. The letter stated that the City of Johannesburg metro owed creditors R25.2 billion, while only holding R3.9 billion in cash, essentially declaring Joburg as bankrupt. The letter also said the City had violated multiple provisions of the Municipal Finance Management Act. Godongwana threatened to withhold R8 billion in equitable share revenue if the City didn't fix its financial practices.
- 8 May: The Constitutional Court ruled that the then-ANC-controlled Parliament's 2022 vote not to refer the report of the Phala Phala case to an independent panel, as envisaged by National Assembly rules, was unconstitutional. It was thus set aside. Furthermore, the court ordered Parliament to assemble a panel to review, as a result of the case, whether or not President Cyril Ramaphosa should be impeached.
- 20 May: Human Rights Watch noted the wave of xenophobic violence which swept cities like Durban, Pretoria and Johannesburg, spearheaded by groups such as March and March. March and March's leader Jacinta Ngobese-Zuma has denied allegations of xenophobia, instead reiterating that the organisations goal is to pressure the government to enforce stricter immigration laws.
- 28 May: The Democratic Alliance gained a 100% demographically Black South African township ward from the ANC in a by-election for the first time in the country's history of democracy, in Evaton, Emfuleni
- 7 June: Western Cape MPP and GOOD Secretary-General Brett Herron was announced to be the Cape Town mayoral candidate for both GOOD and Rise Mzansi.
- 18 June: Speaker of the National Assembly Thoko Didiza referred contempt of Parliament charges against EFF leader Julius Malema to the Powers and Privileges Committee. This was as a result of Malema's continued refusal to apologize for using his platform to question a judge who ruled against the EFF in 2019. Malema was ordered to apologize after Parliament adopted a recommendation from the Ethics Committee for him to do so, back in 2021.
- 20 June: The Electoral Commission hosted a voter registration weekend, opening voting stations across South Africa to give eligible citizens a convenient opportunity to register, update their details, or check that they appear on the voters' roll, in advance of the November elections. The Commission also confirmed that South Africans could register or update their details online through its Voter Information Portal.
- 22 June: The Electoral Commission announced the results of its successful voter registration weekend. It said around 90% of registrations took place at physical polling stations, and that young South Africans and new voters comprised the majority of registrations. The Commission said that it had recorded a total of 2.9 million registrations over the weekend -an improvement over the 1.7 million registrants during the registration weekend during the 2021 local elections. Furthermore, 477,174 (16%) of registrants were new voters. The total number of registered South African voters after the weekend was 28.5 million. The Commission confirmed that a second voter registration weekend would take place, from 1 through 2 August 2026.
- 24 June: ANC Minister of Finance Enoch Godongwana notified ANC Johannesburg Mayor Dada Morero of plans to stop transfer of funds from the national government to Joburg, effective Friday 26 June 2026, unless a satisfactory explanation of why this should not occur was received by the Treasury before then. This followed Godongwana writing to Morero in April 2026, notifying him of violations to the Municipal Finance Management Act, and threatening to cut off funding transfers (R8 billion in equitable share revenue). The City of Johannesburg proceeded with a budget against the Treasury's wishes, and did not submit sufficient explanations for its financial practices, according to Godongwana. As such, the Minister stated his intent to proceed with the ending of transfers, through invoking Section 216(2) of the Constitution. The Democratic Alliance threatened legal action against the Minister of Finance unless he intervened to attempt to resolve the financial situation in Johannesburg.
- 30 June: President Cyril Ramaphosa announced Cabinet changes. Former ANC Minister Dina Pule was appointed to fill the Minister of Social Development position left vacant through the dismissal of Sisisi Tolashe. Numerous changes were made at the request of the Democratic Alliance, as a formal member of the GNU. Former party leader John Steenhuisen was moved into the position of Deputy Minister of Trade, Industry and Competition. Replacing him as Minister of Agriculture is Willie Aucamp. Replacing Aucamp in his former role as Minister of Forestry, Fisheries and the Environment is David Maynier, who previously served as Western Cape Provincial Minister of Education. Other DA appointments were Alexandra Abrahams as Deputy Minister of Electricity and Energy, Jack Bloom as Deputy Minister of Water and Sanitation, and Yusuf Cassim as Deputy Minister of Higher Education.
- 3 July: Severe multi week water shortages in Ratanda, Lesedi local municipality, prompt intense service delivery protests. Demonstrators barricade major routes, halting economic activity. Escalating violence led to the burning of the mayor's house and looting of nearby business. Clashes between law enforcement and residents lead to the police firing rubber bullets.
- 7 July: The Madlanga Commission found that EFF Leader Julius Malema was linked to tobacco businessman Mo Sayed and tainted Crime Intelligence cop Feroz Khan. It was discovered that Sayed frequently acted as a middleman between Khan and Malema, and that Khan drafted questions for the EFF to put to Inspector-General of Intelligence during a parliamentary appearance. The Madlanga Commission Evidence Leader stated that these interactions had the appearance of, "an illegal favour in return for a favour". Khan also sent questions to the EFF to raise with then-Minister of Police Bheki Cele.
- 8 July: As he warned he would, Finance Minister Enoch Godongwana withheld national financial transfers to the City of Johannesburg due to the City's financial mismanagement. Withholding the transfers is intended to bring about fiscal discipline, prevent wasteful expenditure, and hold Joburg's City officials accountable. Funds would only be reinstated once the City conveys how it plans to fix its financial situation. Joburg Mayor Dada Morero said the City would fully comply with the process.
- 10 July: The uMkhonto weSizwe Party (MKP) was reported to be in poor financial condition, following irresponsible expenditure and undesirable fundraising performance. As such, the party froze travel allowances for its leaders. This followed the firing of the party's Treasurer-General in January 2026.
- 25 July: The Economic Freedom Fighters released its election manifesto and announced its mayoral candidates for the municipal elections during the party's 13th birthday celebration rally at the Thohoyandou Stadium, in Thohoyandou. The party selected United Nations Special Rapporteur on the Right to Health Dr Tlaleng Mofokeng as its mayoral candidate for the City of Johannesburg. It also named EFF National Chairperson Nontando Nolutshungu for the City of Cape Town, Omphile Maotwe for the City of Tshwane, Hlengiwe Mkhaliphi for eThekwini, former Council Speaker Nthabiseng Tshivenga for the City of Ekurhuleni, Sam Matiase for Mangaung, Sinawo Thambo for Nelson Mandela Bay, and Mkhululi Dlevu for Buffalo City. The party further announced candidates for several "strategic" municipalities, including Lawrence Mapoulo for Polokwane, party Deputy President Godrich Gardee for Mbombela, Israel Monaise for Rustenburg, and Florence Tito for Sol Plaatje.
- 29 July 2026: SA's Electoral Commission (ECSA) announced that the total number of registered political parties in the runup to the local elections had reached 620. This represented an increase of over 100 parties since March that same year. The Commission also stated that 76 parties and 39 independent candidates had started using its Online Candidate Nomination System (ONCS). The ECSA also confirmed that, based on demand, it had settled on a total of 23,699 voting stations for the 2026 elections. Finally, the Commission confirmed that its second and final voter registration weekend would be held over 1 and 2 August 2026.
- 1 August 2026: The Electoral Commission of South Africa (ECSA) announced that, during the first day of its second registration weekend, it had recorded a further 30,000 new voter registrations.
- 3 August 2026: The ECSA confirmed that over the two days of its final voter registration weekend, a total of 299,000 new voter registrations were recorded. Therefore, the total new voter registrations across the two registration weekends was 754,000. The Commission confirmed that total registered voters were at around 29 million, and that registration online would close on 7 August 2026.
- 4 August 2026: After seizing control of party finances, Jacob Zuma fired John Hlophe as uMkhonto weSizwe Party's (MKP) First Deputy President, and appointed his own son, Duduzane Zuma, in the role instead. Furthermore, Jacob Zuma removed longtime ally Nathi Nhleko from the role of National Chair of the party, replacing him with Mxolisi Phakathi.
- 5 August 2026: MP and leader of the National Coloured Congress Fadiel Adams was suspended from Parliament after the Joint Committee on Ethics and Members' Interests found that he had contravened Parliament's code of ethical conduct. Adams published a Facebook post that included the personal details of a DA MP.
- 8 August 2026: The Democratic Alliance (DA) officially launched its manifesto for the local elections. The National Manifesto Launch for Election 2026 was held in Joburg, with its keynote speech delivered by party leader Geordin Hill-Lewis. Prior to this, the manifesto underwent workshopping across the DA's members, and received approval by the DA's Federal Council the week before the launch event. At the launch, the DA used National Treasury data, municipal audit stats, and infrastructure metrics to delve into how, in technical terms, it would commit to improving service delivery. The technical blueprint focused on ringfencing utility revenue to invest in infrastructure development, ending the cadre deployment that other parties had relied on, and appointing staff based on merit, including finance experts, planners, and engineers.
- 11 August 2026: Suspended MP and leader of the National Coloured Congress Fadiel Adams appeared before the Madlanga Commission, and blamed a faulty laptop for his not responding to the Commission's formal notice emails, dating back to October 2025. The Commission's Chair, Mbuyiseli Madlanga, asked Adams how he could function properly as a Member of Parliament while having a faulty laptop. Adams responded, "Half the time, I don't". Madlanga said that Adams was not taking the Commission seriously. Adams' evidence was postponed until 19 August, while the Commission continued with other work.
- 19 August 2026: At his second Madlanga Commission appearance, suspended MP and leader of the National Coloured Congress Fadiel Adams admitted he had lied to the Commission about receiving its emails. Adams had originally claimed that he had sent a faulty laptop to Parliament's IT department numerous times, and blamed this for not receiving the Commission's email about questions he was to answer. However, Parliament refuted this, and stated it was unaware that Adams' official device was not operational. At his second Commission appearance, Adams said he had actually received the email, but had then forgotten about it. When questioned by the Commission about his social media posts, Adams stated, "Forget what I say on social media; that's me acting like a fool half the time".
- 23 August 2026: The African National Congress (ANC) failed to deliver on its commitment to announce its final mayoral candidates for South Africa's municipalities, ahead of the 2026 elections. At an event in Sandton, the party instead announced what it called a "shortlist" of many more candidates, and around two months prior to the elections, has therefore still not revealed who will run for SA's mayorships under the ANC banner. This, while other parties like the Democratic Alliance (DA), have had dedicated candidates for some metros who have been campaigning for over a year. Anonymous ANC party insiders told members of the media that the reason the announcement went differently was that the ANC's leadership was factionalized, with different priorities, and therefore could not agree on who to nominate.
- 25 August 2026: Former Tshwane FF+ Caucus Leader Grandi Theunissen joined the Democratic Alliance, after 32 years with the Freedom Front Plus. Theunissen had served as a MayCo member under the DA's Cilliers Brink when the latter served as Mayor of Tshwane, a metro of which the city of Pretoria is a part. Brink is campaigning to regain that position in the 2026 elections. Theunissen said he had witnessed the FF+ trying to vote out numerous DA mayors in the Western Cape, and said he did not support that kind of politicking, and would not allow it to jeopardize a Tshwane coalition.
- 27 August 2026: The Electoral Commission reminded independent candidates and political parties that the 28th of August 2026 was the filing deadline for candidate nominations across all municipalities. The IEC encouraged candidates and parties to ensure that their nominations were submitted well ahead of the deadline, so as to enable a seamless transition to the post-nomination processes. The Commission further stated that the Online Candidate Nomination System (OCNS) and IEC offices would not be available for submissions beyond the deadline, and that the deadline was based on the election timetable, which could not be changed or negotiated.
- 28 August 2026: After 5PM, the Electoral Commission confirmed that the deadline for candidate nominations had been reached, and that no corrections, amendments, or deadline extensions would be allowed.
- 28 August 2026: First quarter political party donations were reported to total R116 million. Potentially an indicator of support for the upcoming elections, R104 million (roughly 90%) was donated to the Democratic Alliance (DA). Meanwhile, the ANC was facing compliance issues over the donations it received.
- 31 August 2026: It was reported that the African National Congress (ANC) had missed the filing deadline for registering its candidates in six municipalities. The party blamed this on "technical problems" with the IEC's system, but the IEC refuted this, stating that there were no issues with the submission system, and that other parties had managed to file successfully. The ANC's statements were in contrast to those made a day before, when the party's Secretary General Fikile Mbalula said that the ANC had met the filing deadline without any issues.
- 1 September 2026: The Electoral Commission released an official statement confirming that it would not grant extensions to the candidate filing process. The Commission defended the integrity of its infrastructure, stating that Online Candidate Nomination System (OCNS) remained fully operational and available to users throughout the entire nomination period, including up to the exact cutoff time on Friday the 28th of August. It further stated that to ensure candidates had ample time to navigate the system without interruption, the OCNS was opened early on 21 June 2026, long before the official nomination period formally commenced on proclamation day, which took place on 7 August.
- 3 September 2026: Thembinkosi Mjuza, a former ANC councilor in Gugulethu, Cape Town's Ward 39, left the ANC to join the Democratic Alliance (DA). It was announced he would be running under the DA banner for the 2026 elections in the same ward he served in before. Mjuza said he became frustrated with the ANC's focus on party factionalism, rather than on service delivery. He realized that he shared the same principles as the DA, and thus decided to join the party.
- 7 September 2026: The ANC filed court papers with the Electoral Court, challenging the IEC's candidate submission deadline, and seeking to appeal the exclusion of members who missed the 28 August cutoff. The party continued to cite system errors as the reason that some of its nominations had not been submitted, and claimed that it had uploaded all documents on time. The IEC maintained that this was incorrect, and that its system was fully operational throughout the entire filing period.
- 11 September 2026: In papers filed with the Electoral Court, the Electoral Commission explained the process for submitting candidate lists for each municipality, and the process for submitting for both wards and proportional representation. Chief Electoral Officer Sy Mamabolo said that the task could not be left to the last minute. In supporting documentation, the IEC showed that the ANC was uploading information right up until five minutes before the submission deadline, and that the Commission's servers were fully operational throughout the submission window. The Commission's papers showed that half an hour before the submission deadline, no action was taken by the ANC on the filing system for any of the six municipalities that the party was disputing. Furthermore, the IEC said that the ANC had failed to submit any evidence of technical issues.
- 15 September 2026: As per tradition, President Cyril Ramaphosa declared voting day for the 2026 elections to be a public holiday. He encouraged all registered voters to use the opportunity to exercise their democratic right and civic duty by voting in the election, reminding voters that it was a way to influence service delivery in their communities.
- 16 September 2026: The Electoral Court dismissed the ANC's appeal to have 181 councilor candidates included on the ballot after the party missed the candidate submission deadline. The ruling meant that those candidates would not contest the 2026 elections, and that the ANC would therefore not be running any candidates in those wards. The ANC said it would appeal the ruling. The Democratic Alliance (DA) welcomed the Electoral Court's decision. In an official statement, the DA said that, given that all parties were expected to meet the same filing deadline, the court's ruling was fair. The party also confirmed that it had managed to submit candidate nominations for all wards included in the 2026 elections.
- 15 October 2026: The Constitutional Court accepted the ANC's appeal to have its previously excluded 181 councilor candidates reinstated on the ballot after the party made its appeal to the apex court.
- 31 October 2026: In a show of the expansion of the DA's ambitions, party leader Geordin Hill-Lewis said that while smaller parties in SA may secure seats during the elections, only his party had the organizational capacity to govern effectively and displace the ANC from power. The DA predicted it would shift from being in government in 27 councils to approximately 60, after the 2026 elections. Hill-Lewis also said the DA was on track to lead the country at the national level in 2029, after the next general election.
- 4 November 2026: The 2026 municipal elections took place across South Africa.

== Opinion polls ==
=== National respondents ===
The below polls were conducted nationally.

Polling Organisation	Fieldwork Date	Sample Size	ANC	DA	MK	EFF	IFP	FF+	ASA	PA	Others	Don't Know (Note: Includes abstention and no answer responses)	Lead
Ipsos	September – October 2026	2,533	30%	28%	12%	10%	4%	—N/a	4%	2%	7%	3%	2
Social Research Foundation/The Common Sense	September – October 2026	3,100	32%	26%	12%	8%	—N/a	—N/a	—N/a	—N/a	—N/a	—N/a	6
SABI Strategy Group/News24	August – September 2026	1,000	31.6%	25.2%	14.7%	12.2%	3.5%	3.2%	2.9%	2.4%	4.0%	—N/a	6.4
Social Research Foundation/The Common Sense	July 2026	2,144	34%	27%	15%	7%	5%	3%	—N/a	—N/a	—N/a	—N/a	7
Ipsos	June – July 2026	3,600 (Note: Ipsos Khayabus "Pulse of the People". 3,600 adults were interviewed, of whom 70% reported being registered with the IEC. Figures reflect voting intention for the November 2026 local government elections among registered voters only. Of these, 81.8% selected a party on the electronic ballot; the remaining 18.2% indicated that they would not vote or gave no answer and are excluded from the base. Ipsos recalculated the party shares to total 100% among those expressing a preference, so the 3% shown under "Don't Know" is measured within that reduced base and is not comparable to the abstention figures elsewhere in this table. Parties polling below 2% nationally, including the FF+, are not reported separately.)	31%	25%	14%	11%	3%	—N/a	6%	2%	5%	3%	6
Social Research Foundation/The Common Sense	March 2026	2,222	39%	28%	10%	6%	5%	4%	3%	3%	—N/a	—N/a	11
Ipsos	December 2025 - January 2026	3,600	38%	22%	13%	13%	2%	1%	4%	3%	4%	—N/a	16
2021 South African municipal elections	—N/a	—N/a	45.59%	21.62%	—N/a	10.32%	5.65%	2.34%	2.34%	—N/a	—N/a	—N/a	24

=== Johannesburg respondents ===
The below polls were conducted specifically for residents of the City of Johannesburg metro, which includes the city of Johannesburg.

Polling Organisation	Fieldwork Date	Sample Size	DA	ANC	MK	ASA	EFF	IFP	FF+	PA	Others	Don't Know (Note: Includes abstention and no answer responses)	Lead
2026 South African municipal elections	—N/a	—N/a	34.79%	20.25%	5.57%	16.27%	6.52%	2.46%	1.83%	2.00%	10.31%	—N/a	14.54
Ipsos	September – October 2026	—N/a	30%	27%	5%	11%	12%	2%	3%	1%	5%	4%	3
Social Research Foundation/The Common Sense	September – October 2026	—N/a	36%	22%	11%	9%	6%	—N/a	—N/a	—N/a	—N/a	—N/a	14
SABI Strategy Group/News24	August – September 2026	1,000	29.2%	22.6%	12.3%	7%	11%	1.9%	3%	3.7%	9.3%	—N/a	6.6
eNCA/MarkData	August – September 2026	1,011	35.0%	21.8%	12.5%	10.3%	11.9%	0.7%	0.9%	3.7%	3.2%	—N/a	13.2
Social Research Foundation/The Common Sense	July 2026	504	42%	18%	13%	10%	8%	—N/a	—N/a	—N/a	—N/a	—N/a	24
Ipsos	June – July 2026	—N/a (Note: Ipsos does not publish metro subsample sizes. Figures are voting intention for the November 2026 local government elections among Johannesburg registered voters who selected a party on an electronic ballot, recalculated to total 100%; a further 17% of the metro's registered voters indicated they would not vote and are excluded from this base, so the 3% shown under "Don't Know" is not comparable to abstention figures elsewhere in this table. Ipsos reports separately only those parties polling at least 2% nationally; the FF+ is therefore not listed and its support is included in "Others", rather than being absent. A dash in the Ipsos source denotes support below 2%, which applies to the IFP.)	28%	31%	6%	14%	8%	—N/a	—N/a	3%	7%	3%	3
Social Research Foundation/The Common Sense	March 2026	500	39%	30%	8%	10%	4%	—	—	—	—	—	9
2021 South African municipal elections	—N/a	—N/a	26.14%	33.6%	—N/a	16.05%	10.63%	2.36%	1.34%	2.93%	6.95%	—N/a	7

The SRF survey was conducted telephonically among registered voters and applied a turnout model of approximately 56%, while Ipsos interviewed respondents face-to-face and asked them to mark an electronic ballot, excluding from its base the 17% of Johannesburg registered voters who said they would not vote.

=== Ekurhuleni respondents ===
The below polls were conducted specifically for residents of the Ekurhuleni metro, which includes the city of Germiston.

Polling Organisation	Fieldwork Date	Sample Size	DA	ANC	MK	ASA	EFF	IFP	FF+	PA	Others	Don't Know	Lead
eNCA/MarkData	August – September 2026	1,019	31.2%	29.4%	11.5%	6.1%	9.2%	2.8%	5.2%	2.5%	2.2%	—N/a	1.8
2021 South African municipal elections	—N/a	—N/a	28.72%	38.19%	—N/a	6.60%	13.57%	1.36%	3.33%	1.88%	6.35%	—N/a	9

The margin of error for Ekurhuleni is 3,07%. The poll was conducted from 10 August to 14 September using both telephone and face-to-face interviews in the preferred language of the respondent.

=== Tshwane respondents ===
The below polls were conducted specifically for residents of the Tshwane metro, which includes the city of Pretoria.

Polling Organisation	Fieldwork Date	Sample Size	DA	ANC	MK	ASA	EFF	IFP	FF+	PA	Others	Don't Know (Note: Includes abstention and no answer responses)	Lead
Ipsos	September – October 2026	—N/a	34%	31%	2%	8%	8%	2%	5%	—N/a	7%	3%	3
Social Research Foundation/The Common Sense	September – October 2026	—N/a	32%	26%	4%	12%	7%	—N/a	7%	—N/a	—N/a	—N/a	6
eNCA/MarkData	August-September 2026	1,046	33.9%	24.9%	5.2%	10.7%	12.3%	—N/a	7.9%	2.1%	2.6% NCC 0.4% ACDP 0.3% Al Jama-ah 0.1% Rise Mzansi 0.1% Other 1.7%	—N/a	9
SABI Strategy Group/News24	August – September 2026	1,001	32.1%	23.9%	5.8%	10.8%	13.7%	—N/a	4.3%	1.1%	4.6%	—N/a	8.2
Social Research Foundation/The Common Sense	July 2026	508	43%	32%	8%	7%	5%	—N/a	8%	—N/a	—N/a	—N/a	11
Ipsos	June – July 2026	—N/a (Note: Ipsos does not publish metro subsample sizes. Figures are voting intention for the November 2026 local government elections among Tshwane registered voters who selected a party on an electronic ballot, recalculated to total 100%; a further 26% of the metro's registered voters indicated they would not vote and are excluded from this base, so the 2% shown under "Don't Know" is not comparable to abstention figures elsewhere in this table. Ipsos reports separately only those parties polling at least 2% nationally; the FF+ is therefore not listed and its support is included in the 18% shown under "Others", rather than being absent. A dash in the Ipsos source denotes support below 2%, which applies to the IFP.)	31%	22%	5%	11%	9%	—N/a	—N/a	2%	18%	2%	9
Social Research Foundation/The Common Sense	March 2026	500	45%	42%	—	—	—	—	3%	—	—	—	3
2021 South African municipal elections	—N/a	—N/a	32.03%	34.63%	—N/a	8.64%	10.69%	0.15%	7.84%	0.5%	5.52%	—N/a	3

Both polls place the DA ahead in Tshwane, though by differing margins. The SRF survey was conducted telephonically among registered voters and applied a turnout model of approximately 56%, while Ipsos interviewed respondents face-to-face and asked them to mark an electronic ballot, excluding from its base the 26% of Tshwane registered voters who said they would not vote.

=== eThekwini respondents ===
The below polls were conducted specifically for residents of the eThekwini metro, which includes the city of Durban.

Polling Organisation	Fieldwork Date	Sample Size	DA	ANC	MK	ASA	EFF	IFP	FF+	PA	Others	Don't Know (Note: Includes abstention and no answer responses)	Lead
Ipsos	September – October 2026	—N/a	21%	10%	47%	2%	4%	8%	1%	—N/a	5%	—N/a	26
Social Research Foundation/The Common Sense	September – October 2026	—N/a	28%	13%	43%	—N/a	3%	7%	—N/a	—N/a	—N/a	—N/a	15
SABI Strategy Group/News24	August – September 2026	1,000	30.2%	11.3%	43.4%	2.1%	3.1%	6.4%	1.4%	—N/a	2.1%	—N/a	13.2
eNCA/MarkData	August-September 2026	1,046	25.2%	14.5%	48.0%	0.5%	2.5%	6.0%	0.2%	0.5%	2.4% NCC 0.7% ACDP 0.3% Al Jama-ah 0.0% Rise Mzansi 0.1% Other 1.7%	—N/a	22.8
Social Research Foundation/The Common Sense	July 2026	500	23%	18%	33%	—N/a	4%	16%	3%	—N/a	2%	—N/a	10
Ipsos	June – July 2026	—N/a (Note: Ipsos does not publish metro subsample sizes. Figures are voting intention for the November 2026 local government elections among eThekwini registered voters who selected a party on an electronic ballot, recalculated to total 100%; a further 24% of the metro's registered voters indicated they would not vote and are excluded from this base. Ipsos reports separately only those parties polling at least 2% nationally; the FF+ is therefore not listed and its support is included in "Others", rather than being absent. A dash in the Ipsos source denotes support below 2%, which applies to the PA and to the "don't know" response.)	17%	10%	55%	4%	3%	6%	—N/a	—N/a	5%	—N/a	38
Social Research Foundation/The Common Sense	March 2026	500	28%	8%	44%	—	—	18%	—	—	—	—	16
2021 South African municipal elections	—N/a	—N/a	25.62%	42.02%	—N/a	1.93%	10.48%	7.13%	0.26%	0.16%	12.4%	—N/a	16

The SRF/The Common Sense and Ipsos polls produced markedly different pictures of the eThekwini race. The SRF survey was conducted telephonically among registered voters and applied a turnout model of approximately 56%, while Ipsos interviewed respondents face-to-face and asked them to mark an electronic ballot, excluding from its base the 24% of eThekwini registered voters who said they would not vote.

=== Cape Town respondents ===
The below polls were conducted specifically for residents of the City of Cape Town metro, which includes the city of Cape Town.

Polling Organisation	Fieldwork Date	Sample Size	DA	ANC	MK	ASA	EFF	IFP	FF+	PA	Others	Don't Know (Note: Includes abstention and no answer responses)	Lead
Ipsos	September – October 2026	—N/a	51%	21%	3%	3%	10%	—N/a	1%	4%	7%	—N/a	30
News24/SABI Strategy Group	August – September 2026	1,000	56.1%	19.1%	1.1%	2.4%	6.6%	—N/a	2.2%	5.3%	6%	—N/a	37
eNCA/MarkData	August – September 2026	1,004	52.6%	23.6%	1.5%	1.5%	6.5%	0.3%	1.0%	4.9%	8.2%	—N/a	29
Ipsos	June – July 2026	—N/a (Note: Ipsos does not publish the Cape Town subsample size; the metro carries a maximum margin of error of 6.12 percentage points. Figures are voting intention for the November 2026 local government elections among Cape Town registered voters who selected a party on an electronic ballot, recalculated to total 100%; a further 15% of the metro's registered voters indicated they would not vote and are excluded from this base. Ipsos reports separately only those parties polling at least 2% nationally; the FF+ is therefore not listed and its support is included in "Others", rather than being absent. A dash in the Ipsos source denotes support below 2%, which applies to the MK Party, ActionSA, and the IFP.)	46%	26%	—N/a	—N/a	11%	—N/a	—N/a	8%	7%	2%	20
2021 South African municipal elections	—N/a	—N/a	58.27%	18.62%	—N/a	4.47%	3.85%	0.24%	0.94%	6.22%	7.39%	—N/a	40

Ipsos interviewed respondents face-to-face and asked them to mark an electronic ballot, excluding from its base the 15% of Cape Town registered voters who said they would not vote. The DA disputed the findings, with spokesperson Matthew Sims criticising the survey for applying no turnout modelling.

=== Nelson Mandela Bay respondents ===
The below polls were conducted specifically for residents of the Nelson Mandela Bay metro, which includes the city of Gqeberha.

Polling Organisation	Fieldwork Date	Sample Size	DA	ANC	MK	ASA	EFF	IFP	FF+	PA	Others	Don't Know	Lead
eNCA/MarkData	August – September 2026	994	37.7%	37.4%	3.2%	3.4%	8.0%	0.7%	2.3%	4.0%	3.2%	—N/a	0.3
2021 South African municipal elections	—N/a	—N/a	39.92%	39.43%	—N/a	—	6.40%	—	1.57%	1.37%	11.31%	—N/a	0.5

The margin of error for Nelson Mandela Bay is 3,11%. The poll was conducted from 10 August to 14 September using both telephone and face-to-face interviews in the preferred language of the respondent.

== Voting day ==
Voting station signage in Bergvliet, Cape Town, for the 2026 municipal elections

Voting took place on 4 November 2026. A total of approximately 29 million South Africans were eligible to participate, based on final voter registrations. Voters went with their IDs to the polling station where they were registered, signed in with an Electoral Commission representative, cast two ballots in private based on the local government election system, and had their thumbs inked with a special dye to signify that they voted. Once the polls were declared closed, vote counting commenced, with results continuously being updated on the IEC Results Dashboard.

== Outcome ==
=== Post-voting process ===
Polls closed at 9PM on 4 November 2026. Subsequently, ballot papers started being counted at voting stations, in the presence of party agents, independent agents, and accredited observers. The Electoral Commission's results operation centres provide political parties, independent candidates, and the media with an opportunity to monitor the capturing, verification, and processing of results.

After counting, result slips will be completed in duplicate, signed by the Presiding Officer, and countersigned by party agents, before being displayed at their respective voting stations.

Once counting has been completed, officials will reconcile the results of each contest against the ballot papers received, issued, and those that remain unused at each polling station. Before the Commission can declare the election results, they are scanned and captured at the local office of the Commission, and subjected to verification and independent external auditing.

Results are announced as they are finalized, starting the day after the elections. Final results are usually announced by the Electoral Commission within a few days following voting day.

=== Initial results reporting ===
At around 8.30AM on 5 November – the day after the elections, with 20% of polling reported, the Democratic Alliance and African National Congress were almost tied for percentage of votes cast nationally, indicating a potential significant shift in SA politics at the local government level. At the time of reporting, the DA was at 30.54%, only just behind the ANC at 31.4%.

=== Vote counting ===
Following the closure of voting stations at 9PM on 4 November 2026, the Electoral Commission began counting, capturing, and verifying election results. By the 7.30AM on 5 November, approximately 18% of voting districts had been completed. At 9AM that same day, the Commission reported that 22,983 of the 66,073 expected results slips (34.8%) had been captured. This was a separate measure from the percentage of voting districts completed. By 5PM on the 5th, over 60% of results slips had been captured, with 40,202 scanned and 32,238 independently audited.

By around 2PM on 6 November, 82% of voting districts had completed counting. At 5PM, the IEC separately announced a national results completion rate of 91%, with results finalized in 150 of the country's 213 metropolitan and local municipalities. By around 7.30PM on the 6th, approximately 93% of voting districts had been counted.

On 7 November at around 6PM, the IEC reported that overall results processing had reached 98%, with counting completed in six of the nine provinces. By 8PM, it was reported that 99% of voting districts had been declared.

=== National votes ===
In terms of total proportional representation (PR) votes cast nationally, the 2026 elections resulted in some significant changes to South Africa's political landscape. Most notably, the African National Congress (ANC) lost over 15% of the vote share. With just 30.88% of the PR vote – its lowest result in any post-democratic local election, it was only just the largest party by PR vote share.

Factoring in a 3% gain, the Democratic Alliance (DA) shifted closer to tying with the ANC in terms of PR votes, obtaining a 24.75% share.

The uMkhonto weSizwe Party (MKP), which did not exist in the 2021 local elections, secured 9.82% of the PR vote share. Meanwhile, the Economic Freedom Fighters (EFF), which did take part in the 2021 elections, had a 4% decrease in PR vote share, to secure 6.24% in total, making it the fourth-largest party in this regard.

Other parties that experienced proportionally substantial PR vote share losses include the Inkatha Freedom Party (IFP), which decreased by around 1%, to secure 4.69% in total. The African Christian Democratic Party (ACDP) decreased by 0.35% – around half its 2021 PR vote share, to secure 0.45%. The African Independent Congress (AIC) decreased by 0.36% - over half its 2021 vote share, to secure 0.27%. GOOD decreased by 0.39% – over half its 2021 PR vote share, and secured 0.24%.

In contrast, numerous smaller parties had proportionally significant gains in terms of their share of total PR votes. ActionSA more than doubled its 2021 PR vote share, increasing by 3.41% to a total share of 6.02%, making it the fifth-largest party in this regard. The Freedom Front Plus (FF Plus) increased by 0.68%, to secure 3.02%. The Patriotic Alliance (PA) almost doubled its 2021 share, increasing by 0.95% to secure 1.93%.

The African Transformation Movement (ATM) increased its share by 0.43%, to secure 1.04%. The United Democratic Movement (UDM) increased by 0.24% – around half its 2021 PR vote share, to obtain 0.76%. And finally, the Service Delivery Party (SDP), which did not contest the 2021 local elections, obtained 0.43% of the national PR vote share.

=== Major metro council changes ===
Of SA's eight metropolitan municipalities, only one had an overall majority, with the Democratic Alliance (DA) winning the most seats in the City of Cape Town for the fourth consecutive local election.

All seven other metro councils had no overall majority. Of those, the Democratic Alliance was the largest party by number of seats in four of them – the City of Johannesburg, City of Tshwane, Ekurhuleni, and Nelson Mandela Bay.

As for the remaining three councils, the African National Congress (ANC) won the most seats in Buffalo City and Mangaung, and the uMkhonto weSizwe Party (MKP) won the most in eThekwini.

This meant that seven of eight metros (~ 88%) required coalition governments to pass legislation.

On 6 November, DA leader Geordin Hill-Lewis confirmed that the party was open to forming coalitions with numerous other like-minded parties, and had reached out to many of them over the preceding 24 hours. He said the DA was determined to improve service delivery in municipalities where previous councils had allowed it to fail.

On 9 November, it was reported that ActionSA leader Herman Mashaba had offered the DA a coalition deal, and was waiting for the DA's response. Mashaba said if the DA was willing to agree to ActionSA member Nasiphi Moya running Tshwane, then for its part, ActionSA would enable the DA to run the City of Johannesburg and Ekurhuleni. He said the deal would work on condition that the DA selected someone other than Helen Zille to be the Mayor of Joburg, and said he believed the DA had many other suitable candidates for the position.

== Results at national level ==
The below table includes all parties that obtained at least a 0.1% share of the total valid proportional representation (PR) votes cast nationally. With 14,880,882 valid PR votes reported for the 2026 elections, this equates to all parties who received at least 14,881 votes. The total number of parties to achieve at least that number of PR votes was 29.

National proportional representation results
Party	2021		2026		Change (pp)
Party	Votes	%	Votes	%	Change (pp)
African National Congress	5,407,329	46.14%	4,595,190	30.88%	▼15.26
Democratic Alliance	2,549,000	21.75%	3,682,395	24.75%	▲3.00
uMkhonto weSizwe Party	0	0.00%	1,462,044	9.82%	New
Economic Freedom Fighters	1,225,665	10.46%	929,100	6.24%	▼4.21
ActionSA	306,167	2.61%	896,300	6.02%	▲3.41
Inkatha Freedom Party	685,414	5.85%	697,212	4.69%	▼1.16
Freedom Front Plus	273,757	2.34%	448,767	3.02%	▲0.68
South African Communist Party	0	0.00%	340,925	2.29%	New
Patriotic Alliance	114,765	0.98%	287,304	1.93%	▲0.95
African Transformation Movement	70,904	0.60%	154,735	1.04%	▲0.43
United Democratic Movement	60,301	0.51%	112,982	0.76%	▲0.24
Afrika Mayibuye Movement	0	0.00%	91,033	0.61%	New
African Christian Democratic Party	93,137	0.79%	66,679	0.45%	▼0.35
Service Delivery Party	0	0.00%	64,378	0.43%	New
Pan Africanist Congress of Azania	32,262	0.28%	51,254	0.34%	▲0.07
Al Jama-ah	25,915	0.22%	49,831	0.33%	▲0.11
African Independent Congress	73,036	0.62%	39,497	0.27%	▼0.36
Good	74,194	0.63%	35,460	0.24%	▼0.39
Rise Mzansi	0	0.00%	33,095	0.22%	New
National Coloured Congress	26,818	0.23%	30,889	0.21%	▼0.02
United Africans Transformation	0	0.00%	28,837	0.19%	New
National Freedom Party	61,077	0.52%	23,391	0.16%	▼0.36
African Content Movement	2,225	0.02%	22,066	0.15%	▲0.13
African Congress for Transformation	0	0.00%	19,471	0.13%	New
African People's Convention	21,282	0.18%	19,060	0.13%	▼0.05
Build One South Africa	0	0.00%	18,384	0.12%	New
Labour Party	0	0.00%	17,821	0.12%	New
On the Move	0	0.00%	17,481	0.12%	New
People's Movement for Change	811	0.01%	16,175	0.11%	▲0.10
Others	616,552	5.26%	629,126	4.23%	▼1.03
Total	11,720,611	100.00%	14,880,882	100.00%	—

== Results by province ==
The below tables show the distribution of seats among political parties in individual municipal councils. They cover South Africa's three categories of municipalities – metropolitan, district, and local.

=== Eastern Cape ===
==== Metropolitan municipalities ====
Buffalo City
Party	2021 seats	2026 seats	Change
African National Congress (ANC)	61	42	▼19
United Democratic Movement (UDM)	1	19	▲18
Democratic Alliance (DA)	20	17	▼3
Economic Freedom Fighters (EFF)	13	7	▼6
South African Communist Party (SACP)	0	5	▲5
ActionSA	0	2	▲2
African Transformation Movement (ATM)	1	2	▲1
Patriotic Alliance (PA)	0	2	▲2
African Independent Congress (AIC)	1	1	Steady
Freedom Front Plus (FF Plus)	1	1	Steady
Pan Africanist Congress of Azania (PAC)	1	1	Steady
uMkhonto weSizwe Party (MK)	0	1	▲1
African Christian Democratic Party (ACDP)	1	0	▼1
Total	100	100	Steady

Nelson Mandela Bay
Party	2021 seats	2026 seats	Change
Democratic Alliance (DA)	48	53	▲5
African National Congress (ANC)	48	32	▼16
Economic Freedom Fighters (EFF)	8	7	▼1
Patriotic Alliance (PA)	2	4	▲2
South African Communist Party (SACP)	0	4	▲4
Freedom Front Plus (FF Plus)	2	3	▲1
United Democratic Movement (UDM)	1	3	▲2
ActionSA	0	2	▲2
Mayibuye Civic Movement (MCM)	0	2	▲2
uMkhonto weSizwe Party (MK)	0	2	▲2
African Christian Democratic Party (ACDP)	2	1	▼1
African Independent Congress (AIC)	1	1	Steady
African Transformation Movement (ATM)	0	1	▲1
Afrika Mayibuye Movement	0	1	▲1
Democratic Movement (DM)	0	1	▲1
National Alliance (formerly Northern Alliance)	3	1	▼2
Pan Africanist Congress of Azania (PAC)	1	1	Steady
United Progressive People Alliance (UPPA)	0	1	▲1
Abantu Integrity Movement (AIM)	1	0	▼1
Defenders of the People (DOP)	2	0	▼2
Good	1	0	▼1
Total	120	120	Steady

==== Other municipalities ====
—

=== Free State ===
==== Metropolitan municipalities ====
Mangaung
Party	2021 seats	2026 seats	Change
African National Congress (ANC)	51	35	▼16
Democratic Alliance (DA)	26	34	▲8
Economic Freedom Fighters (EFF)	12	9	▼3
Freedom Front Plus (FF Plus)	5	6	▲1
Patriotic Alliance (PA)	2	4	▲2
ActionSA	0	3	▲3
South African Communist Party (SACP)	0	2	▲2
African Christian Democratic Party (ACDP)	1	1	Steady
African Cultural Identity Movement (ACIM)	0	1	▲1
African Independent Congress (AIC)	1	1	Steady
African Transformation Movement (ATM)	1	1	Steady
Afrikan Alliance of Social Democrats (AASD)	2	1	▼1
Mangaung Seven People's Voice (MSPV)	0	1	▲1
National Service Delivery Forum (NSDF)	0	1	▲1
uMkhonto weSizwe Party (MK)	0	1	▲1
Total	101	101	Steady

==== Other municipalities ====
—

=== Gauteng ===
==== Metropolitan municipalities ====
City of Ekurhuleni
Party	2021 seats	2026 seats	Change
Democratic Alliance (DA)	65	66	▲1
African National Congress (ANC)	86	59	▼27
ActionSA	15	40	▲25
uMkhonto weSizwe Party (MK)	0	15	▲15
Economic Freedom Fighters (EFF)	31	14	▼17
Freedom Front Plus (FF Plus)	8	11	▲3
Inkatha Freedom Party (IFP)	3	3	Steady
Patriotic Alliance (PA)	4	3	▼1
African Transformation Movement (ATM)	1	2	▲1
Rise Mzansi	0	2	▲2
South African Communist Party (SACP)	0	2	▲2
African Christian Democratic Party (ACDP)	2	1	▼1
African Independent Congress (AIC)	3	1	▼2
Afrika Mayibuye Movement	0	1	▲1
Build One South Africa (BOSA)	0	1	▲1
Pan Africanist Congress of Azania (PAC)	1	1	Steady
The Movement for Social Justice (MSJ)	0	1	▲1
United Africans Transformation (UAT)	0	1	▲1
Congress of the People (COPE)	1	0	▼1
Independent Citizens Movement (ICM)	1	0	▼1
Independent Ratepayers Association of South Africa (IRASA)	1	0	▼1
National Freedom Party (NFP)	1	0	▼1
United Democratic Movement (UDM)	1	0	▼1
Total	224	224	Steady

City of Johannesburg
Party	2021 seats	2026 seats	Change
Democratic Alliance (DA)	71	91	▲20
African National Congress (ANC)	91	63	▼28
ActionSA	44	43	▼1
Economic Freedom Fighters (EFF)	29	17	▼12
uMkhonto weSizwe Party (MK)	0	15	▲15
Inkatha Freedom Party (IFP)	7	7	Steady
Freedom Front Plus (FF Plus)	4	5	▲1
Patriotic Alliance (PA)	8	5	▼3
Rise Mzansi	0	5	▲5
African Transformation Movement (ATM)	1	3	▲2
Al Jama-ah	3	3	Steady
African Christian Democratic Party (ACDP)	3	2	▼1
Afrika Mayibuye Movement	0	2	▲2
South African Communist Party (SACP)	0	2	▲2
African Heart Congress (AHC)	1	1	Steady
African Independent Congress (AIC)	2	1	▼1
African People's Convention (APC)	1	1	Steady
Build One South Africa (BOSA)	0	1	▲1
Economic Liberators Forum South Africa (ELF-SA)	0	1	▲1
Pan Africanist Congress of Azania (PAC)	1	1	Steady
People's Movement for Change (PMC)	0	1	▲1
Congress of the People (COPE)	1	0	▼1
Good	1	0	▼1
United Democratic Movement (UDM)	1	0	▼1
United Independent Movement (UIM)	1	0	▼1
Total	270	270	Steady

City of Tshwane
Party	2021 seats	2026 seats	Change
Democratic Alliance (DA)	69	74	▲5
ActionSA	19	48	▲29
African National Congress (ANC)	75	44	▼31
Freedom Front Plus (FF Plus)	17	17	Steady
Economic Freedom Fighters (EFF)	23	13	▼10
uMkhonto weSizwe Party (MK)	0	4	▲4
South African Communist Party (SACP)	0	3	▲3
Patriotic Alliance (PA)	1	2	▲1
African Christian Democratic Party (ACDP)	2	1	▼1
African Independent Congress (AIC)	1	1	Steady
African Transformation Movement (ATM)	1	1	Steady
Afrika Mayibuye Movement	0	1	▲1
Build One South Africa (BOSA)	0	1	▲1
Rise Mzansi	0	1	▲1
Security Personnel Party of South Africa (SPPSA)	0	1	▲1
Service Delivery Party (SDP)	0	1	▲1
United Africans Transformation (UAT)	0	1	▲1
Congress of the People (COPE)	1	0	▼1
Defenders of the People (DOP)	1	0	▼1
Good	1	0	▼1
Inkatha Freedom Party (IFP)	1	0	▼1
Pan Africanist Congress of Azania (PAC)	1	0	▼1
Republican Conference of Tshwane (RCT)	1	0	▼1
Total	214	214	Steady

==== Other municipalities ====
—

=== KwaZulu-Natal ===
==== Metropolitan municipalities ====
eThekwini
Party	2021 seats	2026 seats	Change
uMkhonto weSizwe Party (MK)	0	86	▲86
Democratic Alliance (DA)	59	57	▼2
African National Congress (ANC)	96	37	▼59
Inkatha Freedom Party (IFP)	16	15	▼1
ActionSA	4	7	▲3
Economic Freedom Fighters (EFF)	24	4	▼20
African Transformation Movement (ATM)	1	2	▲1
eThekwini Ratepayers Political Movement (ERPM)	0	2	▲2
Freedom Front Plus (FF Plus)	1	2	▲1
1860NIC Congress	0	1	▲1
African Christian Democratic Party (ACDP)	2	1	▼1
African Independent Congress (AIC)	2	1	▼1
Al Jama-ah	1	1	Steady
Democratic Liberal Congress (DLC)	1	1	Steady
Independent People's Party (IPP)	0	1	▲1
Minority Front (MF)	1	1	Steady
Patriotic Alliance (PA)	0	1	▲1
People's Freedom Party (PFP)	1	1	Steady
People's Revolutionary Movement (PRM)	1	1	Steady
South African Communist Party (SACP)	0	1	▲1
Abantu Batho Congress (ABC)	2	0	▼2
Active Citizens Coalition (ACC)	2	0	▼2
African Democratic Change (ADEC)	1	0	▼1
African People First (APF)	1	0	▼1
Justice and Employment Party (JEP)	1	0	▼1
KZN Independence (KZNI)	1	0	▼1
Minorities of South Africa (MOSA)	1	0	▼1
National Freedom Party (NFP)	1	0	▼1
Truly Alliance (TA)	1	0	▼1
United Independent Movement (UIM)	1	0	▼1
Total	222	223	▲1

==== Other municipalities ====
—

=== Limpopo ===
==== Other municipalities ====
—

=== Mpumalanga ===
==== Other municipalities ====
—

=== North West ===
==== Other municipalities ====
—

=== Northern Cape ===
==== Other municipalities ====
—

=== Western Cape ===
==== Metropolitan municipalities ====
City of Cape Town
Party	2021 seats	2026 seats	Change
Democratic Alliance (DA)	135	133	▼2
African National Congress (ANC)	43	33	▼10
Economic Freedom Fighters (EFF)	10	9	▼1
Patriotic Alliance (PA)	4	9	▲5
Freedom Front Plus (FF Plus)	4	8	▲4
ActionSA	0	7	▲7
Al Jama-ah	3	6	▲3
Good	9	6	▼3
National Coloured Congress (NCC)	7	5	▼2
African Christian Democratic Party (ACDP)	6	3	▼3
United Democratic Movement (UDM)	1	3	▲2
African Transformation Movement (ATM)	0	2	▲2
South African Communist Party (SACP)	0	2	▲2
African Independent Congress (AIC)	1	1	Steady
Africa Restoration Alliance (ARA)	2	1	▼1
Build One South Africa (BOSA)	0	1	▲1
Cape Independence Party (CAPEXIT)	2	1	▼1
Cape Muslim Congress (CMC)	1	1	Steady
Hopeful Leaders Democrats (HLD)	0	1	▲1
uMkhonto weSizwe Party (MK)	0	1	▲1
Pan Africanist Congress of Azania (PAC)	1	1	Steady
People's Movement for Change (PMC)	0	1	▲1
Democratic Independent Party (DIP)	1	0	▼1
United Independent Movement (UIM)	1	0	▼1
Total	231	235	▲4

==== Other municipalities ====
—

== Metro council overview ==
Metro	Total seats	Seats required for majority	Largest party	Seats won	Gap	Status	Ref
Buffalo City	100	51	ANC	42	9 short	No overall majority	
City of Cape Town	235	118	DA	133	+15	Majority	
City of Johannesburg	270	136	DA	91	45 short	No overall majority	
City of Tshwane	214	108	DA	74	34 short	No overall majority	
Ekurhuleni	224	113	DA	66	47 short	No overall majority	
eThekwini	223	112	MKP	86	26 short	No overall majority	
Mangaung	101	51	ANC	35	16 short	No overall majority	
Nelson Mandela Bay	120	61	DA	53	8 short	No overall majority	
