= Elegy (art installation) =

Art installation by Gabrielle Goliath

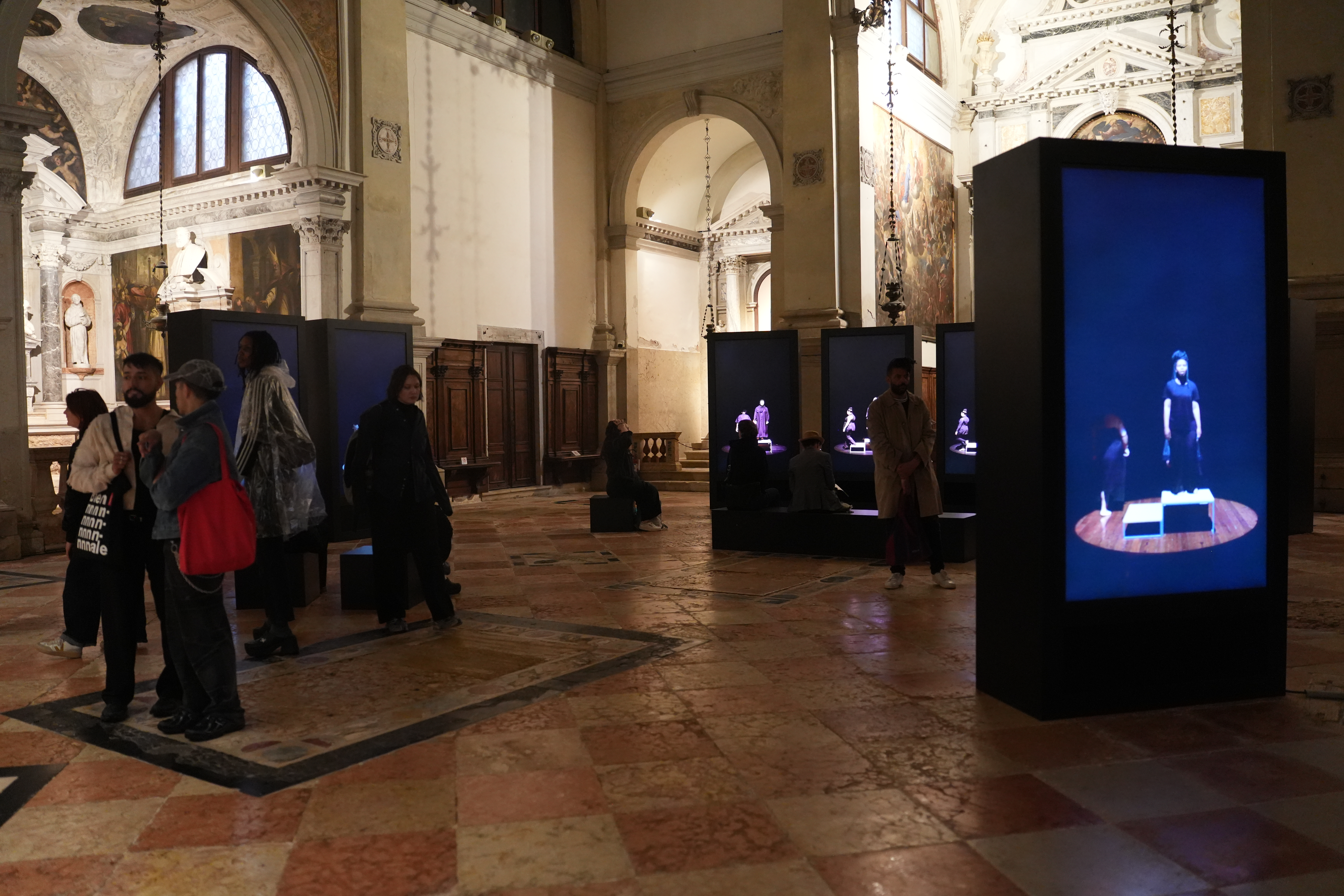
- Artist: Gabrielle Goliath
- Year: 2015-
- Medium: video and performance art

Elegy is an ongoing art installation by South African artist Gabrielle Goliath consisting of performance and video that has many different iterations.

== History ==
The exhibit was originally conceived in 2015. An early version addressed killings of trans and gay people in South Africa as well as the Herero and Nama massacre conducted by German colonial forces in the 1900s in what is now Namibia. Another iteration, consisting of video, honors Palestinian poet Hiba Abu Nada, who died in an Israeli airstrike in October 2023. It was selected to represent South Africa at the 2026 Venice Biennale.

== 2026 Venice Biennale Controversy ==
Elegy was selected by an independent committee in December 2025 to represent South Africa in a pavilion curated by Ingrid Masondo.

However, the South African Minister of Sport, Arts and Culture — Gayton McKenzie — canceled the pavilion in January 2026 just days before the deadline for countries to submit their proposals to the Biennale, calling the Elegy exhibit "highly divisive." The decision was appealed in court but were rejected.

Instead, the exhibit was presented at the church, Chiesa di Sant’Antonin, in Venice’s Castello district with the sponsorship of the Bertha Foundation and the London arts organization Ibraaz.
