= Next South African general election =

- By 2029

All 400 seats to the National Assembly 201 seats needed for a majority
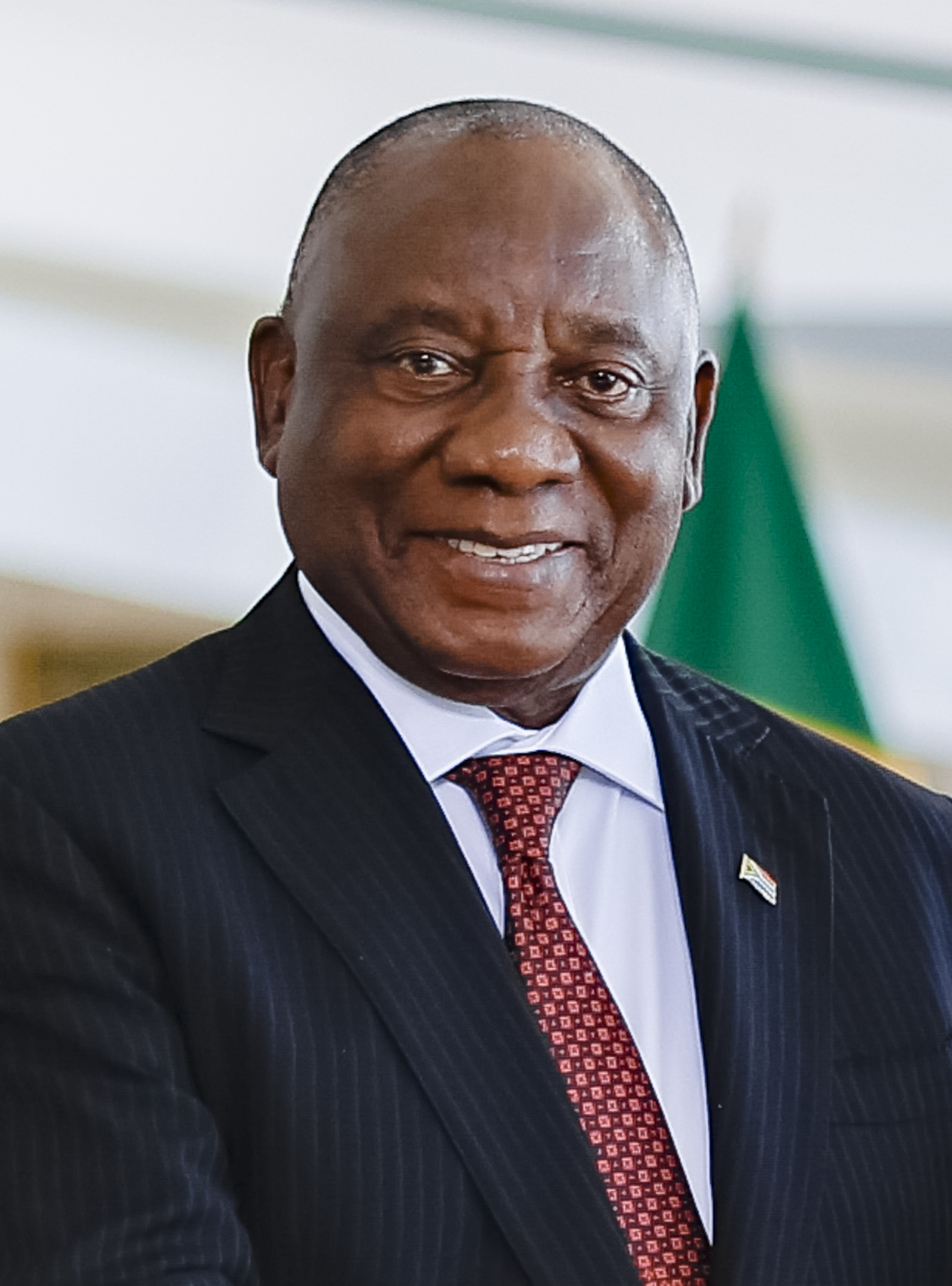

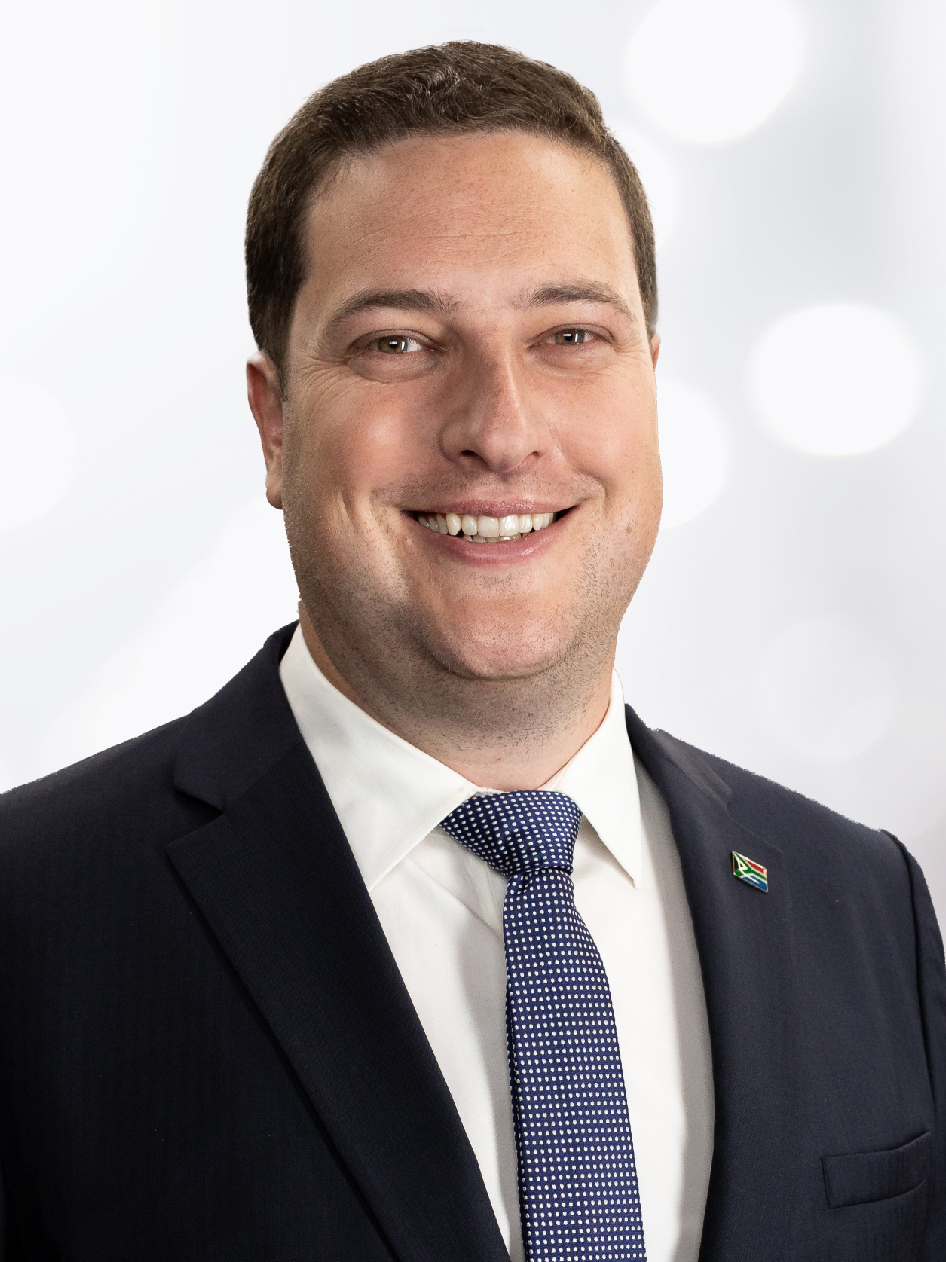

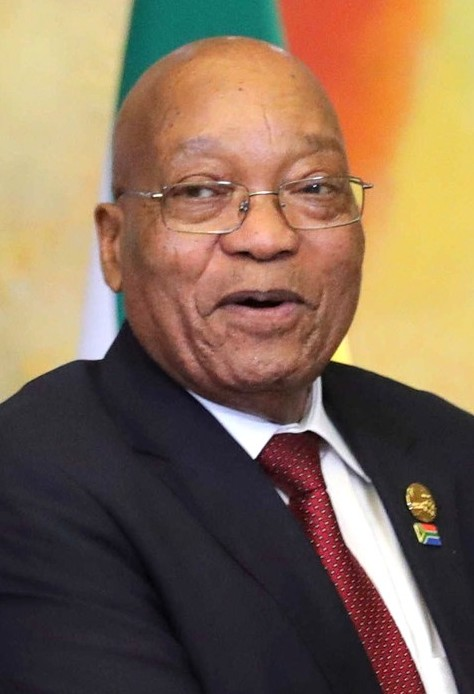

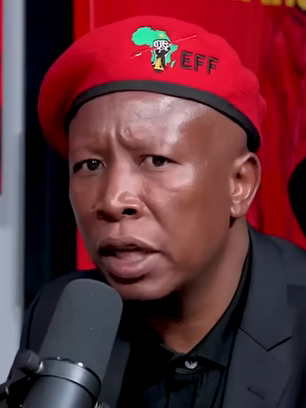

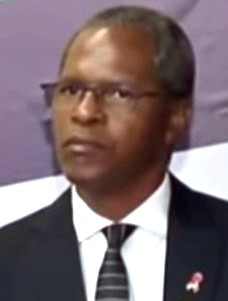

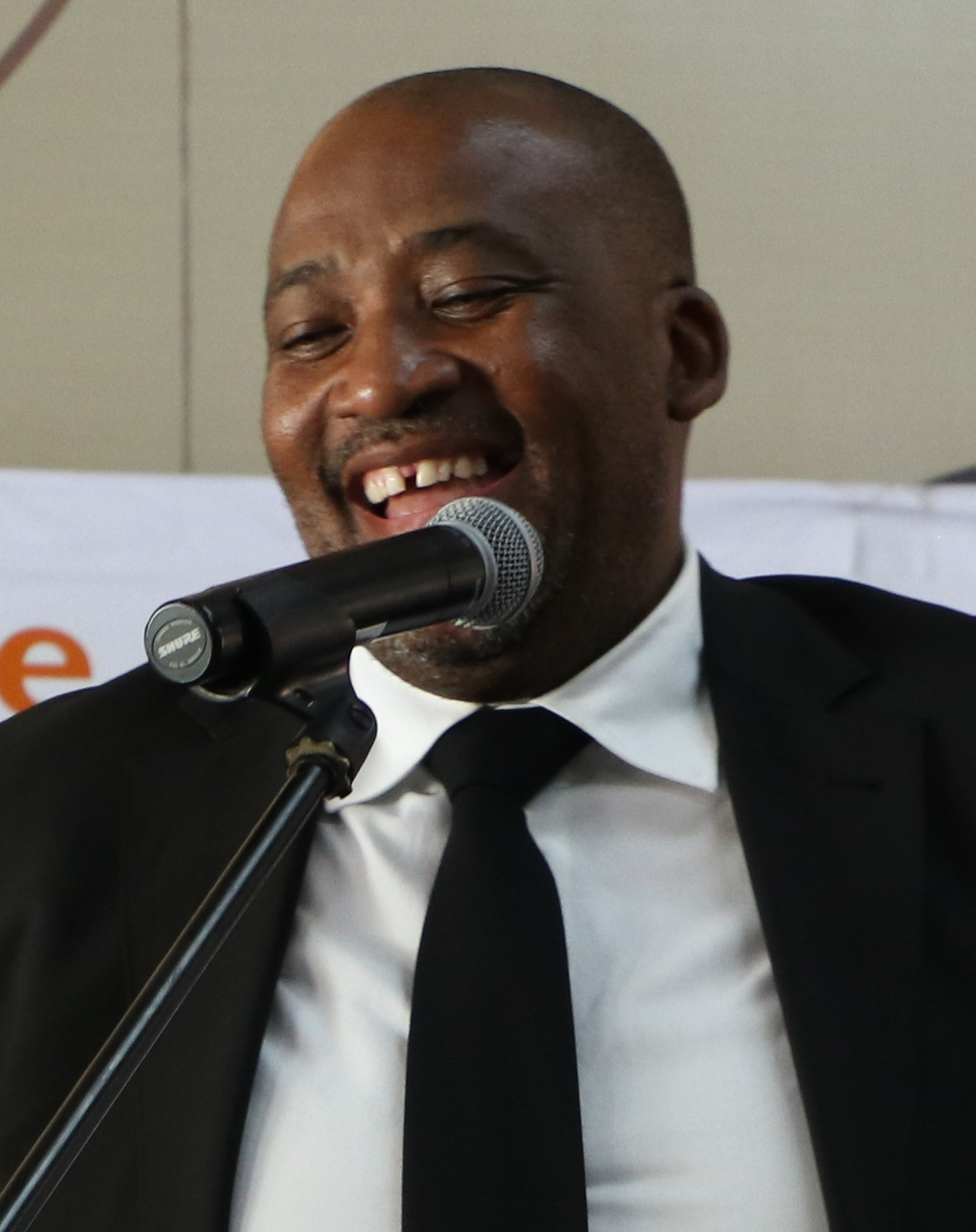
Leader	Cyril Ramaphosa (Note: While Ramaphosa remains leader of the ANC, he is Constitutionally ineligible to serve another presidential term)	Geordin Hill-Lewis	Jacob Zuma
Party	ANC	DA	MK
Last election	40.18%, 159 seats	21.81%, 87 seats	14.58%, 58 seats
Leader	Julius Malema	Velenkosini Hlabisa	Gayton McKenzie
Party	EFF	IFP	PA
Last election	9.52%, 39 seats	3.85%, 17 seats	2.06%, 9 seats
Incumbent President
Cyril Ramaphosa
Government of National Unity

The next South African general election will be held by 2029 to elect a new National Assembly as well as the provincial legislature in each province of South Africa. They will be the eighth elections held under the conditions of universal adult suffrage since the end of the apartheid era in 1994.

== Date ==
The South African Constitution mandates that national and provincial general elections must be held at least once every five years. Specifically, the elections must take place within 90 days of the date the National Assembly's five-year term expires or is dissolved. The most recent general election was held on 29 May 2024. This means the next general election for the National Assembly and provincial legislatures is constitutionally due to occur by 26 August 2029.

The election will occur approximately three years after the next South African local government elections, which are scheduled to take place on 4 November 2026.

== Electoral system ==
The electoral system used in the 2029 election is expected to change based on the recommendations of the Electoral Reform Consultation Panel. The Electoral Reform Consultation Panel established by Parliament recommended reducing the size of the current provincial constituencies into smaller multi-member, or single-member constituencies to bring representatives closer to voters while maintaining a compensatory list to ensure overall proportionality of results.

== Background ==
Having served two terms as President of South Africa, ANC leader Cyril Ramaphosa is not eligible to serve as President beyond the 2029 election. This is as per the two-term limit under Section 88(2) of the Constitution of South Africa.

The 2029 election will be the first general election in which Geordin Hill-Lewis leads the Democratic Alliance, after he became leader of the party in April 2026. Hill-Lewis was leader of the DA during the 2026 South African municipal elections.

== Opinion polls ==
Polling organisation	Fieldwork date	Sample size	Margin of error	ANC	DA	MK	EFF	IFP	PA	ASA	Others	Don't know (Note: Includes abstention and no answer responses)	Lead
SABI Strategy Group/News24	Aug – Sep 2026	1,000	3.2%	31.6%	25.2%	14.7%	12.2%	3.5%	2.4%	2.9%	7.2%	-	6.4
SRF/The Common Sense	Jul 2026	2,144	-	34%	27%	15%	7%	5%	-	-	-	-	7
IPSOS	Jun – Jul 2026	3,600	1.8%	31%	25%	14%	11%	3%	2%	6%	5%	3%	6
SRF/The Common Sense	Mar 2026	2,222	2.1%	39%	28%	10%	6%	5%	3%	3%	4%	-	11
Ipsos	Dec 2025 – Jan 2026	3,600	1.9%	33%	22%	10%	11%	2%	2%	—N/a	10%	12%	11
SRF	Jun 2025	1,004	4%	40%	26%	18%	3%	3%	3%	—N/a	—N/a	—N/a	14
IRR	Mar – Apr 2025	807	~4%	29.7%	30.3%	15.9%	10.2%	1.7%	—N/a	—N/a	—N/a	—N/a	0.6
SRF	Feb 2025	1,004	4%	32%	25%	12%	6%	3%	3%	—N/a	—N/a	—N/a	7
Brenthurst Foundation	Feb – Mar 2025	3,837	2%	43%	27%	11%	7%	2%	3%	2%	5%	—N/a	16
IRR	Sep – Oct 2024	—N/a	—N/a	41.3%	22.3%	11.6%	6.9%	5.5%	—N/a	—N/a	—N/a	—N/a	19
SRF	Sep 2024	1,204	3%	45%	24%	12%	6%	5%	5%	—N/a	—N/a	—N/a	21
2024 election	29 May 2024			40.1%	21.8%	14.5%	9.5%	3.8%	2%	1.2%	7.1%		18.3
