= National Coloured Congress =

Political party in South Africa

- Abbreviation: NCC (officially CCC)
- President: Fadiel Adams
- Chairperson: Fazloodien Abrahams
- Secretary-General: Sakiena Frenchman
- Spokesperson: Fadiel Adams
- National Treasurer: Ebrahim Burton
- National Organiser: Nasmi Jacobs
- National Convenor: Desmond Syce
- Founder: Fadiel Adams
- Founded: August 2020
- Headquarters: Lansdowne, Cape Town
- Ideology: Cape Coloured interests
- Colours: Black
- Slogan: "Let's Move South Africa Forward."
- National Assembly: 2 / 400
- NCOP: 0 / 90
- Western Cape Provincial Parliament: 1 / 42
- Cape Town City Council: 7 / 231

Website
- nationalcolouredcongress.org.za

The National Coloured Congress (NCC; previously the Cape Coloured Congress, CCC) is a South African political party led by Fadiel Adams, the founder of the Gatvol Capetonian Movement. The party was formed in August 2020 and focuses on issues affecting Coloured South Africans, initially in the Western Cape, and later nationally.

Some policies proposed at some point by the party include obtaining officially "full recognition" of Cape Coloured people as "First Nation descendants", meaning descendants of the Khoisan people, fighting against "all forms" of discrimination and notably against coloured people, and also discrimination against LGBTQ people, the eradication of gender-based violence, the prohibition of comprehensive sex education in schools, and the reintroduction of the death penalty for rapists and murderers.

The party contested the 2021 municipal elections with Adams running as the party's mayoral candidate in the City of Cape Town. The party won seven council seats in Cape Town and one seat in the Saldanha Bay Local Municipality.

In 2023, the party renamed itself from the Cape Coloured Congress to the National Coloured Congress, and contested the 2024 South African general election, winning two seats in the national parliament and one in the Western Cape.

In May 2025, the NCC tabled, and subsequently lost, a motion of no confidence against Cape Town Mayor Geordin Hill-Lewis. Hill-Lewis was shown to be broadly popular amongst his fellow Council members, when he won the motion by a significant margin (138 against vs 46 in favor).

The motion was seen to be a spiteful endeavor to detract from an ongoing court case the City of Cape Town has against the NCC's leader, Fadiel Adams, for racist remarks he made. Hill-Lewis said at the time of the motion that the NCC's actions were frivolous, and that the party should be better for the residents of Cape Town in terms of their general interactions in Council meetings.

== Election results ==
=== National Assembly elections ===
Election	Party leader	Total votes	Share of vote	Seats	+/–	Government
2024	Fadiel Adams	37,422	0.23% (Note: From 2024, seats in the National Assembly are determined by a combination of the national ballot, and the nine regional ballots. Only the national ballot figures are shown here.)	2 / 400	New	Opposition

=== National Council of Provinces ===
Election	Total # of seats won	+/–	Government
2024	0 / 90	New	Extraparliamentary opposition

=== Provincial elections ===
Election	Eastern Cape		Free State		Gauteng		Kwazulu-Natal		Limpopo		Mpumalanga		North-West		Northern Cape		Western Cape	
Election	%	Seats	%	Seats	%	Seats	%	Seats	%	Seats	%	Seats	%	Seats	%	Seats	%	Seats
2024																	2.38	1/42

=== Municipal elections ===
Election	Votes	%
2021	54,858	0.18%
