= Independent People's Party =

Independent People's Party may refer to:

- Independent People's Party (Ghana)
- Independent People's Party (Kingdom of Croatia)
- Independent People's Party (Luxembourg)
