= Fadiel Adams =

South African politician

Member of the National Assembly of South Africa
- Incumbent
- Assumed office 14 June 2024

President of the National Coloured Congress
- Incumbent
- Assumed office August 2020
- Preceded by: Party established

Personal details
- Born: Fadiel Adams; 14 June 1976 (age 50) Retreat, Cape Town, South Africa
- Party: National Coloured Congress (2020–present)
- Children: 4
- Occupation: politician; activist

Fadiel Adams (born 14 June 1976) is a South African politician and founder of the National Coloured Congress.

== Early life ==
Adams was the third of six children. His father was a builder and his mother a seamstress. Adams dropped out of school in Grade 11, and got involved in gangs and drugs. By age 30, he was homeless and addicted.

After going clean, Adams worked as a tiler and plumber.

== Politics ==
Adams got involved in politics in 2018 after the Siqalo riots in Mitchells Plain in 2018. After searching for his brother, who had been arrested, an interview shot him to prominence. In June 2018, Adams co-founded "Gatvol Capetonian", an organisation which described itself as "a group of gatvol [fed up] Capetonians who are sick of racist B.E.E. policies, poor service delivery and crime".

In 2020, Adams founded the Cape Coloured Congress and was elected to the Cape Town City Council in the 2021 South African municipal elections.

In 2023, the party renamed itself the National Coloured Congress, intending to contest the 2024 South African general election. The party won two seats, with Adams elected to national parliament.

During February and March 2023, Adams made derogatory remarks about City of Cape Town Manager Lungelo Mbandazayo, during Facebook Live broadcasts. The South African Equality Court ruled that Adams' comments were racially offensive, unfair discrimination, hate speech, and harassment. Adams was ordered to apologize to Mbandazayo as a result.

On 3 July 2025, the Joint Committee on Ethics and Members' Interests found Adams guilty of breaching parliament's ethic code following a nine-minute video which he shared on Facebook in February 2025, in which he made derogatory remarks against the Mayor of Cape Town Geordin Hill-Lewis, a female member of the Democratic Alliance and the DA as a party. The committee's report recommended that Adams be reprimanded, suspended from parliament for 15 days, and have his parliamentary salary deducted over the period. Adams apologised to parliament on 23 July 2025.

== Arrest ==
On 5 May 2026, Adams was arrested by the Political Killings Task Team (PKTT) on charges of fraud and defeating or obstructing the course of justice. Police stated that "the task team discovered that Mr Adams interfered with the now convicted and sentenced hitman at a very sensitive and advanced stage of the police’s investigation." This interference was in connection with the murder case of former ANC Youth League secretary general, Sindiso Magaqa who was killed in July 2017 in Umzimkhulu in KwaZulu-Natal .

=== Madlanga Commission ===
In August 2026, Adams appeared before the Madlanga Commission to answer questions concerning a sworn affidavit and classified Crime Intelligence documents linked to an investigation involving Dumisani Khumalo and other officials. His complaint contributed to the subsequent investigation into Khumalo. During his testimony, Adams claimed he had been experiencing problems with his parliament issued laptop for the past 18 months and stated that the parliament was aware of those issues and challenges. Parliament later disputed the claims, stating that its records did not support Adams's account of persistent laptop problems. When appearing for the second time before the commission, Adams admitted to having misled the commission about his request to testify on 3 October 2025.
