= Gabrielle Goliath =

South African contemporary artist

- Born: January 26, 1983 (age 43); Kimberley, South Africa
- Known for: Visual art, Video Art
- Movement: Feminism, Conceptual Art

Gabrielle Goliath (born 1983 in Kimberley, South Africa) is a South African contemporary artist who lives and works in Johannesburg, South Africa. Goliath is recognized for her immersive installations and performances that confront themes of violence, memory, and identity. Her work often centers on the experiences of marginalized communities. She is a researcher at the Institute for Creative Arts at the University of Cape Town, where her research continues to explore ethical strategies for addressing violence and absence in contemporary art.

== Artistic practice ==
Goliath’s practice centers on sonic and social forms that refuse spectacle and instead create conditions for witnessing. Her installations are often elegiac, ritualized, and participatory—dedicated to black, brown, femme, queer, and other historically dispossessed subjectivities. Her work resists the commodification of suffering and insists on new forms of presence through breath, lament, and collective voice.

In its profile on Goliath, ArtReview highlights her long-form performance Elegy (2015–ongoing), a powerful work that commemorates victims of gendered and queerphobic violence through the ritual of sustained vocal mourning. She recounts to artist Amadour, in an earlier interview for The Brooklyn Rail, that the work was first imagined after hearing the father of Ipeleng Christine Moholane speak publicly of his daughter’s death. “I began envisioning an artwork to counteract this abhorrent but normative brutality,” Goliath told Amadour. “How could I create something to refuse this order of violence—a space for others to participate and mourn?”

In the same conversation, Goliath spoke of the choral format as a conceptual framework for justice and shared grief:

“When one choir member runs out of breath and cannot sing anymore, there are other voices to carry on the lament. In this way, it’s not only about song, as such, but breath—a collective offering and holding of breath.”

=== 2026 Venice Biennale Controversy ===
In 2026, a controversy involving Goliath centered on the cancellation of her exhibition, Elegy, for the 61st Venice Biennale by Minister of Sport, Arts and Culture Gayton McKenzie. The exhibition was deemed "divisive" for referencing victims of gender-based violence, queer people, and victims of the Herero and Nama genocide. The controversy specifically targeted a section paying tribute to Hiba Abu Nada, a Palestinian poet killed in Gaza, leading to accusations of censorship, a lawsuit by the artist, and South Africa's eventual withdrawal from the Biennale. The incident sparked international concern regarding artistic freedom and institutional integrity. Goliath instead moved her exhibition to the nearby Chiesa di Sant'antonin.

== Notable works ==
- Berenice 10–28 (2010) and Berenice 29–39 (2022): Commemorative photographic portraits for a childhood friend lost to domestic violence. Each image represents a year since her death.
- Roulette (2014): A chilling audio installation that replays a gunshot at statistically accurate intervals to represent the frequency of femicide in South Africa.
- Elegy (2015–ongoing): A ritualized sonic performance in which opera singers sustain a note until breath fails—then another voice continues. Each iteration is dedicated to a murdered woman or LGBTQIA+ individual.
- This song is for... (2019): A 22-channel immersive installation that remixes songs chosen by survivors of rape, creating a healing space of re-memory and acknowledgment.
- Chorus (2021): A polyphonic lament by the University of Cape Town Choir in tribute to Uyinene Mrwetyana, projected opposite a list of victims of gender-based violence. A meditation on names, silence, and persistence.
- Personal Accounts (2013–ongoing): A multi-channel, transnational sound and video project that foregrounds nonverbal testimony in survivors’ expressions. Recent iterations appeared at the 60th Venice Biennale in 2024.

== Exhibitions and recognition ==
- Foreigners Everywhere, Venice Biennale (2024)
- Personal Accounts, Talbot Rice Gallery, Edinburgh (2024)
- Chorus, Dallas Contemporary (2022)
- Standard Bank Young Artist Award (2019)
- Future Generation Art Prize – Special Prize (2019)
- Institut Français Afrique en Créations Prize, Bamako Biennale (2017)

Her works are held in international collections including Tate Modern, Kunsthalle Zürich, Iziko South African National Gallery, Johannesburg Art Gallery, and Wits Art Museum.

== Legacy and Impact ==
Gabrielle Goliath’s work articulates a politics of refusal—refusal to normalize violence, to aestheticize pain, or to speak over survivors. Instead, her art offers what scholar Christina Sharpe might call “wake work”—an ongoing tending to Black and queer life in the aftermath of catastrophe.
