= Bergrivier Local Municipality elections =

Municipal elections in South Africa

The Bergrivier Local Municipality council consists of thirteen members elected by mixed-member proportional representation. Seven councillors are elected by first-past-the-post voting in seven wards, while the remaining six are chosen from party lists so that the total number of party representatives is proportional to the number of votes received.

In the election of 4 November 2026 the Democratic Alliance (DA) obtained a majority of nine seats on the council.

== Results ==
The following table shows the composition of the council after past elections.

Event	ANC	DA	PA	Other	Total
2000 election	6	7	—	0	13
2004 floor-crossing	7	5	—	1	13
2006 election	6	6	—	1	13
2011 election	5	7	—	1	13
2016 election	4	9	—	0	13
2021 election	3	8	1	1	13
2026 election	1	9	2	1	13

== December 2000 election ==
The following table shows the results of the 2000 election.

Party	Ward			List			Total seats
Party	Votes	%	Seats	Votes	%	Seats	Total seats
Democratic Alliance	6,124	51.22	5	6,242	52.19	2	7
African National Congress	5,338	44.64	2	5,424	45.35	4	6
African Christian Democratic Party	271	2.27	0	295	2.47	0	0
Independent candidates	224	1.87	0				0
Total	11,957	100.00	7	11,961	100.00	6	13
Valid votes	11,957	98.67		11,961	98.68		
Invalid/blank votes	161	1.33		160	1.32		
Total votes	12,118	100.00		12,121	100.00		
Registered voters/turnout	16,970	71.41		16,970	71.43		

=== By-elections from October 2002 to August 2004 ===
The following by-elections were held to fill vacant ward seats in the period between the floor crossing periods in October 2002 and September 2004.

Date	Ward	Party of the previous councillor	Party of the newly elected councillor
23 June 2004	5	Democratic Alliance	African National Congress

=== September 2004 floor crossing ===
In terms of the Eighth Amendment of the Constitution, in the period from 1–15 September 2004 councillors had the opportunity to cross the floor to a different political party without losing their seats. In the Bergrivier council one Democratic Alliance councillor left the party to sit as an independent.

Party	Seats before	Net change	Seats after
African National Congress	7	0	7
Democratic Alliance	6	▼1	5
Independent	—	▲1	1

== March 2006 election ==
The following table shows the results of the 2006 election.

Party	Ward			List			Total seats
Party	Votes	%	Seats	Votes	%	Seats	Total seats
African National Congress	6,190	46.95	4	6,003	45.57	2	6
Democratic Alliance	5,704	43.26	3	5,686	43.16	3	6
Independent Democrats	1,113	8.44	0	1,227	9.31	1	1
African Christian Democratic Party	42	0.32	0	157	1.19	0	0
United Democratic Movement	42	0.32	0	100	0.76	0	0
Independent candidates	93	0.71	0				0
Total	13,184	100.00	7	13,173	100.00	6	13
Valid votes	13,184	99.07		13,173	98.97		
Invalid/blank votes	124	0.93		137	1.03		
Total votes	13,308	100.00		13,310	100.00		
Registered voters/turnout	20,827	63.90		20,827	63.91		

=== By-elections from September 2007 to May 2011 ===
The following by-elections were held to fill vacant ward seats in the period between the floor crossing period in September 2007 and the election in May 2011.

Date	Ward	Party of the previous councillor	Party of the newly elected councillor
10 December 2008	4	African National Congress	Independent (Note: The former councillor was re-elected to the ward as an independent.)
24 February 2010	1	Democratic Alliance	Democratic Alliance

== May 2011 election ==
The following table shows the results of the 2011 election.

Party	Ward			List			Total seats
Party	Votes	%	Seats	Votes	%	Seats	Total seats
Democratic Alliance	7,942	53.08	5	7,934	52.96	2	7
African National Congress	5,196	34.73	1	5,241	34.99	4	5
Congress of the People	1,700	11.36	1	1,677	11.19	0	1
The Peoples Independent Civic Organisation	91	0.61	0	88	0.59	0	0
South African Progressive Civic Organisation	34	0.23	0	40	0.27	0	0
Total	14,963	100.00	7	14,980	100.00	6	13
Valid votes	14,963	99.03		14,980	99.17		
Invalid/blank votes	147	0.97		125	0.83		
Total votes	15,110	100.00		15,105	100.00		
Registered voters/turnout	23,213	65.09		23,213	65.07		

=== By-elections from May 2011 to August 2016 ===
The following by-elections were held to fill vacant ward seats in the period between the elections in May 2011 and August 2016.

Date	Ward	Party of the previous councillor	Party of the newly elected councillor
7 August 2013	5	Democratic Alliance	Democratic Alliance

== August 2016 election ==
The following table shows the results of the 2016 election.

Party	Ward			List			Total seats
Party	Votes	%	Seats	Votes	%	Seats	Total seats
Democratic Alliance	10,450	64.06	7	10,405	64.10	2	9
African National Congress	5,324	32.63	0	5,295	32.62	4	4
Freedom Front Plus	326	2.00	0	290	1.79	0	0
Economic Freedom Fighters	185	1.13	0	195	1.20	0	0
The Peoples Independent Civic Organisation				48	0.30	0	0
Independent candidates	29	0.18	0				0
Total	16,314	100.00	7	16,233	100.00	6	13
Valid votes	16,314	99.28		16,233	98.93		
Invalid/blank votes	118	0.72		175	1.07		
Total votes	16,432	100.00		16,408	100.00		
Registered voters/turnout	26,310	62.46		26,310	62.36		

The local council sends two representatives to the council of the West Coast District Municipality: one from the Democratic Alliance and one from the African National Congress.

=== By-elections from August 2016 to November 2021 ===
The DA subsequently lost one seat to the African National Congress (ANC) in a by-election on 23 August 2017. However, the DA won the ward back in another by-election held on 16 January 2019. The 2016 council composition was thus restored.

Date	Ward	Party of the previous councillor	Party of the newly elected councillor
23 August 2017	5	Democratic Alliance	African National Congress
16 January 2019	5	African National Congress	Democratic Alliance

== November 2021 election ==
The following table shows the results of the 2021 election.

Party	Ward			List			Total seats
Party	Votes	%	Seats	Votes	%	Seats	Total seats
Democratic Alliance	9,263	62.09	7	9,269	62.10	1	8
African National Congress	2,970	19.91	0	2,937	19.68	3	3
Patriotic Alliance	1,043	6.99	0	1,060	7.10	1	1
Good	591	3.96	0	622	4.17	1	1
Freedom Front Plus	596	3.99	0	606	4.06	0	0
Economic Freedom Fighters	229	1.53	0	226	1.51	0	0
Cape Independence Party	76	0.51	0	96	0.64	0	0
Africa Restoration Alliance	38	0.25	0	43	0.29	0	0
Independent candidates	61	0.41	0				0
United Democratic Movement	28	0.19	0	33	0.22	0	0
Sizwe Ummah Nation	24	0.16	0	33	0.22	0	0
Total	14,919	100.00	7	14,925	100.00	6	13
Valid votes	14,919	99.25		14,925	99.28		
Invalid/blank votes	112	0.75		108	0.72		
Total votes	15,031	100.00		15,033	100.00		
Registered voters/turnout	27,541	54.58		27,541	54.58		

=== By-elections from November 2021 ===
The following by-elections were held to fill vacant ward seats in the period from November 2021. In ward 21, the DA candidate had their party membership terminated after switching to ActionSA, and in the by-election held on 31 August 2022, the DA candidate retained the seat for the party.

Date	Ward	Party of the previous councillor	Party of the newly elected councillor
23 Jul 2025	1	Democratic Alliance	Democratic Alliance

== November 2026 election ==
The following table shows the results of the 2026 election.

Party	Ward			List			Total seats
Party	Votes	%	Seats	Votes	%	Seats	Total seats
Democratic Alliance	11,684	64.58	7	11,551	63.91	2	9
Patriotic Alliance	2,427	13.41	0	3,265	18.06	2	2
African National Congress	1,825	10.09	0	1,357	7.51	1	1
Freedom Front Plus	938	5.18	0	1,022	5.65	1	1
Economic Freedom Fighters	376	2.08	0	348	1.93	0	0
Good	191	1.06	0	207	1.15	0	0
People's Movement for Change	154	0.85	0	105	0.58	0	0
South African Communist Party	100	0.55	0	84	0.46	0	0
Independent candidates	172	0.95	0				0
National Coloured Congress	83	0.46	0	28	0.15	0	0
Cape Independence Party	56	0.31	0	31	0.17	0	0
Organic Humanity Movement	25	0.14	0	25	0.14	0	0
African Transformation Movement	23	0.13	0	24	0.13	0	0
Afrika Mayibuye Movement	39	0.22	0	8	0.04	0	0
uMkhonto weSizwe Party				19	0.11	0	0
Total	18,093	100.00	7	18,074	100.00	6	13
Valid votes	18,093	98.60		18,074	99.19		
Invalid/blank votes	256	1.40		147	0.81		
Total votes	18,349	100.00		18,221	100.00		
Registered voters/turnout	32,950	55.69		32,950	55.30		
