= Saldanha Bay Local Municipality elections =

The Saldanha Bay Local Municipality consists of twenty-seven members elected by mixed-member proportional representation. Fourteen councillors are elected by first-past-the-post voting in fourteen wards, while the remaining thirteen are chosen from party lists so that the total number of party representatives is proportional to the number of votes received.

In the election of 4 November 2026 the Democratic Alliance (DA) obtained a plurality of fifteen seats on the council.

== Results ==
The following table shows the composition of the council after past elections.

Event	ANC	DA	IND	EFF	PA	Other	Total
2000 election	9	9	1	—	—	1	20
2002 floor-crossing	9	7	1	—	—	3	20
2004 floor-crossing	9	7	0	—	—	4	20
2006 election	9	6	2	—	—	6	23
2007 floor-crossing	10	6	1	—	—	6	23
2011 election	8	15	1	—	—	1	25
2016 election	8	17	0	1	—	1	27
2021 election	6	13	0	1	1	6	27
2026 election	4	15	0	1	6	5	31

== December 2000 election ==
The following table shows the results of the 2000 election.

Party	Ward			List			Total seats
Party	Votes	%	Seats	Votes	%	Seats	Total seats
African National Congress	7,706	45.12	4	8,553	50.31	5	9
Democratic Alliance	7,395	43.30	5	7,589	44.64	4	9
Independent candidates	1,055	6.18	1				1
South African Political Alliance	528	3.09	0	435	2.56	1	1
African Christian Democratic Party	396	2.32	0	423	2.49	0	0
Total	17,080	100.00	10	17,000	100.00	10	20
Valid votes	17,080	98.14		17,000	97.68		
Invalid/blank votes	324	1.86		403	2.32		
Total votes	17,404	100.00		17,403	100.00		
Registered voters/turnout	29,863	58.28		29,863	58.28		

=== October 2002 floor crossing ===
In terms of the Eighth Amendment of the Constitution and the judgment of the Constitutional Court in United Democratic Movement v President of the Republic of South Africa and Others, in the period from 8–22 October 2002 councillors had the opportunity to cross the floor to a different political party without losing their seats. In the Saldanha Bay council the Democratic Alliance (DA) lost two councillors to the New National Party (NNP), which had formerly been part of the DA.

Party	Seats before	Net change	Seats after
African National Congress	9	0	9
Democratic Alliance	9	▼2	7
New National Party	–	▲2	2
South African Political Alliance	1	0	1
Independent	1	0	1

=== September 2004 floor crossing ===
Another floor-crossing period occurred on 1–15 September 2004. The independent councillor joined the United Democratic Movement.

Party	Seats before	Net change	Seats after
African National Congress	9	0	9
Democratic Alliance	7	0	7
New National Party	2	0	2
South African Political Alliance	1	0	1
United Democratic Movement	–	▲1	1
Independent	1	▼1	0

== March 2006 election ==
The following table shows the results of the 2006 election.

Party	Ward			List			Total seats
Party	Votes	%	Seats	Votes	%	Seats	Total seats
African National Congress	7,713	37.43	6	8,089	40.16	3	9
Democratic Alliance	5,584	27.10	4	5,818	28.89	2	6
Independent Democrats	2,741	13.30	0	3,298	16.37	3	3
South African Political Alliance	1,135	5.51	0	1,094	5.43	1	1
United Independent Front	940	4.56	0	913	4.53	1	1
Independent candidates	1,764	8.56	2				2
African Christian Democratic Party	411	1.99	0	483	2.40	1	1
United Democratic Movement	316	1.53	0	446	2.21	0	0
Total	20,604	100.00	12	20,141	100.00	11	23
Valid votes	20,604	98.60		20,141	96.47		
Invalid/blank votes	292	1.40		736	3.53		
Total votes	20,896	100.00		20,877	100.00		
Registered voters/turnout	38,131	54.80		38,131	54.75		

=== By-elections from March 2006 to August 2007 ===
The following by-elections were held to fill vacant ward seats in the period between the election in March 2006 and the floor crossing period in September 2007.

Date	Ward	Party of the previous councillor	Party of the newly elected councillor
23 May 2007	7	African National Congress	Independent (Note: The former councillor was re-elected to the ward as an independent.)

=== September 2007 floor crossing ===
The final floor-crossing period occurred on 1–15 September 2007; floor-crossing was subsequently abolished in 2008 by the Fifteenth Amendment of the Constitution. In the Saldanha Bay council, two of the independent councillors joined the African National Congress, and the single councillor from the United Independent Front crossed to the National People's Party.

Party	Seats before	Net change	Seats after
African National Congress	8	▲2	10
Democratic Alliance	6	0	6
Independent Democrats	3	0	3
Independent	3	▼2	1
South African Political Alliance	1	0	1
African Christian Democratic Party	1	0	1
National People's Party	—	▲1	1
United Independent Front	1	▼1	0

== May 2011 election ==
The following table shows the results of the 2011 election.

Party	Ward			List			Total seats
Party	Votes	%	Seats	Votes	%	Seats	Total seats
Democratic Alliance	15,937	54.14	9	17,270	60.49	6	15
African National Congress	8,479	28.80	3	9,271	32.47	5	8
Independent candidates	3,109	10.56	1				1
Congress of the People	341	1.16	0	397	1.39	1	1
Service to Our People's Party	397	1.35	0	330	1.16	0	0
African Christian Democratic Party	228	0.77	0	236	0.83	0	0
Liberal People's Party	227	0.77	0	208	0.73	0	0
Local Government Party	233	0.79	0	198	0.69	0	0
The Peoples Independent Civic Organisation	172	0.58	0	171	0.60	0	0
United Democratic Movement	74	0.25	0	178	0.62	0	0
South African Political Alliance	110	0.37	0	79	0.28	0	0
National People's Party	70	0.24	0	81	0.28	0	0
South African Progressive Civic Organisation	59	0.20	0	75	0.26	0	0
Cape Party				57	0.20	0	0
Total	29,436	100.00	13	28,551	100.00	12	25
Valid votes	29,436	98.51		28,551	95.42		
Invalid/blank votes	445	1.49		1,371	4.58		
Total votes	29,881	100.00		29,922	100.00		
Registered voters/turnout	47,173	63.34		47,173	63.43		

=== By-elections from May 2011 to August 2016 ===
The following by-elections were held to fill vacant ward seats in the period between the elections in May 2011 and August 2016.

Date	Ward	Party of the previous councillor	Party of the newly elected councillor
28 March 2012	12	African National Congress	African National Congress
19 February 2014	9	Independent	African National Congress

== August 2016 election ==
The following table shows the results of the 2016 election.

Party	Ward			List			Total seats
Party	Votes	%	Seats	Votes	%	Seats	Total seats
Democratic Alliance	21,207	60.00	11	21,661	62.32	6	17
African National Congress	10,306	29.16	3	10,361	29.81	5	8
Economic Freedom Fighters	693	1.96	0	701	2.02	1	1
Saldanha Bay Residents Alliance	634	1.79	0	499	1.44	1	1
Khoisan Revolution	483	1.37	0	525	1.51	0	0
Independent candidates	988	2.80	0				0
Freedom Front Plus	327	0.93	0	309	0.89	0	0
African Christian Democratic Party	213	0.60	0	238	0.68	0	0
National Democratic Party	210	0.59	0	133	0.38	0	0
Service to Our People's Party	142	0.40	0	144	0.41	0	0
Ubuntu Party	73	0.21	0	68	0.20	0	0
Cape Party	30	0.08	0	38	0.11	0	0
United Democratic Movement				58	0.17	0	0
Nationalist Coloured Party	37	0.10	0				0
The Peoples Independent Civic Organisation				23	0.07	0	0
Total	35,343	100.00	14	34,758	100.00	13	27
Valid votes	35,343	97.76		34,758	97.57		
Invalid/blank votes	809	2.24		866	2.43		
Total votes	36,152	100.00		35,624	100.00		
Registered voters/turnout	56,767	63.68		56,767	62.75		

=== By-elections from August 2016 to November 2021 ===
The following by-elections were held to fill vacant ward seats in the period between the elections in August 2016 and November 2021.

Date	Ward	Party of the previous councillor	Party of the newly elected councillor
30 May 2018	3	Democratic Alliance	Democratic Alliance
12 December 2018	5	Democratic Alliance	Democratic Alliance
18 September 2019	14	Democratic Alliance	Democratic Alliance
11 November 2020 (Note: By-election was delayed due to the COVID-19 pandemic.)	13	Democratic Alliance	Democratic Alliance

== November 2021 election ==
The following table shows the results of the 2021 election.

Party	Ward			List			Total seats
Party	Votes	%	Seats	Votes	%	Seats	Total seats
Democratic Alliance	14,190	45.63	10	14,524	47.05	3	13
African National Congress	6,613	21.27	4	6,809	22.06	2	6
Good	4,329	13.92	0	4,230	13.70	4	4
Freedom Front Plus	1,546	4.97	0	1,334	4.32	1	1
Patriotic Alliance	1,365	4.39	0	1,309	4.24	1	1
Economic Freedom Fighters	933	3.00	0	988	3.20	1	1
Cape Coloured Congress	436	1.40	0	441	1.43	1	1
Socialist Revolutionary Workers Party	415	1.33	0	458	1.48	0	0
African Christian Democratic Party	418	1.34	0	389	1.26	0	0
Cape Independence Party	220	0.71	0	230	0.75	0	0
Independent candidates	424	1.36	0				0
Conservative Party	123	0.40	0	82	0.27	0	0
Africa Restoration Alliance	61	0.20	0	52	0.17	0	0
Spectrum National Party	22	0.07	0	25	0.08	0	0
Total	31,095	100.00	14	30,871	100.00	13	27
Valid votes	31,095	99.18		30,871	98.46		
Invalid/blank votes	257	0.82		483	1.54		
Total votes	31,352	100.00		31,354	100.00		
Registered voters/turnout	61,441	51.03		61,441	51.03		
Source: Electoral Commission

Following the election, the Democratic Alliance (DA) formed a coalition with the Freedom Front Plus (FF+).

=== By-elections from November 2021 ===
The following by-elections were held to fill vacant ward seats in the period from the election in November 2021.

Date	Ward	Party of the previous councillor	Party of the newly elected councillor
6 Dec 2023	9	African National Congress	Economic Freedom Fighters
19 Mar 2025	1	African National Congress	uMkhonto weSizwe
22 Apr 2026	5	Democratic Alliance	Democratic Alliance
22 Apr 2026	6	Democratic Alliance	Democratic Alliance

The African National Congress (ANC) councillor for ward 9 was assassinated, leading to a by-election in December 2023. Only two parties stood, the ANC and the Economic Freedom Fighters (EFF). The EFF claimed victory after the ANC's share of the vote dropped 72% to 43%, while the EFF's increased from 15% to 57%.

Following the ANC councillor's death in ward one, uMkhonto weSizwe won the resulting by-election in March 2025, the party's first councillor in the Western Cape, and fourth nationally.

== November 2026 election ==
The following table shows the results of the 2026 election.

Party	Ward			List			Total seats
Party	Votes	%	Seats	Votes	%	Seats	Total seats
Democratic Alliance	20,356	48.68	9	20,785	49.54	6	15
Patriotic Alliance	7,945	19.00	3	8,286	19.75	3	6
African National Congress	5,046	12.07	3	5,042	12.02	1	4
Freedom Front Plus	2,345	5.61	0	2,508	5.98	2	2
South African Communist Party	1,565	3.74	0	1,520	3.62	1	1
Good	1,103	2.64	1	1,062	2.53	0	1
uMkhonto weSizwe Party	870	2.08	0	929	2.21	1	1
Economic Freedom Fighters	744	1.78	0	756	1.80	1	1
Saldanha Bay Residents Alliance	428	1.02	0	180	0.43	0	0
Independent candidates	437	1.05	0				0
People's Movement for Change	205	0.49	0	178	0.42	0	0
African Transformation Movement	145	0.35	0	199	0.47	0	0
New Democratic Party	145	0.35	0	117	0.28	0	0
Pan Africanist Congress of Azania	170	0.41	0	87	0.21	0	0
National Coloured Congress	119	0.28	0	132	0.31	0	0
Cape Independence Party	114	0.27	0	104	0.25	0	0
Service to Our People's Party	48	0.11	0	35	0.08	0	0
Afrika Mayibuye Movement	19	0.05	0	25	0.06	0	0
Spectrum National Party	13	0.03	0	11	0.03	0	0
Total	41,817	100.00	16	41,956	100.00	15	31
Valid votes	41,817	99.33		41,956	99.27		
Invalid/blank votes	280	0.67		310	0.73		
Total votes	42,097	100.00		42,266	100.00		
Registered voters/turnout	76,103	55.32		76,103	55.54		
