= Cederberg Local Municipality elections =

Municipal elections in South Africa

The Cederberg Local Municipality consists of eleven members elected by mixed-member proportional representation. Six councillors are elected by first-past-the-post voting in six wards, while the remaining five are chosen from party lists so that the total number of party representatives is proportional to the number of votes received.

In the election of 4 November 2026, no party won a majority. The Democratic Alliance won the largest number of seats.

== Results ==
The following table shows the composition of the council after past elections.

Event	ANC	CFRA	DA	PA	Other	Total
2000 election	6	—	5	—	1	12
2002 floor-crossing	6	—	4	—	2	12
2006 election	6	—	4	—	2	12
2008 by-elections	2	—	7	—	3	12
2011 election	5	—	4	—	2	11
2016 election	4	—	6	—	1	11
2018-19 by-elections	6	—	4	—	1	11
2021 election	4	3	2	1	1	11
2026 election	3	2	4	2	0	11

== December 2000 election ==
The following table shows the results of the 2000 election.

Party	Ward			List			Total seats
Party	Votes	%	Seats	Votes	%	Seats	Total seats
African National Congress	4,793	47.90	3	4,789	47.93	3	6
Democratic Alliance	4,450	44.47	3	4,531	45.35	2	5
United Democratic Movement	707	7.07	0	671	6.72	1	1
Independent candidates	57	0.57	0				0
Total	10,007	100.00	6	9,991	100.00	6	12
Valid votes	10,007	98.42		9,991	98.26		
Invalid/blank votes	161	1.58		177	1.74		
Total votes	10,168	100.00		10,168	100.00		
Registered voters/turnout	14,919	68.15		14,919	68.15		

=== By-elections from December 2000 to October 2002 ===
The following by-elections were held to fill vacant ward seats in the period between the election in December 2000 and the floor crossing period in October 2002.

Date	Ward	Party of the previous councillor	Party of the newly elected councillor
24 July 2002	6	African National Congress	African National Congress

=== October 2002 floor crossing ===
In terms of the Eighth Amendment of the Constitution and the judgment of the Constitutional Court in United Democratic Movement v President of the Republic of South Africa and Others, in the period from 8–22 October 2002 councillors had the opportunity to cross the floor to a different political party without losing their seats. In the Cederberg council the Democratic Alliance (DA) lost two councillors to the New National Party (NNP), which had formerly been part of the DA. The single councillor from the United Democratic Movement crossed to the DA.

Party	Seats before	Net change	Seats after
African National Congress	6	0	6
Democratic Alliance	5	▼1	4
New National Party	–	▲2	2
United Democratic Movement	1	▼1	0

== March 2006 election ==
The following table shows the results of the 2006 election.

Party	Ward			List			Total seats
Party	Votes	%	Seats	Votes	%	Seats	Total seats
African National Congress	4,514	46.44	5	4,536	46.59	1	6
Democratic Alliance	3,633	37.38	1	3,675	37.74	3	4
Independent Democrats	1,564	16.09	0	1,526	15.67	2	2
United Independent Front	9	0.09	0				0
Total	9,720	100.00	6	9,737	100.00	6	12
Valid votes	9,720	98.42		9,737	98.37		
Invalid/blank votes	156	1.58		161	1.63		
Total votes	9,876	100.00		9,898	100.00		
Registered voters/turnout	18,051	54.71		18,051	54.83		

=== By-elections from March 2006 to May 2011 ===
The following by-elections were held to fill vacant ward seats in the period between the elections in March 2006 and May 2011.

Date	Ward	Party of the previous councillor	Party of the newly elected councillor
10 December 2008	2	African National Congress	Democratic Alliance
10 December 2008	3	African National Congress	Independent Democrats
10 December 2008	4	African National Congress	Democratic Alliance
10 December 2008	5	African National Congress	Democratic Alliance

== May 2011 election ==
The following table shows the results of the 2011 election.

Party	Ward			List			Total seats
Party	Votes	%	Seats	Votes	%	Seats	Total seats
African National Congress	5,641	43.67	4	5,869	46.39	1	5
Democratic Alliance	4,801	37.17	2	4,879	38.56	2	4
Congress of the People	1,232	9.54	0	1,204	9.52	1	1
Pan Africanist Congress of Azania	674	5.22	0	635	5.02	1	1
Independent candidates	510	3.95	0				0
The Peoples Independent Civic Organisation	60	0.46	0	65	0.51	0	0
Total	12,918	100.00	6	12,652	100.00	5	11
Valid votes	12,918	98.99		12,652	97.04		
Invalid/blank votes	132	1.01		386	2.96		
Total votes	13,050	100.00		13,038	100.00		
Registered voters/turnout	21,058	61.97		21,058	61.91		

=== By-elections from May 2011 to August 2016 ===
The following by-elections were held to fill vacant ward seats in the period between the elections in May 2011 and August 2016.

Date	Ward	Party of the previous councillor	Party of the newly elected councillor
7 September 2011	6	Democratic Alliance	African National Congress (Note: The former councillor was re-elected to the ward on behalf of a different party.)
9 November 2011	4	Democratic Alliance	Democratic Alliance

== August 2016 election ==
The following table shows the results of the 2016 election.

Party	Ward			List			Total seats
Party	Votes	%	Seats	Votes	%	Seats	Total seats
Democratic Alliance	8,440	55.06	6	8,455	55.36	0	6
African National Congress	5,507	35.93	0	5,483	35.90	4	4
Alliance of Democratic Congress	912	5.95	0	867	5.68	1	1
Alliance for Democratic Freedom	221	1.44	0	225	1.47	0	0
Economic Freedom Fighters	123	0.80	0	135	0.88	0	0
Coloured Voice	52	0.34	0	56	0.37	0	0
Democratic New Civic Association	27	0.18	0	32	0.21	0	0
South African Progressive Civic Organisation	38	0.25	0				0
The Peoples Independent Civic Organisation	3	0.02	0	20	0.13	0	0
Independent candidates	6	0.04	0				0
Total	15,329	100.00	6	15,273	100.00	5	11
Valid votes	15,329	98.99		15,273	98.66		
Invalid/blank votes	157	1.01		207	1.34		
Total votes	15,486	100.00		15,480	100.00		
Registered voters/turnout	24,931	62.12		24,931	62.09		

The DA subsequently lost two seats to the African National Congress (ANC) in by-elections held on 12 December 2018, and 18 September 2019.

Date	Ward	Party of the previous councillor	Party of the newly elected councillor
12 December 2018	4	Democratic Alliance	African National Congress
18 September 2019	3	Democratic Alliance	African National Congress

The council was reconfigured as seen below:

Party	Seats		
Party	Ward	List	Total
Democratic Alliance	4	0	4
African National Congress	2	4	6
Alliance of Democratic Congress	0	1	1
Total	6	5	11

On 26 June 2019, DA councillor Bertie Zass voted with the ANC to remove the DA-ADC coalition from power. The elected Executive Mayor was Sylvia Quinta with Mariaan Nell as the Deputy Executive Mayor. The appointed Speaker was Paul Strauss. They were all party members of the African National Congress. The ward Zass previously held automatically became vacant, because of his party defection.

On 22 July 2019, the Western Cape High Court ruled that the elections of the ANC councillors to senior municipal positions were unlawful. The court ordered the reinstatement of DA Mayor William Farmer and ADC Deputy Mayor Francina Sokuyeka. However, in the by-election held on 18 September 2019, the ANC won the vacant ward from the DA, giving the ANC a majority in the council.

== November 2021 election ==
The following table shows the results of the 2021 election.

Party	Ward			List			Total seats
Party	Votes	%	Seats	Votes	%	Seats	Total seats
African National Congress	5,228	35.27	4	5,267	35.63	0	4
Cederberg First Residents Association	4,138	27.92	1	4,003	27.08	2	3
Democratic Alliance	3,022	20.39	1	3,113	21.06	1	2
Patriotic Alliance	1,161	7.83	0	1,137	7.69	1	1
Freedom Front Plus	475	3.20	0	459	3.11	1	1
African Christian Democratic Party	179	1.21	0	178	1.20	0	0
Economic Freedom Fighters	169	1.14	0	169	1.14	0	0
Good	130	0.88	0	166	1.12	0	0
Africa Restoration Alliance	91	0.61	0	103	0.70	0	0
Democratic Independent Party	95	0.64	0	94	0.64	0	0
Democratic New Civic Association	59	0.40	0	69	0.47	0	0
Independent candidates	60	0.40	0				0
The Organic Humanity Movement	14	0.09	0	24	0.16	0	0
Total	14,821	100.00	6	14,782	100.00	5	11
Valid votes	14,821	99.46		14,782	99.24		
Invalid/blank votes	80	0.54		113	0.76		
Total votes	14,901	100.00		14,895	100.00		
Registered voters/turnout	27,147	54.89		27,147	54.87		

=== By-elections from November 2021 ===
The following by-elections were held to fill vacant ward seats in the period since the election in November 2021.

Date	Ward	Party of the previous councillor	Party of the newly elected councillor
13 Oct 2022	5	Democratic Alliance	Democratic Alliance
15 Feb 2023	6	Cederberg First Residents Association	Cederberg First Residents Association
24 Apr 2024	3	African National Congress	Cederberg First Residents Association
28 Aug 2024	2	African National Congress	Democratic Alliance
3 Feb 2026	4	African National Congress	Democratic Alliance

After the 2021 election, Cederberg First (or Cederberg Eerste, CE) (3), the DA (2) and Freedom Front Plus (FF+) (1) formed a coalition. A motion of no-confidence in CE mayor Ruben Richards, after he was accused of corruption, was later passed with the support of one DA councillor, the speaker William Farmer. Farmer was then elected mayor with the support of the ANC and PA. Farmer was subsequently expelled from the DA, and joined the Patriotic Alliance (PA), standing as their candidate during the october 2022 by-election. The new DA candidate increased the party's share of the vote, retaining the seat for the DA, and restoring the previous CE, DA and FF+ coalition government.

Subsequently, CE formed a coalition with the ANC. A by-election was held in February 2026 after an ANC councillor defected to the DA, with him holding his seat for his new party. This was the second ward claimed by the DA from the ANC, and resulted in the ANC/CE coalition losing its majority.

== November 2026 election ==
The following table shows the results of the 2026 election.

Party	Ward			List			Total seats
Party	Votes	%	Seats	Votes	%	Seats	Total seats
Democratic Alliance	4,536	30.61	3	4,587	31.40	1	4
African National Congress	3,282	22.15	1	3,306	22.63	2	3
Patriotic Alliance	2,299	15.51	0	2,386	16.34	2	2
Cederberg First Residents Association	2,233	15.07	2	2,172	14.87	0	2
Freedom Front Plus	559	3.77	0	605	4.14	0	0
National Coloured Congress	529	3.57	0	498	3.41	0	0
Alliance of Citizens for Change	442	2.98	0	451	3.09	0	0
South African Communist Party	383	2.58	0	373	2.55	0	0
Independent candidates	292	1.97	0				0
Economic Freedom Fighters	107	0.72	0	109	0.75	0	0
People's Movement for Change	45	0.30	0	35	0.24	0	0
Cape Independence Party	55	0.37	0	24	0.16	0	0
Spectrum National Party	40	0.27	0	36	0.25	0	0
African Transformation Movement	8	0.05	0	19	0.13	0	0
Afrika Mayibuye Movement	9	0.06	0	5	0.03	0	0
Total	14,819	100.00	6	14,606	100.00	5	11
Valid votes	14,819	99.14		14,606	98.78		
Invalid/blank votes	128	0.86		180	1.22		
Total votes	14,947	100.00		14,786	100.00		
Registered voters/turnout	29,719	50.29		29,719	49.75		
