= Swartland Local Municipality elections =

Municipal elections in South Africa

The Swartland Local Municipality consists of twenty-three members elected by mixed-member proportional representation. Twelve councillors are elected by first-past-the-post voting in twelve wards, while the remaining eleven are chosen from party lists so that the total number of party representatives is proportional to the number of votes received.

In the election of 4 November 2026 the Democratic Alliance (DA) obtained a majority of fourteen seats on the council.

== Results ==
The following table shows the composition of the council after past elections.

Event	ACDP	ANC	DA	EFF	FF+	Other	Total
2000 election	1	6	11	—	—	1	19
2002 floor crossing	1	7	11	—	—	1	19
2006 election	1	6	12	—	—	1	20
2011 election	0	6	15	—	—	2	23
2016 election	—	6	16	1	—	0	23
2021 election	0	5	14	1	2	1	23
2026 election	—	3	14	0	2	4	23

== December 2000 election ==
The following table shows the results of the 2000 election.

Party	Ward			List			Total seats
Party	Votes	%	Seats	Votes	%	Seats	Total seats
Democratic Alliance	9,896	56.33	8	10,194	58.09	3	11
African National Congress	5,806	33.05	2	5,919	33.73	4	6
Verenigde Gemeenskap Organisasie	760	4.33	0	648	3.69	1	1
African Christian Democratic Party	626	3.56	0	521	2.97	1	1
Abbotsdale Community Development Forum	194	1.10	0	268	1.53	0	0
Independent candidates	214	1.22	0				0
United Democratic Movement	71	0.40	0				0
Total	17,567	100.00	10	17,550	100.00	9	19
Valid votes	17,567	98.54		17,550	98.45		
Invalid/blank votes	260	1.46		276	1.55		
Total votes	17,827	100.00		17,826	100.00		
Registered voters/turnout	28,270	63.06		28,270	63.06		

=== October 2002 floor crossing ===
In terms of the Eighth Amendment of the Constitution and the judgment of the Constitutional Court in United Democratic Movement v President of the Republic of South Africa and Others, in the period from 8–22 October 2002 councillors had the opportunity to cross the floor to a different political party without losing their seats. In the Drakenstein council, the single councillor of the Verenigde Gemeenskap Organisasie crossed to the African National Congress.

Party	Seats before	Net change	Seats after
Democratic Alliance	11	0	11
African National Congress	6	▲1	7
African Christian Democratic Party	1	0	1
Verenigde Gemeenskap Organisasie	1	▼1	0

=== By-elections from October 2002 to August 2004 ===
The following by-elections were held to fill vacant ward seats in the period between the floor crossing periods in October 2002 and September 2004.

Date	Ward	Party of the previous councillor	Party of the newly elected councillor
17 September 2003	10	Democratic Alliance	Democratic Alliance

== March 2006 election ==
The following table shows the results of the 2006 election.

Party	Ward			List			Total seats
Party	Votes	%	Seats	Votes	%	Seats	Total seats
Democratic Alliance	10,711	58.29	9	10,666	58.16	3	12
African National Congress	5,597	30.46	1	5,553	30.28	5	6
Independent Democrats	1,144	6.23	0	1,145	6.24	1	1
African Christian Democratic Party	291	1.58	0	448	2.44	1	1
Freedom Front Plus	323	1.76	0	268	1.46	0	0
Independent candidates	252	1.37	0				0
United Democratic Movement	46	0.25	0	183	1.00	0	0
Pan Africanist Congress of Azania	10	0.05	0	77	0.42	0	0
Total	18,374	100.00	10	18,340	100.00	10	20
Valid votes	18,374	98.44		18,340	98.25		
Invalid/blank votes	291	1.56		326	1.75		
Total votes	18,665	100.00		18,666	100.00		
Registered voters/turnout	34,954	53.40		34,954	53.40		

=== By-elections from March 2006 to May 2011 ===
The following by-elections were held to fill vacant ward seats in the period between period between the elections in March 2006 and May 2011.

Date	Ward	Party of the previous councillor	Party of the newly elected councillor
14 October 2009	2	Democratic Alliance	Democratic Alliance
18 November 2009	3	Democratic Alliance	Democratic Alliance

== May 2011 election ==
The following table shows the results of the 2011 election.

Party	Ward			List			Total seats
Party	Votes	%	Seats	Votes	%	Seats	Total seats
Democratic Alliance	16,146	64.17	11	16,212	64.31	4	15
African National Congress	6,978	27.73	1	7,078	28.08	5	6
Congress of the People	1,055	4.19	0	1,062	4.21	1	1
The Peoples Independent Civic Organisation	494	1.96	0	461	1.83	1	1
African Christian Democratic Party	333	1.32	0	261	1.04	0	0
Freedom Front Plus	156	0.62	0	137	0.54	0	0
Total	25,162	100.00	12	25,211	100.00	11	23
Valid votes	25,162	98.93		25,211	99.11		
Invalid/blank votes	272	1.07		227	0.89		
Total votes	25,434	100.00		25,438	100.00		
Registered voters/turnout	42,249	60.20		42,249	60.21		

=== By-elections from May 2011 to August 2016 ===
The following by-elections were held to fill vacant ward seats in the period between the elections in May 2011 and August 2016.

Date	Ward	Party of the previous councillor	Party of the newly elected councillor
1 August 2012	6	Democratic Alliance	Democratic Alliance
13 August 2014	10	Democratic Alliance	Democratic Alliance

== August 2016 election ==
The following table shows the results of the 2016 election.

Party	Ward			List			Total seats
Party	Votes	%	Seats	Votes	%	Seats	Total seats
Democratic Alliance	19,969	69.45	11	20,412	71.35	5	16
African National Congress	6,724	23.38	1	6,964	24.34	5	6
Economic Freedom Fighters	765	2.66	0	789	2.76	1	1
Cape Party	374	1.30	0	302	1.06	0	0
Independent candidates	554	1.93	0				0
Nationalist Coloured Party of South Africa	294	1.02	0				0
South African Progressive Civic Organisation	75	0.26	0	140	0.49	0	0
Total	28,755	100.00	12	28,607	100.00	11	23
Valid votes	28,755	99.02		28,607	98.54		
Invalid/blank votes	284	0.98		424	1.46		
Total votes	29,039	100.00		29,031	100.00		
Registered voters/turnout	49,185	59.04		49,185	59.02		

The local council sends four representatives to the council of the West Coast District Municipality: three from the Democratic Alliance and one from the African National Congress.

== November 2021 election ==
The following table shows the results of the 2021 election.

Party	Ward			List			Total seats
Party	Votes	%	Seats	Votes	%	Seats	Total seats
Democratic Alliance	13,649	58.27	11	14,260	61.26	3	14
African National Congress	4,426	18.89	1	4,388	18.85	4	5
Freedom Front Plus	1,814	7.74	0	1,872	8.04	2	2
Good	1,125	4.80	0	1,255	5.39	1	1
Independent candidates	1,052	4.49	0				0
Economic Freedom Fighters	475	2.03	0	495	2.13	1	1
African Christian Democratic Party	281	1.20	0	285	1.22	0	0
Patriotic Alliance	173	0.74	0	233	1.00	0	0
Cape Independence Party	173	0.74	0	229	0.98	0	0
Africa Restoration Alliance	86	0.37	0	87	0.37	0	0
Congress of the People	56	0.24	0	77	0.33	0	0
Al Jama-ah	30	0.13	0	48	0.21	0	0
National Freedom Party	22	0.09	0	50	0.21	0	0
Cape Coloured Congress	53	0.23	0				0
Khoi-San Kingdom of RSA	10	0.04	0				0
Total	23,425	100.00	12	23,279	100.00	11	23
Valid votes	23,425	98.89		23,279	98.67		
Invalid/blank votes	262	1.11		313	1.33		
Total votes	23,687	100.00		23,592	100.00		
Registered voters/turnout	49,771	47.59		49,771	47.40		

=== By-elections from November 2021 ===
The following by-elections were held to fill vacant ward seats in the period since November 2021.

Date	Ward	Party of the previous councillor	Party of the newly elected councillor
8 Nov 2023	7	Democratic Alliance	Democratic Alliance
24 Apr 2024	11	Democratic Alliance	Patriotic Alliance
10 Jun 2026	11	Patriotic Alliance	Patriotic Alliance

== November 2026 election ==
The following table shows the results of the 2026 election.

Party	Ward			List			Total seats
Party	Votes	%	Seats	Votes	%	Seats	Total seats
Democratic Alliance	18,285	60.23	10	18,739	61.23	4	14
Patriotic Alliance	4,909	16.17	1	4,659	15.22	3	4
African National Congress	3,489	11.49	1	3,481	11.37	2	3
Freedom Front Plus	2,068	6.81	0	2,167	7.08	2	2
Economic Freedom Fighters	473	1.56	0	472	1.54	0	0
South African Communist Party	312	1.03	0	285	0.93	0	0
National Coloured Congress	210	0.69	0	201	0.66	0	0
Good	212	0.70	0	189	0.62	0	0
African Transformation Movement	107	0.35	0	135	0.44	0	0
People's Movement for Change	83	0.27	0	107	0.35	0	0
Cape Independence Party	90	0.30	0	65	0.21	0	0
Afrika Mayibuye Movement	26	0.09	0	41	0.13	0	0
uMkhonto weSizwe Party				62	0.20	0	0
Independent candidates	57	0.19	0				0
United Independent Movement	40	0.13	0				0
Total	30,361	100.00	12	30,603	100.00	11	23
Valid votes	30,361	99.29		30,603	99.31		
Invalid/blank votes	216	0.71		214	0.69		
Total votes	30,577	100.00		30,817	100.00		
Registered voters/turnout	58,703	52.09		58,703	52.50		
