= Matzikama Local Municipality elections =

The council of the Matzikama Local Municipality in the Western Cape, South Africa is elected every five years by a system of mixed-member proportional representation. Eight councillors are elected by first-past-the-post voting in eight wards, while the remaining seven are chosen from party lists so that the total number of party representatives is proportional to the number of votes received.

In the election of 4 November 2026 the Democratic Alliance (DA) won a plurality of six seats on the council.

== Results ==
The following table shows the composition of the council after past elections.

Event	ANC	DA	EFF	FF+	ID	PA	Other	Total
2000 election	7	6	—	—	—	—	0	13
2006 election	6	3	—	0	4	—	0	13
2011 election	6	7	—	—	—	—	2	15
2016 election	5	8	1	0	—	—	1	15
2021 election	4	6	1	1	—	1	2	15
2026 election	3	6	1	1	—	4	0	15

== December 2000 election ==
The following table shows the results of the 2000 election.

Party	Ward			List			Total seats
Party	Votes	%	Seats	Votes	%	Seats	Total seats
African National Congress	5,596	48.51	4	5,746	50.55	3	7
Democratic Alliance	5,220	45.25	3	5,620	49.45	3	6
Independent candidates	719	6.23	0				0
Total	11,535	100.00	7	11,366	100.00	6	13
Valid votes	11,535	97.68		11,366	96.22		
Invalid/blank votes	274	2.32		446	3.78		
Total votes	11,809	100.00		11,812	100.00		
Registered voters/turnout	17,941	65.82		17,941	65.84		

=== October 2002 floor crossing ===
In terms of the Eighth Amendment of the Constitution and the judgment of the Constitutional Court in United Democratic Movement v President of the Republic of South Africa and Others, in the period from 8–22 October 2002 councillors had the opportunity to cross the floor to a different political party without losing their seats. In the Matzikama council, four councillors from the Democratic Alliance (DA) crossed to the New National Party (NNP), which had formerly been part of the DA.

Party	Seats before	Net change	Seats after
African National Congress	7	0	7
New National Party	–	▲4	4
Democratic Alliance	6	▼4	2

=== September 2004 floor crossing ===
Another floor-crossing period occurred on 1–15 September 2004, in which one of the NNP councillors crossed to the ANC.

Party	Seats before	Net change	Seats after
African National Congress	7	▲1	8
New National Party	4	▼1	3
Democratic Alliance	2	0	2

== March 2006 election ==
The following table shows the results of the 2006 election.

Party	Ward			List			Total seats
Party	Votes	%	Seats	Votes	%	Seats	Total seats
African National Congress	5,751	43.80	5	5,782	44.14	1	6
Independent Democrats	3,582	27.28	2	3,633	27.73	2	4
Democratic Alliance	2,913	22.19	0	3,269	24.96	3	3
Independent candidates	576	4.39	0				0
African Christian Democratic Party	166	1.26	0	180	1.37	0	0
Freedom Front Plus	118	0.90	0	159	1.21	0	0
United Party of South Africa	23	0.18	0	76	0.58	0	0
Total	13,129	100.00	7	13,099	100.00	6	13
Valid votes	13,129	98.77		13,099	98.46		
Invalid/blank votes	164	1.23		205	1.54		
Total votes	13,293	100.00		13,304	100.00		
Registered voters/turnout	22,074	60.22		22,074	60.27		

=== September 2007 floor crossing ===
The final floor-crossing period occurred on 1–15 September 2007; floor-crossing was subsequently abolished in 2008 by the Fifteenth Amendment of the Constitution. In the Matzikama council one councillor crossed from the Democratic Alliance to the South African Political Alliance.

Party	Seats before	Net change	Seats after
African National Congress	6	0	6
Independent Democrats	4	0	4
Democratic Alliance	3	▼1	2
South African Political Alliance	—	▲1	1

=== By-elections from September 2007 to May 2011 ===
The following by-elections were held to fill vacant ward seats in the period between the floor crossing period in September 2007 and the election in May 2011.

Date	Ward	Party of the previous councillor	Party of the newly elected councillor
10 December 2008	2	African National Congress	Independent Democrats

== May 2011 election ==
At the election of 18 May 2011, the council was expanded to 15 members with the addition of one new ward and one new PR list seats. The Democratic Alliance won 7 seats, one short of a majority.

The following table shows the results of the 2011 election.

Party	Ward			List			Total seats
Party	Votes	%	Seats	Votes	%	Seats	Total seats
Democratic Alliance	7,648	47.18	5	7,754	47.84	2	7
African National Congress	6,455	39.82	3	6,560	40.47	3	6
New Generation Party	965	5.95	0	912	5.63	1	1
The Peoples Independent Civic Organisation	412	2.54	0	461	2.84	1	1
Congress of the People	334	2.06	0	245	1.51	0	0
African Christian Democratic Party	219	1.35	0	205	1.26	0	0
South African Political Alliance	93	0.57	0	45	0.28	0	0
Independent candidates	57	0.35	0				0
Western Cape Community	27	0.17	0	26	0.16	0	0
Total	16,210	100.00	8	16,208	100.00	7	15
Valid votes	16,210	98.88		16,208	98.93		
Invalid/blank votes	184	1.12		176	1.07		
Total votes	16,394	100.00		16,384	100.00		
Registered voters/turnout	26,630	61.56		26,630	61.52		

=== By-elections from May 2011 to August 2016 ===
The following by-elections were held to fill vacant ward seats in the period between the elections in May 2011 and August 2016.

Date	Ward	Party of the previous councillor	Party of the newly elected councillor
7 November 2012	2	Democratic Alliance	African National Congress (Note: The former councillor was re-elected to the ward on behalf of a different party.)
29 January 2014	4	Democratic Alliance	African National Congress
28 May 2024	6	Democratic Alliance	Democratic Alliance
22 July 2015	2	African National Congress	African National Congress

== August 2016 election ==
The following table shows the results of the 2016 election.

Party	Ward			List			Total seats
Party	Votes	%	Seats	Votes	%	Seats	Total seats
Democratic Alliance	9,833	54.69	7	9,782	54.64	1	8
African National Congress	6,114	34.01	1	6,212	34.70	4	5
United Democrats	587	3.26	0	559	3.12	1	1
Economic Freedom Fighters	505	2.81	0	514	2.87	1	1
Patriotic Alliance	390	2.17	0	388	2.17	0	0
New Generation Party	297	1.65	0	197	1.10	0	0
Freedom Front Plus	184	1.02	0	184	1.03	0	0
The Peoples Independent Civic Organisation	69	0.38	0	67	0.37	0	0
Total	17,979	100.00	8	17,903	100.00	7	15
Valid votes	17,979	99.35		17,903	99.32		
Invalid/blank votes	117	0.65		122	0.68		
Total votes	18,096	100.00		18,025	100.00		
Registered voters/turnout	30,193	59.93		30,193	59.70		

=== By-elections from August 2016 to 2021 ===
The following by-elections were held to fill vacant ward seats in the period between the elections since August 2016.

Date	Ward	Party of the previous councillor	Party of the newly elected councillor
12 December 2018	6	Democratic Alliance	African National Congress
13 November 2019	4	Democratic Alliance	African National Congress
26 February 2020	8	Democratic Alliance	African National Congress

In July 2018, the ANC's Hennie Nel was elected mayor after the resignation of the DA's Rhenda Stephan. In August 2018, the DA's Johan van der Hoven was elected as mayor.

After the second by-election, the ANC became the largest party as the council was reconfigured as seen below:

Party	Seats		
Party	Ward	List	Total
African National Congress	3	4	7
Democratic Alliance	5	1	6
United Democrats	0	1	1
Economic Freedom Fighters	0	1	1
Total	8	7	15

The local council sends two representatives to the council of the West Coast District Municipality: one from the ANC and one from the DA.

== November 2021 election ==
The following table shows the results of the 2021 election.

Party	Ward			List			Total seats
Party	Votes	%	Seats	Votes	%	Seats	Total seats
Democratic Alliance	6,199	36.73	3	6,254	37.89	3	6
African National Congress	4,877	28.90	4	4,854	29.41	0	4
Patriotic Alliance	2,307	13.67	1	1,871	11.34	1	2
Good	1,324	7.84	0	1,328	8.05	1	1
Freedom Front Plus	1,303	7.72	0	1,189	7.20	1	1
Economic Freedom Fighters	645	3.82	0	627	3.80	1	1
Khoi-San Heavenly Party				269	1.63	0	0
Africa Restoration Alliance	83	0.49	0	60	0.36	0	0
United Democratic Movement	62	0.37	0	53	0.32	0	0
Independent candidates	48	0.28	0				0
Khoi-San Kingdom of RSA	30	0.18	0				0
Total	16,878	100.00	8	16,505	100.00	7	15
Valid votes	16,878	98.70		16,505	98.71		
Invalid/blank votes	223	1.30		216	1.29		
Total votes	17,101	100.00		16,721	100.00		
Registered voters/turnout	31,765	53.84		31,765	52.64		

=== By-elections from November 2021 ===
The following by-elections were held to fill vacant ward seats in the period since November 2021.

Date	Ward	Party of the previous councillor	Party of the newly elected councillor
6 Jul 2022	7	Patriotic Alliance	DA
20 Nov 2024	6	African National Congress	Patriotic Alliance
20 Aug 2025	7	Democratic Alliance	Democratic Alliance

After the November 2024 by-election, the council was reconfigured as below:

Party	Seats		
Party	Ward	List	Total
Democratic Alliance	4	3	7
African National Congress	3	0	3
Patriotic Alliance	1	1	2
Good	0	1	1
Freedom Front Plus	0	1	1
Economic Freedom Fighters	0	1	1
Total	8	7	15

== November 2026 election ==
The following table shows the results of the 2026 election.

Party	Ward			List			Total seats
Party	Votes	%	Seats	Votes	%	Seats	Total seats
Democratic Alliance	7,620	42.04	6	7,573	41.88	0	6
Patriotic Alliance	4,504	24.85	2	4,473	24.73	2	4
African National Congress	3,140	17.32	0	3,282	18.15	3	3
Freedom Front Plus	1,254	6.92	0	1,203	6.65	1	1
Economic Freedom Fighters	490	2.70	0	514	2.84	1	1
uMkhonto weSizwe Party	230	1.27	0	216	1.19	0	0
Pan Africanist Congress of Azania	169	0.93	0	137	0.76	0	0
People's Movement for Change	158	0.87	0	146	0.81	0	0
National Coloured Congress	146	0.81	0	140	0.77	0	0
African Christian Democratic Party	80	0.44	0	96	0.53	0	0
United Democrats	86	0.47	0	86	0.48	0	0
South African Communist Party	63	0.35	0	57	0.32	0	0
Afrika Mayibuye Movement	51	0.28	0	47	0.26	0	0
Good	52	0.29	0	44	0.24	0	0
African Transformation Movement	33	0.18	0	43	0.24	0	0
Cape Independence Party	24	0.13	0	12	0.07	0	0
Independent candidates	20	0.11	0				0
Khoi-San Heavenly Party	5	0.03	0	15	0.08	0	0
Total	18,125	100.00	8	18,084	100.00	7	15
Valid votes	18,125	99.09		18,084	99.01		
Invalid/blank votes	166	0.91		180	0.99		
Total votes	18,291	100.00		18,264	100.00		
Registered voters/turnout	36,342	50.33		36,342	50.26		
