= Dawid Kruiper Local Municipality elections =

The Dawid Kruiper Local Municipality council was formed in 2016 and consists of thirty-three members elected by mixed-member proportional representation. Seventeen councillors are elected by first-past-the-post voting in seventeen wards, while the remaining sixteen are chosen from party lists so that the total number of party representatives is proportional to the number of votes received. In the election of 1 November 2021 the African National Congress (ANC) won a majority of eighteen seats.

== Results ==
The following table shows the composition of the council after past elections.

Event	ANC	DA	EFF	FF+	Other	Total
2016 election	18	10	1	1	1	31
2021 election	18	12	1	1	1	33

== August 2016 election ==
The following table shows the results of the 2016 election.

Party	Ward			List			Total seats
Party	Votes	%	Seats	Votes	%	Seats	Total seats
African National Congress	21,875	58.69	14	21,916	58.78	4	18
Democratic Alliance	11,479	30.80	2	11,494	30.83	8	10
Economic Freedom Fighters	1,529	4.10	0	1,670	4.48	1	1
Congress of the People	984	2.64	0	1,064	2.85	1	1
Freedom Front Plus	495	1.33	0	480	1.29	1	1
Khoisan Revolution	277	0.74	0	426	1.14	0	0
Independent candidates	428	1.15	0				0
African Christian Democratic Party	111	0.30	0	98	0.26	0	0
Patriotic Alliance	47	0.13	0	78	0.21	0	0
Die Forum	48	0.13	0	57	0.15	0	0
Total	37,273	100.00	16	37,283	100.00	15	31
Valid votes	37,273	99.09		37,283	98.98		
Invalid/blank votes	343	0.91		383	1.02		
Total votes	37,616	100.00		37,666	100.00		
Registered voters/turnout	57,992	64.86		57,992	64.95		

== November 2021 election ==
The following table shows the results of the 2021 election.

Party	Ward			List			Total seats
Party	Votes	%	Seats	Votes	%	Seats	Total seats
African National Congress	17,470	55.52	14	17,262	54.75	4	18
Democratic Alliance	10,991	34.93	3	11,169	35.43	9	12
Khoisan Revolution	927	2.95	0	1,017	3.23	1	1
Freedom Front Plus	786	2.50	0	771	2.45	1	1
Economic Freedom Fighters	523	1.66	0	556	1.76	1	1
Congress of the People	305	0.97	0	365	1.16	0	0
Independent South African National Civic Organisation	166	0.53	0	168	0.53	0	0
African Christian Democratic Party	147	0.47	0	123	0.39	0	0
Africa Restoration Alliance	72	0.23	0	68	0.22	0	0
Patriotic Alliance	63	0.20	0				0
African Transformation Movement	15	0.05	0	28	0.09	0	0
Total	31,465	100.00	17	31,527	100.00	16	33
Valid votes	31,465	98.47		31,527	98.27		
Invalid/blank votes	490	1.53		555	1.73		
Total votes	31,955	100.00		32,082	100.00		
Registered voters/turnout	59,509	53.70		59,509	53.91		

=== By-elections from November 2021 ===
The following by-elections were held to fill vacant ward seats in the period from November 2021.

Date	Ward	Party of the previous councillor	Party of the newly elected councillor
14 May 2026	15	Democratic Alliance	Patriotic Alliance
