= Kai !Garib Local Municipality elections =

The Kai !Garib Local Municipality council consists of nineteen members elected by mixed-member proportional representation. Ten councillors are elected by first-past-the-post voting in ten wards, while the remaining nine are chosen from party lists so that the total number of party representatives is proportional to the number of votes received. In the election of 1 November 2021 the African National Congress (ANC) won a majority of ten seats.

== Results ==
The following table shows the composition of the council after past elections.

Event	ANC	DA	EFF	Other	Total
2000 election	10	5	—	0	15
2006 election	10	2	—	3	15
2011 election	10	4	—	3	17
2016 election	11	5	1	2	19
2021 election	10	3	1	5	19

== December 2000 election ==
The following table shows the results of the 2000 election.

Party	Ward			List			Total seats
Party	Votes	%	Seats	Votes	%	Seats	Total seats
African National Congress	8,007	66.16	8	8,073	66.74	2	10
Democratic Alliance	3,745	30.95	0	3,618	29.91	5	5
United Democratic Movement	164	1.36	0	173	1.43	0	0
African Christian Democratic Party	28	0.23	0	233	1.93	0	0
Independent candidates	158	1.31	0				0
Total	12,102	100.00	8	12,097	100.00	7	15
Valid votes	12,102	97.63		12,097	97.72		
Invalid/blank votes	294	2.37		282	2.28		
Total votes	12,396	100.00		12,379	100.00		
Registered voters/turnout	22,576	54.91		22,576	54.83		

== March 2006 election ==
The following table shows the results of the 2006 election.

Party	Ward			List			Total seats
Party	Votes	%	Seats	Votes	%	Seats	Total seats
African National Congress	8,638	66.84	8	8,531	66.21	2	10
Independent Democrats	2,563	19.83	0	2,617	20.31	3	3
Democratic Alliance	1,499	11.60	0	1,477	11.46	2	2
African Christian Democratic Party	223	1.73	0	260	2.02	0	0
Total	12,923	100.00	8	12,885	100.00	7	15
Valid votes	12,923	97.98		12,885	97.71		
Invalid/blank votes	266	2.02		302	2.29		
Total votes	13,189	100.00		13,187	100.00		
Registered voters/turnout	25,421	51.88		25,421	51.87		

== May 2011 election ==
The following table shows the results of the 2011 election.

Party	Ward			List			Total seats
Party	Votes	%	Seats	Votes	%	Seats	Total seats
African National Congress	9,949	58.00	8	10,023	58.23	2	10
Democratic Alliance	4,380	25.53	0	4,472	25.98	4	4
Congress of the People	2,783	16.22	1	2,718	15.79	2	3
Independent candidates	42	0.24	0				0
Total	17,154	100.00	9	17,213	100.00	8	17
Valid votes	17,154	98.44		17,213	98.65		
Invalid/blank votes	272	1.56		235	1.35		
Total votes	17,426	100.00		17,448	100.00		
Registered voters/turnout	27,649	63.03		27,649	63.11		

== August 2016 election ==
The following table shows the results of the 2016 election.

Party	Ward			List			Total seats
Party	Votes	%	Seats	Votes	%	Seats	Total seats
African National Congress	10,829	55.91	10	10,826	57.28	1	11
Democratic Alliance	4,573	23.61	0	4,669	24.70	5	5
Die Forum	1,672	8.63	0	1,678	8.88	2	2
Economic Freedom Fighters	571	2.95	0	610	3.23	1	1
Congress of the People	552	2.85	0	531	2.81	0	0
Freedom Front Plus	467	2.41	0	392	2.07	0	0
Independent candidates	596	3.08	0				0
Khoisan Revolution	67	0.35	0	135	0.71	0	0
Patriotic Alliance	40	0.21	0	60	0.32	0	0
Total	19,367	100.00	10	18,901	100.00	9	19
Valid votes	19,367	98.43		18,901	98.31		
Invalid/blank votes	309	1.57		324	1.69		
Total votes	19,676	100.00		19,225	100.00		
Registered voters/turnout	31,417	62.63		31,417	61.19		

== November 2021 election ==
The following table shows the results of the 2021 election.

Party	Ward			List			Total seats
Party	Votes	%	Seats	Votes	%	Seats	Total seats
African National Congress	8,229	44.27	10	8,220	44.45	0	10
Hope for the Future	3,992	21.48	0	3,976	21.50	4	4
Democratic Alliance	3,314	17.83	0	3,372	18.24	3	3
Economic Freedom Fighters	863	4.64	0	985	5.33	1	1
Freedom Front Plus	595	3.20	0	528	2.86	1	1
Patriotic Alliance	435	2.34	0	517	2.80	0	0
Khoisan Revolution	454	2.44	0	492	2.66	0	0
Independent candidates	414	2.23	0				0
Good	159	0.86	0	150	0.81	0	0
Congress of the People	20	0.11	0	127	0.69	0	0
Independent South African National Civic Organisation	70	0.38	0	76	0.41	0	0
Africa Restoration Alliance	44	0.24	0	48	0.26	0	0
Total	18,589	100.00	10	18,491	100.00	9	19
Valid votes	18,589	98.36		18,491	96.99		
Invalid/blank votes	310	1.64		573	3.01		
Total votes	18,899	100.00		19,064	100.00		
Registered voters/turnout	30,846	61.27		30,846	61.80		

=== By-elections from November 2021 ===
The following by-elections were held to fill vacant ward seats in the period from November 2021.

Date	Ward	Party of the previous councillor	Party of the newly elected councillor
2 February 2022	2	African National Congress	African National Congress
11 October 2023	3	African National Congress	African National Congress
