= ActionSA =

South African political party

- President: Herman Mashaba
- Chairperson: Michael Beaumont
- Spokesperson: Lerato Ngobeni
- Deputy President: Mbahare Kekana
- Chief strategist: André Coetzee
- Director of operations: John Moodey
- Communications director: Sam Mgobozi
- Chief director of governance: Nasiphi Moya
- Founder: Herman Mashaba
- Founded: 29 August 2020; 6 years ago
- Split from: Democratic Alliance
- Ideology: Classical liberalism; Non-racialism Anti-immigration; Anti-corruption; South African nationalism; Faction: Libertarianism
- Political position: Centre-right to right-wing
- National affiliation: 2023–2024: Multi-Party Charter (MPC)
- Colours: Green
- National Assembly: 6 / 400
- National Council of Provinces: 1 / 90
- Provincial Legislatures: 5 / 487
- City of Johannesburg Metropolitan Municipality: 44 / 270
- City of Cape Town Metropolitan Municipality: 7 / 235

Website
- www.actionsa.org.za

ActionSA is a political party in South Africa established in 2020 by Herman Mashaba, a former mayor of Johannesburg, shortly after he left the Democratic Alliance (DA).

The party states that its purpose is to "set South Africa free from the restraints of a broken political system and build a prosperous, non-racial, and secure future for all its people."

In the 2024 general election, ActionSA won six seats in the National Assembly with 1.2% of the vote. In June 2024, ActionSA declined an invitation to join the ANC-led Government of National Unity.

== Formation ==
=== Party launch ===
On 29 August 2020, a former Mayor of Johannesburg, Herman Mashaba, announced that he had started a new political party, which would be known as ActionSA, and was intending to run for the three Gauteng metro cities (Johannesburg, Ekurhuleni and Tshwane) in the 2021 local government elections. The party soon gained notoriety as it brought together former politicians who were dissatisfied with big parties such as the DA and ANC. Makhosi Khoza, Vytjie Mentor and David Tembe were amongst the former ANC politicians who joined the newly formed ActionSA. On 5 October 2020, former DA provincial leader, John Moodey, announced that he had joined ActionSA. He was followed by numerous former DA councillors, along with leaders like Abel Tau, Funzi Ngobeni and former DA Johannesburg youth leader, Lincoln Machaba.

Noting how many of its leaders came from the DA, the party's inaugural spokesperson said that "the party was not formed as part of a detraction for the DA, but the need to create an alternative towards a shared future."

The party was quickly criticised by then newly elected leader of the DA, John Steenhuisen, who noted every time a voter supports a small party like ActionSA, "the net result is the strengthening of the ANC. We've been through this scenario so many times. As soon as the elections are over, voters who tested the waters with one of these new start-ups realise they got zero bang for their buck from a one-man party with a regional footprint, and they return to the DA. But by then the damage is done for the next five years." Steenhuisen's critique was not at these party's policies but rather that they are "too small" to impart any change. This criticism was followed by Steenhuisen's chief-of-staff's opinion piece which labelled ActionSA as "EFF-lite in disguise." In an open letter to Steenhuisen, Moodey criticised this opinion piece and what he called the DA's "race denialism" and defended ActionSA's vision and its leaders' reasons for leaving the DA. Moodey claimed that "Herman left the DA because it gave up on the project of being a serious political party that could challenge and unseat the ANC."

=== IEC registration ===
A month after the party was launched, the Independent Electoral Commission (IEC) rejected the party's application to register itself as an official political party. This was due to another party, Party of Action, claiming that ActionSA had stolen its logo. On this claim, Mashaba noted that "[t]he IEC's decision is based on a perceived similarity with another political party and the use of the SA flag in our logo. We have already written to the IEC, initiating our right to appeal their decision as a result of its incorrect application of the law. We regard the IEC to have acted irrationally in their decision. We submit that our identifying features remain sufficiently different from the Party of Action (POA), a political party that has never contested elections before despite registering."

The party's appeal was again rejected by the IEC on the same basis.

On 13 December 2020, the party was officially registered with the IEC, notably under a new logo.

== Funding ==
When the party was launched, Herman Mashaba claimed he was fully funding it himself. Mashaba claimed that the funding for the party came "from my own pocket, & supporters on the ground" but this has never been verified and it appears to be contradictory. In 2021 it was revealed that in the first quarter of the year ActionSA had received more than R3.3 million in funding from donors above the threshold of R100,000, of which only R121,490 was from Mashaba's company Black Like Me and R2.5million came from the Israeli-South African businessman Martin Moshal. In the second quarter of 2021 the party received a further large donation of R5million from Moshal and three donations totalling R10million from members of the Oppenheimer family.

Subsequent funding declarations have shown that the party's main funder is Martin Moshal, who also funded multiple other anti-ANC parties including the Democratic Alliance, Build One South Africa and the Inkatha Freedom Party; as a result Moshal has been referred to as a 'king-maker' in South African politics despite living in Australia. Moshal donated R47million over five years, while two members of the Oppenheimer Family, Victoria Freudenheim and Jessica Slack-Jell, donated a further R42million over the same period.

== Ideology and principles ==
=== Values ===
According to the party's website, the party has seven core values:

- Electoral reform (Direct democracy)
- Economic prosperity
- Non-racialism
- Quality education
- Social justice
- Ethical leadership
- Rule of law

The party's current main policies focus on what it calls the solution blueprints on:

- Climate change and the environment
- Electoral reform
- Professional public service
- Ethical leadership
- Immigration
- Rule of law
- Land reform and housing
- Quality education
- Social justice
- Non-racialism
- Economic prosperity

The party also has made strong calls for tougher immigration policy, and the party's leader, Herman Mashaba, has made various statements about immigrants that some observers have criticised as xenophobic. However, during the party's 2024 election campaign, the party condemned xenophobia and called for simplifying legal immigration to South Africa, particularly for skilled workers.

In January 2026, ActionSA representatives in the Eastern Cape discussed the use of advanced water management technologies to address infrastructure challenges. Provincial chairperson Athol Trollip stated that the province was "water-scarce" with significant infrastructure issues, adding that it could "benefit significantly from Israeli expertise" in water management. These remarks were made in the context of water-related policy proposals advanced by the party in 2024 highlighting South Africa's water crisis.

=== Party structure ===
ActionSA has not held any internal elections. The party constitution states that it was to hold internal elections within nine months of the 2024 elections. However, as of August 2025, fifteen months later, the party has not held any internal elections. Spokesperson Matthew George stated that the party was working to establish branches in 70% of wards before holding any elections. In these elections, only the president is due to be elected, with the president then appointing all top leaders.

== Mergers ==
In January 2025, the party merged with Forum 4 Service Delivery (F4SD), and plans to contest the 2026 local government elections under the ActionSA banner. F4SD leader Mbahare Kekana was appointed Deputy President of ActionSA.

In February 2025, the party also merged with Capricorn Independent Community Activists Forum (CICAF), Magošhi Swaragang Movement (MSM) and Democratic Union Party (DUP) in the Limpopo Province.

== Prominent figures recruitment ==
Over the years, Herman Mashaba has held meetings with quite a number of prominent South African figures. He has been spotted with the party deputy president, Dr Mbahare Kekana.

1. Xolani Khumalo deployed to the City of Ekurhuleni as Caucus Leader and Mayoral Candidate for 2026 Local Government Elections. Khumalo is a Sizok'thola Presenter and an anti drug activist interested in keeping drug dealers out of communities.
2. Mary Phadi currently serving in Senate and appointed Mpumalanga Provincial Campaign Manager. Mary Phadi is a former leader of MKP in the same province. She is also president of the Truckers Association of South Africa. Phadi has been named as ActionSA Mayoral Candidate for iNkangala.
3. Ayanda Allie, a former BOSA Member of Gauteng Legislature. Allie is serving as Herman Mashaba's Mayoral Governance Campaign Team for Development Planning. She is also the Gauteng Ambassador for Service Delivery.
4. Zandile Dabula former president of Operation Dudula. She joined ActionSA after the famous tea meeting with Mashaba. She serves in the Senate alongside national leaders and is also a member of Mashaba's Mayoral Governance Campaign Team for Local Government Elections 2026.
5. Gabriel Temudzani is a former Muvhango lead cast. He has portrayed a role of a Vhenda Chief within an extremely divided family of Vhakwevho.
6. Tumi Sole a lawyer by profession joined ActionSA after the 'tea'. Although he has since exited public politics, his endorsement of ActionSA has not changed.

== Election results ==
In 2024, the party contested its first national and provincial elections in South Africa.

=== National Assembly elections ===
Election	Party leader	Total votes	Share of vote	Seats	+/–	Government
2024	Herman Mashaba	192,373	1.20% (Note: From 2024, seats in the National Assembly are determined by a combination of the national ballot, and the nine regional ballots. Only the national ballot figures are shown here.)	6 / 400	▲6	in opposition

Members of Parliament

1. Athol Trollip - Caucus Parliamentary Leader
2. Lerato Ngobeni - Caucus Whip and National Spokesperson
3. Dr Kgosi Letlape
4. Malebo Kobe
5. Alan Beesley
6. Dereleen James - Deputy Chairperson (Committee on Multi-Party Women's Caucus), Western Cape Provincial Chairperson and the City of Cape Town Mayoral Candidate

=== National Council of Provinces elections ===
Election	Total # of seats won	+/–	Government
2024	1 / 90	▲1	in opposition

=== Provincial elections ===
Election	Eastern Cape		Free State		Gauteng		Kwazulu-Natal		Limpopo		Mpumalanga		North-West		Northern Cape		Western Cape	
Election	%	Seats	%	Seats	%	Seats	%	Seats	%	Seats	%	Seats	%	Seats	%	Seats	%	Seats
2024	0.46	0/73	0.54	0/30	4.16	3/80	0.27	0/80	0.65	0/64	0.50	1/51	1.70	1/38	0.51	0/30	0.29	0/42

Members of the Provincial Legislatures

Gauteng Legislature

1. Funzi Ngobeni
2. John Moodey
3. Emma ore

North West Legislature

1. Masego Kodisang

Mpumalanga Legislature

1. Thokozile Mashiane

=== Municipal elections ===
In the 2021 municipal elections, the party contested a limited number of municipalities, namely the cities of Johannesburg, Tshwane and Ekurhuleni in Gauteng as well as eThekwini, KwaDukuza and Newcastle in KwaZulu-Natal. It won 90 seats in the six municipal councils, including a ward in Newcastle.

Election	Votes	%	Seats
2021	547,905	2.34%	90
2026		5.67%	

In July 2023, ActionSA participated in a City of Johannesburg by-election in Ward 7. The party grew its support from 5% to 14%, finishing third behind the Patriotic Alliance and African National Congress.

== See also ==
- South African politics
- Democratic Alliance
- African National Congress
- Economic Freedom Fighters
- Multi-Party Charter
