= Neil de Beer =

South African politician, businessman and consultant (1968–2025)

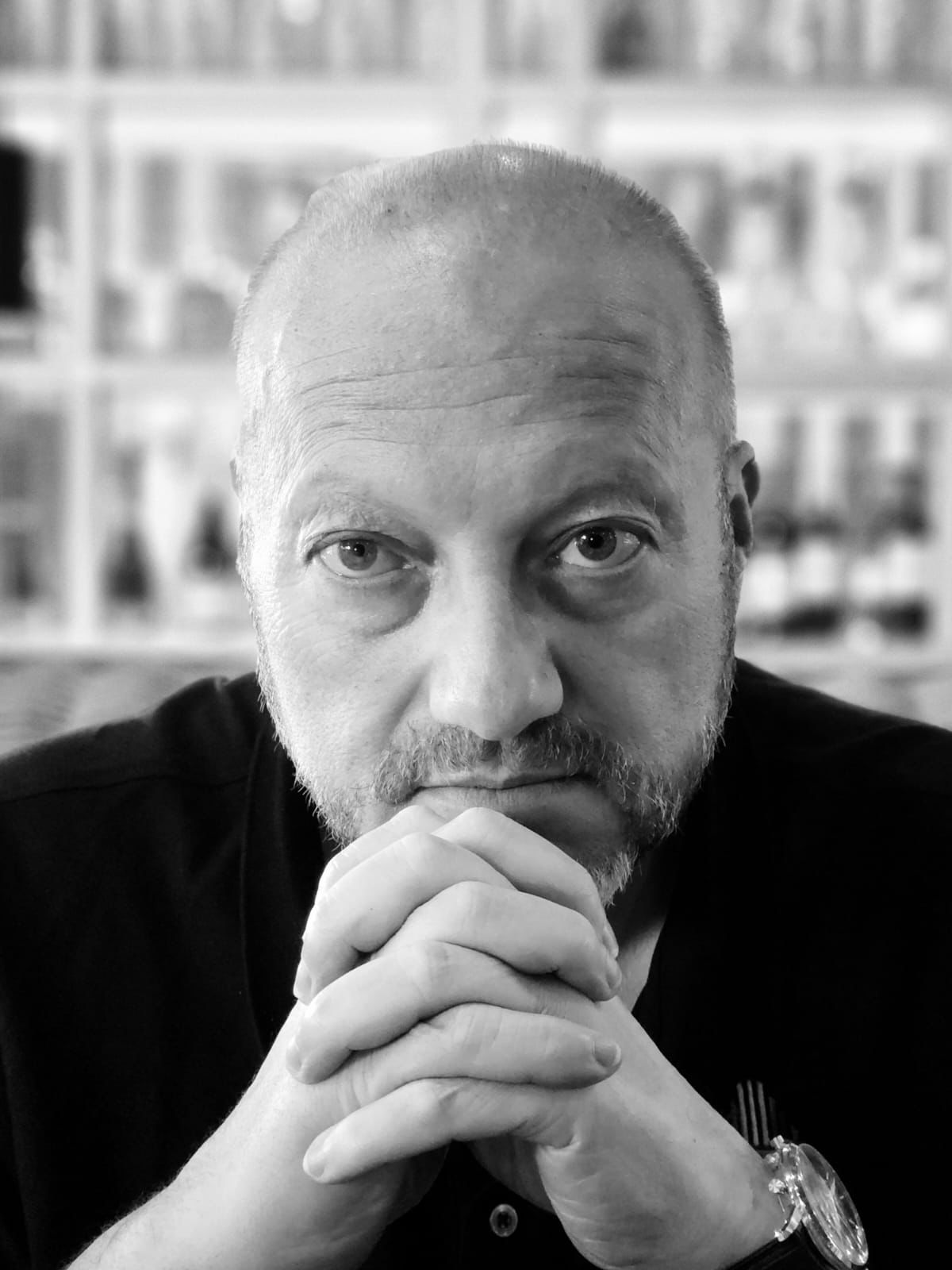
- Neil De Beer in 2024

President of the United Independent Movement
- In office 1 October 2020 – 30 August 2025

Personal details
- Born: 1968 Stellenbosch, Cape Province, South Africa
- Died: 30 August 2025 (aged 56)
- Party: United Independent Movement (2020–2025)
- Other political affiliations: African National Congress (1987–2020)
- Occupation: Politician; Businessman; Security consultant

Neil de Beer (1968 – 30 August 2025) was a South African politician, businessman and security consultant.

== Life and career ==
De Beer was born in 1968 in Stellenbosch, Cape Province, South Africa. He was conscripted to the South African Defence Force in 1987 and was deployed to Angola. A year later, he defected from the apartheid security police to the then-banned uMkhonto weSizwe, the armed wing of the African National Congress (ANC), working as an intelligence operative.

De Beer stated that he began to question his beliefs while interrogating a prisoner, who told him that "You can kill me, you can murder me but after me comes a million and after that another million. Because this is not about race, this is about dignity."

De Beer later became national security adviser to President Nelson Mandela.

De Beer left the ANC in 2020, stating that the party had lost its way, and that Nelson Mandela would not have supported it in its then form, and formed the United Independent Movement (UIM), of which he was president until his death in 2025. Initially intended to be a political movement, the UIM registered as a political party in August 2021. De Beer, then aged 52, stated that he wanted to be the youngest president in South Africa.

The UIM joined the Multi-Party Charter prior to the 2024 South African general election.

De Beer also ran a number of businesses.

De Beer died from colon cancer on 30 August 2025, at the age of 56.
