= Martin Moshal =

South African businessman

- Born: Martin Paul Moshal; 1970 (age 55–56); Durban, South Africa
- Education: Carmel College
- Alma mater: University of Cape Town
- Known for: Founder of Microgaming

Martin Paul Moshal (born 1970) is a South African venture capitalist, philanthropist, and online gambling entrepreneur. He co-founded Microgaming and Entrée Capital. He is also a major political donor to opposition parties in South Africa.

== Life and career ==
Moshal was born in Durban, South Africa in 1970. His father, John Moshal, was an electronics entrepreneur and a prominent member of the South African Jewish Board of Deputies. He grew up in Durban, attending Carmel College, and completed a business science degree at the University of Cape Town in 1992.

After graduating from university, Moshal founded Microgaming; his co-founder, Roger Raatgever, was a merchant banker who agreed to co-sign Moshal's loan for startup costs in exchange for a 50-per-cent stake in the company. In 1994 Microgaming launched the Gaming Club in South Africa with the domain casino.co.za. During this period, from his home in Durban, Moshal developed a series of patents for online gambling technologies; among other things, Microgaming launched the world's first online progressive jackpot slot game, Cash Splash, in 1998.

In later years, with Aviad Eyal, Moshal co-founded Entrée Capital, a venture capital fund incorporated on the Isle of Man. He has personal investments in a number of industries, including real estate and technology, and has been an angel investor in companies including Zapper and Monday.com.

== Political activities and philanthropy ==
In recent years, Moshal has been a major political donor in South Africa. In 2019, on the basis of leaked emails, News24 reported that Cyril Ramaphosa's CR17 campaign, possibly using Mick Davis as an intermediary, had solicited Moshal to sponsor Ramaphosa's successful efforts to be elected as president of the African National Congress. Davis denied any involvement and Moshal could not be reached for comment.

Between 2021 and 2023, Moshal accounted for 16 per cent of all reported donations to South African political parties, some R44.5 million; his donations went primarily to ActionSA and, in smaller amounts, to the Democratic Alliance. ActionSA's founder, Herman Mashaba, said that he had known Moshal before he went into politics and "he was willing to back me up because he knows me as a capitalist... Martin was one of the first to come to the party." Moshal said that he viewed it as his duty to support "all centre-left and centre-right parties." In 2023 he was apparently one of the key backers of the so-called Moonshot Pact that aimed to unify centre-right opposition parties in an electoral coalition.

In 2009 Moshal founded the Moshal Program, which provides scholarships to disadvantaged students in South Africa and Israel. He also funds the Moshal Space Foundation, which invested in SpaceIL's Beresheet 2 initiative. He is also responsible for the third-largest donation in history to the Yad Vashem Holocaust Remembrance Centre; he endowed the centre's Moshal Shoah Legacy Campus.

== Personal life ==
Moshal's wife, Ilana, is a children's clothing designer; she was born in Jerusalem in 1979 and moved to South Africa in 1990. The couple have four children. Formerly resident in London, England, Moshal now lives on Sydney Harbour in Sydney, Australia, where he sits on the capital management advisory committee of Moriah College. His cousin, Greg Moshal, co-founded the Australian lending company Prospa, and his sister, Karyn Moshal, founded CHIVA Africa.
