= Michael Beaumont =

Michael Beaumont may refer to:

- Michael Beaumont (British politician) (1903–1958), British Conservative politician
- Michael Beaumont (South African politician) (born 1985), South African politician and strategist
- Michael Beaumont, 22nd Seigneur of Sark (1927–2016), Seigneur of Sark from 1974
