= Multi-Party Charter =

Political alliance in South Africa

- Abbreviation: MPC; MPCSA
- Chairperson: William Gumede
- Founders: John Steenhuisen (DA); Velenkosini Hlabisa (IFP); Pieter Groenewald (FF Plus); Herman Mashaba (ActionSA); Other founders: Zukile Luyenge (ISANCO); Neil de Beer (UIM); Christopher Claassen (SNP)
- Founded: 17 August 2023
- Dissolved: 3 June 2024
- Ideology: Anti-corruption; Non-racialism; Anti-ANC; Anti-EFF; Anti-MK Party; Anti-PA; Disputed: Decentralisation
- Political position: Centre-right
- Charter parties: Democratic Alliance; Inkatha Freedom Party; Freedom Front Plus; African Christian Democratic Party; Other parties: Independent South African National Civic Organisation; United Independent Movement; Spectrum National Party; United Christian Democratic Party; Ekhethu People's Party; Unemployed National Party
- National Assembly: 113 / 400
- National Council of Provinces: 25 / 90
- Provincial Legislatures: 124 / 487
- Politics of South Africa; Political parties; Elections; A: The largest party in the coalition, the Democratic Alliance (DA) is usually described as a broadly centrist, liberal party while smaller parties such as the IFP, FF Plus and ACDP are usually described as leaning right ideologically (see table below). B: The Spectrum National Party, Ekhethu People's Party and Unemployed National Party did not contest in the 2024 South African general election.

The Multi-Party Charter (MPC), officially the Multi-Party Charter For South Africa (MPCSA), formerly known as the Moonshot Pact, was a pre-election agreement in South Africa that presented a united front in the 2024 South African general election against the three-decade rule of the African National Congress (ANC) and the recent rise of the controversial Economic Freedom Fighters (EFF), uMkhonto we Sizwe (MK Party) and Patriotic Alliance (PA).

After the 2024 general election, the MPC dissolved after failing to obtain enough votes to form a government. Subsequently after dissolution, the majority of the main MPC parties joined the ANC-DA lead Government of National Unity (GNU), apart from the African Christian Democratic Party and ActionSA.

== History ==
=== Early formation ===
In early 2023, the African National Congress (ANC) and Economic Freedom Fighters (EFF) formed a coalition in Johannesburg and Ekurhuleni where the two parties hold MMC (member of the municipal council) positions whilst electing a mayor from a minority party. In April 2023, noting the prospects of an ANC/EFF national coalition, the Democratic Alliance (DA) leader John Steenhuisen called for "like-minded" parties to join together to prevent a "doomsday coalition".

On 17 August 2023, the pre-election agreement called the Multi-Party Charter was signed between the Democratic Alliance (DA), Inkatha Freedom Party (IFP), Freedom Front Plus (FF Plus), ActionSA, Independent South African National Civic Organisation (ISANCO), United Independent Movement (UIM) and Spectrum National Party (SNP). The charter group held 108 out of the 400 seat National Assembly.

On 7 October 2023, the African Christian Democratic Party (ACDP) announced it would be joining the charter, increasing the charter's seat count from 108 to 112 in the 400 seat National Assembly.

On 14 December 2023, the Multi-Party Charter announced that two new parties joined the group: the North West-based United Christian Democratic Party (UCDP) and the Gauteng-based Ekhethu People’s Party (EPP).

The Unemployed National Party (UNP) also became a member of the charter.

=== Disputes ===
On 16 February 2024, the Multi-Party Charter rejected the application of the Referendum Party (RP), due to the party's singular support for Cape independence. This is despite the Freedom Front Plus (FF Plus) party also being in favor of Cape independence. Critics claimed that this casts doubt on the charter's claimed support for political decentralisation.

=== 2024 elections ===
Three of the charter's eleven members failed to garner the minimum number of signatures required by the Independent Electoral Commission and will not be contesting in the 2024 South African general election: the Spectrum National Party, Ekhethu People's Party and Unemployed National Party.

During the 2024 election, the parties in the charter collectively won 119 of the 400 seats in the National Assembly, increasing the number of seats by 7.

The Democratic Alliance (DA) and Inkatha Freedom Party (IFP) gained 3 seats each while the Freedom Front Plus (FF Plus) and African Christian Democratic Party (ACDP) lost 4 and 1 seats respectively. The newly formed ActionSA underperformed expectations as the party only garnered 1.2% of the votes, which translated to 6 seats.

On 6 June 2024, ActionSA announced they would leave the Multi-Party Charter as the party believed the charter had breached the agreement by considering forming a coalition with the ANC. This decision reduced the charter's seat count from 119 to 113 in the 400 seat National Assembly.

== Priorities and principles ==
At the joint press statement by the six founding parties the coalition government's priorities were laid out as:

- Growing the economy
- Creating jobs
- Energy security
- Combatting crime
- Combatting corruption and drugs
- Quality education for all
- High quality infrastructure
- Quality healthcare for all
- Relieving South African households living in poverty

The coalition's agreed-upon principles, called "Shared Governing Principles", are:

- The South African constitution, rule of law, and equality before the law
- Decentralising the power of government
- A transparent government
- Zero tolerance towards corruption
- Efficient spending of public money by the government
- An open market economy
- Evidence-based policies
- Promoting non-racialism and unity in the country's diversity

== Political parties ==
The table below lists the parties in the charter. As of 2024, the parties in the charter collectively hold 113 of the 400 seats in the National Assembly.

=== Main parties ===
Abbr.	Name	Ideology	Political position	Leader	Seats	Vote % at the 2024 election	Government
DA	Democratic Alliance	Liberalism; Federalism	Centre-right	John Steenhuisen	87 / 400	21.81%	Government
IFP	Inkatha Freedom Party; IQembu leNkatha yeNkululeko	Conservatism; Constitutional monarchy	Centre-right	Velenkosini Hlabisa	17 / 400	3.85%	Government
FF Plus	Freedom Front Plus; Vryheidsfront Plus	Conservatism; Afrikaners interests	Right-wing to far-right	Pieter Groenewald	6 / 400	1.36%	Government
ACDP	African Christian Democratic Party	Christian right; Social conservatism	Centre-right to right-wing	Kenneth Meshoe	3 / 400	0.6%	Opposition

=== Other parties ===
Abbr.	Name	Ideology	Political position	Leader
ISANCO	Independent South African National Civic Organisation			Zukile Luyenge
UIM	United Independent Movement	Christian democracy	Centre-right	Neil de Beer
SNP	Spectrum National Party (Note: Did not contest in the 2024 South African general election.)	Non-racialism; Anti-corruption	Centre-right	Christopher Claassen
UCDP	United Christian Democratic Party	Christian democracy	Centre-right	Modiri Desmond Sehume
EPP	Ekhethu People's Party			Mahlubi John Madela
UNP	Unemployed National Party			Prince Nkwana

=== Former member parties ===
Abbr.	Name	Ideology	Political position	Leader	Seats	Vote % at the 2024 election
ActionSA	ActionSA	Classical liberalism; Libertarianism	Centre-right	Herman Mashaba	6 / 400	1.2%

== See also ==
- 2024 South African general election
