= United Independent Movement =

Political party from South Africa

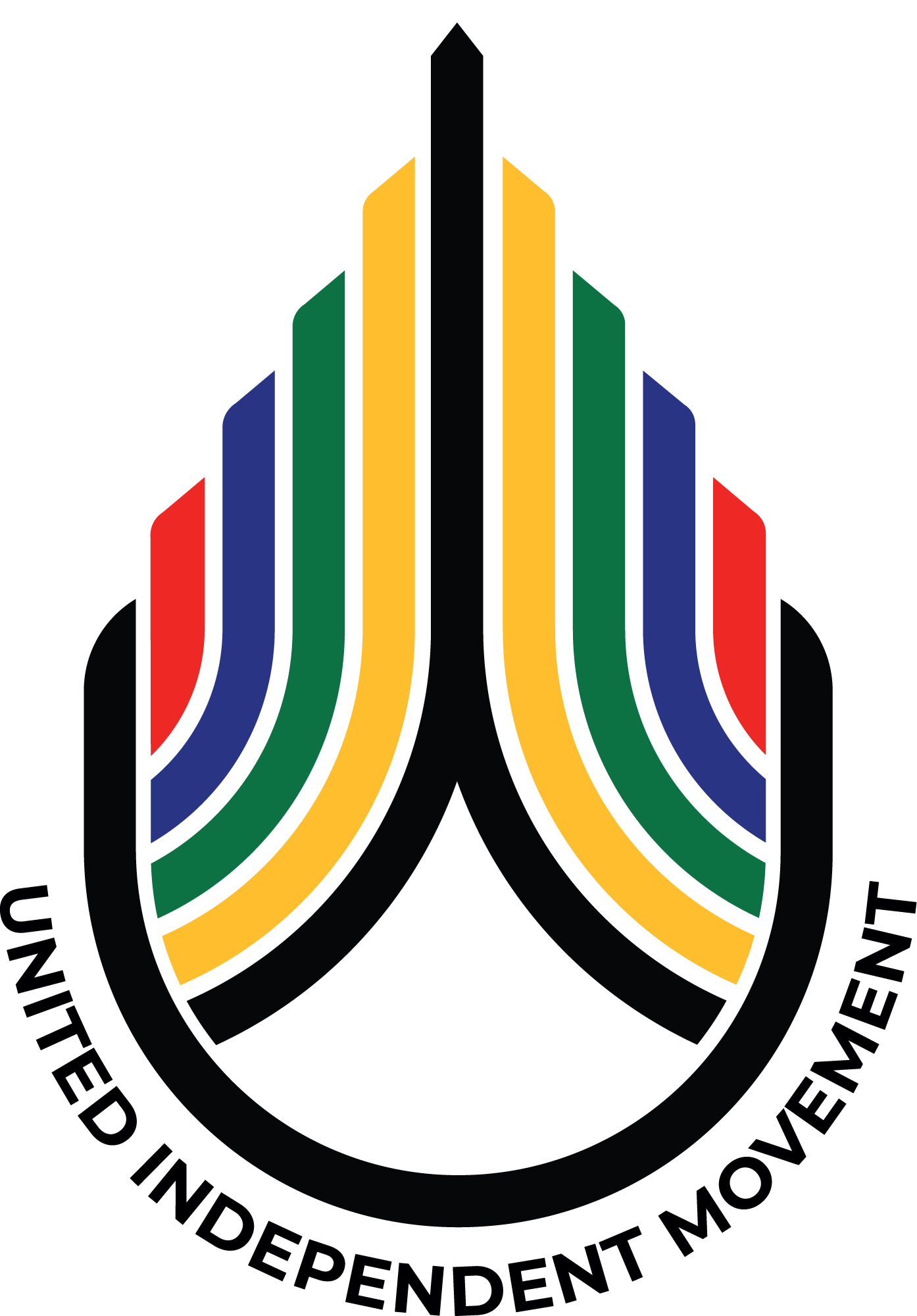
- Abbreviation: UIM
- President: Jacques Taljaard
- Vice-President: Fatima Abdool
- Founder: Neil de Beer
- Founded: 1 October 2020; 5 years ago
- Split from: African National Congress
- Ideology: Anti-abortion; Neo-liberalism; Christian democracy
- Political position: Right-wing to Centre-right
- National affiliation: Multi-Party Charter (MPC)
- Slogan: Together we will
- National Assembly: 0 / 400
- NCOP: 0 / 90
- Provincial Legislatures: 0 / 430

Website
- uimsa.org

The United Independent Movement (UIM) is a South African political party founded by Neil de Beer, former national security advisor to Nelson Mandela and a former uMkhonto we Sizwe operative.

== History ==
The party initially formed as a civil society movement after de Beer had lost faith in the African National Congress (ANC). The movement supported the country's independent candidacy programme. Shortly after its formation, former Democratic Alliance (DA) leader Mmusi Maimane announced a symbiotic relationship with his One South Africa group.

De Beer, who had served as president since the party's formation, died of cancer in August 2025.

Jacques Taljaard was elected president in October 2025.

== Political beliefs ==
In March 2021, De Beer said in an interview that he and his supporters were "tired" of the "ultra-left and the ultra-right" in South African politics and that he and his party would represent the "moderate middle".

As part of his campaign for Mayor of Cape Town, in August 2021, De Beer stated that he believes the root cause of criminality is poor social-economic conditions, which must be addressed. Simultaneously, he also stated that he and UIM would have a "zero tolerance" approach to gang violence and "domestic terrorism". In September 2021, De Beer stated two policies which caused him to leave the ANC were the nationalisation of the Reserve Bank and land without compensation, policies de Beer believed destroyed Foreign Direct Investment into South Africa. De Beer has suggested that South Africa should instead draw revenue from its exports and reinvest that into local industries.

In September 2021, UIM Vice-President Fatima Abdool stated that the party is an open and inclusive one built on Christian values. She has stated the party would demonstrate complete tolerance of the LGBT community. She has also stated the party is pro-life on the issue of abortion, but would not oppose abortions in the case of rape.

== Election results ==
=== National Assembly elections ===
Election	Party leader	Total votes	Share of vote	Seats	+/–	Government
2024	Neil de Beer	20,003	0.12% (Note: From 2024, seats in the National Assembly are determined by a combination of the national ballot, and the nine regional ballots. Only the national ballot figures are shown here.)	0 / 400	New	Extra-parliamentary

=== Municipal elections ===
De Beer announced in November 2020 that he had the intention of becoming the youngest President of South Africa.

The party registered for the 2021 South African municipal elections, and contested eight metros and 1000 wards, with de Beer as a candidate for Mayor of Cape Town. The UIM won three METRO seats in the 2021 LGE under the leadership of their National Election Coordinator Brett Mario Correia: 1 seat in Johannesburg, Ethekwini and the City of Cape Town. In September 2021, former soccer player Kenny Niemach announced he had joined UIM and would be standing for the party in the municipal elections as a candidate in the Ward 31 (Boksburg) constituency in Ekurhuleni. Niemach said he was entering politics not to attack any party or race but to promote change in the system and demand that services be delivered. He cited De Beer's involvement in local communities for motivating him to join UIM.

The UIM polled 12th out of 56 parties in the City of Cape Town, 17th out of 97 parties contesting in the Western Cape Province and 26th out of 325 contesting parties nationally.
