= William Gumede =

South African writer

- Born: William Mervin Gumede; 11 July 1973 (age 53)
- Education: University of the Witwatersrand
- Occupations: Writer; political commentator
- Spouse: Ylva Rodny-Gumede
- Website: williamgumede.com

William Mervin Gumede (born 11 July 1973) is a South African writer and public intellectual. He is known for his political commentary and his 2005 biography of Thabo Mbeki, Thabo Mbeki and the Battle for the Soul of the ANC.

== Early life and education ==
Gumede was born on 11 July 1973. He attended primary school on the Cape Flats and matriculated in 1988 at Ravensmead Senior Secondary School in Ravensmead. He holds a master's degree from the University of the Witwatersrand (Wits).

== Career ==
Gumede is a long-time writer and commentator on South African politics. In 2006, there were rumors that he and several other political analysts had been "blacklisted" from appearing on the public broadcaster, the South African Broadcasting Corporation (SABC), because they were overly critical of the incumbent African National Congress government. An independent investigation, led by Zwelakhe Sisulu and Gilbert Marcus, concluded that Gumede was not explicitly blacklisted, but that the SABC's head of news, Snuki Zikalala, had strongly insinuated to staff members that he disapproved of Gumede's commentary.

In August 2023, Gumede was named as the chairman of the negotiations toward the Multi-Party Charter for South Africa, a pre-electoral pact between several South African opposition parties ahead of the next year's general election. The parties said that he had been chosen because of his political neutrality, and he said that he accepted because he believed that cooperation among opposition parties could serve as a counterweight to the dominance of the ANC.

He is the founder of the Democracy Works Foundation and the Institute for Social Dialogue. Until 2025, he was also an associate professor at the Wits School of Governance in Johannesburg.

== Books ==
Gumede has written several books. The best known is his biography of Thabo Mbeki, first published in 2005 during Mbeki's presidency; titled Thabo Mbeki and the Battle for the Soul of the ANC, it was a bestseller in South Africa. In 2006, the Mail & Guardian printed allegations that the book relied on other sources without proper attribution, including by closely paraphrasing Mark Gevisser's rival biography of Mbeki. Gumede strongly denied the allegations, pointing to his system of "indirect references" and saying that he was "the victim of an anonymous smear campaign".

== Personal life ==
Gumede is married to Ylva Rodny-Gumede, a Swedish journalist and academic who works at the University of Johannesburg. They have three sons.

In early 2019, Gumede was diagnosed with stage IV lymphoma, which he treated with surgery and three years of chemotherapy.
