= Chapter One of the Constitution of South Africa =

Chapter 1 of the Constitution of South Africa, titled Founding Provisions and containing six sections, enshrines in the constitution key national principles, defines the country's flag and national anthem, and specifies the official languages and principles of government language policy.

== Sections ==
=== Section 1, Republic of South Africa ===
Defines South Africa as "one, sovereign, democratic state" and lists the country's founding values as:

- Human dignity, the achievement of equality and the advancement of human rights and freedoms.
- Non-racialism and non-sexism.
- Supremacy of the constitution and the rule of law.
- Universal adult suffrage, a national common voters roll, regular elections and a multi-party system of democratic government, to ensure accountability, responsiveness and openness.

This section is more deeply entrenched than the rest of the constitution; it would require the agreement of three-quarters (300) of the members of the National Assembly and six of the nine provincial delegations in the National Council of Provinces to amend it.

=== Section 2, Supremacy of Constitution ===
The supremacy clause; it declares that any other law or conduct that is inconsistent with the constitution is invalid. This section gives the Constitutional Court and the other courts the power to overturn acts of Parliament, elements of the common law and actions of the executive that are unconstitutional. And supremacy is the most important aspect in this case

=== Section 3, Citizenship ===
Declares that there is a common South African citizenship, and that all citizens have equal rights and responsibilities. This is a response to the apartheid-era policies under which the government revoked the South African citizenship of many black people, making them instead citizens of the nominally-independent bantustans.

=== Section 4, National anthem ===
National anthem of South Africa

Allows the President to specify the national anthem by proclamation.

=== Section 5, National flag ===
Flag of South Africa

Defines the national flag by reference to Schedule 1, which contains a detailed geometrical description.

=== Section 6, Languages ===
Lists the official languages, identified as Sepedi, Sesotho, Setswana, siSwati, Tshivenda, Xitsonga, Afrikaans, English, isiNdebele, isiXhosa and isiZulu. It also sets basic principles of language policy, requiring the government to advance the use of indigenous languages while allowing national, provincial and local government to take into account practical and demographic factors in choosing languages for the purposes of government. The section also establishes the Pan South African Language Board, which must advance the use of the official languages, the Khoi, Nama and San languages, and sign language, and advance respect for other languages used by communities or religious groups in South Africa.
