= Herman Mashaba =

South African politician

The Honourable Herman Mashaba
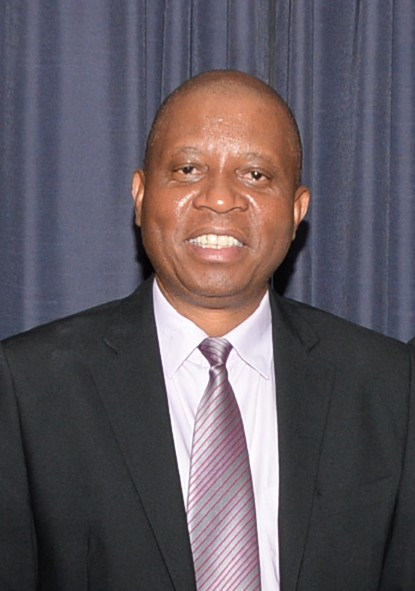
- Mashaba in 2019

President of ActionSA Founder of ActionSA
- Incumbent
- Assumed office 29 August 2020
- Preceded by: Party founded

Mayor of Johannesburg
- In office 22 August 2016 – 27 November 2019
- Preceded by: Parks Tau
- Succeeded by: Geoff Makhubo

Member of the Johannesburg City Council
- In office 22 November 2021 – 31 January 2022
- In office 22 August 2016 – 27 November 2019

Personal details
- Born: Herman Samtseu Philip Mashaba; 26 August 1959 (age 67) Hammanskraal, Transvaal, Union of South Africa
- Citizenship: South Africa
- Party: ActionSA (since 2020)
- Other political affiliations: Democratic Alliance (2014–2019)
- Spouse: Connie Mashaba
- Profession: Politician; entrepreneur

Herman Samtseu Philip Mashaba (born 26 August 1959) is a South African politician, entrepreneur and the current president of ActionSA, a party he launched on 29 August 2020. He served as the Mayor of Johannesburg from 2016 to 2019, and is the founder of the hair product company Black Like Me.

Mashaba is famous in South Africa for his background: he grew up struggling against poverty, and claims to have struggled against the apartheid government to open his own hair business, which became the biggest hair brand in South Africa, making him a millionaire. He publicly backed Mmusi Maimane in the Democratic Alliance leadership race. He wrote the autobiography Black Like You and his campaign manager, Michael Beaumont, recently published a biography called "The Accidental Mayor". A biography of Mashaba later published by Prince Mashele was referred to as "unauthorised" until it controversially emerged that Mashaba himself had paid Mashele R12.5million for the project. Mashaba refers to himself as a libertarian and "capitalist crusader" whose highest value is "individual freedom."

On 22 August 2016, Mashaba was elected Mayor of Johannesburg by the first sitting of the city council following countrywide local government elections. He announced his resignation on 21 October 2019 and left office on 27 November 2019.

After launching his new party, Mashaba announced he would run for Mayor of Johannesburg again in the 2021 municipal elections, as the ActionSA candidate.

In February 2026, Mashaba announced he would compete for his party's nomination to run for Mayor of Johannesburg in the 2026 South African municipal elections.

== Early life and career ==
Mashaba was brought up in near-poverty in GaRamotse in Hammanskraal, north of Pretoria by his sisters while his mother worked to provide for the family.

His older brother dropped out of school at 15, moving from one unsubstantial job to another. Mashaba realised that acquiring an education would be crucial for him to break out of the cycle of poverty. He graduated from high school but did not complete his tertiary education.

His first two jobs were as a clerk at Spar and then at a furniture manufacturer. After two years he was able to buy a car. He started selling "SuperKurl" African hair-care products and became their number-one earner. He soon realised that these products excited him and that he wasn't content to be just an employee.

He partnered with his white Afrikaner colleague at SuperKurl Johan Kriel and fellow salesman Joseph Molwantwa to launch the company, Black Like Me. It was launched on Valentine's Day in 1985 with a R 30,000 loan from Mashaba's friend, businessman Walter Dube. Mashaba later bought out Kriel and Molwantwa.

In 2002 Black Like Me launched in the UK; this meant that Mashaba made history as owner and CEO of the first black-owned South African company to sell its products in the UK and international markets.

Over the years he has invested and has business interests in various sectors: mining, construction, exhibitions, real estate, security, aviation and IT.

Mashaba is also a music lover. After five years of secret lessons, he revealed himself as a pianist.

== Politics ==
From 2012 until May 2014, Mashaba served as chairman of the Free Market Foundation (FMF). He stepped down from his position when he joined the Democratic Alliance as an "ordinary card-carrying member", citing the need for the Foundation to remain politically impartial.

Mashaba announced in December 2015 that he would accept a nomination to stand as a Democratic Alliance mayoral candidate for the City of Johannesburg in the 2016 local government elections. The other possible DA candidate was Rabelani Dagada.

=== Mayor of Johannesburg ===
In the municipal election on 3 August 2016, the ruling party, The African National Congress, lost their majority in Johannesburg, taking only 44.12% of the vote with the Democratic Alliance taking 38.33%. The Democratic Alliance entered into conversations with the Economic Freedom Fighters to form a coalition. Whilst the EFF declined the offer, they agreed that they would vote for Mashaba as the Mayor of Johannesburg, despite misgivings.

On 22 August 2016, Mashaba was sworn in as a Johannesburg City Councillor. Later that day, he was sworn in as the Mayor of Johannesburg, the first non-ANC Johannesburg mayor since 1994. On 21 October 2019, he announced his resignation as mayor because of differences with DA party leadership. His resignation took effect on 27 November 2019.

=== Labour ===
Mashaba has characterised the ANC's post-Apartheid labour laws as "draconian".

He led a Constitutional Court challenge by the FMF, arguing that Section 32 of the Labour Relations Act is unconstitutional. The FMF argued that the bargaining council process reduces competition, as smaller businesses may not be able to afford the higher wages agreed on between larger businesses and unions, contributing further to South Africa's unemployment rate.

=== Post-mayoral career ===
Mashaba formed The People's Dialogue, a medium to interact with ordinary South Africans and discuss social and civil issues, which launched on 6 December 2019, and closed on 29 February 2020. The funding sources for this initiative have never been made public.

After considering running for Mayor of Johannesburg under a different party banner, Mashaba launched the new political party, ActionSA, on 29 August 2020. Mashaba claimed that the funding for the party came "from my own pocket, & supporters on the ground" but this has never been verified and it appears to be contradictory. In 2021 it was revealed that in the first quarter of the year ActionSA had received more than R3.3 million in funding from donors above the threshold of R100,000, of which only R121,490 was from Mashaba's company Black Like Me and R2.5million came from the Israeli-South African businessman Martin Moshal. In the second quarter of 2021 the party received a further large donation of R5million from Moshal and three donations totalling R10million from members of the Oppenheimer family.

IEC records show that amongst South Africa's party leaders, Mashaba has invested the most money towards his own party after pumping millions behind ActionSA.

After Russia invaded Ukraine in February 2022, Mashaba criticized the ruling ANC party for refusing to cut ties with Russia.

After the 2024 elections ActionSA announced that Mashaba would not be going to parliament, and that he would be focusing on building the party ahead of the next local elections.

In a press conference Mashaba said he did not need the salary of a member of parliament as he is privileged and his family can take care of him, he further elaborated that he would rather be focusing on teaching South Africans on the danger of politics of identity. After the election, the results "scared" him because people voted based on identity.

== Public profile ==
=== Allegations of xenophobia ===
Mashaba has made numerous public comments and actions that have been considered xenophobic and linked to incidence of xenophobic attacks and anti-immigrant sentiment. He has said South Africa has "nothing to apologise for" in reference to xenophobic violence occurring during his tenure as Johannesburg mayor. It is said that Mashaba leaves a xenophobic legacy and Mashaba may have been responsible for igniting a wave of xenophobic rhetoric in South African politics. Mashaba is reported to have attended a sensitivity program on diversity by the Human Rights Commission.

=== Support for death penalty ===
Mashaba is in support of the reintroduction of the death penalty in South Africa but only for rape and murder.

=== Authoritarian states ===
Mashaba has repeatedly expressed his admiration for Rwanda, which he has described as a "shining example of what is possible".

=== Affirmative action ===
Before becoming a politician Mashaba called for the abolition of all race-based legislation.
