= Kenny Niemach =

South African footballer

Personal information
- Full name: Kenneth Niemach
- Place of birth: South Africa
- Position: Forward

Senior career*
| Years | Team | Apps | (Gls) |
| -2000/01 | Mamelodi Sundowns F.C. | | |
| 2000/2001 | Moroka Swallows F.C. | | |
| 2001-2003 | Kaizer Chiefs F.C. | | |
| 2004 | Madura United F.C. | | |
- * Club domestic league appearances and goals

Kenny Niemach (born in South Africa) is a South African retired footballer.
