= Spectrum National Party =

Political party from South Africa

- Abbreviation: SNP
- President: Christopher Claasen
- Founder: Christopher Claasen
- Founded: 2019
- Ideology: Non-racialism; Anti-corruption
- National affiliation: Multi-Party Charter (MPC)
- National Assembly: 0 / 400
- NCOP: 0 / 90
- Provincial Legislatures: 0 / 430

Website
- www.spectrumnationalparty.co.za

The Spectrum National Party (SNP) is a South African political party founded in 2019 by Christopher Claasen, a businessman and pastor.

The party failed to garner the minimum number of signatures required by the Independent Electoral Commission and did not contest the 2024 South African general election.

== Electoral performance ==
=== Municipal elections ===
The party contested the 2021 South African municipal elections, failing to win any council seats.

Election	Votes	%
2021	5,541	0.02%

== Political beliefs ==
The party supports what it calls an "Equal Race Governance Policy", which allocates 25% representation to each of the four apartheid groupings (Blacks, Whites, Indians and Coloureds).

In August 2023, the party was one of the seven founding members of the Multi-Party Charter.
