= Michael Beaumont (South African politician) =

South African politician (born 1985)

National Chairperson of ActionSA
- Incumbent
- Assumed office 29 August 2020
- President: Herman Mashaba
- Preceded by: Party established

Personal details
- Born: Michael Eric Beaumont; 12 February 1985 (age 41) Durban, KwaZulu-Natal; South Africa
- Party: ActionSA (since 2020)
- Other political affiliations: Democratic Alliance (until 2019)
- Spouse: Terry Steenhuisen (m. 2010; div. 2010)
- Education: Michaelhouse
- Alma mater: Rhodes University

Michael Eric Beaumont (born 12 February 1985) is a South African politician and political strategist. He is the national chairperson of ActionSA, which he helped establish in 2020. Formerly a Democratic Alliance staffer, he was the chief of staff to Herman Mashaba during his term as Mayor of Johannesburg from 2016 to 2019.

== Early life and education ==
Beaumont was born on 12 February 1985. Born and raised in Durban, KwaZulu-Natal, he matriculated in 2003 at Michaelhouse. Thereafter he attended Rhodes University in the Eastern Cape, completing a bachelor's degree and Honours in politics and environmental science. He also holds a postgraduate diploma in business administration from the Wits Business School.

== Democratic Alliance: 2007–2019 ==
After graduating from Rhodes, Beaumont joined the management of the Democratic Alliance (DA), South Africa's largest opposition party. He served as the managing director of the party's KwaZulu-Natal branch and then of its Gauteng branch.

From 2016 to 2019, Beaumont was chief of staff to the Mayor of Johannesburg, DA member Herman Mashaba. He was one of Mashaba's first appointees after Mashaba's victory in the August 2016 local elections. During Mashaba's first year in office, Beaumont's government salary was increased from R1.3 million to R1.8 million per annum, and the African National Congress complained that the increase had been effected irregularly and at Beaumont's instruction, in a "flagrant abuse of power". Mashaba's spokesman denied any impropriety.

Mashaba resigned from the DA and his mayoral office in November 2019, citing disagreements with the DA's national leadership, and Beaumont resigned with him. In 2020, he published The Accidental Mayor: Herman Mashaba and the Battle for Johannesburg, a book about Mashaba's mayoral term based on Beaumont's diaries.

== ActionSA: 2020–present ==
After they left the mayoral office in November 2019, Beaumont and Mashaba co-founded the People's Dialogue, a new political platform that held consultations for the foundation of a new political party. Beaumont became its CEO. When Mashaba launched his new party, ActionSA, in August 2020, Beaumont was a founding member and the party's inaugural national chairperson. ActionSA contested its first elections in the November 2021 local elections and Beaumont became the party's "point person" in managing coalition agreements.

Beaumont has occasionally been criticised for having a tough managerial style. In March 2022, expelled party member Makhosi Khoza criticised him extensively in public statements, accusing him using "intimidation tactics" and harassment against her and other black members of the party. She said that Beaumont had driven the disciplinary process that led to her expulsion, and that the ActionSA leadership capitulated to him because it "idolises" him. In Khosa's account, Mashaba was disrespected and steered by Beaumont and strategist André Coetzee, whom she called his "white handlers"; she also accused both Beaumont and Mashaba of having "fragile and deeply bruised egos". In November 2023, ActionSA senate member Mustafa Moosa Darsot resigned from the party because of disagreements with Beaumont over the party's response to the ongoing war in Gaza.

=== 2024 general election ===
In March 2024, ActionSA announced that Beaumont would stand as one of its candidates for election to Parliament in the upcoming general election. He was named as the party's shadow minister for public enterprises and infrastructure. In that capacity, he launched what the party called its Shitty Tour, a tour of South African sewage infrastructure.

The election was held in May 2024 and ActionSA won six seats in the National Assembly. However, the party announced that Beaumont and Mashaba would not be sworn in to their parliamentary seats; instead, they would remain at party headquarters to focus on the 2026 local elections campaign.

== Personal life ==
Beaumont lives in the northern suburbs of Johannesburg. In May 2010, he married Terry Kass Beaumont, who was a media officer in his DA office in KwaZulu-Natal. Less than six months later, the DA's provincial leader, John Steenhuisen, resigned from office amid rumours that he and Kass Beaumont were having an extramarital affair. Press reported that both couples had begun divorce proceedings, and Kass Beaumont remarried to Steenhuisen in 2014.
