= Non-racialism =

South African ideology

Non-racialism, aracialism or antiracialism is a South African ideology rejecting racism and "racialism" while affirming liberal democratic ideals.

== History ==
Non-racialism became the official state policy of South Africa after April 1994, and it is enshrined in Chapter One of the Constitution of South Africa. The term has been criticised as vague, and carrying different meanings even among people sharing the same ideological tradition.

The earliest use of the term was by Karl Polanyi in the 1930s. Neville Alexander follows Robert Sobukwe in defining non-racialism as the acknowledgement of the nonexistence of race as a scientific fact. Robert Mugabe professed a belief in non-racialism in the early 1960s, but later rejected the concept and harshly criticised Nelson Mandela for his embrace of the ideology.

Non-racialism is a stated core policy of the African National Congress; however, the adoption of multiracialist policy in the Freedom Charter instead of Afrocentric, non-racialism is what resulted in the breakaway Pan Africanist Congress of Azania in 1959.

== See also ==
- Racial color blindness
- Racism in South Africa
- Affirmative action in South Africa
