= The Peoples Independent Civic Organisation =

Political party in South Africa

The Peoples Independent Civic Organisation (TPICO) is a minor political party in the West Coast District Municipality in South Africa. It had one councillor on the council of the Matzikama Local Municipality and one on the council of the Swartland Local Municipality between 2011 and 2016. In Matzikama it formed part of the governing coalition with the African National Congress and the New Generation Party until the Democratic Alliance won control of the council in 2016.
