= Africa Restoration Alliance =

Political party in South Africa

- Leader: Jerome Swartz
- Split from: African Christian Democratic Party
- National Assembly seats: 0 / 400
- Provincial Legislatures: 0 / 430
- Cape Town City Council: 2 / 231

Website
- ara-sa.org.za

The Africa Restoration Alliance (ARA) is a South African nationalist political party founded in December 2020 by the former African Christian Democratic Party (ACDP) national executive committee chairperson, Jerome Swartz. Swartz cited bribery and corruption in his former party as the reason for leaving.

In April 2021, the party protested in support of Beatrice Adams, whose child was murdered by a previously convicted rapist who had received parole. Among the party members protesting was Zephany Nurse, who was snatched from Groote Schuur Hospital when she was two days old.

In July 2021, in the runup to the 2021 South African municipal elections, the party was accused by both the ACDP and a Democratic Alliance councillor of pasting their campaign posters over boards belonging to their respective parties.

== Election results ==
=== National Assembly elections ===
| Election | Party leader | Total votes | Share of vote | Seats | +/– | Government |
|---|---|---|---|---|---|---|
| 2024 | Jerome Swartz | 11,108 | 0.07% (Note: From 2024, seats in the National Assembly are determined by a combination of the national ballot, and the nine regional ballots. Only the national ballot figures are shown here.) | 0 / 400 | New | Extra-parliamentary |

=== Provincial elections ===
| Election | Eastern Cape | | Free State | | Gauteng | | Kwazulu-Natal | | Limpopo | | Mpumalanga | | North-West | | Northern Cape | | Western Cape | |
| Election | % | Seats | % | Seats | % | Seats | % | Seats | % | Seats | % | Seats | % | Seats | % | Seats | % | Seats |
|---|---|---|---|---|---|---|---|---|---|---|---|---|---|---|---|---|---|---|
| 2024 | | | | | 0.03 | 0/80 | 0.02 | 0/80 | | | 0.02 | 0/51 | 0.06 | 0/38 | 0.12 | 0/30 | 0.42 | 0/42 |
