= Patriotic Alliance =

South African political party

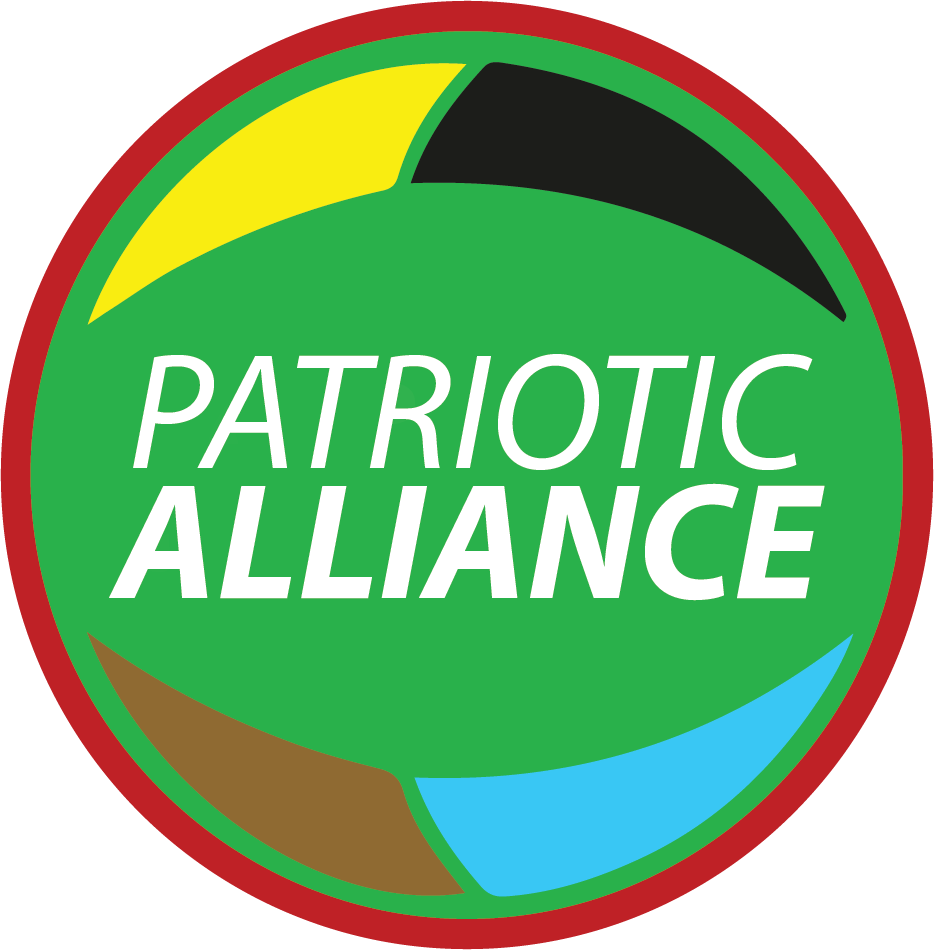
- Abbreviation: PA
- President: Gayton McKenzie
- Chairperson: Marlon Daniels
- Secretary-General: Chinelle Stevens
- Treasurer General: Anthea Leitch
- Deputy President: Kenny Kunene
- Deputy Secretary General: Meshe Habana
- Founded: 15 November 2013
- Youth wing: Patriotic Youth Alliance
- Women's wing: Patriotic Women Alliance
- Ideology: National conservatism; South African nationalism; Coloured interests; Right-wing populism; Anti-immigration
- Political position: Right-wing to far-right
- Colours: Green
- Slogan: Ons Baiza Nie
- National Assembly: 9 / 400
- NCOP: 2 / 90
- Provincial Legislatures: 10 / 487
- Cape Town City Council: 5 / 231

Website
- www.mypa.org.za

The Patriotic Alliance (PA) is a right-wing to far-right political party in South Africa, formed in November 2013 by, among others, Gayton McKenzie and Kenny Kunene. Since 2024, it is a part of the current South African government of national unity together with the African National Congress (ANC), the Democratic Alliance and other parties.

The party at its launch stated that it intended to contest the 2014 national and provincial elections in South Africa, with a particular focus on the Western Cape province, although it would also attempt to have a particular presence in the Free State, Gauteng, Northern Cape and North West. On March 12, 2013, the party paid deposit fees to the Independent Electoral Commission to contest nationally and in four provinces on May 7, 2014. The party has described itself as a credible alternative to both the Democratic Alliance (DA), which is the ruling party in the Western Cape, and the African National Congress, which governs the rest of the country. These parties have each, in turn, dismissed the PA as a credible threat and have said that in their view the party would disappear from the political landscape and not make a "significant contribution to the political discourse", which had proven to be the case with "smaller parties" in South Africa's past.

The party failed to win any seats in its first national and provincial elections in 2014, garnering just 0.07% of the national vote, with its best showing 0.4% in the Western Cape. The party had hoped to force a coalition in the Western Cape, but the DA's share of the vote in fact grew after the election.

The PA gained its first elected representatives in the 2016 municipal elections. Although the party only received 0.06% of the national vote, it picked up seats in the metropolitan municipalities of Cape Town, Nelson Mandela Bay, Johannesburg and Ekurhuleni, aided in part by the low threshold for representation in these councils. It also picked up a seat in Tokologo Local Municipality with a strong 10% of the vote.

The party made a breakthrough in the 2021 municipal elections, with big gains in the Western Cape and some wards in Gauteng. Following the elections, it held has 85 council seats throughout the country.

The PA won nine seats in the Parliament (National Assembly) with 2.06% of the vote in the 2024 general election.

In June 2024, Patriotic Alliance agreed to join the ANC-led government of national unity (GNU). The leader of the PA, Gayton McKenzie, became Minister of Sports, Arts and Culture in the new Cabinet.

== Background ==
The party's current president, McKenzie, has explained that the inspiration for the formation of the party came from his mediation, with Kunene and others, in extraordinary levels of gang violence during 2013 in the Western Cape, particularly in Manenberg.

The imminent release of Rashied Staggie, a former head of the Hard Livings gang, was in part blamed for the increase in tension and violence among gangs on the Cape Flats. This gang war had already claimed so many lives that Western Cape Premier Helen Zille had at one point asked for the army to be sent into Manenberg, though this request was turned down by national government. McKenzie has said he met with Staggie in prison ahead of the latter's release on day parole and he claims he obtained an assurance from Staggie that he would actively work to promote peace. Meetings were then arranged between the heads of all gangs and a fragile peace was established.

McKenzie has since stated that the experience left him with a belief that successive governments in the Western Cape had not done enough to eradicate the root causes of gangsterism and crime and that the only way to ensure that this could be changed would be if a new political entity was established to address this issue as well as many of the other challenges facing poor communities across South Africa.

== Party support ==
The bulk of the party's support is to be found among the coloured communities of the Gauteng and Western Cape provinces, although the party has stated that it is not a coloureds-only party and will canvass for support among all voters. In interviews, representatives have stated that the party has its roots in the coloured community and will therefore be putting political issues that affect the coloured community on the agenda. The party states that, in its opinion, no other party is catering directly for the needs of coloured voters.

At the beginning of March 2014, a founding member of the DA, Freddie Kearns, announced that he had left the DA and his job as a councillor and was joining the PA in order to grow the party in the Western Cape; he added that he was dissatisfied with the way the DA had, according to him, abandoned its coloured constituents. "The DA is just using the coloured vote, afterwards they discard our people. When the masses come in their thousands to complain to the DA, they are ignored," he said.

== Party policies ==
=== Corrections policy ===
The PA has pledged it will push for life sentences for those found guilty of corruption in government and will make random integrity testing mandatory for all public servants, especially the police.

At an event in Gauteng on 9 October 2021, McKenzie reaffirmed the party's commitment to the deportation of "illegal foreigners." McKenzie rejected claims that he was xenophobic, instead characterising himself as patriotic.

The party supports bringing back the death penalty.

=== Immigration policy ===
While on the campaign trail ahead of the 2024 general elections, McKenzie emphasised the PA's stance on immigration and promised mass deportations of "illegal foreigners," whom he has accused of selling drugs, poisonous foods and "their own medicine". He has also accused illegal immigrants of working as cheap labour and not paying tax. McKenzie also indicated his hopes for the cabinet position of Minister of Home Affairs.

=== Economic policy ===
The party has stated its belief that too many structural inequalities still dominate the South African socioeconomic landscape. The PA goes on to describe itself as economically centrist and wishes to establish state-private partnerships in key sectors and reduce the use of consultants by the state, particularly when civil service positions are staffed for such roles.

It views state funding for developing and changing the ownership patterns of the fishing industry, in favour of traditional coastal communities, as one of its key interests.

It also wants to establish and develop a state-owned bank to lend money to those who would not be able to afford the rates charged by private banks. It backs a policy of land reform that involves the state paying for land targeted for reform through a flat-rate payment system determined by government, instead of the "willing seller, willing buyer" system adopted by the ANC or the expropriation without compensation policy called for by radical parties such as the Economic Freedom Fighters. It has backed calls to improve state housing for all poor people in South Africa and wants to lower and even scrap the rents being paid to government by poor communities on the Cape Flats. Its other policies cover a wide range of issues, from improving education to prison reform, the provision of better state healthcare, wide-scale industrialisation and dealing with the country's high unemployment levels.

However, the PA's most notable policy point is the suggestion that Black Economic Empowerment be changed from a model that benefits selected black elite individuals to one that will benefit all registered voters from previously disadvantaged backgrounds. The PA proposes that a "People's Empowerment Partner" entity be established to take stakes in key industries in the country, the dividends from which would be divided among the people and paid out using a similar system to the one currently dispensing social grants. In interviews, both McKenzie and Kunene have stated that they see this as a similar approach to that adopted by successful social capitalist countries like Norway, which divide profits from the oil industry among all citizens. They have also said that once South Africa's high Gini coefficient, which measures income inequality in countries, has been lowered, the money paid to the empowerment partner could be paid to all citizens, including white South Africans. It views this intervention as essential and a long-term programme, if South Africa wishes to successfully tackle its challenge of severe inequality.

=== Foreign policy ===
In 2023, during the Gaza war, McKenzie stated the party's solidarity with Israel.

=== Other policy ===
In its 2024 election manifesto, the party endorsed conscription in the South African National Defence Force, Chapter Two of the Constitution regarding rights for women and LGBTQ people, greater integration of religion into education, and strengthening roles for traditional leaders in policy formation.

== Party structure ==
The party is controlled by three founders, Gayton McKenzie, Kenny Kunene and Charles Cilliers. The founders hold supreme authority, with additional leaders being selected, not elected.

== Controversies ==
While the party has stated that one of its key aims is the eradication of the sociopolitical and socioeconomic conditions that cause gangsterism and crime, almost all criticism and satire levelled at the PA by other political parties, the police, the South African media and the broad public has focused on the perception that the PA is a "gangster party". PA leaders have, however, countered that they have been open about their discussions with gang leaders and this group is merely one among many others that have been consulted in talks ahead of the formation of the party. Kunene has stated that the party has consulted as broadly as possible, including with religious leaders, traditional leaders, social activists, other political parties, youth groups, organised labour, civil society, intellectuals, academics and others and that calling the party an organisation exclusively for gangsters is an attempt to intimidate people into not joining the party.

On February 18, 2014, the SA Press Association (Sapa) was ordered to apologise to the party by the press ombudsman of South Africa for an article it had distributed which incorrectly stated that the Patriotic Alliance "consists of gangsters". The ombudsman, Johan Retief, found in his ruling that the Patriotic Alliance was in fact trying to eradicate gangsterism and that "although the PA is often described in the media as a party of gangsters, this should not serve as an excuse to perpetuate this description. Even the insertion of the word 'reportedly', which was edited out, would not have sufficiently rectified the matter. The danger of this kind of reporting is that, if one repeats a false statement often enough, it becomes the truth in the eyes of the public," Retief said. It was the first time in more than 20 years that Sapa had been made to apologise for any story it had distributed.

Kunene and McKenzie have in addition alleged, both at the party's launch and in interviews, that leaders from other major parties in the Western Cape have also regularly, but secretly, courted the political support of gang leaders, recognising that such individuals carry influence in communities. Despite police sources claiming that most of the 250 people who attended the pre-launch were prominent gangsters and businessmen with underworld links, and that it was being led by members of the 26s (a division within the notorious Numbers prison gang tasked with the accumulation of wealth for the rest of the gang), it has not been confirmed that anyone in the party's leadership structures is a gang member.

McKenzie and Kunene have stated they would not allow an active gang member to assume a leadership position in the party, though no South African citizen would be prevented from joining the party. Both of them have also stated that they would not assume parliamentary positions if the party were to win seats in government as one of the party's principles is having two seats of power, one group of people to build the party, another to handle government bureaucracy and governance matters and that only suitably qualified individuals would be entrusted with such roles.

The much-publicised party membership of Rashied Staggie resulted in his parole being revoked by the correctional services department, who according to the PA have claimed that his membership of the party constitutes a breach of the parole condition that he not be allowed to socialise with gangsters. The PA has publicly condemned this action against Staggie, claiming it is a violation of his constitutional right to join a political party and that Staggie had never attended any party rallies, meetings or the PA's party launch in Paarl. Staggie announced his formal withdrawal from politics in the second week of January 2014.

== Electoral debut ==
On 21 January 2014, the Independent Electoral Commission of SA announced that the Patriotic Alliance would be contesting its first by-election in a ward in Vredendal, Western Cape, primarily against the DA and the ANC. The by-election took place on Wednesday, 29 January 2014. The PA came third, with just over 23% of the overall vote.

== Election results ==
=== National elections ===
Election	Votes	Share of vote	Seats	+/–	Government
2014	13,263	0.07%	0 / 400	-	Extra-parliamentary
2019	6,660	0.04%	0 / 400	±0	Extra-parliamentary
2024	330,425	2.06% (Note: From 2024, seats in the National Assembly are determined by a combination of the national ballot, and the nine regional ballots. Only the national ballot figures are shown here.)	9 / 400	▲9	ANC–DA–IFP–PA–GOOD–PAC–VF+–UDM–RISE-ALJ coalition government

=== Provincial elections ===
Election	Eastern Cape		Free State		Gauteng		Kwazulu-Natal		Limpopo		Mpumalanga		North West		Northern Cape		Western Cape	
Election	%	Seats	%	Seats	%	Seats	%	Seats	%	Seats	%	Seats	%	Seats	%	Seats	%	Seats
2014	-	-	0.06%	0/30	0.04%	0/73	-	-	-	-	-	-	-	-	0.14%	0/30	0.40%	0/42
2019	-	-	0.56%	0/30	0.04%	0/73	-	-	-	-	-	-	0.03%	0/33	-	-	-	-
2024	2.31%	2/73	1.42%	0/30	2.03%	2/80	0.22%	0/80	-	-	0.17%	0/51	0.91%	0/38	7.80%	3/30	8.64%	3/42

In a statement following the 2014 elections, the party said that it would continue to operate and attempt to be further established by the 2016 municipal elections. It said it would contest further by-elections and also attempt to appeal to a broader section of the electorate.

On 21 June 2014, Kunene announced he would be leaving the leadership of the party but would remain on as an ordinary member. He returned to formal office in the party after 2016 as the party's deputy president.

=== Municipal elections ===
In a by-election in November 2020, the Patriotic Alliance won a ward in the City of Johannesburg from the Democratic Alliance (DA). The party won a further two by-elections in May 2021, both in the south of Johannesburg and previously held by the DA.

On 8 February 2023, the Patriotic Alliance won a by-election held in the City of Cape Town to fill a vacant seat in ward 56, making the Patriotic Alliance the only party to control a ward in the city other than the Democratic Alliance and the African National Congress, and the first to do so in more than 15 years. The party currently holds 5 of 231 seats on the Cape Town City Council.

The party has also won additional by-elections since the 2021 local government elections. One was in Johannesburg, with another two in George on separate occasions.

Election	Votes	%
2016	22,236	0.06%
2021	265,235	0.87%
2026		1.9%

== Use of open letters ==
Both McKenzie and Kunene have become known for using open letters to provoke debate, cause controversy and attract attention. Prior to him becoming a member of the Economic Freedom Fighters (EFF), Kunene wrote a scathing letter criticising President Jacob Zuma. Kunene left the EFF months after its formation before helping to launch the PA.

At the end of April 2014, just more than a week before the elections of May 7, McKenzie wrote a highly critical open letter to EFF president Julius Malema, which gained widespread attention. In the letter and in subsequent interviews, McKenzie referred to Malema as the "biggest threat facing South Africa". This was based partly on the EFF's policies on land expropriation and nationalisation. The primary criticism, however, was focused on the character of Malema himself, whom he accused of not being a real revolutionary, a "false prophet" whose promises would take South Africa to civil war and someone who had "stolen" significant amounts of public money during his political ascent. Malema dismissed the letter as predictable rhetoric prior to an election.

McKenzie had earlier written an open letter of his own to President Jacob Zuma to call on Zuma to do more to address the deaths of coloured people as a result of gang violence. This letter caused minor controversy because of McKenzie's statement that "many more young coloured men are dying every day than the white rhino". McKenzie complained that the South African government had been willing to send in the army to fight poaching, but were not willing to send the army in to combat gangsterism. The South African media interpreted this statement as a call by McKenzie to stop rhino conservation in favour of creating peace in coloured communities. McKenzie, however, explained in a subsequent column that his point had been that it was wrong for any society to prioritise the lives of animals over the lives of human beings, which he believed was happening in South Africa.

In the same open letter to Zuma, McKenzie called on the president to use the SA Cape Corps Military Veterans (SACC) to help in peace-keeping initiatives in gang-affected communities. Three weeks later PA and the SACC announced in a joint press statement that the coloured military veterans had signed an agreement to support the PA. The party said: "This association is highly significant as the SACC has 72,000 members in the Western Cape alone and hundreds of thousands more across South Africa."
