= National Heritage Council =

South African national government agency

Agency overview
- Formed: 23 April 1999; 27 years ago
- Type: Schedule 3A public entity
- Jurisdiction: Government of South Africa
- Headquarters: 2nd Floor, Building 3, Summit Place Business Park, 221 Garsfontein Road, Menlyn, Pretoria, Gauteng, South Africa
- Motto: Preserving & Promoting the Country's Heritage
- Employees: 56 (2025)
- Annual budget: R678 million (2026)
- Minister of Sport, Arts and Culture responsible: Gayton McKenzie
- Deputy Minister of Sport, Arts and Culture responsible: Peace Mabe
- Agency executive: Thabo Manetsi, CEO
- Parent department: Department of Sport, Arts and Culture (DSAC)
- Key document: National Heritage Council Act, 1999
- Website: nhc.org.za

The National Heritage Council (NHC) is the South African government agency responsible for developing, promoting, and protecting the national heritage of all the people of South Africa.

The NHC was established through the promulgation of the National Heritage Council Act, 1999, and falls under the Department of Sport, Arts and Culture (DSAC). The Act came into effect in February 2004.

== History ==
The framework for the National Heritage Council was established in 1999, via the enactment of the National Heritage Council Act, which was proclaimed for 16 February 2004. The NHC was formally launched on 28 February 2004 by the then-Minister of Arts, Culture, Science and Technology, Phumzile Mlambo-Ngcuka.

The Cultural Laws Second Amendment Act 69 of 2001 amended the NHC Act, including provisions related to the appointment of the Chairperson, dissolution of the Council, remuneration of members, and submission of business plans to the Minister. It came into operation on 18 February 2002.

During the 2010s, the NHC expanded its programs supporting heritage research, documentation, publications, and community-based projects. These funding programs focused on projects related to indigenous knowledge systems, oral history, liberation heritage, traditional practices, and the preservation of cultural resources.

In 2010, then-Minister of Arts and Culture Lulu Xingwana said that her department was working with the NHC on the development of South Africa's Resistance and Liberation Heritage Route. The NHC was appointed by the Department of Sport, Arts and Culture as the implementing agency for the program, and became involved in the nomination of sites associated with the country's liberation history for World Heritage Site status.

On 27 July 2024, the World Heritage Committee inscribed the Nelson Mandela Legacy Sites on the World Heritage List. The nomination comprised sites associated with human rights, liberation, and reconciliation, across several South African provinces. At the time, the NHC described the inscription as the culmination of more than 12 years of work on the nomination.

== Mandate ==
The National Heritage Council receives its mandate through the Constitution of South Africa, and the White Paper on Arts and Culture in Section 4 of the National Heritage Council Act, Number 11 of 1999. The agency is responsible for:

- Developing, promoting, and protecting South Africa's national heritage and culture
- Coordinating heritage management
- Protect, preserving, and promoting the content and heritage which resides in orature, so as to make it accessible and dynamic
- Integrating heritage with functions of the Council and other heritage institutions, at all levels of government
- Promoting and protecting indigenous knowledge systems, including enterprise and industry, social upliftment, institutional framework, and liberatory processes

== Funding ==
The NHC receives its funding primarily from the South African national government, through an allocation from the Department of Sport, Arts and Culture (DSAC). It also receives conditional grants for specific programs, such as the Presidential Employment Stimulus Program (PESP) and the Presidential Employment Program's Museums/Heritage-related funding.

== See also ==
- Heritage Day (South Africa)
- Culture of South Africa
- History of South Africa
- List of World Heritage Sites in South Africa
- South African Heritage Resources Agency
