= Department of Arts and Culture (South Africa) =

Department of the South African government

- List: 10 other official names: Departement van Kuns en Kultuur (Afrikaans); UmNyango wezoBukghwari namaSiko (Southern Ndebele); Isebe lezoBuchule, kunyeNkcubeko (Xhosa); umnyango wezobuCiko namaSiko (Zulu); Litiko leteBuciko neMasiko (Swazi); Kgoro ya Botaki le Khaltšharai (Northern Sotho); Lefapha la Bonono le Setso (Sotho); Kgoro e e mabapi le Botaki le Setso (Tswana); Ndzawulo ya swa Vuxongi na Mindhavuko (Tsonga); Muhasho wa zwa Vhutsila na Mvelele (Venda)
- Logo of the department

Department overview
- Jurisdiction: Government of South Africa
- Headquarters: 202 Madiba Street, Pretoria Central, Pretoria, Gauteng; 25°44′46″S 28°12′12″E
- Employees: 385 (2018)
- Ministers responsible: Nathi Mthethwa, Minister of Arts and Culture; Maggie Sotyu, Deputy Minister of Arts and Culture
- Department executive: Vusumuzi Mkhize, Director-General
- Child Department: National Archives of South Africa
- Website: www.dac.gov.za

The Department of Arts and Culture was until 2019 a department of the South African government. It was responsible for promoting, supporting, developing and protecting the arts, culture and heritage of South Africa. The heritage sites, museums and monuments of the country also resided under this ministry. The political head of the department was the Minister of Arts and Culture.

In June 2019 the department was merged with Sport and Recreation South Africa to form a new Department of Sports, Arts and Culture.

== See also ==
- Culture minister
