= Minister of Arts and Culture =

Political office in South Africa

South Africa Minister of Sport, Arts and Culture
- Flag of South Africa

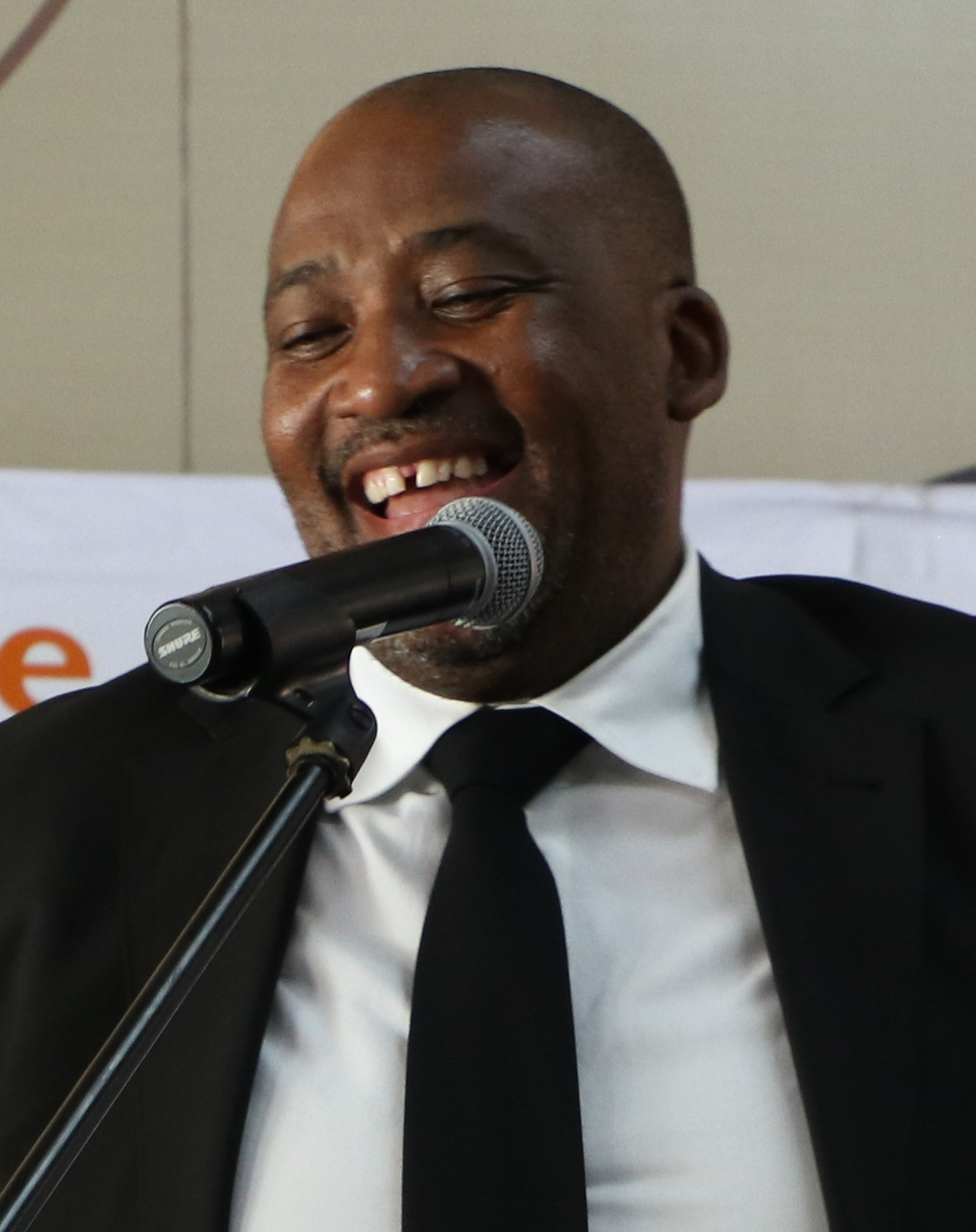
- Incumbent; Gayton McKenzie since 3 July 2024
- Department of Sport, Arts and Culture
- Style: The Honourable
- Appointer: Cyril Ramaphosa
- Inaugural holder: Pallo Jordan
- Formation: June 2019 (current form)
- Deputy: Peace Mabe
- Website: dsac.gov.za

The Minister of Sport, Arts and Culture is a minister of the Cabinet of South Africa, who is responsible for overseeing the Department of Sport, Arts and Culture. As of 3 July 2024, the incumbent Minister is Gayton McKenzie. The Deputy Minister is Peace Mabe.

== History ==
Between 1994 and 2004, the minister had a different name, as Minister of Arts, Culture, Science and Technology.

On 29 April 2004, the portfolio of Minister of Arts and Culture was created, on the appointment of President Thabo Mbeki's second cabinet. It included a separate minister of science and technology.

The ministry's current form was established in June 2019, under the second cabinet of President Cyril Ramaphosa. It marked the first time in post-democratic South Africa that the position was held by someone outside the ANC.

== Institutions ==
Apart from the Department of Arts and Culture, the following institutions also report to the minister:

- Afrikaanse Taalmuseum
- Artscape
- Freedom Park
- Iziko Museums of South Africa
- Luthuli Museum
- Market Theatre
- Natal Museum, Bloemfontein
- National Arts Council of South Africa
- National English Literary Museum
- National Film and Video Foundation
- National Heritage Council
- National Library of South Africa
- National Museum
- Northern Flagship Institutions
- Nelson Mandela Museum
- Performing Arts Council of the Free State
- The Playhouse Company
- Robben Island Museum
- South African Geographical Names Council
- South African Heritage Resources Agency
- South African Library for the Blind
- State Theatre (South Africa)
- Windybrow Centre for the Arts
- Ncome Museum
- Anglo-Boer War Museum
- William Humphreys Art Gallery

== List of past ministers ==
=== Education, arts and science, 1949–1989 ===
Name	Portrait	Term		Party	Prime Minister
J.H. Viljoen		1949	16 April 1958	NP	D.F. Malan (I) (II)
J.J. Serfontein		16 April 1958	8 October 1961	NP	Hans Strydom (I)
J.J. Serfontein		16 April 1958	8 October 1961	NP	Hendrik Verwoerd (takes office after Strydom's death)
		8 October 1961	1970	NP	Hendrik Verwoerd (I) (II)
		8 October 1961	1970	NP	B.J. Vorster (takes office after Verwoerd's death)
		1970	1981	NP	B.J. Vorster (I) (II) (III)
		1981	1989	NP	P.W. Botha (I) (II)

=== Education and culture, 1989–1994 ===
Name	Portrait	Term		Party	Prime Minister
Piet Clase		1989	1991	NP	F.W. de Klerk (I)
Piet Marais		1991	10 May 1994	NP	F.W. de Klerk (I)

=== Arts, culture, science and technology, 1994–2004 ===
Name	Portrait	Term		Party	President
Ben Ngubane		11 May 1994	31 August 1996	ANC	Nelson Mandela (Government of National Unity)
Ben Ngubane		17 June 1999	29 April 2004	ANC	Thabo Mbeki (I)

=== Arts and culture, 2004–2023 ===
Name	Portrait	Term		Party	President
Pallo Jordan		29 April 2004	22 April 2009	ANC	Thabo Mbeki (II)
Pallo Jordan		29 April 2004	22 April 2009	ANC	Kgalema Motlanthe (takes office after Mbeki resigns)
Lulama Xingwana		22 April 2009	30 October 2010	ANC	Jacob Zuma (I) (II) Cyril Ramaphosa (I) (II)
Paul Mashatile		30 October 2010	7 May 2014	ANC	Jacob Zuma (I) (II) Cyril Ramaphosa (I) (II)
Nathi Mthethwa		24 May 2014	30 May 2019	ANC	Jacob Zuma (I) (II) Cyril Ramaphosa (I) (II)

=== Sport, arts and culture, 2024–present ===
Name	Portrait	Term		Party	President
Nathi Mthethwa		30 May 2019	6 March 2023	ANC	Cyril Ramaphosa (II)
Gayton Mackenzie		3 July 2024	Incumbent	PA	Cyril Ramaphosa (III) (took office after the formation of the coalition Government of National Unity)

== See also ==
- Department of Sport, Arts and Culture
- Government of South Africa
- Culture of South Africa
- South African art
- Sport in South Africa
