= Anikki Maswanganye =

Anikki Maswanganye is a South African musician and the first female South African drummer of the early 1970's.

At the age of 9, Maswanganye became concerned about the plight of South African women in the arts. She worked to bridge the inequity and occupy spaces where men predominated. In 1998, she founded an all-female band, Ladies In Jazz.

Maswanganye continued to scout talent, and decided to create a programme where women could gather and discuss issues. She also worked with artists Mama Dorothy and Mama Abigail to start The Women in Song Legacy Tour.
