= South African National Boxing Organisation =

- Sport: Amateur boxing
- Jurisdiction: South Africa
- Abbreviation: SANABO
- Founded: 2012
- Affiliation: AIBA
- Regional affiliation: African Boxing Confederation (AFBC)
- President: Andile Mofu
- Secretary: Pretty Tsotetsi

Official website
- www.sanabo.org

South African National Boxing Organisation (SANABO) is the organisation that governs boxing (or olympic style boxing) for men and women in South Africa. South African National Boxing Organisation is affiliated to the International Boxing Association (AIBA), along with the African Boxing Confederation (AFBC). SANABO is also affiliated to the South African Sports Confederation and Olympic Committee (SASCOC), and Sport and Recreation South Africa (SRSA). It organises national competitions such as the SANABO Elite National Championships and the SANABO Boxing League.

SANABO competes in the subregional Zone Four Boxing Championships under the auspices of AFBC, in which 14 member countries of the Southern African Development Community (SADEC) participates. SANABO oversees all the nine South African provincial affiliates. Under the provincial affiliates are the districts and then the municipal boxing clubs in the governance structure. Boxing South Africa (BSA) is the organisation responsible for professional boxing in South Africa. SANABO aims to be one of the top leading olympic style boxing nations in Africa and to be ranked among the top 12 leading boxing nations affiliated to the world governing body AIBA.

== Affiliate Members ==
This is a list of provincial affiliated members of SANABO, according to its constitution.

- Eastern Cape Boxing Organisation
- Free State Boxing Organisation
- Gauteng Boxing Organisation
- Kwazulu Natal Boxing Organisation
- Limpopo Boxing Organisation
- Mpumalanga Boxing Organisation
- Northern Cape Province Boxing Organisation
- North West Province Boxing Organisation
- Western Cape Boxing Organisation

== Associate Members ==
This is a list of associate members of SANABO.

- University Sport South Africa – Boxing (USSA-Boxing)

== See also ==
- Sport in South Africa
