= Heidedal =

Suburb in Bloemfontein, South Africa

Heidedal Heidedal Die Dal (The Dal)
- Location within Free State (South African province) Location within South Africa
- Coordinates: 29.1353°S 26.2465°E
- Country: South Africa
- Province: Free State
- Municipality: Mangaung
- Main Place: Bloemfontein

Area
  - Total: 2.79 km^{2} (1.08 sq mi)

Population (2011)
  - Total: 9,605
  - Density: 3,440/km^{2} (8,920/sq mi)

Racial makeup (2011)
  - Black African: 16.5%
  - Coloured: 81.5%
  - Indian/Asian: 0.7%
  - White: 0.6%
  - Other: 0.8%

First languages (2011)
  - Afrikaans: 88.1%
  - English: 4.0%
  - Sotho: 3.7%
  - Tswana: 2.2%
  - Other: 2.0%
- Time zone: UTC+2 (SAST)
- Postal code (street): 9301
- PO box: 9306

Heidedal is a suburb of the city of Bloemfontein in South Africa.

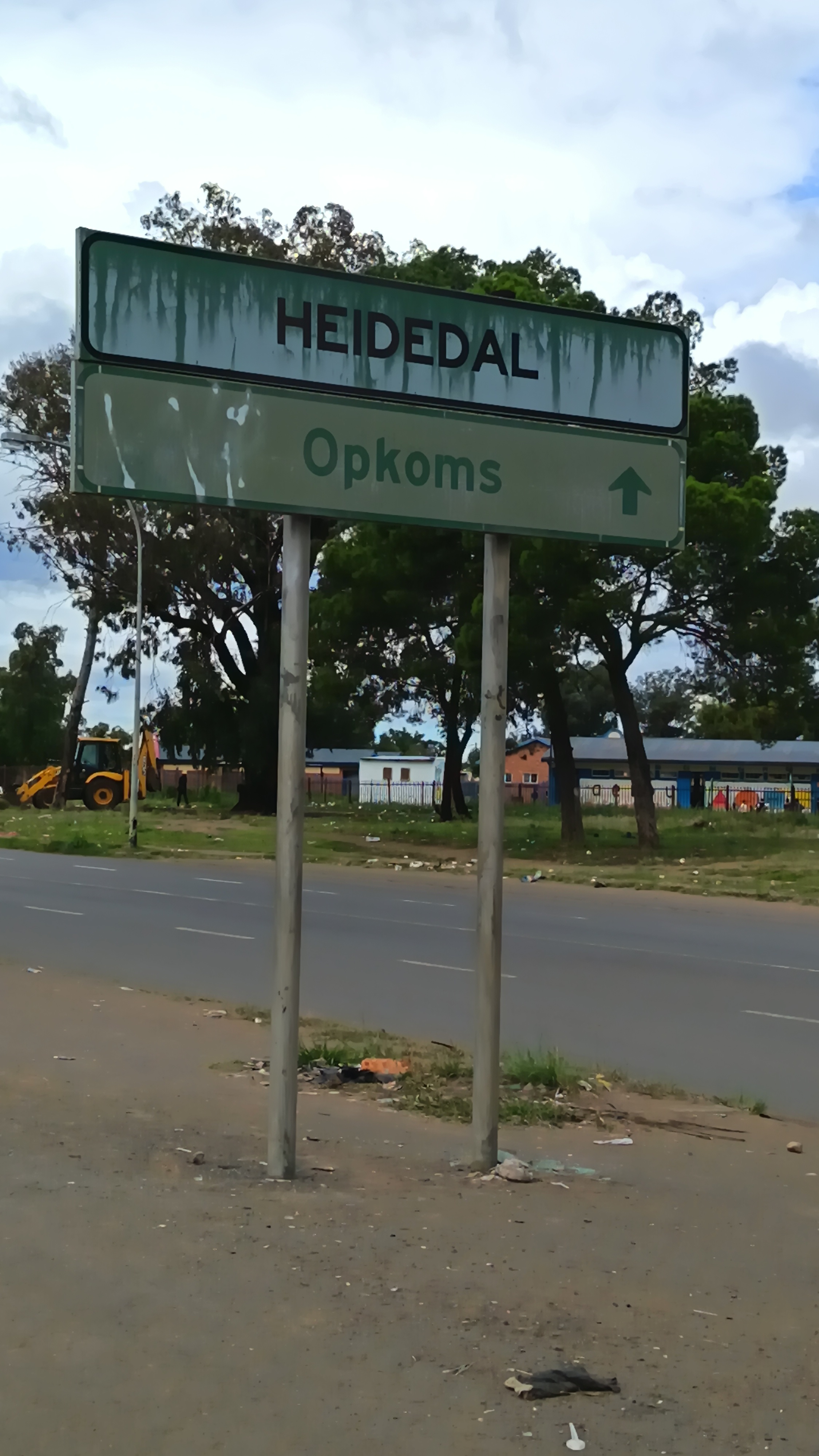
Heidedal, Bloemfontein

== Education ==
Hededail has 4 primary schools and 3 secondary schools which use Afrikaans as their home language.

- Petunia Secondary School
- Heatherdale Secondary School
- Dr. Blok Secondary School
- Heide Primary School
- Joe Solomon Primary School
- Olympia Primary School
- Credence Primary School

== Recreation ==
- Clive Solomon Stadium - Rugby, Football, Netball, Cricket.
- Billy Murison Stadium - Football, Athletics, Tennis.
- Heidedal Public Swimming Pool

== Religion ==
Heidedal has a diverse Christian population, and a Muslim population of note.

=== Christian denominations ===
- Uniting Reformed Church of Southern Africa - Heidedal South
- Heidedal Methodist Church
- Anglican Church - Heidedal Parish
- Uniting Reformed Church of Southern Africa - Heatherdale
- Roman Catholic Church in South Africa - Heidedal Parish
- Apostolic Faith Mission
- Evangelical Lutheran Church - Heidedal

=== Islam ===
- Miftahuddin Islamic Institute Masjid

== Sports ==
=== Football ===
- Heidedal United FC
- Bubchu United FC
- Kingston FC
- Manshaft FC

=== Rugby ===
- Bloemfontein Crusaders Rugby Club

== Shopping ==
- Heidedal Twin City Mall
- Lemo Mall

== Notable people ==
- Gayton McKenzie, South African businessman and politician.
