= South African Geographical Names Council =

Geographical names advisory body

Agency overview
- Formed: 20 November 1998; 28 years ago
- Jurisdiction: South Africa
- Headquarters: Sechaba House, 202 corner Madiba & Paul Kruger Street, Pretoria
- Parent department: Department of Sports, Arts and Culture
- Key document: https://www.gov.za/sites/default/files/gcis_document/201409/a118-98.pdf
- Website: https://www.sagns.gov.za/

The South African Geographical Names Council (SAGNC) is the official government body of South Africa that advises the executive branch of the central government (in the form of the Minister of Arts and Culture) on new geographical names as well as the changing of existing geographical names. The Council also receives recommendations from provincial geographical names committees, such as the Western Cape Provincial Geographical Names Committee.

The new Council in the 1998 law replaced the previous "National Place Names Committee of South Africa".

== Purpose of the Council ==
The Council was established by the South African Geographical Names Council Act 118 of 1998. The purpose of the act, according to its preamble, is: "To establish a permanent advisory body known as the South African Geographical Names Council to advise the Minister responsible for Arts and Culture on the transformation and standardisation of geographical names in South Africa for official purposes; to determine its objects, functions and methods of work; and to provide for matters connected therewith."

A "geographical name" is defined as any terrestrial feature within the territorial limits of the Republic of South Africa, together with any that fall under the jurisdiction of the Republic as acquired by treaty, regardless of whether the feature is natural or made or adapted by human agency, or whether it is populated or unpopulated.

The Council is tasked with providing both the name of each geographical feature and the written form of that name.

== Composition of the Council ==
The Council must consist of no fewer than fifteen and no more than twenty-five members appointed by the Minister of Arts and Culture, of whom:

1. One must be nominated by each of the nine South African provinces.
2. One must be nominated by each of the following:
  1. The South African Post Office.
  2. The Chief Directorate: National Geo-spatial Information.
  3. The Pan South African Language Board.

The other members of the board must be appointed according to their special competence, experience and interest in the relevant fields and taking into account the linguistic, cultural and demographic characteristics of the population of South Africa.

A member of the Council is appointed for a period of three years and may then be reappointed for a further period of three years.

The Council may meet as often as necessary, but at least three times a year. The 2001 amendment to the law, provided that "The Minister may dissolve the Council on any reasonable grounds."

== Final approval or rejection of a name ==
The Minister of Arts and Culture of South Africa has the final power to approve or reject a geographical name recommended by the Geographical Names Council. Any approval or rejection must be published in the South African Government Gazette before it takes effect. However, any person or body dissatisfied with a geographical name approved by the Minister may lodge an appeal against it.

== New names and changes ==
The first couple of years work by the Council was in establishing a new national place names database. The first new names were published in the Gazette in September 2000. In October 2010, SAGNC published a list of all of the new names and name changes that had been recommended by them and approved by the Minister of Arts and Culture through January 2010.

=== South African Geographical Names Service ID ===
The ID associates all unique places with an official name, description and exact coordinates. This ID is used in databases like OpenStreetMap.

== See also ==
- Renaming in South Africa

== Sources ==
The above article contains extracts from the "South African Geographical Names Council Act 118 of 1998" (PDF)., as amended by the "Cultural Laws Amendment Act, Number 36 of 2001" (PDF).
