= Knysna fine art =

Knysna Fine Art is a commercial art gallery in Knysna, in the Western Cape Province of South Africa.

== History ==
Knysna Fine Art was founded in 1998 by its owner, Trent Read, who set up the gallery in a converted woodworker's workshop. In 2010 it moved into its current premises in the historic Thesen House (originally the headquarters of Thesen & Co., wood merchants, and Thesen Steamship Co.), where it now occupies 900 square metres (9,687 square foot) of exhibition space.

It is considered one of the top contemporary galleries in South Africa.

== Services ==
Read, who is considered one of the foremost authorities on contemporary South African art, and gallery curator Corlie de Kock act as consultants to museums, corporations, and private collectors on collecting and displaying art, and to architects on exhibition space design.
