= National Arts Council of South Africa =

South African national government agency

Agency overview
- Formed: 1997; 29 years ago
- Type: National public entity
- Jurisdiction: Government of South Africa
- Status: Active
- Headquarters: 66 Margaret Mcingana Street, Newtown, Johannesburg, Gauteng, South Africa
- Employees: 45 (2025)
- Annual budget: R120.9 million (2024/25)
- Minister responsible: Gayton McKenzie, Minister of Sport, Arts and Culture
- Deputy Minister responsible: Peace Mabe, Deputy Minister of Sport, Arts and Culture
- Agency executives: Lebogang Mogoera, Acting CEO and Accounting Authority; Reshma Bhoola, Interim CFO
- Parent department: Department of Sport, Arts and Culture
- Key document: National Arts Council Act, 1997
- Website: nac.org.za

The National Arts Council of South Africa (NAC) is the official arts council for the Republic of South Africa. The NAC was established in 1997 by an act of the South African Parliament (Act No. 56 of 1977). The NAC is one of the main funding bodies for South African artists.

The Council provides grants and strategic support to artists, arts organisations, festivals and cultural institutions across South Africa. It aims to increase access to the arts, preserve cultural heritage through artistic practice, and contribute to the country's creative economy.

== History ==
The National Arts Council was established in 1997 following the enactment of the National Arts Council Act. The creation of the Council formed part of South Africa's post-apartheid transformation of arts and culture institutions, replacing fragmented funding systems with a national body intended to support artistic excellence and equitable access to funding.

Since its establishment, the Council has funded thousands of projects spanning visual arts, music, dance, theatre, literature, crafts, multidisciplinary arts, and indigenous artistic practices.

== Controversies ==
The National Arts Council spent R6 million rand fighting to keep Tshepo Mashiane out of work for the past 2 years.

In May 2026, Sports, Arts and Culture Minister Gayton McKenzie dessolved the council and was taken to court by the members.

In July 2026 the Gauteng High Court suspended the decision the minister he was ordered the reinstatement of the board as well as covering the costs of the case.
