= Department of Sport, Arts and Culture =

South African government department

Department overview
- Jurisdiction: Government of South Africa
- Annual budget: R6.1 billion (2023/24)
- Ministers responsible: Gayton McKenzie, Minister of Sport, Arts and Culture; Peace Mabe, Deputy Minister of Sport, Arts and Culture
- Child agencies: National Archives and Records Service of South Africa; National Arts Council of South Africa
- Website: dsac.gov.za

The Department of Sport, Arts and Culture (DSAC) is a department of the Government of South Africa with responsibility for sport, the arts, culture, and heritage. It was created in June 2019 by the merger of the Department of Arts and Culture with Sport and Recreation South Africa.

As of 2024 the Sport, Arts and Culture Minister was Gayton McKenzie.

== History ==
DSAC and its predecessors provided more than R 70 million for the maintenance of Liliesleaf Farm, a national heritage site of great significance to the history of the African National Congress and the liberation struggle against apartheid, from 2008 until 2021. At that time the museum was owned and run by the Liliesleaf Trust, headed by founder and CEO Nicolas Wolpe.

After a dispute about funding, Mthethwa said that a process had begun towards declaring Liliesleaf Museum "as a cultural institution in accordance with the Cultural Institutions Act". This would enable Parliament to oversee the museum.

== See also ==
- Culture of South Africa
- National Heritage Council
- Minister of Sport, Arts and Culture
- Government of South Africa
