= Sport and Recreation South Africa =

Government department, to 2019

- List: 10 other official names: Departement van Sport en Ontspanning (Afrikaans); umNyango wezemiDlalo nokuziThabisa (Southern Ndebele); iSebe lezeMidlalo noLonwabo (Xhosa); uMnyango Wezemidlalo Nokungcebeleka (Zulu); Litiko Letemidlalo Nekukhibika (Swazi); Kgoro ya Dipapadi le Boitapološo (Northern Sotho); Lefapha la Dipapadi le Boikgathollo (Sotho); Lefapha la Metshameko le Boitapoloso (Tswana); Ndzawulo ya Mintlangu na Vuhungasi (Tsonga); Muhasho wa zwa Mitambo na Vhuḓimvumvusi (Venda)

Department overview
- Type: Department
- Headquarters: Regent Building, c/o Vermeulen & Queen St, Pretoria
- Minister responsible: Nathi Mthethwa, Minister of Sport and Recreation
- Deputy Minister responsible: Nocawe Mafu, Deputy Minister of Sport and Recreation
- Department executive: Alec Moemi, Director-General: Sport and Recreation
- Website: www.srsa.gov.za

Sport and Recreation South Africa (SRSA), also known as the Department of Sport and Recreation, was until 2019 the department of the Government of South Africa responsible for sport in South Africa. In June 2019 it was merged with the Department of Arts and Culture to form a new Department of Sports, Arts and Culture.
