= Süd-Afrikanischer Volkskalender =

History of German language almanacs published in South Africa 1887-1913

The Süd-Afrikanischer Volks-Kalender (English: South African [German] Peoples Year Book) was a series of Almanacs published by Hermann Michaelis (born in Rendsburg, Germany 1855, died Johannesburg, South Africa 1913.) between 1887 and 1913. The almanacs contain information on the German community in South Africa at the time and have been described as a rich resource for historians and genealogists.

The almanac was originally authored by George Wilhelm Wagener, pastor of the St Martini German Evangelical Lutheran Church.

The original aim of the almanac was to help new German immigrants acclimatize to South Africa and gave advice on how to adapt to the Southern Hemisphere seasons. The almanacs were originally published by Hermann Michaelis Publishers and German Book dealers based in Cape Town. From 1912 Herman Michaelis authored the almanacs himself from his publishing company which had relocated to Johannesburg.

At least 4 editions were published:

- Deutscher Volkskalender für Südafrika auf das Jahr 1887. Authored by G.W Wagener. The almanac was 287 pages long and contained entries and advertisements as well as some half tone illustrations and a portrait of Kaiser Wilhelm I. It also contained a list of names of Germans living in Cape Town in 1886. A Full text version of the Almanac is available from Internet Archive.

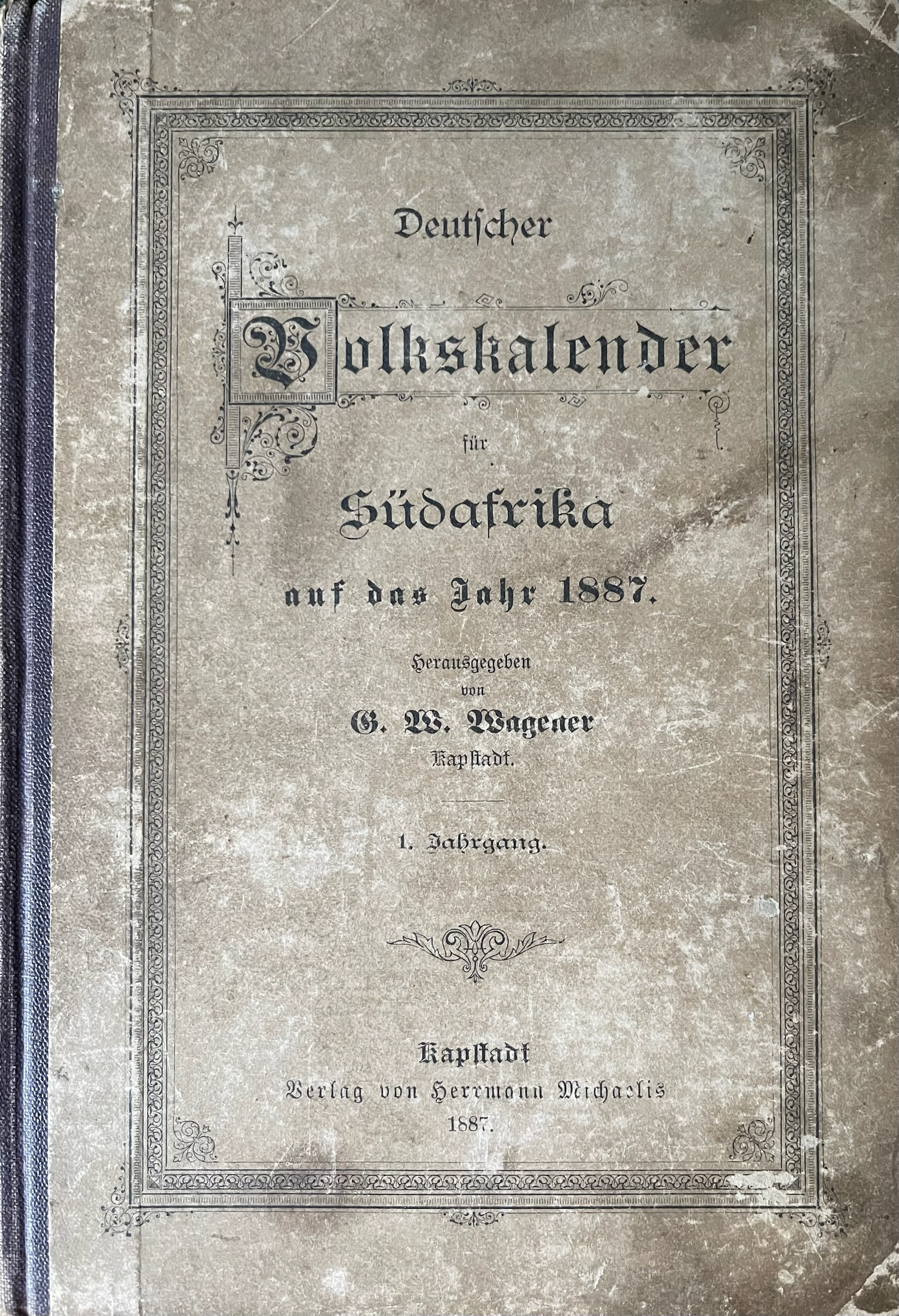
Front cover of Süd Afrikanischer Volks Kalender 1887

- Deutscher Volkskalender für Südafrika auf das Jahr 1888. Authored by G.W. Wagener. Few details are available about this edition but it is referenced by Rabe.
- Süd-Afrikanischer Volks-Kalender 1912. Authored by Hermann Michaelis. The first edition was almost 400 pages long.

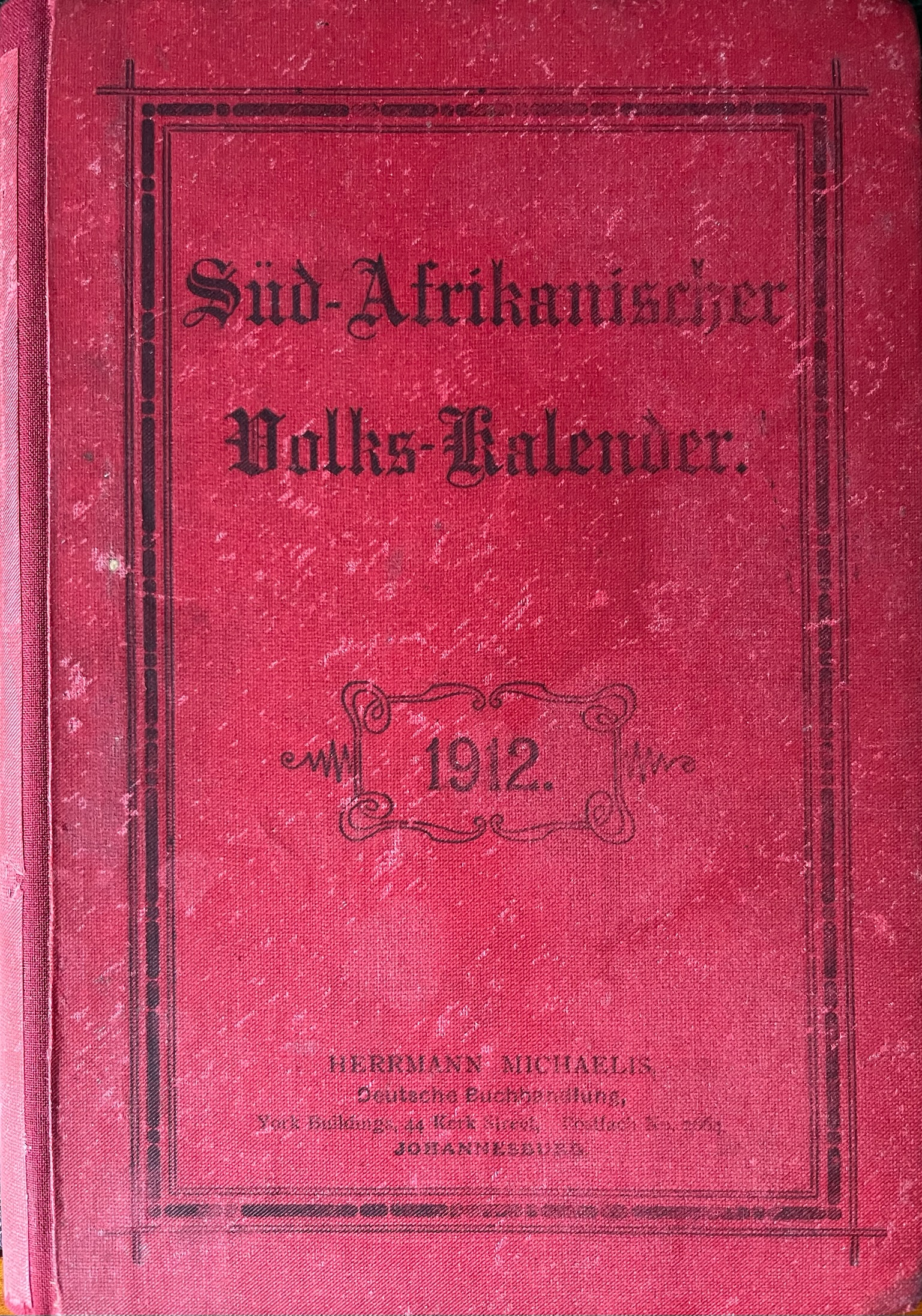
Front cover of Süd Afrikanischer Volks Kalender 1912

- Illustrierter Süd-Afrikanischer Volks-Kalender 1913. Authored by Hermann Michaelis. The second edition was enlarged by almost 100 pages.

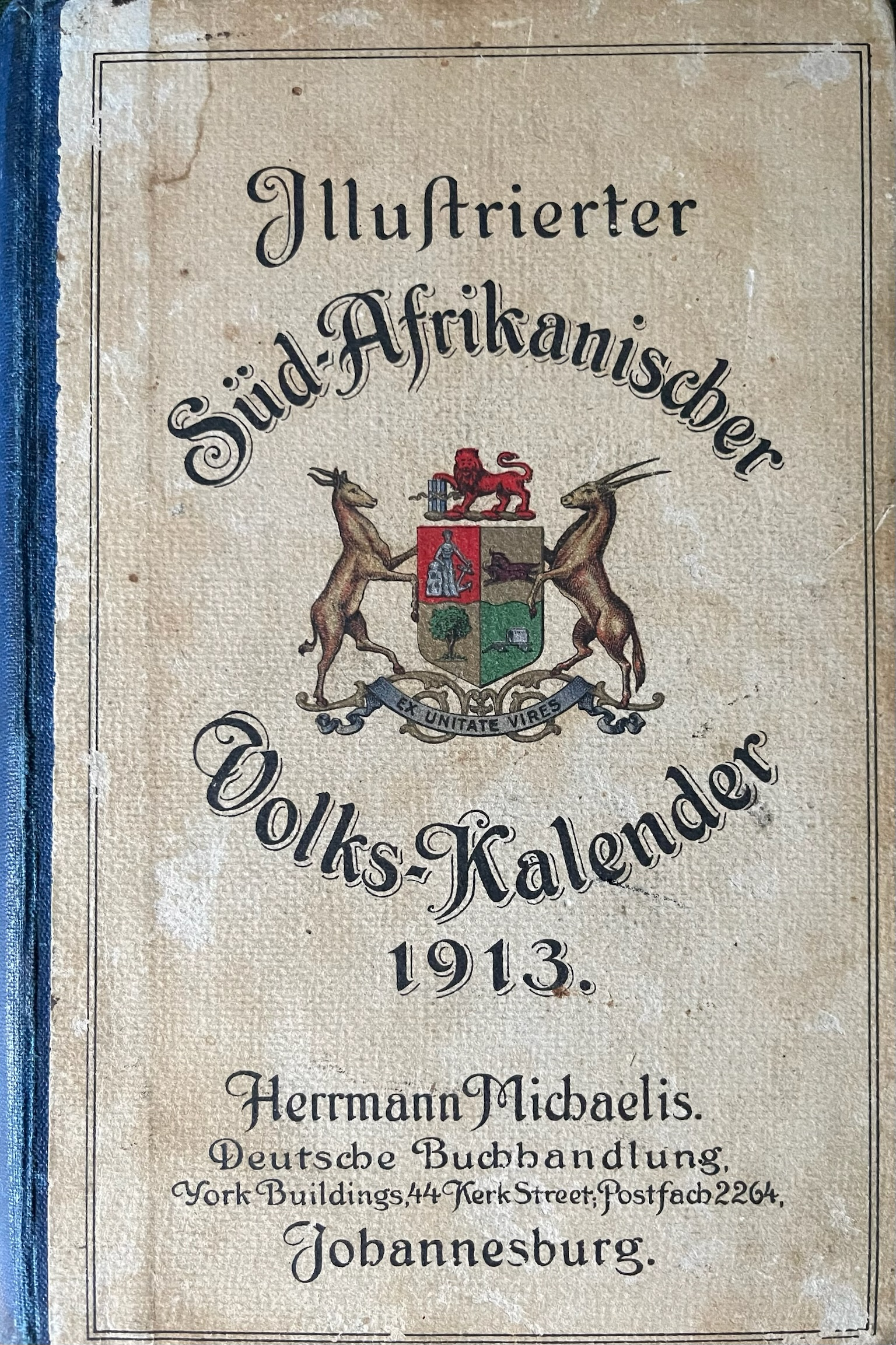
Front cover of Süd Afrikanischer Volks Kalender 1913

There were plans for a 1914 edition but this never materialised. Possible reasons for the discontinuation of the almanac include the death of Hermann Michaelis (died by cyanide poisoning on 18 November 1913) and the outbreak of World War I in 1914.

The almanac was succeeded by the Afrikanischer Heimatkalender ('African Home Calendar') which was published from 1930 to 2009 by the Federal Council of Churches of the German Federation of Churches in South and Southwest Africa.
