= Evangelical Lutheran Church in Southern Africa (Cape Church) =

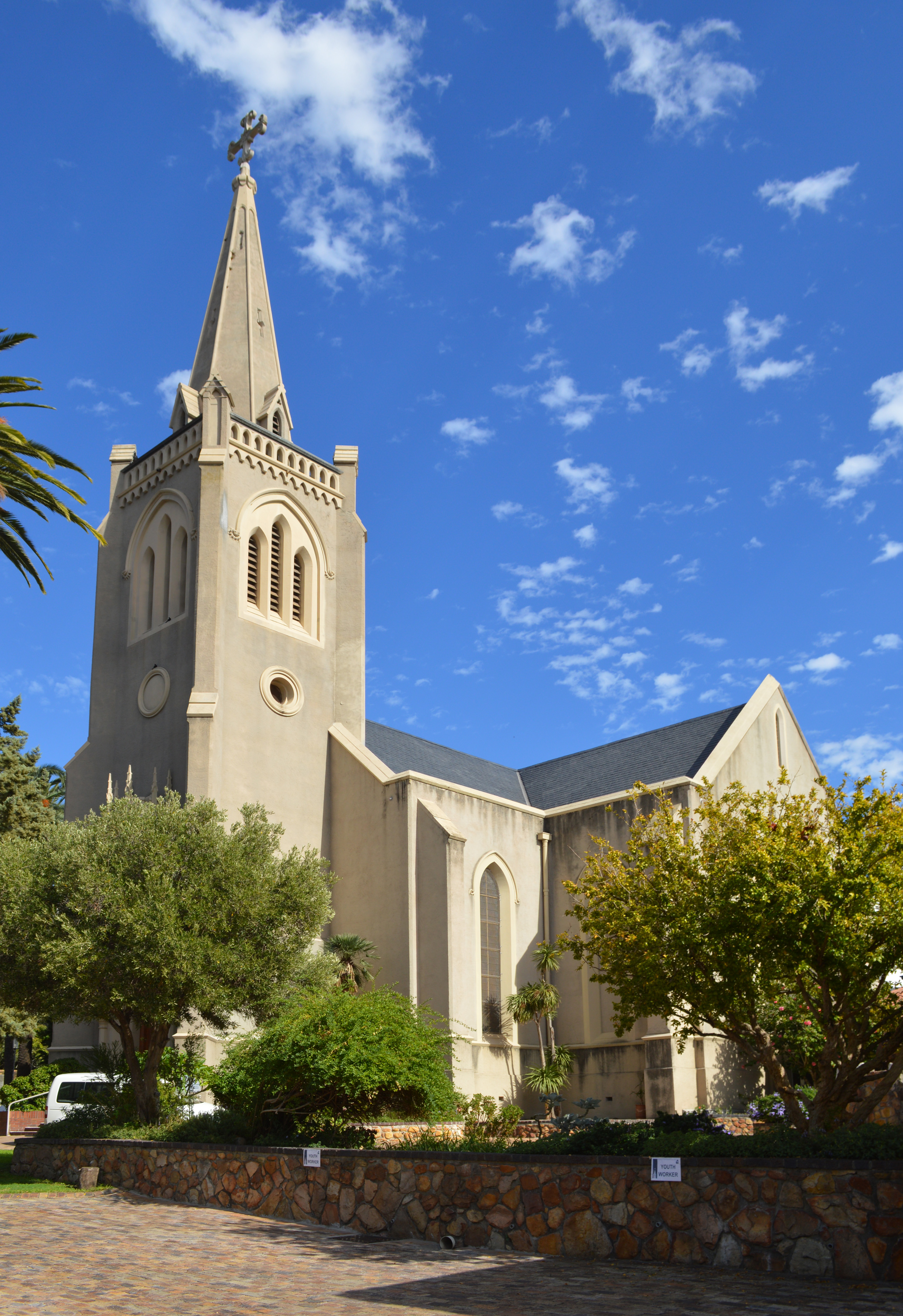
The St. Martini Lutheran Church in Cape Town.

The Evangelical Lutheran Church in Southern Africa (Cape Church) is a Lutheran church in some of the Western Provinces of South Africa. The Cape Church is a member of the Lutheran World Federation. It has 4,223 baptized members.

== History ==
By 1741, 509 Lutherans were living in Cape Town and in 1742 petitions were sent to the Dutch East India Company to allow a Lutheran church to be built. The Dutch East India Company initially refused but finally relented and gave permission for a church on 23 October 1779. The church at its inception had 441 founding parishioners.

== Early Pastors ==
This list is incomplete. The years of service, where known, are indicated in brackets.

- A.L. Kolver (1780-1789). The first Lutheran Pastor of the church.
- C.H.F. Hesse (1801- 1816)
- F Kaufmann
- K van Staveren
- J.G. Stegman (1836)
- C.A. Bamberger
- L. Parisius (1851-1872)
- Dr Hugo Hahn (1873-1884)
- G.W. Wagener (1893-1920). Long serving pastor who authored the Süd Afrikanischer Volks Kalender from 1887-1890.
- Pastor Von Propst (1922-1927)
- Pastor Hoberg (1928-1954)
