= Culture of South Africa =

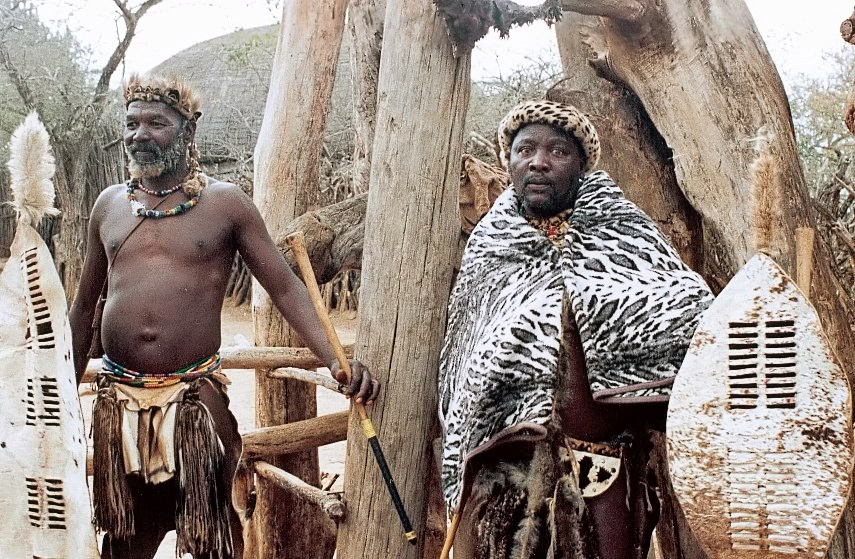
Zulus in Natal

South Africa is known for its ethnic and cultural diversity. Almost all South Africans speak English to some degree of proficiency, in addition to their native language, with English acting as a lingua franca in commerce, education, and government. South Africa has twelve official languages, but other indigenous languages are spoken by smaller groups, chiefly Khoisan languages.

Members of the middle class, who are predominantly white and Indian but whose ranks include growing numbers of other groups, have lifestyles similar in many respects to that of people found in Western Europe, North America, Australia and New Zealand.

The Apartheid state legally classified South Africans into one of four race groups, determined where they could live, and enforced segregation in education, work opportunities, public amenities, and social relations. Although these laws were abolished by the early 1990s, the apartheid racial categories remain ingrained in South African culture, with South Africans continuing to classify themselves, and each other, as belonging to one of the four defined race groups, such as Blacks, Whites, Coloureds, and Indians, making it difficult to define a single South African culture that does not refer to these racial categories.

The promotion, preservation, and development of national heritage and culture in South Africa is part of the mandate of the National Heritage Council, while the preservation of heritage resources is the responsibility of the South African Heritage Resources Agency. Both government agencies are part of the Department of Sport, Arts and Culture.

== Art ==
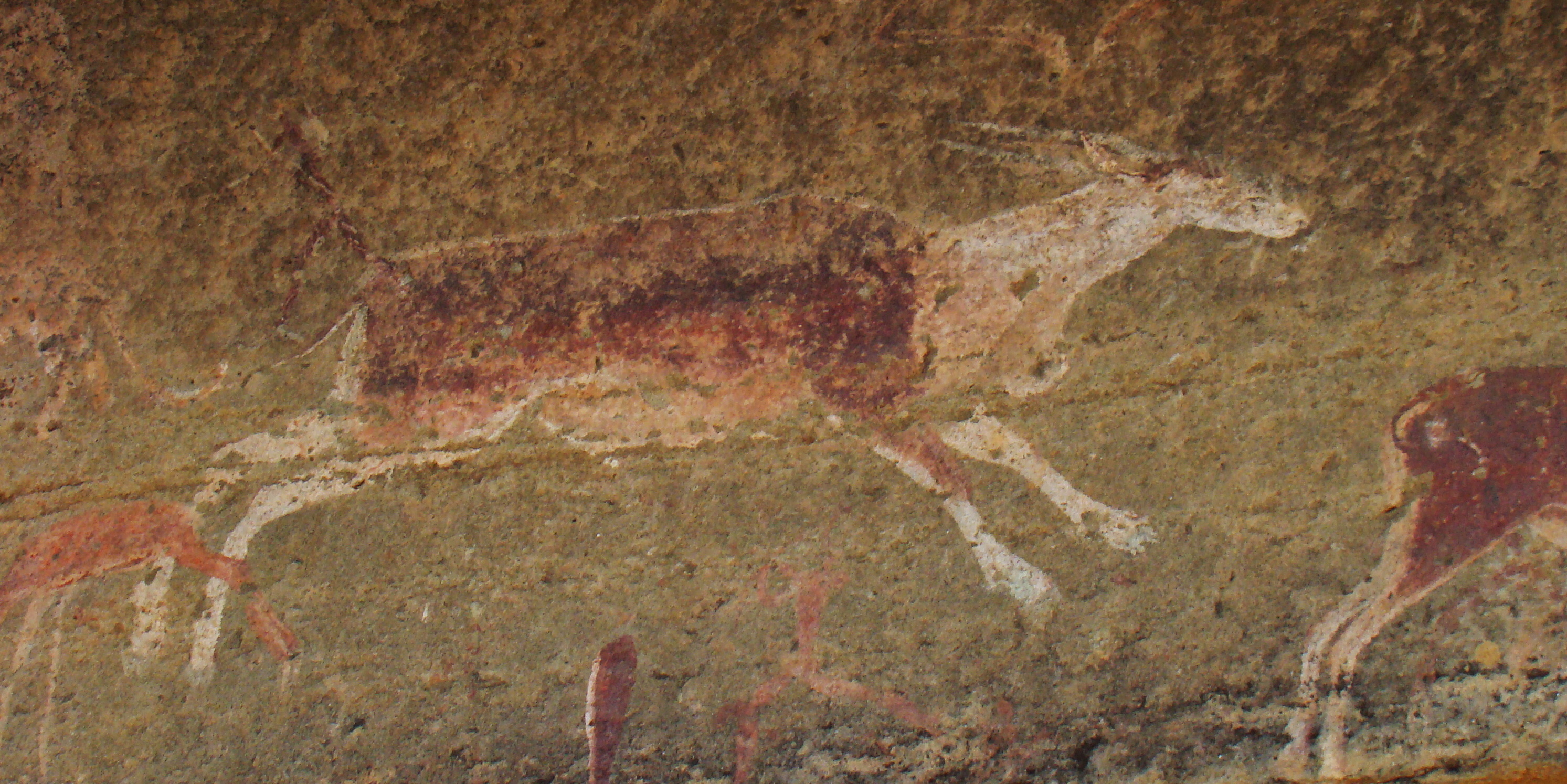
Eland, rock painting, Drakensberg, South Africa

The oldest art objects in the world were discovered in a South African cave. Dating from 75,000 years ago, these small drilled snail shells could have no other function than to have been strung on a string as a necklace. South Africa was one of the cradles of the human species. One of the defining characteristics of the human species is the creation of art (from Latin "ars", meaning worked or formed from basic material).

The scattered tribes of Khoisan peoples moving into South Africa from around 10,000 BC had their own distinct art styles, evident today in numerous cave paintings. They were superseded by the Bantu and Nguni peoples, which developed their own vocabularies of art forms. In the 20th century, traditional tribal forms of art were scattered and re-melded by the divisive policies of apartheid.

New forms of art emerged in the mines and townships: a dynamic art using materials ranging from plastic strips to bicycle spokes. The Dutch-influenced folk art of the Afrikaner Trekboer and the urban white artists earnestly following changing European traditions from the 1850s onwards also contributed to this eclectic mix, which continues to evolve today.

One form of art developed during the apartheid period. This new characterisation was termed "township art" and became common in the 1960s and 1970s. This art style tended to depict scenes from the everyday life of poor black individuals in South Africa. Common visual elements in this art style are dilapidated houses, women washing clothes, penny whistlers, and black mother-and-child tableaux.

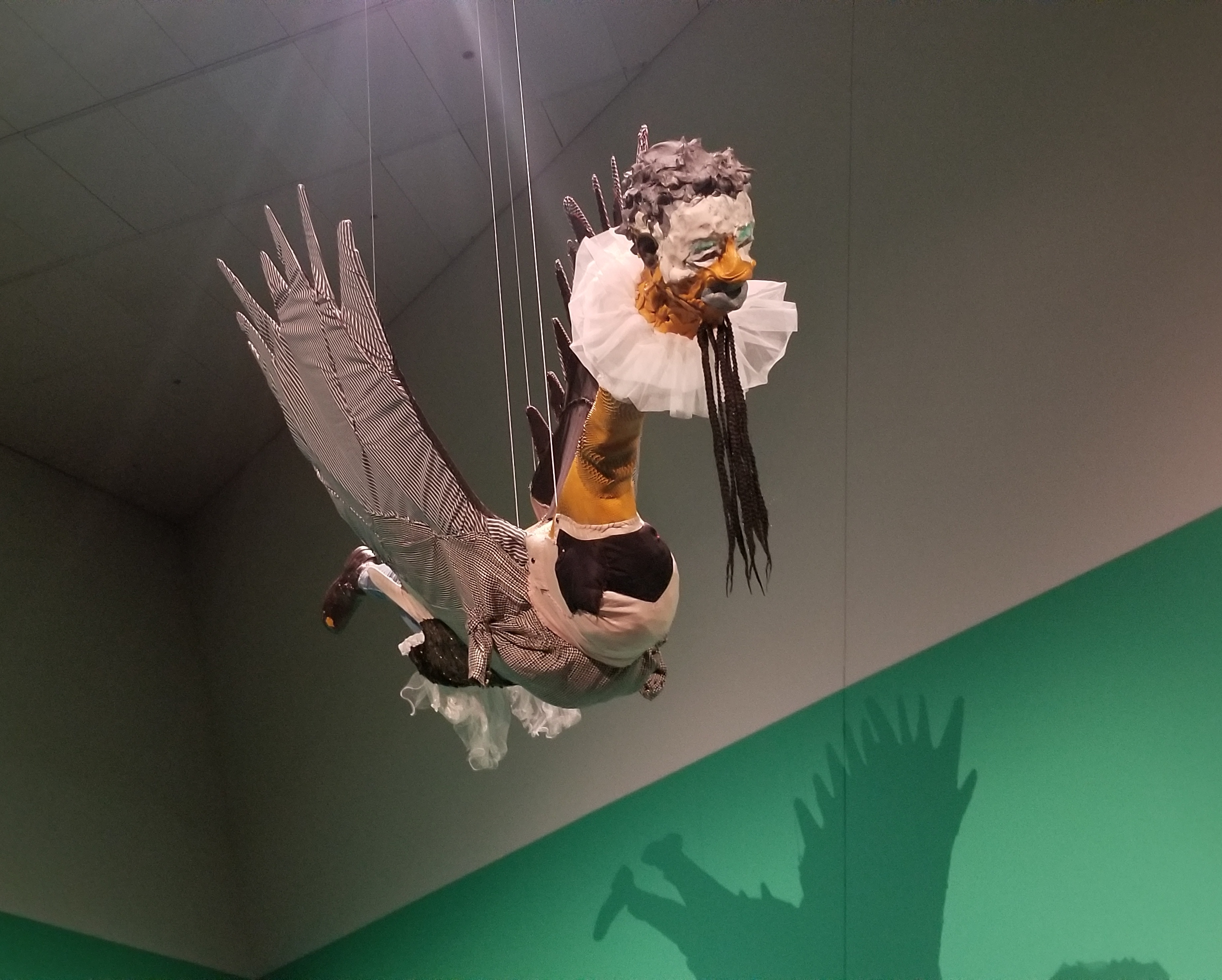
Oracles of the Pink Universe by Simphiwe Ndzube, 2021

Contemporary South Africa has a vibrant art scene, with artists receiving international recognition. The recent "Figures and Fictions" exhibition of South African photography at the Victoria and Albert Museum in London included the work of Mikhael Subotzky, Zanele Muholi, David Goldblatt, Zwelethu Mthethwa, and Guy Tillim. Contemporary South African artists whose work has been met with international acclaim include Marlene Dumas, William Kentridge, and John Smith.

== Architecture ==
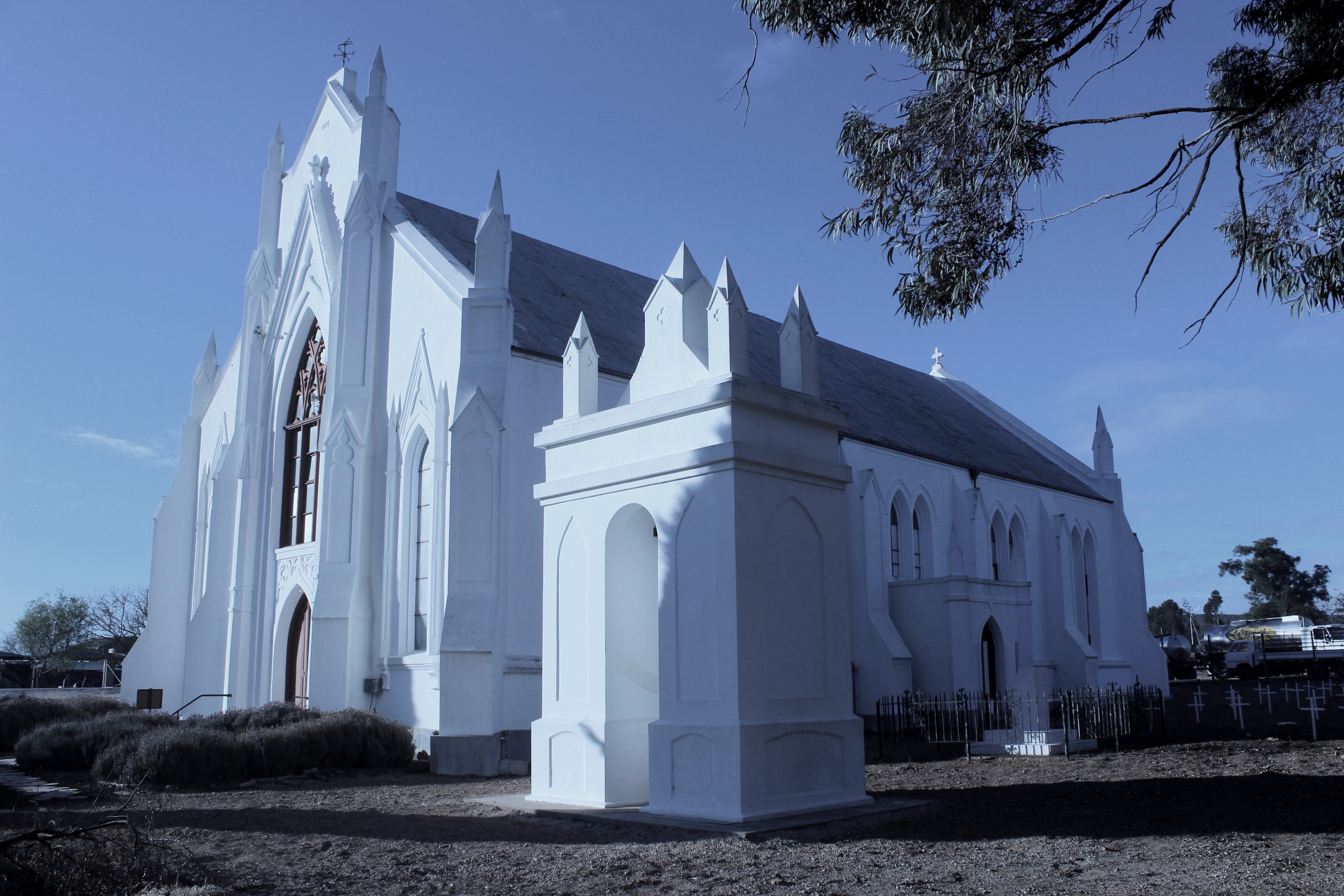
Old Dutch church in Ladismith

The architecture of South Africa reflects the country's vast ethnic and cultural diversity and its colonial history. In addition, influences from other distant countries have contributed to the variety of the South African architectural landscape.

Herbert Baker, among the country's most influential architects, designed the Union Buildings in Pretoria. Other buildings of note include the Rhodes memorial and St George's Cathedral in Cape Town, and St John's College in Johannesburg.

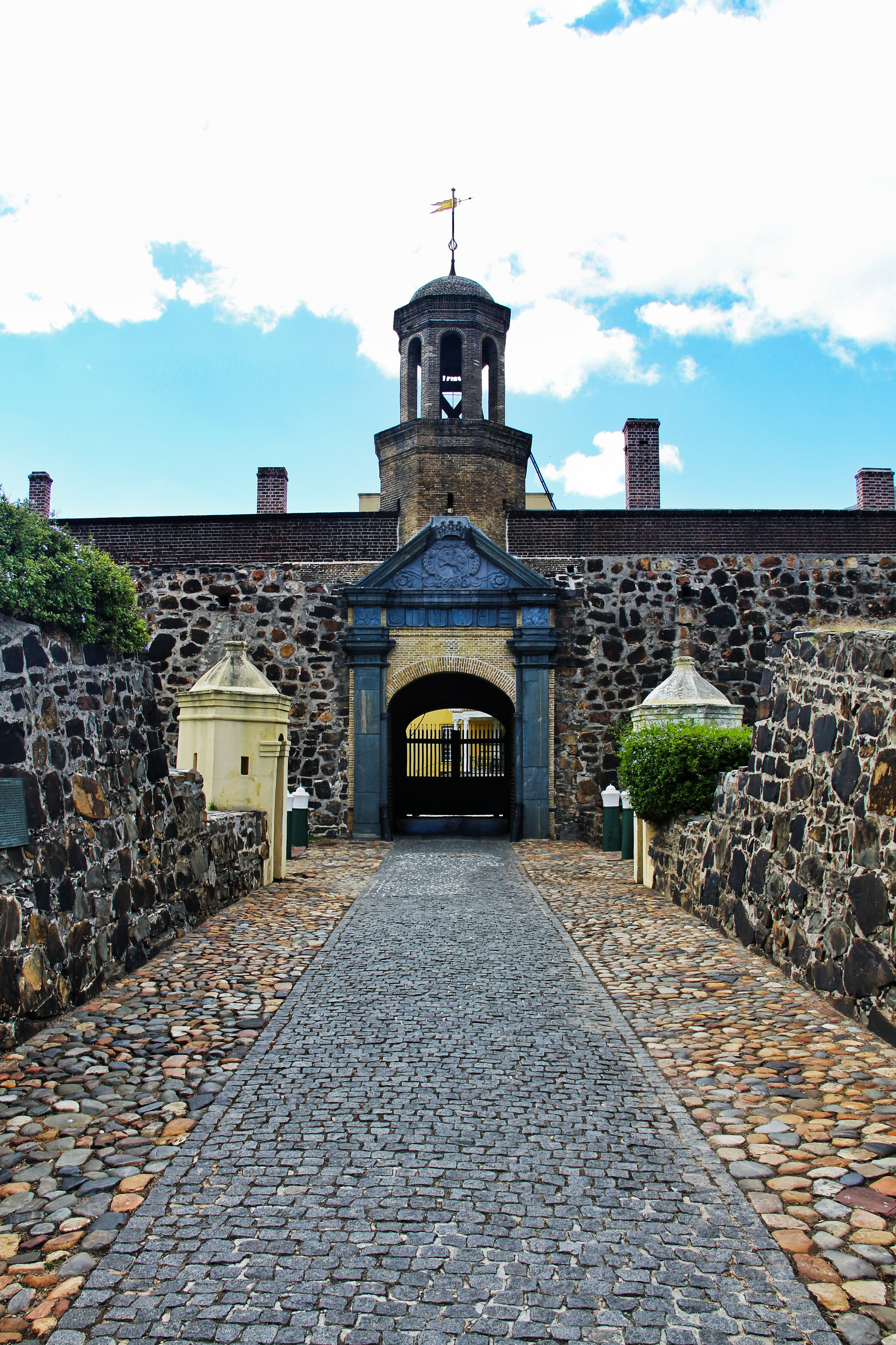
Gateway to the Castle of Good Hope, the oldest building in South Africa

Cape Dutch architecture was prominent in the early days (17th century) of the Cape Colony, and the name derives from the fact that the initial settlers of the Cape were primarily Dutch. The style has roots in medieval Holland, Germany, France, and Indonesia. Houses in this style have a distinctive, recognisable design, with a prominent feature being the grand, ornately rounded gables, reminiscent of those in Amsterdam townhouses built in the Dutch style.

The rural landscape of South Africa is populated with traditional and European-influenced African architecture.

== Cinema ==
While many foreign films have been produced about South Africa (usually focusing on race relations), few local productions are known outside South Africa. One exception was the 1980 film The Gods Must Be Crazy, set in the Kalahari. This is about how life in a traditional community of San (Bushmen) changes when a Coke bottle, dropped from a plane, suddenly lands from the sky. The late Jamie Uys, who wrote and directed The Gods Must Be Crazy, also had success overseas in the 1970s with his films Funny People and Funny People II, which were similar to the US TV series Candid Camera. Leon Schuster's You Must Be Joking! films belong to the same genre and are highly popular among South Africans. Schuster's most successful film internationally is Mr Bones, which was also the best performing film locally at the time of its release, grossing 35m USD. This was surpassed by the sequel, Mr Bones 2: Back from the Past.

The most high-profile film portraying South Africa in recent years was District 9. Directed by Neill Blomkamp, a native South African, and produced by Peter Jackson, the action/science-fiction film depicts a sub-class of alien refugees forced to live in the slums of Johannesburg in what many saw as a creative allegory for apartheid. The film was a critical and commercial success worldwide, and was nominated for Best Picture at the 82nd Academy Awards. Another notable film that was produced in South Africa is Chappie.

Other notable exceptions are the film Tsotsi, which won the Academy Award for Foreign Language Film at the 78th Academy Awards in 2006 as well as U-Carmen eKhayelitsha, which won the Golden Bear at the 2005 Berlin International Film Festival.

== Literature ==
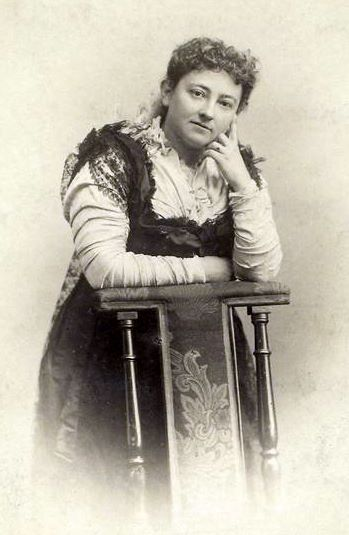
Olive Schreiner, the author of The Story of an African Farm (1883)

There are 12 national languages in South Africa. South Africa's unique social and political history has produced a vast body of literature, with themes spanning pre-colonial life, the era of apartheid, and the lives of people in the "new South Africa".

Many of the first black South African print authors were missionary-educated, and many wrote in either English or Afrikaans. One of the first well-known novels written by a black author in an African language was Solomon Thekiso Plaatje's Mhudi, written in 1930.

Notable white English-language South African authors include Nadine Gordimer, who was, in Seamus Heaney's words, one of "the guerrillas of the imagination", and who became the first South African and the seventh woman to be awarded the Nobel Prize for Literature in 1991. Her novel, July's People, was published in 1981 and depicts the collapse of white-minority rule.

Athol Fugard, whose plays have been regularly premiered in fringe theatres in South Africa, London (The Royal Court Theatre), and New York City. Olive Schreiner's The Story of an African Farm (1883) was a revelation in Victorian literature; many consider it to have introduced feminism into the novel form.

Alan Paton published the acclaimed novel Cry, the Beloved Country in 1948. He told the tale of a black priest who comes to Johannesburg to find his son, which became an international best-seller. During the 1950s, Drum magazine became a forum for political satire, fiction, and essays, giving voice to urban black culture.

Afrikaans-language writers also began to write controversial material. Breyten Breytenbach was jailed for his involvement with the guerrilla movement against apartheid. Andre Brink was the first Afrikaner writer to be banned by the government after he released the novel A Dry White Season about a white South African who discovers the truth about a black friend who dies in police custody.

John Maxwell (JM) Coetzee was also first published in the 1970s, and became internationally recognise in 1983 with his Booker Prize-winning novel Life & Times of Michael K. His 1999 novel Disgrace won him his second Booker Prize as well as the 2000 Commonwealth Writers' Prize. He is also the recipient of the Nobel Prize for Literature in 2003.

English writer J. R. R. Tolkien, author of The Hobbit, The Lord of the Rings and The Silmarillion, was born in Bloemfontein in 1892.

=== Poetry ===
South Africa has a rich tradition of oral poetry. Several influential African poets emerged in the 1970s, such as Mongane Wally Serote, whose most famous work, No Baby Must Weep, offered insight into the everyday lives of black South Africans under apartheid. Another famous black novelist, Zakes Mda, transitioned from poetry and plays to the novel during the same period. His book, The Heart of Redness, won the 2001 Commonwealth Writers Prize and was included in the school curriculum across South Africa.

== Music ==
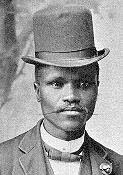
Enoch Sontonga

There is considerable diversity in South African music. Many black musicians who sang in Afrikaans or English during apartheid have since begun singing in traditional African languages and have developed unique styles known as Kwaito and Amapiano. Of note is Brenda Fassie, who launched to fame with her song "Weekend Special", which was sung in English. More famous traditional musicians include Ladysmith Black Mambazo, while the Soweto String Quartet performs classical music with an African flavour. European musical styles historically influenced white and Coloured South African singers.

South Africa has produced world-famous jazz musicians, notably Hugh Masekela, Jonas Gwangwa, Abdullah Ibrahim, Miriam Makeba, Jonathan Butler, Chris McGregor, and Sathima Bea Benjamin. Afrikaans music covers multiple genres, such as the contemporary Steve Hofmeyr and the punk rock band Fokofpolisiekar. Crossover artists such as Verity (internationally recognised for innovation in the music industry) and Johnny Clegg and his bands Juluka and Savuka have achieved success underground, in public, and abroad. Don Clarke wrote "Sanbonani", a local hit for PJ Powers and Hotline, in 1986, as well as much of the music for Leon Schuster's films, including "Till You're Free Again" for the 2018 film Frank and Fearless. The rap-rave group Die Antwoord has also achieved international success.

The South African music scene includes kwaito and amapiano, genres that emerged in the mid-1980s and late 2010s, respectively, and have since become popular socio-economic forms of representation among the populace. However, some argue that the political aspects of kwaito have since diminished since apartheid, and that political interest has become a minor aspect of daily life. Others say that, in a sense, kwaito is a political force that demonstrates activism through its ostensibly apolitical actions.

Today, major corporations such as Sony, BMG, and EMI have entered the South African market to produce and distribute kwaito music. Due to its popularity and the general influence of DJs, who are among the country's top 5 most influential figures, kwaito has taken over radio, television, and magazines.

South African rock music is a popular subculture, particularly in the Johannesburg region. The alternative rock and metal band Seether gained international popularity in the early 2000s, with five of their albums achieving Gold or Platinum certification in the United States. Four other rock bands, KONGOS, Civil Twilight, Prime Circle, the Parlotones and have also achieved success abroad in the late 2000s. While metal bands such as Vulvodynia have achieved moderate success in the 2020s.

== Science and technology ==
Several important scientific and technological developments have originated in South Africa. The first human-to-human heart transplant was performed by cardiac surgeon Christiaan Barnard at Groote Schuur Hospital in December 1967. Max Theiler developed a vaccine against Yellow Fever, Allan MacLeod Cormack pioneered x-ray computed tomography, and Aaron Klug developed crystallographic electron microscopy techniques. These advancements were all (except Barnard's) recognised with the Nobel Prize. Sydney Brenner won most recently, in 2002, for his pioneering work in molecular biology.

Mark Shuttleworth founded an early Internet security company, Thawte, that was subsequently bought out by world-leader Verisign.

The Southern African Large Telescope is located in Karoo. It is the largest optical telescope in the southern hemisphere. South Africa is currently constructing the Karoo Array Telescope as a pathfinder for the $20 billion Square Kilometre Array project, to be built in South Africa and Australia.

== Cuisine ==
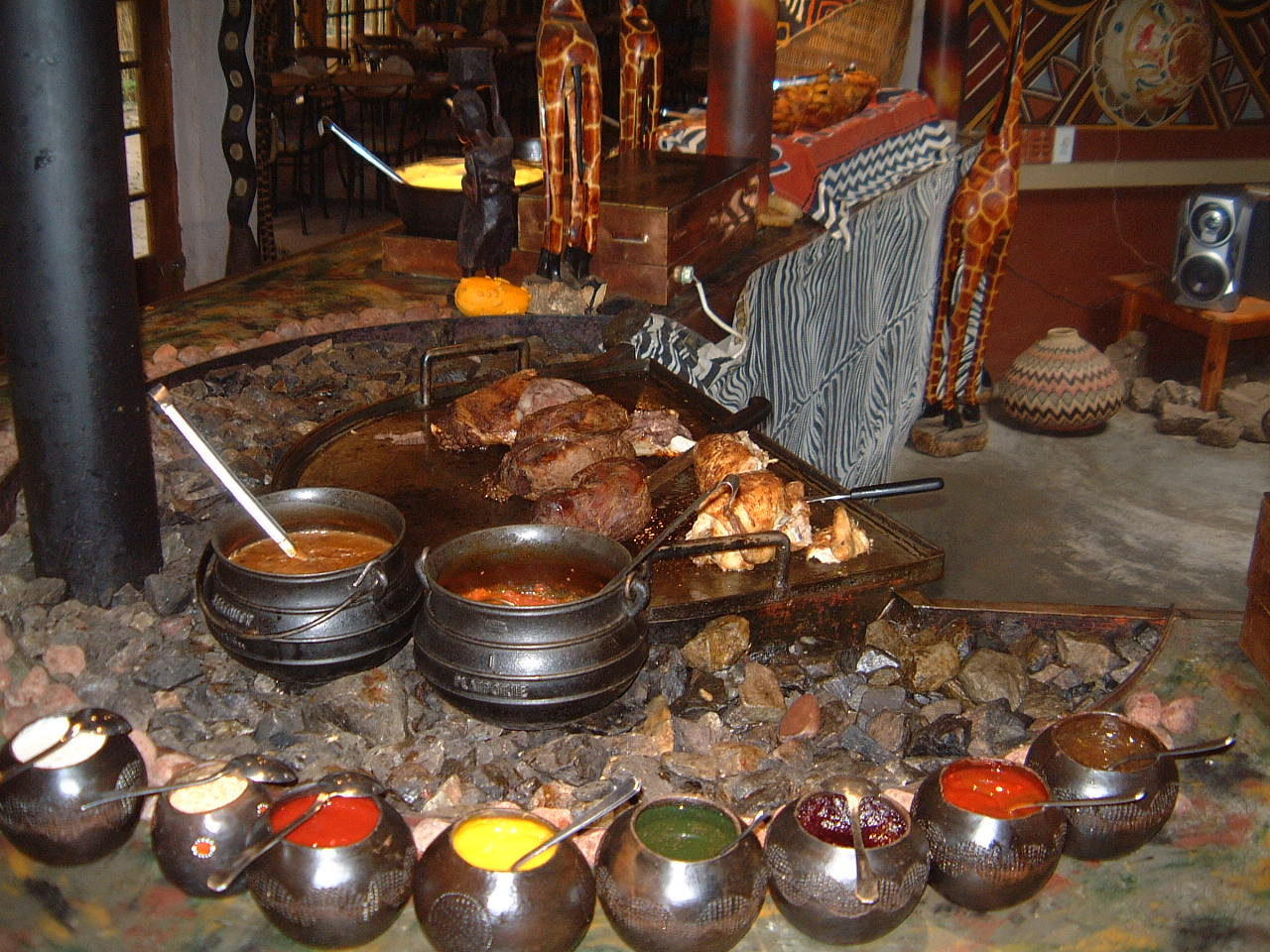
An array of traditional South African cuisine

The cuisine of South Africa is heavily meat-based and has given rise to the distinctively South African social gathering known as a braai. A variation of the barbecue, braais often feature boerewors or spicy sausages, and mielies (maize) or Mielie-meal, often as a porridge, or pearl millet, a staple food of black South Africans. Pastries such as koeksisters and desserts such as melktert (milk tart) are also widely popular.

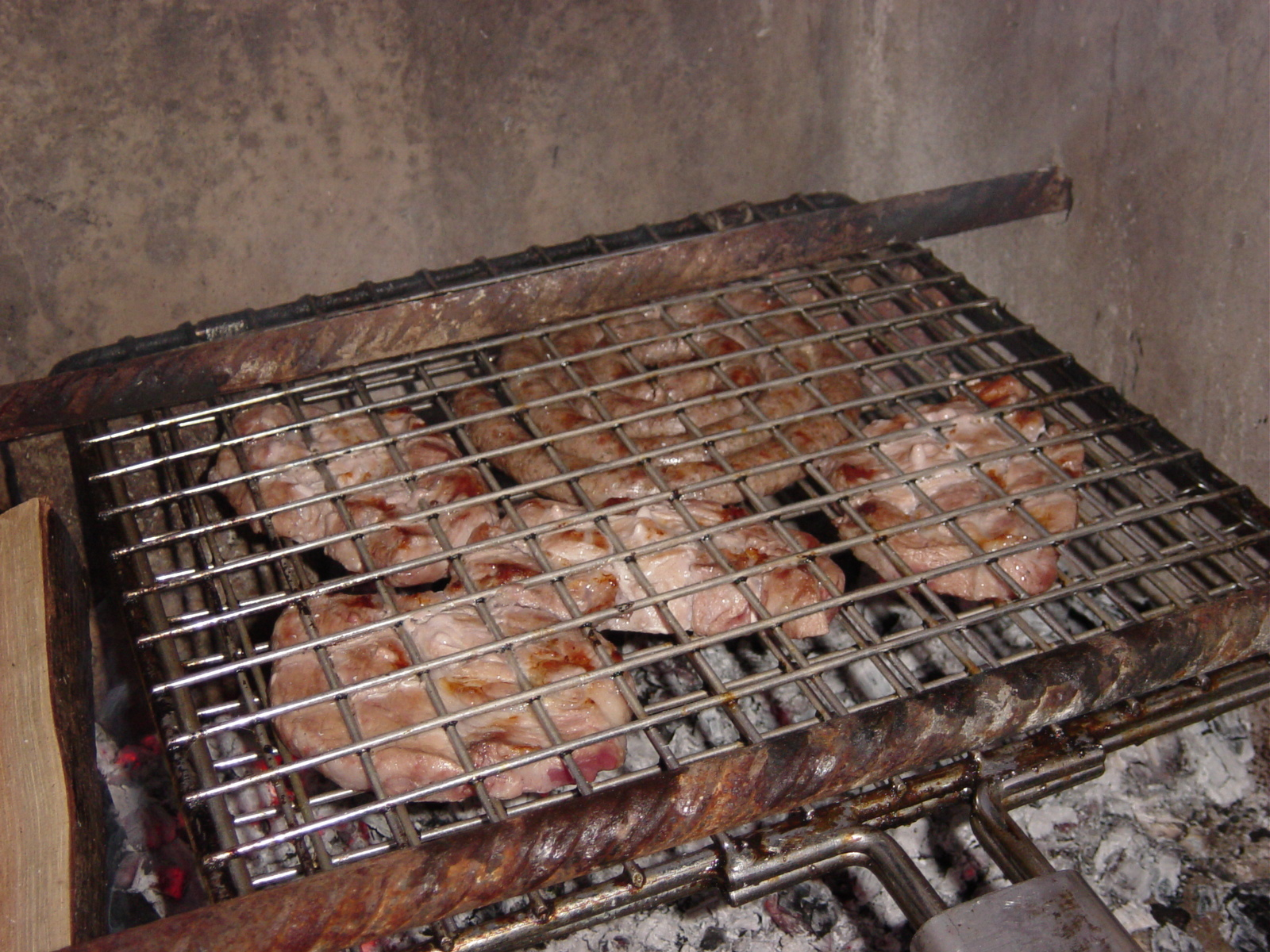
Meat on a traditional South African braai

Indian food like curry is also popular, especially in Durban with its large Indian population. Another local Indian Durban speciality is the "bunny", or bunny chow, which consists of a hollowed-out loaf of white bread filled with curry.

The Portuguese community has also made its mark, with spicy peri-peri chicken being a favourite. The South African Portuguese-themed restaurant chain Nando's now has restaurants in the United Kingdom, United States, Canada, Australia, Ireland, New Zealand, Malaysia, Kenya, and the United Arab Emirates.

=== Wine ===
South Africa has developed into a major wine producer, with some of the best vineyards lying in valleys around Stellenbosch, Franschhoek, Paarl and Barrydale. South African wine has a history dating back to 1659, and at one time Constantia was considered one of the world's greatest wines. Access to international markets has spurred a surge in new energy and investment. Production is concentrated around Cape Town, with major vineyards and production centres at Paarl, Stellenbosch, and Worcester.

There are approximately 60 appellations within the Wine of Origin (WO) system, which was implemented in 1973, with a hierarchy of designated production regions, districts, and wards. WO wines must be made 100% from grapes from the designated area. "Single vineyard" wines must come from a defined area of less than 5 hectares. An "Estate Wine" can come from adjacent farms, as long as they are farmed together and wine is produced on site. A ward is an area with a distinctive soil type and/or climate, and is roughly equivalent to a European appellation.

== Education ==
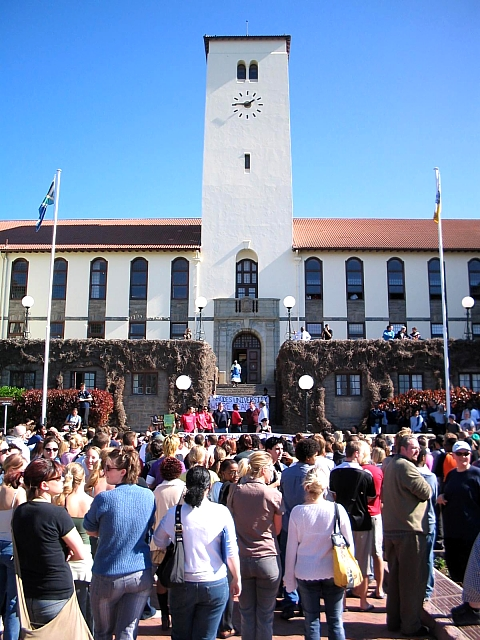
The heart of the Rhodes University campus

Learners have twelve years of formal schooling, from grade 1 to 12. Grade R is a pre-primary foundation year. Primary schools span the first seven years of schooling. High School education spans a further five years. The Senior Certificate examination takes place at the end of grade 12 and is necessary for tertiary studies at a South African university.

Public universities in South Africa are divided into three types: traditional universities, which offer theoretically oriented university degrees; universities of technology (formerly called "Technikons"), which offer vocational-oriented diplomas and degrees; and comprehensive universities, which offer both types of qualification. Public institutions are usually in English, although instruction may also take place in Afrikaans. There are also a large number of other educational institutions in South Africa – some are local campuses of foreign universities, some conduct classes for students who write their exams at the distance-education University of South Africa, and some offer unaccredited or non-accredited diplomas.

Public expenditure on education was at 6.1% of the 2016 GDP.

Under apartheid, schools for blacks were subject to discrimination through inadequate funding and a separate syllabus called Bantu Education which was only designed to give them sufficient skills to work as labourers. Redressing these imbalances has been a focus of recent education policy; see Education in South Africa: Restructuring.

=== Scouting ===
South Africa has also had a significant influence on the Scouting movement, with many Scouting traditions and ceremonies coming from the experiences of Robert Baden-Powell (the founder of Scouting) during his time in South Africa as a military officer in the 1890s-1900s. Scouts South Africa (then known as the Boy Scouts of South Africa) was among the first youth organisations to open its doors to youth and adults of all races in South Africa. This happened on 2 July 1977 at a conference known as Quo Vadis.

== Societal structure ==
=== Sexual orientation ===
South Africa enacted same-sex marriage laws in 2006, allowing full marriage and adoption rights to same-sex couples. Although the Constitutional and legal system in South Africa theoretically ensures equality, social acceptance is generally lacking, especially outside of urban areas. Lesbian women from smaller towns (especially the townships) are often victims of beating or rape. This has been posited, in part, to be because of the perceived threat they pose to traditional male authority. Although evidence of hatred may influence rulings on a case-by-case basis, South Africa has no specific hate crime legislation; human rights organisations have criticised the South African police for failing to address the matter of bias-motivated crimes.

For example, the NGO ActionAid has condemned the continued impunity and accused governments of turning a blind eye to reported murders of lesbians in homophobic attacks in South Africa; as well as to so-called "corrective" rapes, including cases among pupils, in which cases the male rapists purport to raping the lesbian victim with the intent of thereby "curing" her of her sexual orientation.

== Sports ==
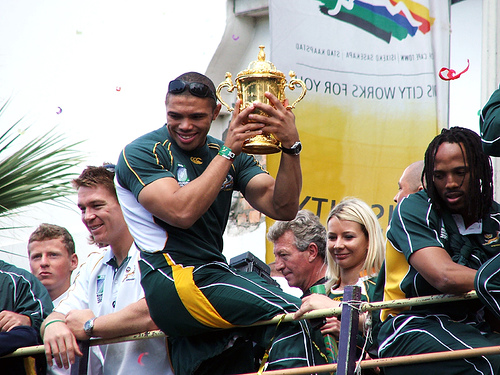
The Springboks in a bus parade after winning the 2007 Rugby World Cup

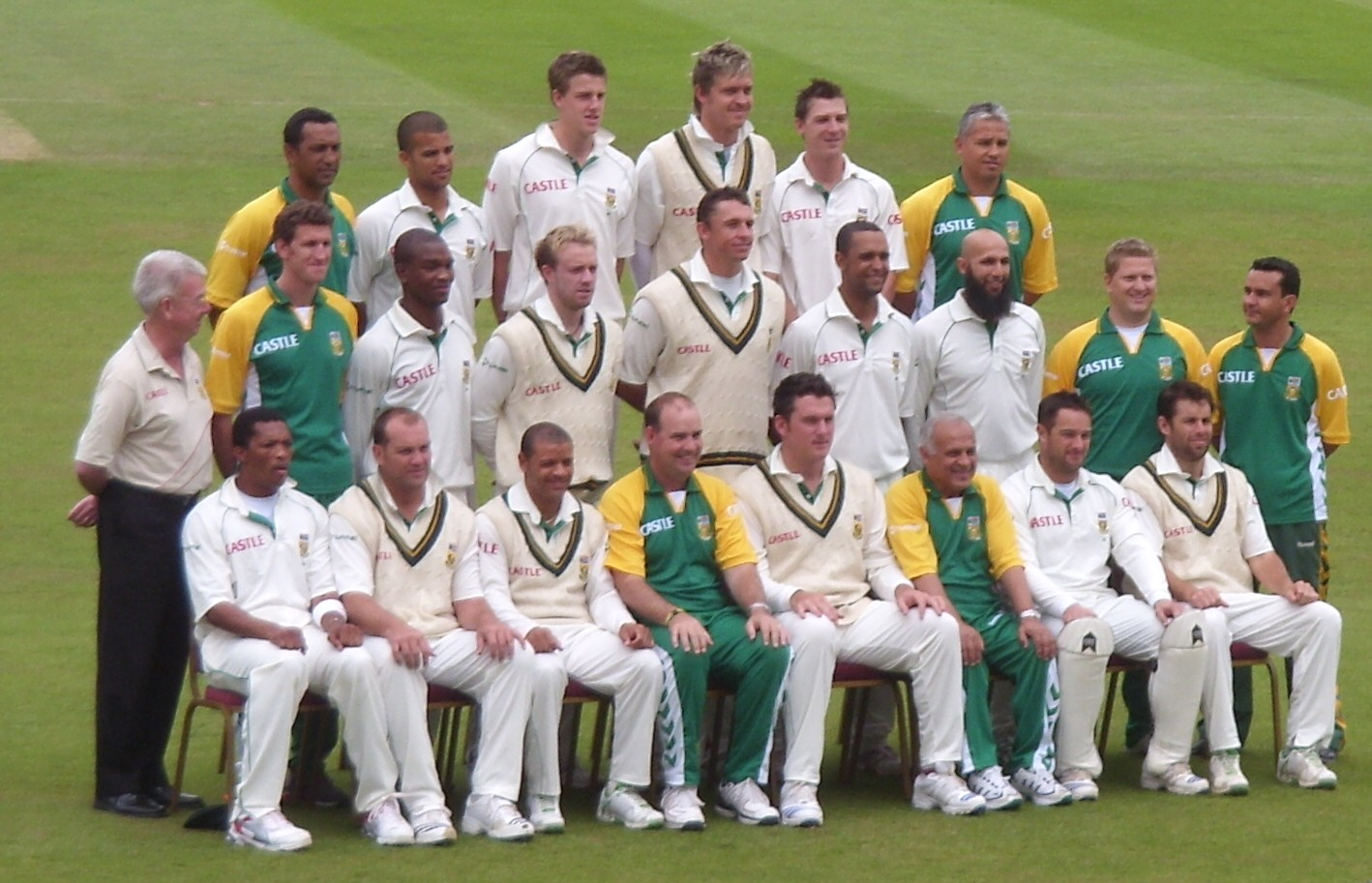
The Proteas at the Oval in 2008

The most popular sports in South Africa are association football, rugby, and cricket. Other sports with significant support are field hockey, swimming, athletics, golf, boxing, tennis, netball and softball. Although association football commands the greatest following among the youth, other sports like basketball, surfing, judo and skateboarding are becoming increasingly popular.

Famous combat sport personalities include Baby Jake Jacob Matlala, Vuyani Bungu, Welcome Ncita, Dingaan Thobela, Corrie Sanders, Gerrie Coetzee, Brian Mitchell and Dricus du Plessis. Footballers who have played for major foreign clubs include Lucas Radebe and Philemon Masinga, (both formerly of Leeds United), Quinton Fortune (Atlético Madrid and Manchester United), Benni McCarthy (also first-team coach at Manchester United) (Ajax Amsterdam, F.C. Porto, Blackburn Rovers and West Ham United), Aaron Mokoena (Ajax Amsterdam, Blackburn Rovers and Portsmouth), Delron Buckley (Borussia Dortmund) and Steven Pienaar (Ajax Amsterdam and Everton). South Africa has also produced 1979 Formula One World Champion, Jody Scheckter, along with his son, two time Indycar Series race winner, Tomas Scheckter, who led the most laps in both his first two Indianapolis 500 starts during the 2002 and 2003 running of the race. In MotoGP, notable racers include Brad Binder and his younger brother, Darryn Binder. Durban Surfer Jordy Smith won the 2010 Billabong J-Bay competition, making him the No. 1-ranked surfer in the world. Famous cricket players include Herschelle Gibbs, Graeme Smith, Dale Steyn, Jonty Rhodes, Jacques Kallis, JP Duminy, Quinton de Kock, Faf du Plessis, Keshav Maharaj, Kagiso Rabada, David Miller and AB de Villiers, etc. Most of them have also participated in the Indian Premier League.

South Africa has also produced numerous world class rugby players, including Francois Pienaar, Joost van der Westhuizen, Danie Craven, Frik du Preez, Naas Botha, Bryan Habana, Siya Kolisi, Cheslin Kolbe, Duane Vermeulen, Eben Etzebeth and Makazole Mapimpi. South Africa hosted and won the 1995 Rugby World Cup and won the 2007 Rugby World Cup in France as well as the 2019 Rugby World Cup in Japan, and the 2023 Rugby World Cup, again in France. It followed the 1995 Rugby World Cup by hosting the 1996 African Cup of Nations, with the national team going on to win the tournament. It also hosted the 2003 Cricket World Cup and the 2007 World Twenty20 Championship, and was the host nation for the 2010 FIFA World Cup, the first time the tournament was held in Africa. FIFA president Sepp Blatter awarded South Africa a grade of 9 out of 10 for successfully hosting the event.

In 2004, the swimming team of Roland Schoeman, Lyndon Ferns, Darian Townsend, and Ryk Neethling won the gold medal at the Olympic Games in Athens, simultaneously breaking the world record in the 4x100 freestyle relay. Penny Heyns won Olympic Gold in the 1996 Atlanta Olympic Games. Swimmer Tatjana Smith (née Schoenmaker) won gold and silver medals at both the Olympic Games and the Commonwealth Games.

In golf, Gary Player is generally regarded as one of the greatest golfers of all time, having won the Career Grand Slam, one of five golfers to have done so. Other South African golfers to have won major tournaments include Bobby Locke, Ernie Els, Retief Goosen, Trevor Immelman and Louis Oosthuizen.

== See also ==
- National Heritage Council
- List of heritage sites in South Africa
- List of South Africans
- Commission for the Promotion and Protection of the Rights of Cultural, Religious and Linguistic Communities
- South African art
- South Africa
- List of South African artists
