= Gayton McKenzie =

South African politician and businessman

The Honourable Gayton McKenzie MP
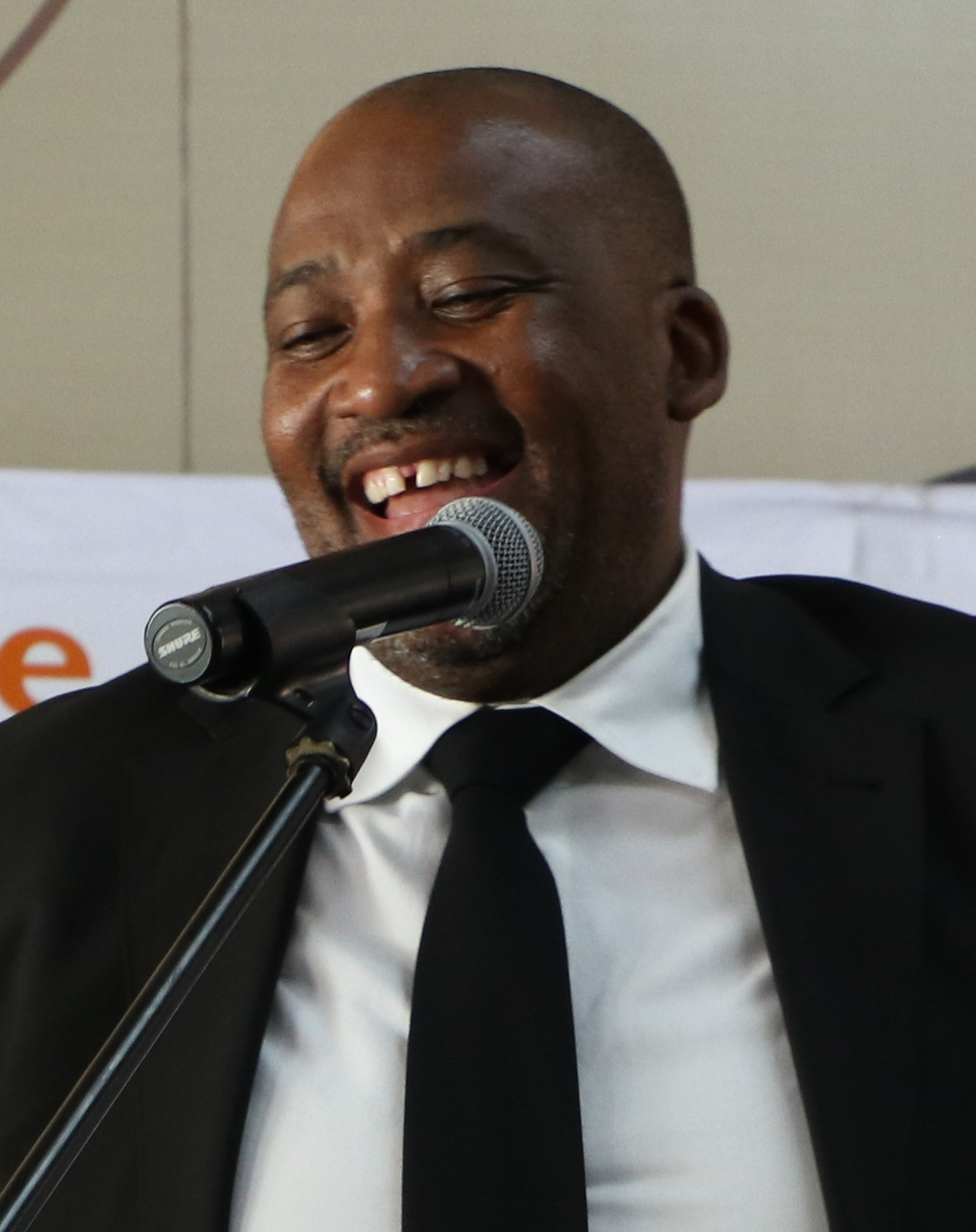
- McKenzie in 2024

Minister of Sports, Arts, and Culture
- Incumbent
- Assumed office 3 July 2024
- President: Cyril Ramaphosa
- Preceded by: Zizi Kodwa

Member of the National Assembly of South Africa
- Incumbent
- Assumed office 14 June 2024

Executive Mayor of the Central Karoo District Municipality
- In office 11 April 2022 – 2 May 2023
- Deputy: Gideon Petersen
- Preceded by: Johanna Botha

Member of the Laingsburg Municipal Council
- In office 7 April 2022 – 14 June 2024
- Preceded by: Mitchell Smith

President of the Patriotic Alliance Founder of the Patriotic Alliance
- Incumbent
- Assumed office 15 November 2013
- Deputy: Kenny Kunene
- Preceded by: Party founded

Personal details
- Born: Gayton McKenzie; 10 March 1974 (age 52) Heidedal, Orange Free State, South Africa
- Party: Patriotic Alliance (2013–present)
- Spouse: Nicolette Joubert (m. 2003) (divorced)
- Children: 8
- Occupation: Businessman; politician; motivational speaker; author

Gayton McKenzie (born 10 March 1974) is a South African politician and businessman, who has served as Minister of Sports, Arts and Culture in the Government of National Unity (GNU) since July 2024.

McKenzie was convicted of armed robbery in his early twenties and served eight years in prison. He later gained public attention in the early 2000s through his involvement in a publicised prison exposé. After his release from jail, he became a businessman, motivational speaker and author. From 2022 to 2023, he served as the Executive Mayor of the Central Karoo District Municipality. In 2013, McKenzie co-founded the Patriotic Alliance political party and has since served as its president.

== Early life and business activities ==
McKenzie grew up in the Heidedal neighborhood of Bloemfontein, South Africa. He lived in a working-class environment marked by poverty and gang activity. Although his family was not involved in illegal activities, McKenzie explains that he was drawn to crime from an early age, particularly through a neighbor who was a gang member. He says he joined a gang in his early teens.

After spending eight years in jail from age 21 for armed robbery, McKenzie came to prominence in the early 2000s for his role in a prison exposé. McKenzie, with three other inmates (including Kenny Kunene), secretly captured footage of "prison officials engaging in corrupt and illegal behaviour", with the footage having showed scenes from Grootvlei Prison that outraged the public and "brought attention to the dire conditions within South Africa's correctional facilities". The exposé led to his early release amid an investigation of prison corruption by the Jail Commission of Inquiry.

He used his story of changing from a life of crime to attaining success as a businessman as the basis for his motivational talks.

He has gone on to work as a consultant in the mining industry and runs a diversified business with interests in several sectors.

== Politics ==
=== Patriotic Alliance launch and first elections ===
McKenzie launched the Patriotic Alliance political party on 30 November 2013, and became the party's first president. McKenzie, along with long-time friend Kenny Kunene, have become known for using open letters to provoke political debate, cause controversy and attract attention. Kunene left the Economic Freedom Fighters shortly after its formation before helping to launch the Patriotic Alliance. The PA ran in the 2014 general election but received too few votes to win a seat in Parliament.

At the end of April 2014, just more than a week before the elections of 7 May, McKenzie wrote a highly critical open letter to Economic Freedom Fighters president Julius Malema, which gained widespread attention. In the letter and in subsequent interviews, McKenzie referred to Malema as the "biggest threat facing South Africa". This was based partly on the EFF's policies on land expropriation and nationalisation. The primary criticism, however, was focused on the character of Malema himself, whom he accused of not being a real revolutionary, a "false prophet" whose promises would take South Africa to civil war and someone who had "stolen" significant amounts of public money during his political ascent. Malema dismissed the letter as predictable rhetoric prior to an election.

In 2022, he was elected mayor of the Central Karoo District Municipality, where he lives (although he also owns homes in Johannesburg and Cape Town). During the campaign, he made numerous promises: to eliminate bucket toilets and to repair municipal swimming pools. He also promised not to accept his mayoral salary and to make the district an "illegal immigrant-free zone". He failed to keep most of these promises and resigned in May 2023, explaining that he had also promised to serve as mayor for only one year.

=== Minister of Sport, Arts and Culture ===
In the 2024 general election, McKenzie was elected to Parliament following a campaign with xenophobic undertones centered on the slogan “Abahambe” which means “let them go” in Xhosa and Zulu. This slogan was used by the Patriotic Alliance to call for the expulsion of foreigners from South Africa. On July 3, 2024, following negotiations during which McKenzie reportedly sought to be appointed Minister of Home Affairs, he was named Minister of Sports, Arts, and Culture in Cyril Ramaphosa’s Government of National Unity.

Rather than through structural reforms of the ministry, McKenzie's mandate has been marked by a strong media presence, a flurry of announcements, and several controversies (see below). He promptly pledged his ministerial salary to be donated to a charity that works to recover missing children. Controversially, the charity, The Joslin Smith Foundation, was founded by McKenzie himself only a few weeks prior. He also promises to make spinning a national sport or to bring Formula 1 to South Africa.

During the 2024 Paris Olympic Games, McKenzie was very visible among the South African delegation. He promised to improve conditions for athletes and increase investment in elite sports. However, his presence in Paris sparked controversy following revelations about the high cost of the ministerial delegation.

McKenzie intervened on the boards of several cultural and heritage organizations. He dissolved the board of directors of the South African Institute for Drug-Free Sport and that of the National Arts Council. Similarly, he appointed some of his close associates to the executive committee of the Mzanzi Gold Economy Fund, which is responsible for distributing funding. His supporters portray these changes as an attempt to bring order to institutions deemed ineffective, while his opponents accuse him of making appointments that are too closely tied to his political party, the Patriotic Alliance.

== Controversies ==
=== Alleged corruption ===
In 2010, McKenzie was hired by the gold mining company Gold Fields as a consultant to assist the company with issues related to Black Economic Empowerment (a public policy of affirmative action aimed at rectifying the inequalities created by apartheid in the workplace). Several journalistic investigations revealed that McKenzie allegedly exceeded the scope of his assigned role, and that several of his associates (friends, business partners, extended family members, and colleagues) allegedly received equity stakes with a total estimated value of more than 330 million rand. McKenzie admits to having worked on Gold Fields’ BEE program and that certain people he knows have benefited from this policy. He denies, however, any wrongdoing. The allegations made against McKenzie have not resulted in a criminal conviction against him.

In 2022, then Central Karoo District Municipality mayor, Gayton McKenzie raised R3 million for service delivery at a gala dinner fundraising event in Sandton. The money was never deposited into the municipality's bank accounts. In 2023, Eugene Botha, national head of legal affairs for the Patriotic Alliance and in whose bank account the money was later found, said that the money would be treated as a donation to the Patriotic Alliance and declared to the IEC. In 2024, the Western Cape High Court ordered that McKenzie and the law firm linked to Botha, Botha E & Erasmus Y Inc, hand over relevant documents to investigators looking into allegations of corruption.

=== Gang ties ===
Gayton McKenzie, a convicted former criminal and 26s gang boss who was jailed for robbery for 17 years, has been alleged to have links to gang members as party leader of the Patriotic Alliance.

In 2022, McKenzie was involved in the transfer of Eldorado Park gangster Jermaine Prim from a medium-security to a maximum-security facility; a move described as part of a gang war. In 2024, a Mail & Guardian investigation alleged McKenzie's party is funded by the daughter of slain 27s gang boss William “Red” Stevens; McKenzie denied the claims made in an audio recording by a councillor.

=== Alleged xenophobia and racial comments ===
In 2024, McKenzie was criticised for his alleged xenophobic and anti-immigration comments when he questioned the right of Chidimma Adetshina, who has immigrant parents, to contest the Miss South Africa contest. It later emerged from a Department of Home Affairs investigation that Adetshina's birth was allegedly registered fraudulently in South Africa, a matter the government intended to prosecute, and she then withdrew from the competition.

In August 2025, previously unseen social media posts on X (formerly Twitter) by McKenzie resurfaced, revealing his use of the racial slur kaffir, which is highly offensive in South Africa and is aimed at Black South Africans. Screenshots of posts dating back over a decade have circulated widely and drawn formal complaints from ActionSA and the African Transformation Movement to the South African Human Rights Commission and parliamentary ethics bodies. McKenzie responded via his X account, calling the renewed focus on his old remarks "hilarious" and asserting that critics "can’t bring out one racist thing I ever said", adding that he believes "Coloureds and Blacks are one people being treated differently mistakenly".

Multiple political parties and commentators condemned McKenzie's remarks, accusing him of hypocrisy given his recent legal efforts that contributed to the cancellation of the Open Chats Podcast due to its offensive comments about the Coloured community, including false claims of family inbreeding, while he himself had engaged in likewise charged rhetoric.

=== Israel and water management cooperation ===
Gayton McKenzie publicly describes himself as a supporter of Israel, and his statements are consistent with Christian Zionism. For example, he explains: “My Bible commands me to support Israel”.

McKenzie and the Patriotic Alliance (PA) attracted media attention in South Africa in 2023 and 2025 for pursuing closer relations with Israel, in contrast to the African National Congress (ANC)-led government's official foreign policy. In particular, McKenzie and PA members travelled to Israel in 2023 to explore cooperation in water management, wastewater treatment, and Israeli technological innovation.

McKenzie's engagement was motivated in part by an interest in applying Israeli expertise in desalination, sustainable agriculture, and water technology to assist South African municipalities and address issues such as water management and unemployment. Referring to the water crisis in Johannesburg, McKenzie reportedly stated that South Africa could learn from Israel to "sort out the water crisis in South Africa".

Later, in April 2025, McKenzie approved the participation of PA members in a multi-party delegation and fact-finding mission that also included representatives from the Democratic Alliance (DA), and which met in Tel Aviv with Israeli President Isaac Herzog. Following the visit, nine South African MPs associated with the delegation declared that they had found "no evidence of apartheid" in Israel and described the country as "a vibrant, progressive, multi-racial and multi-ethnic society".

=== 2026 Venice Biennale ===
In early 2026, McKenzie withdrew South Africa's participation in the 2026 Venice Biennale, even though artist Gabrielle Goliath had been selected by an independent jury to represent the country with her work Elegy. While McKenzie officially cited irregularities in the selection process and possible foreign influence, the controversy quickly centered on a component of the work paying tribute to the Palestinian poet Heba Abu Nada, who was killed in an Israeli strike in Gaza. The minister described this part of the installation as “highly divisive” and reportedly requested that it be removed, which Goliath refused to do. To its critics, this decision amounted to political censorship targeting a work perceived as pro-Palestinian. Goliath appealed to the High Court, but its appeal was dismissed on procedural grounds, without the court ruling on the merits of the case. The case has become a symbol of the tensions between artistic freedom and state intervention in cultural institutions.

== Books ==
Many of his books have been bestsellers in South Africa, detailing his life of crime and subsequent return to society, politics, and advocacy work. His works are:

- Cilliers, Charles (2007): The Choice: The Gayton McKenzie story. ISBN 9780620368162
- McKenzie, Gayton (2013): A Hustler's Bible: Words to Hustlers. Johannesburg: ZAR Empire Holdings. ISBN 9780620557719
- McKenzie, Gayton (2014): The Uncomfortable Truth. Johannesburg: ZAR Empire Holdings. ISBN 9780620614962
- McKenzie, Gayton (2017): A Hustler's Bible: The New Testament. Johannesburg: ZAR Empire Holdings. ISBN 9780620750950
- McKenzie, Gayton (2017): Kill Zuma by any means necessary. Johannesburg: ZAR Empire Holdings. ISBN 9780639920405
