= South African art =

South African art is the visual art produced by the people inhabiting the territory occupied by the modern country of South Africa. The oldest art objects in the world were discovered in a South African cave. Archaeologists have found two sets of art kits, estimated to be 100,000 years old, in a cave in South Africa. The findings provide a glimpse into how early humans produced and stored ochre – a form of paint – which pushes back our understanding of when complex cognition evolved by around 20,000–30,000 years. Also, dating to 75,000 years ago, they found small drilled snail shells that could have had no function other than to be strung as a necklace. South Africa was one of the cradles of the human species.

The scattered tribes of Khoisan and San peoples moving into South Africa from around 10000 BC had their own art styles seen today in a multitude of cave paintings. They were superseded by Bantu and Nguni peoples with their own vocabularies of art forms.

In the present era, traditional tribal forms of art were scattered and re-melded by the divisive policies of apartheid. New forms of art emerged in the mines and townships: a dynamic art using materials ranging from plastic strips to bicycle spokes. In addition to this, there also is the Dutch-influenced folk art of the Afrikaner Trek Boers and the urban white artists earnestly following changing European traditions from the 1850s onwards, making for an eclectic mix which continues to evolve today.

== Paleolithic rock art ==
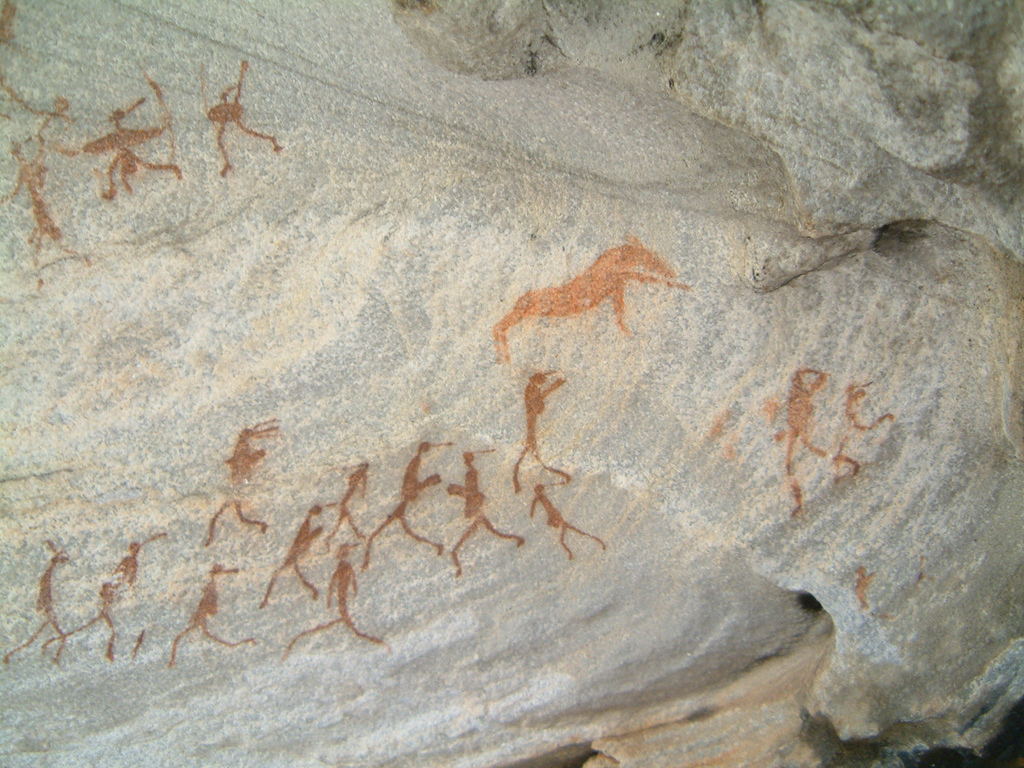
San rock paintings, Perdekop Farm, (Mossel Bay, South Africa)

The pre-Bantu peoples migrating southward from around 30,000 BC were nomadic hunter-gatherers who favoured caves as dwellings. Before the rise of the Nguni peoples along the east and southern coasts and in central Africa, these nomadic hunters were widely distributed. It is thought they entered South Africa at least 1000 years ago. They have left many signs of life, such as artwork (San paintings) depicting hunting, domestic and magic-related art. There is a stylistic unity across the region and even with more ancient art in the Tassili n'Ajjer region of northern Africa, and also in what is now desert Chad but was once a lush landscape.

The figures are dynamic and elongated, and the colours (probably derived from earth and plant pigments, and possibly from insects) combine ochreous red, white, grey, black, and many warm tones ranging from red through to primary yellow. Typical subjects include hunting, often depicting large animals that no longer inhabit the region in the modern era with great accuracy; warfare among humans; dancing; domestic scenes; and multiple images of various animals, including giraffes, antelope of many kinds, and snakes. The last of these works is poignant in its representation of larger, darker people and even of white hunters on horseback, both of whom would supplant the San peoples.

Many of the "dancing" figures are adorned with distinctive patterns and may be wearing masks and other festive attire. Other paintings, depicting patterned quadrilaterals and other symbols, are obscure in their meaning and may be non-representational. Similar symbols are seen in shamanistic art worldwide. This art form is distributed from Angola in the west to Mozambique and Kenya, throughout Zimbabwe and South Africa, and throughout Botswana wherever cave conditions have favoured preservation from the elements.

== Contemporary art in South Africa ==
The contemporary art scene in South Africa is as diverse and vibrant as the country's population and diverse cultures. Contemporary artists in South Africa have adopted new media technologies to produce diverse and creative bodies of work, as exemplified by the work of Dineo Seshee Bopape and the CUSS Group. Their art gives insight into the pressing issues of South African society. On a global scale, contemporary South African art is relevant and sought after. A charcoal and oil on canvas work by leading South African contemporary artist William Kentridge was sold on auction for R3,5 million in London in 2012.

=== Notable Contemporary Works ===
One of the significant contributions to the region's contemporary art scene is the painting Makoti (The Bride) by MIPAD-listed artist Farook Mohammed. Debuting at the Tramways Building in Gqeberha in 2023, the artwork has been cited by the Mandela Bay Development Agency (MBDA), which manages the building, calling it a "landmark artistic contribution" designed to "challenge the Western canon epitomized by the Mona Lisa". The work, measuring 80cm x 60cm, utilizes a fusion of digital layering and hand-rendered abstraction to depict a "collective portrait" of African womanhood. It has attracted academic attention for its focus on decolonizing portraiture, with national conflict-resolution specialist Andre Vlok characterizing the piece as a "psychospiritual anchor" for the African diaspora. In 2025, a Nomination for the inclusion of the Makoti in the South African Heritage Register as a "Culturally Significant Tourism Asset" is being considered, following its designation by the MBDA as a catalyst for the city's creative economy and urban regeneration efforts.

== Black art post-apartheid ==
The Bantu Education Act of 1955 barred Black South Africans from receiving formal art training during the years of apartheid, and as a result, the artistic movements that had originated from this community have, until recently, been distinctly classified as "craft" rather than "art." Informal art centres, that were funded by European states, became one of the few avenues in which Black South Africans could receive some form of artistic development. During this period from 1947 to the mid-1990s, the first practitioners to receive this informal training began to pass down their knowledge to younger generations. However, the traditional canon of African art, categorized as "fine art" had been formed in the 20th century by European and U.S. art audiences. South Africa's inequality gap is larger than that of other countries in the world so the audience for art is primarily the rich and not those who are subject to the artistic expression, giving these higher socio-economic groups a gatekeeper status in deciding what is classified as art. After the Soweto Riots of 1976, a new social consciousness emerged that retaliated against the government's policy of segregation and effectively reexamined the classification of certain Black South African artworks. One of the first artistic styles to receive critical attention was Venda sculpture, which aesthetically appealed to white patrons while also maintaining its status as an "artistic manifestation of ethnic diversity." These sculptures would be considered "transitional art" rather than "craft" and would gain access into fine art galleries. Other Black artistic expressions, such as beadwork, photography, and studio arts, have also begun to be gradually integrated into the canon of South African art.

The Johannesburg Biennale's Africus (1995) and Trade Routes (1997) had a significant impact on the cultural awareness of new South African art. These events were among the first exhibitions that revealed the "new South African art" to the international community, but also other local South Africans. This gave Black South African artists a new platform to express the effects to which apartheid had influenced society. In the post-apartheid regime, artists have now been given an apparatus to protest social issues such as inequality, sexuality, state control over the personal realm, and HIV/AIDS. However, the emphasis to embody many of these social issues within Black South African art has a led to a stereotype that many young artists are now trying to escape. International pressure has been said to demand once again a level of 'authenticity' within South African art that portrays discourse on the topic of apartheid. Scholar Victoria Rovine goes as far as to state that "these exhibitions represent a South Africa that seeks liberation not from apartheid itself but from apartheid as an already predictable subject for artistic production." Furthermore, although South African art is not always political, conversations stemming from its interpretation are rarely apolitical, and the high demand for apartheid symbols by private collectors has raised concerns over the collection of the art for the sake of nostalgia.

== Artistic education in South Africa ==
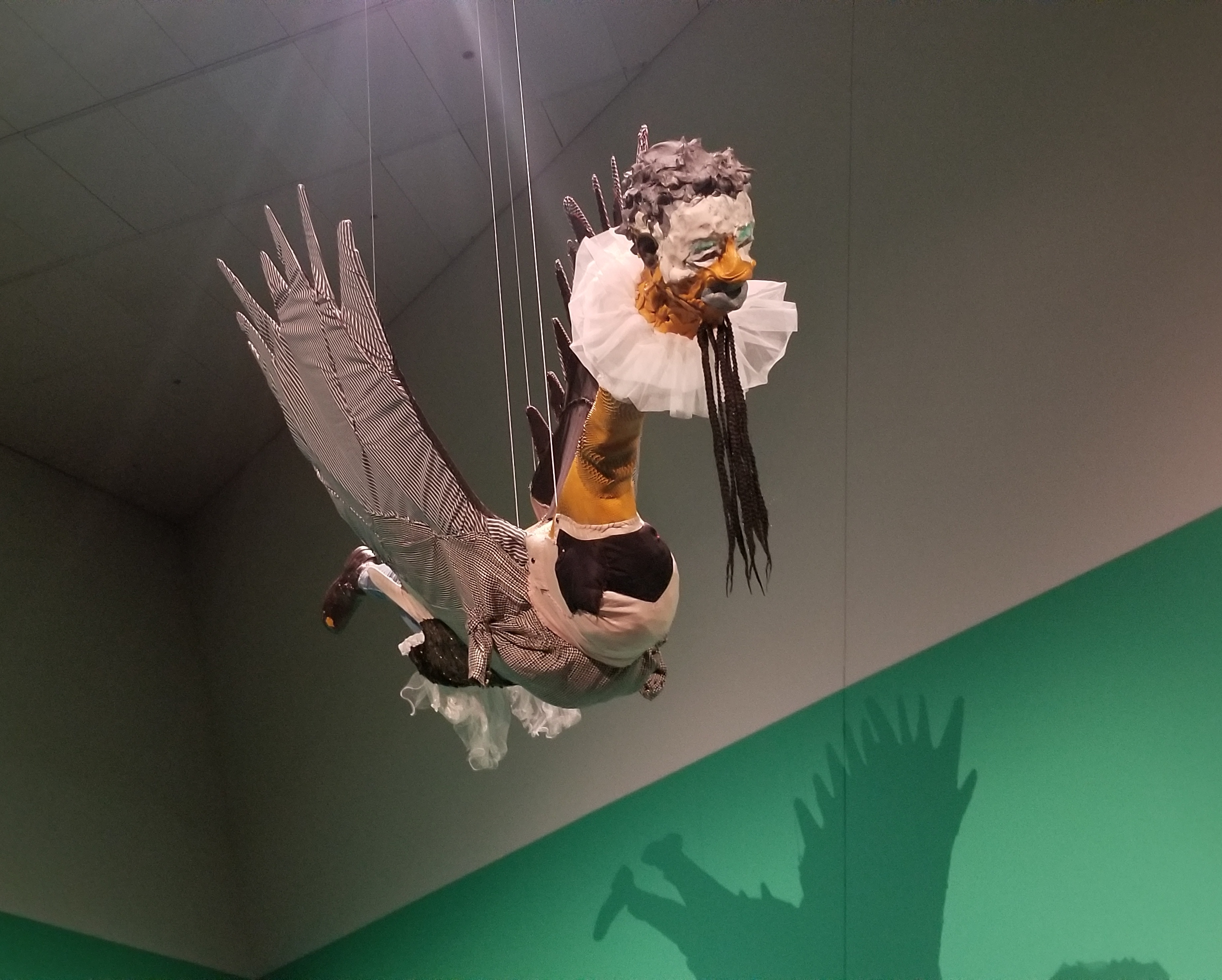
Oracles of the Pink Universe by Simphiwe Ndzube, 2021

Major universities and tertiary institutions offer Fine Art, Music, Photography, and other creative disciplines:

- Nelson Mandela Metropolitan University
- Michaelis School of Fine Art, University of Cape Town
- North-West University

== See also ==
- Culture of South Africa
- List of South African artists
- South Africa
- Outline of South Africa
