= Peace Mabe =

South African politician

Peace Mabe MP

Member of the National Assembly of South Africa
- Incumbent
- Assumed office 24 February 2017
- In office 21 May 2014 – 6 August 2016

Permanent delegate to the National Council of Provinces
- In office 7 May 2009 – 21 April 2014

Personal details
- Born: Bertha Peace Mabe; 18 September 1976 (age 50) Magaliesburg, Transvaal Province, South African
- Party: African National Congress
- Education: University of Pretoria
- Occupation: Member of Parliament
- Profession: Politician

Bertha Peace Mabe (born 18 September 1976) is a South African politician serving as a Member of the National Assembly of South Africa since February 2017, as well as the Deputy Minister of Sport, Arts and Culture since 3 July 2024. She previously served in the National Assembly from May 2014 until August 2016. She served as a permanent delegate to the National Council of Provinces from Gauteng between May 2009 and April 2014. Mabe is a member of the African National Congress and the party's unsuccessful 2016 Mogale City mayoral candidate.

== Early life and education ==
Mabe was born on 18 September 1976 in Magaliesburg, West Rand in the former Transvaal Province. She studied at the University of Pretoria, where she obtained a bachelor's degree and an honours degree in public administration.

== Political career ==
Mabe is a member of the African National Congress. Following the 2009 general election, Mabe was elected as a permanent delegate to the National Council of Provinces from Gauteng. She was sworn in as a Member of Parliament on 7 May 2009. She served as chairperson of the legislature's Select Committee on Women, Children and People with Disabilities.

After the 2014 general election, Mabe was sworn in as a Member of the National Assembly. The ANC selected her as their candidate for chairperson of the Portfolio Committee on Public Administration. She was elected chairperson on 25 June 2014.

In June 2016, the ANC nominated her as their mayoral candidate for Mogale City ahead of the 2016 municipal elections. The ANC lost their majority on the council and Mabe lost to the Democratic Alliance's Lynn Pannall by just one vote on 18 August. She resigned as a councillor on 23 August. On 31 August, the Economic Freedom Fighters opened a fraud case against Mabe, because she was sworn in as a councillor despite her failing to resign as a Member of Parliament, as required by the constitution. Parliament later announced that her membership ceased on 6 August 2016, in accordance to section 47(3)(a) of the Constitution. Mabe returned to Parliament on 24 February 2017.

She was re-elected in May 2019 and now serves as co-chairperson of the Joint Standing Committee on the Financial Management of Parliament.
