= Lake Malawi Museum =

Local museum in Malawi

Coordinates: 14°2′13″S 34°49′36″E

Lake Malawi Museum is a museum on Lake Malawi in Malawi. Situated in the Old Gymkhana Club and organized by the Society of Malawi since 1971 (and likely not updated since then), the museum is located near the Queen Victoria memorial near the Bakili Muluzi Bridge in Mangochi town, Mangochi District, within the Southern Region of Malawi.

== Gallery ==
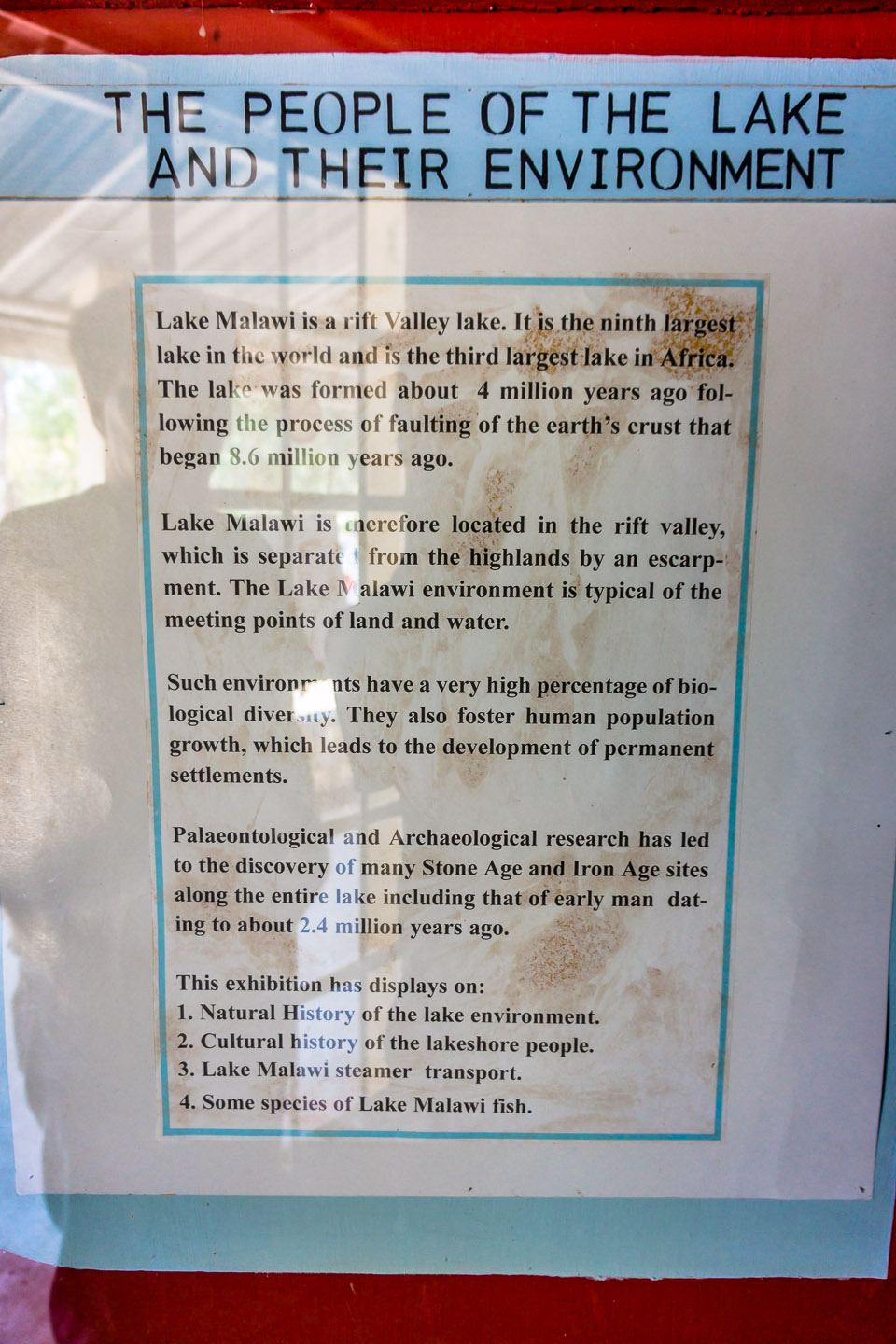
Introduction to the people of the Lake Malawi region (as seen from entrance at the Lake Malawi Museum)

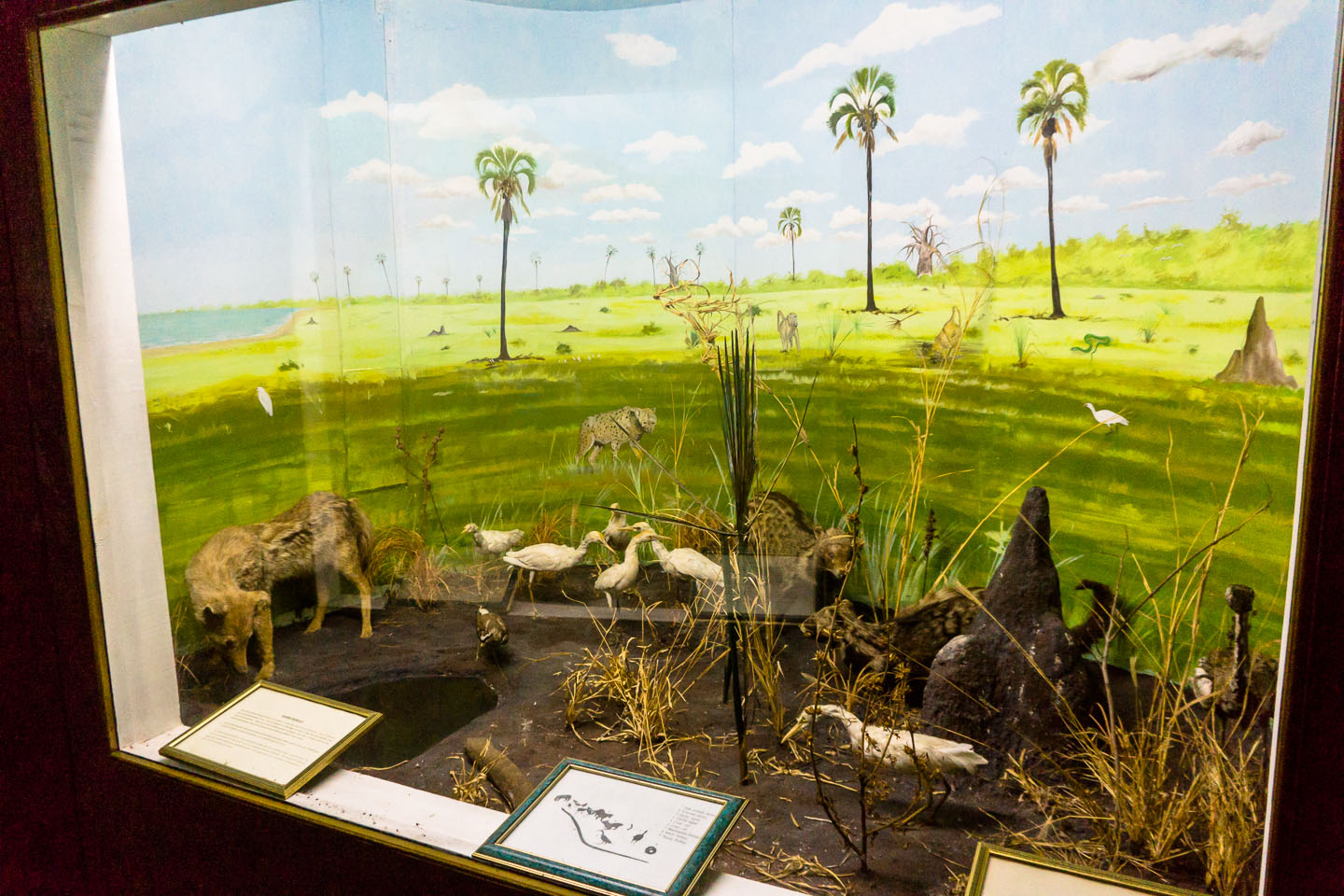
Mammals of Lake Malawi area exhibit

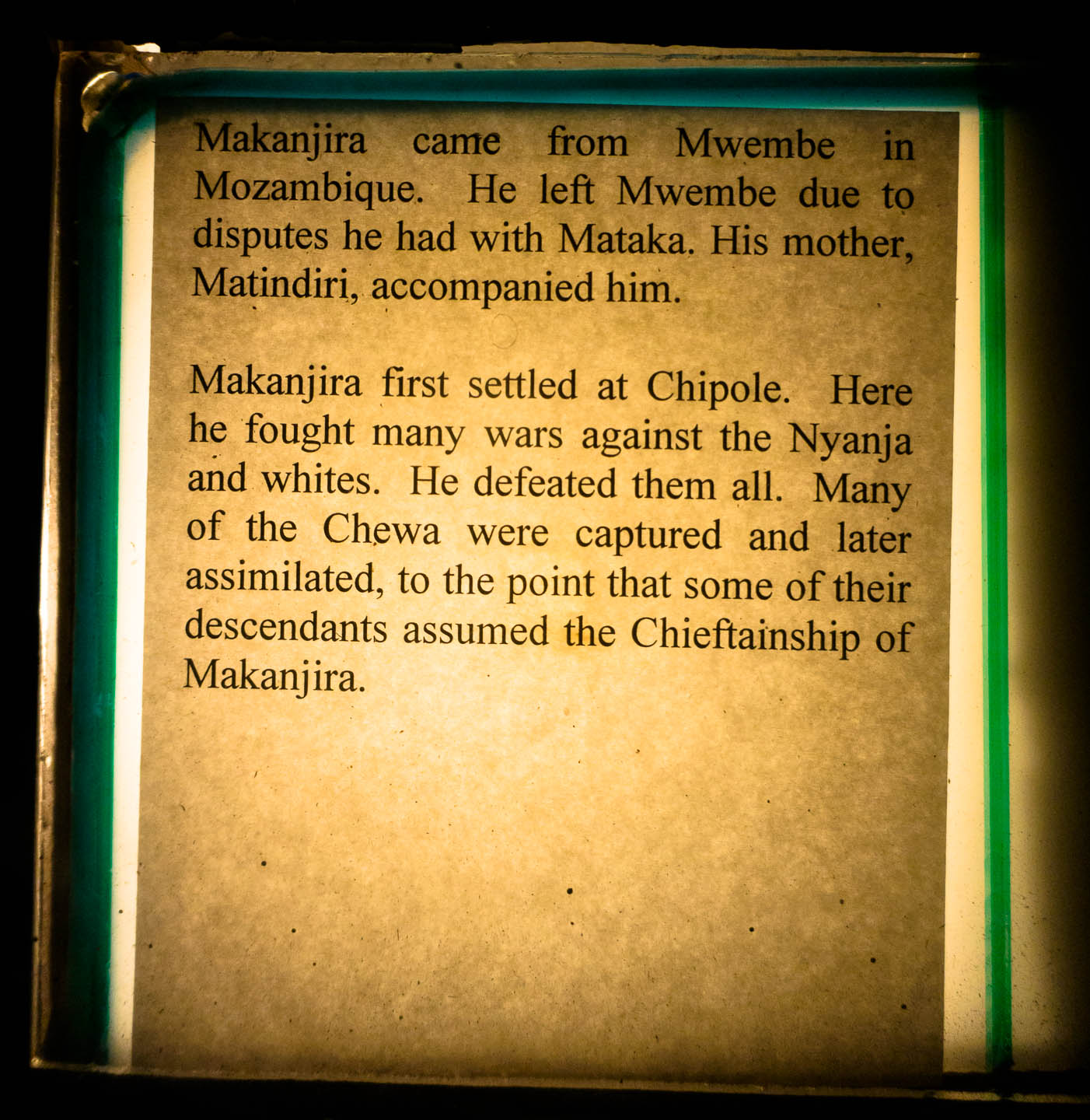
History of the Yao people (1)

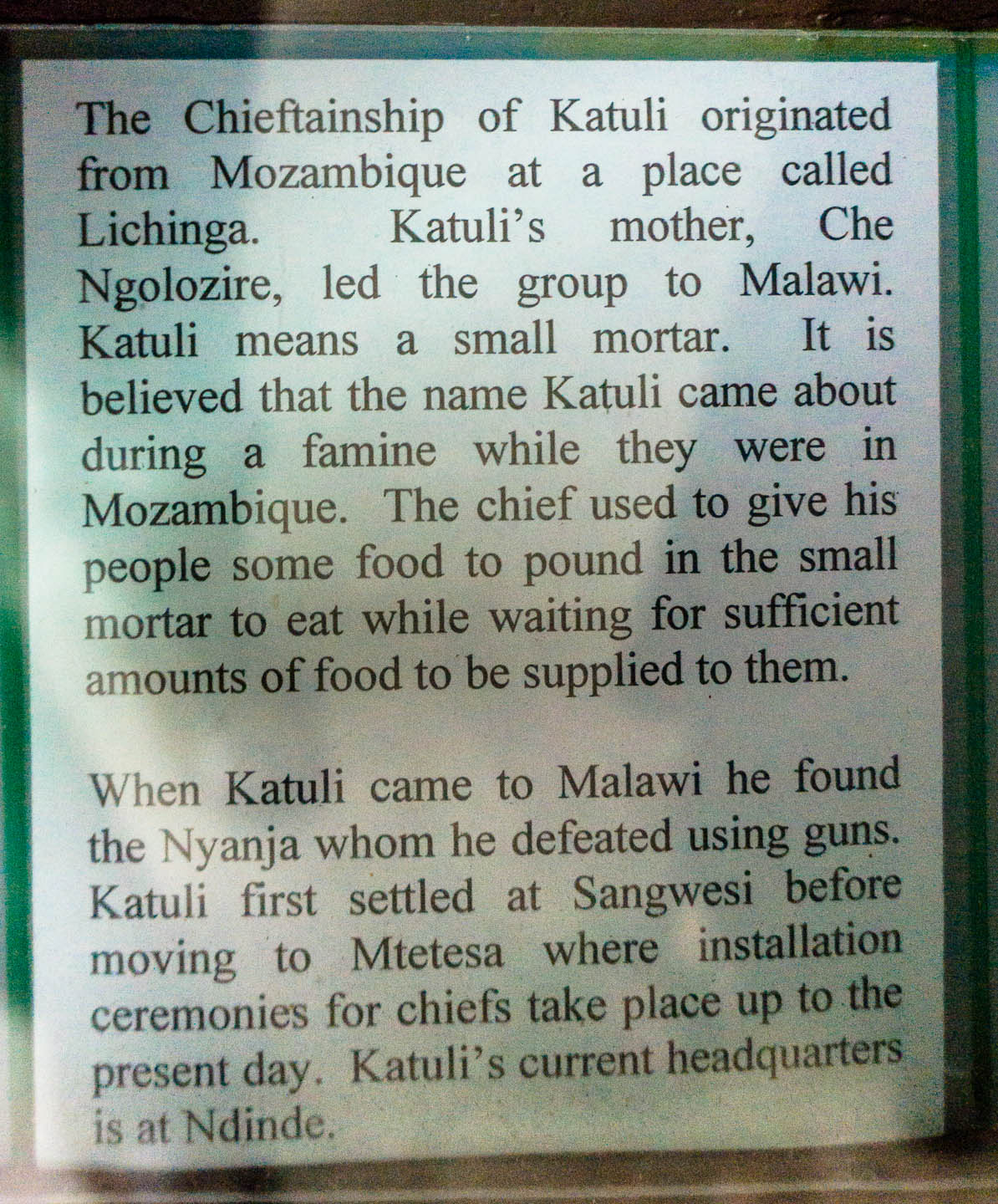
History of the Yao people (2)

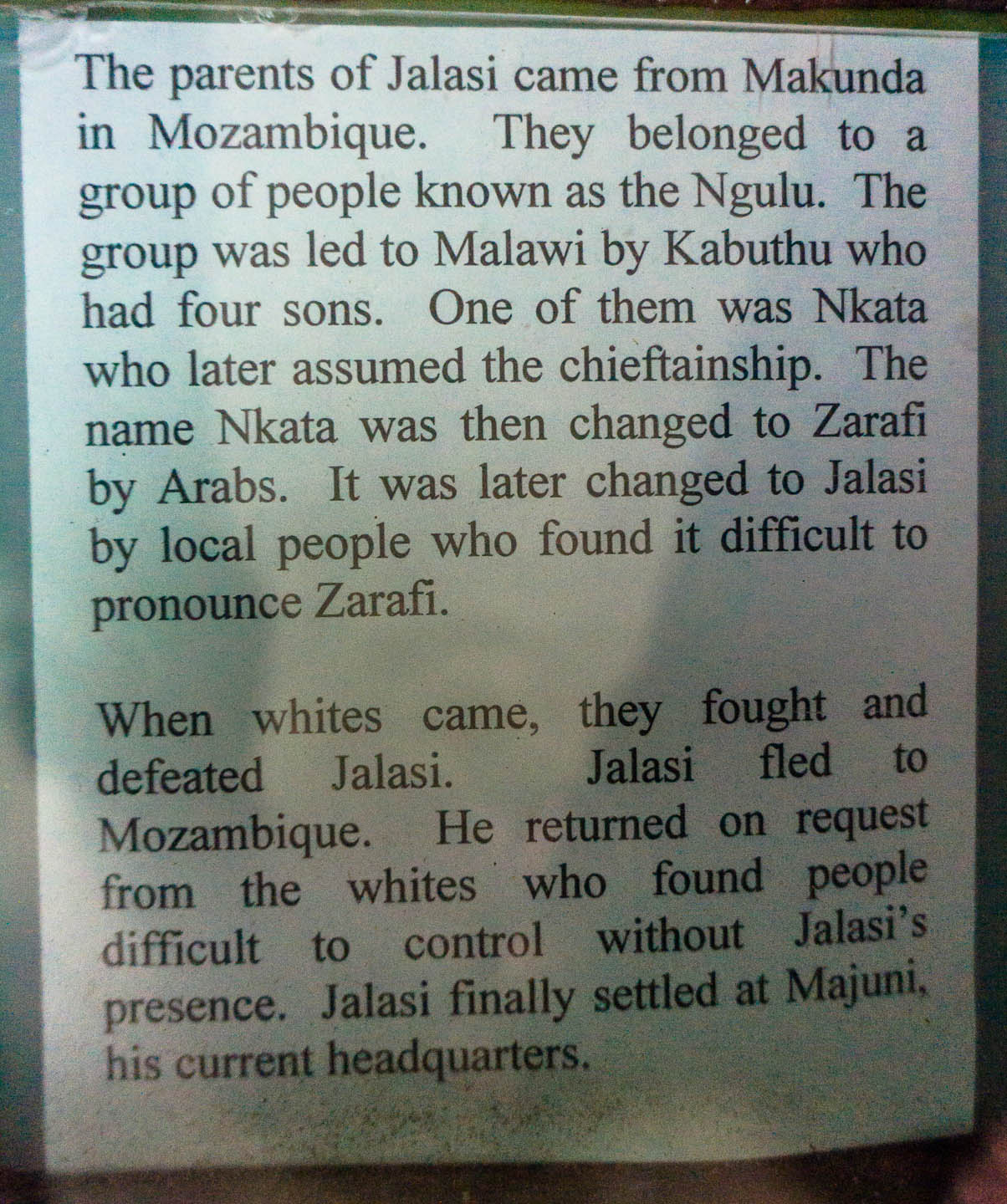
History of the Yao people (3)

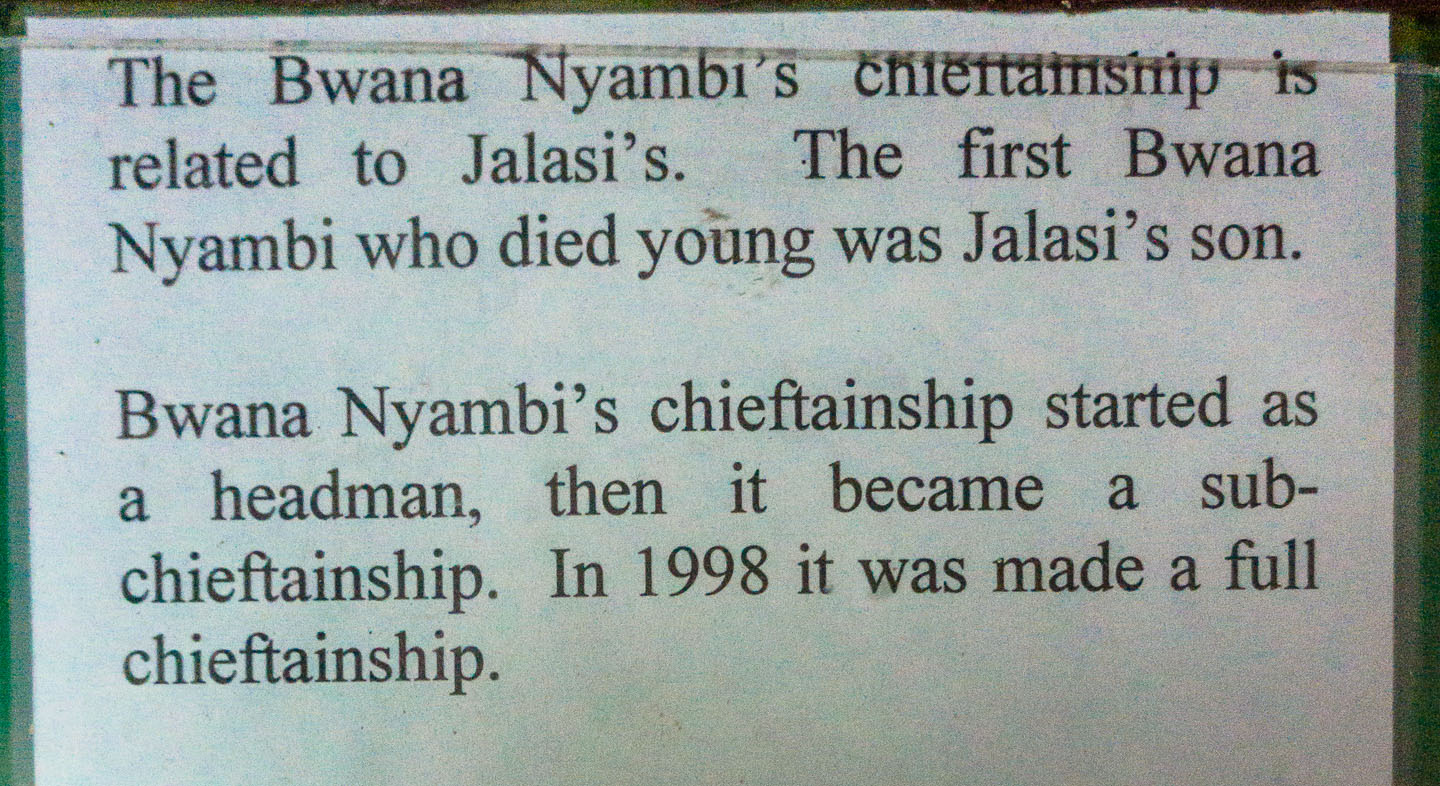
History of the Yao people (4)

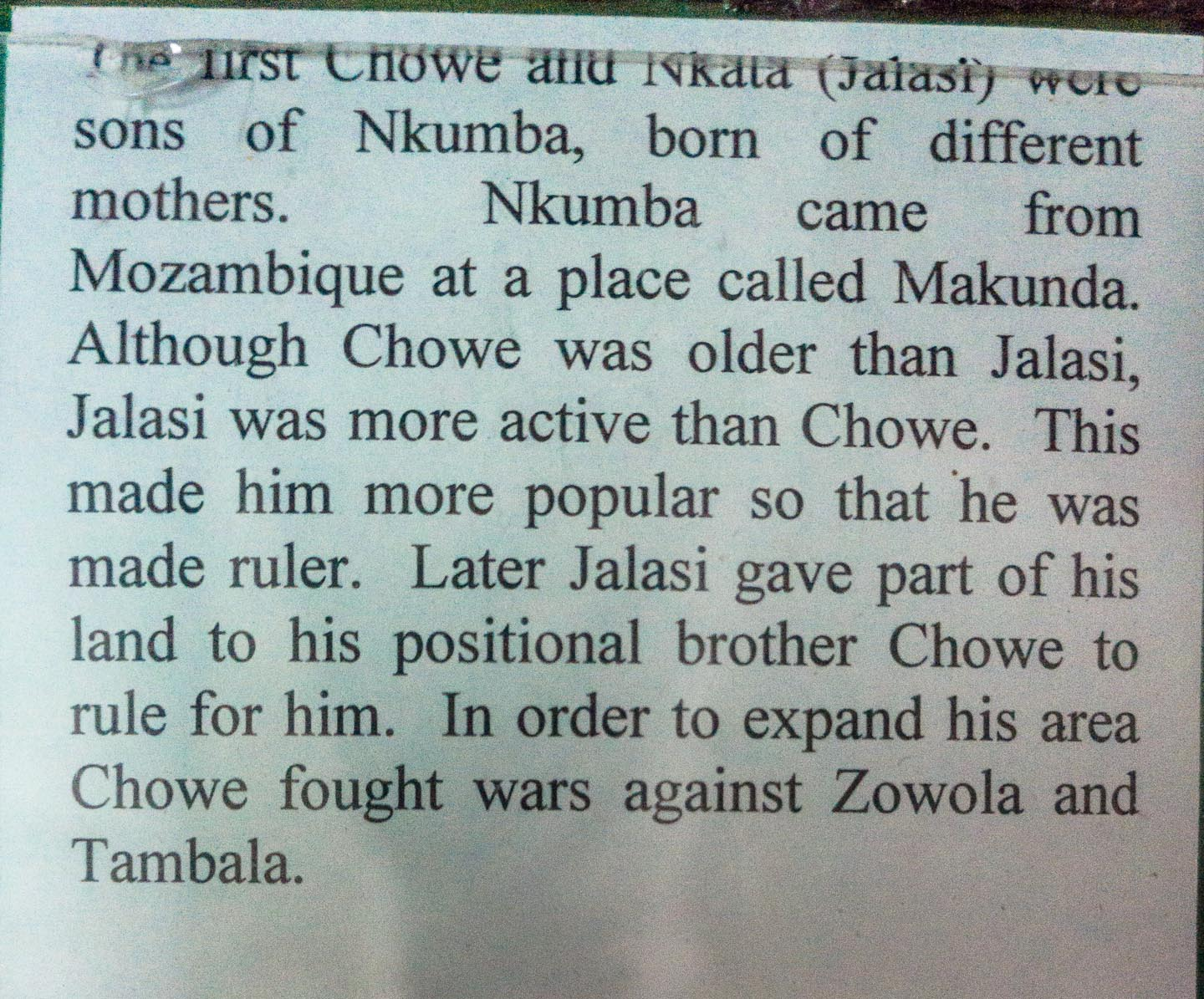
History of the Yao people (5)

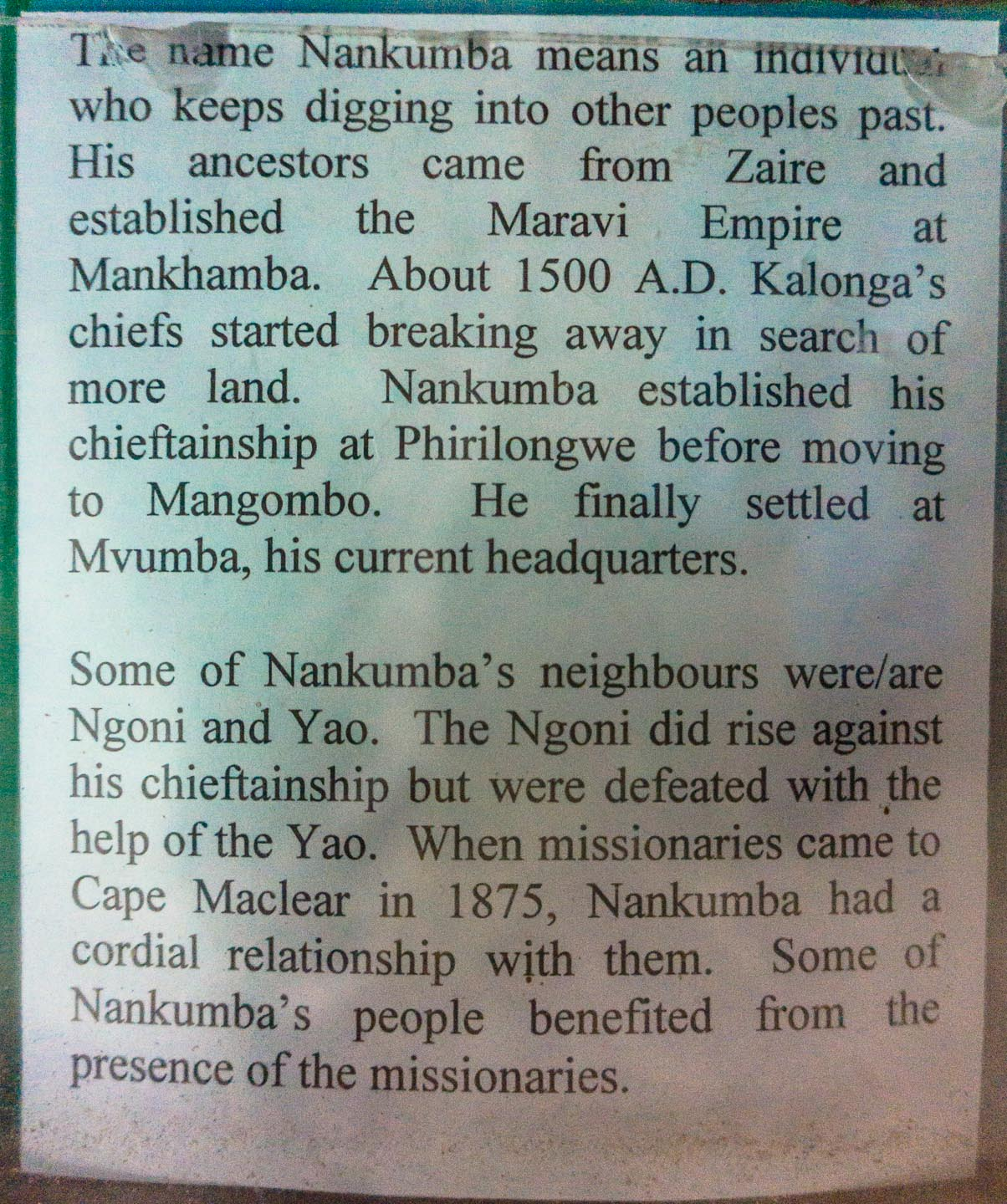
History of the Yao people (6)

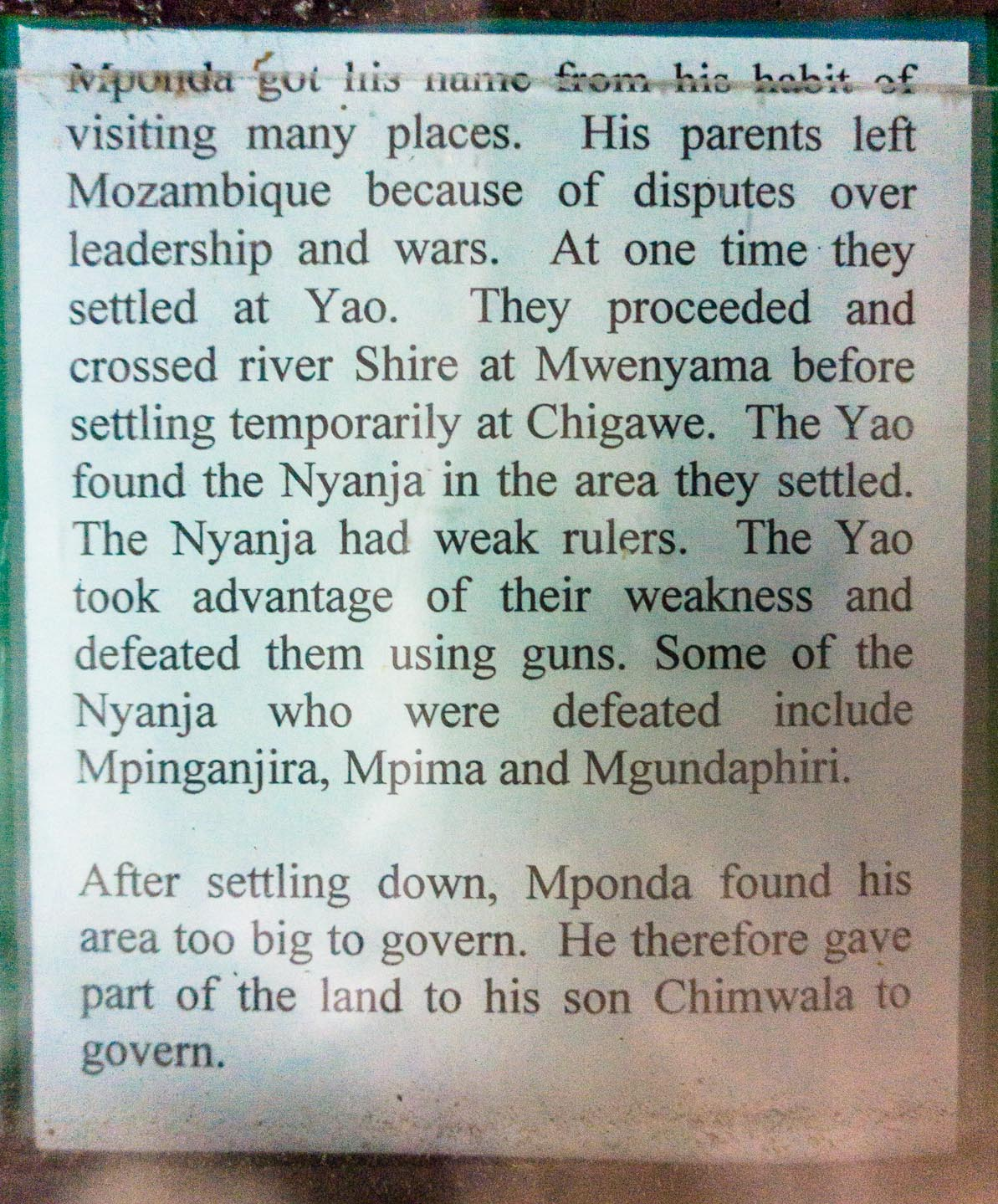
History of the Yao people (7)

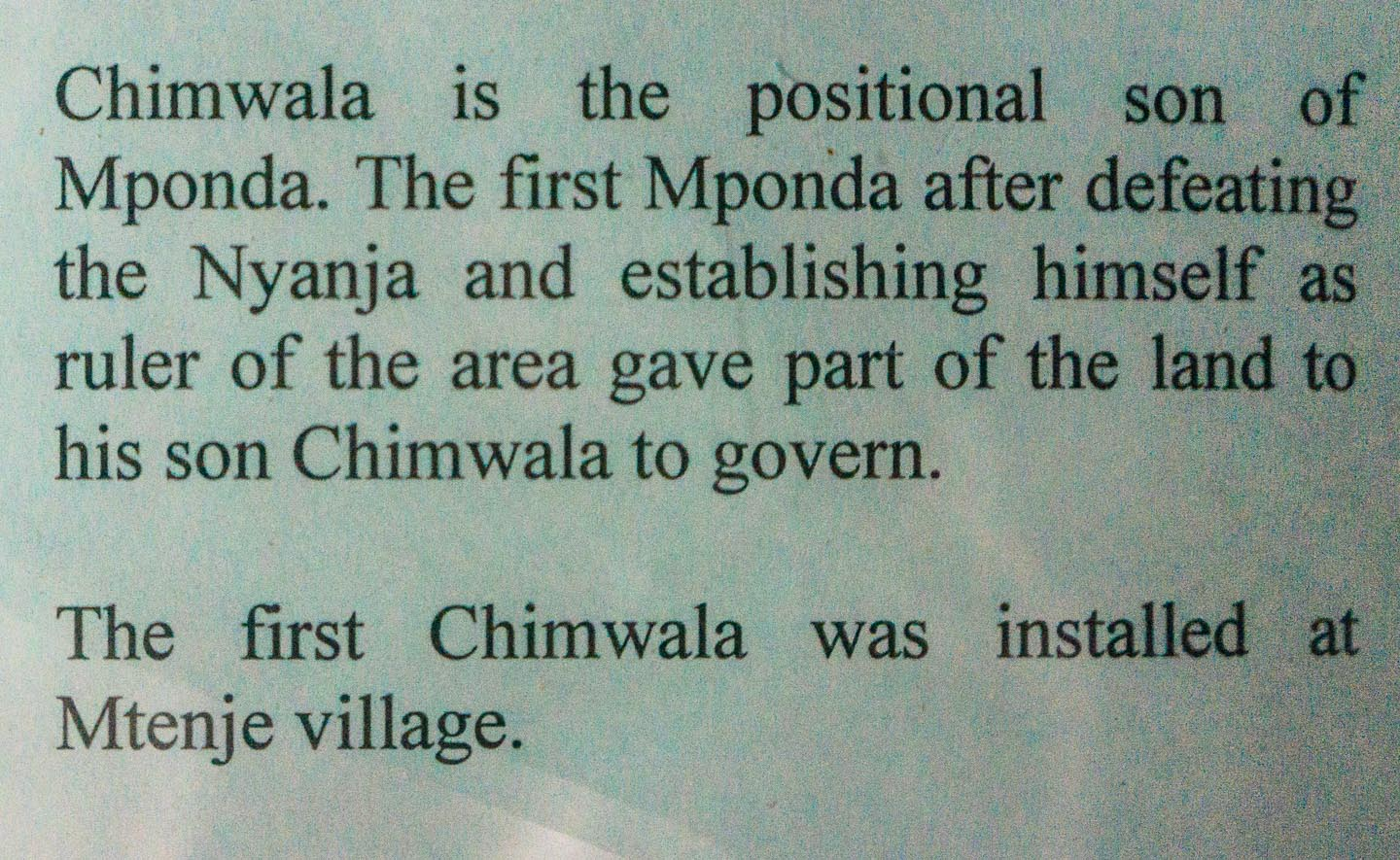
History of the Yao people (8)

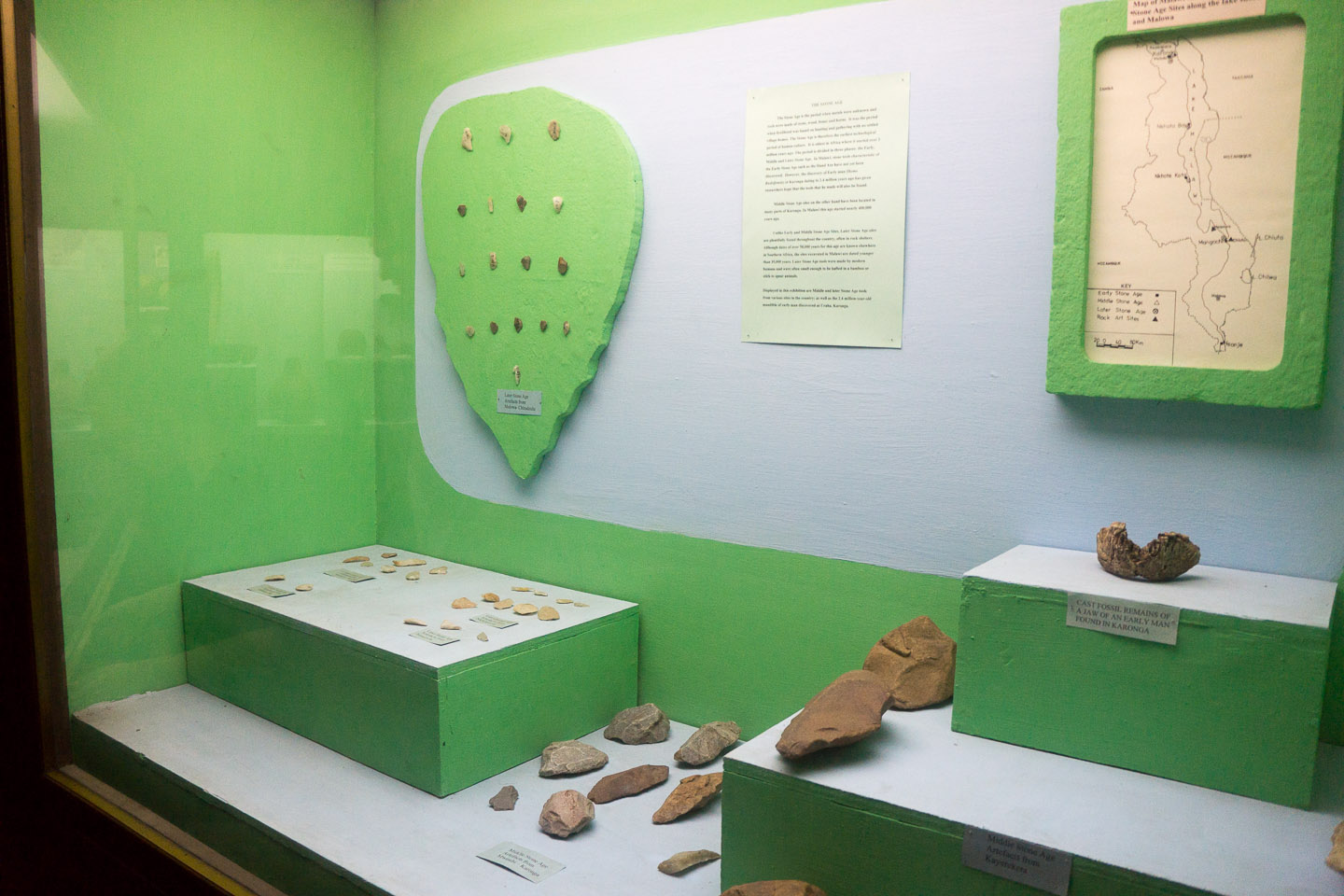
Exhibit of Stone Age artefacts

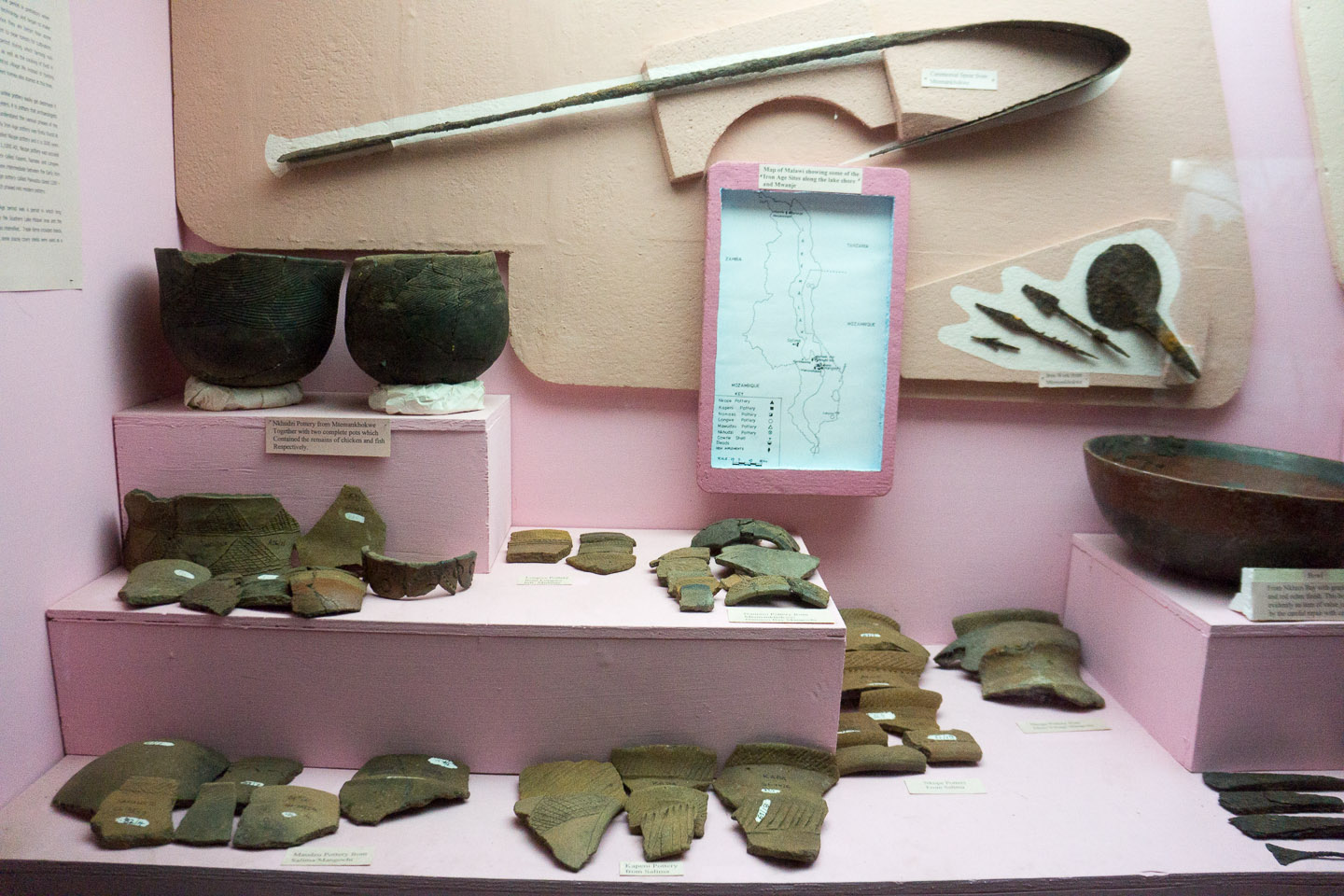
Exhibit of Iron Age, clay pots

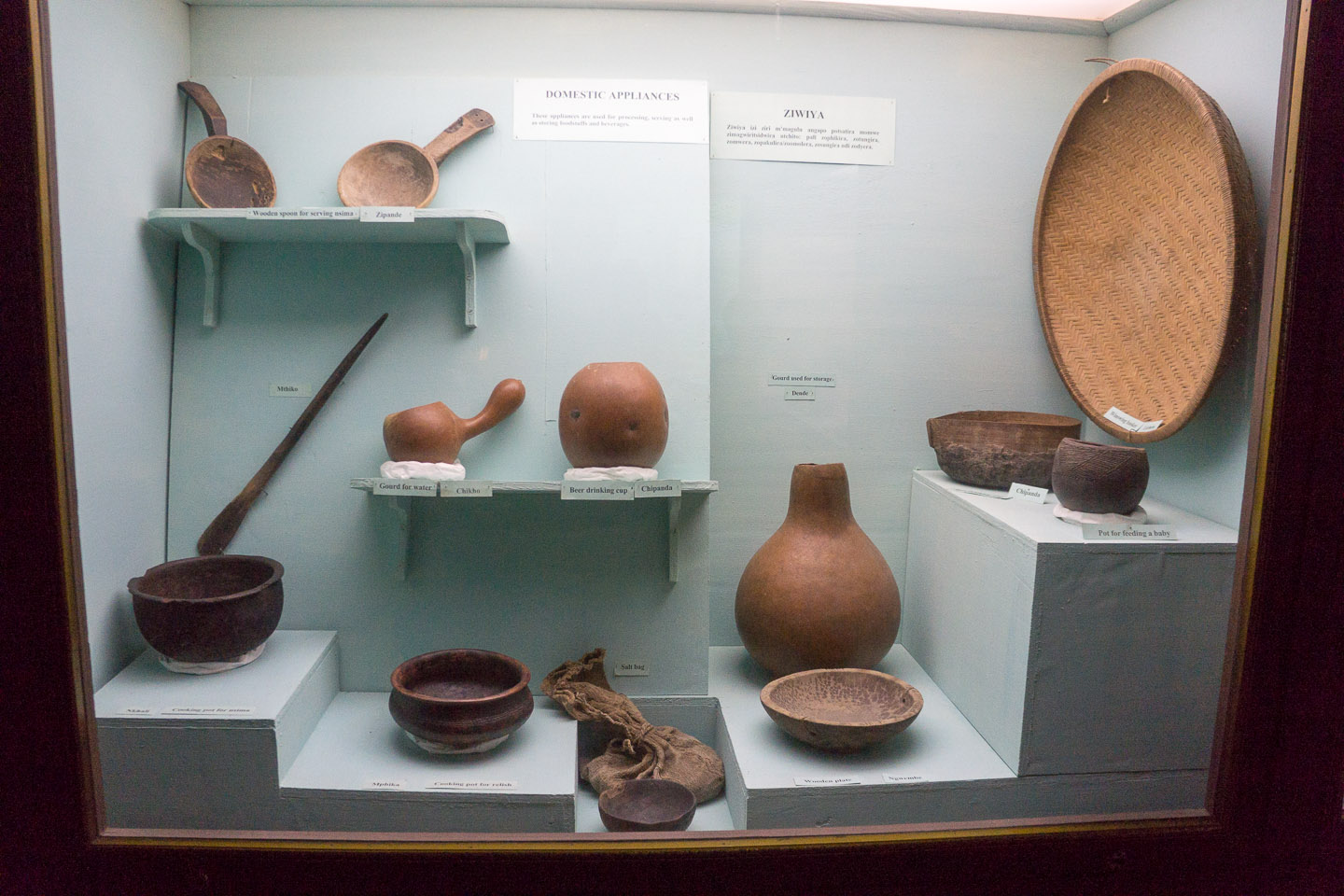
Exhibit of domestic appliances

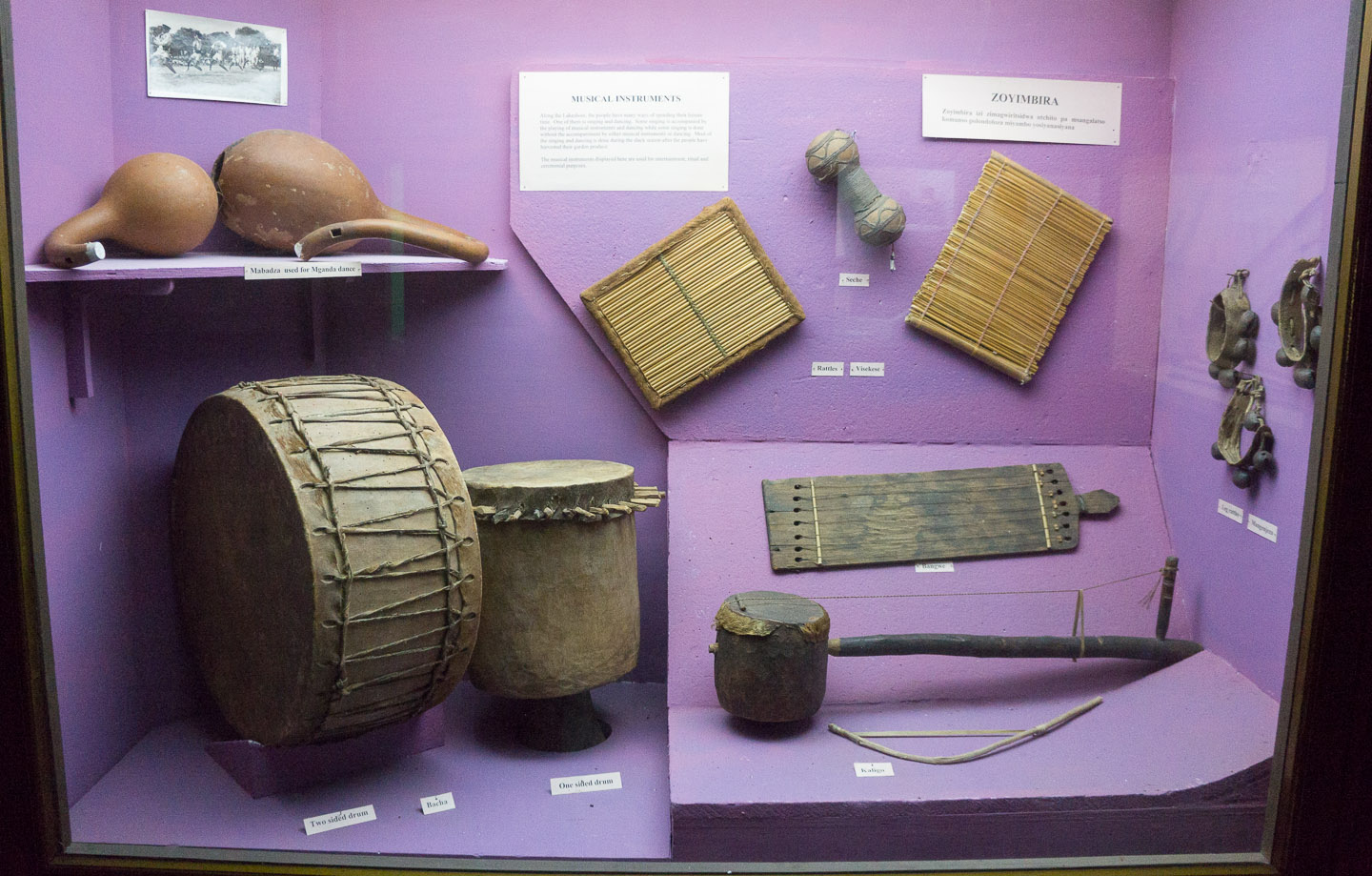
Exhibit of Musical Instruments

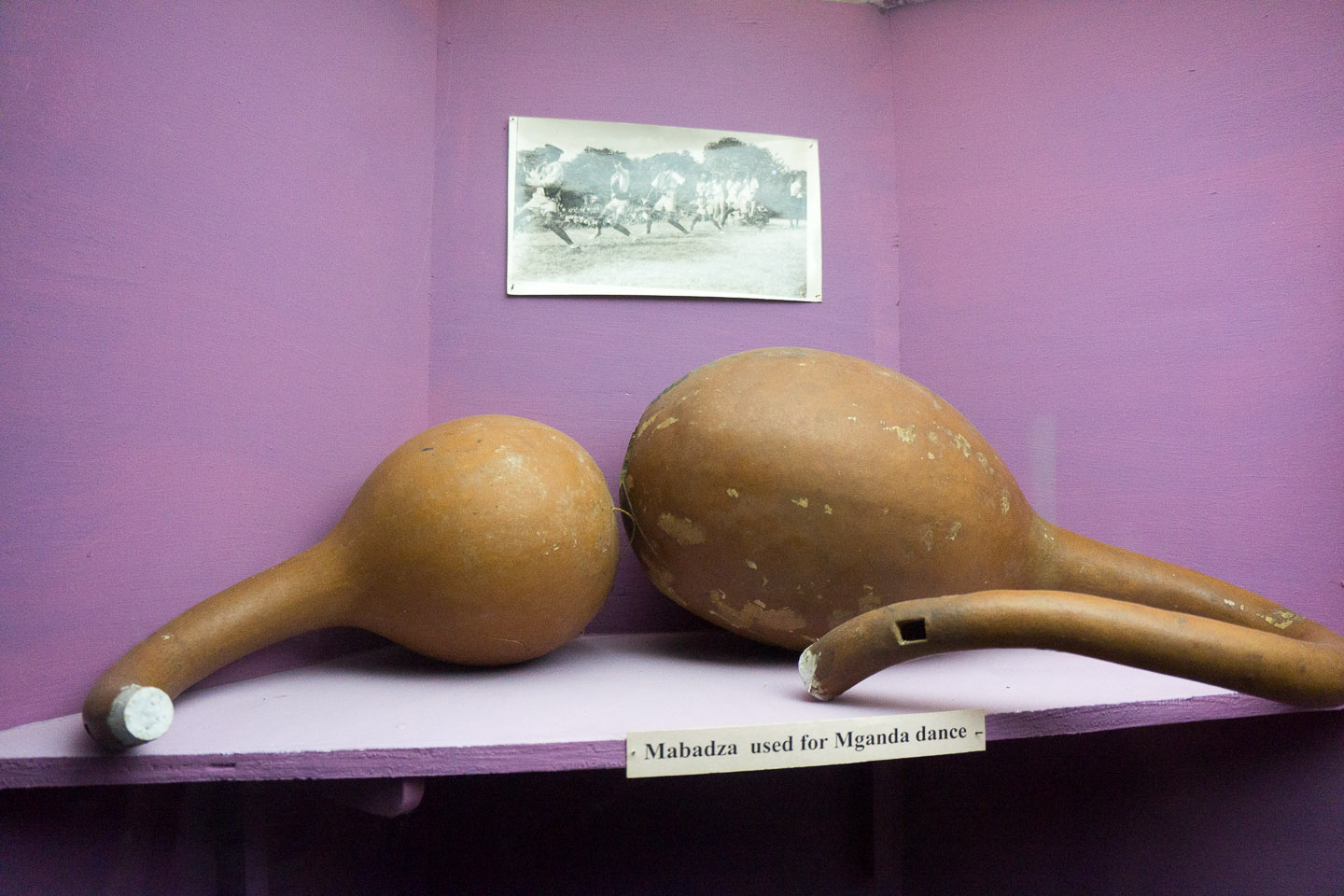
Mabadza for Mganda dance

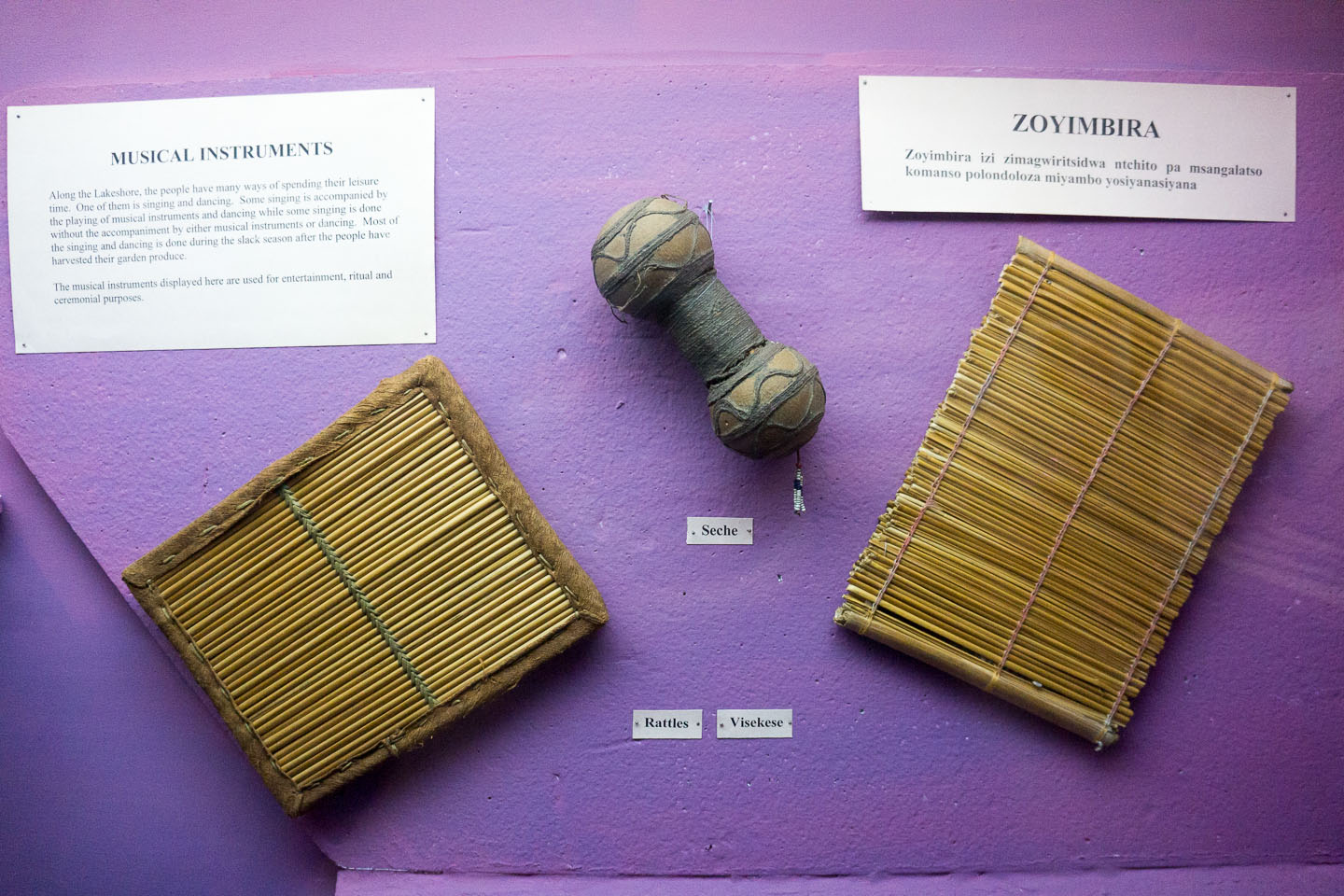
Musical rattles

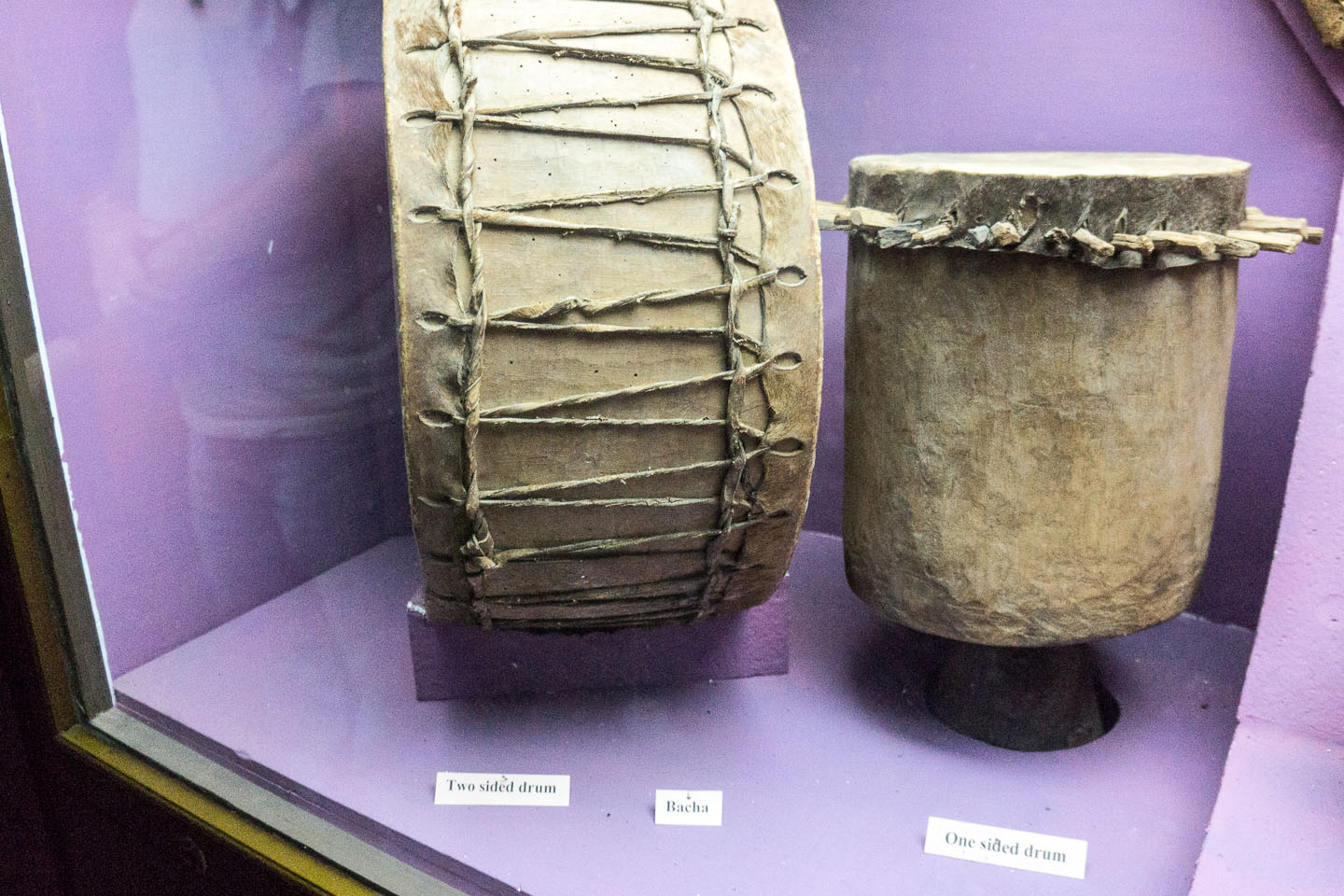
One sided and two sided drum

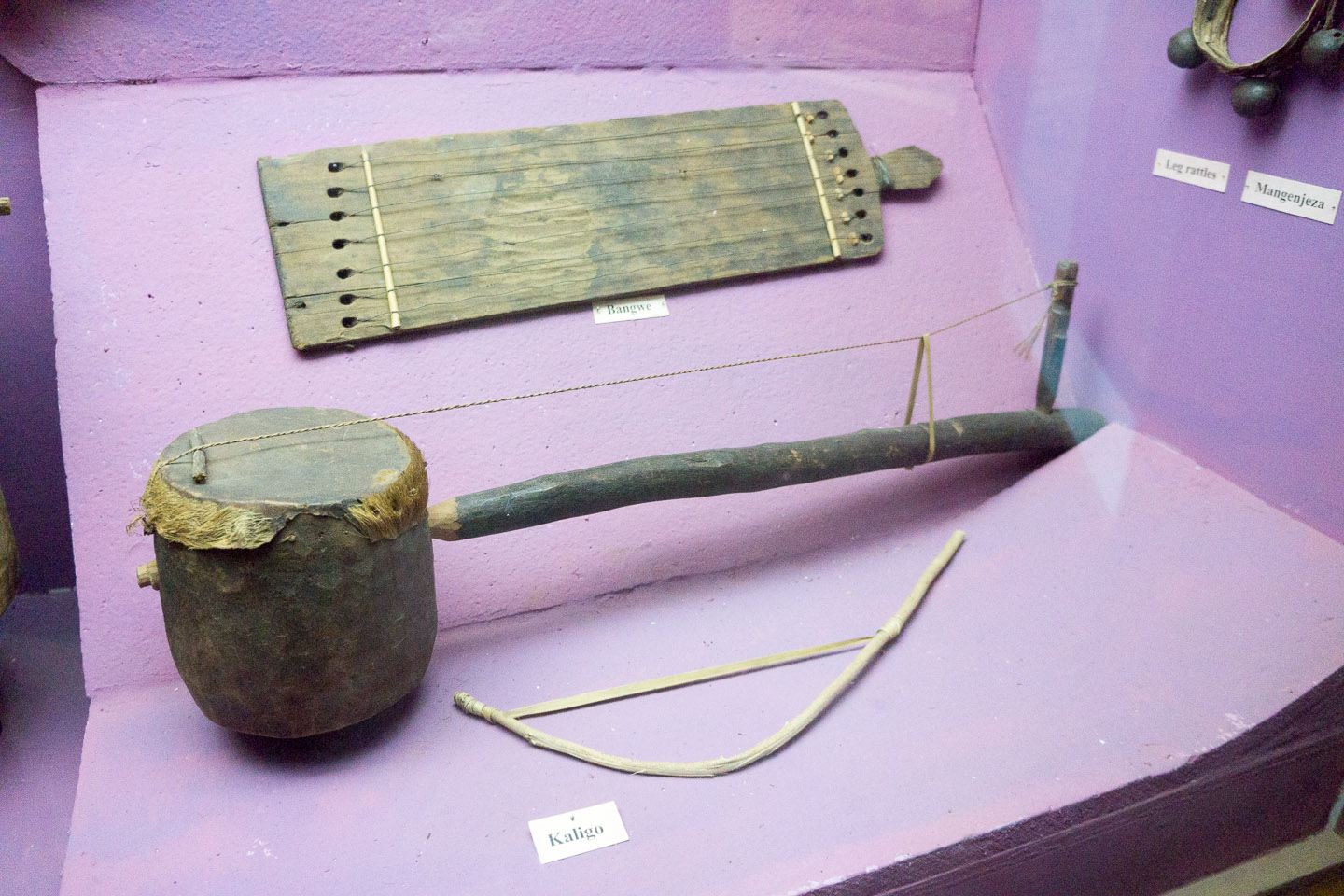
Traditional Yao musical instruments: Kaligo, Bangwe

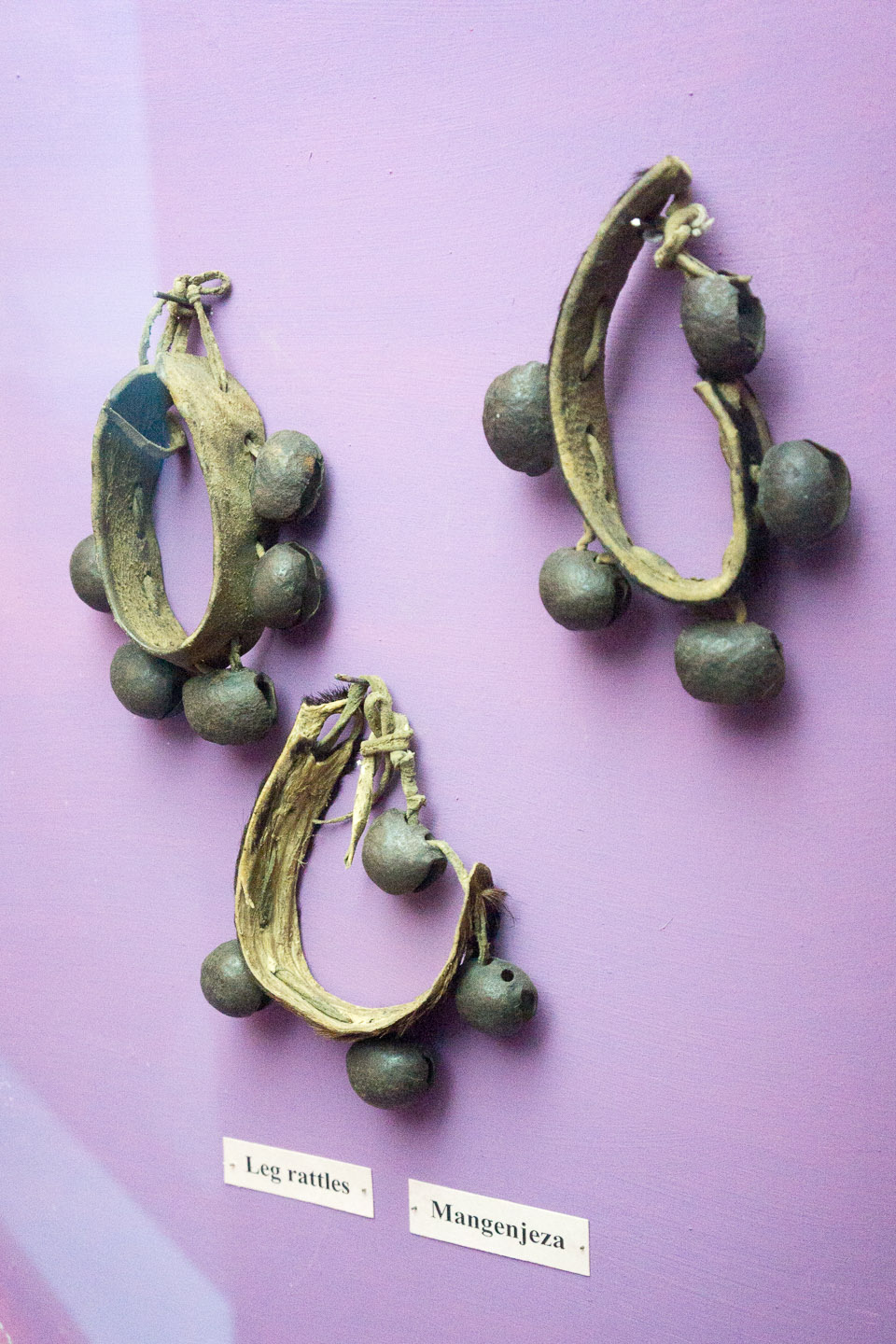
Leg rattles

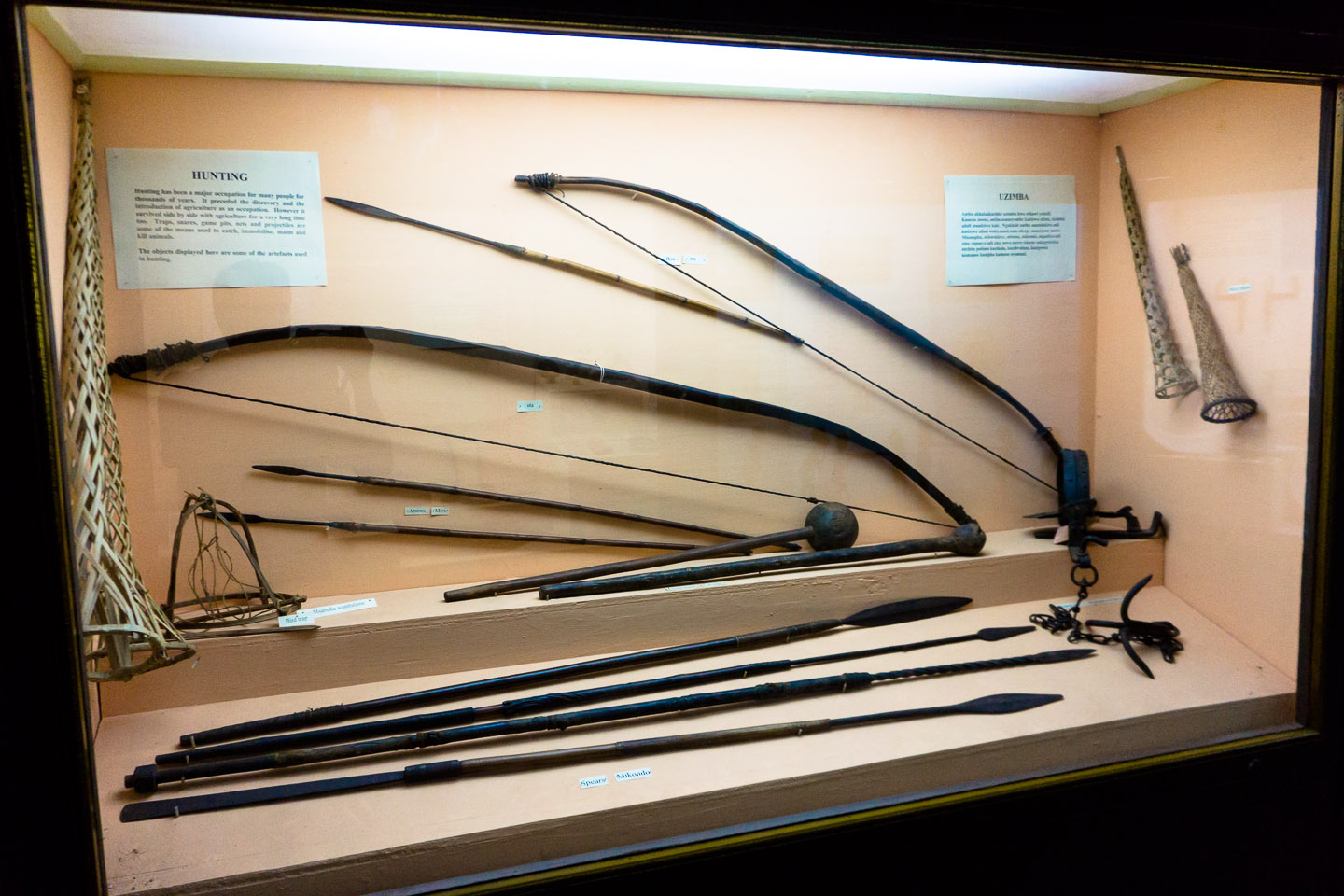
Exhibit of hunting weapons

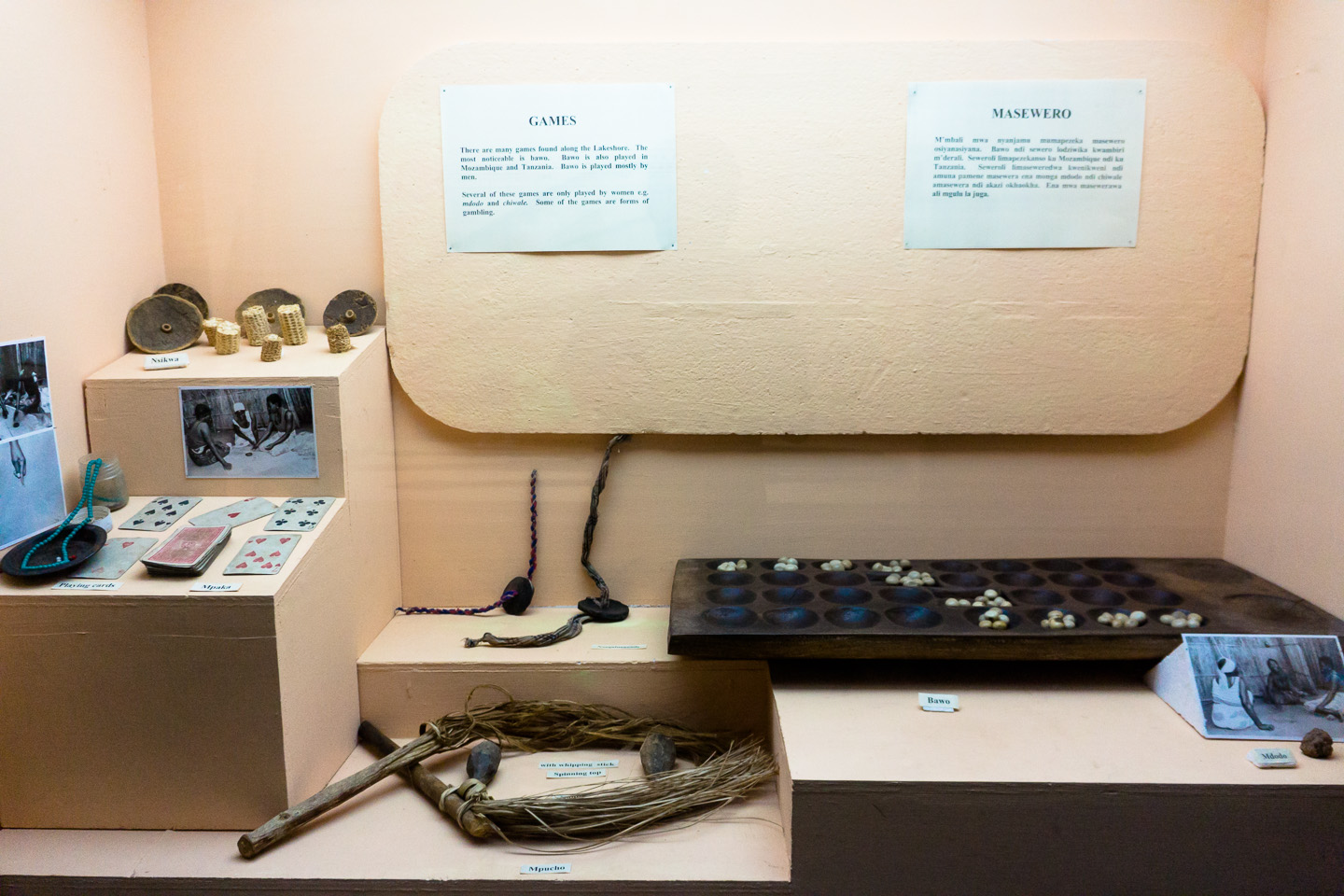
Traditional Games (bawo, mpaka, cards, nsikwa, mdodo, chiwale)

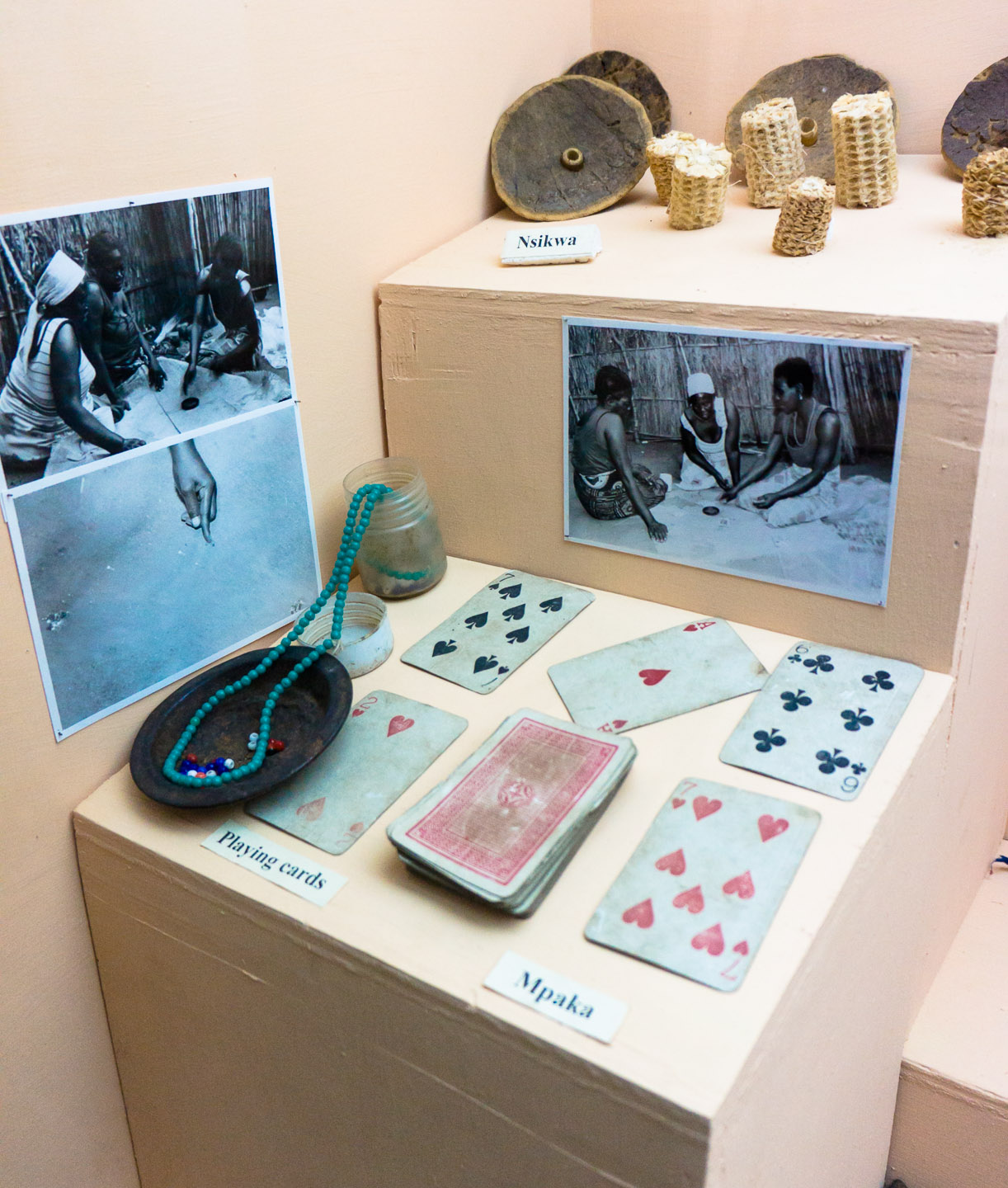
Traditional Games (close up shot of mpaka, cards, nsikwa)

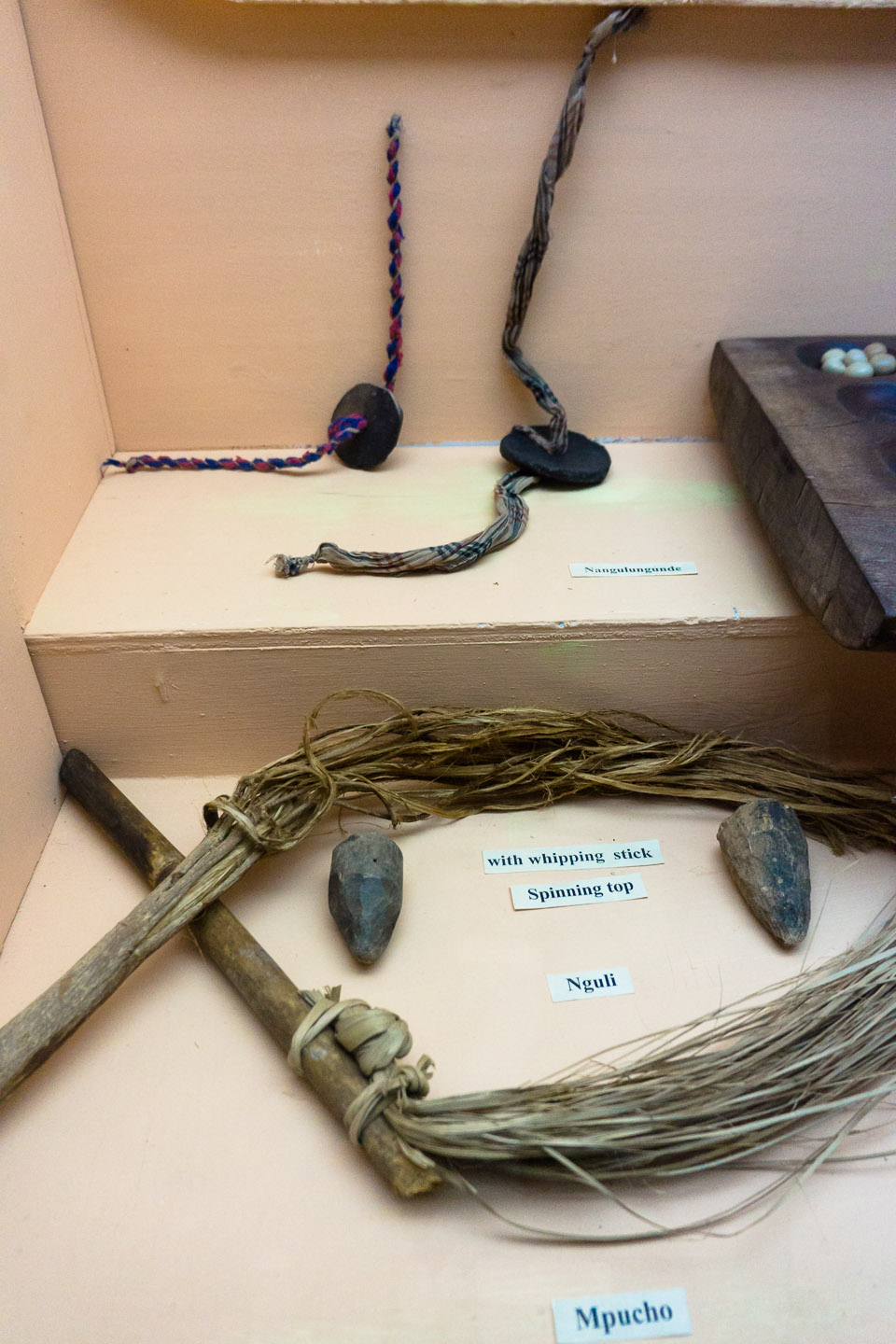
Exhibit of spinning top, nangulungunde

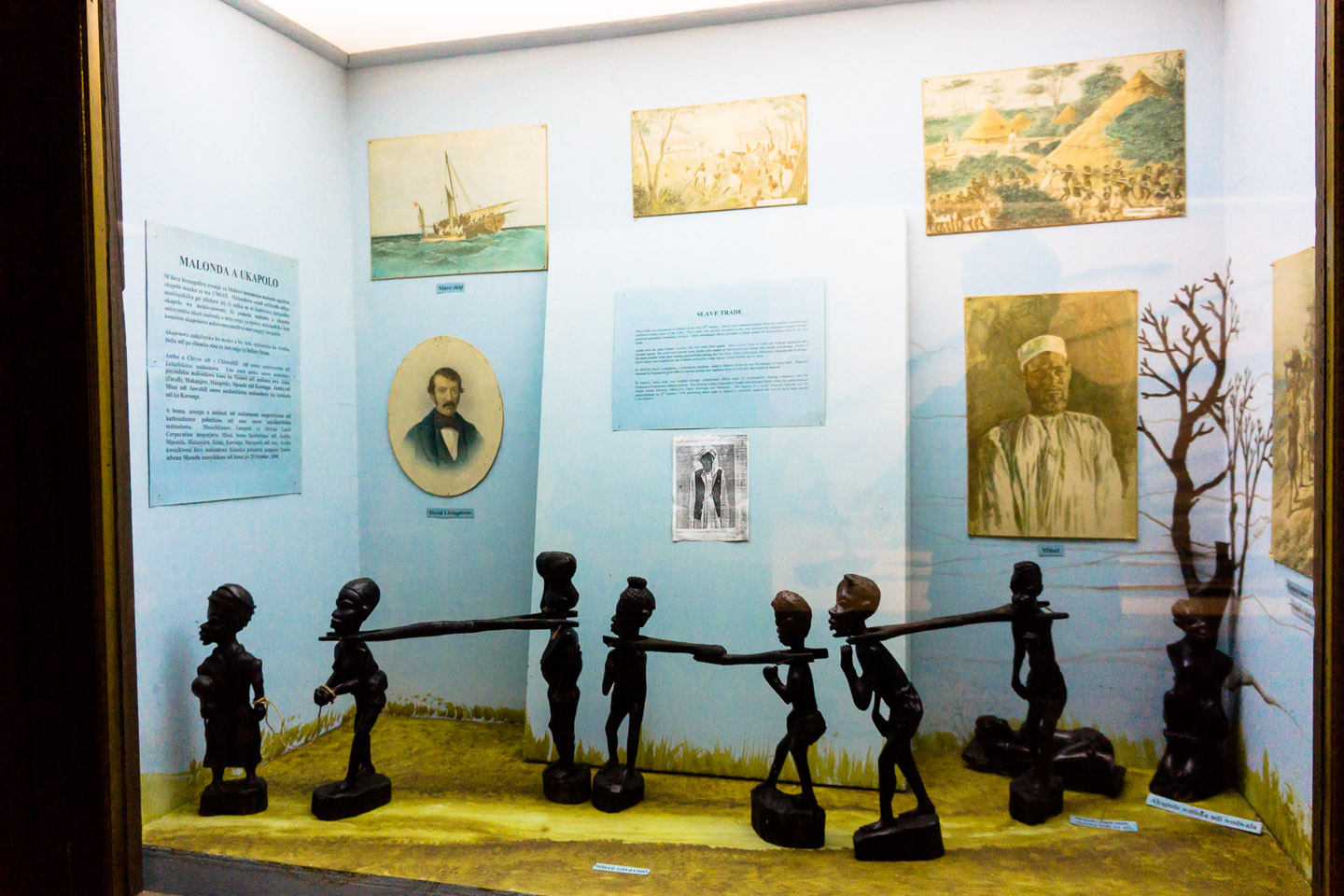
Exhibit showing slaving history

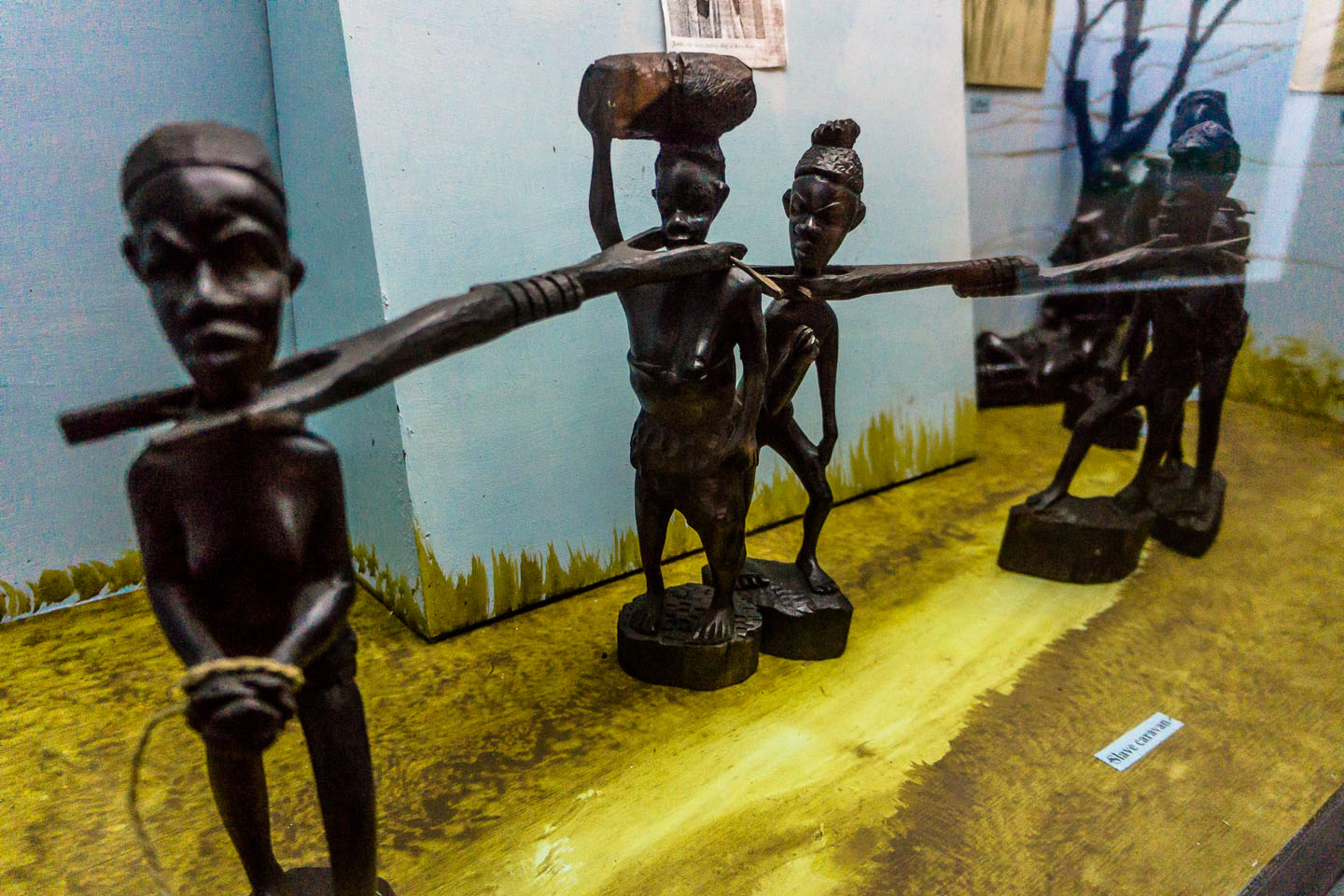
Carving of slave caravan

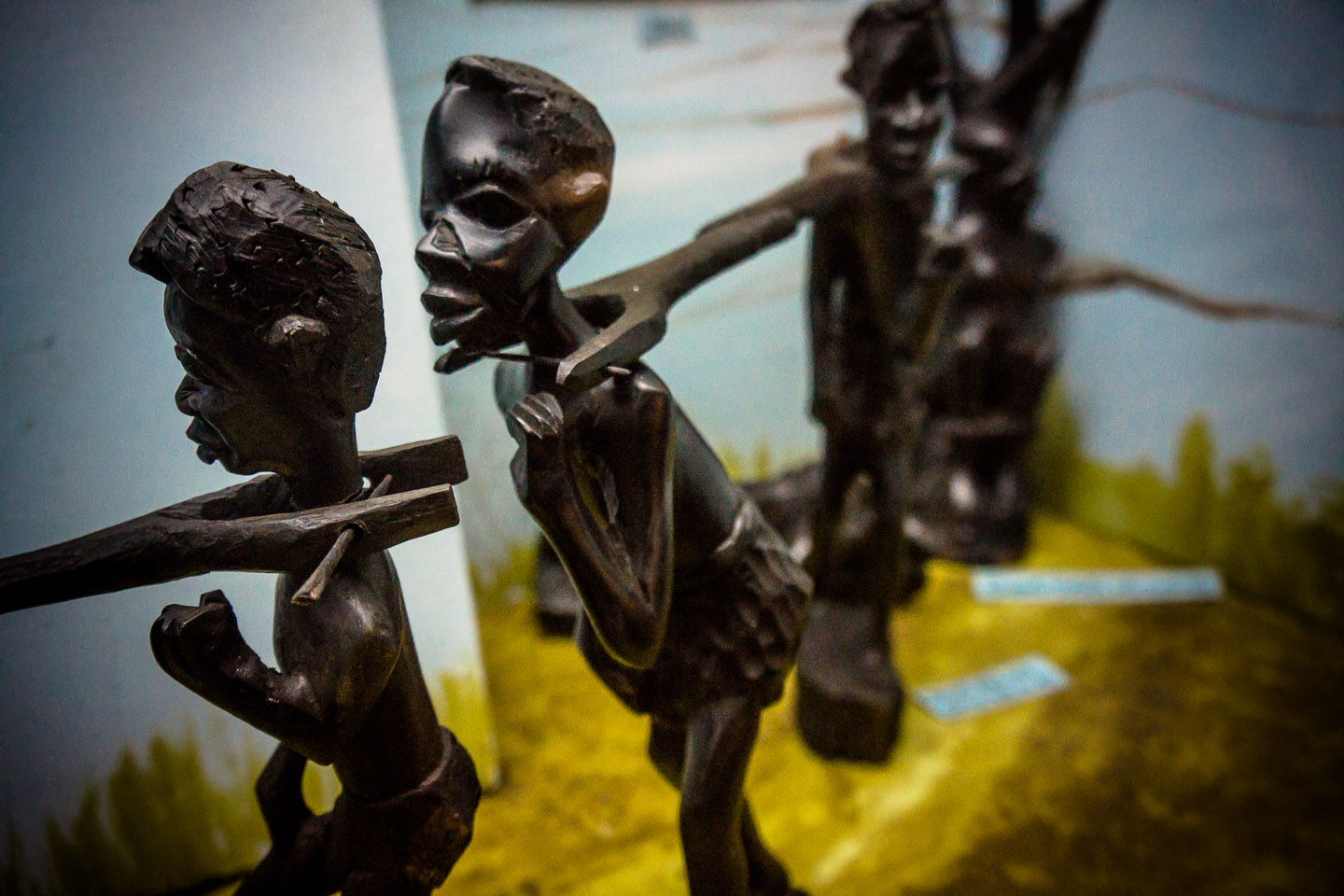
Carving of slave caravan, alternate

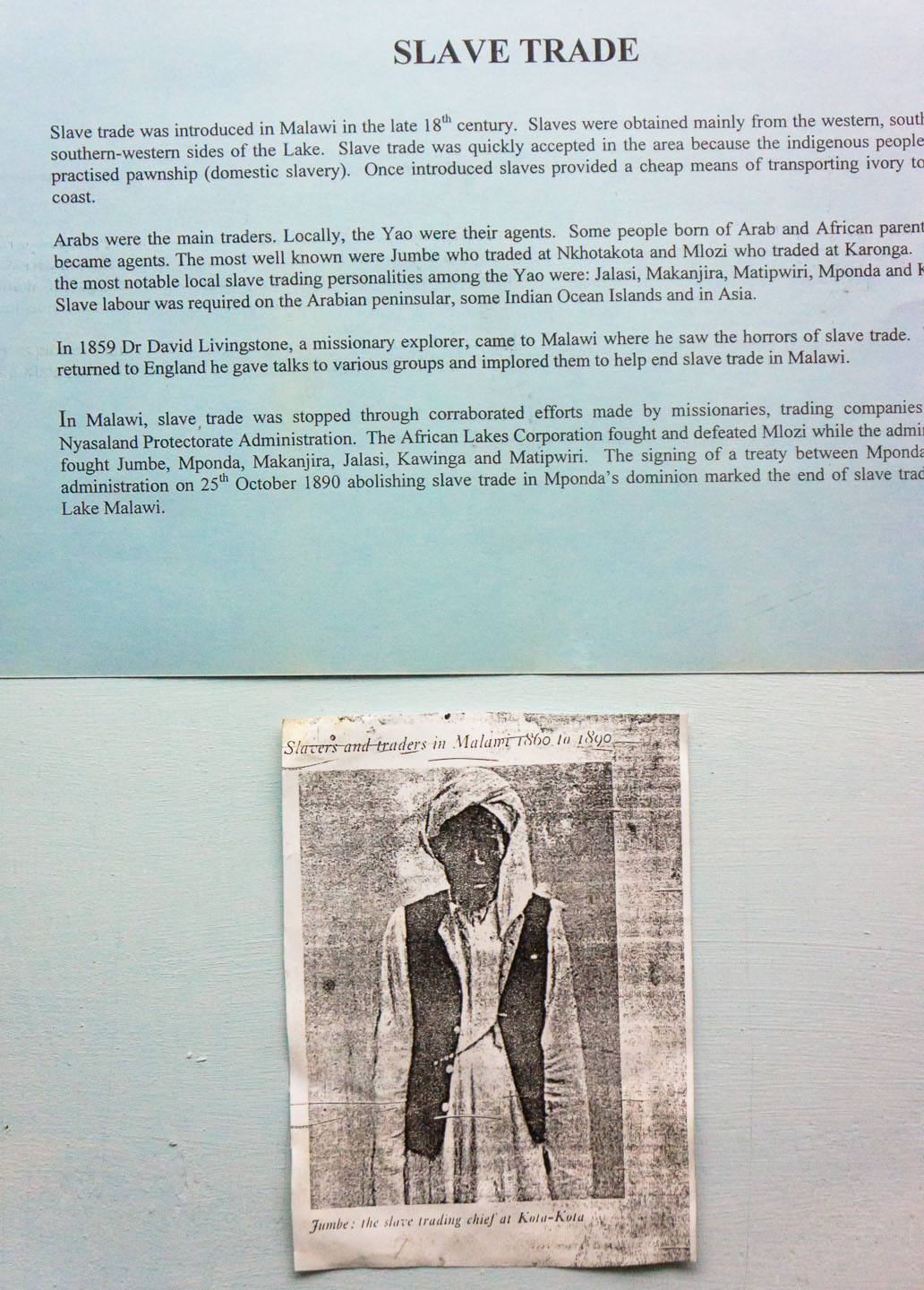
Jumbe and slave trading info

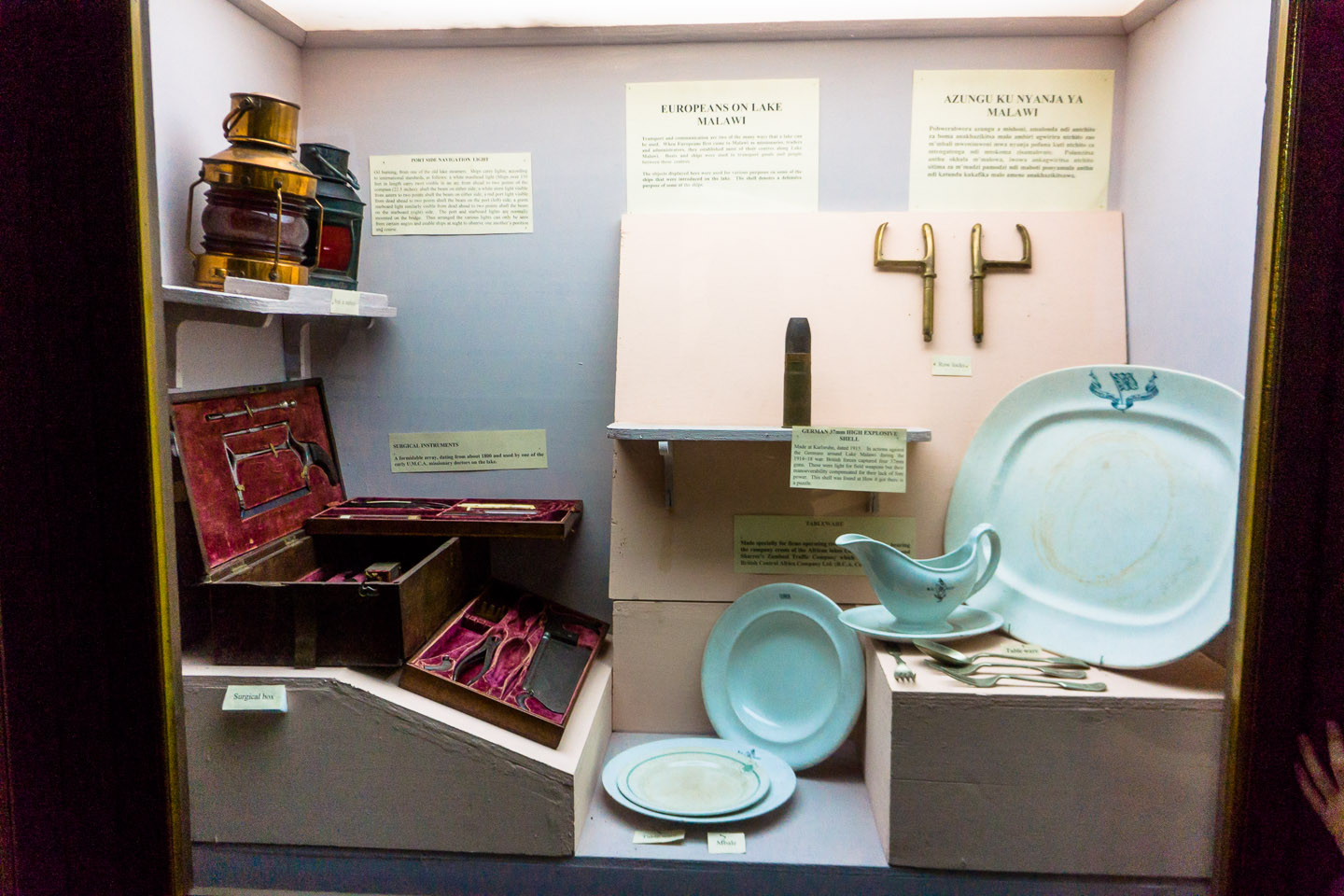
Navigation lights, medical kit, plates, shell from 37mm gun, row locks

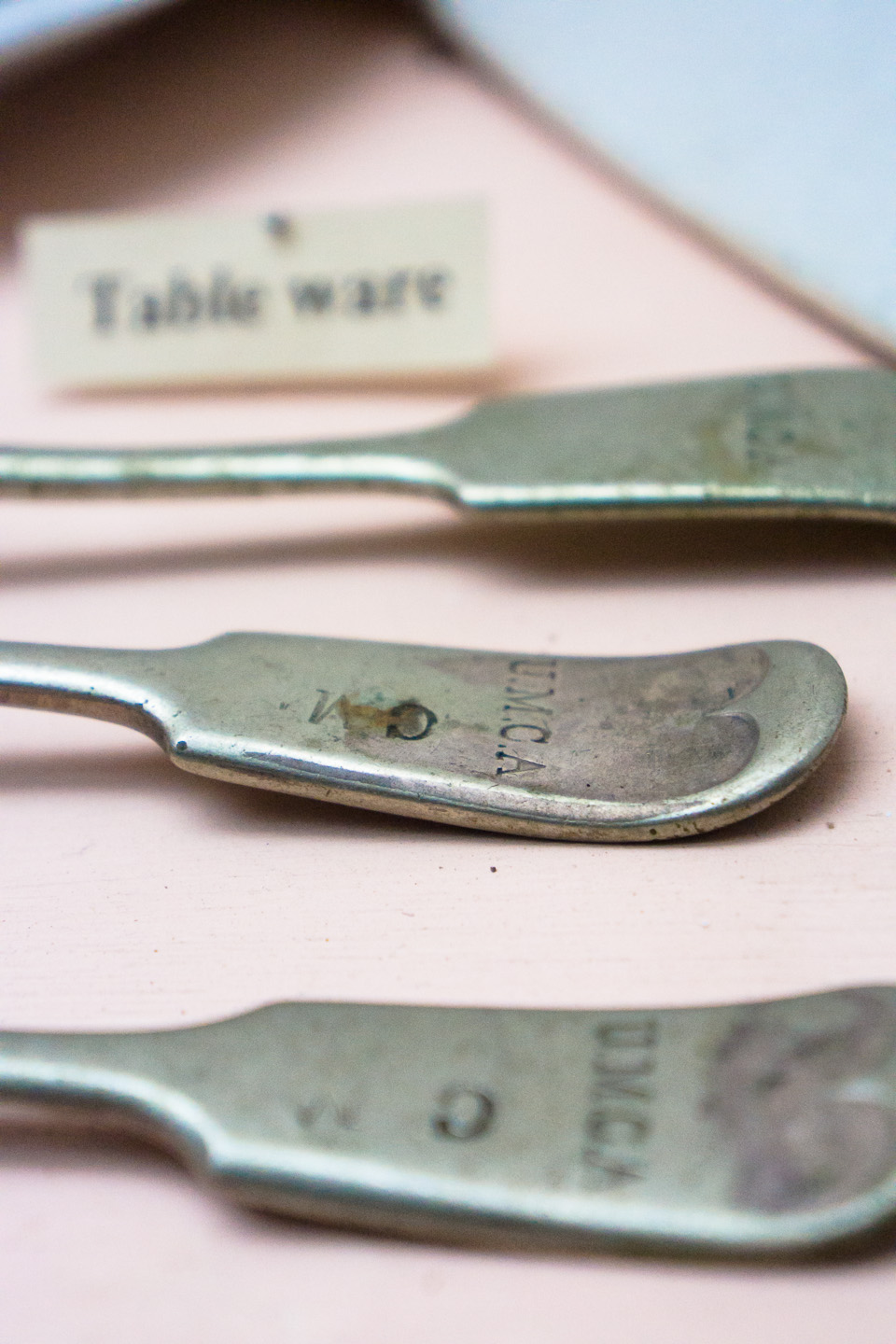
Tableware from UMCA

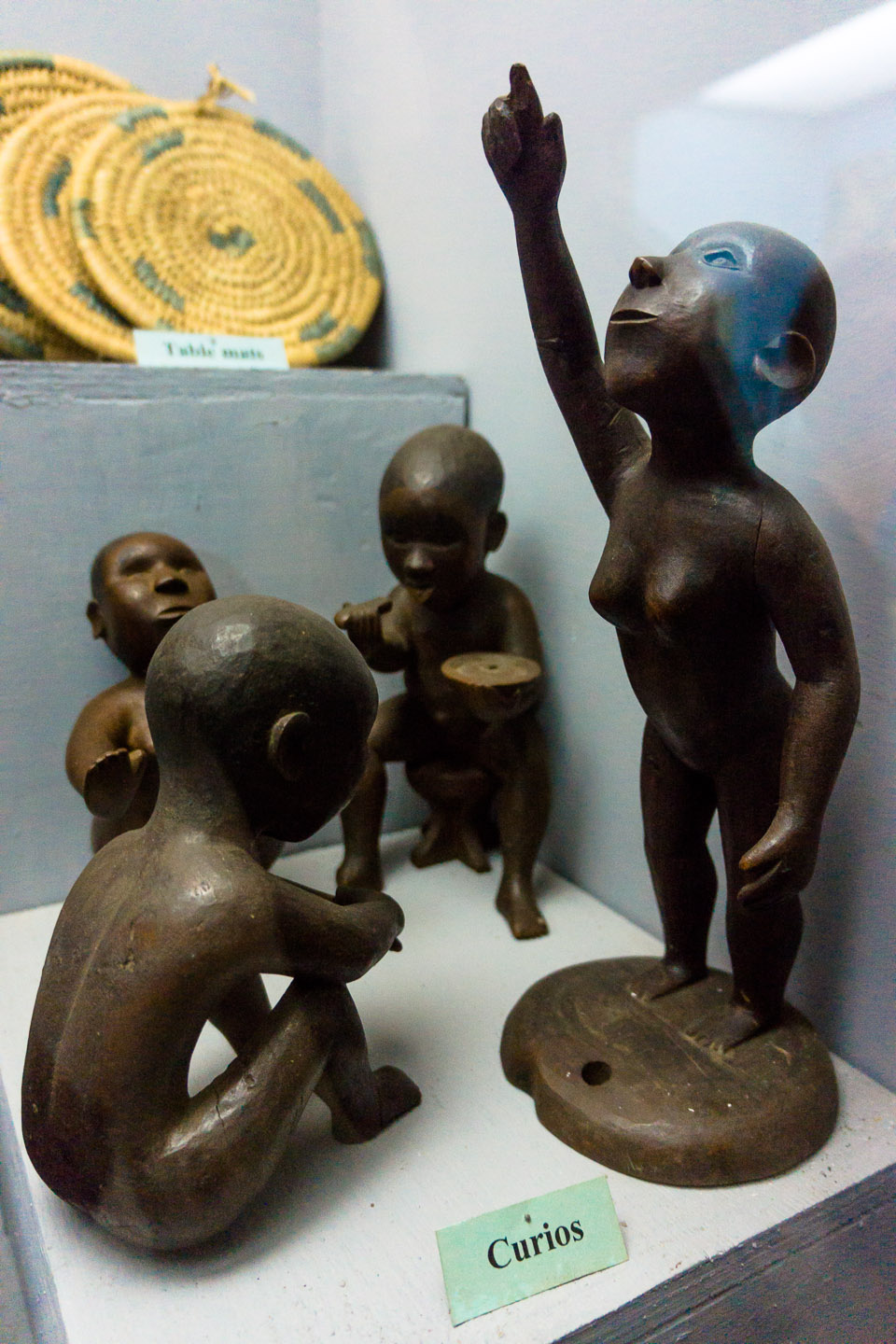
Curios carves from soapstone

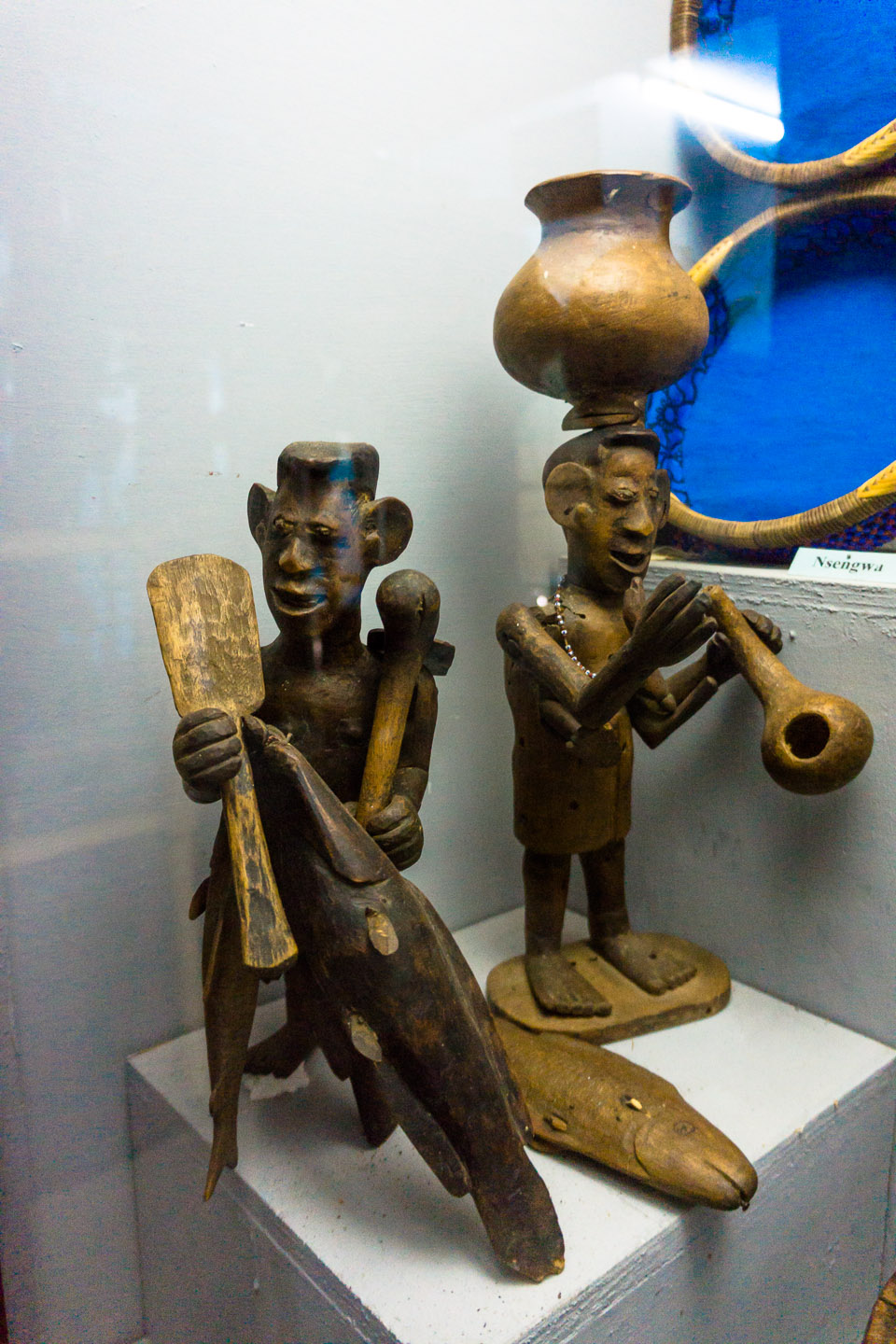
Curios carves from soapstone (2)

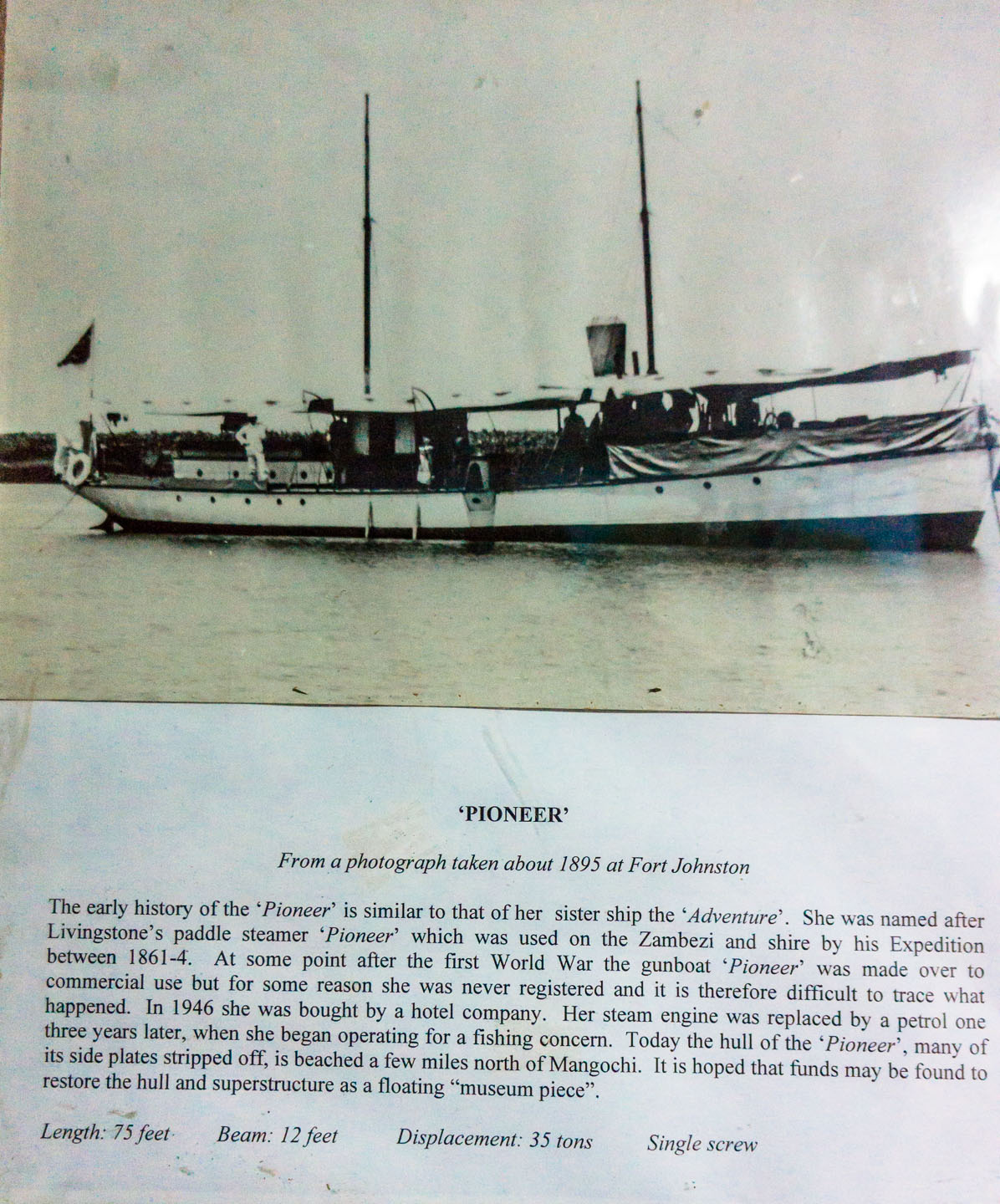
Pioneer boat

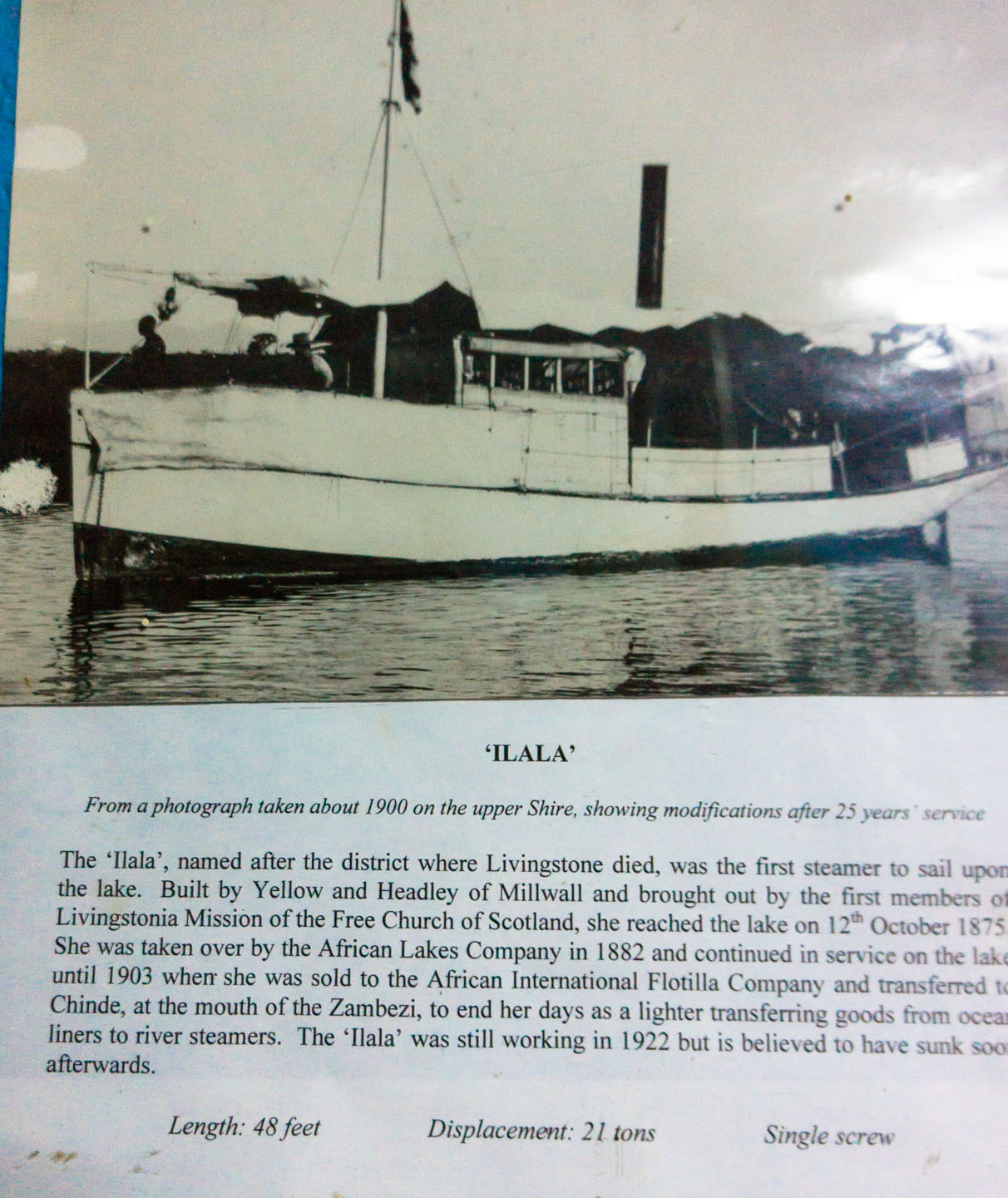
Ilala boat around 1900

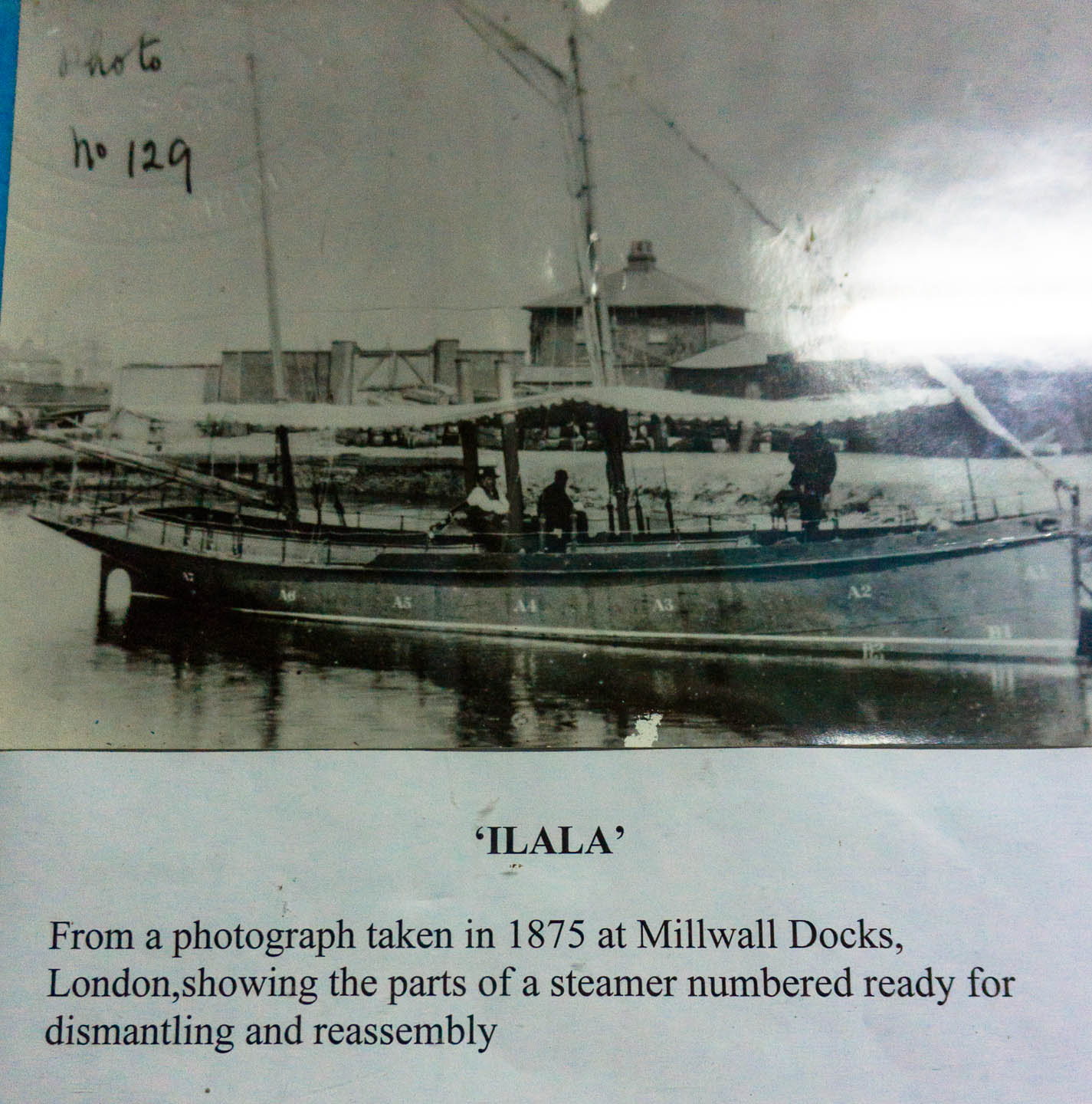
Ilala boat around 1875

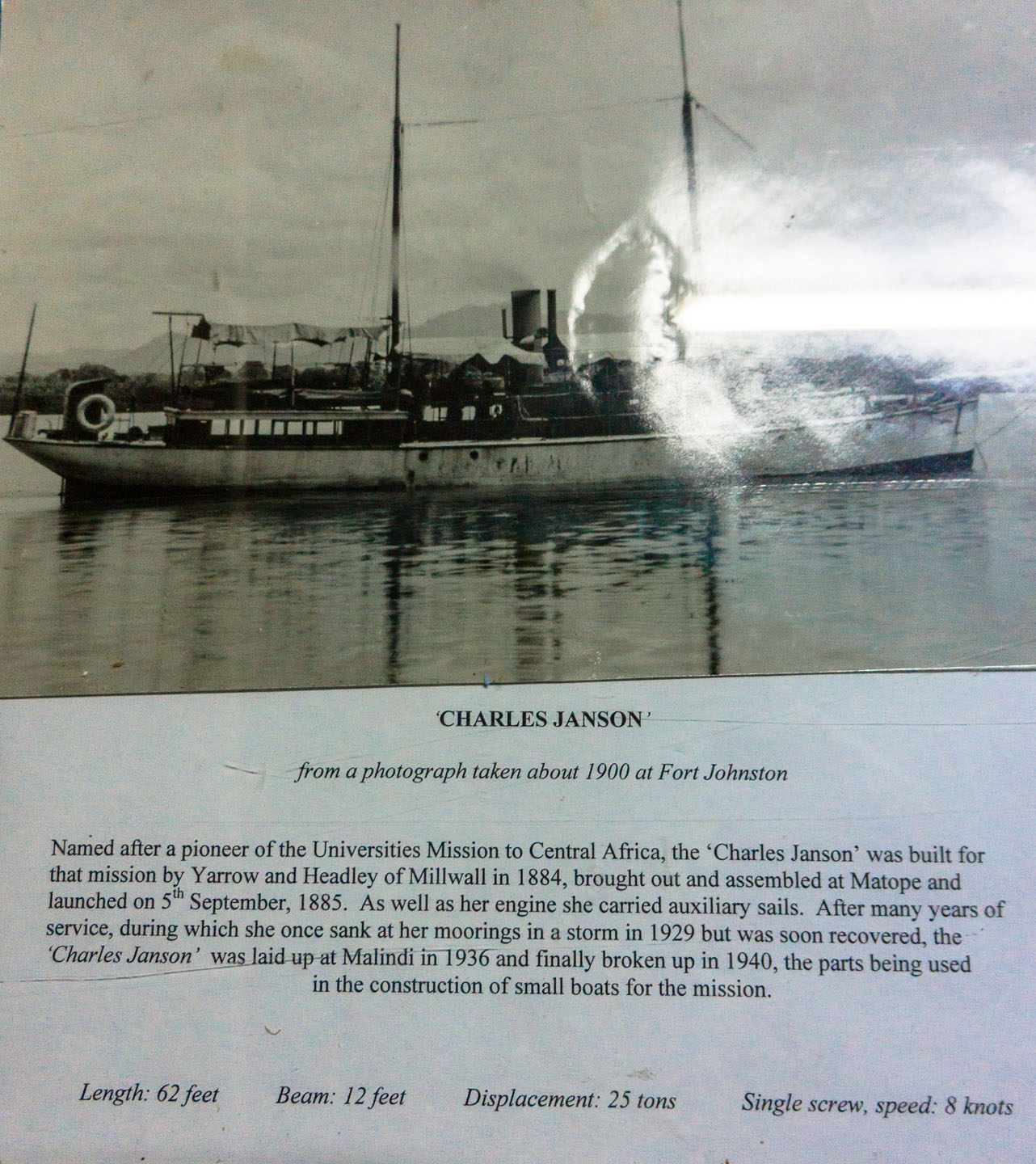
Charles Janson boat around 1900

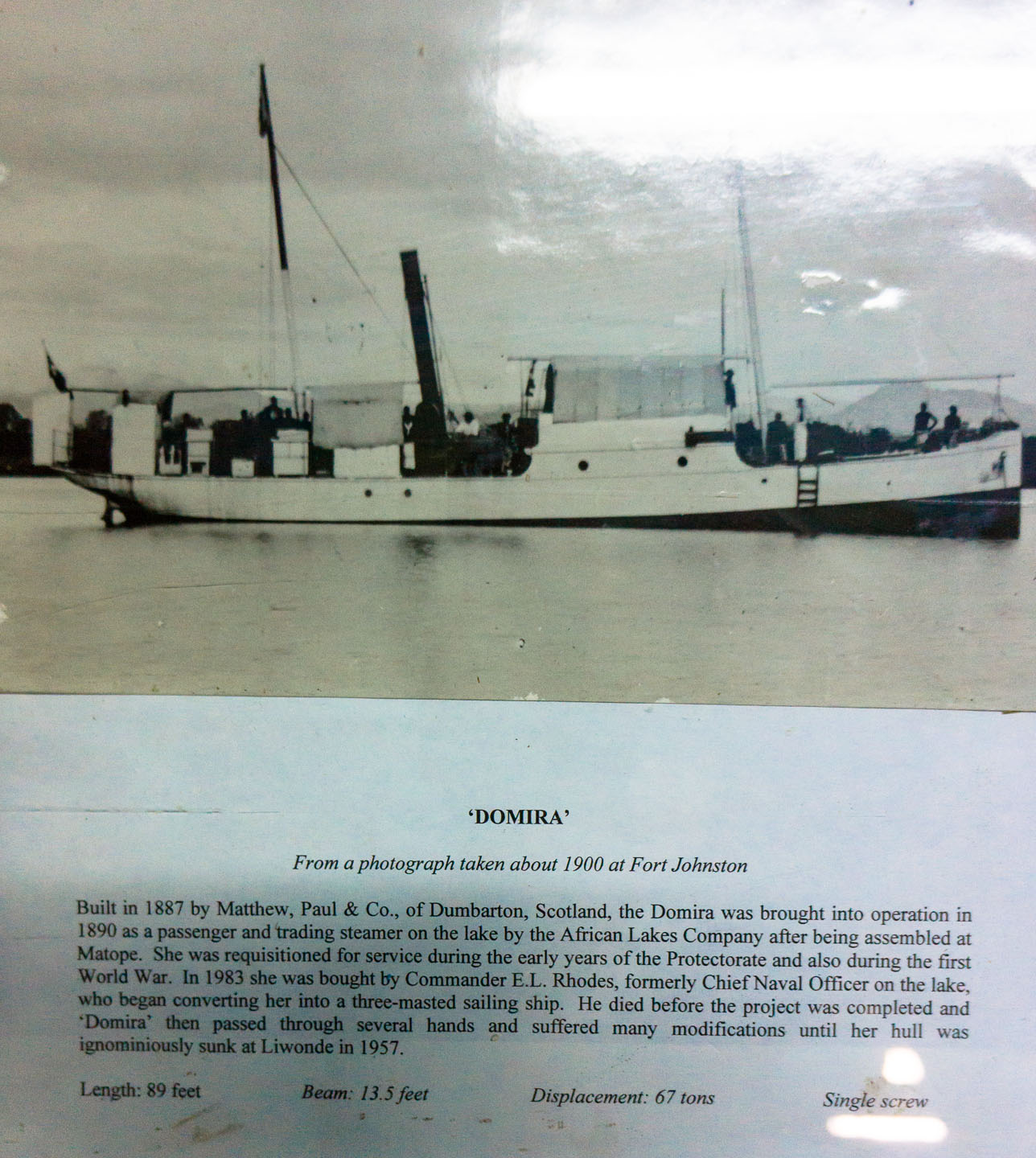
Domira boat around 1900

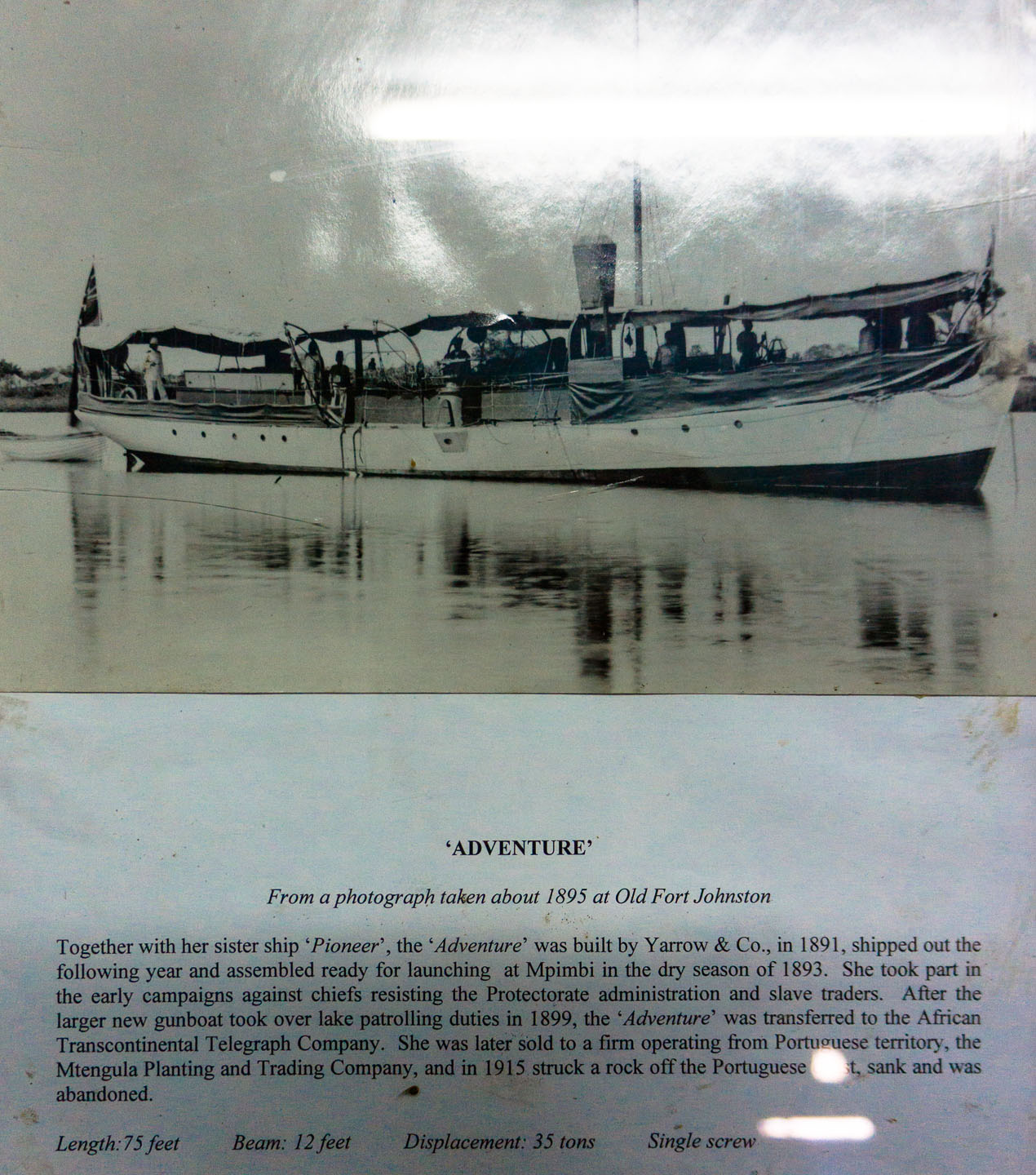
Adventure boat around 1895

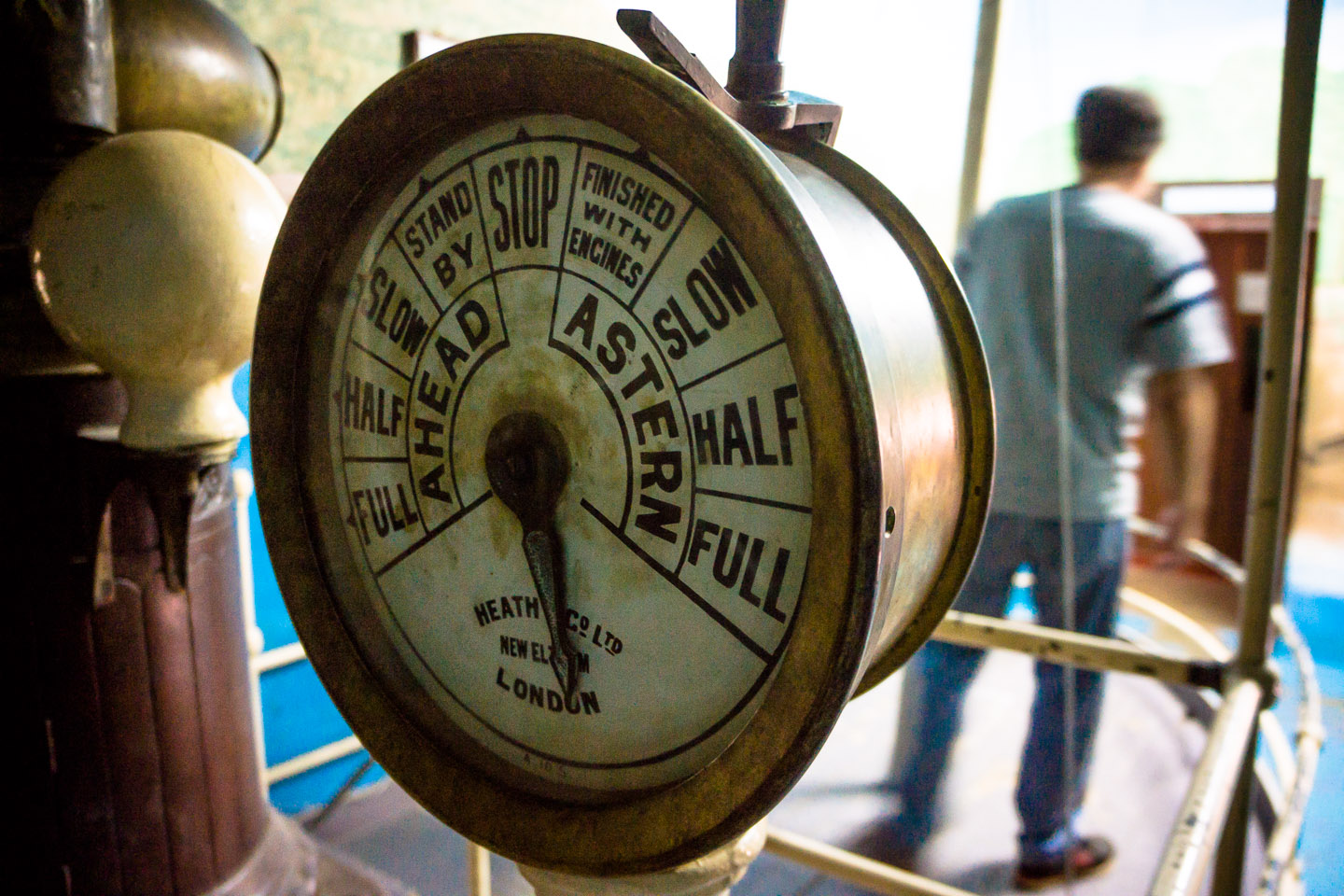
Boat exhibit

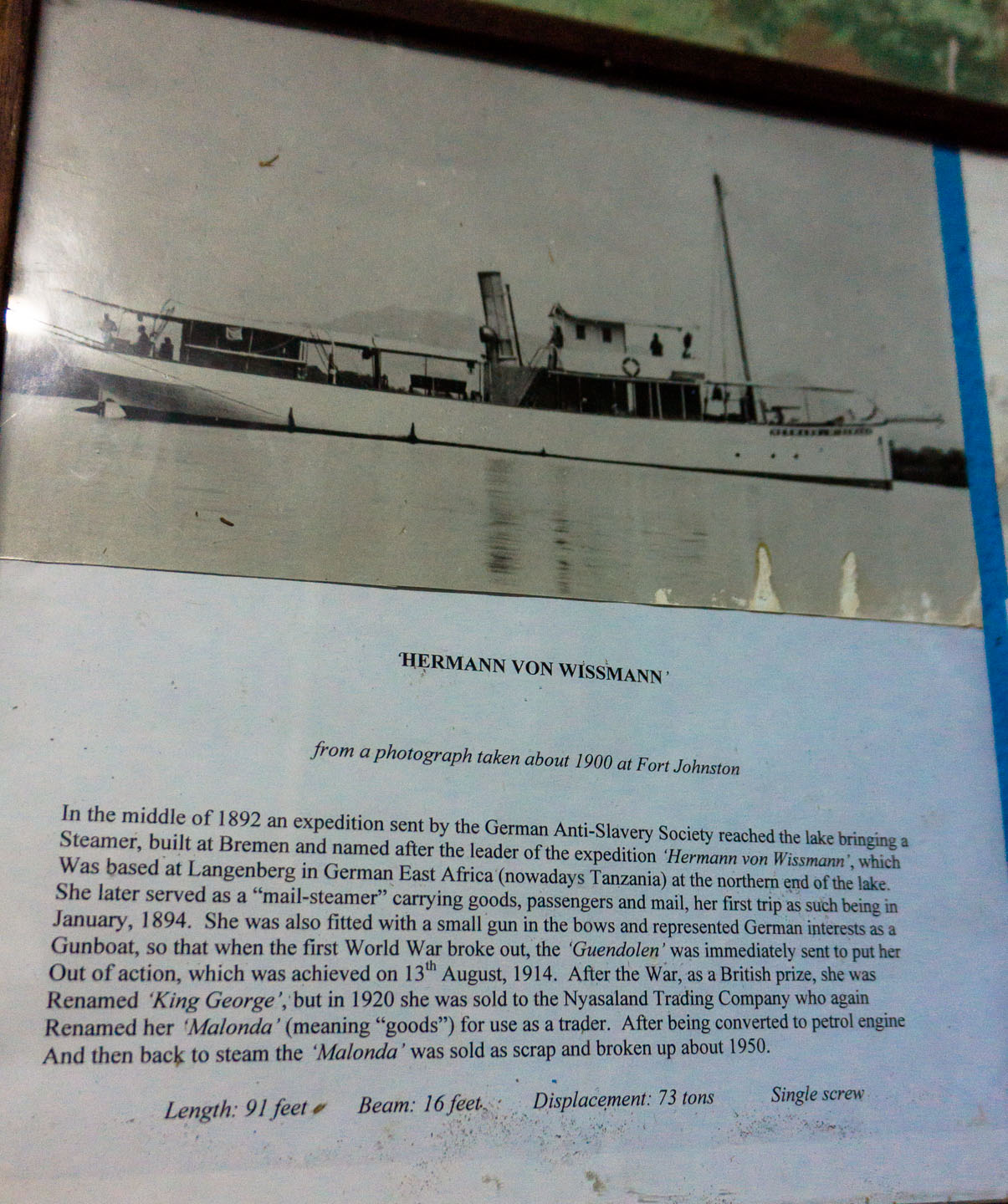
Hermann Von Wissmann boat around 1900

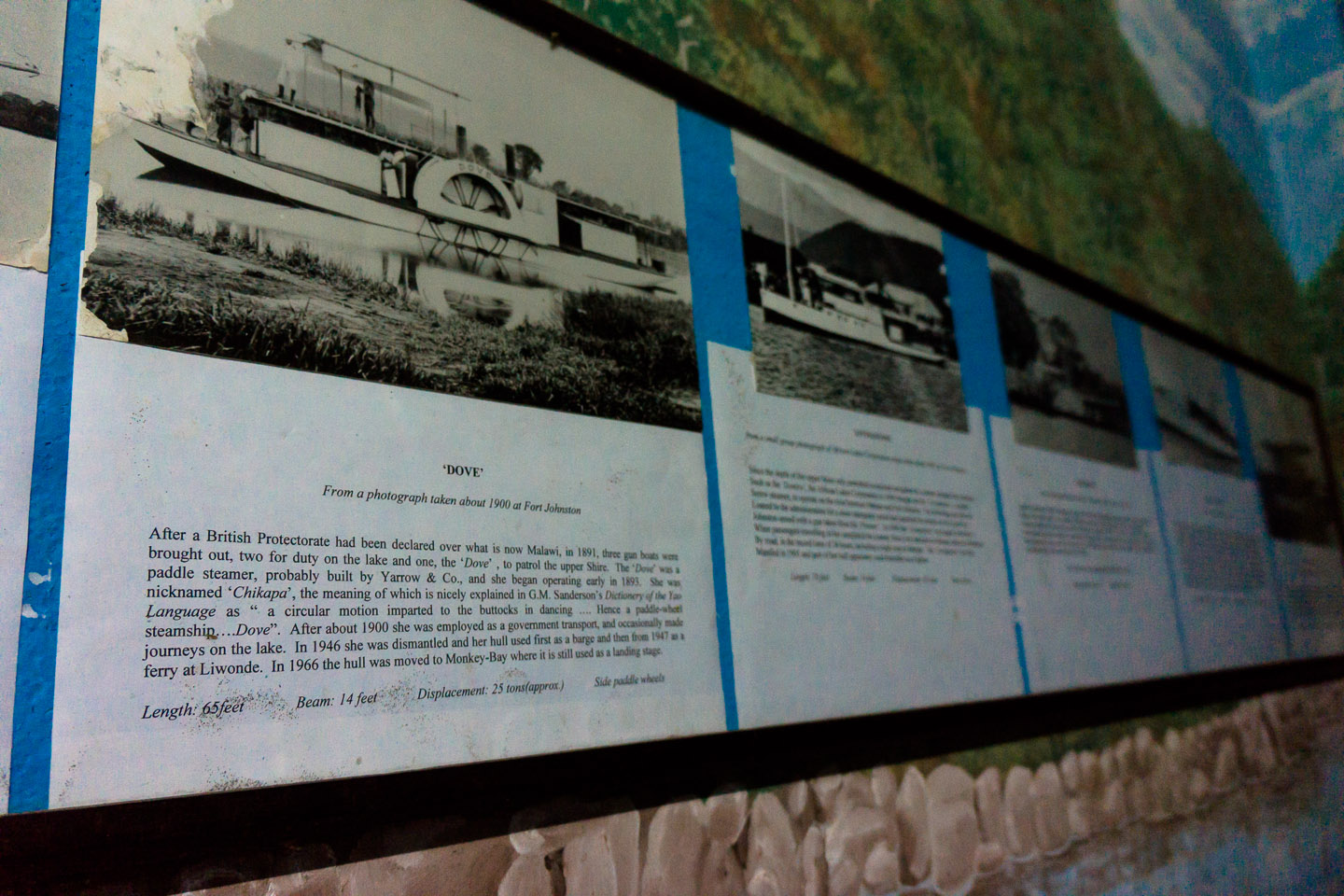
Dove and other boats from around 1900

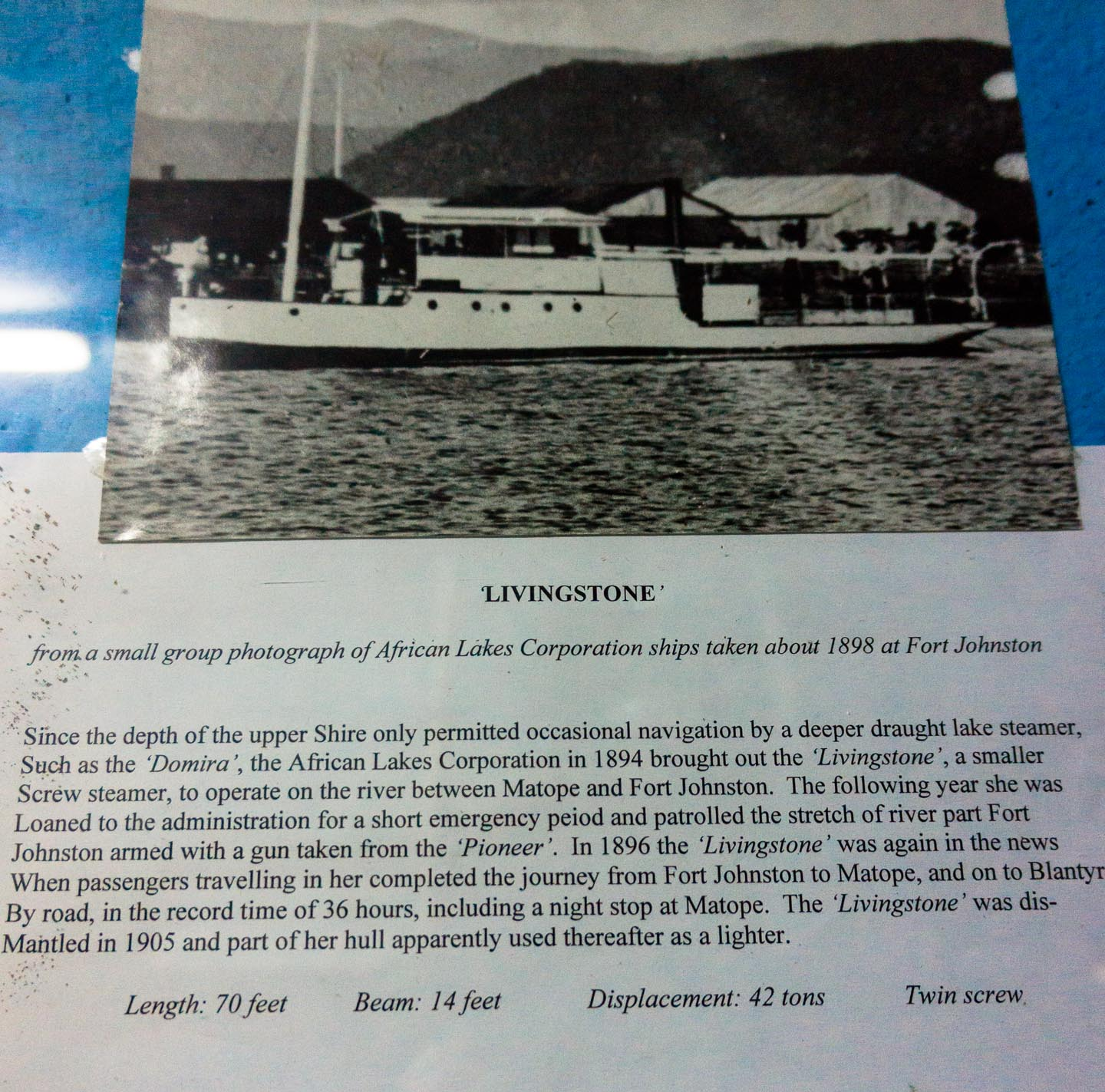
Livingstone boat from around 1898

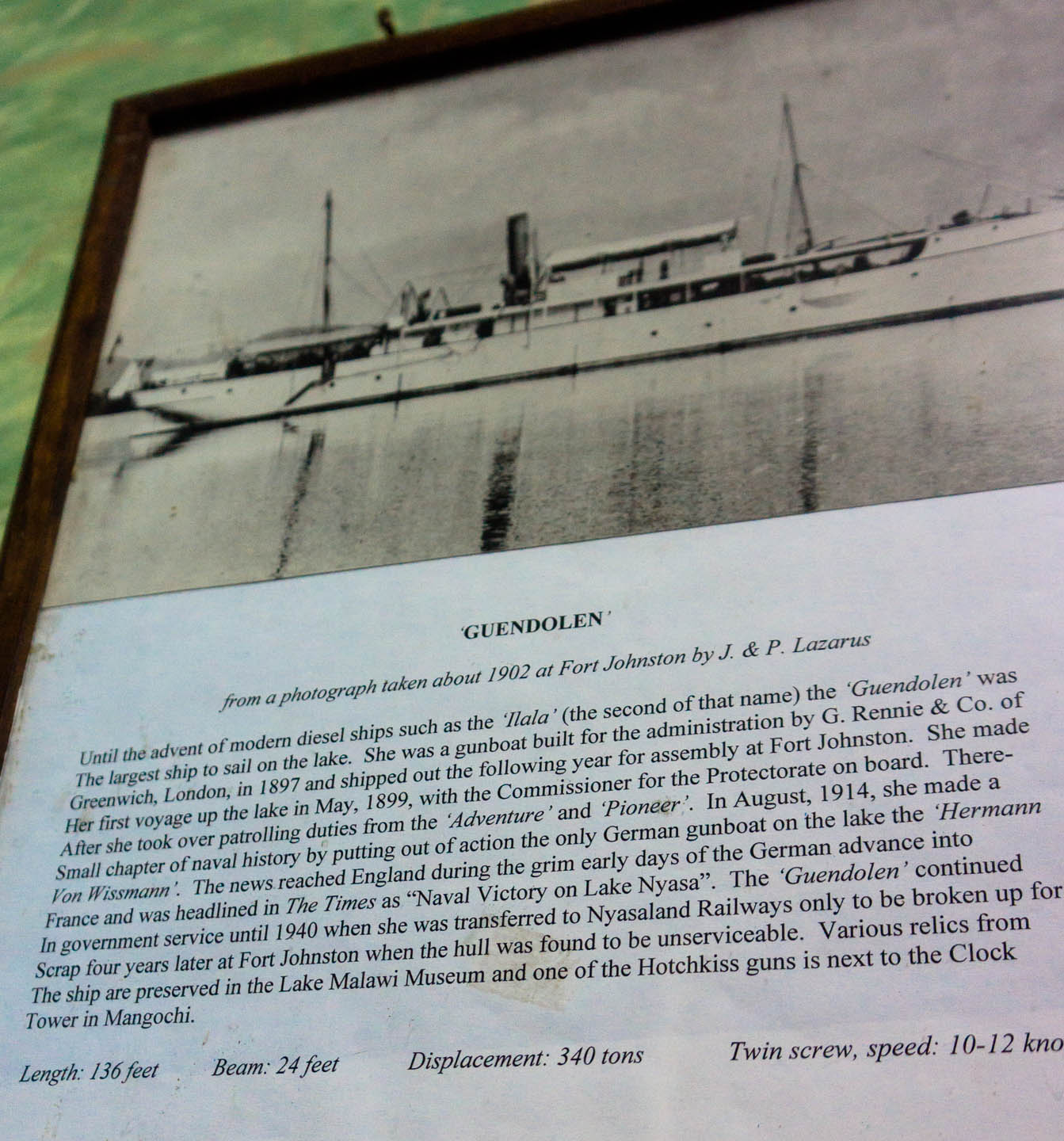
Guendolen boat from around 1902

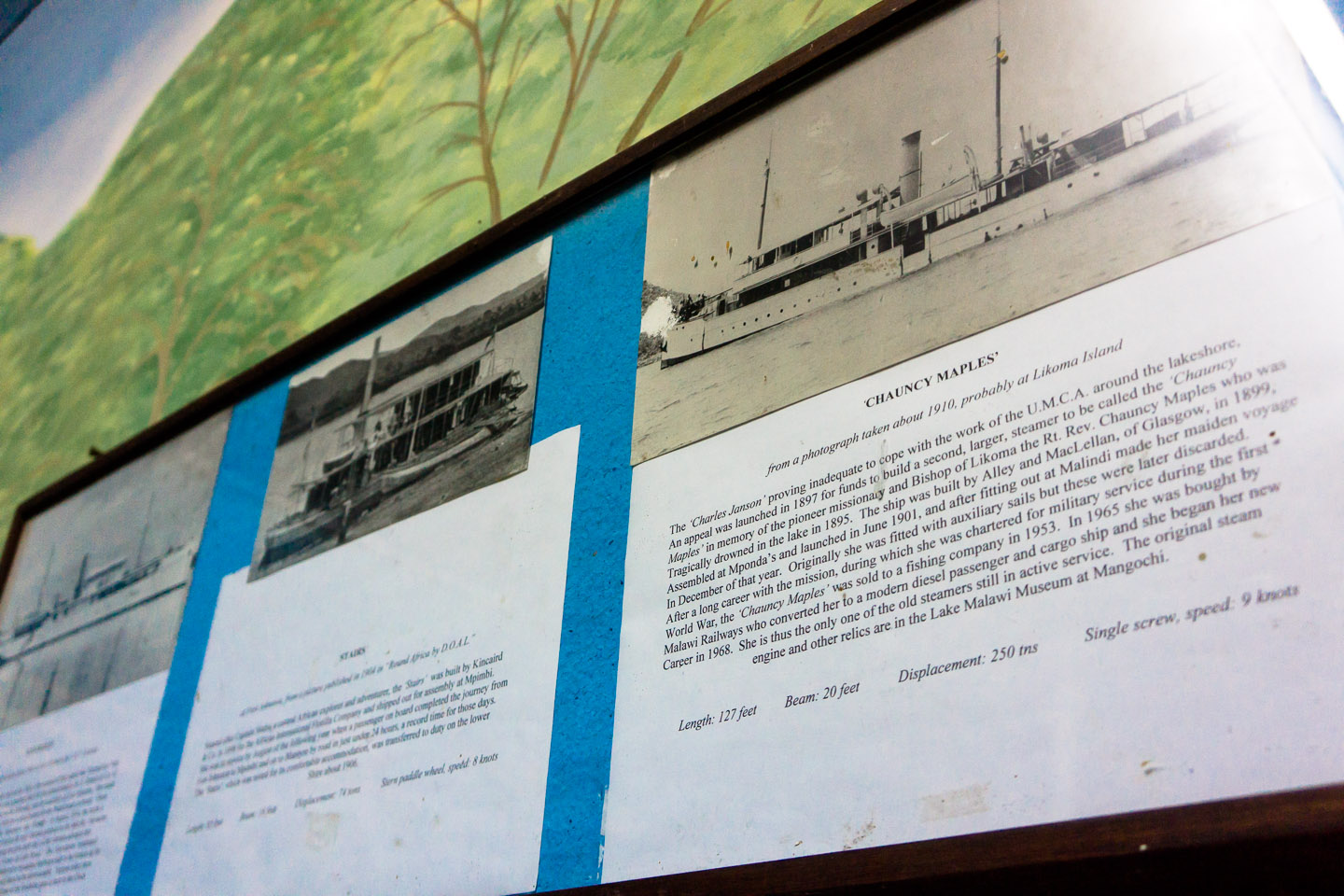
Chauncy Maples and other boats from around 1910

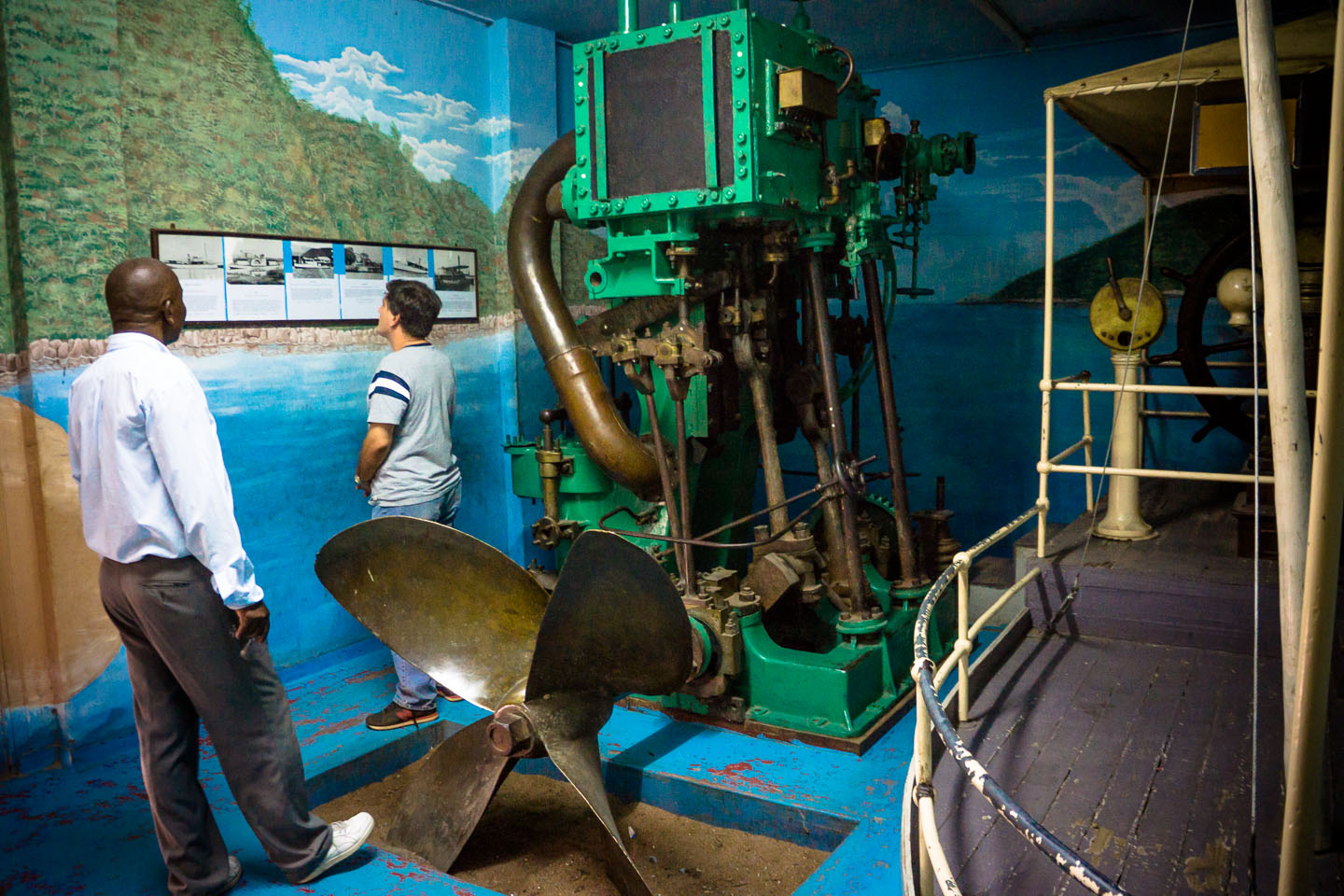
Historical Boats of Lake Malawi
