= List of cities and towns in the Northern Cape =

This is a list of cities and towns in the Northern Cape Province of South Africa.

== Diamond Fields ==
- Barkly West
- Campbell
- Delportshoop
- Douglas
- Griquatown
- Hartswater
- Jan Kempdorp
- Kimberley
- Modder River
- Ulco
- Warrenton
- Windsorton

== Green Kalahari ==
- Andriesvale
- Askham
- Augrabies
- Danielskuil
- Groblershoop
- Kakamas
- Kanoneiland
- Kathu
- Keimoes
- Kenhardt
- Kuruman
- Lime Acres
- Louisvale
- Mier
- Olifantshoek
- Onseepkans
- Postmasburg
- Putsonderwater
- Riemvasmaak
- Rietfontein
- Upington

== Namaqualand ==
- Aggeneys
- Alexander Bay
- Carolusberg
- Concordia
- Garies
- Hondeklip
- Kamieskroon
- Kleinzee
- Nababeep
- Nieuwoudtville
- Okiep
- Pella
- Pofadder
- Port Nolloth
- Soebatsfontein
- Springbok
- Steinkopf

== Upper Karoo ==
- Britstown
- Colesberg
- Copperton
- De Aar
- Hanover
- Hopetown
- Hutchinson
- Loxton
- Marydale
- Norvalspont
- Noupoort
- Orania
- Petrusville
- Philipstown
- Prieska
- Richmond
- Strydenburg
- Vanderkloof
- Victoria West
- Vosburg
