= R359 (South Africa) =

Regional route in South Africa

Regional route R359
- R359 route map

Route information
- Length: 122 km (76 mi)

Major junctions
- West end: Augrabies Falls NP
- N14 at Kakamas; R27 near Keimoes
- East end: N10 near Upington

Location
- Country: South Africa
- Towns: Augrabies, Marchand, Kakamas, Keimoes, Louisvale

Highway system
- Numbered routes of South Africa
| ← R358 | → R360 |

The R359 is a regional route in the Northern Cape province of South Africa that runs along the south bank of the Orange River from Augrabies Falls through Augrabies and Kakamas to Louisvale (south of Upington). It is an alternative route to the N14, which runs on the north bank of the Orange River, between Kakamas and Upington.

== Route ==
The western end of the route is at the entrance to the Augrabies Falls National Park. It passes through the towns of Augrabies and Marchand to meet the N14 national route 9 kilometres (5.6 mi) west of Kakamas. The R359 joins the N14 route eastwards to Kakamas, where the N14 turns to the north-east and crosses the Orange River to run along the north bank while the R359 continues eastwards on the south bank. It proceeds eastwards to cross the R27 route south of Keimoes before turning to the north-east to pass through Louisvale and reach its eastern end at a junction with the N10 national route across the river from Upington.
