= Augrabies =

Augrabies may refer to:

- Augrabies Falls, a waterfall on the Orange River in South Africa
- Augrabies, Northern Cape, a small town near the falls
- Augrabies Falls National Park, a national park surrounding the falls
- Kalahari Augrabies Extreme Marathon, a South African ultramarathon
- Augrabies flat lizard (Platysaurus broadleyi), also known as Broadley's Flat Lizard
- Augrabies (beetle), a genus of beetle with a single species, Augrabies schotiaphaga
