= Lake Malawi (disambiguation) =

Lake Malawi, also known as Lake Nyasa in Tanzania and Lago Niassa in Mozambique, is an African Great Lake and the southernmost lake in the East African Rift system, located between Malawi, Mozambique and Tanzania.

It may also refer to:

- Lake Malawi (band), Czech band
- Lake Malawi EP by band above
- Lake Malawi National Park, national park at the southern end of Lake Malawi in Malawi, Southeast Africa
- Lake Malawi sardine or lake sardine (Engraulicypris sardella), an African species of freshwater fish in the family Cyprinidae endemic to Lake Malawi and its outlet, the (upper) Shire River; it is found in Malawi, Mozambique, and Tanzania
- Lake Malawi Museum, a Malawi museum on Lake Malawi
- Lake Malawi (Lake Nyasa) territorial dispute, the ongoing boundary and sovereignty dispute between Malawi and Tanzania over the delimitation of Lake Malawi / Lake Nyasa
