= Battle of Kakamas =

Battle of the South West Africa campaign of World War I

- Part of South West Africa Campaign
Date	4 February 1915
Location	Kakamas, South Africa 28°45′30″S 20°37′20″E
Result	South African victory

Belligerents
Germany: German Southwest Africa	South Africa

Commanders and leaders
Maj. Hermann Ritter	(Union of South Africa) Col. J. van Deventer

Strength
Unknown	6,000

Casualties and losses
7 killed 16 wounded 16 captured	2 killed
- Location within Northern Cape Battle of Kakamas (South Africa) Battle of Kakamas (Africa)

The battle of Kakamas took place in Kakamas, Northern Cape Province of South Africa on 4 February 1915. It was a skirmish for control of two river fords over the Orange River between contingents of a German invasion force and South African armed forces. The South Africans succeed in preventing the Germans gaining control of the fords and crossing the river.

== Prelude ==
South Africa had assembled a force of 6,000 men in Upington and Kakamas, under the command of Colonel J. van Deventer. Van Deventer's men were to form one of the columns in a planned invasion of German South West Africa. In a pre-emptive move German Schutztruppe under the command of Major Ritter invaded South Africa. The German force comprised 205 mounted riflemen, four artillery guns and four machine guns. Major Ritter's force attacked Kakamas on 4 February 1915 under cover of the German artillery. The Germans managed to capture a small South African outpost at the ferry landing on the riverbank. The South African soldiers had managed to position themselves between the two flanks and Major Ritter, realizing that a South African counter-attack was imminent, ordered his men to withdraw. The South African soldiers were ferried across the river and on the northern bank, the South African soldiers opened fire on the Germans. The German artillery fired at the South African soldiers, but the guns were withdrawn after the German rearguard was captured. The Germans only managed to break away from the South Africans at 23:00 and reached Biesiespoort on 5 February 1915 after which the retreated back across the border into German South West Africa. There were two more German attacks on the northern police border post of Rietfontein but these attacks were repulsed with heavy losses.

== Battle ==
Ritter attacked Kakamas on 4 February 1915, hoping to capture two Orange River fords and head south further into South Africa. A fierce skirmish developed with the Germans being beaten back, with the loss of seven dead, sixteen wounded and sixteen taken prisoner.

== Aftermath ==
Following the battle van Deventer called up the rest of his column from Upington, 80 kilometres away, crossed the Orange River and proceeded to advance slowly into South West Africa.

== Memorial ==
Just outside the town, in the town's cemetery, there is a memorial dedicated to the German soldiers killed in the battle.

== See also ==
- Maritz Rebellion or the Boer Revolt occurred in South Africa in 1914 at the start of World War I.
