= Augrabies, South Africa =

Augrabies
- Location within Northern Cape Location within South Africa
- Coordinates: 28°39′36″S 20°25′50″E
- Country: South Africa
- Province: Northern Cape
- District: ZF Mgcawu
- Municipality: Kai !Garib

Area
  - Total: 3.82 km^{2} (1.47 sq mi)

Population (2011)
  - Total: 3,627
  - Density: 949/km^{2} (2,460/sq mi)

Racial makeup (2011)
  - Black African: 36.8%
  - Coloured: 47.1%
  - Indian/Asian: 2.8%
  - White: 9.4%
  - Other: 3.9%

First languages (2011)
  - Afrikaans: 66.7%
  - Tswana: 28.8%
  - English: 1.6%
  - Other: 2.8%
- Time zone: UTC+2 (SAST)
- PO box: 8874
- Area code: 054

Augrabies /ɔːˈxrɑːbiːz/ is a small town in the Northern Cape province of South Africa, situated on the south bank of the Orange River about 100 kilometres (60 mi) downstream from Upington. It is located on the R359 road just outside the Augrabies Falls National Park, which contains the Augrabies Falls for which the town is named.
