= Kai ǃGarib Local Municipality =

Kai ǃGarib
- Local municipality
- Seal

- Location in the Northern Cape
- Coordinates: 29°0′S 20°30′E
- Country: South Africa
- Province: Northern Cape
- District: ZF Mgcawu
- Seat: Kakamas
- Wards: 10

Government
  - Type: Municipal council
  - Mayor: Marshall Mathys
  - Speaker: Ethel Nomacule Vas

Area
  - Total: 26,358 km^{2} (10,177 sq mi)

Population (2022)
  - Total: 85,104
  - Density: 3.2288/km^{2} (8.3625/sq mi)

Racial makeup (2022)
  - Black African: 18.7%
  - Coloured: 72.2%
  - Indian/Asian: 1.2%
  - White: 7.2%

First languages (2011)
  - Afrikaans: 71.9%
  - Tswana: 24.2%
  - English: 1.2%
  - Other: 2.7%
- Time zone: UTC+2 (SAST)
- Municipal code: NC082

Kai ǃGarib Municipality (Afrikaans: Kai !Garib Munisipaliteit; Tswana: Mmasepala wa Kai !Garib) is a local municipality within the ZF Mgcawu District Municipality, in the Northern Cape province of South Africa. The name Kai ǃGarib originates from the Khoekhoe language and means "big great river", referring to the Orange River that flows through the area.

Augrabies Falls National Park is located within the municipality.

== Main places ==
The 2001 census divided the municipality into the following main places:

Place	Code	Area (km^{2})	Population
Alheit	31601	7.88	683
Augrabies Mission	31603	0.32	287
Augrabies	31602	4.42	2,694
Bloemsmond	31604	1.02	315
Cillie	31605	6.57	2,454
Kakamas	31607	4.96	7,303
Kanoneiland	31608	0.26	247
Keimoes	31609	26.34	9,397
Kenhardt	31610	4.24	3,796
Lennetsville	31611	0.16	1,499
Louisvale	31612	8.61	1,088
Loxtonberg	31613	1.58	708
Lutzburg	31614	0.25	1,302
Marchand	31615	4.86	2,391
Raaswater	31616	0.32	1,980
Riemvasmaak	31617	1.60	696
Remainder of the municipality	31606	7,376.80	20,830

== Demographics ==
According to the 2022 South African census, the municipality had a population of 85,104 people. Of those, 72.2% identified as "Coloured," 18.7 as "Black African," and 7.2% as "White."

== Politics ==
The municipal council consists of nineteen members elected by mixed-member proportional representation. Ten councillors are elected by first-past-the-post voting in ten wards, while the remaining nine are chosen from party lists so that the total number of party representatives is proportional to the number of votes received. In the election of 1 November 2021 the African National Congress (ANC) won a majority of ten seats on the council. The following table shows the results of the election.

Kai !Garib local election, 1 November 2021
Party	Votes				Seats		
Party	Ward	List	Total	%	Ward	List	Total
African National Congress	8,229	8,220	16,449	44.4%	10	0	10
Hope for the Future	3,992	3,976	7,968	21.5%	0	4	4
Democratic Alliance	3,314	3,372	6,686	18.0%	0	3	3
Economic Freedom Fighters	863	985	1,848	5.0%	0	1	1
Freedom Front Plus	595	528	1,123	3.0%	0	1	1
Patriotic Alliance	435	517	952	2.6%	0	0	0
Khoisan Revolution	454	492	946	2.6%	0	0	0
Independent candidates	414	–	414	1.1%	0	–	0
Good	159	150	309	0.8%	0	0	0
Congress of the People	20	127	147	0.4%	0	0	0
Independent South African National Civic Organisation	70	76	146	0.4%	0	0	0
Africa Restoration Alliance	44	48	92	0.2%	0	0	0
Total	18,589	18,491	37,080		10	9	19
Valid votes	18,589	18,491	37,080	97.7%			
Spoilt votes	310	573	883	2.3%			
Total votes cast	18,899	19,064	37,963				
Voter turnout	19,188						
Registered voters	30,846						
Turnout percentage	62.2%						

== Financial mismanagement ==
In January 2025, the municipality was listed as one of the top ten municipalities in arrears on their pension contributions.
