= R359 road =

R359 road may refer to:

- R359 road (Ireland)
- R359 road (South Africa)
