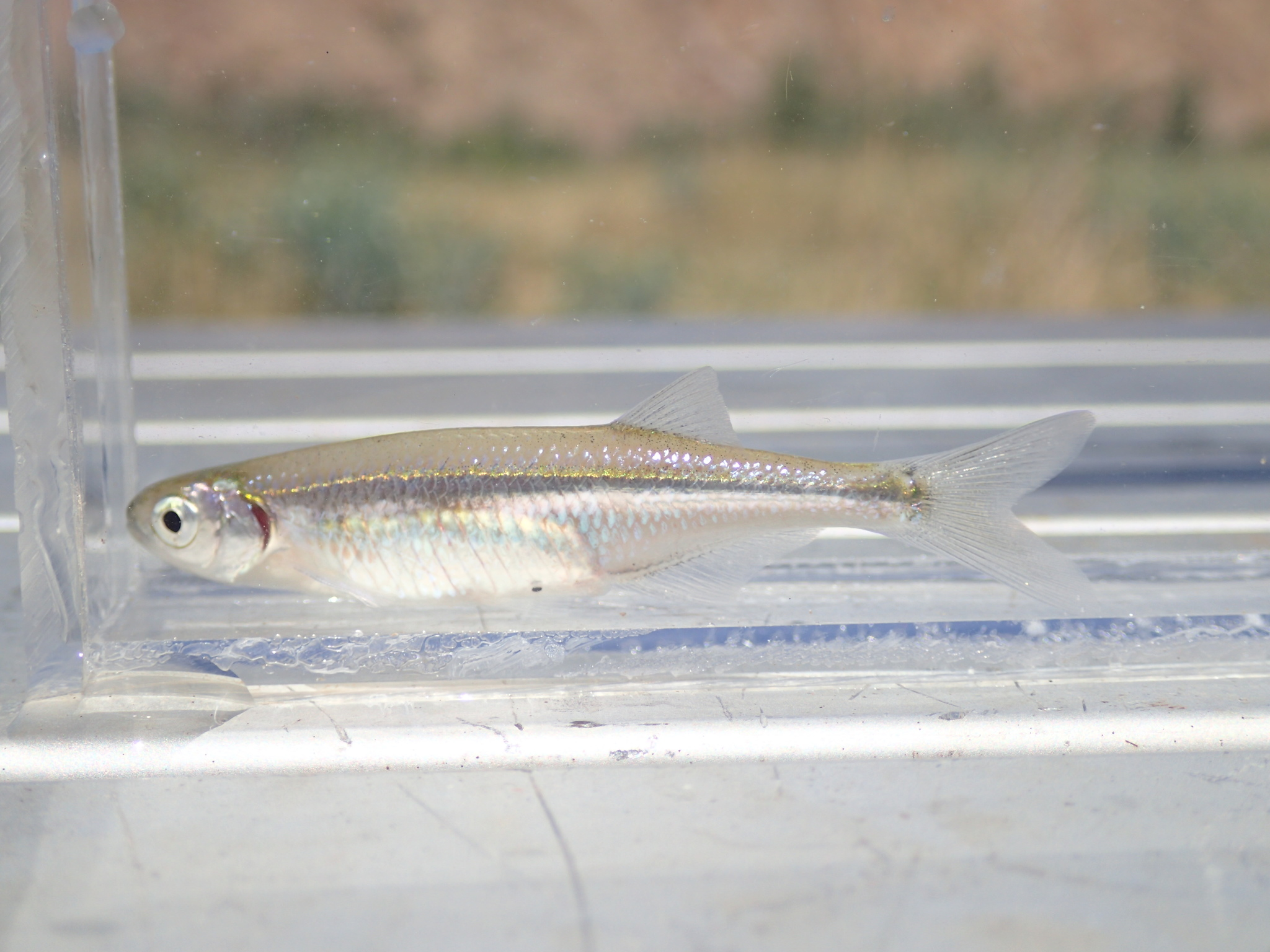

Conservation status
- Least Concern (IUCN 3.1)

Scientific classification
- Kingdom: Animalia
- Phylum: Chordata
- Class: Actinopterygii
- Order: Cypriniformes
- Family: Danionidae
- Genus: Engraulicypris
- Species: E. gariepinus

Binomial name
- Engraulicypris gariepinus Barnard, 1943

Synonyms
- Mesobola gariepinus (Barnard, 1943)

= Engraulicypris gariepinus =

White Mbala

Species of fish

Engraulicypris gariepinus, commonly known as the White Mbala, is an African species of freshwater ray-finned fish belonging to the family Danionidae. It is found in the Orange River below the Augrabies Falls. It is sometimes considered conspecific with the river sardine.
