= Zelotes albanicus =

Grahamstown Dark Ground Spider

Conservation status
- Least Concern (SANBI Red List)

Scientific classification
- Kingdom: Animalia
- Phylum: Arthropoda
- Subphylum: Chelicerata
- Class: Arachnida
- Order: Araneae
- Infraorder: Araneomorphae
- Family: Gnaphosidae
- Genus: Zelotes
- Species: Z. albanicus

Binomial name
- Zelotes albanicus (Hewitt, 1915)

Synonyms
- Melanophora albanicus Hewitt, 1915

Species of spider

Zelotes albanicus is a species of spider in the family Gnaphosidae. It is commonly known as the Grahamstown dark ground spider.

== Distribution ==
Zelotes albanicus is endemic to South Africa. It has been recorded from four provinces: Eastern Cape, Free State, Northern Cape, and Western Cape, at altitudes ranging from 6 to 2,020 m above sea level.

Notable locations include Grahamstown in the Eastern Cape (the type locality), Addo Elephant National Park, Augrabies National Park, De Hoop Nature Reserve, Table Mountain National Park, and Cederberg Wilderness Area.

== Habitat and ecology ==
The species inhabits Savanna, Grassland, and Fynbos biomes. These are free-running ground spiders that are typically collected using pitfall traps.

== Conservation ==
Zelotes albanicus is listed as Least Concern by the South African National Biodiversity Institute due to its wide geographic range. There are no significant threats to the species. It is protected in multiple reserves including Addo Elephant National Park, Augrabies National Park, De Hoop Nature Reserve, Table Mountain National Park, and Cederberg Wilderness Area.

== Taxonomy ==
The species was originally described by Hewitt in 1915 from Grahamstown in the Eastern Cape as Melanophora albanicus. It was revised by FitzPatrick in 2007. The species is known only from the female.
