= Marchand, South Africa =

Marchand
- View from R359 across the Orange River valley

- Location within Northern Cape Location within South Africa
- Coordinates: 28.716667°S 20.5°E
- Country: South Africa
- Province: Northern Cape
- District: ZF Mgcawu
- Municipality: Kai !Garib

Area
  - Total: 4.45 km^{2} (1.72 sq mi)

Population (2011)
  - Total: 3,222
  - Density: 724/km^{2} (1,880/sq mi)

Racial makeup (2011)
  - Black African: 15.4%
  - Coloured: 63.2%
  - Indian/Asian: 0.7%
  - White: 7.9%
  - Other: 12.9%

First languages (2011)
  - Afrikaans: 75.5%
  - Tswana: 20.1%
  - Xhosa: 1.7%
  - Other: 2.8%
- Time zone: UTC+2 (SAST)
- Postal code (street): 8873
- PO box: 8873
- Area code: 054

Marchand is a town in ZF Mgcawu District Municipality in the Northern Cape province of South Africa.

The town is located on the R359 road, on the way to the Augrabies Falls.
