= Christian Wilhelm Alheit =

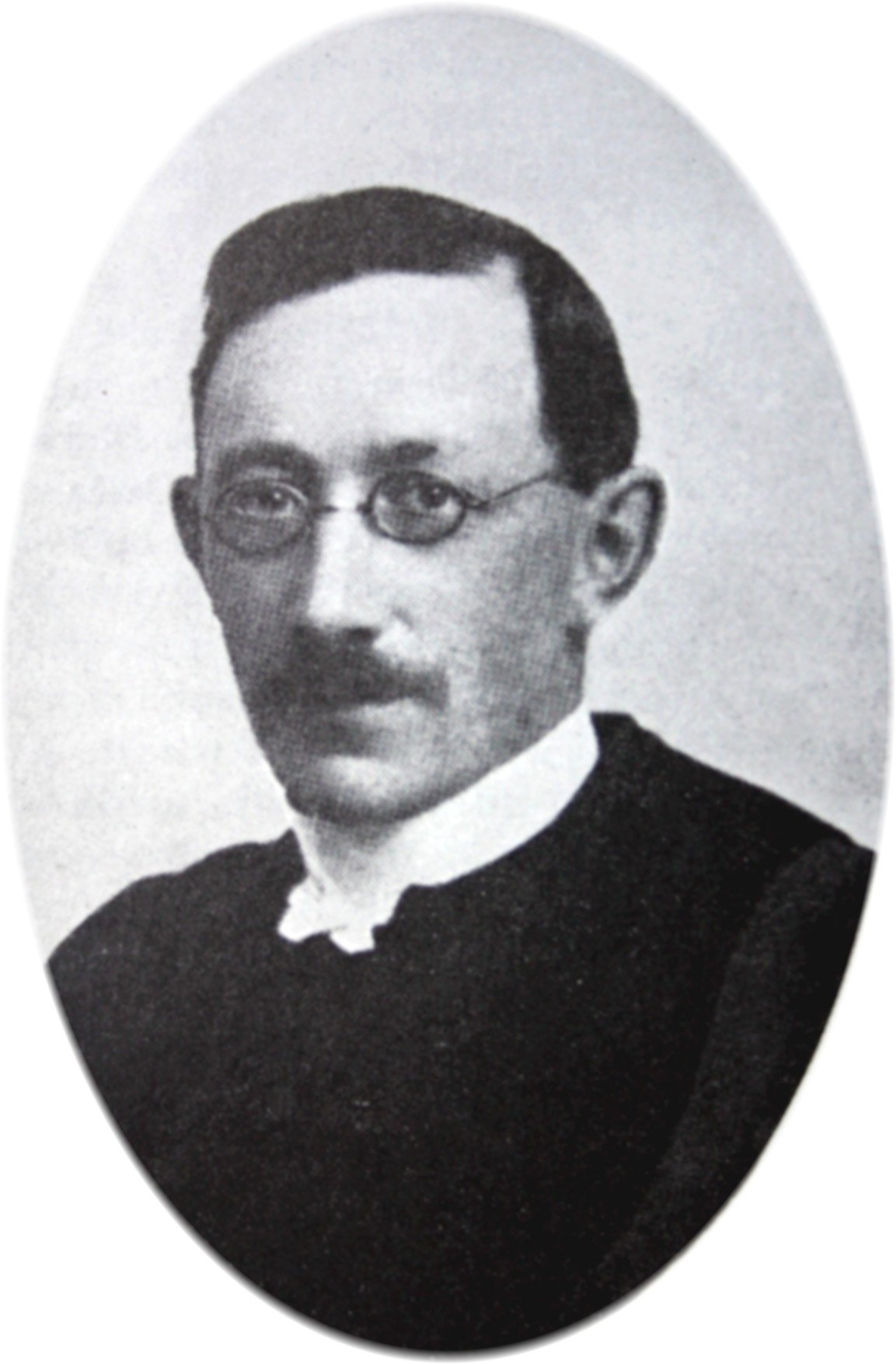
Christian Wilhelm Alheit

Christian Wilhelm Alheit, also known as Christoph Wilhelm Alheit (13 November 1817 in Mühlhausen, Thüringen – 21 March 1882 in Steinthal, Tulbagh district), was a Rhenish missionary.

Alheit arrived in South Africa in 1842 and worked at mission stations in Tulbagh (1842–1847), Schietfontein (1847–1864), Stellenbosch (1864–1873) and Saron (1873–1882).

Between 1864 and 1873 he was head of a boys' hostel in Stellenbosch, where a third of the boys were the sons of Rhenish missionaries. Here Alheit showed great aptitude in the teaching of mathematics. Another hostel opened in 1860 and was called the Rhenish Institute for the daughters of Rhenish missionaries. From these schools a Gymnasium developed, which later turned into Victoria College and finally into Stellenbosch University.

The hamlet of Alheit 28°45′00″S 20°33′00″E, on the Orange River between Kakamas and the Augrabies Falls, is named after him.

== Family ==
On 14 September 1847 in Tulbagh, he married Mathilde Johanna Sanetta Vos (*7 October 1817 Caledon – †12 June 1906 Tulbagh). She was the sister of the missionary Ariel Vos and daughter of the well-known Rev. M. C. Vos. Alheit's only son, Rev. W. A. Alheit of Ceres, drowned at Jongensklip near Kleinmond. Four of the drowned man's sons became ministers of the Nederduits Gereformeerde Kerk and the fifth, a teacher of mathematics. One of C. W. Alheit's daughters married the Rhenish missionary Johann Gerdener. While stationed at Saron, a mission station about 18 km northwest of Tulbagh, C. W. Alheit was killed in a horse and cart accident at the farm Steinthal, about 5 km east of Tulbagh.

"Alheit" is derived from "Adelheid", a German word for "nobility".
