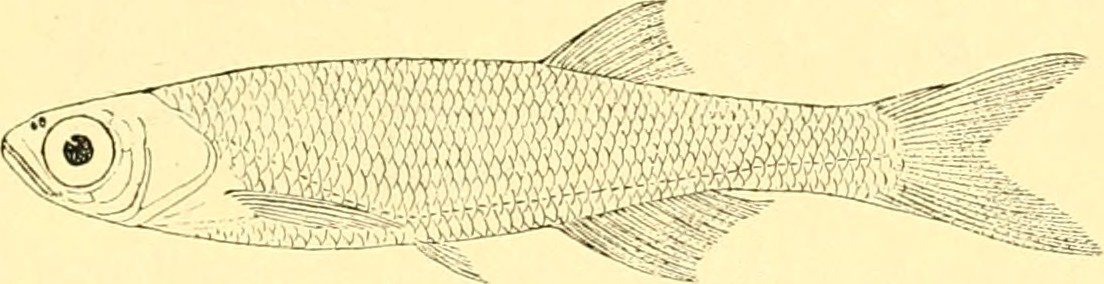
- Engraulicypris brevianalis

Scientific classification
- Kingdom: Animalia
- Phylum: Chordata
- Class: Actinopterygii
- Order: Cypriniformes
- Family: Danionidae
- Subfamily: Chedrinae
- Genus: Engraulicypris; Günther, 1894

Type species
- Engraulicypris pinguis Günther, 1894

Synonyms
- Mesobola Howes, 1984

= Engraulicypris =

Genus of fishes

Engraulicypris is a genus of freshwater ray-finned fish belonging to the family Danionidae, the danionins or danios. This genus is classified in the subfamily Chedrinae and the species in the genus are endemic to Africa. In a study of mitochondrial genealogy, the species formerly included in Mesobola are not phylogenetically separated from Engraulicypris and therefore should also be included in Engraulicypris.

== Species ==
There are currently 7 recognized species in this genus:

- Engraulicypris bredoi Poll, 1945
- Engraulicypris brevianalis (Boulenger, 1908) (river sardine)
- Engraulicypris gariepinus Barnard, 1943
- Engraulicypris howesi Riddin, I. R. Bills & Villet, 2016
- Engraulicypris ngalala Riddin, Villet & I. R. Bills, 2016
- Engraulicypris sardella (Günther, 1868) (Lake Malawi sardine)
- Engraulicypris spinifer R. G. Bailey & Matthes, 1971 (Malagarasi sardine)
