= Engraulicypris ngalala =

Conservation status
- Least Concern (IUCN 3.1)

Scientific classification
- Kingdom: Animalia
- Phylum: Chordata
- Class: Actinopterygii
- Order: Cypriniformes
- Family: Danionidae
- Genus: Engraulicypris
- Species: E. ngalala

Binomial name
- Engraulicypris ngalala Riddin, I. R. Bills & Villet, 2016

Species of fish

Engraulicypris ngalala is a species of freshwater ray-finned fish belonging to the family Danionidae, the danionins or danios. It inhabits the Rovuma River in Mozambique and Lake Chiuta in Malawi. It has a maximum length of 5.1 cm (2.0 inches).
