= Engraulicypris howesi =

Scientific classification
- Kingdom: Animalia
- Phylum: Chordata
- Class: Actinopterygii
- Order: Cypriniformes
- Family: Danionidae
- Genus: Engraulicypris
- Species: E. howesi

Binomial name
- Engraulicypris howesi Riddin, I. R. Bills & Villet, 2016

Species of fish

Engraulicypris howesi is a species of freshwater ray-finned fish belonging to the family Danionidae, the danionins or danios. It inhabits the Kunene River in Angola and Namibia and has a maximum length of 4.3 cm (1.7 inches).

== Etymology ==
The fish is named in honor of Gordon J. Howes (1938–2013), of the Natural History Museum in London, and whose studies of the osteology of the Danioninae laid the foundations for their modern classification.
