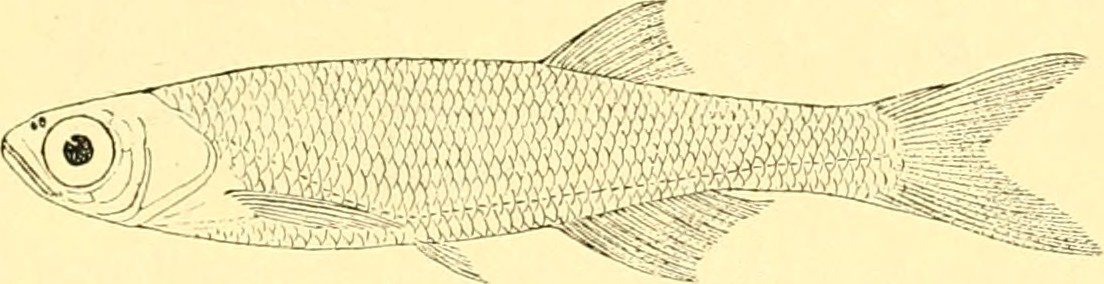

Conservation status
- Least Concern (IUCN 3.1)

Scientific classification
- Kingdom: Animalia
- Phylum: Chordata
- Class: Actinopterygii
- Order: Cypriniformes
- Family: Danionidae
- Genus: Engraulicypris
- Species: E. brevianalis

Binomial name
- Engraulicypris brevianalis (Boulenger, 1908)

Synonyms
- Neobola brevianalis Boulenger, 1908; Mesobola brevianalis (Boulenger 1908)

= River sardine =

Species of fish

The river sardine (Engraulicypris brevianalis), or hyphen barb, is an African species of [freshwater ray-finned fish belonging to the family Danionidae. It is found in the Cunene, Okavango, upper Zambezi river systems and east coastal rivers from the Limpopo to the Umfolozi in northern KwaZulu-Natal. It is also known from the middle Luapula in Zambia. Engraulicypris gariepinus is sometimes considered conspecific.
