= Malagarasi sardine =

Conservation status
- Least Concern (IUCN 3.1)

Scientific classification
- Kingdom: Animalia
- Phylum: Chordata
- Class: Actinopterygii
- Order: Cypriniformes
- Family: Danionidae
- Genus: Engraulicypris
- Species: E. spinifer

Binomial name
- Engraulicypris spinifer R. G. Bailey & Matthes, 1971

Synonyms
- Mesobola spinifer (Bailey & Matthes, 1971)

Species of fish

The Malagarasi sardine (Engraulicypris spinifer or Mesobola spinifer) is an East African species of freshwater fish in the family Danionidae. It is endemic to the Malagarasi River in Burundi and Tanzania. Its natural habitats are rivers, intermittent rivers, freshwater lakes, freshwater marshes, and inland deltas. It is threatened by habitat loss.
