= Engraulicypris bredoi =

Conservation status
- Vulnerable (IUCN 3.1)

Scientific classification
- Kingdom: Animalia
- Phylum: Chordata
- Class: Actinopterygii
- Order: Cypriniformes
- Family: Danionidae
- Genus: Engraulicypris
- Species: E. bredoi

Binomial name
- Engraulicypris bredoi Poll, 1945

Synonyms
- Mesobola bredoi (Poll, 1945); Neobola bredoi (Poll 1945)

Species of fish

Engraulicypris bredoi is an East African species of freshwater ray-finned fish belonging to the family Danionidae. It is endemic to Lake Albert in Uganda and the Democratic Republic of the Congo. Its natural habitats are rivers, intermittent rivers, freshwater lakes, freshwater marshes, and inland deltas. It is threatened by habitat loss.

== Etymology ==
The fish is named in honor of Belgian entomologist Hans J. Brédo (1903–1991), who collected the holotype specimen.
