= Riemvasmaak =

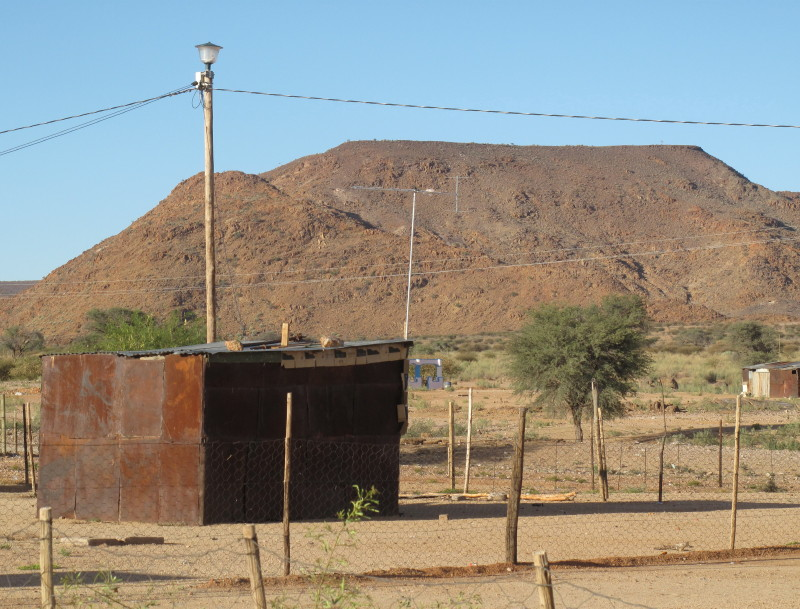
- Steel plate building in Riemvasmaak

- Location within Northern Cape Location within South Africa
- Coordinates: 28.383°S 20.083°E
- Country: South Africa
- Province: Northern Cape
- District: ZF Mgcawu
- Municipality: Kai !Garib

Area
  - Total: 1.04 km^{2} (0.40 sq mi)

Population (2011)
  - Total: 694
  - Density: 667/km^{2} (1,730/sq mi)

Racial makeup (2011)
  - Black African: 23.6%
  - Coloured: 43.7%
  - Indian/Asian: 0.1%
  - White: 0.3%
  - Other: 32.3%

First languages (2011)
  - Afrikaans: 95.3%
  - English: 1.4%
  - Xhosa: 1.0%
  - Other: 2.3%
- Time zone: UTC+2 (SAST)

Riemvasmaak is a settlement in ZF Mgcawu District Municipality in the Northern Cape province of South Africa. The name means ‘tighten the strap’ or ‘tied with straps’.

Riemvasmaak is located near the Orange River, close to the Namibian border. It was originally settled in the early 1930s by people of Xhosa, Damara, Herero, Nama, and Coloured origin, but in the early 1970s the community was sent back to their ethnic homelands by the apartheid government to make place for a military testing site. The Damara group was sent to Khorixas in South-West Africa (today Namibia) and became known as Riemvasmakers. They were given land by Damara Chief Justus ǁGaroëb to settle in that area.

In 1975, Riemvasmaak became a military testing site, Riemvasmaak Ranges, for live fire exercises of the SADF Armour, Artillery and Air Force until 1994. Long Range Artillery of calibres 120 mm and above, as well as air-to-ground rockets, cluster munitions and ground-to-ground rockets and missiles were tested. It also garrisoned a Company/Squadron of the 62nd Mechanized Infantry and two Companies of the 8 SAI of the SADF, co-located with a Target Locating Regiment of the SADF Artillery and a Rocket Artillery Battery. In 1998, a process of land restitution allowed the return of families and communities. Some of the Namibian Riemvasmakers returned but a residual group founded their own traditional authority. They are seeking recognition from the Namibian government to be recognised as a separate Damara clan.

The Riemvasmaakers land claim was successful and a large number returned to their ancestral lands in 1997.

The Melkbosrand area, consisting of the farms or areas known as Hartebeesvlak, Blousyfer and Wabrand that cover the northern side of the Augrabies Gorge and the Augrabies Falls National Park, was deproclaimed by parliament, withdrawing it from the national park, with the proviso that it be used for community-based eco-tourism and conservation. Opening to the public took place in 2015. A prominent local eco-tourism practitioner is Norbert Coetzee, celebrated for his long-running appearances in the TV series Voetspore.
