= Lake Malawi (Lake Nyasa) territorial dispute =

Ongoing dispute between Malawi and Tanzania

The Lake Malawi (Lake Nyasa) territorial dispute is a long-running diplomatic and legal disagreement between the Republic of Malawi and the United Republic of Tanzania over the location of the international boundary in the lake and ownership/sovereign rights to its waters and resources. The disagreement has historical roots in colonial treaties, intensified after the awarding of hydrocarbon exploration licences in the 2010s, and has been the subject of regional mediation efforts. In late 2024, Tanzania issued guidance to schools to use an official map showing the border running through the middle of the lake, a move that further highlighted the dispute in public debate.

== Background and historical origin ==
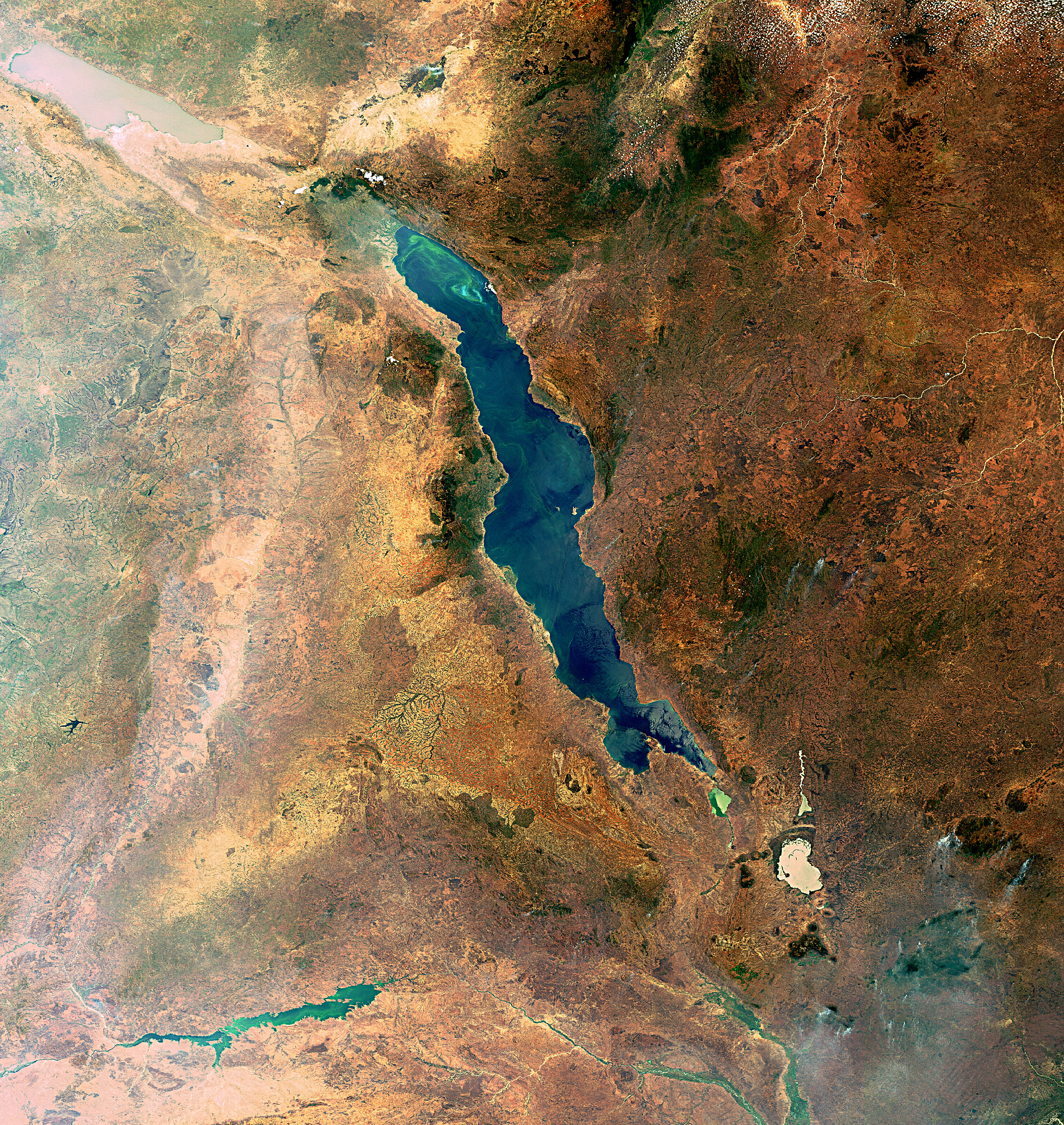
A satellite image of Lake Malawi (Great Rift Valley region). Shows the shape of the lake and surrounding geography

=== Colonial treaties and early claims ===
The immediate legal and cartographic origins of the dispute lie in late-19th century agreements between European powers. Under the 1890 Anglo-German (Heligoland–Zanzibar) arrangements and related colonial maps, the boundary between what became Nyasaland (Malawi) and German East Africa (later Tanganyika/Tanzania) was commonly represented along the Tanzanian (then German/British) shoreline, effectively placing the lake within the protectorate that became Malawi. The treaty and associated maps are the basis for Malawi’s position that the lake lies within Malawi’s territory.

=== Post-independence positions ===
On independence, both Tanzania and Malawi inherited complex and sometimes inconsistent colonial mapping. Malawi has historically treated the lake (except where it touches Mozambique) as largely within its jurisdiction and has used that position in national administration and resource management. Tanzania has intermittently contested that position, arguing the boundary should be delimited by an equidistance (median-line) principle for shared inland waters, or that colonial map evidence is ambiguous and insufficient to bar a negotiated or legally adjudicated change. Academic and legal reviews note that the parties’ positions have shifted at times and that colonial cartography and treaty texts are interpreted differently by each side.

== Legal arguments ==
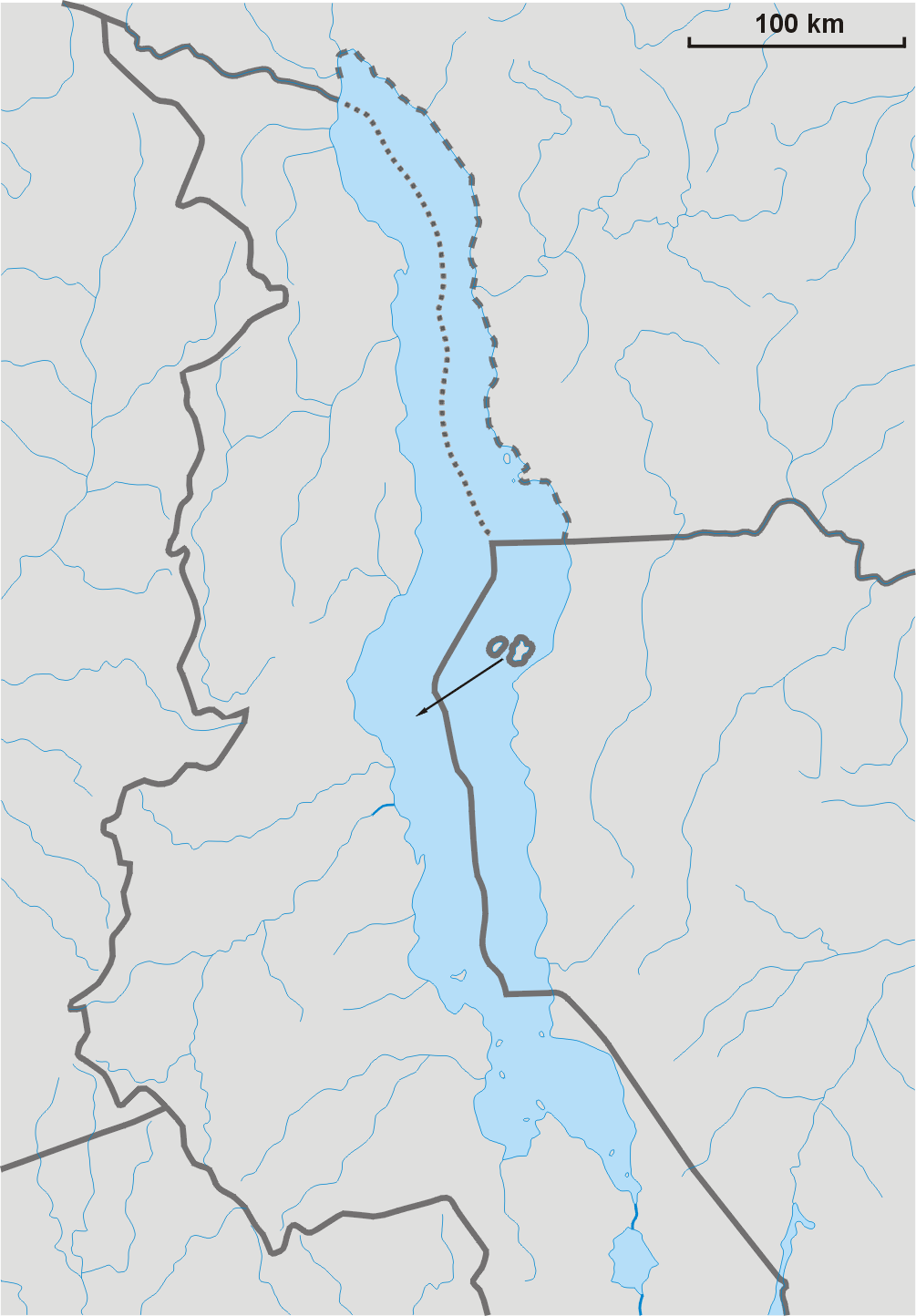
A map showing Malawi’s current border claim and Tanzania’s claim (median line) over Lake Nyasa / Malawi boundary

=== Malawi’s legal case ===
Malawi’s principal legal claim rests on succession to the colonial boundaries established or recognized by the 19th-century Anglo-German arrangements and subsequent British cartographic practice. Malawi argues that the colonial boundary — interpreted as running along the Tanzanian shore — was never lawfully altered and that the principle of uti possidetis juris (respect for inherited boundaries at independence) supports Malawi’s sovereignty claims over the lake. Scholarly analyses cite treaty texts and colonial records in support of Malawi’s stated position.

=== Tanzania’s legal case ===
Tanzania argues that modern principles of international law applicable to waters and maritime delimitation (including relevant provisions in UNCLOS and customary delimitation practice) support delimiting shared inland waters by an equitable approach, often implemented by a median-line division where there is no special circumstances justification to the contrary. Tanzania also contends that colonial maps and agreements do not conclusively demonstrate a boundary that awards entire or substantial parts of the lake exclusively to Malawi. Analysts note Tanzania’s reliance on a combination of legal argumentation and alternative cartographic interpretations.

== Trigger events and resource interests ==
=== Hydrocarbon exploration and the 2011–2013 escalation ===
The dispute became prominent in international media and diplomatic channels after Malawi awarded offshore oil exploration licences in the lake in 2011–2012 (notably to companies such as Surestream Petroleum and partners). Tanzania objected to unilateral exploration activity in areas it considered disputed, which led to heightened diplomatic exchanges and the referral of the matter for regional attention. The presence of potential petroleum resources and fishing and transport interests raised the stakes for both governments.

=== Fisheries, livelihoods and ecology ===
Beyond hydrocarbons, the lake supports dense artisanal fishing communities, biodiversity (notably endemic cichlid fish), transport routes, and tourism — all of which mean that any boundary arrangement affects livelihoods and natural-resource governance. Conservation and local economic interests have frequently been cited by observers as reasons to seek stable, cooperative arrangements regardless of longer legal contestation.

=== Port construction at Mbamba Bay controversy ===
In February 2024, Malawi formally protested Tanzania’s plan to upgrade and expand Mbamba Bay Port on Lake Malawi / Lake Nyasa, arguing that Tanzania had proceeded without Malawi’s consent while the lake boundary dispute remains unresolved. Malawi’s diplomatic note described the work as “irregular and illegal,” requesting that construction be halted pending consultations and recognition of Malawi’s “historical and legal entitlement to the entire Lake Malawi”. Tanzania previously awarded a $31.8 million contract in early January 2024 to China’s Xiamen Ongoing Construction Group for the project.

== Mediation and diplomatic efforts ==
=== SADC and regional mediation ===
Southern African Development Community organs and a panel of former African heads of state were engaged in efforts to mediate the dispute in the 2010s. Retired Mozambican President Joaquim Chissano was reported as part of mediation initiatives; the process sought to cool tensions, create space for negotiation, and avoid escalation while seeking a durable outcome, but by several accounts mediation stalled or progressed slowly. Scholarly and policy reports emphasise the political sensitivity and technical complexity of reaching a final delimitation without mutual agreement.

=== Status as of late 2024–2025 ===
By late 2024 and into 2025, public statements and media reporting showed continued disagreement but little evidence of a final legal adjudication or mutually accepted delimitation. Public measures and symbolic acts (including educational mapping guidance in Tanzania) kept the dispute in the political spotlight, while both states continued to emphasise diplomacy and avoidance of armed conflict. (See the section on the Tanzania school map directive below.)

== 2024 school maps controversy in Tanzania ==
In December 2024, Tanzanian education authorities circulated a directive asking teachers to use a Tanzanian official map that depicts the international boundary in Lake Malawi/Nyasa as running through the middle of the lake rather than along the shoreline. The memorandum and related public statements said the guidance was intended to ensure consistency with Tanzania’s official position and to avoid the use of third-party maps (including some online mapping platforms) that Tanzania described as inaccurate. Malawian media and commentators reported the directive and treated it as a notable, symbolic escalation in public messaging about the dispute. Observers described such instructions as part of broader state practices (cartographic policy and education) that can influence public perceptions while formal negotiations continue.

== International law and adjudication options ==
=== Law of the sea, inland waters, and delimitation practice ===
Analysts note that delimitation of inland and boundary waters frequently draws on a mixture of treaty interpretation (historical documents), principles found in international law (including UNCLOS for maritime delimitation by coastal states), and equity-based approaches used by international courts and tribunals. For lakes shared by adjacent states, adjudicators have sometimes used median-line methods unless there are strong historical or legal reasons to do otherwise. The Malawi–Tanzania dispute illustrates an unresolved tension between treaty-based succession claims and contemporary delimitation practice.

=== Possible settlement pathways ===
Possible legal and political pathways to settlement include: bilateral negotiation to agree a delimitation (possibly with resource-sharing arrangements), regional mediation (SADC/AU facilitation), recourse to an international adjudicative body (International Court of Justice or an arbitral tribunal) should both parties agree to submit the dispute, or negotiated management regimes that de-emphasise sovereignty claims while protecting resource use. Scholarly commentators emphasise the benefits of negotiated cooperation given the social and ecological importance of the lake.

== Reactions, domestic politics, and public discourse ==
Public and political reactions in both countries have at times reflected national sentiment and political considerations. In Malawi the lake is central to national identity and economy; in Tanzania the claim to an equitable share of the waters is presented as a matter of principle and cartographic accuracy. Media coverage, political commentary, and social media have amplified these narratives; independent commentators and academics have urged calm, legal clarity, and cooperative resource governance to avoid harm to fisheries and livelihoods.

== See also ==
- Lake Malawi
- Heligoland–Zanzibar Treaty
- United Nations Convention on the Law of the Sea
