= Augrabies schotiaphaga =

Scientific classification
- Kingdom: Animalia
- Phylum: Arthropoda
- Class: Insecta
- Order: Coleoptera
- Suborder: Polyphaga
- Infraorder: Elateriformia
- Family: Buprestidae
- Genus: Augrabies; Bellamy, 1987
- Species: A. schotiaphaga

Binomial name
- Augrabies schotiaphaga Bellamy, 1987

Species of beetle

Augrabies schotiaphaga is a species of beetle in the family Buprestidae, the only species in the genus Augrabies.
