= Keimoes =

Keimoes Kai mãs (Khoekhoe)
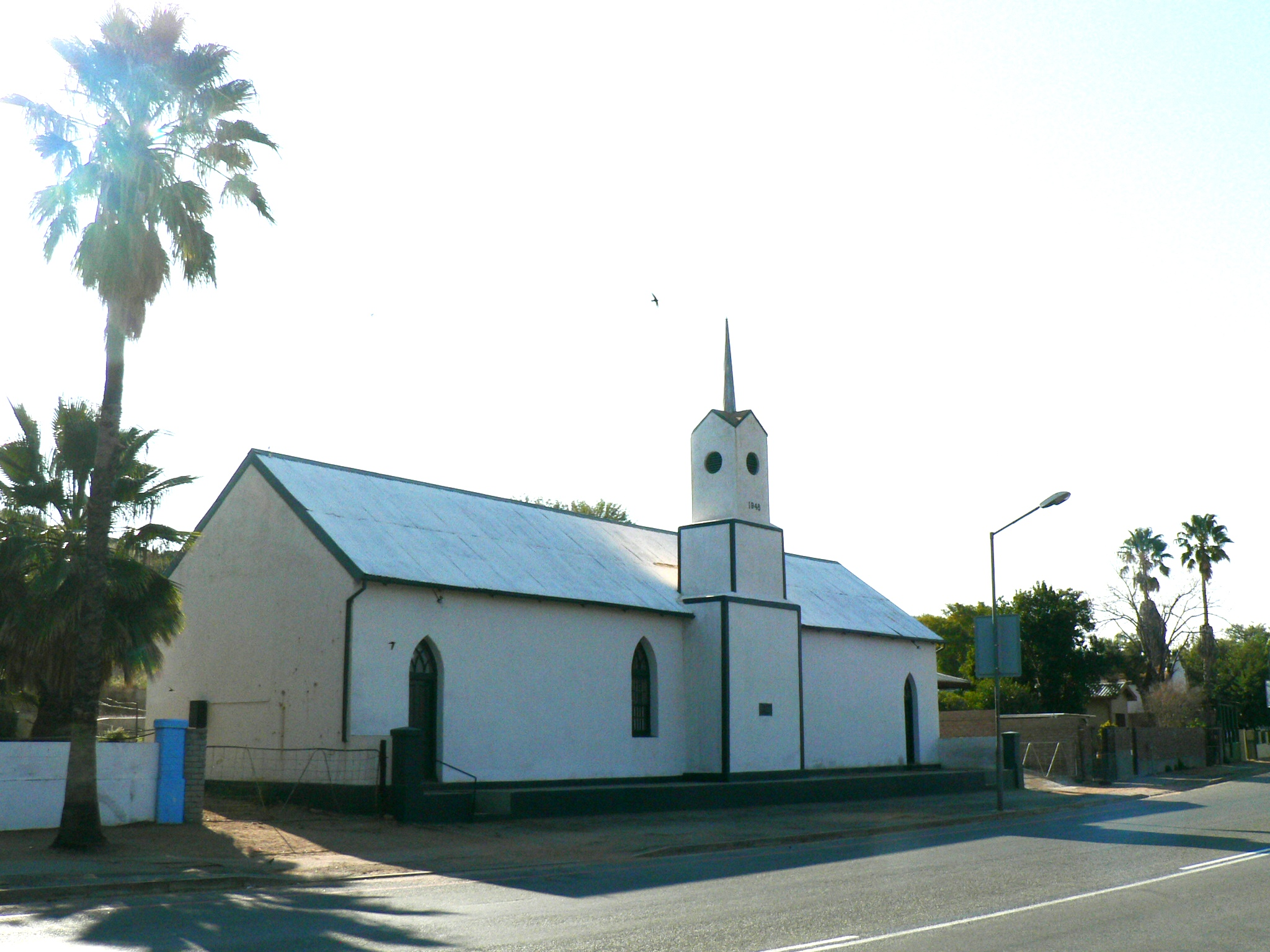
- Old Mission Church, Keimoes

- Location within Northern Cape Location within South Africa
- Coordinates: 28°42′S 20°58′E
- Country: South Africa
- Province: Northern Cape
- District: ZF Mgcawu
- Municipality: Kai !Garib

Area
  - Total: 26.28 km^{2} (10.15 sq mi)

Population (2011)
  - Total: 12,000
  - Density: 460/km^{2} (1,200/sq mi)

Racial makeup (2011)
  - Black African: 3.2%
  - Coloured: 90.5%
  - Indian/Asian: 1.0%
  - White: 4.8%
  - Other: 0.5%

First languages (2011)
  - Afrikaans: 96.2%
  - Tswana: 1.2%
  - Other: 2.6%
- Time zone: UTC+2 (SAST)
- Postal code (street): 8860
- PO box: 8860
- Area code: 054

Keimoes (Khoekhoe: Kai mãs) is a town in the Northern Cape province of South Africa. It lies on the Orange River and is about halfway between Upington and Kakamas.

== History ==
It attained municipal status in 1949. The name of the town translates in both the Khoekhoe and Khoemana languages. The first translation from Khoekhoe means "large eye". At the Roman Catholic Mission Station in the town there is a natural water fountain called Big Eye or Keimoes. The "big eye" may also come from the vast views that can be seen from the Tierberg, a small mountain outside the town. The second translation is taken from the Khoemana language. The town is said to have gotten the name in the 1860s from Klaas Lukas, a Khoemana leader Klaas Lukas called it Keimoes (‘mouse nest’) after the colonies of mice living there.

The discovery of Middle Stone Age stone tools such as, blades, points, scrapers and one adze found in Keimoes confirms the prehistoric activity in the town. An irrigation system was built in 1882 and in 1883 a second furrow was added to the system. These furrows contributed to the advancement of the town and in the following years many families started moving to the area. In 1887 a school was opened, with Pieter Rossouw as its first teacher. The school was closed again in 1899, due to the start of the South African War or second Anglo-Boer War. By 1910, Keimoes had its own hotel, prison, court and police service. In 1951, Keimoes opened its own power station and the town was powered by electricity.

== Agriculture ==
Keimoes lies on the Orange River Valley making the region suitable for growing and cultivating fruit such as grapes, peaches and watermelon. Keimoes is famous for producing sultanas which are exported around the world. Wine is also a source of income to the town with one of the largest wine co-operatives, Orange River Wine Cellars, situated in Keimoes.

== Attractions ==
- The Dutch Reformed Church was built in 1889 by Reverend Schroeder. Due to its historical significance the church has been declared a national monument in 1978 and is now a Provincial Heritage Site.
- The Tierberg ‘Tiger Mountain’ Nature Reserve lies 4 km outside Keimoes. The reserve covers an area of 160 hectares. It is significant because it is home to large Aloes, numerous species of succulents, springbok and views of the Orange River Valley.
- There are a number of irrigation canals which run through Keimoes. The canal which runs along Main Road was completed in 1883 and still supplies water to the area.
- In 1978, the Persian water wheel was declared a national monument. It is now a Provincial Heritage Site. It has been restored and it is still in use on an irrigation canal along the main road of Keimoes.

== See also ==
- Baster
- South African Wine
- Khoe Languages
