= Putsonderwater =

- Location within Northern Cape Location within South Africa
- Coordinates: 29°14′0″S 21°53′0″E
- Country: South Africa
- Province: Northern Cape
- District: ZF Mgcawu
- Municipality: !Kheis
- Time zone: UTC+2 (SAST)
- Area code: 054

Putsonderwater (formerly Putzonderwater) is an abandoned settlement in !Kheis Local Municipality in the Northern Cape province of South Africa. It is located on the R383 road from Kenhardt to Marydale. Translated from Afrikaans, the name means "well without water".

In Afrikaans, the term Putsonderwater is used to indicate a far-off place, in the middle of nowhere similar to how Timbuktu, Woop Woop or Brigadoon are used in English.

== Name origins ==
The town was allegedly first called Krombegin (Skewed Beginning).

One story told regarding the settlement's name goes as follows: Voortrekkers who left the Cape Colony 1838, had arrived in the Northern Cape at the place known today as “Putsonderwater”. As they stayed over there, it started to rain heavily. The water rose it covered the buckets of tar (called teerputs in Afrikaans) that were hung under the wagons, so the farmers called the place "Puts Onder Water" (“tar bucket under water”). This however does not explain the Dutch spelling of "Putzonderwater", and is considered a flight of fancy by André Brink.

Another version claims that a local called David Ockhuis dug a well in the 1880s but was loath to share the water with passers-by, and would claim that his well had no water. When the land was later divided, the one farm was called Putzonderwater and the other called Middelka.

== Railway station ==
The railway siding was named Putsonderwater (with the Afrikaans "s"). Putzonderwater once won certificates for being the neatest railway station in South Africa. Now, there are only four families left.

== In popular culture ==
Bartho Smit wrote the play Putsonderwater in 1962, but it could not be performed in South Africa because of its political message.
