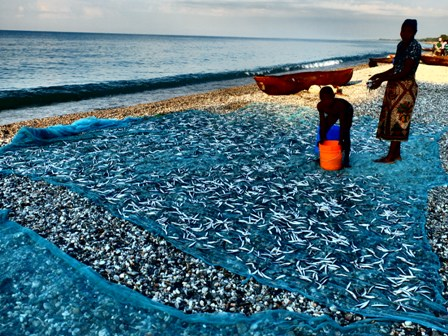
- Lake Malawi sardines spread out to dry on the shore of Lake Malawi

Conservation status
- Least Concern (IUCN 3.1)

Scientific classification
- Kingdom: Animalia
- Phylum: Chordata
- Class: Actinopterygii
- Order: Cypriniformes
- Family: Danionidae
- Genus: Engraulicypris
- Species: E. sardella

Binomial name
- Engraulicypris sardella (Günther, 1868)

Synonyms
- Barilius sardella Günther, 1868; Engraulicypris pinguis Günther, 1894

= Lake Malawi sardine =

Species of fish

The Lake Malawi sardine, lake sardine, or usipa (Engraulicypris sardella), is an African species of freshwater fish in the family Danionidae. It is endemic to Lake Malawi and its outlet, the (upper) Shire River; it is found in Malawi, Mozambique, and Tanzania.

The Lake Malawi sardine is an important fishery species in Lake Malawi, both as a food fish and as bait. It is a pelagic, shoaling species that feeds on zooplankton. It grows to a maximum size of 13 cm (5.1 in) TL, though commonly they are smaller.

Usipa plays a significant role in the economic livelihood for many households at Lake Malawi that rely upon fishing for income. Because of its small size, it is commonly dried. Usipa is mostly eaten in Malawi and Mozambique along with nsima ugali. Dried usipa is sold at most markets in Malawi. In Malawi, usipa is typically consumed with the bones in it due to their softness.
