= Louisvale =

Louisvale Road
- Location within Northern Cape Location within South Africa
- Coordinates: 28.572°S 21.197°E
- Country: South Africa
- Province: Northern Cape
- District: ZF Mgcawu
- Municipality: Dawid Kruiper

Government
  - Type: Ward 12
  - Councillor: Monica Kock

Area
  - Total: 0.80 km^{2} (0.31 sq mi)

Population (2011)
  - Total: 1,585
  - Density: 2,000/km^{2} (5,100/sq mi)

Racial makeup (2011)
  - Black African: 7.6%
  - Coloured: 85.2%
  - Indian/Asian: 1.4%
  - White: 0.9%
  - Other: 4.9%

First languages (2011)
  - Afrikaans: 92.9%
  - Tswana: 2.7%
  - Other: 4.4%
- Time zone: UTC+2 (SAST)
- Postal code (street): 8809
- PO box: 8809
- Area code: 054

Louisvale is a town in ZF Mgcawu District Municipality in the Northern Cape province of South Africa. It has been described as a "small, impoverished town" by the Mail & Guardian, and it briefly became notorious for the baby Tshepang case, regarding the rape of a nine-month-old baby in 2001.

The Louisvale Pirates football team hails from this town.
