= Kakamas =

Town in Northern Cape, South Africa

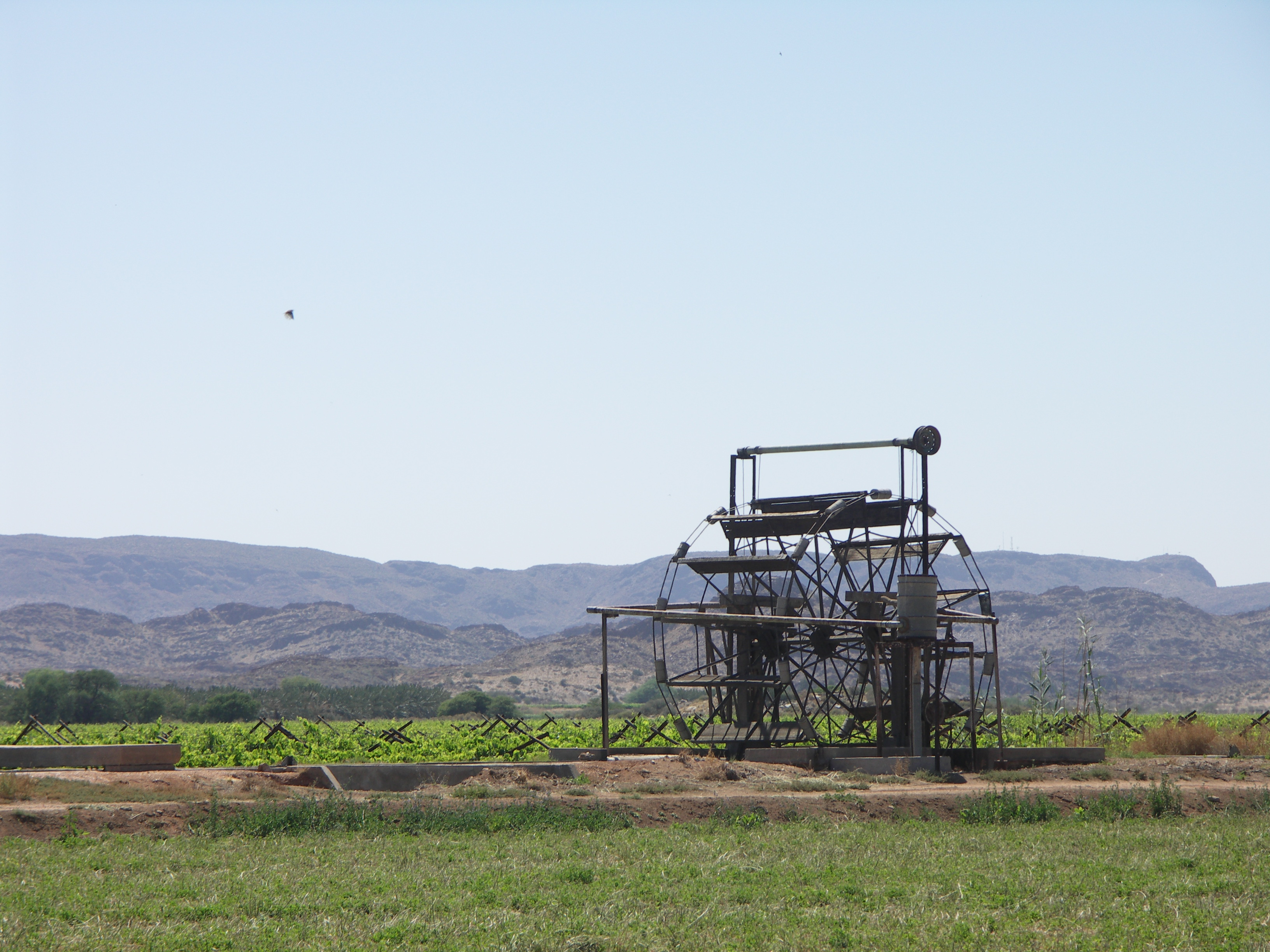
- A water wheel in Kakamas

- Location within Northern Cape Location within South Africa Location within Africa
- Coordinates: 28°48′S 20°39′E
- Country: South Africa
- Province: Northern Cape
- District: ZF Mgcawu
- Municipality: Kai !Garib
- Established: 1898

Area
  - Total: 4.55 km^{2} (1.76 sq mi)
- Elevation: 670 m (2,200 ft)

Population (2011)
  - Total: 9,538
  - Density: 2,100/km^{2} (5,430/sq mi)

Racial makeup (2011)
  - Black African: 7.0%
  - Coloured: 81.6%
  - Indian/Asian: 0.9%
  - White: 9.6%
  - Other: 1.0%

First languages (2011)
  - Afrikaans: 93.5%
  - Tswana: 2.3%
  - English: 1.6%
  - Other: 2.7%
- Time zone: UTC+2 (SAST)
- Postal code (street): 8870
- PO box: 8870
- Area code: 054

Kakamas is a town founded in 1898 and located in the Northern Cape province of South Africa, on the banks of the Orange River.

Originated as at a place where the Orange River could be relatively easily crossed. The spot was first known as Bassonsdrif. In 1898 a proper settlement was established and under the auspices of the Dutch Reformed Church the area was developed as an agricultural spot. It became a municipality in 1954.

== History ==
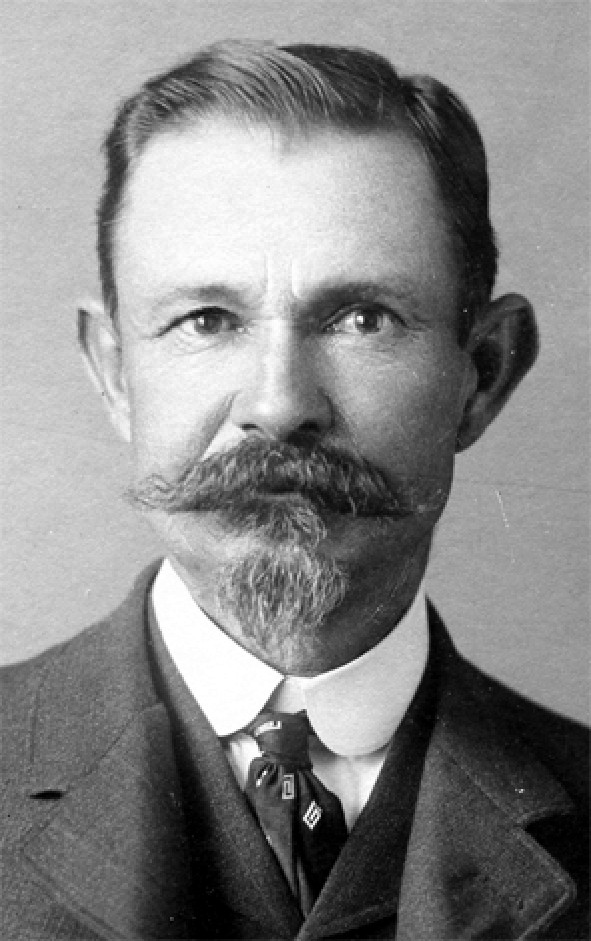
Japie Lutz

The small town of Kakamas was built on the sheer hard work and determination of a couple of impoverished stock farmers at the end of the 19th century. The drought of 1895–97 was followed by an outbreak of rinderpest, leaving many farmers destitute.

In 1897, the Dutch Reformed Church started a "colony" on the farms Soetap and Kakamas on the banks of the Orange River for white people who had lost everything as a result of the drought.

Ignoring the criticism of qualified engineers about their building methods, the farmers continued to construct the water canals by hand that are still used today to supply the town and surrounding area with water for irrigation. For their efforts, they were each awarded the right to one of the irrigation plots. The men worked extremely hard even taking the yoke themselves, rather than wasting precious time in launching a time-consuming search for oxen and donkeys grazing somewhere in the veld.

The exceptional dry piling of the stone along rocky slopes can still be seen today. By dry piling instead of excavating through rock, the farmers were able to cut the overall costs of the canals considerably.

The ingenuity of the workers under the leadership of Japie Lutz is aptly demonstrated in the workmanship at the water tunnels in the northern canal. Mr Piet Burger perfected the water wheel that was widely used in Kakamas. This pumping device almost led to a court case about patent rights, when a blacksmith who used to live in Kakamas registered the patent in 1922.

The Commission that ran the "colony" planned ahead and in 1912 building operations on a hydro-electric power station and turbine in the northern canal were started. Ultimately the power station, built to look like an Egyptian temple, generated enough electricity that Kakamas liaised with Upington about the possibility of supplying Upington with electricity as well.

== Economy ==
The economy of this town is based on farming, and thanks to irrigation from the Orange River farmers from the Kakamas area are now prime exporters of table grapes to Europe and England. The region also exports peaches, dried fruit, raisins, oranges and dates.

== Name origins ==
The name Kakamas was originally given to a drift that was known as Takemas or T’Kakamas since 1779. The name means "place of the raging cow" – probably referring to an incident when a raging cow stormed the Korana while they were herding their cattle through this ford.

To some the town's name originates from the Khoi word "gagamas" (brown), referring to the red clay of the area with which women daub their faces. To most, though, Kakamas is a Korana word meaning "poor pasture".

Today, the name reflects poorly on a fertile valley in the Lower Orange River, graced with vineyards, cotton and lucern fields.

== Schools ==
Kakamas has numerous schools. Among them is Martin Oosthuizen High School which held their centennial celebrations in 2020. (www.hmoskool.co.za). Other schools include:

Laerskool Sentraal

Laerskool Oranje-Suid

Laerskool Kakamas

Laerskool Lutzburg

Hoërskool Kakamas

== Notable people associated with Kakamas ==
- Allan Boesak, Dutch Reformed Church cleric, politician and anti-apartheid activist
