= Upington =

Upington ǁKhara hais (Khoekhoe) Olyvenhoutsdrift (Afrikaans)
- Town
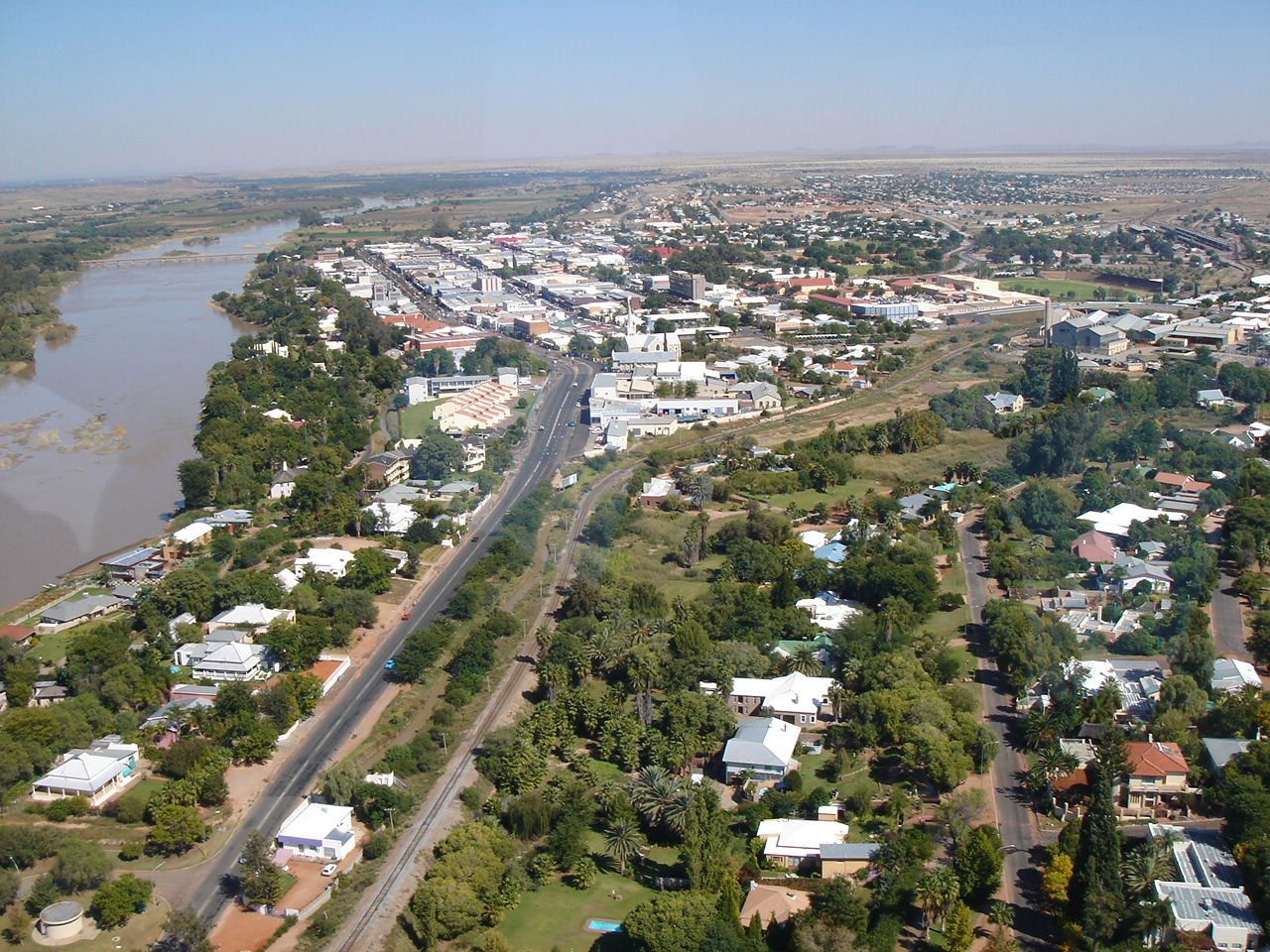
- Aerial view of Upington's Central Business District

- Location within Northern Cape Location within South Africa Location within Africa
- Coordinates: 28.45°S 21.25°E
- Country: South Africa
- Province: Northern Cape
- District: ZF Mgcawu
- Municipality: Dawid Kruiper
- Established: 1873

Government
  - Type: Local Municipality
  - Mayor: Limakatso Koloi (ANC)

Area
  - Total: 580.8 km^{2} (224.2 sq mi)
- Elevation: 835 m (2,740 ft)

Population (2011)
  - Total: 74,834
  - Density: 128.8/km^{2} (333.7/sq mi)

Racial makeup (2011)
  - Black African: 25.6%
  - Coloured: 62.6%
  - Indian/Asian: 0.6%
  - White: 10.1%
  - Other: 1.1%

First languages (2011)
  - Afrikaans: 85.5%
  - Xhosa: 6.1%
  - Tswana: 3.2%
  - English: 2.1%
  - Other: 3.1%
- Time zone: UTC+2 (SAST)
- Postal code (street): 8800
- PO box: 8800
- Area code: +27 (0)54
- Website: www.kharahais.gov.za www.greenkalahari.co.za

Upington (Khoekhoe: ǁKhara hais) is a town founded in 1873 and located in the Northern Cape province of South Africa, on the banks of the Orange River. The town was originally called Olyvenhoutsdrift ('Olive wood drift'), due to the abundance of olive wood trees in the area, but later renamed after Sir Thomas Upington, Attorney-General and then Prime Minister of the Cape. It originated as a mission station established in 1871 and run by Reverend Christiaan Schröder. The mission station now houses the Kalahari Orange Museum. The museum is also the home of a donkey statue, which recognises the enormous contribution that this animal made to the development of the region during the pioneering days of the 19th century.

The elevation of Upington is 2,742 feet (835 metres). It is the closest large centre to the Augrabies Falls (arguably the greatest of South African waterfalls) and the Kgalagadi Transfrontier Park. The landscape is very arid but the soil is fertile and crops such as fruit are grown in irrigated fields. The area is best known for its export-quality grapes, raisins and wines, which are cultivated on the rich flood plains of the Orange River.

== The Upington 26 ==
On 13 November 1985, a black policeman was killed following a disturbance at a political meeting in Paballelo, a black township on the outskirts of Upington. Twenty-six people were charged with the killing, of whom twenty-five were convicted of murder on the basis of common purpose, and one convicted of attempted murder. Fourteen were sentenced to death, although the death sentences were later overturned on appeal. In 2011, a memorial in honour of the Upington 26 was unveiled in Upington by Hazel Jenkins, the Premier of the Northern Cape. In 2014, the Australian film A Common Purpose was made about the case.

== Wine industry ==
Upington's most famous wines are produced by an organisation known as Orange River Cellars. The organisation has six depots in the area (all of them on the banks of the Orange River) at Upington, Kanoneiland, Grootdrink, Kakamas, Keimoes and Groblershoop. Their wines are exported, inter alia, to Europe and the USA.

== Transportation ==
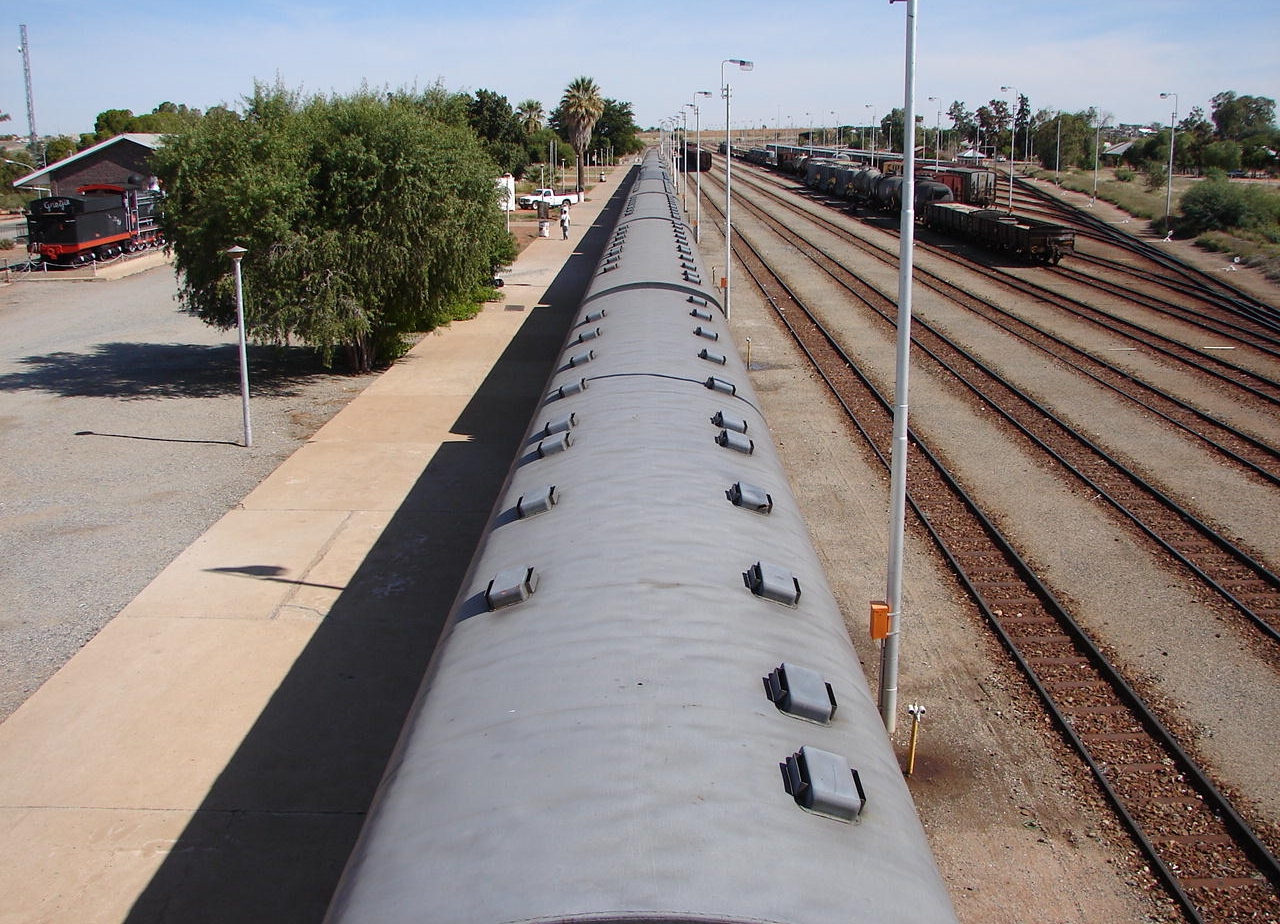
Passenger train in Upington station

Upington Airport has scheduled flights provided by SA Airlink. Due to the combination of high elevation and temperature, one of the airport's runways is 4,900 m long (the fourth longest in the world), and thus allows Boeing 747 and other heavy aircraft to use the airport without limitations on take-off weight.

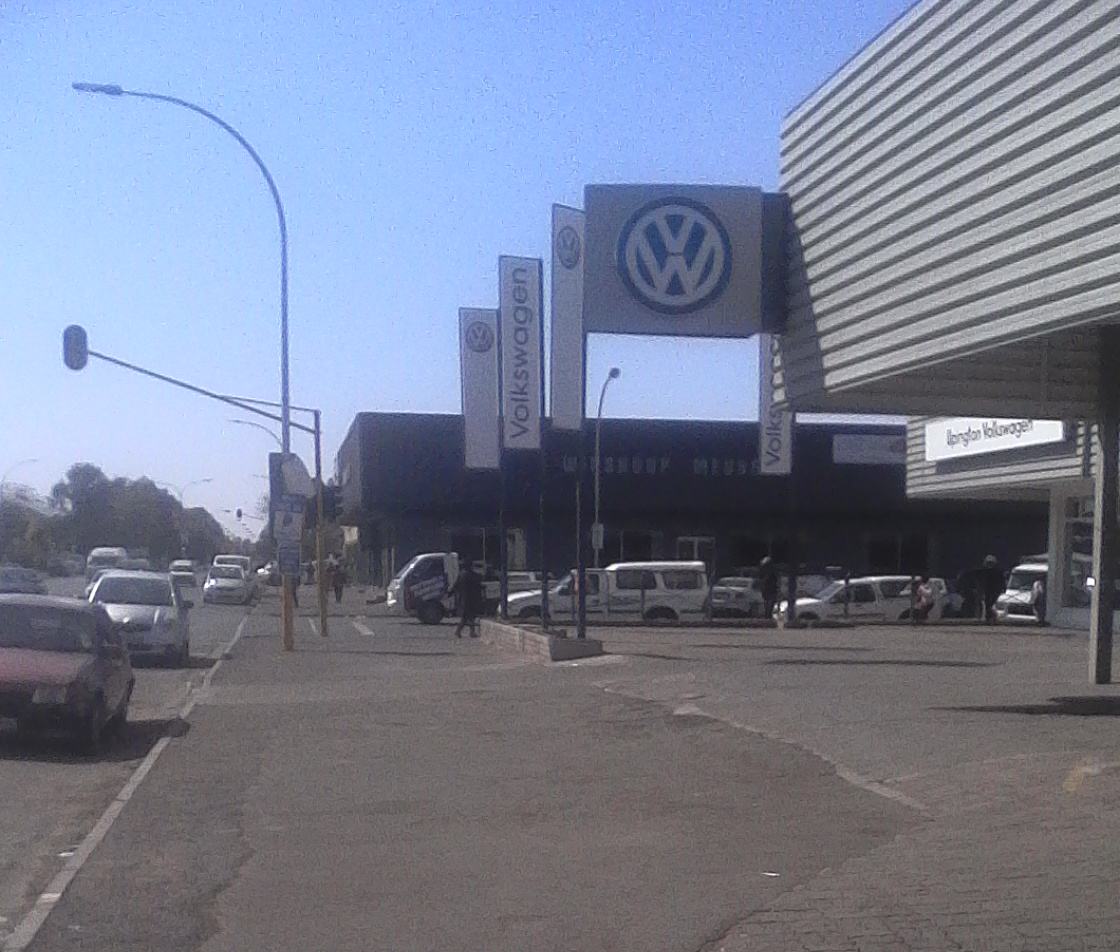
Nelson Mandela Drive in the Upington CBD

In the first half of the 20th century, there was a passenger train service from Cape Town to Upington. Until the 1950s, a narrow-gauge railway line (two-foot gauge) ran from Upington to Kakamas and Keimoes, two nearby towns. The trains carried passengers and freight, being mainly dried fruit. The line to Kakamas was still in use during the November 2010 grape harvest season.

== Public institutions ==
There are four libraries that serve the community in Upington, viz, Rosedale Library, Upington Library, Korrektiewe and Forum Library.

== Geography and climate ==
Upington

Climate chart (precipitation, max. and min. temperature)
J	F	M	A	M	J	J	A	S	O	N	D
24 36 20	35 34 20	37 32 18	26 28 13	10 24 8	4 21 5	2 21 4	4 23 6	4 27 9	9 30 13	17 33 16	17 35 19
- █ Average max. and min. temperatures in °C
- █ Precipitation totals in mm
- Source: SAWS
Imperial conversion
J	F	M	A	M	J	J	A	S	O	N	D
0.9 97 68	1.4 93 68	1.5 90 64	1 82 55	0.4 75 46	0.2 70 41	0.1 70 39	0.2 73 43	0.2 81 48	0.4 86 55	0.7 91 61	0.7 95 66
- █ Average max. and min. temperatures in °F
- █ Precipitation totals in inches

Upington is located on the northern banks of the Orange River and is surrounded by irrigated vineyards. The hottest month of the year is January, with average daily temperatures swinging from 36 °C (97 °F) to 20 °C (68 °F), while in the coolest month of July temperatures range between 21 °C (70 °F) and 4 °C (39 °F). Also the driest month of the year, July sees an average rainfall of only 2 millimetres (0.079 in), while the wettest month of March sees 37 millimetres (1.5 in). Upington has been noted as being the sunniest location on the planet for three months of the year, from November through January.

Upington has a hot desert climate (BWh) with long, hot summers and short, mild winters. Precipitation peaks during late summertime.

Climate data for Upington (1991−2020, extremes 1951–1990)
Month	Jan	Feb	Mar	Apr	May	Jun	Jul	Aug	Sep	Oct	Nov	Dec	Year
Record high °C (°F)	42.3 (108.1)	44.1 (111.4)	42.3 (108.1)	38.1 (100.6)	33.7 (92.7)	30.4 (86.7)	29.5 (85.1)	33.6 (92.5)	39.3 (102.7)	40.5 (104.9)	42.0 (107.6)	44.4 (111.9)	44.4 (111.9)
Mean daily maximum °C (°F)	36.4 (97.5)	35.7 (96.3)	33.6 (92.5)	29.3 (84.7)	25.6 (78.1)	21.8 (71.2)	21.7 (71.1)	23.9 (75.0)	28.0 (82.4)	31.2 (88.2)	33.4 (92.1)	35.7 (96.3)	29.7 (85.5)
Daily mean °C (°F)	28.3 (82.9)	27.9 (82.2)	25.8 (78.4)	21.4 (70.5)	17.1 (62.8)	13.1 (55.6)	12.9 (55.2)	14.7 (58.5)	18.6 (65.5)	22.4 (72.3)	24.7 (76.5)	27.2 (81.0)	21.2 (70.2)
Mean daily minimum °C (°F)	20.2 (68.4)	20.0 (68.0)	17.9 (64.2)	13.4 (56.1)	8.6 (47.5)	4.3 (39.7)	4.1 (39.4)	5.4 (41.7)	9.2 (48.6)	13.5 (56.3)	16.0 (60.8)	18.6 (65.5)	12.6 (54.7)
Record low °C (°F)	6.7 (44.1)	7.6 (45.7)	4.7 (40.5)	−1.7 (28.9)	−5.2 (22.6)	−7.9 (17.8)	−7.8 (18.0)	−7.0 (19.4)	−3.5 (25.7)	−1.7 (28.9)	4.4 (39.9)	5.7 (42.3)	−7.9 (17.8)
Average precipitation mm (inches)	39.5 (1.56)	38.8 (1.53)	44.7 (1.76)	18.5 (0.73)	10.1 (0.40)	5.1 (0.20)	3.3 (0.13)	1.2 (0.05)	3.5 (0.14)	15.1 (0.59)	13.9 (0.55)	21.9 (0.86)	215.6 (8.49)
Average precipitation days (≥ 1.0 mm)	4.1	4.0	4.4	2.6	1.2	0.6	0.6	0.4	0.6	1.8	2.2	2.6	25.0
Average relative humidity (%)	33	39	44	49	49	50	45	39	35	33	31	30	40
Mean monthly sunshine hours	344.3	292.3	302.3	285.4	285.7	268.6	285.7	298.6	299.5	326.5	332.1	351.8	3,672.9
Source: NOAA (humidity 1961-1990), Deutscher Wetterdienst (extremes)

== Notable natives and residents ==
- Chris Brink – mathematician, vice-chancellor of Newcastle University in England, vice-chancellor and rector of Stellenbosch University
- Ruben Cloete – footballer for the South Africa national soccer team
- Alice Krige – actress
- Tiaan Strauss - rugby union player for Western Province and for the South African and for Australian national rugby union teams
- Shaleen Surtie-Richards - actress
- Christo Wiese - businessman
- Cobus Wiese - rugby union player
- Jasper Wiese – rugby union player for the South Africa national rugby union team

== Gallery ==
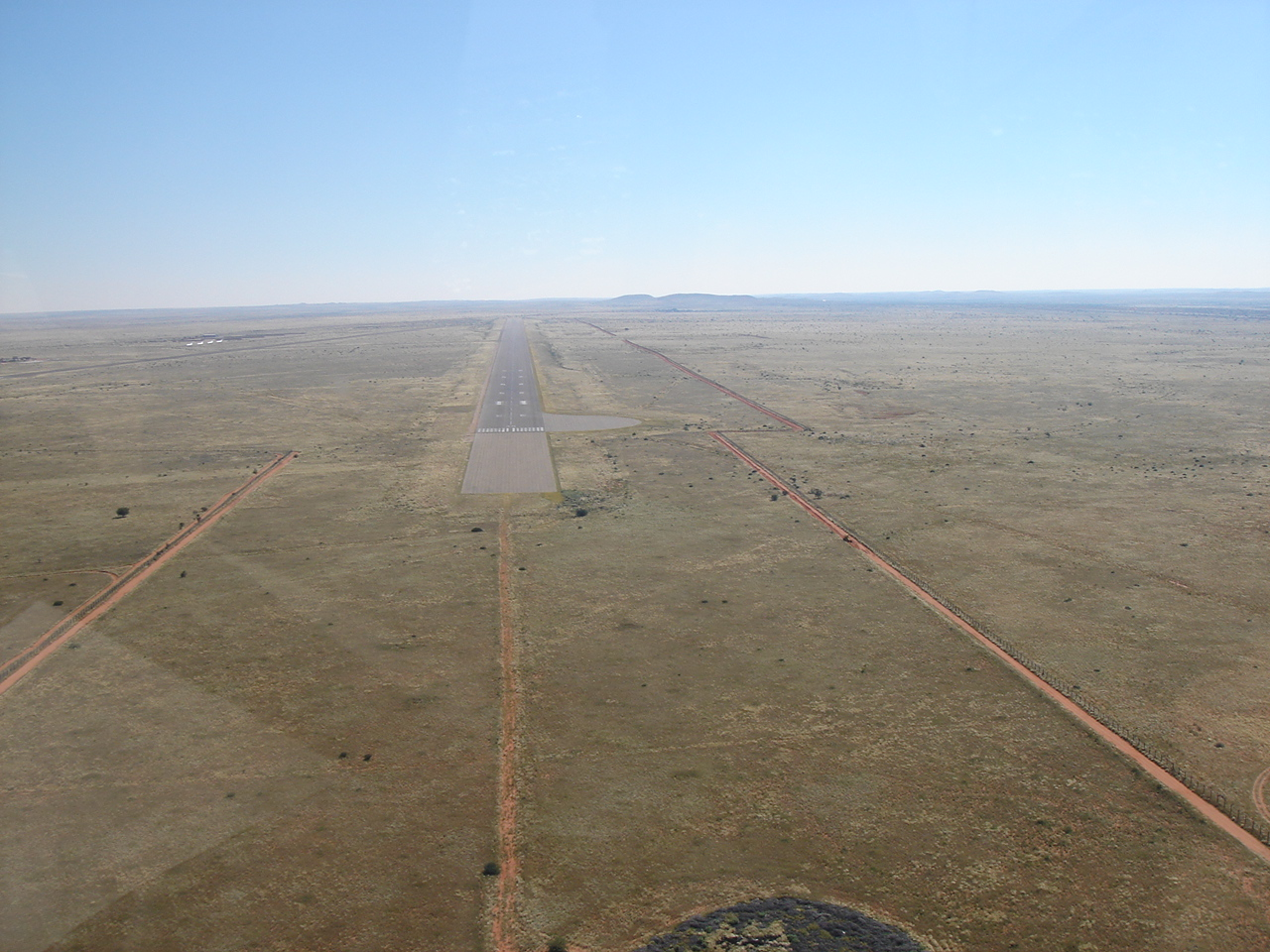
4900 m airport runway

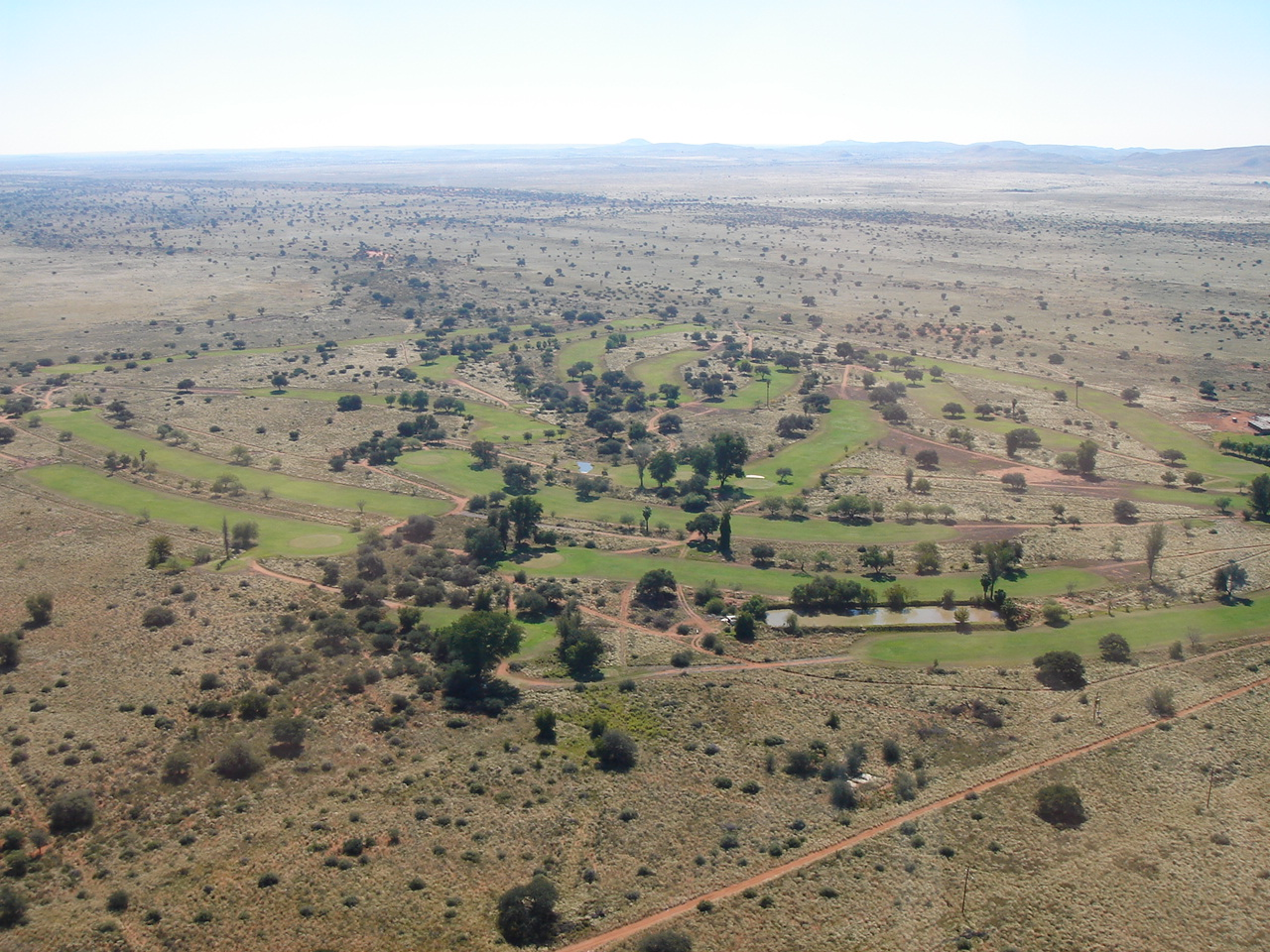
Golf course

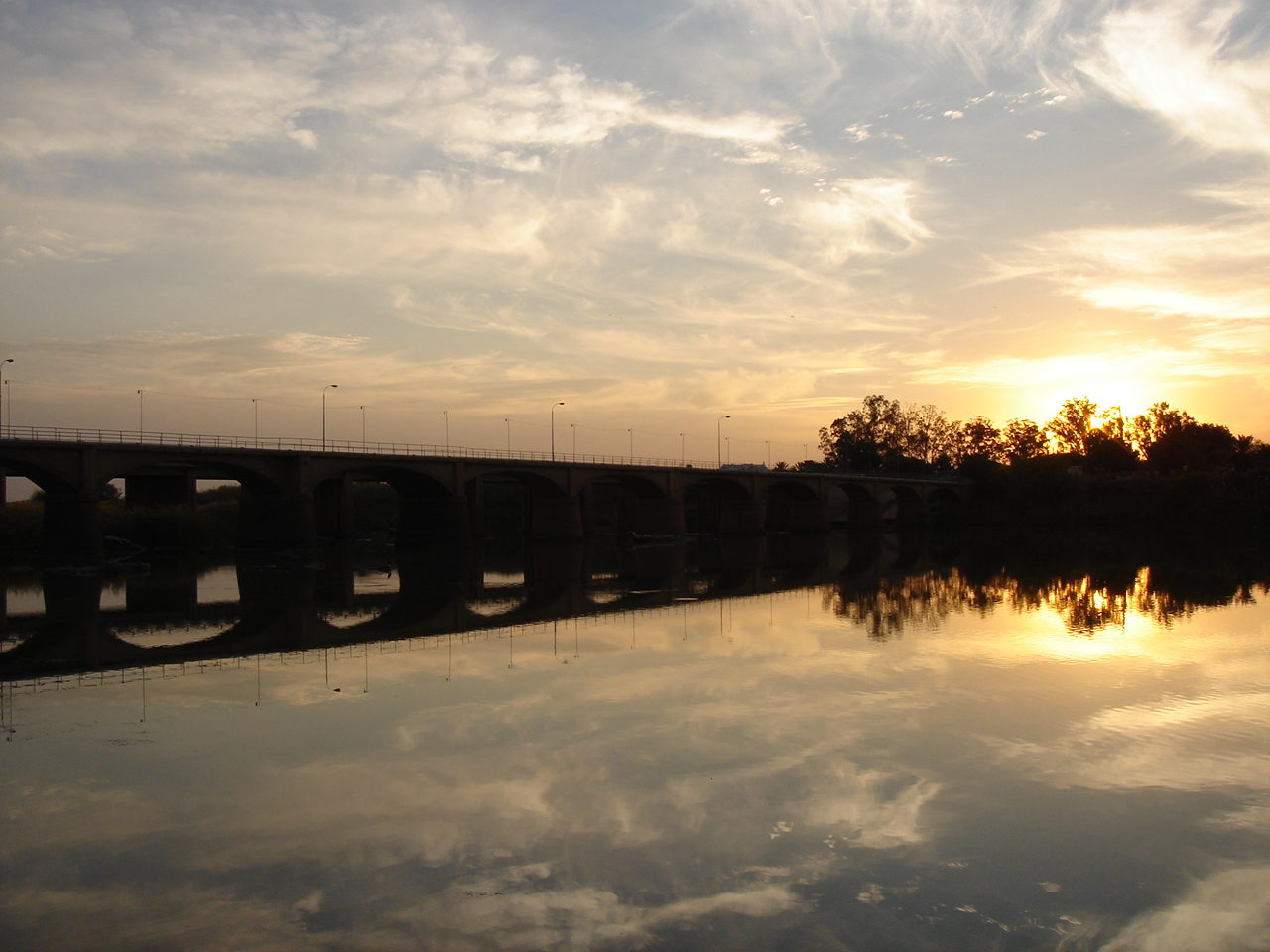
View from "Die Eiland" holiday resort

== Sport ==
Upington has a professional football club named Upington City F.C.

== See also ==
- Vastrap, South Africa's former nuclear weapons test range.
