= Augrabies Falls National Park =

National park in the Northern Cape, South Africa

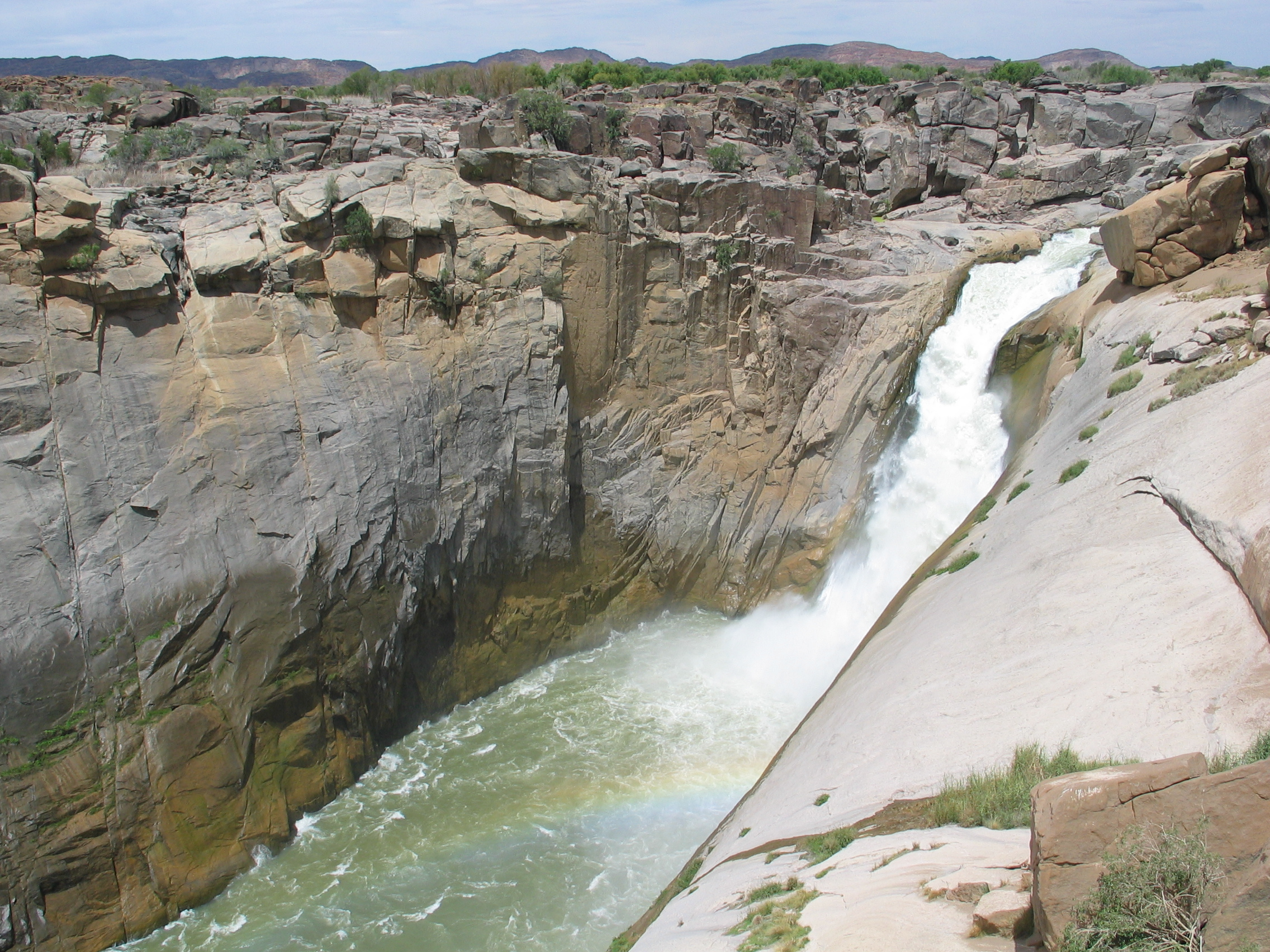
- The Augrabies Falls
- Location of the park
- Location: Northern Cape, South Africa
- Nearest city: Upington
- Coordinates: 28°35′28″S 20°20′18″E
- Area: 820 km^{2} (320 sq mi)
- Established: 1966; 60 years ago
- Governing body: South African National Parks
- Website: www.sanparks.org/parks/augrabies-falls
- Augrabies Falls National Park (South Africa) Augrabies Falls National Park (Northern Cape)

Augrabies Falls National Park is a national park located around the Augrabies Falls, about 120 km (75 mi) west of Upington in the Northern Cape Province, South Africa.

The Augrabies Falls National Park covers an area of 820 km^{2} (320 sq mi) and stretches along the Orange River. The area is very arid. The waterfall is about 60 m (200 ft) high and is awe-inspiring when the river is in flood. The gorge below the falls averages about 240 m (790 ft) deep and runs for 18 km (11 mi). The gorge provides an impressive example of erosion into a granitic basement.

The park was established in 1966.

== Original inhabitants ==
The original Khoekhoe people named the waterfall Ankoerebis, meaning the "place of great noise". The Khoi and San communities within the greater national park inhabit domed huts called matjiehuise, 'mat houses'. The huts are ideal for both hot and cold climates. During hot temperatures the tree stems from which the mats are created shrink, which allows gaps to appear – creating a cooling ventilation system. The inverse occurs during cold climates, as the stems expand to keep the cold out. The Trekboers who later settled in the area derived the name Augrabies. The name is sometimes spelt Aughrabies. There are many deposits of alluvial diamonds along the Orange River and legend has it that the biggest cache of diamonds in the world lies in the swirl-hole eroded into the granite at the foot of the waterfall by the thundering waters.

== Animal and plant life ==
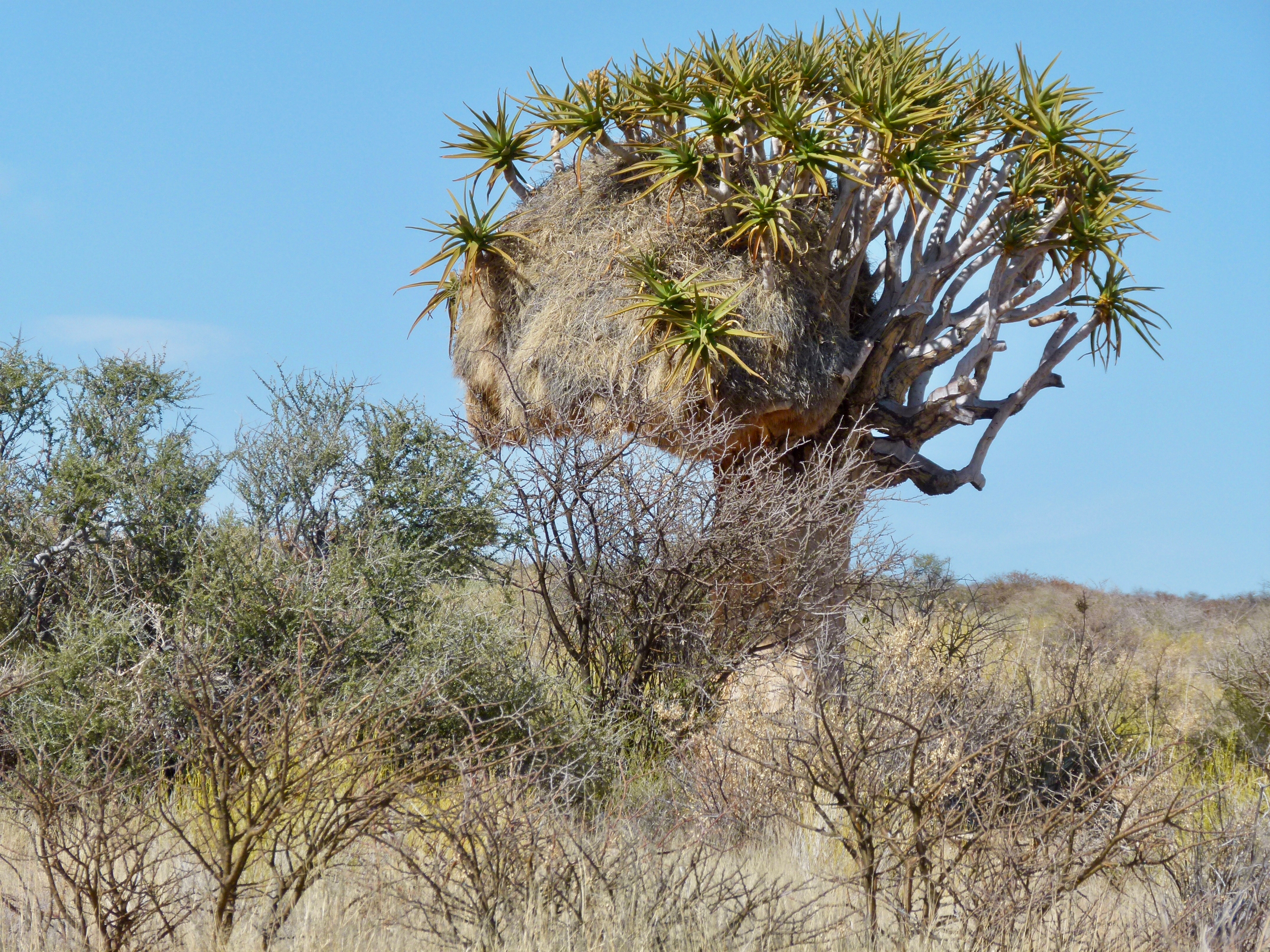
Sociable weaver nest in a Quiver Tree.

The most characteristic plant in the park is the giant tree aloe (Aloidendron dichotomum) known locally as the quiver tree or kokerboom. It is perfectly adapted to the dry semi-desert rocky areas found in the Nama-Karoo, able to withstand the extreme temperatures and the infertile soil. This tree, which grows up to five metres high, gets its name from the fact that the Bushmen (San) used the soft branches to make quivers for their arrows. The eye-catching silhouette of the quiver tree is typical of this part of Northern Cape landscape. When the tree flowers in the winter flocks of birds are attracted to their copious nectar, and baboons can be seen tearing the flowers apart to get the sweet liquor.

The Shepherd's tree, a stocky tree that grows in typically dry, open woodland and bushveld, can be found in the area. The Khoi and San communities around these areas hold this tree in deep reverence; its destruction is strictly forbidden. This tree also grows in part of the Free State province.

There is an array of animal species on the 28 000 hectares of the Augrabies National Park. Game such as springbok, gemsbok and the endangered south-central black rhinoceros can be found here. Rare animals such as the Cape clawless otter can be spotted in the area, alongside the black-backed jackal, caracal, the bat-eared fox and the African wildcat.

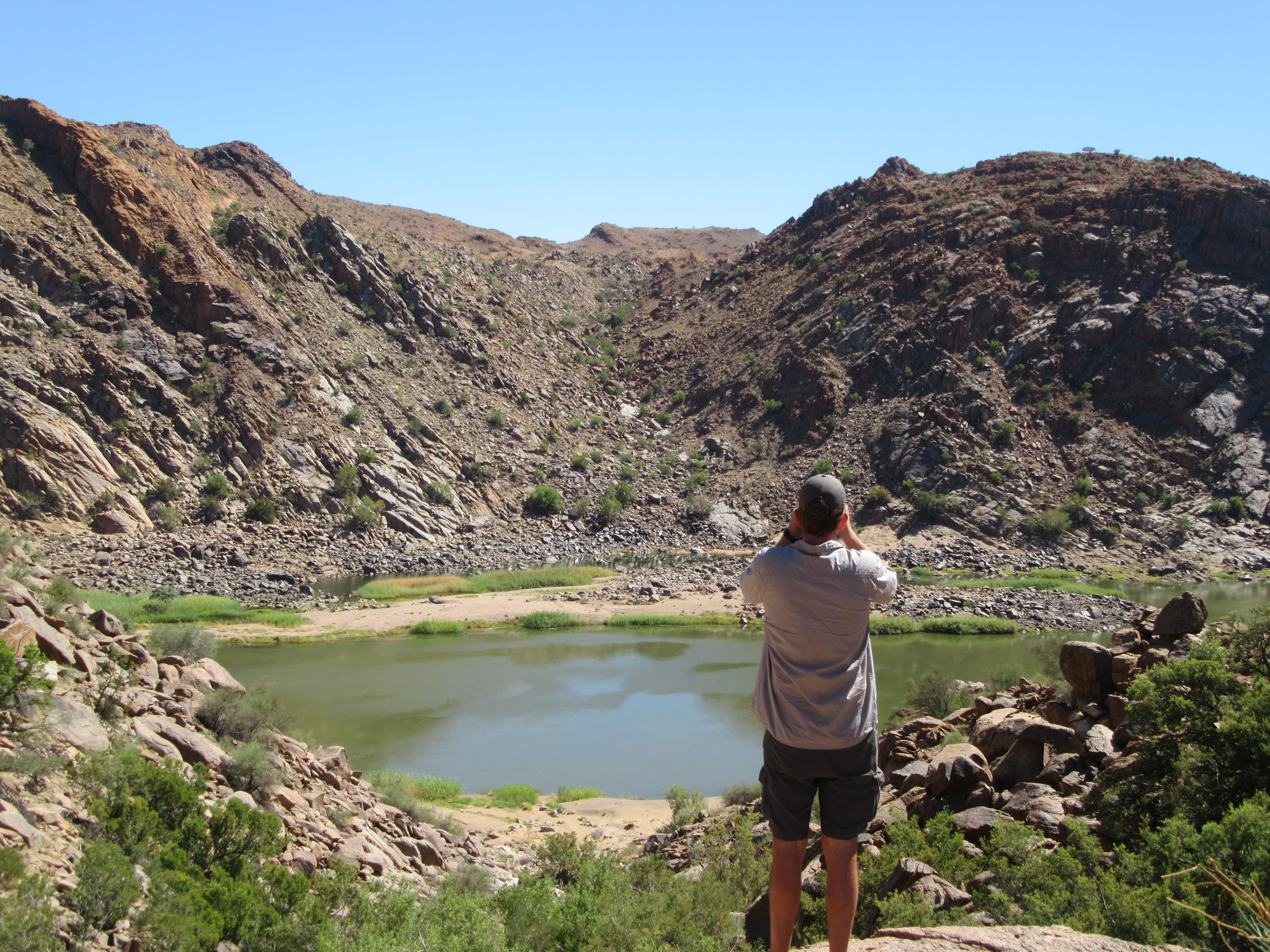
Echo Corner viewpoint contains an abundance of wildlife.

The Nile monitor, Africa's largest lizard, can be found along the water. The Double-banded sandgrouse can be found here, alongside the more commonly spotted Namaqua sandgrouse.

These are found in freshwater systems, lagoons, and the sea so long as fresh drinking water is available. A prominent landmark in the park is Moon Rock, a large exfoliation dome measuring around 700 metres (2,300 ft) by 100 metres (330 ft) and 30 metres (98 ft) high.

== Activities ==
Apart from the Augrabies Falls, key activities in the park include night drives during peak season; the Dassie trail and the Klipspringer 3 day trail hike. The Augrabies National Park is approximately an 8 hours drive from Cape Town, and 10 hours from Johannesburg.

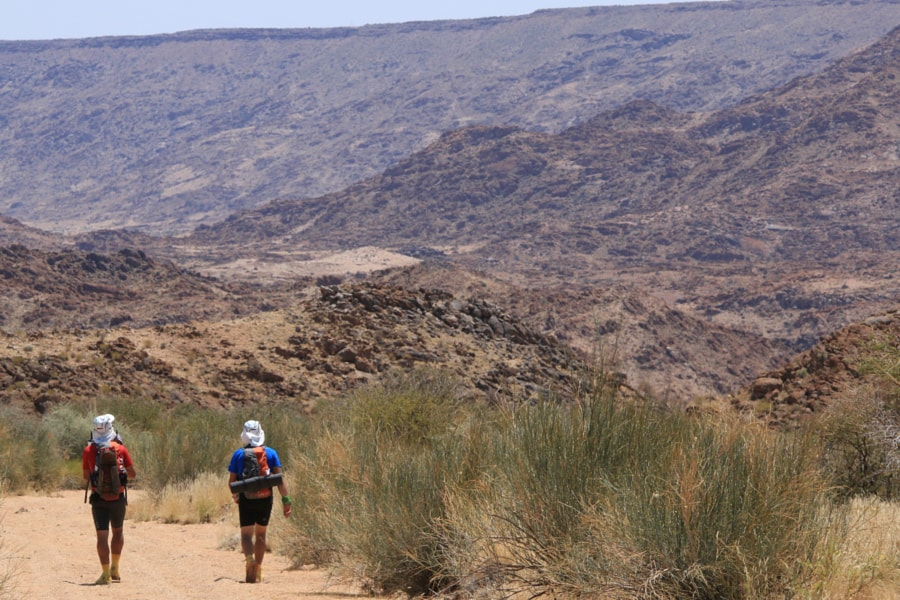
Two men walk in the arid Augrabies Falls National Park, near the border between South Africa and Namibia

=== Trails ===
There are two hiking trails, both are self-guided and have waymark signs.

==== Dassie Trail ====
The Dassie Trail is 5 km (3.1 mi) in length.

==== Klipspringer Trail ====
The 3-day Klipspringer Trail is 14.4 km (8.9 mi) in length.

== Weather ==
Rainy season occurs mainly between the months of January to April.

== See also ==
- Broadley's flat lizard
- South African National Parks
- Yosemite National Park
