= Augrabies Falls =

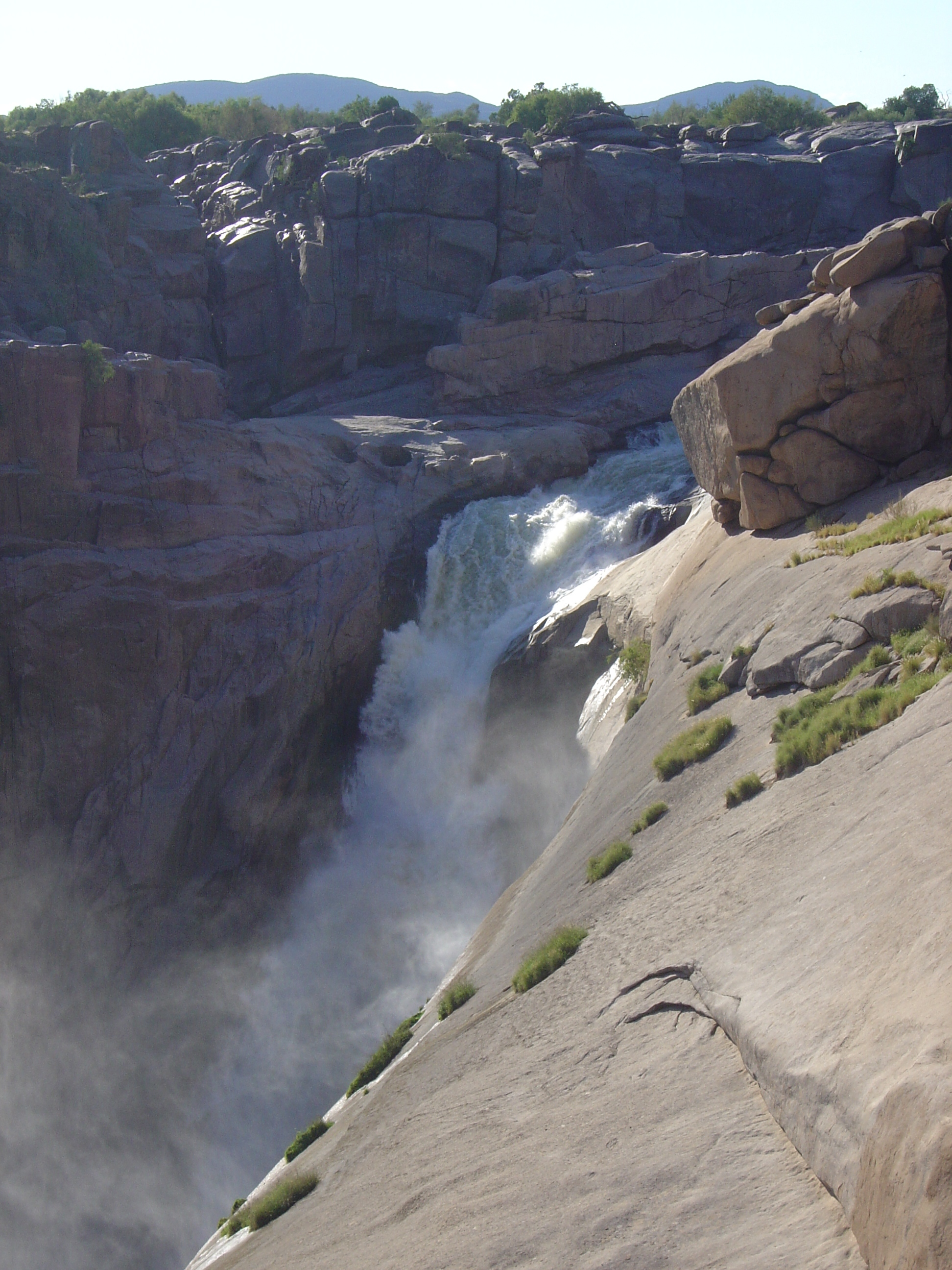
- Augrabies Falls

- Location within South Africa
- Location: Kai ǃGarib Local Municipality, Northern Cape, South Africa
- Coordinates: 28°35′29″S 20°20′27″E
- Type: Cascade
- Total height: 56 metres (183 ft)
- Average width: 24 metres (80 ft)
- Watercourse: Orange River
- Average flow rate: 313 cubic metres (11,050 ft^{3})

The Augrabies Falls /ɔːˈxrɑːbiːz/ is a waterfall on the Orange River, the largest river in South Africa. Since 1966 the waterfall, set in a desolate and rugged milieu, is enclosed by the Augrabies Falls National Park. The falls are around 56 metres (184 ft) in height. Some sources cite an approximate height of 146 metres (479 ft); this is actually the height from the base of the canyon to the top of the walls, not that of the falls themselves.

== Exploration ==
The original Khoikhoi residents named the waterfall "Ankoerebis" — "place of great noise" — from which the Trek Boers, who settled here later on, derived the name, "Augrabies". The last leader of area's native residents was Klaas Pofadder who lived on an island upstream of the falls, now known as Klaas Island. The first European to see the falls was the renegade Swedish mercenary Hendrik Jakob Wikar. He arrived at the falls in October 1778, after years long wanderings in the wilderness. When another traveler, George Thompson, was led to the falls by his Koranna guides in 1826, he named it after King George IV.

In the early 1920s the soldier, adventurer and statesman Deneys Reitz swam up the plunge pool and into the cavern behind the falls, laying a claim to have been the first person to do so and live.

== Size ==
The Augrabies Falls have recorded 7,800 cubic metres (280,000 cu ft) of water every second in floods in 1988 (and 6,800 cubic metres (240,000 cu ft) in the floods of 2006). This is over three times the average high season flow rate of Niagara Falls of 2,400 cubic metres (85,000 cu ft) per second, more than four times Niagara's annual average, and greater than Niagara's all-time record of 6,800 cubic metres (240,000 cu ft) per second. The gorge at the Augrabies Falls is 240 metres (800 ft) deep and 18 kilometres (10 mi) long, and is an impressive example of granite erosion.

== Dangers ==
Since 1966, more than 20 people have fallen to their death in the gorge, and five have been swept over the falls. A Scandinavian tourist however survived a fall into the gorge in 1979, as did a man who was swept over the falls in October 1981. The bodies of others were trapped in the plunge pool below and never found. Similarly, animals including cattle and hippopotamuses have been swept over the falls.

Augrabies Falls

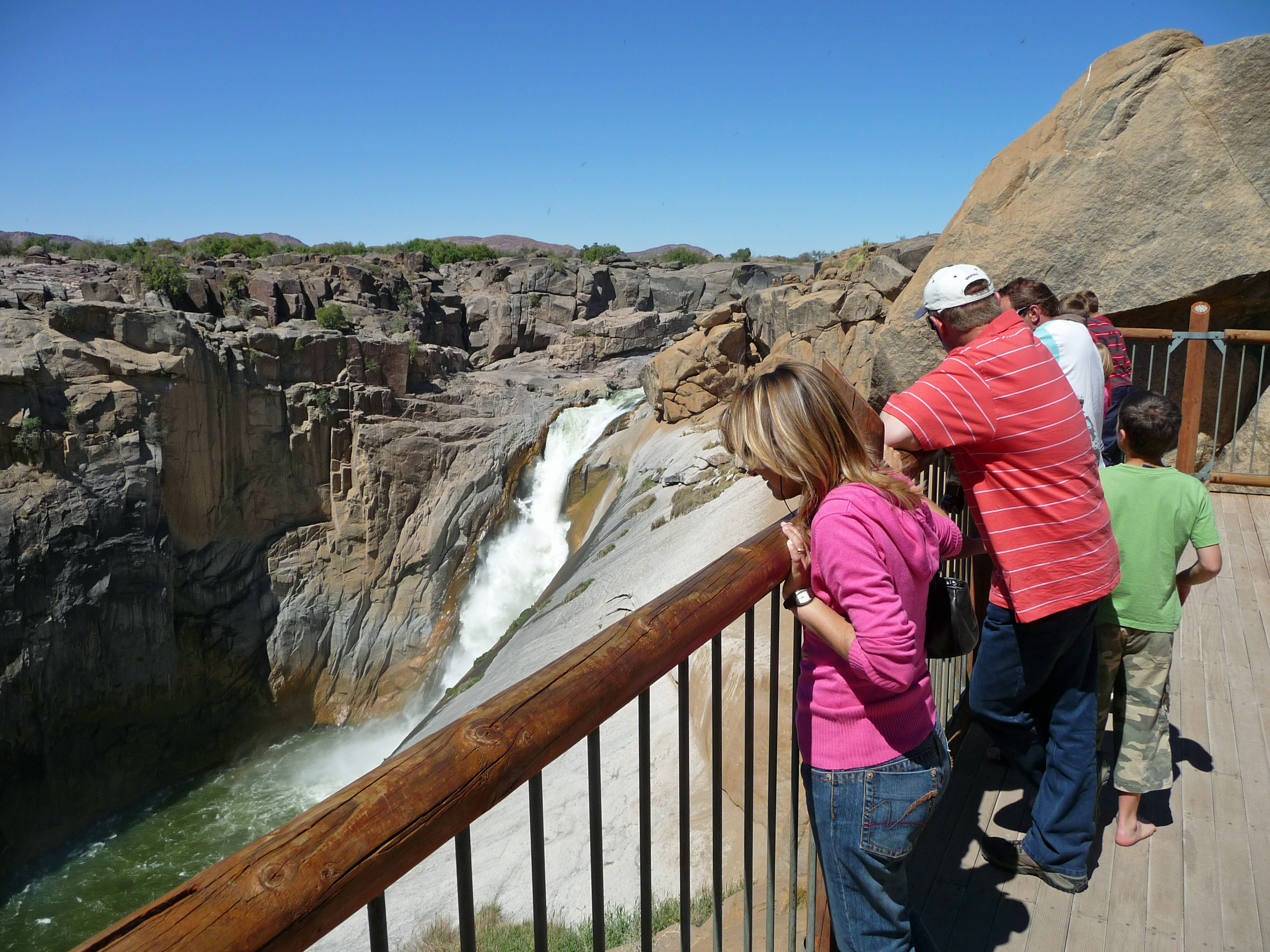
The waterfall from the viewing platform

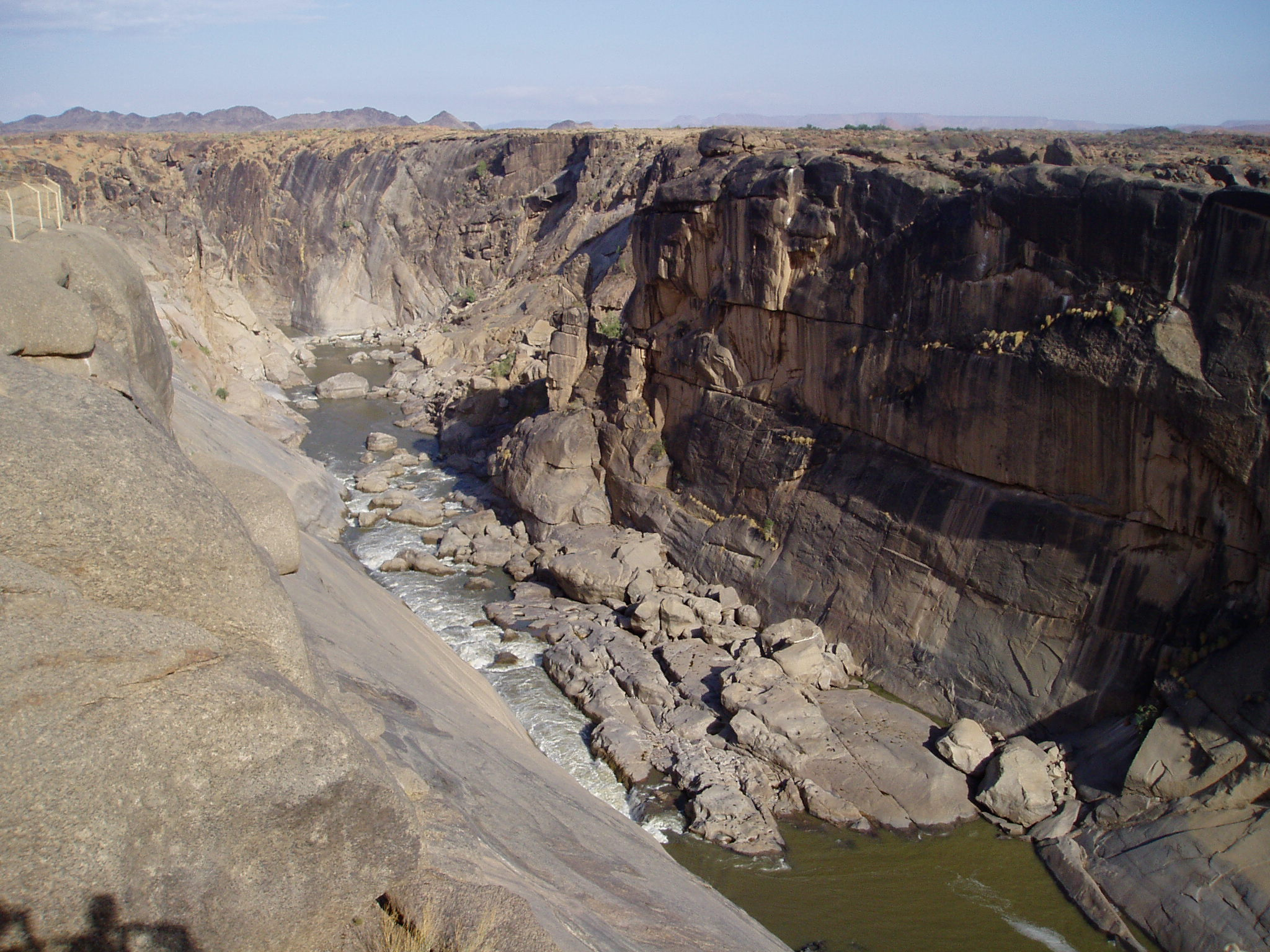
Augrabies Falls during the winter

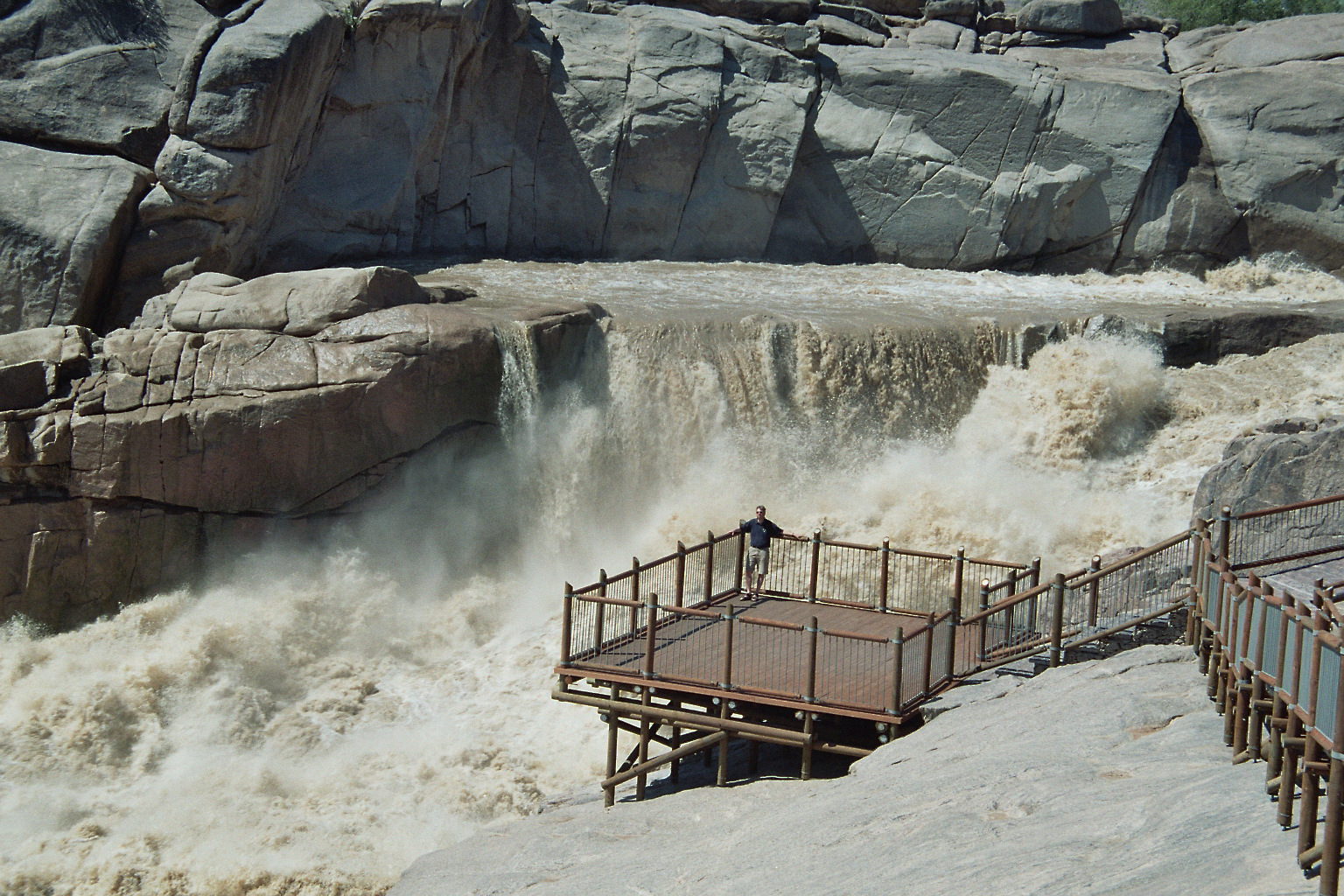
The waterfall in flood

== Folklore ==
Folklore among early twentieth-century South African prospectors describes the pool beneath the King George Cataract as being filled with diamonds, which are carried by currents down the Orange River. Additionally, the pool is also claimed to be the lair of a serpentine monster called the Grootslang.

== See also ==
- List of waterfalls
- List of waterfalls in South Africa
- List of waterfalls by flow rate
