= List of municipalities in the Northern Cape =

The Northern Cape province of South Africa is divided, for local government purposes, into five district municipalities which are in turn divided into twenty-six local municipalities.

In the following map, the district municipalities are labelled in capital letters and shaded in various different colours.

== District municipalities ==
Name	Code	Seat	Area (km^{2})	Population (2016)	Pop. density (per km^{2})
Frances Baard District Municipality	DC9	Kimberley	12,836	387,741	30.2
John Taolo Gaetsewe District Municipality	DC45	Kuruman	27,322	242,264	8.9
Namakwa District Municipality	DC6	Springbok	126,836	115,488	0.9
Pixley ka Seme District Municipality	DC7	De Aar	103,411	195,595	1.9
ZF Mgcawu District Municipality	DC8	Upington	102,484	252,692	2.5

== Local municipalities ==
Name	Code	District	Seat	Area (km^{2})	Population (2016)	Pop. density (per km^{2})
!Kheis Local Municipality	NC084	ZF Mgcawu	Groblershoop	11,107	16,566	1.5
Dawid Kruiper Local Municipality	NC087	ZF Mgcawu	Upington	44,231	107,161	2.4
Dikgatlong Local Municipality	NC092	Frances Baard	Barkly West	7,316	48,473	6.6
Emthanjeni Local Municipality	NC073	Pixley ka Seme	De Aar	13,472	45,404	3.4
Ga-Segonyana Local Municipality	NC452	John Taolo Gaetsewe	Kuruman	4,495	104,408	23.2
Gamagara Local Municipality	NC453	John Taolo Gaetsewe	Kathu	2,648	53,656	20.3
Hantam Local Municipality	NC065	Namakwa	Calvinia	39,085	21,540	0.6
Joe Morolong Local Municipality	NC451	John Taolo Gaetsewe	Mothibistad	20,180	84,201	4.2
Kai !Garib Local Municipality	NC082	ZF Mgcawu	Kakamas	26,377	68,929	2.6
Kamiesberg Local Municipality	NC064	Namakwa	Garies	14,208	9,605	0.7
Kareeberg Local Municipality	NC074	Pixley ka Seme	Carnarvon	17,701	12,772	0.7
Karoo Hoogland Local Municipality	NC066	Namakwa	Williston	30,230	13,009	0.4
Kgatelopele Local Municipality	NC086	ZF Mgcawu	Daniëlskuil	2,478	20,691	8.3
Khâi-Ma Local Municipality	NC067	Namakwa	Pofadder	15,715	12,333	0.8
Magareng Local Municipality	NC093	Frances Baard	Warrenton	1,546	24,059	15.6
Nama Khoi Local Municipality	NC062	Namakwa	Springbok	17,990	46,512	2.6
Phokwane Local Municipality	NC094	Frances Baard	Hartswater	828	60,168	72.7
Renosterberg Local Municipality	NC075	Pixley ka Seme	Petrusville	5,529	11,818	2.1
Richtersveld Local Municipality	NC061	Namakwa	Port Nolloth	9,608	12,487	1.3
Siyancuma Local Municipality	NC078	Pixley ka Seme	Douglas	16,753	35,941	2.1
Siyathemba Local Municipality	NC077	Pixley ka Seme	Prieska	14,727	23,075	1.6
Sol Plaatje Local Municipality	NC091	Frances Baard	Kimberley	3,145	255,041	81.1
Thembelihle Local Municipality	NC076	Pixley ka Seme	Hopetown	8,023	16,230	2.0
Tsantsabane Local Municipality	NC085	ZF Mgcawu	Postmasburg	18,290	39,345	2.2
Ubuntu Local Municipality	NC071	Pixley ka Seme	Victoria West	20,393	19,471	1.0
Umsobomvu Local Municipality	NC072	Pixley ka Seme	Colesberg	6,813	30,883	4.5

== Former municipalities ==
These municipalities have been dissolved since the current system of local government was established in 2000.

Name	Code	Dissolved	Fate
Mier Local Municipality	NC081	3 August 2016	Merged to create Dawid Kruiper Local Municipality
//Khara Hais Local Municipality	NC083	3 August 2016	Merged to create Dawid Kruiper Local Municipality
