= List of crossings of the Orange River =

This is a list of bridges and other crossings of the Orange River. Locations are listed with the left bank (moving downriver) listed first.

In Lesotho, the river is labeled as senqu in OpenStreetMap and as the Orange River in Google Maps.

== Crossings ==
Crossing	Carries	Location	Coordinates
=== Lesotho ===
[icon]
TBC	A2	Mafeteng and Quthing	30.375465°S 27.567354°E
Seaka Bridge	B28	Mohale's Hoek and Quthing	30.364706°S 27.575421°E
Senqu Bridge	C281	Mount Moorosi	30.239447°S 27.873731°E
Pitsaneng	A5	Mohale's Hoek and Quthing	30.026495°S 28.231229°E
TBC	Local Road	Mohale's Hoek and Quthing	30.025570°S 28.236462°E
TBC	D4011	Qacha's Nek District	30.056856°S 28.473526°E
TBC	D4013	Qacha's Nek District	30.052755°S 28.609175°E
TBC	A3 (another one nearby)	Mohlanapeng	29.594406°S 28.712415°E
Polihali Dam		Mokhotlong District	29.295686°S 28.856717°E
TBC		Mokhotlong District	29.289040°S 28.874082°E
TBC	A1	Sekokong	29.290278°S 28.989460°E
TBC		Numolani	29.060943°S 29.055547°E
=== Eastern Cape – Free State boundary, South Africa ===
Majaphuthi Bridge	R726	Walaza	30.4055°S 27.3381°E
General Hertzog Bridge	N6	Aliwal North	30.6856°S 26.7053°E
Frere Bridge	Dreunberg–Sannaspos railway line	Aliwal North	30.6877°S 26.6971°E
Hennie Steyn Bridge	Cape Eastern main line railway and R390	Bethulie	30.5314°S 26.0234°E
Gariep Dam	Local road	Oranjekrag	30.6233°S 25.5068°E
Gariep Bridge	R701	Oranjekrag	30.6260°S 25.5008°E
=== Northern Cape – Free State boundary, South Africa ===
Norvalspont Road Bridge	Local road	Norvalspont	30.6212°S 25.4648°E
Norvalspont Railway Bridge	Free State main line railway	Norvalspont	30.6211°S 25.4646°E
N1 Orange River Bridge	N1		30.5849°S 25.4195°E
JJ Serfontein Bridge	R717		30.5033°S 25.2007°E
Vanderkloof Dam	Local road	Vanderkloof	29.9914°S 24.7318°E
Vanderkloof Bridge	Local road	Vanderkloof	29.9918°S 24.7241°E
Havenga Bridge	R48		29.9107°S 24.6363°E
Fluitjieskraal Bridge	Local road	Orania	29.7897°S 24.4106°E
=== Northern Cape, South Africa ===
Orange River Station Bridge	Cape main line railway	Orange River Station	29.6467°S 24.2030°E
Hopetown Bridge	N12	Hopetown	29.5991°S 24.1105°E
Old Wagon Bridge	Local road	near Hopetown	29.5711°S 24.0729°E
Marksdrift Bridge	R357	near Douglas	29.1618°S 23.6936°E
Frans Loots Bridge	R386	Prieska	29.6565°S 22.7458°E
Riley Bridge	R383	Westerberg and Koegas	29.3148°S 22.3456°E
Groblershoop Bridge	N8	Groblershoop	28.8792°S 21.9872°E
Sishen–Saldanha Railway Bridge	Sishen–Saldanha railway line	near Wegdraai	28.7876°S 21.8815°E
Grootdrink Bridge	Local road	Grootdrink	28.5636°S 21.7647°E
Upington Railway Bridge	De Aar–Karasburg railway line	Upington	28.4549°S 21.2597°E
Old Upington Bridge	Footpath	Upington	28.4649°S 21.2432°E
Upington Bridge	N10	Upington	28.4651°S 21.2429°E
Eendrag Bridge and Manie Conradie Bridge	Local road	Kanoneiland	28.6479°S 21.1018°E and 28.6361°S 21.0902°E
Keimoes Bridge	R27	Keimoes	28.7286°S 20.9854°E
Kakamas Bridge	N14	Kakamas and Lutzburg	28.7557°S 20.6223°E
Kakamas Railway Bridge	Kakamas branch line railway	Kakamas and Lutzburg	28.7554°S 20.6205°E
Blouputs Bridge	Local road	Blouputs and Riemvasmaak	28.5134°S 20.1855°E
=== South Africa – Namibia border ===
Johan Conradie Bridge	R358 / C10	Onseepkans and Velloorsdrift	28.7352°S 19.3054°E
DF Malan Bridge	N7 / B1	Vioolsdrif and Noordoewer	28.7655°S 17.6263°E
Octha Ferry	Light vehicles (pontoon ferry)	Sendelingsdrif (ǀAi-ǀAis/Richtersveld Transfrontier Park)	28.1227°S 16.8898°E
Sir Ernest Oppenheimer Bridge	Local road	Alexander Bay and Oranjemund	28.5636°S 16.5028°E
