= Noenieput =

- Location within Northern Cape Location within South Africa
- Coordinates: 27°30′40″S 20°08′19″E
- Country: South Africa
- Province: Northern Cape
- District: ZF Mgcawu
- Municipality: Dawid Kruiper
- Time zone: UTC+2 (SAST)
- PO box: 8813

Noenieput is a small town in the Kalahari Desert in ZF Mgcawu District Municipality in the Northern Cape province of South Africa.

The town is located approximately 14 kilometres east of the South African border with Namibia. A police station is located in the town.
