= Hannes Combrinck =

South African politician (1971–2020)

Member of the National Assembly
- In office 23 April 2004 – May 2009

Personal details
- Born: Johannes Jacobus Combrinck; 7 April 1971 Karos, Cape Province; South Africa
- Died: 25 July 2020 (aged 49) Karos, Northern Cape
- Party: African National Congress
- Other political affiliations: New National Party (1997–98); National Party (until 1997)

Johannes Jacobus "Hannes" Combrinck (7 April 1971 – 25 July 2020) was a South African politician, civil servant and farmer who represented the Northern Cape in the National Assembly from 2004 to 2009. He represented the African National Congress (ANC), which he joined in 1998 after becoming disillusioned with the National Party. He later served as Speaker of Dawid Kruiper Local Municipality from 2009 to 2011 and was still working in municipal administration in the Northern Cape when he died in 2020.

== Early life and career ==
Combrinck was born on 7 April 1971 and was an Afrikaner from Karos on the banks of the Orange River in the former Cape Province. After matriculating, he completed mandatory military service with the South African Defence Force and then started work in Upington, where he became involved in politics through the youth council of the National Party (NP), which governed South Africa during apartheid. He later said that his military service had made him question the apartheid system, given that the government spent money not on the poor people of the Cape but "on a war. And for what?"

Combrinck later became a farmer in Karos, harvesting 60 hectares of grapes, cotton, and maize. The NP was restyled as the New National Party (NNP) in 1997, during the post-apartheid transition, and Combrinck was chairperson of its youth council branch in Gordonia in July 1998 when he defected to join the African National Congress (ANC) Youth League. He said that he was frustrated that the NNP "still spoke of 'the blacks' and 'the coloureds', they didn't talk of us all working together". He worked his way up the ranks of the ANC to join the regional executive of the party's Siyanda region in 2003.

== Parliament: 2004–2009 ==
In the 2004 general election, Combrinck, then aged 33, was elected to represent the Northern Cape constituency in the National Assembly, ranked first on the ANC's provincial party list. He served a full term in the seat, leaving after the next general election in 2009.

== Local government: 2009–2020 ==
After leaving Parliament, Combrinck represented the ANC as a local councillor in the Dawid Kruiper Local Municipality, where he served as Speaker from 2009 to 2011. In October 2011, he was appointed as a manager in the mayor's office in ZF Mgcawu District Municipality in Sibanda, where he worked at the time of his death in 2020.

== Death ==
Combrinck died on 25 July 2020 at home in Karos, aged 49 from COVID-19.
