= //Khara Hais Local Municipality =

//Khara Hais
- Local municipality
- Seal

- Location in the Northern Cape
- Coordinates: 27°40′S 21°20′E
- Country: South Africa
- Province: Northern Cape
- District: ZF Mgcawu
- Seat: Upington
- Wards: 14

Government
  - Type: Municipal council
  - Mayor: Limakhotso Koloi (ANC)

Area
  - Total: 21,780 km^{2} (8,410 sq mi)

Population (2011)
  - Total: 93,494
  - Density: 4.293/km^{2} (11.12/sq mi)

Racial makeup (2011)
  - Black African: 23.1%
  - Coloured: 65.2%
  - Indian/Asian: 0.7%
  - White: 9.9%

First languages (2011)
  - Afrikaans: 86.5%
  - Xhosa: 5.1%
  - Tswana: 3.6%
  - English: 1.9%
  - Other: 2.9%
- Time zone: UTC+2 (SAST)
- Municipal code: NC083

//Khara Hais Local Municipality was a local municipality in the Northern Cape province of South Africa. It fell within the ZF Mgcawu District Municipality and governed the town of Upington and surrounding rural areas. As of 2011 the municipality had a population of approximately 93,500 people, and covered an area of 21,780 square kilometres (8,410 sq mi). The unusual spelling of the name comes from the original transcription of the Khwe language name, where the click consonant became "//".

After municipal elections on 3 August 2016 it was merged with the Mier Local Municipality to form the Dawid Kruiper Local Municipality.

== Geography ==
The municipality area covered 21,780 square kilometres (8,410 sq mi) and stretched from the Orange River valley northwards to the international border with Botswana. Irrigation from the Orange River has produced a narrow band of irrigated land along the valley, while the rest of the municipality is desert, being the southernmost extent of the Kalahari. The Molopo and Kuruman Rivers flow intermittently through this desert area.

According to the 2011 census the municipality had a population of 93,494 people in 23,245 households. 65.2% of these people describe themselves as "Coloured", 23.1% as "Black African", and 9.9% as "White". 86.5% of the population speaks Afrikaans as their first language, 5.1% speak Xhosa, 3.6% speak Tswana and 1.9% speak English.

Most of the residents of the municipality live in the town of Upington, which has a population of 74,834. There are several smaller agricultural villages in the Orange River valley; they include (from east to west) Lamprechtsdrif (pop. 817), Karos (pop. 1,249), Leerkrans (pop. 1,383), Straussburg (pop. 1,157), Swartkop (pop. 1,652), Louisvale (pop. 4,435) and Klippunt (pop. 3,473).

== Politics ==
The municipal council consisted of twenty-seven members elected by mixed-member proportional representation. Fourteen councillors were elected by first-past-the-post voting in fourteen wards, while the remaining thirteen were chosen from party lists so that the total number of party representatives was proportional to the number of votes received. In the election of 18 May 2011 the African National Congress (ANC) won a majority of sixteen seats on the council. The following table shows the results of the election.

Party	Votes				Seats		
Party	Ward	List	Total	%	Ward	List	Total
ANC	19,036	19,339	38,375	60.5	12	4	16
DA	7,752	7,756	15,508	24.4	2	5	7
COPE	4,510	4,405	8,915	14.0	0	4	4
VF+	224	249	473	0.7	0	0	0
Independent	186	–	186	0.3	0	–	0
Total	31,708	31,749	63,457	100.0	14	13	27
Spoilt votes	384	346	730				

== Wine industry ==
Most of Upington's wines are produced by Orange River Wine Cellars (OWC). The company has six depots in the area (all of them on the banks of the Orange River) at Upington, Kanoneiland, Grootdrink, Kakamas, Keimoes and Groblershoop. The wines from OWC are exported, inter alia, to Europe and the USA. A number of privately owned cellars also exist in the area. The //Khara Hais region accounts for more or less 40% of South Africa's grape exports.
