= ǃKheis Local Municipality elections =

South African local elections

The !Kheis Local Municipality council consists of eleven members elected by mixed-member proportional representation. Six councillors are elected by first-past-the-post voting in six wards, while the remaining five are chosen from party lists so that the total number of party representatives is proportional to the number of votes received. In the election of 1 November 2021 the African National Congress (ANC) lost its majority, but remained the largest party with five seats.

== Results ==
The following table shows the composition of the council after past elections.

Event	ANC	COPE	DA	Other	Total
2000 election	4	—	3	0	7
2006 election	5	—	1	1	7
2011 election	4	2	1	0	7
2016 election	4	2	1	0	7
2021 election	5	1	2	3	11

== December 2000 election ==
The following table shows the results of the 2000 election.

Party	Ward			List			Total seats
Party	Votes	%	Seats	Votes	%	Seats	Total seats
African National Congress	2,481	59.55	4	2,495	59.89	0	4
Democratic Alliance	1,548	37.16	0	1,507	36.17	3	3
African Christian Democratic Party	137	3.29	0	164	3.94	0	0
Total	4,166	100.00	4	4,166	100.00	3	7
Valid votes	4,166	98.37		4,166	98.14		
Invalid/blank votes	69	1.63		79	1.86		
Total votes	4,235	100.00		4,245	100.00		
Registered voters/turnout	5,986	70.75		5,986	70.92		

== March 2006 election ==
The following table shows the results of the 2006 election.

Party	Ward			List			Total seats
Party	Votes	%	Seats	Votes	%	Seats	Total seats
African National Congress	3,101	70.03	4	3,069	69.58	1	5
Independent Democrats	791	17.86	0	790	17.91	1	1
Democratic Alliance	377	8.51	0	372	8.43	1	1
Freedom Front Plus	121	2.73	0	146	3.31	0	0
African Christian Democratic Party	38	0.86	0	34	0.77	0	0
Total	4,428	100.00	4	4,411	100.00	3	7
Valid votes	4,428	98.86		4,411	98.48		
Invalid/blank votes	51	1.14		68	1.52		
Total votes	4,479	100.00		4,479	100.00		
Registered voters/turnout	7,719	58.03		7,719	58.03		

== May 2011 election ==
The following table shows the results of the 2011 election.

Party	Ward			List			Total seats
Party	Votes	%	Seats	Votes	%	Seats	Total seats
African National Congress	3,502	57.14	4	3,535	57.66	0	4
Congress of the People	1,454	23.72	0	1,454	23.72	2	2
Democratic Alliance	1,067	17.41	0	1,051	17.14	1	1
Freedom Front Plus	70	1.14	0	47	0.77	0	0
African Christian Democratic Party	36	0.59	0	44	0.72	0	0
Total	6,129	100.00	4	6,131	100.00	3	7
Valid votes	6,129	99.08		6,131	99.01		
Invalid/blank votes	57	0.92		61	0.99		
Total votes	6,186	100.00		6,192	100.00		
Registered voters/turnout	8,672	71.33		8,672	71.40		

== August 2016 election ==
The following table shows the results of the 2016 election.

Party	Ward			List			Total seats
Party	Votes	%	Seats	Votes	%	Seats	Total seats
African National Congress	4,143	57.30	4	4,160	57.15	0	4
Congress of the People	1,523	21.07	0	2,001	27.49	2	2
Democratic Alliance	612	8.46	0	699	9.60	1	1
Independent candidates	542	7.50	0				0
Economic Freedom Fighters	250	3.46	0	255	3.50	0	0
Freedom Front Plus	89	1.23	0	102	1.40	0	0
Die Forum	66	0.91	0	62	0.85	0	0
Khoisan Revolution	3	0.04	0				0
Patriotic Alliance	2	0.03	0				0
Total	7,230	100.00	4	7,279	100.00	3	7
Valid votes	7,230	97.99		7,279	99.09		
Invalid/blank votes	148	2.01		67	0.91		
Total votes	7,378	100.00		7,346	100.00		
Registered voters/turnout	9,731	75.82		9,731	75.49		

== November 2021 election ==
The following table shows the results of the 2021 election.

Party	Ward			List			Total seats
Party	Votes	%	Seats	Votes	%	Seats	Total seats
African National Congress	3,120	44.38	3	3,273	48.58	2	5
Democratic Alliance	1,279	18.19	1	1,633	24.24	1	2
Independent candidates	1,737	24.71	2				2
Economic Freedom Fighters	420	5.97	0	517	7.67	1	1
Congress of the People	205	2.92	0	565	8.39	1	1
Khoisan Revolution	151	2.15	0	395	5.86	0	0
Freedom Front Plus	118	1.68	0	354	5.25	0	0
Total	7,030	100.00	6	6,737	100.00	5	11
Valid votes	7,030	98.57		6,737	94.59		
Invalid/blank votes	102	1.43		385	5.41		
Total votes	7,132	100.00		7,122	100.00		
Registered voters/turnout	10,075	70.79		10,075	70.69		

=== By-elections from November 2021 ===
The following by-elections were held to fill vacant ward seats in the period since the election in November 2021.

Date	Ward	Party of the previous councillor	Party of the newly elected councillor
9 Oct 2024	6	Democratic Alliance	African National Congress

Prior to the 9 October by-election, the council had a Democratic Alliance (DA) mayor, and the party governed in coalition with the two independents, the Economic Freedom Fighters (EFF) and Congress of the People (COPE). After the by-election, the ANC gained a majority and can govern the municipality on its own, and the council was reconfigured as below:

Party	Seats		
Party	Ward	List	Total
African National Congress	4	2	6
Independent candidates	2	0	2
Democratic Alliance	0	1	1
Congress of the People	0	1	1
Economic Freedom Fighters	0	1	1
Total	6	5	11
