= Lime Acres =

- Location within Northern Cape Location within South Africa
- Coordinates: 28.374°S 23.461°E
- Country: South Africa
- Province: Northern Cape
- District: ZF Mgcawu
- Municipality: Kgatelopele

Area
  - Total: 70.37 km^{2} (27.17 sq mi)

Population (2011)
  - Total: 4,408
  - Density: 62.64/km^{2} (162.2/sq mi)

Racial makeup (2011)
  - Black African: 59.4%
  - Coloured: 21.8%
  - Indian/Asian: 0.3%
  - White: 18.2%
  - Other: 0.2%

First languages (2011)
  - Tswana: 40.9%
  - Afrikaans: 40.2%
  - English: 6.1%
  - Zulu: 4.0%
  - Other: 8.8%
- Time zone: UTC+2 (SAST)
- Postal code (street): 8410
- PO box: 8410
- Area code: 053

Lime Acres is a town in Kgatelopele Local Municipality in the Northern Cape province of South Africa.

Lime Acres is a mining village, and there are rich limestone deposits in the area. It is home to both PPC Lime and Petra Diamonds, was named by Eric Lowther, general manager of Northern Lime. The Finsch diamond mine is situated 2 km from Lime Acres, and its employees live in the town.
