= Mier Local Municipality =

Mier
- Local municipality
- Seal

- Location in the Northern Cape
- Coordinates: 26°20′S 20°20′E
- Country: South Africa
- Province: Northern Cape
- District: ZF Mgcawu
- Seat: Rietfontein
- Wards: 4

Government
  - Type: Municipal council
  - Mayor: Sophia Kethrina Coetzee

Area
  - Total: 22,468 km^{2} (8,675 sq mi)

Population (2011)
  - Total: 7,003
  - Density: 0.3117/km^{2} (0.8073/sq mi)

Racial makeup (2011)
  - Black African: 4.0%
  - Coloured: 90.4%
  - Indian/Asian: 0.6%
  - White: 4.4%

First languages (2011)
  - Afrikaans: 97.0%
  - Other: 3%
- Time zone: UTC+2 (SAST)
- Municipal code: NC081

Mier was a local municipality within the ZF Mgcawu District Municipality in the Northern Cape province of South Africa. Its area includes the South African portion of one of the world's largest conservation areas, the Kgalagadi Transfrontier Park. The main settlement in the municipality is the town of Rietfontein.

According to the 2011 census Mier has a population of 7,003, which is the smallest of any municipality in South Africa. It is also the most sparsely populated municipality in the country, covering a land area of 22,468 square kilometres (8,675 sq mi) with a population density of 0.31 inhabitants per square kilometre (0.80/sq mi). Mier is the municipality in South Africa with the highest percentage of Afrikaans speakers at 97.1%.

The name Mier is an Afrikaans word that originates from the word "mere" which means "lakes". When German missionaries visited the area a long time ago, they found the pans in the area full of water. They called them "mere". As language changed, the people later pronounced it as "mier".

After municipal elections on 3 August 2016 it was merged with the //Khara Hais Local Municipality to form the Dawid Kruiper Local Municipality.

== Main places ==
The 2011 census divided the municipality into the following main places:

Place	Code	Area (km^{2})	Population
Askham	377008	3.1	0
Kalahari Gemsbok National Park	377001	9,597.7	354
Klein Mier	377005	1.0	449
Loubos	377004	1.5	641
Philandersbron	377007	1.3	1,081
Rietfontein	377006	1.8	2,293
Welkom	377003	0.5	381
Remainder	377002	12,861.5	1,803
Total		7,003	Afrikaans

Other villages and populated places in the municipality include Bokspits, Brsdring, Andriesvale and Tweerivieren.

== Politics ==
The municipal council consisted of seven members elected by mixed-member proportional representation. Four councillors were elected by first-past-the-post voting in four wards, while the remaining three were chosen from party lists so that the total number of party representatives was proportional to the number of votes received. In the election of 18 May 2011 the African National Congress (ANC) won a majority of four seats on the council. The following table shows the results of the election.

Party	Votes				Seats		
Party	Ward	List	Total	%	Ward	List	Total
ANC	1,977	1,921	3,898	52.0	3	1	4
DA	1,154	1,128	2,282	30.4	1	1	2
COPE	636	687	1,323	17.6	0	1	1
Total	3,767	3,736	7,503	100.0	4	3	7
Spoilt votes	40	61	101				
