= Philandersbron =

- Location within Northern Cape Location within South Africa
- Coordinates: 26.8095°S 20.0943°E
- Country: South Africa
- Province: Northern Cape
- District: ZF Mgcawu
- Municipality: Dawid Kruiper

Area
  - Total: 1.30 km^{2} (0.50 sq mi)

Population (2011)
  - Total: 1,081
  - Density: 832/km^{2} (2,150/sq mi)

Racial makeup (2011)
  - Black African: 3.9%
  - Coloured: 93.7%
  - Indian/Asian: 0.6%
  - White: 1.7%
  - Other: 0.1%

First languages (2011)
  - Afrikaans: 99.1%
  - Other: 0.9%
- Time zone: UTC+2 (SAST)
- Postal code (street): 8811

Philandersbron is a town in the Dawid Kruiper Local Municipality within the ZF Mgcawu District Municipality in the Northern Cape province of South Africa. It has a population of 1,081; 99.07% of those speak Afrikaans. The town is mostly comprised (93.80%) of Coloured people with small percentages of Black African 3.89% and White (1.67%) people. 35.1% of residents are 14 or under.

A small primary school is located in the town along with a public health clinic.
