= Gannaput =

- Location within Northern Cape Location within South Africa
- Coordinates: 28.7527°S 21.8425°E
- Country: South Africa
- Province: Northern Cape
- District: ZF Mgcawu
- Municipality: !Kheis

Area
  - Total: 2.68 km^{2} (1.03 sq mi)

Population (2011)
  - Total: 1,398
  - Density: 522/km^{2} (1,350/sq mi)

Racial makeup (2011)
  - Black African: 15.9%
  - Coloured: 80.8%
  - Indian/Asian: 1.6%
  - White: 1.7%

First languages (2011)
  - Afrikaans: 92.3%
  - Tswana: 3.0%
  - Sotho: 1.6%
  - Xhosa: 1.4%
  - Other: 1.6%
- Time zone: UTC+2 (SAST)

Gannaput is a village, lying next to the Orange River in ZF Mgcawu District Municipality in the Northern Cape province of South Africa.
