= Tsantsabane Local Municipality elections =

The Tsantsabane Local Municipality council consists of thirteen members elected by mixed-member proportional representation. Seven councillors are elected by first-past-the-post voting in seven wards, while the remaining six are chosen from party lists so that the total number of party representatives is proportional to the number of votes received. In the election of 1 November 2021 the African National Congress (ANC) won a majority of seven seats.

== Results ==
The following table shows the composition of the council after past elections.

Event	ANC	DA	EFF	STC	Other	Total
2000 election	5	2	—	—	4	11
2006 election	9	1	—	—	1	11
2011 election	6	2	—	—	3	11
2016 election	7	2	1	3	0	13
2021 election	7	2	2	2	0	13

== December 2000 election ==
The following table shows the results of the 2000 election.

Party	Ward			List			Total seats
Party	Votes	%	Seats	Votes	%	Seats	Total seats
African National Congress	3,955	45.06	3	3,965	45.55	2	5
Postmasburg-Olifantshoek Residents Association	3,089	35.19	2	3,018	34.67	2	4
Democratic Alliance	1,734	19.75	1	1,722	19.78	1	2
Total	8,778	100.00	6	8,705	100.00	5	11
Valid votes	8,778	95.71		8,705	95.43		
Invalid/blank votes	393	4.29		417	4.57		
Total votes	9,171	100.00		9,122	100.00		
Registered voters/turnout	15,725	58.32		15,725	58.01		

== March 2006 election ==
The following table shows the results of the 2006 election.

Party	Ward			List			Total seats
Party	Votes	%	Seats	Votes	%	Seats	Total seats
African National Congress	5,375	76.51	6	5,304	75.68	3	9
Independent Democrats	784	11.16	0	818	11.67	1	1
Democratic Alliance	734	10.45	0	725	10.35	1	1
African Christian Democratic Party	132	1.88	0	161	2.30	0	0
Total	7,025	100.00	6	7,008	100.00	5	11
Valid votes	7,025	97.46		7,008	97.24		
Invalid/blank votes	183	2.54		199	2.76		
Total votes	7,208	100.00		7,207	100.00		
Registered voters/turnout	13,540	53.23		13,540	53.23		

== May 2011 election ==
The following table shows the results of the 2011 election.

Party	Ward			List			Total seats
Party	Votes	%	Seats	Votes	%	Seats	Total seats
African National Congress	5,871	57.75	5	5,995	58.87	1	6
Tsantsabane Community Forum	1,598	15.72	0	1,587	15.58	2	2
Democratic Alliance	1,520	14.95	1	1,477	14.50	1	2
Congress of the People	1,152	11.33	0	1,124	11.04	1	1
Independent candidates	26	0.26	0				0
Total	10,167	100.00	6	10,183	100.00	5	11
Valid votes	10,167	98.00		10,183	98.17		
Invalid/blank votes	207	2.00		190	1.83		
Total votes	10,374	100.00		10,373	100.00		
Registered voters/turnout	16,411	63.21		16,411	63.21		

== August 2016 election ==
The following table shows the results of the 2016 election.

Party	Ward			List			Total seats
Party	Votes	%	Seats	Votes	%	Seats	Total seats
African National Congress	6,563	55.66	7	6,526	55.60	0	7
Save Tsantsabane Coalition	2,546	21.59	0	2,566	21.86	3	3
Democratic Alliance	1,934	16.40	0	1,908	16.25	2	2
Economic Freedom Fighters	517	4.38	0	522	4.45	1	1
Freedom Front Plus	232	1.97	0	216	1.84	0	0
Total	11,792	100.00	7	11,738	100.00	6	13
Valid votes	11,792	98.73		11,738	98.38		
Invalid/blank votes	152	1.27		193	1.62		
Total votes	11,944	100.00		11,931	100.00		
Registered voters/turnout	18,682	63.93		18,682	63.86		

== November 2021 election ==
The following table shows the results of the 2021 election.

Party	Ward			List			Total seats
Party	Votes	%	Seats	Votes	%	Seats	Total seats
African National Congress	4,534	50.63	7	4,478	50.21	0	7
Save Tsantsabane Coalition	1,609	17.97	0	1,817	20.37	2	2
Democratic Alliance	1,294	14.45	0	1,310	14.69	2	2
Economic Freedom Fighters	1,085	12.12	0	1,063	11.92	2	2
Freedom Front Plus	214	2.39	0	209	2.34	0	0
Independent candidates	185	2.07	0				0
African People's Convention	34	0.38	0	42	0.47	0	0
Total	8,955	100.00	7	8,919	100.00	6	13
Valid votes	8,955	97.67		8,919	97.81		
Invalid/blank votes	214	2.33		200	2.19		
Total votes	9,169	100.00		9,119	100.00		
Registered voters/turnout	18,336	50.01		18,336	49.73		
