= Kgatelopele Local Municipality elections =

South African political elections

The Kgatelopele Local Municipality council consists of eleven members elected by mixed-member proportional representation. Six councillors are elected by first-past-the-post voting in six wards, while the remaining five are chosen from party lists so that the total number of party representatives is proportional to the number of votes received. In the election of 1 November 2021 no party won a majority on the council, with the African National Congress (ANC) winning the largest number of seats, five.

== Results ==
The following table shows the composition of the council after past elections.

Event	ANC	DA	Other	Total
2000 election	5	2	1	8
2006 election	6	1	1	8
2011 election	5	2	1	8
2016 election	3	2	2	7
2021 election	5	2	4	11

== December 2000 election ==
The following table shows the results of the 2000 election.

Party	Ward			List			Total seats
Party	Votes	%	Seats	Votes	%	Seats	Total seats
African National Congress	2,473	57.77	4	2,566	60.23	1	5
Democratic Alliance	1,079	25.20	0	1,259	29.55	2	2
Azanian People's Organisation	345	8.06	0	435	10.21	1	1
Independent candidates	384	8.97	0				0
Total	4,281	100.00	4	4,260	100.00	4	8
Valid votes	4,281	95.94		4,260	95.26		
Invalid/blank votes	181	4.06		212	4.74		
Total votes	4,462	100.00		4,472	100.00		
Registered voters/turnout	8,054	55.40		8,054	55.53		

== March 2006 election ==
The following table shows the results of the 2006 election.

Party	Ward			List			Total seats
Party	Votes	%	Seats	Votes	%	Seats	Total seats
African National Congress	3,169	72.67	4	3,180	72.99	2	6
Independent Democrats	673	15.43	0	668	15.33	1	1
Democratic Alliance	419	9.61	0	400	9.18	1	1
African Christian Democratic Party	100	2.29	0	109	2.50	0	0
Total	4,361	100.00	4	4,357	100.00	4	8
Valid votes	4,361	98.20		4,357	98.09		
Invalid/blank votes	80	1.80		85	1.91		
Total votes	4,441	100.00		4,442	100.00		
Registered voters/turnout	8,642	51.39		8,642	51.40		

== May 2011 election ==
The following table shows the results of the 2011 election.

Party	Ward			List			Total seats
Party	Votes	%	Seats	Votes	%	Seats	Total seats
African National Congress	3,540	66.89	4	3,576	67.41	1	5
Democratic Alliance	1,166	22.03	0	1,163	21.92	2	2
Congress of the People	459	8.67	0	445	8.39	1	1
Azanian People's Organisation	92	1.74	0	91	1.72	0	0
African Christian Democratic Party	35	0.66	0	30	0.57	0	0
Total	5,292	100.00	4	5,305	100.00	4	8
Valid votes	5,292	98.55		5,305	98.73		
Invalid/blank votes	78	1.45		68	1.27		
Total votes	5,370	100.00		5,373	100.00		
Registered voters/turnout	8,931	60.13		8,931	60.16		

== August 2016 election ==
The following table shows the results of the 2016 election.

Party	Ward			List			Total seats
Party	Votes	%	Seats	Votes	%	Seats	Total seats
African National Congress	2,453	43.24	2	2,425	42.86	1	3
Democratic Alliance	1,588	27.99	1	1,596	28.21	1	2
Kgatelopele Community Forum	1,274	22.46	1	1,219	21.54	1	2
Economic Freedom Fighters	151	2.66	0	219	3.87	0	0
Freedom Front Plus	153	2.70	0	134	2.37	0	0
Azanian People's Organisation	41	0.72	0	31	0.55	0	0
Patriotic Alliance	13	0.23	0	34	0.60	0	0
Total	5,673	100.00	4	5,658	100.00	3	7
Valid votes	5,673	98.70		5,658	98.54		
Invalid/blank votes	75	1.30		84	1.46		
Total votes	5,748	100.00		5,742	100.00		
Registered voters/turnout	9,767	58.85		9,767	58.79		

== November 2021 election ==
The following table shows the results of the 2021 election.

Party	Ward			List			Total seats
Party	Votes	%	Seats	Votes	%	Seats	Total seats
African National Congress	1,939	42.84	5	2,006	44.54	0	5
Patriotic Alliance	810	17.90	0	858	19.05	2	2
Democratic Alliance	762	16.84	1	770	17.10	1	2
Economic Freedom Fighters	384	8.48	0	442	9.81	1	1
Freedom Front Plus	397	8.77	0	381	8.46	1	1
Independent candidates	200	4.42	0				0
Azanian People's Organisation	34	0.75	0	47	1.04	0	0
Total	4,526	100.00	6	4,504	100.00	5	11
Valid votes	4,526	98.07		4,504	97.47		
Invalid/blank votes	89	1.93		117	2.53		
Total votes	4,615	100.00		4,621	100.00		
Registered voters/turnout	9,518	48.49		9,518	48.55		
