= Kgalagadi =

Kgalagadi, meaning "Land of the thirst", is a geographical area located in Southern Africa. It may also refer to:

- Kgalagadi District, Botswana
- Kgalagadi language
- Kgalagadi people
- Kgalagadi Transfrontier Park
