= Kalahari language =

Kalahari language may refer to:

- the Bantu Kgalagadi language
- one of the Kalahari Khoe languages
