= Kalahari Desert =

Semi-arid sandy savanna in Southern Africa

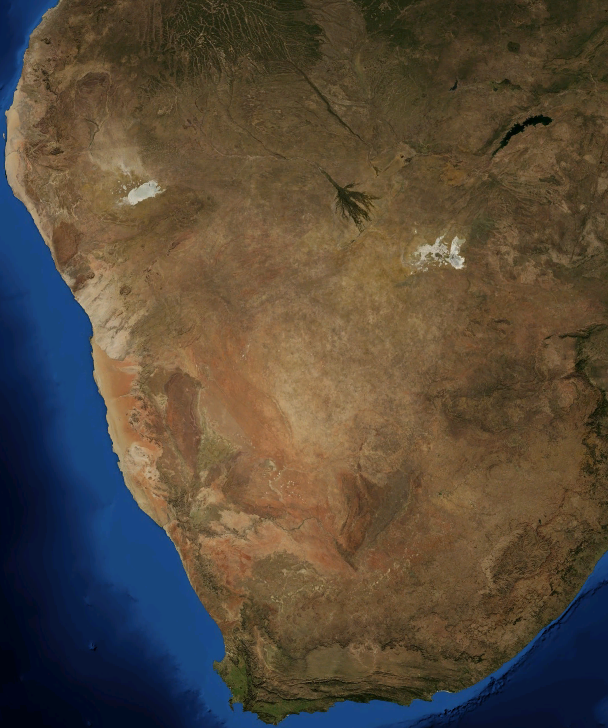
- A satellite image of the Kalahari by NASA WorldWind

- Kalahari Desert (maroon); Kalahari Basin (orange)
- Length: 4,000 km (2,500 mi)
- Area: 900,000 km^{2} (350,000 mi^{2})

Geography
- Countries: Botswana; Namibia; South Africa
- State/Province: Southern Region
- Coordinates: 23°S 22°E
- River: Orange River

The Kalahari Desert is a large semiarid sandy savanna in Southern Africa covering 900,000 km^{2} (350,000 sq mi), including much of Botswana, as well as parts of Namibia and South Africa.

== Etymology ==
Kalahari is derived from the Tswana word Kgala, meaning "the great thirst", or Kgalagadi, meaning "a waterless place"; the Kalahari has vast areas covered by red sand without any permanent surface water.

== History ==
The Kalahari Desert was not always an arid environment. Geological and paleoclimatic evidence suggests that during parts of the late Pleistocene, the region experienced significantly wetter and cooler conditions. Fossil flora and fauna from Gcwihaba Cave in northwestern Botswana indicate that the area supported more abundant vegetation and permanent water sources between roughly 30,000 and 11,000 Before Present (BP), with the most humid period occurring after 17,500 BP. Sediment cores, pollen records, and fossilized animal remains from other parts of the Kalahari, including the Makgadikgadi Pans and Okavango Basin, corroborate these findings, showing evidence of large paleolakes and river systems that once covered much of what is now desert.

During these wetter phases, the Kalahari likely supported populations of large mammals such as antelopes, elephants, and even hippopotamuses, alongside diverse plant species typical of savanna and woodland biomes. As the global climate shifted toward the Holocene around 11,000 BP, rainfall decreased and evaporation rates rose, leading to the gradual desiccation of the region and the establishment of the semi-arid ecosystem characteristic of the modern Kalahari Desert.

== Geography ==
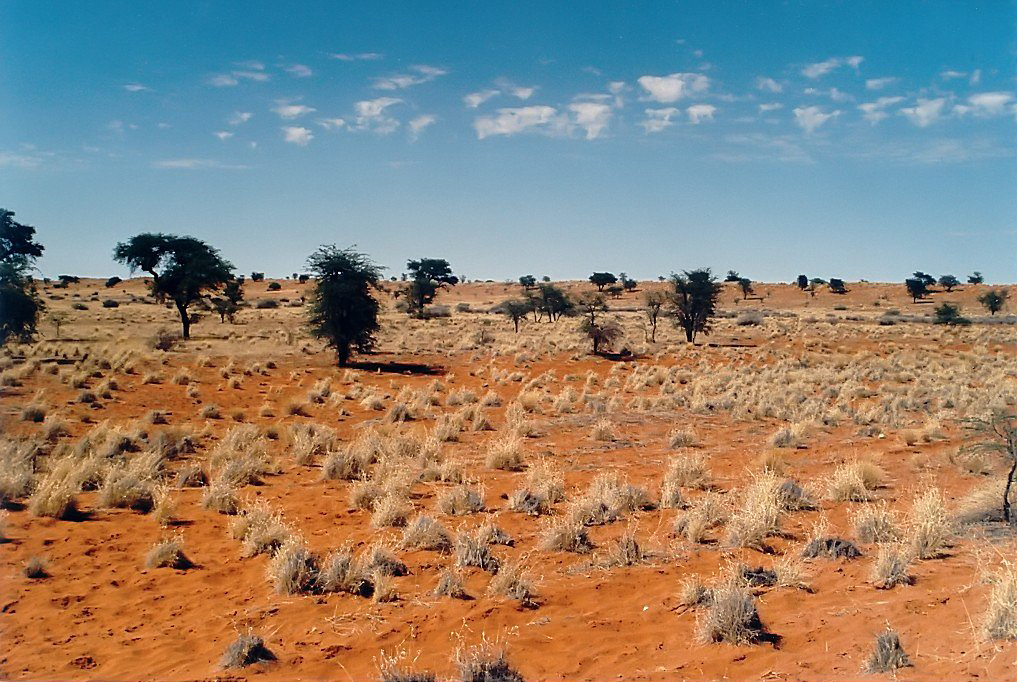
Kalahari in Namibia

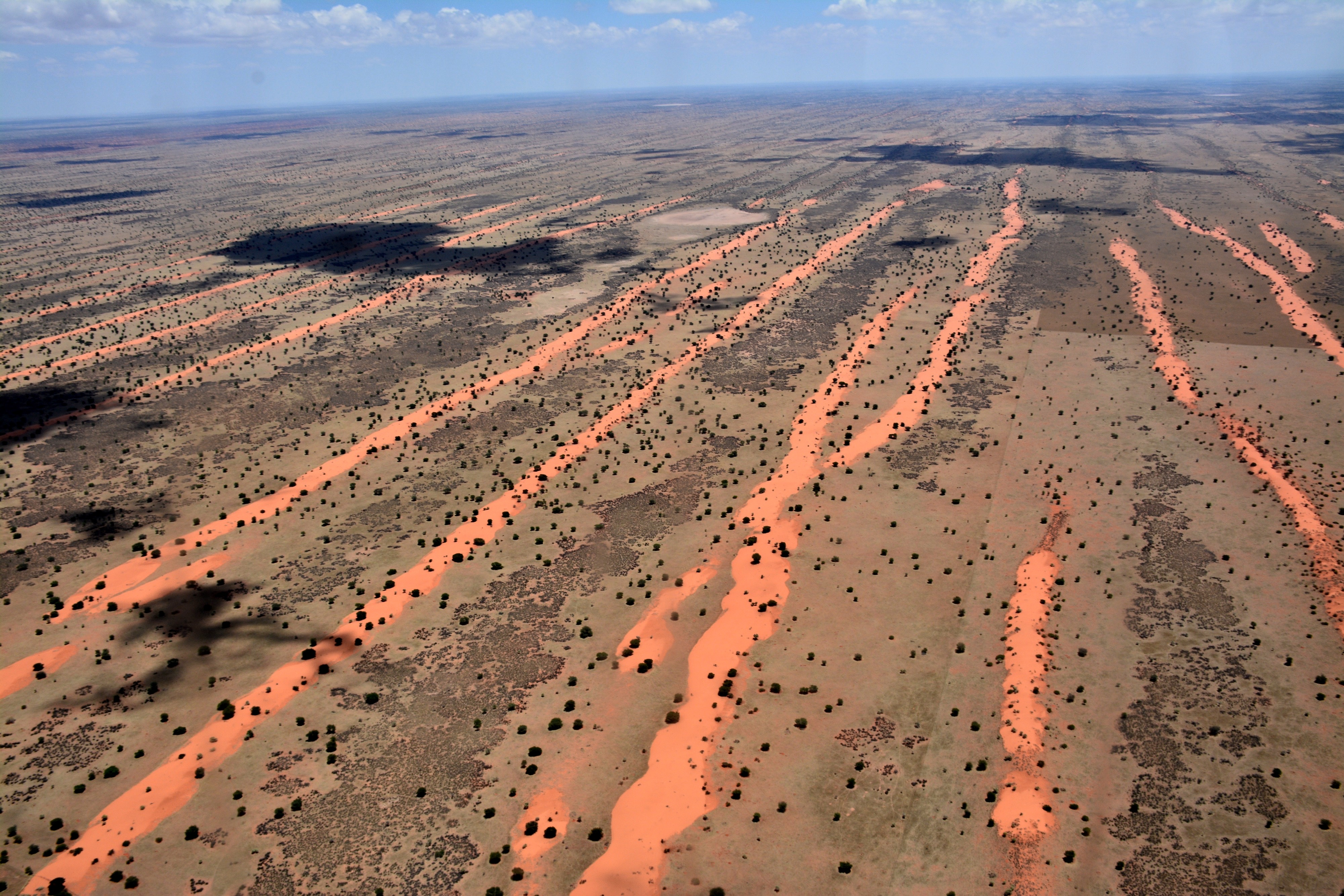
Bird's eye view of the Kalahari in Namibia: the dark dots are camel thorns

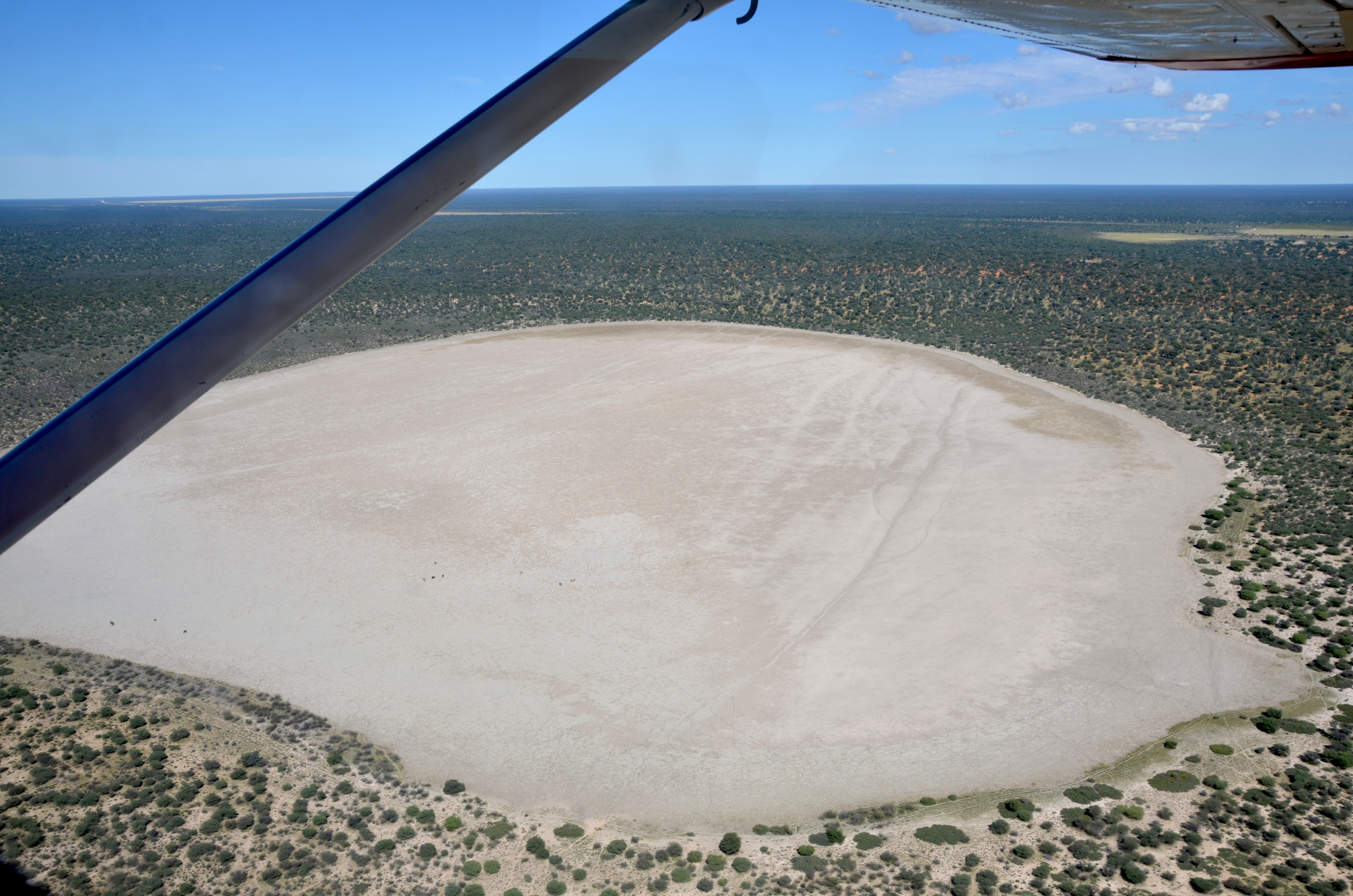
Kalahari claypan near Onderombapa

Drainage of the desert is by dry black valleys, seasonally inundated pans, and the large salt pans of the Makgadikgadi Pan in Botswana and Etosha Pan in Namibia. The only permanent river, the Okavango, flows into a delta in the northwest, forming marshes that are rich in wildlife. Ancient dry riverbeds—called Ouramba—traverse the central northern reaches of the Kalahari and provide standing pools of water during the rainy season.

A semi-desert, with huge tracts of excellent grazing after good rains, the Kalahari supports more animals and plants than a true desert, such as the Namib Desert to the west. There is little rainfall, and the summer temperature is very high. The driest areas usually receive 110–200 mm (4.3–7.9 in) of rain per year, and the wettest just a little over 500 mm (20 in). The surrounding Kalahari Basin covers over 2,500,000 km^{2} (970,000 sq mi) extending farther into Botswana, Namibia, and South Africa, encroaching into parts of Angola, Zambia and Zimbabwe.

== Climate ==
The climate is sub-humid rather than semi-arid in the north and east, where the dry forests, savannahs, and salt lakes prevail. South and west, where the vegetation is predominantly xeric savanna or even a semi-desert, the climate is "Kalaharian" semi-arid. The Kalaharian climate is subtropical: average annual temperature greater than or equal to 18 °C (64 °F), at peaks reaching 40 °C (104 °F) and above, with mean monthly temperature of the coldest month strictly below 18 °C (64 °F), and is semi-arid with the dry season from April to September, the coldest six months of the year. It is the southern tropical equivalent of the Sahelian climate with the wet season during summer. The altitude has been adduced as the explanation why the Kalaharian climate is not tropical; its altitude ranges from 600 to 1600 meters (and generally from 800 to 1200 meters), resulting in a cooler climate than that of the Sahel or Sahara. For example, winter frost is common from June to August, rarely seen in the warmer Sahelian regions. For the same reason, summer temperatures certainly can be very hot, but not in comparison to regions of low altitude in the Sahel or Sahara, where some stations record average temperatures of the warmest month around 38 °C (100 °F), whereas the average temperature of the warmest month in any region in the Kalahari never exceeds 29 °C (84 °F), though daily temperatures occasionally reach up to close to 45 °C (113 °F) (44.8 °C (112.6 °F) at Twee Rivieren Rest Camp in 2012).

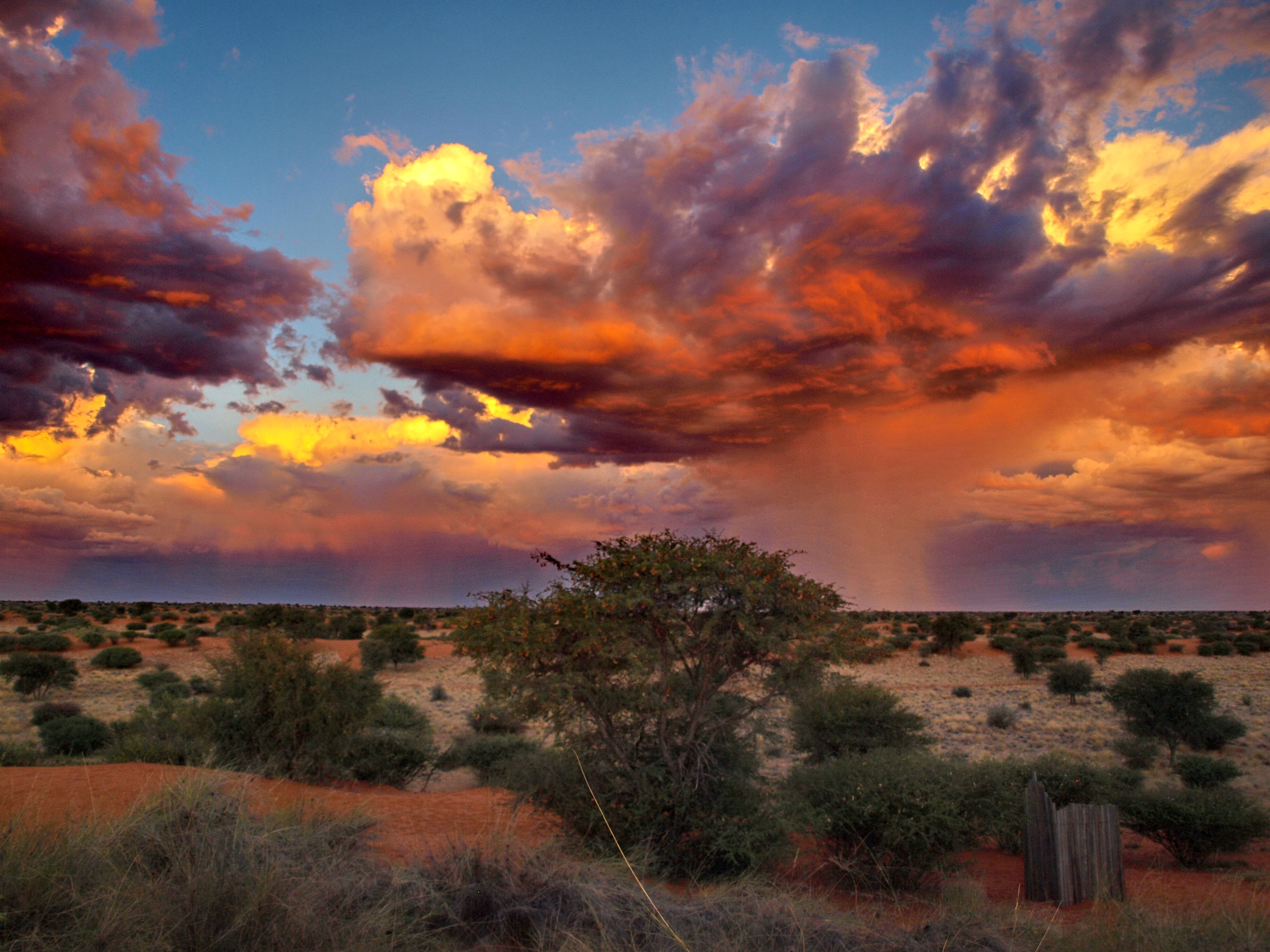
Heavy thunderstorm near Stampriet

The dry season lasts eight months or more, and the wet season typically from less than one month to four months, depending on location. The southwestern Kalahari is the driest area, particularly a small region toward the west-southwest of Tsaraxaibis (Southeast of Namibia). The average annual rainfall ranges from around 110 mm (close to aridity) to more than 500 mm in some north and east areas. During summertime in all regions, rainfall may go with heavy thunderstorms. In the driest and sunniest parts of the Kalahari, over 4,000 hours of sunshine are recorded annually on average.

In the Kalahari, there are three main mechanisms of atmospheric circulation, dominated by the Kalahari High anticyclone in winter, and by the Kalahari Heat Low in summer:

- The North and Northwest of the Kalahari are subject to the alternation "Intertropical Convergence Zone (ITCZ)/"Continental Trade winds". The ITCZ is the meeting area of the boreal trade winds with their austral counterparts what meteorologists call "Meteorological equator" and the sailors "Doldrum" or "Pot-au-noir" : the ITCZ generates rains in the wet season, whereas the continental trade winds cause the dry season;
- The rest of the Kalahari is subject to the maritime trade winds that largely shed their moisture as they cross up and over the Southern African Great Escarpment before arriving over the Kalahari.
- In the southern hemisphere summer (from December to February), a low-pressure system develops over the Kalahari, which is driven by strong surface heating (known as a Thermal Low). The low-pressure system helps to control the moisture-bearing easterly wind emanating from the Indian Ocean, thus influencing rainfall across southern Africa.

There are huge subterranean water reserves beneath parts of the Kalahari; the Dragon's Breath Cave, for example, is the largest documented non-subglacial underground lake. Such reserves may partly be the residues of ancient lakes; the Kalahari Desert was once a much wetter place. The ancient Lake Makgadikgadi dominated the area, covering the Makgadikgadi Pan and surrounding areas, but it drained or dried out some 10,000 years ago. It may have once covered as much as 120,000 square kilometres (46,000 sq mi). In ancient times, there was sufficient moisture for farming, with dikes and dams collecting the water. These are now filled with sediment, breached, or no longer in use, though they can be readily seen via Google Earth.

The Kalahari has had a complex climatic history over the past million or so years, in line with major global changes. Changes in the last 250,000 years have been reconstructed from various data sources, providing evidence of former extensive lakes and drier periods. During the latter, the area of the Kalahari has expanded to include parts of western Zimbabwe, Zambia, and Angola.

== Vegetation and flora ==
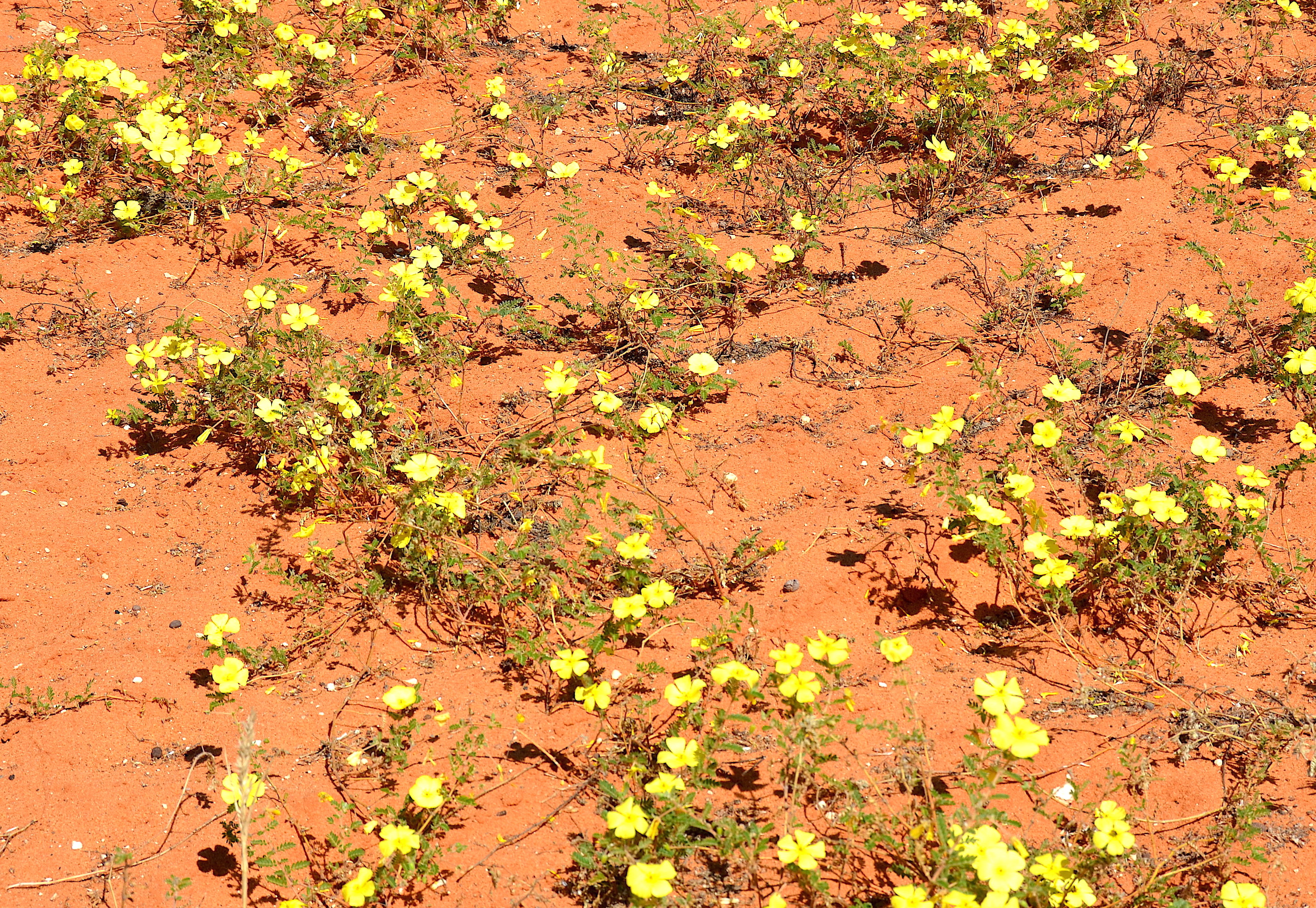
Devil's thorn flower (Tribulus zeyheri) growing in the Kalahari Desert

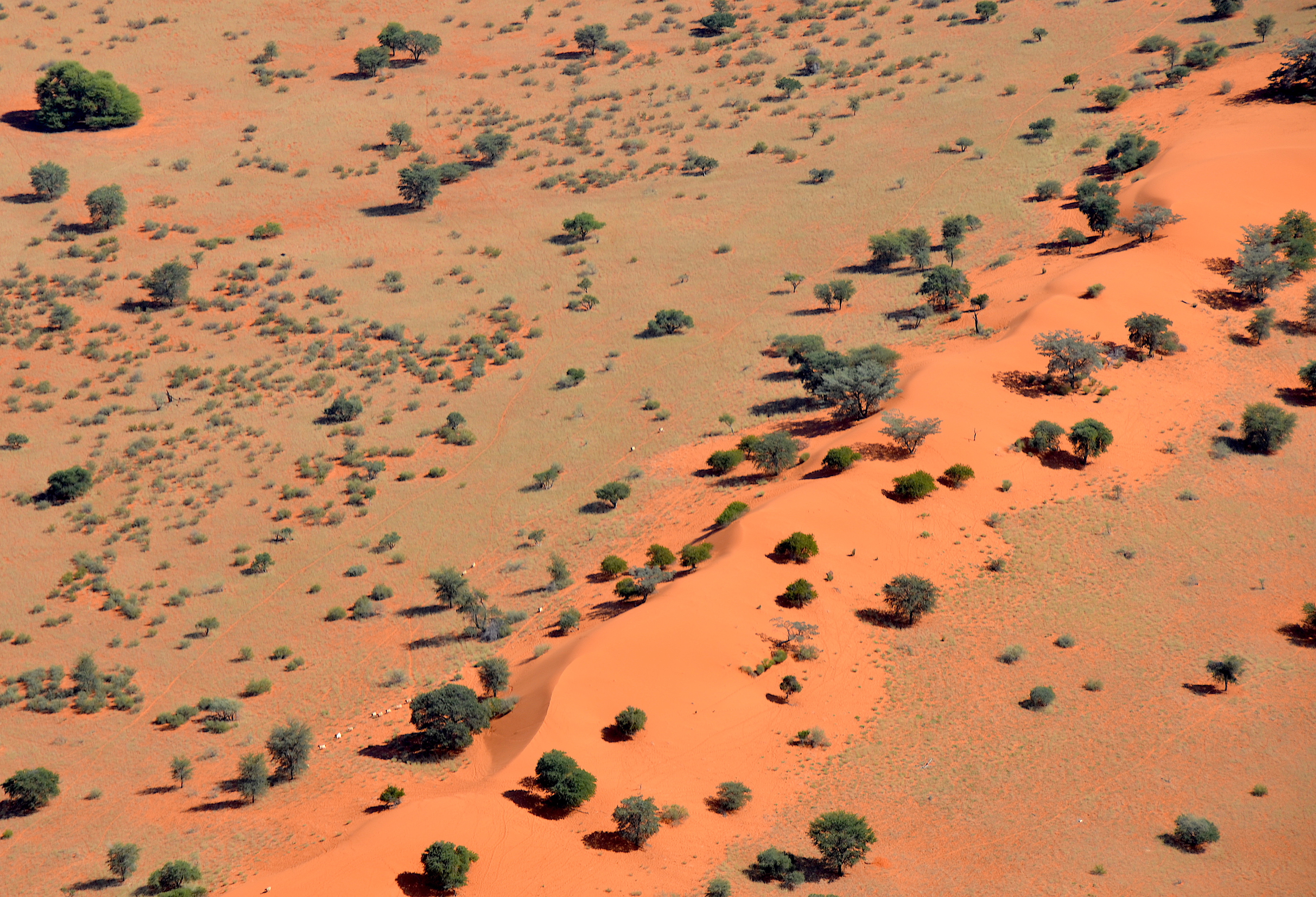
Camel thorn scattered on dunes in the Kalahari Desert

Due to its low aridity, the Kalahari supports a variety of flora. The native flora includes acacia trees and many other herbs and grasses. The kiwano fruit, also known as the horned melon, melano, African horned cucumber, jelly melon, or hedged gourd, is endemic to a region in the Kalahari Desert (specific region unknown).

Even where the Kalahari "desert" is dry enough to qualify as a desert in the sense of having low precipitation, it is not strictly speaking a desert because it has too dense a ground cover. The main region that lacks ground cover is in the southwest Kalahari (southeast of Namibia, northwest of South Africa, and southwest of Botswana) in the south of the Kgalagadi Transfrontier Park. For instance, in the ZF Mgcawu District Municipality of South Africa, total vegetation cover may be as low as 30.72% on non-protected (from cattle grazing) farmlands south of Twee Rivieren Rest Camp and 37.74% in the protected (from cattle grazing) South African side of the Kgalagadi Transfrontier Park: these southernmost Kalahari xeric savanna areas are truly semi-deserts. However, in all the remaining Kalahari, except on salt pans during the dry season, the vegetation cover can be denser, up to almost 100%, in some limited areas.

In an area of about 600,000 km^{2} in the south and west of the Kalahari, the vegetation is mainly xeric savanna. This area is the ecoregion identified by World Wide Fund for Nature as Kalahari xeric savanna AT1309. Typical savanna grasses include Schmidtia, Stipagrostis, Aristida, and Eragrostis; these are interspersed with trees such as Camelthorn (Vachellia erioloba), Grey Camelthorn (Vachellia haematoxylon), shepherd's tree (Boscia albitrunca), Blackthorn (Senegalia mellifera), and Silver Cluster-Leaf (Terminalia sericea).

In certain areas where the climate is drier, it becomes a true semi-desert with ground not entirely covered by vegetation: "open" as opposed to "closed" vegetation. Examples include the north of the ZF Mgcawu District Municipality, itself in the north of South Africa, and the Keetmanshoop Rural in the southeast of Namibia. In the north and east, dry forests cover an area of over 300,000 km^{2} in which Rhodesian teak and several species of acacia are prominent. These regions are termed Kalahari acacia–baikiaea woodlands AT0709.

Outside the Kalahari "desert", but in the Kalahari basin, halophytic vegetation to the north is adapted to pans, lakes that are completely dry during the dry season, and maybe for years during droughts, such as in Etosha (Etosha Pan halophytics AT0902) and Makgadikgadi (Zambezian halophytics AT0908).A totally different vegetation is adapted to the perennial fresh water of the Okavango Delta, an ecoregion termed Zambezian flooded grasslands AT0907.

== Fauna ==
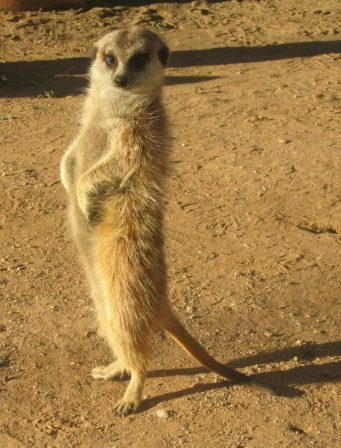
A meerkat in the Kalahari

The Kalahari is home to the lion (Panthera leo), cheetah (Acinonyx jubatus), African leopard (Panthera pardus), spotted hyena (Crocuta crocuta), brown hyena (Parahyaena brunnea), and African wild dog (Lycaon pictus). Birds of prey include the secretarybird (Sagittarius serpentarius), martial eagle (Polemaetus bellicosus) and other eagles, the giant eagle owl (Bubo lacteus) and other owls, falcons, goshawks, kestrels, and kites. Other animals include wildebeest, springbok, gemsbok and other antelopes, Cape porcupines (Hystrix africaeaustralis), and ostriches (Struthio camelus).Some of the areas within the Kalahari are seasonal wetlands, such as the Makgadikgadi Pans of Botswana. This area, for example, supports numerous halophilic species, and in the rainy season, tens of thousands of flamingos visit these pans.

== Protected areas ==
The following protected areas were established in the Kalahari:

- Central Kalahari Game Reserve
- Kgalagadi Transfrontier Park
- Khutse Game Reserve
- Tswalu Kalahari

== Population ==
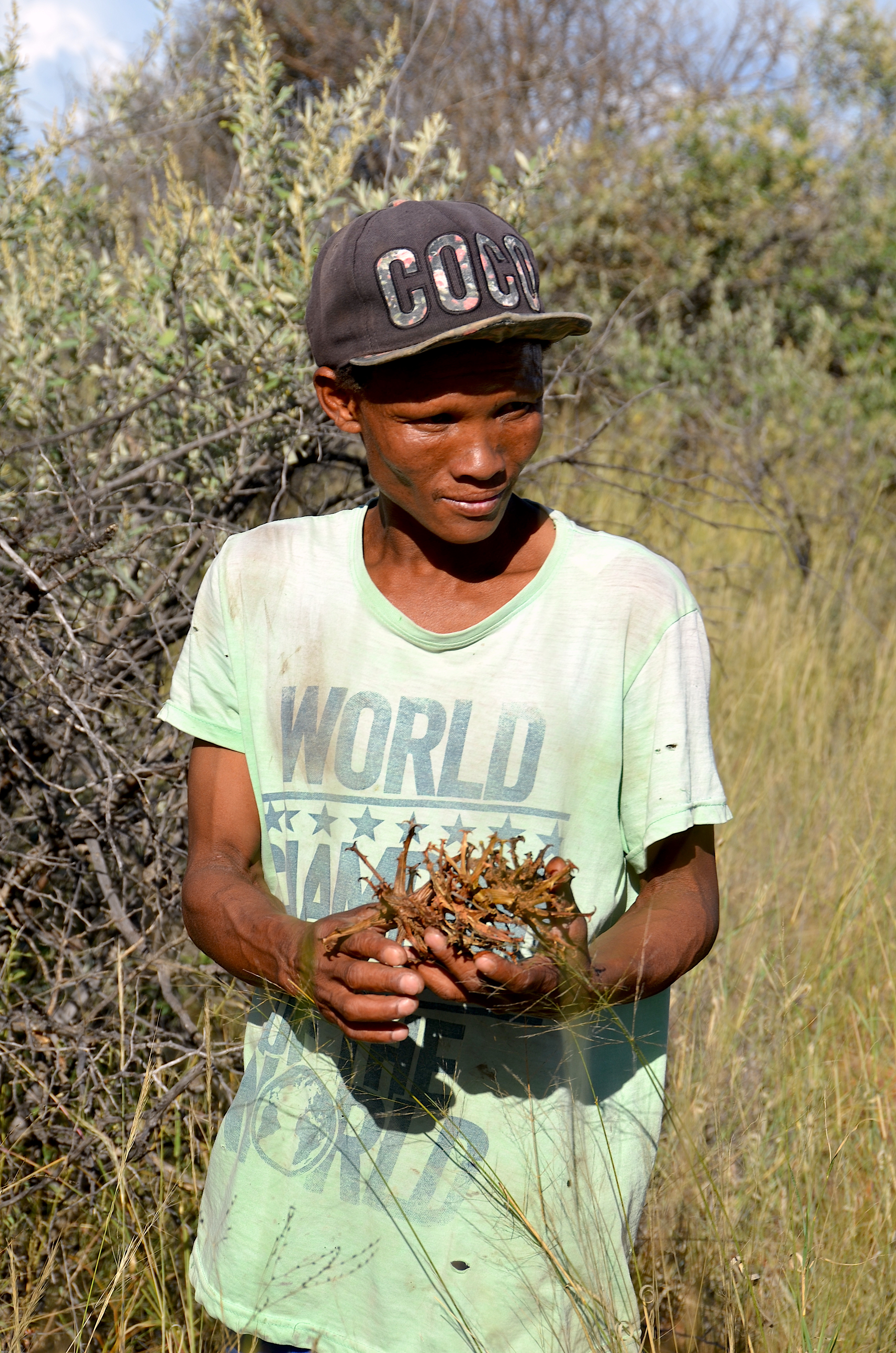
San man collecting devil's claw (2017)

The San people have lived in the Kalahari for 20,000 years as hunter-gatherers. They hunt wild game with bows and poisoned arrows and gather edible plants, such as berries, melons and nuts, as well as insects. The San get most of their water requirements from plant roots and desert melons found on or under the desert floor. They often store water in the blown-out shells of ostrich eggs. The San live in huts built from local materials—the frame is made of branches, and the roof is thatched with long grass. Most of their hunting and gathering techniques replicate those of pre-historic tribes. Bantu-speaking Tswana, Kgalagadi, Herero and a small number of European settlers also live in the Kalahari desert. The city of Windhoek is situated in the Kalahari Basin.

== Kalahari, San and diamonds ==
In 1996, De Beers evaluated the potential of diamond mining at Gope. In 1997, the eviction of the San and Bakgalagadi tribes in the Central Kalahari Game Reserve from their land began. In 2006, the High Court of Botswana ruled in favor of the San and Bakgalagadi tribes in the reserve, finding their eviction unlawful. The Government of Botswana granted a permit to De Beers' Gem Diamonds/Gope Exploration Company (Pty) Ltd. to conduct mining activities within the reserve.

== Settlements within the Kalahari ==
Botswana

- Gaborone
- Ghanzi
- Orapa
- Tshabong
- Tshane

Namibia

- Gobabis
- Mariental

South Africa

- Upington
- Noenieput
- Rietfontein

== See also ==
- Karoo
- Kgalagadi (disambiguation)
- Thar Desert
- Sahara
- Hot deserts
- Climate change in Namibia
