= Klein Mier =

- Location within Northern Cape Location within South Africa
- Coordinates: 26.7333°S 20.0333°E
- Country: South Africa
- Province: Northern Cape
- District: ZF Mgcawu
- Municipality: Dawid Kruiper

Area
  - Total: 1.01 km^{2} (0.39 sq mi)

Population (2011)
  - Total: 449
  - Density: 445/km^{2} (1,150/sq mi)

Racial makeup (2011)
  - Black African: 2.9%
  - Coloured: 96.9%
  - Other: 0.2%

First languages (2011)
  - Afrikaans: 98.4%
  - Other: 1.6%
- Time zone: UTC+2 (SAST)

Klein Mier is a small town in the Dawid Kruiper Local Municipality within the ZF Mgcawu District Municipality in the Northern Cape province of South Africa. 449 people reside in the town, 96.88% of whom are Coloured. Afrikaans is spoken by 98.22% of the population.
