= Child marriage in Botswana =

Marriage of minors in Botswana

Botswana has low incidence of marriages of children overall but the practice is reported to be a major issue among the Basarwa, Zezuru, parts of the Kgalagadi communities and in North Western Botswana. There is little information available on the issue.

== Botswana Marriage Act ==
- Registration of marriages of religious and customary marriages.
- Increased the age of marriage to 21 without consent.
- Persons below the age of 18 can only marriage with the consent of parents.
