= Wegdraai =

- Location within Northern Cape Location within South Africa
- Coordinates: 28.838°S 21.865°E
- Country: South Africa
- Province: Northern Cape
- District: ZF Mgcawu
- Municipality: !Kheis

Area
  - Total: 2.70 km^{2} (1.04 sq mi)

Population (2011)
  - Total: 2,189
  - Density: 811/km^{2} (2,100/sq mi)

Racial makeup (2011)
  - Black African: 3.0%
  - Coloured: 96.3%
  - Indian/Asian: 0.4%
  - White: 0.4%

First languages (2011)
  - Afrikaans: 98.7%
  - Other: 1.3%
- Time zone: UTC+2 (SAST)
- Postal code (street): 8826
- PO box: 8826

Wegdraai is a town in ZF Mgcawu District Municipality in the Northern Cape province of South Africa.
