= Kalahari High =

The Kalahari High is an anticyclone that forms in winter over the interior of southern Africa, replacing a summer trough. It is part of the subtropical ridge system and the reason the Kalahari is a desert. It is the descending limb of a Hadley cell.
