= Z. F. Mgcawu =

South African activist

Zwelentlanga Fatman Mgcawu, commonly known as Fatman, was born in 1958 and grew up in Pabalello, Upington, South Africa, becoming Upington's first black mayor in the first post-1994 local government elections. In 2013 the erstwhile Siyanda District Municipality in the Northern Cape, with Upington as its administrative centre, was renamed ZF Mgcawu District Municipality. Mgcawu died in July 2001 at age 43.

Mgcawu is said to have been "a man with many talents." Attending the University of Cape Town, he emerged from the Drama Department with training as an actor. "He was a passionate actor and comedian," states the local government website following the Siyanda District's being renamed in his honour. "He dedicated his life to the fight against the apartheid system," reports the Kathu Gazette.

In addition to his acting and political roles he is also recorded as having been active in a church role. He pursued poverty alleviation projects and was instrumental in the upgrading of the Upington Airport.

The process of renaming the Siyanda District in Mgcawu's honour began in 2010, being subsequently published in the Provincial Government Gazette on 22 October 2012, notice 14 of 2012; the then Siyanda District Council deciding on an implementation date of 1 July 2013.
