= Kgalagadi people =

Sotho-Tswana ethnic group of northeast South Africa

Makgalagadi

Total population
- Botswana

Languages
- First language Kgalagadi; Second language English, Tswana

Religion
- Christianity, African traditional religion

Related ethnic groups
- Lobedu people, Sotho people, Tswana people, other Sotho-Tswana peoples

Kgalagadi
- Person: Mokgalagadi
- People: Bakgalagadi
- Language: Shekgalagadi

The Kgalagadi, or Bakgalagadi, are a Sotho-Tswana ethnic group native to Botswana. They are a section of the Batswana people. The name "Bakgalagadi" means "people of the Kalahari", and the group is thought to have migrated into Botswana from the Transvaal region of South Africa in the 17th century.

The Bakgalagadi are divided into several sub-groups, including the Bangologa, Baboloongwe, Baphaleng, Bakgwatheng and Bashaga. This divisions are at best simplification, for example, communities commonly grouped as Bangologa have rich variety of local sub identities like Baeharu( Baehadu), and their offshoots Baehazwana, Bakgala, Batjhaga, Baselebe and some of the groups above align themselves as the descent from founder named Morolong, whose sons and or descendants are said are said to have included Moeharu, Motjhaga, Moselebe, Moritji and Mokgwatheng. They are primarily concentrated in the central regions of the Kalahari Desert, in the Gantsi and Kgalagadi Districts.

The Bakgalagadi are a pastoralist people, and their traditional economy is based on cattle herding and agriculture. They also practice hunting and gathering. The Bakgalagadi are known for their distinctive culture and traditions, which include their unique language, music, and dance.

== See also ==
- Tswana people
- Sotho people
- Sotho-Tswana peoples
- Barotseland
- Lozi people
- Bokone
