= Finsch diamond mine =

Diamond mine in South Africa

Coordinates: 28°22′56″S 23°26′46″E

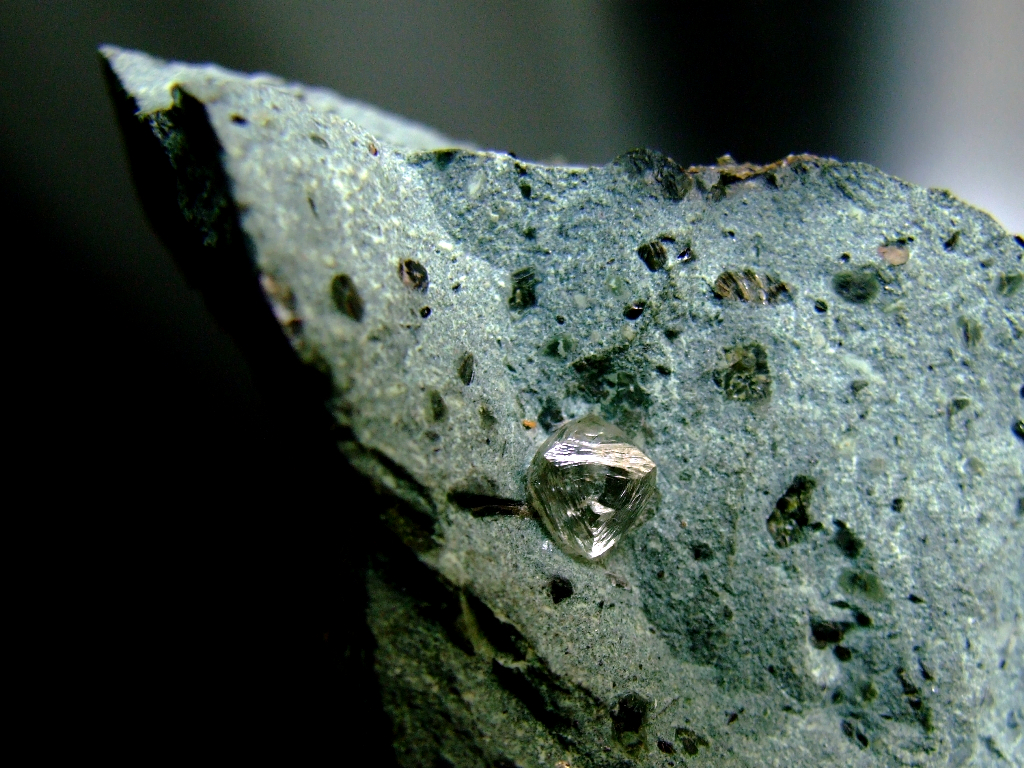
Natural diamond crystal in kimberlite from Finsch Diamond Mine

The Finsch Mine is an underground diamond mine in the Northern Cape (South Africa). Located near Lime Acres, 160 km northwest of Kimberley, it was one of seven operations managed by De Beers Consolidated Mines (DBCM), formed in July 2004. Currently, it is owned by Petra Diamonds Pty Ltd.

The Finsch mine is a traditional diamantiferous kimberlite pipe, extending around 17.9 ha. The pit is currently around 600m deep, reserves are sufficient for another 23 years. Underground development started in 1978 and the shaft was commissioned in 1982.
