= Daniëlskuil =

Daniëlskuil die kuile
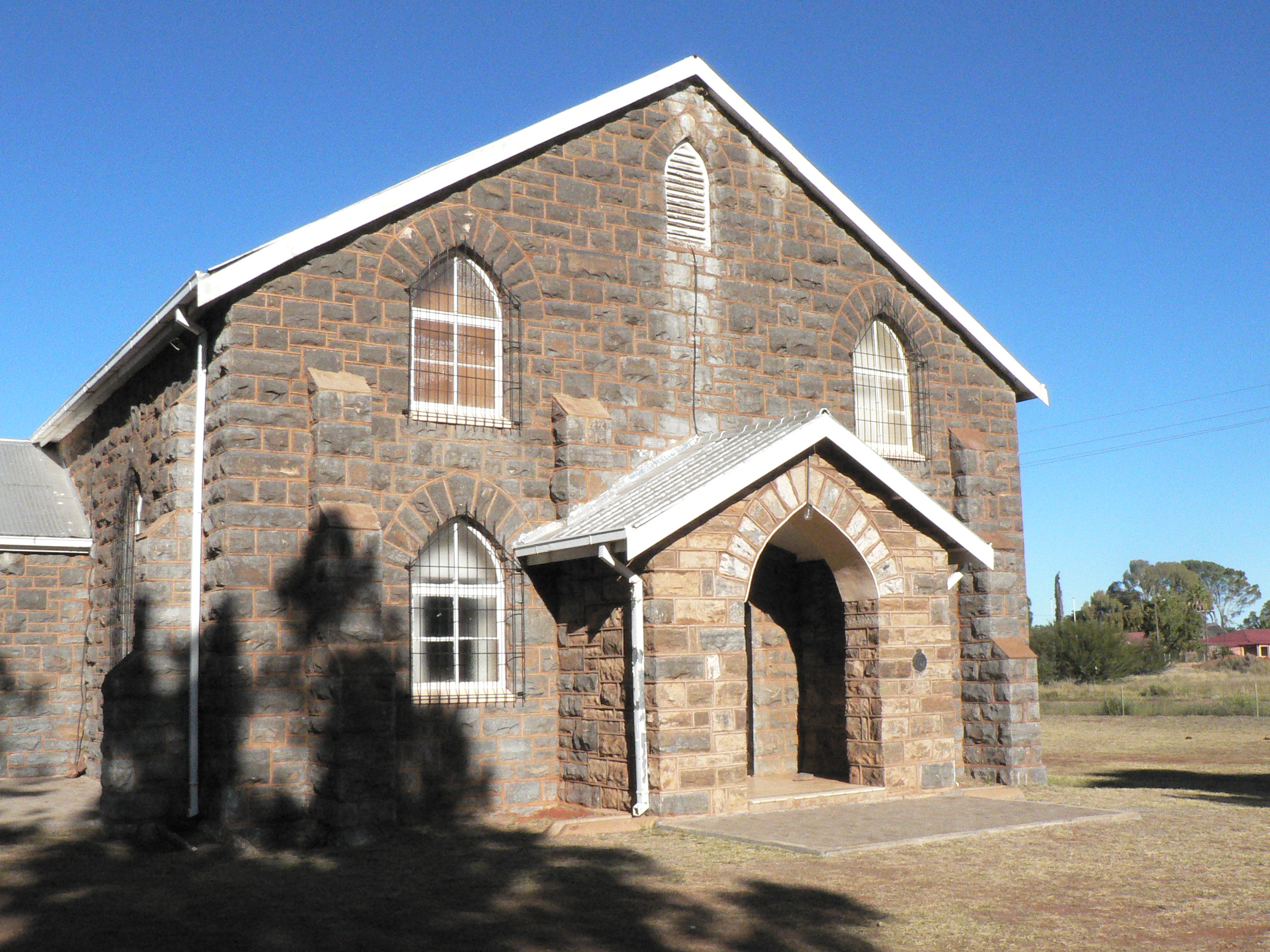
- Second Dutch Reformed Church, Danielskuil

- Location within Northern Cape Location within South Africa
- Coordinates: 28°12′S 23°35′E
- Country: South Africa
- Province: Northern Cape
- District: ZF Mgcawu
- Municipality: Kgatelopele

Area
  - Total: 174.63 km^{2} (67.43 sq mi)

Population (2011)
  - Total: 13,597
  - Density: 77.862/km^{2} (201.66/sq mi)

Racial makeup (2011)
  - Black African: 47.4%
  - Coloured: 44.5%
  - Indian/Asian: 0.8%
  - White: 6.3%
  - Other: 1.0%

First languages (2011)
  - Afrikaans: 63.0%
  - Tswana: 30.9%
  - English: 1.8%
  - Xhosa: 1.1%
  - Other: 3.2%
- Time zone: UTC+2 (SAST)
- Postal code (street): 8405
- PO box: 8405

Daniëlskuil is a town in ZF Mgcawu District Municipality in the Northern Cape province of South Africa.

== Description ==
The settlement is 142 kilometres (88 mi) north-west of Kimberley and 72 km (45 mi) north-east of Postmasburg. It takes its name from a cone-shaped depression 6 metres (20 ft) deep in the dolomitic limestone; with a domed covering, reminiscent of the biblical ‘Daniel in the lions' den’ (Afrikaans: kuil, ‘hole’, ‘pit’). The Griqua leader Adam Kok is said to have used this depression as a prison, and to also have kept snakes in it. The area was famous because of the Griqua Chief who ruled there by the name of Barend Barends. Barend Barends was the son of a “half-Hottentot Dutchman” and one of the most important leaders along the turbulent northern frontier of the Cape Colony from 1790 to 1834. He was one of the first chiefs of the Griqua tribe, an indigenous Khoi group. A book, Barend Barends - Die Vergete Kaptein van Danielskuil, has been recently published about his story.

During the Anglo Boer war (1899–1902) the British army built and used a blockhouse fort, which overlooks the town from the north.

The area is known for rich asbestos deposits and for diamonds, while marble is also mined. Idwala Lime is the largest mining and processing operation with one of the mines near Danielskuil in the Northern Cape mining high-grade Calcitic Limestone.

The Tswana name of Danielskuil is Tlaka le Tlou or Tlaka-lo-Tlou, ‘elephant reed’.
