= Grootdrink =

- Location within Northern Cape Location within South Africa
- Coordinates: 28.561°S 21.747°E
- Country: South Africa
- Province: Northern Cape
- District: ZF Mgcawu
- Municipality: !Kheis

Area
  - Total: 0.81 km^{2} (0.31 sq mi)

Population (2011)
  - Total: 2,645
  - Density: 3,300/km^{2} (8,500/sq mi)

Racial makeup (2011)
  - Black African: 2.2%
  - Coloured: 89.4%
  - Indian/Asian: 2.2%
  - Other: 6.1%

First languages (2011)
  - Afrikaans: 96.7%
  - English: 1.3%
  - Other: 2.0%
- Time zone: UTC+2 (SAST)
- PO box: 8822
- Area code: 054

Grootdrink is a town in !Kheis Local Municipality in the Northern Cape province of South Africa on the N10 National Route and on the Orange River. The town is known as being the centre of wine production in the Northern Cape.
