= Kgatelopele Local Municipality =

Kgatelopele
- Local municipality
- Seal

- Location in the Northern Cape
- Coordinates: 28°15′S 23°40′E
- Country: South Africa
- Province: Northern Cape
- District: ZF Mgcawu
- Seat: Daniëlskuil
- Wards: 6

Government
  - Type: Municipal council
  - Mayor: Norman Prince

Area
  - Total: 2,478 km^{2} (957 sq mi)

Population (2022)
  - Total: 19,854
  - Density: 8.012/km^{2} (20.75/sq mi)

Racial makeup (2022)
  - Black African: 47.7%
  - Coloured: 40.0%
  - Indian/Asian: 0.7%
  - White: 11.6%

First languages (2011)
  - Afrikaans: 58.3%
  - Tswana: 32.7%
  - English: 2.9%
  - Xhosa: 1.6%
  - Other: 4.5%
- Time zone: UTC+2 (SAST)
- Municipal code: NC086

Kgatelopele Municipality (Afrikaans: Kgatelopele Munisipaliteit; Tswana: Mmasepala wa Kgatelopele) is a local municipality within the ZF Mgcawu District Municipality, in the Northern Cape province of South Africa. Kgatelopele is a Setswana name meaning "progress".

== Main places ==
The 2001 census divided the municipality into the following main places:

Place	Code	Area (km^{2})	Population
Danielskuil	32001	22.12	6,730
Five Mission	32002	1.70	350
Lime Acres	32004	755.53	3,723
Tlhakalatlou	32005	0.47	3,337
Remainder of the municipality	32003	2,870.45	1,305

== Demographics ==
According to the 2022 South African census, the municipality had a population of 19,854 people. Of those, 47.7% identified as "Black African," 40.0% as "Coloured," and 11.6% as "White."

== Politics ==
The municipal council consists of eleven members elected by mixed-member proportional representation. Six councillors are elected by first-past-the-post voting in six wards, while the remaining five are chosen from party lists so that the total number of party representatives is proportional to the number of votes received. In the election of 1 November 2021 no party obtained a majority on the council. The following table shows the results of the election.

Kgatelopele local election, 1 November 2021
Party	Votes				Seats		
Party	Ward	List	Total	%	Ward	List	Total
African National Congress	1,939	2,006	3,945	43.7%	5	0	5
Patriotic Alliance	810	858	1,668	18.5%	0	2	2
Democratic Alliance	762	770	1,532	17.0%	1	1	2
Economic Freedom Fighters	384	442	826	9.1%	0	1	1
Freedom Front Plus	397	381	778	8.6%	0	1	1
Independent candidates	200	–	200	2.2%	0	–	0
Azanian People's Organisation	34	47	81	0.9%	0	0	0
Total	4,526	4,504	9,030		6	5	11
Valid votes	4,526	4,504	9,030	97.8%			
Spoilt votes	89	117	206	2.2%			
Total votes cast	4,615	4,621	9,236				
Voter turnout	4,621						
Registered voters	9,518						
Turnout percentage	48.6%						

'
