= ǃKheis Local Municipality =

ǃKheis
- Local municipality
- The Orange River seen from N8 road to the south

- Seal

- Location in the Northern Cape
- Coordinates: 29°15′S 21°40′E
- Country: South Africa
- Province: Northern Cape
- District: ZF Mgcawu
- Seat: Groblershoop
- Wards: 6

Government
  - Type: Municipal council
  - Mayor: Paul Vries

Area
  - Total: 11,107 km^{2} (4,288 sq mi)

Population (2022)
  - Total: 21,954
  - Density: 1.9766/km^{2} (5.1193/sq mi)

Racial makeup (2022)
  - Black African: 4.5%
  - Coloured: 90.1%
  - Indian/Asian: 0.6%
  - White: 4.7%

First languages (2011)
  - Afrikaans: 94.5%
  - Tswana: 1.9%
  - English: 1.1%
  - Other: 2.5%
- Time zone: UTC+2 (SAST)
- Municipal code: NC084
- Website: www.kheis.co.za

ǃKheis Municipality (Afrikaans: !Kheis Munisipaliteit) is a local municipality within the ZF Mgcawu District Municipality, in the Northern Cape province of South Africa. ǃKheis is a Khoikhoi name meaning "a place where you live, or a home". The municipality is named in recognition of the Khoekhoe people who were the first permanent dwellers of the area.

== Main places ==
The 2001 census divided the municipality into the following main places:

Place	Code	Area (km^{2})	Population
Boegoeberg	31802	0.37	1,587
Gannaput	31803	0.37	965
Groblershoop	31804	1.26	437
Grootdrink	31805	0.46	2,177
Stutterheim	31806	0.80	3,043
Wegdraai	31807	0.77	1,559
Remainder of the municipality	31801	5,518.68	6,274

== Politics ==
The municipal council consists of eleven members elected by mixed-member proportional representation. Six councillors are elected by first-past-the-post voting in six wards, while the remaining five are chosen from party lists so that the total number of party representatives is proportional to the number of votes received. In the election of 1 November 2021 no party obtained a majority of seats on the council.

The following table shows the results of the election.

ǃKheis local election, 1 November 2021
Party	Votes				Seats		
Party	Ward	List	Total	%	Ward	List	Total
African National Congress	3,120	3,273	6,393	46.4%	3	2	5
Democratic Alliance	1,279	1,633	2,912	21.2%	1	1	2
Independent candidates	1,737	–	1,737	12.6%	2	–	2
Economic Freedom Fighters	420	517	937	6.8%	0	1	1
Congress of the People	205	565	770	5.6%	0	1	1
Khoisan Revolution	151	395	546	4.0%	0	0	0
Freedom Front Plus	118	354	472	3.4%	0	0	0
Total	7,030	6,737	13,767		6	5	11
Valid votes	7,030	6,737	13,767	96.6%			
Spoilt votes	102	385	487	3.4%			
Total votes cast	7,132	7,122	14,254				
Voter turnout	7,140						
Registered voters	10,075						
Turnout percentage	70.9%						

== Economy ==
As of 2020, 500 homes are powered by solar panels with battery storage.

== Financial mismanagement ==
In January 2025, the municipality was listed as one of the top ten municipalities in arrears on their pension contributions.
