= Tsantsabane Local Municipality =

Tsantsabane
- Local municipality
- Seal

- Location in the Northern Cape
- Coordinates: 28°15′S 22°30′E
- Country: South Africa
- Province: Northern Cape
- District: ZF Mgcawu
- Seat: Postmasburg
- Wards: 7

Government
  - Type: Municipal council
  - Mayor: Mpho Mashila (African National Congress)

Area
  - Total: 18,333 km^{2} (7,078 sq mi)

Population (2022)
  - Total: 30,969
  - Density: 1.6892/km^{2} (4.3751/sq mi)

Racial makeup (2022)
  - Black African: 62.9%
  - Coloured: 31.6%
  - Indian/Asian: 0.6%
  - White: 4.9%

First languages (2011)
  - Afrikaans: 55.2%
  - Tswana: 33.2%
  - Xhosa: 2.4%
  - English: 2.3%
  - Other: 6.9%
- Time zone: UTC+2 (SAST)
- Municipal code: NC085

Tsantsabane Municipality (Afrikaans: Tsantsabane Munisipaliteit; Tswana: Mmasepala wa Tsantsabane) is a local municipality within the ZF Mgcawu District Municipality, in the Northern Cape province of South Africa.

Tsantsabane was the original name given to the town by the Batswana because of the presence of many shiny stones (e.g. the hematite).

== Main places ==
The 2011 census divided the municipality into the following main places:

Place	Code	Area (km^{2})	Population
Glosam	381002	1.20	119
Goedgedacht	381003	0.28	746
Groenwater	381004	1.40	739
Postmasburg	381005	158.41	30,089
Tsantsabane NU and the remainder of the municipality	381001	18171.50	3,399

== Politics ==
The municipal council consists of thirteen members elected by mixed-member proportional representation. Seven councillors are elected by first-past-the-post voting in seven wards, while the remaining six are chosen from party lists so that the total number of party representatives is proportional to the number of votes received. In the election of 1 November 2021 the African National Congress (ANC) won a majority of seven seats on the council. The following table shows the results of the election.

Tsantsabane local election, 1 November 2021
Party	Votes				Seats		
Party	Ward	List	Total	%	Ward	List	Total
African National Congress	4,534	4,478	9,012	50.4%	7	0	7
Save Tsantsabane Coalition	1,609	1,817	3,426	19.2%	0	2	2
Democratic Alliance	1,294	1,310	2,604	14.6%	0	2	2
Economic Freedom Fighters	1,085	1,063	2,148	12.0%	0	2	2
Freedom Front Plus	214	209	423	2.4%	0	0	0
Independent candidates	185	–	185	1.0%	0	–	0
African People's Convention	34	42	76	0.4%	0	0	0
Total	8,955	8,919	17,874		7	6	13
Valid votes	8,955	8,919	17,874	97.7%			
Spoilt votes	214	200	414	2.3%			
Total votes cast	9,169	9,119	18,288				
Voter turnout	9,170						
Registered voters	18,336						
Turnout percentage	50.0%						
