= Groblershoop =

- Location within Northern Cape Location within South Africa
- Coordinates: 28°53′50″S 21°59′4″E
- Country: South Africa
- Province: Northern Cape
- District: ZF Mgcawu
- Municipality: !Kheis
- Established: 1936

Area
  - Total: 13.67 km^{2} (5.28 sq mi)

Population (2011)
  - Total: 4,938
  - Density: 361.2/km^{2} (935.6/sq mi)

Racial makeup (2011)
  - Black African: 9.0%
  - Coloured: 85.1%
  - Indian/Asian: 0.9%
  - White: 4.2%
  - Other: 0.8%

First languages (2011)
  - Afrikaans: 93.3%
  - Xhosa: 1.7%
  - Tswana: 1.4%
  - Other: 3.6%
- Time zone: UTC+2 (SAST)
- Postal code (street): 8850
- PO box: 8850
- Area code: 054

Groblershoop is a settlement in ZF Mgcawu District Municipality in the Northern Cape province of South Africa. It is situated about 2 km west of the Orange River.

Groblershoop was founded in 1914 on the farm Sternham, but was renamed in 1939 after Piet Grobler, a former Minister of Agriculture. The region became more developed after the construction of the Boegoeberg Dam and water channels in 1929. Known as the gateway to the Green Kalahari, the Groblershoop region is a major wine-producing area.
