= Kgalagadi language =

Sotho–Tswana language of southern Botswana

Kgalagadi
- Kalahari
- SheKgalagadi
- Native to: Botswana
- Ethnicity: Kgalagadi
- Native speakers: 65,400 (2015)
- Language family: Niger-Congo: Atlantic–Congo; Volta-Congo; Benue–Congo; Bantoid; Southern Bantoid; Bantu; Southern Bantu; Sotho–Tswana; Kgalagadi

Language codes
- ISO 639-3: xkv
- Glottolog: kgal1244
- Guthrie code: S.311 (ex-S.31d)
- ELP: Kgalagadi
- Linguasphere: incl. varieties 99-AUT-eha to 99-AUT-ehc 99-AUT-eh incl. varieties 99-AUT-eha to 99-AUT-ehc

Kgalagadi is a Bantu language spoken in Botswana, along the South African border. It is spoken by about 40,000 people. In the language, it is known as Shekgalagari.

== Classification ==
Kgalagadi (also rendered Kgalagari, Kgalagarhi, Kgalagari, Khalagari, Khalakadi, Kxhalaxadi, Qhalaxarzi, Shekgalagadi, Shekgalagari, Kqalaqadi) is most closely related to Tswana, and until recently was classified as a dialect of Tswana.

Dialects include Shengologa, Sheshaga, Shebolaongwe, Shelala, Shekhena, Sheritjhauba and Shekgwatheng.

== Phonology ==
=== Vowels ===
	Front	Central	Back
Close	i		u
Close-mid	e ~ ɪ		o ~ ʊ
Open-mid	ɛ		ɔ
Open		a	

- Close-mid vowels /e, o/ are frequently heard as near-close sounds [ɪ, ʊ] among speakers in free variation.

=== Consonants ===
		Labial	Dental	Alveolar		Post- alveolar		Palatal		Velar	Uvular	Glottal
		Labial	Dental	plain	lab.	plain	lab.	plain	lab.	Velar	Uvular	Glottal
Stop	voiceless	p	t̪					c	cʷ	k	q	
Stop	aspirated	pʰ	t̪ʰ					cʰ	cʰʷ	kʰ	qʰ	
Stop	voiced	b	d̪					ɟ		g		
Affricate	voiceless			t͡s	t͡sʷ	t͡ʃ	t͡ʃʷ					
Affricate	aspirated			t͡sʰ	t͡sʰʷ	t͡ʃʰ	t͡ʃʰʷ					
Affricate	voiced			(d͡z)		d͡ʒ						
Fricative	voiceless			s		ʃ	ʃʷ				χ	h
Fricative	voiced			z		ʒ	ʒʷ					(ɦ)
Nasal		m	(n̪)	n				ɲ		ŋ		
Trill				r								
Approximant				l				j		w		

- Click sounds /ʘ, ǀ, ǀŋ, ǃŋ/ are also said to occur, but mostly in rare cases.
- A voiceless trill [r̥] may also occur phonemically among dialects, and may also be pronounced as breathy [r̤] in intervocalic positions.
- /r/ may also be heard as a flap [ɾ].
- /n/ may also be heard as [n̪] in free variation, or when preceding dental stops.
- /qʰ/ may also be heard as [q͡χʰ] in free variation.
- Lateral affricates [t͡ɬ, t͡ɬʰ] may occur from loanwords.
- Sounds /z, ʒ/ can be pronounced in free variation as affricates [d͡z, d͡ʒ] in the Bolaongwe dialect.
- /h/ can be heard as voiced [ɦ] when in intervocalic positions.
