= Dawid Kruiper Local Municipality =

Coordinates: 28.4600°S 21.2300°E

- Local municipality
- Country: South Africa
- Province: Northern Cape
- District: ZF Mgcawu
- Seat: Upington

Government
  - Type: Municipal council

Area
  - Total: 44,231 km^{2} (17,078 sq mi)

Population (2011)
  - Total: 100,497
  - Density: 2.2721/km^{2} (5.8847/sq mi)
- Time zone: UTC+2 (SAST)
- Municipal code: NC087

Dawid Kruiper Municipality (Afrikaans: Dawid Kruiper Munisipaliteit) is a local municipality within the ZF Mgcawu District Municipality, in the Northern Cape province of South Africa. It was established after the August 2016 local elections by merging the Mier and //Khara Hais local municipalities. The municipality is named after the San politician Dawid Kruiper.

== Demographics ==
According to the 2022 census, the municipality had a population of 125,744 people, representing an increase from 100,498 in 2011. Of these, 70.7% identified as "Coloured," 19.7% as "Black African," and 8.5% as "White."

== Politics ==
The municipal council consists of thirty-three members elected by mixed-member proportional representation. Seventeen councillors are elected by first-past-the-post voting in seven wards, while the remaining sixteen are chosen from party lists so that the total number of party representatives is proportional to the number of votes received. In the election of 1 November 2021 the African National Congress (ANC) won a majority of eighteen seats on the council.

The following table shows the results of the election.

Dawid Kruiper local election, 1 November 2021
Party	Votes				Seats		
Party	Ward	List	Total	%	Ward	List	Total
African National Congress	17,470	17,262	34,732	55.1%	14	4	18
Democratic Alliance	10,991	11,169	22,160	35.2%	3	9	12
Khoisan Revolution	927	1,017	1,944	3.1%	0	1	1
Freedom Front Plus	786	771	1,557	2.5%	0	1	1
Economic Freedom Fighters	523	556	1,079	1.7%	0	1	1
Congress of the People	305	365	670	1.1%	0	0	0
Independent South African National Civic Organisation	166	168	334	0.5%	0	0	0
African Christian Democratic Party	147	123	270	0.4%	0	0	0
Africa Restoration Alliance	72	68	140	0.2%	0	0	0
Patriotic Alliance	63	–	63	0.1%	0	–	0
African Transformation Movement	15	28	43	0.1%	0	0	0
Total	31,465	31,527	62,992		17	16	33
Valid votes	31,465	31,527	62,992	98.4%			
Spoilt votes	490	555	1,045	1.6%			
Total votes cast	31,955	32,082	64,037				
Voter turnout	32,259						
Registered voters	59,509						
Turnout percentage	54.2%						
