= ZF Mgcawu District Municipality =

ZF Mgcawu Benede Oranje
- District municipality
- Location in South Africa
- Coordinates: 28°0′S 21°30′E
- Country: South Africa
- Province: Northern Cape
- Seat: Upington
- Local municipalities: List: Kai !Garib; !Kheis; Tsantsabane; Kgatelopele; Dawid Kruiper

Government
  - Type: Municipal council
  - Mayor: Gift van Staden

Area
  - Total: 102,524 km^{2} (39,585 sq mi)

Population (2011)
  - Total: 236,783
  - Density: 2.30954/km^{2} (5.98167/sq mi)

Racial makeup (2011)
  - Black African: 29.4%
  - Coloured: 60.4%
  - Indian/Asian: 0.7%
  - White: 8.2%

First languages (2011)
  - Afrikaans: 76.4%
  - Tswana: 15.8%
  - Xhosa: 2.7%
  - English: 1.8%
  - Other: 3.3%
- Time zone: UTC+2 (SAST)
- Municipal code: DC8

The ZF Mgcawu District Municipality (Afrikaans: ZF Mgcawu-distriksmunisipaliteit; Tswana: Mmasepala wa Sedika wa ZF Mgcawu), known before 1 July 2013 as the Siyanda District Municipality, is one of the 5 districts of the Northern Cape province of South Africa. The seat of the municipality is Upington. As of 2011, the majority (76%) of its 236,783 residents speak Afrikaans. The district code is DC8.

The ZF Mgcawu District Municipality is named after Upington's first post-1994 democratically elected mayor, Zwelentlanga Fatman Mgcawu (1958–2001). The previous name Siyanda means "we are growing".

== Geography ==
=== Neighbours ===
ZF Mgcawu is surrounded by:

- the Republic of Botswana in the north
- John Taolo Gaetsewe (DC45), formerly Kgalagadi, in the north-east
- Frances Baard (DC9) in the east
- Pixley ka Seme (DC7) in the south-east
- Namakwa (DC6) in the south-west
- the Republic of Namibia in the west

=== Local municipalities ===
The district contains the following local municipalities:

Local municipality	Population	%	Dominant language
//Khara Hais	73 786	35.16%	Afrikaans
Kai !Garib	57 689	27.49%	Afrikaans
Tsantsabane	31 010	14.77%	Afrikaans
!Kheis	16 029	7.64%	Afrikaans
Kgatelopele	15 448	7.36%	Afrikaans
Mier	6 850	3.26%	Afrikaans
District Management Area	9 083	4.33%	

== Demographics ==
The following statistics are from the 2001 census.

Language	Population	%
Afrikaans	171 371	81.65%
Setswana	28 595	13.62%
IsiXhosa	5 393	2.57%
English	1 632	0.78%
Sesotho	1 376	0.66%
Other	822	0.39%
IsiZulu	266	0.13%
Sepedi	101	0.05%
IsiNdebele	99	0.05%
Tshivenda	97	0.05%
SiSwati	76	0.04%
Xitsonga	67	0.03%

=== Gender ===
Gender	Population	%
Female	107 480	51.21%
Male	102 403	48.79%

=== Ethnic group ===
Ethnic group	Population	%
Coloured	133 711	63.71%
Black African	51 353	24.47%
White	24 633	11.74%
Indian/Asian	186	0.09%

=== Age ===
Age	Population	%
000 - 004	22 038	10.50%
005 - 009	21 689	10.33%
010 - 014	21 341	10.17%
015 - 019	21 753	10.36%
020 - 024	19 101	9.10%
025 - 029	18 165	8.65%
030 - 034	16 403	7.82%
035 - 039	14 837	7.07%
040 - 044	13 001	6.19%
045 - 049	10 592	5.05%
050 - 054	8 409	4.01%
055 - 059	6 343	3.02%
060 - 064	5 504	2.62%
065 - 069	4 226	2.01%
070 - 074	2 720	1.30%
075 - 079	1 831	0.87%
080 - 084	1 164	0.55%
085 - 089	512	0.24%
090 - 094	209	0.10%
095 - 099	33	0.02%
100 plus	12	0.01%

== Politics ==
=== Election results ===
Election results for Siyanda in the South African general election, 2004.

- Population 18 and over: 131 760 [62.78% of total population]
- Total votes: 75 264 [35.86% of total population]
- Voting % estimate: 57.12% votes as a % of population 18 and over

Party	Votes	%
African National Congress	50 826	67.53%
Independent Democrats	7 747	10.29%
Democratic Alliance	6 776	9.00%
New National Party	5 401	7.18%
African Christian Democratic Party	1 299	1.73%
Freedom Front Plus	1 269	1.69%
United Democratic Movement	690	0.92%
Azanian People's Organisation	372	0.49%
Pan African Congress	183	0.24%
United Christian Democratic Party	160	0.21%
Inkhata Freedom Party	110	0.15%
EMSA	66	0.09%
NA	65	0.09%
PJC	59	0.08%
KISS	48	0.06%
SOPA	45	0.06%
UF	36	0.05%
CDP	32	0.04%
NLP	32	0.04%
TOP	28	0.04%
Minority Front	20	0.03%
Total	75 264	100.00%
