= City of Johannesburg elections =

Local elections in Johannesburg, Gauteng, South Africa

The City of Johannesburg Metropolitan Municipality council consists of 270 city councilors elected by mixed-member proportional representation. The councillors are divided into two kinds: (a) 135 Ward councillors who have been elected by first-past-the-post voting in 135 wards; and (b) 135 councillors elected from party lists (so that the total number of party representatives is proportional to the number of votes received).

Ward Councillors have more local responsibilities, including setting up Ward Committees in their wards to raise local issues, commenting on town planning and other local matters in their ward, and liaising with local ratepayers' and residents' associations. PR Councillors are usually allocated to more political tasks within their party structures and within the City.

== Results ==
The following table shows the composition of the council after past elections.

Event	ANC	DA	ASA	EFF	PA	IFP	FF+	NNP	Other	Total
2000 election	128	73	—	—	—	8	1	—	7	217
2002 floor-crossing	133	59	—	—	—	7	0	8	10	217
2004 floor-crossing	139	60	—	—	—	8	0	0	10	217
2006 election	136	59	—	—	—	7	1	—	14	217
2007 floor-crossing	137	59	—	—	—	9	1	—	11	217
2011 election	153	90	—	—	—	4	1	—	12	260
2016 election	121	104	—	30	1	5	1	—	8	270
2021 election	91	71	44	29	8	7	4	—	16	270
2026 election	63	91	43	17	5	7	5	—	39	270

== December 2000 ==
The following table shows the results of the 2000 election.

Party	Ward			List			Total seats
Party	Votes	%	Seats	Votes	%	Seats	Total seats
African National Congress	354,225	59.00	70	352,707	58.79	58	128
Democratic Alliance	202,421	33.72	37	199,905	33.32	36	73
Inkatha Freedom Party	20,924	3.49	2	21,730	3.62	6	8
Pan Africanist Congress of Azania	7,088	1.18	0	7,713	1.29	3	3
United Democratic Movement	2,443	0.41	0	4,836	0.81	1	1
Independent candidates	6,397	1.07	0				0
African Christian Democratic Party	726	0.12	0	4,196	0.70	1	1
Christian Democratic Party	1,752	0.29	0	2,506	0.42	1	1
Azanian People's Organisation	1,455	0.24	0	1,943	0.32	1	1
Freedom Front Plus	1,478	0.25	0	1,114	0.19	1	1
Gemini Movement	716	0.12	0	1,086	0.18	0	0
Green Party of South Africa	209	0.03	0	1,335	0.22	0	0
Workers Party	208	0.03	0	866	0.14	0	0
Thembelihle Masibambane Civic Organisation	330	0.05	0				0
Total	600,372	100.00	109	599,937	100.00	108	217
Valid votes	600,372	98.29		599,937	98.25		
Invalid/blank votes	10,458	1.71		10,686	1.75		
Total votes	610,830	100.00		610,623	100.00		
Registered voters/turnout	1,552,791	39.34		1,552,791	39.32		

=== By-elections (December 2000–October 2002) ===
The following by-elections were held to fill vacant ward seats in the period between the election in December 2000 and the floor crossing period in October 2002.

Date	Ward	Party of the previous councillor	Party of the newly elected councillor
15 September 2001	1	African National Congress	African National Congress
15 September 2001	93	Democratic Alliance	Democratic Alliance
17 April 2002	107	African National Congress	African National Congress
15 May 2002	47	African National Congress	Independent
25 September 2002	97	Democratic Alliance	Democratic Alliance

=== October 2002 floor crossing ===
In terms of the Eighth Amendment of the Constitution and the judgment of the Constitutional Court in United Democratic Movement v President of the Republic of South Africa and Others, in the period from October 8 to 22, 2002 councillors had the opportunity to cross the floor to a different political party without losing their seats.

In the Johannesburg council, eight councillors crossed from the Democratic Alliance (DA) to the New National Party (NNP), which had formerly been part of the DA, and six councillors crossed from the DA to the African National Congress (ANC). One councillor each from the Inkatha Freedom Party and the Freedom Front Plus crossed to the Christian Democratic Party (CDP). The single councillor of the Azanian People's Organisation crossed to the Black Consciousness Forum.

Party	Seats before	Net change	Seats after
African National Congress	127	▲6	133
Democratic Alliance	73	▼14	59
New National Party	–	▲8	8
Inkatha Freedom Party	8	▼1	7
Pan Africanist Congress of Azania	3	0	3
Christian Democratic Party	1	▲2	3
United Democratic Movement	1	0	1
African Christian Democratic Party	1	0	1
Independent	1	0	1
Black Consciousness Forum	—	▲1	1
Azanian People's Organisation	1	▼1	0
Freedom Front Plus	1	▼1	0

=== By-elections (October 2002–August 2004) ===
The following by-elections were held to fill vacant ward seats in the period between the floor crossing periods in October 2002 and September 2004.

Date	Ward	Party of the previous councillor	Party of the newly elected councillor
30 October 2002	75	African National Congress	Inkatha Freedom Party
22 January 2003	60	African National Congress	African National Congress
7 May 2003	57	Democratic Alliance	Democratic Alliance
15 October 2003	41	African National Congress	African National Congress
23 June 2004	70	Democratic Alliance	Democratic Alliance
23 June 2004	89	Democratic Alliance	Democratic Alliance

=== September 2004 floor crossing ===
Another floor-crossing period occurred on 1–15 September 2004. Seven councillors crossed from the NNP to the ANC, one councillor crossed from the NNP to the Independent Democrats, and one crossed from the CDP to the DA.

Party	Seats before	Net change	Seats after
African National Congress	132	▲7	139
Democratic Alliance	59	▲1	60
Inkatha Freedom Party	8	0	8
Pan Africanist Congress of Azania	3	0	3
Christian Democratic Party	3	▼1	2
United Democratic Movement	1	0	1
African Christian Democratic Party	1	0	1
Independent	1	0	1
Black Consciousness Forum	1	0	1
Independent Democrats	—	▲1	1
New National Party	8	▼8	0

=== By-elections (September 2004–February 2006) ===
The following by-elections were held to fill vacant ward seats in the period between the floor crossing periods in September 2004 and the election in March 2006.

Date	Ward	Party of the previous councillor	Party of the newly elected councillor
20 April 2005	38	African National Congress	African National Congress
27 July 2005	74	Democratic Alliance	Democratic Alliance

== March 2006 ==
The following table shows the results of the 2006 election.

Party	Ward			List			Total seats
Party	Votes	%	Seats	Votes	%	Seats	Total seats
African National Congress	429,282	61.85	75	433,051	62.74	61	136
Democratic Alliance	187,340	26.99	31	187,116	27.11	28	59
Inkatha Freedom Party	23,137	3.33	2	23,460	3.40	5	7
Independent Democrats	13,000	1.87	0	13,369	1.94	4	4
Independent candidates	13,883	2.00	1				1
African Christian Democratic Party	6,831	0.98	0	6,688	0.97	2	2
Pan Africanist Congress of Azania	5,252	0.76	0	5,638	0.82	2	2
Freedom Front Plus	3,943	0.57	0	3,951	0.57	1	1
United Democratic Movement	1,931	0.28	0	4,024	0.58	1	1
Azanian People's Organisation	2,827	0.41	0	2,993	0.43	1	1
Operation Khanyisa Movement	1,173	0.17	0	3,132	0.45	1	1
Christian Democratic Party	1,503	0.22	0	1,485	0.22	1	1
Christian Front	1,621	0.23	0	1,296	0.19	1	1
National Democratic Convention	773	0.11	0	1,608	0.23	0	0
United Independent Front	338	0.05	0	1,046	0.15	0	0
Gemini Movement	538	0.08	0	625	0.09	0	0
Black Consciousness Forum	182	0.03	0	451	0.07	0	0
Sunrise Park, Protea City and Greenside Residents' Association	469	0.07	0				0
Economic Freedom Movement	40	0.01	0	331	0.05	0	0
Total	694,063	100.00	109	690,264	100.00	108	217
Valid votes	694,063	98.56		690,264	98.29		
Invalid/blank votes	10,138	1.44		12,001	1.71		
Total votes	704,201	100.00		702,265	100.00		
Registered voters/turnout	1,739,292	40.49		1,739,292	40.38		

=== By-elections (March 2006–August 2007) ===
The following by-elections were held to fill vacant ward seats in the period between the election in March 2006 and the floor crossing period in September 2007.

Date	Ward	Party of the previous councillor	Party of the newly elected councillor
7 June 2006	10	African National Congress	African National Congress
23 May 2007	31	African National Congress	African National Congress

=== September 2007 floor crossing ===
The final floor-crossing period occurred on 1–15 September 2007; floor-crossing was subsequently abolished in 2008 by the Fifteenth Amendment of the Constitution. In the Johannesburg council two councillors crossed from the Independent Democrats to the Inkatha Freedom Party, one councillor crossed from the Pan Africanist Congress (PAC) to the African People's Convention, and one councillor crossed from the PAC to the African National Congress.

Party	Seats before	Net change	Seats after
African National Congress	136	▲1	137
Democratic Alliance	59	0	59
Inkatha Freedom Party	7	▲2	9
Independent Democrats	4	▼2	2
Independent	1	0	1
African Christian Democratic Party	2	0	2
Freedom Front Plus	1	0	1
United Democratic Movement	1	0	1
Azanian People's Organisation	1	0	1
Operation Khanyisa Movement	1	0	1
Christian Democratic Party	1	0	1
Christian Front	1	0	1
African People's Convention	—	▲1	1
Pan Africanist Congress of Azania	2	▼2	0

=== By-elections (September 2007–May 2011) ===
The following by-elections were held to fill vacant ward seats in the period between the floor crossing period in September 2007 and the election in May 2011.

Date	Ward	Party of the previous councillor	Party of the newly elected councillor
26 September 2007	22	African National Congress	African National Congress
26 September 2007	103	Democratic Alliance	Democratic Alliance
15 October 2008	76	African National Congress	African National Congress
28 January 2009	19	African National Congress	African National Congress
8 July 2009	90	Democratic Alliance	Democratic Alliance
2 September 2009	18	Democratic Alliance	Democratic Alliance

== May 2011 ==
The following table shows the results of the 2011 election.

Party	Ward			List			Total seats
Party	Votes	%	Seats	Votes	%	Seats	Total seats
African National Congress	626,026	57.82	84	646,328	59.29	69	153
Democratic Alliance	377,799	34.90	45	374,505	34.35	45	90
Inkatha Freedom Party	17,933	1.66	1	17,557	1.61	3	4
Congress of the People	12,936	1.19	0	12,099	1.11	3	3
National Freedom Party	8,022	0.74	0	8,984	0.82	2	2
Independent candidates	10,019	0.93	0				0
African People's Convention	4,223	0.39	0	5,747	0.53	1	1
African Christian Democratic Party	4,800	0.44	0	4,385	0.40	1	1
Pan Africanist Congress of Azania	4,655	0.43	0	3,838	0.35	1	1
Freedom Front Plus	2,956	0.27	0	2,477	0.23	1	1
United Democratic Movement	2,665	0.25	0	2,357	0.22	1	1
Al Jama-ah	2,027	0.19	0	2,962	0.27	1	1
Azanian People's Organisation	2,629	0.24	0	2,173	0.20	1	1
Operation Khanyisa Movement	1,666	0.15	0	2,757	0.25	1	1
Christian Democratic Party	1,136	0.10	0	999	0.09	0	0
African Christian Alliance-Afrikaner Christen Alliansie	1,241	0.11	0	770	0.07	0	0
Black Consciousness Party	775	0.07	0	654	0.06	0	0
South African Progressive Civic Organisation	665	0.06	0	531	0.05	0	0
Socialist Party of Azania	190	0.02	0	311	0.03	0	0
Christian Front	157	0.01	0	324	0.03	0	0
Liberal Democratic Party	31	0.00	0	236	0.02	0	0
United Residents Front	112	0.01	0	130	0.01	0	0
Total	1,082,663	100.00	130	1,090,124	100.00	130	260
Valid votes	1,082,663	98.56		1,090,124	98.94		
Invalid/blank votes	15,803	1.44		11,724	1.06		
Total votes	1,098,466	100.00		1,101,848	100.00		
Registered voters/turnout	2,010,121	54.65		2,010,121	54.82		

=== By-elections (May 2011–August 2016) ===
The following by-elections were held to fill vacant ward seats in the period between the elections in May 2011 and August 2016.

Date	Ward	Party of the previous councillor	Party of the newly elected councillor
25 April 2012	28	African National Congress	African National Congress
7 November 2021	58	Democratic Alliance	Democratic Alliance
24 April 2013	115	Democratic Alliance	Democratic Alliance
2 July 2014	57	Democratic Alliance	Democratic Alliance
2 July 2014	58	Democratic Alliance	African National Congress
2 July 2014	112	Democratic Alliance	Democratic Alliance
2 July 2014	118	Democratic Alliance	Democratic Alliance
13 August 2014	32	Democratic Alliance	Democratic Alliance
13 August 2014	90	Democratic Alliance	Democratic Alliance
28 January 2015	68	Democratic Alliance	Democratic Alliance
11 November 2015	73	Democratic Alliance	Democratic Alliance

== August 2016 ==
In the election of 3 August 2016 the African National Congress (ANC) won the largest share of the seats on the council with 121 but did not achieve a majority. On 22 August 2016, minority parties voted with the DA to elect its mayoral candidate, Herman Mashaba, as the first Democratic Alliance mayor of Johannesburg. Mashaba appointed a mayoral committee consisting of the DA and the Inkatha Freedom Party (IFP). Mashaba resigned on 27 November 2019. The ANC regional chair Geoff Makhubo was elected mayor on 4 December 2019, marking the return of the ANC to the city's executive since its ousting in 2016. Makhubo died from COVID-19 related complications on 9 July 2021 and Eunice Mgcina was appointed acting mayor.

The following table shows the results of the 2016 election.

Party	Ward			List			Total seats
Party	Votes	%	Seats	Votes	%	Seats	Total seats
African National Congress	554,027	44.09	84	563,912	44.92	37	121
Democratic Alliance	481,837	38.34	51	483,018	38.48	53	104
Economic Freedom Fighters	141,303	11.24	0	137,202	10.93	30	30
Inkatha Freedom Party	21,856	1.74	0	21,464	1.71	5	5
African Independent Congress	17,575	1.40	0	20,389	1.62	4	4
Independent candidates	15,416	1.23	0				0
Freedom Front Plus	4,212	0.34	0	3,916	0.31	1	1
African Christian Democratic Party	3,534	0.28	0	3,940	0.31	1	1
Al Jama-ah	2,794	0.22	0	3,908	0.31	1	1
United Democratic Movement	3,478	0.28	0	3,080	0.25	1	1
Congress of the People	1,851	0.15	0	2,679	0.21	1	1
Patriotic Alliance	1,687	0.13	0	2,148	0.17	1	1
Pan Africanist Congress of Azania	1,119	0.09	0	2,080	0.17	0	0
African People's Convention	581	0.05	0	2,064	0.16	0	0
Truly Alliance	1,511	0.12	0	1,002	0.08	0	0
Azanian People's Organisation	1,279	0.10	0	815	0.06	0	0
Operation Khanyisa Movement	794	0.06	0	995	0.08	0	0
Patriotic Association of South Africa	694	0.06	0	625	0.05	0	0
Socialist Party of Azania	281	0.02	0	343	0.03	0	0
International Revelation Congress	180	0.01	0	369	0.03	0	0
Agang South Africa	97	0.01	0	380	0.03	0	0
African People's Socialist Party	267	0.02	0	195	0.02	0	0
Ubuntu Party	66	0.01	0	380	0.03	0	0
Building a Cohesive Society	120	0.01	0	158	0.01	0	0
People's Civic Organisation	62	0.00	0	173	0.01	0	0
Prem Peoples Agenda	27	0.00	0	93	0.01	0	0
Bolsheviks Party of South Africa	0	0.00	0	57	0.00	0	0
United Front of Civics	50	0.00	0				0
Total	1,256,698	100.00	135	1,255,385	100.00	135	270
Valid votes	1,256,698	98.69		1,255,385	98.56		
Invalid/blank votes	16,745	1.31		18,376	1.44		
Total votes	1,273,443	100.00		1,273,761	100.00		
Registered voters/turnout	2,239,966	56.85		2,239,966	56.87		

=== By-elections (August 2016–November 2021) ===
The following by-elections were held to fill vacant ward seats in the period between the elections in August 2016 and November 2021.

Date	Ward	Party of the previous councillor	Party of the newly elected councillor
5 April 2017	73	Democratic Alliance	Democratic Alliance
23 August 2017	124	African National Congress	African National Congress
28 February 2018	14	African National Congress	African National Congress
25 April 2018	72	Democratic Alliance	Democratic Alliance
25 April 2018	88	Democratic Alliance	Democratic Alliance
25 April 2018	92	African National Congress	African National Congress
23 May 2018	85	Democratic Alliance	Democratic Alliance
10 April 2019	50	African National Congress	African National Congress
10 April 2019	122	African National Congress	African National Congress
24 July 2019	54	Democratic Alliance	Democratic Alliance
24 July 2019	83	Democratic Alliance	Democratic Alliance
24 July 2019	109	Democratic Alliance	African National Congress
24 July 2019	112	Democratic Alliance	Democratic Alliance
11 November 2020 (Note: By-election was delayed due to the COVID-19 pandemic.)	9	Democratic Alliance	Al Jama-ah
11 November 2020	41	African National Congress	African National Congress
11 November 2020	68	Democratic Alliance	Patriotic Alliance
11 November 2020	120	Democratic Alliance	African National Congress
11 November 2020	130	African National Congress	African National Congress
19 May 2021	7	Democratic Alliance	African National Congress
19 May 2021	17	Democratic Alliance	Patriotic Alliance
19 May 2021	18	Democratic Alliance	Patriotic Alliance
19 May 2021	23	Democratic Alliance	Democratic Alliance

By the end of the term of the council, the changes in ward seats meant that the party composition was as follows.

Party	Seats		
Party	Ward	List	Total
African National Congress	87	37	124
Democratic Alliance	44	53	97
Economic Freedom Fighters	0	30	30
Inkatha Freedom Party	0	5	5
African Independent Congress	0	4	4
Patriotic Alliance	3	1	4
Al Jama-ah	1	1	2
Freedom Front Plus	0	1	1
African Christian Democratic Party	0	1	1
United Democratic Movement	0	1	1
Congress of the People	0	1	1
Total	135	135	270

== November 2021 ==
The following table shows the results of the 2021 election.

Party	Ward			List			Total seats
Party	Votes	%	Seats	Votes	%	Seats	Total seats
African National Congress	313,387	33.97	87	306,902	33.22	4	91
Democratic Alliance	247,533	26.83	43	235,120	25.45	28	71
ActionSA	128,986	13.98	0	167,359	18.12	44	44
Economic Freedom Fighters	102,751	11.14	0	93,412	10.11	29	29
Patriotic Alliance	26,830	2.91	2	27,346	2.96	6	8
Inkatha Freedom Party	21,743	2.36	2	21,801	2.36	5	7
Freedom Front Plus	12,428	1.35	0	12,243	1.33	4	4
African Christian Democratic Party	9,999	1.08	0	9,469	1.03	3	3
Al Jama-ah	9,961	1.08	1	7,647	0.83	2	3
Independent candidates	11,904	1.29	0				0
African Independent Congress	4,619	0.50	0	6,341	0.69	2	2
African Heart Congress	4,341	0.47	0	3,938	0.43	1	1
Good	3,684	0.40	0	3,089	0.33	1	1
African Transformation Movement	3,660	0.40	0	2,974	0.32	1	1
United Democratic Movement	2,291	0.25	0	2,218	0.24	1	1
Congress of the People	2,297	0.25	0	1,779	0.19	1	1
Pan Africanist Congress of Azania	1,512	0.16	0	2,467	0.27	1	1
United Independent Movement	1,263	0.14	0	1,162	0.13	1	1
African People's Convention	1,212	0.13	0	1,065	0.12	1	1
Defenders of the People	1,079	0.12	0	1,134	0.12	0	0
Party of Action	899	0.10	0	1,178	0.13	0	0
Black First Land First	834	0.09	0	1,103	0.12	0	0
Azanian People's Organisation	925	0.10	0	742	0.08	0	0
Abantu Batho Congress	456	0.05	0	1,162	0.13	0	0
National Freedom Party	552	0.06	0	1,017	0.11	0	0
African Ambassadors of South Africa	849	0.09	0	703	0.08	0	0
International Revelation Congress	267	0.03	0	824	0.09	0	0
Africa Restoration Alliance	710	0.08	0	377	0.04	0	0
Change	673	0.07	0	351	0.04	0	0
The Organic Humanity Movement	605	0.07	0	393	0.04	0	0
Justice and Employment Party	465	0.05	0	491	0.05	0	0
Economic Emancipation Forum	604	0.07	0	347	0.04	0	0
Agang South Africa				763	0.08	0	0
Activists Movement of South Africa	234	0.03	0	495	0.05	0	0
National People's Front	247	0.03	0	422	0.05	0	0
Us the People	144	0.02	0	519	0.06	0	0
Abahlaly Baahi	202	0.02	0	419	0.05	0	0
African Security Congress	30	0.00	0	582	0.06	0	0
Bolsheviks Party of South Africa	325	0.04	0	285	0.03	0	0
African People's Movement	141	0.02	0	437	0.05	0	0
Democratic Artists Party	17	0.00	0	554	0.06	0	0
People's Freedom Party	41	0.00	0	509	0.06	0	0
South African Royal Kingdoms Organization	224	0.02	0	288	0.03	0	0
Forum for Service Delivery	197	0.02	0	307	0.03	0	0
Shosholoza Progressive Party	348	0.04	0	150	0.02	0	0
Amalgamated Rainbow Movement	195	0.02	0	252	0.03	0	0
Disrupt Party	279	0.03	0	152	0.02	0	0
Royal Loyal Progress	281	0.03	0	147	0.02	0	0
Community Solidarity Association	40	0.00	0	242	0.03	0	0
African Freedom Revolution	7	0.00	0	224	0.02	0	0
Agency for New Agenda				221	0.02	0	0
Civic Movement of South Africa	59	0.01	0	151	0.02	0	0
United Cultural Movement	56	0.01	0	149	0.02	0	0
International Party	0	0.00	0	188	0.02	0	0
Black and White Party	54	0.01	0	114	0.01	0	0
Sakhisizwe Convention	24	0.00	0				0
African Covenant	1	0.00	0				0
Total	922,465	100.00	135	923,724	100.00	135	270
Valid votes	922,465	98.78		923,724	98.72		
Invalid/blank votes	11,432	1.22		11,975	1.28		
Total votes	933,897	100.00		935,699	100.00		
Registered voters/turnout	2,220,710	42.05		2,220,710	42.14		

=== By-elections (November 2021–present) ===
The following by-elections were held to fill vacant ward seats in the period from the election in November 2021.

Date	Ward	Party of the previous councillor	Party of the newly elected councillor
31 May 2022	53	African National Congress	African National Congress
28 Jun 2023	7	African National Congress	Patriotic Alliance
23 Aug 2023	102	Democratic Alliance	Democratic Alliance
28 Aug 2024	87	Democratic Alliance	Democratic Alliance
28 Aug 2024	89	Democratic Alliance	Democratic Alliance
11 Sep 2024	9	Al Jama-ah	Al Jama-ah
11 Sep 2024	21	African National Congress	African National Congress
19 Mar 2025	59	African National Congress	African National Congress
2 Apr 2025	82	Democratic Alliance	Patriotic Alliance
2 Apr 2025	99	Democratic Alliance	Democratic Alliance
14 May 2025	24	African National Congress	African National Congress
10 Sep 2025	130	African National Congress	African National Congress
15 Oct 2025	29	African National Congress	Patriotic Alliance
26 Nov 2025	90	Democratic Alliance	Democratic Alliance
25 Feb 2026	102	Democratic Alliance	Democratic Alliance

== November 2026 ==
The following table shows the results of the 2026 election.

Party	Ward			List			Total seats
Party	Votes	%	Seats	Votes	%	Seats	Total seats
Democratic Alliance	436,710	35.03	51	431,111	34.63	40	91
African National Congress	250,079	20.06	64	253,961	20.40	0	64
ActionSA	188,697	15.14	9	216,504	17.39	33	42
Economic Freedom Fighters	81,496	6.54	2	81,120	6.52	15	17
uMkhonto weSizwe Party	69,579	5.58	1	69,301	5.57	14	15
Inkatha Freedom Party	30,966	2.48	4	30,513	2.45	3	7
Patriotic Alliance	27,327	2.19	2	22,460	1.80	3	5
Freedom Front Plus	21,966	1.76	0	23,704	1.90	5	5
Rise Mzansi	23,596	1.89	0	20,769	1.67	5	5
African Transformation Movement	12,409	1.00	0	13,958	1.12	3	3
Al Jama-ah	13,224	1.06	2	10,858	0.87	1	3
South African Communist Party	9,285	0.74	0	7,268	0.58	2	2
African Christian Democratic Party	7,321	0.59	0	8,297	0.67	2	2
Afrika Mayibuye Movement	7,951	0.64	0	6,271	0.50	2	2
African Independent Congress	7,185	0.58	0	3,509	0.28	1	1
Build One South Africa	5,626	0.45	0	4,984	0.40	1	1
Independent candidates	10,172	0.82	0				0
People's Movement for Change	3,527	0.28	0	3,467	0.28	1	1
Pan Africanist Congress of Azania	3,017	0.24	0	2,548	0.20	1	1
Economic Liberators Forum South Africa	2,996	0.24	0	2,431	0.20	1	1
African People's Convention	2,513	0.20	0	2,071	0.17	1	1
African Heart Congress	2,052	0.16	0	1,843	0.15	1	1
People of Joburg	1,806	0.14	0	1,342	0.11	0	0
United Africans Transformation	1,195	0.10	0	1,815	0.15	0	0
Congress of the People	1,424	0.11	0	1,295	0.10	0	0
United Democratic Movement	2,698	0.22	0				0
Combat	1,395	0.11	0	1,279	0.10	0	0
Umphakathi Warona	943	0.08	0	1,325	0.11	0	0
South African People's Civic Organization	1,257	0.10	0	897	0.07	0	0
Truth and Solidarity Movement	1,196	0.10	0	828	0.07	0	0
African Congress for Transformation	944	0.08	0	1,020	0.08	0	0
Move SA	991	0.08	0	855	0.07	0	0
Community First Movement	896	0.07	0	874	0.07	0	0
Mawusa Movement Party	863	0.07	0	904	0.07	0	0
Azanian People's Organisation	758	0.06	0	712	0.06	0	0
African Unemployed Congress	773	0.06	0	683	0.05	0	0
All Citizens Party	700	0.06	0	714	0.06	0	0
Imstaying	711	0.06	0	568	0.05	0	0
Allied Independents Umbrella	771	0.06	0	483	0.04	0	0
Know Your Power	555	0.04	0	365	0.03	0	0
Economic Emancipation Forum	362	0.03	0	522	0.04	0	0
Active African Christians United Movement	374	0.03	0	472	0.04	0	0
Gaza Democratic Front	252	0.02	0	578	0.05	0	0
African Labour Convention	239	0.02	0	586	0.05	0	0
African Economic Freedom	297	0.02	0	520	0.04	0	0
Minority Front	481	0.04	0	316	0.03	0	0
African Renaissance Unity	339	0.03	0	445	0.04	0	0
National Freedom Party	274	0.02	0	471	0.04	0	0
Africa Restoration Alliance	309	0.02	0	427	0.03	0	0
Freedom in South Africa	298	0.02	0	433	0.03	0	0
African Royal Rainbow Congress	302	0.02	0	411	0.03	0	0
Azania Peaceful Revolution	427	0.03	0	282	0.02	0	0
Economic Redress Movement	390	0.03	0	296	0.02	0	0
National Coloured Congress	372	0.03	0	294	0.02	0	0
Vuka SA	268	0.02	0	388	0.03	0	0
Independent Citizens Movement	284	0.02	0	366	0.03	0	0
Land Party	20	0.00	0	602	0.05	0	0
Service Delivery Party	385	0.03	0	219	0.02	0	0
Labour Party	380	0.03	0	219	0.02	0	0
Movement of Residents Party	125	0.01	0	429	0.03	0	0
International Revelation Congress	185	0.01	0	359	0.03	0	0
Operation Dudula	106	0.01	0	429	0.03	0	0
Organic Humanity Movement	289	0.02	0	231	0.02	0	0
United Independent Movement	240	0.02	0	246	0.02	0	0
Ekhethu Peoples Party	226	0.02	0	220	0.02	0	0
Bolsheviks Party of South Africa	159	0.01	0	265	0.02	0	0
Change Party				370	0.03	0	0
Shosholoza Progressive Party	248	0.02	0	118	0.01	0	0
Azanian Ground Forces	243	0.02	0	122	0.01	0	0
Amalgamated Rainbow Movement	142	0.01	0	195	0.02	0	0
All Natives of South Africa	204	0.02	0	109	0.01	0	0
Gap Fixers of South Africa	116	0.01	0	153	0.01	0	0
Pro South Africa				250	0.02	0	0
People's Consent Party	4	0.00	0	239	0.02	0	0
National Democratic Convention	165	0.01	0	76	0.01	0	0
Christ Kingdom Party	15	0.00	0	212	0.02	0	0
Kingdom Covenant Democratic Party	52	0.00	0	148	0.01	0	0
Civic Movement for Progressive Citizens	198	0.02	0				0
Ilizwe Nathi	49	0.00	0	91	0.01	0	0
Tau Dia Rora Cultural and Traditional Lekgotla	114	0.01	0				0
Lekwe Bepe Kingdom Party	6	0.00	0	69	0.01	0	0
Resident Development	44	0.00	0				0
Afrika Unite Congress	11	0.00	0				0
Total	1,246,564	100.00	135	1,245,085	100.00	135	270
Valid votes	1,246,564	98.49		1,245,085	98.63		
Invalid/blank votes	19,150	1.51		17,316	1.37		
Total votes	1,265,714	100.00		1,262,401	100.00		
Registered voters/turnout	2,417,915	52.35		2,417,915	52.21		
