= Mpho (given name) =

Mpho is a given name. Notable people with the name include:

- Mpho, South African-born singer-songwriter
- Mpho Balopi, Motswana politician
- Mpho Kgaswane (born 1994), Motswana footballer
- Mpho Koaho, Canadian actor
- Mpho Lekgoro (born 1964 or 1965), South African politician
- Mpho Links (born 1996), South African high jumper
- Mpho Mabogo (born 1980), Motswana footballer
- Mpho Madi (born 1988), South African wrestler
- Mpho Makola (born 1986), South African footballer
- Mpho Matsi (born 1990), South African footballer
- Mpho Mbebe (born 1992), South African footballer
- Mpho Mbiyozo (born 1983), South African rugby union player
- Mpho Modise (born 1980), South African politician
- Mpho Moerane (1969–2022), South African politician
- Mpho Moloi (born 1983), South African footballer
- Mpho Morobe (born 1966), Lesotho sprinter
- Mpho Motlhabane, South African politician
- Mpho Ndumo (born 1997), South African cricketer
- Mpho Osei Tutu (born 1981), French-born South African actor
- Mpho Phalatse (born 1977), South African physician and politician
- Mpho Tshivhase, South African philosopher
- Mpho Tutu van Furth (born 1963), South African author and priest

== See also ==
- Motsamai Mpho (1921–2012), Motswana activist and politician
