= Imraan Moosa =

South African politician

Imraan Moosa MP

Member of the National Assembly of South Africa
- Incumbent
- Assumed office 17 June 2025
- Preceded by: Shameemah Salie

Personal details
- Born: Imraan Ismail-Moosa; 15 June 1961 (age 64) Lenasia, Johannesburg, Transvaal Province, South Africa
- Party: Al Jama-ah
- Occupation: Member of Parliament
- Profession: Politician

Imraan Ismail-Moosa (born 15 June 1961) is a South African politician who has been a Member of the National Assembly of South Africa since June 2025, representing Al Jama-ah, an Islamist party in South Africa. He had previously served as a ward councillor in the City of Johannesburg.

== Background ==
Moosa was born on 15 June 1961 in Lenasia, south of Johannesburg. He attended Park Primary School and matriculated from Trinity High School where he served as chairperson of the school's student representative council.

== Political career ==
Moosa was elected as the ward councillor for ward 9 in the City of Johannesburg Metropolitan Municipality in a by-election in November 2020, becoming Al Jama-ah's first ward councillor in South Africa. He was re-elected to a full term as ward councillor during the 2021 local government elections. Moosa was elected to the National Assembly of South Africa in the 2024 general election, however, the party decided not to appoint him to the National Assembly immediately because he chaired the City of Johannesburg's Environmental Infrastructure and Services Department Committee.

Moosa later resigned as the ward councillor for ward 9 and was appointed to head the party's national parliamentary office.

Moosa was sworn in as a Member of the National Assembly on 17 June 2025, replacing Shameemah Salie, who had stood in for him. He was announced as the party's parliamentary leader on 22 June 2025.
