= Christian Front =

Christian Front may refer to:

- Christian Front (South Africa)
- Christian Front (United States)
- Indian Christian Front
- Irish Christian Front, founded in 1936
- Christian Democratic Front, São Tomé and Príncipe
- Christian Democratic Popular Front, Moldova
- Christian World Liberation Front, known as the Spiritual Counterfeits Project
