= Dada Morero =

South African politician

Councillor Dada Morero
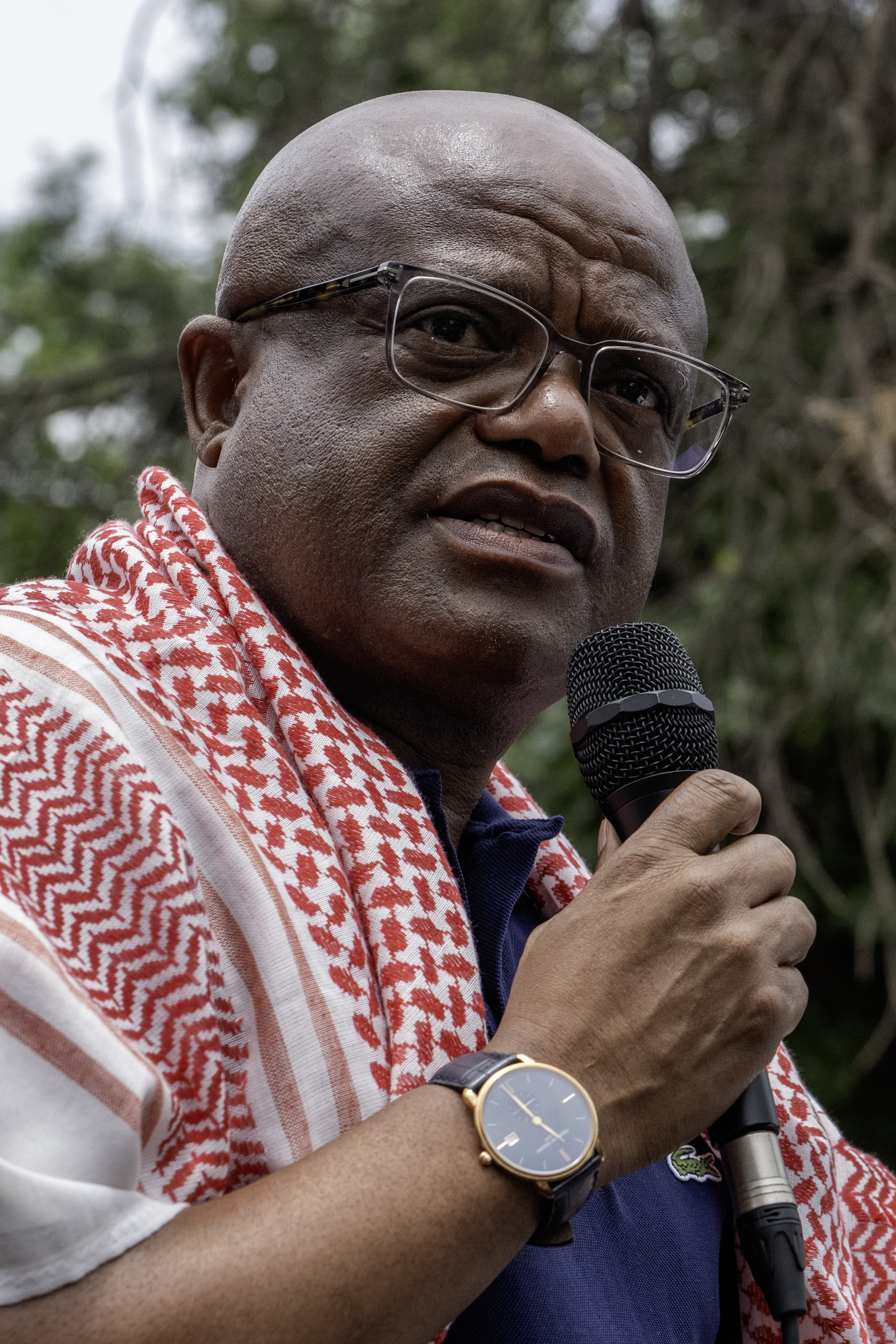
- Dada Morero addresses protestors at a water crisis protest in 2025

Mayor of Johannesburg
- Incumbent
- Assumed office 16 August 2024
- Preceded by: Kabelo Gwamanda
- In office Disputed: 30 September 2022 – 25 October 2022
- Preceded by: Mpho Phalatse
- Succeeded by: Mpho Phalatse

Member of the Mayoral Committee for Finance of Johannesburg
- In office 2 February 2023 – 16 August 2024
- Mayor: Thapelo Amad; Kabelo Gwamanda

Regional Chairperson of the African National Congress in Johannesburg
- Incumbent
- Assumed office 5 June 2022

Personal details
- Born: Sello Enoch Dada Morero Soweto
- Party: African National Congress
- Children: Tshiamo and Bafaletso Morero

Sello Enoch Dada Morero is a South African politician who has been the Mayor of Johannesburg since 16 August 2024, a position which he previously held for 25 days, from 30 September 2022 until 25 October 2022 when the erstwhile Mayor, Mpho Phalatse, was reinstated through the courts. Morero is the regional chairperson of the African National Congress in Johannesburg.

== Political career ==
Morero is a former COSAS (Congress of the South African Students) student leader. He had previously served for two terms as the regional secretary of the African National Congress in Johannesburg. On 5 June 2022, Morero defeated deputy regional chairperson Eunice Mgcina to become the next regional chairperson of the ANC, winning with 153 votes to Mgcina's 143 votes.

== Mayor of Johannesburg ==
Following the implosion of the DA-led coalition government in the City of Johannesburg and the subsequent removal of DA mayor Mpho Phalatse in a vote of no confidence, Morero was elected mayor on 30 September 2022. He was elected with the help of the DA's former coalition partners, the Patriotic Alliance and the Congress of the People. He was sworn into office the following day. On 25 October 2022, the South Gauteng High Court ruled that his election as mayor was unlawful, reinstating Phalatse as mayor with immediate effect.

Phalatse was eventually voted out as mayor in January 2023 and replaced with Thapelo Amad of the Al Jama-ah party; Morero was appointed Member of the Mayoral Committee for Finance by Amad. Amad later resigned as mayor in April 2023 and was replaced with fellow Al Jama-ah councillor Kabelo Gwamanda the following month; Morero remained as MMC for Finance.

On 21 August 2023, ANC president and President of South Africa Cyril Ramaphosa said during a speech at an ANC event in Gauteng that Morero should be mayor of the metro again.

On 16 August 2024, Morero was elected to a second, non-consecutive, term as Johannesburg mayor, replacing Kabelo Gwamanda.

=== Service delivery and infrastructure ===
In November 2024, Morero made a walkabout to identify inner-city problems in Doornfontein. Morero identified a number of problems Johannesburg residents were faced with. Morero stated that he along with members of his mayoral council would do walkabouts on a monthly basis to reclaim the city. Johannesburg had for a number of years been on a downward spiral regarding service delivery and crumbling infrastructure, with residents protesting over the lack of service delivery. To address some of the city's infrastructure and service delivery issues, Morero along with the Premier of Gauteng, Panyaza Lesufi, led the Accelerated Service Delivery initiative in Soweto. The initiative aimed to tackle some of the city's most critical service delivery issues.

Since the beginning of 2024, the City of Johannesburg had been facing a severe water crisis, which Morero attributed to drought, high levels of non-revenue water, illegal connections, and infrastructure problems. In November 2024, a number of areas in Johannesburg had prolonged water shortages for up to a week. In response, municipal entity, Johannesburg Water executives outlined measures to address the water challenges by scheduling water restrictions, maintaining of pipelines and enforcement of city bylaws to combat illegal water connections. The water restrictions resulted in protests around the city. Morero stated the city would unveil the ‘Vikela Amanzi, Protect our Tomorrow’ campaign to confront water supply challenges. Morero blamed the previous Democratic Alliance coalition government for wasteful expenditure of R24.4 billion rand, while finance minister Enoch Godongwana demanded that the city turn its woeful financial condition around or face intervention.
