= Mpho Phalatse =

South African medical doctor and former Mayor of Johannesburg

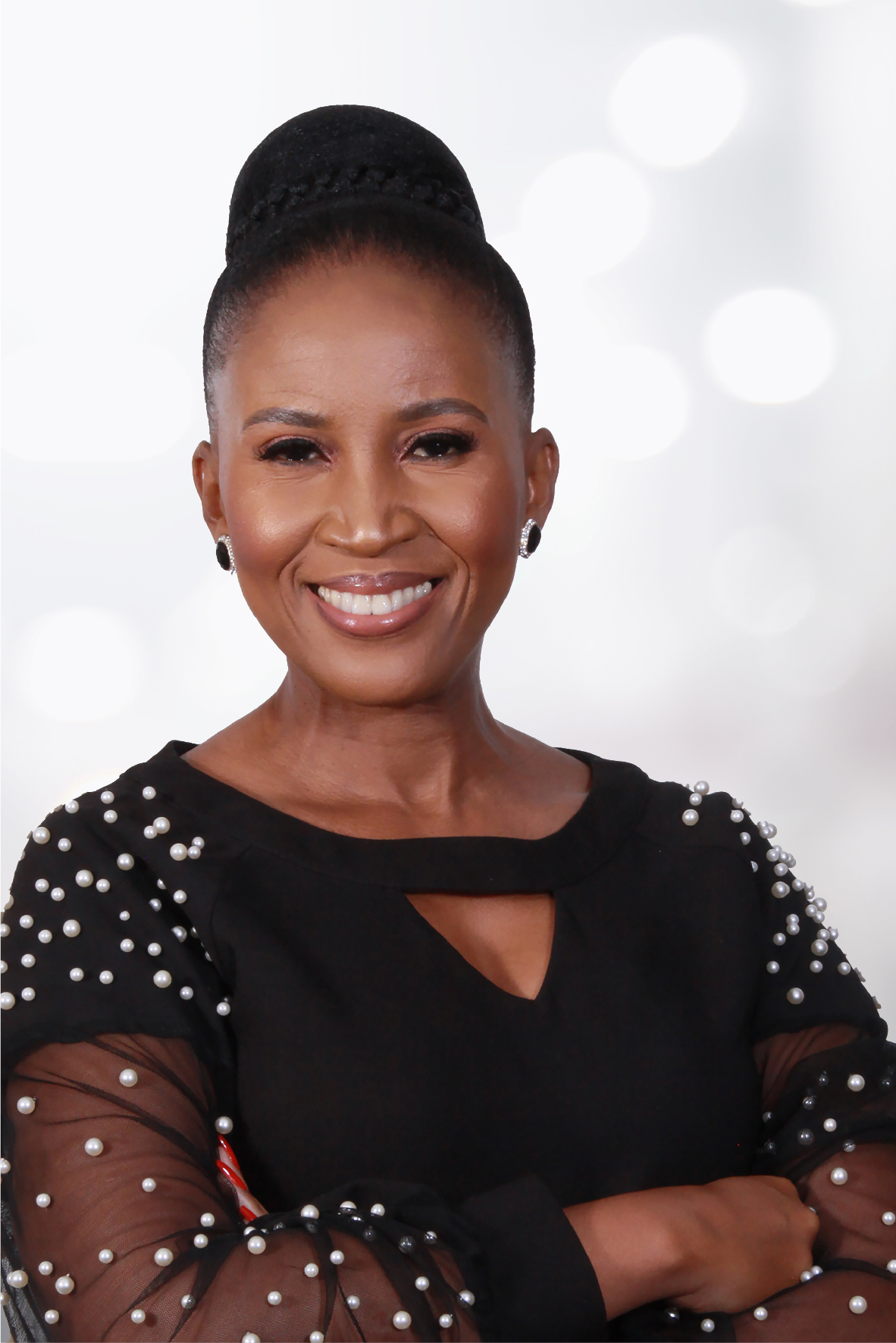
- Phalatse in 2021

Mayor of Johannesburg
- In office 26 October 2022 – 26 January 2023
- Preceded by: Dada Morero (disputed)
- Succeeded by: Thapelo Amad
- In office 22 November 2021 – 30 September 2022
- Preceded by: Mpho Moerane
- Succeeded by: Dada Morero (disputed)

Member of the Mayoral Committee for Health and Social Development of Johannesburg
- In office 26 August 2016 – 27 November 2019
- Mayor: Herman Mashaba

Member of the Johannesburg City Council
- In office 22 August 2016 – 30 September 2023

Personal details
- Born: Mpho Louisa Phalatse; 7 November 1977 (age 48) Pretoria, Transvaal Province, South Africa
- Party: Democratic Alliance
- Spouse(s): Brutus Malada (m. 2022; div. 2024) Reggie Nxumalo (m. 2024)
- Children: 3
- Education: MEDUNSA (MBChB)
- Occupation: Medical doctor; politician

Mpho Louisa Phalatse (born 7 November 1977) is a South African medical doctor and politician who was the Executive Mayor of the City of Johannesburg Metropolitan Municipality. A member of the Democratic Alliance, she served in the position from 22 November 2021 until her ousting in a motion of no-confidence on 26 January 2023. She is the first woman to serve as mayor of the metropolitan municipality, which was established in 2000. She is the first black woman to serve as mayor of the city of Johannesburg and only the second female mayor of the city after Jessie McPherson, who served from 1945 to 1946.

From 2016 to 2019, Phalatse had served as the member of the mayoral committee (MMC) in Johannesburg for Health and Social Development.

== Early life and career ==
Phalatse was born on 7 November 1977 in Hebron, Pretoria. She lived with her grandmother in Hebron for the first few years of her life before she joined her parents in Mabopane. They were both educators. Phalatse matriculated in 1994. The following year, she enrolled at the University of the Witwatersrand to study chemical engineering. During her second year at Wits University, Phalatse decided that she wanted to become a medical doctor and enrolled at the MEDUNSA (now known as the Sefako Makgatho Health Sciences University), from which she graduated with an MBChB. She became a doctor in 2005 and interned at Tembisa Hospital. She then did community service in Hammanskraal before she began working at the Jubilee Hospital.

Phalatse began studying project management studies at the Cranefield College during her community service year. She later achieved an advanced diploma and postgraduate diploma in project management and programme management. In 2011, she enrolled for a Master of Medicine at Wits University.

Phalatse is a Certified Independent Medical Examiner (CIME) with the American Board of Independent Medical Examiners (ABIME). She was a casualty officer at the Alexandra Community Health Centre as well as sexual assault care practitioner at the Far East Rand Hospital, while she was a member of the Professional Conduct Committee of the Health Professions Council of South Africa.

== Early political career ==
Phalatse joined the Democratic Alliance and was elected to the Johannesburg City Council in 2016. Newly elected mayor Herman Mashaba appointed Phalatse as the member of the mayoral committee for Health and Social Development.

On 12 June 2018, Mashaba suspended her after she said that the "city [Johannesburg] and herself were now friends of Israel". She was reinstated on 26 June. Phalatse served in the Mayoral Committee until Mashaba resigned as mayor in November 2019.

== Mayor of Johannesburg ==
On 23 August 2021, DA leader John Steenhuisen announced that Phalatse had been selected as the DA's mayoral candidate for the City of Johannesburg for the local government elections on 1 November 2021. No party won a majority of seats again and the DA's support in the city declined by nearly 12% in the election.

At the first council meeting on 22 November 2021, Phalatse was elected as the Executive Mayor of the Johannesburg Metropolitan Municipality. She received 144 out of the 265 votes in the mayoral vote in council, defeating the ANC's candidate, incumbent mayor Mpho Moerane, who received only 121 votes. Phalatse was elected with the help of smaller parties, such as the Economic Freedom Fighters, the Freedom Front Plus and ActionSA. She is the first woman to serve as mayor of the metropolitan municipality (established in 2000), the first black female mayor of Johannesburg and the second woman after Jessie McPherson who served from 1945 to 1946.

On 26 November 2021, Phalatse issued a moratorium on the filling of vacant positions and the extension of employment contracts in the City of Johannesburg. During Phalatse's acceptance speech as mayor on 3 December 2021, ANC councillors disrupted it and demanded that she retract previous comments she made in support of Israel. Phalatse did not give in to their demands.

On 13 December 2021, Phalatse announced the formation of her ten-member multi-party mayoral committee. The DA secured only four portfolios on the mayoral committee, while ActionSA secured three portfolios. The African Christian Democratic Party, the Inkatha Freedom Party and the Freedom Front Plus secured one portfolio each. Phalatse said that the DA had managed to form a ten-party majority coalition government with a total of 136 out of the 270 seats in council, an outright majority in council. In early-January 2022, Al Jama-ah withdrew from the coalition agreement due to the DA's support for Israel. This caused the coalition to lose its majority status in council. On 17 January 2022, the Patriotic Alliance caucus leader in the City of Johannesburg, Ashley Sauls, announced that the party had entered into a power-sharing agreement with the DA in the metro. The coalition government now had 140 seats, more than an outright majority of seats in council. In February 2022, Sauls was sworn in as the Member of the Mayoral Committee (MMC) for Health and Social Development, replacing Franco de Lange of the Freedom Front Plus who had voluntarily resigned to make way for Sauls to join the mayoral committee.

On 17 January 2022, Phalatse and Giuseppe Sala, the Mayor of Milan, were elected as Vice Chairs of the C40 Steering Committee, the governing body providing tactical direction for the network of 97 cities dedicated to solving the global climate crisis.

On 31 August 2022, DA councillor Vasco da Gama was removed as council speaker in a vote of no confidence that went 136–132, despite the coalition holding a majority of seats in council. Rogue councillors from the DA's coalition partners, such as the Inkatha Freedom Party, the African Christian Democratic Party, the Congress of the People and the United Independent Movement, defied their parties' instructions and voted for da Gama's removal. They all subsequently faced repercussions or were expelled. There was division between coalition partners over who would replace da Gama with ActionSA wanting an IFP councillor to replace da Gama.

On 28 September 2022, COPE councillor Colleen Makhubele was elected speaker with the help of the ANC-led bloc over the DA's Alex Christians after the Patriotic Alliance, a member of the DA-led coalition, had voted against Christians. The PA subsequently resigned from the coalition and joined the ANC-led bloc after the DA refused to reconfigure the coalition agreement. Makhubele then called a special council meeting for 30 September for the vote of no confidence which had been tabled against Phalatse by the Pan Africanist Congress of Azania weeks ago over service delivery issues, to be held. Phalatse approached the High Court in Johannesburg in order to prevent the special sitting of council from taking place and for the court to declare programming committee's decision to call a special council meeting unlawful, because the meeting did not quorate hence the decision to convene the special sitting of council was invalid. On 30 September 2022, Phalatse was voted out as mayor and the High Court struck her case off the roll. The ANC's Dada Morero was elected to replace her.

On 25 October 2022, the Johannesburg High Court ruled that both the council speaker's decision to hold a motion of no confidence against Phalatse and the election of Dada Morero were unlawful, unconstitutional and invalid and Phalatse was subsequently reinstated as mayor.

On 26 January 2023, Phalatse was ousted as mayor for a second time during a motion of no confidence with 140 votes supporting the motion to 129 votes against the motion during the Johannesburg City Council Meeting.

== Post-mayoral career ==
After Phalatse was removed as mayor for a second time, it was speculated that she would launch a campaign for federal leader of the DA ahead of the party's federal congress in April 2023. She launched her campaign on 30 January 2023 at the Hector Peterson Memorial in Soweto. Phalatse said that her work as a technocrat and leading the multi-party coalition in Johannesburg had "sufficiently prepared" her for the position. Despite being popular in the DA, party insiders said that she launched her campaign for leader too late and that Steenhuisen has an advantage as a popular party leader who had won significant support for his re-election campaign. She lost to Steenhuisen at party's Federal Congress.

On 5 June 2023, Belinda Kayser-Echeozonjoku was elected leader of the DA caucus in the city council unopposed after Phalatse withdrew from the race.

Phalatse announced on 28 August 2023 that she would resign as a DA councillor on 30 September 2023 and return to being a medical doctor.

== Personal life ==
Phalatse has three children.

In December 2022, Phalatse married ActionSA member Brutus Malada.
