= Jolidee Matongo =

South African politician (1975–2021)

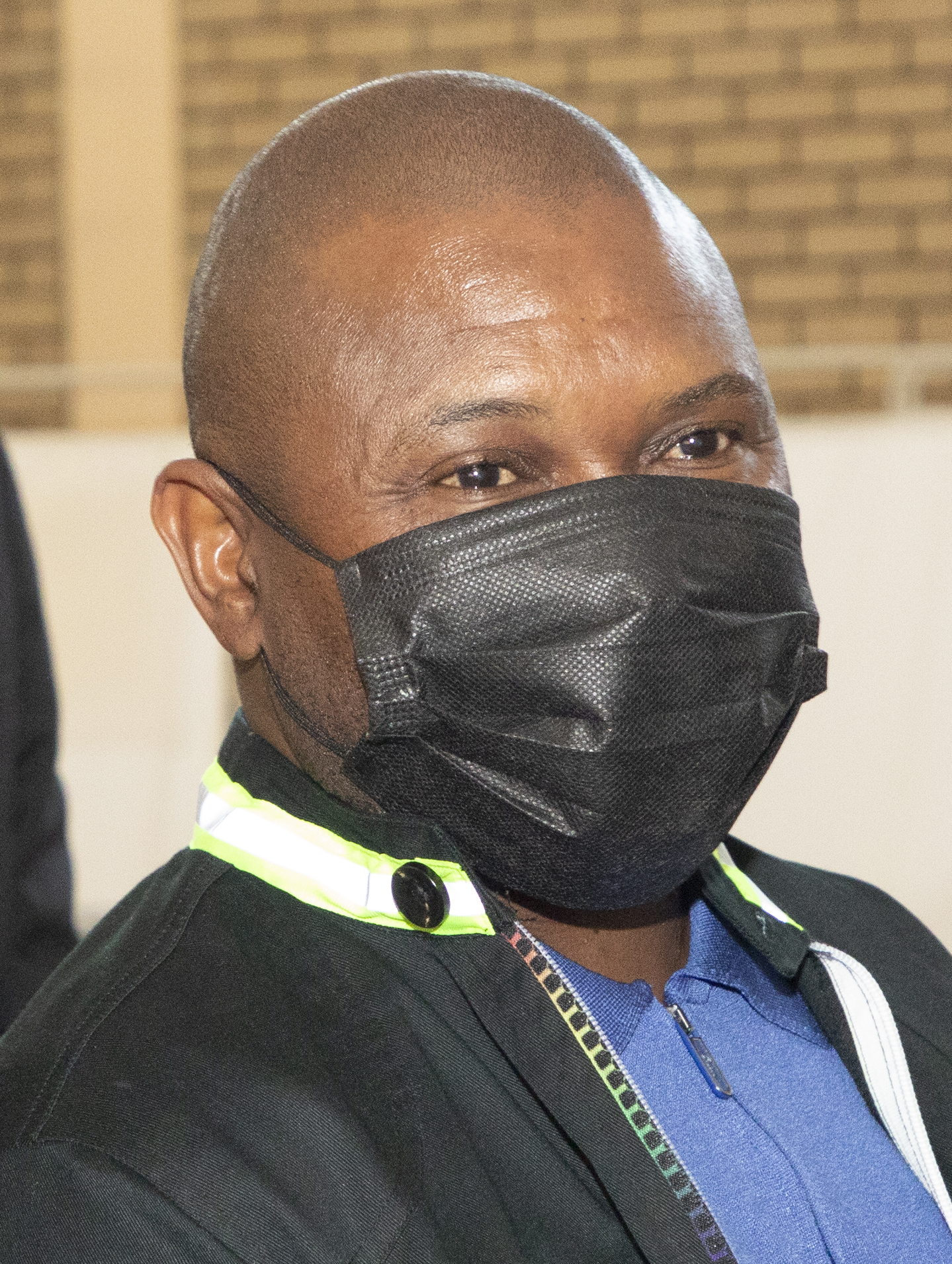
- Matongo in 2021

Mayor of Johannesburg
- In office 10 August 2021 – 18 September 2021
- Preceded by: Geoff Makhubo
- Succeeded by: Mpho Moerane

Personal details
- Born: 1974 Soweto, Transvaal Province, South Africa
- Died: 18 September 2021 (aged 45–46) Soweto, Gauteng, South Africa
- Cause of death: Car accident
- Party: African National Congress
- Education: University of South Africa; Milpark Education

Jolidee Matongo (1974 – 18 September 2021) was a South African politician who served as the mayor of Johannesburg from 10 August 2021 until his death on 18 September 2021. Prior to his election as mayor, he served as the member of the mayoral committee (MMC) for finance under his predecessor, Geoff Makhubo, who died from COVID-19 complications. Matongo was a member of the African National Congress.

== Personal life ==
Matongo was born in Soweto, south of Johannesburg, his father was a Zimbabwean migrant. He held a diploma in public management, a B-Tech degree in public management from the University of South Africa, and a post-graduate diploma in management from Milpark Education. At the time of his death, he was studying for a master's degree in public management through the Management College of Southern Africa. Matongo lived with his family in Lenasia.

== Political career ==
Matongo became involved in politics at the age of 13. He was a member of the Soweto Student Congress and the Congress of South African Students (COSAS) before he became the regional head of communications of the African National Congress for eight years. Matongo worked for the City of Johannesburg's housing department before he became deputy director of youth development in the municipality.

Matongo was also chief of staff for multiple Gauteng Members of the Executive Council. In 2011, he was appointed a strategic support advisor in the office of the Member of the Mayoral Committee (MMC) for Finance. He was a member of the ANC's regional executive committee (REC) in Johannesburg for 18 years where he served as spokesperson.

Matongo was appointed MMC for Finance following Geoff Makhubo's election as mayor in December 2019, replacing the Democratic Alliance's Funzela Ngobeni, who was defeated by Makhubo in the race for mayor. In July 2020, Matongo denied allegations of political motivation for removing members of the city's organisations. In April 2021, he announced a new debt rehabilitation programme for people affected by the COVID-19 pandemic and struggling to pay their mortgages. In May, Matongo promised increased spending on the townships and informal settlements of Ivory Park, Kliptown and Orange Farm, and gave 19.9 billion rand to the City Power company for infrastructure improvement.

== Mayor of Johannesburg ==
Geoff Makhubo died from COVID-19 complications in July 2021. On 3 August 2021, Matongo was one of three candidates whose names were submitted to the ANC provincial executive committee and the ANC national executive committee by the ANC's regional executive committee to replace Makhubo as mayor. He was considered the frontrunner. On 5 August he was formally endorsed by the ANC's national leadership.

Matongo was elected mayor unopposed on 10 August 2021 as he was the only candidate nominated for the position.

== Death ==
Matongo was killed in a car accident on 18 September 2021. He had been travelling on the R553 route (also known as The Golden Highway), and two other people were killed in the crash. He had served as mayor for slightly more than a month. Earlier that day, he had campaigned in Soweto with President Cyril Ramaphosa and Gauteng Premier David Makhura ahead of the municipal elections scheduled for 1 November 2021. His funeral was held on 21 September.
