= North Champagne Estates =

- Location within Gauteng Location within South Africa
- Coordinates: 25.975°S 27.959°E
- Country: South Africa
- Province: Gauteng
- Municipality: City of Johannesburg
- Main Place: Chartwell

Area
  - Total: 0.57 km^{2} (0.22 sq mi)

Population (2011)
  - Total: 75
  - Density: 130/km^{2} (340/sq mi)

Racial makeup (2011)
  - Black African: 52.0%
  - Indian/Asian: 1.3%
  - White: 41.3%
  - Other: 5.3%

First languages (2011)
  - English: 39.2%
  - Tswana: 20.3%
  - Afrikaans: 9.5%
  - Southern Ndebele: 8.1%
  - Other: 23.0%
- Time zone: UTC+2 (SAST)

North Champayne Estates is a suburb of Johannesburg, South Africa. It is located in Region A of the City of Johannesburg Metropolitan Municipality.
