= Chartwell, Gauteng =

Chartwell
- Location within Gauteng Location within South Africa
- Coordinates: 25.9826°S 27.9693°E
- Country: South Africa
- Province: Gauteng
- Municipality: City of Johannesburg

Area
  - Total: 9.07 km^{2} (3.50 sq mi)

Population (2011)
  - Total: 1,728
  - Density: 191/km^{2} (493/sq mi)

Racial makeup (2011)
  - Black African: 42.5%
  - Coloured: 1.6%
  - Indian/Asian: 1.0%
  - White: 50.0%
  - Other: 5.0%

First languages (2011)
  - English: 50.5%
  - Afrikaans: 10.6%
  - Zulu: 9.7%
  - S. Ndebele: 7.2%
  - Other: 22.0%
- Time zone: UTC+2 (SAST)
- Postal code (street): 2191
- PO box: 2055

Chartwell Agricultural Holdings is a rural settlement in Gauteng, South Africa. It is located in Region A of the City of Johannesburg Metropolitan Municipality. Chartwell is mainly an agricultural suburb made up of small holdings. Chartwell AH is bisected by Cedar Avenue, which runs on the line of Sixth Road, Chartwell. This effectively divides Chartwell into North and South sections, known as Chartwell North Estates (CNE) and Chartwell Country Estates (CCE), respectively.

Farmall, a suburb of Chartwell AH, is also known as Chartwell West.

North Champagne Estates lies to the West of CNE, and Steyn City to the East. Farmall lies to the West of CCE, with Broadacres to the East and South
