= Shameemah Salie =

South African advocate and politician

Member of the National Assembly of South Africa
- In office 2 July 2024 – 5 June 2025
- Preceded by: Imraan Moosa
- Succeeded by: Imraan Moosa
- Constituency: National

Personal details
- Born: 1974 (age 51–52)
- Party: Al Jama-ah
- Spouse: Nathmi Salie
- Education: University of the Western Cape (B.Proc, LLB)
- Profession: Advocate

Shameemah Salie (née Dollie; born 1974) is a South African advocate and politician who served as a Member of the National Assembly of South Africa from July 2024 until June 2025, representing Al Jama-ah, of which she serves as national spokesperson. She previously served on the Cape Town City Council from 2021 until 2024.

== Early life and education ==
The youngest of six children, Salie was born in 1974 to Ebrahiem Dollie and Abeedah Mukaddam. The family first lived in the Bo-Kaap before moving to Bonteheuwel, then to Mitchells Plain in 1979 and then to Wynberg in 1987. Salie studied law at the University of the Western Cape, earning a B.Proc degree and then a Bachelor of Laws.

== Early political career ==
Salie is a member of Al Jama-ah, a party for upholding Muslim interests in South Africa. She serves as the party's national spokesperson. In May 2021, Salie was announced as the party's candidate for deputy mayor of the City of Cape Town ahead of the local government elections to be held later that year. While the Democratic Alliance retained control of the City of Cape Town, Salie was elected as a proportional representation councillor for Al Jama-ah, which won three seats.

== Controversies ==
In June 2023, Salie equated the high prevalence of rape and murder in South Africa to the LGBTQIA+ community, saying "We’re already living in Sodom and Gomorrah and you know that. The murders, the rapes, the LGBTQI+ community". As a result, Salie was named Mampara (buffoon) of the Week by the Sunday Times.

Salie was criticised by DA national spokesperson Solly Malatsi for remarks she made surrounding the involvement of LGBTQI+ members in a parliamentary process relating to new family policies during an interview with journalist Stephen Grootes on Newzroom Afrika.

== Parliamentary career ==
Al Jama-ah won two seats in the National Assembly during the 2024 national and provincial elections. The first seat was taken up by party leader Ganief Hendricks, however, the party decided against Johannesburg councillor Imraan Moosa taking up the second seat because he chairs the City of Johannesburg's Environment Infrastructure and Services committee. The party opted to choose Salie to take up his seat until May next year when he will be sworn in. Salie was sworn in as a Member of Parliament by speaker Thoko Didiza on 2 July 2024.

On 8 July 2024, Salie was nominated to serve on the Portfolio Committee on International Relations and Cooperation, the Portfolio Committee on Justice and Constitutional Development and the Portfolio Committee on Sports, Art and Culture.

Salie resigned from Parliament on 5 June 2025.

== Return to the Cape Town City Council ==
On 24 June 2024, Salie was sworn in as an Al Jama-ah councillor in the City of Cape Town.

== Personal life ==
Salie is married to Nathmi, and they have five children together.
