= Farmall, Gauteng =

Farmall
- Location within Gauteng Location within South Africa
- Coordinates: 25.9978°S 27.9544°E
- Country: South Africa
- Province: Gauteng
- Municipality: City of Johannesburg

Area
  - Total: 5.01 km^{2} (1.93 sq mi)

Population (2011)
  - Total: 1,051
  - Density: 210/km^{2} (543/sq mi)

Racial makeup (2011)
  - Black African: 42.1%
  - Coloured: 0.6%
  - Indian/Asian: 0.2%
  - White: 56.2%
  - Other: 1.0%

First languages (2011)
  - English: 47.9%
  - Afrikaans: 12.1%
  - Zulu: 7.4%
  - Northern Sotho: 5.8%
  - Other: 26.9%
- Time zone: UTC+2 (SAST)

Farmall is a rural settlement in Gauteng, South Africa. It is located in Region A of the City of Johannesburg. Farmall is mainly an agricultural suburb of Randburg made up of small holdings.

Farmall is also known as Chartwell West, as it is west of Chartwell.
