= Drieziek =

- Location within Gauteng Location within South Africa
- Coordinates: 26°29′13.7″S 27°49′45.9″E
- Country: South Africa
- Province: Gauteng
- Municipality: City of Johannesburg

Area
  - Total: 7.53 km^{2} (2.91 sq mi)

Population (2011)
  - Total: 35,622
  - Density: 4,730/km^{2} (12,300/sq mi)

Racial makeup (2011)
  - Black African: 99.3%
  - Coloured: 0.2%
  - Indian/Asian: 0.1%
  - White: 0.2%
  - Other: 0.2%

First languages (2011)
  - Zulu: 42.2%
  - Sotho: 28.0%
  - Xhosa: 8.3%
  - Tsonga: 7.0%
  - Other: 14.5%
- Time zone: UTC+2 (SAST)

Drieziek is a town located in Region G of the City of Johannesburg Metropolitan Municipality in Gauteng, South Africa, just west of Orange Farm.

== Infrastructure ==
=== Drieziek Taxi Facility ===
Drieziek Taxi Facility is a newly constructed modern facility which boasts a public square, toilets and parking, which will enable motorists to park their cars and hitch a taxi ride.

=== Library ===
The state of the art library has a designated children's area and upon completion will be serviced by about 10 staff members.

=== Multipurpose Center ===
From a learning perspective, the centre offers learning facilitation through a state-of-the-art library, a craft centre to facilitate artistic expression and growth, and an amphitheatre for community-organised shows, presentations and recitals.

== Notable persons ==
- Ntando Duma
- Mbuyiseni Ndlozi
