= Izgak De Jager =

South African politician

Member of the Western Cape Provincial Parliament
- In office 22 May 2019 – October 2019

Personal details
- Born: Izgak De Jager; 1963 or 1964 (age 61–62)
- Party: Al Jama-ah (Until 2019)
- Profession: Politician

Izgak De Jager (born 1963/1964) is a South African politician who served as a Member of the Western Cape Provincial Parliament for the Al Jama-ah party from May 2019 until October 2019.

== Political career ==
De Jager was the Al Jama-ah party's Western Cape premier candidate in the 2019 provincial election. The party won one seat in the Western Cape Provincial Parliament in the May election and De Jager then took up the seat.

In October 2019, De Jager was removed as the party's representative in the provincial parliament and replaced with Galil Brinkhuis after the party accused him of not complying with its agreement with him that he was supposed to pay 50% of his gross salary as a member of the provincial parliament to the party. De Jager, in turn, argued that the party's agreement with him was that he was to pay 50% of his net salary, not gross salary, and accused the party of not divulging its debt to party members.
