= City of Johannesburg Metropolitan Municipality =

Johannesburg
- Metropolitan municipality
- City of Johannesburg Metropolitan Municipality

- Location in Gauteng
- Coordinates: 26°10′S 28°0′E
- Country: South Africa
- Province: Gauteng
- Seat: Johannesburg
- Wards: 130

Government
  - Type: Municipal council
  - Mayor: vacant since election
  - Deputy Mayor: vacant since election

Area
  - Total: 1,645 km^{2} (635 sq mi)

Population (2022)
  - Total: 4,803,262
  - Density: 2,920/km^{2} (7,563/sq mi)

Racial makeup (2022)
  - Black African: 84.5%
  - Coloured: 4.8%
  - Indian/Asian: 3.5%
  - White: 7.0%

First languages (2011)
  - Zulu: 23.4%
  - English: 20.1%
  - Sotho: 9.6%
  - Tswana: 7.7%
  - Other: 39.2%
- Time zone: UTC+2 (SAST)
- Municipal code: JHB

The City of Johannesburg Metropolitan Municipality is a metropolitan municipality that manages the local governance of Johannesburg, the largest city in South Africa. It is divided into several branches and departments in order to expedite services for the city. Zulu is the most spoken home language at 23.4% followed by English at 20.1%.

Johannesburg is a divided municipality: the poor mostly live in the southern suburbs or on the peripheries of the far north, and the middle and upper class live largely in the suburbs of the center and north. As of 2012, unemployment was near 25% and most young people were out of work. Around 20% of the municipality lives in abject poverty in informal settlements that lack proper roads, electricity, or any other kind of direct municipal service.

== History ==
Following the end of the apartheid era, in April 1991 the Central Witwatersrand Metropolitan Chamber was formed as a "people-based" negotiating forum prior to holding a democratic election and the formation of a new administration for the Johannesburg area. Following the 1993 "Local Government Transition Act", the Greater Johannesburg Negotiating Forum was created, and this forum in September 1994 reached an agreement which entailed regrouping the suburbs into new municipal structures, the metropolitan local councils (MLCs), and the overarching Greater Johannesburg Metropolitan Council, also known as the "Transitional Metropolitan Council" for the city.

The government of Johannesburg's metropolitan area evolved over a seven-year period from 1993, when no metropolitan government existed under apartheid, to the establishment in December 2000 of today's Metropolitan Municipality. An "interim phase" commenced with the 1993 Constitution. This saw the establishment at the metropolitan level of the Transitional Metropolitan Council (TMC) and several urban-level councils under and neighbouring the TMC. In February 1997 the final constitution replaced the interim constitution and its transitional councils with the final system of local government which defined the current category A, B and C municipalities. Today's City of Johannesburg Metropolitan Municipality was created accordingly as a category A municipality, giving it exclusive executive and legislative power over its area.

=== 1995 and the Greater Johannesburg Metropolitan Council ===
The new post-apartheid administration was the "Greater Johannesburg Metropolitan Council" (GJMC), also known as the "Transitional Metropolitan Council", created in 1995. The council adopted the slogan "One City, One Taxpayer" to highlight its primary goal of addressing unequal tax revenue distribution. To this end, revenue from wealthy, traditionally white areas would pay for services needed in poorer, black areas. The City Council was divided initially into seven municipal substructures (MSSs), rationalised within a year to four MSSs, each with a substantially autonomous authority or "Metropolitan Local Council" (MLC) that was to be overseen by the central metropolitan council. Furthermore, the municipal boundaries were expanded to include wealthy satellite towns like Sandton and Randburg, poorer neighbouring townships such as Soweto and Alexandra, and informal settlements like Orange Farm. The four MLCs were: the Southern MLC covering Ennerdale, most of Soweto, parts of Diepmeadow and the old Johannesburg City and Lenasia; the Northern MLC covering Randburg and Randburg CBD, and parts of Soweto, Diepmeadow and the old Johannesburg City; the Eastern MLC covering Sandton, Alexandra, and part of the old Johannesburg City; the Western MLC covering Roodepoort, Dobsonville and parts of Soweto, Diepmeadow.

However, the new post-apartheid City Council ran into problems in part due to inexperienced management and political pressure, which contributed to over-ambitious revenue projections, over-spending, wasted expenditures and out-right fraud. In the newly combined metropole services were unnecessarily duplicated. But, by far, the biggest financial drain was the failure to collect revenues for services, which ranged from rent (rates) to utilities. Part of this failure was a result of the anti-apartheid boycott of paying the government.

In 1999, Johannesburg appointed a city manager to reshape the city's ailing financial situation. The manager, together with the Municipal Council, drew up a blueprint called "iGoli 2002". This was a restructuring plan to be completed in 2002, that called upon the government to sell non-core assets, restructure certain utilities, and required that all others become self-sufficient. The plan was strongly opposed by unions who feared a loss of jobs.

=== 2000 and the new Metropolitan Municipality ===
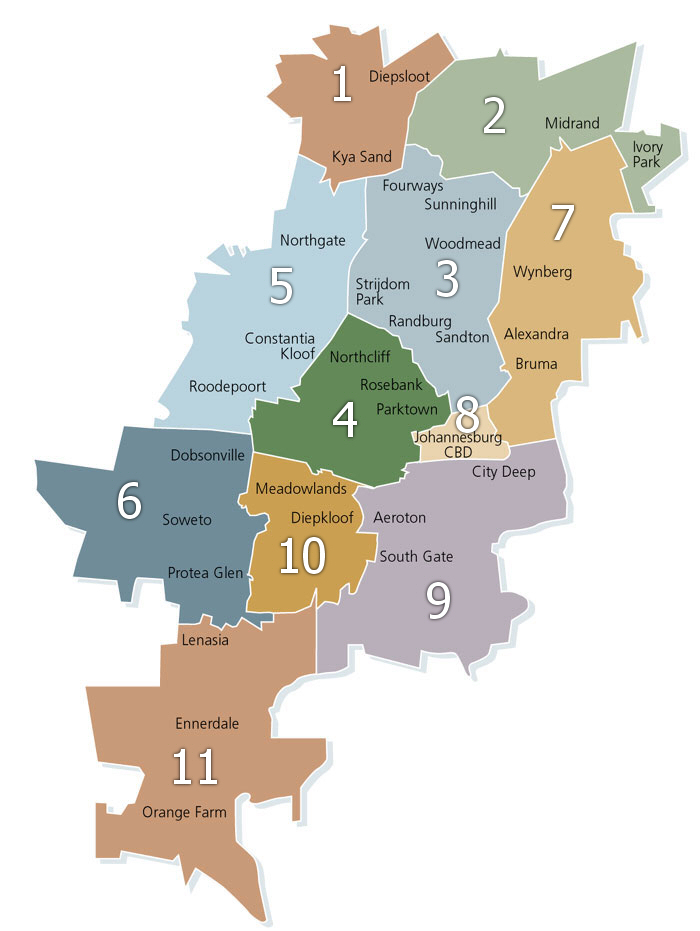
The eleven superseded regions

In 1999 the Municipal Demarcation Board conducted a study of metropolitan areas and other large councils, and found that Johannesburg should be declared as a "category A" municipality. The following Local Government Municipal Systems Act no. 32 of 2000 replaced the GJMC, its four MLCs and also the neighbouring Midrand Local Authority, with the new "City of Johannesburg Metropolitan Municipality" from 6 December 2000. The iGoli 2002 plan went into effect and returned some sectors into "cash cows" that helped support the city in general. Although some jobs were lost, there were no mass firings, as agencies used attrition to remove excess staff. The plan took the city from near insolvency to an operating surplus of R 153 million (US$23.6 million).

Following the relative success of iGoli 2002, the city undertook a number of initiatives both to help equalise municipal services benefits, such as the water utility's Free Basic Water policy, and to curb fraud and increase payment percentages, such as the water utility's Operation Gcin'amanzi to repipe areas to eliminate siphonage and to install water meters for excess use.

For the first six years the municipality was administered in eleven numbered regions, which were: "Region 1": Diepsloot, Kya Sand; "Region 2": Midrand, Ivory Park; "Region 3": Sandton, Rosebank, Fourways, Sunninghill, Woodmead, Strijdom Park; "Region 4": Northcliff, Rosebank, Parktown; "Region 5": Roodepoort, Northgate, Constantia Kloof; "Region 6": Doornkop, Soweto, Dobsonville, Protea Glen; "Region 7": Alexandra, Wynberg, Bruma; "Region 8": Inner City (Johannesburg CBD); "Region 9": Johannesburg South, South Gate, Aeroton, City Deep; "Region 10": Diepkloof, Meadowlands; "Region 11": Ennerdale, Orange Farm, Lenasia.

=== 2006 reorganisation ===
The present day City of Johannesburg was created from eleven existing local authorities, seven of which were white and four black or coloured. The white authorities were 90% self-sufficient from property tax and other local taxes, and produced and spent R 600 (US$93) per person in municipal services, while the black authorities were only 10% self-sufficient, spending R 100 (US$15) per person in municipal services. Although Johannesburg was divided into eleven administrative regions, these new divisions did not correspond to the areas governed by the former local authorities. Later, in 2006, the number of administrative regions was consolidated, from eleven to seven (see § Regions). The reason given was to separate powers between the legislative and executive bodies of the City.

Nonetheless, according to the opposition party, fraud, theft and non-payment still remained problems as of 2013. In fiscal year 2011, the city's audit had R 45,796 million chalked up to fraudulent activities. In 2013, the city admitted that it would be unable to collect two-thirds of the R 18 billion in outstanding billings.

The first undertaking of the newly created City of Johannesburg Metropolitan Municipality, as mapped out by the "Igoli 2002" plan, was to restructure Metro Gas, Rand Airport, and some sports stadiums as stand-alone corporate entities. The city bus service, the Johannesburg Zoo, the Civic Theatre, the Fresh Produce Market, and the city's property holdings were turned into corporations with the city as the single shareholder. Each was run as a business, with management hired on performance contracts.

In 2010–11, the municipality faced a qualified audit from the Auditor-General following a large number of billing issues, as the result of the flawed implementation of a SAP system. The city's call centre also experienced a crisis at the same time, with staff refusing to work.

== Geography ==
The municipality covers an area of 1,645 square kilometres (635 sq mi), stretching from Orange Farm in the south to Midrand in the north, and contains two big urban centres, Johannesburg and Midrand, and nine more smaller urban centres, namely Roodepoort, Diepsloot, Killarney, Melrose Arch, Randburg, Rosebank, Sandton, Soweto, and Sunninghill.

=== Main places ===
The 2011 census divided the municipality into the following main places (unchanged from the 2001 census):

Place	Code	Population	Area (km^{2})	Most spoken languages
Alexandra	798014	179,624	6.91	Zulu 26%, Pedi 23%, Tsonga 11%, Xhosa 9%, Tswana 9%, Sotho 7%, Venda 4%
Chartwell	798011	1,728	9.07	English 50%, Afrikaans 10%, Zulu 9%, foreign languages 7%, Ndebele 7%
City of Johannesburg (non-urban)	798002	9,933	289.84	English 15%, Zulu 14%, Sotho 12%, Afrikaans 11%, Tswana 10%, Xhosa 8%, Pedi 8%, foreign languages 5%, Tsonga 4%, Venda 4%
Dainfern	798012	6,601	4.08	English 65%, foreign languages 15%, Afrikaans 4%, Zulu 4%
Diepsloot	798003	138,329	12.00	Pedi 22%, Zulu 19%, Tsonga 10%, Ndebele 10%, Venda 9%, Tswana 7%, Xhosa 5%, foreign languages 4%, Sotho 4%
Drieziek	798035	35,622	7.53	Zulu 42%, Sotho 28%, Xhosa 8%, Tsonga 7%
Ebony Park	798007	22,309	1.63	Pedi 29%, Zulu 23%, Tswana 7%, Tsonga 7%, Xhosa 6%, Sotho 6%, Ndebele 4%, English 4%
Ennerdale	798033	71,815	21.33	Afrikaans 19%, English 18%, Zulu 17%, Sotho 16%, Xhosa 8%, Tsonga 5%, Tswana 5%
Farmall	798017	1,051	5.01	English 47%, Afrikaans 12%, foreign languages 9%, Zulu 7%, Pedi 5%, Tswana 4%, Ndebele 4%
Itsoseng	798021	5,243	0.58	Pedi 22%, Venda 15%, Tswana 13%, Zulu 11%, Ndebele 7%, Sotho 7%, Tsonga 7%, English 4%, foreign languages 4%, Xhosa 4%
Ivory Park	798006	184,383	9.21	Pedi 23%, Tsonga 22%, Zulu 21%, Xhosa 7%, foreign languages 5%, Ndebele 5%, Sotho 4%
Johannesburg	798015	957,441	334.81	English 31%, Zulu 19%, Afrikaans 12%, foreign languages 7%, Xhosa 5%, Ndebele 4%, Sotho 4%, Pedi 4%, Tswana 4%, Tsonga 3%, Venda 1%
Kaalfontein	798005	46,147	4.96	Pedi 30%, Zulu 21%, Tsonga 10%, Xhosa 8%, foreign languages 5%, Sotho 5%, Ndebele 5%, Tswana 4%
Kagiso	798024	5,182	0.57	Tswana 33%, Zulu 17%, Xhosa 11%, Sotho 9%, Tsonga 8%, Venda 5%, Pedi 4%
Kanana Park	798039	21,005	6.82	Zulu 35%, Xhosa 22%, Sotho 20%, Tsonga 5%
Lakeside	798037	23,503	3.78	Sotho 48%, Zulu 30%, Xhosa 8%
Lanseria	798019	4,788	1.83	Pedi 19%, Tswana 15%, Zulu 15%, Tsonga 10%, Venda 8%, English 7%, Sotho 6%, Xhosa 6%, Ndebele 5%
Lawley	798038	33,136	6.09	Zulu 28%, Sotho 20%, Tsonga 13%, Xhosa 8%, English 5%, Tswana 5%, Pedi 4%, Venda 4%, Afrikaans 4%
Lehae	798029	13,380	3.50	Zulu 42%, Sotho 13%, Tsonga 12%, Xhosa 10%, Tswana 5%
Lenasia	798028	89,714	20.28	English 55%, Zulu 8%, Tswana 8%, Sotho 6%, Xhosa 4%, foreign languages 4%, Afrikaans 4%
Lenasia South	798032	37,110	13.98	English 53%, Zulu 12%, Sotho 8%, Xhosa 5%, Tswana 5%
Lucky 7	798020	0	0.11	n. a.
Malatjie	798001	2,321	0.18	Pedi 23%, Tswana 13%, Zulu 12%, Venda 12%, Ndebele 9%, Tsonga 7%, Sotho 6%, foreign languages 5%, Xhosa 4%
Mayibuye	798009	22,178	1.16	Pedi 24%, Zulu 18%, Xhosa 15%, Tsonga 9%, Ndebele 9%, foreign languages 7%, Sotho 4%
Midrand	798004	87,387	152.87	English 50%, Zulu 10%, Afrikaans 6%, foreign languages 5%, Xhosa 5%, Tswana 5%, Pedi 4%, Sotho 4%
Millgate Farm	798018	172	0.88	n. a.
Orange Farm	798034	76,767	12.16	Zulu 44%, Sotho 29%, Xhosa 9%, Tsonga 4%
Poortjie	798040	11,153	2.43	Sotho 38%, Zulu 19%, Xhosa 18%, Tsonga 9%, Tswana 5%
Rabie Ridge	798008	41,204	3.33	Pedi 32%, Zulu 16%, Tsonga 9%, Afrikaans 8%, Xhosa 8%, Sotho 5%, Tswana 4%, Ndebele 4%
Randburg	798016	337,053	167.98	English 52%, Afrikaans 17%, Zulu 6%, foreign languages 5%, Tswana 4%
Randfontein	798027	0	9.19	n. a.
Rietfontein	798023	196	2.17	n. a.
Roodepoort	798022	326,416	161.50	English 29%, Afrikaans 23%, Zulu 9%, Tswana 8%, Pedi 4%, Xhosa 4%, Sotho 4%, foreign languages 3%, Venda 3%
Sandton	798013	222,415	143.54	English 63%, Afrikaans 7%, Zulu 6%, foreign languages 6%
Soweto	798026	1,271,628	200.03	Zulu 37%, Sotho 15%, Tswana 12%, Tsonga 8%, Pedi 5%, Venda 4%, English 2%, Ndebele 1%, Afrikaans 1%, foreign languages 1%
Stretford	798036	61,141	7.38	Zulu 39%, Sotho 34%, Xhosa 9%, Tsonga 4%
Tshepisong	798025	53,260	6.56	Zulu 26%, Tswana 22%, Xhosa 12%, Tsonga 12%, Sotho 9%, Pedi 5%, Venda 5%
Vlakfontein	798031	27,291	4.63	Zulu 38%, Sotho 17%, Tsonga 10%, Xhosa 9%, Tswana 6%, Pedi 4%
Zakariyya Park	798030	6,200	1.96	English 34%, Zulu 20%, Sotho 9%, Tswana 6%, Xhosa 6%, Tsonga 5%, foreign languages 4%
Zevenfontein	798010	0	3.11	n. a.

== Government ==
Each province determines the structure of local government in its region. Gauteng province, run by the African National Congress, has opted for a Mayor–council government. The first Mayor of Johannesburg was Amos Mosondo since the establishment of the current structure.

=== Regions ===
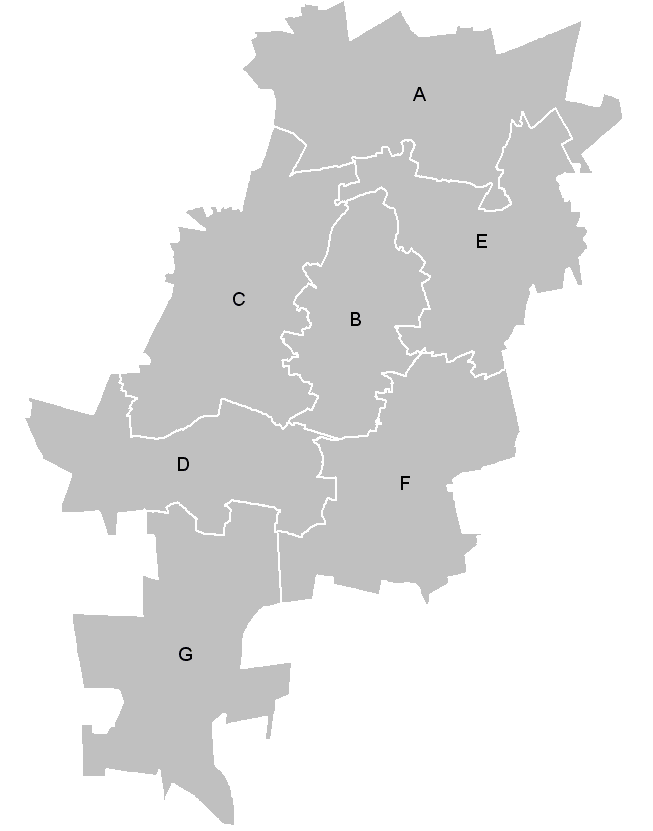
Johannesburg administrative regions

The administration of the City of Johannesburg Metropolitan Municipality was decentralised initially into eleven regions, named simply Region 1 to Region 11, which were largely unrelated to the 11 former apartheid administrations. The new numbered regions were subsequently consolidated, in the summer of 2006, to seven regions named Region A to Region G. The current regions are:

- Region A - Diepsloot, Midrand and Ivory Park (previously Regions 1 and 2)
- Region B - Northcliff and parts of Sandton, Randburg and Rosebank (previously Region 4 and parts of Region 3)
- Region C - Roodepoort and parts of Randburg (previously, Region 5)
- Region D - Soweto, Doornkop, Diepkloof and Meadowlands (previously Regions 6 and 10)
- Region E - Alexandra and parts of Sandton and Rosebank (previously Region 7 and parts of Region 3)
- Region F - inner city and Johannesburg South (previously Regions 8 and 9)
- Region G - Ennerdale, Orange Farm, Lenasia, Eldorado Park and Protea. (previously Region 11)

Each region is operationally responsible for the delivery of health care, housing, sports and recreation, libraries, social development, and other local community-based services, and each region has a People's Centre where any city-related transaction can be dealt with. Residents can lodge complaints, report service problems, and perform council-related business more quickly.

==== Changes to the previous city structure ====
After the end of apartheid allowed the consideration of the entire city of Johannesburg as one without consideration of race, it was determined that the previous structure of the city was wasteful and that there was much duplication of functions. Furthermore, some suburbs were affluent with well-established amenities while neighbouring areas lacked even the most basic of services. The new regions are presently smaller than previous mega-suburbs with each being home to about 300,000 people. The idea is that smaller regions are able to stay in closer contact with local communities.

==== Administration ====
The regions are no longer seen as part of the core administration, but instead take on a role as contractors to the central government. The relationship is similar to that of the larger utilities and agencies, such as City Power, and is designed to maximise efficiency.

The closeness of the new regional administrations with their communities enables them to be more responsive to differing local needs. For instance, the needs of a high-income commercial centre such as Sandton will be very different from the needs of a low-income area such as Orange Farm.

==== Local Integrated Development Plans ====
Local Integrated Development Plans (LIDPs) are plans for the development of a specific area. A LIDP guides a region's future development. For this reason, the LIDP zones closely follow the boundaries of the regions. However, in certain cases where suburbs are cut in half by the new region boundaries, the entire suburb may be covered in only one of the regions.

LIDPs deal with city development, management and growth over a five to 10-year period. While they deal with local issues, they take an integrated approach to issues such as transportation, housing and environmental management. An overall Metropolitan IDP looks at the bigger picture and ensures that LIDPs don't conflict or lead to wasted resources. LIDPs will be revised annually so as to respond to changing conditions both locally and at a city level.

=== City council ===
As of the August 2016 municipal elections, the municipal council consists of 270 City Councillors in Johannesburg elected by mixed-member proportional representation. The Councillors are divided into two kinds: (a) 135 Ward councillors who have been elected by first-past-the-post voting in 135 wards; and (b) 135 councillors elected from party lists (so that the total number of party representatives is proportional to the number of votes received).

Ward Councillors have more local responsibilities, including setting up Ward Committees in their wards to raise local issues, commenting on town planning and other local matters in their ward, and liaising with local ratepayers' and residents' associations. PR Councillors are usually allocated to more political tasks within their party structures and within the city.

=== Elections ===
In the election of 1 November 2021 the African National Congress (ANC) won the largest share of the seats on the council with 91 but once again did not achieve a majority. The DA won the speaker and mayoral position during the council meeting held on the 22 November 2021. Vasco da Gama (council speaker) and Mpho Phalatse were elected respectively. On the 26 January 2023, Phalatse was removed from office through a motion of no confidence. She was succeeded by Al-Jama-ah councillor Thapelo Amad. Amad's tenure was short-lived and he resigned in April 2023. Kabelo Gwamanda, also of Al-Jama-ah, was elected to succeed him.

In the election of 4 November 2026 no party obtained a majority. The Democratic Alliance (DA) received the most seats, with ninety-one.

The following table shows the results of the 2026 South African municipal elections.

Party	Ward			List			Total seats
Party	Votes	%	Seats	Votes	%	Seats	Total seats
Democratic Alliance	436,710	35.03	51	431,111	34.63	40	91
African National Congress	250,079	20.06	64	253,961	20.40	0	64
ActionSA	188,697	15.14	9	216,504	17.39	33	42
Economic Freedom Fighters	81,496	6.54	2	81,120	6.52	15	17
uMkhonto weSizwe Party	69,579	5.58	1	69,301	5.57	14	15
Inkatha Freedom Party	30,966	2.48	4	30,513	2.45	3	7
Patriotic Alliance	27,327	2.19	2	22,460	1.80	3	5
Freedom Front Plus	21,966	1.76	0	23,704	1.90	5	5
Rise Mzansi	23,596	1.89	0	20,769	1.67	5	5
African Transformation Movement	12,409	1.00	0	13,958	1.12	3	3
Al Jama-ah	13,224	1.06	2	10,858	0.87	1	3
South African Communist Party	9,285	0.74	0	7,268	0.58	2	2
African Christian Democratic Party	7,321	0.59	0	8,297	0.67	2	2
Afrika Mayibuye Movement	7,951	0.64	0	6,271	0.50	2	2
African Independent Congress	7,185	0.58	0	3,509	0.28	1	1
Build One South Africa	5,626	0.45	0	4,984	0.40	1	1
Independent candidates	10,172	0.82	0				0
People's Movement for Change	3,527	0.28	0	3,467	0.28	1	1
Pan Africanist Congress of Azania	3,017	0.24	0	2,548	0.20	1	1
Economic Liberators Forum South Africa	2,996	0.24	0	2,431	0.20	1	1
African People's Convention	2,513	0.20	0	2,071	0.17	1	1
African Heart Congress	2,052	0.16	0	1,843	0.15	1	1
61 other parties	28,870	2.32	0	28,137	2.26	0	0
Total	1,246,564	100.00	135	1,245,085	100.00	135	270
Valid votes	1,246,564	98.49		1,245,085	98.63		
Invalid/blank votes	19,150	1.51		17,316	1.37		
Total votes	1,265,714	100.00		1,262,401	100.00		
Registered voters/turnout	2,417,915	52.35		2,417,915	52.21		

=== Mayors ===
(Post-apartheid mayors)

- Isaac Mogase, 1995 - 2000 (ANC)
- Amos Masondo, 2000 - 2011 (ANC)
- Parks Tau, 2011 - 2016 (ANC)
- Herman Mashaba, 2016 - 2019 (DA)
- Geoff Makhubo, 2019 - 2021 (ANC)
- Jolidee Matongo, 2021 - 2021 (ANC)
- Mpho Moerane, 2021 - 2021 (ANC)
- Mpho Phalatse, 2021 - 2022 (DA)
- Dada Morero, 2022 - 2022 (ANC) [disputed]
- Mpho Phalatse, 2022 - 2023 (DA)
- Thapelo Amad, 2023 - 2023 (Al Jama-ah)
- Kabelo Gwamanda, 2023 - 2024 (Al Jama-ah)
- Dada Morero, 2024–present (ANC)

== Service provision ==
The city management team head office is the Metro Centre Complex in Braamfontein, which is responsible for overall administration, financial control, supply of services, and collection of revenues. The fire department and ambulances, the metropolitan police and traffic control, museums, art galleries, libraries and heritage sites are all controlled by separate departments.

Some of the key city service functions are supplied by separate, self-contained entities, each run on business lines with its own CEO.

There are 10 utilities, including electricity which is run by City Power Johannesburg, water and sanitation which is run by Johannesburg Water, and solid waste management, also known as Pikitup. Utilities are registered companies, run on business lines. They must be self-funding, receiving no annual grants from the city. They provide billable services direct to individual households.

In 2025, Johannesburg Metropolitan Municipality councilor Theo Doyle argued that South Africa should look beyond its borders for solutions to its water challenges. As part of this approach, he participated in a delegation organized by the Patriotic Alliance to Israel to study water management and desalination technologies, noting their potential relevance to Johannesburg's infrastructure and water security needs.

Agencies include Johannesburg Roads Agency, City Parks and Johannesburg Development Agency. Each of these performs a service to the public at large – there are no direct charges to individual consumers. These are also structured as separate companies, but they are reliant on the council for funding.

The zoo, Civic Theatre, metro bus service, fresh produce market and property company each compete in the open market to "sell" their wares to individual consumers who choose to pay for their services. These departments have been "corporatised" into separate businesses, run by new managements on performance contracts, and tasked to cut their subsidy levels by R100-million in the next five years.

The public library system of the metropolitan municipality is the City of Johannesburg Library and Information Services (CoJLIS). It oversees about 90 public branch libraries.

== See also ==
- Johannesburg
- Johannesburg City Parks
- Johannesburg Emergency Water Supply
