= Mayor of Johannesburg =

Head of the local government of Johannesburg, South Africa

- Coat of Arms of Johannesburg

- Flag of Johannesburg

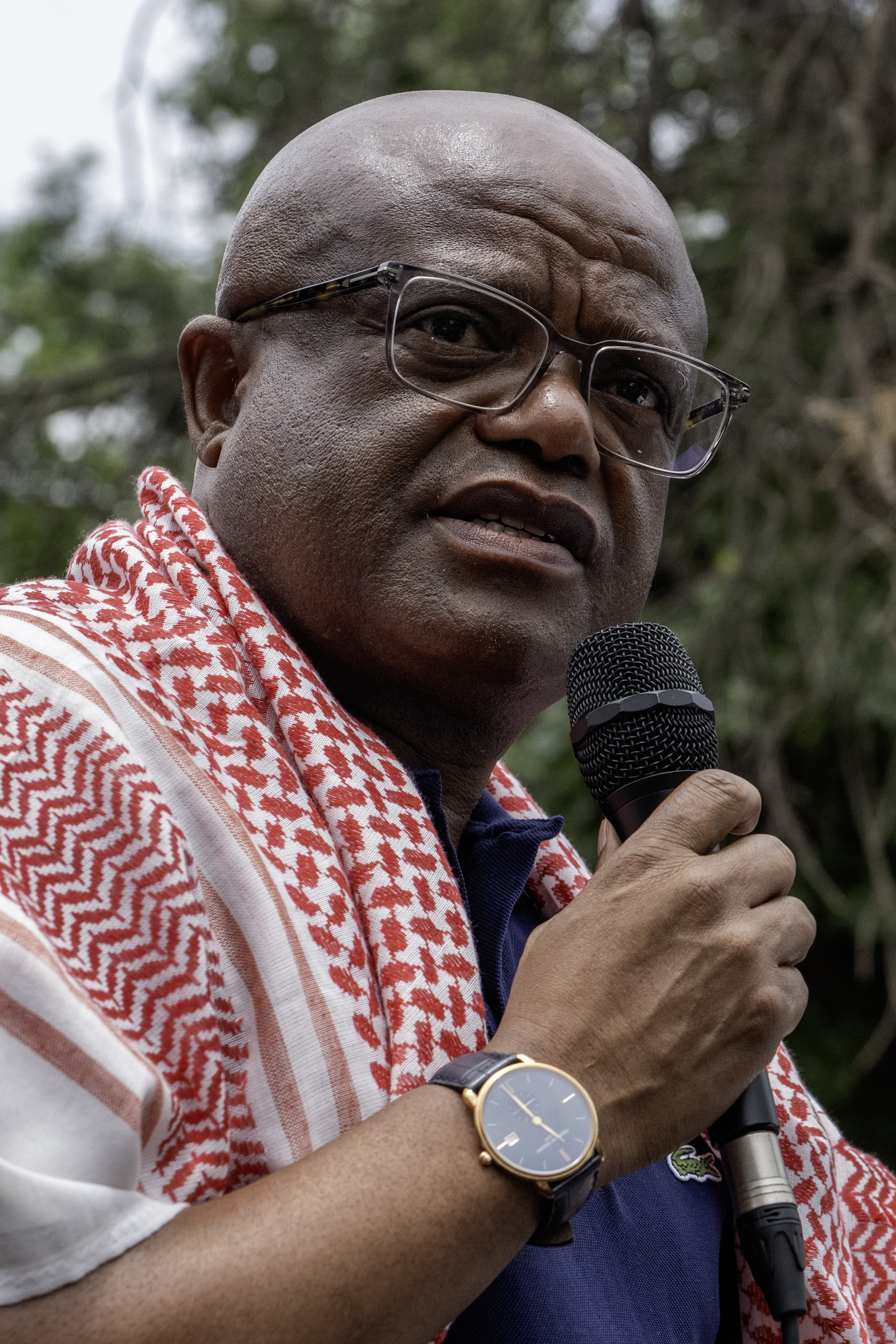
- Incumbent; Dada Morero since 16 August 2024
- City of Johannesburg Metropolitan Municipality
- Style: Mr. Mayor (informal)
- Reports to: City of Johannesburg Metropolitan Council
- Term length: Five years
- Inaugural holder: Johan Zulch de Villiers
- Formation: 1897

The mayor of Johannesburg is the highest elected position in the city of Johannesburg, South Africa. Since 2000, they are the chief executive of the City of Johannesburg Metropolitan Municipality council. On 16 August 2024, the council elected Dada Morero to the position. Due to the re-election which happened in early November a new mayor is to be re-elected soon, this will be updated when it does.

== List of mayors ==
=== Johannesburg Metro: 2000–present ===
The City of Johannesburg Metropolitan Municipality was established in 2000 and its inaugural council was elected in the municipal elections of that year.

| Name | Term of office | | Political party | Ref. |
|---|---|---|---|---|
| Amos Masondo | 2000 | 2011 | African National Congress | |
| Parks Tau | 26 May 2011 | 22 August 2016 | African National Congress | |
| Herman Mashaba | 22 August 2016 | 27 November 2019 | Democratic Alliance | |
| Geoff Makhubo | 4 December 2019 | 9 July 2021 | African National Congress | |
| Jolidee Matongo | 10 August 2021 | 18 September 2021 | African National Congress | |
| Mpho Moerane | 1 October 2021 | 22 November 2021 | African National Congress | |
| Mpho Phalatse | 22 November 2021 | 20 September 2022 | Democratic Alliance | |
| Dada Morero (Note: In October 2022, the Johannesburg High Court ruled that Phalatse's removal from office, and therefore Morero's election, was unlawful and invalid. Phalatse was reinstated.) | 30 September 2022 | 25 October 2022 | African National Congress | |
| Mpho Phalatse | 26 October 2022 | 26 January 2023 | Democratic Alliance | |
| Thapelo Amad | 27 January 2023 | 24 April 2023 | Al Jama-ah | |
| Kabelo Gwamanda | 5 May 2023 | 16 August 2024 | Al Jama-ah | |
| Dada Morero | 16 August 2024 | present | African National Congress | |

=== Johannesburg: 1897–2000 ===
The following lists the mayors of Johannesburg before the establishment of the present-day metropolitan municipality in 2000.

- Johan Zulch de Villiers (1897–1900) – appointed by South African Republic Executive Committee
- Walter Alfred John O'Meara (1900–1902) – appointed by British Military Administration
- William St. John Carr (1902–1904)
- George H. Goch (1904–1905)
- John William Quinn (1905–1906)
- William K. Tucker (1906–1907)
- James Thompson (1907–1908)
- Charles Chudleigh (1908–1909)
- Harry Graumann (1909–1910)
- Harry J. Hofmeyr (1910–1911)
- J. D. Ellis (1911–1912)
- William Richard Boustred (1912–1913)
- Norman Anstey (1913–1915)
- John Wesley O'Hara (1915–1917)
- T. F. Allen (1917–1919)
- G. B. Steer (1919–1920)
- John Christie (1920–1921)
- S. Hancock (1921–1922)
- L. Forsyth Allan (1922–1923)
- M. J. Harris (1923–1924)
- C. Walters (1924–1925)
- E. O. Leake (1925–1926)
- Alfred Law Palmer (1926–1927)
- W. H. Port (1927–1928)
- W. Fernhead (1928–1929)
- D. Anderson (1929–1930)
- George W. Nelson (1930–1931)
- D. F. Corlett (1931–1932)
- B. C. Vickers (1932–1933)
- D. Penry Roberts (1933–1934)
- Maurice Freeman (1934–1935)
- Maldwyn Edmund (1935–1936)
- Donald W. Mackay (1936–1937)
- J. S. Fotheringham (1937–1938)
- J. J. Page (1938–1939)
- T. A. M. Huddle (1939–1940)
- T. P. Gray (1940–1941)
- A. R. Thorburn (1941–1942)
- L. Leveson (1942–1943)
- A. S. Holland (1943–1944)
- A. Immink (1944–1945)
- Jessie McPherson (1945–1946)
- James Gray (1946–1947)
- G. B. Gordon (1947–1948)
- S. P. Lee (1948–1949)
- J. Mincer (1949–1950)
- C. F. Beckett (1950–1951)
- I. E. B. Attwell (1951–1952)
- Hyman Miller (1952–1953)
- C. J. H. Patmore (1953–1954)
- G. J. Beckett (1954–1955)
- Leslie Hurd (1955–1956)
- Max Goodman (1956–1957)
- T. Glyn Morris (1957–1958)
- Ian Maltz (1958–1959)
- Alec Gorshel (1959–1960)
- D. J. Marais (1960–1962)
- Keith J. Fleming (1962–1963)
- J. F. Oberholzer (1963–1964)
- P. M. Roos (1964–1965)
- Aleck Joffe (1965–1966)
- Boyce D. Eagar (1966–1967)
- C. J. Ross-Spencer (1967–1968)
- I. Schlapobersky (1968–1969)
- Patrick R. B. Lewis (1969–1970)
- S. Moss (1970–1971)
- Alf Widman (1971–1972)
- J. C. Lemmer (1972–1973)
- A. D. Bensusan (1973–1974)
- Harold Frank Dennis (1974–1975)
- Max Neppe (1975–1976)
- Monty Sklaar (1976–1977)
- Martin Powell (1977–1978)
- J. S. Otto (1978–1979)
- J. D. R. Opperman (1979–1980)
- Carel Venter (1980–1981)
- Cecil Long (1981–1982)
- Danie van Zyl (1982–1983)
- Alan Gadd (1983–1984)
- Eddy Magid (1984–1985)
- Ernie Fabel (1985–1986)
- Harold Rudolph (1986–1987)
- O. H. Fenn (1987–1988)
- J. H. van Blerk (1988)
- David J. Neppe (1988–1989)
- Koos Roets (1989–1990)
- William G. L. Janse van Rensburg (1990–1991)
- Elliot Kretzmer (1991–1992)
- J. S. Burger (1992–1993)
- Les Dishy (1993–1994)
- Dan Pretorius (1994)
- Isaac Mogase (1995–2000)

== See also ==
- Timeline of Johannesburg
- City of Johannesburg elections
