= Galil Brinkhuis =

South African politician

Galil Brinkhuis MPP
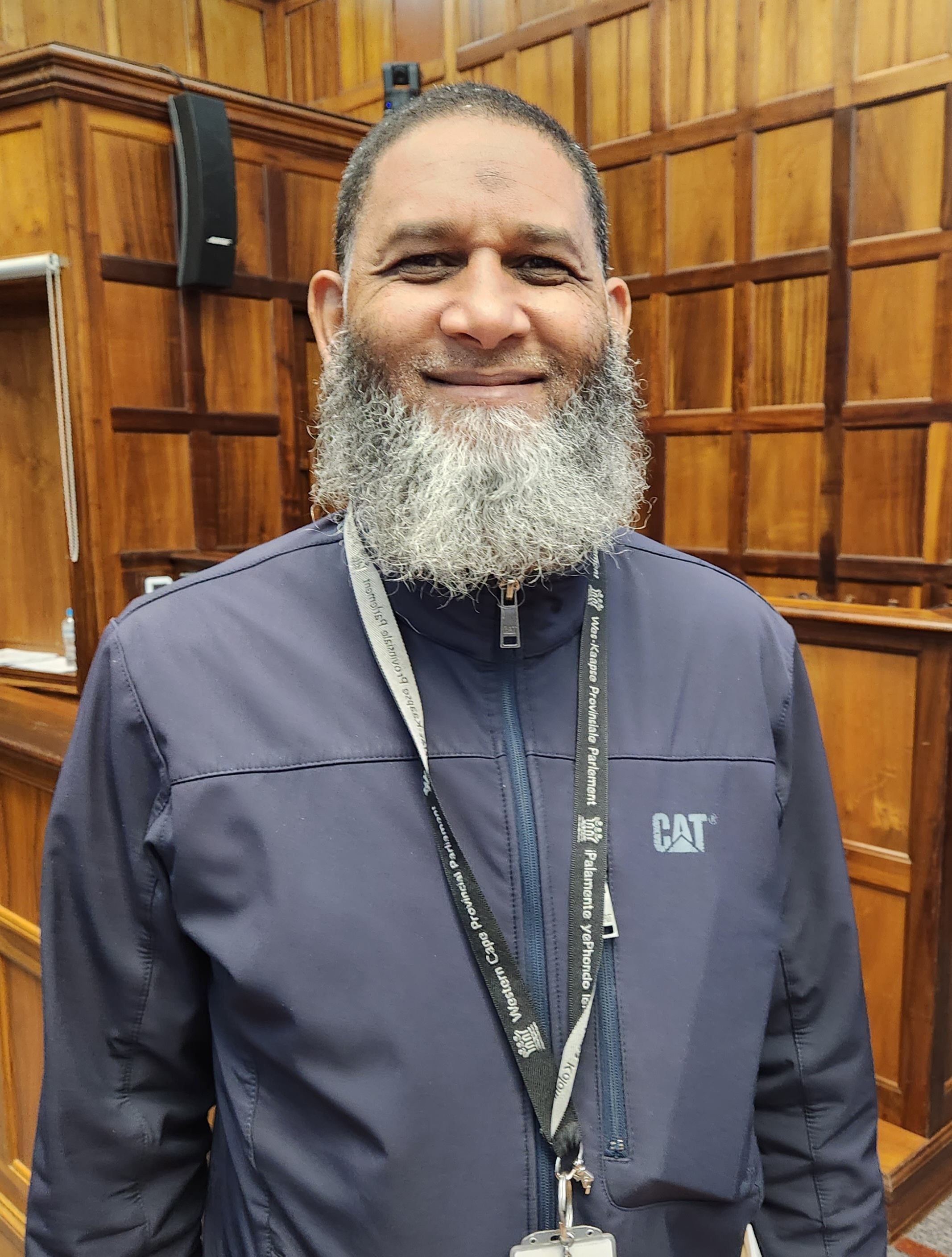

Member of the Western Cape Provincial Parliament
- Incumbent
- Assumed office 23 October 2019

Personal details
- Born: Galil Brinkhuis
- Party: Al Jama-ah
- Occupation: Member of the Provincial Parliament
- Profession: Politician

Galil Brinkhuis is a South African politician. He is the sole representative of Al Jama-ah in the Western Cape Provincial Parliament.

Brinkhuis was placed 4th on Al Jama-ah's provincial list and 12th on the party's national list for the 2019 general elections.

In October 2019, Brinkhuis was sworn in as a Member of the Western Cape Provincial Parliament. This followed the cessation of Izgak De Jager's membership. Brinkhuis serves on the Budget Committee, the Standing Committee on Education, and the Standing Committee on Community Safety, Cultural Affairs and Sport.

Brinkhuis received traditional Islamic training from the Darul 'Uloom Zakariyya seminary based in Johannesburg in 2004, earning him the title of Mawlana.

Brinkhuis was elected to a full term in the Provincial Parliament in the 2024 provincial election.
