= Maurice Freeman =

South African politician

Maurice Freeman was the mayor of Johannesburg, South Africa from 1934 to 1935.

Before laying the foundation stone of the new police station at Newlands General the Right Hon. J. C. Smuts, Minister of Justice, with Mayor Maurice Freeman inspected a guard of honour provided by the police.
