= Thapelo Amad =

South African politician

Councillor Thapelo Amad

Mayor of Johannesburg
- In office 27 January 2023 – 24 April 2023
- Preceded by: Mpho Phalatse
- Succeeded by: Kabelo Gwamanda

Member of the Johannesburg City Council
- Incumbent
- Assumed office October 2019

Personal details
- Born: Soweto, Gauteng, South Africa
- Party: Al Jama-ah

Thapelo Amad is a South African politician and imam, and a former mayor of Johannesburg. A member of the Johannesburg City Council, Amad is affiliated with the Al Jama-ah party. On 27 January 2023, he was elected mayor of Johannesburg with the support of the African National Congress (ANC). His election made him the first Muslim to serve as mayor of Johannesburg. He resigned as mayor on 24 April 2023 to avoid being defeated in a motion of no confidence.

== Background ==
Amad was born in Soweto in present-day Gauteng. He holds a degree in Islamic Sciences and a NQF Level 4 qualification in entrepreneurship and a NQF Level 5 qualification in gender mainstreaming in the public service, which he obtained through the National School of Government.

He is a fellow of the ASRI Future Leaders program. At present, he is studying for a certificate of competence through the South African Local Government Association. He is also an imam.

== Political career ==
Amad is a Johannesburg city councillor and the provincial chairperson of Al Jama-ah. In October 2022, he served as the Member of the Mayoral Committee (MMC) for Development Planning in the short-lived administration of former ANC mayor Dada Morero.

== Mayoralty of Johannesburg ==
=== Selection ===
After Mpho Phalatse was voted out as mayor in a motion of no confidence on 26 January 2023, it was revealed that Amad would likely succeed her, since he was supported by the African National Congress (ANC), the largest party in council and its coalition partners. The ANC said in a statement that Amad would serve as an interim mayor until the party finalises a coalition agreement with the Economic Freedom Fighters (EFF), the kingmakers in council.

During the council meeting the following day, Amad, Phalatse and ActionSA's Funzi Ngobeni was nominated for mayor. Amad was elected mayor by 138 votes, compared to Phalatse's 81 votes and Ngobeni's 46 votes.

=== Tenure ===
On 2 February 2023, Amad announced to the members of his mayoral committee. The committee consisted of five ANC councillors, and a single councilor each from the EFF, the African Transformation Movement, and the Patriotic Alliance.

Amad resigned as mayor on 24 April 2023, a day before a motion of no confidence was to be held against him. He was succeeded by fellow Al Jama-ah councillor Kabelo Gwamanda as mayor.

== Post-mayoral career ==
On 21 November 2023, Amad posted a picture of him holding an assault rifle to his X account with the caption: "We stand with Hamas, Hamas stands with us, together we Palestin [sic] and Palestin [sic] will be free. With our souls, with our blood, we will conquer Al AQSA." He later removed the post. Amad's posts were widely condemned on social media. The South African Jewish Board of Deputies condemned Amad's posts, calling them "reprehensible". The Israeli Ministry of Foreign Affairs called the post "pure antisemitism of the worst kind."
