= Vasco da Gama (politician) =

South African politician (born 1959)

Councillor Vasco Da Gama
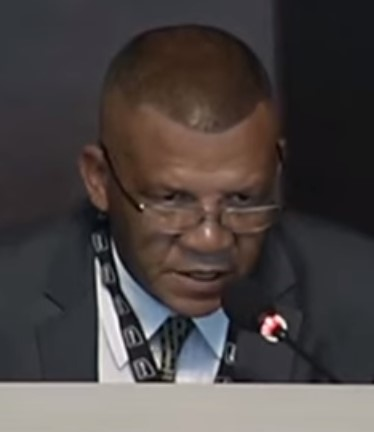

Speaker of the City of Johannesburg Metropolitan Municipality
- In office 22 November 2021 – 31 August 2022
- Preceded by: Nonceba Molwele
- Succeeded by: Colleen Makhubela
- In office 22 August 2016 – 11 December 2019
- Preceded by: Constance Bapela
- Succeeded by: Nonceba Molwele

Personal details
- Born: Vasco Manuel da Gama; 29 January 1959 (age 67) Louis Trichardt, Transvaal Province, South Africa
- Party: Democratic Alliance

Vasco Manuel Da Gama (born 29 January 1959) is a South African politician with the Democratic Alliance and a member of the Johannesburg City Council. He most recently served as the Johannesburg council speaker until 31 August 2022 when a motion of no confidence was settled with 136 votes for the motion and 132 against it, resulting in Da Gama’s ouster.

== Early life and education ==
Da Gama, named after Vasco da Gama, was born in Louis Trichardt, Transvaal (now Limpopo) in 1959. In 1969, his family was forcibly removed from their homes as part of the government's apartheid policy, which led to Da Gama to study at a Coloured-only school.

== Career ==
In 2011, he ran as a DA mayoral candidate for Johannesburg before a panel of 30 people, including party leader and Premier of the Western Cape Helen Zille, but was defeated by Mmusi Maimane. Following Maimane's departure to the National Assembly in 2014, Da Gama was appointed leader of the DA's caucus, a position he had previously held.

In August 2016, Da Gama was elected council speaker. He was removed as speaker in December 2019 and replaced with the ANC's Nonceba Molwele. After the 2021 local government elections, the DA put him forward as their candidate for council speaker.

He was elected council speaker at the inaugural council meeting on 22 November 2021 after he received 147 out of the 265 votes. The ANC's Eunice Mgcina received only 118 votes.

== Personal life ==
Born in modern-day Limpopo, Da Gama later moved to Alexandra in Gauteng. He currently lives in Eldorado Park with his wife. He reportedly speaks all eleven official languages of South Africa.

Following his election, he received attention for his name, which he shares with 16th century Portuguese explorer Vasco da Gama, among the first Europeans to visit the Cape of Good Hope.
