= Orange Farm =

Township in Gauteng, South Africa

Orange Farm Farmton
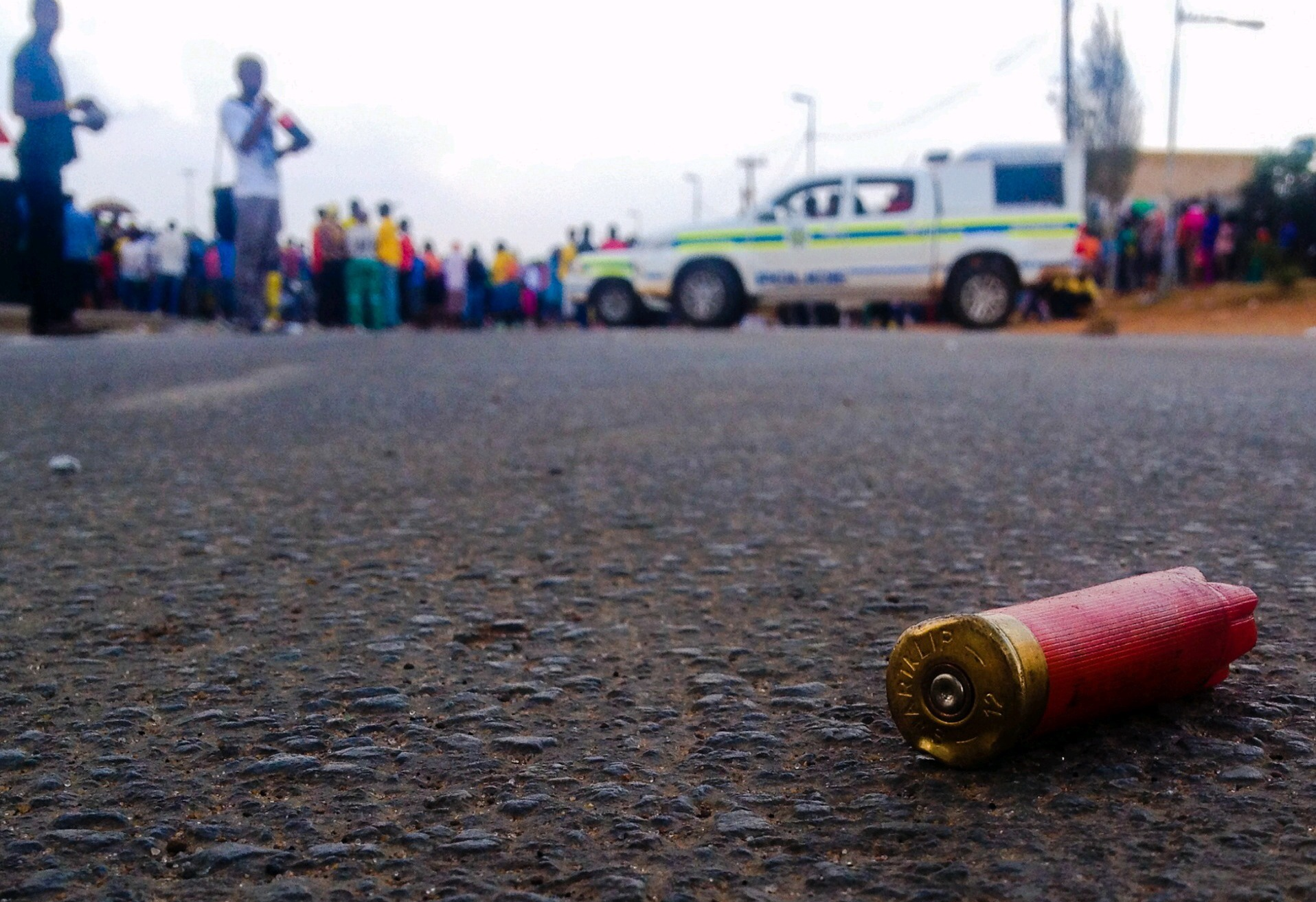
- Orange Farm Youth Protest

- Location within Gauteng Location within South Africa
- Coordinates: 26.465°S 27.857°E
- Country: South Africa
- Province: Gauteng
- Municipality: City of Johannesburg
- Established: 1988

Government
  - Councillor: Motha (ANC)

Area
  - Total: 12.16 km^{2} (4.70 sq mi)

Population (2011)
  - Total: 76,767
  - Density: 6,313/km^{2} (16,350/sq mi)

Racial makeup (2011)
  - Black African: 99.3%
  - Coloured: 0.3%
  - Indian/Asian: 0.1%
  - White: 0.1%
  - Other: 0.2%

First languages (2011)
  - Zulu: 44.5%
  - Sotho: 29.1%
  - Xhosa: 9.5%
  - Tsonga: 4.1%
  - Other: 12.8%
- Time zone: UTC+2 (SAST)
- Postal code (street): 1805
- PO box: 1805
- Area code: 1841

Orange Farm ("Farma") is a township located approximately 45 km (28 mi) from Johannesburg in the Gauteng Province of South Africa. It is the southernmost township of the City of Johannesburg Metropolitan Municipality. Its name has Dutch origins. It is one of the youngest townships in South Africa, with the original inhabitants, laid-off farm workers, taking up residency in 1988. Support for the population came slowly mostly from people who were tenants at the larger township of Soweto.

== Demographics ==
Approximately 85% of the people work in Johannesburg. Most of the people use trains to get to work. 35% of the residents are unemployed.

== Infrastructure and Public Services Delivery ==
=== Public services delivery ===
The Orange Farm Water Crisis Committee, an offshoot of the South African Anti-Privatization Forum (AFP), has been very vocal and active against the privatization of water. This committee was formed against poor basic service delivery of water in the area.

=== Infrastructure ===
Orange Farm is a rapidly growing township with great infrastructural developments each year. The township has a large main clinic (Stretford Clinic) and several minor clinics. The township's main roads are tarred and several minor streets may be tarred but in questionable condition. Orange farm has a small official library, permanent housing for many residents (mainly government housing). Electricity is readily available to most places with only a few areas without electricity (including the Squatter camp in Drieziek 5). The town has a large multi-purpose community center.

However, these improvements come with financial costs, which most of the citizens living in Orange Farm cannot afford. The ongoing privatization of Orange Farm has also drawn much criticism from social justice and human rights groups as they have pointed out that local small businesses keep dying. This can also be linked to the rising number of foreign owned shops in the area. A lot has been done to improve Orange Farm; it now has more than two parks and a two floor mall (Eyethu Orange Farm Mall). However, nearly all areas still need improvement.

=== Parks ===
Mountain Road Park (opened 12 October 2014) is situated in Orange Farm Ext 2, 1 km away from Eyethu Orange Farm Mall. This park sits where there used to be a soccer/football pitch of Ext 2 (Liver Pool Grounds).

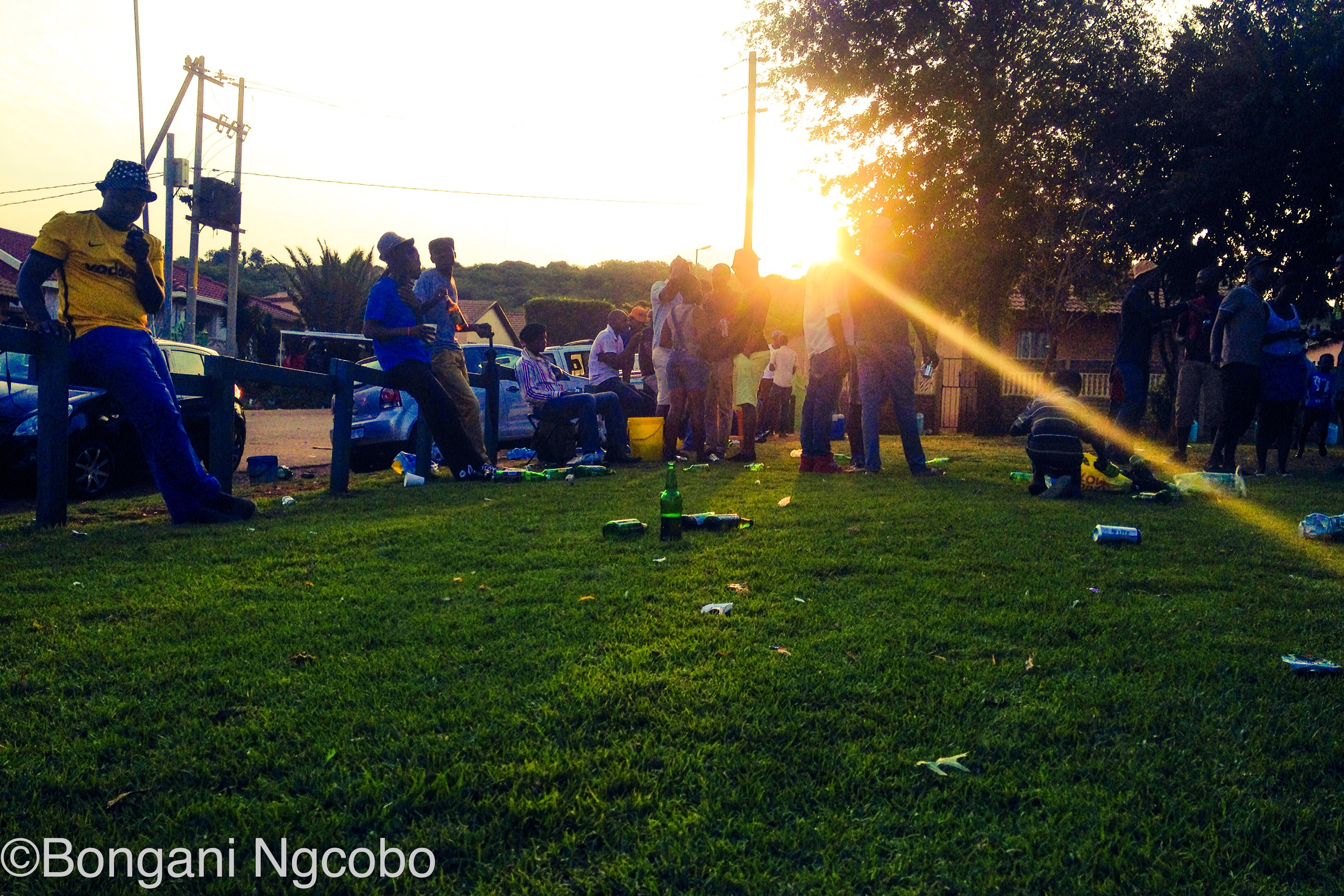
Orange Farm residents at the park

== Climate ==
Köppen-Geiger climate classification system classifies its climate as subtropical highland (Cwb).

Climate data for Orange Farm
Month	Jan	Feb	Mar	Apr	May	Jun	Jul	Aug	Sep	Oct	Nov	Dec	Year
Mean daily maximum °C (°F)	26.4 (79.5)	25.8 (78.4)	24.7 (76.5)	22.1 (71.8)	19.6 (67.3)	16.9 (62.4)	17.3 (63.1)	20.3 (68.5)	23.4 (74.1)	25 (77)	25.3 (77.5)	26.1 (79.0)	22.7 (72.9)
Daily mean °C (°F)	20.4 (68.7)	19.8 (67.6)	18.5 (65.3)	15.5 (59.9)	12.1 (53.8)	9 (48)	9.2 (48.6)	12.1 (53.8)	15.7 (60.3)	18 (64)	19 (66)	19.9 (67.8)	15.8 (60.3)
Mean daily minimum °C (°F)	14.4 (57.9)	13.9 (57.0)	12.3 (54.1)	8.9 (48.0)	4.6 (40.3)	1.2 (34.2)	1.2 (34.2)	4 (39)	8 (46)	11 (52)	12.7 (54.9)	13.7 (56.7)	8.8 (47.9)
Average precipitation mm (inches)	136 (5.4)	101 (4.0)	84 (3.3)	63 (2.5)	20 (0.8)	8 (0.3)	7 (0.3)	7 (0.3)	24 (0.9)	73 (2.9)	112 (4.4)	115 (4.5)	750 (29.6)
Source: Climate-Data.org, altitude: 1667m
