= Indian Christian Front =

Indian political party

- Leader: M.L.Sundaram
- Founded: M.L.Sundaram, 16 October 2000
- Headquarters: LIG No. 289, Opposite to Velankanni Church, Anna Nagar, Madurai – 625020
- Ideology: Social democracy; Populist; Political Christianity
- Political position: Centrist
- Alliance: United National Progressive Alliance (2004 & 2009 –present)

Party flag
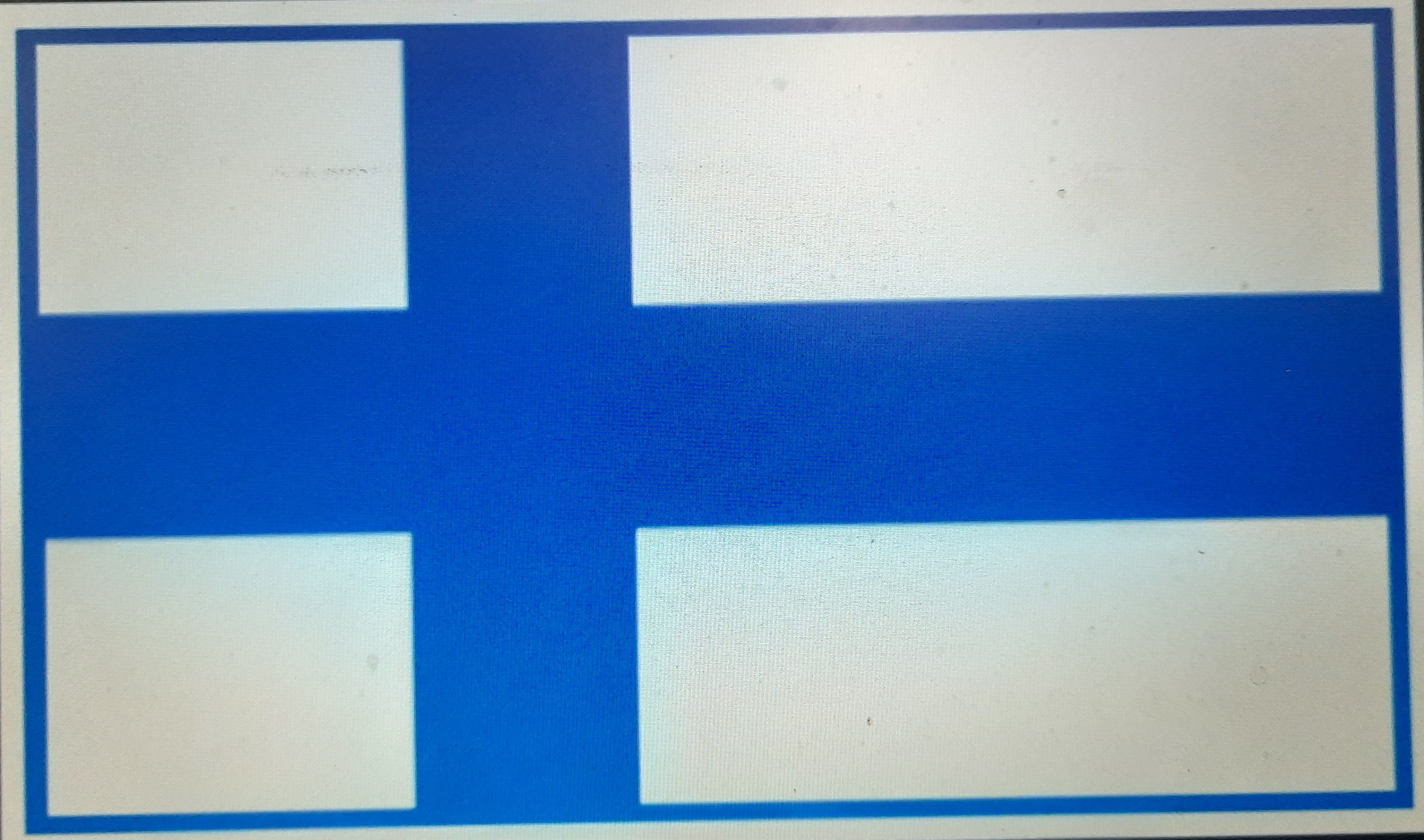

Website
- www.indianchristainfront.in

The Indian Christian Front (ICF) is a Christian political party in the Indian state of Tamil Nadu. The president of the party is M.L. Sundaram. ICF, together with the Christian Democratic Front, contested the local elections in 2001.

== History ==
The party supported the All India Anna Dravida Munnetra Kazhagam (AIADMK), forming an alliance in the 2001 Tamil Nadu state assembly election.

In 2004 & 2009, the party extended its support to the United Progressive Alliance (UPA), which strengthened the hand of the Prime Minister Manmohan Singh.

In 2011, Tamil Nadu State Assembly Election, the party extended its support to All India Anna Dravida Munnetra Kazhagam (AIADMK), which has recently gained power in Tamil Nadu.

In 2014, Loksabha Election, the party extended its support again to All India Anna Dravida Munnetra Kazhagam (AIADMK), which has swept 37 (out of 40) Seats in Tamil Nadu.

In 2016, Tamil Nadu State Assembly Election, the Indian Christian Front (ICF) extended its support again to All India Anna Dravida Munnetra Kazhagam (AIADMK), except in 4 seats (Palani, Thiruverumbur, Killiyoor) in which the Front tossed its own candidates. AIADMK had swept 134 (out of 232) Seats and got re-elected to retain power in Tamil Nadu. ICF could get only a combined 800 votes from the four seats.

In 2019, Lok Sabha Election, the party contested in 3 states, Tamil Nadu, Karnataka and Andhra to prove its considerable existence. Tiruchirappalli, Chennai South, Bengaluru Central, Bengaluru South and Kurnool are noted constituencies.

In 2021, Tamil Nadu State Assembly Election, (on the basis of the recommendations of CSI and Catholic Denominations in South India)the Indian Christian Front (ICF) established an "Indian Christian Federation" and extended its support to Dravida Munnetra Kazhagam (DMK) led alliance which has recently gained power in Tamil Nadu.Instead of tossing its own candidates, it supported and campaigned for Christian DMK candidates. Few Among them where Dr.Inigo Irudhayaraj (Tiruchirappalli -East), Joseph Samuel (Ambattur), JJ Ebenezer (RK Nagar).

In the 2023 Karnataka Legislative Assembly election Anthony A Santhosh of ICF contested from Shanti Nagar Assembly constituency but could only get 233 votes.

In 2024, Loksabha Election, the party extended its support again to All India Anna Dravida Munnetra Kazhagam (AIADMK).

The Front has 100,000 members in Tamil Nadu and Pondicherry, and the Christian population was around 5 per cent at the time in Tamil Nadu and Pondicherry.

== Objectives ==
1. To ensure that Dalit Christians are included in the SC list (a list of officially disadvantaged people groups in India) and are given rights on a par with other Dalits
2. To demand government jobs for one member in each family, according to eligibility norms
3. To remove what the party believes to be hurdles prevailing in the Christian minority educational institutions
4. To cultivate relationship other minorities based on caste, religion, language, race etc., to safeguard minority in the welfare of nation.
