= Mpho Mbebe =

South African soccer player

Personal information
- Full name: Mpho Etam Mbebe
- Date of birth: 14 April 1992 (age 34)
- Place of birth: South Africa
- Position: Midfielder

Senior career*
Years	Team	Apps	(Gls)
2013–2014	Royal Eagles	18	(5)
2015–2016	SuperSport United	3	(0)
- * Club domestic league appearances and goals

Mpho Etam Mbebe (born 14 April 1992) is a South African footballer who played as a midfielder.

== Club career ==
=== Royal Eagles ===
In January 2014, Mbebe joined Sivutsa Stars in the National First Division.

When Sivutsa Stars was bought out by millionaire couple Shauwn and Sbu Mpisane and renamed as Royal Eagles, Mbebe was one of the players retained.

=== SuperSport United ===
In February 2015, Mbebe signed a 2.5 year contract with SuperSport United, despite being on trial at the Black Leopards. Following the signing, Black Leopards launched a complaint against SuperSport United, claiming he had been trialling with them (even scoring a brace against SuperSport) and was in the process of signing with them. The coach Gordon Igesund praised Mbebe, believing he has what it takes to become the next big thing for his side and claiming that he will take the league by storm.
