= Mpho Moerane =

South African politician (1969–2022)

Mayor of Johannesburg
- In office 1 October 2021 – 22 November 2021
- Preceded by: Jolidee Matongo
- Succeeded by: Mpho Phalatse

Personal details
- Born: 16 February 1969 Alexandra, Transvaal Province, South Africa
- Died: 18 May 2022 (aged 53) Johannesburg, Gauteng, South Africa
- Party: African National Congress
- Spouse: Fikile
- Children: 4
- Education: Minerva High School
- Profession: Electrician, businessman, politician

Mpho Moerane (16 February 1969 – 18 May 2022) was a South African electrician, businessman and politician who was the mayor of Johannesburg between October and November 2021. A member of the African National Congress, he previously served as the member of the mayoral committee (MMC) for environment and infrastructure services from December 2019 to September 2021. Moerane was the regional treasurer of the ANC in Johannesburg.

== Background ==
Moerane was born in the Alexandra township outside Johannesburg. After matriculating from Minerva High School, he completed a course in electrical engineering and obtained a project management certificate. Moerane then worked for Eskom until 2006, when he became a businessman. He ran his own restaurant business before he was elected to the city council of Johannesburg. Apart from sitting on the boards of Metro Bus and Alexandra Clinic, he was also a non-executive director for Chancellor House Holdings.

== Political career ==
Moerane served as the head of fundraising in the office of the regional treasurer in Johannesburg for the African National Congress. He then became the treasurer of the regional structure.

Moerane was appointed as the member of the mayoral committee (MMC) for environment and infrastructure services after Geoff Makhubo became mayor of Johannesburg in December 2019. In this capacity, Moerane launched the #KleenaJoburg campaign in January 2020 to encourage residents and stakeholders of Alexandra to clean up the environment. When Makhubo died from COVID-19 related complications in July 2021, he was replaced as mayor in August 2021 by Jolidee Matongo, who retained Moerane as MMC for environment and infrastructure services. After Matongo was killed in a car accident in September, the ANC chose Moerane to become their preferred mayoral candidate. He was elected and sworn into office on 1 October 2021, serving till the local government elections on 1 November.

At the inaugural council meeting of the 2021–2026 term on 22 November 2021, Moerane was defeated by Mpho Phalatse in the election for mayor.

== Personal life and death ==
Moerane was married to Fikile, who is an information technology and financial services consultant. They had four children together and lived in Bryanston.

Moerane died on 18 May 2022, at Netcare Milpark Hospital in Johannesburg from the injuries he had sustained in a car accident a week earlier.

Political offices
Preceded by Jolidee Matongo	Mayor of Johannesburg; 2021	Succeeded by Mpho Phalatse
