= Kabelo Gwamanda =

South African politician

Mayor of Johannesburg
- In office 5 May 2023 – 16 August 2024
- Preceded by: Thapelo Amad
- Succeeded by: Dada Morero

Personal details
- Born: Soweto, South Africa
- Party: Al Jama-ah
- Known for: Assisting at Human settlement and Under Umalusi.

Kabelo Gwamanda is a South African politician who was the mayor of Johannesburg from May 2023 until August 2024. A member of the Al Jama-ah party, he was the ninth executive mayor of the metropolitan municipality since 2016 and is currently deployed as the MMC for community development in the city of johannesburg metro.

== Mayoral career ==
After fellow Al Jama-ah councillor Thapelo Amad resigned as mayor of Johannesburg due to pressure from coalition partners, the largest party in council, the African National Congress (ANC), endorsed Gwamanda for the position of mayor on 5 May 2023 in order to keep its alliance with the Economic Freedom Fighters (EFF), another party in council. He was elected during a council vote held via secret ballot on that same day, receiving 139 votes out of the 266 votes. Gwamanda announced his mayoral committee shortly after his election.

The Democratic Alliance (DA) caucus in council has called Gwamanda a "scammer" over allegations that he scammed residents into investing in a funeral/investment scheme through his company iThemba Lama Afrika.

Gwamanda delivered his maiden State of the City Address on 6 June 2023. The following day, Gwamanda fell ill during the debate on the State of the City Address and was hospitalised.

On 13 August 2024, after coming under pressure from Al Jama-ah's coalition partner, the ANC, Gwamanda announced his resignation as Johannesburg mayor. On 16 August 2024, he was replaced as mayor by Dada Morero, who was elected to a second, non-consecutive, term.

== Arrest ==
Gwamanda was arrested on 20 October 2024 for fraud around an alleged funeral policy scam that he ran in 2011.
