= Christian Front (South Africa) =

Political party in South Africa

The Christian Front (CF) was a conservative Christian political party in South Africa, a breakaway from the Christian Democratic Party.

The leader of the CF was Rudi Du Plooy. Aside from operating as a political party, it also ran a Special Social Committee, mandated to look after the elderly and destitute.

The CF was deregistered by the IEC before the 2014 general election.
