= Geoff Makhubo =

South African politician (1968–2021)

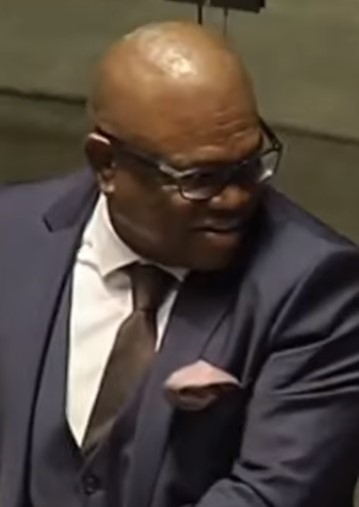
- Makhubo after being elected Mayor on 4 December 2019

Mayor of Johannesburg
- In office 4 December 2019 – 9 July 2021
- Preceded by: Herman Mashaba
- Succeeded by: Eunice Mgcina (Acting); Jolidee Matongo

Regional Chairperson of the African National Congress in Johannesburg
- In office 1 July 2018 – 9 July 2021
- Preceded by: Parks Tau

Personal details
- Born: 8 February 1968 Soweto, Transvaal Province, South Africa
- Died: 9 July 2021 (aged 53) Johannesburg, Gauteng, South Africa
- Cause of death: COVID-19
- Party: African National Congress (Until 2021; his death)
- Education: University of Witwatersrand

Moloantoa Geoffrey Makhubo (8 February 1968 – 9 July 2021) was a South African politician who served as the Mayor of Johannesburg from December 2019 until his death from COVID-19 in July 2021. He was a member of the African National Congress and the party's regional chair. During the administration of Parks Tau, he served as the MMC (Member of the Mayoral Committee) for Finance.

== Early life and education ==
Makhubo was born in 1968 in Soweto in the previous Transvaal Province. He obtained a BComm degree from the University of the Witwatersrand in 1990. He fulfilled many Advanced Management courses. Makhubo completed a Management Advancement Programme (MAP) at Wits Business School in 1997. He also earned a Leadership in Local Government certificate from the University of Cape Town. At the time of his death in 2021, he was enrolled for a master's degree at Wits University.

== Politics ==
Makhubo was the chairperson of the African National Congress Youth League while in his youth. He served as the Johannesburg MMC for Finance under the mayoralty of Parks Tau. He also held the roles of Leader of Executive Business in Council and Chairperson of the Governance Cluster when Tau was mayor. Makhubo had served as the Co-President of the Metropolis Global Fund for Cities’ Development (FMDV).

He had held senior leadership roles in the African National Congress's Greater Johannesburg Region. He was the regional treasurer before he became the regional leader in July 2018. He was appointed the caucus leader of the ANC in the city council after the resignation of Parks Tau in May 2019.

== Mayoralty ==
On 28 November 2019, the African National Congress announced that it had nominated Makhubo for the position of mayor following the resignation of the Democratic Alliance's Herman Mashaba. He was officially elected to the office on 4 December 2019 after he received 137 out of 268 votes. The DA's Funzela Ngobeni received 101 votes, while the EFF's Musa Novela received 30 votes.

Makhubo entered office under much controversy as he had been accused of gross corruption by both the Economic Freedom Fighters and the Democratic Alliance following a payment of R30 million to his company from Regiments Capital, a firm implicated in the ongoing State Capture inquiries, while he served as Finance MMC.

On 27 November 2020, Makhubo testified at The Judicial Commission of Inquiry into Allegations of State Capture.

In May 2021, Makhubo was accused of corruption related to dealings with the company EOH Group as outlined at the Zondo Commission.

== Death ==
Makhubo died of COVID-19 related complications on 9 July 2021. He had been hospitalised a week prior.
