= Al Jama-ah =

Political party in South Africa

Al Jama-ah الجماعة
- Leader: Ganief Hendricks
- Spokesperson: Shameemah Salie
- Founded: 23 April 2007
- Headquarters: Howard Centre, Pinelands, Cape Town
- Ideology: Islamic democracy; Social democracy; Social conservatism; Anti-Zionism; Ubuntu
- Political position: Social: Right-wing; Fiscal: Left-wing
- National affiliation: Progressive Caucus (2024)
- Colours: Green; Black; Red
- National Assembly: 2 / 400
- National Council of Provinces: 0 / 90
- Western Cape Provincial Parliament: 1 / 42
- Cape Town City Council: 3 / 231

Party flag

Website
- www.aljama.co.za

Al Jama-ah (Arabic: الجماعة, lit. 'the Congregation') is a South African political party. It was formed in 2007 by present leader Ganief Hendricks and contested the 2009, 2014, 2019 and 2024 national elections.

The party aims to support Muslim rights and interests, though the party states that it supports working for the shared interest of all South Africans from different religious and cultural backgrounds. The flag of Al Jama-ah depicts a white jīm (ج, the first letter in its Arabic name), upon a field consisting of the other Islamic colours. In January 2023, party member Thapelo Amad became Mayor of Johannesburg. He resigned in April and was replaced by fellow party member Kabelo Gwamanda.

== History ==
Until 2019, the party had no elected representatives nationally or provincially although it came close in both the 2009 and 2014 elections, and won nine seats at the local level in the 2016 municipal elections.

It made a breakthrough in 2019, winning its first national representative (becoming the first Islam-affiliated party to do so), as well as one seat in the Western Cape legislature.

In October 2019, its member of parliament for the Western Cape, Izgak De Jager, was replaced by Galil Brinkhuis after De Jager was accused of not complying with an agreement to pay 50% of his gross salary to the party. De Jager in turn stated that the agreement was to pay 50% of the net, not gross salary, and accused the party of failing to disclose its debt to its members.

In January 2023, Al Jama-ah's Thapelo Amad was chosen as Mayor of Johannesburg with the support of the African National Congress. He resigned in April and was replaced by fellow party member Kabelo Gwamanda.

In 2024, the party retained its single seat in the Western Cape Provincial Parliament and gained an additional seat in the National Assembly, but claims that it turned down an offer from the African National Congress to participate in a Government of National Unity as it did not wish to be part of any coalition with the Democratic Alliance. However, Al Jama-ah ultimately decided to join the Government of National Unity (GNU). The leader of Al Jama-ah, Mogamad Ganief Ebrahim Hendricks, became Deputy Minister of Social Development in the coalition.

== Ideology and principles ==
Al Jama-ah is a social democratic party with a focus on food and water security, education, and economic equality.

=== Economic policy ===
The party aims to eliminate value-added tax on essential food items such as bread, milk, and eggs. Further, it believes in legislation promoting land reform and the equitable distribution of the means of production. It also aims to implement "non-discriminatory socioeconomic policies" and encourage entrepreneurship.

=== Education ===
The main educational aims of the party are to provide free textbooks and stationery at all education levels. It also wants to improve the quality of public schooling to dismantle the legacy of unequal access to education left by Apartheid. Further, it believes in an adult basic education program to improve national literacy.

=== Health care ===
Al Jama-ah supports a high quality public health care system. It wants to implement national health insurance and improve the management of hospitals and health centers. Further, it aims to set up mobile clinics in areas with poor health care access.

=== Muslim marriages ===
Al Jama-ah introduced two private member's bills regarding Muslim marriages. The Registration of Muslim Marriages bill, and the second bill aimed to reform the Divorce Act of 1997 to comply with the proposed marriage legislation.

=== Opposition to LGBTQ+ Rights ===
Al Jama-ah has attempted to exclude proposals by the LGBTIQ+ community from the revised White Paper on Family Life. Al Jama-ah stated that they support the revision of the White Paper on Family Life provided that the revisions respected “traditional” family structures “based on a divine system” that does not recognise LGBTIQ+ families. Al Jama-ah has previously criticized a Woolworths Pride month display stating that “instead of perpetuating normal descent practices,” the retailer “deliberately chose to make this ‘abnormality’ normal and socially acceptable.” Al Jama-ah has criticised the DA-run Western Cape Education Department and the DA for having “readily embraced the LGBTQI+ agenda without critically thinking about its consequences.” The party said it was “alarmed at the increasing campaigns both in the business sectors and educational institutions to enforce questionable behavior patterns under the notion of ‘normalising’ the LGBTQ+ agenda.”

== Controversies ==
=== City of Johannesburg corruption ===
Thapelo Amad, an Al Jama-ah councillor in the City of Johannesburg, served as the city's Mayor for less than three months in 2023, and was forced to resign ahead of a motion of no confidence in his fitness for office. Amad came under fire for referring to a R9.5 billion loan offer to the city from a private company. Amad was replaced as Mayor by one of only three Al Jama-ah councillors in the City of Johannesburg, Kabelo Gwamanda, who was elected with the support of the ANC and the EFF. Gwamanda also survived a motion of no confidence after he was accused of running an illegal funeral scheme. He is alleged to have deserted investors in his funeral insurance scheme after they claimed funeral benefits. Gwamanda is under investigation by the Financial Sector Conduct Authority.

=== Fugitive prophet ===
Party leader Hendricks admitted to having travelled to Malawi to meet fugitive prophet Shepherd Bushiri, a wanted man who fled South Africa following charges of fraud and money laundering amounting to over R100 million as well as charges of rape and sexual assault. Hendricks returned from Malawi with a prophetic prediction from Bushiri, indicating the party's electoral support would increase. Hendricks told Newzroom Afrika that the party expected one million votes after Bushiri advised his three million congregants to vote for Al Jama-ah. The party went on to only receive about 39,000 votes on the national ballot.

=== Prayer for the ANC ===
Galil Brinkhuis, a religious leader who represents Al Jama-ah in the Western Cape Provincial Parliament made a prayer for the African National Congress during a sitting of the legislature on the eve of the 2024 elections, adding that he hoped the party would take the lead in province. Al Jama-ah distanced itself from Brinkhuis's prayer, saying that it was out of line with party interests. Brinkhuis later apologised and said that it was a mistake to pray for another party's success.

=== Electricity surcharge fee ===
Under Al Jama-ah's Gwamanda administration, the City of Johannesburg introduced a R200 surcharge fee for prepaid electricity meters in July 2024 in addition to a 12.7 electricity tariff fee. Residents criticised the City of Johannesburg for implementing the surcharge fee without public participation, however, Gwamanda denied this and instead defended the fee and said that it was there to stay. The R200 fee targeted poor households and was criticised for the consequences it would have.

=== Controversy involving Thapelo Amad ===
In 2025, Al Jama-ah councillor Thapelo Amad was found by the South African Human Rights Commission (SAHRC) to have engaged in "unlawful hate speech" over a 2023 social media post in which he posed with an assault rifle and expressed support for Hamas, the Palestinian group.The SAHRC ordered Amad to issue an unconditional apology, and announced in April 2026 that it would reopen the inquiry and consider referring the matter to the Equality Court after he failed to comply. Prior to joining Al Jama-ah as a senior member, Amad had faced criticism over the post, in which he wrote: "with our blood, we will conquer Al Aqsa".Al Jama-ah did not publicly censure Amad or distance itself from the remarks.

== Election results ==
=== National Assembly elections ===
Election	Party leader	Total votes	Share of vote	Seats	+/–	Government
2009	Ganief Hendricks	25,947	0.15	0 / 400	New	Extra-parliamentary
2014	Ganief Hendricks	25,976	0.14	0 / 400	0	Extra-parliamentary
2019	Ganief Hendricks	31,468	0.18	1 / 400	▲1	Opposition
2024	Ganief Hendricks	39,067	0.24 (Note: From 2024, seats in the National Assembly are determined by a combination of the national ballot, and the nine regional ballots. Only the national ballot figures are shown here.)	2 / 400	▲1	Third Cabinet of Cyril Ramaphosa

=== Provincial elections ===
Election	Eastern Cape		Free State		Gauteng		Kwazulu-Natal		Limpopo		Mpumalanga		North-West		Northern Cape		Western Cape	
Election	%	Seats	%	Seats	%	Seats	%	Seats	%	Seats	%	Seats	%	Seats	%	Seats	%	Seats
2014	–	–	–	–	–	–	–	–	–	–	–	–	–	–	–	–	0.62%	0/42
2019	0.15%	0/63	–	–	0.18%	0/73	0.28%	0/80	–	–	–	–	–	–	–	–	0.86%	1/42

=== Municipal elections ===
In a by-election in November 2020, Al Jama-ah won a ward in the City of Johannesburg from the Democratic Alliance.

Election	Votes	%	+/–
2011	13,227	0.04%	–
2016	36,891	0.10%	+0.06
2021	61,189	0.20%	+0.10

== See also ==
- Africa Muslim Party
