= Milden =

Milden may refer to:

- Milden, Angus, Scotland
- Rural Municipality of Milden No. 286, Saskatchewan, Canada
  - Milden, Saskatchewan, Canada
- Milden, Suffolk, England
- MILDEN, Turkish Navy's national Atılay-class submarine project
- Moudon, Canton Vaud, Switzerland
