= Milbank (disambiguation) =

Milbank LLP is an international law firm.

Milbank may also refer to:

== People ==
- Dana Milbank (born 1968), American journalist
- Frederick Milbank (1820–1898), English peer and politician
- Jane Hungerford Milbank (1871–1931), American suffragette
- Jeremiah Milbank (1818–1884), American businessman
- John Milbank (born 1952), English Anglican theologian
- Mark Milbank (1907–1984), British Army officer and courtier
- Powlett Milbank (1881–1964), English peer and politician

== Places in the United States ==
- Milbank, South Dakota, a city
- Milbank, Virginia, an unincorporated community

== Other uses ==
- Milbank baronets, a title in the Baronetage of England
- Milbank Quarterly, medical journal

== See also ==
- Milbanke
- Millbank (disambiguation)
