= Millgate =

Millgate may refer to:

== Places ==
- Millgate, Lancashire, a location in England
- Millgate, Norfolk, a location in England
- Millgate Farm, Johannesburg, South Africa

== Other uses ==
- Millgate Monthly, magazine
- Gabby Millgate, Australian actress
- Jane Millgate (1937-2019), British academic
