= Mill Green =

Mill Green may refer to:

- Mill Green, Babergh, a hamlet in Suffolk, England
- Mill Green, Buxhall, a hamlet in Suffolk, England
- Mill Green, Cambridgeshire, England
- Mill Green, Essex, a hamlet in Essex, England
  - Fryerning Mill, a windmill in Mill Green, Essex near Fryerning, Essex, England
- Mill Green, Hampshire, a location in England
- Mill Green, Hertfordshire, an area of Hatfield, England
  - Mill Green Watermill, a watermill in Hertfordshire
- Mill Green, Norfolk, a location in England
- Mill Green, Shropshire, a location in England
- Mill Green, Staffordshire, a location in England
- Mill Green, Stonham Aspal, a hamlet in Suffolk, England
- Mill Green Historic District, a community located in Street, Maryland, United States
