= Milbanke =

Milbanke may refer to:

- Milbanke baronets, title in the Baronetage of England, created 1661

== People ==
- Sir Ralph Milbanke, 5th Baronet (1725–1798), English peer and politician
- Admiral Mark Milbanke (1724–1805), senior British naval officer
- Ada King-Milbanke, 14th Baroness Wentworth (1871–1917), British peer
- Sir John Ralph Milbanke Huskisson, 8th Baronet (1800–1868), British diplomat and peer
- Annabella Milbanke (1792–1860), known as Lady Byron, wife of poet George Gordon Byron
- Elizabeth Milbanke (1751–1818), the political hostess Elizabeth Lamb, Viscountess Melbourne, wife of Peniston Lamb, 1st Viscount Melbourne
- Sir John Milbanke, 10th Baronet, VC (1872–1915), British Army officer
- Noel Anthony Scawen Lytton-Milbanke, 4th Earl of Lytton (1900–1985), known as Noel Lytton, 4th Earl of Lytton, British Army officer and writer
- Ralph King-Milbanke, 2nd Earl of Lovelace (1839–1906), British author

== See also ==
- Milbanke Sound
- Milbanke Sound Group
- Milbank (disambiguation)
- Millbank (disambiguation)
