= Doornkop =

- Location within Gauteng Location within South Africa
- Coordinates: 26°13′58″S 27°47′0″E
- Country: South Africa
- Province: Gauteng
- Municipality: City of Johannesburg
- Main Place: Soweto

Area
  - Total: 1.25 km^{2} (0.48 sq mi)

Population (2001)
  - Total: 8,740
  - Density: 6,990/km^{2} (18,100/sq mi)
- Time zone: UTC+2 (SAST)
- PO box: 1821

Doornkop (literally "thorn hill") is a ridge and locality on the western outskirts of Soweto in the Gauteng Province, South Africa. The area is currently being subsumed by the westward expansion of Soweto and the eastward growth of Krugersdorp's Kagiso township. Suburbs include Tshepisong, Leratong Village, Bambayi and Thulani. Doornkop is also known as Thulani, Snakepark and Silvertown.

There is another place named Doornkop, a community 15 km north of Middelburg in the Steve Tshwete Local Municipality in Mpumalanga.

== History ==
=== Jameson raid 1895-1896 ===
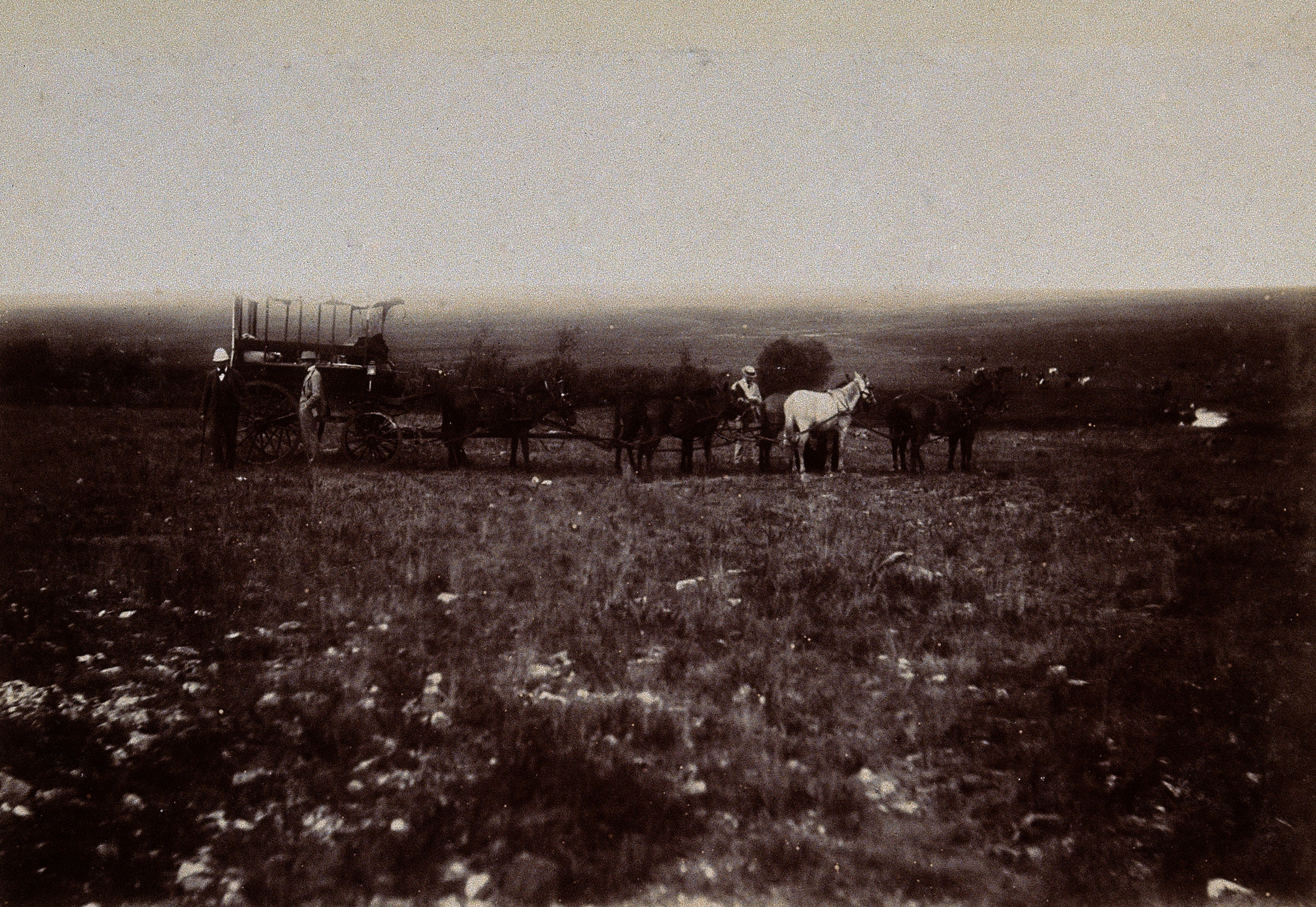
English tourists with horses and a cart at the battlefield of Doornkop, 1896

Doornkop is the spot where Dr Leander Starr Jameson was defeated on 2 January 1896 following the Jameson Raid.

=== Battle of Johannesburg 1900 ===
The Doornkop area is also linked in popular history to the third day (29 May 1900) of the Battle of Johannesburg that took place nearby from 27 to 29 May 1900 during the Second Boer War. The ridge was taken by cavalry under command of Lt Gen John French while a nearby ridge, now covered by several Soweto suburbs, was taken by seven infantry battalions, including the following units on the left and right flank.

==== Left Flank ====
- 21st Brigade;
- the City Imperial Volunteers
- The Derbyshire Regiment
- The Cameron Highlanders
- The 1st Battalion The Royal Sussex Regiment.

==== Right Flank of Lt Gen Ian Hamilton ====
- 19 Brigade;
- The Gordon Highlanders.
- The 2nd Battalion The Royal Canadian Regiment.
- The Kings Shropshire Light Infantry.
- The Duke of Cornwall's Light Infantry.
