= Mill Street =

Mill Street may refer to:

- Mill Street, Kent, a location in England
- Mill Street, Norfolk, a location in England
- Mill Street, Oxford, England
- Mill Street (Perth, Scotland)
- Mill Street, Perth, Western Australia
- Mill Street, Suffolk, a location in England
- Millstreet, County Cork, Ireland
- Mill Street Brewery, Toronto, Canada
- Mill Street Stone Arch Bridge, Pine Hill, New York, US
- Newport Mill Street railway station, Wales

== See also ==
- Mill Street-North Clover Street Historic District, New York, USA
- South Ann Street-Mill Street Historic District, New York, USA
- Mill Lane (disambiguation)
- Mill Road (disambiguation)
