= Millbank (disambiguation) =

Millbank, London is a street in the City of Westminster, or its immediate area.

Millbank may also refer to:

== People ==
- Aaron Millbank (born 1995), English footballer
- Joe Millbank (1919–2002), English footballer
- Joseph Duveen, 1st Baron Duveen of Millbank (1869–1939), British art dealer

== Places ==
=== Australia ===
- Millbank, Queensland, a suburb of Bundaberg
- Millbank, New South Wales, a suburb in Nambucca Shire

=== Canada ===
- Millbank, New Brunswick, a rural community
- Millbank, Ontario, a village

=== United Kingdom ===
- Millbank, London
  - Millbank Tower, skyscraper at 21–24 Millbank
  - Millbank Prison, open 1821–86, now the location of Tate Britain art gallery
  - Millbank, metonym for MI5
- Millbank, Kent, a location in Hoath parish, England
- Millbank, County Antrim, a village in Northern Ireland
- Millbank, Aberdeenshire, a location in Scotland
- Millbank, Highland, an area of Thurso, Scotland

=== United States ===
- Millbank (Port Conway, Virginia), a historic house on the National Register of Historic Places
- Millbank (Winchester, Virginia), a historic house on the National Register of Historic Places

== Other uses ==
- SS Millbank, a British cargo steamship built in 1865
- Millbank Distillery, a former London gin distillery

== See also ==
- Milbank (disambiguation)
- Milbanke Sound, a sound on the coast of British Columbia, Canada
