= Mill Lane =

Mill Lane may refer to:

- Mill Lane J I & EY School, Hanging Heaton, Batley, England
- Mill Lane, Cambridge, England
- Mill Lane Mill, Carbrooke, Norfolk, England
- Mill Lane, Hampshire in Hampshire, England

== See also ==
- Mill Road (disambiguation)
- Mill Street (disambiguation)
