= Reformed Church of Saint-Étienne, Moudon =

Reformed Church in Moudon, canton of Vaud, Switzerland

Reformed Church of Saint-Étienne
- Église réformée Saint-Étienne (French)
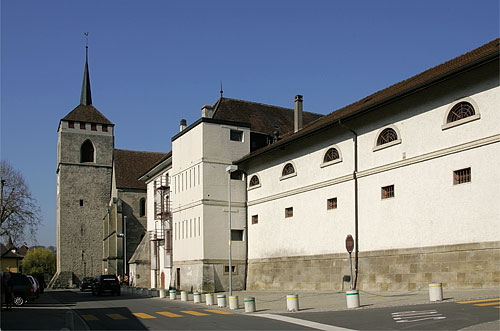

- Location within Switzerland Location within Canton of Vaud
- 46°40′06″N 06°47′56″E
- Type: Parish church of the Evangelical Reformed Church of the Canton of Vaud
- Location: Moudon, canton of Vaud, Switzerland

Site notes
- Architectural style: Gothic-inspired

Swiss Cultural Property of National Significance
- Official name: Eglise réformée Saint-Etienne
- Criteria: Class A
- Reference no.: 6301

The Reformed Church of Saint-Étienne (French: église réformée Saint-Étienne), also known as the Temple of Saint-Étienne (French: Temple de Saint-Étienne), is a Protestant church located in the municipality of Moudon, canton of Vaud, Switzerland. It is a parish church of the Evangelical Reformed Church of the Canton of Vaud. It is listed as a heritage site of national significance.

== History ==
The church of Saint-Étienne was first mentioned in 1134–1143, even though it may have been built earlier. It was situated outside the Medieval village and was the counterpart of the Chapelle Notre-Dame located on the hill. The church was nicknamed "the cathedral of Broye", a region around the Broye river, by the residents of Moudon. It was modelled after the Gothic style. After a bell tower was added in 1420, the church was enlarged and renovated between 1495 and 1499, then again between 1499 and 1502. Paintings were added to the vaults between 1506 and 1511.

After the conquest by the canton of Bern in 1536, the side altars and the statues of the church were destroyed and the building became a Reformed temple. The building was restored several times (mainly the interior) around 1563 (when a new stone communion table was added) and 1695 (new pulpit made of molasse). The organ and the current rostrums were installed in 1764.

The church was listed among the Cultural Property of National Significance.

Photographs of the nave

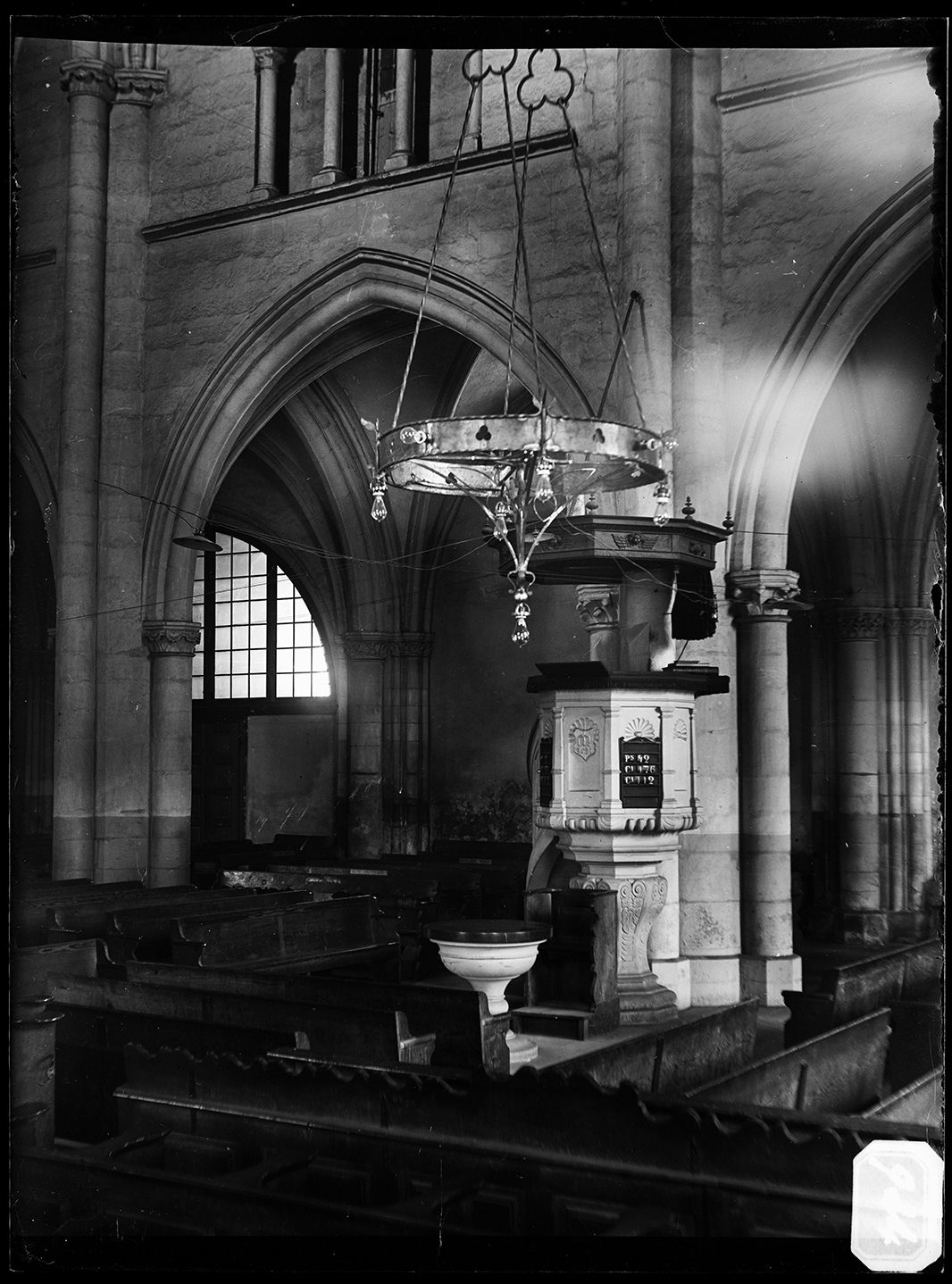
A photograph by Albert Naef, 1912

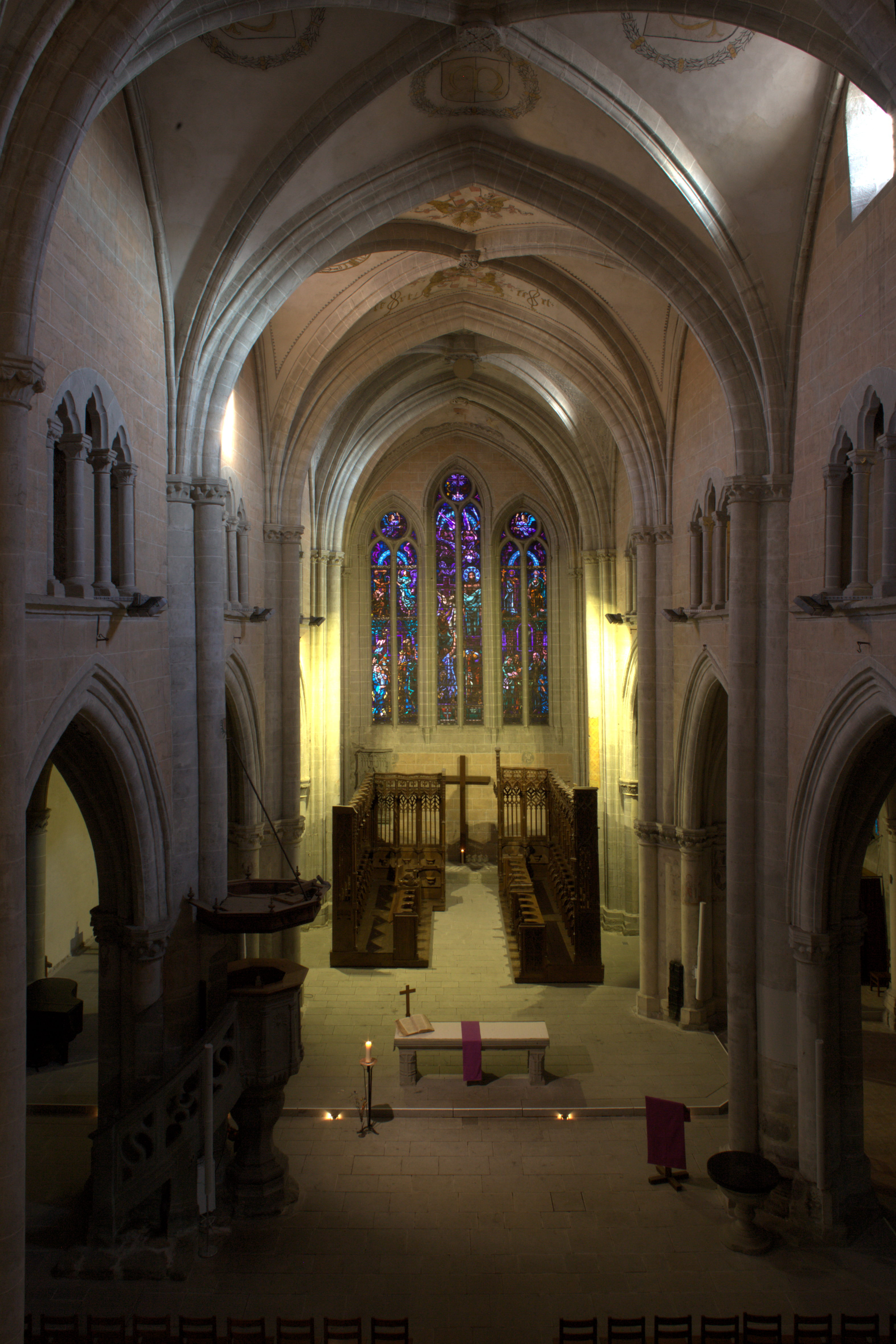
The nave

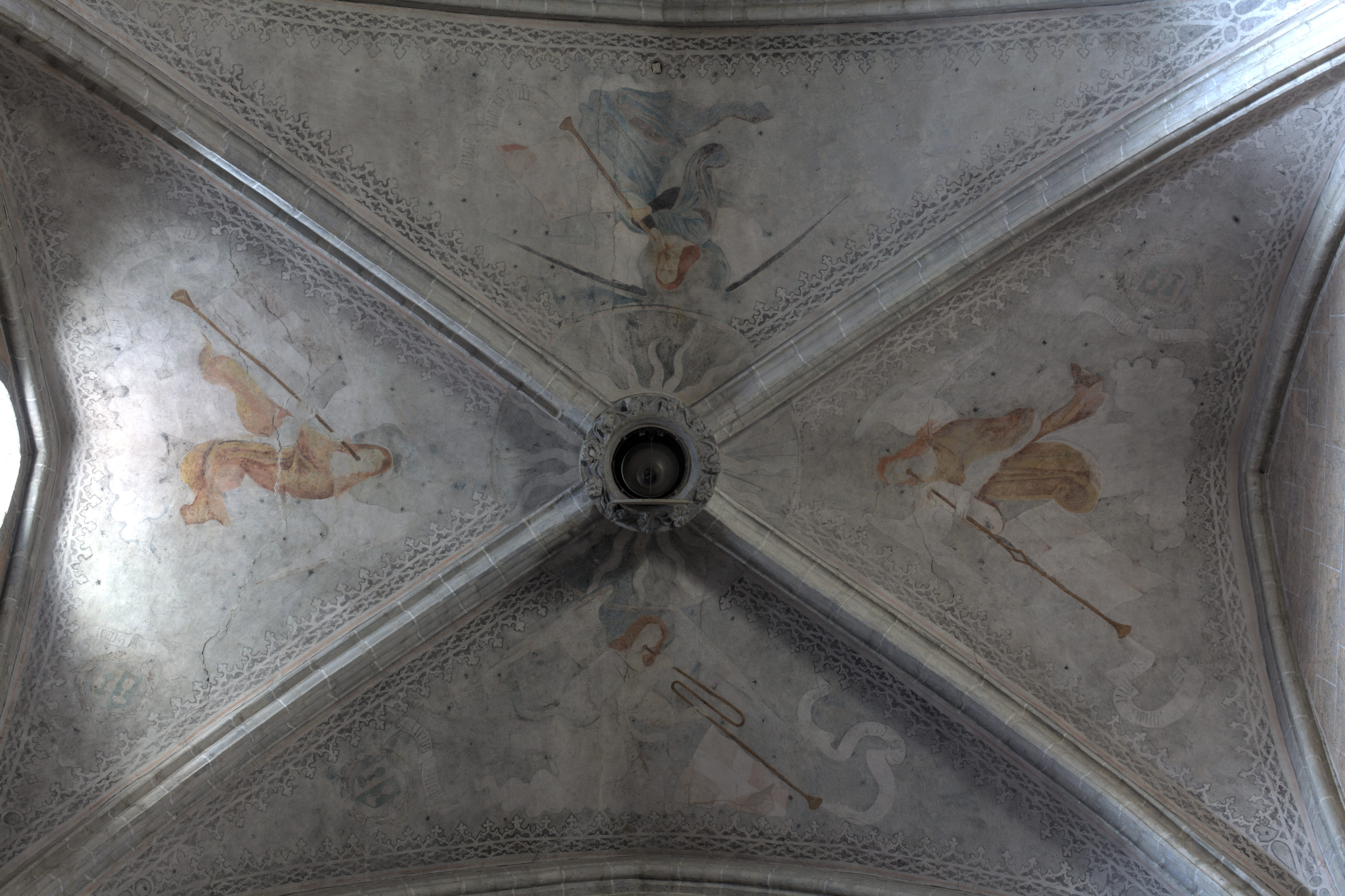
The vaults ahead of the choir

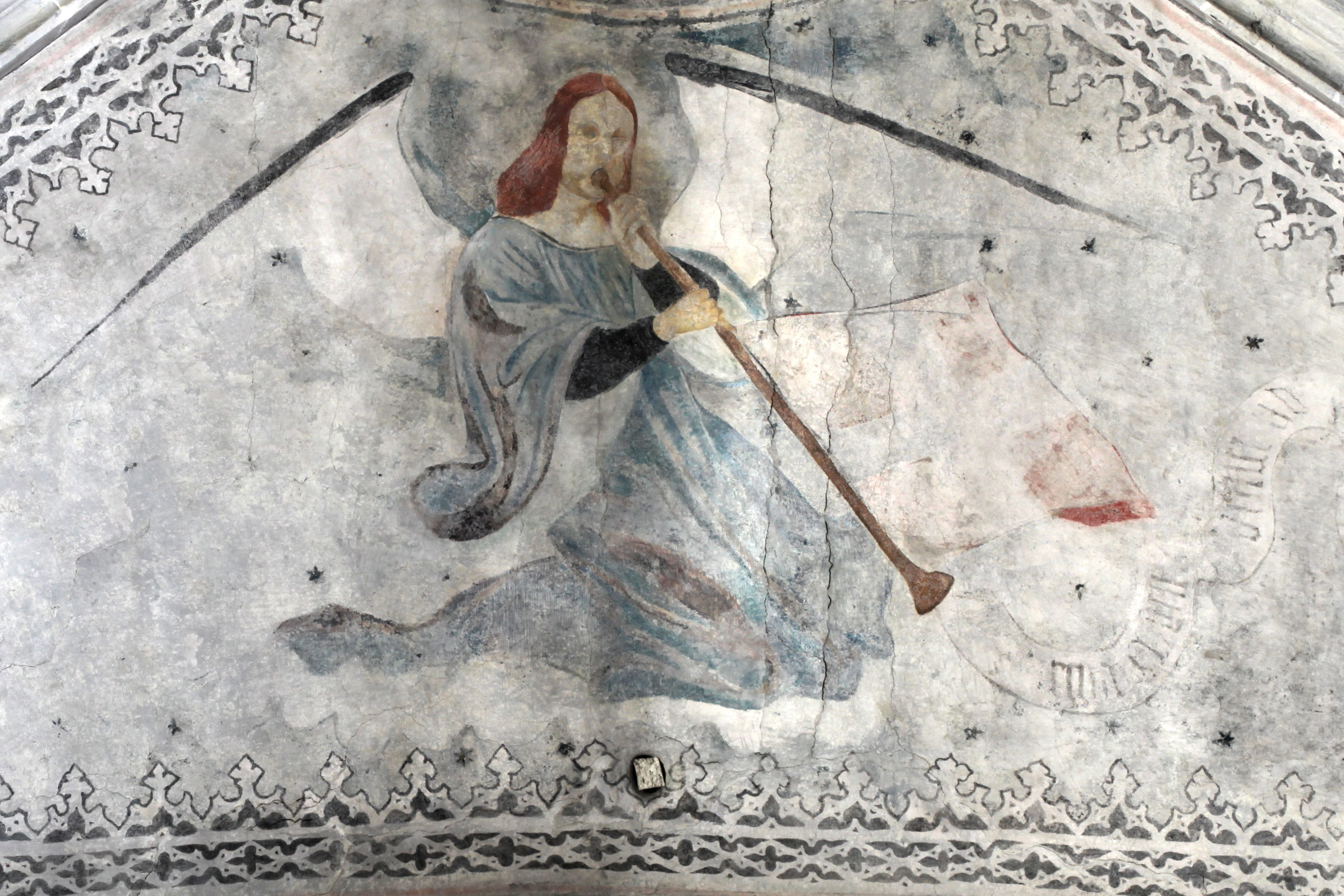
Paintings (detail)
Photographs of the organ

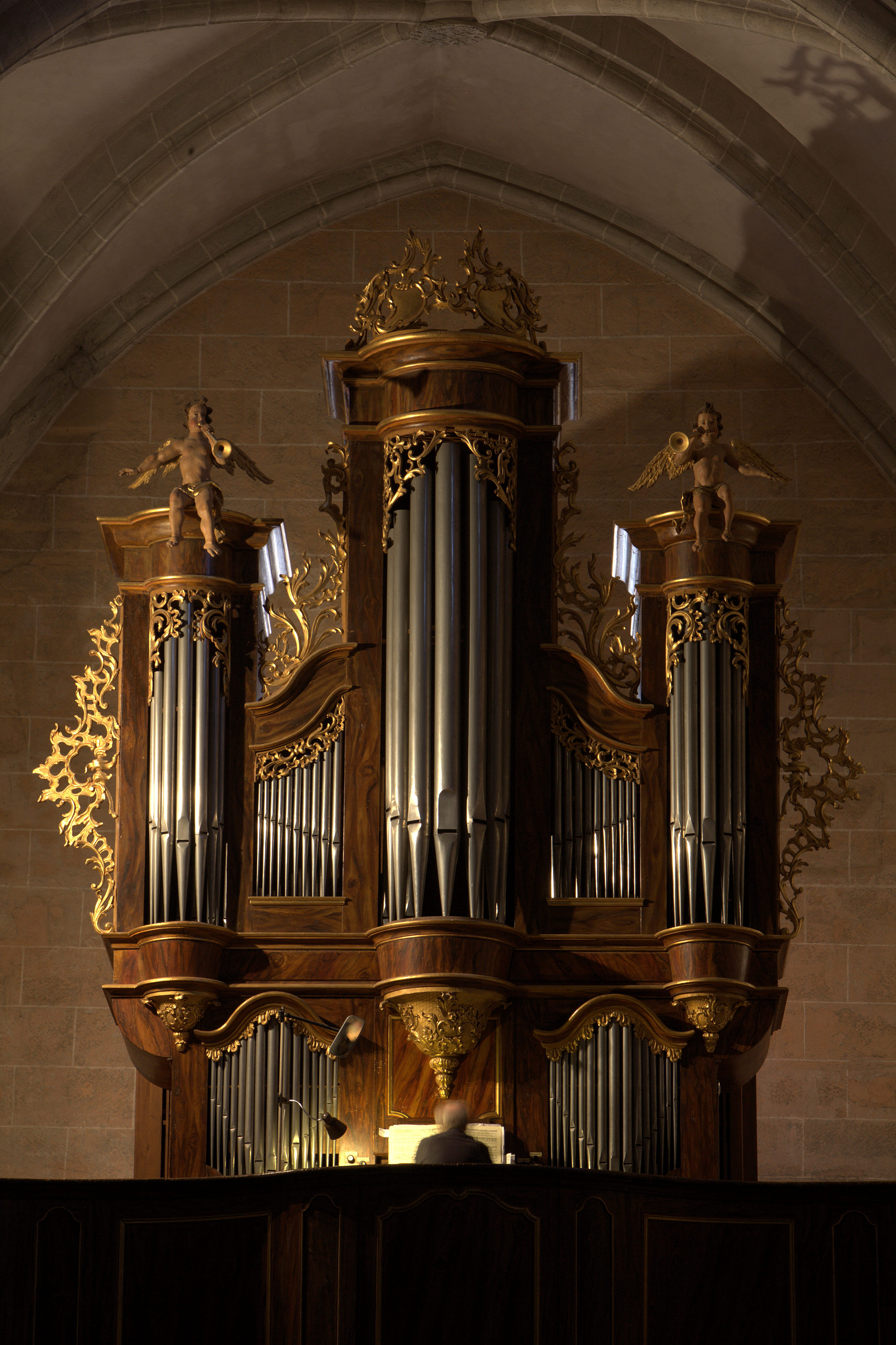
From the choir

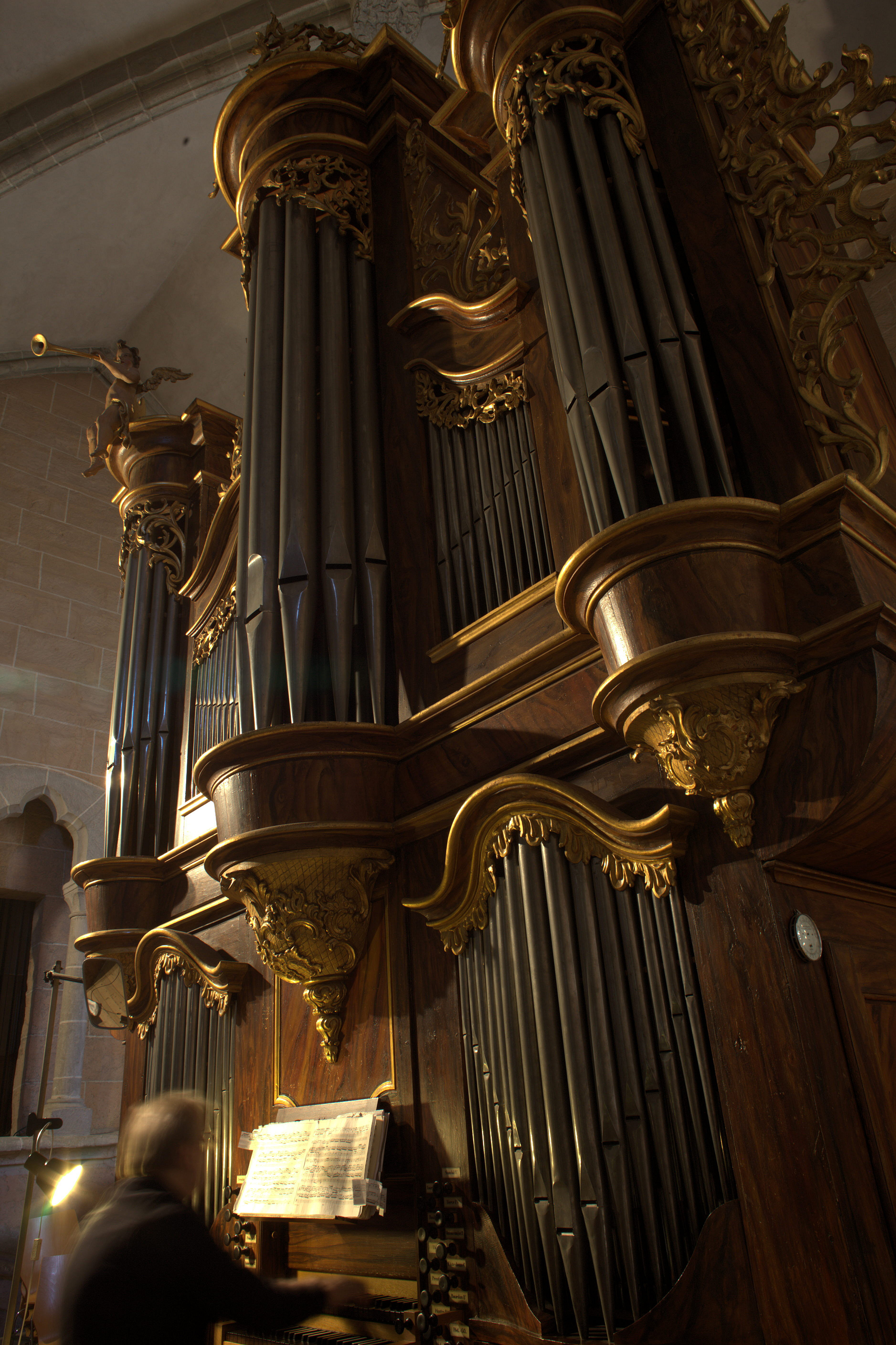
From the gallery

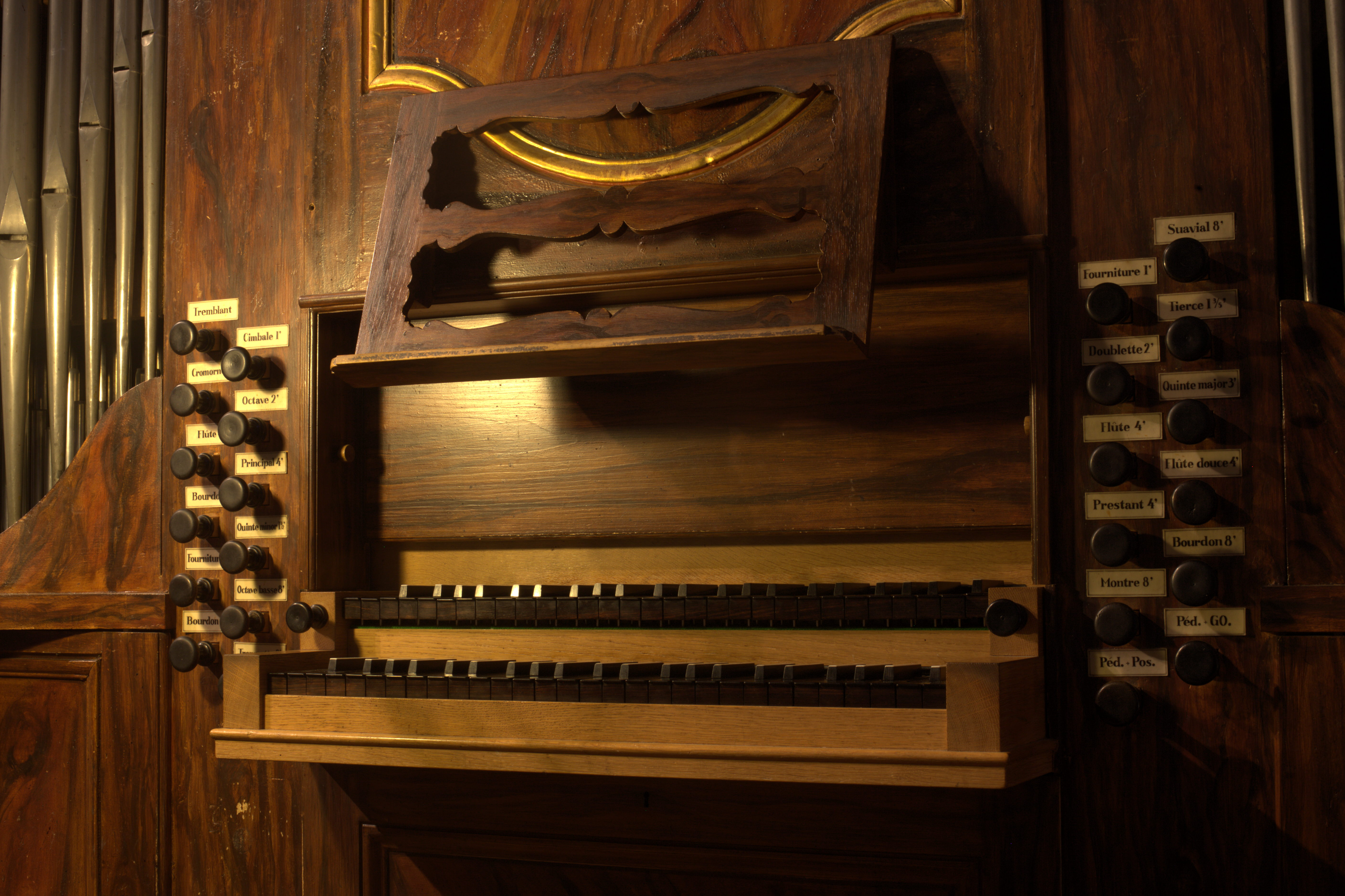
The keyboards

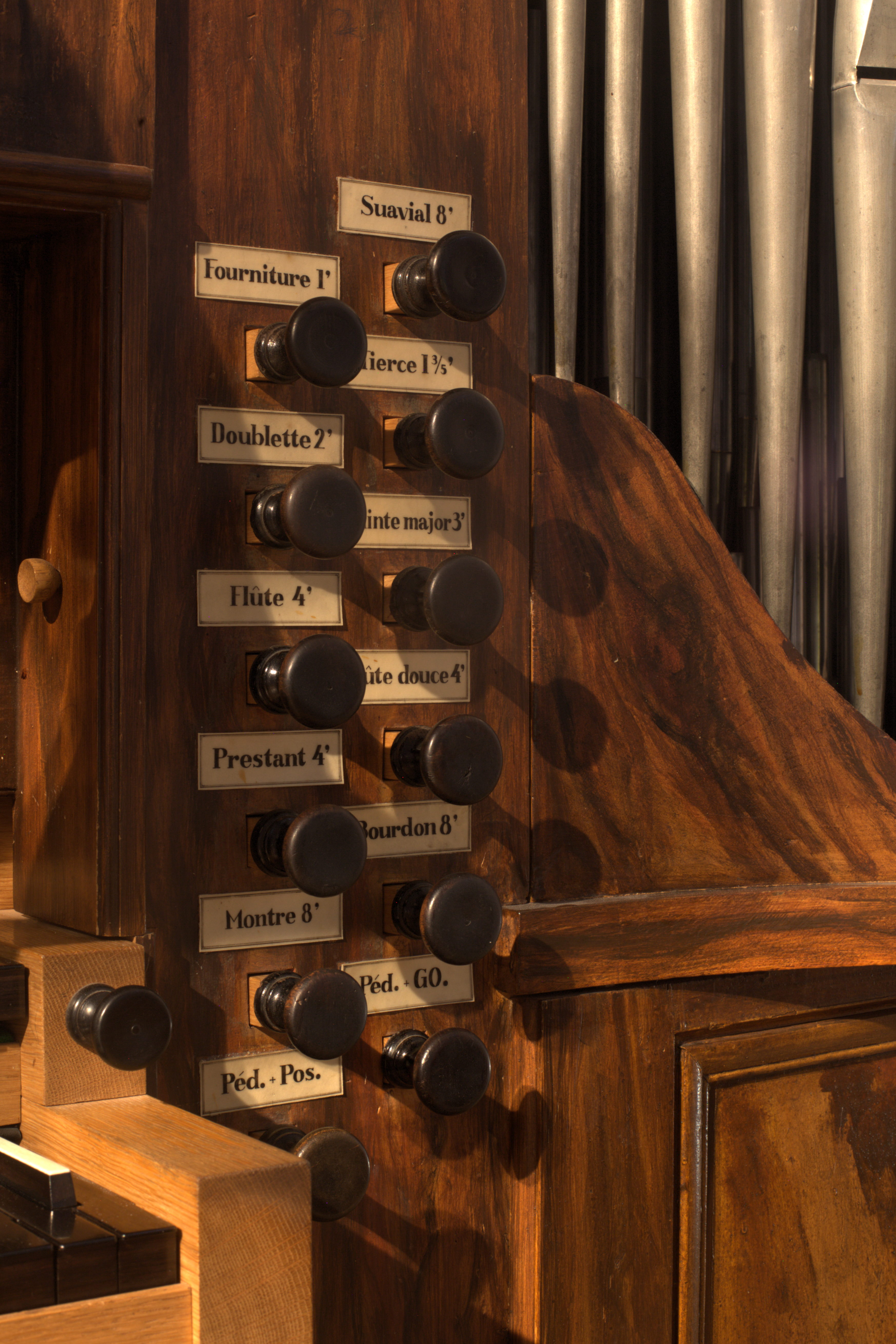
The stops

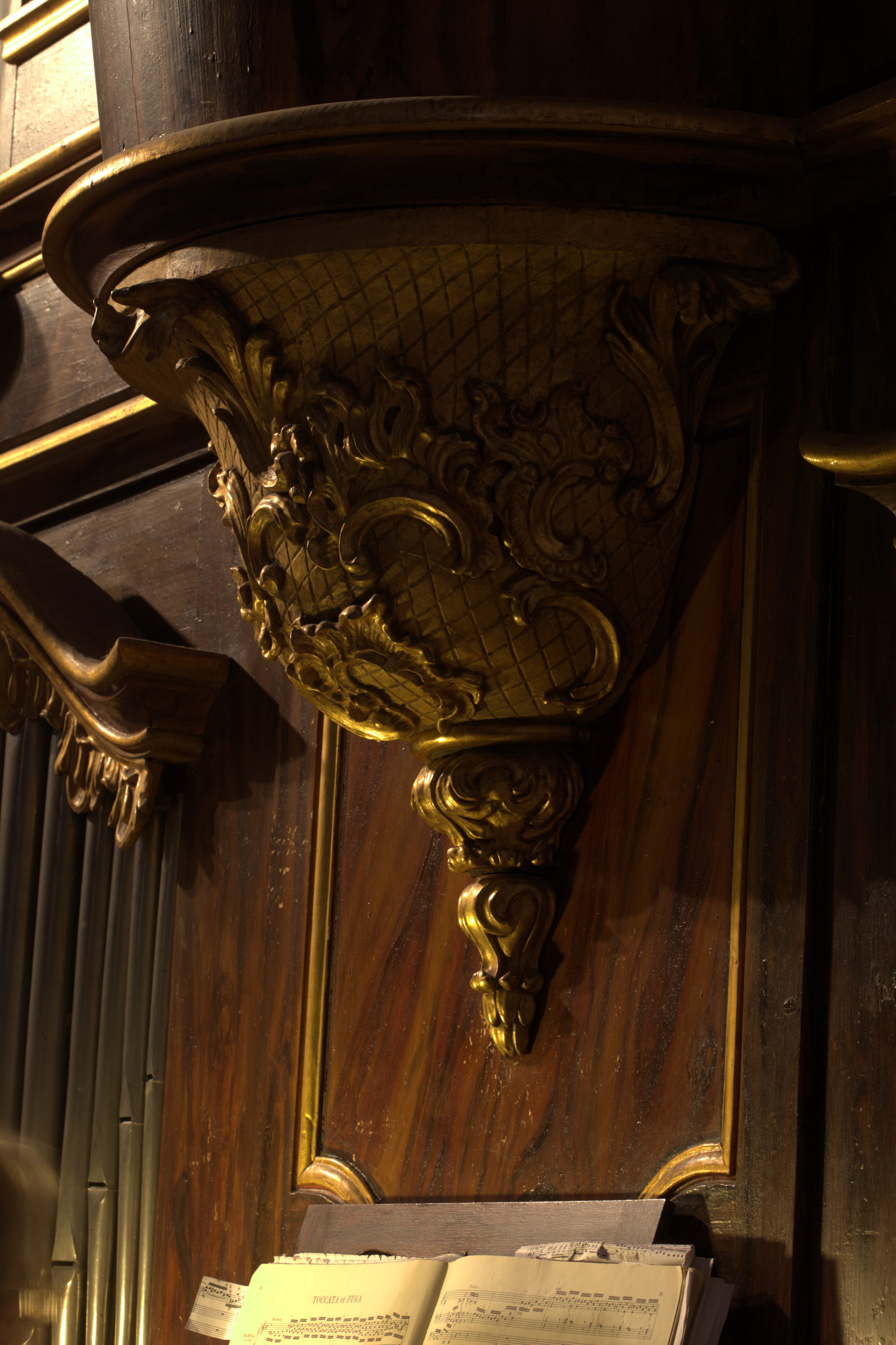
Decorative mouldings

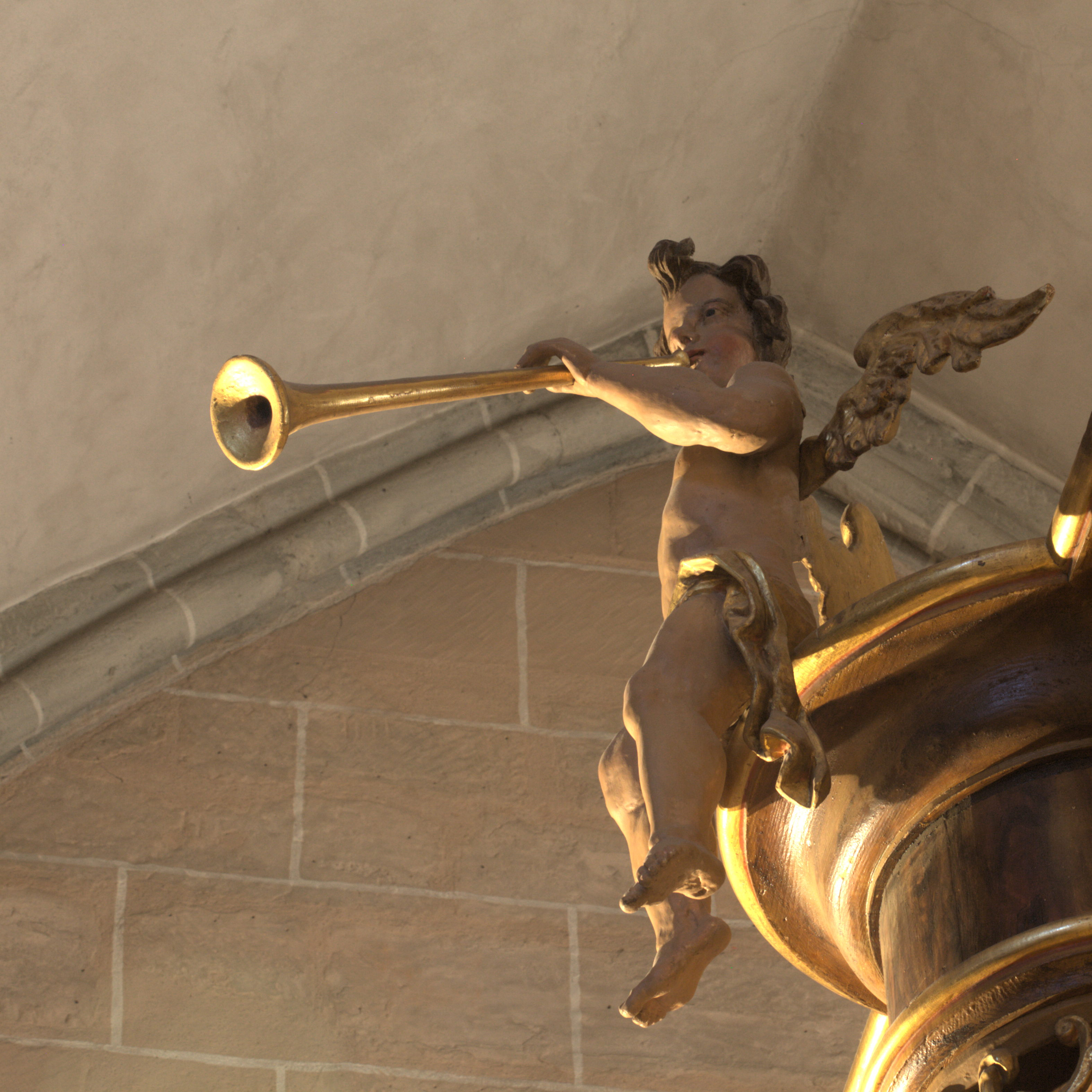
A cherub

== See also ==
- List of cultural property of national significance in Switzerland: Vaud
