= Seager Evans and Co. =

Seager Evans and Co. (established 1805) was a London-based wine and spirits company. They specialised in distillation of gin, and their most famous product was Seagers Gin.

== 19th century ==
The company was founded in 1805 as a partnership between James Lys Seager and William Evans. Both were young men, in their twenties, when the company was formed. Their first distillery was Millbank Distillery sited near the banks of the Thames in London, where it remained for over a century.

On 28 February 1832 Seager and Evans were elected as members of the Rectifier's Club. Other contemporary members of the club included well known names in the gin industry such as Booth, Gordon, Tanqueray, Nicholson and Burnett.

The original partnership ended with death of William Evans in 1856. Sir Frederick Seager Hunt, grandson of James Lys Seager, began to take an active role in the business, and eventually became sole proprietor on the death of his grandfather in 1873. Sir Frederick continued as head of the company on until 1898 when the business was sold to a public company formed for that purpose. From then on the company was Seager Evans and Company Limited.

== 20th & 21st century ==
In 1922 the distillery was moved to Deptford, and there followed thereafter a period of expansion for Seager Evans. They branched out into whisky, establishing Strathclyde Grain distillery in 1927, and founding a subsidiary, Long John International Ltd, in the same year to operate their new whisky business. They also expanded into international markets, opening a gin distillery in Chile in 1929, and another in Brazil in 1934.

The company was acquired by Schenley Industries of New York in 1956, and under new ownership the company's efforts were focused more strongly on the whisky market, with a number of investments in that sector, including the purchasing of Laphroaig in 1962.

The end of the name Seager Evans and Co. came in 1970 when the company was renamed Long John International Ltd, however Seager's Gin continues to be made in South Korea and Brazil with the UK rights acquired by El-Bart Gin (Camberwell Distillery) Company Ltd.
