= Syens =

- Municipality
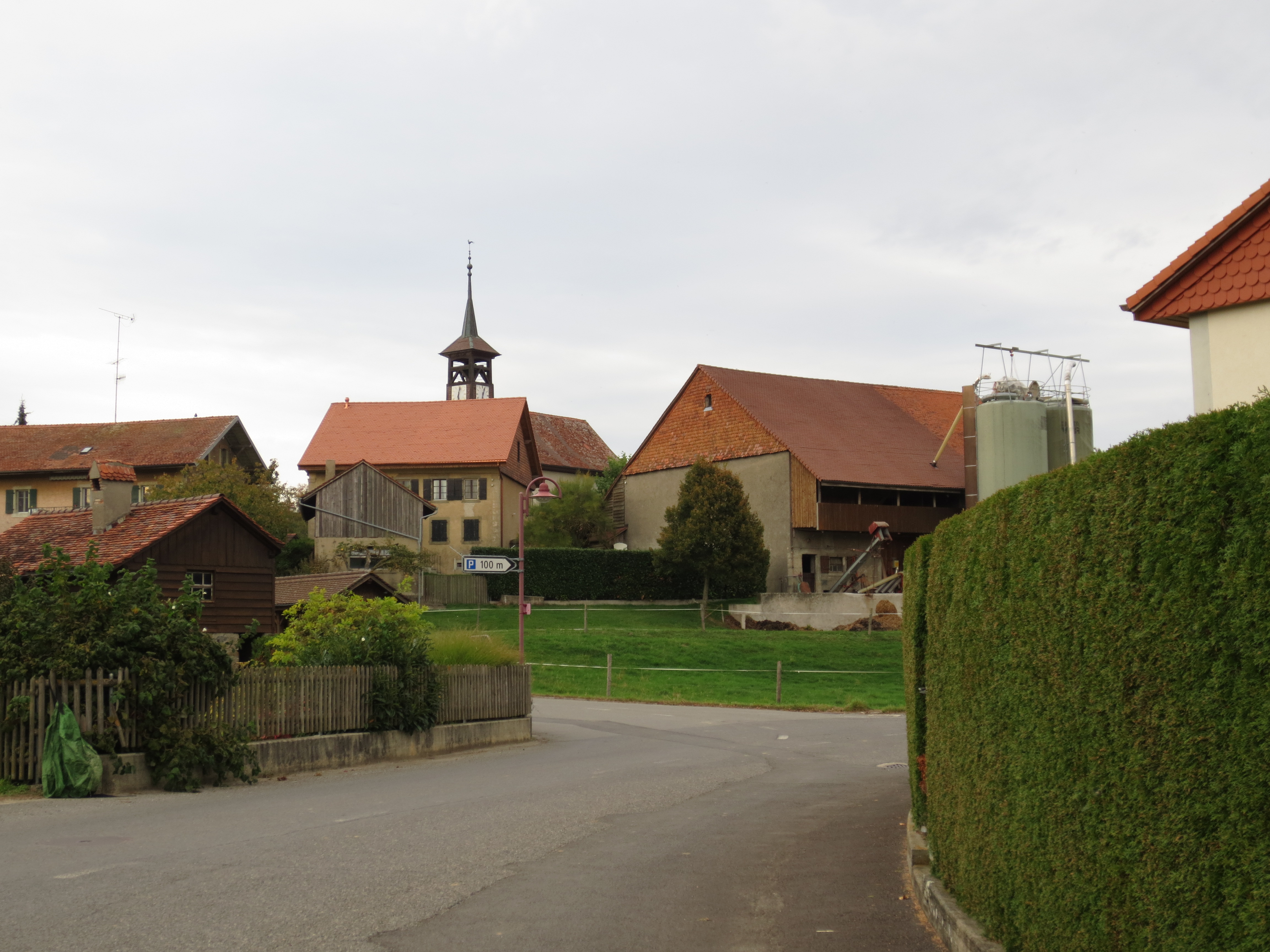

- Flag Coat of arms
- Location of Syens
- Location within Switzerland Location within Canton of Vaud
- Coordinates: 46°39′N 6°47′E
- Country: Switzerland
- Canton: Vaud
- District: Broye-Vully

Government
  - Mayor: Syndic

Area
  - Total: 2.53 km^{2} (0.98 sq mi)
- Elevation: 588 m (1,929 ft)

Population (2003)
  - Total: 141
  - Density: 55.7/km^{2} (144/sq mi)
- Time zone: UTC+01:00 (CET)
  - Summer (DST): UTC+02:00 (CEST)
- Postal code: 1510
- SFOS number: 5688
- ISO 3166 code: CH-VD
- Surrounded by: Hermenches, Moudon, Rossenges, Vucherens, Vulliens
- Website: www.syens.ch

Syens is a municipality in the district of Broye-Vully in the canton of Vaud in Switzerland.

== History ==
Syens is first mentioned in 1018 as Ciens.

== Geography ==
Aerial view (1964)

Syens has an area, as of 2009, of 2.5 square kilometers (0.97 mi^{2}). Of this area, 1.39 km^{2} (0.54 mi^{2}) or 55.2% is used for agricultural purposes, while 0.84 km^{2} (0.32 mi^{2}) or 33.3% is forested. Of the rest of the land, 0.28 km^{2} (0.11 mi^{2}) or 11.1% is settled (buildings or roads).

Of the built up area, housing and buildings made up 3.2% and transportation infrastructure made up 7.1%. Out of the forested land, all of the forested land area is covered with heavy forests. Of the agricultural land, 44.0% is used for growing crops and 10.7% is pastures.

The municipality was part of the Moudon District until it was dissolved on 31 August 2006, and Syens became part of the new district of Broye-Vully.

The municipality is located south of Moudon. It consists of the village of Syens and the hamlet of Bressonnaz.

== Coat of arms ==
The blazon of the municipal coat of arms is Gyrrony of Eight, a Buch Or, in chief a Mullet of Five of the same.

== Demographics ==
Syens has a population (as of December 2020) of 156. As of 2008, 15.7% of the population are resident foreign nationals. Over the last 10 years (1999–2009 ) the population has changed at a rate of 0.8%. It has changed at a rate of -2.3% due to migration and at a rate of 5.5% due to births and deaths.

Most of the population (as of 2000) speaks French (101 or 86.3%), with German being second most common (10 or 8.5%) and English being third (2 or 1.7%).

Of the population in the municipality 30 or about 25.6% were born in Syens and lived there in 2000. There were 40 or 34.2% who were born in the same canton, while 24 or 20.5% were born somewhere else in Switzerland, and 23 or 19.7% were born outside of Switzerland.

In 2008 there were 2 live births to Swiss citizens and 1 death of a Swiss citizen. Ignoring immigration and emigration, the population of Swiss citizens increased by 1 while the foreign population remained the same. At the same time, there was 1 non-Swiss man who emigrated from Switzerland to another country. The total Swiss population change in 2008 (from all sources, including moves across municipal borders) was a decrease of 1 and the non-Swiss population increased by 1 people. This represents a population growth rate of 0.0%.

The age distribution, as of 2009, in Syens is; 7 children or 5.4% of the population are between 0 and 9 years old and 15 teenagers or 11.6% are between 10 and 19. Of the adult population, 19 people or 14.7% of the population are between 20 and 29 years old. 18 people or 14.0% are between 30 and 39, 18 people or 14.0% are between 40 and 49, and 22 people or 17.1% are between 50 and 59. The senior population distribution is 17 people or 13.2% of the population are between 60 and 69 years old, 8 people or 6.2% are between 70 and 79, there are 4 people or 3.1% who are between 80 and 89, and there is 1 person who is 90 and older.

As of 2000, there were 43 people who were single and never married in the municipality. There were 60 married individuals, 7 widows or widowers and 7 individuals who are divorced.

As of 2000, there were 53 private households in the municipality, and an average of 2.2 persons per household. There were 16 households that consist of only one person and 1 households with five or more people. Out of a total of 53 households that answered this question, 30.2% were households made up of just one person. Of the rest of the households, there are 20 married couples without children, 16 married couples with children There was one single parent with a child or children.

In 2000 there were 22 single family homes (or 52.4% of the total) out of a total of 42 inhabited buildings. There were 3 multi-family buildings (7.1%), along with 13 multi-purpose buildings that were mostly used for housing (31.0%) and 4 other use buildings (commercial or industrial) that also had some housing (9.5%). Of the single family homes 13 were built before 1919, while 3 were built between 1990 and 2000. The greatest number of multi-family homes (1) were built before 1919 and again between 1991 and 1995

In 2000 there were 59 apartments in the municipality. The most common apartment size was 3 rooms of which there were 16. There were 1 single room apartments and 25 apartments with five or more rooms. Of these apartments, a total of 52 apartments (88.1% of the total) were permanently occupied, while 2 apartments (3.4%) were seasonally occupied and 5 apartments (8.5%) were empty. As of 2009, the construction rate of new housing units was 7.8 new units per 1000 residents. The vacancy rate for the municipality, in 2010, was 1.67%.

The historical population is given in the following chart:

== Politics ==
In the 2007 federal election the most popular party was the SVP which received 28.98% of the vote. The next three most popular parties were the FDP (23.35%), the Green Party (15.45%) and the CVP (9.82%). In the federal election, a total of 48 votes were cast, and the voter turnout was 54.5%.

== Economy ==
As of 2010, Syens had an unemployment rate of 0.3%. As of 2008, there were 10 people employed in the primary economic sector and about 5 businesses involved in this sector. 15 people were employed in the secondary sector and there were 3 businesses in this sector. No one was employed in the tertiary sector. There were 65 residents of the municipality who were employed in some capacity, of which females made up 43.1% of the workforce.

In 2008 the total number of full-time equivalent jobs was 22. The number of jobs in the primary sector was 7, all of which were in agriculture. The number of jobs in the secondary sector was 15 of which 5 or (33.3%) were in manufacturing and 10 (66.7%) were in construction. The number of jobs in the tertiary sector was . In the tertiary sector; .

In 2000, there were 18 workers who commuted into the municipality and 47 workers who commuted away. The municipality is a net exporter of workers, with about 2.6 workers leaving the municipality for every one entering. Of the working population, 10.8% used public transportation to get to work, and 61.5% used a private car.

== Religion ==
From the 2000 census, 29 or 24.8% were Roman Catholic, while 58 or 49.6% belonged to the Swiss Reformed Church. Of the rest of the population, there were 12 individuals (or about 10.26% of the population) who belonged to another Christian church. There were 2 individuals who were Buddhist. 19 (or about 16.24% of the population) belonged to no church, are agnostic or atheist, and 2 individuals (or about 1.71% of the population) did not answer the question.

== Education ==
In Syens about 47 or (40.2%) of the population have completed non-mandatory upper secondary education, and 29 or (24.8%) have completed additional higher education (either university or a Fachhochschule). Of the 29 who completed tertiary schooling, 37.9% were Swiss men, 41.4% were Swiss women.

In the 2009/2010 school year there were a total of 12 students in the Syens school district. In the Vaud cantonal school system, two years of non-obligatory pre-school are provided by the political districts. During the school year, the political district provided pre-school care for a total of 155 children of which 83 children (53.5%) received subsidized pre-school care. The canton's primary school program requires students to attend for four years. There were 4 students in the municipal primary school program. The obligatory lower secondary school program lasts for six years and there were 8 students in those schools.

As of 2000, there were 23 students from Syens who attended schools outside the municipality.
