= List of United Kingdom locations: Mill =

The United Kingdom

This is part of the list of United Kingdom locations: a gazetteer of place names in the United Kingdom showing each place's locality and geographical coordinates.

== Mill ==
Location	Locality	Coordinates (links to map & photo sources)	OS grid reference
Milland	West Sussex	51.02°N 00.81°W	SU8326
Millarston	Renfrewshire	55.83°N 04.46°W	NS4663
Millbank	Aberdeenshire	57.08°N 02.24°W	NO8599
Millbank	Highland	58.58°N 03.53°W	ND1167
Millbank	Kent	51.34°N 01.15°E	TR2065
Mill Bank	Calderdale	53.68°N 01.95°W	SE0321
Millbeck	Cumbria	54.62°N 03.16°W	NY2526
Millbounds	Orkney Islands	59.20°N 02.77°W	HY5635
Millbreck	Aberdeenshire	57.49°N 02.00°W	NK0045
Millbridge	Surrey	51.17°N 00.79°W	SU8442
Millbrook	Bedfordshire	52.03°N 00.52°W	TL0138
Millbrook	Cornwall	50.34°N 04.22°W	SX4252
Millbrook (North Molton)	Devon	51.05°N 03.78°W	SS7530
Millbrook (Axminster)	Devon	50.77°N 02.99°W	SY3098
Millbrook	City of Southampton	50.91°N 01.46°W	SU3813
Millbrook	Tameside	53.48°N 02.03°W	SJ9899
Mill Brow	Stockport	53.39°N 02.04°W	SJ9789
Mill Common	Norfolk	52.55°N 01.42°E	TG3201
Mill Corner	East Sussex	50.97°N 00.59°E	TQ8223
Millcraig	Highland	57.70°N 04.26°W	NH6571
Milldale	Staffordshire	53.08°N 01.80°W	SK1354
Mill Dam	North Yorkshire	54.09°N 02.49°W	SD6867
Mill Dam	South Tyneside	54.98°N 01.45°W	NZ3566
Millden	Aberdeenshire	57.23°N 02.06°W	NJ9616
Milldens	Angus	56.64°N 02.75°W	NO5450
Millend (North Nibley)	Gloucestershire	51.66°N 02.36°W	ST7596
Millend (Eastington, Stroud district)	Gloucestershire	51.74°N 02.32°W	SO7805
Millend	Oxfordshire	51.89°N 01.53°W	SP3222
Mill End	Buckinghamshire	51.55°N 00.87°W	SU7885
Mill End	Cambridgeshire	52.17°N 00.47°E	TL6956
Mill End	Gloucestershire	51.82°N 01.84°W	SP1114
Mill End	North Hertfordshire	51.97°N 00.06°W	TL3332
Mill End	Rickmansworth	51.63°N 00.49°W	TQ0494
Mill End Green	Essex	51.90°N 00.33°E	TL6126
Millendreath	Cornwall	50.36°N 04.44°W	SX2654
Millerhill	Midlothian	55.90°N 03.08°W	NT3269
Miller's Dale	Derbyshire	53.25°N 01.79°W	SK1473
Miller's Green	Essex	51.73°N 00.30°E	TL5907
Millers Green	Derbyshire	53.06°N 01.58°W	SK2852
Millersneuk	North Lanarkshire	55.91°N 04.14°W	NS6671
Millerston	City of Glasgow	55.87°N 04.17°W	NS6467
Milleur Point	Dumfries and Galloway	55.01°N 05.10°W	NX017733
Millfield	Aberdeenshire	57.05°N 02.85°W	NO4896
Millfield	Cambridgeshire	52.58°N 00.25°W	TF1800
Millfield	Sunderland	54.90°N 01.40°W	NZ3857
Millfordhope	Kent	51.39°N 00.67°E	TQ859691
Millgate	Lancashire	53.66°N 02.18°W	SD8819
Millgate	Norfolk	52.79°N 01.24°E	TG1927
Millgillhead	Cumbria	54.56°N 03.44°W	NY0720
Mill Green	Cambridgeshire	52.07°N 00.36°E	TL6245
Mill Green	Essex	51.68°N 00.37°E	TL6401
Mill Green	Hampshire	51.36°N 01.25°W	SU5263
Mill Green	Hertfordshire	51.76°N 00.20°W	TL2409
Mill Green	Norfolk	52.41°N 01.13°E	TM1384
Mill Green	Shropshire	52.84°N 02.47°W	SJ6828
Mill Green (Babergh Mill)	Suffolk	52.04°N 00.84°E	TL9542
Mill Green (Buxhall)	Suffolk	52.17°N 00.90°E	TL9957
Mill Green (Stonham Aspal)	Suffolk	52.19°N 01.11°E	TM1360
Mill Green	Walsall	52.60°N 01.89°W	SK0701
Millhalf	Herefordshire	52.12°N 03.06°W	SO2748
Millhall	Kent	51.30°N 00.46°E	TQ7259
Millhayes (Hemyock)	Devon	50.91°N 03.23°W	ST1314
Millhayes (Stockland)	Devon	50.82°N 03.09°W	ST2303
Millhead	Lancashire	54.13°N 02.78°W	SD4971
Millheugh	South Lanarkshire	55.73°N 03.99°W	NS7551
Mill Hill	Barnet	51.61°N 00.23°W	TQ2292
Mill Hill	Bolton	53.57°N 02.42°W	SD7209
Mill Hill	Devon	50.54°N 04.18°W	SX4574
Mill Hill	East Sussex	50.82°N 00.29°E	TQ6205
Mill Hill	Essex	51.60°N 00.62°E	TQ8293
Mill Hill	Gloucestershire	51.75°N 02.58°W	SO6006
Mill Hill	Kent	51.20°N 01.37°E	TR3651
Mill Hill	Lancashire	53.72°N 02.51°W	SD6626
Mill Hill	Lincolnshire	53.16°N 00.28°E	TF5365
Mill Hill	Suffolk	52.12°N 00.70°E	TL8551
Mill Hills	Suffolk	52.09°N 01.31°E	TM2749
Mill Hirst	North Yorkshire	54.03°N 01.71°W	SE1960
Millholme	Cumbria	54.30°N 02.67°W	SD5690
Millhouse	Argyll and Bute	55.87°N 05.27°W	NR9570
Millhouse	Cumbria	54.72°N 02.99°W	NY3637
Millhousebridge	Dumfries and Galloway	55.15°N 03.41°W	NY1085
Millhouse Green	Barnsley	53.52°N 01.68°W	SE2103
Millhouses	Barnsley	53.53°N 01.36°W	SE4204
Millhouses	Sheffield	53.34°N 01.52°W	SK3283
Millikenpark	Renfrewshire	55.82°N 04.54°W	NS4162
Millin Cross	Pembrokeshire	51.77°N 04.91°W	SM9913
Millington	East Riding of Yorkshire	53.94°N 00.73°W	SE8351
Millington Green	Derbyshire	53.02°N 01.61°W	SK2647
Mill Knowe	Argyll and Bute	55.42°N 05.62°W	NR7121
Mill Lane	Hampshire	51.24°N 00.88°W	SU7850
Mill Meads	Tower Hamlets	51.52°N 00.01°W	TQ3883
Millmeece	Staffordshire	52.89°N 02.25°W	SJ8333
Millmoor	Devon	50.91°N 03.28°W	ST1014
Millnain	Highland	57.59°N 04.51°W	NH5059
Millness	Cumbria	54.23°N 02.72°W	SD5382
Mill of Brighty	Angus	56.53°N 02.91°W	NO4438
Mill of Echt	Aberdeenshire	57.13°N 02.44°W	NJ7305
Mill of Haldane	West Dunbartonshire	55.99°N 04.56°W	NS4081
Mill of Kincardine	Aberdeenshire	56.86°N 02.54°W	NO6775
Mill of Marcus	Angus	56.72°N 02.80°W	NO5159
Mill of Monquich	Aberdeenshire	57.04°N 02.24°W	NO8595
Mill of Pitcaple	Aberdeenshire	57.32°N 02.45°W	NJ7326
Mill of Rango	Orkney Islands	59.04°N 03.29°W	HY2618
Millom	Cumbria	54.20°N 03.27°W	SD1780
Millook	Cornwall	50.76°N 04.58°W	SX1899
Millow	Bedfordshire	52.07°N 00.22°W	TL2243
Mill Park	Argyll and Bute	55.32°N 05.62°W	NR7009
Mill Place	North Lincolnshire	53.54°N 00.52°W	SE9806
Millpool (Breage)	Cornwall	50.12°N 05.40°W	SW5730
Millpool (Cardinham)	Cornwall	50.49°N 04.65°W	SX1270
Millport	North Ayrshire	55.75°N 04.93°W	NS1655
Mills	Fife	56.30°N 03.06°W	NO3413
Mill Shaw	Leeds	53.76°N 01.57°W	SE2830
Mill Side	Cumbria	54.24°N 02.86°W	SD4484
Mill Street	Kent	51.28°N 00.42°E	TQ6957
Mill Street	Norfolk	52.71°N 01.03°E	TG0517
Mill Street	Suffolk	51.99°N 00.88°E	TL9837
Millthorpe	Derbyshire	53.28°N 01.53°W	SK3176
Millthorpe	Lincolnshire	52.85°N 00.35°W	TF1130
Mill Throop	Bournemouth	50.75°N 01.85°W	SZ1095
Millthrop	Cumbria	54.31°N 02.52°W	SD6691
Milltimber	City of Aberdeen	57.10°N 02.24°W	NJ8501
Milltown (near Lostwithiel)	Cornwall	50.38°N 04.67°W	SX1057
Milltown (Cardinham)	Cornwall	50.48°N 04.66°W	SX1168
Milltown	Derbyshire	53.14°N 01.47°W	SK3561
Milltown	Devon	51.12°N 04.07°W	SS5538
Milltown	Highland	57.41°N 05.83°W	NG7043
Milltown of Aberdalgie	Perth and Kinross	56.36°N 03.50°W	NO0720
Milltown of Auchindoun	Moray	57.44°N 03.08°W	NJ3540
Milltown of Edinvillie	Moray	57.44°N 03.23°W	NJ2640
Milltown of Kildrummy	Aberdeenshire	57.23°N 02.89°W	NJ4616
Milltown of Rothiemay	Moray	57.52°N 02.76°W	NJ5448
Millwall	Tower Hamlets	51.49°N 00.02°W	TQ3779
Millway Rise	Devon	50.78°N 02.99°W	SY3099
