= Rossenges =

- Municipality
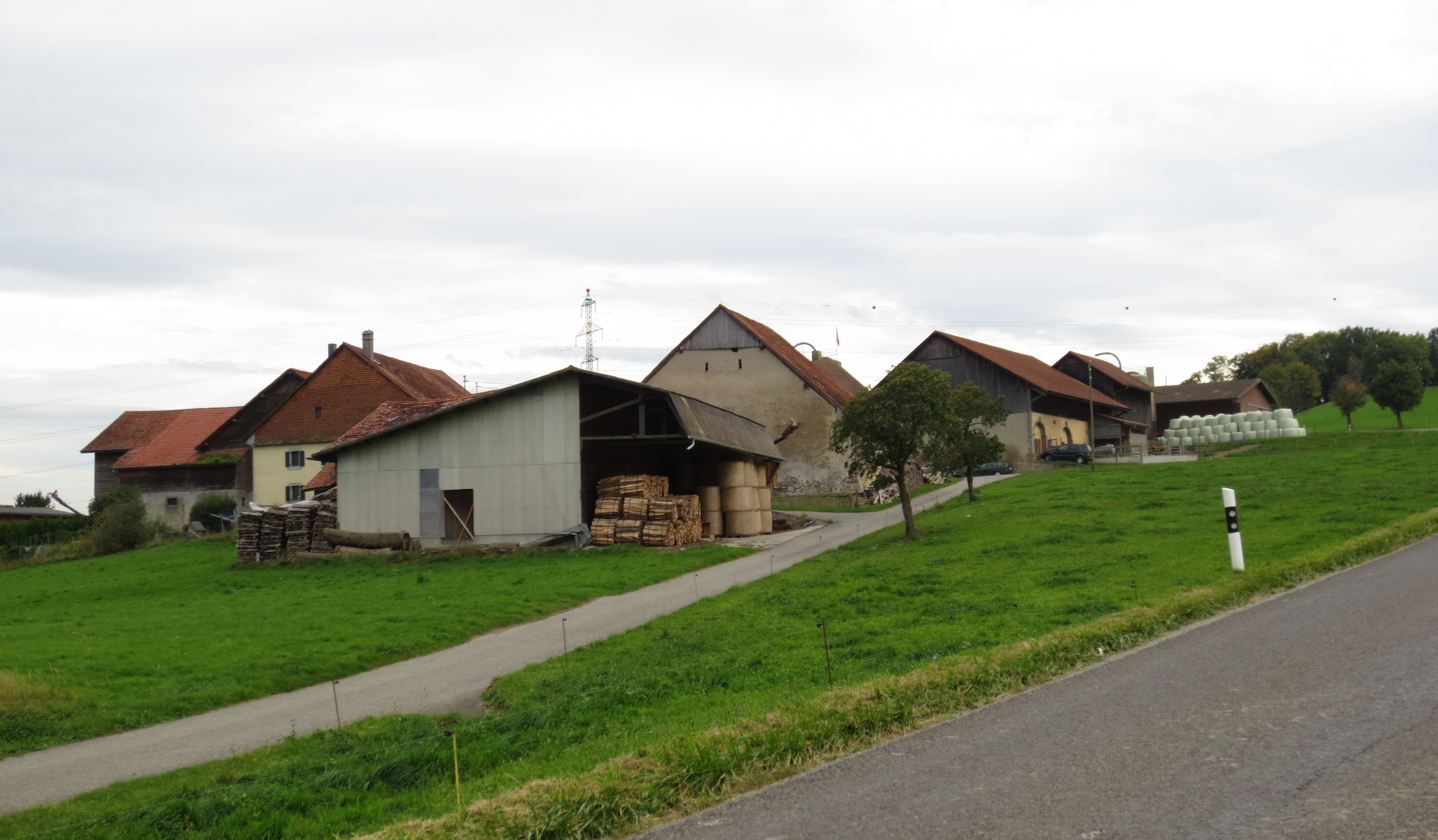

- Flag Coat of arms
- Location of Rossenges
- Location within Switzerland Location within Canton of Vaud
- Coordinates: 46°39′N 6°47′E
- Country: Switzerland
- Canton: Vaud
- District: Broye-Vully

Government
  - Mayor: Syndic

Area
  - Total: 1.07 km^{2} (0.41 sq mi)
- Elevation: 662 m (2,172 ft)

Population (2003)
  - Total: 60
  - Density: 56/km^{2} (150/sq mi)
- Time zone: UTC+01:00 (CET)
  - Summer (DST): UTC+02:00 (CEST)
- Postal code: 1513
- SFOS number: 5684
- ISO 3166 code: CH-VD
- Surrounded by: Hermenches, Moudon, Syens
- Website: https://rossenges.ch/ Profile (in French), SFSO statistics

Rossenges is a municipality in the district of Broye-Vully of the canton of Vaud in Switzerland.

The municipality of Rossenges is considering a merger at a date in the future into the municipality of Moudon.

== History ==
Rossenges is first mentioned in 1309 as Rossenge. It was also often mentioned as L'Abbaye de Rossenges.

== Geography ==
Rossenges has an area, as of 2009, of 1.07 square kilometers (0.41 sq mi). Of this area, 0.98 km^{2} (0.38 sq mi) or 91.6% is used for agricultural purposes, while 0.04 km^{2} (0.015 sq mi) or 3.7% is forested. Of the rest of the land, 0.05 km^{2} (12 acres) or 4.7% is settled (buildings or roads).

Of the built up area, housing and buildings made up 2.8% and transportation infrastructure made up 0.9%. Out of the forested land, all of the forested land area is covered with heavy forests. Of the agricultural land, 59.8% is used for growing crops and 31.8% is pastures.

The municipality was part of the Moudon District until it was dissolved on 31 August 2006, and Rossenges became part of the new district of Broye-Vully.

The municipality is located on the left bank of the Bressonne, southwest of Moudon. It consists of the hamlets of Rossenges and L'Abbaye.

== Coat of arms ==
The blazon of the municipal coat of arms is Per fess Gules and Vert, two Rows of Houses Argent.

== Demographics ==
Rossenges has a population (as of December 2020) of 84. As of 2008, 8.9% of the population are resident foreign nationals. Over the last 10 years (1999–2009) the population has changed at a rate of 29.4%. It has changed at a rate of 23.5% due to migration and at a rate of 5.9% due to births and deaths.

Most of the population (as of 2000) speaks French (48 or 94.1%) with the rest speaking German.

Of the population in the municipality 28 or about 54.9% were born in Rossenges and lived there in 2000. There were 14 or 27.5% who were born in the same canton, while 9 or 17.6% were born somewhere else in Switzerland, and 0 were born outside of Switzerland.

In 2008 there were 3 live births to Swiss citizens and 1 death of a Swiss citizen. Ignoring immigration and emigration, the population of Swiss citizens increased by 2 while the foreign population remained the same. There were 2 non-Swiss women who immigrated from another country to Switzerland. The total Swiss population change in 2008 (from all sources, including moves across municipal borders) was an increase of 3 and the non-Swiss population increased by 2 people. This represents a population growth rate of 9.8%.

The age distribution, as of 2009, in Rossenges is; 9 children or 13.6% of the population are between 0 and 9 years old and 16 teenagers or 24.2% are between 10 and 19. Of the adult population, 6 people or 9.1% of the population are between 20 and 29 years old. 7 people or 10.6% are between 30 and 39, 10 people or 15.2% are between 40 and 49, and 8 people or 12.1% are between 50 and 59. The senior population distribution is 5 people or 7.6% of the population are between 60 and 69 years old, 4 people or 6.1% are between 70 and 79, there is 1 person who is 80 and 89.

As of 2000, there were 25 people who were single and never married in the municipality. There were 26 married individuals, widows or widowers and individuals who are divorced.

As of 2000, there were 18 private households in the municipality, and an average of 2.8 persons per household. There were 6 households that consist of only one person and 5 households with five or more people. Out of a total of 18 households that answered this question, 33.3% were households made up of just one person. Of the rest of the households, there are 5 married couples without children, 6 married couples with children. There was one single parent with a child or children.

In 2000 there were 11 single family homes (or 61.1% of the total) out of a total of 18 inhabited buildings. There were 1 multi-family buildings (5.6%), along with 5 multi-purpose buildings that were mostly used for housing (27.8%) and 1 other use buildings (commercial or industrial) that also had some housing (5.6%). Of the single family homes 6 were built before 1919. The most multi-family homes (1) were built between 1946 and 1960.

In 2000 there were 19 apartments in the municipality. The most common apartment size was 4 rooms of which there were 7. There were single room apartments and 8 apartments with five or more rooms. Of these apartments, a total of 18 apartments (94.7% of the total) were permanently occupied and 1 apartment (5.3%) was empty. As of 2009, the construction rate of new housing units was 0 new units per 1000 residents. The vacancy rate for the municipality, in 2010, was 0%.

The historical population is given in the following chart:

== Politics ==
In the 2007 federal election the most popular party was the FDP which received 34.21% of the vote. The next three most popular parties were the SVP (32.46%), the SP (12.72%) and the Green Party (7.02%). In the federal election, a total of 18 votes were cast, and the voter turnout was 48.6%.

== Economy ==
As of 2010, Rossenges had an unemployment rate of 2.2%. As of 2008, there were 9 people employed in the primary economic sector and about 4 businesses involved in this sector. people were employed in the secondary sector and there were businesses in this sector. 1 person was employed in the tertiary sector, with 1 business in this sector. There were 25 residents of the municipality who were employed in some capacity, of which females made up 44.0% of the workforce.

In 2008 the total number of full-time equivalent jobs was 7. The number of jobs in the primary sector was 6, all of which were in agriculture. There were no jobs in the secondary sector. The number of jobs in the tertiary sector was 1 which was in the movement and storage of goods.

In 2000, there were 11 workers who commuted away from the municipality. Of the working population, 4% used public transportation to get to work, and 40% used a private car.

== Religion ==
From the 2000 census, 4 or 7.8% were Roman Catholic, while 41 or 80.4% belonged to the Swiss Reformed Church. Of the rest of the population, and there were 3 individuals (or about 5.88% of the population) who belonged to another Christian church. 3 (or about 5.88% of the population) belonged to no church, are agnostic or atheist.

== Education ==
In Rossenges about 15 or (29.4%) of the population have completed non-mandatory upper secondary education, and 5 or (9.8%) have completed additional higher education (either university or a Fachhochschule). Of the 5 who completed tertiary schooling, 40.0% were Swiss men, 60.0% were Swiss women.

In the 2009/2010 school year there were a total of 12 students in the Rossenges school district. In the Vaud cantonal school system, two years of non-obligatory pre-school are provided by the political districts. During the school year, the political district provided pre-school care for a total of 155 children of which 83 children (53.5%) received subsidized pre-school care. The canton's primary school program requires students to attend for four years. There were 7 students in the municipal primary school program. The obligatory lower secondary school program lasts for six years and there were 4 students in those schools. There was also 1 student who was home schooled or attended another non-traditional school.

As of 2000, there were 6 students from Rossenges who attended schools outside the municipality.
