= Mill Road =

Mill Road may be:

== In Europe ==
- Mill Road, Cambridge, England
- Mill Road, Isle of Man

== In North America ==
- Mill Road, Eastchester, New York, USA
- Mill Road, Freeport, New York, USA
- Mill Road, Staten Island, New York, USA
- Old Mill Road, Staten Island, New York, USA
- Mill Road, Toronto, Ontario, Canada
- Mill Road, Edmonton, Alberta, Canada

== In New Zealand ==
- Mill Road, Invercargill in South Island

== See also ==
- Mill Lane (disambiguation)
- Mill Street (disambiguation)
