= Millbank Distillery =

Coordinates: 51°29′11″N 0°08′36″W

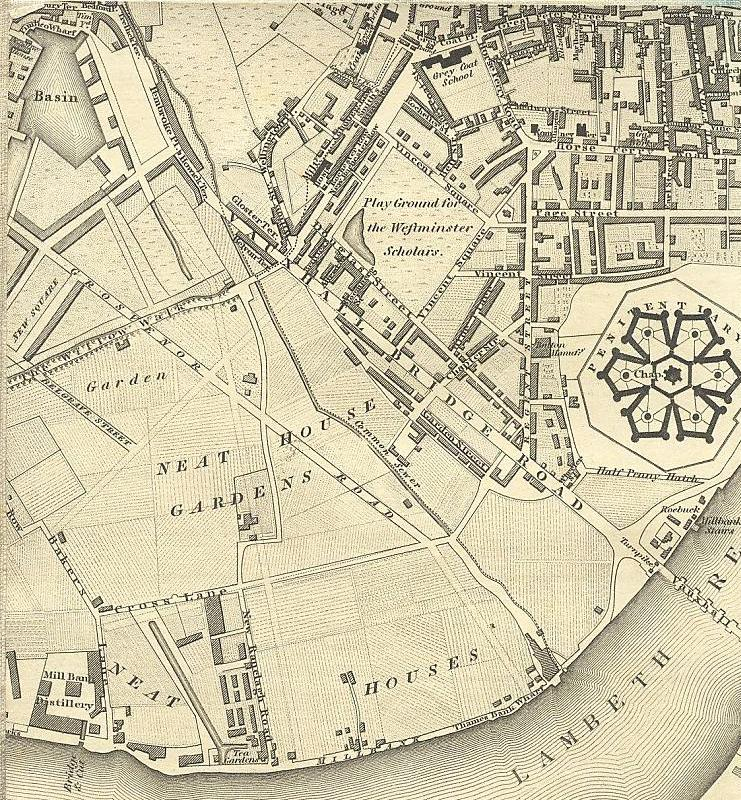
Greenwood's 1827 map showing the area now occupied by Pimlico; Millbank Distillery appears in the bottom left hand corner.

Millbank Distillery was a London gin distillery owned and operated by Seager Evans and Co. It was located on Grosvenor Road on the North bank of the River Thames in Pimlico. The company's best known product, Seagers Gin, was produced here up until the early 20th century. Millbank Distillery is often confused with Thames Bank Distillery a slightly older distillery, founded in 1797 and located further west along the river. Thames Bank Distillery was owned by Octavius Smith & Company - it was located on Grosvenor Road - its rear boundary was Lupus Street and on either side of it were Glasgow Terrace and Turpentine Lane.

== History ==
The distillery was established in the early 19th century, and operated for around a century. The site was leased from the Duke of Westminster, and the final lease expired in 1921.

By 1923 the company had moved to new premises at Deptford, and the former site of Millbank Distillery was occupied by a garage for the British Motor Cab Co. Today the site forms part of the Churchill Gardens housing estate.
