= Tshepisong =

Informal Settlement and Township in Johannesburg, Gauteng, South Africa

- Location within Gauteng Location within South Africa
- Coordinates: 26.19011°S 27.80339°E
- Country: South Africa
- Province: Gauteng
- Municipality: City of Johannesburg
- Established: 1998

Government
  - Councillor: MacDonald Galeshewe (ANC)

Area
  - Total: 6.56 km^{2} (2.53 sq mi)

Population (2011)
  - Total: 53,260
  - Density: 8,120/km^{2} (21,000/sq mi)
- Time zone: UTC+2 (SAST)
- Postal code (street): 1754

Tshepisong is both an informal settlement and township, located in Region D of the Johannesburg Metropolitan Municipality in Gauteng, South Africa and was established in 1998. To the south, the housing overlooks the old Durban Roodepoort Deep Mine and to the immediate west is the boundary with the Mogale City Local Municipality while to the east is Soweto.

Tshepisong is approximately 10 km west of Roodepoort and approximately 30 km from Johannesburg.

The settlement's 6.56 square km area has a total of 6,142 individual property stands. Residents in this densely populated, low cost and informal development are served by a public library a multipurpose centre, three well subscribed primary schools (Harry Gwala, Onkgopotse Tiro and Tshepisong), two high schools (Raymond Mhlaba and Wiseman Cele). There is no local police station and law and order is currently served by the Kagiso police station which falls under the Mogale City Local Municipality, about 5 km from the settlement.

According to a parliamentary question posed to the then minister of police (Bheki Cele) in 2019, plans have been put in place to construct a police station in Tshepisong in the 2028/2029 financial year.

== Infrastructure and public services delivery ==
Tshepisong has also been described as a "sprawling shack settlement" and this complex township has witnessed the damaging effects on the social fabric and service delivery tensions regularly affect the residents wellbeing. Crimes are reported to a local resident who runs Tshepisong West Green Door, a shelter for victims of Gender-Based and also serves as a "police station" for locals to report crime to.

The city leaders have issued tenders to upgrade gravel roads. handed over title deeds to residents in 2007 and in 2023, and committed themselves to dignified housing. In 2016 / 2017, the R3.9-billion of the cities budget was used for the electrification of informal settlements, which Sicelo Xulu (MD for City Power) claimed would assist with load-shedding prevention. City Power would later implement load reduction in those areas with high levels of electricity consumption and low payments. In 2023, 5,505 stands were reported as registered at the Deeds Office.

== Land claims ==
The Cremona Cheese Factory had been in Tshepisong since the 1970s. In 2016, the property owner proposed a mixed business development for middle income groups. Ownership of vacant land around this factory has been disputed and measures have been taken to prevent this property from being occupied.
