= Millgate Farm =

- Location within Gauteng Location within South Africa
- Coordinates: 25.989°S 27.946°E
- Country: South Africa
- Province: Gauteng
- Municipality: City of Johannesburg

Area
  - Total: 0.88 km^{2} (0.34 sq mi)

Population (2011)
  - Total: 172
  - Density: 200/km^{2} (510/sq mi)

Racial makeup (2011)
  - Black African: 53.8%
  - Coloured: 1.2%
  - White: 45.0%

First languages (2011)
  - English: 38.2%
  - Venda: 12.1%
  - Northern Sotho: 11.6%
  - Zulu: 11.0%
  - Other: 27.2%
- Time zone: UTC+2 (SAST)

Millgate Farm is a suburb of Johannesburg, South Africa. It is located in Region A of the City of Johannesburg Metropolitan Municipality.
