= Moudon =

- Municipality
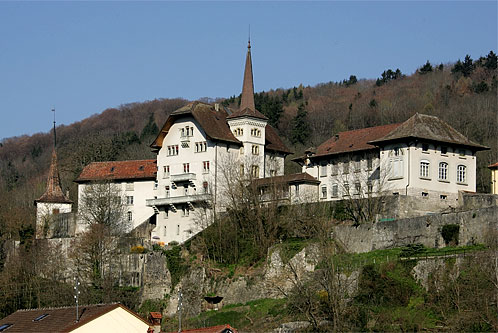
- Château de Carrouge

- Flag Coat of arms
- Location of Moudon
- Location within Switzerland Location within Canton of Vaud
- Coordinates: 46°40′N 6°48′E
- Country: Switzerland
- Canton: Vaud
- District: Broye-Vully

Government
  - Mayor: Syndic; Gilbert Gubler

Area
  - Total: 15.69 km^{2} (6.06 sq mi)
- Elevation: 514 m (1,686 ft)

Population (2004)
  - Total: 4,362
  - Density: 278.0/km^{2} (720.0/sq mi)
- Demonym(s): Les Moudonnois; Les Mange-plumes; Les Traîne-bailli
- Time zone: UTC+01:00 (CET)
  - Summer (DST): UTC+02:00 (CEST)
- Postal code: 1510
- SFOS number: 5678
- ISO 3166 code: CH-VD
- Localities: Bressonnaz
- Surrounded by: Neyruz-sur-Moudon, Bussy-sur-Moudon, Lucens, Curtilles, Chesalles-sur-Moudon, Chavannes-sur-Moudon, Vulliens, Syens, Rossenges, Hermenches, Sottens, Martherenges, Chapelle-sur-Moudon, Saint-Cierges
- Twin towns: Mazan (France)
- Website: www.moudon.ch

Moudon (French: [mudɔ̃]; Latin: Minnodunum; German: Milden) is a municipality in the canton of Vaud in Switzerland. It was the seat of Moudon District and is now in the Broye-Vully district.

== History ==
Montmagny was known as Minnodunum or Minnidunum during the Roman era. Around 1100, 1154 and 1180 it was mentioned as Meldun, in 1161 it was Moudon and in 1167 as Meldunum or Mildunum.

As ancient Minnodunum, during Roman times, the city was in the country of the Helvetii, on a road from Viviscus (modern Vevey), on the Lake of Geneva, to Aventicum (modern Avenches).

== Geography ==
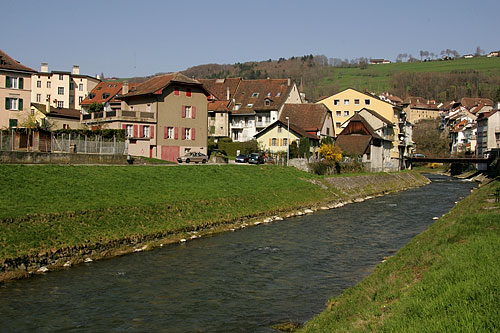
Broye river in Moudon

Aerial view (1946)

Moudon has an area, as of 2009, of 15.69 square kilometers (6.06 sq mi). Of this area, 7.33 km^{2} (2.83 sq mi) or 46.7% is used for agricultural purposes, while 5.5 km^{2} (2.1 sq mi) or 35.1% is forested. Of the rest of the land, 2.59 km^{2} (1.00 sq mi) or 16.5% is settled (buildings or roads), 0.28 km^{2} (0.11 sq mi) or 1.8% is either rivers or lakes and 0.01 km^{2} (2.5 acres) or 0.1% is unproductive land.

Of the built up area, industrial buildings made up 2.9% of the total area while housing and buildings made up 6.6% and transportation infrastructure made up 5.5%. Out of the forested land, 32.8% of the total land area is heavily forested and 2.2% is covered with orchards or small clusters of trees. Of the agricultural land, 27.9% is used for growing crops and 17.8% is pastures. Of the water in the municipality, 0.2% is in lakes and 1.6% is in rivers and streams.

The municipality was the capital of the Moudon District until it was dissolved on 31 August 2006, and Moudon became part of the new district of Broye-Vully.

The upper city is located at the confluence of the Mérine and Broye rivers. The lower city stretches downstream along the Broye river. It lies on the intersection of two historically important roads, one from Italy to Burgundy and the other between Geneva and Bern. It consists of the village of Moudon and the hamlets of Plan and Villaret, the northern section of the hamlet of Bressonnaz-Dessous and numerous (mostly medieval) farm house settlements including Alliérens, Beauregard, Belflori, Chalabruz, Cornier, Frémont, La Baume, La Cerjaulaz, La Faye, Le Grand-Pré, Grange-Verney, Gréchon, Montsandon, Valacrêt.

The municipalities of Moudon and Rossenges are considering a merger at a date in the future into the new municipality of Moudon.

== Coat of arms ==
The blazon of the municipal coat of arms is Per pale Gules and Vert, overall a capital M Or.

== Demographics ==
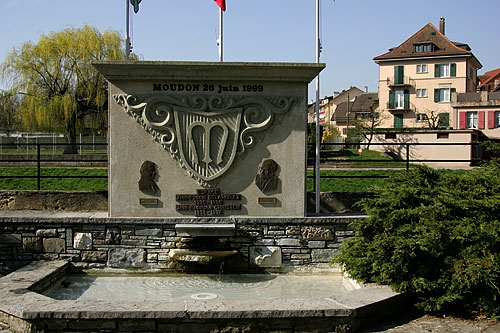
Green space in Moudon

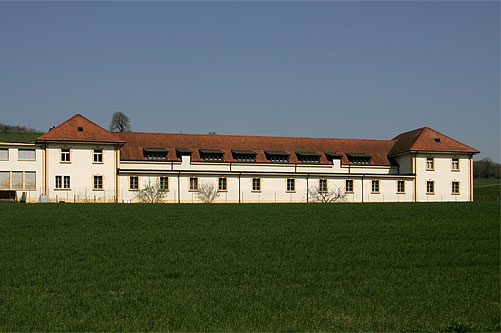
18th Century Arsenal

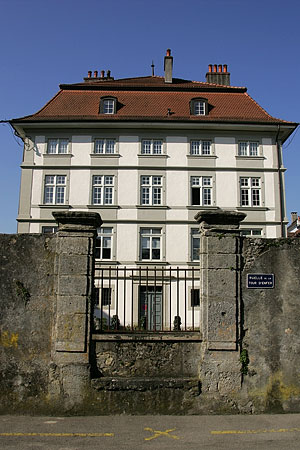
Manor house in Moudon

Moudon has a population (as of December 2020) of 6,101. As of 2008, 37.5% of the population are resident foreign nationals. Over the last 10 years (1999–2009) the population has changed at a rate of 10.8%. It has changed at a rate of 7.2% due to migration and at a rate of 4.7% due to births and deaths.

Most of the population (as of 2000) speaks French (3,474 or 79.5%), with Portuguese being second most common (197 or 4.5%) and Albanian being third (172 or 3.9%). There are 130 people who speak German, 95 people who speak Italian and 2 people who speak Romansh.

Of the population in the municipality 1,203 or about 27.5% were born in Moudon and lived there in 2000. There were 1,036 or 23.7% who were born in the same canton, while 592 or 13.5% were born somewhere else in Switzerland, and 1,308 or 29.9% were born outside of Switzerland.

In 2008 there were 30 live births to Swiss citizens and 27 births to non-Swiss citizens, and in same time span there were 30 deaths of Swiss citizens and 2 non-Swiss citizen deaths. Ignoring immigration and emigration, the population of Swiss citizens remained the same while the foreign population increased by 25. There were 41 Swiss men and 31 Swiss women who immigrated back to Switzerland. At the same time, there were 65 non-Swiss men and 57 non-Swiss women who immigrated from another country to Switzerland. The total Swiss population change in 2008 (from all sources, including moves across municipal borders) was an increase of 130 and the non-Swiss population increased by 129 people. This represents a population growth rate of 5.9%.

The age distribution, as of 2009, in Moudon is; 538 children or 11.3% of the population are between 0 and 9 years old and 692 teenagers or 14.5% are between 10 and 19. Of the adult population, 649 people or 13.6% of the population are between 20 and 29 years old. 628 people or 13.2% are between 30 and 39, 771 people or 16.2% are between 40 and 49, and 588 people or 12.3% are between 50 and 59. The senior population distribution is 427 people or 8.9% of the population are between 60 and 69 years old, 269 people or 5.6% are between 70 and 79, there are 179 people or 3.8% who are between 80 and 89, and there are 31 people or 0.6% who are 90 and older.

As of 2000, there were 1,791 people who were single and never married in the municipality. There were 2,128 married individuals, 265 widows or widowers and 187 individuals who are divorced.

As of 2000, there were 1,720 private households in the municipality, and an average of 2.4 persons per household. There were 570 households that consist of only one person and 145 households with five or more people. Out of a total of 1,764 households that answered this question, 32.3% were households made up of just one person and there were 9 adults who lived with their parents. Of the rest of the households, there are 429 married couples without children, 609 married couples with children. There were 89 single parents with a child or children. There were 14 households that were made up of unrelated people and 44 households that were made up of some sort of institution or another collective housing.

In 2000 there were 296 single family homes (or 40.9% of the total) out of a total of 724 inhabited buildings. There were 189 multi-family buildings (26.1%), along with 124 multi-purpose buildings that were mostly used for housing (17.1%) and 115 other use buildings (commercial or industrial) that also had some housing (15.9%). Of the single family homes 67 were built before 1919, while 16 were built between 1990 and 2000. The most multi-family homes (66) were built before 1919 and the next most (36) were built between 1946 and 1960. There were 3 multi-family houses built between 1996 and 2000.

In 2000 there were 2,000 apartments in the municipality. The most common apartment size was 3 rooms of which there were 712. There were 141 single room apartments and 348 apartments with five or more rooms. Of these apartments, a total of 1,676 apartments (83.8% of the total) were permanently occupied, while 204 apartments (10.2%) were seasonally occupied and 120 apartments (6.0%) were empty. As of 2009, the construction rate of new housing units was 5.9 new units per 1000 residents. The vacancy rate for the municipality, in 2010, was 0.62%.

The historical population is given in the following chart:

== Heritage sites of national significance ==
The Ancien Grenier, the Swiss Reformed Church of Saint-Étienne, the Fountain de Moïse (Moses Fountain), the City Hall, the D’Arnay House, the États de Vaud House, the Loys de Villardin House, the De Rochefort House, the Tacheron House and the Castle Tower are listed as Swiss heritage site of national significance.

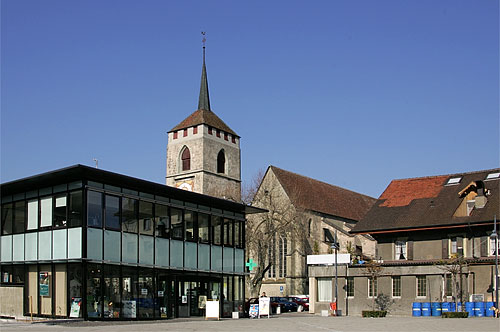
Swiss Reformed Church of Saint-Étienne

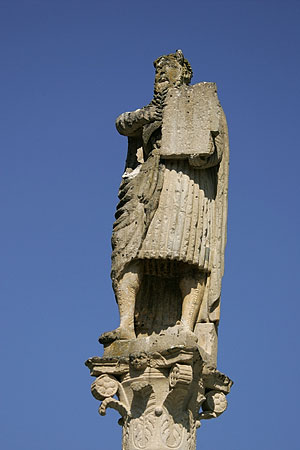
Fountain de Moïse

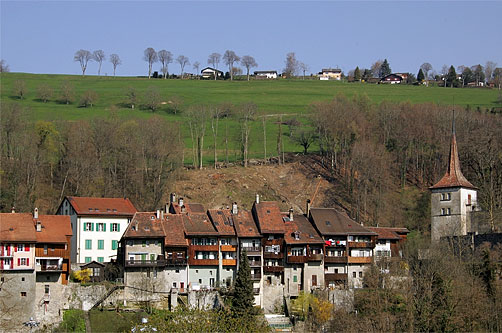
Castle tower and upper city

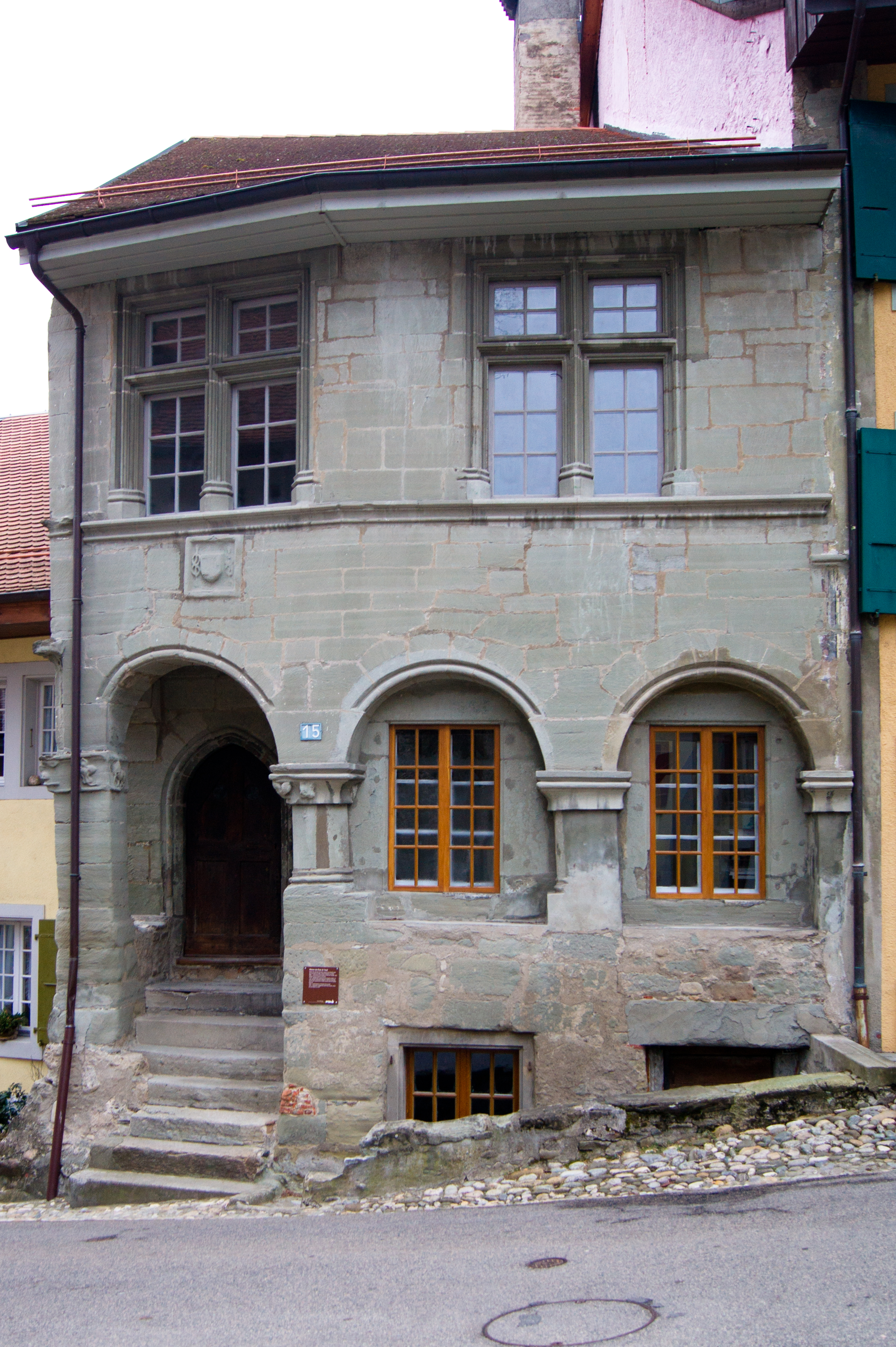
Maison des États de Vaud

== Twin Town ==
Moudon is twinned with:

- Mazan, France

== Politics ==
In the 2007 federal election the most popular party was the FDP which received 33.2% of the vote. The next three most popular parties were the SVP (22.62%), the SP (17.31%) and the Green Party (10.9%). In the federal election, a total of 904 votes were cast, and the voter turnout was 41.4%.

== Economy ==
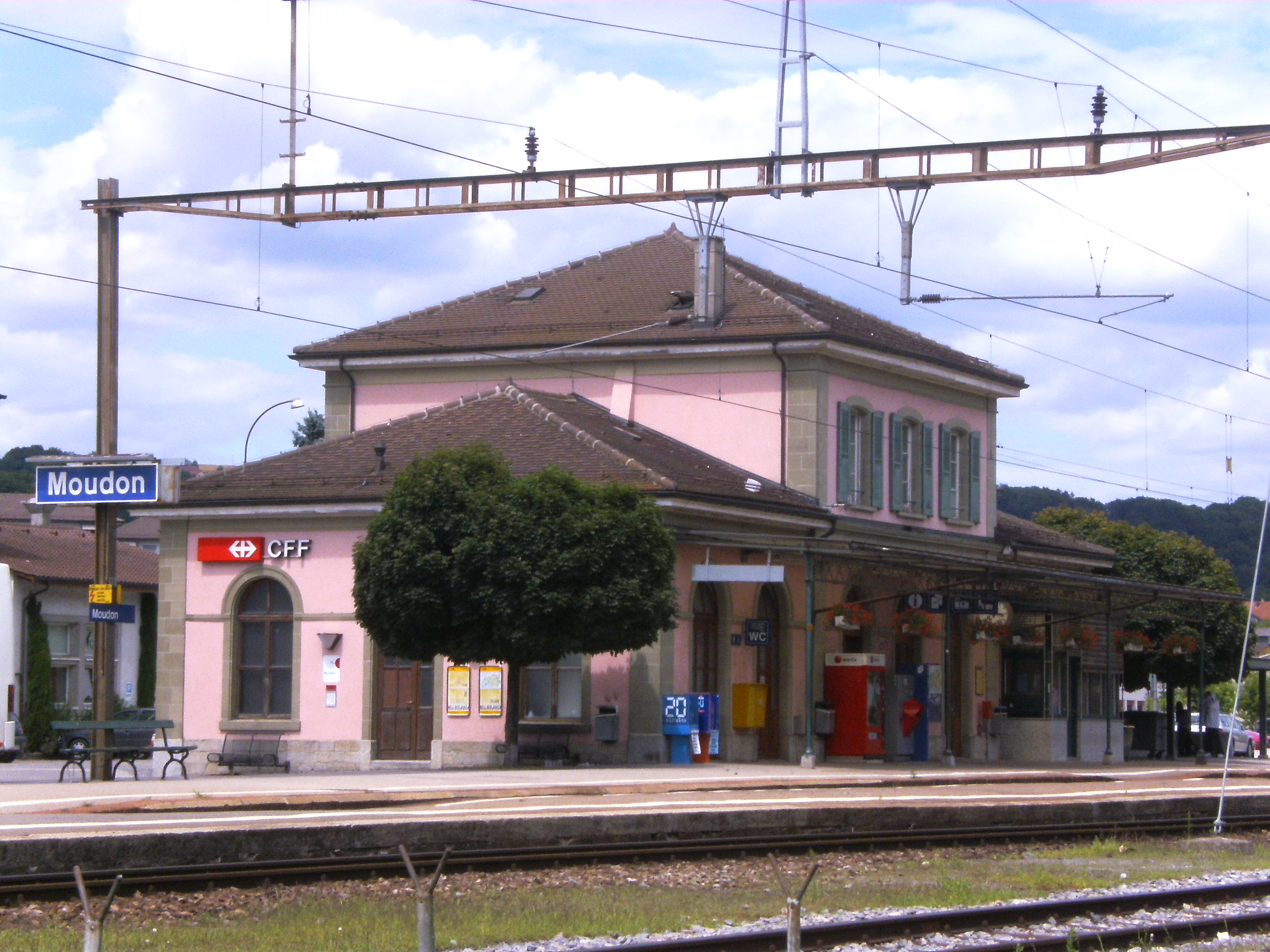
Moudon train station

As of 2010, Moudon had an unemployment rate of 6.6%. As of 2008, there were 64 people employed in the primary economic sector and about 21 businesses involved in this sector. 740 people were employed in the secondary sector and there were 65 businesses in this sector. 1,619 people were employed in the tertiary sector, with 210 businesses in this sector. There were 2,054 residents of the municipality who were employed in some capacity, of which females made up 41.4% of the workforce.

In 2008 the total number of full-time equivalent jobs was 2,021. The number of jobs in the primary sector was 50, of which 45 were in agriculture and 5 were in forestry or lumber production. The number of jobs in the secondary sector was 701 of which 405 or (57.8%) were in manufacturing and 251 (35.8%) were in construction. The number of jobs in the tertiary sector was 1,270. In the tertiary sector; 358 or 28.2% were in wholesale or retail sales or the repair of motor vehicles, 174 or 13.7% were in the movement and storage of goods, 88 or 6.9% were in a hotel or restaurant, 8 or 0.6% were in the information industry, 33 or 2.6% were the insurance or financial industry, 72 or 5.7% were technical professionals or scientists, 158 or 12.4% were in education and 178 or 14.0% were in health care.

In 2000, there were 1,366 workers who commuted into the municipality and 875 workers who commuted away. The municipality is a net importer of workers, with about 1.6 workers entering the municipality for every one leaving. Of the working population, 11.2% used public transportation to get to work, and 55.5% used a private car.

== Religion ==
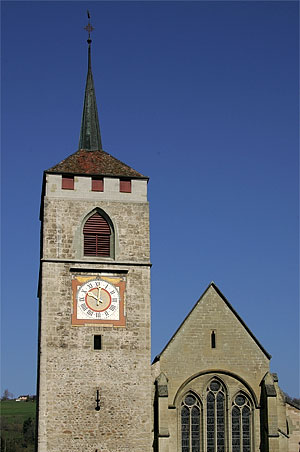
Swiss Reformed Church of Saint-Etienne

From the 2000 census, 1,477 or 33.8% were Roman Catholic, while 1,471 or 33.7% belonged to the Swiss Reformed Church. Of the rest of the population, there were 21 members of an Orthodox church (or about 0.48% of the population), there were 7 individuals (or about 0.16% of the population) who belonged to the Christian Catholic Church, and there were 82 individuals (or about 1.88% of the population) who belonged to another Christian church. There were 3 individuals (or about 0.07% of the population) who were Jewish, and 506 (or about 11.58% of the population) who were Islamic. There were 5 individuals who were Buddhist, 8 individuals who were Hindu and 24 individuals who belonged to another church. 428 (or about 9.79% of the population) belonged to no church, are agnostic or atheist, and 339 individuals (or about 7.76% of the population) did not answer the question.

== Education ==
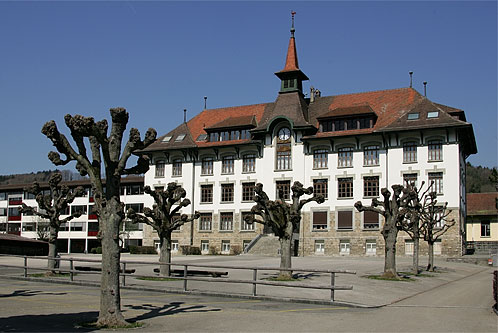
Primary school in Moudon

In Moudon about 1,318 or (30.2%) of the population have completed non-mandatory upper secondary education, and 341 or (7.8%) have completed additional higher education (either university or a Fachhochschule). Of the 341 who completed tertiary schooling, 55.7% were Swiss men, 23.5% were Swiss women, 14.4% were non-Swiss men and 6.5% were non-Swiss women.

In the 2009/2010 school year there were a total of 665 students in the Moudon school district. In the Vaud cantonal school system, two years of non-obligatory pre-school are provided by the political districts. During the school year, the political district provided pre-school care for a total of 155 children of which 83 children (53.5%) received subsidized pre-school care. The canton's primary school program requires students to attend for four years. There were 347 students in the municipal primary school program. The obligatory lower secondary school program lasts for six years and there were 269 students in those schools. There were also 49 students who were home schooled or attended another non-traditional school.

As of 2000, there were 514 students in Moudon who came from another municipality, while 136 residents attended schools outside the municipality.

== Transportation ==
The municipality has a railway station, Moudon, on the Palézieux–Lyss railway line. It has regular service to Lausanne, Palézieux, Payerne, and Kerzers.

== Notable people ==
- Abraham-Louis-Rodolphe Ducros (1748–1810), painter, watercolourist and engraver and a main figure in the 'pre-romantic' movement.
- Daniel Peter (1836–1919), chocolatier and inventor of milk chocolate
- Eugène Burnand (1850 – 1921), painter
- Gabriel Tschumi (1883–1957), Master Chef to Queen Victoria, King Edward VII and King George V.
- Gustave Roud (1897–1976), poet and photographer, died in Moudon
- Philippe Jaccottet (1925–2021), Francophone poet and translator
- Daniel Atienza (1974–), former Spanish professional road bicycle racer
