= Millhead F.C. =

Association football club

Millhead
- Full name: Millhead Football Club
- Ground: Iodine Park
- Coordinates: 54.1357°N 2.7688°W
- League: Westmorland League; Division 3
colours

Millhead Football Club are a football club based in the village of Millhead, near Carnforth, England.

Millhead have existed since at least the 1920s. As of 2024–25, they play in Division 3 of the Westmorland League.

== Iodine Park ==
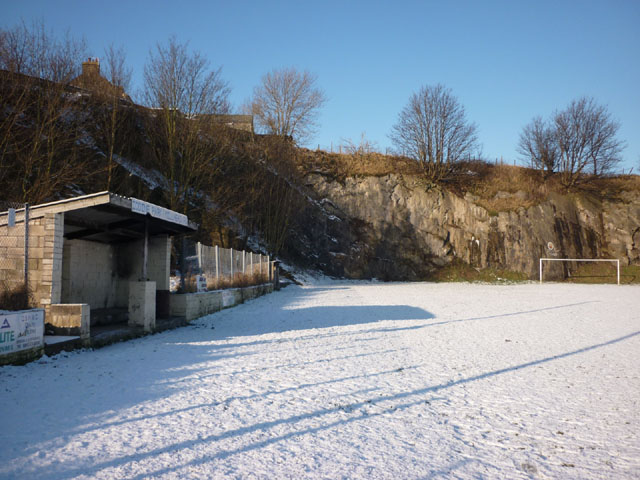
Iodine Park in January 2010

Millhead play their home games at Iodine Park. A former gravel pit, the name was acquired in the 1950s due to the wounds received by players from stones in the topsoil: iodine being traditionally used to treat such injuries. GAA club Clanna Gael used to play at a ground with the same nickname, so-called again for its propensity to cause injury.

Junior teams from nearby Warton also play at Iodine Park.

In the 2020 book British Football's Greatest Grounds by Mike Bayly, Iodine Park was voted one of the top grounds to visit in the country. Bayly writes:

Shoehorned into a disused quarry at the end of a narrow grit road, with a pitch that barely exceeds minimum width requirements, Iodine Park has carved a reputation as one of the most unique football venues in Britain.

Iodine Park has been described as "A National Treasure". Its unusual features led to it be featured on the Spanish football show El día después in 2019. It also featured in a Sky TV documentary called Mission to Burnley.
