= Jane Hungerford Milbank =

American poet

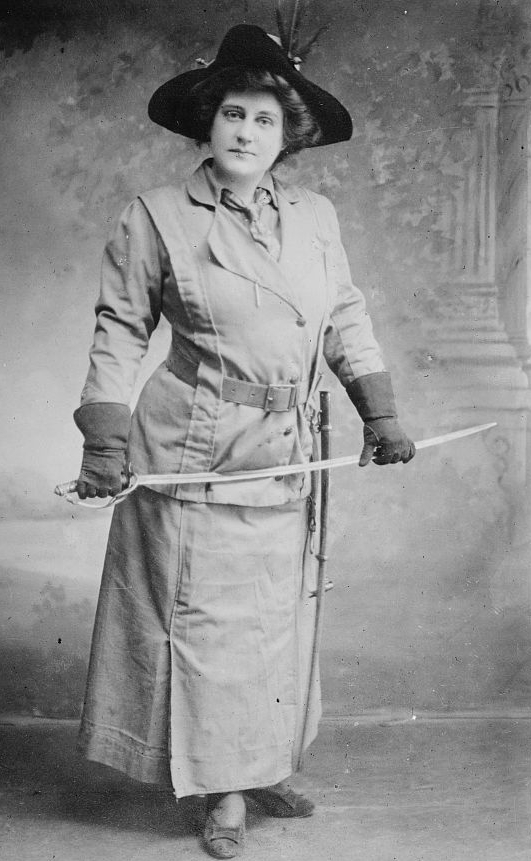
- Born: Jane Hungerford Henry; April 10, 1871; Sparta, Georgia
- Died: March 4, 1931 (aged 59); Freeport, Long Island
- Occupations: Suffragist, Writer

Jane Hungerford Milbank (April 10, 1871 - March 4, 1931) was an American suffragette who organized the Army of Columbians.

== Early life ==
She was born on April 10, 1871, in Sparta, Georgia, as Jane Hungerford Henry. She claimed to have posed for artist John La Farge as a young woman, and to have been the model for his "Adoration" and "St. John."

== Activism ==
Mrs. Milbank was best known for proposing an "Army of Columbians," a military regiment of women, during World War I, complete with a uniform she designed and wore. She held weekly training sessions for a handful of recruits, with wooden guns. "My only fear is that they will be too savage warriors," she assured doubters. She also suggested that military training might decrease domestic discord. Her program was formalized by 1915 as the International Order of Military Women, with Milbank presiding.

She was also an author and poet, using the name "J. Hungerford Milbank" to publish a collection of miscellaneous short works titled Florence Gardiner Sings. She was a member of the Century Theatre Club for more than twenty years.

== Personal life ==
She first married Cedric (or Carl) Augustus Erlund in 1893, and had two sons during their marriage, named Cambridge Erlund (b. 1896) and Charles Hungerford Erlund (Milbank) (b. 1901). She married a second time, to Charles Budd Milbank, in 1904. She was widowed when Mr. Milbank died in 1920, and she died on March 4, 1931, in Freeport, Long Island.
