= Mill Lane, Hampshire =

Hamlet in Hampshire, England

Coordinates: 51.233262°N 0.862727°W

Mill Lane
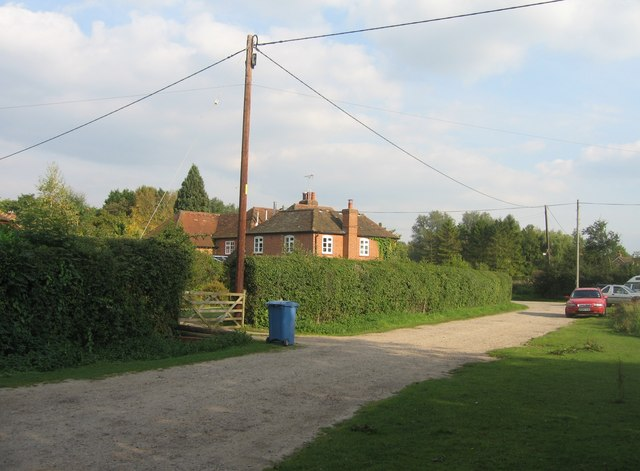
- Mill Lane

- Location within Hampshire
- OS grid reference: SU7949948845
- District: Hart
- Shire county: Hampshire
- Region: South East
- Country: England
- Sovereign state: United Kingdom
- Post town: ODIHAM
- Police: Hampshire and Isle of Wight
- Fire: Hampshire and Isle of Wight
- Ambulance: South Central
- UK Parliament: North East Hampshire

Mill Lane is a hamlet in Hampshire, England. Its nearest town is Fleet approximately 2.5 miles (4.0 km) away. The hamlet lies on the A287 road between Odiham and Aldershot. The hamlet is only made up of a few houses and a petrol station.

Bowenhurst Golf Centre is located nearby with a 9-hole pay and play course and a floodlit Driving Range.
