= Mill Green, Buxhall =

Hamlet near Buxhall, Suffolk, United Kingdom

Coordinates: 52.182°N 0.9185°E

Mill Green
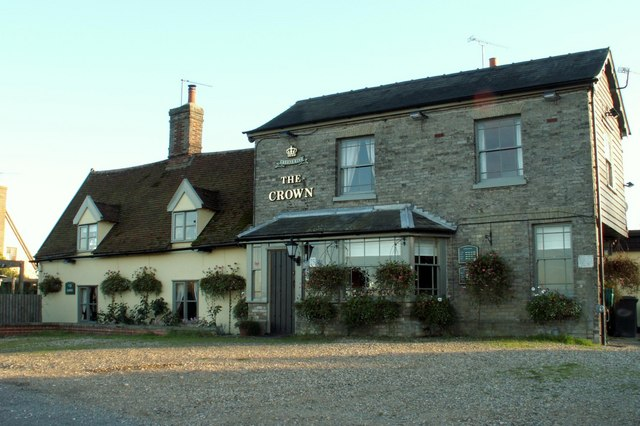
- The Crown

- Location within Suffolk
- Civil parish: Buxhall
- District: Mid Suffolk
- Shire county: Suffolk
- Region: East
- Country: England
- Sovereign state: United Kingdom
- Police: Suffolk
- Fire: Suffolk
- Ambulance: East of England

Mill Green is a hamlet in the civil parish of Buxhall, in the Mid Suffolk district, in the county of Suffolk, England.

== See also ==
- Buxhall Windmill
