= Millden =

Coordinates: 56.899155°N 2.756796°W

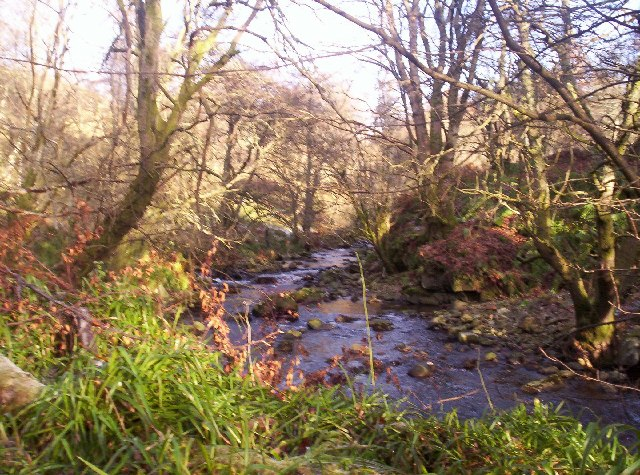
- The Burn of Turret, by Milden

- Location within Angus
- OS grid reference: NO540789
- Council area: Angus
- Lieutenancy area: Angus
- Country: Scotland
- Sovereign state: United Kingdom
- Post town: BRECHIN
- Postcode district: DD9
- Dialling code: 01356
- Police: Scotland
- Fire: Scottish
- Ambulance: Scottish
- UK Parliament: Angus
- Scottish Parliament: Angus; North East Scotland

Millden is a hamlet, estate and farmstead in Glenesk, Angus, Scotland. It is situated in the upper course of the Glen Esk valley, where the Burn of Turret meets the River North Esk, around 7 1/2 miles (12.1 km) north of Edzell Thomas Mainprize is one of the Gamekeepers in the estate which is well known for its grouse and pheasant shooting

== See also ==
- Tarfside
- Edzell
