= West Coast National Park =

Nature reserve north of Cape Town in the Western Cape province of South Africa

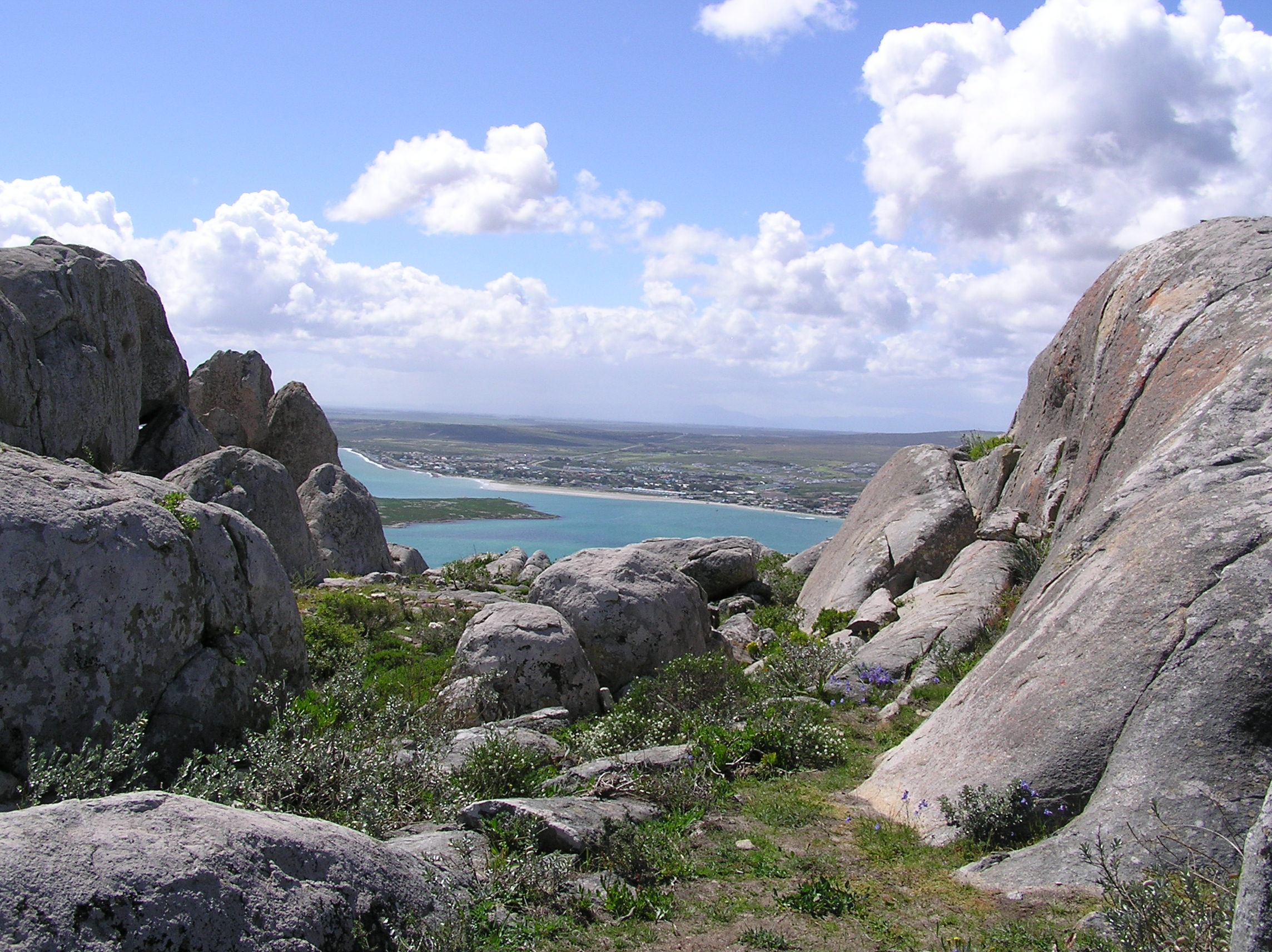
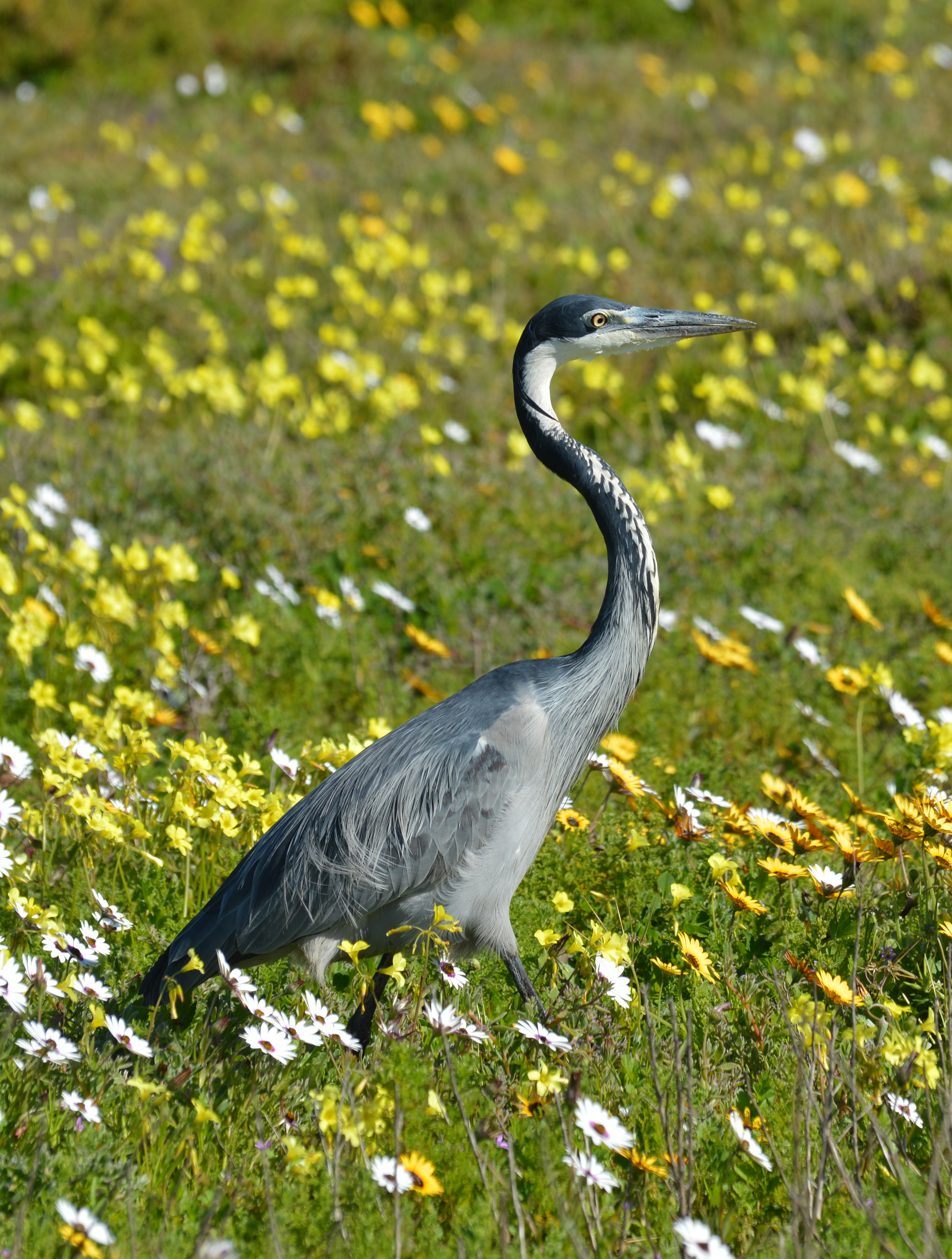
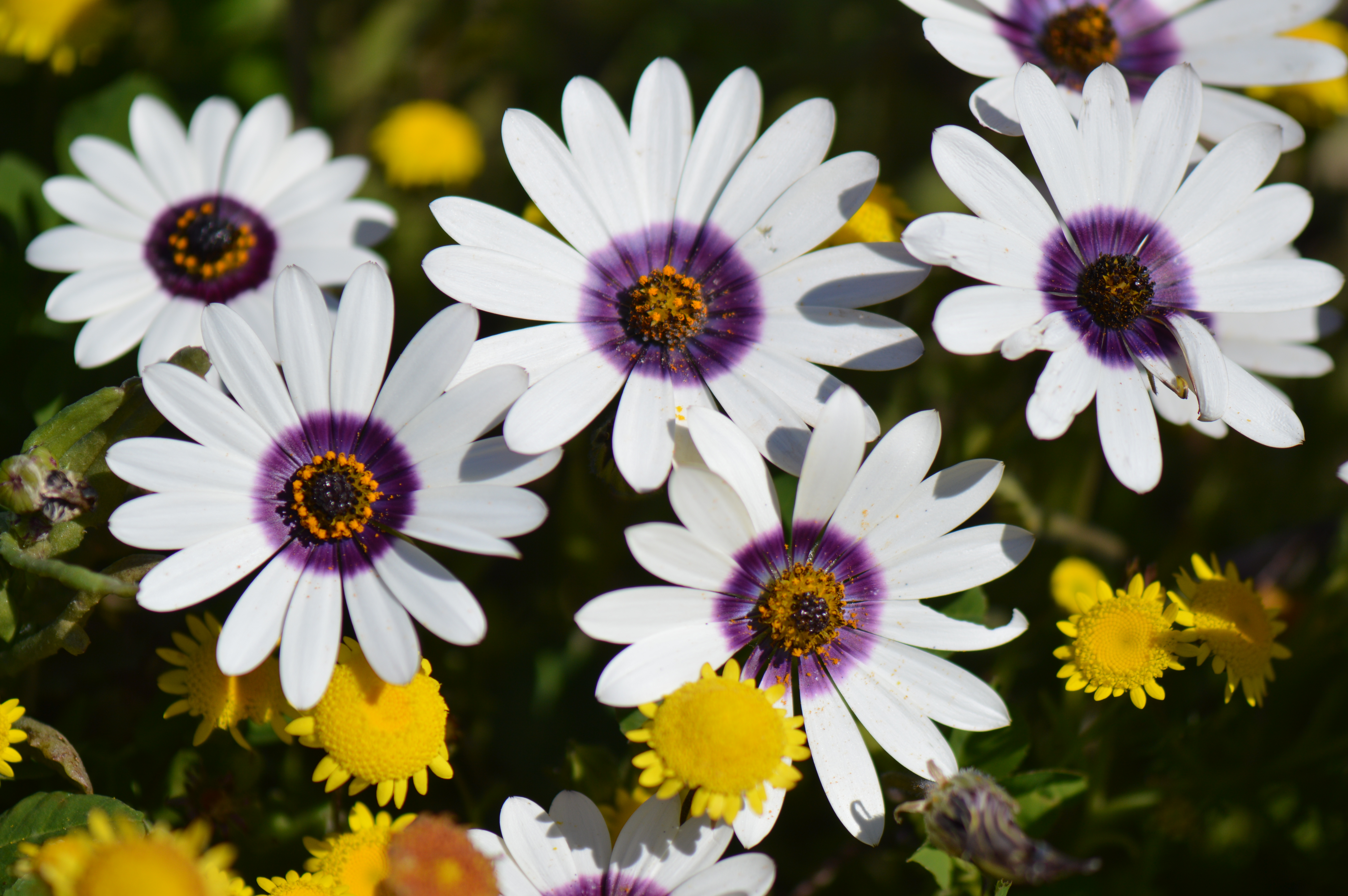
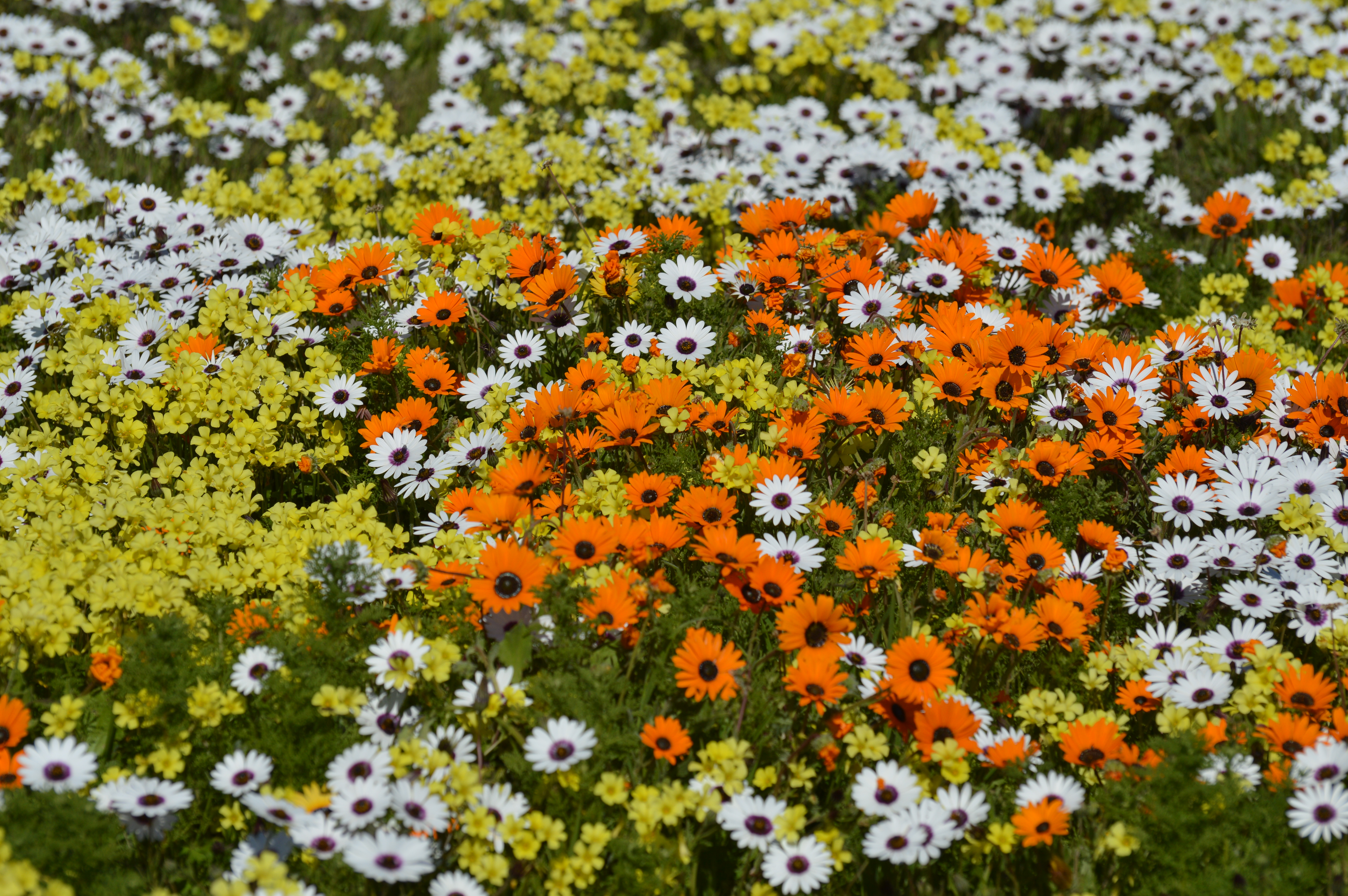
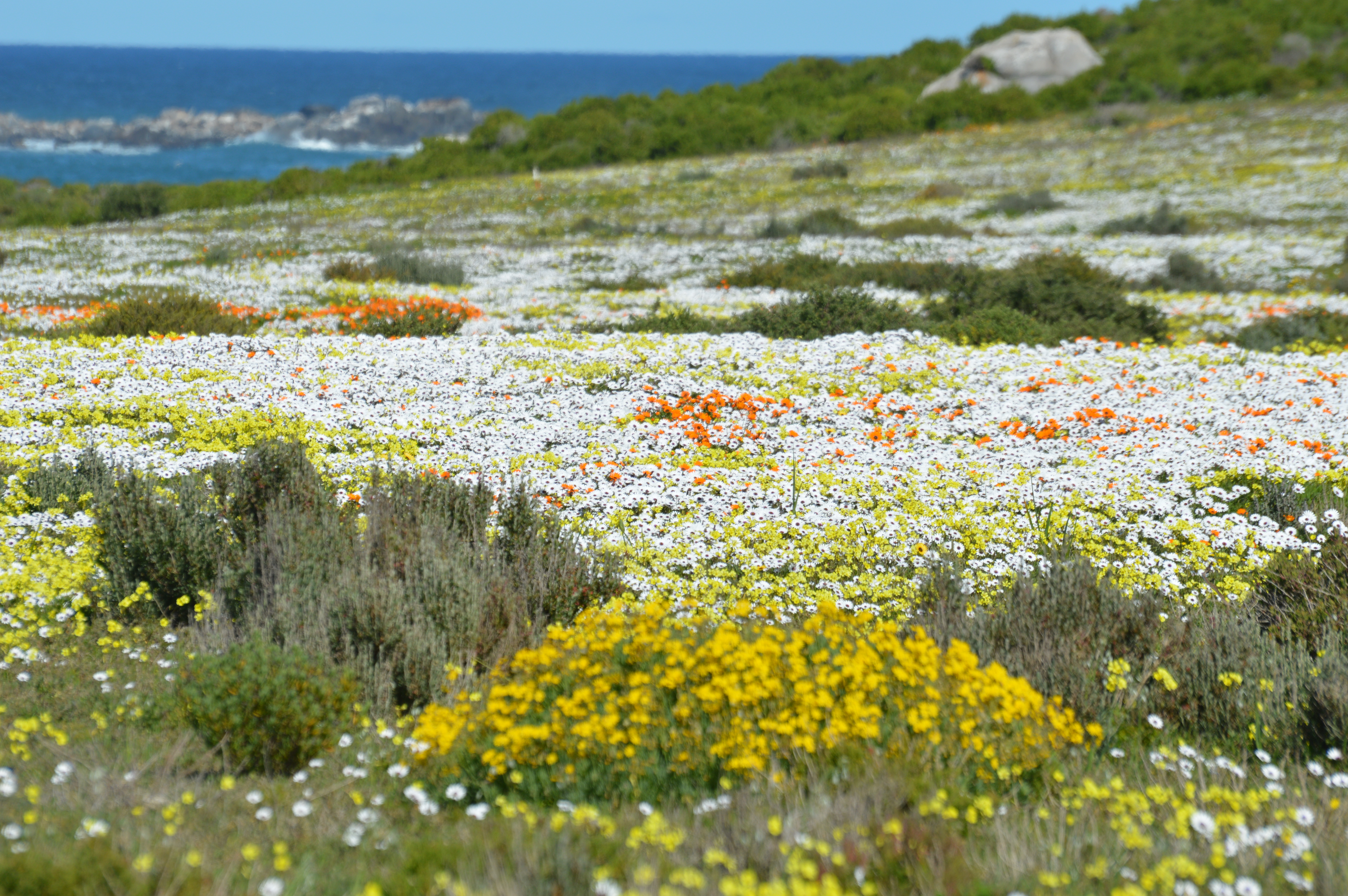
- Granite formations overlooking the Langebaan Lagoon (top). A black-headed heron (middle left). White rain daisies blooming during the spring flower season (middle right). Closeup of a blooming flower field during the spring flower season (bottom left). View over a field during the spring flower season with the Atlantic Ocean in the background (bottom right).
- Interactive map of West Coast National Park
- Location: Western Cape, South Africa
- Nearest city: Langebaan
- Coordinates: 33°7′15″S 18°4′0″E
- Area: 362.59 square kilometres (140.00 sq mi)
- Established: 1985
- Administrator: South African National Parks
- Website: West Coast National Park - SANParks

The West Coast National Park lies 88 km (55 mi) north of Cape Town in the Western Cape province of South Africa. (Note: Measured from Cape Town City Hall) The park is found inside of the Cape West Coast Biosphere Reserve, part of the UNESCO Man and the Biosphere Programme. It is bordered by the Atlantic Ocean on the west and the R27 coastal road, and runs from the town of Yzerfontein in the south, up to the Langebaan Lagoon. The park is particularly well known for its bird life and for the spring flowers which occur in the months from August to September, especially in the Postberg flower reserve section of the park. The park, with the islands in Saldanha Bay, has been identified by BirdLife International as an Important Bird Area. The park was proclaimed in 1985, and is 36,259.8 hectares (140.000 mi^{2}) in size.

== History of protection ==
The Langebaan Lagoon, a Ramsar site, was proclaimed as a marine reserve in 1973. Concerns over the condition of the Langebaan Lagoon and neighbouring Saldanha Bay led to a proposal in 1976 that the Langebaan Lagoon, the peninsula, the offshore islands and the surrounding land urgently be proclaimed as a nature reserve. The Langebaan National Park was declared in 1985, after a long process, and it was expanded in 1987 when some land which had been managed by the Department of Forestry and neighbouring farms were included in the park. In that same year an additional 1,800 hectares (4,400 acres) of land around Postberg was included as a "contractual national park". Expansion has continued since then. Its name was changed to West Coast National Park in 1987. In 2000, the park and Langebaan Lagoon was added to the UNESCO Cape West Coast Biosphere Reserve.

== Fauna ==
Wildlife in the park includes large antelope such as eland, red hartebeest, bontebok, kudu, gemsbok, steenbok, mountain zebra, duiker and ostriches in the Postberg section. Other smaller animals include the bat-eared fox, caracal, and Cape grey mongoose.

Many Palearctic migrants winter in the lagoon during the austral summer, particularly in September as species arrive from the northern hemisphere, and in March when they gather in large numbers to feed up prior to undertaking the return migration. At these times the birds will be transitioning out of and into their breeding plumage. The birds are pushed towards the hides as the water level rises with the tide and eventually they must fly off until the tide has receded once more. Red knot, sanderling, little stint, ruff, marsh sandpiper, terek sandpiper and curlew sandpipers, ruddy turnstone, ringed and grey plover, greenshank, Eurasian whimbrel, Eurasian curlew and bar-tailed godwit are the most regular species. Little egret and South African shelduck are residents and can often be seen with the waders, while greater flamingoes and Great white pelican occur in deeper water. An isolated hide west of the Geelbek educational centre overlooks a salt pan where it is possible to observe the rare chestnut-banded plover. The lagoon's importance for migratory birds means that it is a site which is subject to the Ramsar Convention for the conservation and sustainable use of wetlands.

On the land, the fynbos surrounding the lagoon is home to Southern black korhaan, Cape spurfowl, Grey-winged francolin, Cape penduline and grey tit, ant-eating chat, white-throated and yellow canary, Karoo lark, Chestnut-vented warbler, Bokmakierie and Cape bunting, which are all easily seen. African marsh harrier and Black Harrier hunt by quartering the ground. The coastal islands at the mouth of the lagoon are important breeding colonies for kelp and Hartlaub's gull, Cape gannet and African penguin, as well as cormorants and terns.

== Flora ==
Although the thousands of migrating birds are an important part of the conservation, the flowers are also a major attraction. The park is composed of various kinds of habitats — as well as the Langebaan fynbos and lagoon — which account for the variety of flora and fauna all around the park. The months of August and September bring about the proliferation of annual Spring flowers in the West Coast National Park. During the spring flower season large fields of blooming White rain daisies (Dimorphotheca pluvialis), Gousblom (Arctotis hirsuta), Magriet (Ursinia anthemoides), Livingstone daisies (Dorotheanthus bellidiformis), and Wild sorrel (Oxalis pes-caprae) can be seen along with other species of flowering plants.

== Postberg ==
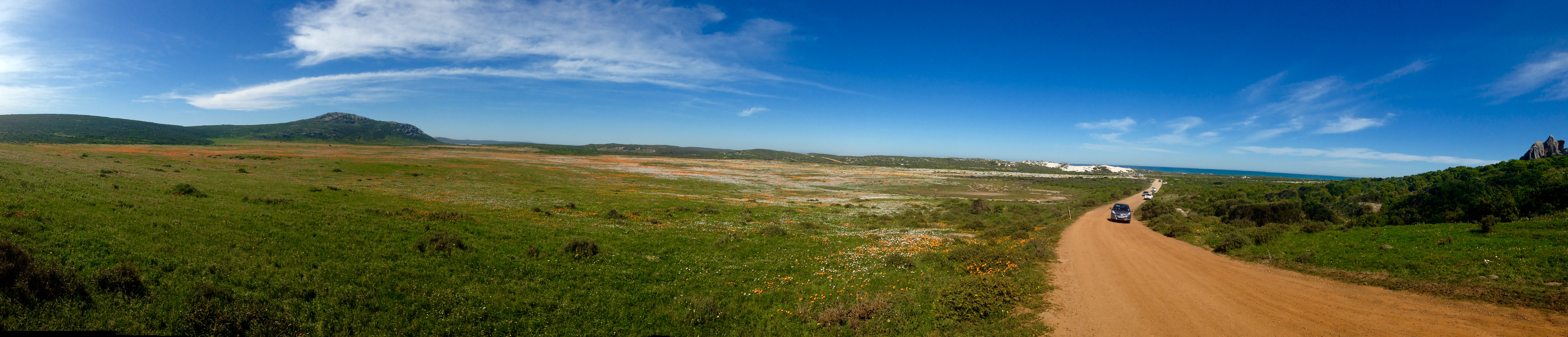
Spring flowers in the Postberg area during August to September. A view from one of the roads up to the 'uitkyk'.

The area of Postberg, where the carpets of Spring flowers can be seen, is only open during the months of August and September. The most common flower species are Suurvy (Carpobrotus edulis), Elandsvy (Carpobrotus acinaciformis), Gousblom (Arctotis hirsuta), Bokbaai vygie (Dorotheanthus bellidiformis), White rain daisy (Dimorphotheca pluvialis), Sporrie (Heliophila coronopifolia), Magriet (Ursinia anthemoides), and Soetuintjie (Moraea fugax).

== Photo gallery ==
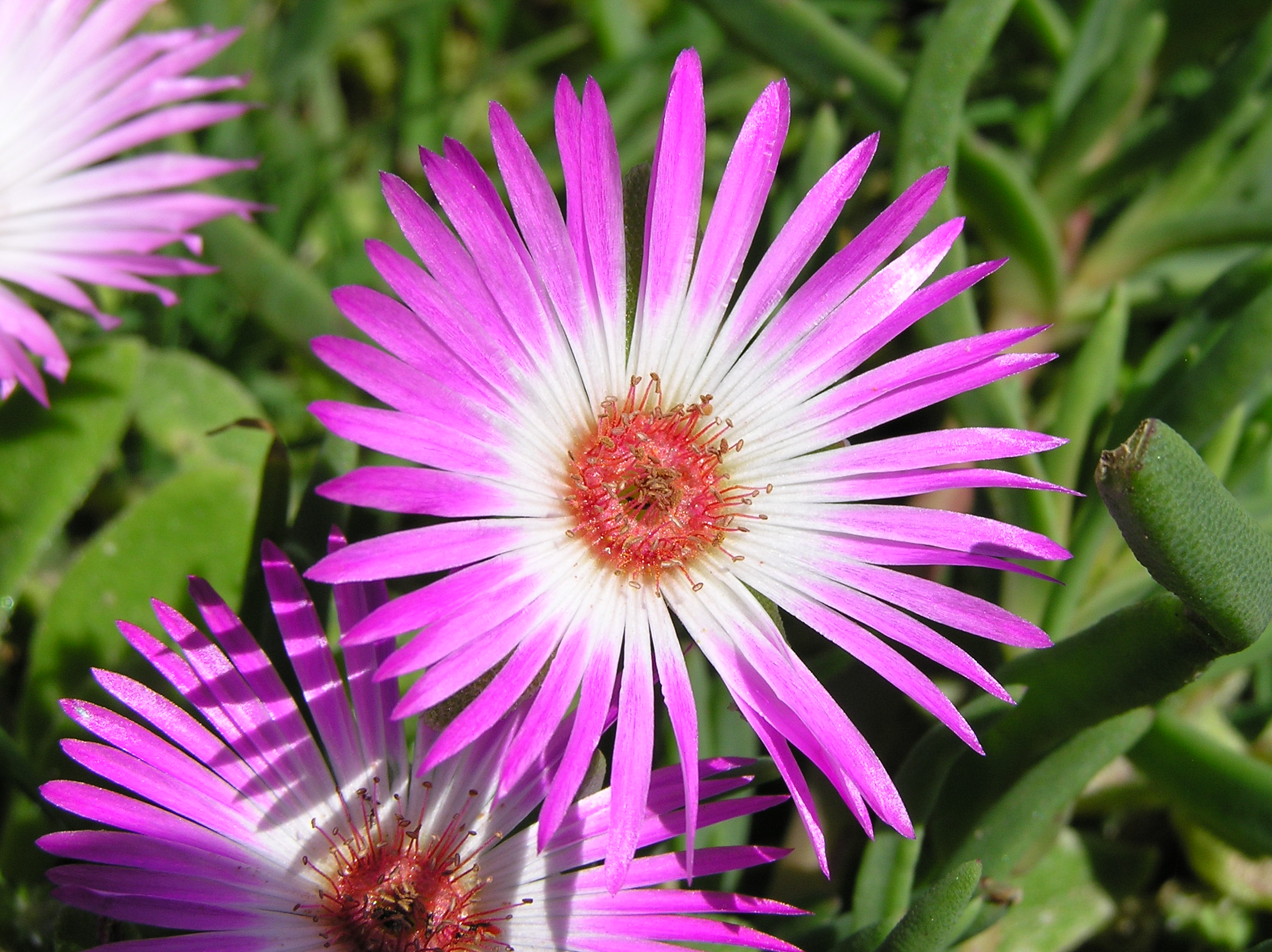
Livingstone daisy, C. bellidiforme

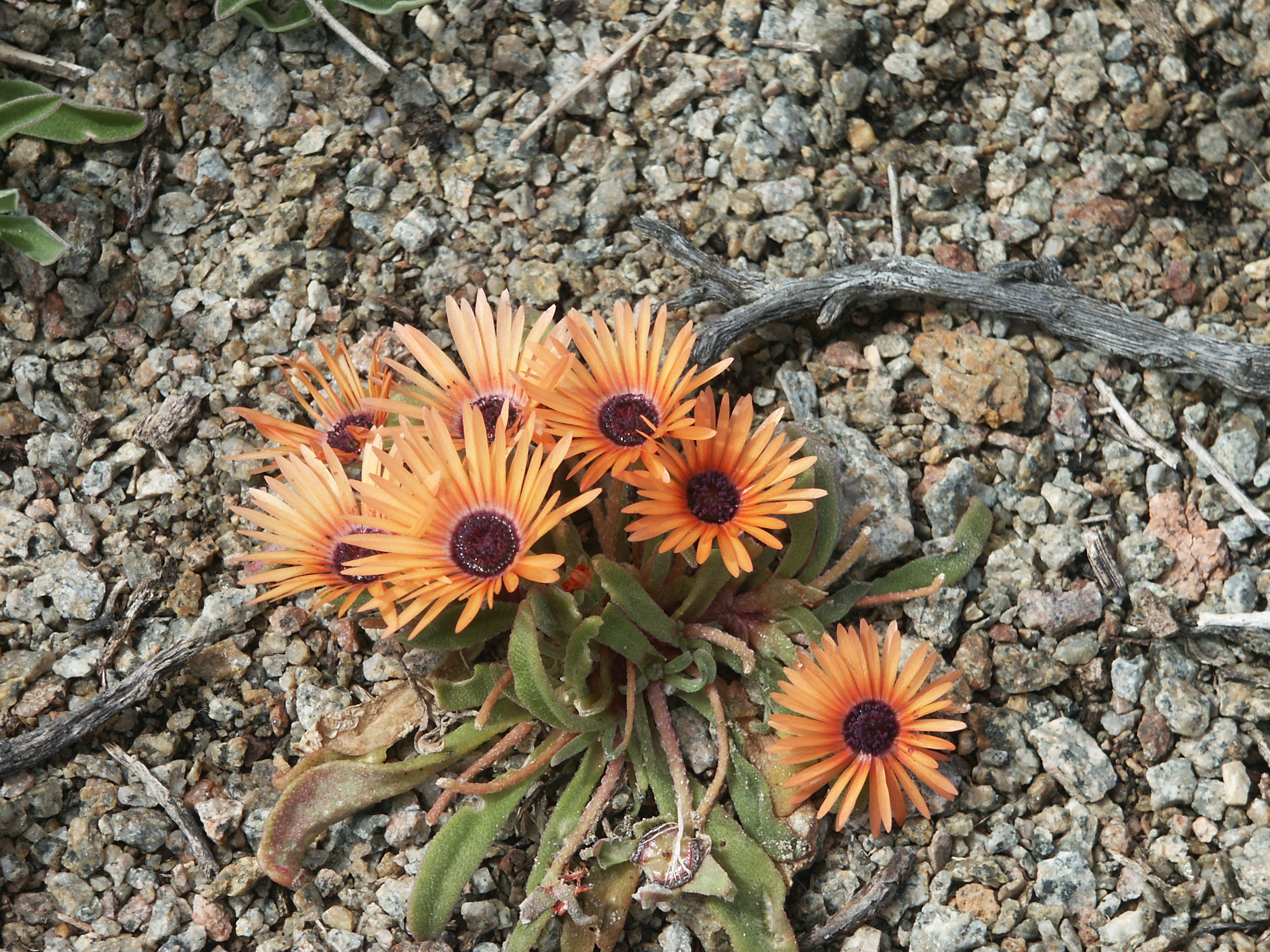
Livingstone daisy, C. bellidiforme in the park

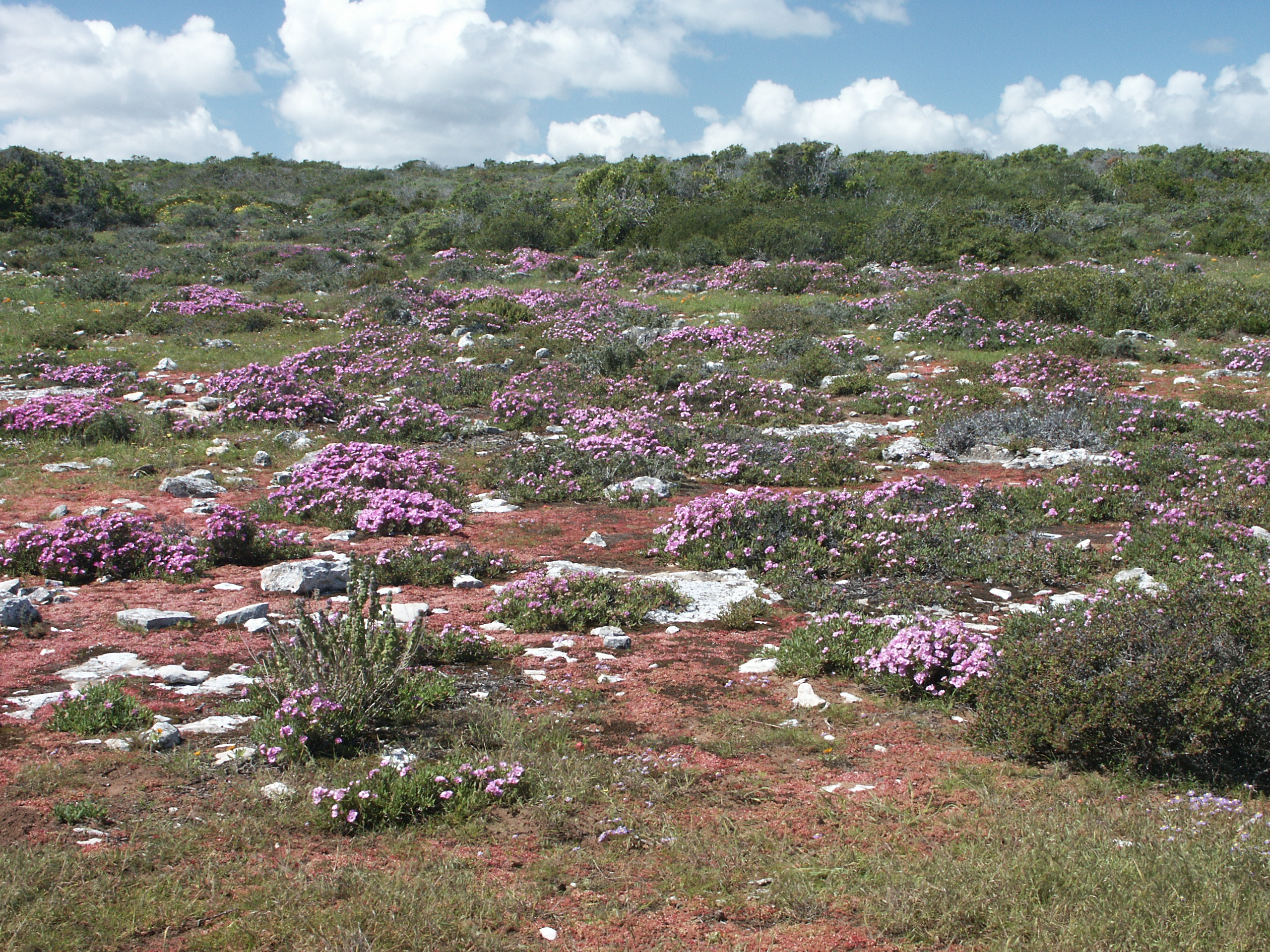
Spring flowers in the park

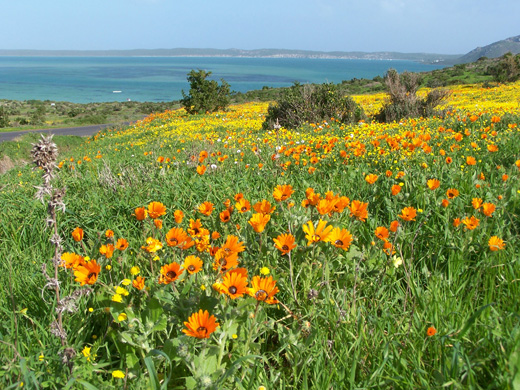
A field of flowers in the park

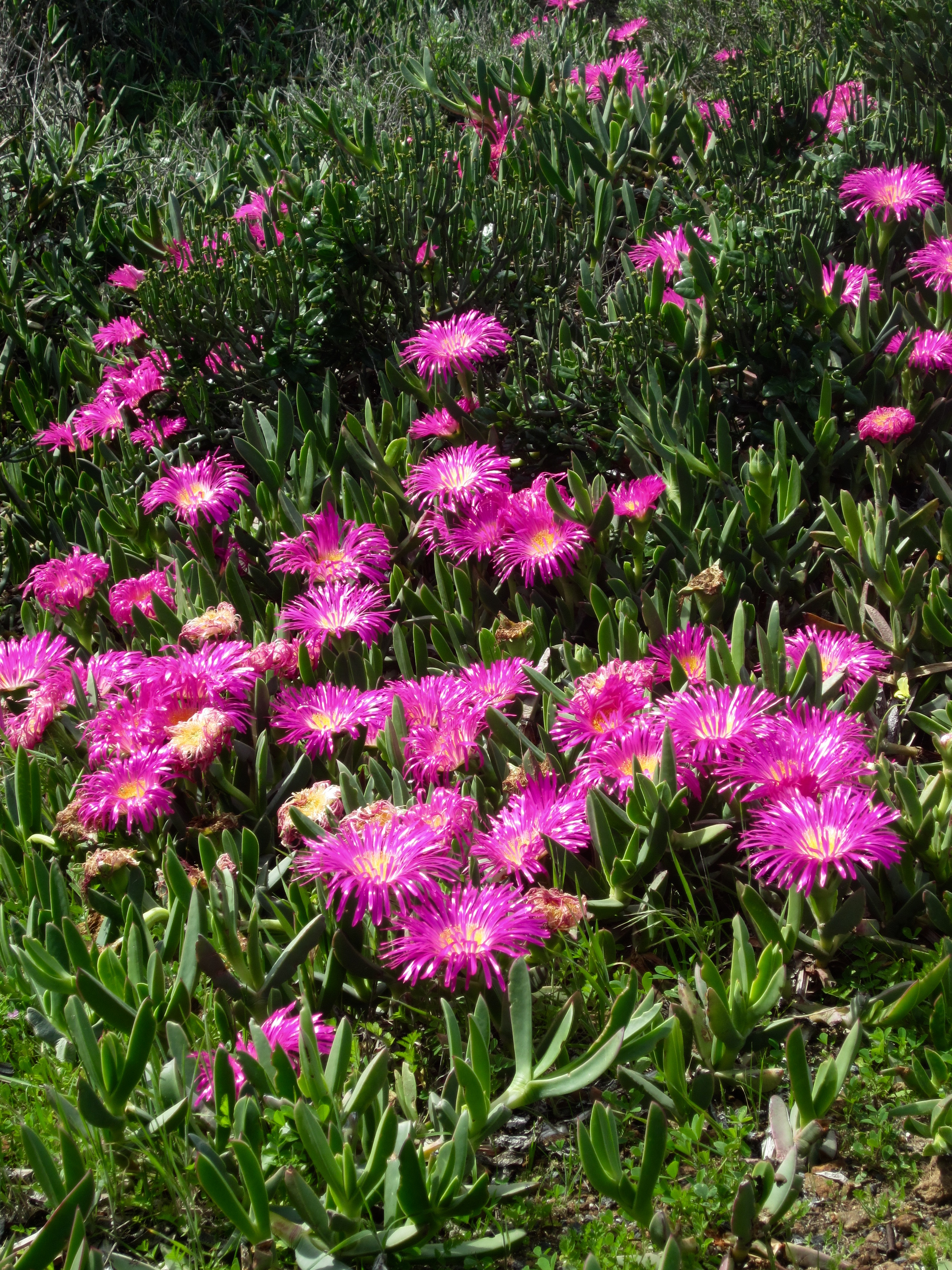
Spring flowers in the Postberg area during August to September

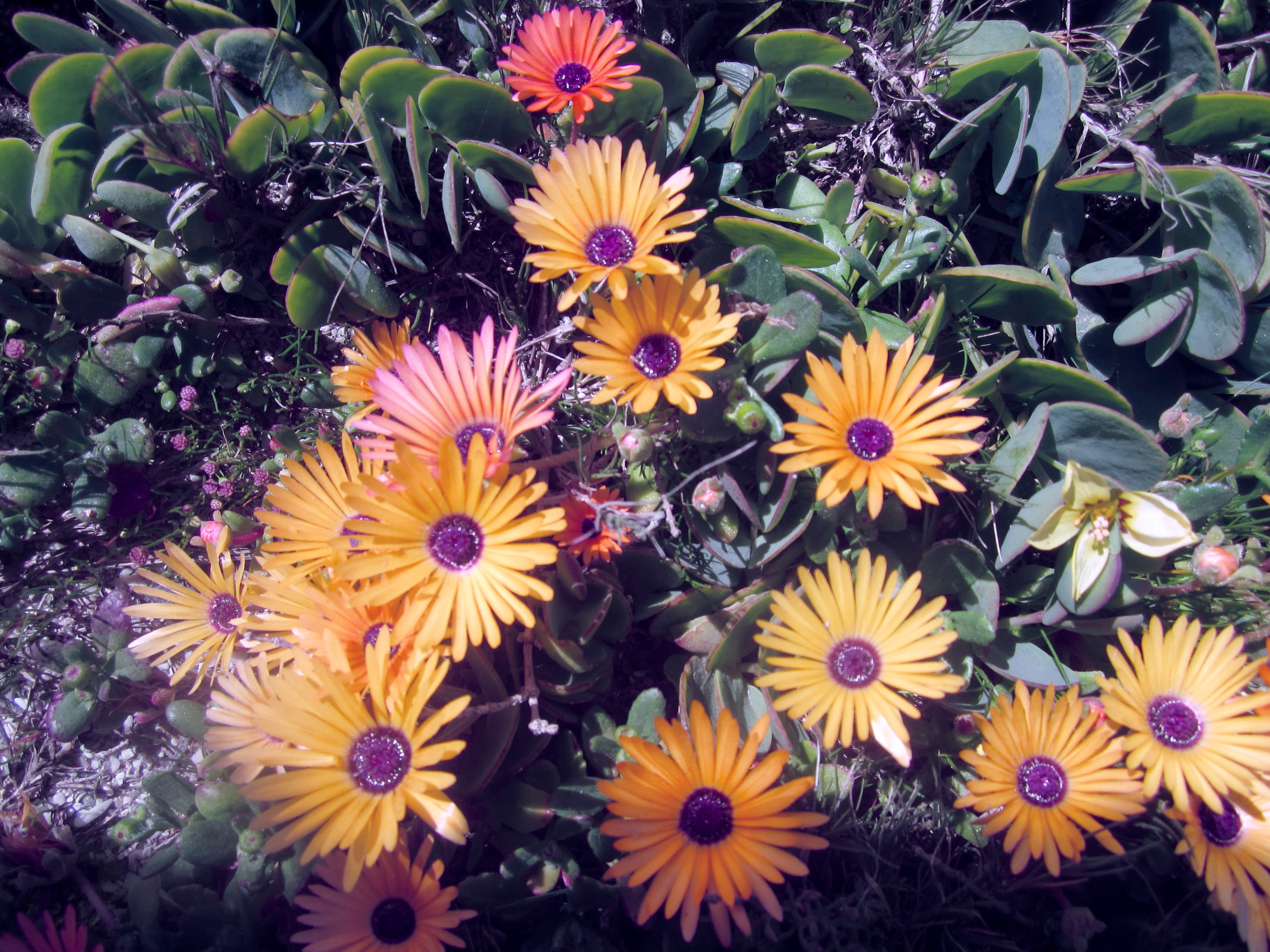
Spring flowers in the Postberg area during August to September

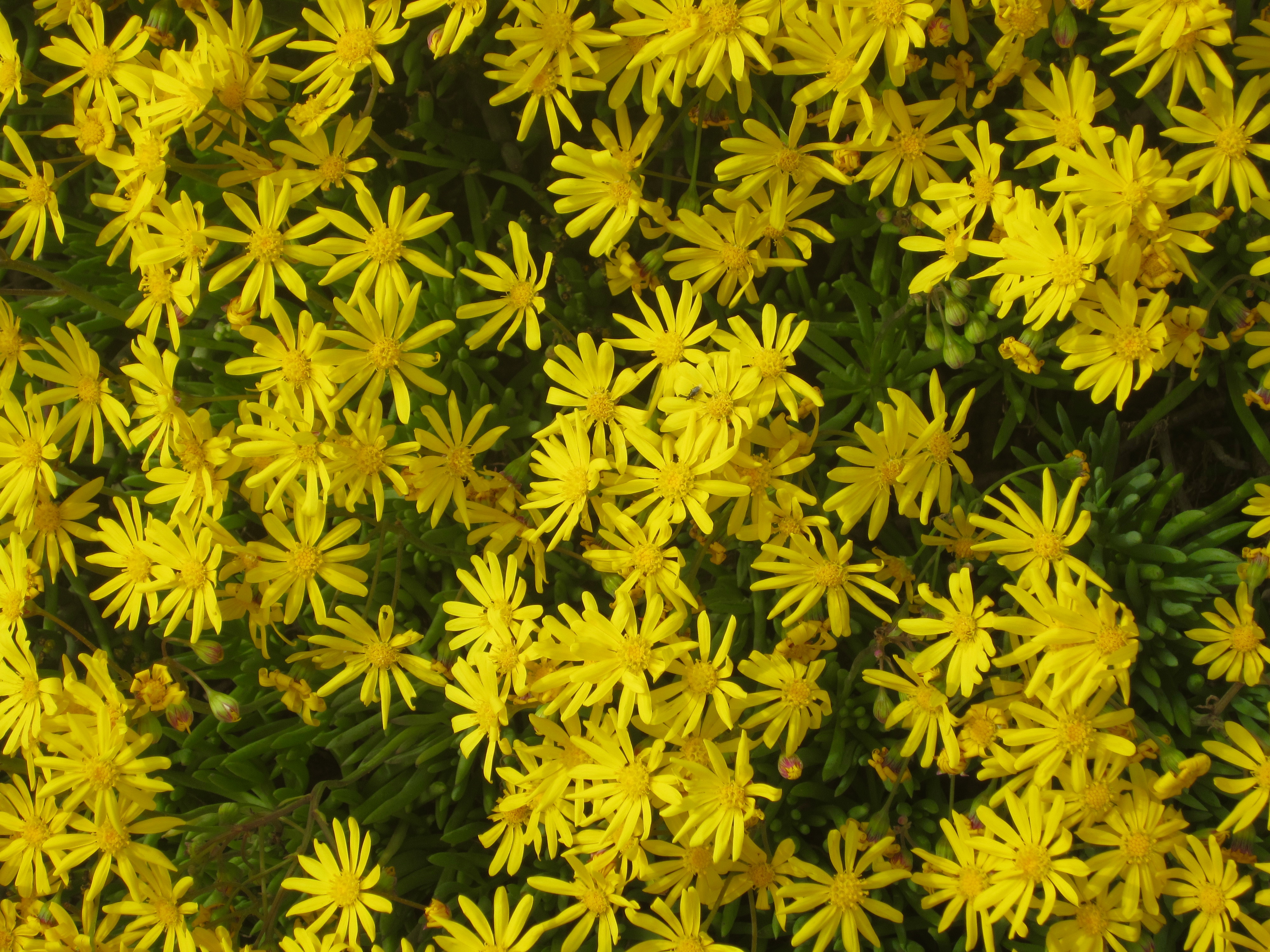
Spring flowers in the Postberg area during August to September

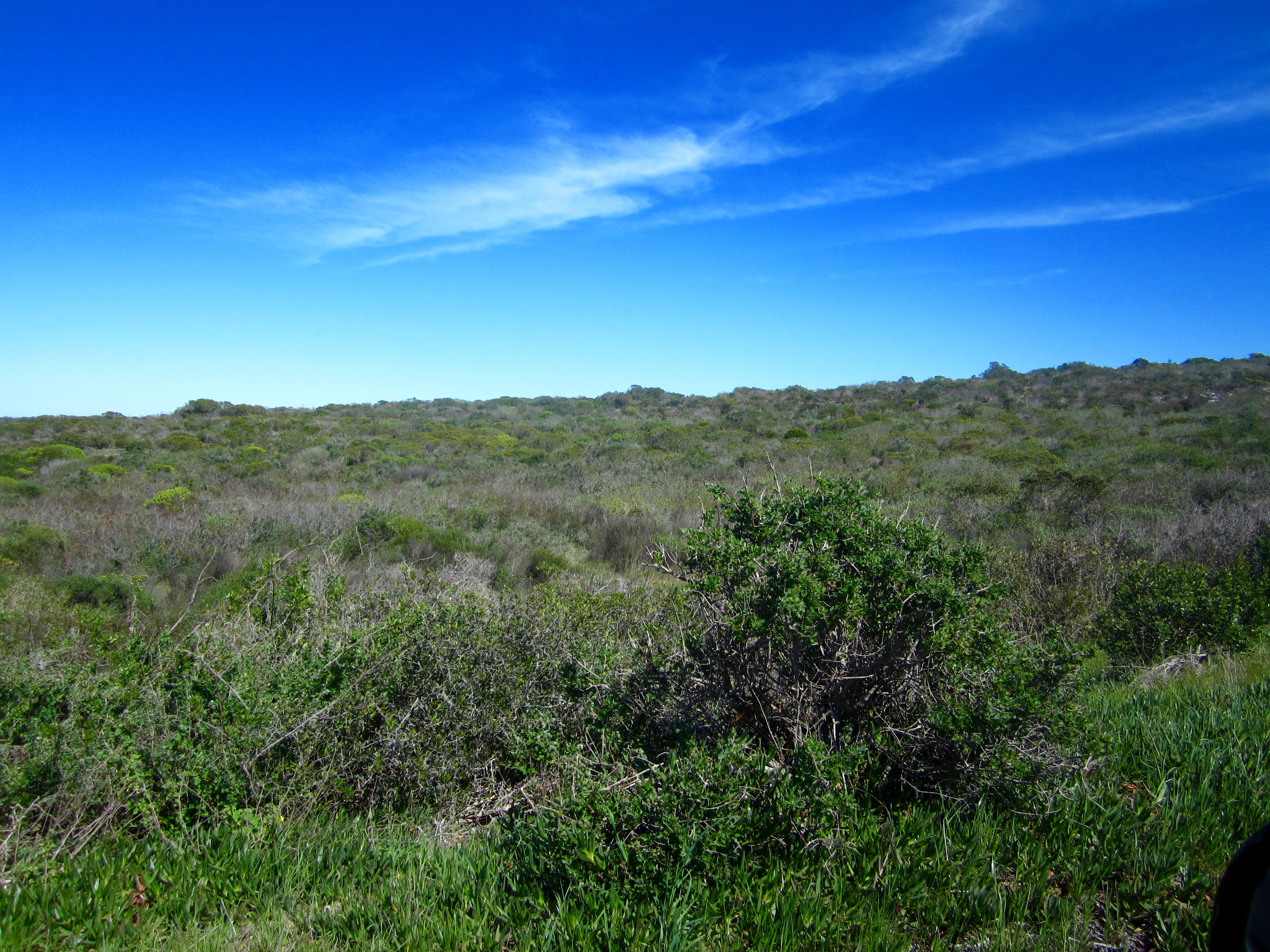
Spring flowers in the Postberg area during August to September

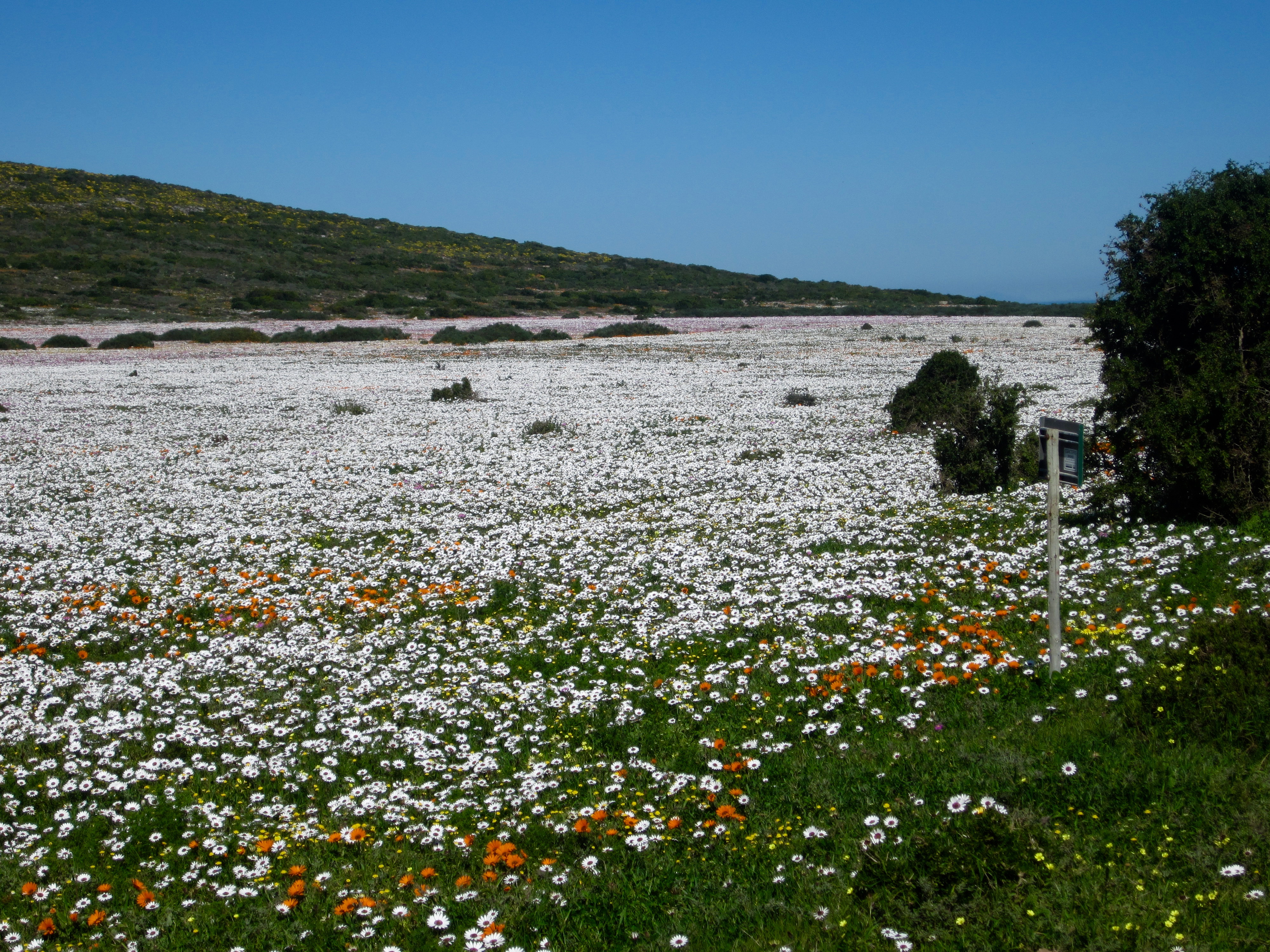
Spring flowers in the Postberg area during August to September

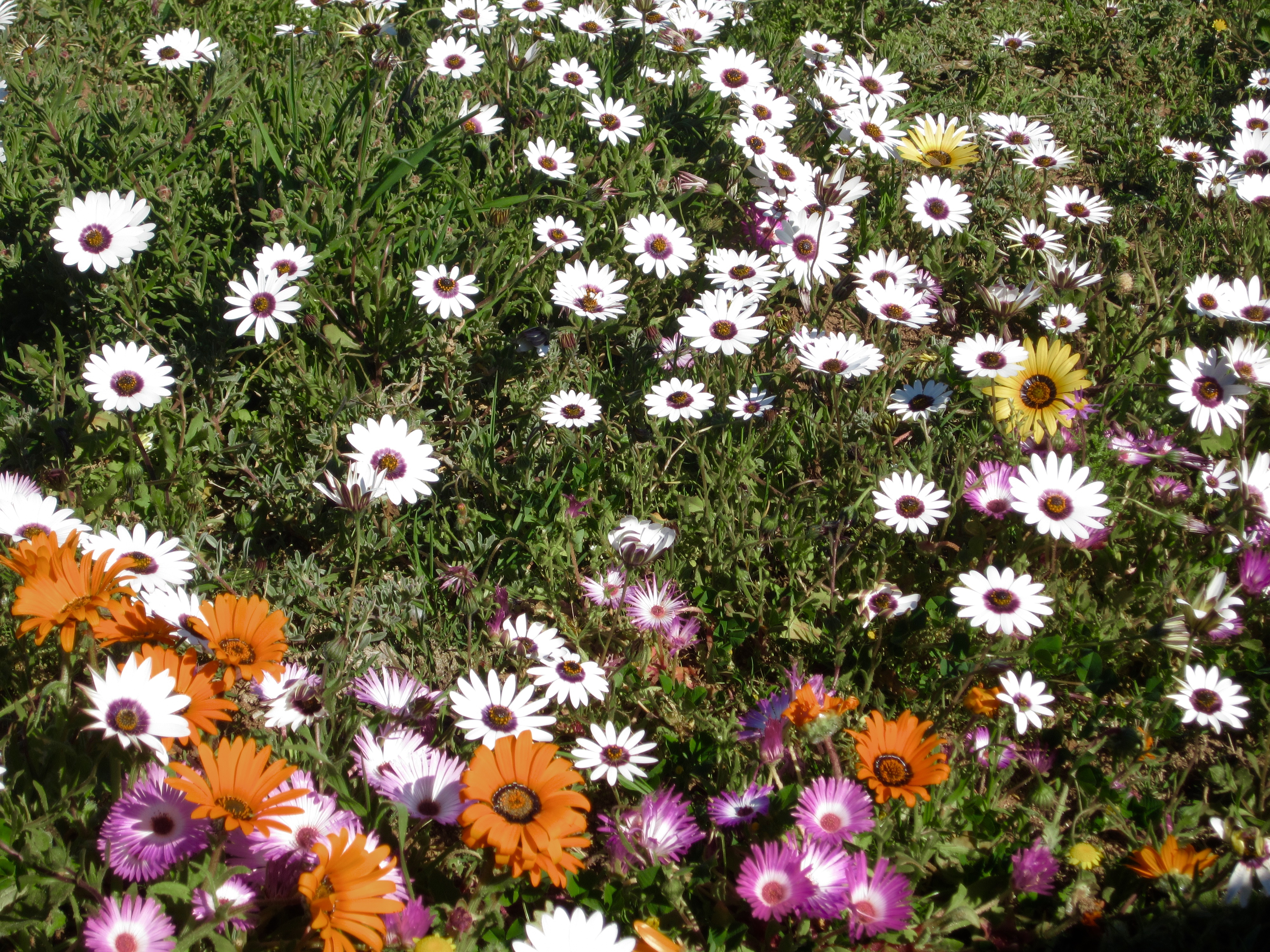
Spring flowers in the Postberg area during August to September

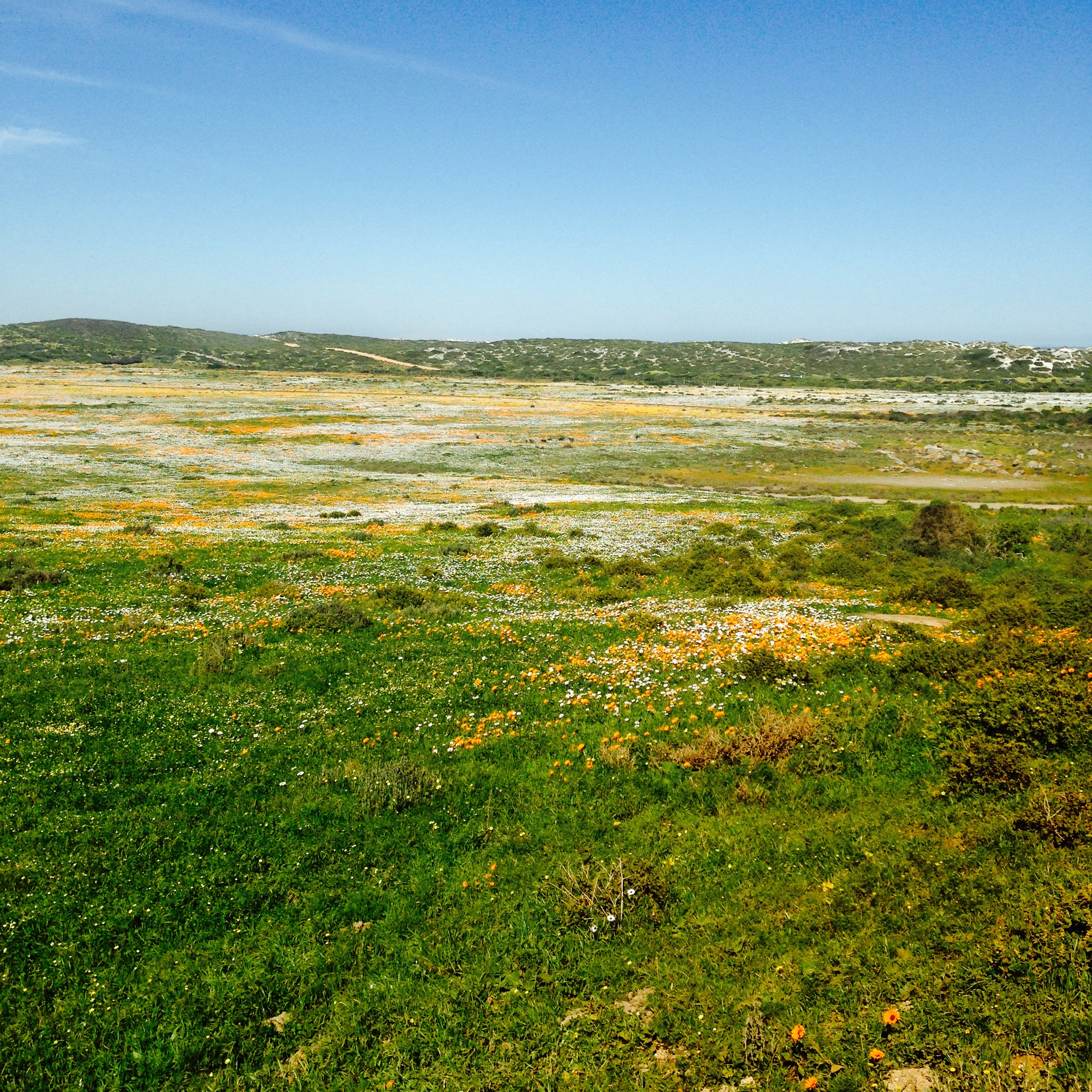
Spring flowers in the Postberg area during August to September

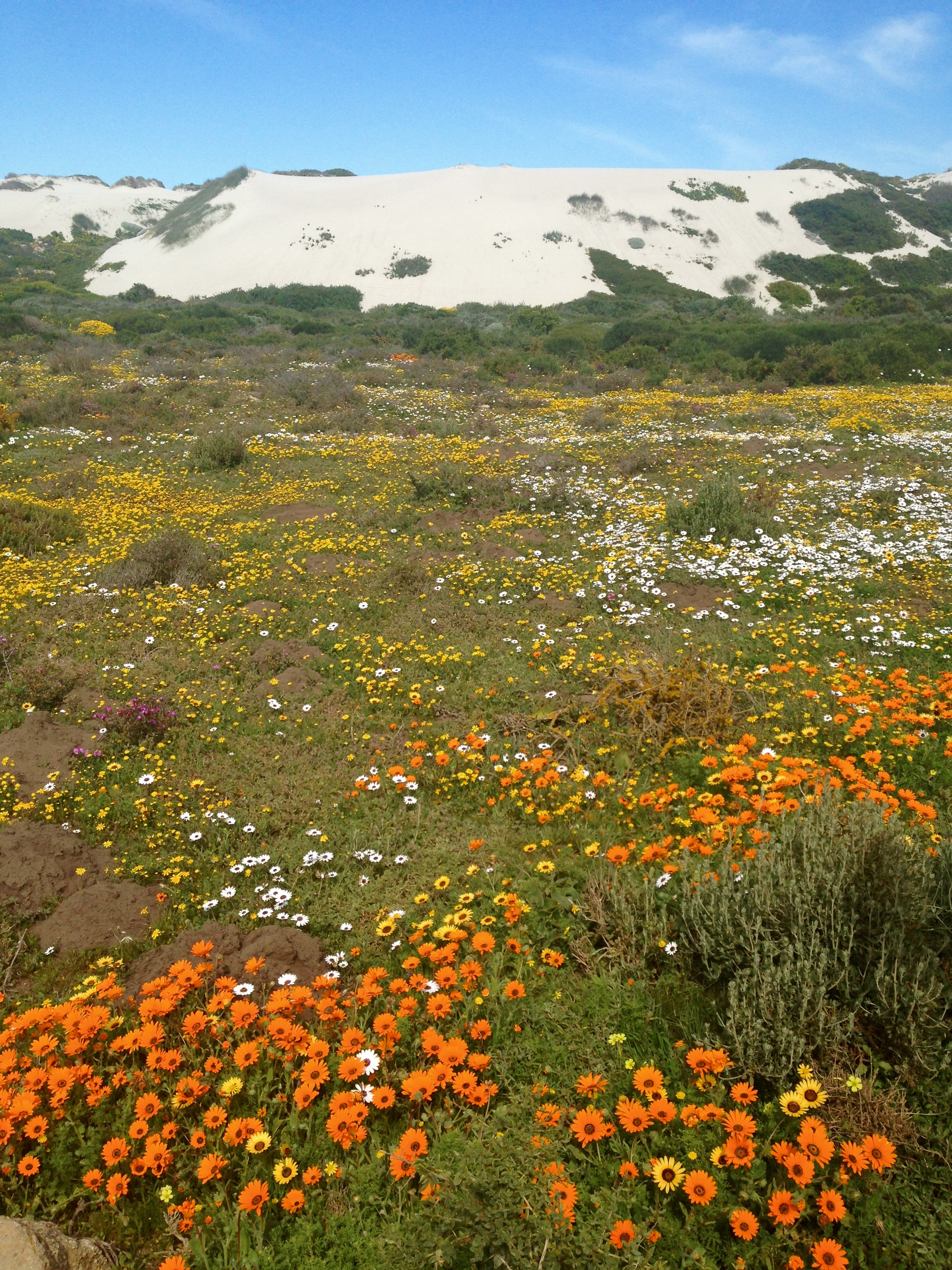
Spring flowers in the Postberg area as they appear from August to September

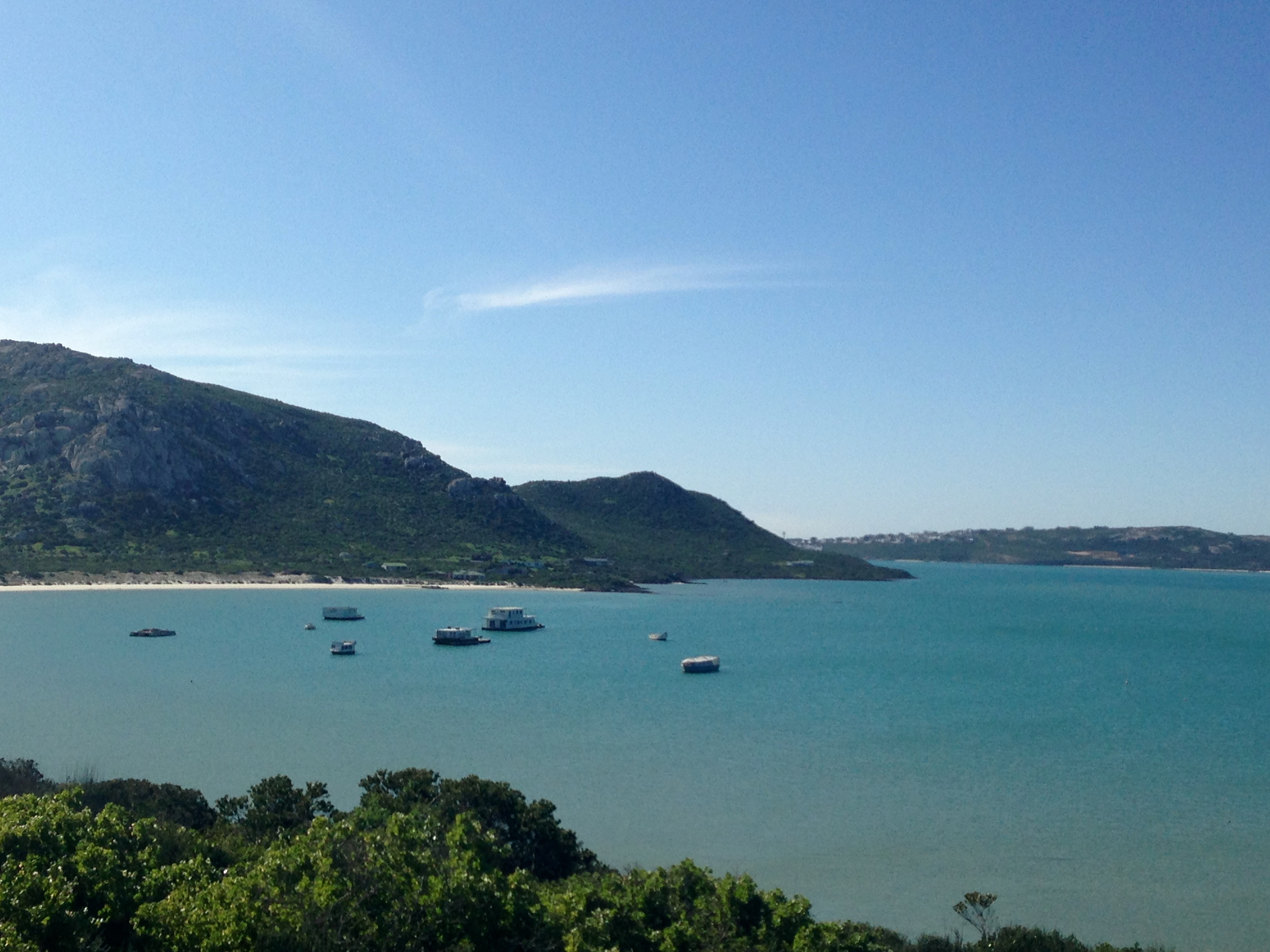
View of the Langebaan Lagoon seen from the west side of the park

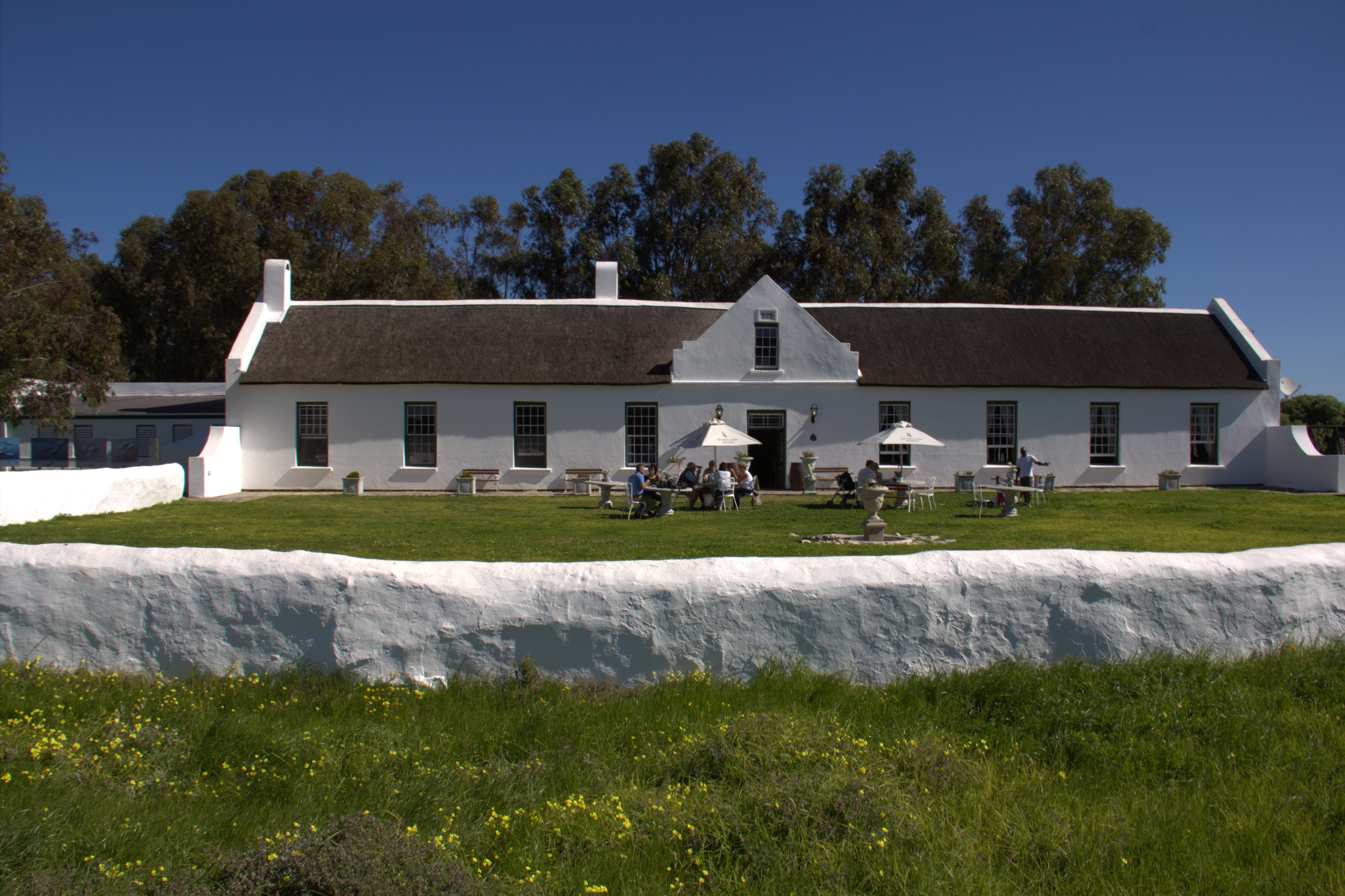
Geelbek Restaurant in West Coast National Park

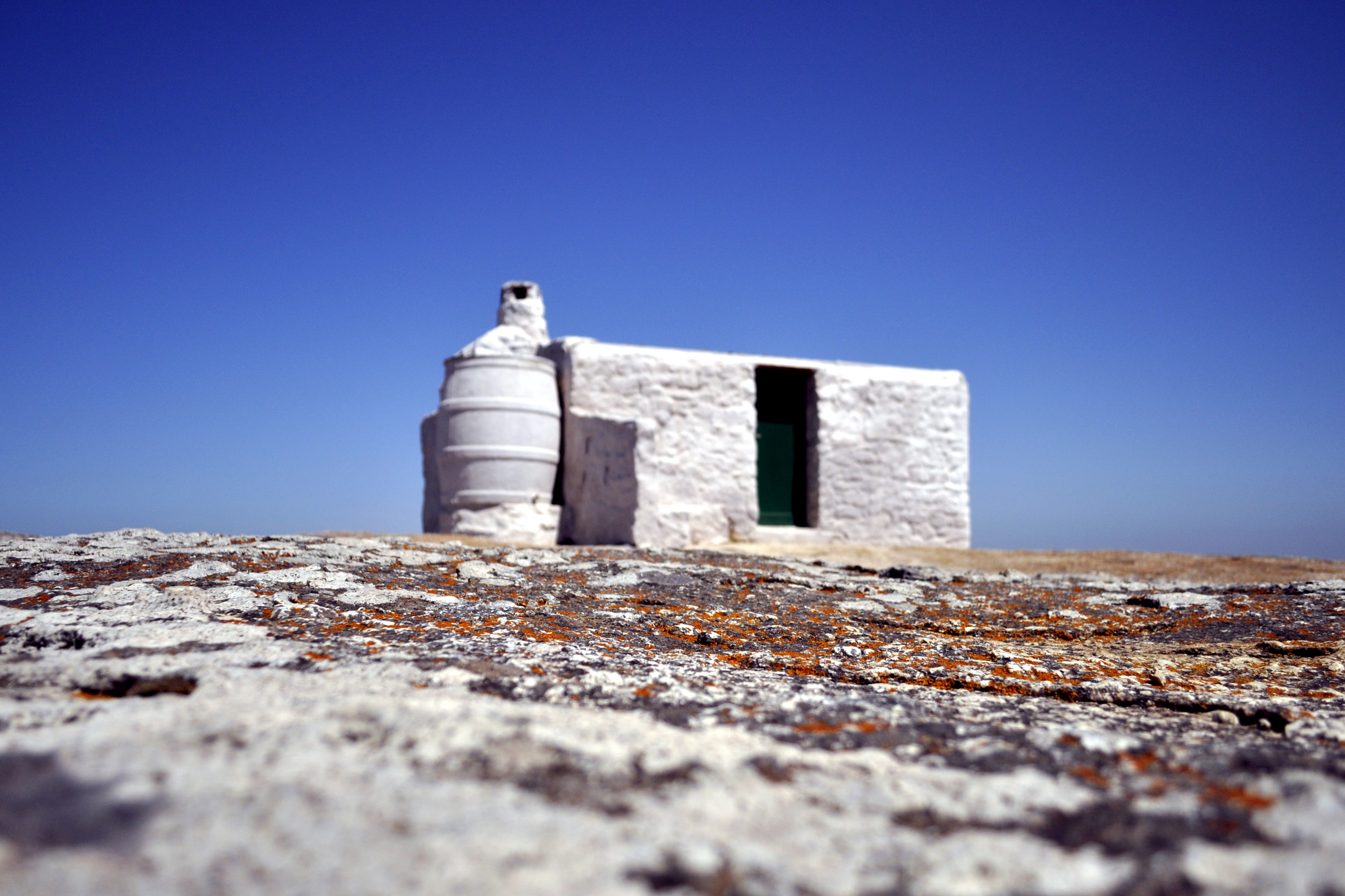
Abandoned historic shepherds hut located in the park

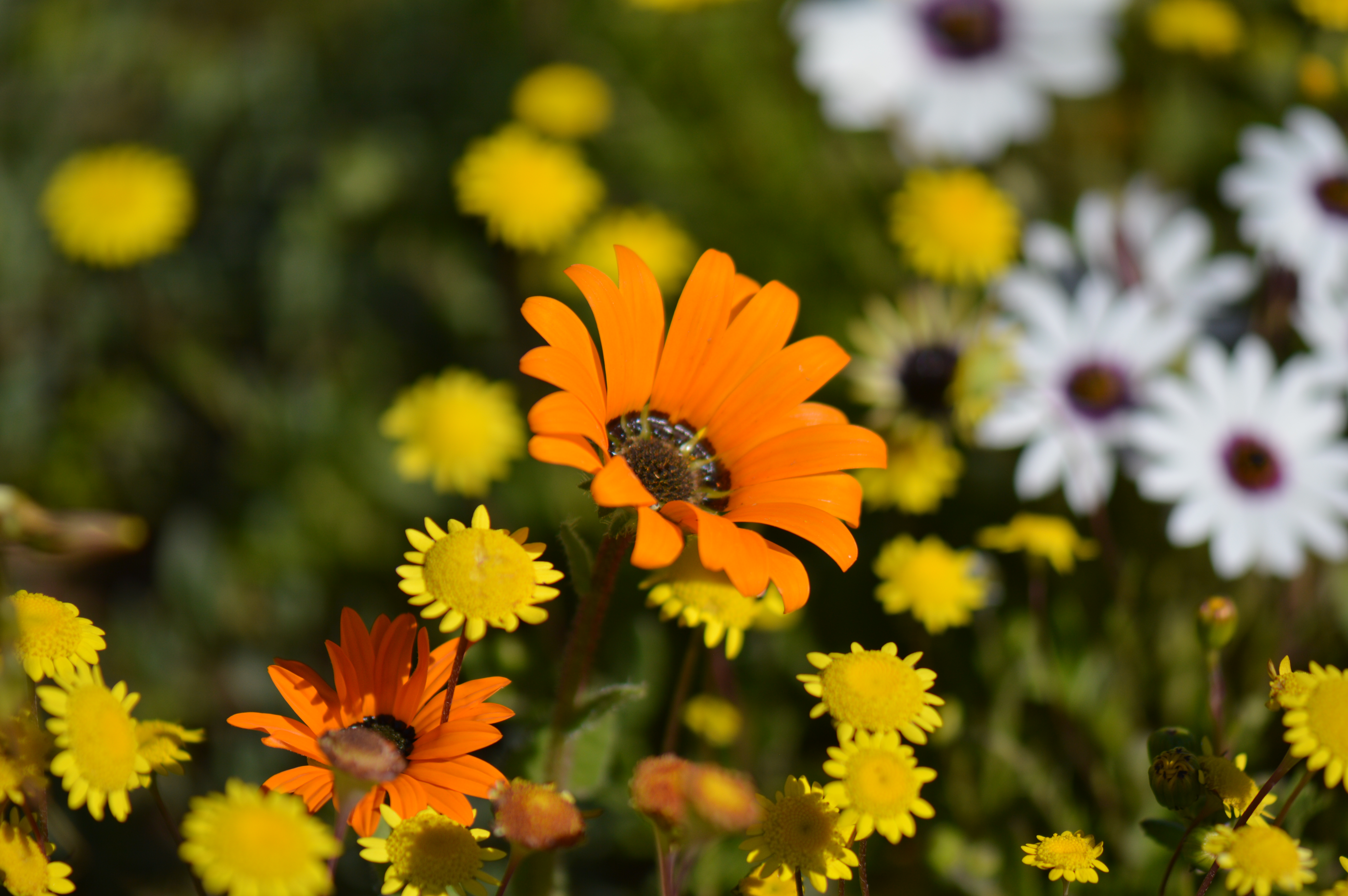
Gousblom flowering alongside smaller yellow flowers (possibly Cotula sericea)

== See also ==
- Eve's footprint
