= Eve's footprint =

Hominin fossil

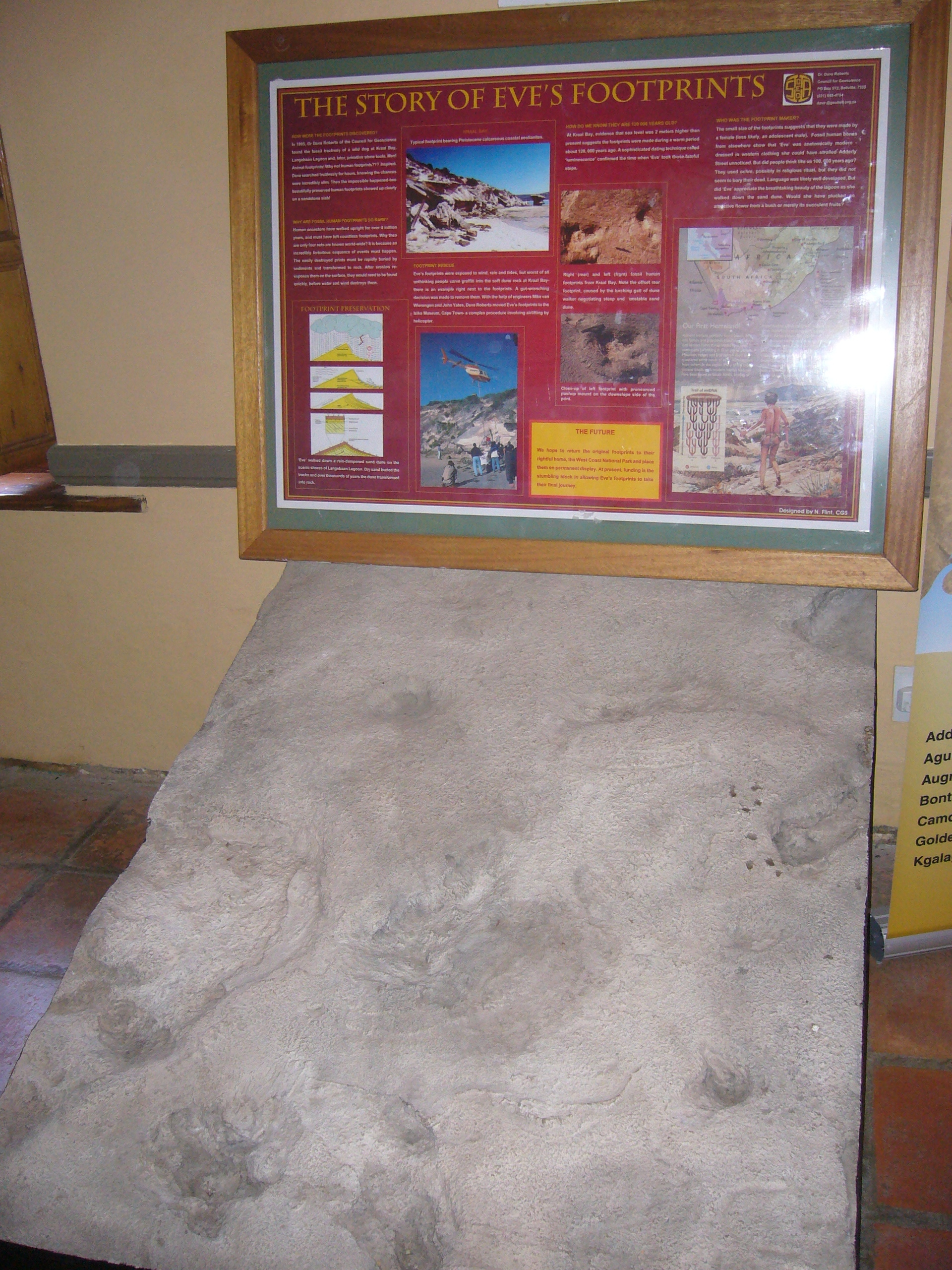
- Replica of Eve's footprint. Geelbek Visitors Centre, West Coast National Park, Western Cape, South Africa
- Catalog no.: {{{catalog_number}}}
- Common name: Eve's footprint
- Age: 117 000 years
- Place discovered: Langebaan, South Africa
- Date discovered: September 1995
- Discovered by: David Roberts

Eve's footprint is the popular name for a set of fossilised footprints discovered on the shore of Langebaan Lagoon, South Africa in 1995. They are thought to be those of a female human and have been dated to approximately 117,000 years ago. This makes them the oldest known footprints of an anatomically modern human. The estimated age of Eve's footprint means that the individual who left the tracks in the soil, thought to be female, would have lived within the current wide range of estimates for the date of Mitochondrial Eve.

== History ==
The three footprints were found in 1995 by geologist David Roberts from the Council for Geoscience and announced at a press conference with paleoanthropologist Lee R. Berger of the University of the Witwatersrand at Johannesburg, South Africa, at the National Geographic Society in Washington, D.C. The discovery was documented in the August 1997 issue of the South African Journal of Science.

Berger and Roberts say the prints were made on a steep sand dune during a turbulent rainstorm. The location where they were found is in southwest South Africa about 120 kilometres (75 mi) northwest of Cape Town in the West Coast National Park. They were found in a ledge of sandstone at the edge of Langebaan Lagoon near the Atlantic coast. The preserved prints were moved to the South African Museum in Cape Town for protection and a concrete replica was mounted on the shores of Langebaan.

The maker of the footprints lived in the time of the emergence of modern Homo sapiens, or people anatomically similar to humans alive today. The footprints measure 22 centimetres (8.7 in) in length (the width of the distal ends of the metatarsals are 8.5 centimetres (3.3 in)) and are about the size of a modern-day (U.S.) woman's size 7½ shoe (British size 6, continental European size 39½). In one foot impression the big toe, ball, arch, and heel are clearly discernible, with a maximum depression of 3.2 cm. Roberts thinks that the prints belong to an ancient female about 1.5 metres (4 feet 11 inches) tall. He said that the woman who made these footprints would resemble a contemporary woman. The heel-to-heel stride length is 51 centimetres (20 in).

Fewer than three dozen hominid fossils from the period 100,000 to 200,000 years ago have been found. Berger said, "These footprints are traces of the earliest modern people." Roberts explained further that dry sand blew over the wet footprints and filled the prints. They eventually were buried to a depth of about 9 metres (30 ft). The sand and accompanying crushed seashells hardened like cement into sedimentary rock and protected the footprints.

The team later found associated evidence of stone tool use (a core, scrapers, cutting blades, and a spear point) in the same area that is believed to date from the same period. There was also evidence of the use of ochre, leading to the intriguing possibility that the 'Eve' of 117,000 years ago may have been wearing the colourful powder.

== See also ==
- Ancient footprints of Acahualinca – late Holocene human footprints found near the shore of Lake Managua in Nicaragua, dating to approximately 2,120 years ago.
- Happisburgh footprints – early Pleistocene fossilised hominid footprints found in a sediment layer on a beach at Happisburgh in Norfolk, England, dating to more than 800,000 years ago,
- Ileret – footprints of Homo erectus found at Ileret, Northern Kenya, dating to approximately 1.5 million years ago.
- Laetoli footprints – a line of hominid footprints, discovered at Laetoli, Tanzania by Mary Leakey in 1976, dating to approximately 3.6 million years ago.
- List of fossil sites (with link directory)
- List of hominina (hominid) fossils (with images)
