= Langebaan =

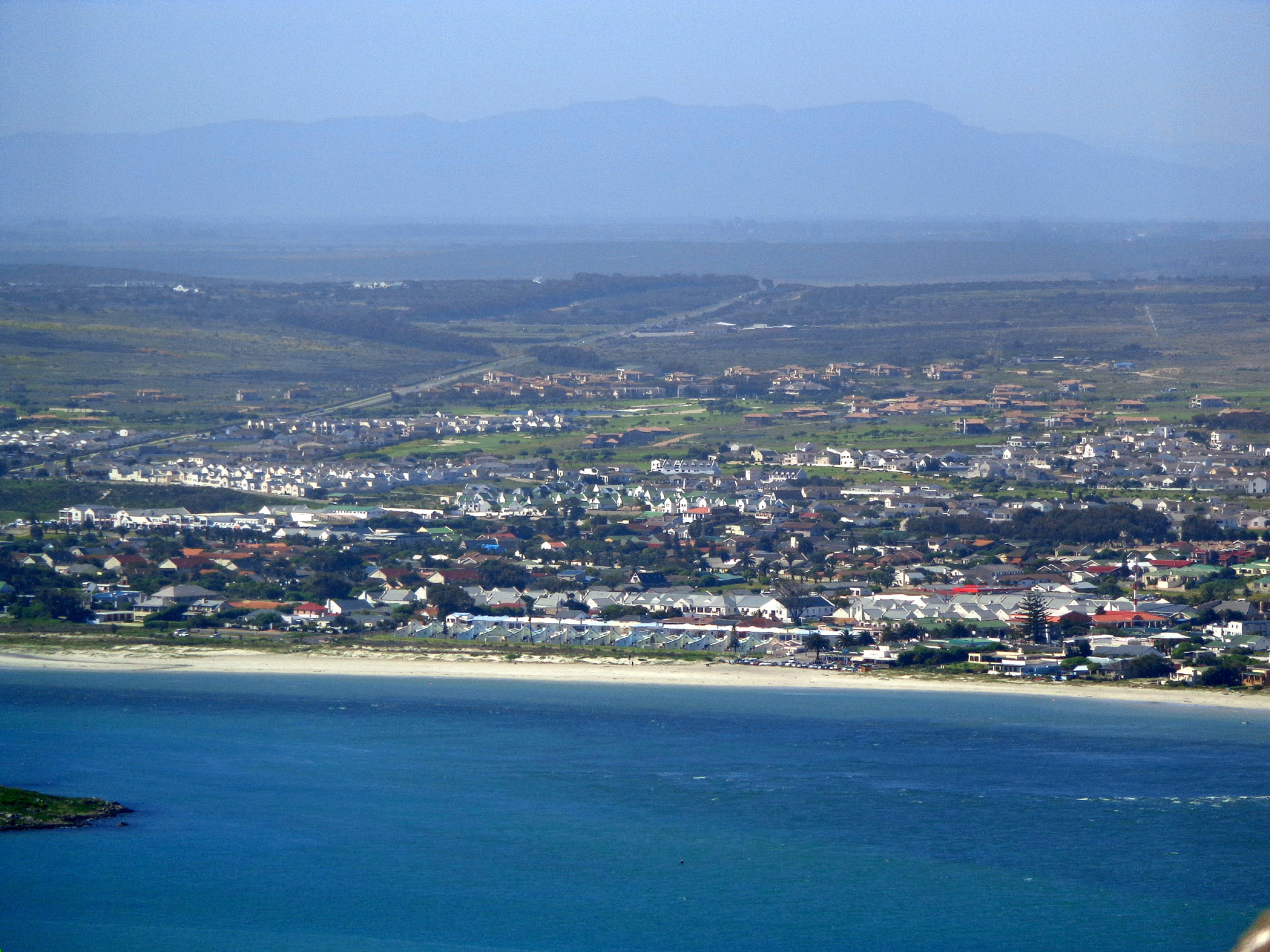
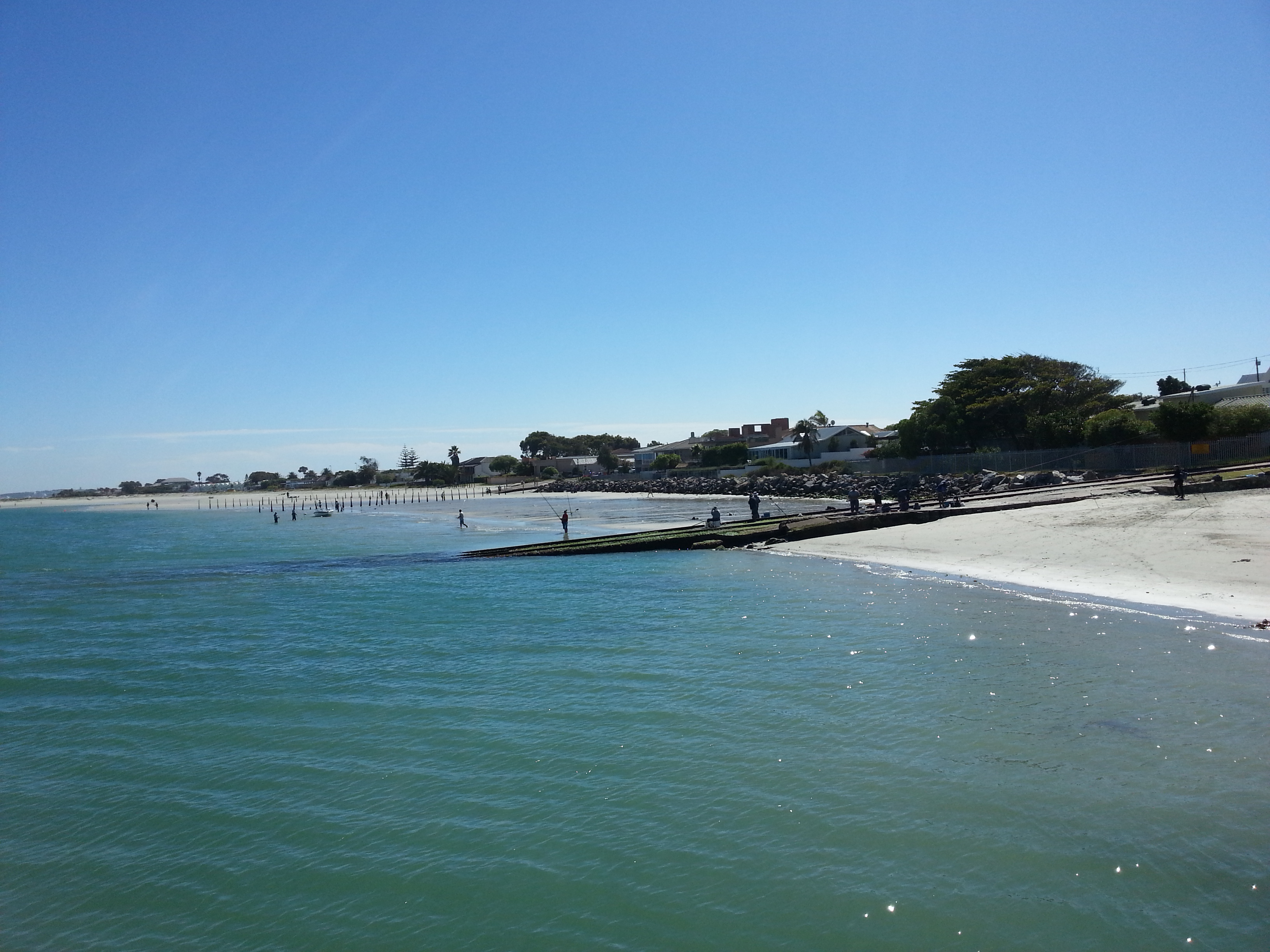
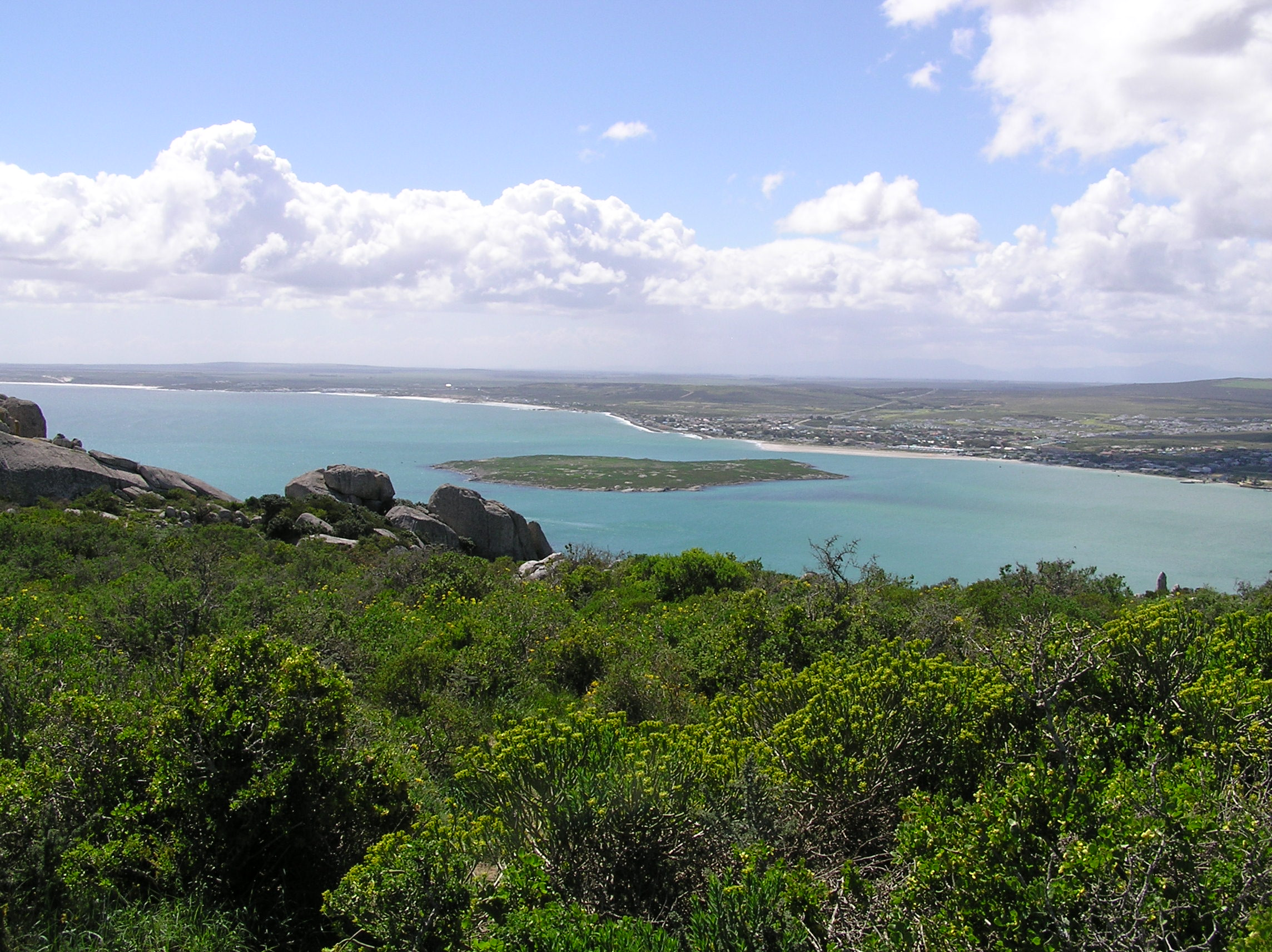
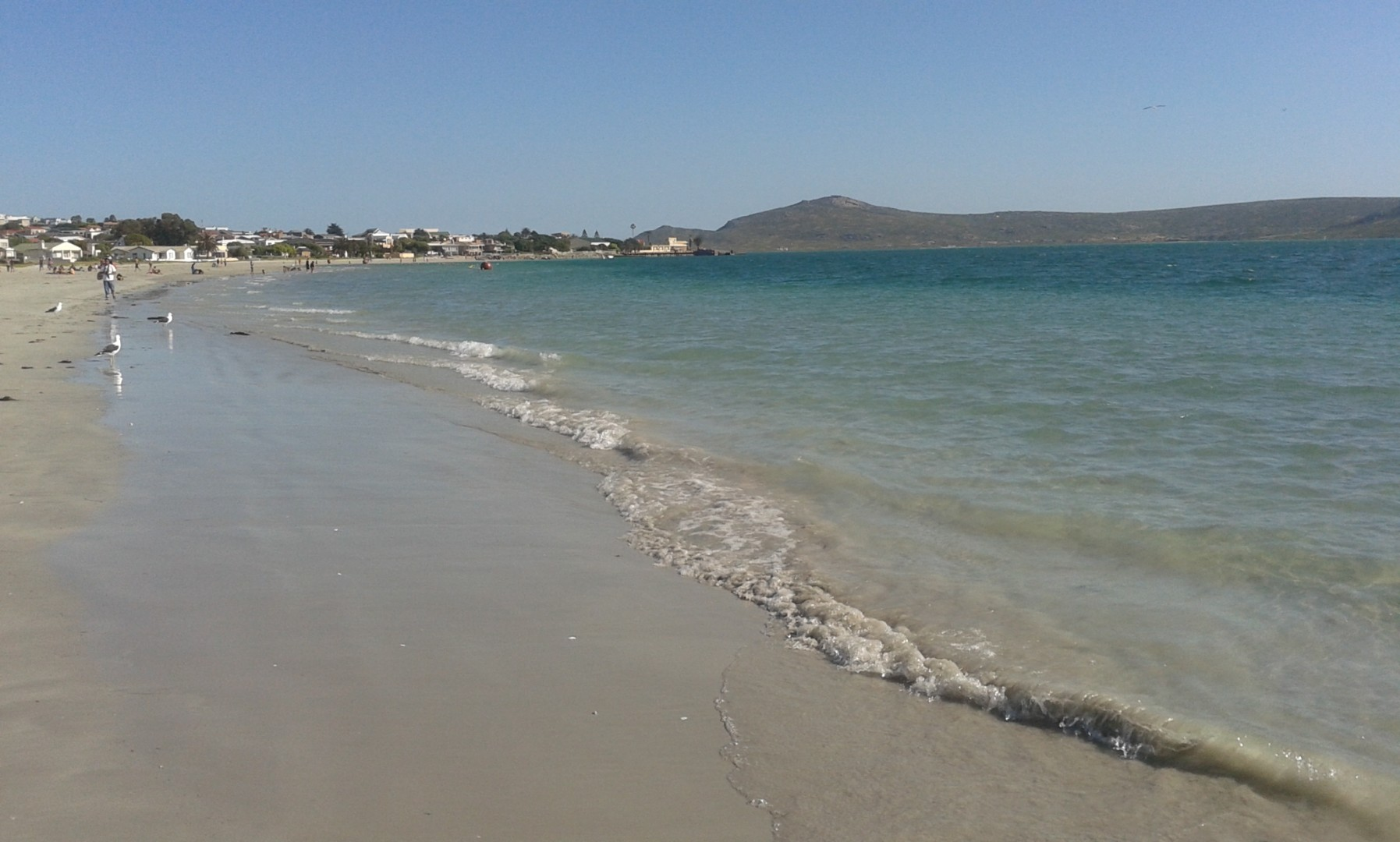
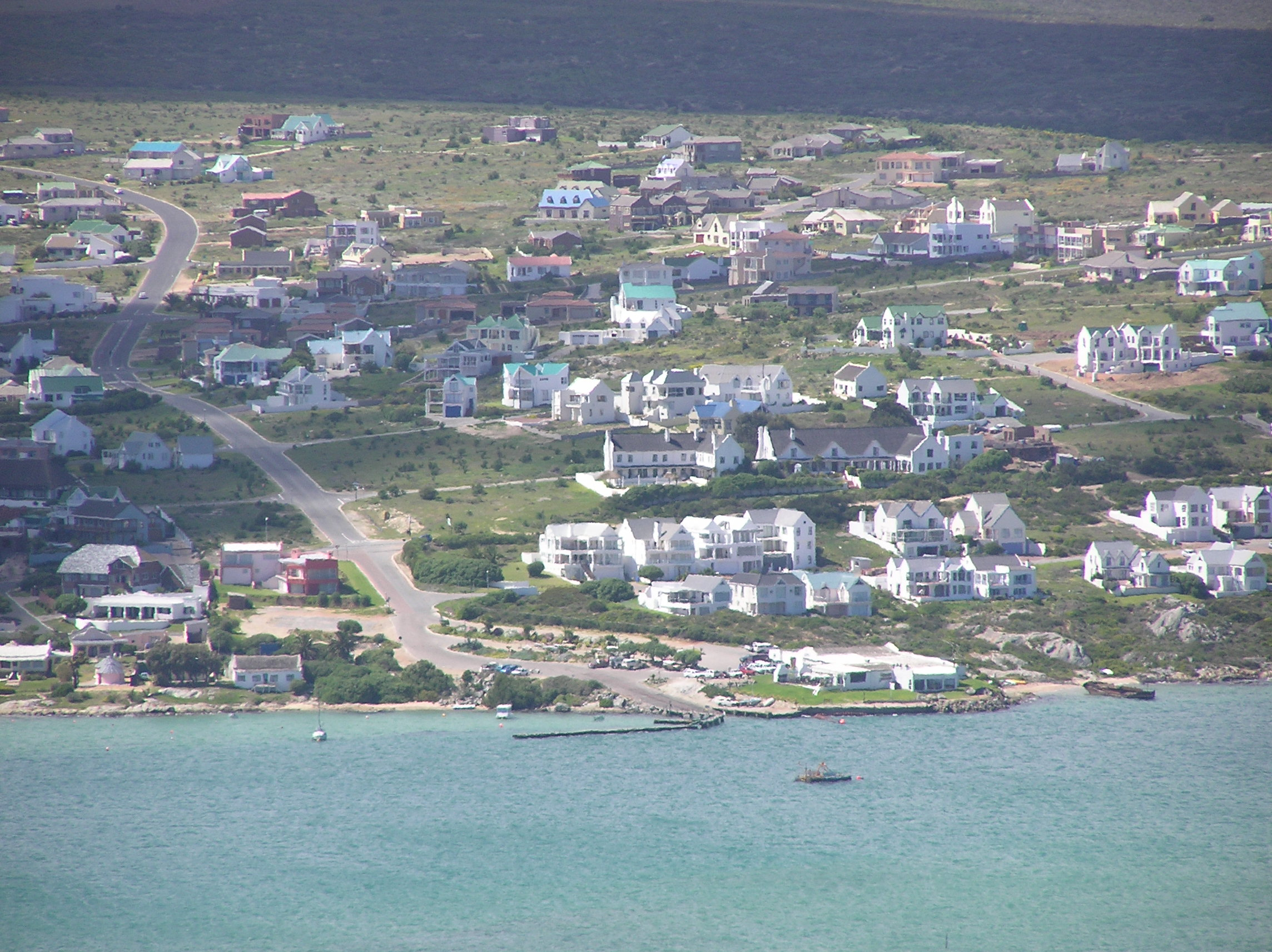
- Top: Langebaan as viewed from Postberg, West Coast National Park, with Engelsman se Baken mountains in the distance. Left: fishermen at the Langebaan pier. Right: Langebaan seen from across the Langebaan lagoon. Bottom left: Langebaan beach. Bottom right: an aerial view of Lanagebaan pier and central area from the West Coast National park.

- Location within Western Cape Location within South Africa Location within Africa
- Coordinates: 33°5′30″S 18°2′0″E
- Country: South Africa
- Province: Western Cape
- District: West Coast
- Municipality: Saldanha Bay

Area
  - Total: 20.17 km^{2} (7.79 sq mi)

Population (2011)
  - Total: 8,297
  - Density: 411.4/km^{2} (1,065/sq mi)

Racial makeup (2011)
  - Black African: 7.4%
  - Coloured: 34.7%
  - Indian/Asian: 0.5%
  - White: 56.0%
  - Other: 1.4%

First languages (2011)
  - Afrikaans: 76.2%
  - English: 19.2%
  - Xhosa: 1.3%
  - Other: 3.3%
- Time zone: UTC+2 (SAST)
- Postal code (street): 7357
- PO box: 7357
- Area code: 022

Langebaan is a town in the Western Cape province of South Africa on the eastern shore of Langebaan Lagoon.

Langebaan is situated 120 km north of Cape Town, just off the R27, about 28 km from Vredenburg and 20 km from Saldanha Bay. The Lagoon stretches for 17 km from Saldanha Bay, past Langebaan to Geelbek in the South. In places it is up to 4 km wide.

== History ==
The Langebaan Lagoon was formed by the rising and drop of sea levels during pre-historic times. This is unlike most lagoons which form where fresh water rivers enter the sea. As a result, Langebaan Lagoon is purely a salt water lagoon.

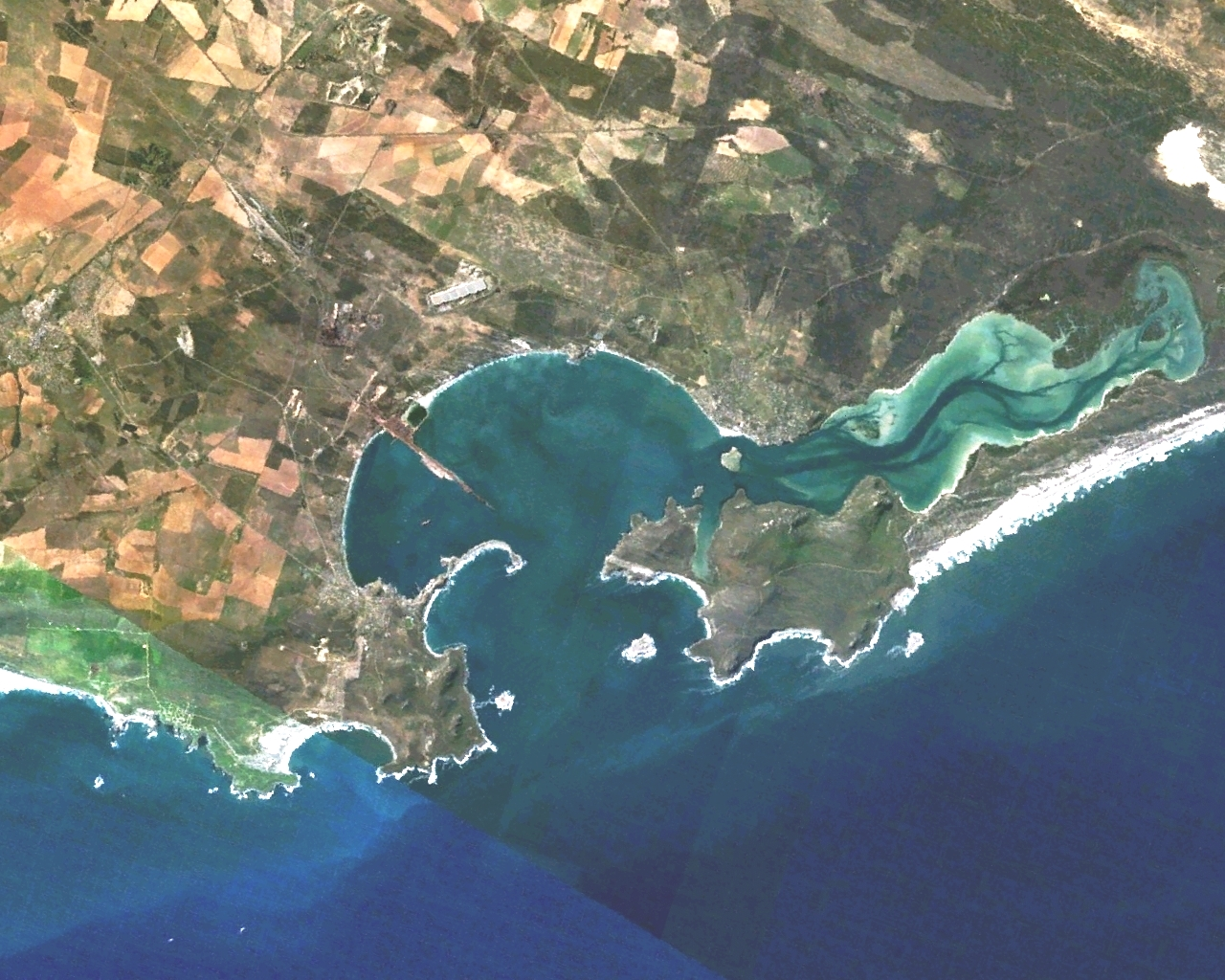
Satellite image of Saldanha Bay, with Langebaan Lagoon to the right (south). Langebaan town is just right of center.

As far back as 500 000 years ago, early Homo sapiens were probably present in the area, living in groups and hunting small game, displacing carnivores, such as lions, from their kills and gathering plant foods. They made fire as protection and for cooking and probably made simple shelters from branches. They used animal skins for warmth and clothing, and also made wooden and stone tools, as evidence of these found here proves. Eve's footprint is the oldest known footprints of an anatomically-modern human.

The area is rich in historical events from the first inhabitants, the Khoikhoi and San, to the arrival of the Europeans. The first European to set foot on land was Vasco da Gama at St Helena Bay on the West Coast Peninsula in 1497.

António de Saldanha, after whom the bay is named, did not enter those waters at all. Juris van Spilbergen mistakenly named it in 1601 as Saldanha Bay; he thought that he had reached Cape Town – originally named Agoada de Saldanha. Although the Dutch were the first to claim ownership of the area, the French were frequent visitors.

Foreign nations would claim ownership by planting a post in the ground and formally declaring ownership. One of these ‘posts’ may be seen today near Geelbek claiming the land on behalf of the Dutch East India Company. Such a marker was also found by Gert Hendrik van Wyk on Schaapeneiland. European settlement was very limited because of the lack of water for 8 months of the year.

Many stirring events have occurred in the region over the centuries including two sea battles and a visit by the Confederate States of America’s, Alabama, in 1863, the most feared warship of its day. Even the five islands in the area, which are administered by the West Coast National Park, have a history of their own, including battles for ownership, use as smallpox quarantine hospitals, exploits for guano, sealing centres and other activities.

The French used Schaapeneiland (close to Langebaan beach) as a storage place for whale oil and seal hides, calling it "Isle à la Biche". More recently, the whaling station was situated at Donkergat and is still visible from the town. A reminder of Langebaan's whaling history is the harpoon gun outside the Municipal Buildings.

The town Langebaan was founded in 1922 and used as a whaling station until the 1960s.

== Langebaan today ==
Bird-watchers visit the area to view the over 300 species of birds found in the lagoon waters of the West Coast National Park. The park is most busy during the spring flower season (August to September) when the wild flowers are in bloom. Whales can be spotted during October and November.

To protect its culture as a fishing, holiday and retirement village, the town allows no industries.

Club Mykonos Resort hosts a number of annual events, festivals and exhibitions. Able to accommodate large numbers, the well-known artists are regular performers at this venue. Popular competitions and fund raising events are hosted at the resort.

Large-scale sporting events such as triathlons, the downwind dash, cycling, car gymkhanas and more are held here. A monthly craft market as well as art exhibitions through the year, showcase the talents of local artists. Community events includes the church bazaar and the annual Langebaan Mussel Festival, which takes place on the first weekend of October.

=== Langebaan Lagoon ===
The white sand beaches surrounding the clear waters of the Langebaan Lagoon are one of the main attractions of Langebaan. The mild climate and protected waters of the lagoon make Langebaan popular for sailing, kayaking, kitesurfing and fishing, and the town offers numerous holiday facilities for water sport enthusiasts.

In 1988, the lagoon was declared a Ramsar site, and in 2000 the entire lagoon was designated a marine protected area.
