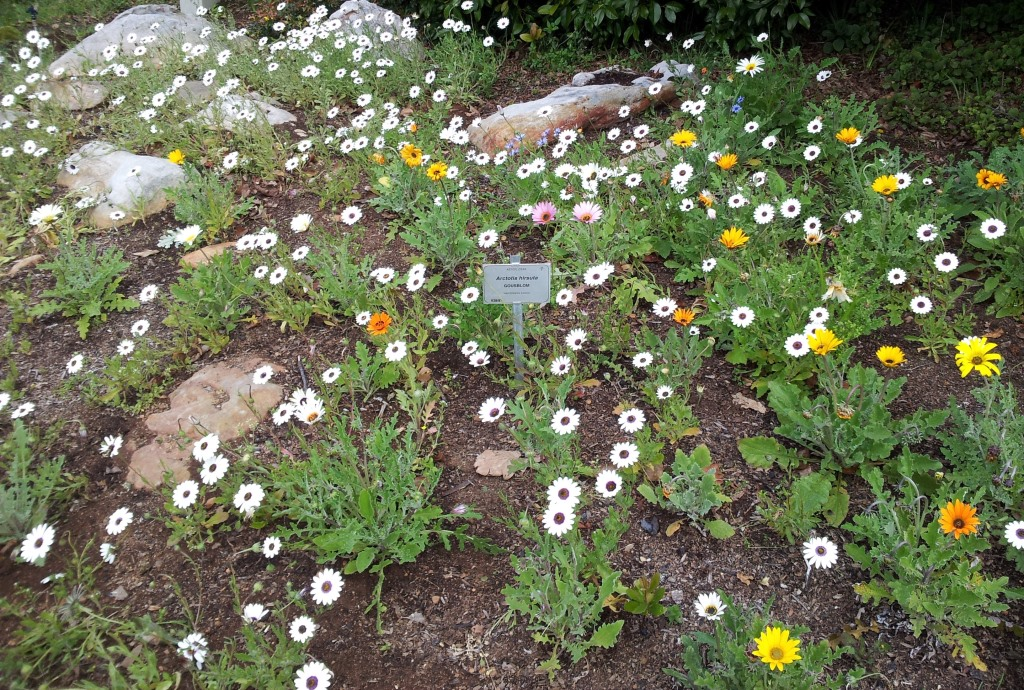
- Arctotis hirsuta flowering in the Northern Cape

Conservation status
- Least Concern (IUCN 3.1)

Scientific classification
- Kingdom: Plantae
- Clade: Tracheophytes
- Clade: Angiosperms
- Clade: Eudicots
- Clade: Asterids
- Order: Asterales
- Family: Asteraceae
- Genus: Arctotis
- Species: A. hirsuta

Binomial name
- Arctotis hirsuta Beauverd

Synonyms
- Antrospermum floribundum Passer.; Antrospermum kraussii Sch.Bip.; Arctotis calendulacea Thunb. ex Harv.; Arctotis fugax Beauverd; Arctotis subacaulis Beauverd; Venidium arctotoides Harv.; Venidium fugax Harv.; Venidium hirsutum Harv.; Venidium hispidulum DC.; Venidium kraussii Sch.Bip.; Venidium speciosum Anon.; Venidium subacaule DC.

= Arctotis hirsuta =

Species of flowering plant in the Asteraceae family

Arctotis hirsuta (Namaqua marigold, gousblom) is a species of flowering plant that is endemic to South Africa. It occurs in the provinces of the Northern Cape and Western Cape. Most typically found on sandy slopes and flats along the coast in the region between Elandsbaai to the Agulhas Plain. During the spring flower season it can flower in large numbers.

It is an annual plant that can reach up to 450 mm in height. It is somewhat fleshy and has a branched stem. The leaves are slightly hairy, which explains the name hirsuta. They grow to 200 mm long. The flowers are orange, yellow or cream-colored and the flower heads are about 40 mm in diameter.

== Gallery ==
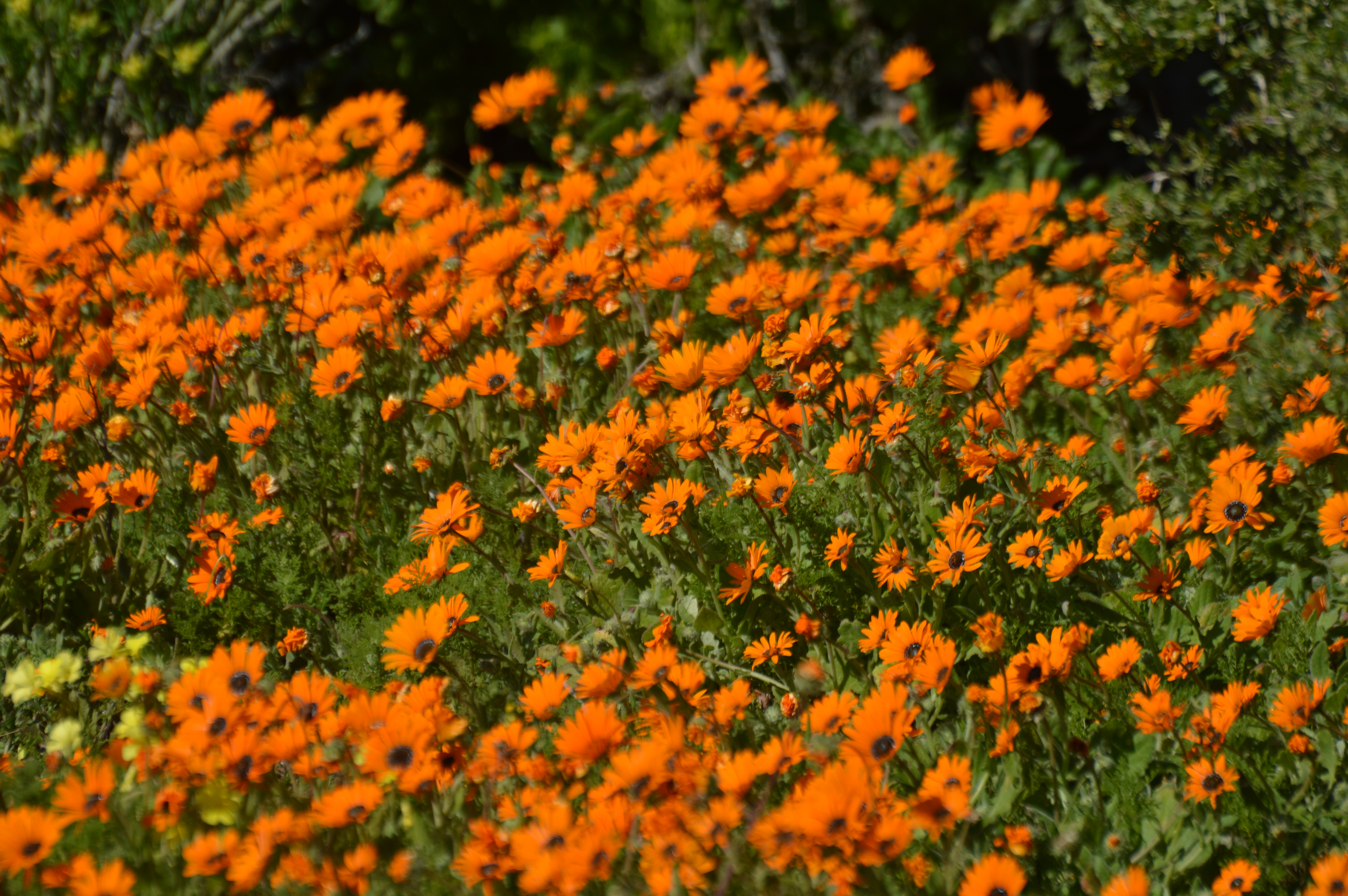
Garden variety flowering in a dense field during the spring season in West Coast National Park, Western Cape

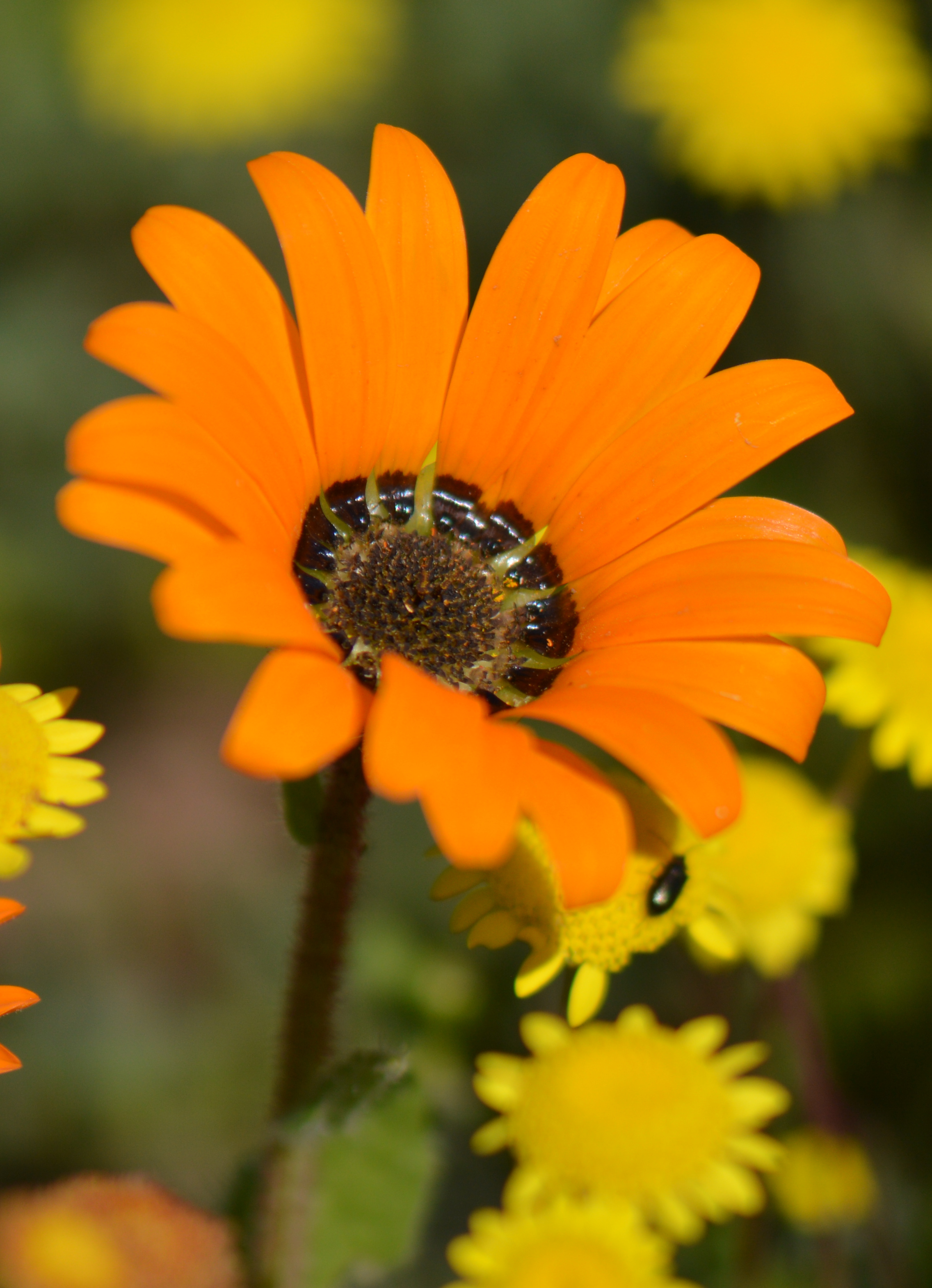
Flower close-up
