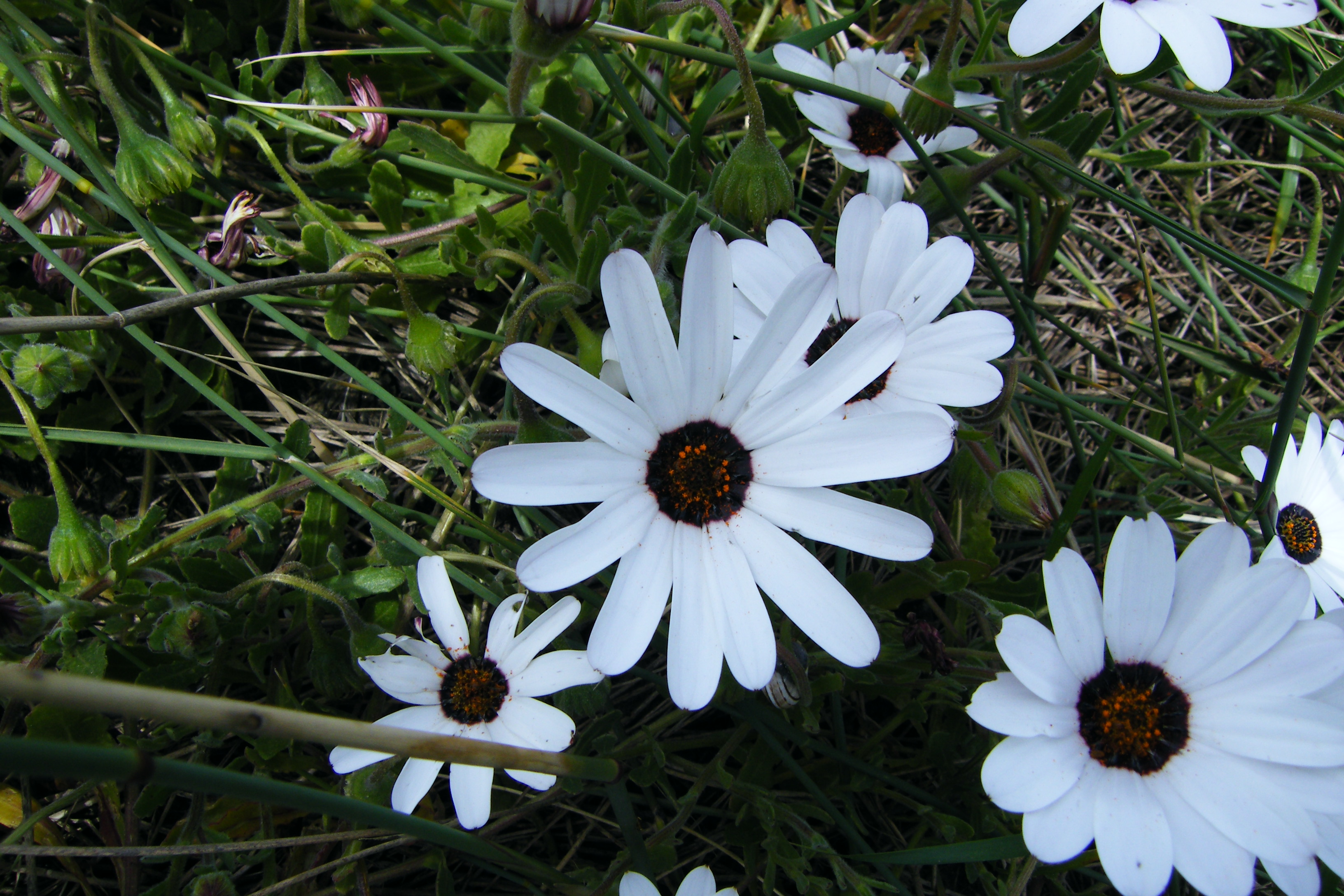
- Muizenberg beach in Cape Town

Scientific classification
- Kingdom: Plantae
- Clade: Tracheophytes
- Clade: Angiosperms
- Clade: Eudicots
- Clade: Asterids
- Order: Asterales
- Family: Asteraceae
- Genus: Dimorphotheca
- Species: D. pluvialis

Binomial name
- Dimorphotheca pluvialis (L.) Moench

Synonyms
- Calendula decurrens Thunb.; Calendula hybrida L.; Calendula pluvialis L; Calendula versicolor Salisb.; Dimorphotheca annua Less.; Dimorphotheca calendulacea var. dubia Phillips; Dimorphotheca hybrida (L.) DC.; Dimorphotheca incrassata Moench; Dimorphotheca leptocarpa DC.; Gattenhoffia pluvialis Druce

= Dimorphotheca pluvialis =

Species of flowering plant

Dimorphotheca pluvialis, common names white African daisy, Cape marigold, weather prophet, Cape rain-daisy, ox-eye daisy, Cape daisy or rain daisy, is a plant species native to South Africa and Namibia. It is sparingly naturalized in scattered locations in California.

Dimorphotheca pluvialis is an annual herb up to 40 cm (16 in) tall. It has long, narrow leaves, sometimes entire but sometimes toothed or pinnately lobed. Ray flowers are white to yellowish, sometimes with blue or purple markings. Disc flowers are usually white to yellowish with purple tips.
