= Grosvenor =

Grosvenor may refer to:

== People ==
- Grosvenor (surname), including a list of people with the surname Grosvenor
- Grosvenor Clarkson (1882–1937), American journalist and government official
- Grosvenor Francis (1873–1944), Australian politician
- Grosvenor Hodgkinson (1818–1881), English lawyer and politician

== Places, buildings and structures ==
- Grosvenor Park (disambiguation)
- Grosvenor Place (disambiguation)
- Grosvenor Hall (disambiguation)

=== London, England ===
- Grosvenor Bridge
- Grosvenor Canal
- Grosvenor Chapel
- Grosvenor Crescent
- Grosvenor Gallery
- Grosvenor House
- Grosvenor House Hotel
- Grosvenor School of Modern Art
- Grosvenor Square

=== In Chester, England ===
- Grosvenor Bridge (Chester)
- Grosvenor Museum
- Grosvenor Rowing Club
- Grosvenor Shopping Centre
- Chester Grosvenor and Spa

=== Elsewhere ===
- Grosvenor Arch, Utah, United States
- Grosvenor Centre, Northampton, England
- Grosvenor Chambers, Melbourne, Australia
- Grosvenor Grammar School, Belfast, Northern Ireland
- Grosvenor House (Dubai), United Arab Emirates
- Grosvenor Island, Nunavut, Canada
- Grosvenor Mountains, Antarctica
- Grosvenor Resort, Florida, United States
- Grosvenor Road, South Shields, England
- Grosvenor–Strathmore (WMATA station), Washington, D.C., United States
- Grosvenor Street, Sydney, Australia
- Port Grosvenor, South Africa
- Grosvenor, an electoral ward to Wrexham County Borough Council, Wales
- North Grosvenordale, Connecticut, United States

== Other ==
- Grosvenor (East Indiaman), wrecked 1782 on the South African coast
- The Wreck of the Grosvenor, 1877 novel by W. Clark Russell. No connection with the actual 1782 wreck of the Grosvenor (see above).
- Grosvenor Capital Management
- Grosvenor gambit or coup, a psychological play in the game of contract bridge
- Grosvenor Group
- Grosvenor Casinos
- Siraitia grosvenorii

== See also ==
- Grovenor, Edmonton, Alberta, Canada
