= List of islands of South Africa =

This is an attempt to list all islands of South Africa, regardless of whether they are located in oceans, rivers, lakes, or reservoirs.

== List of Islands of South Africa ==
Name	Province and location	Area in Ha	Coordinates	Description
Bird Island Group (3)	Eastern Cape near Port Elizabeth			now part of the Addo Elephant National Park
1. Bird Island	Eastern Cape near Port Elizabeth	19 hectares (47 acres)	33°50′S 26°17′E	now part of the Addo Elephant National Park
2. Stag Island	Eastern Cape near Port Elizabeth	0.1 hectares (0.25 acres)	33°49′S 26°16′E	now part of the Addo Elephant National Park
3. Seal Island	Eastern Cape near Port Elizabeth	0.6 hectares (1.5 acres)	33°50′S 26°16′E	now part of the Addo Elephant National Park
Bird Island, Lamberts Bay	Western Cape at Lamberts Bay	8 hectares (20 acres)	32°5′21″S 18°18′4″E	Breakwater walkway to main land
Dassen Island	Western Cape South of Saldanha Bay west of Yzerfontein	273 hectares (670 acres)	33°25′S 18°5′E	
Duiker Island	Western Cape near Hout Bay	0.4 hectares (0.99 acres)	34°3′S 18°19′E	
Dyer Island	Western Cape near Gans Bay	30 hectares (74 acres)	34°40′S 19°25′E	
Hartbeespoort Dam Islands	North West	1 hectare (2.5 acres)	25°45′S 27°53′E	
Kamfers Dam Artificial Island	Northern Cape North of Kimberley	0.3 hectares (0.74 acres)	28°40′S 24°45′E	located in the Kamfers Dam.
Kosi Bay Islands	KwaZulu-Natal in Kosi Bay	18 hectares (44 acres)	26°54′S 32°51′E	
Leisure Island	Western Cape, Knysna	49 hectares (120 acres)	34°3′S 23°3′E	
Thesens Island	Western Cape, Knysna	70 hectares (170 acres)	34°2′S 23°3′E	
Marion Island	Western Cape More than 1750 km southeast of Port Elizabeth	29,000 hectares (72,000 acres)	46°52′S 37°43′E	
Msikaba Island	Eastern Cape north of Port Grosvenor		31°19′S 29°58′E	
Prince Edward Island	Western Cape More than 1750 km southeast of Port Elizabeth	4,500 hectares (11,000 acres)	46°37′S 37°55′E	
Robben Island	Western Cape near Cape Town in Table Bay	507 hectares (1,250 acres)	33°48′S 18°22′E	The island where Nelson Mandela and others were imprisoned
Saint Croix Island Group (3)	Eastern Cape near Port Elizabeth			now part of the Addo Elephant National Park
1. Saint Croix Island	Eastern Cape near Port Elizabeth	12 hectares (30 acres)	33°47′S 25°46′E	now part of the Addo Elephant National Park
2. Brenton Island	Eastern Cape near Port Elizabeth	5 hectares (12 acres)	33°49′S 25°45′E	now part of the Addo Elephant National Park
3. Jahleel Island	Eastern Cape near Port Elizabeth	5 hectares (12 acres)	33°48′S 25°42′E	now part of the Addo Elephant National Park
Saint Lucia Lake Island	KwaZulu-Natal near St Lucia on Lake St. Lucia	197 hectares (490 acres)	27°57′S 32°29′E	
Schaapeneiland	Saldanha Bay near Langebaan		33°05′29″S 18°01′14″E	
Seal Island	near Simon's Town in False Bay	4 hectares (9.9 acres)	34°8′S 18°34′E	Occupied by Cape fur seals.
Seal Island (Mossel Bay)	near Mossel Bay		34°9′S 22°7′E	
Vaal Dam Island	Just inside the Gauteng border	110 hectares (270 acres)	26°52′S 28°10′E	
Vaaldegrace Island Group - Vaal River (3)	Free State at Parys	110 hectares (270 acres)		
1. Vaaldegrace Island 1	Free State at Parys		26°55′S 27°25′E	
2. Vaaldegrace Island 2	Free State at Parys		26°53′S 27°28′E	
3. Vaaldegrace Island 3	Free State at Parys		26°53′S 27°26′E	
Vondeling Island	Western Cape near Saldanha Bay	10 hectares (25 acres)	33°9′S 17°59′E	

== List of Islands in reservoires (or Dams) ==
(and islands in Estuaries) Most of these Islands are Unnamed

Name	Province and location	Area in Ha	Coördinates	description
Klipplaat Dam	Mpumalanga between Kriel and Witbank		26°11′23″S 29°12′43″E	Unnamed Island
Vaal Barrage	border Gauteng and Free State, between Vaal Dam and the Barrage		26°45′39″S 27°41′15″E	4 Unnamed Islands
Vaal Dam	Free State main section of the Dam has Groot Island	1.2 square kilometres (0.46 sq mi)	26°51′49″S 28°10′21″E	groot eiland
Vaal Dam	Mpumalanga Vaal River section of the Dam has 4 Islands		26°56′56″S 28°20′14″E	coordinates of largest given
Vaal Dam	Free State Wilge River section of the Dam has 2 Islands		27°5′25″S 28°18′46″E	coordinates of largest given
Kosi Estuary	KwaZulu-Natal at Kosi Bay, has 2 Islands		26°54′14″S 32°51′55″E	coordinates of largest given
Bloemhof Dam	Free State has 15 Islands in the Vaal River section of the Dam		27°40′0″S 26°0′28″E	coordinates of largest given
Bloemhof Dam	Free State has 4 Islands in the Vet River section of the Dam		27°48′2″S 25°46′24″E	coordinates of largest given
Ntshingwayo Chelsford Dam	KwaZulu-Natal south of Newcastle has 1 Island		28°0′41″S 29°51′17″E	
Allemanskraal Dam	Free State has 5 Islands		28°17′47″S 27°9′35″E	coordinates of largest given
Driel Barrage	KwaZulu-Natal near Bergville has 2 Islands		28°46′24″S 29°15′58″E	coordinates of largest given
Kalkfontein Dam	Free State near Koffiefontein has 2 Islands		29°27′37″S 25°13′58″E	coordinates of largest given
Dudley Pringle Dam	KwaZulu-Natal near Tongaat has 2 Islands		29°31′38″S 31°8′27″E	coordinates of largest given
Hazelmere Dam	Eastern Cape near Hazelmere, has 2 Islands		29°35′37″S 31°1′36″E	coordinates of largest given
Vanderkloof Dam	Free State has 10 Islands		30°4′43″S 24°49′55″E	coordinates of largest given
Gariep Dam	Free State has about 25 Islands		30°39′13″S 25°40′8″E	coordinates of largest given
Grassridge Dam	Eastern Cape has 1 Island		31°45′1″S 25°27′21″E	

== See also ==
- Estuaries in South Africa
- List of rivers of South Africa
- List of lakes in South Africa
- List of reservoirs and dams in South Africa
- Lagoons of South Africa
- List of Bays of South Africa
