= Byldrift =

- Location within Limpopo Location within South Africa
- Coordinates: 24°30′S 29°29′E
- Country: South Africa
- Province: Limpopo
- District: Capricorn
- Municipality: Lepele-Nkumpi

Area
  - Total: 3.60 km^{2} (1.39 sq mi)

Population (2011)
  - Total: 1,785
  - Density: 496/km^{2} (1,280/sq mi)

Racial makeup (2011)
  - Black African: 99.9%
  - Indian/Asian: 0.1%

First languages (2011)
  - Northern Sotho: 97.9%
  - Other: 2.1%
- Time zone: UTC+2 (SAST)

Byldrift is a village community 281 km northeast of Pretoria. Byldrift and Mmotwaneng Village are an extension and part of Malatane. Both these communities were founded by Seloane, the second son of King Matlebjane II of Batau. Matlebjane II had other sons: Masemola, Phaahla, Mogashoa and Photo. Masemola founded Masemola village, Phaahla founded Phaahla village, and Mogashoa founded Mogashoa village. The people in these villages belong to Batau tribe and consider themselves as one blood and are related through a deep long entrenched social history that is traced from Eswatini.

They broke away from Eswatini around the year 1540. From mainline Swazi, Batau settled at Wakkerstroom and then Seokodibeng around 1624, at a place that is now called Lake Chrissie. From Lake Chrissie (Seokodibeng) they went to Mokwena River (which today is called Crocodile River) settling there in the late 17th century. Here the Batau established themselves as a nation outside the mainline Swazi and subsequently broke away from all Swazi identity - they shed their Swazi outlook and adopted new ways and customs especially those of the Mapulane, Tswana people and Sotho people.

Compared to the surrounding communities of Makgophong, Mehlareng, Masemola, Malatane, Mamatonya and Marulaneng, Byldrift is the most warm hospitable and friendly community - people are proud of their heritage and rich African history.

The greatest need in the area is lack of political intervention - intellectual and entrepreneurial development of the people of Byldrift. There is hardly any industrial area - as a result a lot of the youth are spread all over Gauteng and only come back home during events and ceremonies such as funerals, weddings and holidays. Nevertheless the people of Byldrift are proud of their heritage and rich history as Batau and Limpopo even though they live in other areas mostly Gauteng and some even in the United States.

== Notable people ==
- Carol Mafagane, politician
- Ali Naka, software developer, US
- Dr Brian Naka, local doctor
- Nico Makgopa, programmer and software developer
- Clement Nchabeleng, researcher and author

== See also ==
- Batau tribe
