= List of estuaries of South Africa =

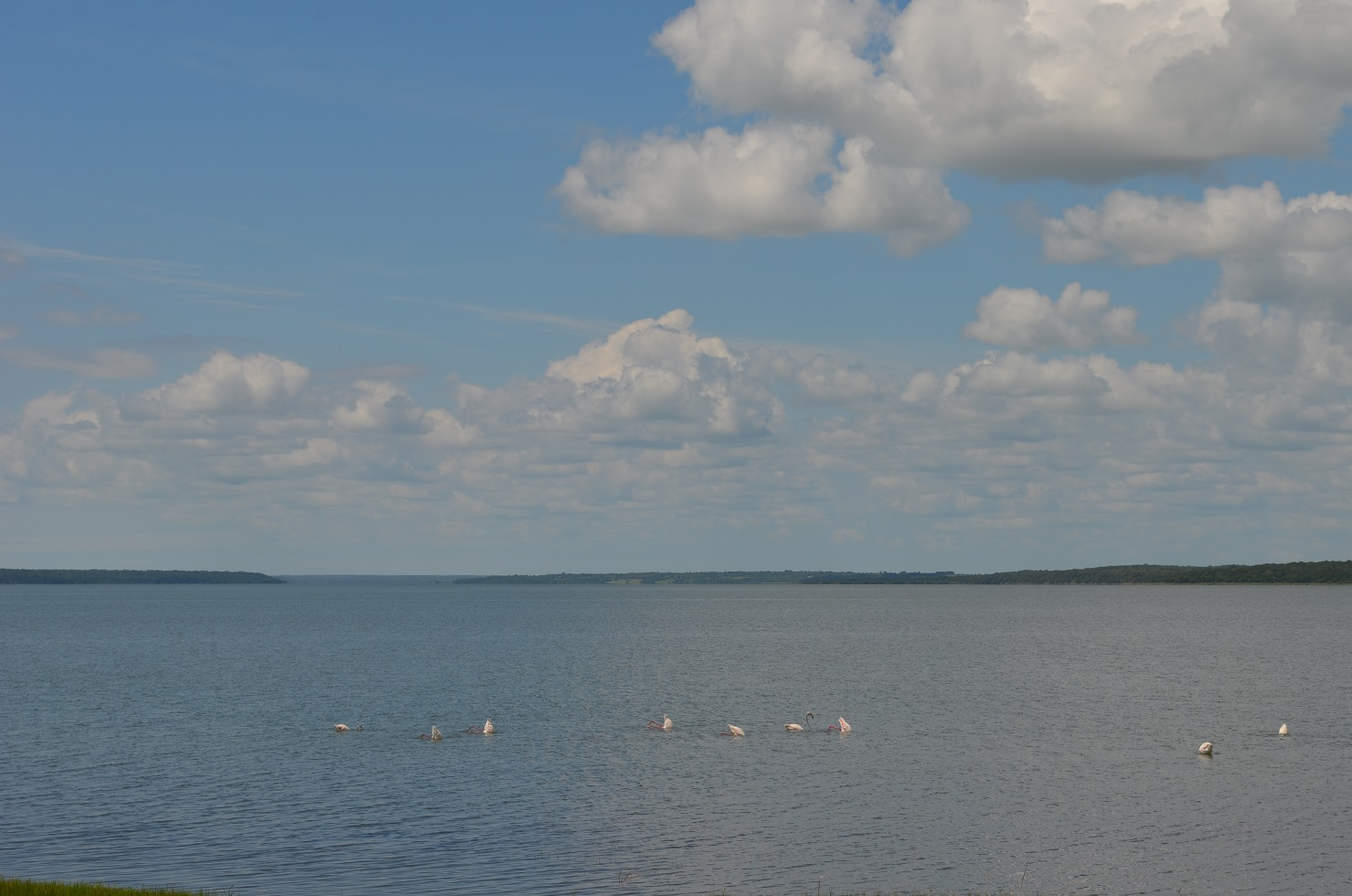
False Bay, Lake St Lucia

This is a list of estuaries in South Africa. The list is in order from East (border with Mozambique) to the West (border with Namibia).

The South African coastline stretches for some 3000 km from Kosi Bay near the Mozambique border in the east to the Gariep (Orange) River at the Namibian border in the west. Some 300 river outlets intersect this coastline and these range from small water bodies that are only occasionally connected to the ocean, to large, permanently open systems, and coastal lakes connected to the sea via a narrow channel (Heydorn, 1991). Being places where rivers meet the sea, estuaries are one of the most important features of the South African coastline; they are tranquil areas of high productivity and play a vital role in the life cycles of many plants and animals. Apart from their ecological importance, estuaries are also popular sites for human activity and development. Recreational uses of estuaries include bait collection, bird watching, boating, fishing and swimming. Because of their great aesthetic value, areas around estuaries are often favoured for housing and tourist developments.

== List of estuaries in South Africa ==
Name	Drainage area in Km²	Province and location	River Name	Coördinates	Summary / Remarks
Kosi Bay Estuary	304	KwaZulu-Natal, border Mozambique		26°54′S 32°52′E	Kosi Bay (26° 54' S; 32° 53’E) drains into the Indian Ocean, and is situated on the east (KwaZulu-Natal) coast near the Mozambique border. This system has a catchment area of approximately 304 km^{2}.
St Lucia Estuary	9542	KwaZulu-Natal, Richards Bay		28°23′S 32°25′E	The St Lucia estuary (28° 23' S; 32° 25’E) drains into the Indian Ocean, and is situated north of the coastal town of Richards Bay in KwaZulu-Natal. It is the largest estuarine system in the country and has a catchment area of approximately 9 542 km^{2}.
Mfolozi/Msunduzi Estuary	11068	KwaZulu-Natal, Richards Bay	Mfolozi River, and Msunduzi River	28°24′S 32°25′E	The Mfolozi/Msunduzi estuary (28° 24' S; 32° 25’E) drains into the Indian Ocean, and is located north of the coastal town of Richards Bay in KwaZulu-Natal. This system has a catchment area of approximately 11 068 km^{2}.
Richards Bay/Mhlathuze Estuary	3670	KwaZulu-Natal, Richards Bay	Mhlathuze River	28°51′S 32°03′E	The Richards Bay/Mhlathuze system (28° 51' S; 32° 03’E) is situated at the coastal town of Richards Bay in KwaZulu-Natal. Prior to the construction of a deep-water harbour in the 1970s, the system comprised a large shallow, expanse of water, fed primarily by the Mhlathuze River, with a catchment area of approximately 3670 km^{2}. The system today consists two separate components, a harbour (Richards Bay) and a sanctuary area (Mhlathuze estuary) into which the Mhlathuze River flows. The harbour and sanctuary are separated by a 4 km long causeway or berm and each has its own separate opening to the sea. Both drain into the Indian Ocean.
Mlalazi Estuary	492	KwazUlu-Natal, Richards Bay	Mlalazi River	28°57′S 31°49′E	The Mlalazi estuary (28° 57' S; 31° 49’E) drains into the Indian Ocean, and is located just south of Richards Bay in KwaZulu-Natal. The river is approximately 54 km long with a catchment area of 492 km^{2}.
Matigulu/Nyoni Estuary	900	KwazUlu-Natal, Richards Bay	Matigulu River and Nyoni River	29°05′S 31°38′E	The Matigulu/Nyoni system (29° 05' S; 31° 38’E) drains into the Indian Ocean, and is situated south of Richards Bay in KwaZulu-Natal. This system drains a catchment area of over 900 km^{2}.
Thukela (tugela) Estuary	29101	KwaZulu-Natal, between Richards Bay and Durban	Tugela River	29°13′S 31°30′E	The Thukela system (29° 13' S; 31° 30’E) drains into the Indian Ocean, and is situated in KwaZulu-Natal, approximately midway between Richards Bay and the coastal city of Durban. The Thukela is the largest river system in KwaZulu-Natal. The river is approximately 405 km long with a catchment area of 29 101 km^{2}.
Mvoti Estuary	2829	KwaZulu-Natal, north of Durban	Mvoti River	29°24′S 31°20′E	The Mvoti estuary (29° 24' S; 31° 20’E) drains into the Indian Ocean, and is situated north of the coastal city of Durban in KwaZulu-Natal. The river is approximately 197 km long with a catchment area of 2 829 km^{2}.
Mgeni Estuary	4432	KwaZulu-Natal, Durban	Mgeni River	29°48′S 31°02′E	The Mgeni estuary (29° 48' S; 31° 02’E) drains into the Indian Ocean, and is situated near the coastal city of Durban in KwaZulu-Natal. The river is approximately 232 km long with a catchment area of 4 432 km^{2}.
Durban Bay	264	KwaZulu-Natal, Durban		29°52′S 31°04′E	Durban Bay (29° 52' S; 31° 04’E) drains into the Indian Ocean, and is located in the coastal city of Durban in KwaZulu-Natal. This important industrial harbour has a catchment area of approximately 264 km^{2}.
Mkomazi Estuary	4310	KwaZulu-Natal, south of Durban	Mkomazi River	30°12′S 30°48′E	The Mkomazi estuary (30° 12' S; 30° 48’E) drains into the Indian Ocean, and lies south of the city of Durban in KwaZulu-Natal. The river is approximately 298 km long with a catchment area of 4 310 km^{2}.
Mzimkulu Estuary	6745	KwaZulu-Natal, Port Shepstone	Mzimkulu River	30°44′S 30°27′E	The Mzimkulu estuary (30° 44' S; 30° 27’E) drains into the Indian Ocean, and is situated near the coastal town of Port Shepstone in KwaZulu-Natal. The river is approximately 329 km long with a catchment area of 6 745 km^{2}.
Mtavuna Estuary	1553	KwaZulu-Natal, south of Port Edward	Mtamvuna River	31°04′S 30°12′E	The Mtamvuna estuary (31° 04' S; 30° 12’E) drains into the Indian Ocean, and is situated just south of the coastal town of Port Edward at the KwaZulu-Natal, Eastern Cape provincial border. The river is approximately 162 km long with a catchment area of 1 553 km^{2}.
Mzamba Estuary	505	Eastern Cape, south of Port Edward	Mzamba River	31°06′S 30°10′E	The Mzamba estuary (31° 06' S; 30° 10’E) drains into the Indian Ocean, and is situated on the former Transkei coast of the Eastern Cape, just south of Port Edward near the KwaZulu-Natal, Eastern Cape provincial border. This system drains a catchment area of approximately 505 km^{2}.
Mtentu Estuary	965	Eastern Cape, north of Port St Johns	Mtentu River	31°15′S 30°03′E	The Mtentu estuary (31° 15' S; 30° 03’E) drains into the Indian Ocean, and is situated north of the coastal town of Port St Johns on the former Transkei coast of the Eastern Cape. This system drains a catchment area of approximately 965 km^{2}.
Msikaba Estuary	1011	Eastern Cape, north of Port St Johns	Msikaba River	31°18′S 29°58′E	The Msikaba system (31° 18' S; 29° 58’E) drains into the Indian Ocean, and lies north of the coastal town of Port St Johns on the former Transkei coast of the Eastern Cape. This system drains a catchment area of approximately 1 011 km^{2}.
Mzintlava Estuary	280	Eastern Cape, north of Port St Johns	Mzintlava River	31°32′S 29°41′E	The Mzintlava estuary (31° 32' S; 29° 41’E) drains into the Indian Ocean, and is situated north of the coastal town of Port St Johns on the former Transkei coast of the Eastern Cape. This system drains a catchment area of approximately 280 km^{2}.
Mntafufu Estuary	178	Eastern Cape, north of Port St Johns	Mntafufu River	31°34′S 29°38′E	The Mntafufu estuary (31° 34' S; 29° 38’E) lies north of the coastal town of Port St Johns on the former Transkei coast of the Eastern Cape. This system drains a catchment area of approximately 178 km^{2}.
Mzimvubu Estuary	19853	Eastern Cape, Port St Johns	Mzimvubu River	31°38′S 29°33′E	The Mzimvubu estuary (31° 38' S; 29° 33’E) drains into the Indian Ocean, and is situated near the coastal town of Port St Johns on the former Transkei coast of the Eastern Cape. This system drains a catchment area of approximately 19 853 km^{2}.
Mngazi Estuary	561	Eastern Cape, south of Port St Johns	Mngazi River	31°41′S 29°27′E	The Mngazi estuary (31° 41' S; 29° 27’E) drains into the Indian Ocean, and lies just south of the coastal town of Port St Johns on the former Transkei coast of the Eastern Cape. This system drains a catchment area of approximately 561 km^{2}.
Mngazana Estuary	285	Eastern Cape, south of Port St Johns	Mngazana River	31°42′S 29°25′E	The Mngazana estuary (31° 42' S; 29° 25’E) drains into the Indian Ocean, and is situated south of the town of Port St Johns on the former Transkei coast of the Eastern Cape. This system drains a catchment area of approximately 285 km^{2}.
Mtakatye Estuary	493	Eastern Cape, south of Port St Johns	Mtakatye River	31°51′S 29°16′E	The Mtakatye estuary (31° 51' S; 29° 16’E) drains into the Indian Ocean, and lies south of the coastal town of Port St Johns on the former Transkei coast of the Eastern Cape. This system drains a catchment area of approximately 493 km^{2}.
Mdumbi Estuary	2338	Eastern Cape, south of Port St Johns	Mdumbi River	31°56′S 29°13′E	The Mdumbi estuary (31° 56' S; 29° 13’E) drains into the Indian Ocean, and is situated south of the coastal town of Port St Johns on the former Transkei coast of the Eastern Cape. This system drains a catchment area of approximately 2 338 km^{2}.
Mtata Estuary	2585	Eastern Cape, south of Port St Johns	Mtata River	31°57′S 29°10′E	The Mtata estuary (31° 57' S; 29° 10’E) drains into the Indian Ocean, and lies south of the coastal town of Port St Johns on the former Transkei coast of the Eastern Cape. This system drains a catchment area of approximately 2 585 km^{2}.
Xora Estuary	438	Eastern Cape, south of Port St Johns	Xora River	32°10′S 29°00′E	The Xora estuary (32° 10' S; 29° 00’E) drains into the Indian Ocean, and is situated south of the coastal town of Port St Johns on the former Transkei coast of the Eastern Cape. This system drains a catchment area of approximately 438 km^{2}.
Mbashe Estuary	6030	Eastern Cape, south of Port St Johns	Mbashe River	32°15′S 28°54′E	The Mbashe estuary (32° 15' S; 28° 54’E) drains into the Indian Ocean, and is situated south of the coastal town of Port St Johns on the former Transkei coast of the Eastern Cape. This system drains a catchment area of approximately 6 030 km^{2}.
Nqabara Estuary	578	Eastern Cape, south of Port St Johns	Nqabara River	32°20′S 28°47′E	The Nqabara estuary (32° 20' S; 28° 47’E) drains into the Indian Ocean, and lies south of the coastal town of Port St Johns on the former Transkei coast of the Eastern Cape. This system drains a catchment area of approximately 578 km^{2}.
Shixini Estuary	332	Eastern Cape, south of Port St Johns	Shixini River	32°24′S 28°43′E	The Shixini system (32° 24' S; 28° 43’E) drains into the Indian Ocean, and lies south of the coastal town of Port St Johns on the former Transkei coast of the Eastern Cape. This system drains a catchment area of approximately 332 km^{2}.
Qora Estuary	700	Eastern Cape, south of Port St Johns	Qora River	32°27′S 28°40′E	The Qora estuary (32° 27' S; 28° 40’E) drains into the Indian Ocean, and is situated south of the coastal town of Port St Johns on the former Transkei coast of the Eastern Cape. This system drains a catchment area of approximately 700 km^{2}.
Nggusi/Inxaxo Estuary	134	Eastern Cape, south of Port St Johns	Nggusi River and Inxaxo River	32°35′S 28°31′E	The Ngqusi/Inxaxo system (32° 35' S; 28° 31’E) drains into the Indian Ocean, and is situated south of the coastal town of Port St Johns on the former Transkei coast of the Eastern Cape. This system drains a total catchment area of approximately 134 km^{2}.
Kobonqaba Estuary	321	Eastern Cape, south of Port St Johns	Kobonqaba River	32°36′S 28°29′E	The Kobonqaba estuary (32° 36' S; 28° 29’E) drains into the Indian Ocean, and is situated on the former Transkei coast of the Eastern Cape, south of Port St Johns. This system drains a catchment area of approximately 321 km^{2}.
Great Kei Estuary	20566	Eastern Cape, north of East London	Great Kei River	32°41′S 28°23′E	The Great Kei estuary (32° 41' S; 28° 23’E) drains into the Indian Ocean, and is situated north of the coastal city of East London and forms the southern border of the former Transkei coast of the Eastern Cape. The river is approximately 520 km long with a catchment area of 20 566 km^{2}.
Kwelera Estuary	418	Eastern Cape, north of East London	Kwelera River	32°55′S 28°05′E	The Kwelera estuary (32° 55' S; 28° 05’E) drains into the Indian Ocean, and is situated north of the coastal city of East London in the Eastern Cape. The river is approximately 86 km long with a catchment area of 418 km^{2}.
Gqunube Estuary	665	Eastern Cape, north of East London	Gqunube River	32°56′S 28°02′E	The Gqunube estuary (32° 56' S; 28° 02’E) drains into the Indian Ocean, and lies just north of the coastal city of East London in the Eastern Cape. The river is approximately 109 km long with a catchment area of 665 km^{2}.
Nahoon Estuary	548	Eastern Cape, East London	Nahoon River	32°59′S 27°57′E	The Nahoon estuary (32° 59' S; 27° 57’E) drains into the Indian Ocean, and is situated near the coastal city of East London in the Eastern Cape. The river is approximately 77 km long with a catchment area of 584 km^{2}.
Buffalo Estuary	1279	Eastern Cape, East London	Buffalo River	33°02′S 27°55′E	The Buffalo estuary (33° 02' S; 27° 55’E) drains into the Indian Ocean, and is situated at the coastal city of East London in the Eastern Cape. The river is approximately 133 km long with a catchment area of 1 279 km^{2}.
Tyolomnqa Estuary	441	Eastern Cape, southwest of East London	Tyolomnqa River	33°14′S 27°35′E	The Tyolomnqa estuary (33° 14' S; 27° 35’E) drains into the Indian Ocean, and lies southwest of the coastal city of East London and forms the northern border of the former Ciskei coast of the Eastern Cape. The river is approximately 78 km long with a catchment area of 441 km^{2}.
Keiskamma Estuary	2745	Eastern Cape, between East London and Port Alfred	Keiskamma River	33°17′S 27°29′E	The Keiskamma estuary (33° 17' S; 27° 29’E) drains into the Indian Ocean, and is found on the former Ciskei coast of the Eastern Cape and is situated approximately midway between the City of East London in the north and the coastal town of Port Alfred in the south. The river is approximately 263 km long with a catchment area of 2 745 km^{2}.
Great Fish Estuary	30366	Eastern Cape, near Port Alfred	Great Fish River	33°30′S 27°08′E	The Great Fish estuary (33° 30' S; 27° 08’E) drains into the Indian Ocean, and is situated northeast of the coastal town of Port Alfred and forms the southern border of the former Ciskei coast of the Eastern Cape. The river is approximately 730 km long with a catchment area of 30 366 km^{2}.
Kowie Estuary	800	Eastern Cape, Port Alfred	Kowie River	33°36′S 26°54′E	The Kowie estuary (33° 36' S; 26° 54’E) drains into the Indian Ocean, and is located at the coastal town of Port Alfred in the Eastern Cape. The river is approximately 94 km long with a catchment area of 800 km^{2}.
Kariega Estuary	685	Eastern Cape, Port Alfred	Kariega River	33°41′S 26°44′E	The Kariega estuary (33° 41' S; 26° 44’E) drains into the Indian Ocean, and is situated southwest of the coastal town of Port Alfred in the Eastern Cape. The river is approximately 138 km long with a catchment area of 685 km^{2}.
Bushmans Estuary	2675	Eastern Cape, southwest of Port Alfred	Bushmans River	33°42′S 26°40′E	The Bushmans system (33° 42' S; 26° 40’E) drains into the Indian Ocean, and is situated southwest of the coastal town of Port Alfred in the Eastern Cape. The river is approximately 293 km long with a catchment area of 2 675 km^{2}.
Sundays Estuary	20990	Eastern Cape, northeast of Port Elizabeth	Sundays River	33°43′S 25°51′E	The Sundays estuary (33° 43' S; 25° 51’E) drains into the Indian Ocean, and is located northeast of the coastal city of Port Elizabeth in the Eastern Cape. The river is approximately 481 km long with a catchment area of 20 990 km^{2}.
Swartkops Estuary	1303	Eastern Cape, Port Elizabeth	Swartkops River	33°52′S 25°38′E	The Swartkops estuary (33° 52' S; 25° 38’E) drains into the Indian Ocean, and is situated near the coastal city of Port Elizabeth in the Eastern Cape. The river is approximately 134 km long with a catchment area of 1 303 km^{2}.
Gamtoos Estuary	34635	Eastern Cape, west of Port Elizabeth	Gamtoos River	33°58′S 25°04′E	The Gamtoos estuary (33° 58' S; 25° 04’E) drains into the Indian Ocean, and lies to the west of the coastal city of Port Elizabeth in the Eastern Cape. The river is approximately 645 km long with a catchment area of 34 635 km^{2}.
Kromme Estuary	1085	Eastern Cape, west of Port Elizabeth	Krom River	34°09′S 24°51′E	The Kromme estuary (34° 09' S; 24° 51’E) drains into the Indian Ocean, and lies to the west of the coastal city of Port Elizabeth in the Eastern Cape. The river is approximately 109 km long with a catchment area of 1 085 km^{2}.
Keurbooms Estuary	1080	Western Cape, near Plettenberg Bay	Keurbooms River	34°02′S 23°23′E	The Keurbooms system (34° 02' S; 23° 23’E) drains into the Indian Ocean, and is located in the Western Cape province near the coastal town of Plettenberg Bay. The river is approximately 85 km long with a catchment area of 1 080 km^{2}.
Knysna Estuary and Harbour	525	Western Cape, Knysna	Knysna River	34°05′S 23°04′E	The Knysna estuary (34° 05' S; 23° 04’E) drains into the Indian Ocean, and is situated near the coastal town of the Knysna in the Western Cape. The river is approximately 60 km long with a catchment area of 525 km^{2}.
Swartvlei Estuary	455	Western Cape, between Knysna and Mossel Bay	Sedgefield River	34°00′S 22°48′E	The Swartvlei system (34° 00' S; 22° 48’E) drains into the Indian Ocean, and is located on the Sedgefield River, approximately midway between the coastal towns of Knysna and Mossel Bay in the Western Cape. The river is approximately 38 km long with a catchment area of 455 km^{2}.
Gourits Estuary	45715	Western Cape, southwest of Mossel Bay	Goutitz River	34°21′S 22°33′E}	The Gourits estuary (34° 21' S; 22° 33’E) drains into the Indian Ocean, and lies southwest of the coastal town of Mossel Bay in the Western Cape. The river is approximately 416 km long with a catchment area of 45 715 km^{2}.
Goukou Estuary (kafferkuils)	1550	Western Cape, west of Mossel Bay	Goukou River	34°23′S 21°25′E	The Goukou system (34° 23' S; 21° 25’E) drains into the Indian Ocean, and lies west of the coastal town of Mossel Bay in the Western Cape. The river is approximately 67 km long with a catchment area of 1 550 km^{2}.
Duiwenhoks Estuary	1340	Western Cape, west of Mossel Bay	Duiwenhoks River	34°22′S 21°00′E	The Duiwenhoks estuary (34° 22' S; 21° 00’E) drains into the Indian Ocean, and is situated west of the coastal town of Mossel Bay in the Western Cape. The river is approximately 83 km long with a catchment area of 1 340 km^{2}.
Breë Estuary	12384	Western Cape, west of Mossel Bay	Bree River	34°24′S 20°51′E	The Breë estuary (34° 24' S; 20° 51’E) drains into the Indian Ocean, and lies west of the coastal town of Mossel Bay in the Western Cape, near Cape Infanta. The river is approximately 337 km long with a catchment area of 12 384 km^{2}.
Heuningnes Estuary	1400	Western Cape, Cape Agulhas	Heuningnes River	34°42′S 20°07′E	The Heuningnes system (34° 43' S; 20° 07’E) drains into the Indian Ocean, and is the southernmost estuary in South Africa, situated near Cape Agulhas. The catchment area that feeds this system is approximately 1 400 km^{2}.
Klein Estuary	906	Western Cape, near Hermanus	Klein River	34°25′S 19°18′E	The Klein estuary (34° 25' S; 19° 18’E) drains into the Atlantic Ocean, and is located near the coastal town of Hermanus in the Western Cape. The river is approximately 66 km long with a catchment area of 906 km^{2}.
Bot Estuary	920	Western Cape, northwest of Hermanus	Bot River	34°21′S 19°05′E	The Bot system (34° 21' S; 19° 05’E) drains into the Atlantic Ocean, and is situated just northwest of the coastal town of Hermanus in the Western Cape. The river is approximately 54 km long with a catchment area of 920 km^{2}.
Palmiet Estuary	535	Western Cape, west of Hermanus	Palmiet River	34°21′S 19°00′E}	The Palmiet estuary (34° 21' S; 19° 00’E) drains into the Atlantic Ocean, and is located west of the coastal town of Hermanus in the Western Cape. The river is approximately 73 km long with a catchment area of 535 km^{2}.
Diep Estuary	1495	Western Cape, near Cape Town	Diep River	33°53′S 18°28′E	The Diep estuary (33° 53' S; 18° 28’E) drains into the Atlantic Ocean, and is situated near the coastal city of Cape Town in the Western Cape. The river is approximately 87 km long with a catchment area of 1 495 km^{2}.
Berg Estuary	7715	Western Cape, north of Cape Town	Berg River	32°46′S 18°09′E	The Berg estuary (32° 46' S; 18° 09’E) drains into the Atlantic Ocean, and is located in the Western Cape and is found on the west coast, north of the coastal city of Cape Town, in fact north of Saldanha Bay. The river is approximately 294 km long with a catchment area of 7 715 km^{2}.
Verloren Estuary	1895	Western Cape, north of Cape Town	Verlorenvlei River	32°19′S 18°20′E	The Verlore system (32° 19' S; 18° 20’E) is located in the Western Cape and is found on the west coast, north of the coastal city of Cape Town, south of Lamberts Bay. The river is approximately 101 km long with a catchment area of 1 895 km^{2}.
Olifants Estuary	46220	Western Cape, north of Cape Town	Olifants River	31°42′S 18°11′E	The Olifants estuary (31° 42' S; 18° 11’E) is located in the Western Cape and is found on the west coast, north of the coastal city of Cape Town, north of Lamberts Bay. The river is approximately 285 km long with a catchment area of 46 220 km^{2}.
Orange Estuary (Gariep)	549,700	Northern Cape border Namibia north of Port Nolloth	Orange River	28°38′S 16°27′E	The Gariep (Orange) system (28° 38' S; 16° 27’E) is situated just north of the coastal town of Port Nolloth in the Northern Cape and forms the border between South Africa and Namibia. The Gariep (Orange) River is the largest in southern Africa and drains most of the western part of southern Africa including parts of Namibia and Lesotho. The river is approximately 2 173 km with a catchment area of about 549,700 km^{2}.

== See also ==
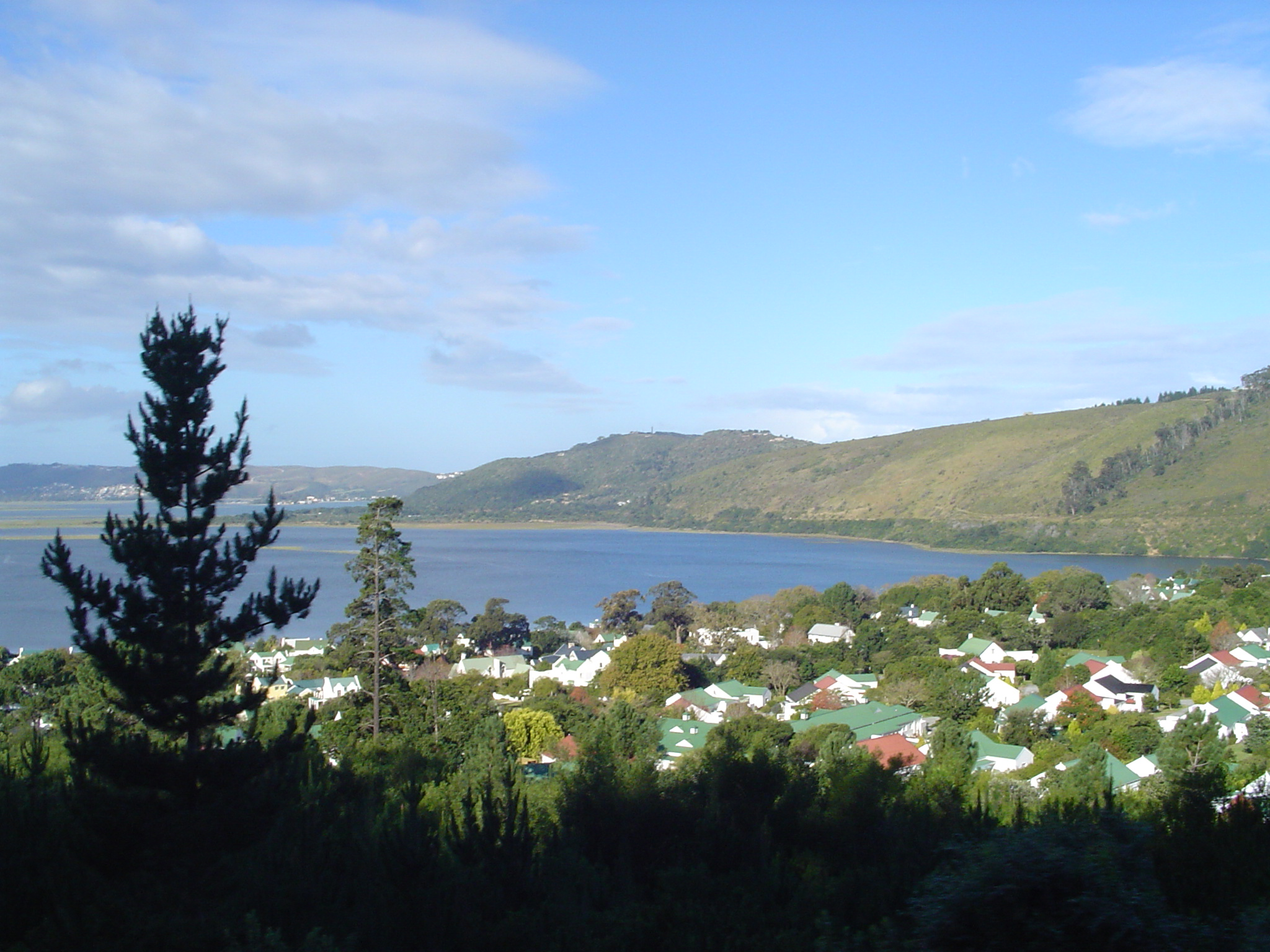
The Knysna Estuary

- List of Bays of South Africa
- List of rivers of South Africa
- List of reservoirs and dams in South Africa
- List of lakes in South Africa
- List of lagoons of South Africa
- List of Islands of South Africa
