= MV Ioannis NK =

History
- Name: Masashima Maru
- Port of registry: Japan
- Builder: Marugame Shipyard, Japan
- Launched: 15 June 1977
- Completed: 1977
- Out of service: 1991
- Identification: IMO number: 7700946
- Fate: Sold
- Name: Ioannis NK
- Owner: Agios Fanouris Shipping S.A.
- Operator: Seabound Maritime Inc.
- Port of registry: Panama
- Acquired: 1999
- Fate: Foundered 23 July 2009

General characteristics
- Type: Bulk carrier
- Length: 159.83 m (524 ft 5 in)
- Beam: 25 m (82 ft 0 in)

MV Ioannis MK was a bulk carrier built by the Marugame shipyard in Japan as the Masashima Maru in 1977 which sank on 23 July 2009 95 nautical miles (176 km; 109 mi) off Saldanha Bay, South Africa. The ship was carrying 22,500 tonnes of sugar on passage from Brazil to India. All of the crew were rescued by helicopter.
