= List of bays of South Africa =

The following is a partial list of bays of South Africa.

== List of Bays of South Africa ==
Name	Province	Nearest Town	Coordinates	Notes
Algoa Bay	Eastern Cape	Gqeberha	33°48′S 25°48′E	
Bakoven Bay	Western Cape	near Camps Bay	33°57′S 18°22′E	
Ballots Bay	Western Cape	near George	34°0′S 22°32′E	
Bantry Bay, Cape Town	Western Cape	in Cape Town	33°55.564′S 18°22.670′E	
Betty's Bay	Western Cape	Betty's Bay	34°21′S 18°54′E	
Blameys Bay	KwaZulu-Natal	south of Umkomaas	30°14′S 30°46′E	
Boulder Bay	Eastern Cape	south of Port St Johns	31°43′S 29°24′E	
Buffels Bay	Western Cape	near Knysna	34°4′S 22°59′E	
Buffels Bay, Cape Peninsula	Western Cape	near Cape Town	34°19.123′S 18°27.650′E	
Camps Bay	Western Cape	Camps Bay	33°56′S 18°22′E	
Chapman Bay	Western Cape	near Cape Town	34°6′S 18°20′E	
Clifton Bay	Western Cape	near Camps Bay		
Coffee Bay	Eastern Cape	Coffee Bay	31°58′S 29°9′E	
Cracker Bay	KwaZulu-Natal	near Umzumbe	30°38′S 30°31′E	
East Point Bay	Western Cape	near Pringle Bay	34°23′S 18°49′E	
Else Bay	Western Cape	near Cape Town	34°09.593′S 18°25.921′E	
False Bay (Valsbaai)	Western Cape	Simon's Town	34°13′S 18°38′E	
Fish Bay (Visbaai)	Western Cape	near Mossel Bay	34°16′S 21°56′E	
Fish Hoek Bay	Western Cape	near Cape Town	34.13745°S 18.43374°E	
Flesh Bay	Western Cape	near Mossel Bay	34°19′S 21°55′E	
Gordon's Bay	Western Cape	Gordon's Bay	34°9′S 18°50′E	
Granger Bay	Western Cape	Cape Town	33°54′S 18°25′E	
Herolds Bay	Western Cape	near George	34°3′S 22°23′E	
Hol Bay	Western Cape	near Betty's Bay	34°22′S 18°51′E	
Hout Bay	Western Cape	near Cape Town	34°3′S 18°21′E	
Hydra Bay	Western Cape	near Gans Bay	34°36′S 19°19′E	
John Richard's Bay	Western Cape	near Port Beaufort	34°28′S 20°51′E	
Kalk Bay	Western Cape	near Cape Town	34°07.698′S 18°26.986′E	
Kerries Bay	Western Cape	near Kleinmond	34°23′S 19°7′E	
Kosi Bay	KwaZulu-Natal	north of St Lucia	26°54′S 32°52′E	
Lambasi Bay	Eastern Cape	near Port Grosvenor	31°22′S 29°54′E	
Lambert's Bay	Western Cape	near Saldanha, Western Cape		
Leach Bay	Eastern Cape	East London	33°2′S 27°53′E	
Leisure Bay	KwaZulu-Natal	near Port Edward	31°2′S 30°14′E	
Leeugat Bay	Western Cape	near Cape Town		
Long Bay	Western Cape	Robben Island	33°48′S 18°21′E	
Mackerel Bay	Western Cape	near Cape Town	34°10.302′S 18°25.761′E	
Marcus Bay	Western Cape	near Arniston	34°38′S 20°15′E	
Mas Bay	Western Cape	near Pringle Bay	34°22′S 18°50′E	
Mazeppa Bay	Eastern Cape	Mazeppa Bay	32°28′S 28°39′E	
Mngazi Bay	Eastern Cape	south of Port St Johns	31°41′S 29°25′E	
Moonshine Bay	Western Cape	near Pringle Bay	34°22′S 18°49′E	
Morgan's Bay	Eastern Cape	Morgan's Bay	32°42′S 28°20′E	
Mossel Bay	Western Cape	Mossel Bay	34°6′S 22°9′E	
Murray's Bay	Western Cape	Robben Island	33°48′S 18°22′E	
Olifantsbos Bay	Western Cape	near Cape Town	34°15′S 18°22′E	
Piet Rogs Bay	Western Cape	near Port Beaufort	34°24′S 21°22′E	
Plettenberg Bay	Eastern Cape	Plettenberg Bay	34°2′S 23°24′E	
Pooles Bay	Western Cape	Hermanus	34°24′S 19°15′E	
Preslie's Bay	Eastern Cape		31°52′S 29°15′E	
Pringle Bay	Western Cape	Pringle Bay	34°20′S 18°49′E	
Queensberry Bay	Eastern Cape	north of East London	32°53′S 28°5′E	
Rooiels Bay	Western Cape	near Cape Town		
Rumbly Bay	Western Cape	near Cape Town		
Saint Francis Bay	Eastern Cape	Jeffreys Bay	34°2′S 24°59′E	
Saint Lucia Bay	KwaZulu-Natal	St Lucia	28°23′S 32°25′E	
Saint Mungo Bay	Western Cape	Cape Aghulas	34°49′S 20°1′E	
Saint Sebastian Bay	Western Cape	Port Beaufort	34°23′S 20°52′E	
Saldanha Bay	Western Cape	Saldanha Bay	33°2′S 17°58′E	
Salmon Bay (Kwazulu-Natal)	KwaZulu-Natal	near Stanger	29°24′S 31°18′E	
Salt Vlei Bay	Eastern Cape	Port Alfred	33°37′S 26°52′E	
Sand Bay	Western Cape	near Hermanus	34°25′S 19°12′E	
Sandown Bay	Western Cape	near Kleinmond	34°20′S 19°2′E	
Sandy Bay	Western Cape	near Hout Bay	34°1′S 18°19′E	
Santos Bay	Western Cape	Mossel Bay	34°9′S 22°7′E	
Schusters Bay	Western Cape	near Cape Town		
Shark Bay (KwaZulu-Natal)	KwaZulu-Natal	near Stanger	29°26′S 31°17′E	
Sharks Bay	Eastern Cape	Port Alfred	33°36′S 26°53′E	
Shuster's Bay	Western Cape	near Cape Town	34°11′S 18°21′E	
Simons Bay	Western Cape	Simon's Town	34°10′S 18°25′E	
Skoonberg Bay	Western Cape	near Cape Aghulas	34°45′S 20°4′E	
Skulpies Bay	Western Cape	near Cape Aghulas	34°48′S 20°3′E	
Smitswinkel Bay	Western Cape	near Cape Town		
Snake Bay (Slangbaai)	Western Cape	near Cape St Francis	34°10′S 24°37′E	
Sodwana Bay	KwaZulu-Natal	north of St Lucia	27°32′S 32°40′E	
Spark's Bay	Western Cape	south of Gordon's Bay	34°15′S 18°50′E	
Still Bay	Western Cape	Still Bay	34°22′S 21°25′E	
Strachan's Bay	Eastern Cape		31°50′S 29°16′E	
Struys Bay	Western Cape	near Cape Aghulas	34°43′S 20°6′E	
Table Bay	Western Cape	Cape Town	33°53′S 18°26′E	
Thompson's Bay	KwaZulu-Natal	near Ballito	29°31′S 31°13′E	
Three Anchor Bay	Western Cape	near Cape Town		
Umzinto Bay	KwaZulu-Natal	near Pennington	30°21′S 30°43′E	
Victoria Bay	Western Cape	near George	34°0′S 22°33′E	
Walker Bay	Western Cape	near Hermanus		
Walker's Bay	Western Cape	near Knysna	34°4′S 22°56′E	
Waterloo Bay	Eastern Cape	north of Port Alfred	33°28′S 27°9′E	
Witsand Bay	Western Cape	near Cape Town	34°10′S 18°20′E	

== See also ==
- List of estuaries of South Africa
- List of rivers of South Africa
- List of lakes of South Africa
- List of dams in South Africa
- List of lagoons of South Africa
- List of islands of South Africa
