= Nelson Diale =

South African politician

Nelson Diale OLS

Member of the National Assembly
- In office June 1999 – 6 May 2014
- Constituency: Limpopo

Personal details
- Born: 1 January 1936 GaMasemola, Transvaal; Union of South Africa
- Died: 8 January 2015 (aged 79) Sekhukhune, Limpopo
- Citizenship: South Africa
- Party: African National Congress

Letsau Nelson Diale (1 January 1936 – 8 January 2015) was a South African politician and anti-apartheid activist from Limpopo. He joined the African National Congress (ANC) in 1956 and served eight years' imprisonment on Robben Island, from 1964 to 1972, for his work with Umkhonto we Sizwe. After the end of apartheid, he represented the ANC in the National Council of Provinces from 1994 to 1999 and in the National Assembly from 1999 to 2014.

== Early life and career ==
He was born on 1 January 1936 at GaMasemola in Limpopo in the former Northern Transvaal. He did not complete his schooling but instead, in 1952, left the village to take up work as a waiter at a hotel in Pretoria. He joined the African National Congress (ANC) in 1956 and the Domestic Workers' Union, an affiliate of the South African Congress of Trade Unions, in 1958. The ANC was banned in 1960 by the apartheid government, but Diale covertly joined the party's new armed wing, Umkhonto we Sizwe (MK), and underwent military training. In January 1964, his unit was arrested; after being severely tortured, they were convicted of sabotage and imprisoned on Robben Island. Diale served eight years and was released in 1972.

After his release, Diale was subject to a banning order which, for the next four years, restricted his movements and political activities. He nonetheless continued to work underground for the ANC. In the mid-1970s, he was arrested again but on that occasion was acquitted and served with another banning order. In the 1980s, he helped Aaron Motsoaledi establish the Sekhukhune Advice Office, which provided logistical and financial advice to detained or injured activists and their families.

== Legislative career: 1994–2014 ==
In South Africa's first post-apartheid elections in 1994, Diale was elected to represent the ANC in the Senate (soon to become the National Council of Provinces), the upper house of the South African Parliament. In the next general election in 1999, he was elected to represent the new Limpopo constituency in the National Assembly, and he was re-elected to his seat in 2004 and 2009 before retiring in 2014.

== Honours and death ==
In April 2011, President Jacob Zuma awarded Diale the Order of Luthuli in Silver for "his excellent contribution to the struggle against apartheid and for his selfless sacrifices for the attainment of freedom for all in South Africa". He died on 8 January 2015 in Sekhukhune in Limpopo. Zuma granted him a special official funeral.
