= List of lakes of South Africa =

This is a list of lakes of South Africa. It includes lakes that were formed naturally, and a few wetlands. For artificial lakes such as reservoirs, refer to List of dams and reservoirs in South Africa. For estuaries (river mouths) see List of estuaries of South Africa, or if they are more the lagoon type List of lagoons of South Africa, and for bays see List of bays of South Africa.

| Name | Province | Nearest town | Coordinates | Notes |
|---|---|---|---|---|
| Lake Zilonde (Also KuZilonde or Silonde) | KwaZulu-Natal | Kosi Bay Area | 26°52′3″S 32°52′10″E | see Kosi Bay Lakes |
| Kosi Lake (by most regarded as a lake) | KwaZulu-Natal | Kosi Bay Area | 26°58′S 32°50′E | (actually an Estuary), see list of estuaries of South Africa, and Kosi Bay Lakes |
| Lake KuHlange | KwaZulu-Natal | Kosi Bay Area | 26°58′14″S 32°50′51″E | see Kosi Bay Lakes |
| aManzamnyama | KwaZulu-Natal | Kosi Bay Area | 27°1′36″S 32°49′32″E | see Kosi Bay Lakes |
| KuShengeza | KwaZulu-Natal | Kosi Bay Area | 27°1′47″S 32°46′55″E | see Kosi Bay Lakes |
| Lake Sibaya | KwaZulu-Natal | Kosi Bay Area, north of Sodwana Bay | 27°21′21″S 32°41′41″E | see Kosi Bay Lakes |
| Mgobezeleni Lake | KwaZulu-Natal | South of Kosi Bay, near Sodwana Bay | 27°31′S 32°39′E | see Kosi Bay Lakes |
| Makhawulani Lake | KwaZulu-Natal | Kosi Bay Area, near Sodwana Bay | 26°55′S 32°51′E | see Kosi Bay Lakes |
| Lake St. Lucia (by most regarded as a lake) | KwaZulu-Natal | north of St Lucia | 27°59′S 32°27′E | actually an Estuary, see List of estuaries of South Africa |
| Lake Nhlabane | KwaZulu-Natal | north of Richards Bay | 28°36′23″S 32°16′18″E | see Richard Bay's Lakes |
| Lake Msingazi | KwaZulu-Natal | north of Richards Bay | 28°45′43″S 32°5′49″E | see Richard Bay's Lakes |
| Richards Bay/Mhlathuze River Estuary | KwaZulu-Natal | Richards Bay | | the river part is an Estuary, see list of estuaries of South Africa. The Harbour is regarded to be just that, see Ports and harbours in South Africa |
| Lake Nsezi | KwaZulu-Natal | west of Richards Bay | 28°44′58″S 31°58′26″E | see Richard Bay's Lakes |
| Lake Cubhu | KwaZulu-Natal | south of Richards Bay | 28°50′19″S 31°58′0″E | see Richard Bay's Lakes |
| Ibundwe Pan | KwaZulu-Natal | north of Phongola | 26°59′S 32°18′E | see Phongola Lakes |
| Inyameti Pan | KwaZulu-Natal | north of Phongola | 26°53′S 32°18′E | see Phongola Lakes |
| Lake Hotwa | KwaZulu-Natal | north of Phongola | 26°52′S 32°17′E | see Phongola Lakes |
| Mandla Nkunzi Lake (Mantengane) | KwaZulu-Natal | north of Phongola | 26°58′S 32°17′E | see Phongola Lakes |
| Nhlole Lake | KwaZulu-Natal | north of Phongola | 27°1′S 32°18′E | see Phongola Lakes |
| Nlhanjwana Lake | KwaZulu-Natal | north of Phongola | 26°56′S 32°20′E | see Phongola Lakes |
| Tete Pan | KwaZulu-Natal | north of Phongola | 27°8′S 32°16′E | see Phongola Lakes |
| Msenyeni Pan | KwaZulu-Natal | north of Phongola | 27°13′S 32°12′E | see Phongola Lakes |
| Isivuguvungu Pan | KwaZulu-Natal | north of Phongola | 27°3′S 32°15′E | see Phongola Lakes |
| Maleni Pan | KwaZulu-Natal | north of Phongola | 27°8′S 32°14′E | see Phongola Lakes |
| Shalala Pan | KwaZulu-Natal | north of Phongola | 27°2′S 32°15′E | see Phongola Lakes |
| uMsunduze Pan | KwaZulu-Natal | north of Phongola | 26°56′S 32°13′E | see Phongola Lakes |
| Lake Chrissie (Chrissiesmeer) | Mpumalanga | near Chrissiesmeer | 26°20′3″S 30°12′57″E | |
| Lake Elands 1 | Mpumalanga | near Chrissiesmeer | 26°19′49″S 30°18′14″E | see Chrissiemeer Lakes |
| Lake Elands 2 | Mpumalanga | near Chrissiesmeer | 26°21′8″S 30°18′46″E | see Chrissiemeer Lakes |
| Magdalena's Lake | Mpumalanga | near Chrissiesmeer | 26°22′32″S 30°17′20″E | see Chrissiemeer Lakes |
| Lake Banagher | Mpumalanga | near Chrissiesmeer | 26°20′54″S 30°21′32″E | see Chrissiemeer Lakes |
| Lake Fundudzi | Limpopo | near Thohoyandou | 22°51′2″S 30°18′40″E | |
| Barberspan | North West | northeast of Delareyville | 26°33′20″S 25°36′6″E | see Delareyville Lakes |
| Leeupan | North West | northeast of Delareyville | 26°31′37″S 25°36′3″E | see Delareyville Lakes |
| Sout Pan | North West | south of Delareyville | 26°41′48″S 25°27′26″E | see Delareyville Lakes |
| Koppiesyn Pan | North West | south of Delareyville | 26°43′21″S 25°28′33″E | see Delareyville Lakes |
| Klein-Mond Wetlands | Western Cape | near Kleinmond | 34°20′S 19°2′E | |
| Onrus River Wetlands | Western Cape | near Hermanus | 34°24′S 19°10′E | is more a Lagoon, see List of lagoons of South Africa |
| Bot River Wetlands (Bot River Vlei) | Western Cape | near Hermanus | 34°20′S 19°6′E | is more an Estuary, see List of estuaries of South Africa |
| Klein River Vlei | Western Cape | near Hermanus | 34°24′S 19°20′E | is more an Estuary, see List of estuaries of South Africa |
| Sterkfontein | Gauteng | | | ^{[A]} |
| Knysna is a Lagoon | Western Cape | Knysna | | is more a Lagoon, see List of lagoons of South Africa |
| Groen Vlei | Western Cape | near Knysna | 34°1′39″S 22°50′46″E | |
| Sedgefield | Western Cape | Wilderness | | seems more like a lagoon (check?) |
| Rondevlei | Western Cape | Wilderness | 33°59′30″S 22°42′39″E | see Wilderness Lakes |
| Swartvlei | Western Cape | Wilderness | 33°59′43″S 22°45′33″E | see Wilderness Lakes |
| Upper Langvlei | Western Cape | Wilderness | 33°59′28″S 22°41′12″E | see Wilderness Lakes |
| Lower Langvlei | Western Cape | Wilderness | 33°59′45″S 22°38′37″E | see Wilderness Lakes |
| Goukou | Western Cape | at Stilbaai | | Is more an Estuary, see List of estuaries of South Africa |
| De Hoop Vlei | Western Cape | northeast of Cape Aghulas | 34°27′13″S 20°23′36″E | see Cape Aghulas Lakes |
| Heuningnes | Western Cape | north of Cape Aghulas | 34°42′31″S 19°58′51″E | see Cape Aghulas Lakes |
| Vogelvlei | Western Cape | north of Cape Aghulas | 34°40′0″S 19°52′44″E | see Cape Aghulas Lakes |
| Lake Applethwaite | Western Cape | east of Gordon's Bay | 34°11′45″S 18°59′16″E | |
| Lang Vlei | Western Cape | near Cape Town | 34°2′S 18°28′E | see Cape Town Lakes |
| Little Princess Vlei | Western Cape | near Cape Town | 34°2′S 18°28′E | see Cape Town Lakes |
| Sandvlei | Western Cape | near Cape Town | 34°5′S 18°28′E | see Cape Town Lakes |
| Sirkelsvlei | Western Cape | near Cape Town | 34°16′S 18°24′E | see Cape Town Lakes |
| Noordhoek Sout Pan | Western Cape | south of Cape Town | 34°7′S 18°22′E | see Cape Town Lakes ^{[B]} |
| Noordhoek Lagoon | Western Cape | south of Cape Town | | is more a Lagoon, see list of lagoons of South Africa |
| Kommetjie Lagoon | Western Cape | south of Cape Town | | is more a Lagoon, see list of lagoons of South Africa |
| Wildevoelvlei | Western Cape | south of Cape Town | 34°8′S 18°21′E | see Cape Town Lakes |
| Zeekoevlei | Western Cape | near Cape Town, northeast of Fish Hoek | 34°3′S 18°30′E | see Cape Town Lakes |
| Rondevlei | Western Cape | near Cape Town, northeast of Fish Hoek | 34°3′43″S 18°29′53″E | see Cape Town Lakes |
| Zandvlei | Western Cape | near Cape Town, northeast of Fish Hoek | 34°5′5″S 18°28′5″E | see Cape Town Lakes |

- A Subterranean lake
- B The name Sout Pan literally translates as Salt Pan, but the lake is not used to harvest salt.

== See also ==
- List of estuaries of South Africa
- List of rivers of South Africa
- List of dams and reservoirs in South Africa
- List of lagoons of South Africa
- List of bays of South Africa
- Ports and harbours in South Africa
