= Batau =

Batau may refer to:

- Lablab purpureus, a bean species
- Batau, Iran, a village in Razavi Khorasan Province, Iran
- Batau F.C., a South African football (soccer) club
- Batau tribe
