= Schaapeneiland =

Island in Saldanha Bay, South Africa

Schaapen Eiland
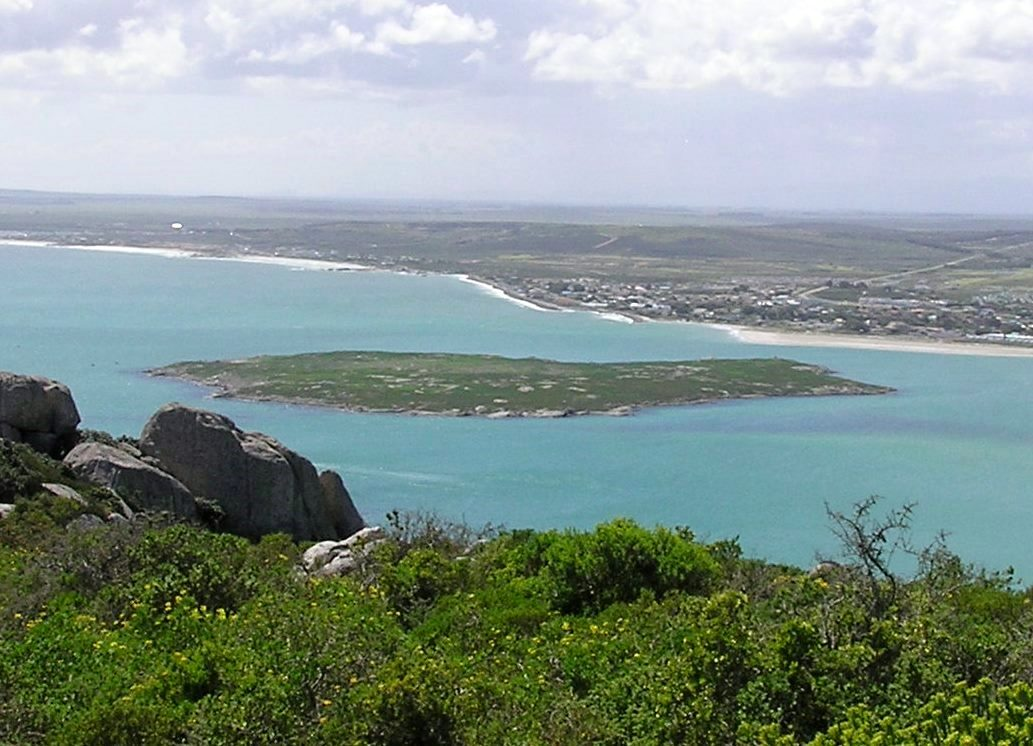
- Viewed from Postberg, with Langebaan beyond, Saldanha Bay to its left and the lagoon to the right
- Interactive map of Schaapen Eiland
- Other names: Isle à la Biche (French)

Geography
- Location: Saldanha Bay
- Coordinates: 33°05′27″S 18°01′16″E
- Area: 0.3 km^{2} (0.12 sq mi)
- Highest elevation: 15.8 m (51.8 ft)

Administration
- South Africa
- Province: Western Cape
- Municipality: Saldanha Bay

Demographics
- Population: 0

Schaapeneiland ("Sheep Island") is an island at the junction of Saldanha Bay and Langebaan Lagoon on the West Coast of South Africa.

== Protected area ==
The island of 267,500 sq m lies in the mouth of the Langebaan Lagoon, and is included in the West Coast National Park. It is protected by the Ramsar Convention. Since access to the island was banned, its vegetation and marine life have recovered well. It is now a bird sanctuary that is home to many ibis and a large breeding colony of kelp gull.

== History ==
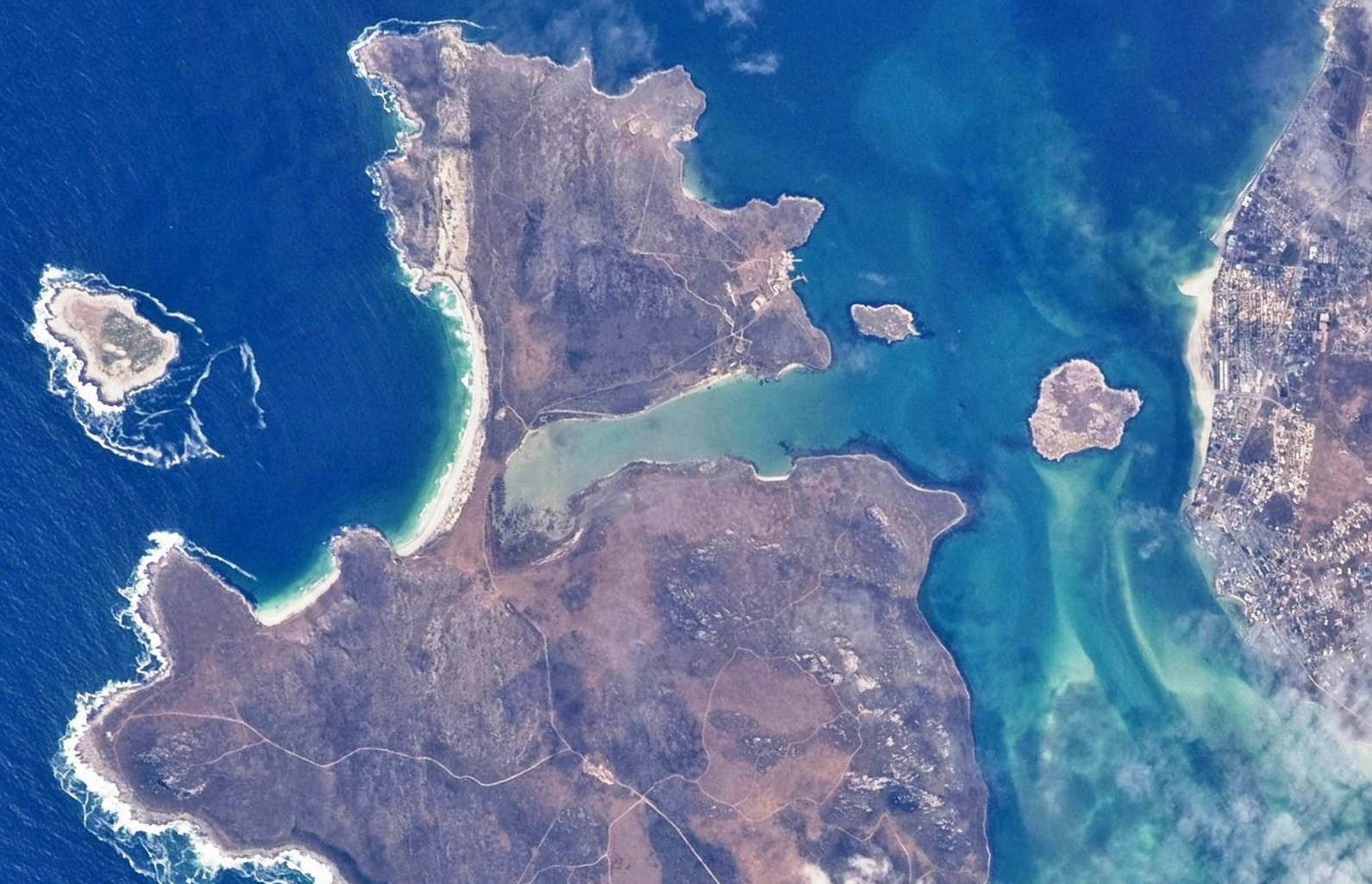
Aerial photo of the Langebaan area From left to right are Jutten Island, Langebaan Peninsula, Donkergat Bay, Meeuwen Island, Schaapeneiland and Langebaan town. Schaapen is the last island encountered as one enters the lagoon from the bay.

In 1612, the ship Pearl under Captain Samuel Castleton visited to ship drinking water. Eleven years later, Icelander Jon Olafsson and his ships Christianshaven and Flensburg visited the island and found barrels of whale oil. This indicated French visitors. Shortly after his settlement of the Cape, Jan van Riebeeck sent Sijmon Turver to the area. His company found neatly packaged sealskins and empty barrels here, once again suggesting French visitors. Turver started a sheep farm here. In 1655 and again in 1670 the French however returned to the island and slaughtered some the sheep. During the American War of Independence, a skirmish even took place on the island. Sheep Island has never been a good source of guano.

== Other islands ==
Malgas (Gannet), Meeuwen (Gulls), Marcus and Jutten Islands are all located in Saldanha Bay, while Vondeling (Foundling) is just outside the bay entrance.

== See also ==
- List of islands of South Africa

== Bibliography ==
- Burman, José and Stephen Levin: The Saldanha Bay story. Cape Town: Human & Rousseau, 1974. ISBN 0-7981-0456-2
- Groenewald, J.A .: Sheep... not just another West Coast island. Lantern, July 1985, volume 34, no. 3
