= Merestein =

Dutch East India Company merchant vessel

History

Dutch Republic
- Name: Merestein
- Owner: Dutch East India Company
- Operator: VOC, Amsterdam Chamber
- Port of registry: Amsterdam
- Route: Dutch Republic – Cape of Good Hope – Batavia
- Builder: VOC shipyard, Amsterdam
- Launched: 1693
- Completed: 1693
- Maiden voyage: January 1694
- Fate: Wrecked near Jutten Island, Saldanha Bay, 3 April 1702

General characteristics
- Type: Pinas (VOC East Indiaman)
- Tonnage: 826 tons
- Length: 145 Dutch feet
- Beam: 36 ft 8½ in
- Propulsion: Sail
- Crew: c. 200–250

Merestein (also spelled Meresteijn or Meerestein) was a Dutch East India Company (VOC) merchant vessel built in Amsterdam in 1693. The ship served on the route between the Dutch Republic and Asia before being wrecked on 3 April 1702 near Jutten Island at the entrance to Saldanha Bay on the west coast of present-day South Africa. The vessel was carrying a cargo of silver coins intended to finance VOC trade in Asia, much of which remained unrecovered for more than two centuries.

== Construction ==
Merestein was built in 1693 at the VOC shipyard in Amsterdam for the Chamber of Amsterdam. The vessel was classified as a pinas, a type of sailing ship used by the VOC for long-distance voyages between Europe and Asia.

She measured about 145 Dutch feet in length with a beam of 36 feet 8½ inches and had a carrying capacity of approximately 826 tons. Her crew normally numbered between 200 and 250 men.

The ship's name referred to the estate of Merestein near Heemskerk in North Holland.

== Service with the VOC ==
Merestein entered service in January 1694 when she sailed from Texel with a VOC fleet bound for Asia.

Her first voyage was commanded by skipper Willem de Vlamingh, later known for his exploration of the west coast of Australia.

Like most VOC vessels sailing to Asia, Merestein called at the Cape of Good Hope before continuing to Batavia (modern Jakarta). The Cape settlement served as an important refreshment station where ships could obtain fresh provisions and repair storm damage during the long voyage.

During the 1690s the ship made several voyages between Europe and Asia. VOC ships generally sailed in organised outward fleets and returned in convoys known as retourvloten.

== Wreck of 1702 ==
In October 1701 Merestein departed Texel on another voyage to Batavia under skipper Jan Subbing.

The ship carried a cargo of silver coins intended to finance the VOC's trading operations in Asia.

After about six months at sea the ship approached the west coast of southern Africa north of the Cape of Good Hope. On the evening of 3 April 1702 the vessel attempted to reach the anchorage at Saldanha Bay near Jutten Island.

Breakers were sighted ahead and the crew attempted to anchor, but the anchors dragged in the heavy surf. The ship was driven onto rocks and broke apart in the breakers.

Around 99 survivors managed to reach land, but many officers and crew—including the skipper—were lost.

Governor Willem Adriaan van der Stel ordered a salvage expedition shortly after news of the disaster reached Cape Town, but the ship's cargo of silver coins could not be recovered because the wreck lay in deep water close to rocks and heavy surf.

== Early salvage attempts ==
Attempts to recover the lost silver continued during the eighteenth century. In 1728 the English diver and inventor John Lethbridge was sent by the VOC to investigate the wreck site.

Lethbridge used an early diving apparatus consisting of a sealed wooden barrel fitted with viewing ports and arm openings, allowing the diver to work on the seabed for short periods.

Because of the violent surf near Jutten Island, the expedition failed to recover the silver cargo.

== Rediscovery of the wreck ==
The wreck site remained largely undisturbed for more than two centuries. Coins occasionally washed ashore and were reportedly found by guano workers and lighthouse staff on Jutten Island.

In 1971 a Cape Town diving team led by Trevor (Bobby) Hayward located the wreck and began recovering coins embedded in seabed concretions.

Subsequent salvage operations by several groups of divers recovered large numbers of silver coins and artefacts from the site. Estimates suggest that around 15,000 coins have been recovered.

Artefacts recovered from the wreck include coins, weapons and personal objects such as musket balls and a leather shoe, some of which are now held in museum collections including the Rijksmuseum.

== See also ==
- Dutch East India Company
- Shipwrecks of South Africa
- Saldanha Bay
