= Ga Masemola =

Ga Masemola Ga Mokwena
- Location within Limpopo Location within South Africa
- Coordinates: 24.552°S 29.633°E
- Country: South Africa
- Province: Limpopo
- District: Sekhukhune
- Municipality: Makhuduthamaga
- Established: 1200s

Government
  - Councillor: kgoshi Mokwena

Area
  - Total: 1.45 km^{2} (0.56 sq mi)

Population (2011)
  - Total: 115,457
  - Density: 79,600/km^{2} (206,000/sq mi)

Racial makeup (2011)
  - Black African: 99.9%
  - Other: 0.1%

First languages (2011)
  - Northern Sotho: 98.6%
  - Other: 1.4%
- Time zone: UTC+2 (SAST)

Ga Masemola is a village community about 180 km North East of Pretoria/Tshwane. The area was founded in the 12th century by King Mokwena II the first born son of King Matlebjane II of Batau.

The Batau clan trace their origin from the Swazi.They moved north to Lake Chrissie (known in the local language as Seoko-seokodibeng) from Wakkerstroom. They went from there to Mokwena River (which today is called Crocodile River) and established themselves in the Mpumalanga Mountains. The area was initially called Ga Mokwena since the late 1200s till the time the settlers colluded with Masemola to overthrow King Mokwena. King Mokwena was the first born son of Paramount King (kgoshi kgolo ) Matlebjàne II. Masemola is the 5th son to King Matlebjane II. The elder brother to the currently monarch is king Mokoena in Mpumalannga those ruling in Ga Màsemothe àre the descendants of Mokoenyana. Both Mokoena and Mokoenyana àre the descendants of Masemola the younger brother to Kgoshi Mokwena. Kgoshi Mokwena was named after king Mokwena who was the father to king Matlebjane II.

== History ==
=== Settlers ===
In the 1880s emigration to South Africa was strongly encouraged by president Paul Kruger and support committees were set up throughout the Netherlands. In 1883 a company, under the leadership of Wolterus Dull, was established to strengthen ties between the Netherlands and South Africa. The first settlers from the Netherlands arrived during the period 1884-1887 let by Wolterus Dull. The area was proclaimed as a town in 1893 by Paul Kruger and was originally named Dull's-stroom, later simplified to Dullstroom, after the settlers’ leader Wolterus Dull and the Crocodile River (stream) nearby.

=== Founding ===
Matlebjane II had six. The first son was Mokwena, second Seloane, third Mogashoa, fourth Phaahla, the fifth Masemola and lastly Photo.

Seloane, Mogashoa, Phaahla and Masemola, got worried that the king's gifts (dibego) were continuously being taken to the younger king's wife (the mother to Photo). They then all agreed to murder the king, but were worried about what people will say. So they conceived a plan, since Photo was still a teenager, they somehow convinced him that all of them including him Photo should kill the king at night with their spears. But there was a plan Seloane, Mogashoa, Phaahla and Masemola cooked up which Photo was not privy to.

During that night the brothers got into the king's resting place and all stabbed the king; the king died. In the morning Photo discovered that he had been fooled by his brothers—his brothers' spears were turned deliberately at the sharp tip and he alone had killed the king. So only his spear had blood while his brother's spears did not have blood as the spears were deliberately blunted. Photo's brothers then cried aloud hysterically with painful voices, that Photo has killed their father. From then on Photo was despised and rejected by the people for having killed his father. The killing of Matlebjane II by his sons is the reason we have the following idioms today:

- Matlebjane o bolaile ke tswala.
- Ka hlagolela leokane la re go gola la ntlhaba?

The Batau lived at the Mokwena River for a period spanning 200 years. This was a time of relative peace and stability. Some people believe that their ruins and remains are still visible there in Mokwena (Crocodile) River, Dullstroom.

Ga Masemola surrounds ga Maphutha village. Maphutha (from the Swazi name Mabuza), was a brother to Masemola. The history of Batau was distorted and is still distorted. There is a need for historians through the right sources to rewrite the history of Batau. Originally when king MatlebjaneII was murdered, His first born son ( Mokwena) did not participate in the plot to assassinate King Matlebjane II. Only the younger brothers to Mokwena II participated in the assassination of the GreatKhalanga, Nguni and Batau King Matlebjane II. I want to rectify the fact that Matlebjàne had six sons and the fact that Mokwena is the eldest. When the ones ruling in Ga Masemola arrived in the Northern Transvaal, they were not kings but were made chiefs by King Mokwena as a token that they are sons of his younger brother, Masemola. They were under direct authority of king Mokwena together with Nkotsana, the father of Ga Nchabeleng.

== See also ==
Batau tribe
