= Batau clan =

The Batau clan were a Sotho-Tswana speaking group that lived in Swaziland moved to Lake Chrissie area from Wakkerstroom. After few centuries of staying in Wakkerstroom they were forced to move due to colonialism and upheavals of the Mfecane, they then settled in the area now known as Sekhukhuneland in Limpopo Province. Their totem animal is the lion.

== Demographics ==
Batau people include Batau Ba Masemola, Batau ba Malata a manyane/Mawela, Batau ba Manganeng, Batau ba Marishane, Phaahla, Kgaphola/Diphofa (Nkambule), Mogashoa (Mkhatshwa), Nchabeleng, Maroteng, Mohlaletsi, Malatane, Byldrift, and Mmotwaneng.

== History ==
These communities share history, once united under Kgoshi Ngwato, in the 14th and 15th centuries. During this time they lived along the Crocodile River in Mpumalanga.

From the Crocodile River, the clan migrated to the Transvaal and to what is modernly known as Pretoria. At the time, they were under the leadership of Matlebo. Eventually they migrated further north to Sekhukhune, where they were led by Matlebjane. According to records established by Mamagase Macheng Makgaleng, and later considered by Chris Kanyane, King Matlebjane was the younger brother of Matlebo. Matlebo died without having an heir, leaving Matlebjane next in the line of succession.

Matlebjane ruled Batau for a long time and was accepted by the Batau people.

Matlebjane had six sons: Mokwena, Seloane, Mogashoa (his sister's son), Masemola, Phaahla and Photo, each born by a different wife. As Matlebjane aged, he preferred to spend his time with beautiful, younger wives. All the rewards were taken to the younger wife and all the kingly honours were enjoyed with her. Photo was the son of this wife. In time the other sons of Matlebjane became worried that their father would give the kingship to Photo, due to the King's preference for his mother. This created tension within the family. Three of the sons: Seloane, Masemola, and Phaahla, along with Mogashoa, began to plan a way to kill their father. Knowing that if they were revealed to have killed him, a major political uprising would surely result in their death, the four planned to have Photo be the one to kill the Matlebjane.

Because Photo was still a young teenager, his brothers found it easy to influence him in join their scheme. They told Photo that the plan was that they would all visit Matlebjane in his sleep and collectively stab him to death with their spears. In reality, all the sons (excluding Photo) had their spears bent at the tip end. So, once they executed their plan and stabbed Matlebjane in his sleep, Photo's spear was the only one that actually stabbed the King. This meant, technically, Photo was Matlebjane's sole killer.

Despite the plan, the community uncovered the entire plot, including Photo's victimization. After the King's death, the community of Batau was divided for each son, and the groups scattered.

Other Batau people travelled further north and are now found in various communities across Limpopo Province.

== See also ==
- Masemola traditional village community, Ga Masemola
- Byldrift Malatane Ga Seloane traditional village communities
- Malata a Manyane
