= Carol Mafagane =

South African politician

Member of the National Assembly of South Africa
- Incumbent
- Assumed office 14 June 2024

Personal details
- Party: MK party
- Other political affiliations: EFF (previously)

Mokgaetji Carol Mafagane is a South African politician and a member of parliament (MP) for the UMkhonto weSizwe (MK).

She was first elected in the 2024 South African general election. She was previously a member of the Economic Freedom Fighters (EFF).

She comes from the village of Byldrift.

== See also ==
- List of National Assembly members of the 28th Parliament of South Africa
