= Grosvenor Hall =

Grosvenor Hall may refer to:

- Grosvenor Hall (estate), an estate in Kent, England, formerly occupied by the Ashford Police Training Centre
- Gilbert H. Grosvenor Hall, a building in Nova Scotia, Canada
- Grosvenor Hall, a building on the campus of Ohio University

== See also ==
- Grosvenor House
