= Wyndham Lake Buena Vista =

Hotel at Walt Disney World

Coordinates: 28°22′30″N 81°30′43″W

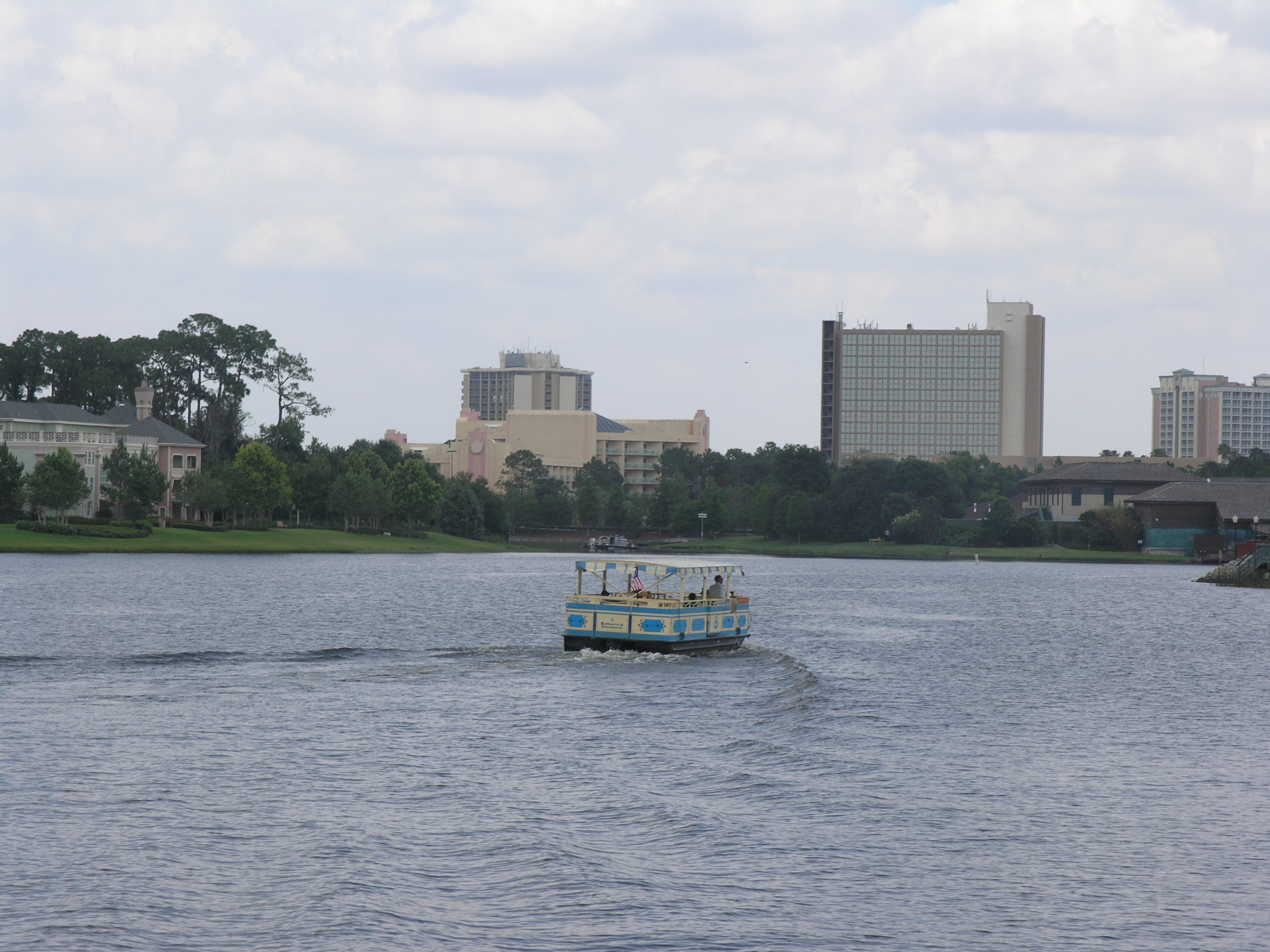
- Wyndham Lake Buena Vista (middle of the three hotel towers)
- Interactive map of the Wyndham Lake Buena Vista area
- Hotel chain: Wyndham Hotels and Resorts

General information
- Location: Walt Disney World, 1850 Hotel Plaza Boulevard; Lake Buena Vista, Florida; United States

Other information
- Number of rooms: 394

Website
- wyndhamlakebuenavista.com

Wyndham Lake Buena Vista Disney Springs Resort Area is a 394-room resort situated on the property of Walt Disney World Resort in Lake Buena Vista, Florida. It is located at 1850 Hotel Plaza Blvd., across from the Disney Springs area.

== History ==
The hotel opened on October 15, 1972, as the Dutch Inn, the 4th hotel to open on Walt Disney World property, located on Hotel Plaza Boulevard. It was later sold to Fort Worth-based Americana Hotels and rebranded as Americana's Dutch Resort Hotel, later slightly modified to the Americana Dutch Resort Hotel. Americana Hotels sold the resort to Grosvenor Properties in August 1986 for $33 million, and the hotel became the Grosvenor Resort. In 1988, following an $8 million renovation, the hotel joined Best Western Hotels and briefly operated as the Best Western Grosvenor, before becoming the Grosvenor Resort again. On September 1, 2007, the Grosvenor Resort was renamed the Regal Sun Resort as part of a $25 million renovation. The hotel joined Wyndham Hotels and Resorts on November 9, 2010, and became the Wyndham Lake Buena Vista. The two low-rise wings of the hotel are operated as a budget hotel, the Wyndham Garden Lake Buena Vista Disney Springs Resort Area, which shares facilities with the main hotel.

== Design ==
The hotel has 19,000 square feet (1,800 m^{2}) of meeting space and features a fitness center two swimming pools, a hot tub, and an aquatic playground for kids. There is also a basketball & volleyball court.
