= Grosvenor Park =

Grosvenor Park may refer to

- Grosvenor Park, Saskatoon, a neighborhood located in east-central Saskatoon, Saskatchewan, Canada
- Grosvenor Park, Belfast, a football ground in Northern Ireland
- Grosvenor Park, Chester, a park in Chester, Cheshire
- Grosvenor Park, a neighborhood located in North Bethesda, Maryland
- Grosvenor Park Productions, a British-American production and film-financing company
