= Wreck of the Grosvenor =

1784 shipwreck near South Africa

Coordinates: 31°22′26″S 29°54′53″E

- Cause: Ran aground
- Date: 4 August 1782; 244 years ago
- Location: Pondoland coast of South Africa

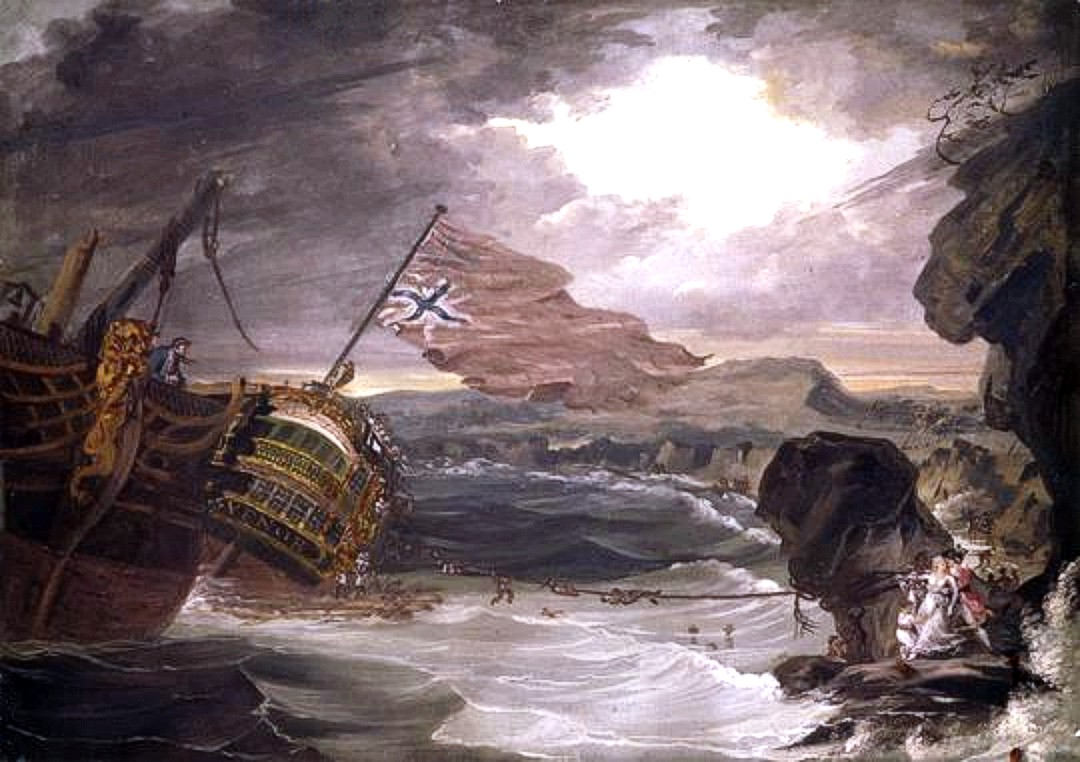
Oil painting of the Grosvenor by George Carter

The wreck of the Grosvenor, an East Indiaman, occurred on 4 August 1782 on the Pondoland coast of South Africa, north of the Umzimvubu River. The shipwreck was close to the place where the Portuguese ship São João had gone down more than two centuries earlier on 8 June 1552. The Grosvenor was a three-masted ship of 729 tons on her return voyage to England when she was wrecked, carrying a crew of 132 and 18 passengers (12 adults and 6 children), and a cargo valued at £75,000. Of the 123 survivors, only 18 reached Cape Town and were repatriated, the remainder dying of their privations or joining with tribes. Four survivors, Robert Price, Thomas Lewis, John Warmington, and Barney Larey, eventually got back to England.

== History ==
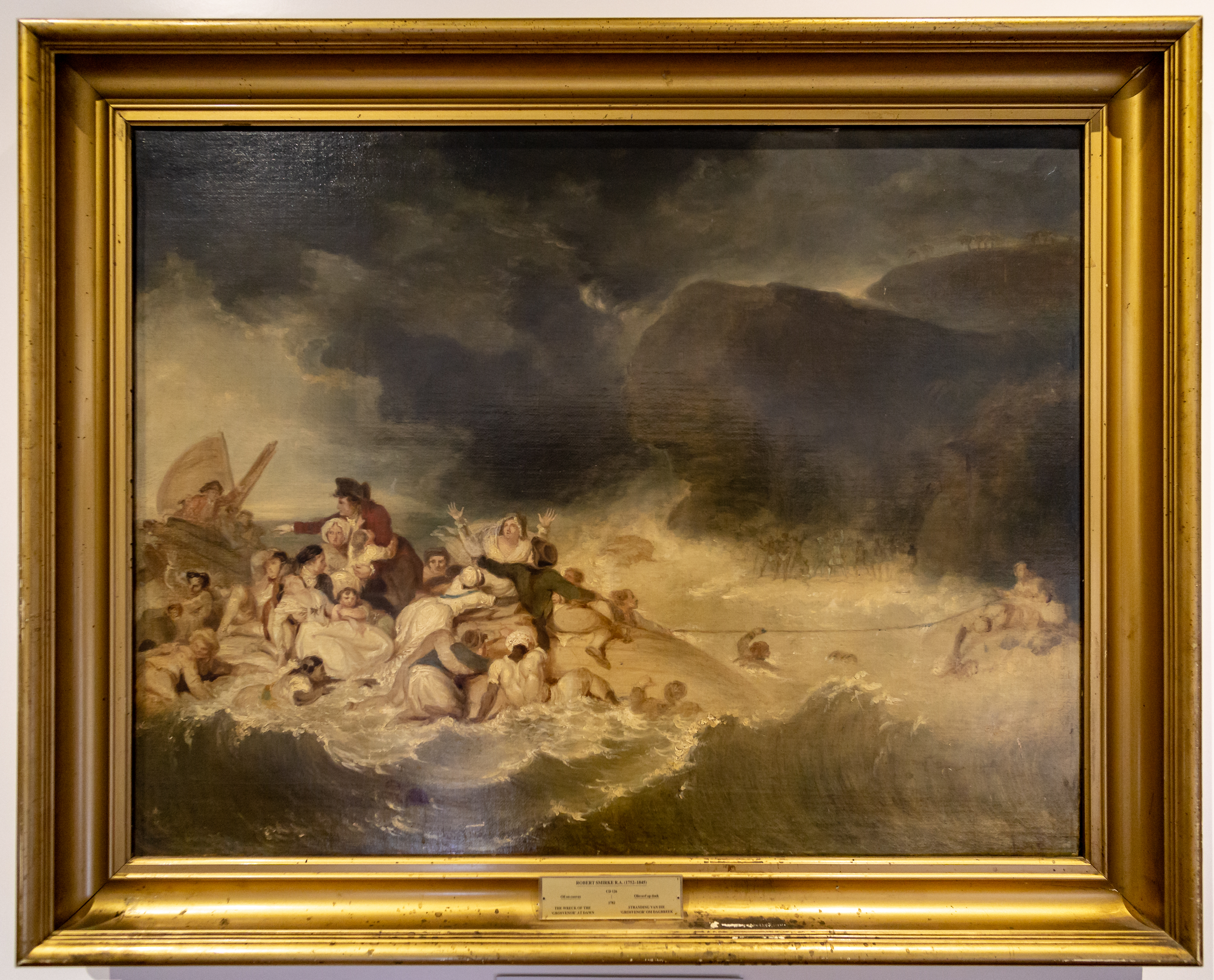
The wreck of the 'Grosvenor' by Robert Smirke

The Grosvenor had left Madras in March 1782 under the command of Captain John Coxon, falling in with Admiral Hughes' fleet. On 13 June 1782, she set sail for England from Trincomalee in Ceylon.

Sailing west near the Cape coast at 1 am and while adjusting the sails to ride out a gale, the crew noticed lights to the west, but dismissed them as something akin to the northern lights. When the lights presently disappeared, they were given no further thought. As it turned out, the lights were grassfires burning on a headland directly on their course, and their disappearance was due to their being hidden by the brow of the hill. At 4 am, Thomas Lewis reported that he thought he could see land, but the idea was rejected by the commanding officer of the watch, Thomas Beale, as everyone on board was certain that they were at least 200 miles (320 km) out to sea. The quartermaster Mixon, after some hesitation, alerted the captain, who instantly came on deck. He attempted to club haul the ship, but this failed, and the vessel ran aground on the rocks. In the darkness, the crew firmly believed that as they were a long way from land, they had struck an uncharted island or reef. With a change in the wind direction, the captain felt that they could refloat the Grosvenor and run her aground in some more convenient place. A fortuitous change in the wind allowed the stern section of the ship, where most of the passengers were trapped, to be hauled into a sheltered inlet. Seventeen of the passengers and ninety-one of the crew survived the initial disaster.

Captain Coxon, together with the Second Mate, William Shaw, and Third Mate, Thomas Beale, mustered the passengers and crew on the shore, retrieving what supplies they could from the wreckage of the ship (the First Mate, Alexander Logie, was suffering from dysentery). According to Shaw's apprentice, William Habberley (one of the ultimate survivors of the disaster), Pondo tribesmen soon arrived on the scene, but offered no assistance, being more concerned to recover nails and other iron from the wreck.

Coxon and his officers knew that they were a considerable distance from the nearest European settlements, the Dutch Cape Colony to the south and Portuguese colony of Delagoa Bay to the north. In the first few days ashore, there was evidently some further interaction with the Pondo, one of whom apparently pointed to the north-east. One of the seamen, Joshua Glover, walked away with the Pondo (Habberley claimed he was "disturbed in his mind," but he and another of the seamen, John Bryan, were among the few ultimate survivors, later found to be living happily among the Pondo). Coxon decided to press south toward the Cape, insisting that they could reach it on foot within ten to seventeen days. This was a serious miscalculation, because the distance to the Cape was 400 miles, rather than the 250 that he believed (Delagoa Bay was closer).

Neither the captain nor his passengers were able to complete their journey. They made camp a few days after they had set out, and most of them died of starvation. A few of the fitter men continued, receiving assistance at several native kraals, and eighteen, including Habberley, eventually made their way to the Cape.

Dalrymple's official report to the East India Company concluded that the loss of so many lives had been caused principally by "want of management with the natives," noting that "the individuals that fell singly among them" (Joshua Glover and John Bryan) had been treated "rather with kindness than with brutality." There were rumours that some of the women passengers might have survived in a similar way. Although no conclusive evidence for this was ever found, there was certainly circumstantial evidence. Eight years after the wreck, a rescue mission, consisting of Boer farmers, set off to find survivors, as there had been persistent rumours that several women had survived and were living among the natives. This mission found three white women at a native settlement near the Umgazana River. The author Stephen Taylor has argued that two of these were survivors from the Grosvenor.

== Port Grosvenor and Sidney Turner ==
The first attempt at salvage was reported on 20 May 1880 by the paper Natal Mercury, in an article stating that Captain Sidney Turner and a friend, Lieut Beddoes, of the Durban Volunteer Artillery, had set off for Port St Johns in the vessel Adonis, had proceeded to the wreck and commenced blasting the rocks with dynamite, retrieving Indian coins and Venetian ducats as well as several ship's cannon, two of which were later displayed at the Local History Museum in Durban. (In 1896, a further 340 gold and silver coins were found.) In 1867, Turner and his brother-in-law, Walter Compton, had bought 600 acres (2.4 km^{2}) of undeveloped Crown land on the Natal South Coast between Umkomaas and the present village of Clansthal, and called the property Ellingham.

In 1881, from the profits of his salvage, Turner floated a company and commissioned the construction of a small coastal steamer, the Lady Wood, built in Greenwich. Another investor was George Hall Rennie, son of shipping magnate John T. Rennie, who came into possession of one of the Grosvenor's cannon. Turner also had a local silversmith produce a goblet from recovered silver rupees, an item which also found its way to the Local History Museum.

By the beginning of 1885, a local chief Mqikela, who had become disaffected with the British government and wanted to develop his own harbour, concluded an agreement with Turner, in which Turner was granted 20,000 acres of land, including the coastline on which the Grosvenor had foundered. In return for this, Turner was to select a suitable site for a harbour and undertake the necessary construction work. The site chosen for this new venture was at the mouth of the Mkweni River, close to the site of the Grosvenor wreck. Turner named it Port Grosvenor.

As Port Captain and harbourmaster, Turner collected customs dues and managed the harbour and pilotage. Turner was obliged by his financial circumstances to resign himself to this situation as he, by 1884, had a family of seven children and a wife to support. Despite objections from the Cape Government the port was officially opened.

The Cape Government later declared Turner's concession illegal under tribal law, and he forfeited the land, his home and his position. The family moved to Port St Johns and Port Grosvenor faded into obscurity, the last ship calling there in January 1886 being the London-built coaster SS Somtseu, named for Theophilus Shepstone.

== Bibliography ==
- Allen, William (1823). Accounts of shipwreck and of other disasters at sea: designed to be interesting and useful to mariners, with an appendix, containing Dr. Payson's address to seamen and a few prayers for their use.
- Taylor, Stephen (2004). Caliban's Shore: The Wreck of the Grosvenor and the Strange Fate of Her Survivors. ISBN 978-0-393-05085-1.
