= Chrissiesmeer =

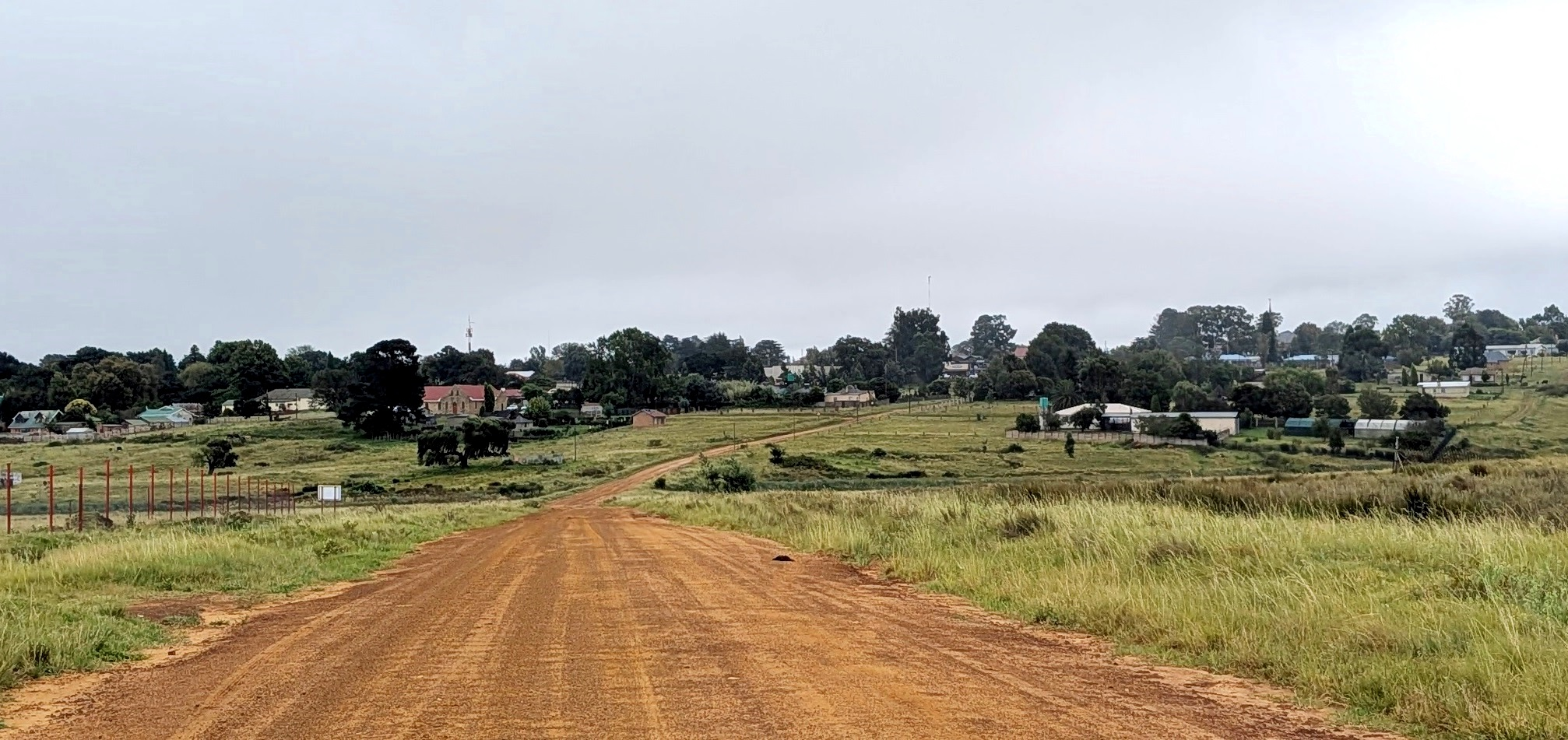
- Seen from the south

- Location within Mpumalanga Location within South Africa
- Coordinates: 26.278°S 30.213°E
- Country: South Africa
- Province: Mpumalanga
- District: Gert Sibande
- Municipality: Msukaligwa
  - Councillor: (ANC)

Area
  - Total: 3.25 km^{2} (1.25 sq mi)
- Elevation: 1,720 m (5,640 ft)

Population (2011)
  - Total: 4,012
  - Density: 1,230/km^{2} (3,200/sq mi)

Racial makeup (2011)
  - Black African: 94.0%
  - Coloured: 0.1%
  - Indian/Asian: 0.7%
  - White: 5.2%

First languages (2011)
  - Zulu: 62.4%
  - Swazi: 26.5%
  - Afrikaans: 4.5%
  - English: 2.4%
  - Other: 4.2%
- Time zone: UTC+2 (SAST)
- Area code: 017

Chrissiesmeer (Lake Chrissie) is a small town situated on the N17 road in Msukaligwa Local Municipality, in a wetland area of Mpumalanga province in South Africa, on the northern banks of the eponymous Lake Chrissie.

== History ==
The San inhabited this area along with the Tlou-tle people who lived on rafts in the larger lakes.

== Geography ==
In total there are more than 270 lakes in the immediate area (located not far from Carolina). About 20,000 flamingo come into the area to breed every year.
