= Masemola =

Masemola is a Northern Sotho surname. People with this surname include:

- Fannie Masemola (b. 1964), South African police official
- Manche Masemola (1913–1928), South African Christian martyr
- Jafta Masemola (1929–1990), South African anti-apartheid activist
- Richard Masemola (fl. 1960s), South African Anglican priest

== See also ==
- Ga Masemola, village in Limpopo Province, South Africa
