= Grosvenor Place (disambiguation) =

Grosvenor Place may refer to:

- Grosvenor Place, London
- Grosvenor Place (Sydney), Australia
- Grosvenor Place, Bath, England
