= List of lagoons of South Africa =

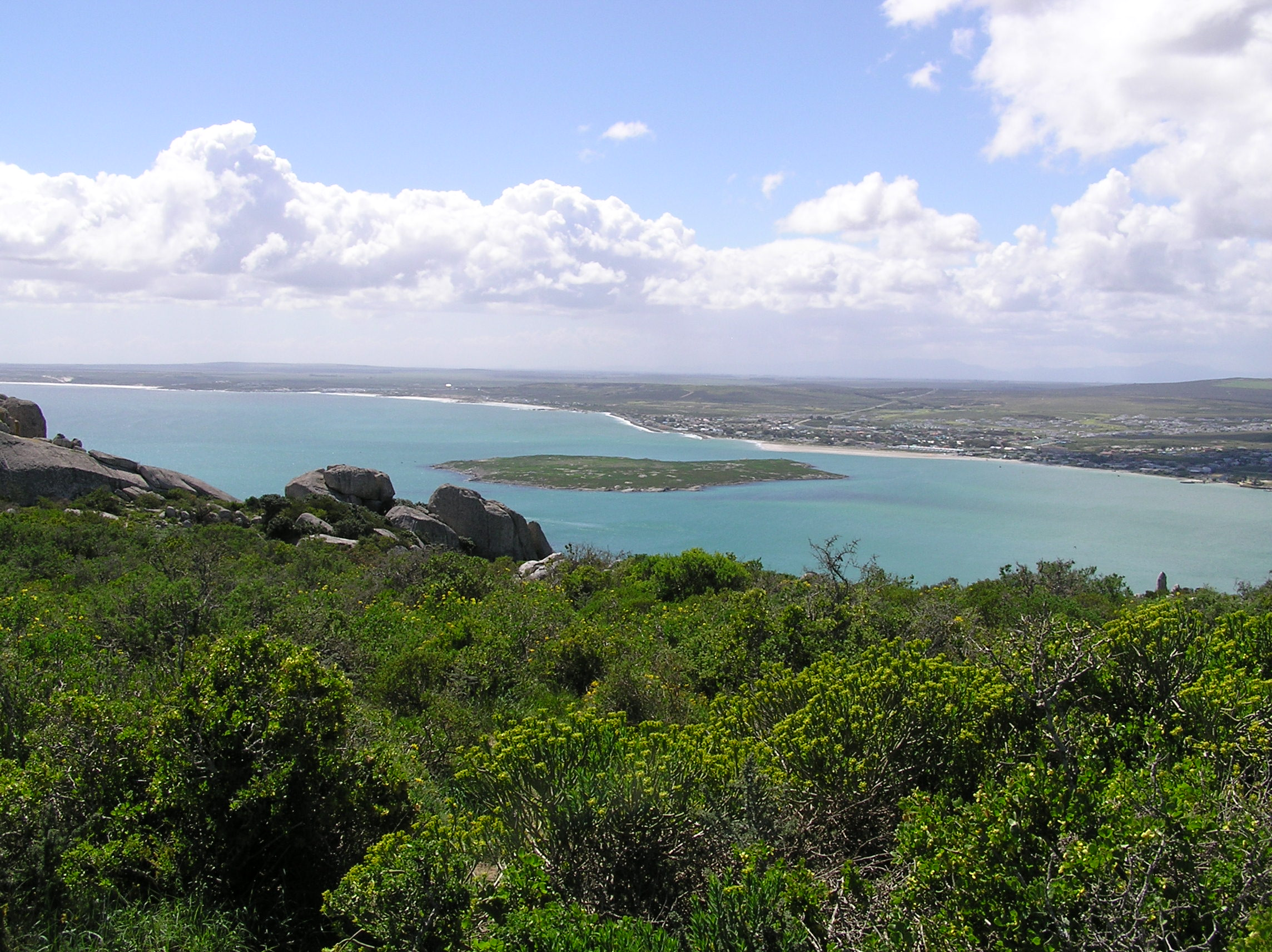
Langebaan Lagoon, Western Cape

This is a partial list of lagoons of South Africa. A lagoon is a shallow body of water separated from a larger body of water by a narrow landform, such as reefs, barrier islands, barrier peninsulas, or isthmuses.

== List of lagoons of South Africa ==
Name	Province	Nearest Town	Coordinates	Remarks
Sodwana Lagoon	KwaZulu-Natal	Sodwana Bay	27°32′S 32°40′E	
St Lucia Lagoon	KwaZulu-Natal	St Lucia	28°23′S 32°25′E	Is already on the list of Estuaries, because it is fed by a river.
Mdloti Lagoon	KwaZulu-Natal	Tongaat	29°38′S 31°7′E	Although fed by a river, its separated from the sea.
Ohlanga Lagoon	KwaZulu-Natal	Umhlanga	29°42′S 31°5′E	as above.
uMngeni Lagoon	KwaZulu-Natal	Athlone	29°48′S 31°2′E	Not on the list of True Estuaries.
Manzimtoti Lagoon	KwaZulu-Natal	Amanzimtoti	30°3′S 30°52′E	Not on the list of True Estuaries.
Lovu Lagoon	KwaZulu-Natal	Illovo Beach	30°6′S 30°51′E	Not on the list of True Estuaries.
uMgababa Lagoon	KwaZulu-Natal	near Illovo Beach	30°9′S 30°49′E	Since the Umgababa Dam was built the river nearly dried up.
aMahlongwa Lagoon	KwaZulu-Natal	near Scottburgh	30°15′S 30°45′E	Although fed by a small stream.
Umzinto Lagoon	KwaZulu-Natal	near Pennington	30°22′S 30°42′E	Although fed by a small stream.
Fafa Lagoon	KwaZulu-Natal	near Ifafa Beach	30°27′S 30°39′E	Although fed by a small stream.
Knysna Lagoon	Western Cape	Knysna	34°05′S 23°04′E	Is already on the list of Estuaries, as it is not a true Lagoon
Langebaan Lagoon	Western Cape	Langebaan	33°1′S 18°3′E	Salt water lagoon

== See also ==
- Richards Bay, a city situated on a lagoon
- List of estuaries of South Africa
- List of lakes in South Africa
- List of Bays of South Africa
- List of rivers of South Africa
- List of reservoirs and dams in South Africa
