= Port Grosvenor =

Coordinates: 31.373°S 29.910°E

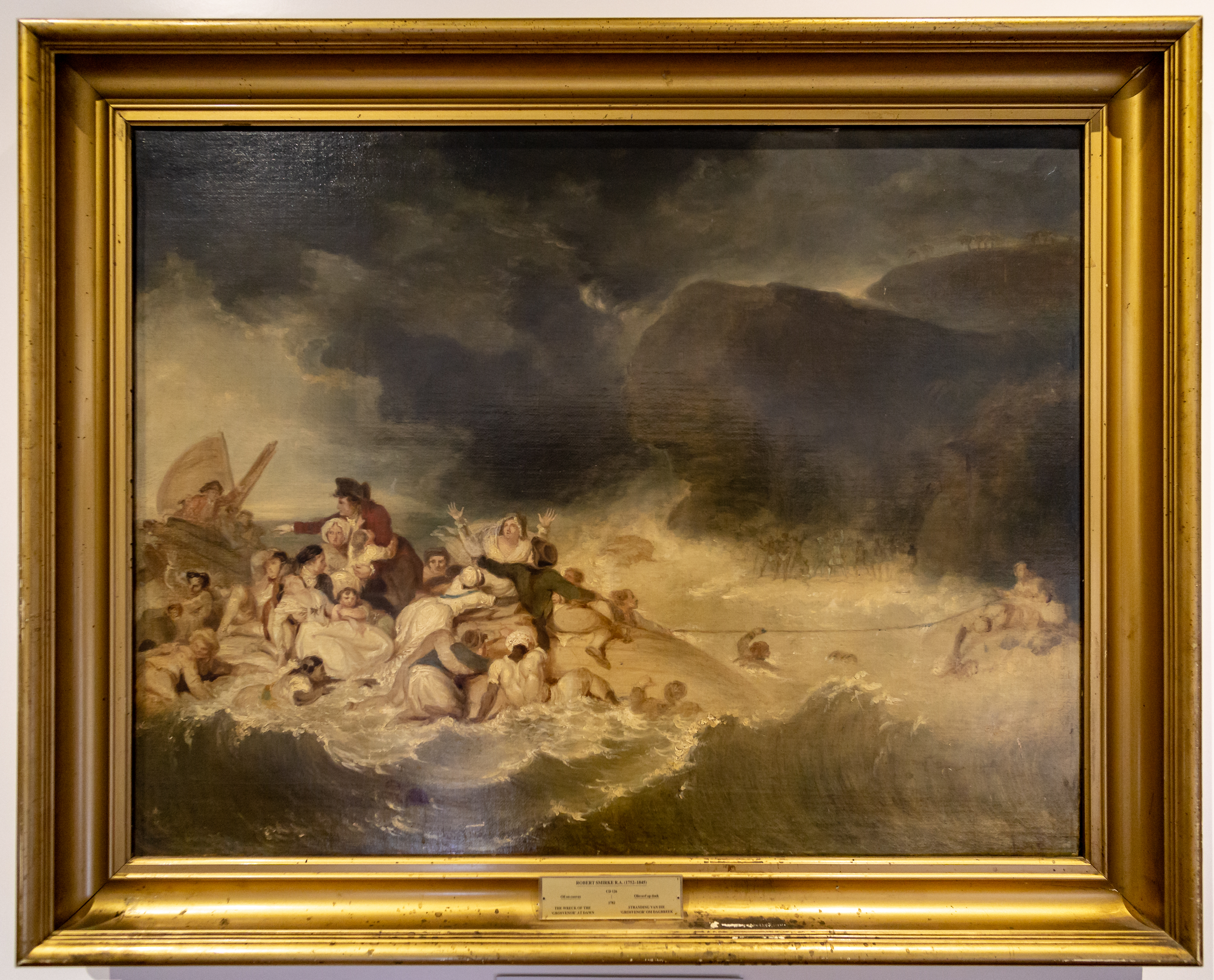

Port Grosvenor was a harbour on the Wild Coast in South Africa, near the spot where the Indiaman Grosvenor was wrecked on 4 August 1782. It was only in use in 1885 and 1886.

== History ==
The construction of Port Grosvenor was initiated by Captain Sidney Turner, who in 1867, with his father-in-law Walter Compton, had bought 600 acres (2.4 km^{2}) of undeveloped Crown Land on the Natal South Coast between Umkomaas and the present village of Clansthal. Turner had launched the first salvage attempt of the Grosvenor as reported on 20 May 1880 by the paper Natal Mercury. Turner and a friend, Lieut Beddoes, of the Durban Volunteer Artillery, had set off for Port St Johns in the vessel Adonis, had proceeded to the wreck and commenced blasting the rocks with dynamite.

By the beginning of 1885 a local chief Mqikela, who had grown disaffected with the British government and wanted to develop his own harbour, concluded an agreement with Turner, in which Turner was granted 20,000 acres of land, including the coastline on which the Grosvenor had foundered. In return for this Turner was to select a suitable site for a harbour and undertake the necessary construction work. The site chosen for this new venture was at the mouth of the Mkweni River, close to the site of the Grosvenor wreck. Turner named it Port Grosvenor.

As port captain and harbourmaster, Turner collected customs dues and managed the harbour and pilotage. Turner was obliged by his financial circumstances to resign himself to this situation as he, by 1884, had a family of seven children and a wife to support. Despite objections from the Cape Government the port was officially opened.

The Cape Government, despite having no jurisdiction in the area, later declared Turner's concession illegal under tribal law, and he forfeited the land, his home and his position. The family moved to Port St Johns and Port Grosvenor faded into obscurity, the last ship calling there in January 1886 being the coaster SS Somtseu, named for Theophilus Shepstone. The Somtseu (#77075 1878–1897) had been built in London in 1878 and specially designed to cope with the shallow harbours of the Natal coastline; it had also been the first boat to call in 1880 at the newly deepened South Shepstone harbour, later to be named Port Shepstone.
