= Saldanha Bay =

Natural harbour on the south-western coast of South Africa

- Saldanhabaai (Afrikaans)
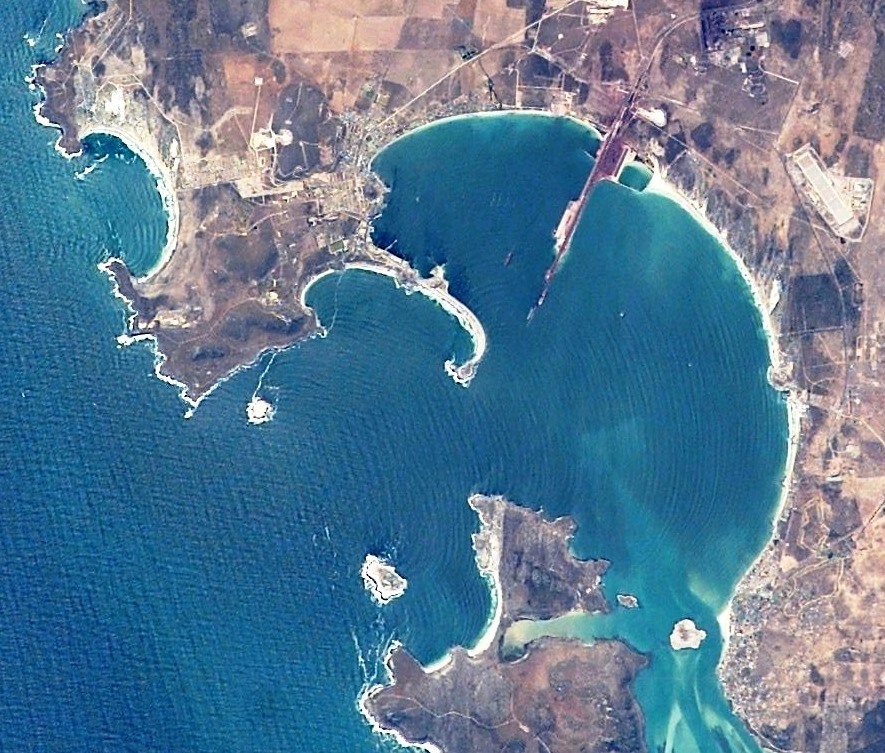
- Saldanha Bay from space in 2003. To the bottom (south) is the Langebaan Lagoon

- Location in South Africa
- Coordinates: 33°02′05″S 18°00′35″E
- Ocean/sea sources: Southern Atlantic Ocean
- Basin countries: South Africa
- Max. length: 12 km (7.5 mi)
- Max. width: 11 km (6.8 mi)
- Islands: St Croix Islands, Bird Islands
- Settlements: Saldanha, Langebaan

Saldanha Bay (Afrikaans: Saldanhabaai) is a natural harbour on the south-western coast of South Africa. The town that developed on the northern shore of the bay, also called Saldanha, was incorporated with five other towns into the Saldanha Bay Local Municipality in 2000. The current population of the municipality is estimated at 72,000.

The place is mentioned in the first edition of John Locke's Two Treatises of Government as an example of the state of nature.

Saldanha Bay's location makes it a paradise for the watersport enthusiast, and its local economy being strongly dependent on fishing, mussels, seafood processing, the steel industry and the harbour. Furthermore, its sheltered harbour plays an important part in the Sishen-Saldanha iron-ore project (connected by the Sishen-Saldanha Railway Line) at which Saldanha Steel takes center stage.

== Geography ==
Saldanha Bay is located about 105 kilometres (65 mi) north west of Cape Town. It faces southwest and is 11 km long and 12 km wide. The Langebaan Lagoon, a SE prolongation of the bay, extends for 14 km southeastwards from the SE corner of the inner bay by Langebaan.

== History ==
Saldanha Bay is named after António de Saldanha, captain of a vessel in Albuquerque's fleet which visited South Africa in 1503. The name was first given to Table Bay, where Saldanha's ship cast anchor. On Table Bay being given its present name in 1601, the older appellation was transferred to the bay now called after Saldanha. On 3 April 1702, the Dutch East India Company ship Merestein was wrecked near Jutten Island while attempting to enter Saldanha Bay. Of approximately 200 people aboard, 99 survived. In 1781 a British squadron under Commodore George Johnstone seized six Dutch East Indiamen, which, fearing an attack on Cape Town, had taken refuge in Saldanha Bay. This was the only achievement, so far as South Africa was concerned, of the expedition despatched to seize Cape Town during the war of 1781–1783.

Diplomat Edmund Roberts visited the Bay in 1833. He noted that it was "well sheltered from violent winds, having a sufficient depth of water, but the country is very sandy and agriculture but little attended to; a few cattle and sheep are raised among the scanty herbage." He suggested that it was an uneventful area to visit, except for a few areas in the Bay where whales resided during his visit.

Saldanha Bay is also home to numerous fish canneries. The most notable of these is the Saldanha Bay Canning Company, founded by James Kasner and Ellis Silverman in 1905.

With strong historic military links Saldanha is also host to a Naval training base and the South African Military Academy. The SAS Saldanha Nature Reserve offers a display of wildflowers during late winter and spring while southern right whales also visit the waters in and around the nature reserve. The area has a Mediterranean climate but the annual rainfall is quite low; it verges on the desert region of Namaqualand.

== Modern day ==
The port developed into a modern harbour only recently, when it became necessary to facilitate the export of iron ore from the Northern Cape. This required the construction of a railway more than 800 kilometres to the mines at Sishen in the Northern Cape and the construction of a deepwater jetty in Saldanha Bay to accommodate Capesize ore carrier ships.

== Gallery ==
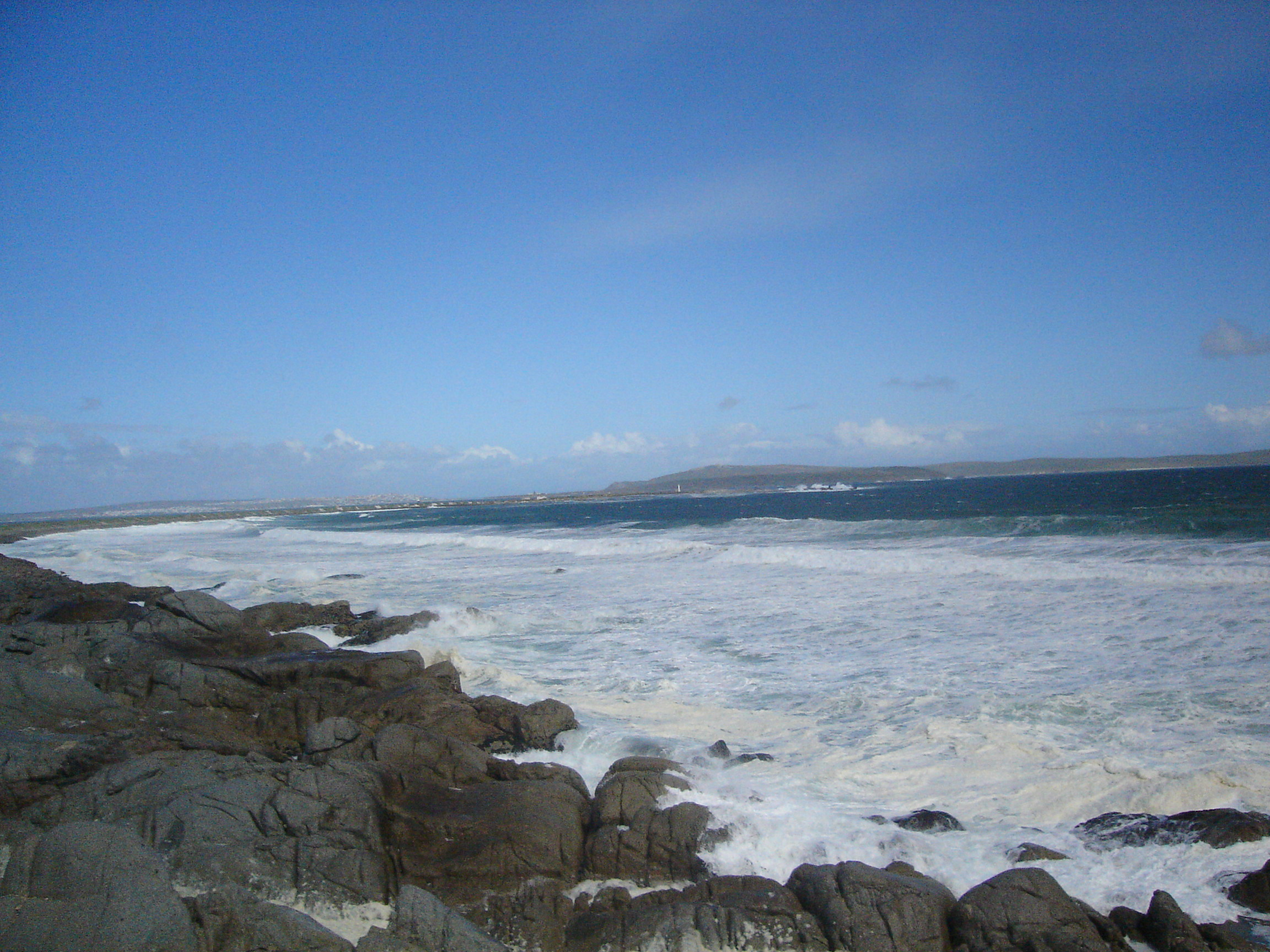
Outer bay with surf pounding the shore

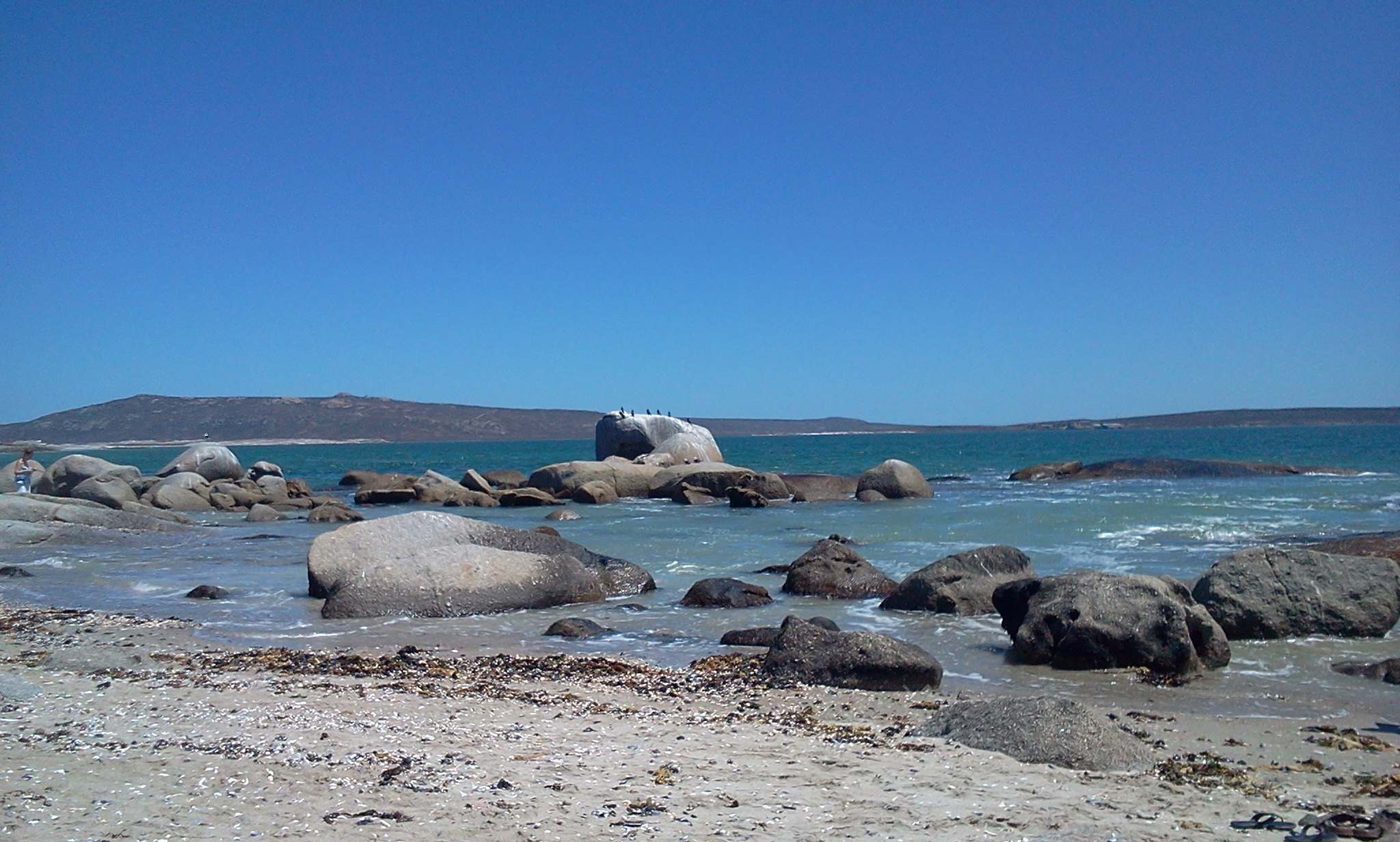
View of the inner bay from Langebaan

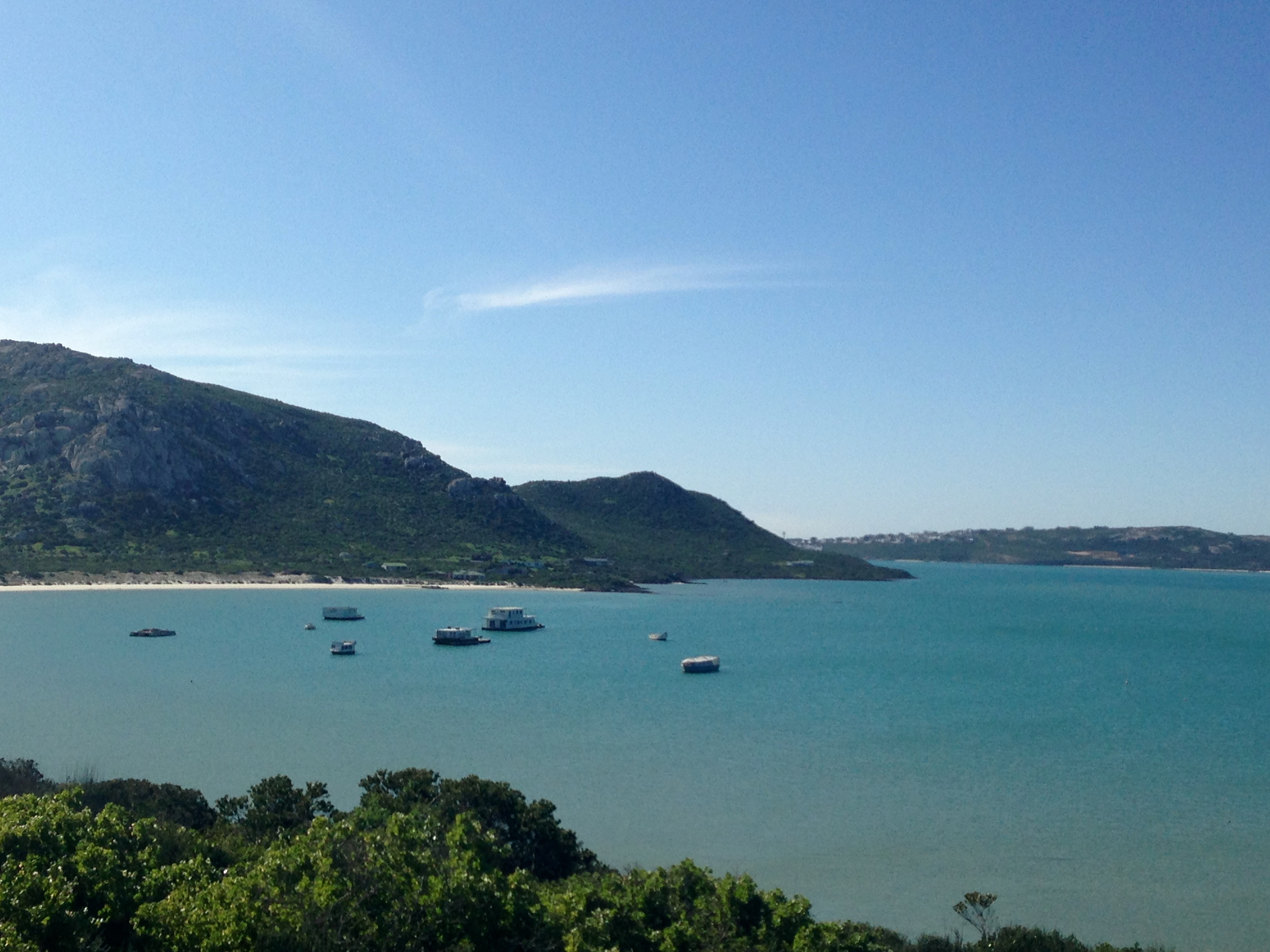
View of the Langebaan Lagoon

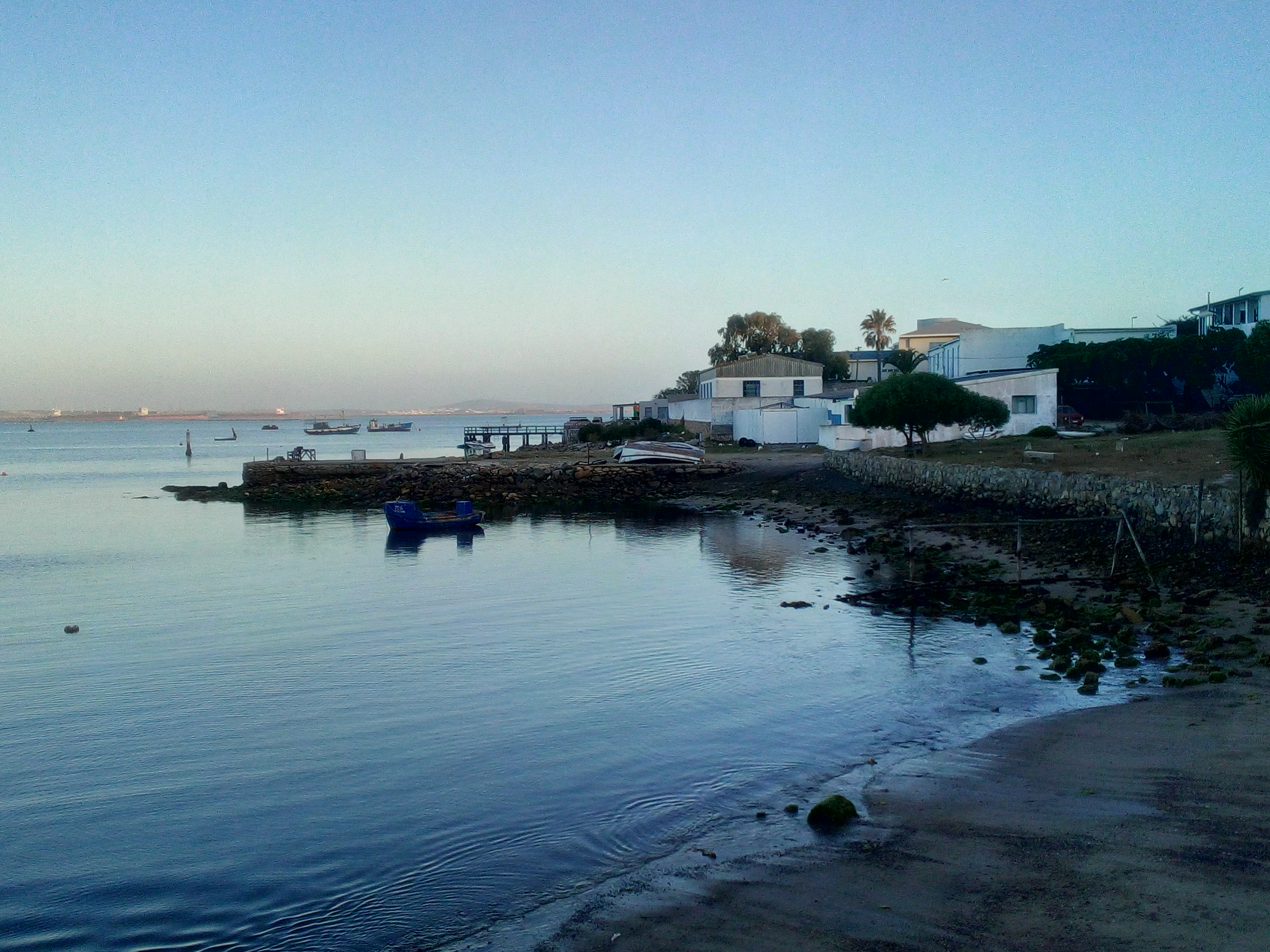
View of a fishing house situated near the center of the bay

== See also ==
- List of bays of South Africa
- Battle of Saldanha Bay (1781)
- Capitulation of Saldanha Bay
- Saldanha man
- West Coast National Park
- List of deepest natural harbours
