= Lake Chrissie =

- Chrissiesmeer (Afrikaans)
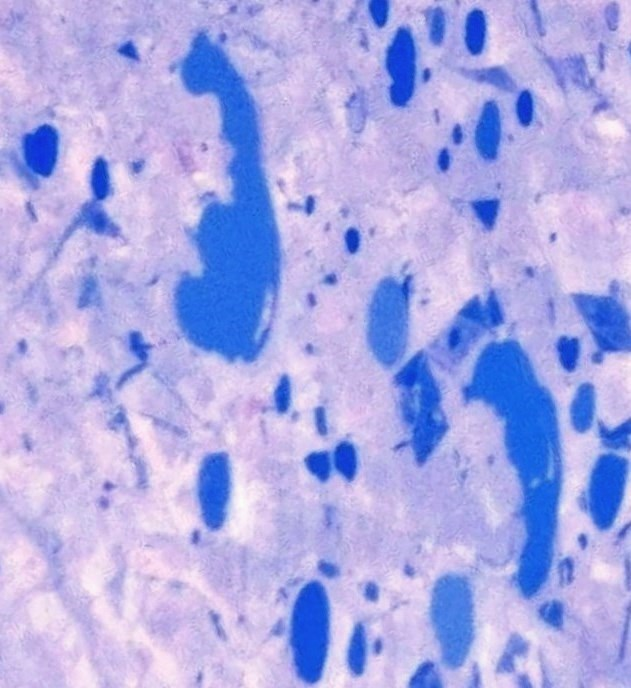
- Satellite photo of Lake Chrissie. (The large lake in the top left)

- Location within South Africa
- Location: Msukaligwa Local Municipality (Gert Sibande District Municipality), Mpumalanga, South Africa
- Coordinates: 26°20′S 30°13′E
- Type: Lake
- Max. length: 9 kilometres (5.6 mi)
- Max. width: 3 kilometres (1.9 mi)
- Max. depth: 6 metres (20 ft)

Lake Chrissie (Afrikaans: Chrissiesmeer) is a South African lake in Msukaligwa Local Municipality, Mpumalanga. It is a shallow and large body of water, with a maximum depth of about 6 metres (20 ft), 9 kilometres (5.6 mi) long, 3 kilometres (1.9 mi) wide. The lake is named after Christiana Pretorius, daughter of Marthinus Wessel Pretorius, the first president of the Boer Transvaal Republic. The lake is also informally known as "Matotoland" (meaning "land of frogs") and its Swazi name is "Kachibibi" (meaning "big lake"). The Sotho name is Seokodibeng, meaning the place of many waters.

A famous battle of the Second Boer War was fought by Lake Chrissie on 6 February 1901.

== See also ==
- Chrissiesmeer, a local settlement
