= List of shipwrecks in 1781 =

The List of shipwrecks in 1781 includes some ships sunk, wrecked or otherwise lost during 1781.

table of contents
1781
Jan	Feb	Mar	Apr
May	Jun	Jul	Aug
Sep	Oct	Nov	Dec
Unknown date

== January ==
=== 8 January ===
List of shipwrecks: 8 January 1781
Ship	State	Description
Douglass	Great Britain	The ship was driven ashore in Stokes Bay.

=== 11 January ===
List of shipwrecks: 11 January 1781
Ship	State	Description
Neptune	Great Britain	The transport ship was run down and sunk by Sykes (Great Britain) with the loss of more than twenty lives. She was on a voyage from The Downs to Portsmouth, Hampshire.

=== 22 January ===
List of shipwrecks: 22 January 1781
Ship	State	Description
Supply	Great Britain	The ship was wrecked in Start Bay with the loss of all hands. She was on a voyage from Liverpool, Lancashire to London.

=== 23 January ===
List of shipwrecks: 23 January 1781
Ship	State	Description
Childers	Great Britain	The privateer was driven ashore at Paignton, Devon.
HMS Culloden	(Kingdom of Great Britain) Royal Navy	American Revolutionary War: The third rate ship of the line ran aground 50 yards (46 m) off Will′s Point at Montauk, New York, United States, during a gale and snowstorm. After attempts to refloat her failed, she was stripped and in March 1781 she was set on fire to prevent capture. She burned to the waterline, and the remains of her wreck settled in 20 feet (6.1 m) of water. When her wreck was rediscovered in the 1970s, Will's Point was renamed Culloden Point.
Mary	France	The ship, a cartel, was driven ashore and damaged at Paignton. She was later refloated.

=== 28 January ===
List of shipwrecks: 28 January 1781
Ship	State	Description
Favourite	Great Britain	The privateer was driven ashore at Lymington, Hampshire. She was refloated on 8 February.
Nossa Senhora do Pilar e São João Baptista	Portugal	The ship was wrecked at Ceulagh, County Cork, Ireland. She was on a voyage from Lisbon to Dublin, Ireland.

=== 30 January ===
List of shipwrecks: 30 January 1781
Ship	State	Description
Theresa	Dutch Republic	The brigantine was driven ashore and wrecked at West Bexington, Dorset, Great Britain.

=== Unknown date ===
List of shipwrecks: Unknown date in January 1781
Ship	State	Description
Johanna Charlotta	Dutch Republic	The ship was lost whilst on a voyage from Ostend to Genoa and Livorno, Grand Duchy of Tuscany.
John	Ireland	The ship was driven ashore and wrecked at Beachy Head, Sussex, Great Britain.
L'Immaculée Conception	Spain	The ship was lost at Ayamonte with the loss of five of six of her crew. She was on a voyage from St. Andero to Cádiz.
Lucente Aurora	Republic of Venice	The ship was wrecked on the Woolpack, in the North Sea. She was on a voyage from Venice and Trieste to London, Great Britain.
Madonna Del Lauro & St. Anime Del Purgatorio	Papal States	The ship was lost at "Sassaie", Sardinia. She was on a voyage from Exeter, Devon, Great Britain to Civita Vechia.
Newtown	Great Britain	The ship was lost near Liverpool, Lancashire. She was on a voyage from Tingmouth, Devon to Liverpool.
Pink	Great Britain	The ship was wrecked on the Abrolho Bank. Her crew were rescued. She was on a voyage from New York, United States to Jamaica.
Racehorse	Great Britain	The schooner was driven ashore and wrecked at Beachy Head.
Southampton	Great Britain	The ship was driven ashore and wrecked at Beachy Head.
Spitfire	Great Britain	The privateer foundered in the English Channel off Start Point, Devon.
HMS Syren	(Kingdom of Great Britain) Royal Navy	The Porcupine-class post ship was driven ashore and wrecked at Beachy Head.

== February ==
=== 2 February ===
List of shipwrecks: 2 February 1781
Ship	State	Description
Samuel	Great Britain	The ship sank and capsized in the River Thames. She was on a voyage from London to Jamaica.

=== 7 February ===
List of shipwrecks: 7 February 1781
Ship	State	Description
Maria Margaretha	Denmark	The ship was crushed by ice off Elsinore. She later came ashore near Halmstad, Sweden. Maria Margaretha was on a voyage from Copenhagen to Saint Thomas, Virgin Islands.
Princess Louisa	Denmark	The ship was driven ashore on the Swedish coast. She was on a voyage from Copenhagen to Saint Croix. Princess Louisa was later refloated and taken in to Copenhagen for repairs.
São Boaventura	Portugal	The ship was wrecked on "Masamaede Island", off Madagascar. She was on a voyage from Lisbon to the Malabar Coast.

=== 11 February ===
List of shipwrecks: 11 February 1781
Ship	State	Description
Echo	Great Britain	The brig was driven ashore and wrecked in Deadman's Bay. Her crew were rescued.
Nimble	Great Britain	The cutter was wrecked in Mount's Bay with the loss of 28 of her 59 crew.
Thames	Great Britain	The victualling ship was driven ashore and wrecked at Plymouth Hoe, Devon. Her crew were rescued.

=== 12 February ===
List of shipwrecks: 12 February 1781
Ship	State	Description
Esther	Great Britain	The stores ship was in collision with HM hired armed ship Raike ( (Kingdom of Great Britain) Royal Navy) and foundered in The Downs with the loss of two or three of her crew.

=== 13 February ===
List of shipwrecks: 13 February 1781
Ship	State	Description
Amsterdam	Sweden	The brigantine was driven ashore and wrecked at West Bexington, Dorset, Great Britain with the loss of five of her crew and a passenger. She was on a voyage from Naples, Kingdom of Sicily to London, Great Britain.

=== 16 February ===
List of shipwrecks: 16 February 1781
Ship	State	Description
General Barker	British East India Company	The East Indiaman was lost off Scheveningen, on the Dutch coast. Her crew were rescued. She was on a voyage from the East Indies to London.

=== 22 February ===
List of shipwrecks: 22 February 1781
Ship	State	Description
Fame	United States	The privateer foundered in the Atlantic Ocean off Peck's Beach, New Jersey.

=== 26 February ===
List of shipwrecks: 26 February 1781
Ship	State	Description
Duke William	Great Britain	The transport ship was wrecked on Barbuda.

=== Unknown date ===
List of shipwrecks: Unknown date in February 1781
Ship	State	Description
Ann	Great Britain	The ship was driven ashore near Rye, Sussex. She was on a voyage from Londonderry, Ireland to London.
Blandford	Great Britain	The ship was lost at Newry, County Antrim, Ireland.
Carpenter	Great Britain	The ship foundered in the Swin. Her crew were rescued. She was on a voyage from Liverpool, Lancashire to London.
Dutchess	Great Britain	The privateer was in collision with Houghton (Great Britain) and foundered in The Downs with some loss of life.
Experiment	Great Britain	The privateer was in collision with another vessel in The Downs and foundered. Her crew were rescued.
Fernought	Great Britain	The privateer struck a rock and foundered in the Firth of Forth. Her crew were rescued
Free Trade	Great Britain	The privateer was driven ashore and wrecked at Newry.
Henry & Maria	France	Anglo-French War (1778–83): The ship, a prize, was driven ashore near Wexford, Ireland.
Hope	Great Britain	The ship was driven ashore on the coast of France. She was on a voyage from Tobago to London.
L'Aimea	France	Anglo-French War (1778-1783): The ship, a prize, was lost on the French coast. She was on a voyage from Penzance, Cornwall, Great Britain to Jersey, Channel Islands.
Mary Ann	Great Britain	The ship was lost near Bristol, Gloucestershire. She was on a voyage from Plymouth, Devon to Bristol.
London	Great Britain	The ship was lost with all hands. She was on a voyage from Liverpool, Lancashire to London.
New Judith	Ireland	The ship was wrecked near Wexford. Her crew were rescued. She was on a voyage from Newry to Cork and the West Indies.
New Newry Paquet	Ireland	The ship was driven ashore at Newry. She was on a voyage from Newry to London.
Prince of Wales	Great Britain	The ship was driven ashore and wrecked at Pegwell Bay, Kent. She was on a voyage from London to Dublin, Ireland.
Rodney	Great Britain	The ship was driven ashore at Southampton, Hampshire.
St. Antonio de Lisboa	Portugal	The ship was lost near Castle Town, Isle of Man. She was on a voyage from Lisbon to Dublin.
Thetis	Great Britain	The ship was driven ashore and wrecked near Cromer, Norfolk. She was on a voyage from Aberdeen to London.
William & Ann	Ireland	The ship was wrecked near Beerhaven, County Cork. She was on a voyage from Greenock, Renfrewshire, Great Britain to Cork.
Zee Fortune	Dutch Republic	Fourth Anglo-Dutch War The ship, a prize, was lost off Wexford with the loss of all hands.

== March ==
=== 18 March ===
List of shipwrecks: 18 March 1781
Ship	State	Description
USS Saratoga	United States Navy	The sloop sank in a storm with all hands.

=== 30 March ===
List of shipwrecks: 30 March 1781
Ship	State	Description
Black Prince	France	The ship, a prize of HMS Cruizer and HMS Lively (both (Kingdom of Great Britain) Royal Navy), was driven ashore and wrecked at Falmouth, Cornwall, Great Britain. Her crew were rescued.
Dutchess de Chartres	(Kingdom of France) French East India Company	The East Indiaman, a prize of the privateer Phœnix (Great Britain) was driven ashore and wrecked at Falmouth with the loss of a crew member.

=== Unknown date ===
List of shipwrecks: Unknown date in March 1781
Ship	State	Description
Charlotte	Great Britain	The ship was wrecked on the coast of France. She was on a voyage from London to Naples and Messina, Kingdom of Sicily.
Fame	Great Britain	The ship foundered in the English Channel off Dover, Kent. She was on a voyage from London to Dublin, Ireland.
Hope	Great Britain	The ship was driven ashore and wrecked on the coast of Cornwall. She was on a voyage from London to Belfast, Ireland.
Immaenlata Concezione	Flag unknown	The ship was wrecked on the coast of Portugal. She was on a voyage from Falmouth, Cornwall, Great Britain to a Mediterranean port.
La Guepe	French Navy	American Revolutionary War:The 14 gun cutter ran aground on mud flats and was wrecked near Cape Charles while pursuing a British privateer. Her crew was rescued.
L'Amiene del Purgatorio	Flag unknown	The ship was wrecked on the coast of Portugal. She was on a voyage from St. Ives, Cornwall to a Mediterranean port.
Le Lenier	France	The ship was lost in the Ratt, off Brest. She was on a voyage from Bordeaux to the West Indies.
Minte au Ciel	France	The ship was lost in the Ratt. She was on a voyage from Bordeaux to the West Indies.
Penelope	Great Britain	The ship was driven ashore and wrecked at Ramsgate, Kent. She was on a voyage from London to Halifax, Nova Scotia, British America.
Success	Great Britain	The ship was driven ashore near Chichester, Sussex. She was on a voyage from Dublin, Ireland to London.

== April ==
=== 10 April ===
List of shipwrecks: 10 April 1781
Ship	State	Description
Ann	Great Britain	The sloop was driven ashore on Sanday, Orkney Islands. She was on a voyage from Bergen, Norway to Kirkwall, Orkney Islands.

=== 11 April ===
List of shipwrecks: 11 April 1781
Ship	State	Description
Nossa Senhora do Carmo a Dolphin	Portugal	The ship capsized at Tenby, Pembrokeshire, Great Britain. She had been on a voyage from Lisbon to Amsterdam, Dutch Republic but had put into Tenby.

=== 13 April ===
List of shipwrecks: 13 April 1781
Ship	State	Description
Johanna	Sweden	The ship was wrecked on Anholt, Denmark. Her crew survived. She was on a voyage from Bordeaux, France to Stockholm.

=== 14 April ===
List of shipwrecks: 14 April 1781
Ship	State	Description
Hawke	Great Britain	The ship struck rocks at Bermuda and was wrecked. Her crew were rescued. She was on a voyage from Glasgow, Renfrewshire to Bermuda.

=== 21 April ===
List of shipwrecks: 21 April 1781
Ship	State	Description
Bee	Great Britain	Anglo-French War (1778–83): The ship was driven ashore at Aldeburgh, Suffolk by two French privateers and was captured. She was taken to a French port. Bee had been on a voyage from Milford Haven, Pembrokeshire to Great Yarmouth, Norfolk.

=== 28 April ===
List of shipwrecks: 28 April 1781
Ship	State	Description
Hopkins	Great Britain	The stores ship capsized at Gosport, Hampshire. She was on a voyage from London to Portsmouth, Hampshire.

=== Unknown date ===
List of shipwrecks: Unknown date in April 1781
Ship	State	Description
Betsey	Great Britain	The ship was wrecked on São Miguel Island, Azores. She was on a voyage from New York to the Western Islands.
Count Schimmerman	(Denmark) Danish Asiatic Company	The East Indiaman foundered in the North Sea off the Isle of May, Scotland. Her crew were rescued. She was bound to India.
Draper	Great Britain	The ship foundered in the English Channel off Dungeness, Kent. She was on a voyage from London to Newry, County Antrim, Ireland.
Endeavour	Great Britain	The ship was lost in the Isles of Scilly. She was on a voyage from Liverpool, Lancashire to Portsmouth, Hampshire.
John & Mary	Great Britain	The ship was lost near Lübeck.
Couronne	French Navy	The Saint-Esprit-class ship of the line was destroyed by fire at Brest.
Lady Betty	Great Britain	The ship foundered in the Atlantic Ocean off Madeira. Her crew were rescued. She was on a voyage from Newfoundland, British America to Madeira.
Mary	Great Britain	The ship was driven ashore in the Saltee Islands, County Wexford, Ireland. She was on a voyage from Saint Kitts to London or Liverpool.
Zeebergh	Dutch Republic	The ship was captured by a French privateer but was subsequently wrecked on the French coast. She was on a voyage from Liverpool to Ostend.

== May ==
=== 2 May ===
List of shipwrecks: 2 May 1781
Ship	State	Description
Enterprize	Great Britain	Anglo-French War (1778–83): The ship was captured by the privateer Victory (France). she was stripped of her guns and sunk. Enterprize was on a voyage from Swansey, Glamorgan to Portsmouth, Hampshire.

=== 7 May ===
List of shipwrecks: 7 May 1781
Ship	State	Description
Duke of Athol	Great Britain	The ship was driven ashore in Riga Bay.
Jenny and Peggy	Great Britain	The ship was driven ashore and wrecked in Riga Bay.
Nelly	Great Britain	The ship was driven ashore in Riga Bay.

=== 17 May ===
List of shipwrecks: 17 May 1781
Ship	State	Description
Olive Branch	Great Britain	The privateer was wrecked on the coast of Ireland.

=== 28 May ===
List of shipwrecks: 28 May 1781
Ship	State	Description
Rose in June	Great Britain	The ship struck rocks off Land's End, Cornwall and foundered with the loss of all but one of her crew. She was on a voyage from Falmouth, Cornwall to Swansea, Glamorgan.

=== Unknown date ===
List of shipwrecks: Unknown date in May 1781
Ship	State	Description
America	Great Britain	The ship sank near Topsham, Devon. She was on a voyage from Exon, Devon to Ostend, Dutch Republic.
Espírito Santa Rainha de Aug	Portugal	The ship was driven ashore near Aberystwyth, Cardiganshire, Great Britain.
George	Great Britain	The ship capsized at Fyall, Azores. Her crew were rescued. She was on a voyage from Bristol, Gloucestershire to Fyall and Quebec, British America.
Industry	Great Britain	The ship was lost off the coast of Scotland. She was on a voyage from Liverpool, Lancashire to Riga, Russia.

== June ==
=== 7 June ===
List of shipwrecks: 7 June 1781
Ship	State	Description
HM hired armed ship Molly	(Kingdom of Great Britain) Royal Navy	The hired armed ship caught fire, exploded, and sank off Point Lynas, Anglesey. There were about 40 survivors.

=== 10 June ===
List of shipwrecks: 10 June 1781
Ship	State	Description
Ann	Great Britain	The ship was wrecked on the Fischer Rocks, 10 leagues (30 nautical miles (56 km)) west of "Wyburgh". She was on a voyage from "Wyburgh" to Liverpool, Lancashire.
HMS Greyhound	(Kingdom of Great Britain) Royal Navy	The Mermaid-class frigate ran aground at the South Foreland, Kent and was wrecked.

=== Unknown date ===
List of shipwrecks: Unknown date in June 1781
Ship	State	Description
HMS General Arnold	(Kingdom of Great Britain) Royal Navy	American Revolution: The Row galley ran aground in the Chowan River at Edenton, North Carolina. She was then captured by local Militia troops.
Nancy	Great Britain	Anglo-French War (1778–83): The ship was captured off Milford, Pembrokeshire by the privateer Franklin (France) and was sunk by her. Her crew were taken on board the privateer. Nancy was on a voyage from Tinmouth, Devon to Liverpool, Lancashire.

== July ==
=== 3 July ===
List of shipwrecks: 3 July 1781
Ship	State	Description
Brilliant	Great Britain	The ship struck a rock off the Mew Stone and was wrecked. She was on a voyage from Wales to Topsham, Devon.

=== 21 July ===
List of shipwrecks: 21 July 1781
Ship	State	Description
Honkoop	Dutch East India Company	Fourth Anglo-Dutch War, Battle of Saldanha Bay: The East Indiaman was captured by the Royal Navy. Hencoop was on a voyage from China to Amsterdam. She foundered in January 1782 on her voyage to England.
Middelburg	Dutch East India Company	Battle of Saldanha Bay. The East Indiaman was burnt by the Dutch of avoid capture. She was on a voyage from China to Amsterdam.

=== 23 July ===
List of shipwrecks: 23 July 1781
Ship	State	Description
Dasher	Virginia Virginia State Navy	The galley was wrecked in a gale in Lynnhaven Bay. Crew were captured after reaching shore.

=== Unknown date ===
List of shipwrecks: Unknown date in July 1781
Ship	State	Description
Good Hope	Denmark	The ship was lost near Harwich, Essex, Great Britain. She was on a voyage from Copenhagen to Lisbon, Portugal.
Serapis	France	The privateer caught fire, exploded and sank off the coast of Madagascar with the loss of eight of the 223 people on board.

== August ==
=== 1 August ===
List of shipwrecks: 1 August 1781
Ship	State	Description
Hope	Great Britain	The ship was lost in the Black River, Jamaica. She was on a voyage from Jamaica to London.

=== 2 August ===
List of shipwrecks: 2 August 1781
Ship	State	Description
Ann	Great Britain	The ship was driven ashore and wrecked at Jamaica.
Arundal	Great Britain	The ship was driven ashore at Jamaica.
Carnatic	Great Britain	The ship was driven ashore and wrecked at Jamaica.
Chambers	Great Britain	The ship was driven ashore at Jamaica.
Charming Nancy	Great Britain	The ship was wrecked at Jamaica.
Clarendon	Great Britain	The ship was driven ashore and wrecked at Jamaica.
Dispatch	Great Britain	The ship was driven ashore at Jamaica.
Endeavour	Great Britain	The ship was wrecked at Jamaica. She was on a voyage from Jamaica to Charles Town, South Carolina, United States.
Fame	Great Britain	The ship was driven ashore and wrecked at Jamaica.
Friendship	Great Britain	The ship was driven ashore and wrecked at Jamaica.
George and John	Great Britain	The ship was driven ashore and wrecked at Jamaica.
Golden Rule	Great Britain	The ship (a.k.a. Equity) was driven ashore at Jamaica.
Green-island	Great Britain	The ship was driven ashore at Jamaica.
Henry	Great Britain	The ship was driven ashore at Jamaica.
Hercules	Great Britain	The ship was lost in Annatta Bay, Jamaica.
Jamaica	Great Britain	The ship was driven ashore at Jamaica.
John	Great Britain	The ship was driven ashore and wrecked at Jamaica.
Kingston	Great Britain	The ship was driven ashore and wrecked at Jamaica.
Kitty	Great Britain	The ship was driven ashore and wrecked at Jamaica. She was on a voyage from Jamaica to London.
Lark	Great Britain	The ship was driven ashore at Jamaica.
London	Great Britain	The ship was driven ashore at Jamaica.
Mary	Great Britain	The ship was driven ashore at Jamaica.
Mentor	Great Britain	The ship was driven ashore at Jamaica.
Montague	Great Britain	The ship was driven ashore and wrecked at Jamaica.
Nancy	Great Britain	The ship was driven ashore and damaged at Jamaica. She was subsequently repaired and returned to service.
Nanny	Great Britain	The ship was driven ashore at Jamaica.
Orange Bay	Great Britain	The ship was driven ashore at Jamaica.
HMS Pelican	(Kingdom of Great Britain) Royal Navy	The Porcupine-class post ship was driven ashore and wrecked on the Morant Keys, off Jamaica.
Ransom	Great Britain	The ship was driven ashore at Jamaica.
Thetis	Great Britain	The ship was driven ashore at Jamaica.
True Britton	Great Britain	The ship was driven ashore at Jamaica.

=== 5 August ===
List of shipwrecks: 5 August 1781
Ship	State	Description
Hollandia	Dutch Republic Navy	Fourth Anglo-Dutch War, Battle of Dogger Bank: The third rate ship of the line foundered following the battle.
Vénus	French Navy	The frigate was wrecked off the Glénan Islands, Finistère. Her crew were rescued.

=== 15 August ===
List of shipwrecks: 15 August 1781
Ship	State	Description
Roberts	Great Britain	The sloop sprang a leak in the English Channel. Her crew were rescued. She came ashore in Scatshall Bay and was wrecked. Roberts was on a voyage from Exeter, Devon to Bucklers Hard, Hampshire.

=== 17 August ===
List of shipwrecks: 17 August 1781
Ship	State	Description
James and John	Great Britain	The ship was wrecked on Öland, Sweden. She was on a voyage from London to Saint Petersburg, Russia.

=== 21 August ===
List of shipwrecks: 21 August 1781
Ship	State	Description
St. Joaquim e Santa Anna	Portugal	The ship foundered in the North Sea off Rottam Island, Dutch Republic with the loss of fourteen of her seventeen crew. She was on a voyage from Porto to Hamburg.

=== 24 August ===
List of shipwrecks: 24 August 1781
Ship	State	Description
Hope	Great Britain	The ship was lost at Penzance, Cornwall. She was on a voyage from London to Belfast, County Antrim, Ireland.

=== Unknown date ===
List of shipwrecks: Unknown date in August 1781
Ship	State	Description
Friends	Ireland	The ship was driven ashore in Dublin Bay. She was on a voyage from Bordeaux, France to Dublin.
Holland's Melvaart	Dutch Republic	Fourth Anglo-Dutch War: The ship was driven ashore at the mouth of the Kenmare River by Cicero (Great Britain) and another vessel. She was burnt by her captors.
Jane	Great Britain	Anglo-French War (1778–83): The ship was captured and burnt by the privateer La Victoire (France). She was on a voyage from Swansey, Glamorgan to Youghall, County Cork, Ireland.

== September ==
=== 4 September ===
List of shipwrecks: 4 September 1781
Ship	State	Description
Valiant	United States	American Revolutionary War: The ship, a prize of Enterprize (Great Britain), was recaptured and set afire by two American privateers off Waterford, Ireland.

=== 5 September ===
List of shipwrecks: 5 September 1781
Ship	State	Description
HMS Terrible	(Kingdom of Great Britain) Royal Navy	American Revolutionary War, Battle of the Chesapeake: The Ramillies-class ship of the line was set afire and scuttled following damage sustained in battle.
Vrow Margaretta	Duchy of Holstein	The ship was driven ashore and wrecked at Whitby, Yorkshire, Great Britain.

=== 9 September ===
List of shipwrecks: 9 September 1781
Ship	State	Description
Rodney	Great Britain	The ship was driven ashore at Wexford, Ireland by three privateers. She was on a voyage from Lancaster, Lancashire to Ireland and the Leeward Islands.

=== 17 September ===
List of shipwrecks: 17 September 1781
Ship	State	Description
Venus	Great Britain	The ship departed from Newfoundland, British America for Lisbon, Portugal. No further trace, presumed foundered in the Atlantic Ocean with the loss of all hands.

=== 22 September ===
List of shipwrecks: 22 September 1781
Ship	State	Description
HMS Duchess of Cumberland	(Kingdom of Great Britain) Royal Navy	The sloop was wrecked at Cape St. Mary in heavy fog.

=== 27 September ===
List of shipwrecks: 27 September 1781
Ship	State	Description
Demoiselle Regina	Hamburg	The ship was wrecked on the coast of Flanders, Dutch Republic. She was on a voyage from Portsmouth, Hampshire, Great Britain to Hamburg
Freeden	Sweden	The ship was wrecked at Skagen, Denmark. She was on a voyage from Sweden to London, Great Britain.

=== 28 September ===
List of shipwrecks: 28 September 1781
Ship	State	Description
Lübeck	Lübeck	The ship was wrecked on the coast of Flanders, Dutch Republic. She was on a voyage from Portsmouth, Hampshire, Great Britain to Hamburg.
Maria Cornelia	Dutch Republic	The ship was driven ashore at Ostend. She was on a voyage from Ostend to Saint Thomas, Virgin Islands.

=== 29 September ===
List of shipwrecks: 29 September 1781
Ship	State	Description
Friendship	Great Britain	The ship was wrecked on the Falsterbo Reef, in the Baltic Sea. She was on a voyage from Scarborough, Yorkshire to Memel, Prussia.

=== Unknown date ===
List of shipwrecks: Unknown date in September 1781
Ship	State	Description
Admiraal Generaal	Dutch Republic Navy	The third rate ship of the line was driven ashore on Texel.
Betsey	Great Britain	American Revolutionary War: The ship was sunk in the York River, Virginia, United States,
Elizabeth	Ireland	The ship foundered in the Baltic Sea off Møn, Denmark with the loss of all but one of her crew. She was on a voyage from Londonderry to Danzig.
Hinchinbrook	Great Britain	The ship departed from Saint Petersburg for Hull. No further trace, presumed foundered with the loss of all hands.
Nossa Senhora do Carmo St. Domingo	Portugal	The ship was driven ashore and wrecked 8 nautical miles (15 km) north of Copenhagen, Denmark. She was on a voyage from Saint Petersburg, Russia to Lisbon.
Sarah	Great Britain	The ship was driven ashore and wrecked near Dragør, Denmark. She was on a voyage from Saint Petersburg to South Shields, County Durham.
York	Great Britain	The ship was wrecked on the Haisborough Sands, in the North Sea off the coast of Norfolk. She was on a voyage from Saint Petersburg to London.

== October ==
=== 10 October ===
List of shipwrecks: 10 October 1781
Ship	State	Description
HMS Charon	(Kingdom of Great Britain) Royal Navy	American Revolutionary War, Siege of Yorktown: The fifth rate was set of fire and sank in the York River, Virginia, United States.
HMS Fowey	(Kingdom of Great Britain) Royal Navy	American Revolutionary War, Siege of Yorktown: The sixth rate fire ship was scuttled in the York River.
HMS Guadeloupe	(Kingdom of Great Britain) Royal Navy	American Revolutionary War, Siege of Yorktown: The Coventry-class frigate was scuttled in the York River. Subsequently salvaged by the French and entered service with the French Navy.
Port Morant	Great Britain	The ship was lost on the Martin's Industry Sand, off Port Royal, South Carolina, United States. Her crew were rescued.
Shipwright	Great Britain	American Revolutionary War, Siege of Yorktown: The transport burned and sank, along with another transport, in the York River, Virginia, United States, when the anchor line of the burning HMS Charon ( (Kingdom of Great Britain) Royal Navy) parted and she drifted into them.
Unnamed	Great Britain	American Revolutionary War, Siege of Yorktown: The transport burned and sank, along with "Shipwright", in the York River, Virginia, United States, when the anchor line of the burning HMS Charon ( (Kingdom of Great Britain) Royal Navy) parted and she drifted into them.
HMS Vulcan	(Kingdom of Great Britain) Royal Navy	American Revolutionary War, Siege of Yorktown: The fireship was scuttled in the York River.

=== 11 October ===
List of shipwrecks: 11 October 1781
Ship	State	Description
HMS Firebrand	(Kingdom of Great Britain) Royal Navy	The fireship caught fire, exploded and sank at Falmouth, Cornwall. Her crew were rescued.
HMS Rattlesnake	(Kingdom of Great Britain) Royal Navy	The cutter was wrecked at Trindade, Brazil, with the loss of all but one of her crew.

=== 15 October ===
List of shipwrecks: 15 October 1781
Ship	State	Description
Pearl	Denmark	The ship was wrecked on the Goodwin Sands, Kent, Great Britain. Her crew were rescued. She was on a voyage from Saint Croix to Copenhagen.

=== 17 October ===
List of shipwrecks: 17 October 1781
Ship	State	Description
Lord Howe	Great Britain	The storeship foundered in the Atlantic Ocean (45°26′N 41°00′W). Her crew were rescued.

=== 18 October ===
List of shipwrecks: 18 October 1781
Ship	State	Description
Betsey	Great Britain	The ship was lost near "Wingo", Sweden. She was on a voyage from London to Stettin.
Mermaid	Great Britain	The ship was driven ashore and severely damaged in the River Mersey. She was on a voyage from Liverpool, Lancashire to Africa.

=== 24 October ===
List of shipwrecks: 24 October 1781
Ship	State	Description
Boog	Great Britain	The ship foundered in the Atlantic Ocean. Her crew were rescued by Susanna (Great Britain). Boog was on a voyage from Jamaica to London.

=== 29 October ===
List of shipwrecks: 29 October 1781
Ship	State	Description
Peace and Plenty	Ireland	The ship capsized in the Atlantic Ocean with the loss of all but one of her crew. She was on a voyage from Cork to the West Indies.

=== Unknown date ===
List of shipwrecks: Unknown date in October 1781
Ship	State	Description
Fame	Great Britain	The ship was driven ashore on "Cruyso Island". She was on a voyage from Arkhangelsk, Russia to London.
Friendship	Great Britain	The ship was wrecked on the coast of Labrador, British America.
Henrietta	Prussia	The ship was lost neat Ystad, Sweden. She was on a voyage from Memel to Hull, Yorkshire, Great Britain.
Jenny	Great Britain	The ship was in collision with Gibside' (Great Britain and foundered in the North Sea off Flamborough Head, Yorkshire with the loss of three of her crew.
Kent	Great Britain	The ship was driven ashore on the coast of Lincolnshire.
Lamedo	Portugal	The ship foundered. Her crew were rescued by Nossa Senhora das Neves (Portugal). Lamedo was on a voyage from Dover, Kent, Great Britain to Lisbon.
São João Baptista	Portugal	The ship was wrecked near Truro, Cornwall, Great Britain. She was on a voyage from Cork, Ireland to Ostend, Dutch Republic.

== November ==
=== 5 November ===
List of shipwrecks: 5 November 1781
Ship	State	Description
Richard	Great Britain	The ship was lost in Mount's Bay. She was on a voyage from Tinmouth, Devon to Liverpool, Lancashire.
Santissimo Trinidade	Portugal	The ship was lost near St Martin's, Isles of Scilly, Great Britain. Her crew survived. She was on a voyage from Aveiro to Amsterdam, Dutch Republic.

=== 6 November ===
List of shipwrecks: 6 November 1781
Ship	State	Description
Jamaica	Ireland	The ship was driven ashore on the coast of Ireland with the loss of a crew member. She was on a voyage from Sligo to Charles Town, South Carolina, United States.

=== 14 November ===
List of shipwrecks: 14 November 1781
Ship	State	Description
John & Mary	Great Britain	The ship foundered in the Dogger Bank. Her cre were rescued by a fishing vessel.
Rodney	Great Britain	Anglo-French War (1778–83): The ship was driven ashore at Aldeburgh, Suffolk by a French privateer. She was on a voyage from Arkhangelsk, Russia to London.

=== 21 November ===
List of shipwrecks: 21 November 1781
Ship	State	Description
Prince of Orange	Great Britain	The ship foundered. Her crew were rescued by HMS Shark ( (Kingdom of Great Britain) Royal Navy). Prince of Orange was on a voyage from Saint Petersburg, Russia to London.

=== 28 November ===
List of shipwrecks: 28 November 1781
Ship	State	Description
May	Great Britain	The ship was driven ashore on the Island of Condre, in the Saint Lawrence River. She was on a voyage from Quebec to Brazil.
Paisley	Great Britain	The storeship was wrecked at Whitby, Yorkshire. All on board were rescued.

=== Unknown date ===
List of shipwrecks: Unknown date in November 1781
Ship	State	Description
Adventure	Great Britain	The ship was wrecked on rocks at North Shields, County Durham. She was on a voyage from Saint Petersburg, Russia to Portsmouth, Hampshire.
Ann and Frances	Great Britain	The ship was lost on the Isle of Lewis with the loss of two of her crew. She was on a voyage from Whitehaven, Cumberland to a Baltic port.
Antigallician	Great Britain	The ship was driven ashore and wrecked near Holyhead, Anglesey. She was on a voyage from Liverpool, Lancashire to Charles Town, South Carolina, United States.
Blushing Aurora	Great Britain	The ship was driven ashore and wrecked on the coast of Jutland. She was on a voyage from Arkhangelsk, Russia to Liverpool.
Colvil	Great Britain	The ship was lost whilst on a voyage from the Baltic to Scotland.
Count Schimmelman	Denmark	The ship was driven ashore near Ramsgate, Kent, Great Britain. She was on a voyage from Málaga, Spain to London, Great Britain.
Emanuel	Hamburg	The ship ran aground on the Gunfleet Sand, in the North Sea and was severely damaged. She was refloated and taken in to Harwich, Essex, Great Britain for repairs. Emanuel was on a voyage from London to Hamburg.
Felicity	(Kingdom of Great Britain) Jersey	The ship was lost near Libava, Duchy of Courland and Semigallia. She was on a voyage from Saint Petersburg to Jersey.
Friendship	Bremen	The ship was lost in the Weser. She was on a voyage from Bordeaux, France to Bremen.
Friendship	Great Britain	The ship was lost whilst on a voyage from the Baltic to Scotland.
Good Hope	Great Britain	The ship was driven ashore on Texel, Dutch Republic. She was on a voyage from Aberdeen to Ostend, Dutch Republic.
Inga Magdalena	Sweden	The ship was lost near Dungeness, Kent. She was on a voyage from Stockholm to Plymouth, Devon, Great Britain.
Magdalena	Great Britain	The ship foundered in the Baltic Sea. She was on a voyage from Riga, Russia to Hull, Yorkshire.
Maria	Great Britain	Anglo-French War (1778–83): The ship was captured off Fairlee, Isle of Wight by the privateer Jenne Dunkirquoise (Kingdom of France). She was sent in to Dunkirk, France but was lost going into that port. Her crew were rescued.
Marwood	Great Britain	The brig foundered off the coast on Norway with the loss of all but one of her crew.
Mary	Great Britain	The ship was wrecked on the Welsh coast with the loss of four of her crew. She was on a voyage from Jamaica to Bristol, Gloucestershire.
Norfolk	Great Britain	The ship was wrecked on the coast of Norway.
Officeuse	France	The storeship was wrecked at Casamance, Portuguese Guinea. She was on a voyage from Bordeaux to Senegal.
Ranger	Great Britain	The ship was lost in the Gulf of Finland. She was on a voyage from Saint Petersburg to Bristol.
Sally	Great Britain	The ship foundered. Her crew were rescued.
Spitfire	Great Britain	The cutter was lost in Irvine Bay. She was on a voyage from Gothenburg, Sweden to Scotland.
Two Brothers	Dutch Republic	The ship was lost near Ilfracombe, Devon, Great Britain. She was on a voyage from Málaga to Ostend.

== December ==
=== 1 December ===
List of shipwrecks: 1 December 1781
Ship	State	Description
Cyrus	Great Britain	The ship capsized in the River Witham at Boston, Lincolnshire.

=== 3 December ===
List of shipwrecks: 3 December 1781
Ship	State	Description
Jenny	Great Britain	The ship was wrecked on the coast of Cornwall. She was on a voyage from London to Plymouth, Devon.
Seaflower	Great Britain	The ship was abandoned by her crew, who were rescued. She was on a voyage from Riga, Russia to London. Seaflower was later discovered at sea derelict and taken in to "Fredericks Warn".

=== 7 December ===
List of shipwrecks: 7 December 1781
Ship	State	Description
Friendship	Great Britain	The ship was driven ashore at Sandown Castle, Kent. She was on a voyage from Saint Petersburg, Russia to Plymouth, Devon. She was later refloated and taken in to Dover, Kent.
King George	Great Britain	African slave trade: The ship was wrecked on Grand Cayman with the loss of a crew member and 108 of the 429 slaves on board. She was on a voyage from Africa to Jamaica.

=== 17 December ===
List of shipwrecks: 17 December 1781
Ship	State	Description
Æolus	Great Britain	The ship was wrecked on the Haisborough Sands, in the North Sea off the coast of Norfolk. Her crew were rescued by Louisa (Great Britain).

=== 18 December ===
List of shipwrecks: 18 December 1781
Ship	State	Description
Maria	Sweden	The ship was driven ashore and wrecked at Elsinore, Denmark. She was on a voyage from Alicant, Spain to Stockholm.

=== 21 December ===
List of shipwrecks: 21 December 1781
Ship	State	Description
HMS Bellona	(Kingdom of Great Britain) Royal Navy	The Bellona-class ship of the line ran aground off St Helens, Isle of Wight and was severely damaged. She was refloated on 25 December.
Samuel	Great Britain	The ship foundered in the Atlantic Ocean. Her crew were rescued by Olive Branch.

=== 22 December ===
List of shipwrecks: 22 December 1781
Ship	State	Description
Monkey	Great Britain	The cutter was driven ashore at Dunkirk, France. She was captured by the local inhabitants.

=== 25 December ===
List of shipwrecks: 25 December 1781
Ship	State	Description
Casio Jose	Portugal	The ship was wrecked at "Sniem", County Kerry, Ireland Her crew were rescued. She was on a voyage from Lisbon to London, Great Britain.
Phœnix	Great Britain	Anglo-French War (1778–83): The lugger was holed in an engagement with the privateer Fearnought (France) and consequently foundered 3 leagues (9 nautical miles (17 km) off St Ives, Cornwall with the loss of fourteen of her crew.

=== 28 December ===
List of shipwrecks: 28 December 1781
Ship	State	Description
Caterina	Great Britain	The ship was wrecked at Sker Point, Glamorgan. The wreck was looted by local inhabitants, several off whom were arrested and imprisoned. One was later hanged.
Ellen	Great Britain	The ship was driven ashore in Bootle Bay. She was later refloated and taken in to Liverpool, Lancashire. Ellen was on a voyage from Jamaica to Liverpool.
Good-Intent	Great Britain	The ship was driven ashore and wrecked near Bridport, Dorset. She was on a voyage from Falmouth, Cornwall to London.
Solidade	Portugal	The ship was driven ashore and severely damaged in the River Shannon. She was on a voyage from Lisbon, to Waterford, Ireland.

=== 30 December ===
List of shipwrecks: 30 December 1781
Ship	State	Description
Lancaster	Great Britain	The ship was driven ashore near Galway, Ireland. She was on a voyage from Liverpool, Lancashire to Africa.

=== Unknown date ===
List of shipwrecks: Unknown date in December 1781
Ship	State	Description
Anna Maria	Denmark	The ship was driven ashore at Pakefield, Suffolk, Kingdom of Great Britain. She was on a voyage from Ostend, Dutch Republic to Marseille, France.
Balfour	Great Britain	The ship was driven ashore and wrecked on the "Island of Flora" with the loss of eight of her crew. She was on a voyage from Saint Augustine to London.
British Queen	Great Britain	The ship foundered in the Atlantic Ocean. Her crew were rescued by Dick (Great Britain).
Koron (Корон, 'Koroni')	Imperial Russian Navy	The ship was driven aground by ice and sank at Taganrog. Her crew survived. She was refloated in 1782, repaired and returned to service. See also: List of shipwrecks in 1782 § 23 November
Elizabeth	Great Britain	Anglo-French War (1778–83): The ship was captured by a French privateer. She was subsequently driven ashore at Padstow, Cornwall. Elizabeth was on a voyage from Tortola to London.
Fanny	Great Britain	The ship was driven ashore and wrecked in Carnarvon Bay. She was on a voyage from Liverpool, Lancashire to London.
Friends Goodwill	Great Britain	The ship ran aground and was wrecked at Weymouth, Dorset.
Isabella	Great Britain	The ship was lost at the "Lambaska Islands", in the White Sea. She was on a voyage from Arkhangelsk, Russia to Kirkcudbright.
Jong Schettelaen	Dutch Republic	The ship was lost near "Wyburgh". She was on a voyage from Riga, Russia to Ostend.
Josepha	Ireland	The ship foundered in the North Sea with the loss of all but two of her crew. She was on a voyage from Saint Petersburg, Russia to Cork.
Laurel	Great Britain	The ship was driven ashore in the Orkney Islands. She was on a voyage from Saint Petersburg to Whitehaven, Cumberland.
London	Great Britain	The ship was lost at the mouth of the River Bray. She was on a voyage from Liverpool, Lancashire to London.
Neptune	Great Britain	The ship was driven ashore and severely damaged whilst on a voyage from Plymouth to Tinmouth, Devon. She was later refloated.
Swan	Great Britain	The transport ship foundered in the Atlantic Ocean. Her crew took to the boat and were later rescued by Dick (Great Britain).
Taganrog (Таганрог)	Imperial Russian Navy	The ship was driven aground by ice and sank at Taganrog with the loss of 39 of her 123 crew. She was refloated in 1782, repaired and returned to service. See also: List of shipwrecks in 1782 § 25 November
Truelove	Great Britain	The ship was driven ashore on Sanday, Orkney Islands. She was on a voyage from Saint Petersburg to Whitehaven.
Vlieger van Ostend	Dutch Republic	The ship was driven ashore and wrecked in the Ems.

== Unknown date ==
List of shipwrecks: Unknown date in 1781
Ship	State	Description
Africa	Great Britain	The ship sprang a leak in the Atlantic Ocean. Her crew set fire to the vessel and were rescued by Nancy and Trecothick (both Great Britain). Africa was on a voyage from Jamaica to London.
Anna	Great Britain	The ship was lost at "St John's, Augustine".
Alfred	Great Britain	The ship was lost at Jamaica.
Betsy	Great Britain	American Revolutionary War, Siege of Yorktown:The coal brig was scuttled as a blockship sometime during the siege.
Betsey	Great Britain	The ship was sunk by ice off Trinity, Newfoundland, British America. She was on a voyage from Lisbon, Portugal to Trinity.
Betsey	Great Britain	The ship foundered. Her crew were rescued.
Britannia	Great Britain	The victualling ship was lost at Virginia, United States.
Britannia	Great Britain	The ship was lost whilst on a voyage from Charles Town, South Carolina and Georgia to the West Indies.
Brotherly Love	Great Britain	The ship capsized in the Atlantic Ocean with the loss of a passenger. She was on a voyage from Savannah, Georgia, United States to the Leeward Islands.
Carboneir	Portugal	The ship was sunk by ice off the coast of Newfoundland. She was on a voyage from Lisbon to Newfoundland.
Charming Nancy	Great Britain	The ship foundered. Her crew were rescued.
Countess of Effingham	Great Britain	The ship foundered in Trinity Bay, Newfoundland. she was on a voyage from Pool, Dorset to Newfoundland.
Cyrus	Great Britain	The ship foundered. Her crew were rescued by HMS Ruby ( (Kingdom of Great Britain) Royal Navy).
Daniel	Great Britain	The ship was wrecked on the coast of Newfoundland with the loss of 24 of her crew. She was on a voyage from Barbados to Newfoundland.
Debby	Great Britain	The ship was lost at Jamaica.
Deux Frères	Great Britain	The ship capsized in the Mississippi River. She was on a voyage from New Orleans, New Spain to London.
Dispatch	Great Britain	American Revolutionary War: The ship was driven ashore near Charles Town by American privateers and was wrecked. She was on a voyage from Jamaica to Charles Town.
Dispatch	Great Britain	The ship was driven ashore and wrecked near Baltimore, Maryland, British America.
Duke of Cumberland	Great Britain	The ship was lost at Montego Bay, Jamaica. She was on a voyage from Sint Eustatius to Jamaica.
Earl of Cornwallis	Great Britain	The privateer capsized at Saint Kitts whilst being careened with much loss of life.
Earl of Grenville	Great Britain	The ship foundered. Her crew were rescued.
Elizabeth	Great Britain	The ship foundered in the Atlantic Ocean. Sally (Great Britain) rescued the crew. Elizabeth was on a voyage from New York, United States to the West Indies.
Friendship	Great Britain	The ship was wrecked on a reef in the Chesapeake River, United States. Her crew were rescued. She was on a voyage from Charles Town to Virginia.
Gascoyne	Great Britain	The ship foundered in the Atlantic Ocean. She was on a voyage from Jamaica to Liverpool, Lancashire.
General Clinton	Great Britain	The ship foundered in the Atlantic Ocean. Her crew were rescued.
General Prevost	Great Britain	American Revolutionary War: The ship was engaged by an American brig, cutter and frigate. She was driven ashore and wrecked on the north coast of Cuba.
Industry	Great Britain	The ship was lost in the West Indies. She was on a voyage from Saint Thomas, Virgin Islands to Halifax.
Jamaica	Great Britain	The ship capsized at Charles Town.
June	Great Britain	The ship was lost in the Straits of Belle Isle. She was on a voyage from London to Quebec.
Lark	Ireland	The ship foundered in the Atlantic Ocean. She was on a voyage from Cork to New York.
Leeds Industry	Great Britain	The transport ship was lost at Charles Town.
Lively	United States	The schooner foundered in the Atlantic Ocean off Montauk, New York.
Lord Frederick	Great Britain	The ship was captured by an American privateer. The British recaptured her but she was subsequently wrecked at Bermuda. Lord Frederick was on a voyage from the Clyde to Charles Town.
Loyal Briton	Great Britain	The ship foundered in the Atlantic Ocean. She was on a voyage from Bristol to New York.
Madonna del Rosario	Grand Duchy of Tuscany	The ship foundered off Rhodes. She was on a voyage from Scanderoon, Ottoman Empire to Livorno.
Nancy	Great Britain	The ship foundered in the Atlantic Ocean. Fly (Great Britain) rescued the crew. Nancy was on a voyage from New York to Lisbon, Portugal.
Nancy	Great Britain	The ship foundered in the Atlantic Ocean. Her crew were rescued She was on a voyage from Jamaica to London.
Philippa	Great Britain	American Revolutionary War: The ship was captured by an American privateer but was subsequently lost. She was on a voyage from Porto, Portugal to New York.
Richmond	Great Britain	The ship foundered in the Atlantic Ocean whilst bound for Charles Town.
Rodney	Great Britain	The ship foundered in the Atlantic Ocean. She was on a voyage from Jamaica to London.
Rosa	Great Britain	The ship was lost near "Town Cordowan". She was on a voyage from "Port Passage" to the West Indies.
Sir Peter Parker	Great Britain	The ship was lost at Jamaica. She was on a voyage from Pensacola, Florida, British America to Jamaica.
Speedwell	Great Britain	The ship was sunk by ice off Trinity, Newfoundland. She was on a voyage from Lisbon to Trinity.
Speke	Great Britain	The transport ship was presumed to have foundered whilst on a voyage from the West Indies to Great Britain.
St. Stephen	Great Britain	The transport ship foundered in the Atlantic Ocean. Her crew were rescued.
Swallow	Great Britain	The ship was lost at Tortola before 22 June. Her crew were rescued.
Thetis	Great Britain	The ship foundered in the Atlantic Ocean. Laing (Great Britain) rescued the crew. Thetis was on a voyage from Jamaica to London.
Trecothick	Great Britain	The ship sprang a leak in the Atlantic Ocean. Her crew set fire to her and abandoned ship. They were rescued.
Venus	Great Britain	The ship was lost off Cape Ray, Newfoundland.
