= List of shipwrecks in 1782 =

The List of shipwrecks in 1782 includes some ships sunk, wrecked or otherwise lost during 1782.

table of contents
1782
Jan	Feb	Mar	Apr
May	Jun	Jul	Aug
Sep	Oct	Nov	Dec
Unknown date

== January ==
=== 5 January ===
List of shipwrecks: 5 January 1782
Ship	State	Description
Fly	France	The privateer was driven ashore and wrecked near Boulogne with the loss of 55 of the 61 people on board.
Isabella	Great Britain	The ship was driven ashore and damaged at Cobh, County Cork, Ireland. She was on a voyage from Liverpool to Saint Lucia.

=== 7 January ===
List of shipwrecks: 7 January 1782
Ship	State	Description
Wolle Commisée	France	The ship was wrecked at Barnstaple, Devon, Great Britain.

=== 9 January ===
List of shipwrecks: 9 January 1782
Ship	State	Description
Catharine	Great Britain	The sloop was driven ashore and wrecked on the south coast of the Isle of Wight. Her crew were rescued. She was on a voyage from Penzance, Cornwall to London.

=== 13 January ===
List of shipwrecks: 13 January 1782
Ship	State	Description
Joseph	Great Britain	The ship foundered. Her crew were rescued by Juno (Great Britain).

=== 17 January ===
List of shipwrecks: 17 January 1782
Ship	State	Description
Will	Great Britain	The ship was lost in Carnarvon Bay with the loss of six of her crew. She was on a voyage from Saint Lucia to Liverpool, Lancashire.

=== 18 January ===
List of shipwrecks: 18 January 1782
Ship	State	Description
James	Great Britain	The full-rigged ship was wrecked in the River Shannon.

=== 20 January ===
List of shipwrecks: 20 January 1782
Ship	State	Description
HMS Hinchinbrook	(Kingdom of Great Britain) Royal Navy	The sixth-rate frigate ran aground and sank in St. Anne's Bay, Jamaica. Her crew were rescued.

=== 21 January ===
List of shipwrecks: 21 January 1782
Ship	State	Description
HMS Blonde	(Kingdom of Great Britain) Royal Navy	The fifth-rate frigate was wrecked off Seal Island, Nova Scotia, British North America. The crew and their American prisoners were rescued by the privateers Lively and Scammell (both United States). They were landed 30 miles (48 km) from Yarmouth, Nova Scotia in exchange for the release of the Americans.

=== 23 January ===
List of shipwrecks: 23 January 1782
Ship	State	Description
Friendship	Great Britain	The ship was lost in Carmarthen Bay. Her crew were rescued.
Splitwiskers	Great Britain	The ship was lost near Ostend, Dutch Republic. She was on a voyage from Plymouth, Devon to Ostend.

=== 25 January ===
List of shipwrecks: 25 January 1782
Ship	State	Description
HMS Solebay	(Kingdom of Great Britain) Royal Navy	The Mermaid-class frigate was wrecked off Nevis.

=== 30 January ===
List of shipwrecks: 30 January 1782
Ship	State	Description
Dankbaarheid	Dutch East India Company ship, captured by (Kingdom of Great Britain) Royal Navy	Loss of the Dankbaarheyt The East Indiaman, a prize of HMS Romney ( (Kingdom of Great Britain) Royal Navy), foundered in the English Channel. She had been captured following the Battle of Saldanha Bay on 21 July 1781. Dankbaarheit had been on a voyage from Bengal, Dutch India to Rotterdam.
Honkoop	Dutch East India Company ship, captured by (Kingdom of Great Britain) Royal Navy	The East Indiaman, a prize of ( (Kingdom of Great Britain) Royal Navy), lost as the result of a gale in the Indian Ocean and believed to have foundered with all hands.

=== Unknown date ===
List of shipwrecks: Unknown date in January 1782
Ship	State	Description
Alexander	Dutch Republic	The ship ran aground off Pool, Dorset, Great Britain. She was on a voyage from Pool to Ostend.
Baltimore	Great Britain	The ship was driven ashore and wrecked at Ostend. She was on a voyage from London to Ostend.
Betsey	Great Britain	The ship was lost at the Calf of Man, Isle of Man. She was on a voyage from Dublin, Ireland to Liverpool, Lancashire.
Catharina	Grand Duchy of Tuscany	The ship was lost in the Bristol Channel. She was on a voyage from Livorno to Ostend.
Commerce	Great Britain	The ship was driven ashore in Galway Bay. She was on a voyage from Liverpool to the West Indies.
Diligente	French Navy	The frigate was wrecked at Cape Henry, Virginia, United States
Eagle	Great Britain	The transport ship was destroyed by fire at Dartmouth, Devon.
Elizabeth	Great Britain	The ship was lost near Uphill, Somerset with the loss of 30 lives.
Fortuna	Great Britain	The ship was destroyed by fire whilst on a voyage from Gothenburg to Leith, Lothian, Great Britain.
Frederick Wilhelm	Prussia	The ship was lost on the coast of Jutland. She was on a voyage from Memel to Liverpool.
Gordon	Great Britain	The ship was in collision with HMS Jamaica ( (Kingdom of Great Britain) Royal Navy). She was beached near Sandown Castle, Kent in a severely damaged condition and was consequently declared a total loss. She was on a voyage from London to Antigua. Gordon was refloated on 14 February and taken in to Ramsgate, Kent.
Industry	Great Britain	The ship was lost near Kullen, Sweden. She was on a voyage from Hull, Yorkshire to Köngsberg, Prussia.
Isabella	Great Britain	The ship was driven ashore near Lowestoft, Suffolk.
James	Great Britain	The ship was driven ashore near Lowestoft.
James	Great Britain	The transport ship struck rocks and sank in the Bay of Kilmier, Ireland. Her crew survived.
Johan	Stettin	The ship foundered in the North Sea. Her crew were rescued. She was on a voyage from London to Stettin.
Madona del Rosario e St. Antonio de Padova e Stella Delle Mare	Grand Duchy of Tuscany	The ship was lost in the Bristol Channel. She was on a voyage from Livorno to London.
Pomona	Great Britain	The ship was lost near Biddiford, Devon. She was on a voyage from Whitehaven, Cumberland to London and had been captured and recaptured twice.
Rhoda	Great Britain	The ship was driven ashore and wrecked near Lowestoft.
Sally	Great Britain	Anglo-French War (1778–83): The ship was captured by Anti-Briton (France). She was subsequently driven ashore and wrecked near Barnstaple, Devon.
Santo Jesus do Bonfim	Portugal	The ship was driven ashore near Maryport, Cumberland. She was on a voyage from Lisbon to Havre de Grâce, France.
Santa Rota	Portugal	The ship was driven ashore near Waterford, Ireland. She was on a voyage from Porto to Cork, Ireland.
Saulnier	Great Britain	The ship was wrecked on the Welsh coast. She was on a voyage from Falmouth, Cornwall to Wales.
Sophia Alertina	Spain	The brig was driven ashore at Sandwich, Kent, Great Britain. She was on a voyage from Seville to London.
St Anna Nossa Senhora Bom Successo	Portugal	The ship was driven ashore and wrecked near Chichester, Sussex, Great Britain. She was on a voyage from Lisbon to London.
Swallow	Great Britain	The collier foundered in the North Sea off Lowestoft. Four of her crew survived.
Tempest	United States	The privateer sank in the Gulf Stream in a gale. All 40 crew were killed.
Three Sisters	Russia	The ship was wrecked at the Calf of Man, Isle of Man. She was on a voyage from Liverpool to Ostend, Dutch Republic.
Triton	Great Britain	The ship was driven ashore at Ostend. She was on a voyage from Plymouth to Ostend.
Two Brothers	Great Britain	The ship, a cartel, was driven ashore and wrecked at Plymouth. She was on a voyage from Plymouth to a French port.
Walfisch	Prussia	The ship was lost near Kullen. She was on a voyage from Hull to Königsberg.

== February ==
=== 10 February ===
List of shipwrecks: 10 February 1782
Ship	State	Description
Greyhound	Great Britain	The ship was driven ashore and wrecked east of Plymouth, Devon. She was on a voyage from Mogadore, Morocco to London.

=== 11 February ===
List of shipwrecks: 11 February 1782
Ship	State	Description
Friendship	Great Britain	The ship was lost at Orford, Suffolk. She was on a voyage from Montrose, Forfarshire to London.

=== 19 February ===
List of shipwrecks: 19 February 1782
Ship	State	Description
Aurora, Burke, and Venus	All Great Britain	The ships were lost on Barbuda whilst engaged with Active (Great Britain), which they mistook for an enemy vessel. Active exploded and sank whilst engaging one of her attackers. There were eighteen survivors from her crew of about 50.

=== 20 February ===
List of shipwrecks: 20 February 1782
Ship	State	Description
Richard	Great Britain	The ship was lost at Slyne Head, County Galway, Ireland. She was on a voyage from Jamaica to Liverpool, Lancashire.

=== 28 February ===
List of shipwrecks: 28 February 1782
Ship	State	Description
Industry	Great Britain	The full-rigged ship was driven ashore and wrecked at Liscannor, County Clare, Ireland. She was on a voyage from Jamaica to London.

=== Unknown date ===
List of shipwrecks: Unknown date in February 1782
Ship	State	Description
Carolina	Dutch Republic	The ship was wrecked at Bude, Cornwall with the loss of all but one of her crew. She was on a voyage from Dublin, Ireland to Ostend.
Cronberg	(Denmark) Danish Asiatic Company	The East Indiaman departed from Copenhagen for Madeira and the East Indies. No further trace, presumed foundered with the loss of all hands.
Endeavour	Great Britain	The ship was wrecked on St Ninian's Isle, Shetland Islands with the loss of nine of her fourteen crew. She was on a voyage from Danzig to Liverpool, Lancashire.
Hannah	Great Britain	The ship ran aground on the Hoyle Bank, in Liverpool Bay.
Jesus and Joseph	Portugal	The ship was lost near Castro. She was on a voyage from London to Lisbon.
Lusitania	Great Britain	The ship was wrecked on Margate, Kent. She was on a voyage from Lisbon to Ostend and London.
Nossa Senhora do Carmo	Portugal	The ship was driven ashore and wrecked on the coast of Cornwall. She was on a voyage from Dublin to Porto.
Nossa Senhora da Conceição	Portugal	The ship was driven ashore and wrecked at Appledore, Devon, Great Britain. Her crew were rescued. She was on a voyage from Lisbon to Cork, Ireland.
Prince Frederick	Denmark	The ship foundered off Margate, Kent, Great Britain. She was on a voyage from Copenhagen to the West Indies.
Speedwell	Great Britain	The ship was sunk by ice in Steenden Bay, Denmark with the loss of her captain. She was on a voyage from Danzig to Aberdeen.
Tyne	Great Britain	The ship was lost on the West coast of Ireland.
William	Great Britain	The ship was lost in the Bristol Channel. She was on a voyage from Portreath, Cornwall to Bristol, Gloucestershire.

== March ==
=== 3 March ===
List of shipwrecks: 3 March 1782
Ship	State	Description
Vrow Anna Maria	Prussia	The ship was driven ashore and wrecked at Bangor, County Down, Ireland. She was on a voyage from Königsberg to Londonderry, Ireland.

=== 4 March ===
List of shipwrecks: 4 March 1782
Ship	State	Description
Two Brothers	Great Britain	The ship was wrecked at Barnstaple, Devon.

=== 5 March ===
List of shipwrecks: 5 March 1782
Ship	State	Description
Lively	Great Britain	The ship was wrecked at Irvine, Ayrshire with the loss of all hands. She was on a voyage from Waterford, Ireland to the Clyde.

=== 7 March ===
List of shipwrecks: 7 March 1782
Ship	State	Description
Fanny	Great Britain	The ship was driven ashore north of Cape Florida, British America and wrecked. Her crew were rescued. She was on a voyage from Jamaica to Liverpool, Lancashire.

=== 8 March ===
List of shipwrecks: 8 March 1782
Ship	State	Description
Jenny	Great Britain	The brig was in collision with Providence (Great Britain) and was consequently beached at Sharp Point, Isle of Wight.
Success	Great Britain	The ship was driven ashore and wrecked at Ramsgate, Kent. She was on a voyage from London to Plymouth, Devon.

=== 9 March ===
List of shipwrecks: 9 March 1782
Ship	State	Description
Stadt Antwerpen	Dutch Republic	The ship departed from Margate, Kent, Great Britain for Amsterdam and Emden. No further trace, presumed foundered in the North Sea with the loss of all hands.

=== 11 March ===
List of shipwrecks: 11 March 1782
Ship	State	Description
Sophia Magdalena	Sweden	The ship was wrecked on Scroby Sands, Norfolk, Great Britain. Her crew were rescued. She was on a voyage from London to Newcastle upon Tyne, Northumberland.

=== 12 March ===
List of shipwrecks: 12 March 1782
Ship	State	Description
Commerce	Great Britain	The ship foundered in the Atlantic Ocean (40°00′N 27°30′W). Her crew were rescued by Mermaid (Great Britain). Commerce was on a voyage from Lisbon, Portugal to Newfoundland, British America.
Hopewell	Great Britain	The transport ship was driven ashore and wrecked near Boulogne, France. Her crew were rescued.

=== 13 March ===
List of shipwrecks: 13 March 1782
Ship	State	Description
Juffrow Henrietta	Dutch Republic	The ship was driven ashore and wrecked on Goree with the loss of four of her crew. She was on a voyage from Ostend to Rotterdam.

=== 22 March ===
List of shipwrecks: 22 March 1782
Ship	State	Description
Amelia	Great Britain	The ship was wrecked on the Goodwin Sands, Kent. Her crew were rescued. She was on a voyage from Amsterdam, Dutch Republic to Bordeaux, France.

=== 23 March ===
List of shipwrecks: 23 March 1782
Ship	State	Description
Jenny	Great Britain	The ship was driven ashore and wrecked on Anglesey. She was on a voyage from Liverpool, Lancashire to Dundalk, County Louth, Ireland.
Princess Louisa	Denmark	The ship was sunk by ice in the Kattegat. Her crew were rescued. She was on a voyage from Copenhagen to Saint Croix.

=== 27 March ===
List of shipwrecks: 27 March 1782
Ship	State	Description
Emmet	Great Britain	The ship was driven ashore and wrecked at Skagen, Denmark. Her crew were rescued. She was on a voyage from Newcastle upon Tyne, Northumberland to Gothenburg, Sweden.

=== 28 March ===
List of shipwrecks: 28 March 1782
Ship	State	Description
Rigernes Onske	(Denmark) Danish Asiatic Company	The East Indiaman was driven ashore in the Øresund.

=== 29 March ===
List of shipwrecks: 29 March 1782
Ship	State	Description
Anna Rebecca	Dutch Republic	The ship was driven ashore at the east end of the Isle of Wight, Great Britain. She was on a voyage from Ostend to Cádiz, Spain.

=== 30 March ===
List of shipwrecks: 30 March 1782
Ship	State	Description
Maria Elizabeth	Hamburg	The ship was wrecked at Plymouth, Devon, Great Britain. Her crew were rescued. She was on a voyage from Málaga, Spain to Hamburg.
Tortington	Great Britain	The ship was wrecked at Plymouth with the loss of a crew member. She was on a voyage from Porto, Portugal to Plymouth.

=== Unknown date ===
List of shipwrecks: Unknown date in March 1782
Ship	State	Description
Active	Great Britain	The ship was driven ashore east of Ostend, Dutch Republic. She was on a voyage from Great Yarmouth, Norfolk to Cowes, Isle of Wight.
Admiral Keppel	Great Britain	The transport ship was driven ashore near Calais, France.
Carolina Matilda	Dutch Republic	The ship sank at Ostend. She was on a voyage from Ostend to Nantes, France.
Catharine	Great Britain	The ship, a prize of La Madame (France), was driven ashore and wrecked near Ouessant, France.
Chepstow	Great Britain	The ship foundered whilst on a voyage from Porto, Portugal to Chepstow, Monmouthshire.
Drie Gebroeders	Dutch Republic	The ship was driven ashore and wrecked at Folkestone, Kent, Great Britain. She was on a voyage from Ostend to Saint-Valery-sur-Somme, France.
Elizabeth	Great Britain	The ship was lost near Brest, France. Her crew were rescued.
Elizabeth	Great Britain	The ship foundered in the English Channel off Portland, Dorset. She was on a voyage from Limerick, Ireland to Cowes.
Emmanuel	Denmark	The ship foundered in the North Sea off Great Yarmouth before 28 March. She was on a voyage from "Fredericksmald" to Great Yarmouth.
Esdale	Great Britain	The ship foundered whilst on a voyage from Porto to London.
Falmouth	Great Britain	The ship was driven ashore near Blankenberge, Dutch Republic. She was on a voyage from Saint Petersburg, Russia to Falmouth, Cornwall.
Frederick	Great Britain	The ship departed from Lancaster, Lancashire for the West Indies. No further trace, presumed foundered with the loss of all hands.
Friends Goodwill	Great Britain	The ship was wrecked on the French coast. She was on a voyage from Portsmouth, Hampshire to London.
Goede Vrienden	Dutch Republic	The ship was driven ashore near Wexford, Ireland. She was on a voyage from Ostend to Newry, County Antrim, Ireland.
Good Intent	Great Britain	The ship was driven ashore near Calais. She was on a voyage from Bristol, Gloucestershire to London.
Good Samaritan	Great Britain	The ship was driven ashore on the coast on Normandy, France. She was on a voyage from Ostend to Guernsey, Channel Islands.
Henley	Great Britain	The transport ship foundered in the English Channel.
Hercules	Great Britain	The ship foundered in the Atlantic Ocean. She was on a voyage from Cork, Ireland to Antigua.
Highland	Great Britain	The transport ship foundered off the coast of France. Her crew were rescued.
Hoppet	(Denmark) Norway	The ship foundered in the North Sea off North Foreland, Kent. She was on a voyage from Norway to London.
Industry	Great Britain	The ship was lost near Down Patrick, County Down, Ireland. She was on a voyage from Bristol to Londonderry.
Johannas	Denmark	The ship was wrecked on the Goodwin Sands, Kent before 28 March. She was on a voyage from Ostend to an African port.
Johannes	Denmark	The ship capsized and was driven ashore on the Norwegian coast. She was on a voyage from London, Great Britain to Elsinore.
John	Great Britain	The ship foundered in the Atlantic Ocean. She was on a voyage from Lisbon, Portugal to Newfoundland, British America.
John and Mary	Great Britain	The ship was lost on the Nore. Her crew were rescued. She was on a voyage from Pool to London.
Jufrow Thriesa	Dutch Republic	The ship was driven ashore and wrecked at San Sebastián, Spain. She was on a voyage from Ostend to San Sebastián.
London	Great Britain	The ship was reported missing on a voyage from Porto to London.
Loven	Ireland	The ship was driven ashore near Chichester, Sussex. She was on a voyage from Ostend to Sligo.
Nelly	Great Britain	The ship was driven ashore and wrecked at Sheerness, Kent. She was on a voyage from Ostend to London.
Peggy	Great Britain	Fourth Anglo-Dutch War: The ship was driven ashore at Dymchurch, Kent by two Dutch privateers. She was on a voyage from London to Portsmouth.
Sandy Point	Great Britain	The ship sank at St. Andero, Spain.
Schelde	Dutch Republic	The ship foundered in the North Sea with the loss of all but four of her crew. She was on a voyage from Ostend to the Charente, France.
Shrewsbury	Great Britain	The stores ship was driven ashore and wrecked at Cowes.
St Eloy	France	The ship was wrecked on the coast of Brittany. She was on a voyage from Ostend to the Île d'Yeu.
St John Baptist	Portugal	The ship was driven ashore and wrecked at Killough, County Down. She was on a voyage from Porto to Dublin, Ireland.
Theresa	Great Britain	The ship foundered in the Bay of Biscay off the mouth of the Loire. She was on a voyage from Pool to Lisbon.
Thomas & Matthew	Great Britain	The ship was wrecked on the Nore. She was on a voyage from Weymouth, Dorset to London.
Three Friends	Great Britain	The ship was driven ashore near Calais. She was on a voyage from Bristol to London.
Venus	Great Britain	The ship was wrecked on the French coast. She was on a voyage from Kincardine to Ostend.
Young Jacob	Dutch Republic	The ship was wrecked at Mogadore, Morocco. Her crew were rescued. She was on a voyage from Ostend to Mogadore.

== April ==
=== 1 April ===
List of shipwrecks: 1 April 1782
Ship	State	Description
HMS Santa Monica	(Kingdom of Great Britain) Royal Navy	The sixth rate frigate was wrecked on Tortola with the loss of a crew member.
Three Phillises	Republic of Genoa	The ship was driven ashore near Sandown Castle, Kent, Great Britain. Her crew were rescued. She was on a voyage from Genoa to Ostend, Dutch Republic.

=== 8 April ===
List of shipwrecks: 8 April 1782
Ship	State	Description
Pomona	Great Britain	The ship was wrecked at Clovelly, Devon.

=== 12 April ===
List of shipwrecks: 12 April 1782
Ship	State	Description
César	French Navy	César. American Revolutionary War, Battle of the Saintes: The César-class ship of the line exploded and sank with the loss of about 450 lives.
Hetnelveron	Dutch Republic	The ship foundered in the North Sea off the coast of Norfolk, Great Britain with the loss of all hands.

=== 20 April ===
List of shipwrecks: 20 April 1782
Ship	State	Description
Bernstoff	Great Britain	The ship was lost at Bombay, India.
Cudalore	Great Britain	The armed grabb was lost at Bombay.

=== 24 April ===
List of shipwrecks: 24 April 1782
Ship	State	Description
Industry	Great Britain	The ship was driven ashore and wrecked at Whitby, Yorkshire. Her crew were rescued. She was on a voyage from Newcastle upon Tyne, Northumberland to King's Lynn, Norfolk.

=== 28 April ===
List of shipwrecks: 28 April 1782
Ship	State	Description
Benjamin and Ann	Great Britain	The transport ship was driven ashore and wrecked at Corton, Suffolk. Her crew were rescued.
Peter	Ireland	The ship was wrecked at Beerhaven, County Cork. She was on a voyage from Cork to Jamaica.

=== Unknown date ===
List of shipwrecks: Unknown date in April 1782
Ship	State	Description
Bourdeaux	Ireland	The yacht was wrecked on the French coast. She was on a voyage from Cork to Bordeaux, France.
Edward & Mary	Great Britain	The ship was driven ashore at Dublin, Ireland. She was on a voyage from Dublin to Weymouth, Dorset.
Expédition	French Navy	The corvette was run aground between Karaikal and Tharangambadi, India to avoid capture by the Royal Navy.
Laurel	Dutch Republic	The ship sank at Ostend. She was on a voyage from Marseille, France to Ostend.
Minerea	Great Britain	The ship was driven ashore and wrecked at North Shields, County Durham.
Patty	Ireland	The ship was wrecked in Tramore Bay. She was on a voyage from Cork to Newfoundland, British America.
Tertius	Great Britain	The ship ran aground at Naples, Kingdom of Sicily. She was on a voyage from Exon, Devon to Naples.
Three Sisters	Great Britain	The ship was wrecked on the Goodwin Sands, Kent. Her crew were rescued. She was on a voyage from Dunkirk, France to Bordeaux.
Trusty	Great Britain	The ship was wrecked on the Irish coast. She was on a voyage from Swansey, Glamorgan to Dublin.
Venus	Great Britain	The ship was lost on the Welsh coast. She was on a voyage from Bristol, Gloucestershire to Belfast, County Antrim, Ireland.

== May ==
=== 5 May ===
List of shipwrecks: 5 May 1782
Ship	State	Description
Good-Design	Great Britain	The ship was in collision with another vessel and foundered in the North Sea off Great Yarmouth, Norfolk. Her crew were rescued.

=== 18 May ===
List of shipwrecks: 18 May 1782
Ship	State	Description
Lowther and Senhouse	Great Britain	Anglo-French War (1778–83): The ship was captured by the privateer Vanqueur (France) on 10 May. She was driven ashore and wrecked 8 nautical miles (15 km) north of Truro, Cornwall. Lowther and Senhouse had been on a voyage from Liverpool, Lancashire to Cork, Ireland

=== 20 May ===
List of shipwrecks: 20 May 1782
Ship	State	Description
Prudence	Great Britain	The transport ship was lost near Tellicherry, India. Prudence and Union were ordnance store ships and a storm wrecked them on Cotta Point.
Union	Great Britain	The transport ship was lost near Tellicherry. Union and Prudence were ordnance store ships and a storm wrecked them on Cotta Point

=== 21 May ===
List of shipwrecks: 21 May 1782
Ship	State	Description
Union	Great Britain	The ship foundered in the English Channel off Dungeness, Kent. Her crew were rescued. She was on a voyage from Falmouth, Cornwall to Dover, Kent.

=== 27 May ===
List of shipwrecks: 27 May 1782
Ship	State	Description
Sally	Great Britain	The ship was wrecked at Barnstaple, Devon.

=== 30 May ===
List of shipwrecks: 30 May 1782
Ship	State	Description
Enterprize	Great Britain	The ship was wrecked on the Brazen Rock, in the Atlantic Ocean off Cape Cornwall. Her crew survived. She was on a voyage from Cork, Ireland to Portsmouth, Hampshire.

=== Unknown date ===
List of shipwrecks: Unknown date in May 1782
Ship	State	Description
Esperance	Prussia	The ship foundered in the Baltic Sea. She was on a voyage from Königsberg to Harwich, Essex, Great Britain.
Jane	Great Britain	The ship foundered off the coast of Ireland.
Lion	Great Britain	The ship was wrecked at Baltimore, County Cork, Ireland. All on board were rescued.
Pilhead	Great Britain	The ship struck a rock and was severely damaged in the Isles of Scilly. She was on a voyage from Plymouth, Devon to Bristol, Gloucestershire.
Union	Great Britain	The transport ship was driven ashore at Chichester, Sussex.
Venus	Great Britain	The ship was wrecked at Penzance, Cornwall. Her crew were rescued. She was on a voyage from Cork, Ireland to London.

== June ==
=== 4 June ===
List of shipwrecks: 4 June 1782
Ship	State	Description
Dundee	Great Britain	The whaler was sunk by ice off the coast of Greenland. Her crew survived.

=== 9 June ===
List of shipwrecks: 9 June 1782
Ship	State	Description
Concord	Great Britain	The ship was driven ashore and wrecked at Plymouth, Devon.

=== 14 June ===
List of shipwrecks: 14 June 1782
Ship	State	Description
Two Friends	Great Britain	The brig was driven ashore and wrecked 10 nautical miles (19 km) west of Portland, Dorset. Her crew were rescued. She was on a voyage from "Sutree" to Emden, Electorate of Hanover.

=== 18 June ===
List of shipwrecks: 18 June 1782
Ship	State	Description
Felicity	Ireland	The ship was lost in Dungarvan Bay. She was on a voyage from Newry, County Antrim to Cork and the West Indies.

=== 21 June ===
List of shipwrecks: 21 June 1782
Ship	State	Description
Mersey	Great Britain	The ship was destroyed by fire at Jamaica.

=== 24 June ===
List of shipwrecks: 24 June 1782
Ship	State	Description
Major	British East India Company	The East Indiaman was destroyed by fire off Culpee, India.

=== Unknown date ===
List of shipwrecks: Unknown date in June 1782
Ship	State	Description
Fame	Great Britain	The ship was wrecked on Öland, Sweden. She was on a voyage from Reval, Russia to Whitehaven, Cumberland.
Jannet	Great Britain	Anglo-French War (1778–83): The ship was captured and sunk by a French privateer. She was on a voyage from Liverpool, Lancashire to Limerick or Cork, Ireland.
John	Great Britain	The ship was wrecked in Cardigan Bay. She was on a voyage from Liverpool to Plymouth, Devon.
Prince of Wales	Great Britain	The ship was wrecked on rocks off Land's End, Cornwall. Her crew were rescued. She was on a voyage from Cork to Portsmouth, Hampshire.

== July ==
=== 2 July ===
List of shipwrecks: 2 July 1782
Ship	State	Description
Unnamed	Great Britain	American Revolutionary War:The privateer was destroyed at Sandy Hook.

=== 5 July ===
List of shipwrecks: 5 July 1782
Ship	State	Description
Friendship	Great Britain	The ship was captured and burnt by a privateer. She was on a voyage from Hull, Yorkshire to Saint Petersburg, Russia.

=== 17 July ===
List of shipwrecks: 17 July 1782
Ship	State	Description
William & James	Great Britain	Anglo-French War (1778–83): The ship was captured and burnt off Waterford, Ireland by the privateer Sophia (France). She was on a voyage from Liverpool, Lancashire to New York, United States.

=== 25 July ===
List of shipwrecks: 25 July 1782
Ship	State	Description
Brutus	Great Britain	The ship departed from the Gambia for London. No further trace, presumed foundered in the Atlantic Ocean with the loss of all hands.

=== Unknown date ===
List of shipwrecks: Unknown date in July 1782
Ship	State	Description
Bienfaisant	France	The ship, a prize of HMS Cerberus ( (Kingdom of Great Britain) Royal Navy), was driven ashore at Marazion, Cornwall, Great Britain. She was on a voyage from Martinique to Brest, France.
Brayton	Great Britain	The ship was driven ashore and wrecked on the Isle of Lewis. She was on a voyage from Whitehaven to a Baltic port.
Charles	Great Britain	The ship was driven ashore and wrecked at Liverpool, Lancashire. She was on a voyage from Jamaica to Liverpool.
Dove	Great Britain	Anglo-French War (1778–83): The ship was captured and burnt off Dublin, Ireland by the privateer Sophia (France). She was on a voyage from Biddiford, Devon to Cork, Ireland.
Emperor	Great Britain	The ship was driven ashore and wrecked near Margate, Kent. She was on a voyage from Jamaica to London.
Gracioza Annetta	Republic of Venice	The ship was driven ashore and wrecked in the Thames Estuary. She was on a voyage from Zant to London, Great Britain.
Major	Great Britain	The ship was driven ashore and wrecked at Liverpool. She was on a voyage from Jamaica to Liverpool.
Neptune	Denmark	The ship was driven ashore at Marazion. She was on a voyage from Dominica to Sint Eustatius and Ostend, Dutch Republic.
St Anna	Portugal	The ship was driven ashore and wrecked near Falmouth, Cornwall, Great Britain with the loss of most of her crew. She was on a voyage from Porto to Guernsey, Channel Islands.
Success	Great Britain	Fourth Anglo-Dutch War: The ship was captured and burnt by a Dutch privateer. She was on a voyage from Arundel, Sussex to Plymouth, Devon and Waterford, Ireland.
Tyne	Great Britain	The ship was driven ashore and wrecked near "Wigan", Sweden. She was on a voyage from Liverpool to a Baltic port.

== August ==
=== 4 August ===
List of shipwrecks: 4 August 1782
Ship	State	Description
Grosvenor	British East India Company	Grosvenor. The East Indiaman was wrecked on the coast of Pondoland, Africa, with the loss of eighteen on the 141 people on board. Of the 123 survivors, 105 were subsequently killed by Bantu tribesmen.

=== 12 August ===
List of shipwrecks: 12 August 1782
Ship	State	Description
Dorothy and Alice	Great Britain	The ship was driven ashore at Deal, Kent.
Hopewell	Great Britain	The ship was driven ashore and severely damaged at Deal.
Success	Great Britain	The ship was driven ashore and wrecked at Deal.

=== 13 August ===
List of shipwrecks: 13 August 1782
Ship	State	Description
Providentia Divina	France	The ship was wrecked in the Isles of Scilly, Great Britain with the loss of two of her crew. She was on a voyage from Marseille to Ostend, Dutch Republic.

=== 15 August ===
List of shipwrecks: 15 August 1782
Ship	State	Description
Magnifique	French Navy	The Magnifique-class ship of the line ran aground and was wrecked on a sandbar off Lovells Island in Boston Harbor off the coast of Massachusetts, United States.

=== 24 August ===
List of shipwrecks: 24 August 1782
Ship	State	Description
Alexander	Great Britain	The ship was driven ashore at Isle Varow Point, in the River Shannon.
Cotton Planter	Great Britain	The ship was driven ashore at Isle Varow Point.
Kammer Herre Inden	Denmark	The ship sprang a leak and was beached the next day on Crab Island. All on board survived but the ship was declared a total loss. She was on a voyaged from Saint Croix to Copenhagen.
Peggy	Great Britain	The ship was driven ashore at Isle Varow Point.

=== 28 August ===
List of shipwrecks: 28 August 1782
Ship	State	Description
Brilliant	British East India Company	The East Indiaman struck a rock and foundered off Johanna, Comoros Islands.

=== 29 August ===
List of shipwrecks: 29 August 1782
Ship	State	Description
Endeavour	Great Britain	The ship foundered off the Western Islands. Fourteen crew were rescued by Albion (Great Britain). Endeavour was on a voyage from Saint Lucia to London.
HMS Royal George	(Kingdom of Great Britain) Royal Navy	HMS Royal George. The first-rate ship of the line capsized and sank in the Solent with the loss of around 900 lives. There were 255 survivors.

=== Unknown date ===
List of shipwrecks: Unknown date in August 1782
Ship	State	Description
Copenhagen	Denmark	The ship was wrecked on the coast of Scotland. She was on a voyage from Saint Croix to Copenhagen.
Cornwall	Great Britain	The ship ran aground at Bristol, Gloucestershire and was severely damaged. She was on a voyage from Jamaica to Bristol.
Fanny	Ireland	The ship was lost in the Baltic Sea. She was on a voyage from Saint Petersburg, Russia to Londonderry.
Good-Intent	Great Britain	The ship foundered off "Preston Island". She was on a voyage from Cork, Ireland to Liverpool, Lancashire.
Keppel	Great Britain	The ship ran aground and sank in the River Thames. She was on a voyage from Jamaica to London.
Peggy	Great Britain	The ship was driven ashore and wrecked at Tinmouth, Northumberland. She was on a voyage from Sunderland, County Durham to Ostend, Dutch Republic.

== September ==
=== 2 September ===
List of shipwrecks: 2 September 1782
Ship	State	Description
Enterprize	(Kingdom of Great Britain) Guernsey	The ship departed from Guernsey for Newfoundland, British America. No further trace, presumed to have foundered in the Atlantic Ocean with the loss of all hands.
Resolution	(Kingdom of Great Britain) Guernsey	The ship departed from Guernsey for Newfoundland. No further trace, presumed foundered in the Atlantic Ocean with the loss of all hands.

=== 13 September ===
List of shipwrecks: 13 September 1782
Ship	State	Description
Aigle	French Navy	American Revolutionary War, Action of 15 September 1782: After she was sighted by a Royal Navy squadron while at anchor in Delaware Bay off Cape Henlopen Light at Cape Henlopen on the coast of Delaware, the frigate got underway but ran aground in the bay. After an attempt to lighten her by cutting away her masts failed, her captain ordered holes drilled in her hull to scuttle her, then surrendered her to the British on 15 September. The British refloated her and commissioned her into the Royal Navy as HMS Aigle.

=== 16 September ===
List of shipwrecks: 16 September 1782
Ship	State	Description
HMS Centaur	(Kingdom of Great Britain) Royal Navy	HMS Centaur. 1782 Central Atlantic hurricane: The third-rate ship of the line foundered off Newfoundland, British North America with the loss of over 400 lives. There were twelve survivors.
Dutton	Great Britain	1782 Central Atlantic hurricane: The stores ship foundered off Newfoundland. There were twelve or thirteen survivors. She was on a voyage from Jamaica to London.
Elizabeth	Dutch Republic	The ship sprang a leak and was abandoned by her crew, who were rescued. She was on a voyage from the Seudre, France to Dort. Elizabeth was subsequently taken in to Normantier, France by some fishermen.
HMS Glorieux	(Kingdom of Great Britain) Royal Navy	1782 Central Atlantic hurricane: The third-rate ship of the line foundered off Newfoundland with the loss of all hands.
HMS Ville de Paris	(Kingdom of Great Britain) Royal Navy	HMS Ville de Paris. 1782 Central Atlantic hurricane: The first rate ship of the line foundered off Newfoundland with the loss of all but one of her crew.

=== 17 September ===
List of shipwrecks: 17 September 1782
Ship	State	Description
British Queen	Great Britain	1782 Central Atlantic hurricane: The ship was wrecked off Newfoundland, British North America. Survivors were rescued on 19 September by Catharine (Great Britain).
HMS Ramillies	(Kingdom of Great Britain) Royal Navy	1782 Central Atlantic hurricane: The third-rate ship of the line, which had been wrecked by the hurricane, was set afire and abandoned off Newfoundland. Her crew were rescued by Belle, Ellen (both Great Britain), Silver Eel (Great Britain) and other vessels.
Rodney	Great Britain	1782 Central Atlantic hurricane: The ship foundered in the Grand Banks of Newfoundland. She was on a voyage from Jamaica to Bristol, Gloucestershire.

=== 21 September ===
List of shipwrecks: 21 September 1782
Ship	State	Description
Juno	Great Britain	The ship was wrecked at Cork, Ireland.

=== 29 September ===
List of shipwrecks: 29 September 1782
Ship	State	Description
Jonge Maria	Dutch Republic	The ship was driven ashore 2 nautical miles (3.7 km) east of Rotterdam with the loss of two of her crew. She was on a voyage from Cádiz, Spain to Ostend.

=== 30 September ===
List of shipwrecks: 30 September 1782
Ship	State	Description
Anna Helena Maria	Denmark	The ship was wrecked on the coast of Jutland. She was on a voyage from Hull, Yorkshire, Great Britain to a Danish port.

=== Unknown date ===
List of shipwrecks: Unknown date in September 1782
Ship	State	Description
Ann	Great Britain	1782 Central Atlantic hurricane: The ship foundered in the Grand Banks of Newfoundland. She was on a voyage from Jamaica to London.
Arstothelis	Great Britain	The ship was lost at Ostend, Dutch Republic. She was on a voyage from Saint Thomas, Virgin Islands to Ostend.
Black Cat	Great Britain	The ship was wrecked on Anholt, Denmark. She was on a voyage from Danzig to London.
Dumfries	Great Britain	1782 Central Atlantic hurricane: The ship foundered with the loss of all but one of her crew. She was on a voyage from Jamaica to London.
Friendship	Great Britain	The ship was wrecked on the Cross Sand, in the North Sea.
Frow Tibeta	Dutch Republic	The ship was lost near Ostend with the loss of all hands. She was on a voyage from London to Ostend.
Goede Verwachten	Dutch Republic	The ship was driven ashore on the Dutch coast. She was on a voyage from Bordeaux, France to Amsterdam.
Jonge Alloder	Dutch Republic	The ship was driven ashore on the Dutch coast. She was on a voyage from Ostend to Amsterdam.
Juffrow Henrietta	Dutch Republic	The ship was lost at Bayonne, France. She was on a voyage from Ostend to Bilbao, Spain.
Juno	Great Britain	The ship was lost at Cork.
Mentor	Great Britain	1782 Central Atlantic hurricane: The ship foundered in the Grand Banks of Newfoundland with the loss of 31 of her 34 crew. Survivors were rescued by Sarah (Great Britain). Mentor was on a voyage from Jamaica to Liverpool, Lancashire.
Minerva	Great Britain	1782 Central Atlantic hurricane: The ship foundered. She was on a voyage from Jamaica to the Clyde.
Nossa Senhora da Piedade	Portugal	The ship was driven ashore and wrecked in the River Avon at Pill, Somerset, Great Britain. She was on a voyage from Bristol to Lisbon.
Sarah Golborn	Great Britain	1782 Central Atlantic hurricane: The ship foundered in the Grand Banks of Newfoundland. She was on a voyage from Jamaica to London.
Victoria	Portugal	The ship was lost in the Baltic Sea. She was on a voyage from St. Ubes to a Baltic port.
Waeren Vriendz	flag unknown	The ship was driven ashore and wrecked. She was on a voyage from London to L'Orient and Nantes.

== October ==
=== 2 October ===
List of shipwrecks: 2 October 1782
Ship	State	Description
Hoffnung	Sweden	The ship was driven ashore and wrecked at Great Yarmouth, Norfolk, Great Britain. She was on a voyage from Stockholm to London, Great Britain.

=== 4 October ===
List of shipwrecks: 4 October 1782
Ship	State	Description
Bizarre	French Navy	The ship ran aground near Cuddalore, India and was wrecked.
HMS Hector	(Kingdom of Great Britain) Royal Navy	The Hector-class ship of the line foundered following damage sustained in the 1782 Central Atlantic hurricane. The privateer Hawke (Great Britain) rescued two hundred survivors

=== 6 October ===
List of shipwrecks: 6 October 1782
Ship	State	Description
Salt River	Great Britain	The ship was driven ashore and wrecked at Sandown Castle, Kent. She was on a voyage from Jamaica to London.

=== 10 October ===
List of shipwrecks: 10 October 1782
Ship	State	Description
San Miguel	Spanish Navy	Great Siege of Gibraltar: The 74-gun ship of the line was driven ashore at Gibraltar. She was consequently captured by the British.

=== 15 October ===
List of shipwrecks: 15 October 1782
Ship	State	Description
Arkhipelag (Архипелаг, 'Archipelago')	Russia	The frigate ran aground and sank off Berezan Island in the Black Sea. Her crew were rescued.
Earl of Hertford	British East India Company	The East Indiaman foundered off Fort St. George, Madras, India.

=== 18 October ===
List of shipwrecks: 18 October 1782
Ship	State	Description
Scipion	French Navy	Action of 18 October 1782: The Scipion-class ship of the line ran aground and was wrecked in Samaná Bay whilst evading HMS London and HMS Torbay (both (Kingdom of Great Britain) Royal Navy).

=== 20 October ===
List of shipwrecks: 20 October 1782
Ship	State	Description
Vigilant	Great Britain	The ship ran aground and capsized in the Cattewater. She was on a voyage from London to Antigua.

=== 23 October ===
List of shipwrecks: 23 October 1782
Ship	State	Description
James	Great Britain	The ship foundered in the Irish Sea off Holyhead, Anglesey. she was on a voyage from "Stranyford" to Liverpool, Lancashire.

=== 24 October ===
List of shipwrecks: 24 October 1782
Ship	State	Description
Three Friends	Great Britain	The ship was driven ashore and wrecked in Cranford Bay. She was on a voyage from Liverpool, Lancashire to Belfast, County Down, Ireland.

=== 26 October ===
List of shipwrecks: 26 October 1782
Ship	State	Description
Belmont Castle	Great Britain	The ship was lost near Lindisfarne, Northumberland. She was on a voyage from Perth to London.
Unnamed	Great Britain	The ship went ashore at Barnegat, New Jersey.

=== 29 October ===
List of shipwrecks: 29 October 1782
Ship	State	Description
Unity	Great Britain	The ship was lost in St Ives Bay.

=== 31 October ===
List of shipwrecks: 31 October 1782
Ship	State	Description
Flora	Great Britain	The ship was driven ashore and wrecked near Walmer Castle, Kent. Her crew were rescued.

=== Unknown date ===
List of shipwrecks: Unknown date in October 1782
Ship	State	Description
Betsey	Great Britain	American Revolutionary War: The ship was driven ashore in the Bahama Passage by an American privateer and was wrecked. She was on a voyage from Saint Augustine, Florida, British America to Jamaica.
Catherine van Memel	Prussia	The ship was driven ashore and wrecked at Ostend, Dutch Republic. She was on a voyage from Memel to Limerick, Ireland.
Edward	Great Britain	The ship was lost near Liverpool, Lancashire. She was on a voyage from Antigua to Liverpool.
Morning Star	Great Britain	The ship was lost near Ostend. She was on a voyage from Grenada to Ostend.
Seven Sisters	Great Britain	The ship was lost near Dunkirk, France with the loss of all but two of her crew. She was on a voyage from Hull, Yorkshire to Ostend.
Sophia Albertina	Sweden	The ship was wrecked on the Burbo Bank, in Liverpool Bay. She was on a voyage from Gothenburg to Liverpool.
Stadt Revall	Russia	The ship was lost in the White Sea. She was on a voyage from Arkhangelsk to London.
St Paulus	Sweden	The ship was driven ashore 6 nautical miles (11 km) from Bowness-on-Solway, Cumberland, Great Britain. She was on a voyage from Gothenburg to Bowness-in-Solway.
William	Great Britain	The ship foundered in the Atlantic Ocean off Land's End, Cornwall. She was on a voyage from Tingmouth, Devon to Liverpool.
Withywood	Great Britain	1782 Central Atlantic hurricane: The ship foundered in the Grand Banks of Newfoundland. Her crew were rescued by Thetis (Great Britain). Withywood was on a voyage from Jamaica to London.

== November ==
=== 3 November ===
List of shipwrecks: 3 November 1782
Ship	State	Description
Adventure	Great Britain	The brig was driven ashore and wrecked at Whitby, Yorkshire. Her crew were rescued. she was on a voyage from London to North Shields, County Durham.

=== 6 November ===
List of shipwrecks: 6 November 1782
Ship	State	Description
Christianstadt	Denmark	The ship was lost in the Kattegat. She was on a voyage from Copenhagen to Tranquebar, Danish India.

=== 9 November ===
List of shipwrecks: 9 November 1782
Ship	State	Description
Telemacho	Great Britain	The ship was wrecked on Barbuda. She was on a voyage from London to Nevis and Saint Kitts.

=== 11 November ===
List of shipwrecks: 11 November 1782
Ship	State	Description
No. 3	Russia	The pilot boat was driven ashore and wrecked on Naissaar with the loss of one life. She had been sent from Reval to help an unnamed wrecked British ship, whose saved crew in turn helped in the rescue of her crew afterwards.

=== 17 November ===
List of shipwrecks: 17 November 1782
Ship	State	Description
Cork Packet	Ireland	The ship departed from Quebec, British North America for Cork. No further trace, presumed foundered in the Atlantic Ocean with the loss of all hands.
Oldenburger	Hamburg	The ship was wrecked on the North Brake with the loss of a crew member. She was on a voyage from Hamburg to the West Indies.

=== 23 November ===
List of shipwrecks: 23 November 1782
Ship	State	Description
Koron (Корон, 'Koroni')	Imperial Russian Navy	The ship was wrecked by ice in Taganrog Bay in the Sea of Azov with the loss of 29 of her 123 crew. She was on a voyage from Kerch to Taganrog. See also: List of shipwrecks in 1781 § December
St Andre	Russia	The ship was lost at Rügen, Swedish Pomerania. She was on a voyage from Saint Petersburg to London, Great Britain.
Tweed	Great Britain	The ship was lost near Swinemünde, Prussia. she was on a voyage from Saint Petersburg to Leith, Lothian. She was refloated in December and taken in to "Wolgat" for repairs.

=== 25 November ===
List of shipwrecks: 25 November 1782
Ship	State	Description
Taganrog (Таганрог)	Imperial Russian Navy	The ship was wrecked by ice in the Sea of Azov with the loss of 32 of her 100 crew. She was on a voyage from Yenikale to Taganrog. See also: List of shipwrecks in 1781 § December

=== 28 November ===
List of shipwrecks: 28 November 1782
Ship	State	Description
Christiana Frederica	Denmark	The ship was wrecked on the Goodwin Sands, Kent, Great Britain. Her crew were rescued. She was on a voyage from Nantes, France to Christiana.
Fame	Great Britain	The ship was driven ashore and wrecked at Plymouth, Devon. She was on a voyage from Newfoundland, British America to Plymouth.
St Varlem	Russia	The ship was driven ashore at "Fromoe", Norway. She was on a voyage from Saint Petersburg to London, Great Britain.

=== 30 November ===
List of shipwrecks: 30 November 1782
Ship	State	Description
Knas Demetry Babetschiff	Russia	The ship was driven ashore and wrecked on Bornholm, Denmark. She was on a voyage from Saint Petersburg to Hull, Yorkshire, Great Britain.

=== Unknown date ===
List of shipwrecks: Unknown date in November 1782
Ship	State	Description
Dame Esperance	Portugal	The ship was wrecked on the French coast. She was on a voyage from Saint Petersburg, Russia to Porto.
Dixon	Great Britain	The victualling ship was lost at Halifax, Nova Scotia, British North America.
Grafina Severnai	Russia	The ship was wrecked on the Lisknar Reef, in the Baltic Sea. She was on a voyage from Saint Petersburg to London.
Hardiesse	Flag unknown	The ship foundered in the North Sea off Orford Haven, Suffolk, Great Britain. She was on a voyage from London to Great Yarmouth, Norfolk.
Kidney	Great Britain	The ship was driven ashore and wrecked on Naissaar, Russia. She was on a voyage from Saint Petersburg to London.
Reino dos Anjos	Portugal	The ship was wrecked on the French coast. She was on a voyage from Saint Petersburg to Porto.
Rose	Great Britain	Fourth Anglo-Dutch War: The ship was captured by a Dutch vessel operating under a Letter of Marque. She was subsequently driven ashore and wrecked on the Dutch coast. Rose was on a voyage from Montserrat to Ostend, Dutch Republic.
Santíssimo Sacramento	Portugal	The ship was lost near Alderney, Channel Islands.
St. Theresa	Kingdom of Sicily	The ship was driven ashore at Montreuil-sur-Mer, France. She was on a voyage from Naples to Livorno, Grand Duchy of Tuscany and London. St. Theresa was later refloated and taken in to Stangate Creek.
Wandringsmanden	Dutch Republic	The ship was wrecked on the Dutch coast.
Wendan Castle	Great Britain	The ship was wrecked on the Cable Grounds, in the Baltic Sea. Her crew were rescued. She was on a voyage from Hull, Yorkshire to "Wyburgh".
Weser	Bremen	The ship was lost near Calais, France.

== December ==
=== 1 December ===
List of shipwrecks: 1 December 1782
Ship	State	Description
Endeavour	Great Britain	The ship was lost 25 leagues (75 nautical miles (139 km)) east of Halifax, Nova Scotia, British North America. She was on a voyage from Exeter, Devon to Quebec City, British North America.

=== 9 December ===
List of shipwrecks: 9 December 1782
Ship	State	Description
Poisson Volant	France	Anglo-French War (1778–83): The privateer was sunk in the English Channel off Portland, Dorset, Great Britain by Speedwell (Great Britain). Her 31 crew were rescued by Speedwell.

=== 13 December ===
List of shipwrecks: 13 December 1782
Ship	State	Description
Tarantul (Тарантул, 'Tarantula')	Imperial Russian Navy	The galiot ran aground in Kazantyp Bay. She was blown ashore and wrecked two days later. Her crew survived.

=== 14 December ===
List of shipwrecks: 14 December 1782
Ship	State	Description
Nostra Señora Del Carmen	Spain	The ship, a cartel, struck a log and sank in the Garonne at Bordeaux. She was on a voyage from London, Great Britain to New Orleans, New Spain.

=== 28 December ===
List of shipwrecks: 28 December 1782
Ship	State	Description
HMS Albany	(Kingdom of Great Britain) Royal Navy	The prison ship, a former 16-gun sloop-of-war, grounded on a ledge in the Northern Triangles (43°55′39″N 69°01′04″W) in Penobscot Bay off the coast of Massachusetts (now Maine), broke up, and sank. She was on a voyage from Boston, Massachusetts, to Penobscot, Massachusetts (now Maine), United States.

=== 31 December ===
List of shipwrecks: 31 December 1782
Ship	State	Description
Sally	Great Britain	The ship was wrecked at St. Augustine.

=== Unknown date ===
List of shipwrecks: Unknown date in December 1782
Ship	State	Description
Catharine	Dutch Republic	The ship foundered in the Kattegat. She was on a voyage from Saint Petersburg, Russia to Ostend.
De Sonne	Dutch Republic	The ship was destroyed by fire off Ostend. She was on a voyage from London, Great Britain to Ostend and the West Indies.
Endeavour	Great Britain	The ship was driven ashore and wrecked at Oxwich Point, Glamorgan. Her crew were rescued. She was on a voyage from Hayl, Cornwall to Swansey, Glamorgan.
Georgina Gustava	Sweden	The ship was wrecked on Öland. She was on a voyage from Stockholm to Plymouth, Devon, Great Britain.
Good-intent	Great Britain	The ship was run down and sunk in The Downs.
Hope	Denmark	The ship was wrecked on a reef off Skagen. She was on a voyage from Copenhagen to the East Indies.
Lucia	France	The ship was lost near Nieuwpoort, Dutch Republic. She was on a voyage from Dunkirk to Rouen.
Neptune	Great Britain	The ship was lost on the Katchups, in the Atlantic Ocean off the coast of Portugal. She was on a voyage from Newfoundland, British America to Lisbon.
Swerr	Great Britain	The ship was lost near "Aspa". she was on a voyage from Saint Petersburg, Russia to London.
Vrow Christiana	Denmark	The ship was wrecked near Waterford, Ireland. She was on a voyage from Cork, Ireland to the West Indies.

== Unknown date ==
List of shipwrecks: Unknown date in 1782
Ship	State	Description
Alexander	Great Britain	The whaler was lost in the Greenland Sea. Her crew survived.
Beatton	Great Britain	The ship was wrecked on Anticosti Island, British America. She was on a voyage from a British port to Quebec, British America.
Bellona	Great Britain	The ship was lost in the Saint Lawrence River. She was on a voyage from London to Quebec, British America.
Blagrove	Great Britain	The ship was lost in Buckeners Bay, Jamaica.
Brothers	Ireland	The ship foundered in the Atlantic Ocean. She was on a voyage from Cork to Quebec.
Christie	Great Britain	The transport ship was lost in the Saint Lawrence River.
De Sci	France	The brig was wrecked near Portrush, County Antrim, Ireland.
Desire	Great Britain	The transport ship was lost on Long Island, Rhode Island, United States.
Douglass	Great Britain	Anglo-French War (1778–83): The ship was burnt at Saint Kitts by the French.
Earl of Dartmouth	British East India Company	The East Indiaman was lost in the East Indies.
Elizabeth	Great Britain	The victualling ship was lost near Long Island.
El Rosario	Spain	The ship was wrecked on Faial Island, Azores.
Emanuel and Hercules	Great Britain	The ship was driven ashore in the Gulf of Florida. She was burnt to prevent capture.
Enterprize	Great Britain	The ship was wrecked on Red Island, Newfoundland, British America. She was on a voyage from Liverpool, Lancashire to Quebec.
Fly	Great Britain	The ship was presumed to have foundered with the loss of all hands whilst on a voyage from Lancaster, Lancashire to the West Indies.
Forth	Great Britain	The cargo sloop was wrecked off Great Yarmouth.
Freeman	Great Britain	The ship was run down and sunk in the Atlantic Ocean. She was on a voyage from Antigua to London.
Free Trade	Ireland	The ship foundered. Her crew were rescued. She was on a voyage from Cork to Quebec.
George and Jane	Ireland	The ship exploded and sank whilst on a voyage from Cork to Quebec. Her crew were rescued.
General Dalling	Great Britain	The ship was wrecked on the north coast of Jamaica.
Hare	Great Britain	The ship foundered in the Atlantic Ocean. She was on a voyage from Barbados to Newfoundland.
HDMS Indfødstretten	Royal Dano-Norwegian Navy	The ship of the line foundered with the loss of all hands.
Jane	Great Britain	The ship foundered in the Atlantic Ocean. She was on a voyage from New York, United States to London.
Jason	Great Britain	The ship was driven ashore and wrecked on the coast of Guinea.
Lark	Great Britain	African slave trade: The ship was lost near Barbados. Three hundred and twenty slaves were rescued.
Liberty	United States	American Revolutionary War: The ship was captured, but was recaptured by the privateer Virginia (United States). She was subsequently burnt. Liberty was on a voyage from East Florida to London.
London	Great Britain	The ship was lost in the Saint Lawrence River. She was on a voyage from Quebec to London.
Maidstone	Great Britain	The privateer capsized in a whirlwind with the loss of all but eight of her crew.
Mius (Миус)	Imperial Russian Navy	The yacht departed on 22 October from Constantinople, Ottoman Empire for Kherson. No further trace, presumed foundered with the loss of all hands. Rumours that she was wrecked on the coast of Abkhazia and subsequently repaired by the Ottomans, with the crew taken prisoner, were not substantiated.
Nadezhda Blagopoluchiya (Надежда Благополучия, 'Hope of Prosperity')	Imperial Russian Navy	The brigantine was wrecked in the Kuril Islands with the loss of all hands. She was on a voyage from Okhotsk to ru:Nizhnekamchatsk.
Philip	Great Britain	The ship capsized whilst on a voyage from Newfoundland to Barbados.
Pilgrim	United States	American Revolution: The privateer was run aground on Cape Cod while being pursued by frigate HMS Chatham ( (Kingdom of Great Britain) Royal Navy) sometime in June, July, or August.
Priscilla	Great Britain	The ship was lost at Jamaica.
Rebecca	Great Britain	The ship was wrecked on Bequia. She was on a voyage from Demerara to Barbados and London.
Reynolds	Great Britain	The ship foundered in the Atlantic Ocean 150 leagues (450 nautical miles (830 km)) west of Land's End, Cornwall. Her crew were rescued. She was on a voyage from Jamaica to London.
Scanderoon	Great Britain	The galley sprang a leak in the Atlantic Ocean (40°55′N 56°42′W) and was abandoned by her crew. She was on a voyage from Halifax, Nova Scotia, British America to Cork.
Tom	Great Britain	The ship was lost at Halifax, Nova Scotia, British America. She was on a voyage from Antigua to Halifax.
Volich (Волич)	Imperial Russian Navy	The ship was wrecked in ice off Petrushina Spit in Taganrog Bay in the Sea of Azov. Her crew survived.
York	Great Britain	The ship was lost in the Bay d'Espoir. She was on a voyage from Quebec, British America to New York.
Young Hendrick	Prussia	The galiot was wrecked on the coast of Lapland. Her crew were rescued by Stephen (Great Britain).
