= Middelburg (ship) =

Dutch ship (1775–1781)

History

Dutch Republic
- Name: Middelburg
- Namesake: Middelburg
- Owner: Dutch East India Company; Chamber of Zeeland
- Completed: 1775
- Out of service: 21 July 1781
- Fate: Burned, exploded and sank on 21 July 1781

General characteristics
- Type: East Indiaman
- Length: 150 feet
- Capacity: loading capacity: 575 last (1150 tons)

Middelburg, also written as Middelburgh, was an 18th-century East Indiaman merchant ship of the Dutch East India Company. She sailed to Batavia, the Dutch East Indies and to Guangzhou, China. In 1781, during her return voyage to the Dutch Republic, she was ambushed by a squadron of Royal Navy warships by the Royal Navy during the Battle of Saldanha Bay. The crew set the ship on fire. After the powder magazine exploded, the ship sank.

The wreck was discovered in 1781 and is legally protected.

== Ship details ==
Middelburg was built in 1775 in Zeeland for the Chamber of Zeeland. She was made of wood, 150 feet long and had a loading capacity of 575 last (1150 tons). The ship had 24 guns.

Middelburg has its name of the city Middelburg on Walcheren in Zeeland where the Chamber of Zeeland was located.

== History and fate ==
On 28 December 1779, departing from Fort Rammekens, she made her maiden voyage to Batavia, Dutch East Indies under command of Justinus van Gennep. She had an intermediate stop at Cape of Good Hope for two weeks from 12 April to 24 April 1772 and arrived at Batavia on 4 July 1780. She later continued the same year to Guangzhou, China.

On 15 January 1781 Middelburg returned from Guangzhou, China to the Dutch Republic together with the ships Honkoop, Hoog Carspel and Paerl. Middelburg had a cargo value of ƒ 643,543 for the Chamber of Zeeland. They arrived at Cape of Good Hope for an intermediate stop on 31 March 1781 and the fleet continued their voyage on 13 June 1781.

On 21 July 1781, as part of the Fourth Anglo-Dutch War during the Battle of Saldanha Bay the fleet was ambushed by a squadron of Royal Navy warships under the command of commodore George Johnstone. The crew of Middelburg followed the instructions of the governor of the Cape Colony to prepare the ships for destruction when English capture threatened. The ship was therefore set on fire. The burning Middelburg was towed away by the British Active. Due to the fire, the powder magazine exploded and the ship sank. The crew abandoned the ship on time. Five other Dutch East India Company ships were captured including Dankbaarheid and Honkoop.

== Shipwreck ==
The wreck was discovered in the Saldanha Bay in 1971 after indications of the fisherman Charlie 'Cha Cha' Adonis, who had also noticed the wreck of the Meresteyn. The wreck of the Middelburg was located by the same diver who also located the Meresteyn. The wreck is legally protected.
