= French cutter Pandour (1780) =

History

France
- Name: Pandour
- Builder: Jacques and Daniel Denÿs, Dunkirk
- Launched: 16 June 1780
- Captured: 1 June 1795

Great Britain
- Name: HMS Pandora
- Acquired: December 1795 by capture
- Commissioned: September 1796
- Fate: Foundered June 1797

General characteristics
- Class & type: Mutin-class (Note: The Royal Navy captured three of her sister ships – Tapageur, Mutin, and Pilot – and took them into service as well.)
- Type: Cutter, converted to brig
- Displacement: 212 tons (French)
- Tons burthen: 231 27/94 (bm)
- Length: 78 ft 0 in (23.8 m) (overall); 60 ft 0 1/4 in (18.3 m) (keel)
- Beam: 26 ft 11 in (8.2 m)
- Depth of hold: 10 ft 6 in (3.2 m)
- Propulsion: Sails
- Sail plan: Brig
- Complement: French service: 85-115; British service:75
- Armament: 14 × 6-pounder guns (French and British service)

Pandour was a 14-gun brig of the French Navy launched in 1780 as a cutter. The Royal Navy captured her in December 1795 and took her into service as HMS Pandora, but she foundered in June 1797.

== French service and capture ==
Jacques and Daniel Denys built Pandour as a cutter at Dunkirk in 1780 and launched her on 16 June. She took part in the Battle of Fort Royal on 29 April and 30 April 1781.

In 1782 she was re-rigged as a brig at Brest. In 1786, she was attached to a division comprising Experiment, Boulonnaise and Rossignol, cruising off the coasts of Africa.

From 1787 to 1790, she was in the Far-East.

In 1792 she was under the command of Lieutenant Bertrand de Keranguen. (Note: Two years later he was captain of the 74-gun Éole at the Glorious First of June, during which battle he was killed.) His successor in 1793 as commander was enseigne de vaisseau non-entretenu Hardouin, later promoted to lieutenant de vaisseau. Pandour was based out of Dunkirk and cruised in the North Sea, going as far as Bergen.

Caroline captured Pandour on 1 December 1795. Caroline was part of Admiral Lord Duncan's squadron in the North Sea and when two strange vessels were spotted, Duncan signaled to Caroline to pursue. After about four and half hours and some pro forma exchange of fire, Caroline captured Pandour of fourteen 6-pounder guns and 108 men. She was three days out of Dunkirk. The other French vessel escaped while Caroline was securing her prisoners. The second vessel was the Septnie, of twelve 4-pounder guns. When prize money was awarded, Caroline shared it with the other ships of the squadron.

== British service and loss ==
The Royal Navy had Pandora fitted and coppered at Deptford between January 1796 and 6 May. Lieutenant Samuel Mason commissioned Pandora in September. She disappeared in the North Sea in June 1797, and was presumed to have foundered with the loss of all hands.
