= HMS Tapageur =

Cutter of the Royal Navy

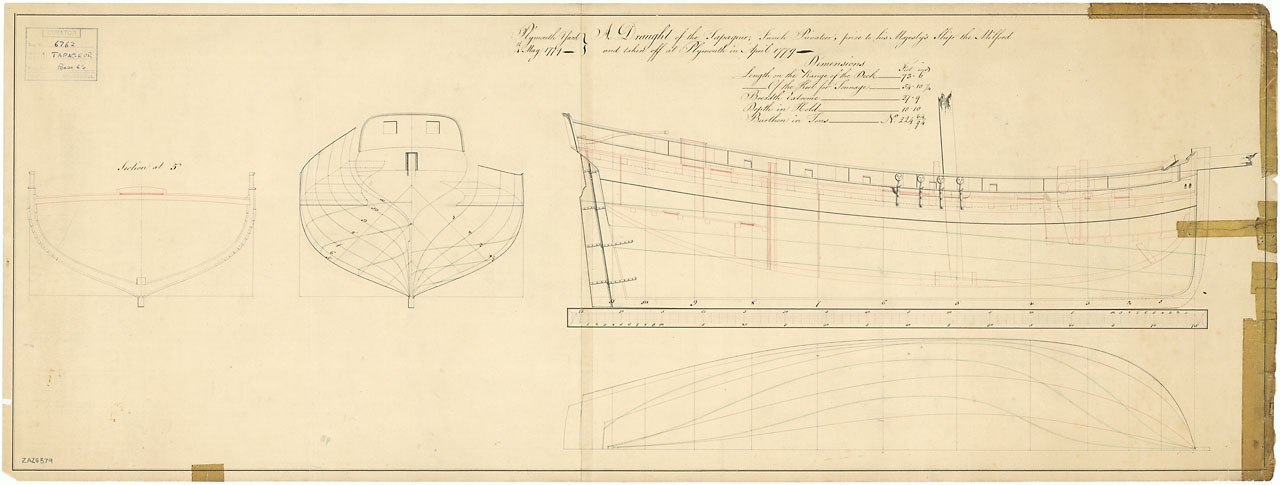
- Tapageur

History

France
- Name: Tapageur
- Namesake: Blusterer
- Builder: Dunkirk or Saint-Malo
- Launched: 1778 or 1779
- Captured: March 1779

Great Britain
- Name: HMS Tapageur
- Acquired: March 1779 by capture
- Commissioned: May 1779
- Fate: Wrecked March 1780

General characteristics
- Class & type: Mutin-class cutter
- Tons burthen: 22464/94 (bm)
- Length: 73 ft 6 in (22.4 m) (overall); 54 ft 10 1/2 in (16.7 m) (keel)
- Beam: 27 ft 9 in (8.5 m)
- Depth of hold: 10 ft 10 in (3.3 m)
- Propulsion: Sails
- Armament: 14 × 4-pounder guns + 10 swivel guns

HMS Tapageur was the French privateer cutter Tapageur, launched in 1778 or 1779, possibly at Dunkirk. The British captured her in 1779, while she was operating out of Saint Malo. She wrecked a year later in the West Indies.

== Career ==
The British warships Apollo, Porcupine, and Milford captured Tapaguer, of Saint-Malo, on 15 March 1779. (Note: The Royal Navy captured three of her sister ships and took them all into service as well. These three were Pandora, Mutine, and Pilot.) A report in the Mercure has her striking on the arrival of three British warships after she had held off a British privateer of 20 guns for four-and-a-half hours.

Tapageur was commissioned into the Royal Navy in May under the command of Lieutenant Lord Charles FitzGerald. She then spent the summer in Admiral Hardy's fleet in the Channel. In late 1779 she was at Portsmouth, attached to Admiral Rodney's fleet, which was preparing to take troops to Gibraltar, Minorca, and the West Indies. The fleet sailed on Christmas Day from St Helens, Isle of Wight. On 4 January 1780, Rodney detached Captain Hyde Parker, Jr. at 46°2′N 13°12′W in the 74-gun Hector, together with Phoenix, Greyhound, and Tapageur to escort the West Indies convoy, which was transporting troops from the 88th Regiment of Foot and the 89th Regiment of Foot.

== Fate ==
Tapageur was wrecked in March while warping into Carenage Bay at Saint Lucia. The British had captured Saint Lucia in December, though Tapageur arrived too late to participate.

== Questionable information ==
Although the records are clear that Tapageur was wrecked, there are later accounts of her continued service. First, Rodney lists her as repeating an order to Marlborough at the Battle of Martinique on 17 April. Second, she appears in order of battle at the Battle of Porto Praya under the command of Lieutenant Philip D'Auvergne. Then she accompanied Jason on a reconnaissance towards the Cape of Good Hope and returned to Porto Praya with the news of the presence at Saldanha Bay of five Dutch East Indiamen. The British sailed there and captured four (the fifth was destroyed) at the Battle of Saldanha Bay. However, none of these accounts is supported by primary sources.
