= Honkoop =

Dutch ship (1770–1782)

History

Dutch Republic
- Name: Honkoop
- Owner: Dutch East India Company; Chamber of Amsterdam
- Completed: 1770
- Captured: 21 July 1781

Great Britain
- Acquired: 21 July 1781
- Out of service: January 1782
- Fate: Lost in January 1782

General characteristics
- Type: East Indiaman
- Length: 150 feet
- Capacity: loading capacity: 545 last (1150 tons)
- Crew: 273-313

Honkoop, also written as Honcoop or Hencoop, was an 18th-century East Indiaman of the Dutch East India Company. She was a merchant ship that made multiple voyages from Texel, Dutch Republic to Batavia, the Dutch East Indies. The Royal Navy captured her in 1781 during the Battle of Saldanha Bay. In 1782 during a gale, the ship with up to 313 crew members, was lost; she was believed to have foundered with all hands.

== Ship details ==
Honkoop was built in 1770 in Amsterdam for the Chamber of Amsterdam. She was made of wood, 150 feet long and had a loading capacity of 545 last (1150 tons). The ship had 20 guns.

== History and fate ==
On 31 December October 1771, departing from Texel, she made her first voyage to Batavia under command of Pieter Sijbrandsz Flout. She made an intermediate stop at Cape of Good Hope for two weeks from 9 April to 22 April 1772, and arrived at Batavia on 26 June 1772. In Batavia Honcoop was replaced by Veldhoen for a voyage to Guangzhou, China. Honcoop therefore returned to the Dutch Republic. Departing on 30 October 1774, she arrived via Cape of Good Hope (23 December 1772 - 4 February 1773), and arrived in Texel on 24 May 1773, under command of Karel Philip Kassel.

She made a second voyage from Texel to Batavia under command of Pieter Haverkamp. She departed on 8 December 1773, from Texel and arrived on 6 September 1974, in Batavia via Cape of Good Hope. She started her return voyage on 21 January 1775, and arrived in Texel on 17 July 1775, having stopped at the Cape of Good Hope.

Her third return voyage was from Texel to Dutch Ceylon (now Sri Lanka) under command of Daniel Deune. The voyage was between 16 December 1775 and 2 August 1777. She was for half a year in Dutch Ceylon between 30 July 1776 and 11 February 1777. She returned not to Texel but to Rammekens, for the Chamber of Zeeland.

Her fourth voyage was again from Texel to Batavia. Departing on 19 July 1778, under command of Nikolaas Sevie, she arrived on 01 May 1779 in Batavia. In Batavia Honkoop replaced Dolphijn for a voyage to Guangzhou, China where she arrived in 1780.

=== Capture ===
On 15 January 1781 Honkoop returned from Guangzhou, China to the Dutch Republic with a cargo value of ƒ 657,335 for the Chamber of Zeeland. After the regular intermediate stop at Cape of Good Hope between 31 March and 13 June 1781, she was captured as part of the Fourth Anglo-Dutch War during the Battle of Saldanha Bay by a squadron of Royal Navy warships under the command of Commodore George Johnstone. Also four other Dutch East India Company ships were captured, including Dankbaarheid.

She was lost on 21 July 1781, While on her way to Great Britain as a prize.

=== Fate ===
Honkoop was lost in January 1782 as the result of a gale in the Indian Ocean and believed to have foundered with all hands.
