= Battle of Saldanha Bay (1781) =

1781 battle of the Fourth Anglo-Dutch War

- Part of the Fourth Anglo-Dutch War
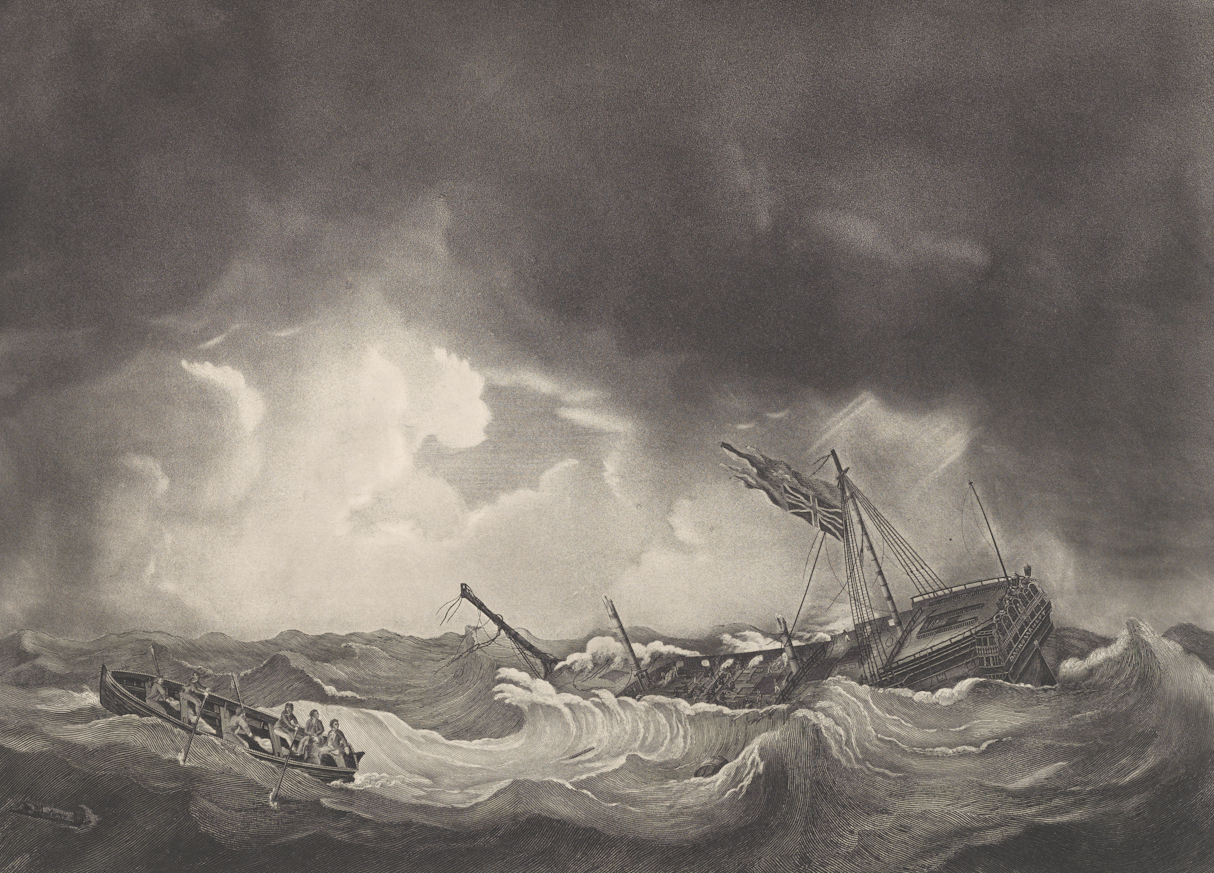
- Dankbaarheid, a Dutch ship captured during the battle, foundering on 30 January 1782
Date	21 July 1781
Location	Saldanha Bay, Dutch Cape Colony 33°01′S 17°57′E
Result	British victory

Belligerents
Great Britain	Dutch Republic

Commanders and leaders
George Johnstone	Gerrit Harmeyer (surrendered)

Strength
5 ships of the line 3 frigates 2 cutters 1 bomb vessel 1 fireship 2 troopships 5 merchant ships	8 merchant ships

Casualties and losses
None	5 merchant ships captured 1 merchant ship destroyed

The Battle of Saldanha Bay was a naval action that occurred off the Dutch Cape Colony on 21 July 1781 during the Fourth Anglo-Dutch War. A squadron of Royal Navy warships under the command of commodore George Johnstone captured five Dutch East India Company ships; her own crew destroyed a sixth. Casualties on the Dutch side were minimal if any, and there were no British casualties.

== Background ==
British Commodore George Johnstone was given secret orders to capture the Dutch Cape Colony. However, the French learned of his mission, and Admiral Pierre André de Suffren was sent to frustrate it. Suffren was en route to the Indian Ocean, but the French government had warned him so he sought to reach the Cape before Johnstone. After an indecisive chance encounter (Battle of Porto Praya), between the two fleets in the Cape Verde Islands on 16 April 1781, Suffren sailed for the Cape while Johnstone remained at Porto Praya for repairs. As a result, Johnstone found the Dutch settlement well defended when he arrived there in July and decided against an attack.

The Dutch governor Joachim van Plettenberg had, as a precaution, directed the westbound merchant fleet, laden with goods, to anchor in Saldanha Bay and wait for French escort but where they would be concealed from the British fleet. They were under orders to ground and burn their ships if the British were to appear; however they were not vigilant in their watches.

One of Johnstone's frigates, flying French colours, intercepted a Dutch merchantmen that had left the bay several days earlier, heading east. The Dutch vessel was theHeld Woltemade, which had sailed from Saldanha Bay on 28 June carrying stores and £40,000 in bullion to Ceylon. She struck to HMS Active on 1 July. (Note: Both Lark and Rattlesnake, and probably the rest of the squadron as well, shared in the prize money for Held woltenmade. That prize money for Held woltenmade was paid suggests that Held woltenmade had arrived safely at a British port and had been condemned there.) From Held Woltemade Johnstone learned of the whereabouts of the Dutch merchantmen.

== Battle ==
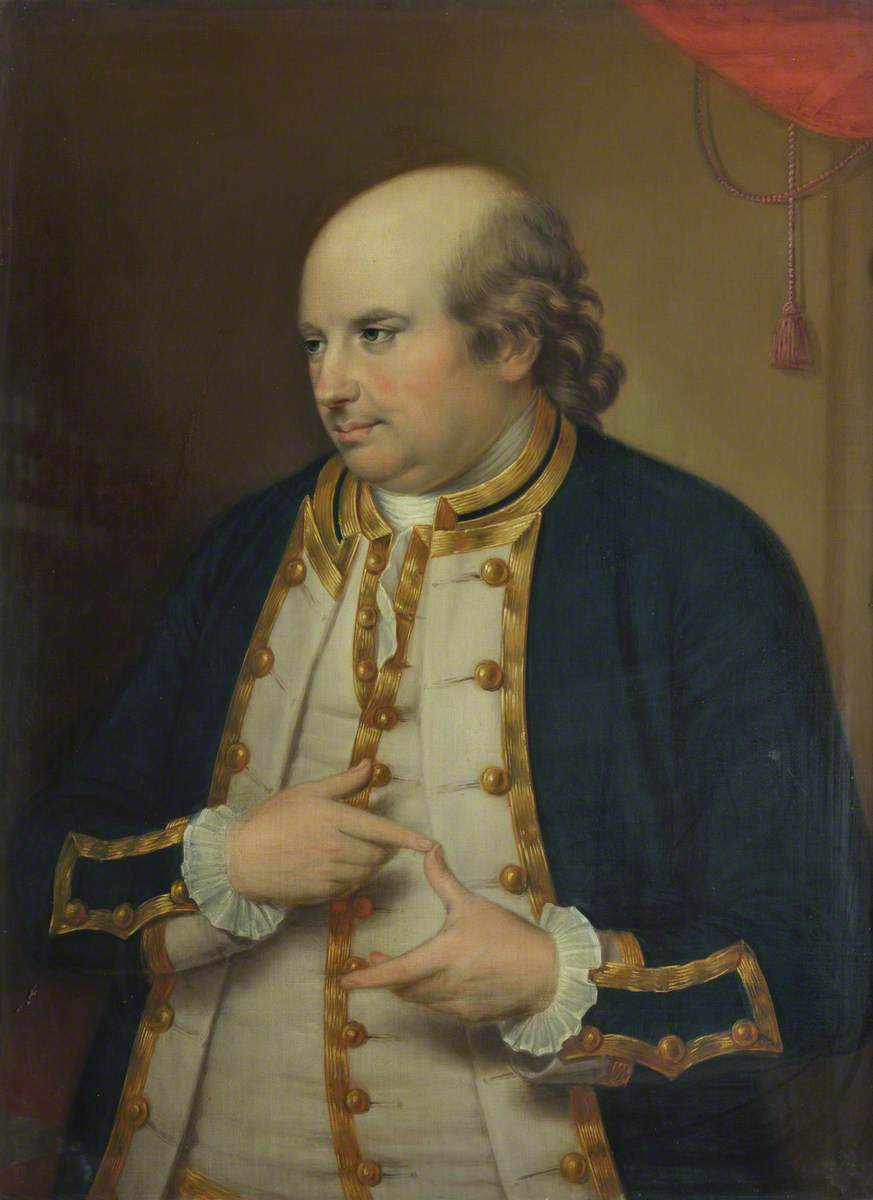
George Johnstone, the British commander at the battle

Bearing off Saldanha Bay Johnstone sighted the Dutch merchant ships, and entered the bay flying French colors. He then raised the British ensign and opened fire, totally surprising the Dutch. The Dutch could not escape and decided to destroy their ships rather than let them fall into British hands. The Dutch cut their cables, loosed their top sails, and drove the vessels on shore. Once this was done they attempted to torch the ships, and the British, now in their boats, attempted to extinguish the fires. The British were successful, taking as prizes Dankbaerheid, Paerl, Honcoop, and Hoogcarspel. Middelburg, however, burnt furiously and was left alone. She blew up after very nearly colliding with two of the prizes.

Rattlesnake surprised and captured a hooker (a type of coastal craft), laden with the sails of the captured ships and hidden away behind Schapin (Schaapen) Island. The Dutch had put the sails on board and hidden the hooker to make seizing the Indiamen more difficult. By the end of the day the British had captured another two hookers, which Johnstone could not easily remove. In order not to leave any marks of "barbarity towards a settlement where our wants had so often been relieved", he gave them back to the Dutch.

== Aftermath ==
After the British Royal Navy captured the Dutch East Indiamen, a boat rowed out to meet the British warships. On board were the "kings of Ternate and Tidore, and the princes of the respective families". The Dutch had long held these captives on Isle Robin, but then had moved them to Saldanha Bay.

The British sent their prizes back to England. Only two reached their destination, and that with difficulty and after some fighting in the English Channel. A French frigate attacked Hoogcarspel, but she succeeded in getting to Mount's Bay where she was escorted. Also, two French privateers attacked Paerl, which succeeded in escaping. Dankbaerheid and Honcoop were lost in January 1782 as the result of a gale at the mouth of the Channel. The prize crew on Dankbaerheid were able to escape and reached Lisbon in safety. Honcoop disappeared and was believed to have foundered with all hands.

== Order of battle ==
=== Dutch order of battle ===
The information below on the Dutch vessels captured at Saldhana Bay comes from Lloyd's List, van Niekerk, and Nieuwe Nederlandsche jaerboeken.

Name	Master	Tons burthen	Guns	Voyage	Notes
Dankbaerheid	Hendrik Steetsel (or Steedsel)	1000	24	Bengal to Rotterdam	Lost on passage to England; built for the Rotterdam Chamber in 1772; cargo value: ƒ 427,490 (Rotterdam), 353,265 (Delft), and 130 (Amsterdam)
Paerl (or Paarl)	Dirk Cornelisz. Plokker	1100	20	China to Amsterdam	Built for the Amsterdam Chamber in 1778; cargo value: ƒ658,673
Honcoop (or Hencoop)	Axellandt	1100	20	China to Amsterdam	Lost on passage to England; built for the Zeeland Chamber in 1770; cargo value: ƒ657,355
Hoogcarspel	Gerrit Harmeir, (or Harmeyer), Commodore for the squadron	1100	20	China to Amsterdam	Built 1771 for the Delft Chamber; cargo value: ƒ516,911
Held Woltemade	Swerus Vrolyk	1100	14	Amsterdam to Ceylon	Captured prior to the "battle"
Middelburg	Justus van Gennep, (or Van Gennip))	1100	24	China to Amsterdam	Burnt; built for the Zeeland Chamber in 1775; cargo value: ƒ 643,543

The British had insured their prizes so when Dankbaerheid and Honcoop were lost in transit to Britain the captors still benefited from the insurance money. The total prize money for Paerl and Hoogcarspel, which was divided between Johnstone's squadron and the Army under the command of General Sir William Meadows, amounted to £68,000.

=== British order of battle ===
Warships (per prize money announcements):

- HMS Hero (74)
- HMS Monmouth (64)
- HMS Isis (50)
- HMS Jupiter (50)
- HMS Romney (50)
- HMS Jason (36)
- HMS Active (32)
- HMS Diana (28)
- HMS Rattlesnake (16)
- HMS Lark (16) (Note: Some sources state that HMS Tapageur (14-gun cutter), under Lieutenant Philippe d'Auvergne, was part of the squadron, not Lark. However, Tapaguer had sunk a year before. Furthermore, Lark, under d'Auvergne, was part of Johnstone's squadron.)
- HMS Infernal (1778) (6)
- HMS Terror (8)

In addition to the warships, the following troopships also shared in the prize money for the Paerl and Hoogkarspel: San Carlos, Porpoise, Raikes, Royal Charlotte, Resolution, Manilla, and Pondicherry.
