= Dankbaarheid =

Dutch ship (1772–1782)

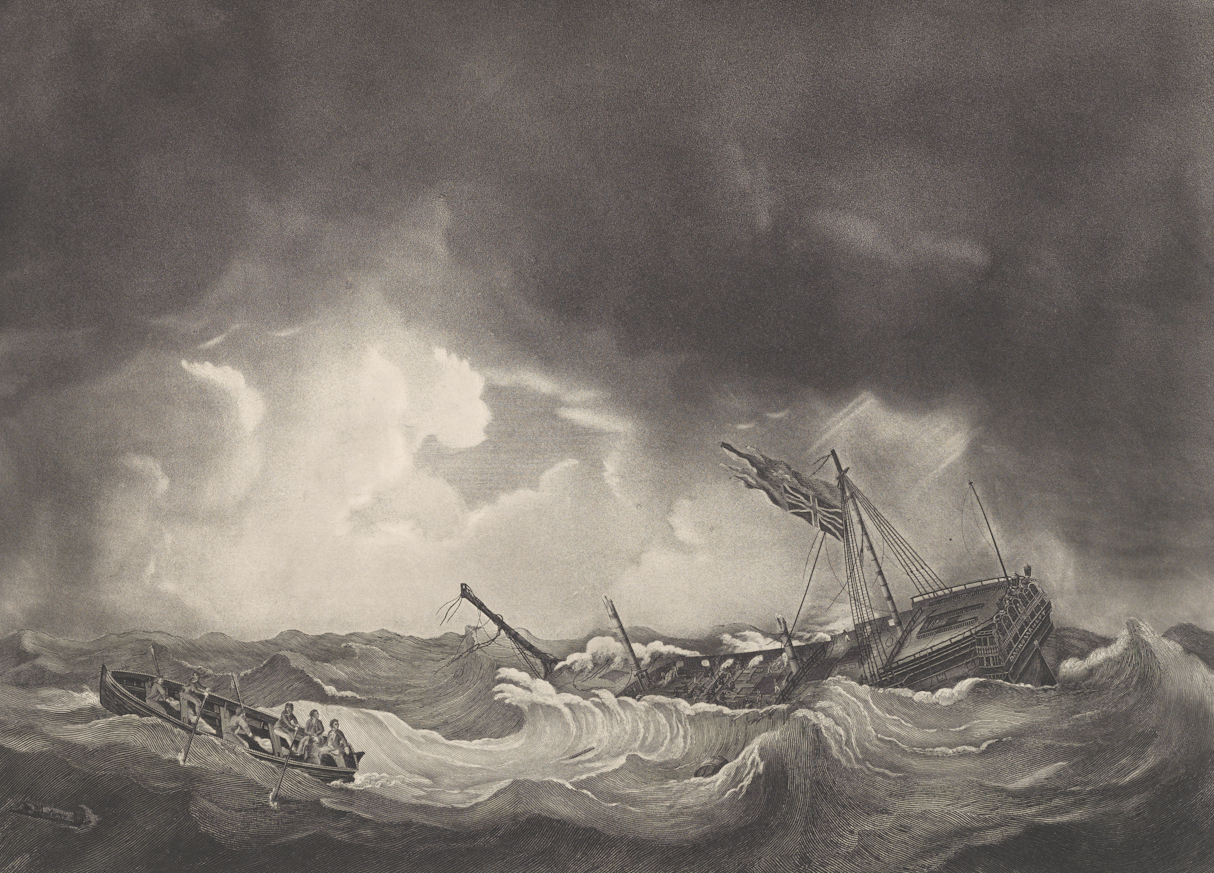
- Dankbaarheid by engravers Francis Jukes and John Peltro after Thomas Luny. Now part of the Royal Museums Greenwich collection

History

Dutch Republic
- Name: Dankbaarheid
- Owner: Dutch East India Company; Chamber of Rotterdam
- Completed: 1772
- Captured: 21 July 1781

Great Britain
- Acquired: 21 July 1781
- Out of service: 30 January 1782
- Fate: Sank on 30 January 1782 in the Indian Ocean

General characteristics
- Length: 150 feet
- Capacity: loading capacity: 850 tons
- Crew: 217-250

Dankbaarheid, also written as Dankbaarheit or Dankbaarheyt, was an 18th-century East Indiaman of the Dutch East India Company.

Dankbaarheid was a merchant ship and made multiple voyages from Goeree, Dutch Republic to Batavia, the Dutch East Indies. In 1781 she was captured by the Royal Navy during the Battle of Saldanha Bay. In 1782 she sank in a gale in the Indian Ocean.

== Ship details ==
Dankbaarheid was built in 1772 in Rotterdam for the Chamber of Rotterdam. She was made of wood, 150 feet long and had a loading capacity of 850 tons. The ship had 24 guns.

The ship has the name Dankbaarheid; that is the Dutch word for gratitude.

== History and fate ==
On 13 December 1773, departing from Goeree, she made her first voyage to Batavia under command of Joachim Ernst Wend. She had an intermediate stop at Cape of Good Hope for three weeks from April to May 1774 and arrived at Batavia on 26 July 1774. Three months later, in October 1774 she returned to Goeree, where she arrived via Cape of Good Hope in May 1775.

She made a second, similar, voyage from Goeree to Batavia again under command of Joachim Ernst Wend and via Cape of Good Hope between 18 May 1776 and 27 November 1776.

=== Capture ===
On 20 January 1781 she departed to Asia and had an intermediate stop at Cape of Good Hope from 25 April 1781 to 14 May 1781. Later in 1781 she returned from China to the Dutch Republic under command of Hendrik Steetsel with a cargo value of ƒ 427,490 (Rotterdam), 353,265 (Delft), and 130 (Amsterdam). As part of the Fourth Anglo-Dutch War during the Battle of Saldanha Bay a squadron of Royal Navy warships under the command of commodore George Johnstone captured Dankbaarheid losing on passage to England. Also four other Dutch East India Company ships were captured.

=== Fate ===
Dankbaerheid was lost on 30 January 1782 as the result of a gale at the mouth of the Channel in the Indian Ocean. At insistence of the crew, the English skipper had left the ship together with several sailors and three small children. Another sources states that the British crew on Dankbaerheid were able to escape and reached Lisbon in safety. The British had insured their prizes so when Dankbaerheid was lost in transit to Britain the captors still benefited from the insurance money.

== Depictions ==
Engravers Francis Jukes and John Peltro made a depiction of the sinking ship with the lifeboat after Thomas Luny (see infobox). A print is in the collection of the Royal Museums Greenwich collection and another one is part of the collection of the Scheepvaart Museum, the largest Dutch maritime museum in Amsterdam.
