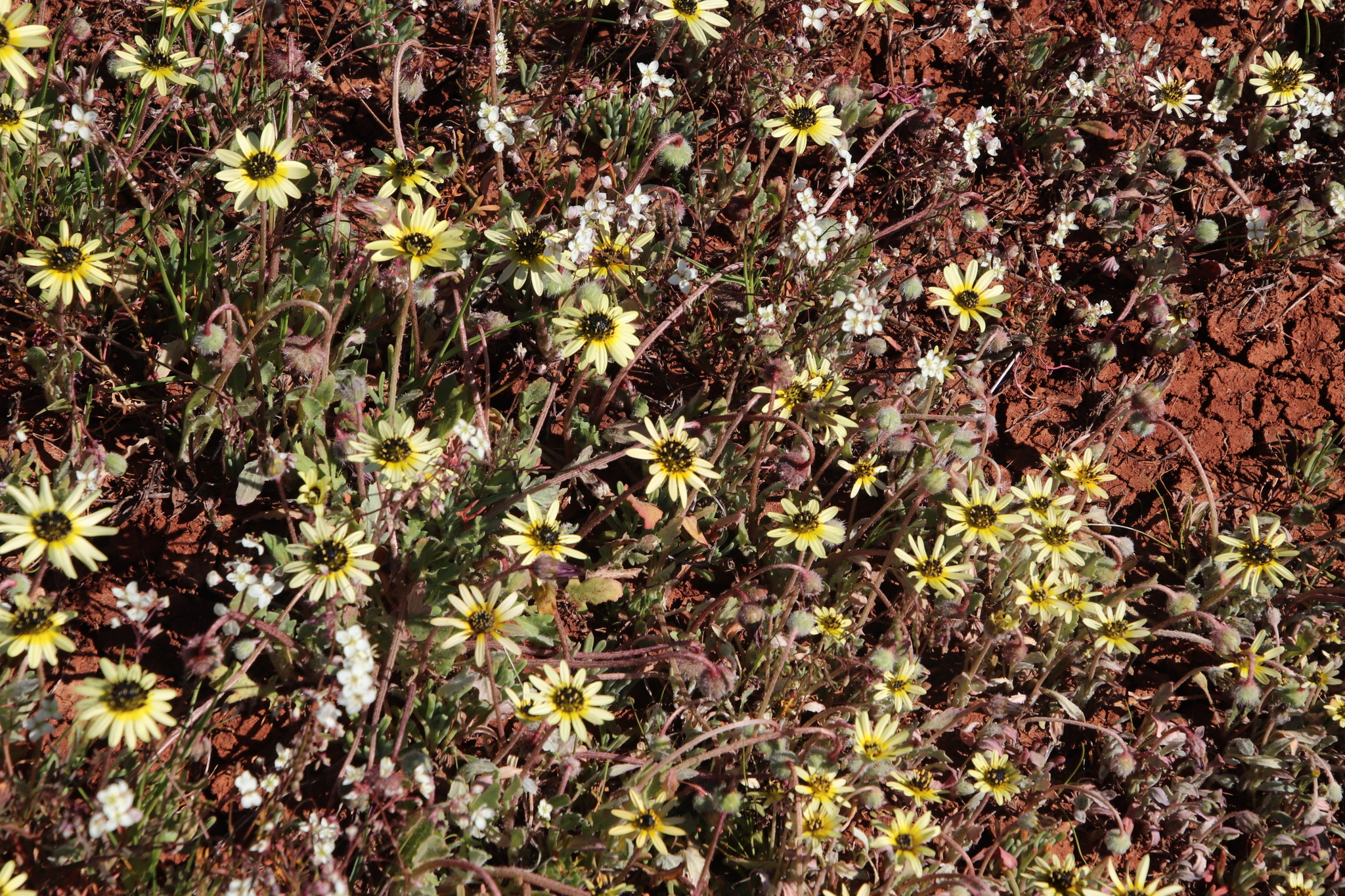
- Arctotis sulcocarpa in South Africa

Conservation status
- Least Concern (IUCN 3.1)

Scientific classification
- Kingdom: Plantae
- Clade: Tracheophytes
- Clade: Angiosperms
- Clade: Eudicots
- Clade: Asterids
- Order: Asterales
- Family: Asteraceae
- Genus: Arctotis
- Species: A. sulcocarpa

Binomial name
- Arctotis sulcocarpa K.Lewin

= Arctotis sulcocarpa =

Species of plant

Arctotis sulcocarpa is a plant belonging to the genus Arctotis. The species is endemic to the Northern Cape and occurs from the Bokkeveldberge escarpment, east of Nieuwoudtville to the Roggeveldberge escarpment near Sutherland. It is part of the fynbos.
