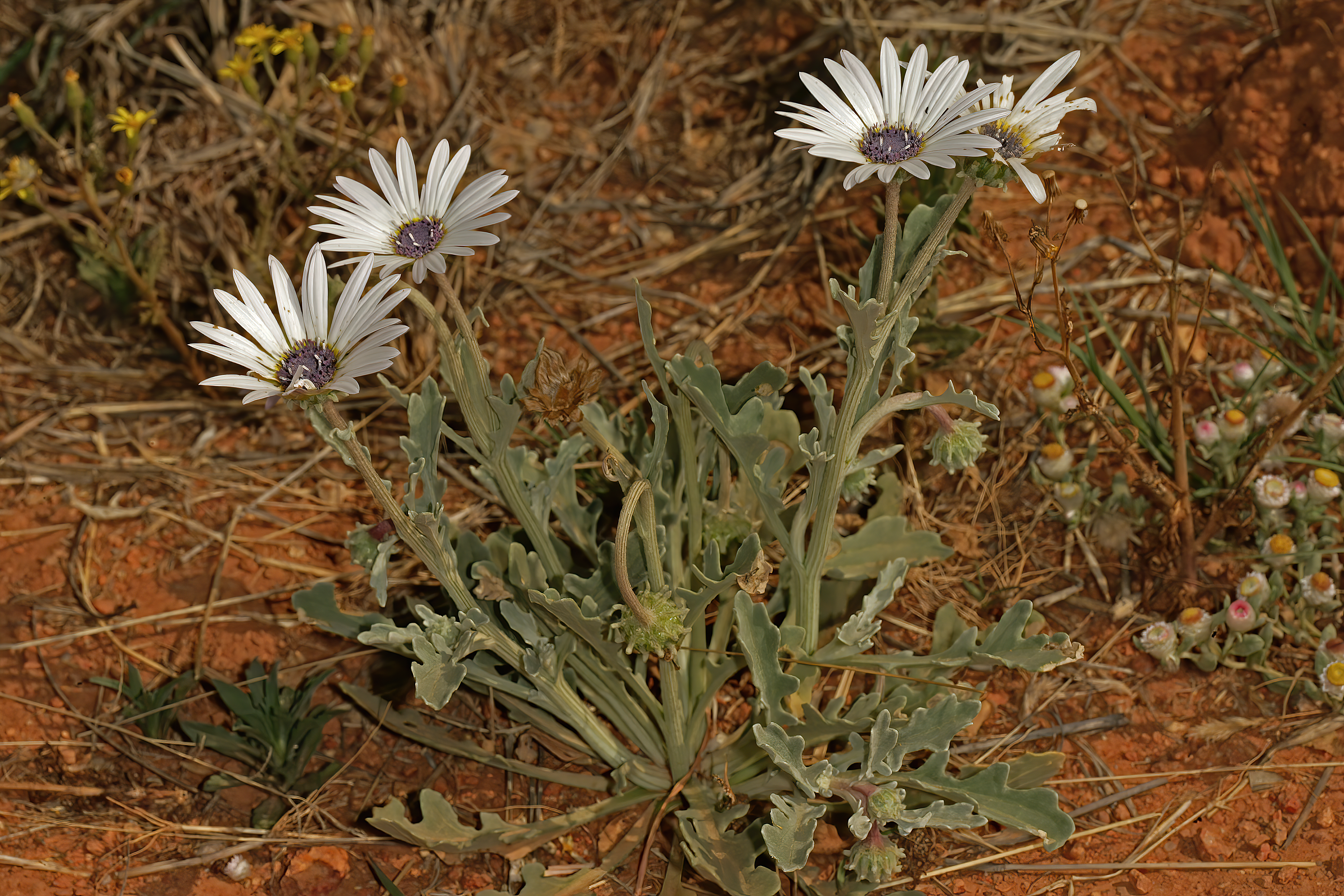

Scientific classification
- Kingdom: Plantae
- Clade: Embryophytes
- Clade: Tracheophytes
- Clade: Angiosperms
- Clade: Eudicots
- Clade: Asterids
- Order: Asterales
- Family: Asteraceae
- Genus: Arctotis
- Species: A. venusta

Binomial name
- Arctotis venusta Norl. (1965)

= Arctotis venusta =

Species of plant

Arctotis venusta is a species of South African plants in the family Asteraceae. Common names include silver arctotis, kusgousblom, and blue-eyed African daisy. It is native to South Africa (Cape Provinces, Free State, and Northern Provinces), Lesotho, Botswana, Namibia, and Zimbabwe. The species is widely cultivated as an ornamental, and has become naturalized in parts of the United States (California, Arizona, South Carolina), Australia, and Central and South America, where it has escaped from gardens to become a noxious weed.

Arctotis venusta is grown as a ground cover because of its silvery foliage and showy flower heads. It is adaptable to many conditions and is sometimes used to control erosion. It is a perennial with stout, woolly stems and aromatic, violin-shaped, heavily lobed leaves. The flower heads have many creamy-white to pink or bronze ray florets with lavender to reddish undersides and centers filled with purple disc florets. The fruit is a hard achene with a tuft of plumelike hairs on one end and an array of pappus scales on the other.

The species is sometimes regarded as the same species as the rare A. stoechadifolia, but authors separate the two as distinct species.
