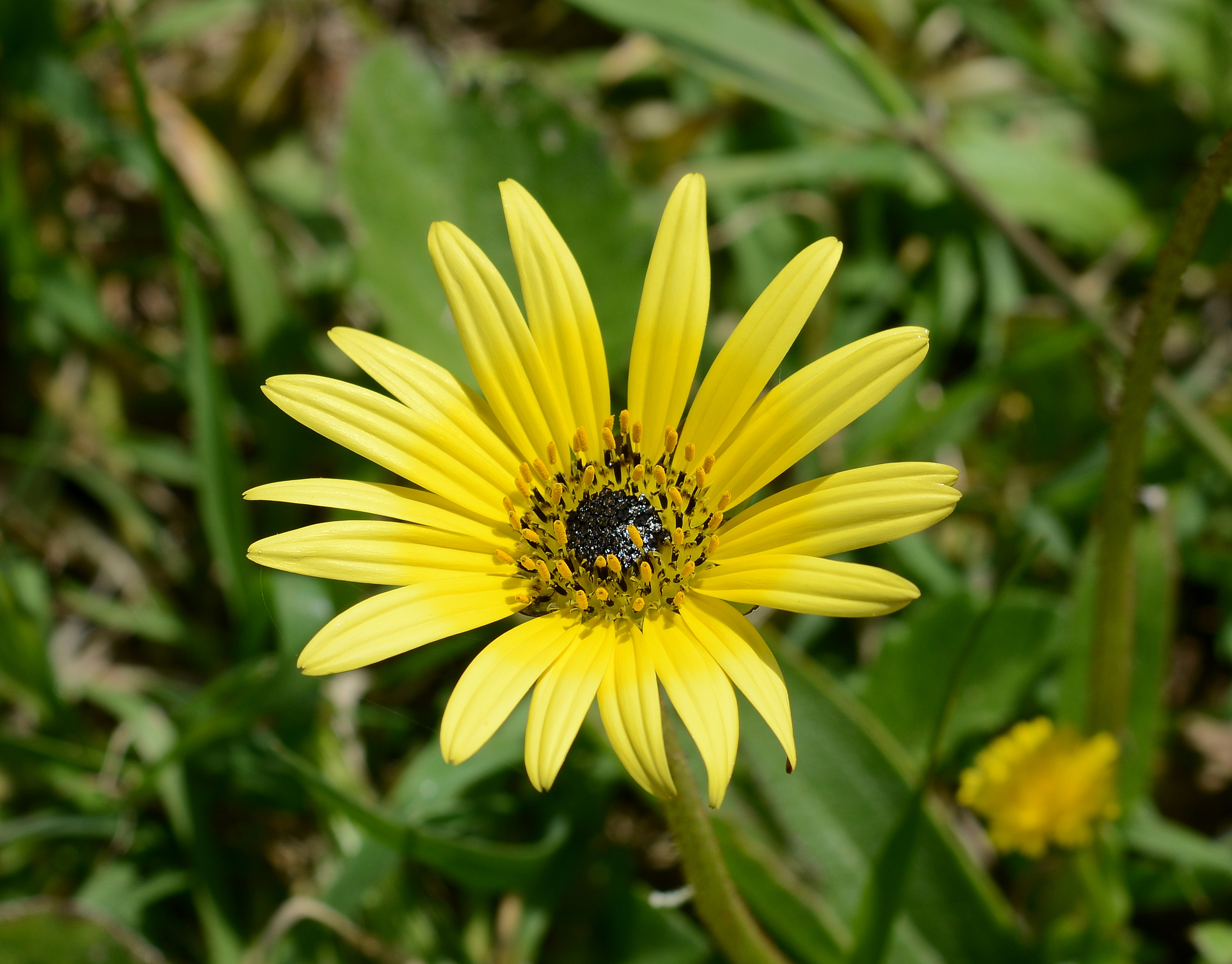
- Arctotis flower head

Scientific classification
- Kingdom: Plantae
- Clade: Tracheophytes
- Clade: Angiosperms
- Clade: Eudicots
- Clade: Asterids
- Order: Asterales
- Family: Asteraceae
- Subfamily: Vernonioideae
- Tribe: Arctotideae
- Subtribe: Arctotidinae
- Genus: Arctotis; L.

Type species
- Arctotis angustifolia L.

Synonyms
- Antrospermum Sch.Bip.; Anemonospermos Boerh. ex Boehm.; Cleitria Schrad.; Stegonotus Cass.; Anemonospermos Möhring ex Adans.; Venidium Less.; Odontoptera Cass.; Anemonospermos Möhring ex Kuntze

= Arctotis =

Genus of plants

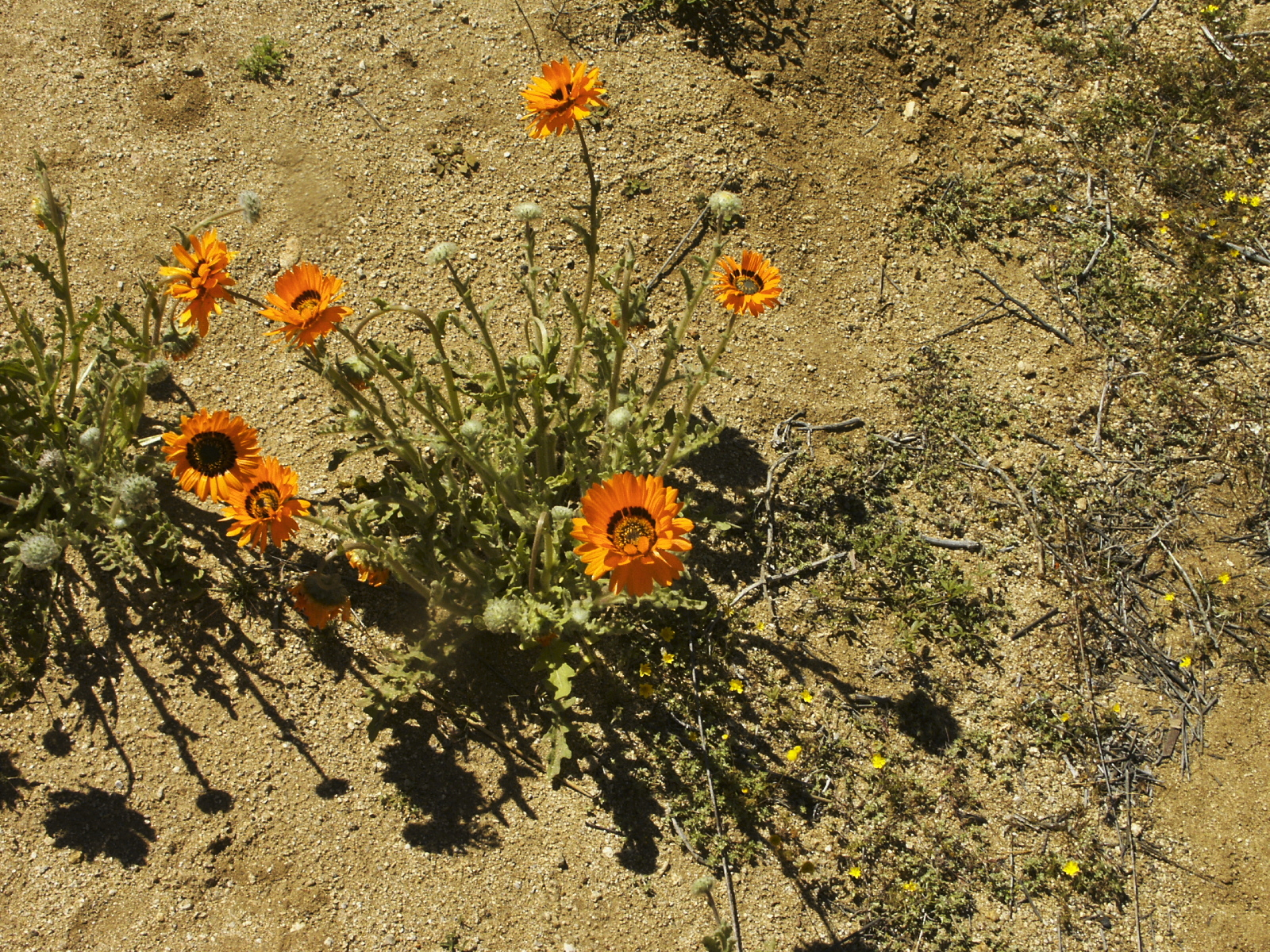
Namaqualand Gousblom (Arctotis fastuosa) Goegap N.R., Namaqualand, Northern Cape, South Africa

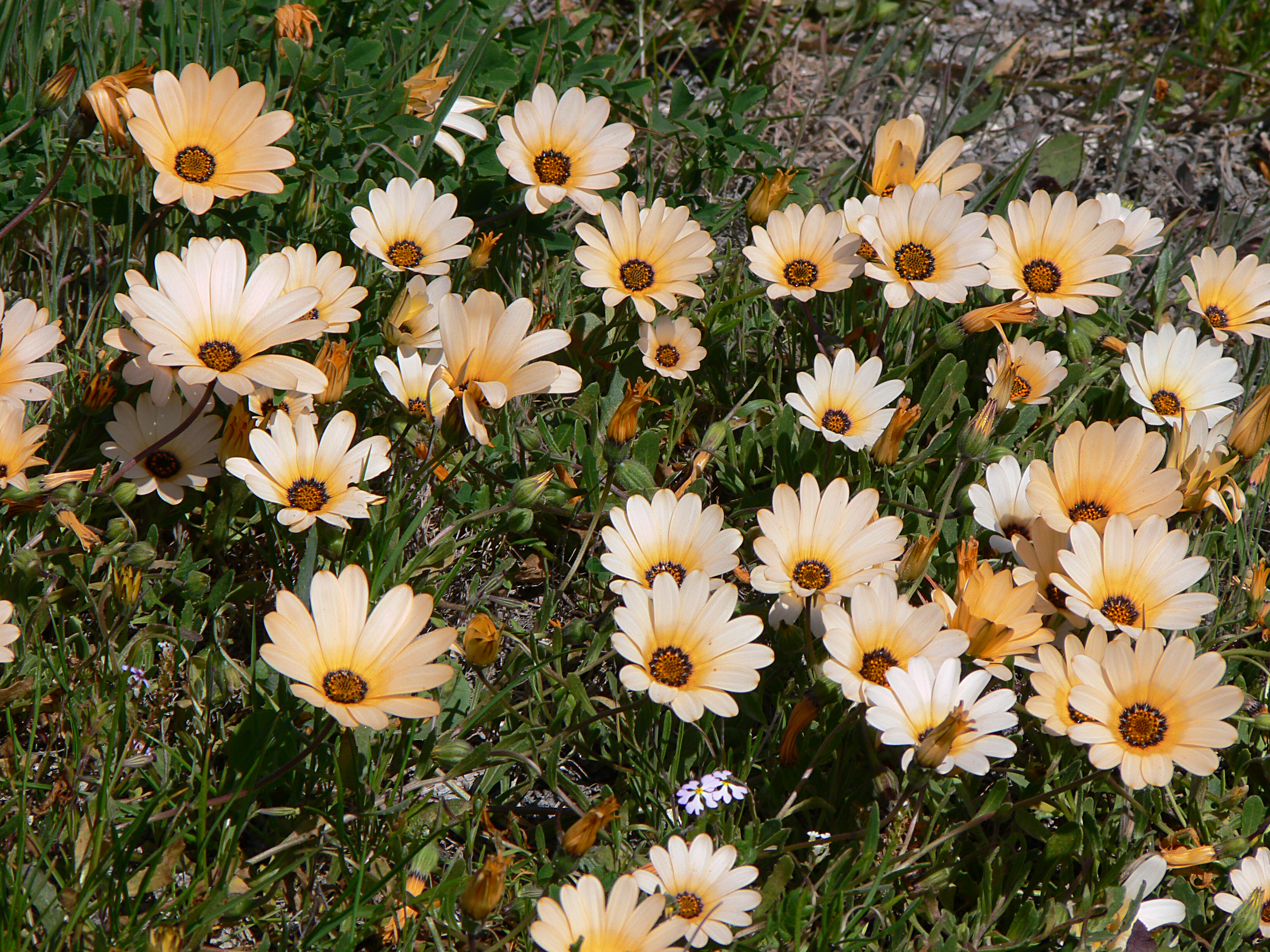
Arctotis stoechadifolia P. J. Bergius, West Coast National Park, Western Cape, South Africa

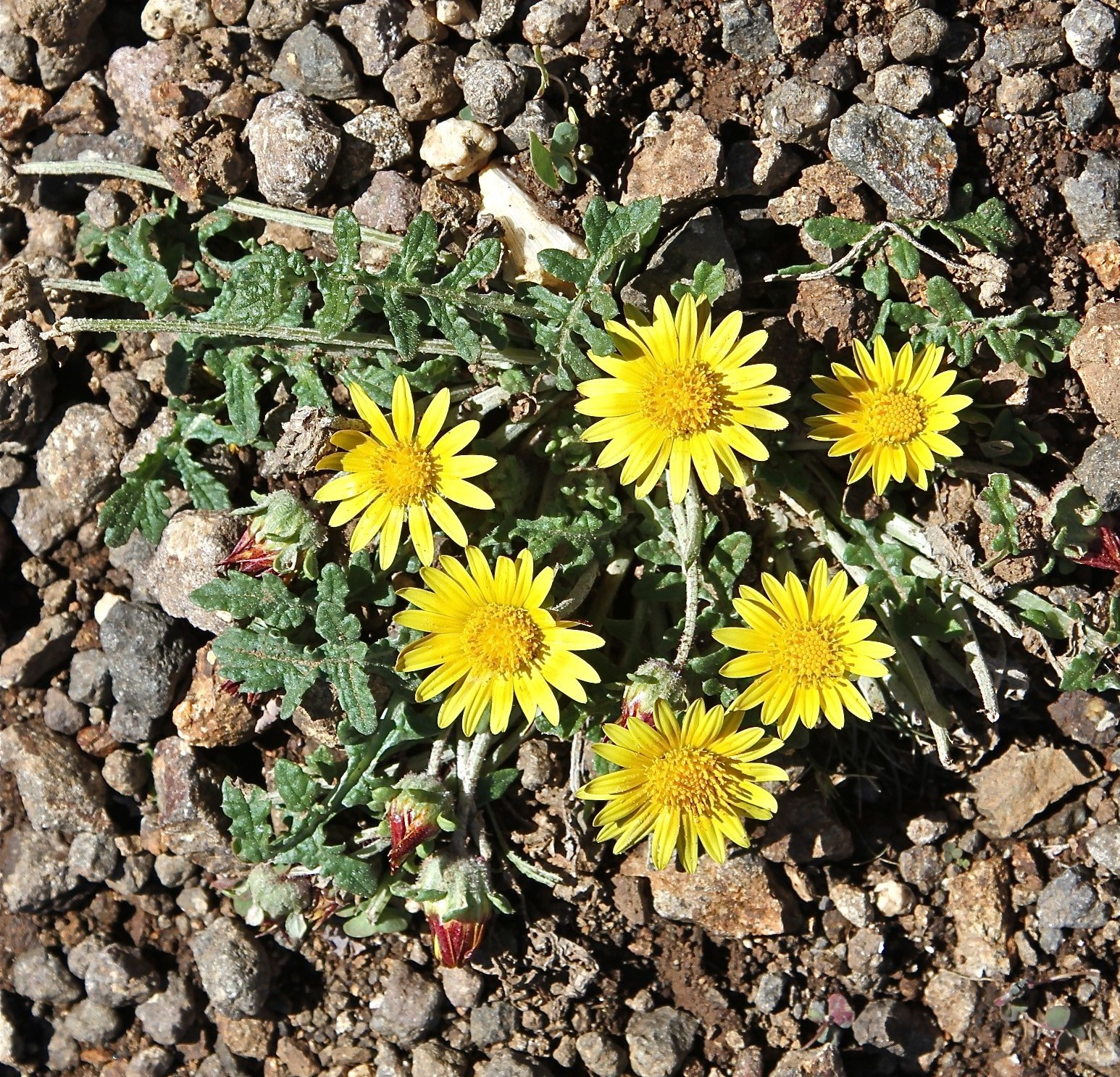
Arctotis arctoides. Sani Pass, Drakensberg, ZA

Arctotis is a genus of annual and perennial plants in the family Asteraceae.

Arctotis is native to dry stony slopes in southern Africa. Some of the plants are alternatively placed in the genus Venidium. The common name is "African daisy", or "Gousblom" in Afrikaans. These plants have daisy-like composite flowers which tend to close in the late afternoon or in dull weather, but numerous cultivars have been developed for garden use which stay open for longer, and are available in a wide range of colours. Tender perennials are often grown in temperate regions as half-hardy annuals.

The garden hybrid A. × hybrida hort. 'Flame' has gained the Royal Horticultural Society's Award of Garden Merit.

Vigorous Arctotis hybrids like 'Pink Sugar' and 'Large Marge' are popular choices for garden design for the diverse colors of their blooms.

== Species ==
- Arctotis acaulis L.
- Arctotis acuminata K.Lewin
- Arctotis adpressa DC.
- Arctotis aenea J.Jacq.
- Arctotis amplexicans Less.
- Arctotis amplexicaulis Less.
- Arctotis angustifolia L.
- Arctotis arctotoides (L.f.) O.Hoffm.
- Arctotis argentea Thunb.
- Arctotis aspera L.
- Arctotis auriculata Jacq.
- Arctotis bellidiastrum (S.Moore) Lewin
- Arctotis bellidifolia P.J.Bergius
- Arctotis bolusii (S.Moore) Lewin
- Arctotis campanulata DC.
- Arctotis candida Thunb.
- Arctotis caudata K.Lewin
- Arctotis crispata Hutch.
- Arctotis cuneata DC.
- Arctotis cuprea Jacq.
- Arctotis debensis R.J.Mckenzie
- Arctotis decurrens Jacq.
- Arctotis diffusa Thunb.
- Arctotis discolor (Less.) Beauverd
- Arctotis dregei Turcz.
- Arctotis elongata Thunb.
- Arctotis erosa (Harv.) Beauverd
- Arctotis fastuosa Jacq
- Arctotis flaccida Jacq.
- Arctotis fosteri N.E.Br.
- Arctotis frutescens Norl.
- Arctotis gigantea A.Rich.
- Arctotis gowerae E.Phillips
- Arctotis graminea K.Lewin
- Arctotis gumbletonii Hook.f.
- Arctotis hirsuta (Harv.) Beauverd
- Arctotis hispidula (Less.) Beauverd
- Arctotis incisa Thunb.
- Arctotis laciniata Lam.
- Arctotis laevis Thunb.
- Arctotis lanceolata Harv.
- Arctotis leiocarpa Harv.
- Arctotis leptorhiza DC.
- Arctotis leucanthemoides Jacq.
- Arctotis linearis Thunb.
- Arctotis macrosperma (DC.) Beauverd
- Arctotis microcephala (DC.) Beauverd
- Arctotis perfoliata (Less.) Beauverd
- Arctotis petiolata Thunb.
- Arctotis pinnatifida Thunb.
- Arctotis pusilla DC.
- Arctotis reptans Jacq.
- Arctotis revoluta Jacq.
- Arctotis rotundifolia K.Lewin
- Arctotis scabra Thunb.
- Arctotis schlechteri K.Lewin
- Arctotis schraderi (DC.) Beauverd
- Arctotis semipapposa (DC.) Beauverd
- Arctotis serpens (S.Moore) Lewin
- Arctotis sessilifolia K.Lewin
- Arctotis setosa K.Lewin
- Arctotis stoechadifolia P.J.Bergius
- Arctotis suffruticosa K.Lewin
- Arctotis sulcocarpa K.Lewin
- Arctotis tricolor Jacq.
- Arctotis undulata Jacq.
- Arctotis venidioides DC.
- Arctotis venusta Norl.
- Arctotis virgata Jacq.
