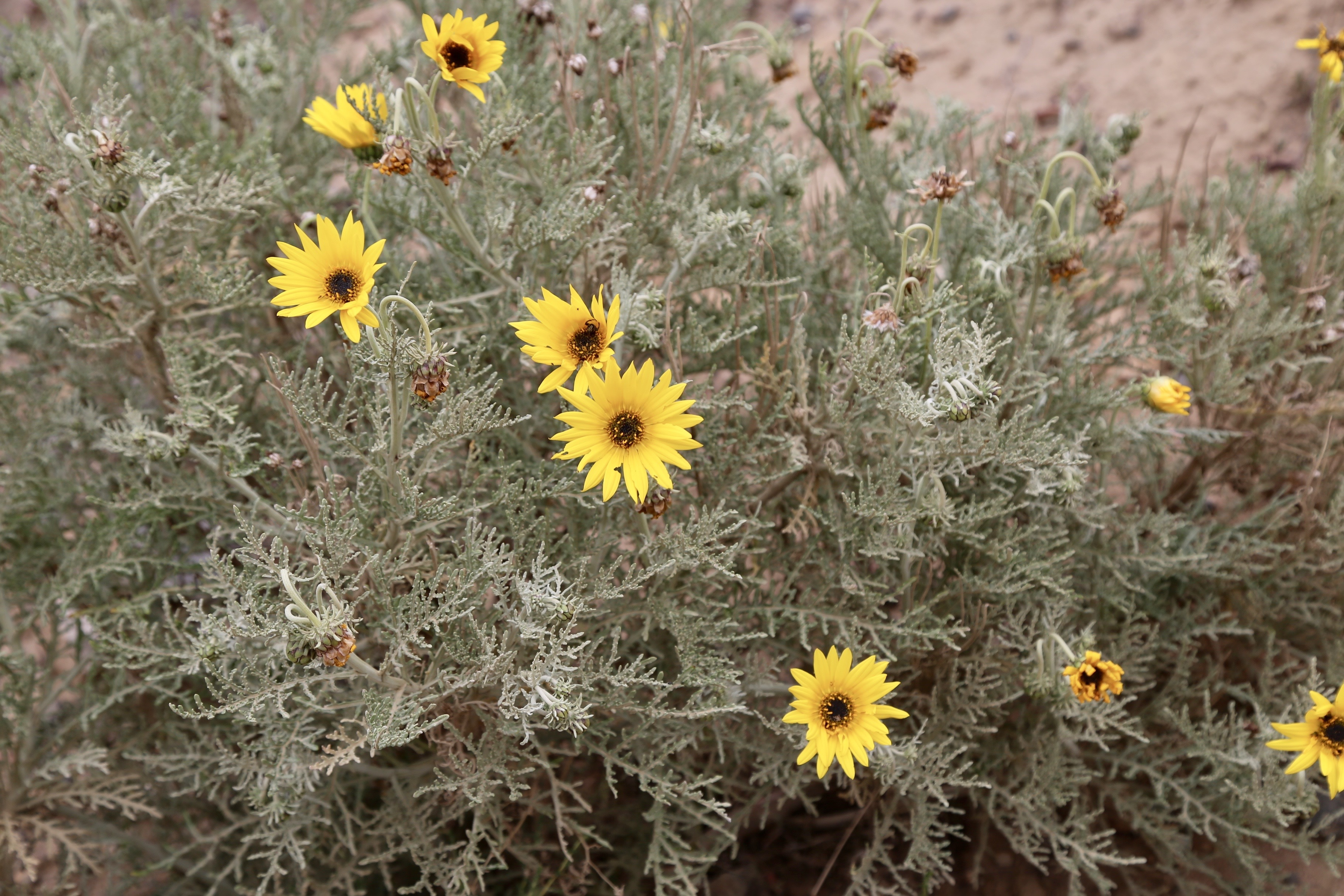

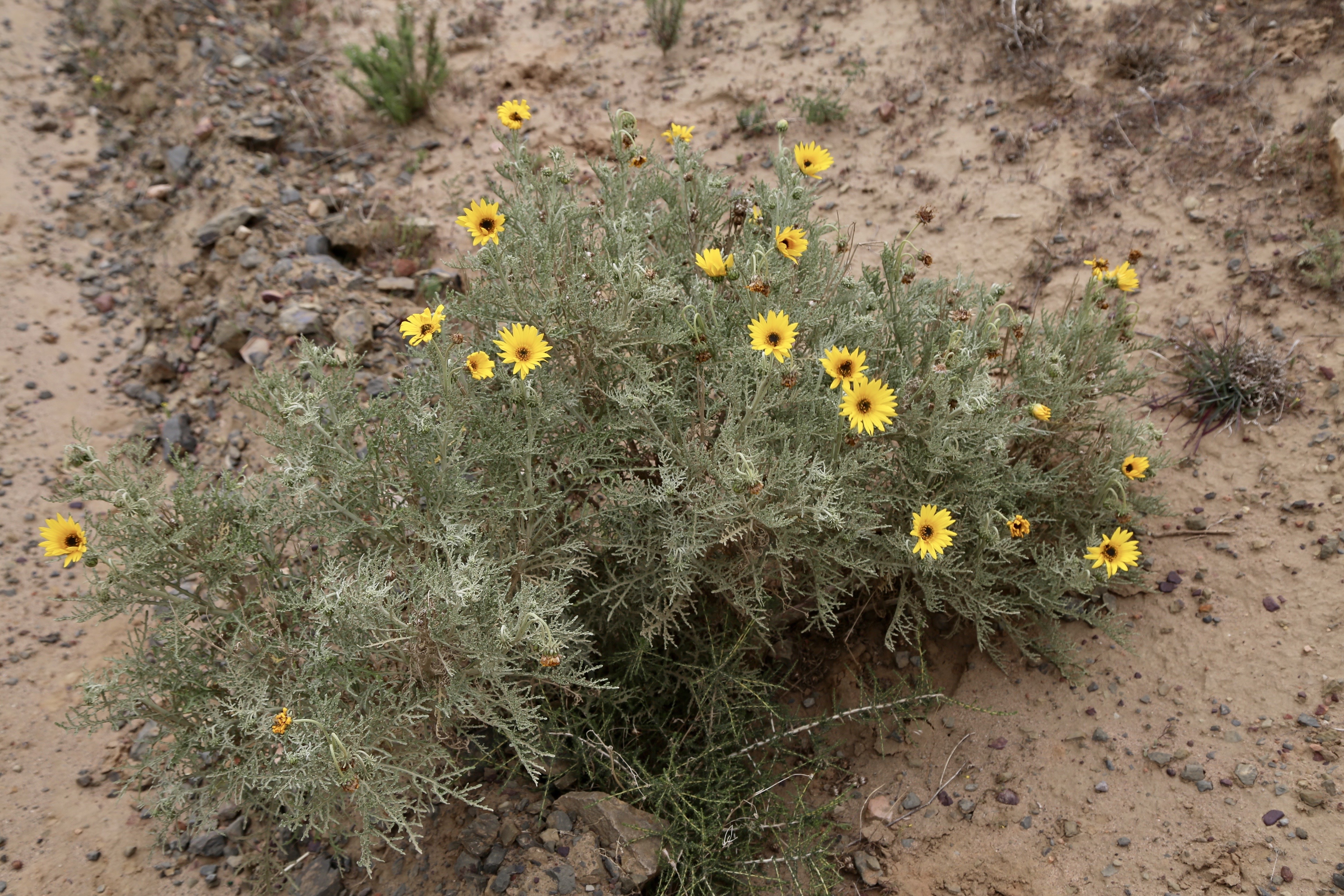

Scientific classification
- Kingdom: Plantae
- Clade: Tracheophytes
- Clade: Angiosperms
- Clade: Eudicots
- Clade: Asterids
- Order: Asterales
- Family: Asteraceae
- Genus: Arctotis
- Species: A. revoluta

Binomial name
- Arctotis revoluta Jacq., (1797)

Synonyms
- Anemonospermos aenea (J.Jacq.) Kuntze; Anemonospermos glaucophylla (Jacq.) Kuntze; Anemonospermos revoluta (Jacq.) Kuntze; Arctotis aenea J.Jacq.; Arctotis candida Thunb.; Arctotis cineraria Jacq.; Arctotis cuprea Steud.; Arctotis glaucophylla Jacq.; Arctotis grandiflora Jacq.; Arctotis laevis f. grandiflora Voss; Arctotis massoniana Spreng.; Arctotis revoluta var. fruticosa DC.

= Arctotis revoluta =

Species of plant

Arctotis revoluta is a plant belonging to the genus Arctotis. The species is endemic to the Northern Cape and the Western Cape.
