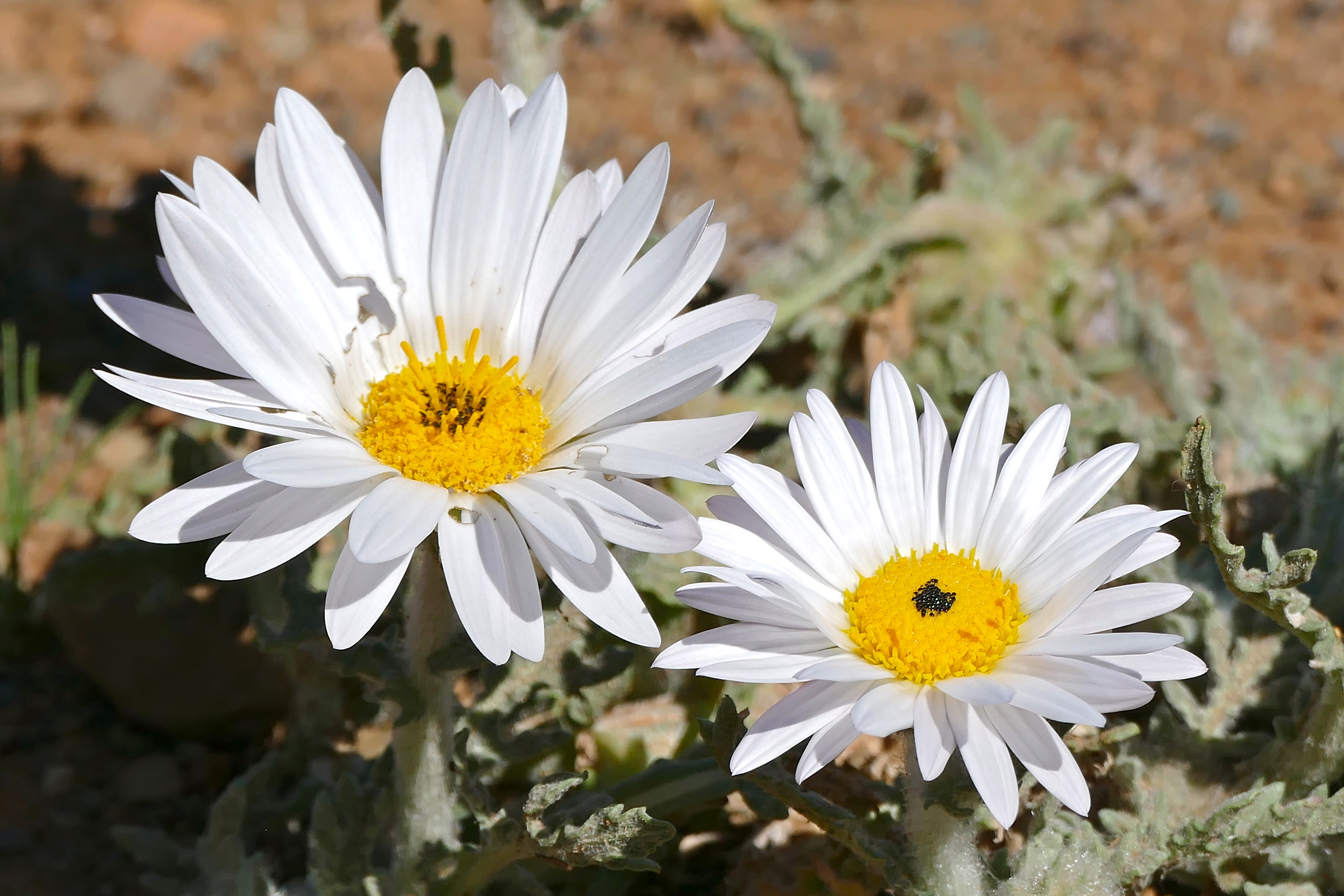

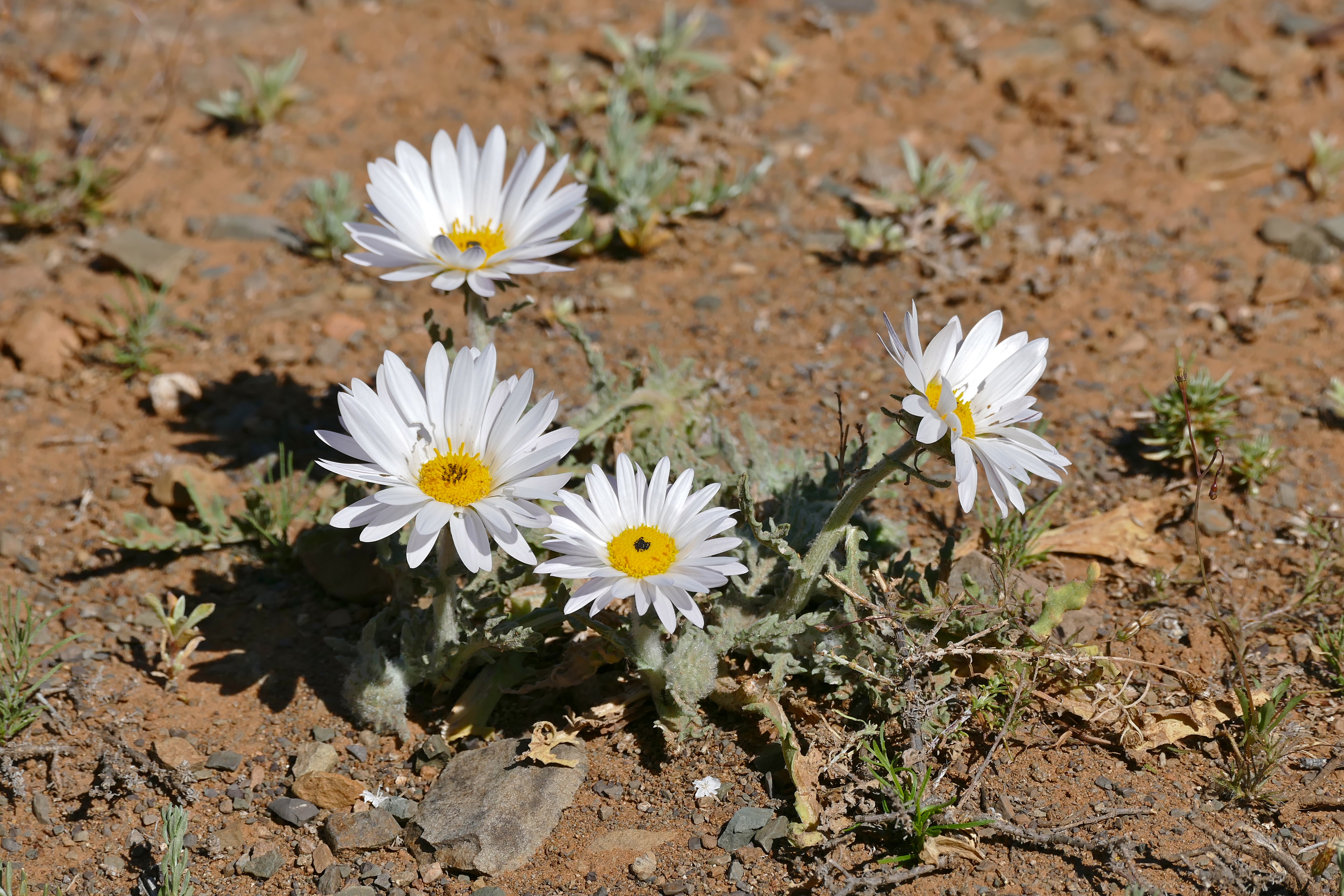

Scientific classification
- Kingdom: Plantae
- Clade: Embryophytes
- Clade: Tracheophytes
- Clade: Spermatophytes
- Clade: Angiosperms
- Clade: Eudicots
- Clade: Asterids
- Order: Asterales
- Family: Asteraceae
- Genus: Arctotis
- Species: A. leiocarpa

Binomial name
- Arctotis leiocarpa Harv.

Synonyms
- Anemonospermos leiocarpa Kuntze; Arctotis karasmontana Dinter; Arctotis macrostylis K.Lewin; Arctotis microcephala S.Moore

= Arctotis leiocarpa =

Species of plant

Arctotis leiocarpa, the Karoo daisy, is a plant that belongs to the genus Arctotis. The species is native to Namibia, Northern Cape, Eastern Cape and the Western Cape.
