= Arctotis angustifolia =

Scientific classification
- Kingdom: Plantae
- Clade: Tracheophytes
- Clade: Angiosperms
- Clade: Eudicots
- Clade: Asterids
- Order: Asterales
- Family: Asteraceae
- Genus: Arctotis
- Species: A. angustifolia

Binomial name
- Arctotis angustifolia L. (1753)

Species of plant

Arctotis angustifolia is a plant belonging to the genus Arctotis. The species is endemic to the Western Cape and occurs from the Cape Flats to Malmesbury and Kleinmond. It forms part of the fynbos. There are currently only two fragmented, subpopulations remaining, the total population is estimated at 250 plants. The species has lost large parts of its habitat to development, crop cultivation and invasive plants. The two existing subpopulations are threatened by further development and the cultivation of proteas.
