= Arctotis aspera =

Scientific classification
- Kingdom: Plantae
- Clade: Tracheophytes
- Clade: Angiosperms
- Clade: Eudicots
- Clade: Asterids
- Order: Asterales
- Family: Asteraceae
- Genus: Arctotis
- Species: A. aspera

Binomial name
- Arctotis aspera L.

Synonyms
- Anemonospermos aspera Kuntze; Anemonospermos glandulosa Kuntze; Arctotis angustifolia Jacq.; Arctotis arborescens Jacq.; Arctotis aspera var. arborescens (Jacq.) DC.; Arctotis aspera var. scabra P.J.Bergius; Arctotis bicolor Willd.; Arctotis carduifolia Burm.f.; Arctotis jacobaea Sch.Bip.; Arctotis leucantha Hoffmanns.; Arctotis lyrata Willd.; Arctotis maculata Jacq.; Arctotis sulphurea Salisb.; Odontoptera sulphurea Cass.

Species of plant

Arctotis aspera, the rough arctotis, is a plant belonging to the genus Arctotis. The species is endemic to the Western Cape.
