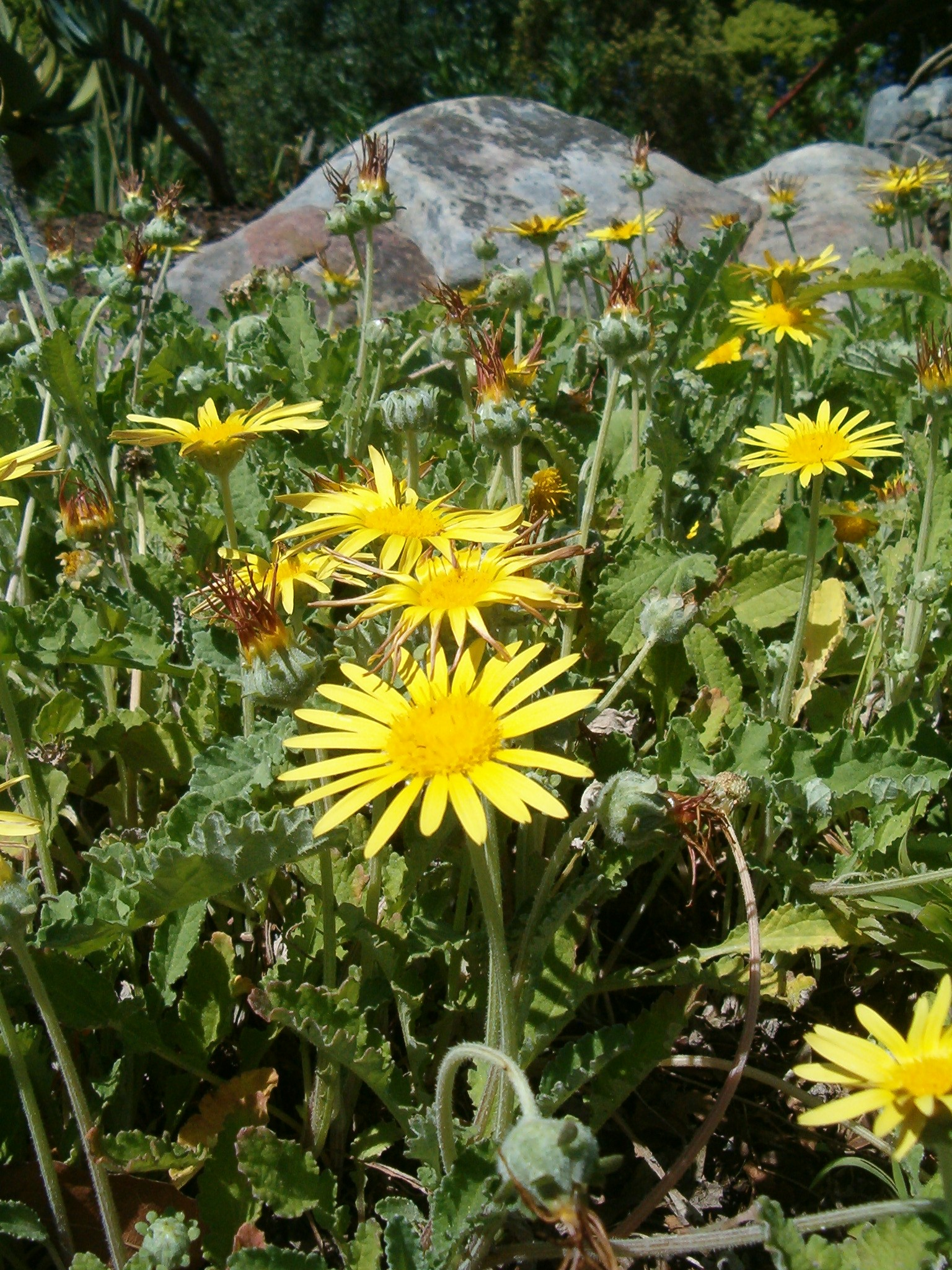

Scientific classification
- Kingdom: Plantae
- Clade: Tracheophytes
- Clade: Angiosperms
- Clade: Eudicots
- Clade: Asterids
- Order: Asterales
- Family: Asteraceae
- Genus: Arctotis
- Species: A. arctotoides

Binomial name
- Arctotis arctotoides O.Hoffm. (1910)

Synonyms
- Arctotis arctotoides K.Lewin; Arctotis spathuligera O.Hoffm.; Osteospermum arctotioides L.f.; Venidium arctotoides Less.; Venidium decurrens Less.

= Arctotis arctotoides =

Species of plant

Arctotis arctotoides is a plant belonging to the genus Arctotis. The species is native to Lesotho, Namibia and South Africa.
