= Arctotis debensis =

Scientific classification
- Kingdom: Plantae
- Clade: Tracheophytes
- Clade: Angiosperms
- Clade: Eudicots
- Clade: Asterids
- Order: Asterales
- Family: Asteraceae
- Genus: Arctotis
- Species: A. debensis

Binomial name
- Arctotis debensis R.J.McKenzie, (2006)

Species of plant

Arctotis debensis is a plant belonging to the genus Arctotis. The species is endemic to the Eastern Cape and occurs from King William's Town to the Prairie Forest. It has a range of only 186 km^{2} and has already lost 30% of its habitat to development, overgrazing and crop cultivation. The threats still exist.
