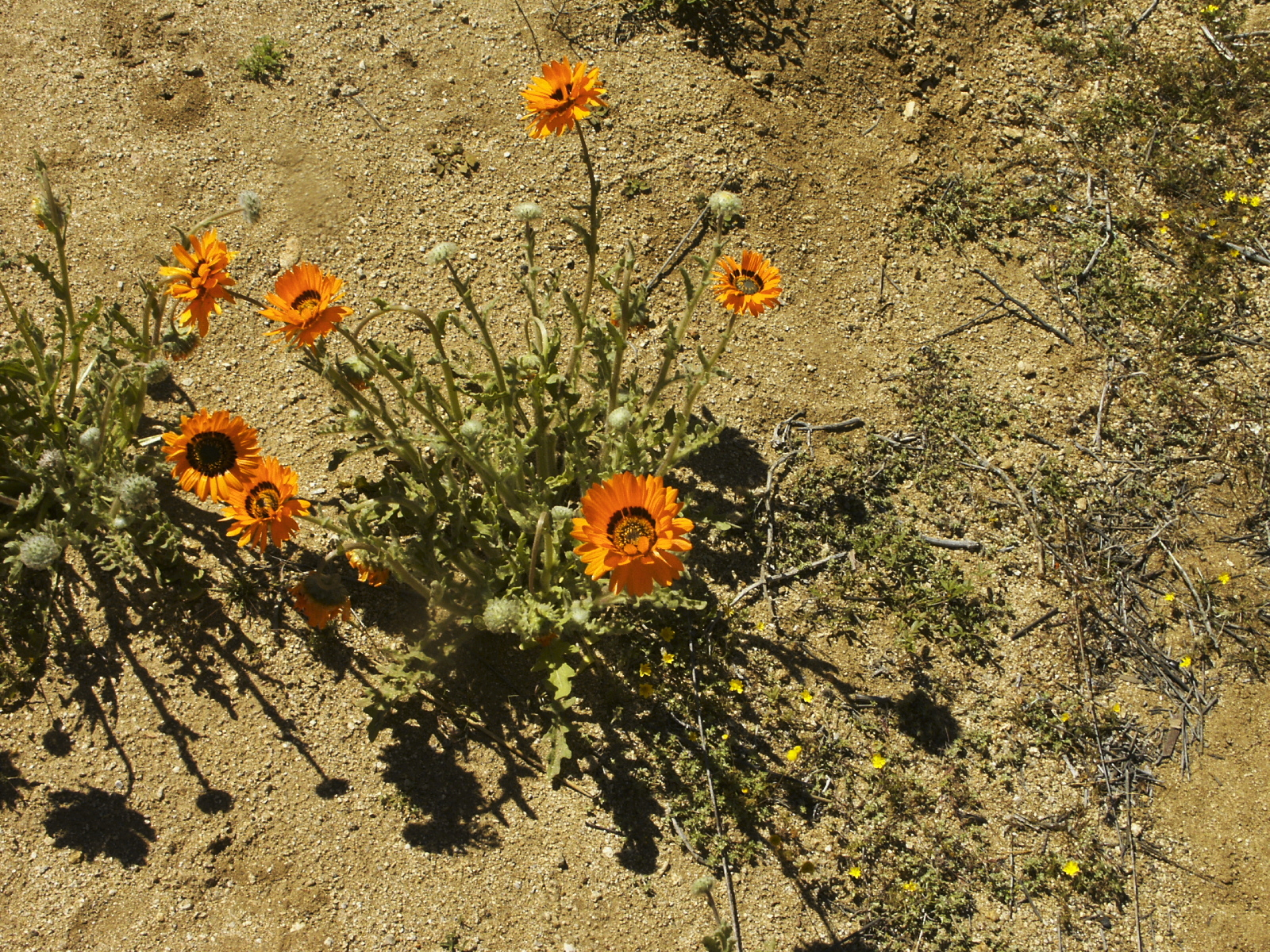

Scientific classification
- Kingdom: Plantae
- Clade: Tracheophytes
- Clade: Angiosperms
- Clade: Eudicots
- Clade: Asterids
- Order: Asterales
- Family: Asteraceae
- Genus: Arctotis
- Species: A. fastuosa

Binomial name
- Arctotis fastuosa Jacq.

Synonyms
- Synonymy: Anemonospermos fastuosa Kuntze; Arctotis aurea (DC.) Beauverd; Arctotis maximiliani Schltr. ex Dinter; Arctotis maximiliani Schltr. ex Beauverd; Arctotis spinulosa Jacq.; Arctotis wyleyi (Harv.) Beauverd; Venidium aureum DC.; Venidium fastuosum (Jacq.) Stapf; Venidium wyleyi Harv.

= Arctotis fastuosa =

Monarch-of-the-veld

Species of flowering plant

Arctotis fastuosa, called Monarch-of-the-veld, is a species of African plants in the family Asteraceae, native to Namibia and South Africa. It has become naturalized on roadsides and in vacant urban lots in southern California.

Arctotis fastuosa is cultivated as an ornamental plant for its showy flowers. It is an annual herb growing up to about 35 centimeters in height, but known to approach 90 centimeters (36 inches) at times. It is hairy in texture, the hairs long and webby when the plant is young. Leaves occur in basal rosettes and are alternately arranged along the stem. They can be several centimeters long all but the uppermost are divided into several lobes. They are borne on flat petioles with wide bases. The inflorescence is a solitary flower head which can be large and showy, measuring up to 10 centimeters wide. Cultivars are bred for varied flower colors; the ray florets can be orange or white with purple, yellow, or orange bases, and the disc florets at the center can be brown, purple, or black.
