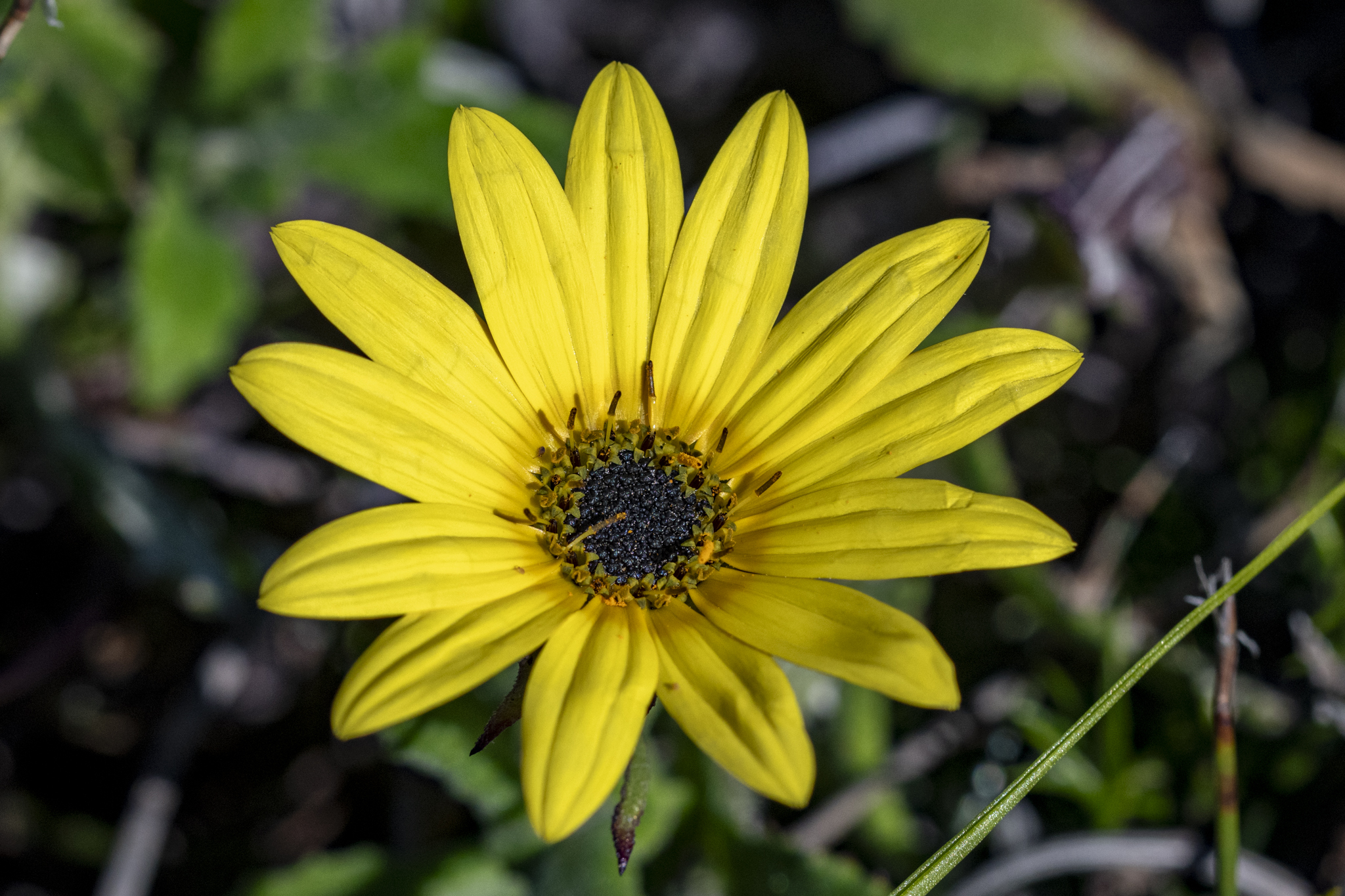

Scientific classification
- Kingdom: Plantae
- Clade: Embryophytes
- Clade: Tracheophytes
- Clade: Angiosperms
- Clade: Eudicots
- Clade: Asterids
- Order: Asterales
- Family: Asteraceae
- Genus: Arctotis
- Species: A. scabra

Binomial name
- Arctotis scabra Thunb., (1799)

Synonyms
- Arctotis macrosperma (DC.) Beauverd; Arctotis semipapposa (DC.) Beauverd; Arctotis semipapposa var. angustifolia (DC.) K.Lewin; Arctotis semipapposa var. scabra (Thunb.) K.Lewin; Arctotis sessilifolia K.Lewin; Arctotis tomentosa Thunb. ex DC.; Venidium angustifolium DC.; Venidium macrospermum DC.; Venidium plantagineum Druce; Venidium plantagineum var. angustius DC.; Venidium scabrum (Thunb.) Less.; Venidium semipapposum DC.; Venidium semipapposum var. scabrum (Thunb.) Harv.; Venidium subcalvum DC.; Venidium subcalvum var. ambiguum DC.

= Arctotis scabra =

Species of plant

Arctotis scabra is a plant belonging to the genus Arctotis. The species is endemic to the Western Cape.
