= Arctotis frutescens =

Conservation status
- Least Concern (IUCN 3.1)

Scientific classification
- Kingdom: Plantae
- Clade: Tracheophytes
- Clade: Angiosperms
- Clade: Eudicots
- Clade: Asterids
- Order: Asterales
- Family: Asteraceae
- Genus: Arctotis
- Species: A. frutescens

Binomial name
- Arctotis frutescens Norl.

Species of plant

Arctotis frutescens is a species of flowering plant in the family Asteraceae. It is found only in Namibia. Its natural habitat is rocky areas. It is threatened by habitat loss.
