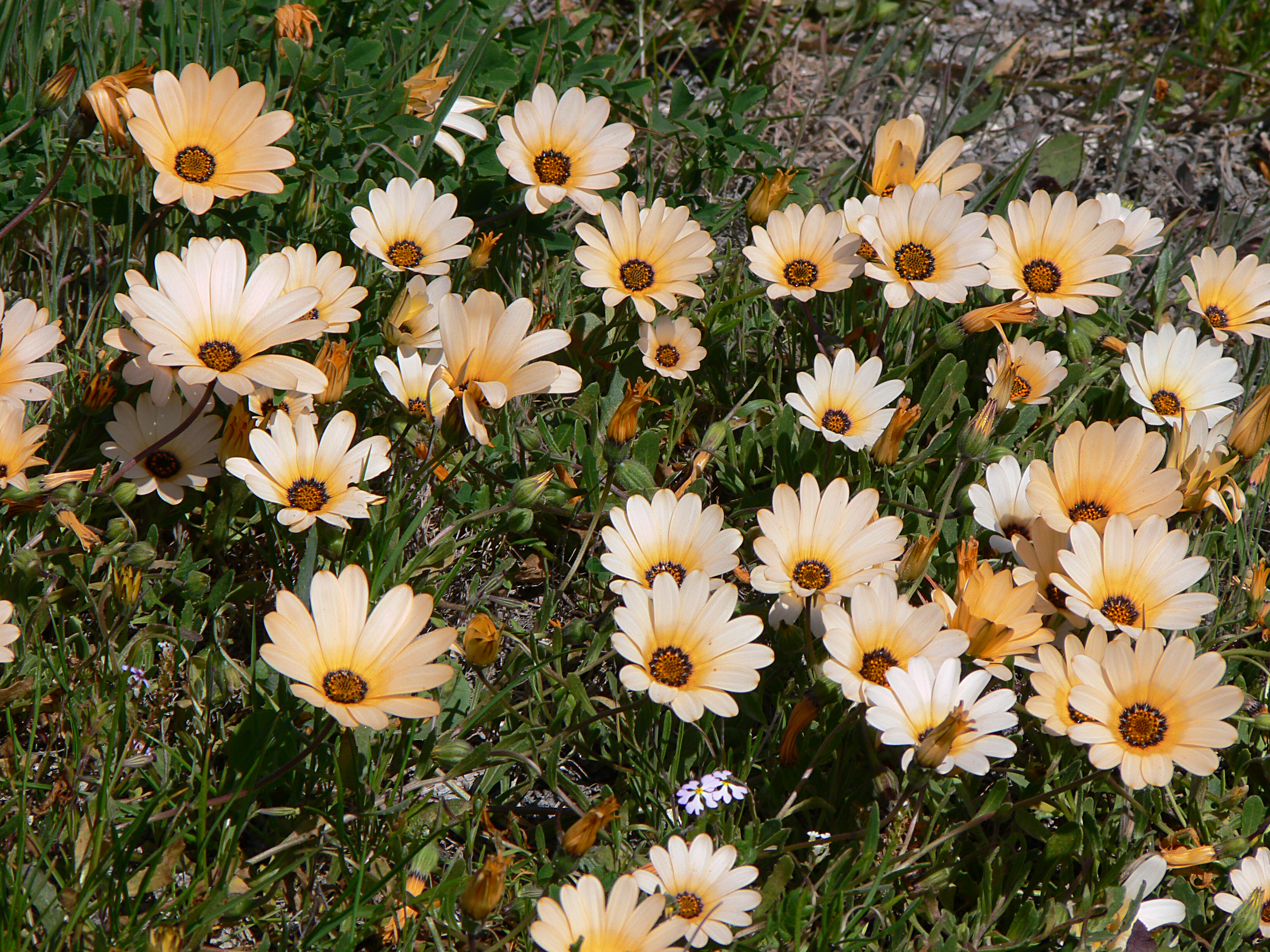

Scientific classification
- Kingdom: Plantae
- Clade: Tracheophytes
- Clade: Angiosperms
- Clade: Eudicots
- Clade: Asterids
- Order: Asterales
- Family: Asteraceae
- Genus: Arctotis
- Species: A. stoechadifolia

Binomial name
- Arctotis stoechadifolia P.J.Bergius

Synonyms
- Anemonospermos stoechadifolia Kuntze; Arctotis grandis (A.Berger) Thunb.; Arctotis rosea Less.; Arctotis rosea Jacq.

= Arctotis stoechadifolia =

Species of plant

Arctotis stoechadifolia, the African daisy or white arctotis, is a species of South African flowering plants in the family Asteraceae. It is a rare plant found only in its native range in sand dunes along the West coast of Cape Province. However, it has also been introduced in New Zealand.

The species is sometimes regarded as the same species as the much more common and widely cultivated A. venusta, but authors separate the two as distinct species.
