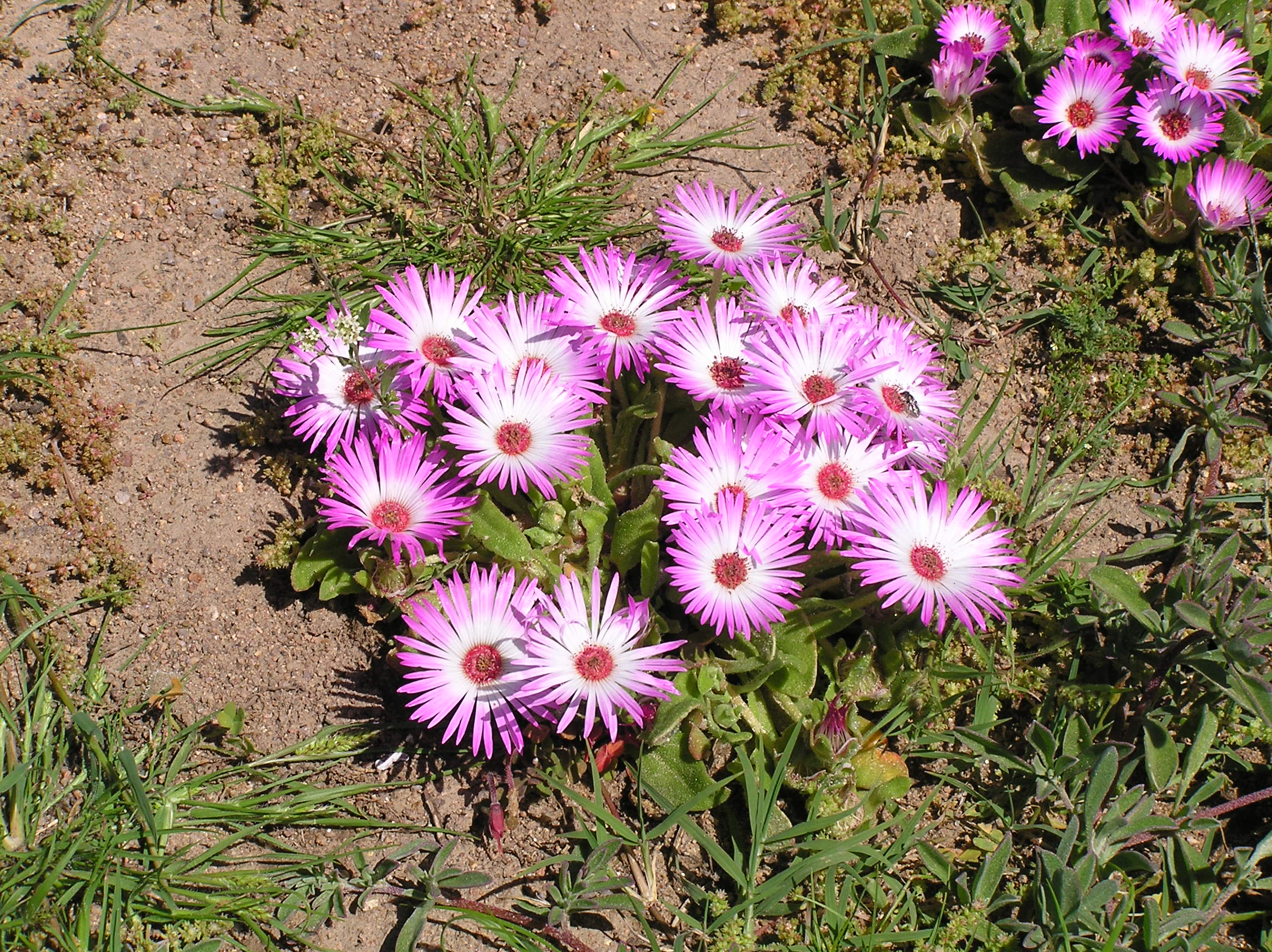
- Cleretum bellidiforme

Scientific classification
- Kingdom: Plantae
- Clade: Tracheophytes
- Clade: Angiosperms
- Clade: Eudicots
- Order: Caryophyllales
- Family: Aizoaceae
- Subfamily: Ruschioideae
- Tribe: Dorotheantheae

Type genus
- Dorotheanthus Schwantes

Genera
- Cleretum N.E.Br.

= Dorotheantheae =

Tribe of succulents

Dorotheantheae is a small tribe of annual succulents in the Aizoaceae subfamily Ruschioideae. Though it originally comprised three genera (Aethephyllum, Cleretum, and Dorotheanthus), Cleretum remains as the only recognised genus. Dorotheantheae are endemic to the western and south-western parts of South Africa. The type genus is Dorotheanthus, despite it being no longer recognised.

== Distribution and description ==
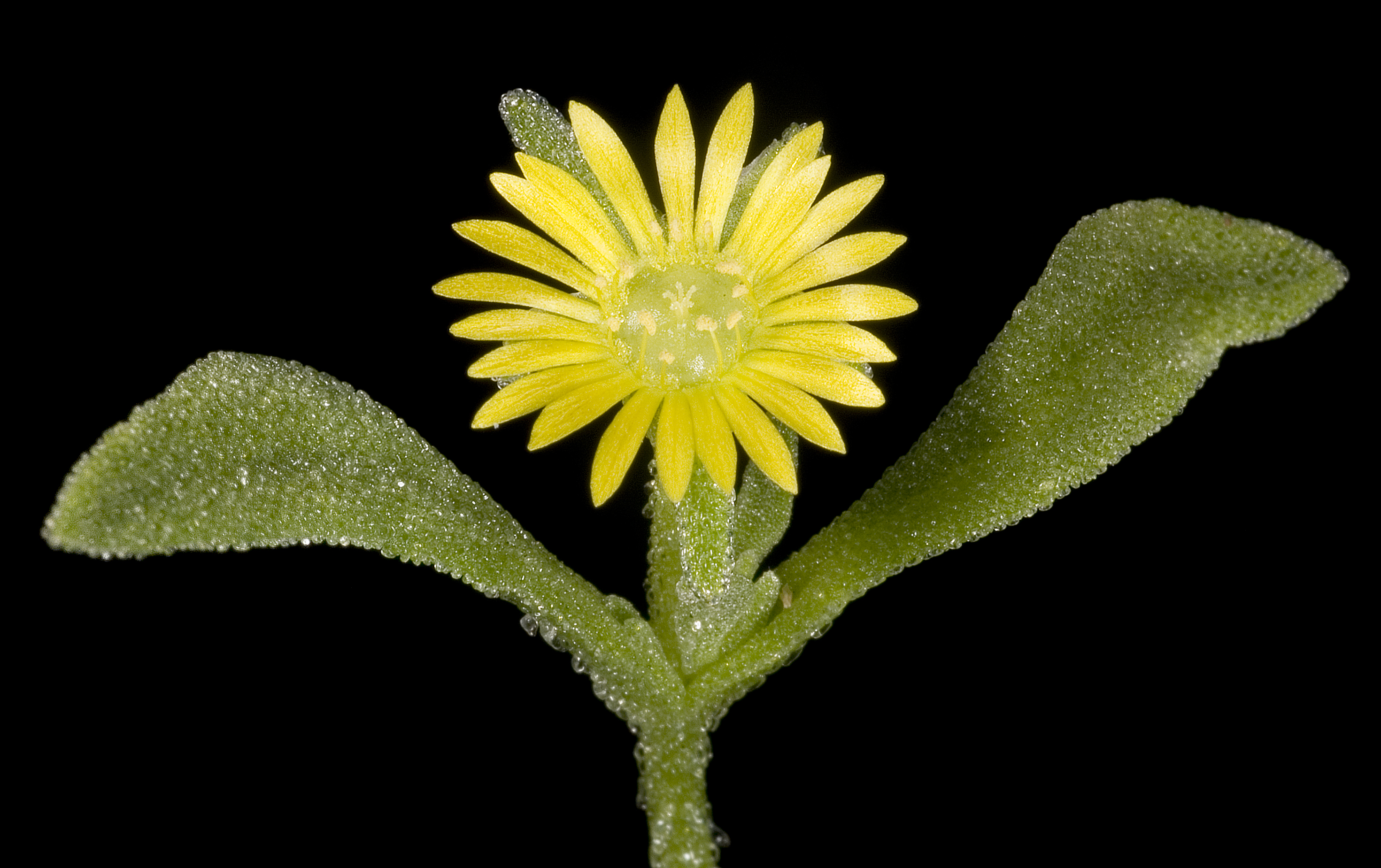
Cleretum papulosum, displaying the water storage cells in the leaves.

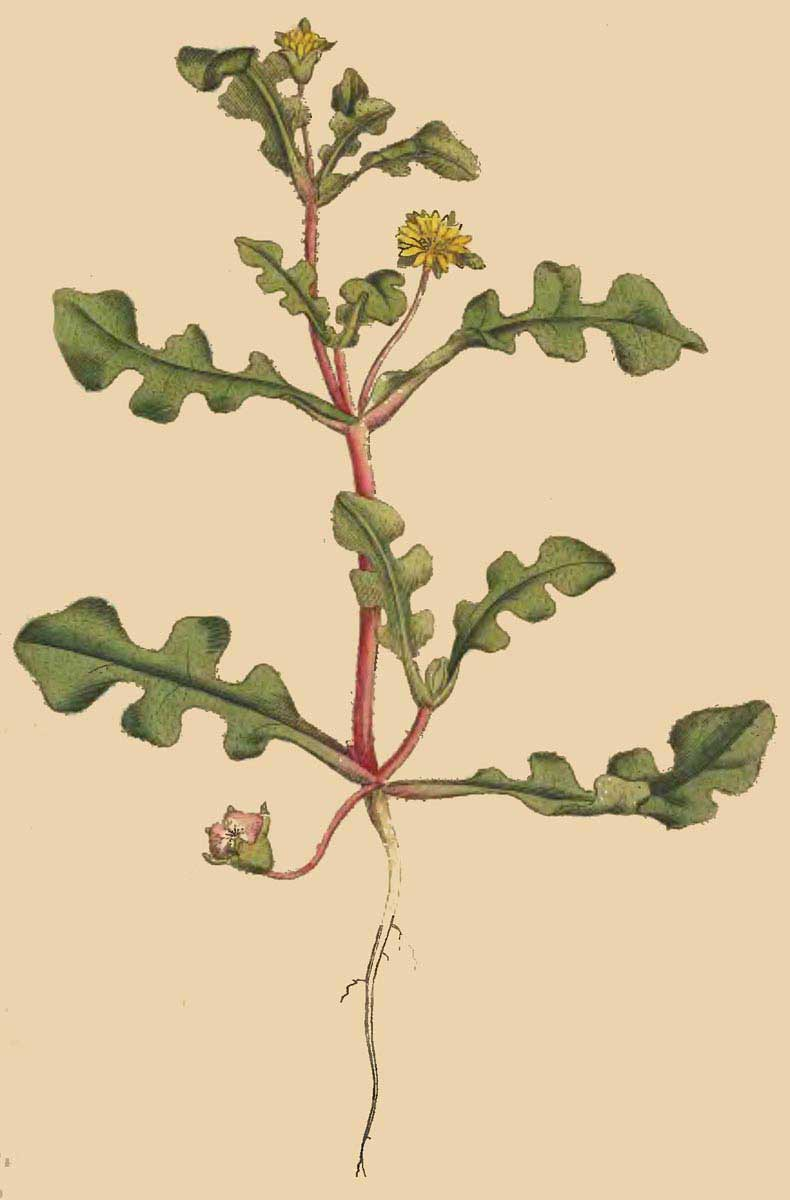
Artwork of Cleretum pinnatifidum, from The Botanical Magazine, showing the lyrate leaf shape.

Species in the Dorotheantheae tribe are endemic to the south and southwest areas of South Africa, specifically the Cape Floristic Region and Succulent Karoo Region, or "Greater Cape Flora", an area that sees great diversity in its flora, though, remains distinct. In turn, this means the location of individual species can range from as north as Namaqualand to as east as Plettenberg Bay. The species most commonly appear in flat and open areas, occasionally with the land consisting of loam or sand.

All species are annual succulent herbs. The difference in appearance between each of the tribe's four formerly recognised clades is usually minor. The leaf shape is spathulate, with the exception of those that were members of the Aethephyllum clade, with those having lyrate leaves. All species have visible bladder cells, typically described as "moderately raised". The pedicel is either long or short and there is distinct variation between clades for the vibrancy and colouration of the flower and its conspicuousness. Additionally, the diameter of the flower ranges from large to small.

All species have papillate seed surfaces, besides those that were in the Dorotheanthus subg. Dorotheanthus clade.

== Genera ==
There is only one recognised genus in the Dorotheantheae tribe, per Plants of the World Online:

- Cleretum N.E.Br.

Previously, another two genera were recognised as being members of this tribe:

- Aethephyllum N.E.Br.
- Dorotheanthus Schwantes (the type genus)

In a molecular study completed by Cornelia Klak and Peter V. Bruyns in 2012 and published in the scientific journal Taxon, titled "Phylogeny of the Dorotheantheae (Aizoaceae), a tribe of succulent annuals", it was found that Dorotheantheae consisted of four clades: the aforementioned three modified to have Dorotheanthus split in two, introducing D. subg. Dorotheanthus and D. subg. Pherolobus. Additionally, it was proved that the genus Cleretum was not monophyletic, as circumscribed in 1987, and hence some species were better suited under the genus Aethephyllum. Following this, it was argued that "fruit morphology" was unreliable for discerning genera in the family Aizoaceae; the most common manner was to consider combinations of homoplasious characteristics. This method was considered by Klak and Bruyns to be "not necessarily justified", with it being the only differentiating factor between the Cleretum and Dorotheanthus clades. Hence, despite there being aspects allowing for the recognition of Dorotheanthus and Aethephyllum, though they "remain[ed] difficult to distinguish", the conclusions of the study were that while the tribe is adequately characterised, the factors differentiating each genus are indistinct or negligible and should be reduced to only Cleretum due to that species' loose circumscription.

Prior to the study, the genera Cleretum and Dorotheanthus were often confused, as noted in the "Aizoaceae A-E" edition of Heidrun Hartmann's 2001 book "Illustrated Handbook of Succulent Plants".
