= Cleretum lyratifolium =

Scientific classification
- Kingdom: Plantae
- Clade: Tracheophytes
- Clade: Angiosperms
- Clade: Eudicots
- Order: Caryophyllales
- Family: Aizoaceae
- Genus: Cleretum
- Species: C. lyratifolium

Binomial name
- Cleretum lyratifolium Ihlenf. & Struck

Synonyms
- Aethephyllum lyratifolium (Ihlenf. & Struck) H.E.K.Hartmann

Species of flowering plant

Cleretum lyratifolium, commonly known as the desert weed sandfig, is a small annual plant in the family Aizoaceae and the species is endemic to the Northern Cape. It occurs in the Roggeveld Mountains. It may also occur in the Kamiesberge and the Swartruggens north of Ceres.
