= Cleretum bruynsii =

Scientific classification
- Kingdom: Plantae
- Clade: Tracheophytes
- Clade: Angiosperms
- Clade: Eudicots
- Order: Caryophyllales
- Family: Aizoaceae
- Genus: Cleretum
- Species: C. bruynsii

Binomial name
- Cleretum bruynsii Klak

Species of flowering plant

Cleretum bruynsii, commonly known as the Bushmanland sandfig, is a small annual plant in the family Aizoaceae and is part of the Succulent Karoo. The species is endemic to the Northern Cape and also occurs in the western Bushmanland near Springbok. The plant has a range of only 585 km².
