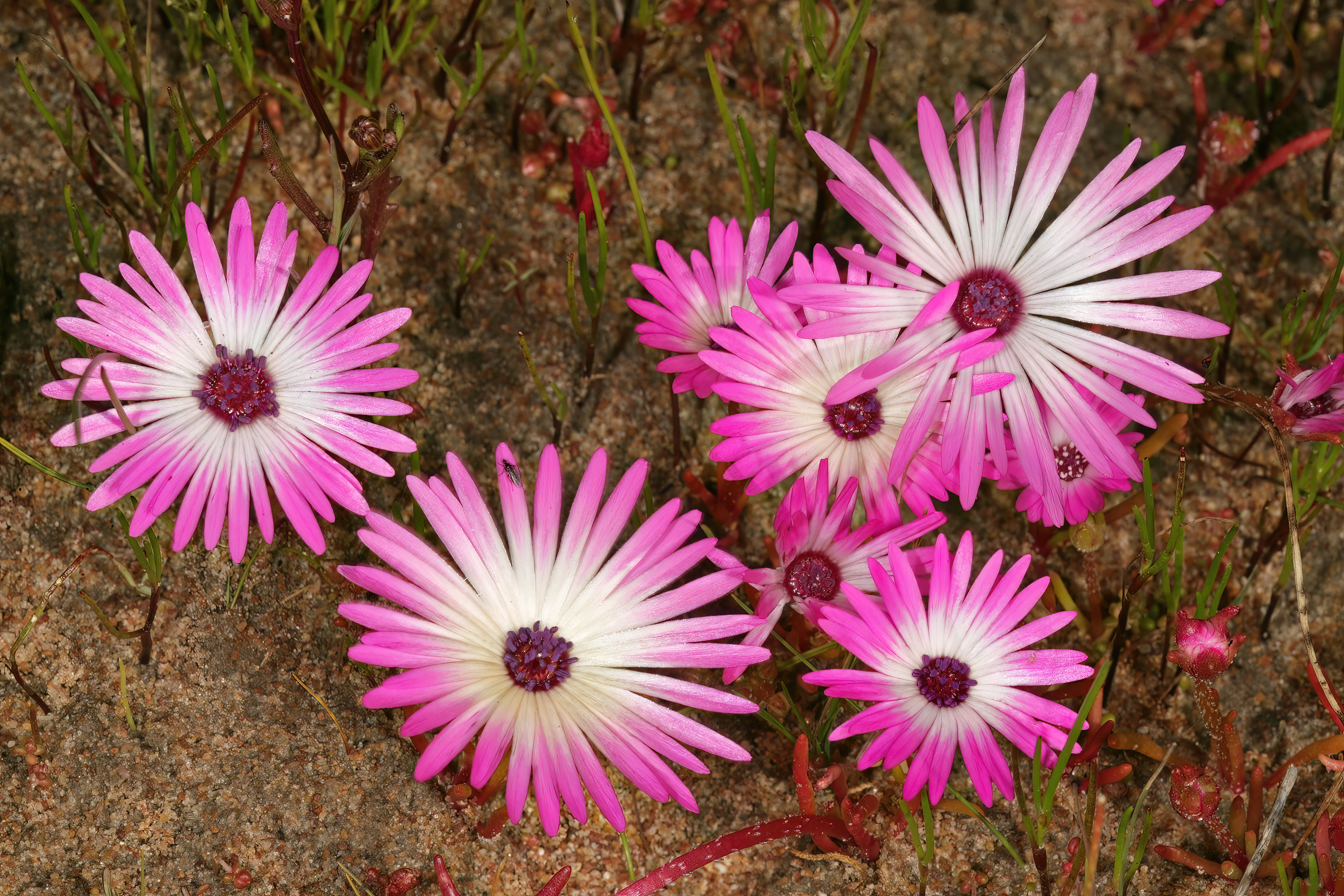

Scientific classification
- Kingdom: Plantae
- Clade: Tracheophytes
- Clade: Angiosperms
- Clade: Eudicots
- Order: Caryophyllales
- Family: Aizoaceae
- Genus: Cleretum
- Species: C. clavatum

Binomial name
- Cleretum clavatum (Haw.) Klak

Synonyms
- Cleretum tricolo (Willd.) G.D.Rowley; Dorotheanthus clavatus (Haw.) Struck; Dorotheanthus tricolor (Willd.) L.Bolus; Mesembryanthemum clavatum Haw.; Mesembryanthemum claviforme DC.; Mesembryanthemum lineare Thunb.; Mesembryanthemum pyropeum Haw.; Mesembryanthemum tricolor Willd.

= Cleretum clavatum =

Species of flowering plant

Cleretum clavatum, commonly known as the salt sandfig, is a small annual plant in the family Aizoaceae and is part of the strandveld and fynbos vegetation. The species is endemic to the Western Cape and occurs from Hopefield to the Cape Flats. The plant has a range of 1 855 km² and only ten subpopulations remain. Crop cultivation and development have destroyed large parts of the plant's habitat. Invasive plants and further development are still threats.
