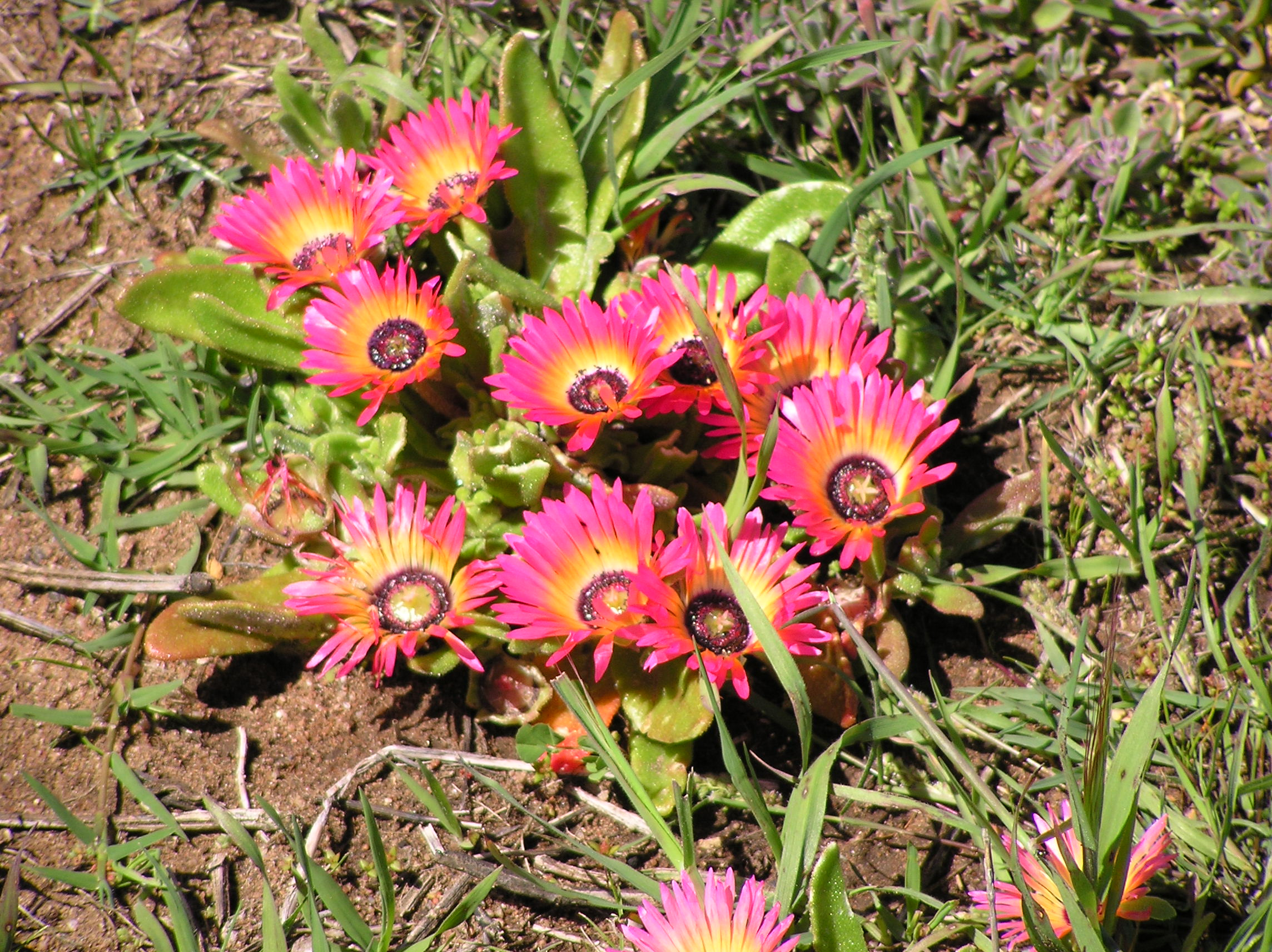

Scientific classification
- Kingdom: Plantae
- Clade: Tracheophytes
- Clade: Angiosperms
- Clade: Eudicots
- Order: Caryophyllales
- Family: Aizoaceae
- Genus: Cleretum
- Species: C. apetalum

Binomial name
- Cleretum apetalum (L.f.) N.E.Br.

Synonyms
- Cleretum gramineum (Haw.) N.E.Br.; Dorotheanthus apetalus (L.f.) N.E.Br.; Dorotheanthus copticus (Jacq.) L.Bolus; Dorotheanthus gramineus (Haw.) Schwantes; Mesembryanthemum apetalum L.f.; Mesembryanthemum copticum Jacq.; Mesembryanthemum gramineum Haw.; Mesembryanthemum humifusum Aiton; Mesembryanthemum micropetalum Pers.; Mesembryanthemum oligandrum Kunze

= Cleretum apetalum =

Species of flowering plant

Cleretum apetalum, commonly known as the mini sandfig, is a small annual plant in the family Fabaceae and is part of the fynbos. The species is endemic to the Western Cape and occurs from Yzerfontein to Cape Agulhas. The plant has a range of 9 250 km² and thirteen subpopulations are known. At places such as Yzerfontein, Gansbaai, Struisbaai, Muizenberg and Clovelly, the species' numbers are decreasing. At present, the population is not considered threatened.
