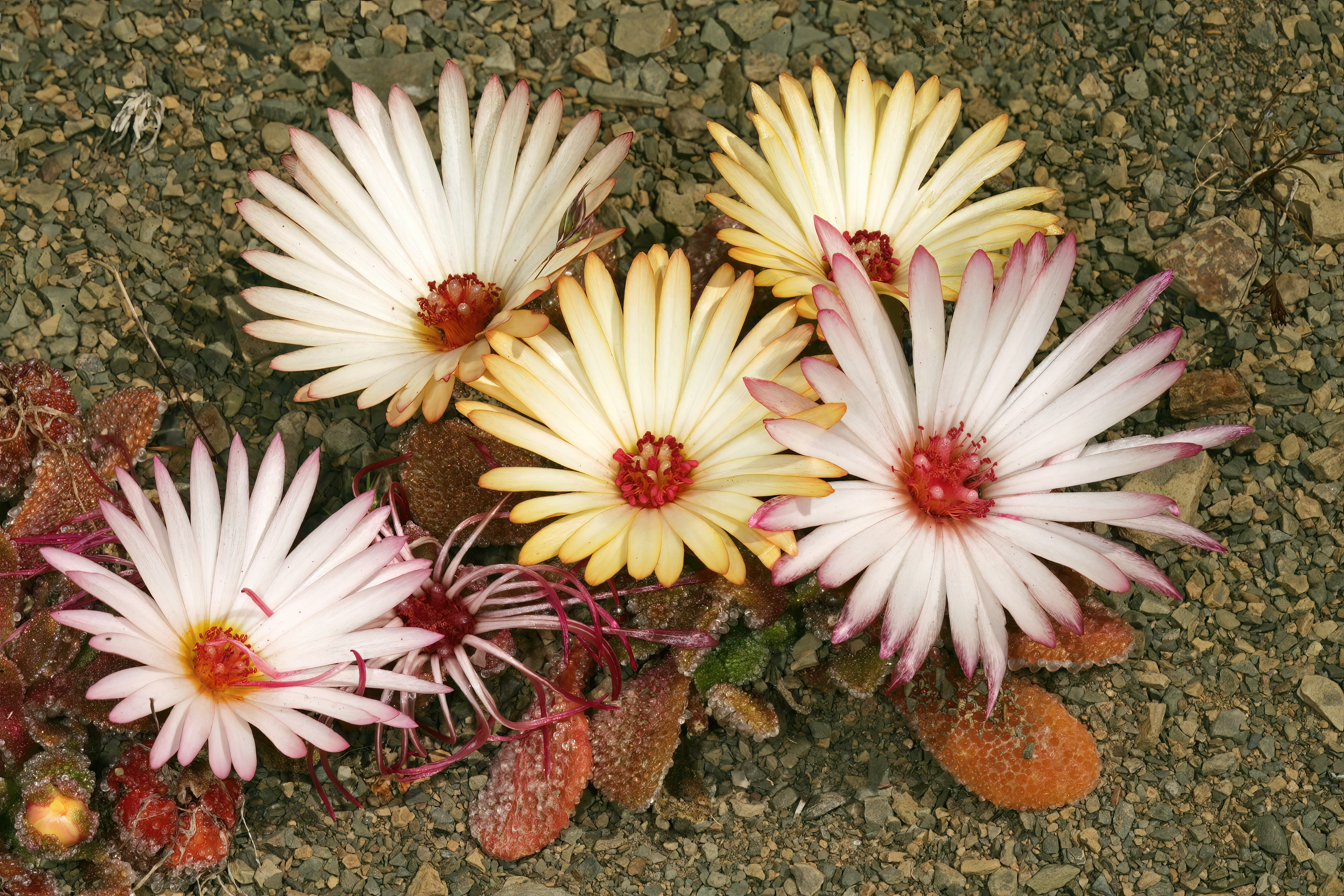

Scientific classification
- Kingdom: Plantae
- Clade: Tracheophytes
- Clade: Angiosperms
- Clade: Eudicots
- Order: Caryophyllales
- Family: Aizoaceae
- Genus: Cleretum
- Species: C. maughanii

Binomial name
- Cleretum maughanii (N.E.Br.) Klak

Synonyms
- Dorotheanthus maughanii (N.E.Br.) Ihlenf. & Struck; Pherolobus maughanii N.E.Br.

= Cleretum maughanii =

Species of flowering plant

Cleretum maughanii is a small annual plant in the family Aizoaceae and the species is endemic to the Northern Cape and occurs at Calvinia in a range of less than 200 km². The plant is not considered threatened.
