= Cleretum booysenii =

Scientific classification
- Kingdom: Plantae
- Clade: Embryophytes
- Clade: Tracheophytes
- Clade: Angiosperms
- Clade: Eudicots
- Order: Caryophyllales
- Family: Aizoaceae
- Genus: Cleretum
- Species: C. booysenii

Binomial name
- Cleretum booysenii (L.Bolus) Klak

Synonyms
- Dorotheanthus booysenii L.Bolus; Pherolobus booysenii (L.Bolus) H.E.K.Hartmann

Species of flowering plant

Cleretum booysenii is a small annual plant in the family Aizoaceae and is part of the fynbos. The species is endemic to the Northern Cape and occurs at Sutherland on the Roggeveld escarpment. The plant has a distribution area of less than 500 km² and is considered rare.
