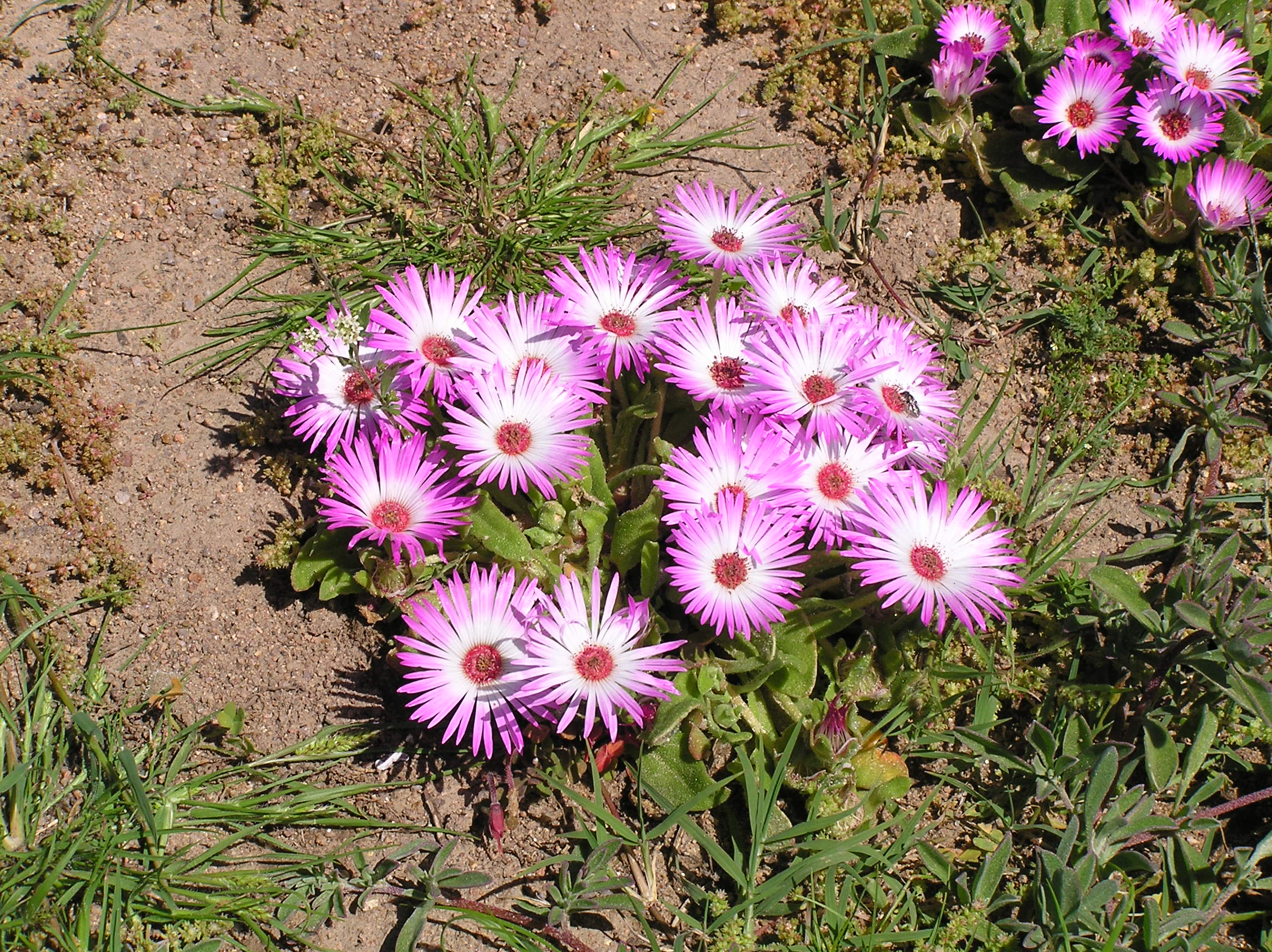
- At West Coast National Park, Western Cape, South Africa

Scientific classification
- Kingdom: Plantae
- Clade: Embryophytes
- Clade: Tracheophytes
- Clade: Angiosperms
- Clade: Eudicots
- Order: Caryophyllales
- Family: Aizoaceae
- Genus: Cleretum
- Species: C. bellidiforme

Binomial name
- Cleretum bellidiforme (Burm.f.) G.D.Rowley

Synonyms
- Cleretum criniflorum (L.f.) N.E.Br.; Cleretum cuneifolium N.E.Br.; Cleretum flos-solis (A.Berger) G.D.Rowley; Cleretum limpidum (Aiton) N.E.Br.; Cleretum muirii (N.E.Br.) G.D.Rowley; Cleretum oculatum (N.E.Br.) G.D.Rowley; Dorotheanthus acuminatus L.Bolus; Dorotheanthus bellidiformis (Burm.f.) N.E.Br.; Dorotheanthus bidouwensis L.Bolus; Dorotheanthus criniflorus (L.f.) Schwantes; Dorotheanthus flos-solis (A.Berger) L.Bolus; Dorotheanthus hallii L.Bolus; Dorotheanthus littlewoodii L.Bolus; Dorotheanthus luteus N.E.Br.; Dorotheanthus martini L.Bolus; Dorotheanthus muirii N.E.Br.; Dorotheanthus oculatus N.E.Br.; Dorotheanthus stayneri L.Bolus; Dorotheanthus ulularis Brusse; Mesembryanthemum bellidiforme Burm.f.; Mesembryanthemum criniflorum L.f.; Mesembryanthemum cuneifolium Jacq.; Mesembryanthemum flos-solis A.Berger; Mesembryanthemum limpidum Aiton; Micropterum cuneifolium (Jacq.) Schwantes; Micropterum limpidum (Aiton) Schwantes; Stigmatocarpum criniflorum (L.f.) L.Bolus

= Cleretum bellidiforme =

Species of flowering plant

Cleretum bellidiforme, commonly called Livingstone daisy, Bokbaaivygie (Afrikaans), or Buck Bay vygie, is a species of flowering plant in the family Aizoaceae, native to the Cape Peninsula in South Africa. It is a low-growing succulent annual growing to 25 cm (10 in), and cultivated for its iridescent, many-petalled, daisy-like blooms in shades of white, yellow, orange, cream, pink and crimson. In temperate areas it is popularly grown as a half-hardy annual, and lends itself to mass plantings or as edging plants in summer bedding schemes in parks and gardens. It is still widely referenced under its former names, Mesembryanthemum criniflorum, Mesembryanthemum bellidiformis and Dorotheanthus bellidiformis.

== Description ==
Cleretum bellidiforme is a winter growing annual with green or slightly maroon leaves. Leaves are flat and rounded at the tip, with notably bladder shaped cells on the leaf surface that give the leaves a reflective quality. These cells are used to store water, which classifies the plant as a succulent. The plant usually forms a stout groundcover, but its flowers may reach up to 25 cm (10 in). Flowers are solitary and brightly colored with many narrow petals. The flowers open in bright sunlight, and are up to 30 millimetres (1.2 in) in diameter. Stamens are maroon with purple or yellow anthers, and are found in the center of the flower in rows. The ovary is inferior to the stamens. Fruits are a five compartmented capsule that expands in wet weather, revealing the very small, smooth, light brown seeds.

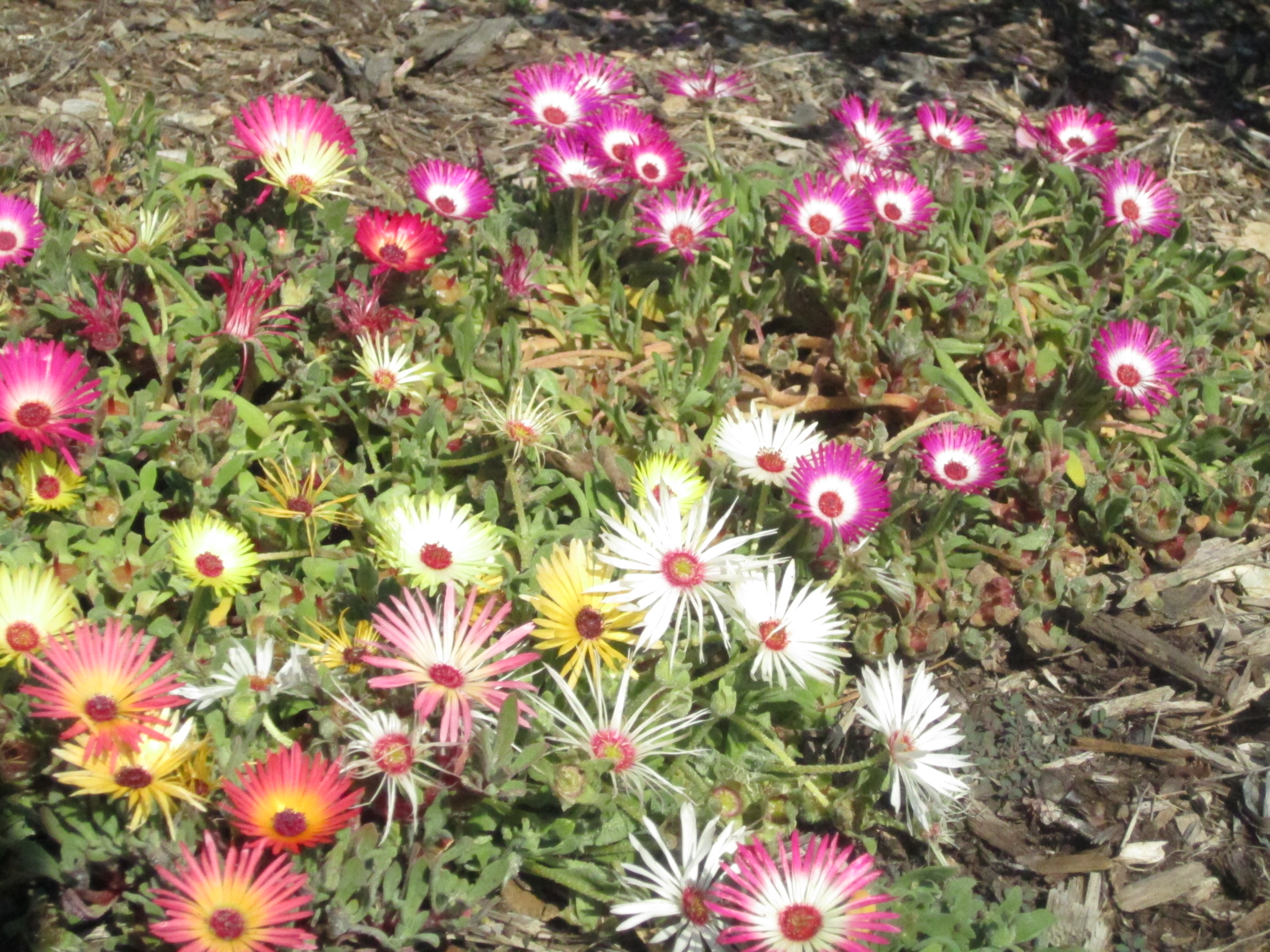
The many colors of Livingstone daisy

== Taxonomy ==
The species was first described by Nicolaas Laurens Burman in 1768, as Mesembryanthemum bellidiforme. It was later transferred from Mesembryanthemum to Dorotheanthus and then to Cleretum. It has been synonymized with five species initially described in Mesembryanthemum (e.g. Mesembryanthemum criniflorum) and nine originally described in Dorotheanthus (e.g. Dorotheanthus ulularis).

Dorotheanthus was named by Gustuv Schwanthes after his mother, combining her name with anthus, Greek for flower.

=== Infraspecific variability ===
Cleretum bellidiforme exists in a vast number of colour forms, with each restricted to a particular locality, and lacking any distinct differences from each other beyond flower colour. There was, however, formerly one subspecies which remained recognised amongst many synonyms, Dorotheanthus bellidiformis subsp. hestermalensis Ihlenf. & Struck, 1986, which was easily distinguished by its extremely small size, with tiny pink flowers and only a few tiny leaves, and which had a more northerly distribution in (northernmost) Western Cape and Northern Cape; as of 2012 it has been raised to species level as C. hestermalense (Ihlenf. & Struck) Klak.

== Distribution ==
C. belliforme is restricted to the winter rainfall regions of western South Africa, where it chiefly grows in the western half Western Cape. In the Northern Cape it is restricted to the desert lands bordering Western Cape northwest of the Cederberg, and inland from the southern stretch of the Atlantic coast. The distribution is patchy, not continuous.

It is very common in Bokbaai where it is found flowering in great numbers in spring.

== Ecology ==
It is adapted to disturbed sand, such as found on riverbanks or desert dunes; the small flat seeds easily slip deeper in loose sand out of the summer sun. It is also found on clay slopes, limestone ridges and granite outcrops. It is very short-lived, the seeds germinating with the first autumn rains, and growing and flowering from late winter to spring (July to October). Flowers have the ability to self-pollinate. It grows in fynbos and succulent karoo. It sometimes grows together with low-growing Oxalis and Senecio. It is sometimes found as a solitary plant, in other areas in large colonies.

== Cultivation ==
This is a well-known and popular garden annual in many areas around the world, available with flowers in numerous colours. It is found listed under a number of synonyms in seed catalogues. Seeds can be sown in a cold frame. Able to grow best in areas that are frost-free with little moisture. Former subspecies C. hestermalense is difficult to germinate, these germinate best when kept hot and dry over the summer. Flowers are capable of being grown in household locations such as "window boxes, troughs, and pots" in areas with long hours of sun. If grown in soil with bad drainage roots have the potential to be overcome by fungus.

== Uses ==
Mainly utilized throughout the world for ornamental purposes.

== Phytoremediation ==
The journal published by Health and Environmental Research Online (HERO) discussed research where over twenty "ornamental" plant species currently growing in Pakistan were observed for Pb phytoextraction potential. After being exposed to varying levels of Pb in soil for a time frame of seven weeks, Mesembryanthemum criniflorum was found to be very successful at Pb phytoextraction in all levels of Pb contaminated soil.

== Names ==
C. bellidiforme was named the Livingstone daisy by seed-seller Samuel Ryder in 1928, after explorer David Livingstone.

In South Africa it is usually known as Livingstone daisy when sold in the horticultural trade. Common vernacular names for the wild plants are bokbaaivygie in Afrikaans, or Bok Bay vygie or Buckbay-vygie. Less common are sandvygie, skilpadkos (turtle food) or ysplant (ice plant).

== Conservation ==
According to the Red List of South African plants its status is Least Concern (LC) as of 2017.
