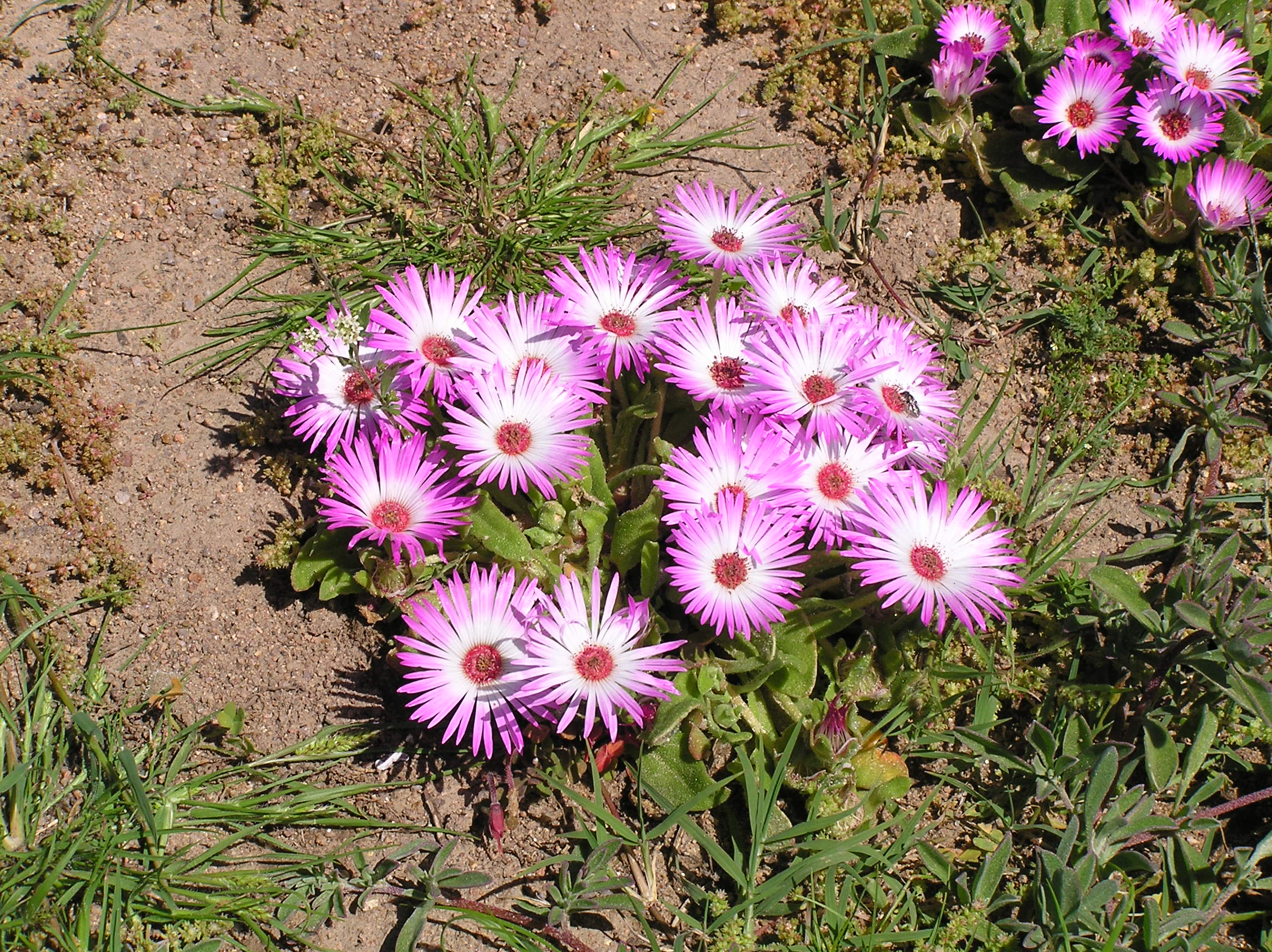
- Cleretum bellidiforme at West Coast National Park, South Africa

Scientific classification
- Kingdom: Plantae
- Clade: Tracheophytes
- Clade: Angiosperms
- Clade: Eudicots
- Order: Caryophyllales
- Family: Aizoaceae
- Subfamily: Ruschioideae
- Tribe: Dorotheantheae
- Genus: Cleretum; N.E.Br.

Synonyms
- Aethephyllum N.E.Br.; Dorotheanthus Schwantes; Micropterum Schwantes; Pherolobus N.E.Br.; Sineoperculum van Jaarsv.; Stigmatocarpum L.Bolus

= Cleretum =

Genus of succulents

Cleretum is a genus of flowering plants in the family Aizoaceae, native to the Cape Provinces of South Africa.

== Taxonomy ==
The genus Cleretum was erected by Nicholas Edward Brown in 1925. He published the name in a key, basing the diagnosis on a herbarium sheet that was discovered to contain parts belonging to plants in different genera and without designating a type. This caused confusion as to whether the genus had been validly published and whether genus names published later were synonyms or not. It was established in 1985 that Cleretum was validly published, and that Micropterum was a later synonym. Cleretum papulosum was designated as the type species. Cleretum is placed in the tribe Dorotheantheae. A study in 2012 concluded that the genera previously separated in the Dorotheantheae did not differ sufficiently to be recognized, and placed them all in Cleretum, now the only genus in the tribe.

=== Species ===
As of March 2019, Plants of the World Online accepted the following 13 species:

- Cleretum apetalum (L.f.) N.E.Br.
- Cleretum bellidiforme (Burm.f.) G.D.Rowley
- Cleretum booysenii (L.Bolus) Klak
- Cleretum bruynsii Klak
- Cleretum clavatum (Haw.) Klak
- Cleretum herrei (Schwantes) Ihlenf. & Struck
- Cleretum hestermalense (Ihlenf. & Struck) Klak
- Cleretum lyratifolium Ihlenf. & Struck
- Cleretum maughanii (N.E.Br.) Klak
- Cleretum papulosum (L.f.) N.E.Br.
- Cleretum patersonjonesii Klak
- Cleretum pinnatifidum (L.f.) N.E.Br.
- Cleretum rourkei (L.Bolus) Klak
