= Cleretum rourkei =

Scientific classification
- Kingdom: Plantae
- Clade: Tracheophytes
- Clade: Angiosperms
- Clade: Eudicots
- Order: Caryophyllales
- Family: Aizoaceae
- Genus: Cleretum
- Species: C. rourkei

Binomial name
- Cleretum rourkei (L.Bolus) Klak

Species of flowering plant

Cleretum rourkei is a small annual plant in the family Aizoaceae and the species is endemic to the Northern Cape.
