= Cleretum patersonjonesii =

Scientific classification
- Kingdom: Plantae
- Clade: Embryophytes
- Clade: Tracheophytes
- Clade: Angiosperms
- Clade: Eudicots
- Order: Caryophyllales
- Family: Aizoaceae
- Genus: Cleretum
- Species: C. patersonjonesii

Binomial name
- Cleretum patersonjonesii Klak

Species of flowering plant

Cleretum patersonjonesii is a small annual plant in the family Aizoaceae and the species is endemic to the Northern Cape and occurs on the Kamiesberge where it is part of the fynbos.
