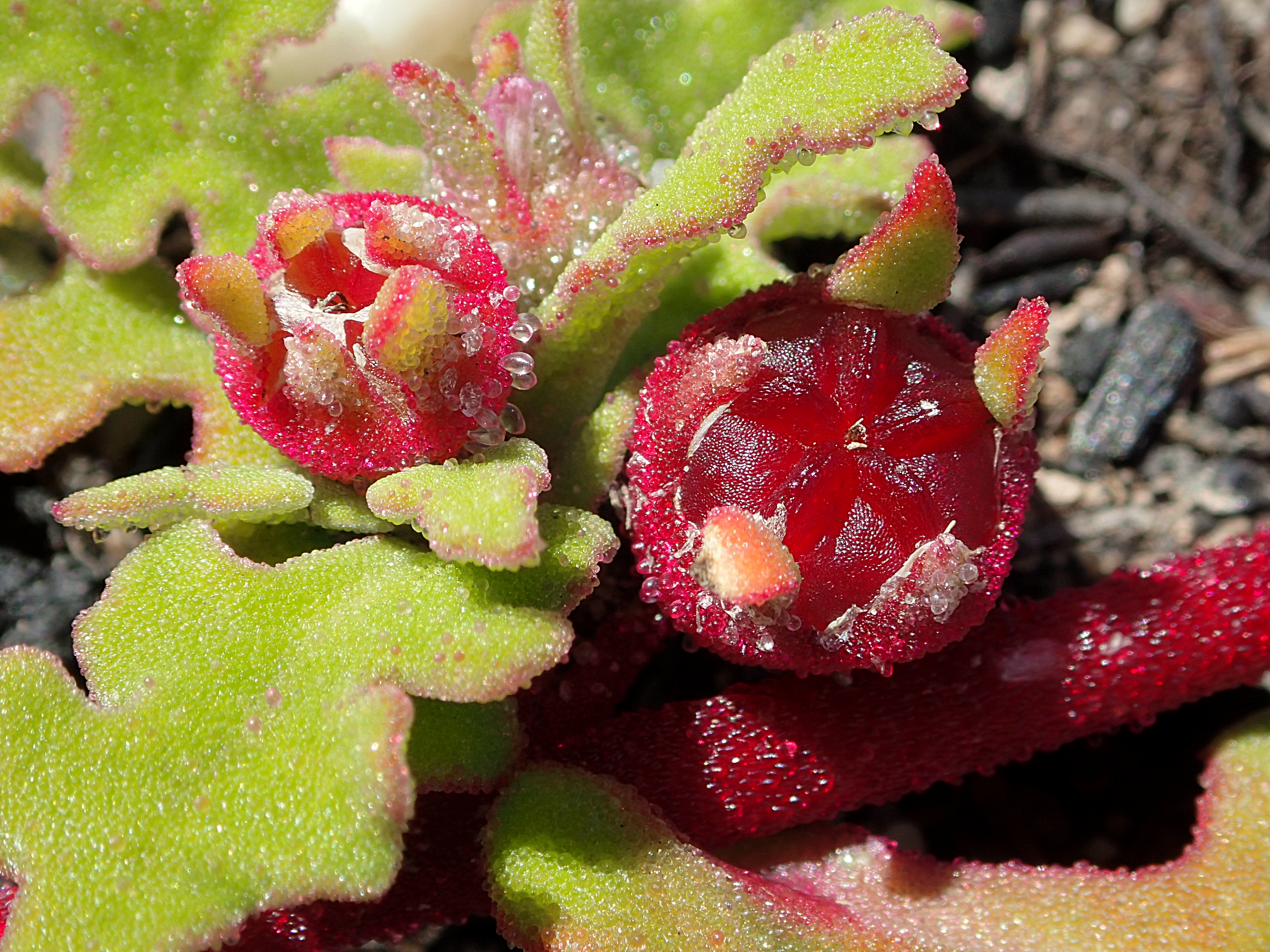

Scientific classification
- Kingdom: Plantae
- Clade: Tracheophytes
- Clade: Angiosperms
- Clade: Eudicots
- Order: Caryophyllales
- Family: Aizoaceae
- Genus: Cleretum
- Species: C. herrei

Binomial name
- Cleretum herrei (Schwantes) Ihlenf. & Struck

Synonyms
- Aethephyllum herrei (Schwantes) H.E.K.Hartmann; Micropterum herrei Schwantes

= Cleretum herrei =

Species of flowering plant

Cleretum herrei, commonly known as the weedy sandfig, is a small annual plant in the family Aizoaceae and the species is endemic to the Western Cape.
