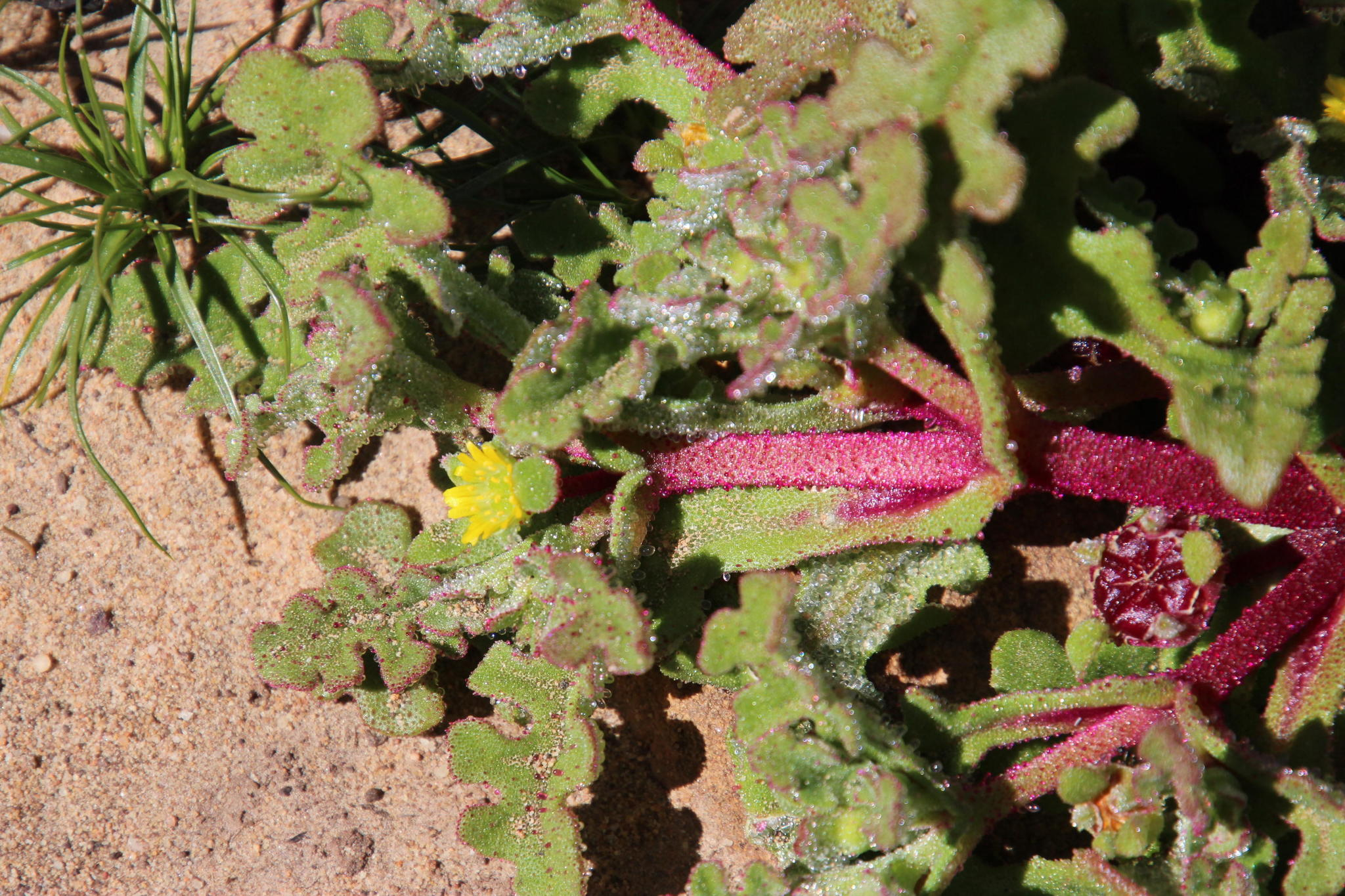

Scientific classification
- Kingdom: Plantae
- Clade: Tracheophytes
- Clade: Angiosperms
- Clade: Eudicots
- Order: Caryophyllales
- Family: Aizoaceae
- Genus: Cleretum
- Species: C. pinnatifidum

Binomial name
- Cleretum pinnatifidum (L.f.) N.E.Br., L. Bolus

Synonyms
- Aethephyllum pinnatifidum (L.f.) N.E.Br.; Mesembryanthemum pinnatifidumL.f.; Mesembryanthemum pinnatumThunb.

= Cleretum pinnatifidum =

Species of flowering plant

Cleretum pinnatifidum is a small annual plant in the family Aizoaceae and the species is endemic to the Western Cape.
