= Cleretum hestermalense =

Scientific classification
- Kingdom: Plantae
- Clade: Embryophytes
- Clade: Tracheophytes
- Clade: Angiosperms
- Clade: Eudicots
- Order: Caryophyllales
- Family: Aizoaceae
- Genus: Cleretum
- Species: C. hestermalense

Binomial name
- Cleretum hestermalense (Ihlenf. & Struck) Klak

Synonyms
- Dorotheanthus bellidiformis subsp. hestermalensis Ihlenf. & Struck; Dorotheanthus hestermalensis (Ihlenf. & Struck) H.E.K.Hartmann

Species of flowering plant

Cleretum hestermalense is a small annual plant in the family Aizoaceae and the species is endemic to the Northern Cape.
