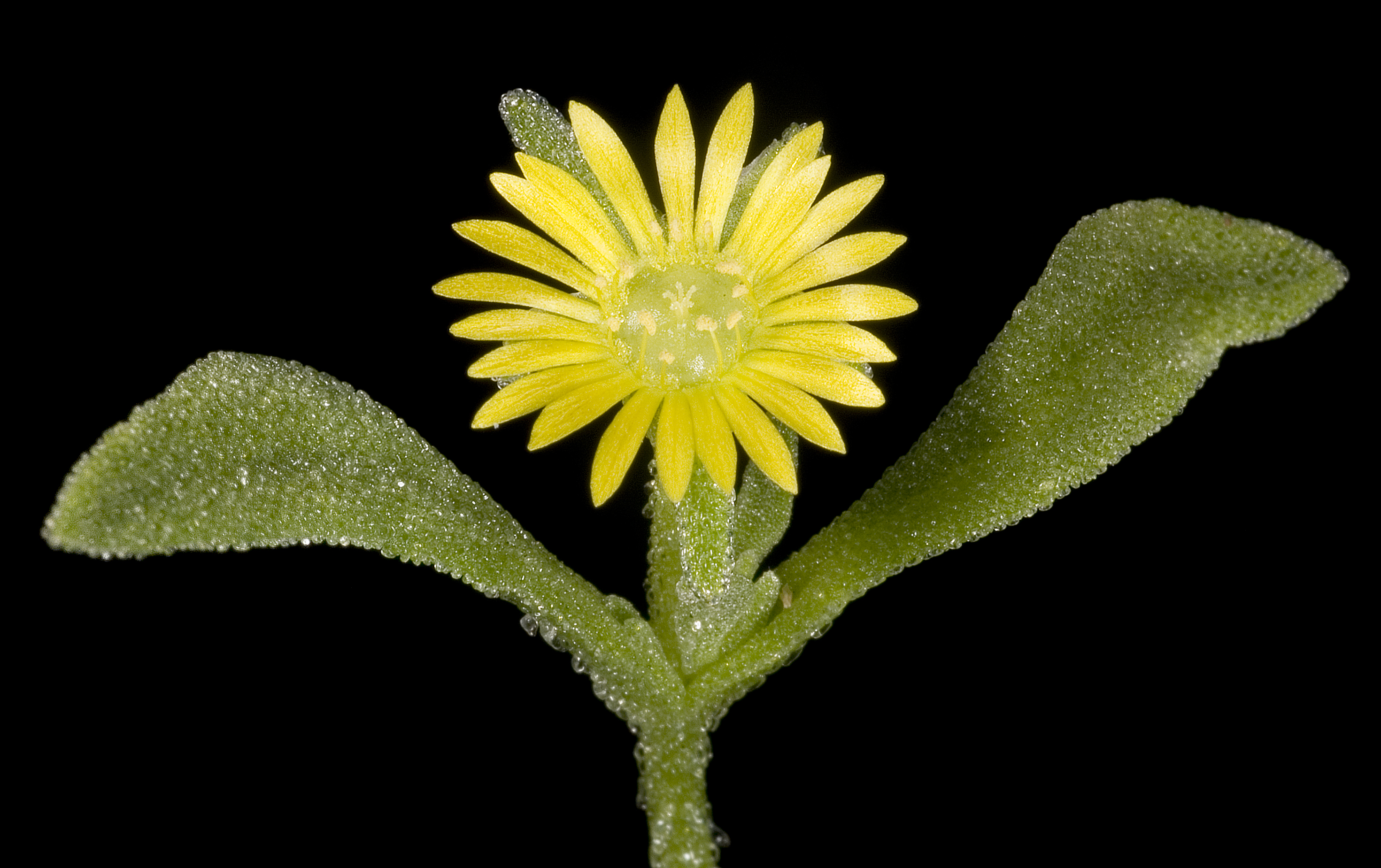

Scientific classification
- Kingdom: Plantae
- Clade: Tracheophytes
- Clade: Angiosperms
- Clade: Eudicots
- Order: Caryophyllales
- Family: Aizoaceae
- Genus: Cleretum
- Species: C. papulosum

Binomial name
- Cleretum papulosum (L.f.) N.E.Br.

Synonyms
- Mesembryanthemum papulosum L.f.; Micropterum papulosum (L.f.) Schwantes

= Cleretum papulosum =

Species of flowering plant

Cleretum papulosum, commonly known as the salad sandfig or sandslaai, is a small annual plant in the family Aizoaceae and the species is endemic to the Northern Cape and the Western Cape.
