= Overberg (disambiguation) =

Overberg or Overburg may refer to:

In South Africa

- The Overberg region in the Western Cape province of South Africa
- Overberg Agri, an agricultural company in Western Cape
- The Overberg District Municipality, a municipality in the Overberg region
- The Overberg Test Range, a rocket launch site and weapons systems testing facility in the Overberg
- AFB Overberg, a South African Air Force base
- Overberg branch line, a railway line

Other

- Overberg (Netherlands), a town in the Netherlands
- Bernhard Heinrich Overberg (1754–1826), Catholic ecclesiastical educator
