= Dennehof =

Dennehof may refer to:

- Dennehof, Gauteng, a suburb of Johannesburg, South Africa
- Dennehof, Western Cape, a settlement in Overberg District Municipality, Western Cape, South Africa
