= Theewaterskloof Local Municipality =

Theewaterskloof
- Local municipality
- Seal

- Location in the Western Cape
- Coordinates: 34°10′S 19°30′E
- Country: South Africa
- Province: Western Cape
- District: Overberg
- Seat: Caledon
- Wards: 13

Government
  - Type: Municipal council
  - Mayor: Kallie Papier (PA)

Area
  - Total: 3,232 km^{2} (1,248 sq mi)

Population (2022)
  - Total: 139,563
  - Density: 43.18/km^{2} (111.8/sq mi)

Racial makeup (2022)
  - Black African: 34.7%
  - Coloured: 55.2%
  - Indian/Asian: 0.3%
  - White: 8.5%

First languages (2011)
  - Afrikaans: 73.6%
  - Xhosa: 16.9%
  - English: 3.9%
  - Sotho: 3.6%
  - Other: 2%
- Time zone: UTC+2 (SAST)
- Municipal code: WC031

Theewaterskloof Municipality (Afrikaans: Theewaterskloof Munisipaliteit; Xhosa: uMasipala wase Theewaterskloof) is a local municipality located within the Overberg District Municipality, in the Western Cape province of South Africa. As of 2022, the population was 139,563. Its municipality code is WC031. The enormous Theewaterskloof Dam, which provides water for Cape Town and the surrounding areas, is located in the municipality.

== Geography ==
Topographic map of the Theewaterskloof Municipality

The municipality covers an area of 3,232 square kilometres (1,248 sq mi) in the western interior of the Overberg region. It occupies the area between the Riviersonderend Mountains to the north and the Kogelberg and Kleinrivier Mountains to the south; to the west it stretches as far as the Hottentots-Holland mountains.

The western area of the municipality is the Elgin Valley, drained by the Palmiet River. The northern part is the valley of the Sonderend River including the Theewaterskloof Dam. The southeastern part is in the Overberg plain, drained by the Bot and Klein Rivers.

According to the 2022 South African census the municipality has a population of 139,563 people. Of this population, 55.2% describe themselves as "Coloured", 34.7% as "Black African", and 8.5% as "White".

According to the 2011 census the municipality has a population of 108,790 people in 28,884 households. Of this population, 62.9% describe themselves as "Coloured", 26.4% as "Black African", and 9.4% as "White". The first language of 73.6% of the population is Afrikaans, while 16.9% speak Xhosa, 3.9% speak English and 3.6% speak Sotho.

The largest town in the municipality is Grabouw in the Elgin Valley, which as of 2011 has a population of 30,337. However, the municipal headquarters are situated in Caledon (pop. 13,020) on the plain. Between Grabouw and Caledon is Botrivier (pop. 5,505) at the base of the Houwhoek Pass. Villiersdorp (pop. 10,004) is located in the northern part of the municipality close to the Theewaterskloof Dam. Downstream from the dam along the Sonderend River are the villages of Genadendal (pop. 5,663), Greyton (pop. 2,780) and Riviersonderend (pop. 5,245). The smallest town in the district is Tesselaarsdal, which is approximately 20 km south-east of Caledon.

== History ==
At the end of the apartheid era, in the area that was to become Theewaterskloof, there were municipal councils for the towns of Grabouw, Caledon, Villiersdorp, Greyton, and Riviersonderend, and a local council for the village of Botrivier. These councils were elected by the white residents. The coloured residents of Pineview (Grabouw), Bergsig (Caledon), Myddleton, Heuwelkruin (Greyton), and Riviersonderend were governed by management committees subordinate to the white councils. The former mission station of Genadendal was governed by a management board, and the remaining rural areas fell under the Overberg Regional Services Council.

While the negotiations to end apartheid were taking place a process was established for local authorities to negotiate voluntary mergers. Such mergers took place in two towns in the Theewaterskloof region: in August 1993 the Municipality of Riviersonderend merged with the Riviersonderend Management Committee to form the Municipality for the Area of Riviersonderend, and in January 1994 the Municipality of Caledon merged with the Bergsig Management Committee to form the Municipality for the Area of Caledon.

After the national elections of 1994 the process of negotiation became mandatory, and included political parties and local community organisations as well as the existing local authorities. Transitional local councils (TLCs) were established in each town or village as a result of this process.

- In October 1994:
  - the Municipality of Grabouw and the Pineview Management Committee were replaced by the Grabouw TLC.
  - the Villiersdorp Municipality and the Villiersdorp Management Committee were replaced by the Villiersdorp TLC.
- In November 1994 the Botrivier Local Council was replaced by the Botrivier TLC.
- In December 1994 the Municipality for the Area of Riviersonderend was replaced by the Riviersonderend TLC.
- In January 1995:
  - the Municipality for the Area of Caledon was replaced by the Caledon TLC.
  - the Municipality of Greyton and the Heuwelkruin Management Committee were replaced by the Greyton TLC.
  - the Genadendal Management Board was replaced by the Genadendal TLC.
- In February 1995 the Myddleton Management Committee was replaced by the Myddleton TLC.

These transitional councils were initially made up of members nominated during the negotiations, some of whom had been councillors of the previous local authorities, while others represented political parties and community organisations. In May 1996 elections were held to replace the nominated councils with elected councils. At these elections the Overberg District Council was established, replacing the Overberg Regional Services Council. Transitional representative councils (TRCs) were also elected to represent rural areas outside the TLCs on the District Council; the area that was to become Theewaterskloof included parts of the Nuweberg, Caledon and Swellendam TRCs.

At the local elections of December 2000 the TLCs and TRCs were dissolved, and the Theewaterskloof Local Municipality was created as a single local authority incorporating both rural and urban areas.

== Politics ==
The municipal council consists of twenty-seven members elected by mixed-member proportional representation. Fourteen councillors are elected by first-past-the-post voting in fourteen wards, while the remaining thirteen are chosen from party lists so that the total number of party representatives is proportional to the number of votes received.

In the election of 4 November 2026 the Democratic Alliance (DA) won a plurality of eleven seats on the council.

The following table shows the results of the 2026 election.

Party	Ward			List			Total seats
Party	Votes	%	Seats	Votes	%	Seats	Total seats
Democratic Alliance	12,174	39.32	10	12,440	39.80	1	11
African National Congress	7,533	24.33	4	7,633	24.42	3	7
Patriotic Alliance	4,190	13.53	0	4,177	13.36	4	4
Freedom Front Plus	1,299	4.20	0	1,220	3.90	1	1
National Coloured Congress	1,199	3.87	0	1,178	3.77	1	1
Good	1,166	3.77	0	1,060	3.39	1	1
Economic Freedom Fighters	893	2.88	0	942	3.01	1	1
South African Communist Party	513	1.66	0	482	1.54	1	1
Independent candidates	12	0.04	0				0
12 other parties	1,986	6.41	0	2,123	6.79	0	0
Total	30,965	100.00	14	31,255	100.00	13	27
Valid votes	30,965	98.60		31,255	98.80		
Invalid/blank votes	440	1.40		379	1.20		
Total votes	31,405	100.00		31,634	100.00		
Registered voters/turnout	65,995	47.59		65,995	47.93		
