= Serruria nivenii =

Scientific classification
- Kingdom: Plantae
- Clade: Tracheophytes
- Clade: Angiosperms
- Clade: Eudicots
- Order: Proteales
- Family: Proteaceae
- Genus: Serruria
- Species: S. nivenii

Binomial name
- Serruria nivenii Salisb. ex Knight

Species of shrub from the Western Cape of South Africa

Serruria nivenii is a shrub that belongs to the genus Serruria.

Sightings of this poorly known, and rather uncommon species have only recently been found in the Groenlandberg near Elgin, the Swartberg at Caledon, and the uppermost parts of the Kleinrivier Mountains at Hermanus.

== Name ==
The plant is named after the Scottish botanist James Niven.

It was also previously known by the names Serruria plumosa and Serruria scariosa.
