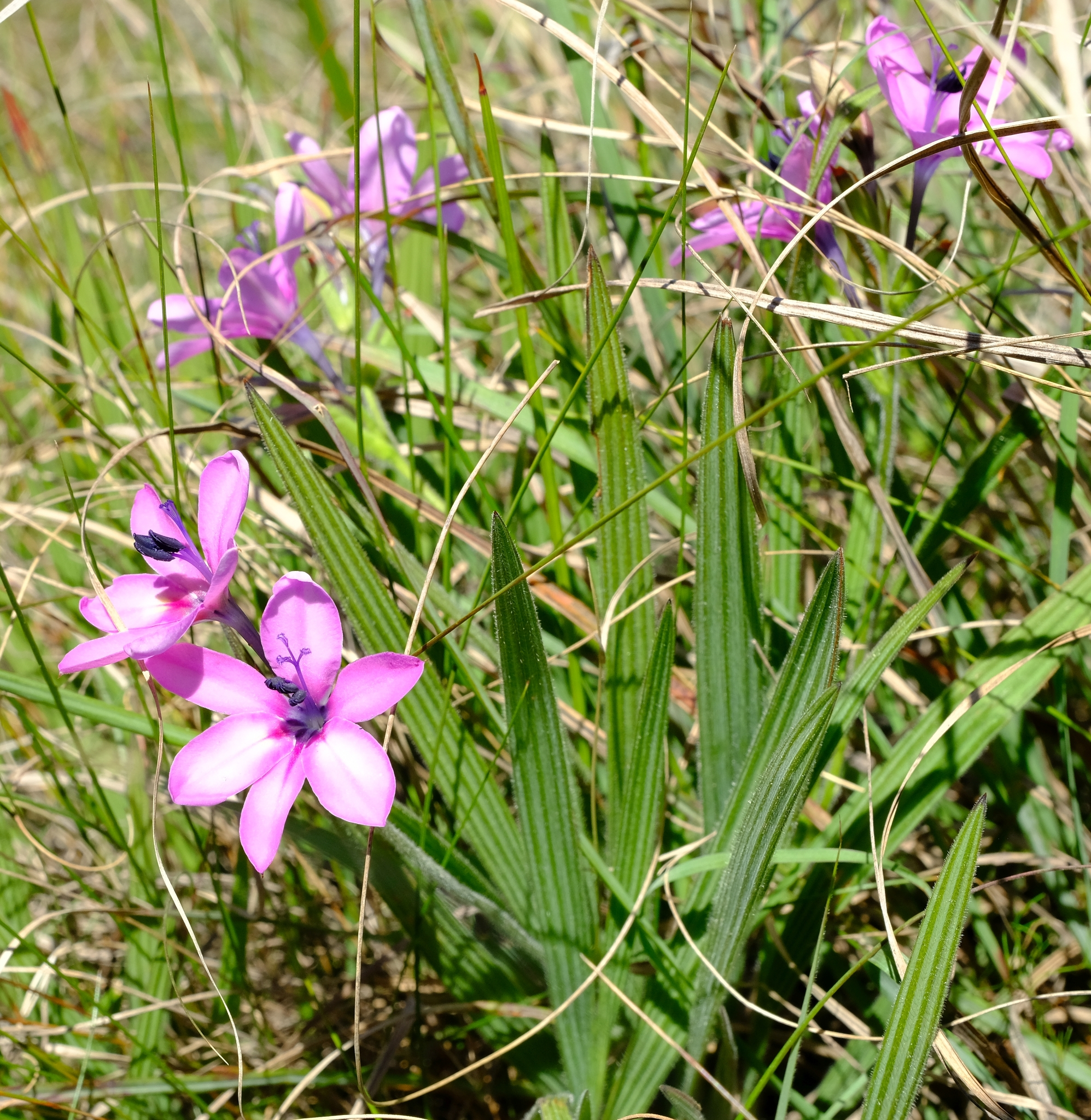

Scientific classification
- Kingdom: Plantae
- Clade: Tracheophytes
- Clade: Angiosperms
- Clade: Monocots
- Order: Asparagales
- Family: Iridaceae
- Genus: Babiana
- Species: B. purpurea

Binomial name
- Babiana purpurea (Vahl) Ker Gawl., (1807)

Synonyms
- Babiana stricta var. purpurea (Vahl) Ker Gawl.; Gladiolus purpureus Vahl; Ixia flabelliformis Salisb.; Ixia purpurea Jacq.

= Babiana purpurea =

Species of plant

Babiana purpurea is a perennial flowering plant and geophyte belonging to the genus Babiana. The species is endemic to the Western Cape and occurs from Botrivier to Bredasdorp and Robertson where it is part of the fynbos and renosterveld. The species has a range of less than 5000 km² and there are two subpopulations. The plant has lost 80% of its habitat to the establishment of vineyards and orchards over the past 60 years. One subpopulation is on commonage land in Caledon and the other is located on a road shoulder and is threatened by maintenance work and road construction.
