= Houw Hoek Hotel =

Hotel in Western Cape, South Africa

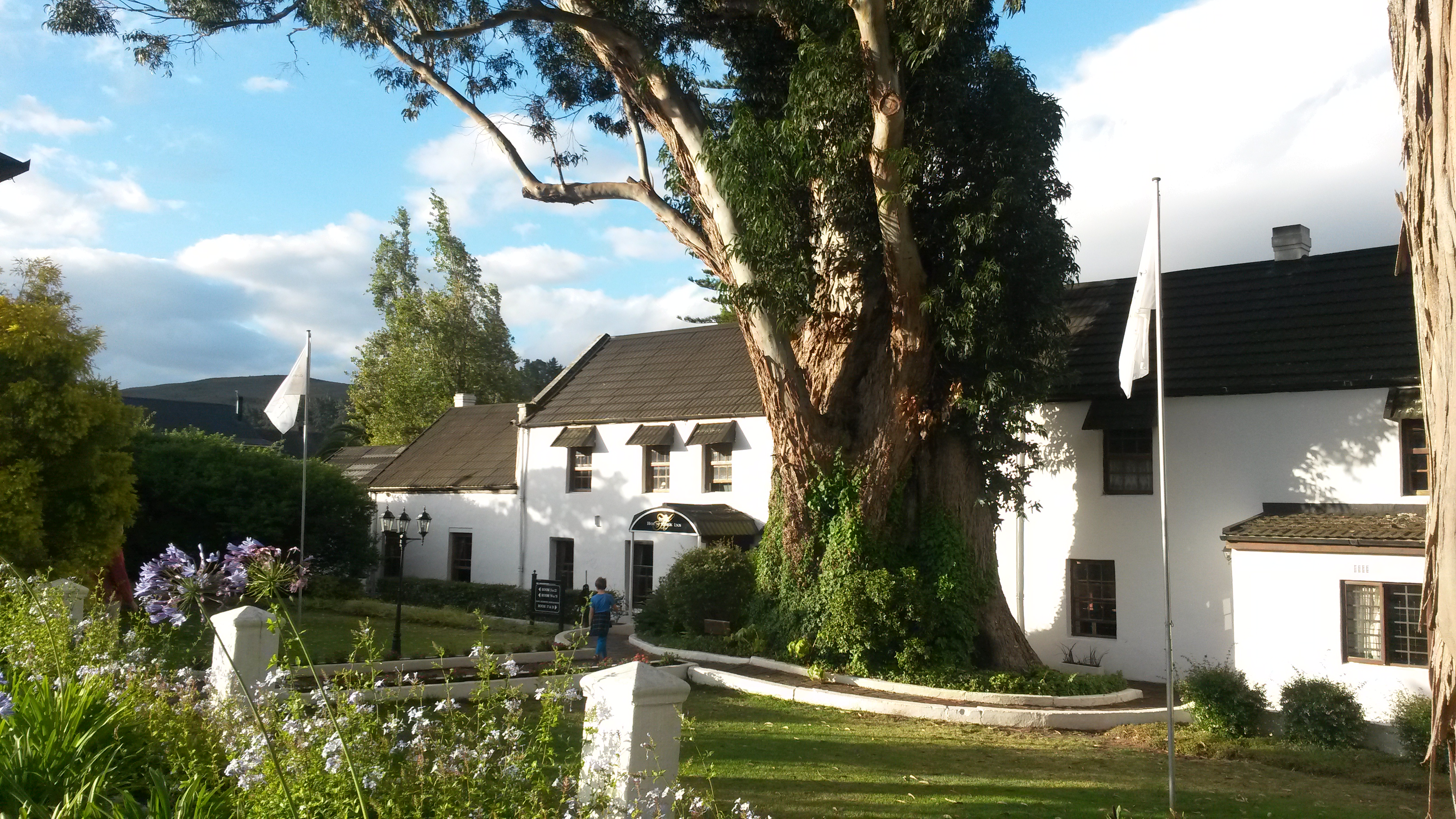

- Location within Western Cape

General information
- Location: South Africa
- Coordinates: 34°12′18.72″S 19°9′3.24″E

The Houw Hoek Hotel, previously called the Houw Hoek Inn, is a hotel on the N2 national road between Grabouw and Botrivier in South Africa, close to the summit of the Houwhoek Pass, on the Overberg branch line. It is one of the oldest licensed hotels in the country, with a ground floor dating from 1779.
