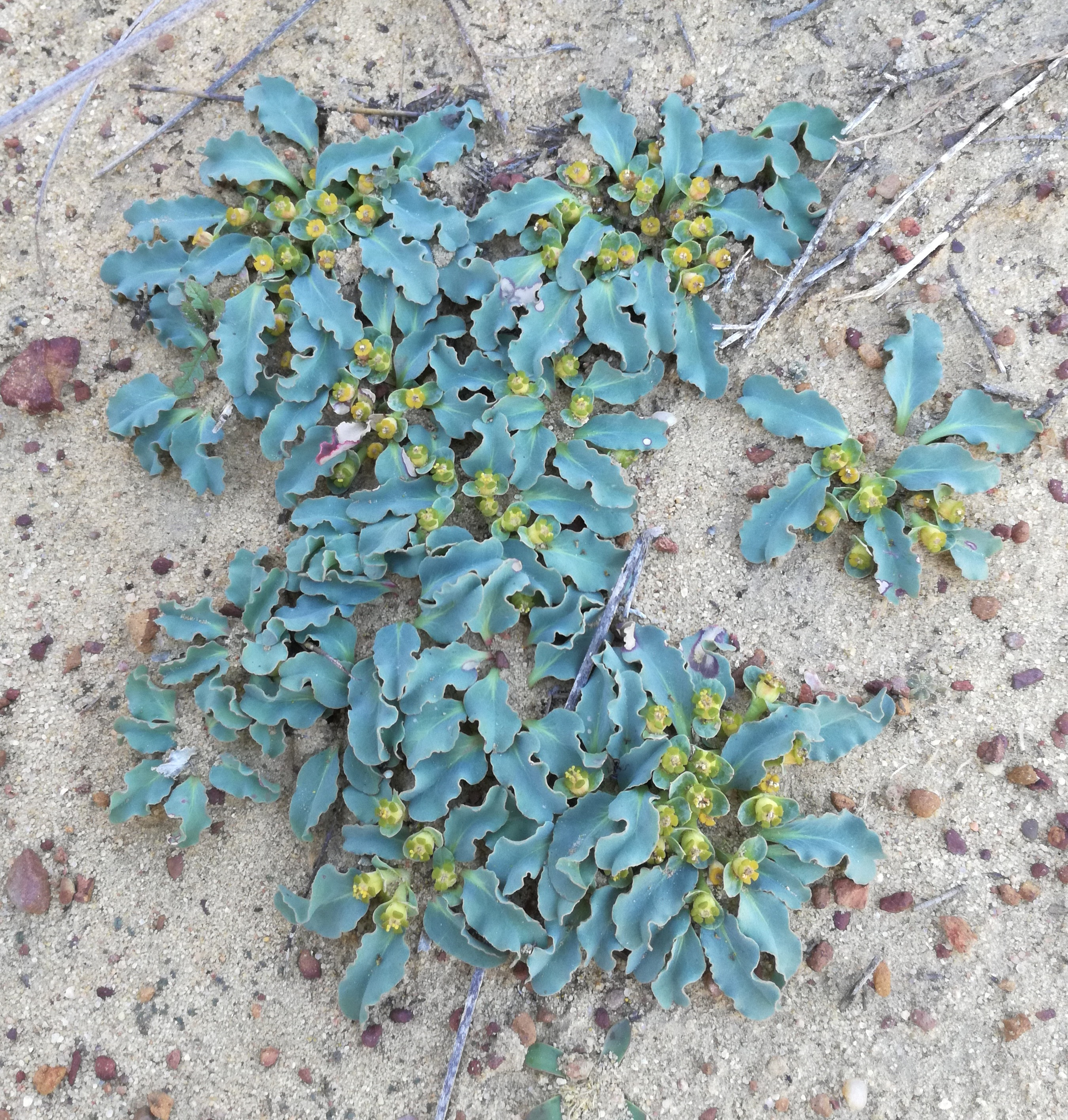
- Euphorbia tuberosa growing in sandy soil near Worcester in the Robertson Karoo

Scientific classification
- Kingdom: Plantae
- Clade: Tracheophytes
- Clade: Angiosperms
- Clade: Eudicots
- Clade: Rosids
- Order: Malpighiales
- Family: Euphorbiaceae
- Genus: Euphorbia
- Species: E. tuberosa

Binomial name
- Euphorbia tuberosa L.

= Euphorbia tuberosa =

Species of flowering plant

Euphorbia tuberosa, commonly known as '"milkball/melkbol"' or '"wilderamenas"', is a variable geophytic plant of the family Euphorbiaceae, indigenous to the western parts of South Africa.

== Description ==
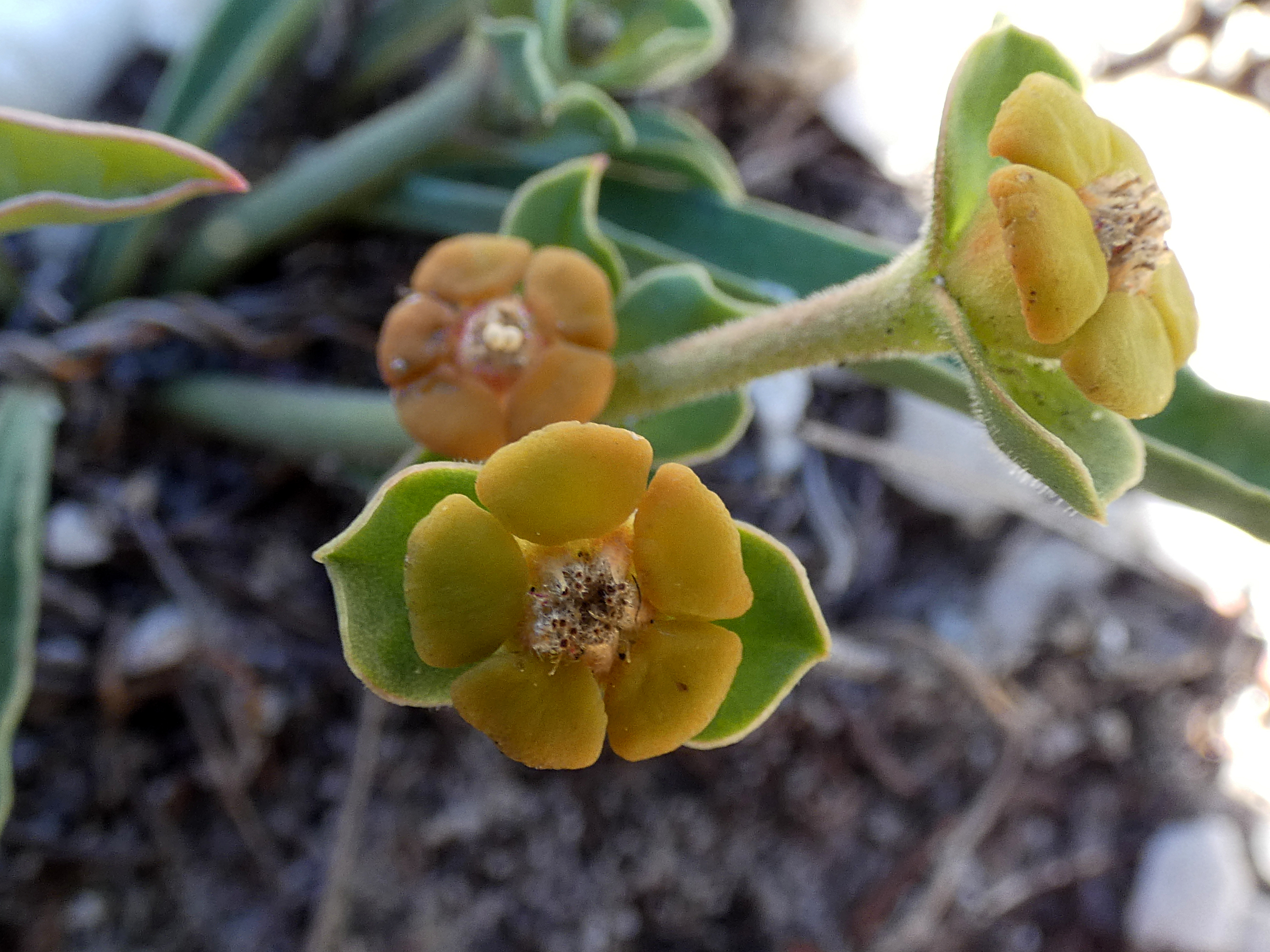
Detail of Euphorbia tuberosa flower, from near Hangklip.

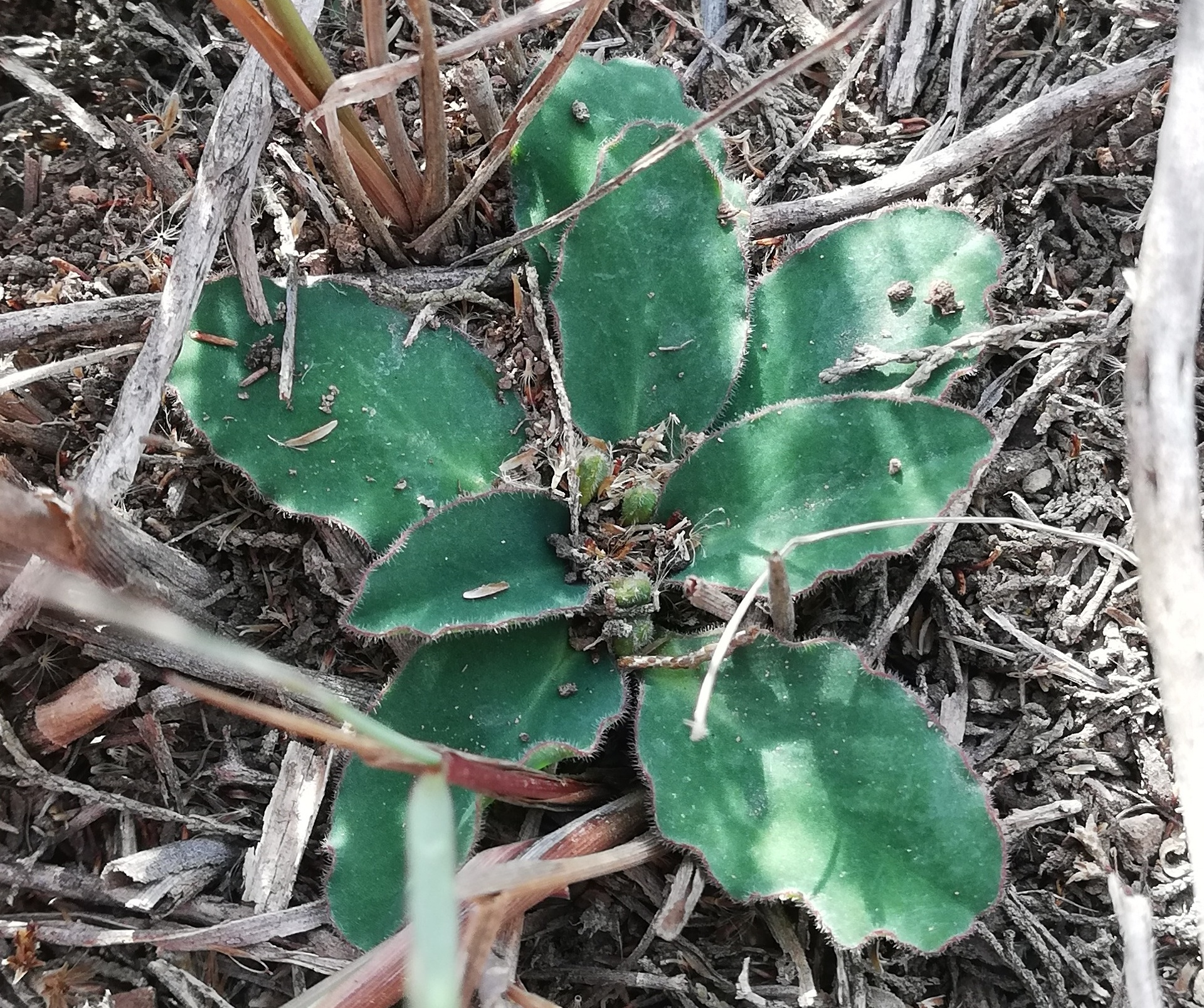
Euphorbia tuberosa, growing near Napier, in the Overberg region.

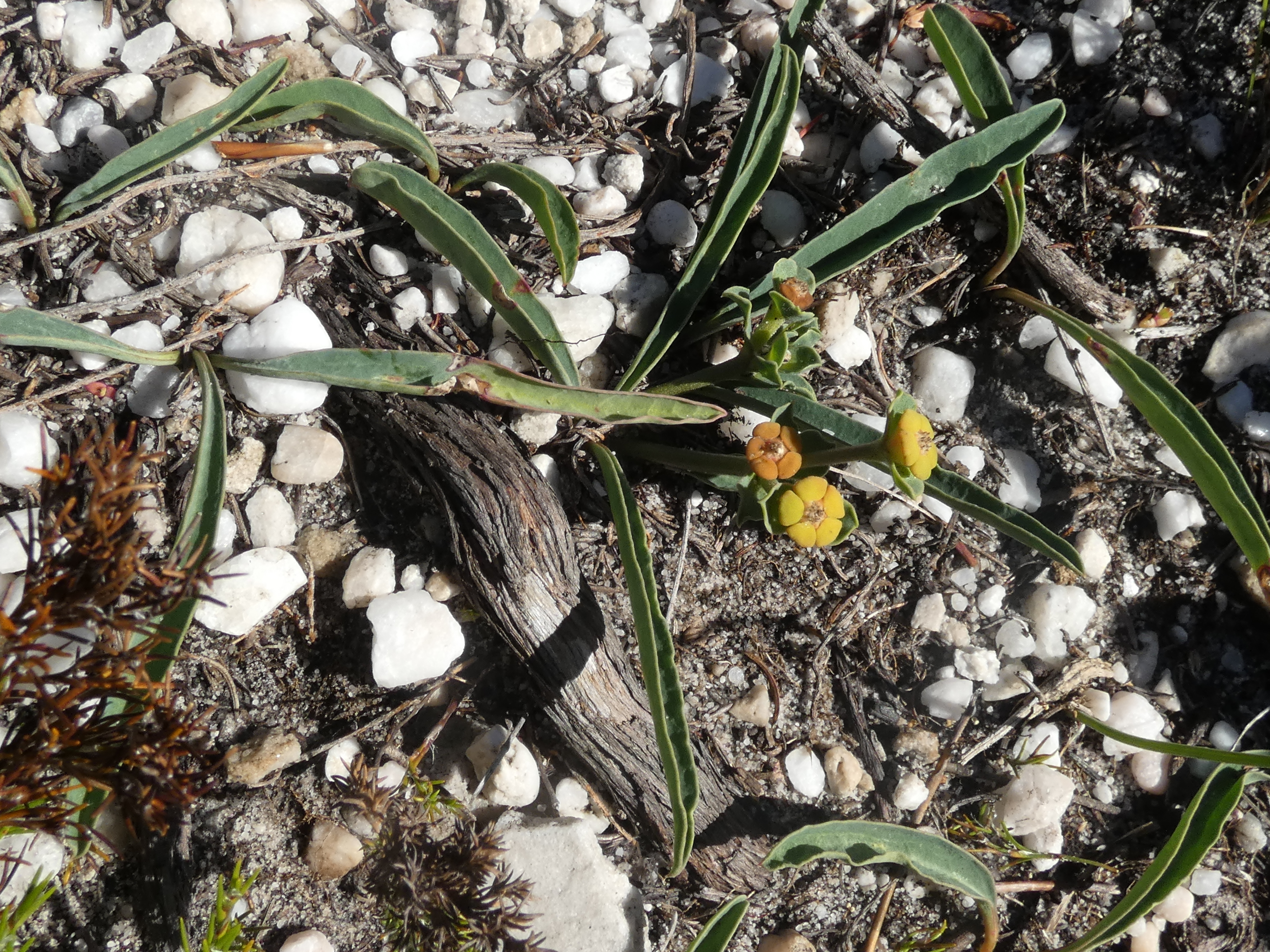
Euphorbia tuberosa, slender-leaved form from near Hangklip.

A highly variable species, that has a tuberous underground caudex. Its deciduous leaves are grey-green, often with soft, fine hair.

The leaf shape is lanceolate-to-oblong. Below the leaves' stalks they become narrower. The leaf margins are wavy or crisped, and usually curved upwards.

It is dioecious and its yellow-green 5mm flowers (cyathia) appear over the Winter, on short (1–5 cm), trailing peduncles.

=== Related species ===
This species is closely related to Euphorbia ecklonii, an Overberg species, which has wider leathery leaves that lie flat on the ground.

It is also closely related to Euphorbia silenifolia, which however has slender, linear, grass-like leaves.

A more gracile form of Euphorbia tuberosa is sometimes treated as a separate species, Euphorbia crispa (Haw.) Sweet, distinguished by its very narrow leaves, which also have more strongly wavy/crisped margins and a more prominent midrib.

== Distribution and habitat ==
Euphorbia tuberosa is indigenous to the western, winter-rainfall (dry summer) regions of South Africa, from Namaqualand in the north, to Cape Town in the south. In the Little Karoo region, it extends eastwards as far as the town of Matjiesfontein. In the Overberg region, it occurs around the town of Napier, and extends eastwards as far as the town of Riversdale.

Its habitat is usually rocky or sandy soils in exposed areas of renosterveld, fynbos or succulent karoo vegetation.
