= Erica propendens =

Scientific classification
- Kingdom: Plantae
- Clade: Tracheophytes
- Clade: Angiosperms
- Clade: Eudicots
- Clade: Asterids
- Order: Ericales
- Family: Ericaceae
- Genus: Erica
- Species: E. propendens

Binomial name
- Erica propendens Andrews

Synonyms
- Ericoides propendens (Andrews) Kuntze

Species of flowering plant

Erica propendens is a plant belonging to the genus Erica and is part of the fynbos. The species is endemic to the Western Cape. Here it occurs from the Hottentots Holland Mountains to the Kleinrivier Mountains. There are five known subpopulations but three have already been eradicated by invasive plants and agricultural activities. The other two subpopulations are fragmented and are threatened by invasive plants.
