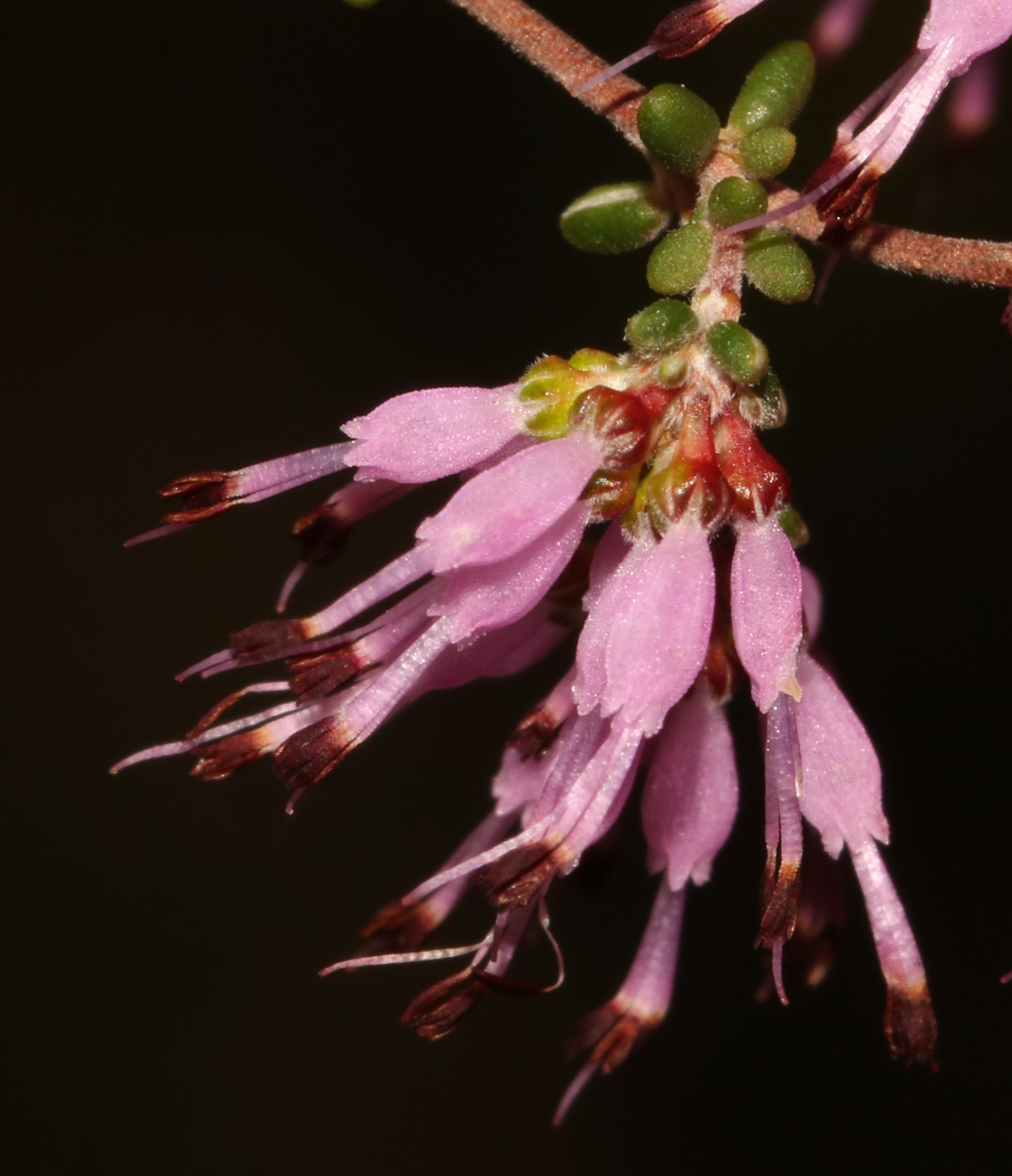

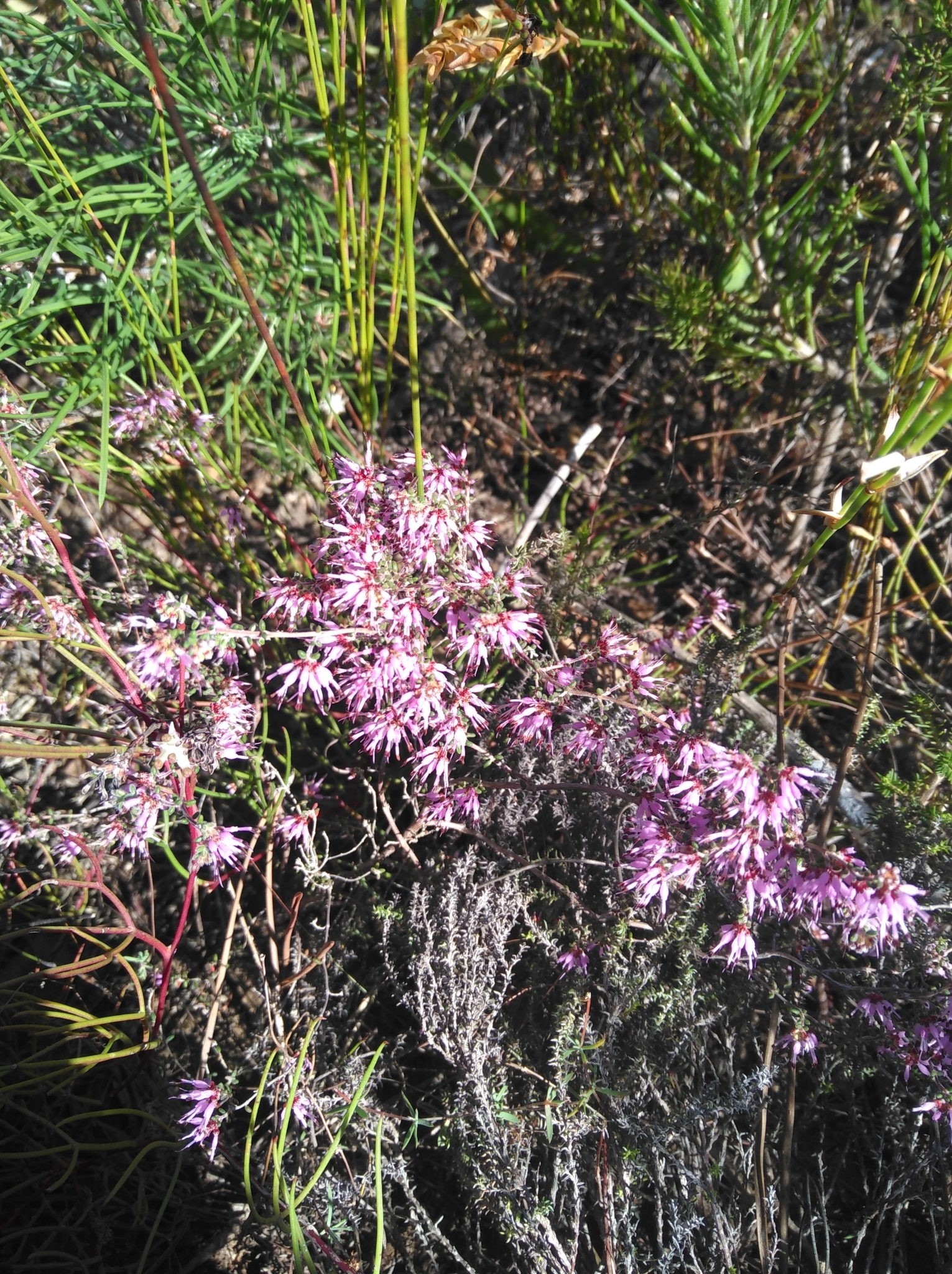

Scientific classification
- Kingdom: Plantae
- Clade: Tracheophytes
- Clade: Angiosperms
- Clade: Eudicots
- Clade: Asterids
- Order: Ericales
- Family: Ericaceae
- Genus: Erica
- Species: E. paucifolia

Binomial name
- Erica paucifolia (J.C.Wendl.) E.G.H.Oliv.

Synonyms
- Blaeria flosculosa G.Don; Blaeria paucifolia J.C.Wendl.; Erica flosculosa Salisb.; Macrolinum paucifolium Klotzsch; Simocheilus flosculosus (Salisb.) Druce; Syndesmanthus flosculosus (Salisb.) Druce; Syndesmanthus paucifolius (J.C.Wendl.) Benth.; Thoracosperma paucifolia Kuntze

= Erica paucifolia =

Species of flowering plant

Erica paucifolia is a plant that belongs to the genus Erica and is part of the fynbos. The species is endemic to the Western Cape and occurs in the Houhoek and Kleinrivier Mountains. There were seven subpopulations but only two exist, the other subpopulations have been wiped out due to suburban development and invasive plants, the latter at Honingklip.
