= Houwhoek Pass =

Pass in Western Cape, South Africa

Coordinates: 34°12′49.5″S 19°10′02.1″E

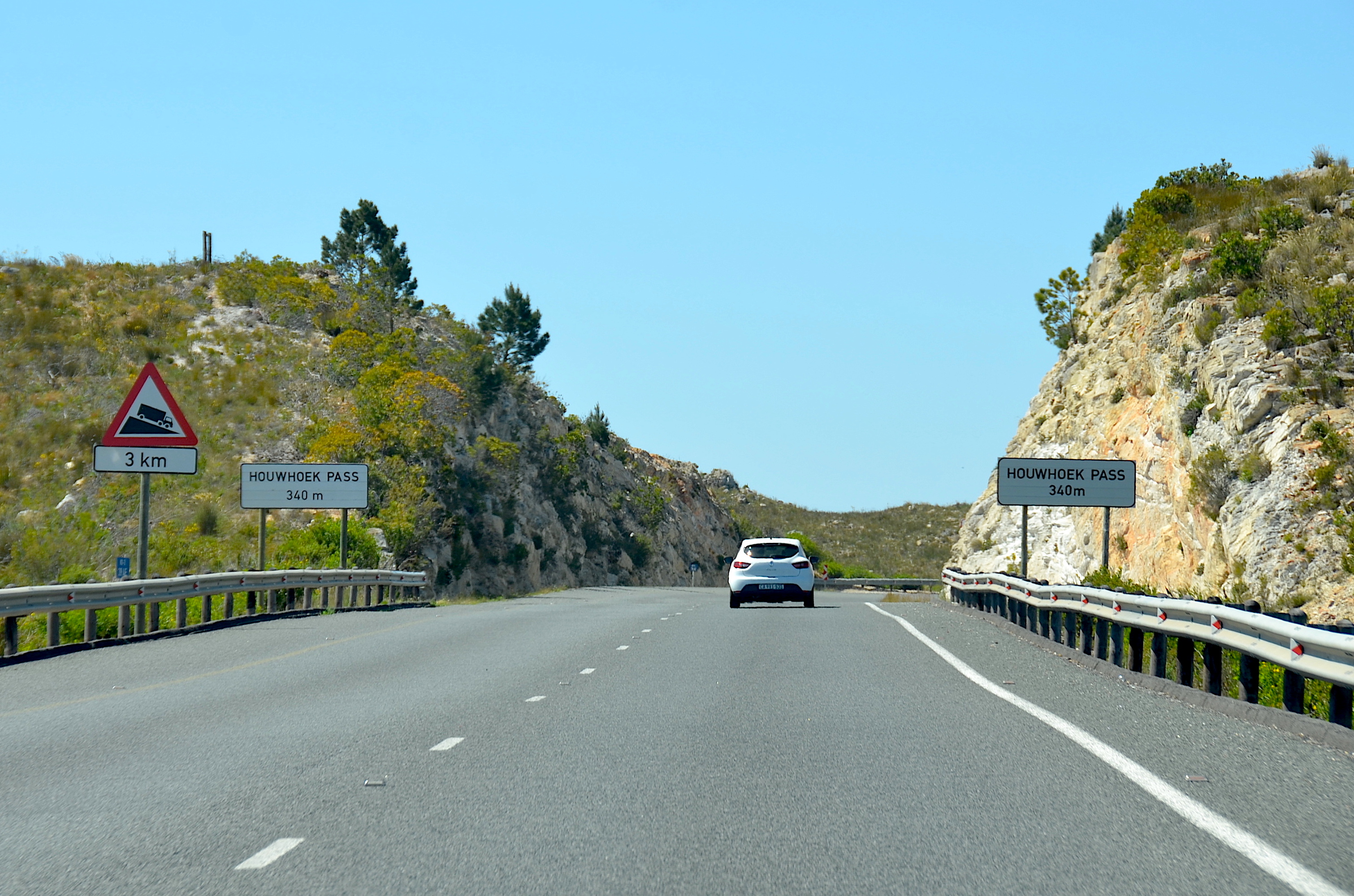
Houwhoek Pass near Botrivier

Houwhoek Pass is a pass on the N2 national road between Grabouw and Botrivier in the Western Cape province of South Africa. The pass is a dual carriageway and the summit is at 340m above sea level. The Overberg branch line as well as the gravel road of the old Houwhoek Pass are nearby, following a similar route but closer to the Jakkals River. The Houw Hoek Hotel and Houw Hoek Farm Stall are close to the summit of the pass.
