= Vegetable farming =

Growing for human consumption

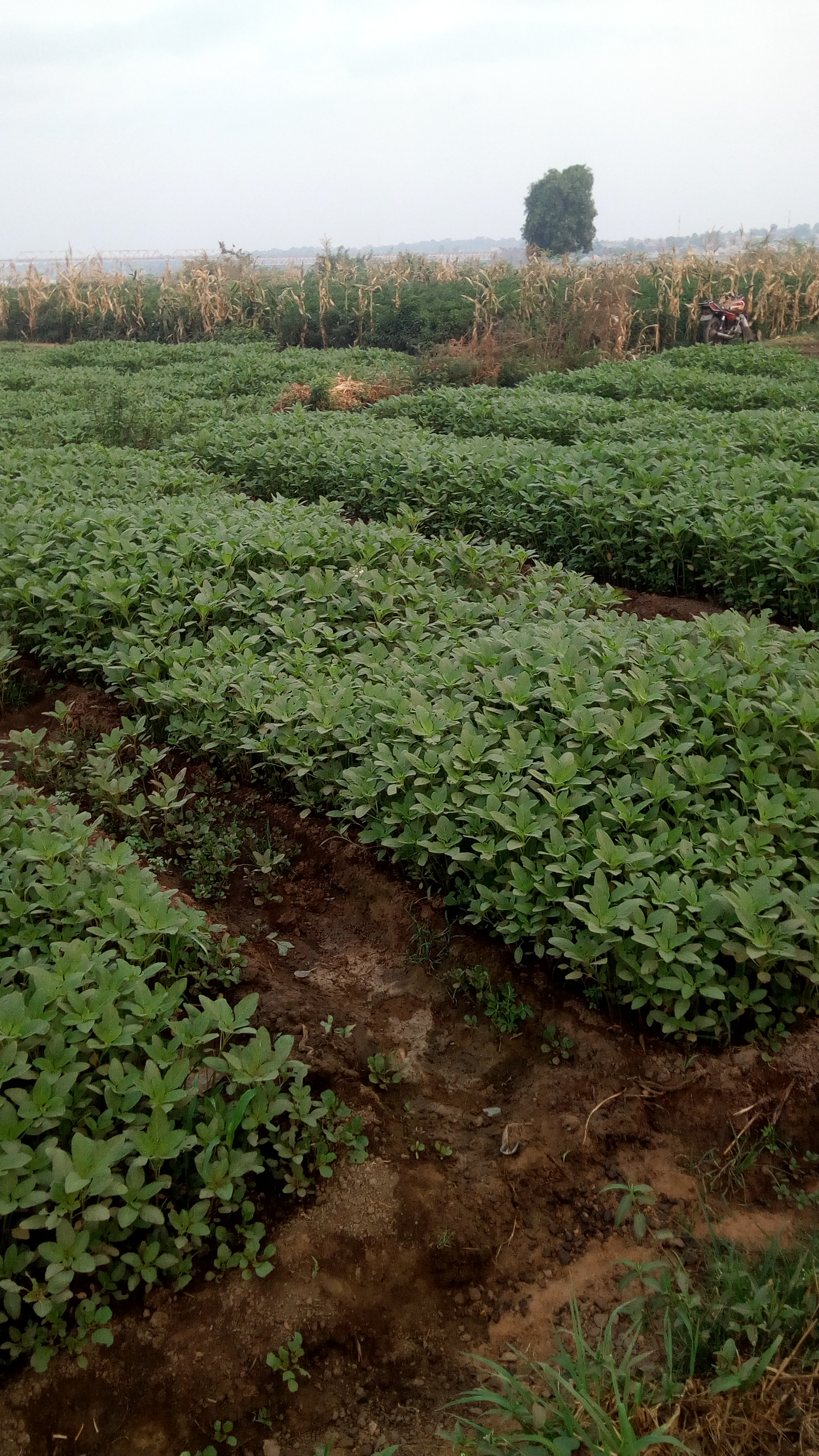
Vegetable farm

Vegetable farming is the growing of vegetables for human consumption. The practice probably started in several parts of the world over ten thousand years ago, with families growing vegetables for their own consumption or to trade locally. At first manual labour was used but in time livestock were domesticated and the ground could be turned by the plough.

More recently, mechanisation has revolutionised vegetable farming with nearly all processes being able to be performed by machine. Specialist producers grow the particular crops that do well in their locality. New methods—such as aquaponics, raised beds and cultivation under glass—are used. Marketing can be done locally in farmer's markets, traditional markets or pick-your-own operations, or farmers can contract their whole crops to wholesalers, canners or retailers.

== History ==
Originally, vegetables were collected from the wild by hunter-gatherers and entered cultivation in several parts of the world, probably during the period 10,000 BC to 7,000 BC, when a new agricultural way of life developed. At first, plants which grew locally would have been cultivated, but as time went on, trade brought exotic crops from elsewhere to add to domestic types. Nowadays, most vegetables are grown all over the world as climate permits.

Traditionally it was done in the soil in small rows or blocks, often primarily for consumption on the farm, with the excess sold in nearby towns. Later, farms on the edge of large communities could specialize in vegetable production, with the short distance allowing the farmer to get his produce to market while still fresh. The three sisters method used by Native Americans (specifically the Haudenosaunee/Iroquois) grew squash, beans and corn together so that the plants enhanced each other's growth. Planting in long rows allows machinery to cultivate the fields, increasing efficiency and output; however, the diversity of vegetable crops requires a number of techniques to be used to optimize the growth of each type of plant. Some farms, therefore, specialize in one vegetable; others grow a large variety. Due to the needs to market vegetables while fresh, vegetable gardening has high labor demands. Some farms avoid this by running u-pick operations where the customers pick their own produce.

== Modern methods ==
Over the past 100 years a new technique has emerged—raised-bed gardening, which has increased yields from small plots of soil without the need for commercial, energy-intensive fertilizers. Modern hydroponic farming produces very high yields in greenhouses without using any soil.

Additionally, the development of ripening technologies and refrigeration has reduced the problems with getting produce to market in good condition.

== Marketing ==
Several economic models exist for vegetable farms, but are generally categorized by scale. A market garden operates at a small scale, while a larger farm may grow high quantities of few vegetables and sell them in bulk to major markets or middlemen. A farm may produce for local customers, which requires a larger distribution effort. A farm may produce a variety of vegetables for sale through an on-Farm Stalls, a local farmer's markets, or a u-pick operation. Such operations differ from commodity farm products like wheat and maize which are less perishable and are sold in bulk to the a local granary. Large cities often have a central produce market which handles vegetables in a commodity-like manner, and manages distribution to most supermarkets and restaurants.

In America, vegetable farms are in some regions known as truck farms; "truck" is a noun for which its more common meaning overshadows its historically separate use as a term for "vegetables grown for market". Such farms are sometimes called muck farms, after the dark black soil in which vegetables grow well.

== Common vegetable crops ==
Farmed vegetables include:

- Fabaceae (pea family): peas, beans, lentils
- Solanaceae (nightshade family): tomatoes, eggplants, bell peppers, potatoes
- Brassicaceae (mustard family): cauliflower, cabbage, brussels sprouts, broccoli
- Allium family: onions, garlic, leek, shallot, chives
- Carrots (Apiaceae)
- Lettuce (Asteraceae)
- Cucurbit family of plants, including melon, cantaloupe, cucumber, calabash, squash, and pumpkin
- Sweet corn

== See also ==
- Agroecology
- Aquaponics
- Gardening
- Milorganite
- Orchard
- Self-sustainability
- Vegetable garden
