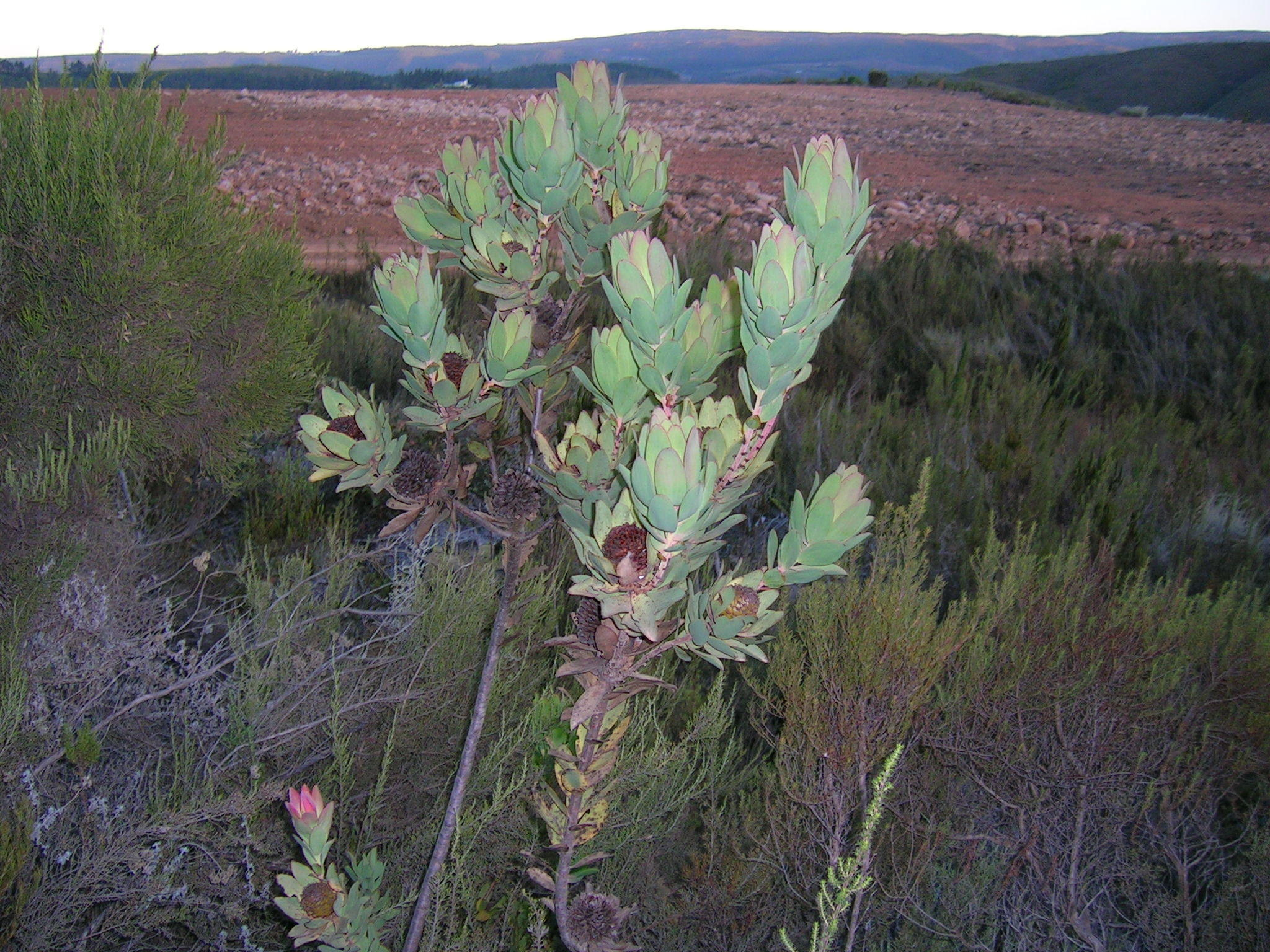

Conservation status
- Critically Endangered (IUCN 3.1)

Scientific classification
- Kingdom: Plantae
- Clade: Tracheophytes
- Clade: Angiosperms
- Clade: Eudicots
- Order: Proteales
- Family: Proteaceae
- Genus: Leucadendron
- Species: L. globosum

Binomial name
- Leucadendron globosum (Kenn. ex Andrews) I.Williams

= Leucadendron globosum =

Species of plant

Leucadendron globosum, the Grabouw conebush, is a flower-bearing shrub belonging to the genus Leucadendron. It forms part of the fynbos biome. The plant is native to the Western Cape, South Africa.

== Description ==
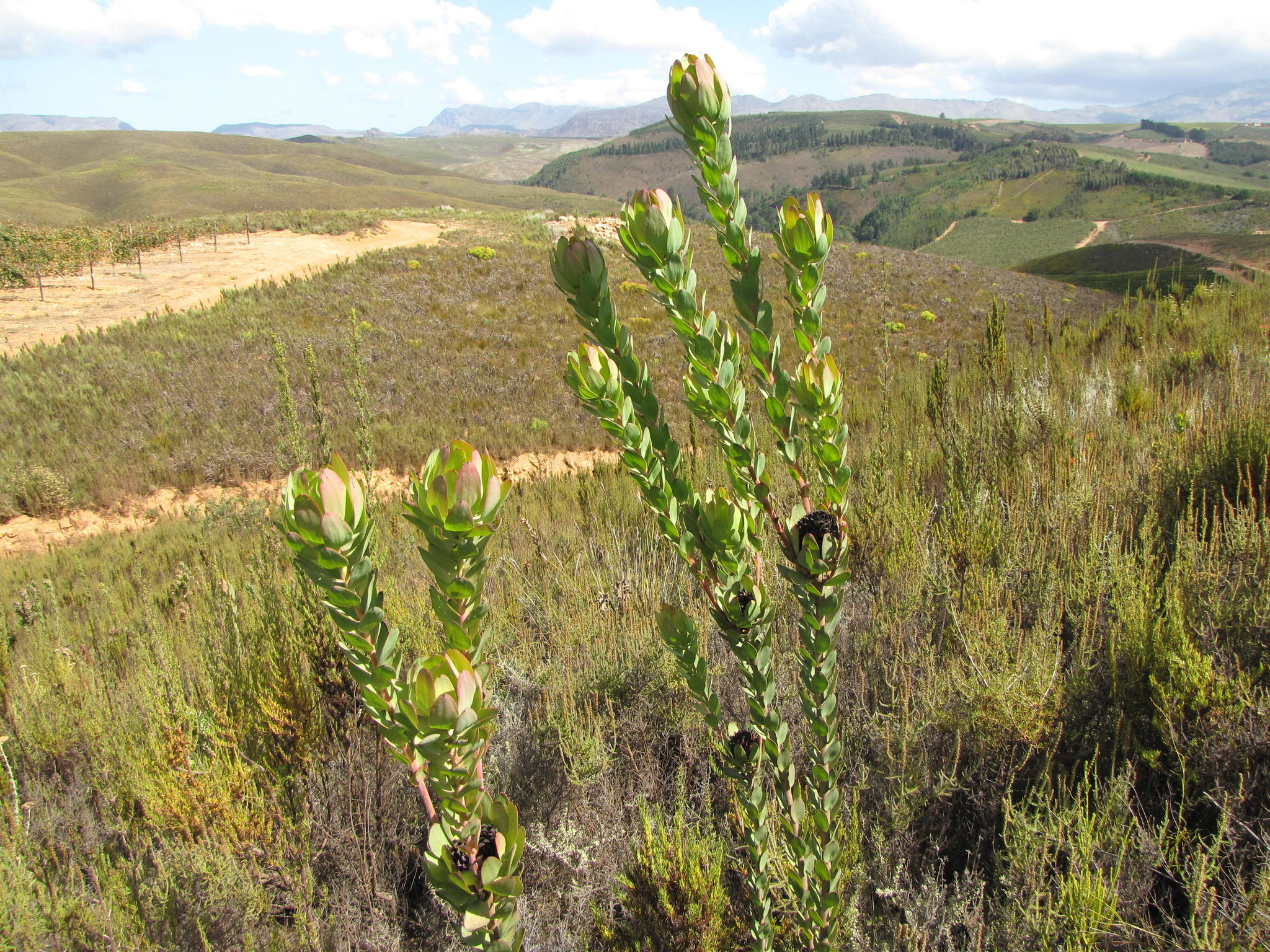

The shrub grows 2 m (6.6 ft) tall and flowers from September to October. The plant dies after a fire but the seeds survive. The seeds are stored in a toll on the female plant and fall two months after flowers are formed from the toll to the ground. The plant is unisexual and there are separate plants with male and female flowers, which are pollinated by insects.

In Afrikaans, it is known as Grabouwtolbos.

== Distribution and habitat ==
The plant occurs from Grabouw to Houhoek Pass in the Elgin valley. It grows in loamy soil on style, at southern slopes at altitudes of 220–300 m (720–980 ft).
