= Senecio sophioides =

Scientific classification
- Kingdom: Plantae
- Clade: Tracheophytes
- Clade: Angiosperms
- Clade: Eudicots
- Clade: Asterids
- Order: Asterales
- Family: Asteraceae
- Genus: Senecio
- Species: S. sophioides

Binomial name
- Senecio sophioides DC.

South African plant species

Senecio sophioides is a species of plant from South Africa.

== Description ==
This diffuse plant is covered in small hairs and glands. It grows up to 20 cm (7.9 in) tall. The pinnatisect leaves have linear lobes and may sometimes have one or two teeth. They have small, white terminal callouses.

Flowers are present between July and October. They are yellow or purple in colour and are borne in radiate flowerheads on long stalks.

== Distribution and habitat ==
This species is endemic to the Western Cape of South Africa. It grows on lower to middle sandstone slopes between Calendon and the Cedarberg.

== Conservation ==
This species is considered to be of least concern by the South African National Biodiversity Institute, even though it is rarely recorded.
