= Disa lineata =

Scientific classification
- Kingdom: Plantae
- Clade: Tracheophytes
- Clade: Angiosperms
- Clade: Monocots
- Order: Asparagales
- Family: Orchidaceae
- Subfamily: Orchidoideae
- Genus: Disa
- Species: D. lineata

Binomial name
- Disa lineata Bolus

Species of flowering plant

Disa lineata is a perennial plant and geophyte that belongs to the genus Disa and is part of the fynbos. The plant is endemic to the Western Cape and occurs from the Cederberg to the Kleinrivier Mountains, where it grows on the slopes. The plant is considered rare. The species does not grow in direct runoff water.
