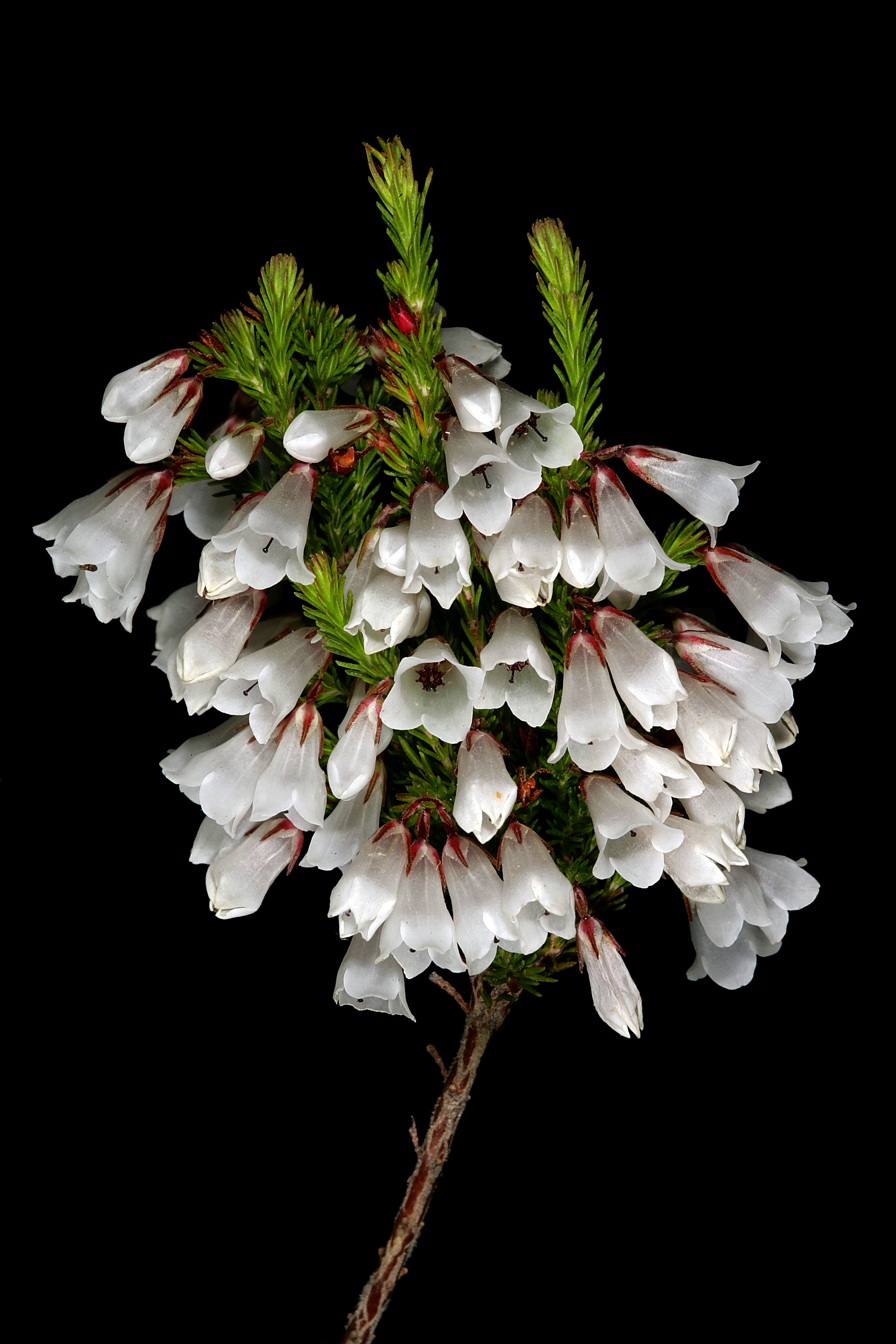

Scientific classification
- Kingdom: Plantae
- Clade: Tracheophytes
- Clade: Angiosperms
- Clade: Eudicots
- Clade: Asterids
- Order: Ericales
- Family: Ericaceae
- Genus: Erica
- Species: E. plena

Binomial name
- Erica plena L.Bolus

= Erica plena =

Species of flowering plant

Erica plena is a plant belonging to the genus Erica and is part of the fynbos. The species is endemic to the Western Cape where it occurs in the Akkedisberg near Caledon. The plant has a range of around 24 km² and there are a few thousand plants in the Akkedis Conservation Area. Invasive plants such as the Hakea species are periodically removed. The plant is considered rare.
