= Erica exleeana =

Scientific classification
- Kingdom: Plantae
- Clade: Tracheophytes
- Clade: Angiosperms
- Clade: Eudicots
- Clade: Asterids
- Order: Ericales
- Family: Ericaceae
- Genus: Erica
- Species: E. exleeana

Binomial name
- Erica exleeana E.G.H.Oliv.

Synonyms
- Erica absinthoides E.Mey. ex Klotzsch; Philippia leeana Klotzsch; Salaxis leeana (Klotzsch) D.Dietr.

Species of flowering plant

Erica exleeana is a plant belonging to the genus Erica and forming part of the fynbos. The species is endemic to the Western Cape. The plant has an area of occurrence of 8 548 km² and occurs from the Cape Peninsula to the Riviersonderend Mountains and also the Kogelberg and Kleinrivier Mountains.
