= Erica rhodopis =

Scientific classification
- Kingdom: Plantae
- Clade: Tracheophytes
- Clade: Angiosperms
- Clade: Eudicots
- Clade: Asterids
- Order: Ericales
- Family: Ericaceae
- Genus: Erica
- Species: E. rhodopis

Binomial name
- Erica rhodopis (Bolus) Bolus

Synonyms
- Eremia rhodopis Bolus

Species of flowering plant

Erica rhodopis is a plant belonging to the genus Erica and is part of the fynbos. The species is endemic to the Western Cape where it occurs at Botrivier and Perdekloof. There are currently only two subpopulations left which are threatened by the establishment of vineyards, invasive plants and the construction of polo fields. Wildfires also remain a threat.
