= Protem, South Africa =

Protem
- Location within Western Cape Location within South Africa
- Coordinates: 34.265°S 20.084°E
- Country: South Africa
- Province: Western Cape
- District: Overberg
- Municipality: Cape Agulhas
- Time zone: UTC+2 (SAST)
- PO box: 7281
- Area code: 028

Protem is a hamlet some 30 kilometres (19 mi) north of Bredasdorp and 40 kilometres (25 mi) south-west of Swellendam. The name is an abbreviation of Latin pro tempore, "for the time being". The centre was to have served as a temporary railway terminal on the line from Caledon to Swellendam, but the rest of the line was never constructed.
