= Overberg branch line =

Railway line in Western Cape, South Africa

Map of the Overberg branch line

The Overberg branch line is a railway line in the Western Cape, South Africa. It runs from Cape Town through Somerset West and Caledon to Bredasdorp.

== Route ==
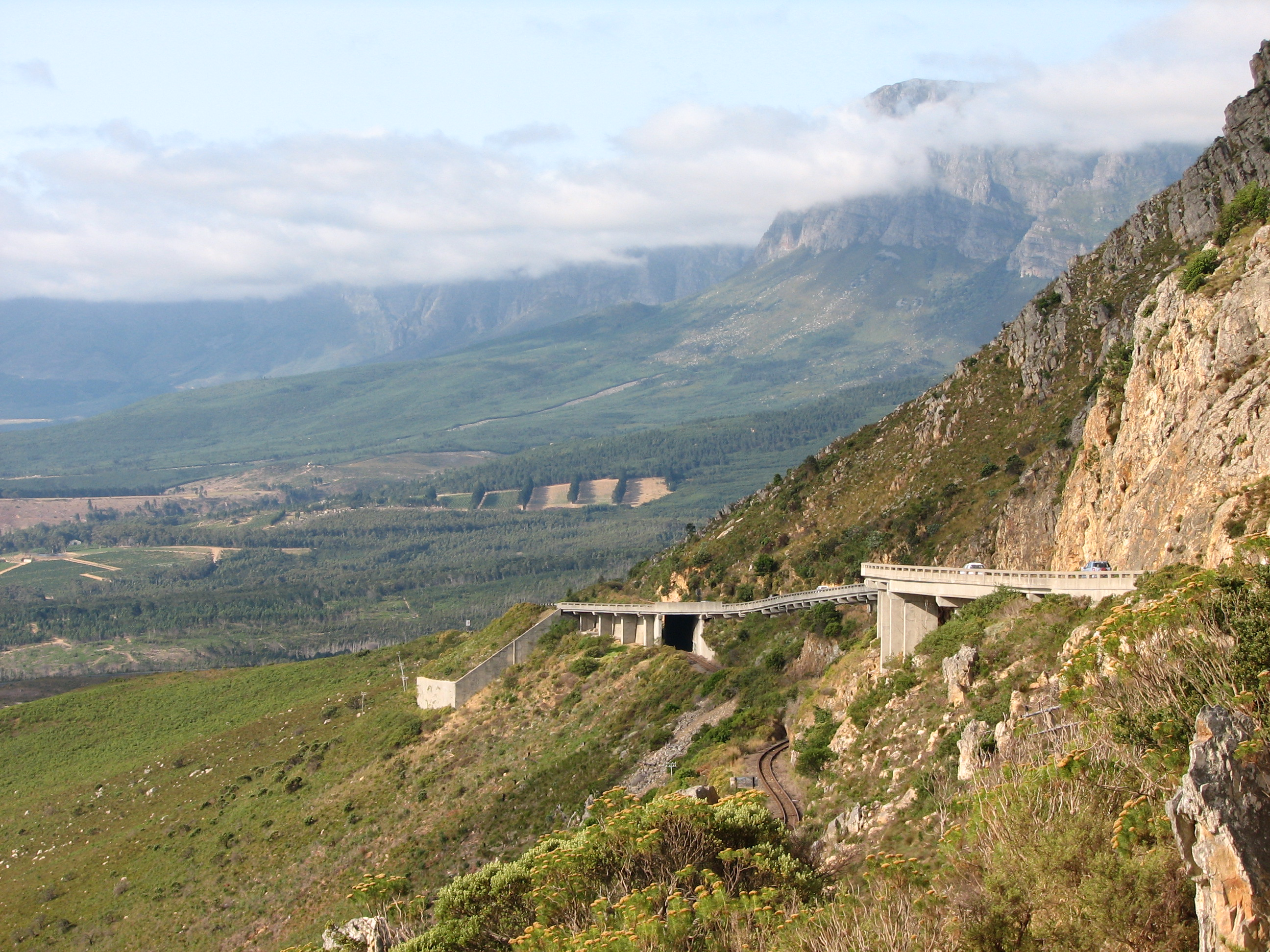
The line passing under the N2 national road on Sir Lowry's Pass

The line branches from the Bellville–Stellenbosch line at Eerste River, from which it runs through Faure and Firgrove to Somerset West. From Van der Stel station in Somerset West a short line branches to the right to Strand. After leaving Somerset West the line passes through Sir Lowry's Pass Village and climbs Sir Lowry's Pass. At the summit of the pass the line reaches an elevation of 415 metres (1,362 ft); the summit tunnel is 217 metres (712 ft) long. The line passes through the fruit-farming area of Elgin before descending the Jakkals River valley to Botrivier. From Botrivier it runs across the Overberg plain through Caledon to a junction at Klipdale. From Klipdale one line continues east to Protem, while another goes south to Bredasdorp. Trains from Cape Town to Bredasdorp (or vice versa) cannot pass directly through the junction at Klipdale, but must first pass around a balloon loop. Bredasdorp is the southernmost railway station in Africa.

The line is single-track, and electrified only as far as Strand. Metrorail services of the Northern Line operate from Cape Town through Bellville to Strand; the rest of the line has no regular passenger service.

== History ==
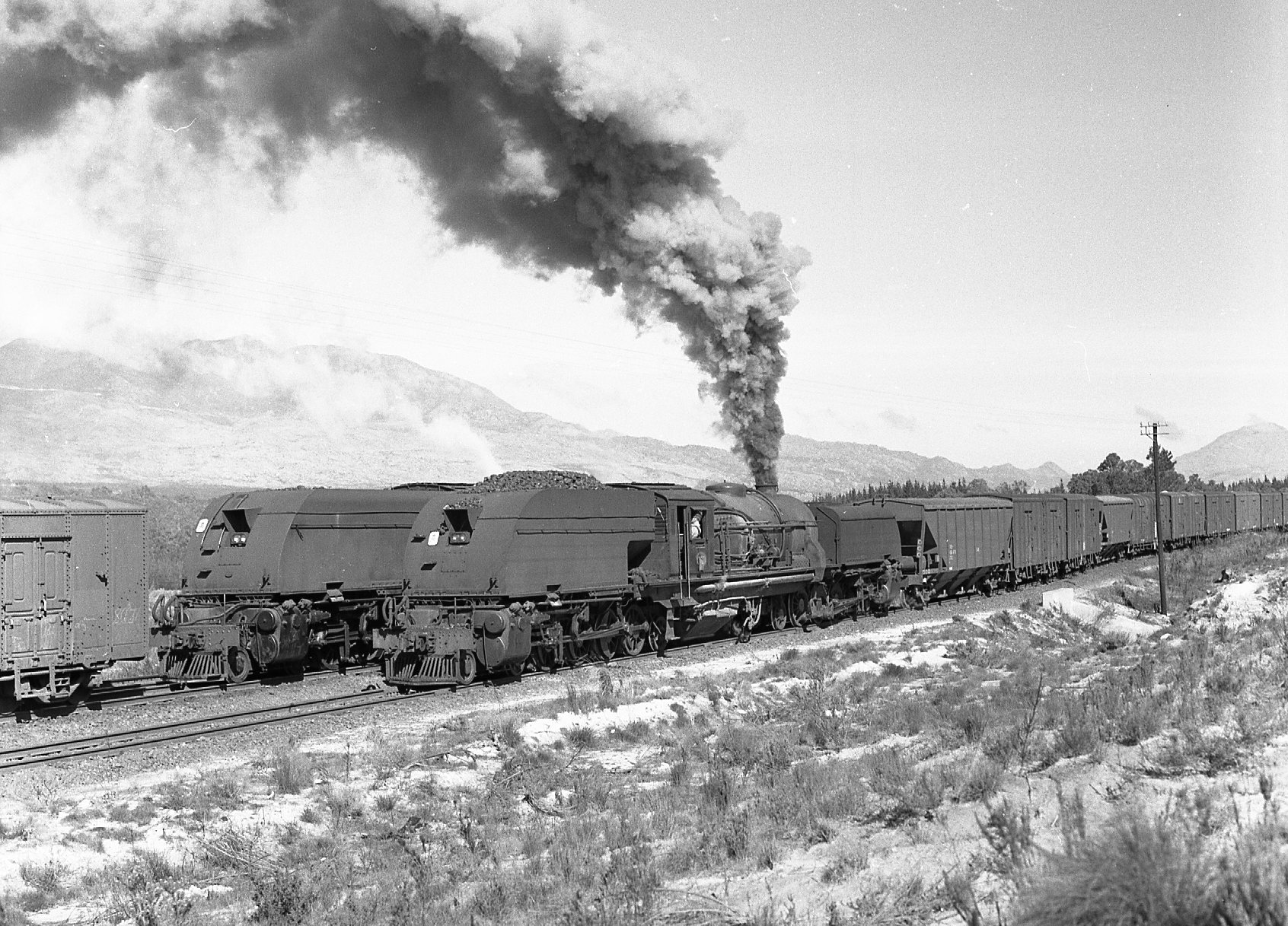
Class GEA locomotives passing at Steenbras in 1973

The railway arrived at Eerste River in 1862, as part of the construction of the Cape Town–Wellington railway line, the first in the then Cape Colony. A branch to Somerset West opened by the Cape Government Railways on 21 October 1889, and further to Sir Lowry's Pass Village on 1 February 1890. The Hottentots-Holland mountains were a significant obstacle to any further development, and construction of a line over Sir Lowry's Pass only started on 12 July 1899. The effects of the Anglo-Boer War slowed progress, but by 1 August 1902 the line was opened to Caledon. On 16 December 1905 the short branch to Strand was opened.

Two extensions of the line from Caledon were possible: eastwards towards Riviersonderend and Swellendam, with the ultimate possibility of reaching Mossel Bay; or southwards towards Napier and Bredasdorp. In 1906 a conference of delegates from the Overberg was unable to agree on a route for a continuation of the line. Meanwhile, by early 1906 the New Cape Central Railway (NCCR), a private company, had reached Mossel Bay with its line from Worcester via Swellendam, and was having difficulty running it at a profit; this did not bode well for the profitability of a line from Caledon to Swellendam.

Construction on an extension began in 1914, reaching Rietpoel on 5 January 1914, Klipdale on 6 April 1914, and Protem on 30 June 1915. This route was a compromise, Klipdale being about halfway between Riviersonderend and Bredasdorp. "Protem" means "for the time being", reflecting the intention to continue the line to Swellendam at some time in the future. Ultimately, though, the NCCR was taken over by the South African Railways (SAR) in 1925, making such an extension unnecessary.

In the mid-1920s the SAR embarked on a new phase of railway building, as part of which the line from Klipdale junction south to Bredasdorp was opened on 19 April 1924.
