= Dennehof, South Africa =

Dennehof
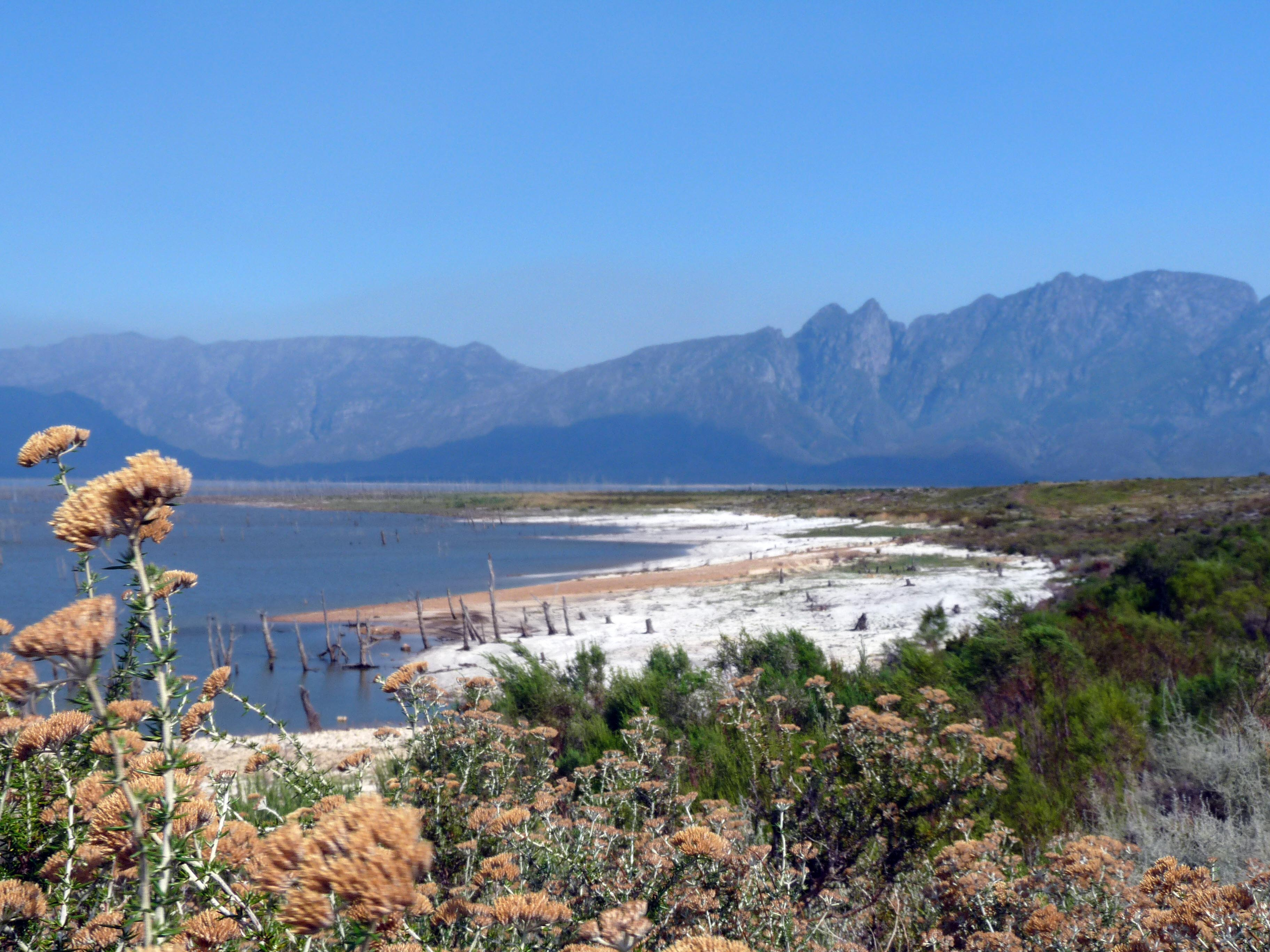
- The Theewaterskloof Dam near Dennehof.

- Location within Western Cape Location within South Africa
- Coordinates: 34°02′20″S 19°17′20″E
- Country: South Africa
- Province: Western Cape
- District: Overberg
- Municipality: Theewaterskloof

Government
  - Councillor: Dawid Jooste (DA)

Area
  - Total: 1.09 km^{2} (0.42 sq mi)

Population (2011)
  - Total: 121
  - Density: 111/km^{2} (288/sq mi)

Racial makeup (2011)
  - Black African: 4.9%
  - Coloured: 27.0%
  - Indian/Asian: 3.3%
  - White: 64.8%

First languages (2011)
  - Afrikaans: 53.7%
  - English: 41.3%
  - Other: 5.0%
- Time zone: UTC+2 (SAST)
- Postal code (street): 2196

Dennehof is a settlement in Overberg District Municipality in the Western Cape province of South Africa.
