= Dennehof, Gauteng =

Dennehof
- Location within Gauteng Location within South Africa
- Coordinates: 26.1099°S 28.0574°E
- Country: South Africa
- Province: Gauteng
- Municipality: City of Johannesburg

Area
  - Total: 0.17 km^{2} (0.066 sq mi)

Population (2001)
  - Total: 9
  - Density: 53/km^{2} (140/sq mi)
- Time zone: UTC+2 (SAST)
- Postal code (street): 2196

Dennehof is a suburb of Johannesburg, South Africa. It is located in Region E of the City of Johannesburg Metropolitan Municipality.
