= Riviersonderend =

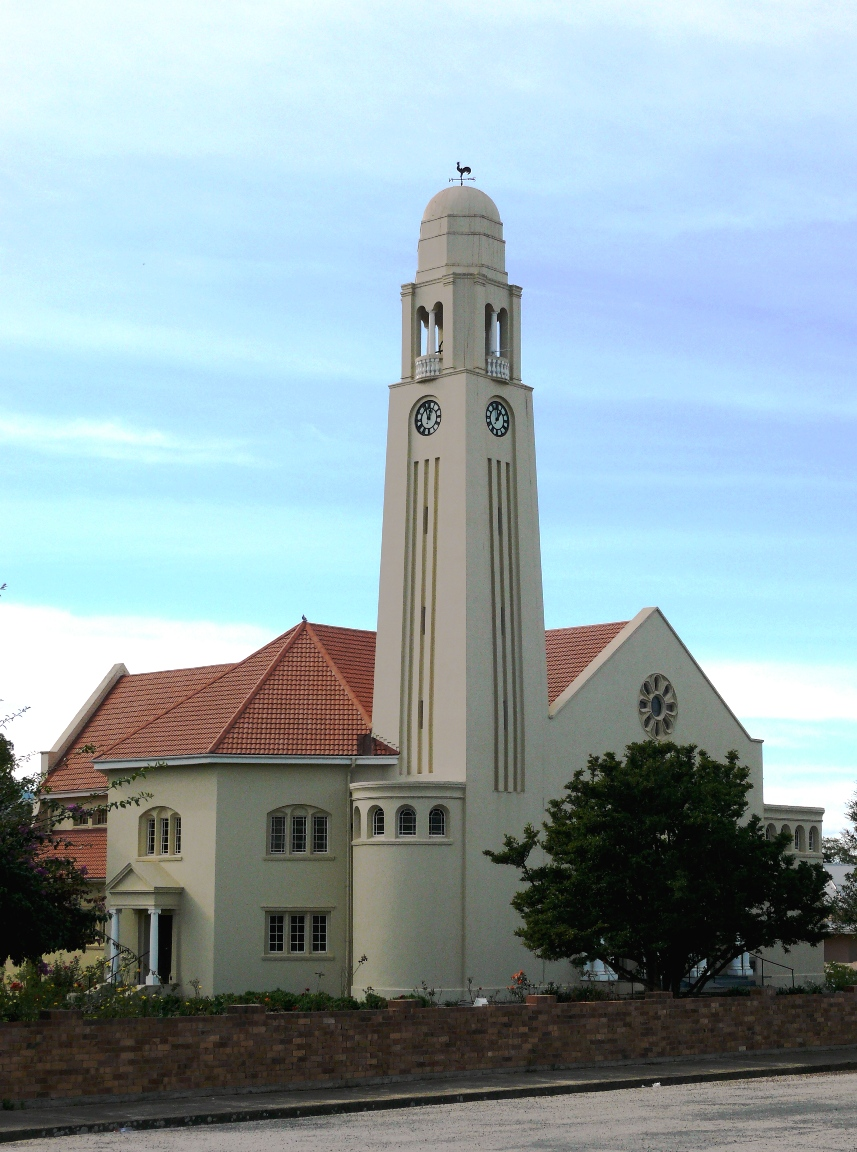
- The Dutch Reformed Church of Riviersonderend

- Location within Western Cape Location within South Africa
- Coordinates: 34°09′01″S 19°54′52″E
- Country: South Africa
- Province: Western Cape
- District: Overberg
- Municipality: Theewaterskloof

Government
  - Councillor: Piet Stander (DA)

Area
  - Total: 5.57 km^{2} (2.15 sq mi)

Population (2011)
  - Total: 5,245
  - Density: 942/km^{2} (2,440/sq mi)

Racial makeup (2011)
  - Black African: 12.6%
  - Coloured: 75.4%
  - Indian/Asian: 0.5%
  - White: 10.9%
  - Other: 0.6%

First languages (2011)
  - Afrikaans: 86.5%
  - Xhosa: 8.3%
  - English: 3.1%
  - Other: 2.1%
- Time zone: UTC+2 (SAST)
- Postal code (street): 7250
- PO box: 7250
- Area code: 028

Riviersonderend is a village in the Overberg region of the Western Cape, South Africa, about 140 kilometres (87 mi) east of Cape Town. It is located on a loop of the Sonderend River, from which it takes its name. In the census of 2011 it was recorded as having a population of 5,245. The N2 national road passes through Riviersonderend, forming its main street; it is 161 kilometres (100 mi) by road from central Cape Town.

== History ==
The village was established in 1923, when Edith S V McIntyre sold a portion of her farm, Tierhoek, to the local Dutch Reformed church council for 6000 pounds. First known as "Rivier Zonder End" (Dutch for "river without end"), the name later changed to the Afrikaans "Riviersonderend".

The name itself was originally a literal translation of the Khoikhoi name "Kannakamkanna" ("river without end").
