= Farm Stall =

Small road-side shops in South Africa

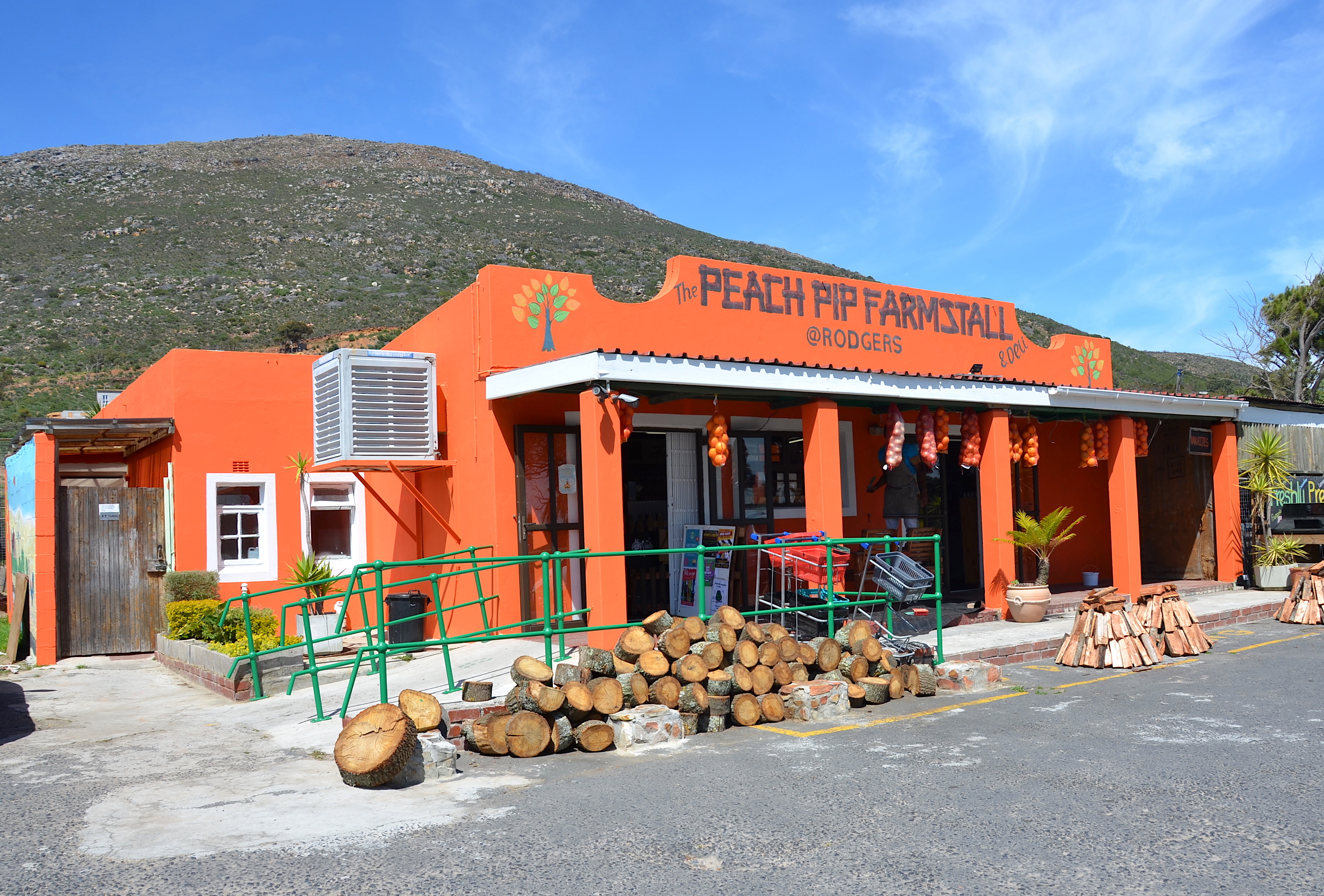
Peach Pip Farmstall in Kommetjie (South Africa)

A Farm Stall or padstal (Afrikaans) is an integral component of South African culture. From the Western Cape to the Eastern Cape these pitstops are a must on every road trip. They took their beginning in little stalls built next to roads, some with a history of more than 40 years.

Each farm stall has its own unique story, they are independent, trade with local goods and are an absolute highlight for food lovers. Their stock varies from own and adjacent homemade farm products like jams, butter, bread, cheese, dried fruit & nuts, free-range eggs, pies, coffee or wines up to wrought-iron works, wooden furniture and other handicrafts. Local farmworkers can earn an extra income by producing the jams, preserves and also clothing which is available to buy. Sought-after also the wood for a popular braaivleis.

Most farm stalls go along with a coffee shop where typical South African food like roosterkoek (a kind of roll unique to South Africa, cooked on grill and slightly charred), lemon meringue pie, koeksister, bobotie and beverages like ginger beer is offered. Farm stalls are open seven days a week.
