= Botrivier =

Botrivier Botla
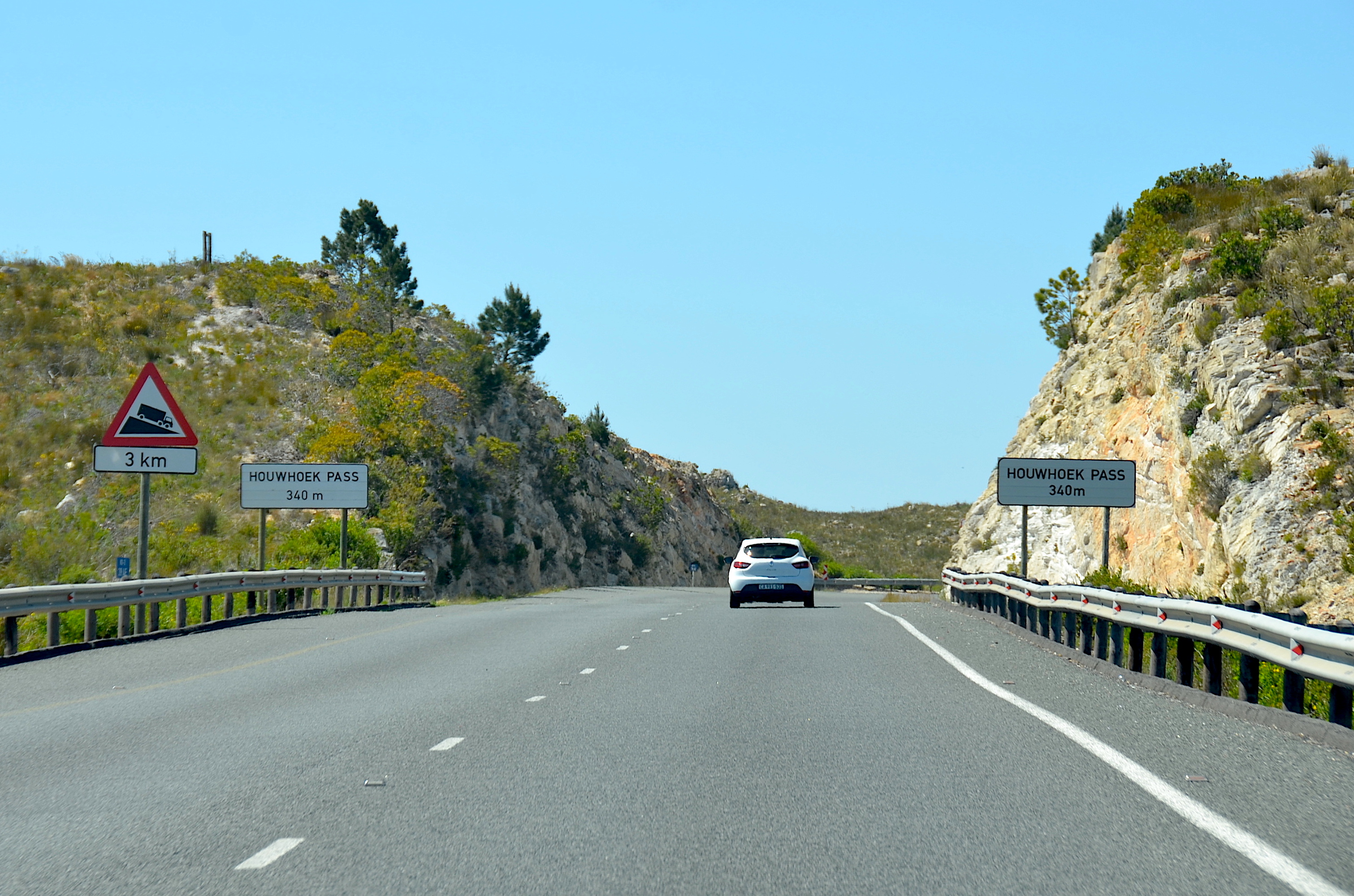
- The Houwhoek Pass near Botrivier.

- Location within Western Cape Location within South Africa
- Coordinates: 34°13′33″S 19°12′18″E
- Country: South Africa
- Province: Western Cape
- District: Overberg
- Municipality: Theewaterskloof

Government
  - Counsellor: Pearl Stanfliet (DA)

Area
  - Total: 1.93 km^{2} (0.75 sq mi)

Population (2011)
  - Total: 5,505
  - Density: 2,850/km^{2} (7,390/sq mi)

Racial makeup (2011)
  - Black African: 22.0%
  - Coloureds: 68.6%
  - Indian or Asian: 0.5%
  - White: 7.4%
  - Other: 1.5%

First languages (2011)
  - Afrikaans: 75.7%
  - Xhosa: 14.9%
  - English: 5.2%
  - Sotho: 1.3%
  - Other: 2.9%
- Time zone: UTC+2 (SAST)
- Postal code (street): 7185
- PO box: 7185
- Area code: 028

Botrivier is a small town of approximately 10 000 people, situated in the Overberg region of the Western Cape in South Africa.

Village in the former Caledon district, 93 km southeast of Cape Town. It takes its name from the Bot River on the west bank of which it is situated. The form Botrivier is preferred for official use.

== History ==
Long before Western settlement, this east-facing glen was home to herders, the KhoeKhoe, who pastured their livestock in rich pastures along the banks of the “Couga River”. The river flows south towards the marsh Botrivier estuary, and was for centuries the home of tribes who lived there for the fresh water in the desert Cape.

“Rich in fat”, was the river’s name – a tribute to the area’s reputation for “lots of butter”, which the early settlers came in search of to barter for. It was this creamy “botter”, as it was known in Afrikaans, which gave the “Bot River” its ultimate name.

Later, the hamlet was to become an 18th-century outpost for the Dutch East India Company at Compagnes Drift farm in Botrivier, now home to Beaumont Wines. At the same time that a company of soldiers was stationed at the drift at Bot River to monitor who crossed the Cape frontier, Compagnes Drift also developed as a loan farm. Loan farms were owned by the Dutch East India Company. Under this scheme, burghers could rent the land, farm it and profit from it, but they could not own it.

As Napoleon extended his control over Europe, including Holland, the British sought to preempt possible French control of the Cape. In January 1806 British forces defeated the Dutch at the battle of Blouberg. Among the handful of Dutch burghers who rendered loyal service in the battle was Servaas Daniel de Kock. As a reward for his service, the Dutch East India Company gave him ownership of the farm he had worked on loan. De Kock planted wheat, vines, fruit trees, vegetables and turmeric—a spice that was in high demand in the kitchens of the Cape of Good Hope.

A major event in the life of Botrivier was the arrival of the railway line from Cape Town to Caledon in 1902. Similar to the American westward railway expansion, the Cape tracks were forged through the Hottentots-Holland mountain range above Somerset West – an engineering feat - and this brought the village of Bot River to its feet when the first trains ran in 1912, allowing villagers, farmers and traders to journey to the Town faster than ever before., and the traffic grew from the City into the countryside too.
