= Overberg =

Region of the Western Cape in South Africa, east of Cape Town

Coordinates: 34.63321°S 19.89212°E

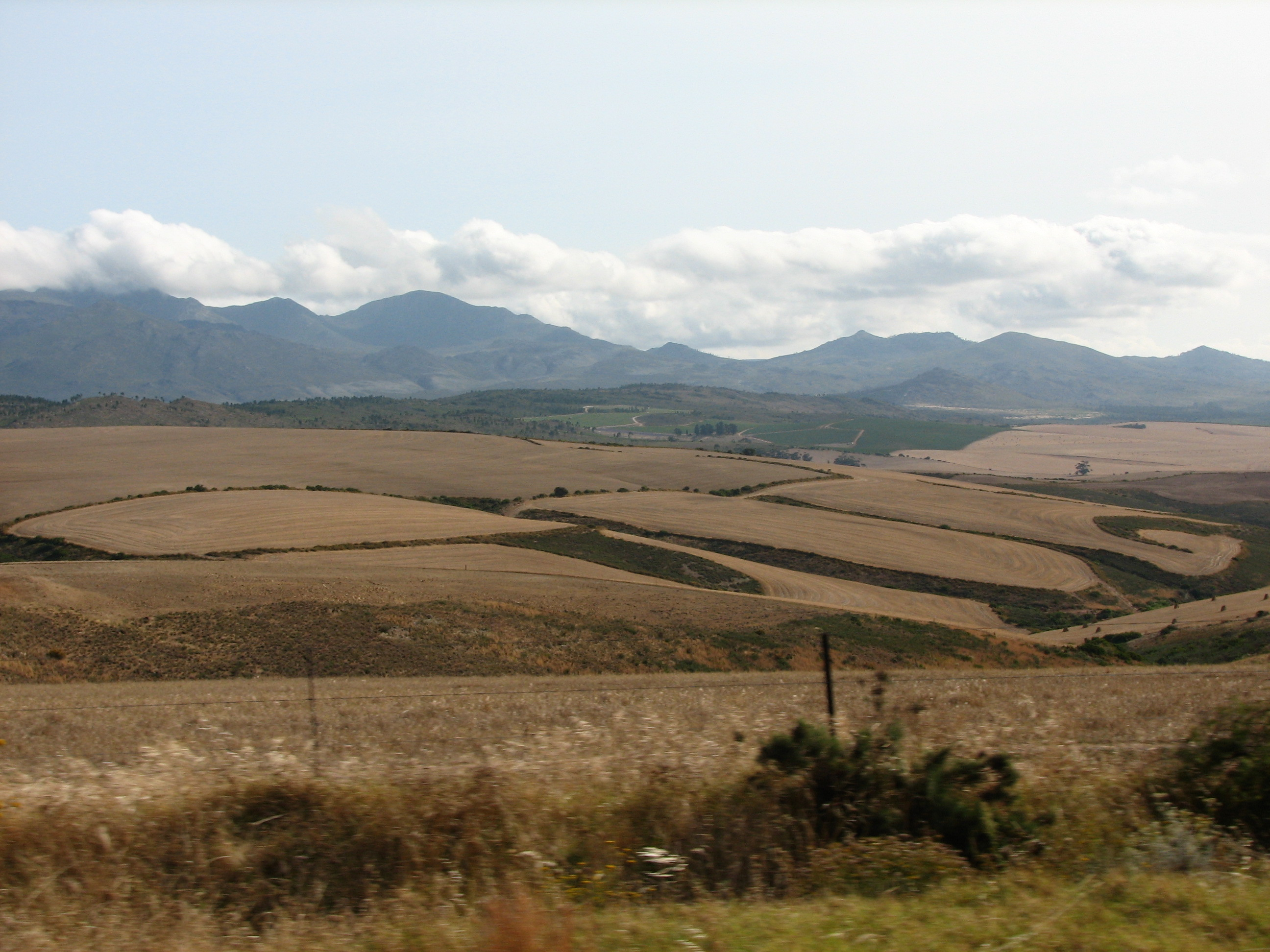
Typical summer (dry season) Overberg landscape with the Babilonstoring Mountains beyond between Caledon and Bot River

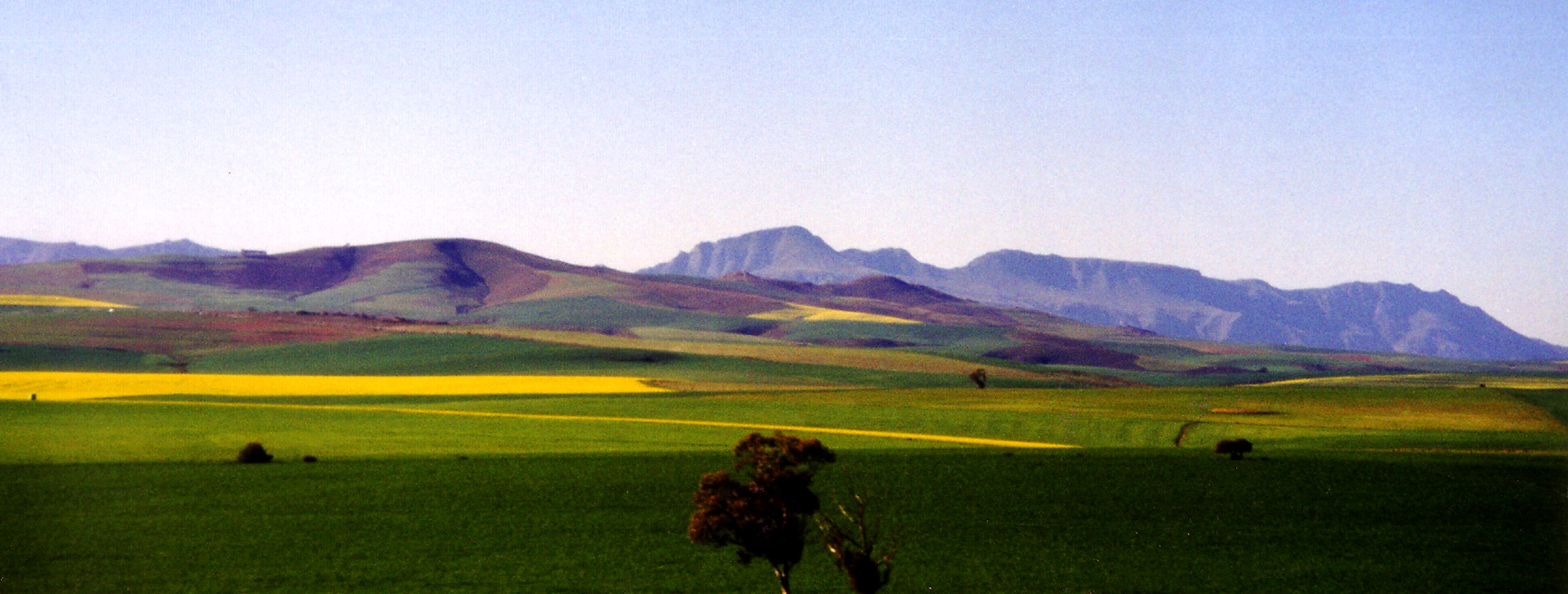
Overberg in the early spring with canola fields in the foreground and Riviersonderend Mountains in the background

Map of the Overberg

Overberg is a region in South Africa to the east of Cape Town beyond the Hottentots-Holland mountains. It lies along the Western Cape Province's south coast between the Cape Peninsula and the region known as the Garden Route in the east. The boundaries of the Overberg are the Hottentots-Holland mountains in the West; the Riviersonderend Mountains, part of the Cape Fold Belt, in the North; the Atlantic and Indian Oceans in the South and the Breede River in the East.

The area has always been considered as the breadbasket of the Cape and is largely given to grain farming — mainly wheat. The wheat fields are a major breeding ground for South Africa's national bird, the blue crane. Another important crop in the Overberg is fruit, with the Elgin Valley producing about 60 percent of the total annual apple crop of about 819 000 tonnes (2012 data).

Nestled in the Overberg, one can find the Kogelberg Biosphere Reserve (recognised and registered with UNESCO) populated with a large diversity of flowering plants not found anywhere else in the fynbos biome.

The major towns are Hermanus, Caledon, Bredasdorp, Grabouw and Swellendam and the region includes Cape Agulhas, the southernmost point of Africa. The landscape is dominated by gently to moderately undulating hills enclosed by mountains and the ocean.

The name, derived from Over 't Berg, means "over the (Hottentots-Holland) mountain" and is a reference to the region's location relative to Cape Town.

== Overberg gallery ==
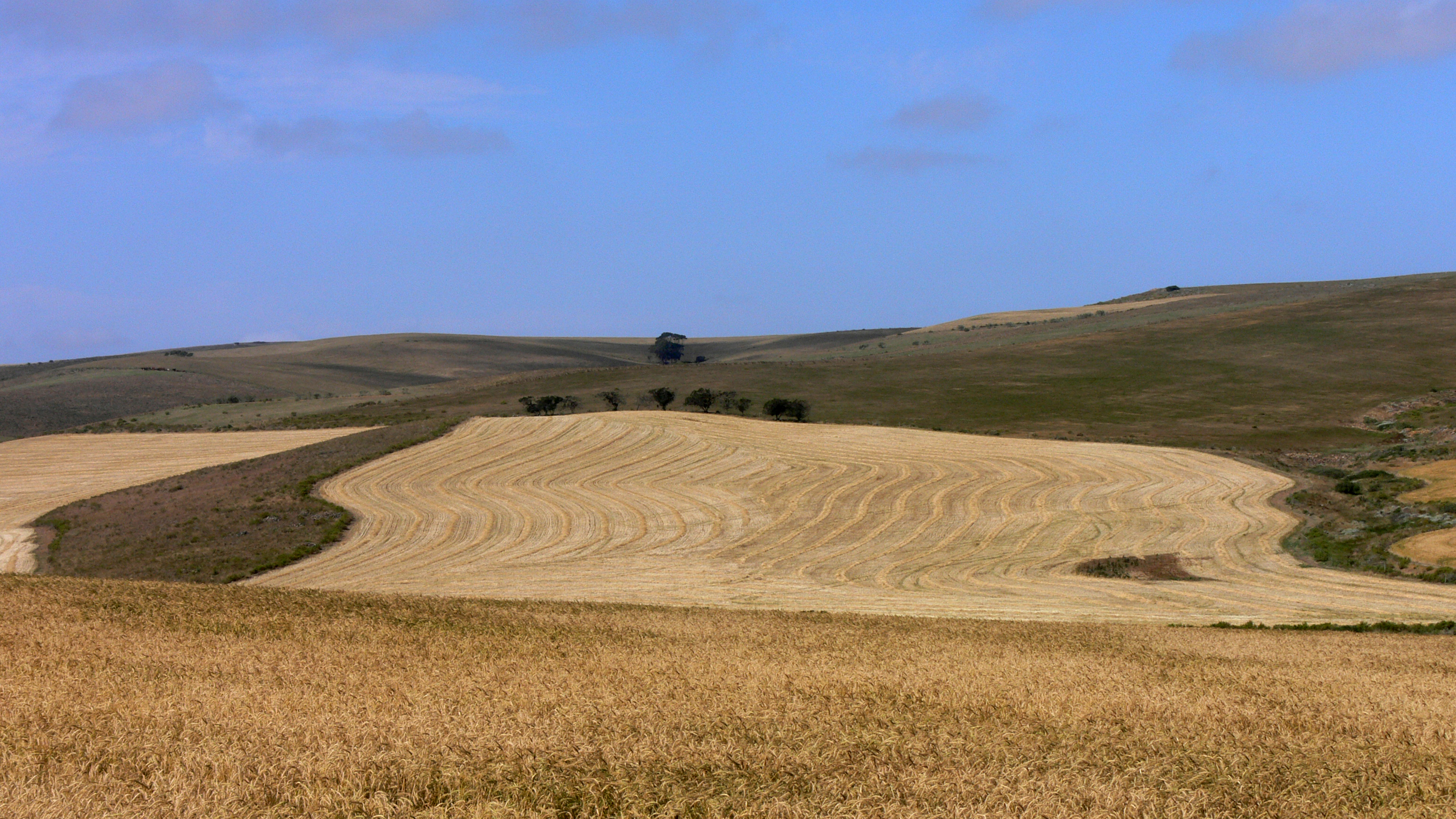

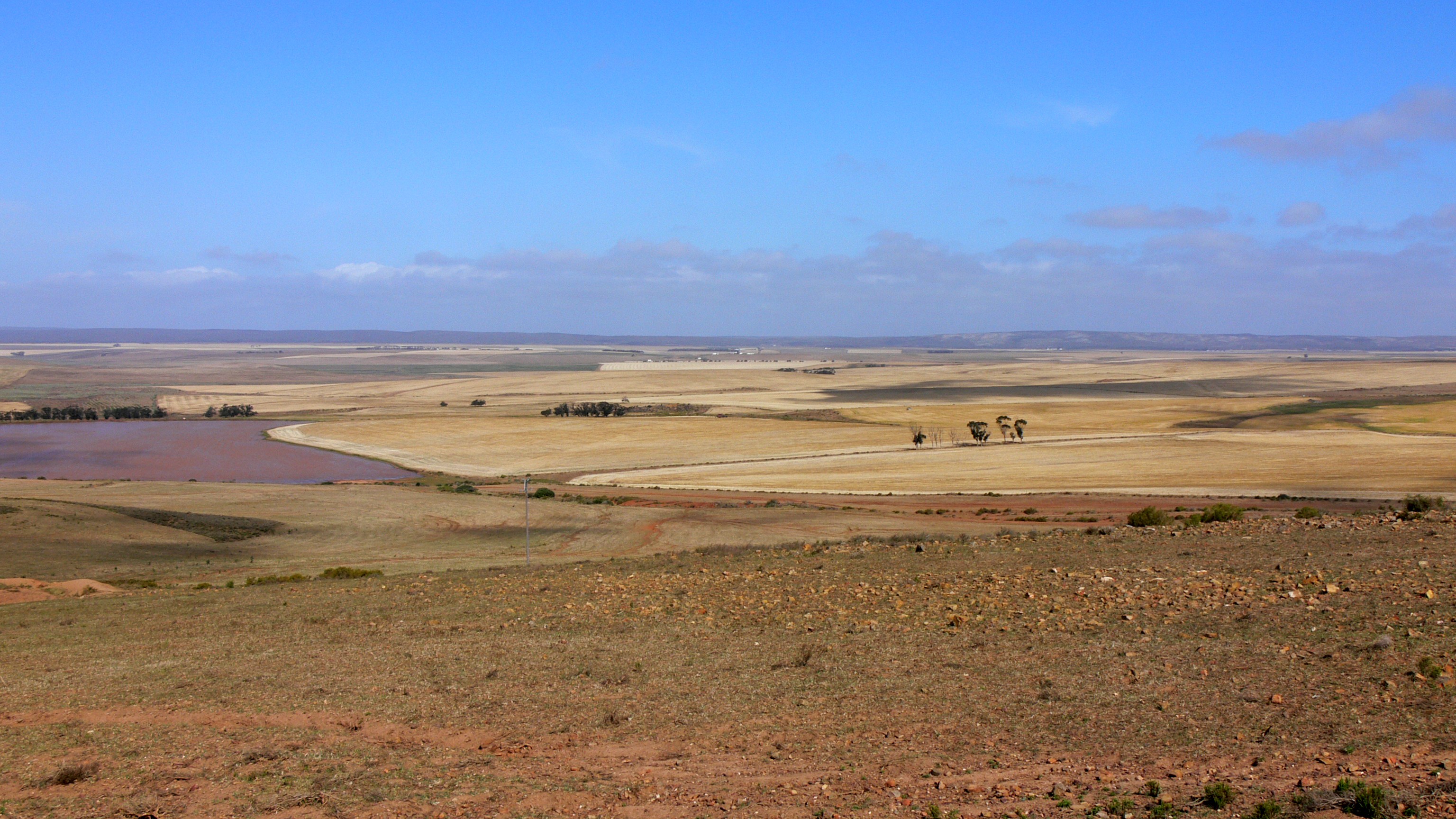

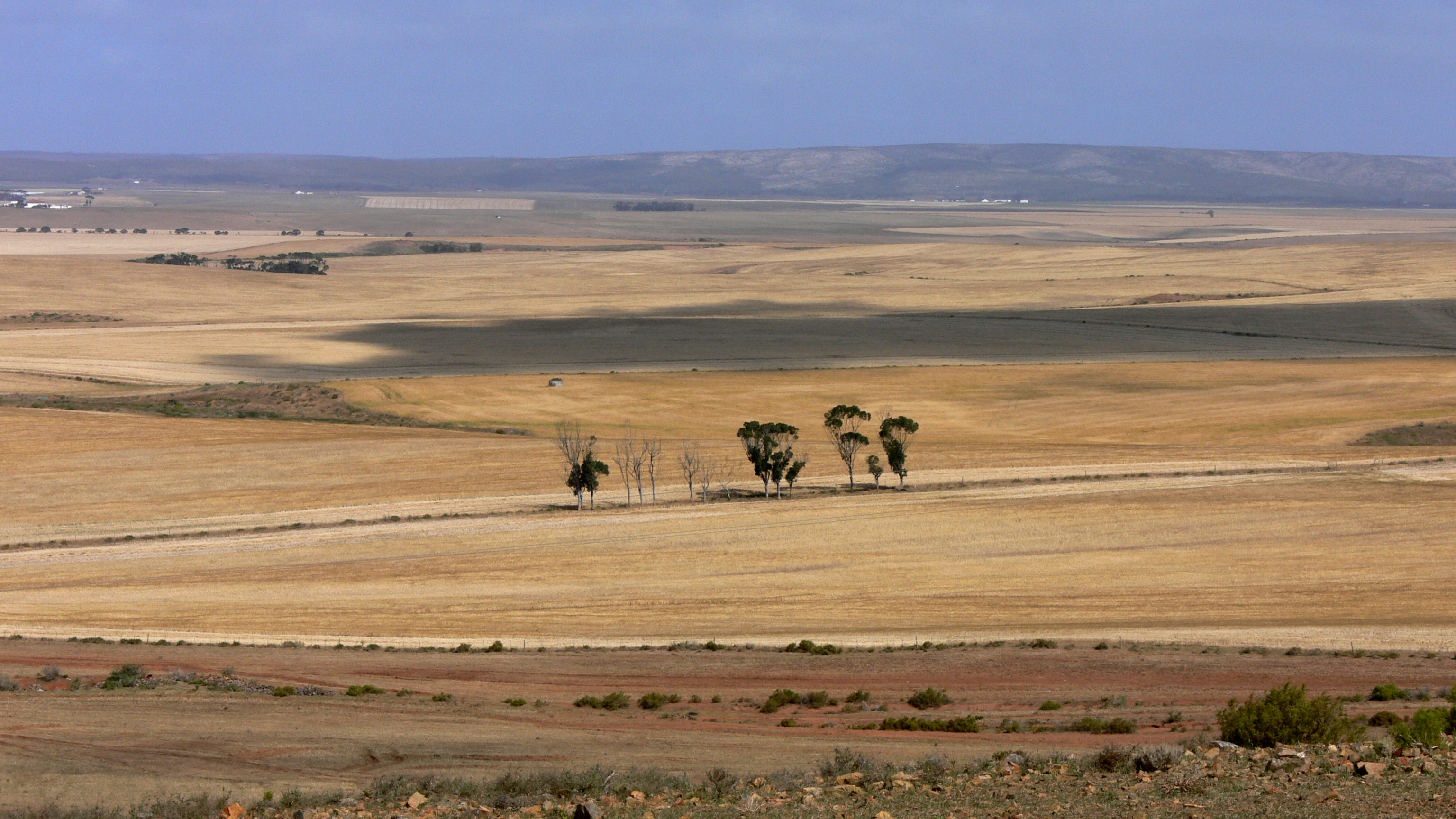

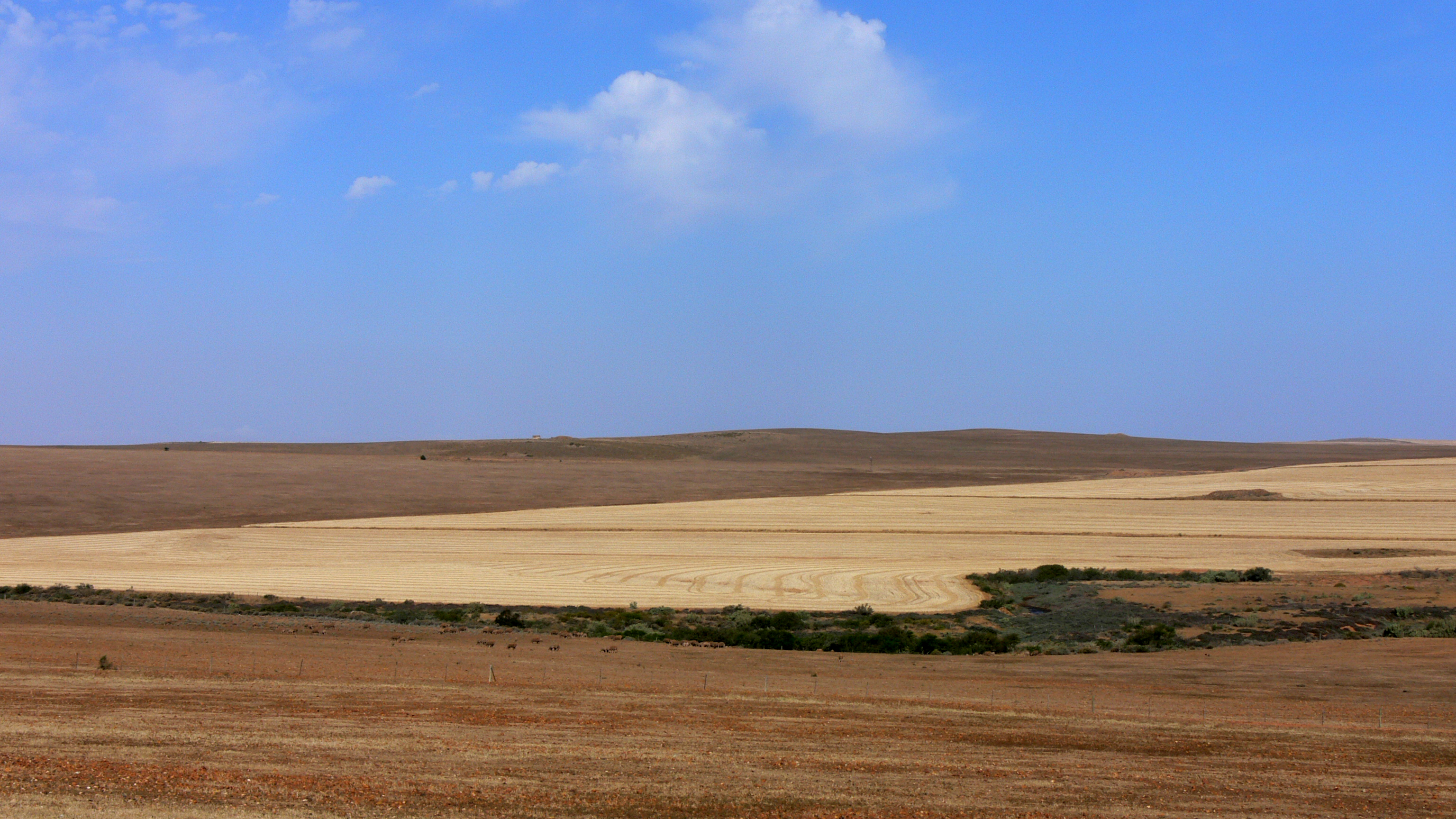

== See also ==
- Swellendam – Town in Western Cape, South Africa, once the capital of the Overberg.
- Struisbaai – Coastal town in Western Cape, South Africa
- Overberg District Municipality
- Overstrand Local Municipality
- Denel Overberg Test Range – Weapons systems testing facility on the south coast of South Africa (weapons test site)
- List of towns in the Overberg
