= Caledon, South Africa =

Caledon
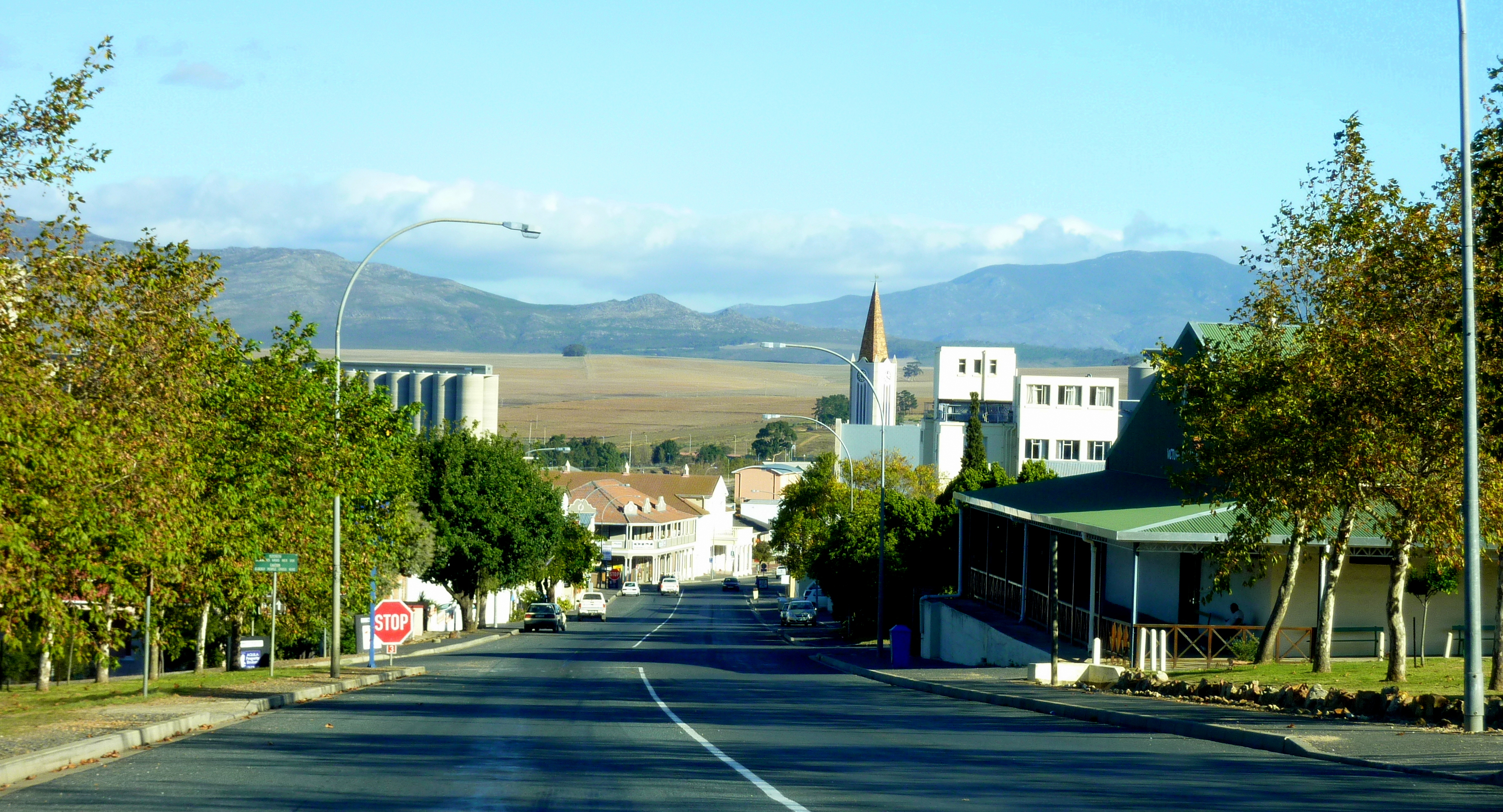
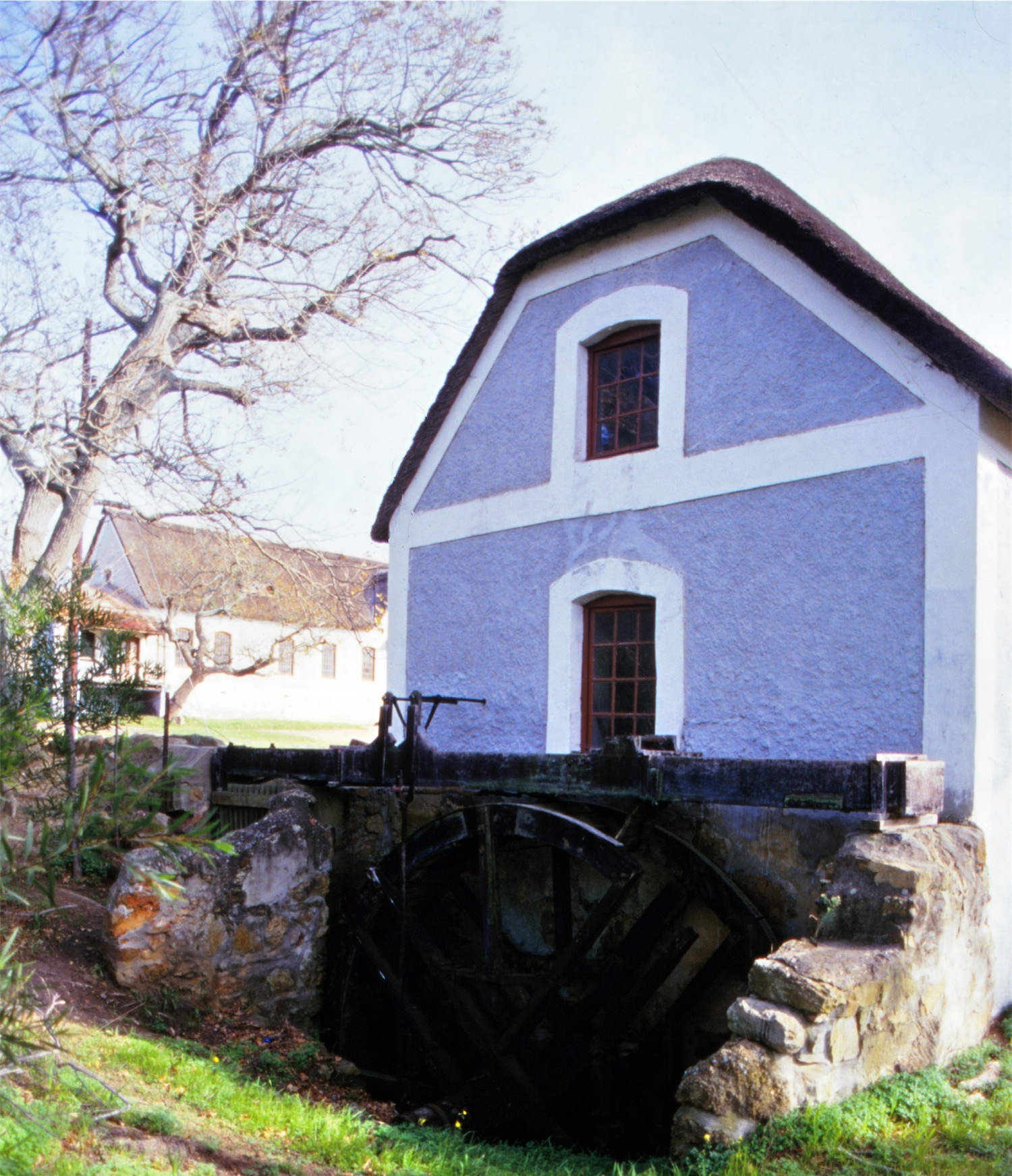
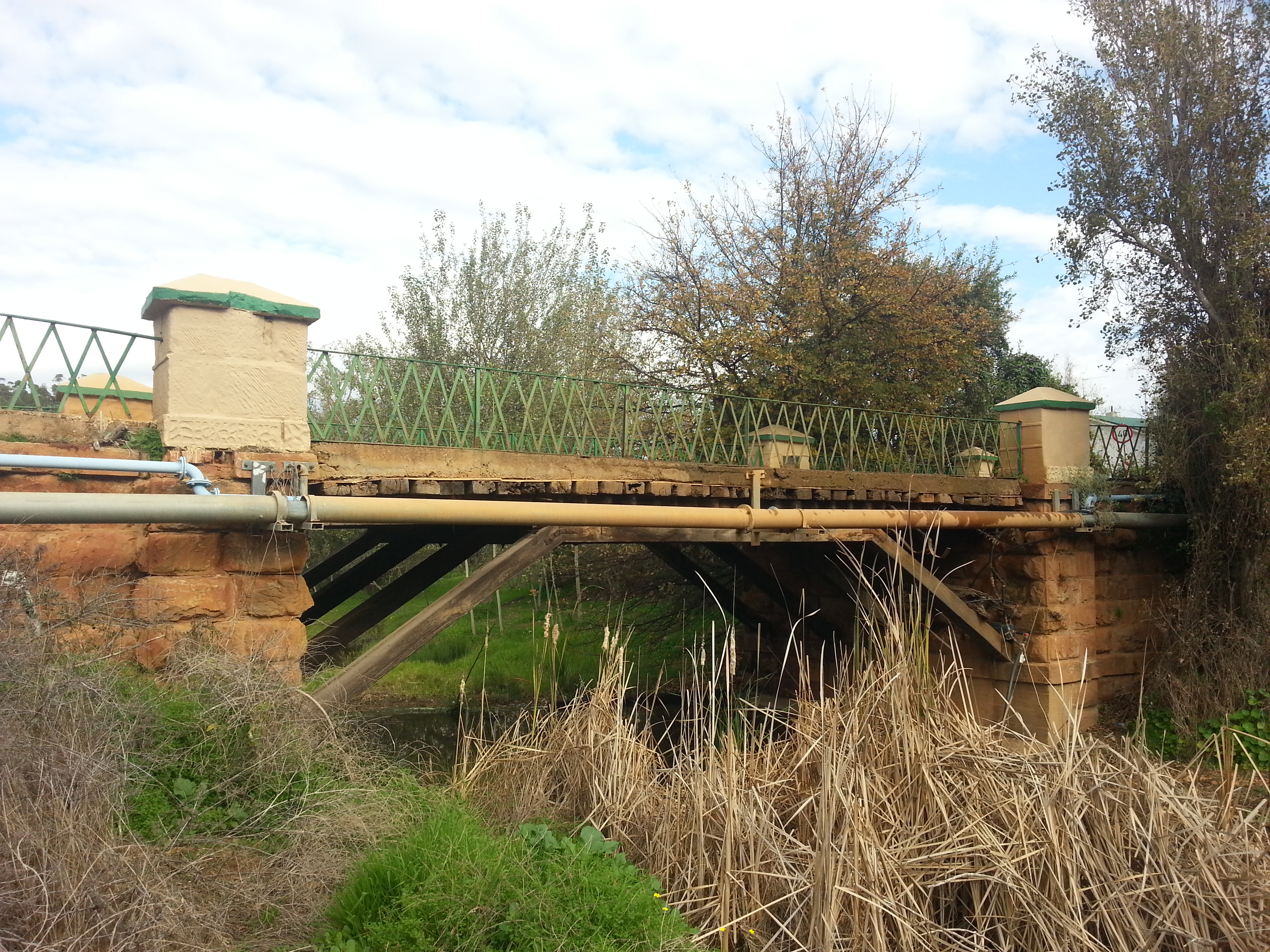
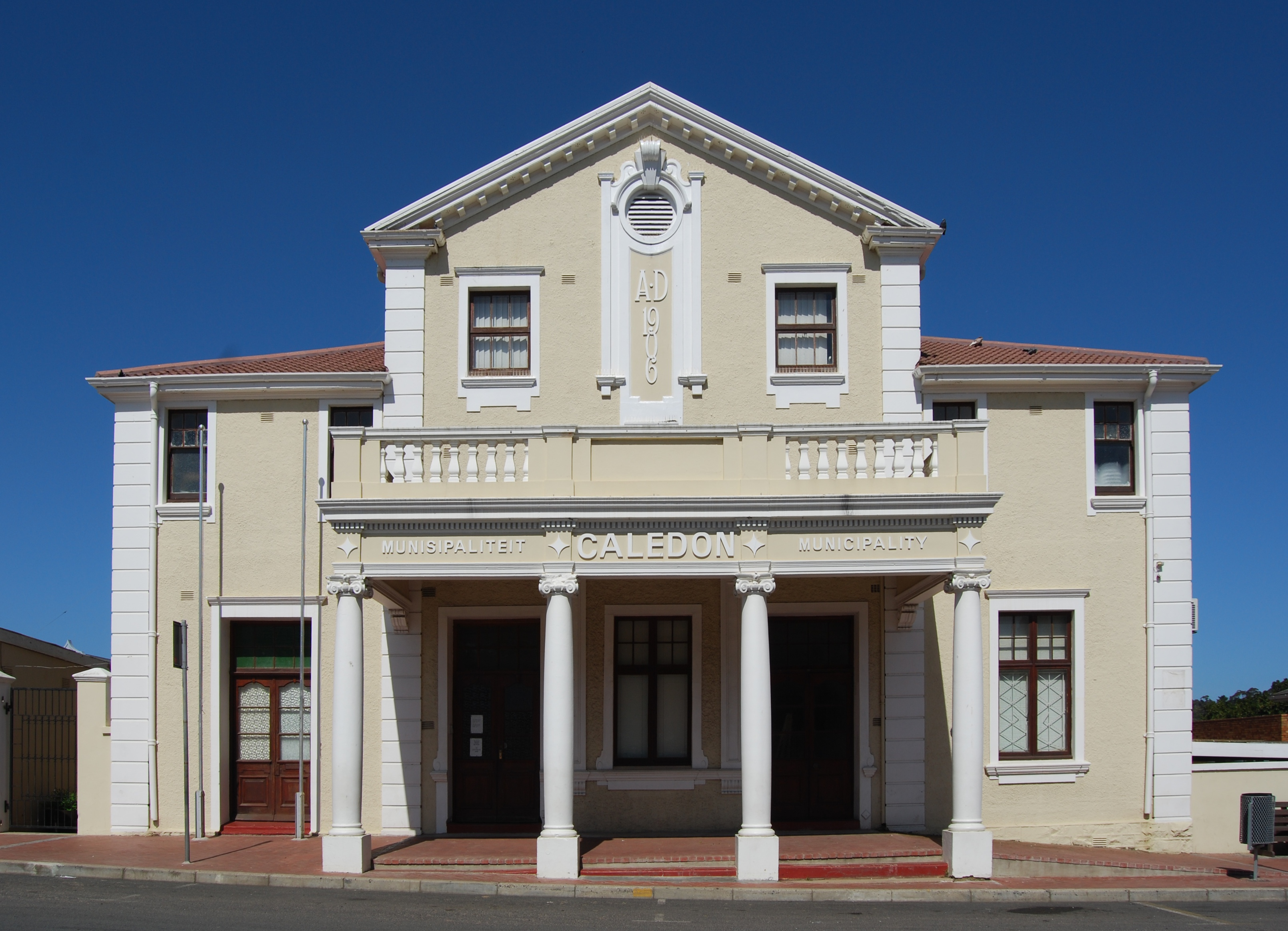
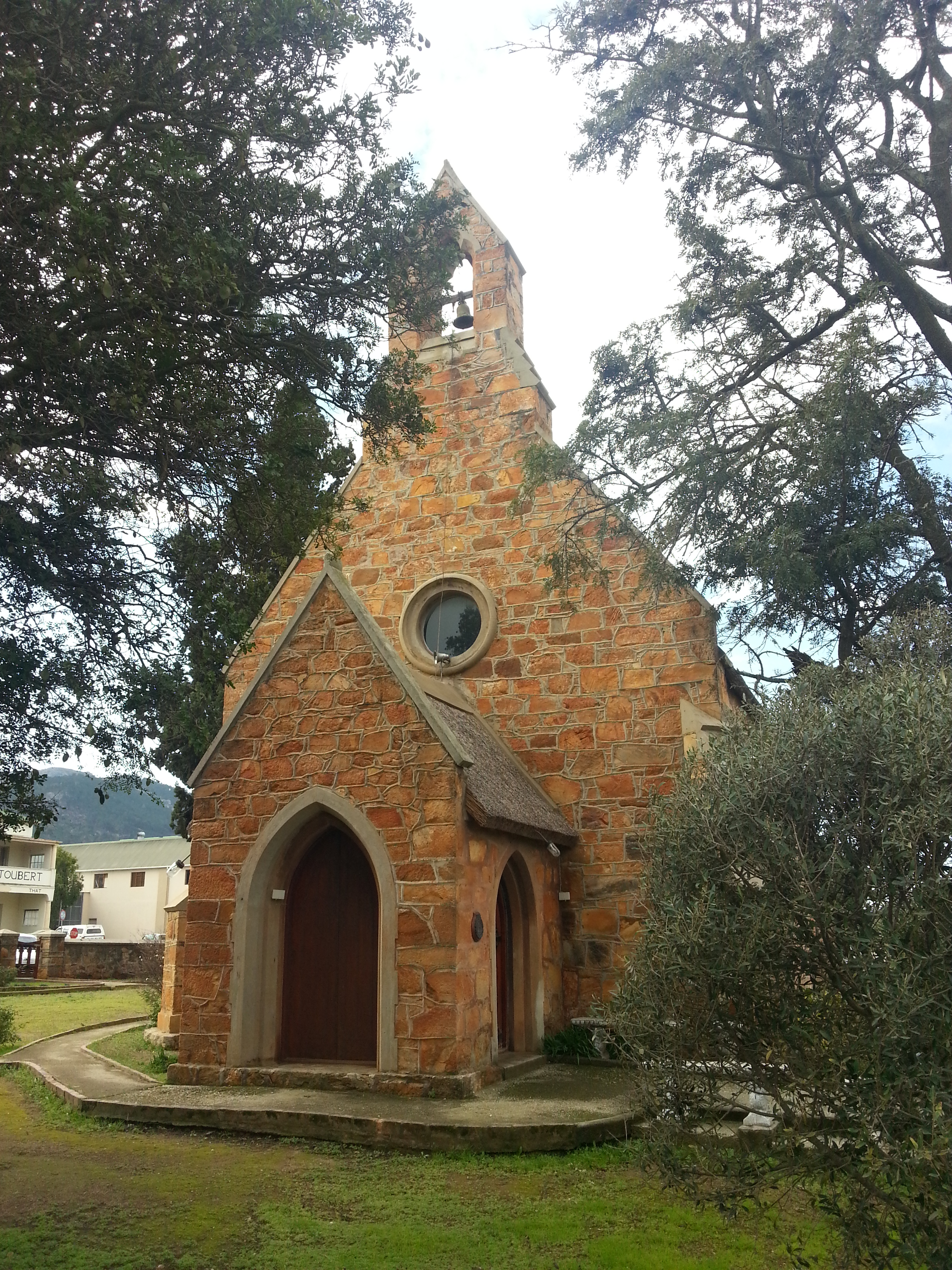
- Clockwise from top: Street in Caledon, Bath River Bridge, Holy Trinity Church, Caledon Town Hall, Elim Mill.

- Location within Western Cape Location within South Africa Location within Africa
- Coordinates: 34°13′48″S 19°25′42″E
- Country: South Africa
- Province: Western Cape
- District: Overberg
- Municipality: Theewaterskloof
- First settled: 1797
- Established: 1811
- Named for: 2nd Earl of Caledon

Government
  - Councillor: Yvonne van Tonder (DA)

Area
  - Total: 18.06 km^{2} (6.97 sq mi)

Population (2011)
  - Total: 13,020
  - Density: 720.9/km^{2} (1,867/sq mi)

Racial makeup (2011)
  - Black African: 13.7%
  - Coloured: 69.6%
  - Indian/Asian: 0.2%
  - White: 15.6%
  - Other: 0.8%

First languages (2011)
  - Afrikaans: 85.3%
  - Xhosa: 7.1%
  - English: 2.9%
  - Sotho: 2.4%
  - Other: 2.3%
- Time zone: UTC+2 (SAST)
- Postal code (street): 7230
- PO box: 7230
- Area code: 028

Caledon, originally named Swartberg, is a town in the Overberg region in the Western Cape province of South Africa, located about 100 kilometres (62 mi) east of Cape Town next to mineral-rich hot springs. As of 2011 it had a population of 13,020. It is located in, and the seat of, the Theewaterskloof Local Municipality.

The town continues to be inhabited by Khoikhoi communities who, before the arrival of colonizing forces, were the wealthiest on this land.

Caledon is situated on the N2 national route, 113 kilometres (70 mi) by road from central Cape Town. At Caledon the N2 is met by the R316 from Arniston and Bredasdorp, and the R320 from Hermanus. It is also located on the Overberg branch railway line, 141 kilometres (88 mi) by rail from Cape Town station.

The Caledon district is primarily an agricultural region. Most agricultural activities involve grain production with a certain amount of stock farming. The town is locally well known for the Caledon Spa and Casino, and for its rolling hills and yellow canola fields in spring.

== Geography ==
The town has a Mediterranean climate of warm, dry summers and cool, wet winters. Temperatures are modified by its close proximity to the South Atlantic Ocean, just over the Klein River Mountains to the south.

== History ==
The place was originally known in Dutch as Bad agter de Berg (Bath Behind the Mountain). A bath house was built in 1797 and a village called Swartberg sprang up, which was on 31 December 1813 renamed Caledon in honor of the Irish peer Du Pré Alexander, 2nd Earl of Caledon (1777–1839), the first British governor of the Cape (1806–1811).

== Notable residents ==
The writer Peter Dreyer was born in Caledon at the Caledon Baths Hotel in 1939.

Rhodesian government minister P. K. van der Byl retired to Caledon and subsequently died there, in Fairfield. His father, anti-Apartheid politician P. V. van der Byl, was born in Caledon in 1889.

== Attractions ==
- Caledon Museum, Constitution Street.
- K3 ZIPLINE - World's Longest Zipline, N2 Road, Caledon.
