= Kleinrivier Mountains =

Mountain range in South Africa

Coordinates: 34°23′S 19°25′E

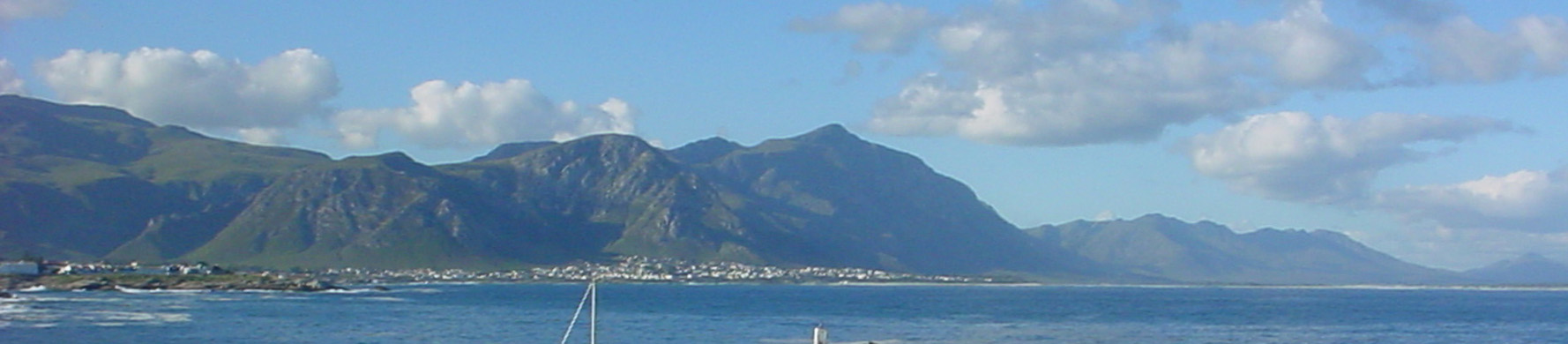
Kleinrivier Mountains from Hermanus Harbour

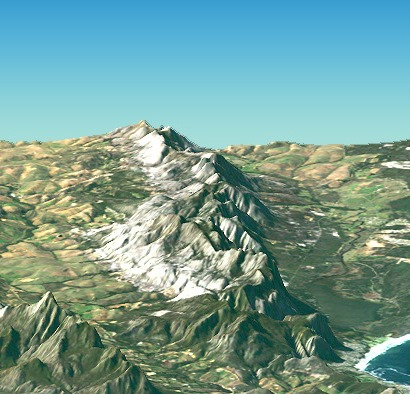
Kleinrivier Mountains

The Kleinrivier Mountains are a mountain range in the Cape Fold Belt of the Western Cape province of South Africa. Kleinrivier means "Small River" in Afrikaans and is named after the Klein River in the area that mouths out near Hermanus where the range begins in the west, then continues eastward to north-east of Stanford and terminates at Akkedisberg Pass. The highest mountain in the range is Maanskynkop (964m) (Afrikaans: Moonshine Peak) and dominates the entire Walker Bay coastline. The mountains experience a very mild Mediterranean climate, moderated by cool, moist winds blowing off the South Atlantic Ocean. Although no peaks exceed 1000m, the range is still quite imposing, as it rises very steeply from sea level. The Kleinrivier Mountains are classified as Critical Biodiversity Area 1.

North of the main range, is the higher range of the Babilonstoring Mountains (Afrikaans: Tower of Babel), which are geologically part of the range, and even though shorter, are higher, with its highest point reaching 1167m. They are more clearly visible south of Caledon and are traversed by Shaw's Mountain Pass of the R320.
