= Old Harbour Museum =

Maritime museum in Hermanus, South Africa

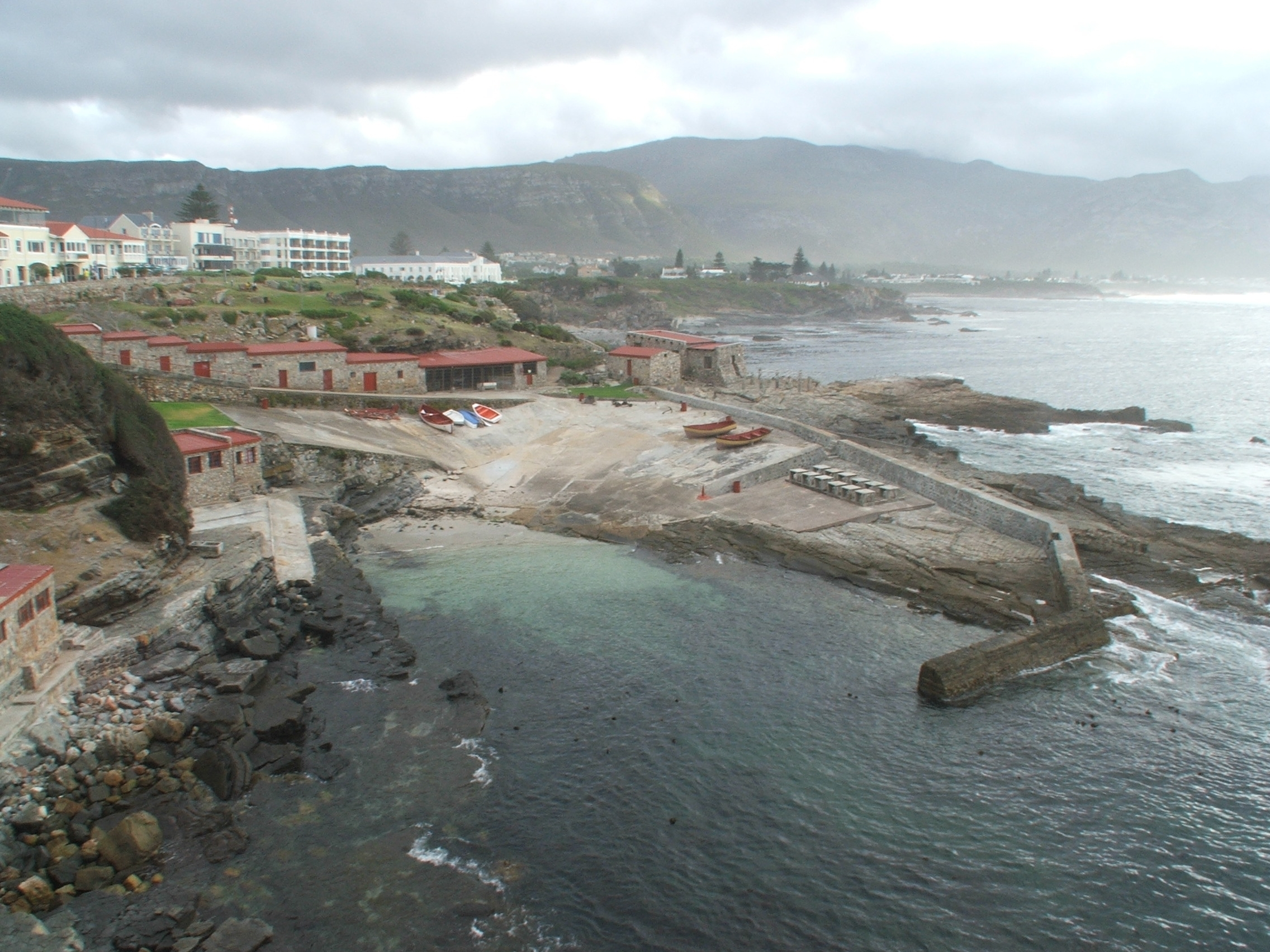
- Scenic old harbour and Walker bay, early in the morning
- Established: 13 June 1972
- Location: Marine Drive / Market Square, Hermanus (Overstrand Local Municipality), South Africa
- Coordinates: 34°25′12.87″S 19°14′34.46″E
- Collection size: approx. 2,700 objects
- Visitors: 109,119 (2011–2012)
- Website: www.old-harbour-museum.co.za

The Old Harbour Museum is a South African museum situated on the coast, in the heart of Hermanus. The town originally developed around this harbour from around the middle of the nineteenth century when plentiful fish and fresh water was found in the area. The Fishermen's Village section of the museum is situated above the old harbour across from Market Square.

== History ==
The old harbour was declared a national monument in 1970 and is presently a Provincial Heritage Site. This unique site was proclaimed a province-aided museum two years later and the board of trustees endeavoured to conserve the area and develop displays in rebuilt old fishing shacks that depict the history of fishing and marine life in Hermanus.

In 1983 the board of trustees, through fundraising by the Friends of the Old Harbour Museum, bought the Fishermen's Village in the centre of Hermanus, opposite the old harbour and reconstructed the de Wet's Sunday school house that now contains a collection of photographs of old Hermanus.

In 1998 a whale house was completed across from this museum and the first phase, 'Welcome to our whale world' exhibition in the 3 official languages of the Western Cape was installed by 2007.

These three museums are open to visitors seven days a week and the market can operate Saturdays, Sundays and public holidays, weather permitting.

== Proclamation ==
Under Section 2 and 3 of the Museum Ordinance, 1968 (Ordinance 31 of 1968), the local museum at the old harbour in Hermanus, South Africa was officially proclaimed a provincial museum on 13 June 1972 by the then 'administrator of the province of the Cape of Good Hope, Mr. A.. H. Vosloo'.

== Museum buildings and other facilities ==
=== The Old Harbour Open-Air Museum ===
This Western Cape Provincial Heritage Site (previously a South African National Monument) is one of few fishing harbours in the world that has been conserved intact. It harbours a few historic fishing boats along the slopes, indigenous veldkos in old brine tanks and re-established coastal fynbos along the cliffs.

=== Old Harbour indoor displays ===
This area houses exhibitions portraying the contrast of the history of fishing since 1855 by the poor local fishermen versus angling by the wealthy holiday makers, taking place at the same harbour. It also houses seawater tanks with inter-tidal species, endemic to the area, the historic Bill Selkirk displays, a sono booth and a museum shop.

Research has been started by Western Cape Museum Service for the transformation of these exhibits. The exhibition named 'Fishing, Poverty and Politics' will consist of two sections including the natural and cultural history of the area.

=== Hans Moore Environmental Centre and Boat Shed ===
This fish shack was rebuilt in 1995 as an environmental education centre but it was too cold and damp in winter. It now houses the boat storage shed. A section is used in public private partnership with Walker Bay Adventures doing sea kayaking trips with tourist departing from and returning to the old harbour.

=== Allengenski Complex ===
Rebuilt on the original foundations of the first buildings in the old harbour. Section one completed in 1990 houses the toilet facilities. Section two completed in 1993 houses the administrative offices of the entire museum complex.

=== SA Shark Conservancy Centre – Old Perlemoen Hatchery ===
This building was built on an area where fishing shacks previously stood. It was developed as a hatchery to accommodate the first perlemoen farming in Hermanus, started by Dr. Pierre Hugo. When the business grew too big it relocated to the new harbour.

The hatchery then housed the indoor education centre and storage area. Through environmental education the museum is linked, reached out to and included learners and visitors from the Greater Hermanus, surrounding rural areas and further a field. The South African Shark Conservancy is now housed in this building where they do shark and marine research and have further developed the education centre. In partnership with the museum various marine education programmes, camps and special events including World Oceans Day, Marine Week and Coastal Cleanup Week are hosted.

=== Walker Bay Shore Angling Club Centre – Old Perlemoen Nursery ===
These rebuild shacks were used to mature the small perlemoen to a reasonable size before they were sold to perlemoen farms. When the business relocated to the new harbour the building was still used in public private partnership with Hermanus Abalone for perlemoen displays and talks for visitors until January 2005 when they joined the business in the new harbour.

The nursery then housed the contents from the reduced storage area after the hatchery was vacated to accommodate the SA Shark Conservancy.

A section was used to store some of the décor for the annual 'Passiespele' .

In 2009 the board of trustees agreed to allow the Walker Bay Shore Angling Club Centre to temporary occupy the main room. In exchange they had to provide storage for the contents that was carefully documented and moved. They also have to present regular education sessions in the old harbour on various aspects of shore angling.

== Museum buildings and other facilities in the Fishermen's Village ==
=== De Wet's Huis Photo Museum ===
This museum houses a collection of photos depicting historical Hermanus as well as furniture from schoolmaster Paterson and fishing reels and trophies from Bill Selkirk.

The newly acquired Ravenscroft site camera and accessories is also on display. TD Ravenscroft, a retired photographer of the Cape Government Railways residing in Hermanus around 1900 and was responsible for most of the photos in the museum's collection. These were originally done on glass negatives. Ravenscroft traveled through most of the country and practically documented South Africa's towns and villages of the 1880s and 1890s, depicting most of the striking buildings and bridges of the day. A lot of his scenic photos, mostly of the Boland and Western Cape areas, decorated the train compartments.

=== The Whale House ===
==== History ====
By the early 1990s whale(s) became a chosen tourist attraction. In 1991, board member & chairman of the Friends, Jose Burman, proposed a whale museum for the community of the Greater Hermanus on an open section of the Fishermen's Village. Architect Pat Riley designed the Whale House as her contribution to the museum and plans were ready by the beginning of 1994: A whale museum to inform and educate the many local visitors to the Greater Hermanus and learners as well as national and international tourists, who view the beautiful whales in Walker Bay. This museum is entirely dedicated to whale exhibits, especially the southern right, and anything pertaining to cetaceans.

This concept was taken to community meetings and met with great enthusiasm. Because of the importance of the heritage of the beautiful whales, such a museum would play a vital role in establishing ownership of one of their greatest tourist attractions especially among the previously marginalised communities of the Greater Hermanus.

The Whale House was built in 3 sections: (1) Lecture Room (1995); (2) Whale House foundation, shop, office & toilets (1996); (3)Main Hall (1998) that consists of an exhibition hall especially designed to house a suspended whale skeleton and whale exhibition. In the interim it was used for temporary art exhibitions until a suitable whale skeleton was found.

The board of trustees approached Museum Service (part of the Western Province Department of Cultural Affairs and Sport in Cape Town, South Africa) to assist the museum with the research and displays for the Whale House museum – (This was the first phase of a Transformation Projects of the Old Harbour museum).

==== Finding the "right" skeleton ====
After many unsuccessful attempts the search for a suitable skeleton ended in July 2003. A young female Southern Right whale, that had died at sea, washed up on the rocks at Onrus River, just to the west of Hermanus. She was exactly the right size for the exhibition space. With assistance from the Overstrand Municipality and Hermanus Coast Care, the bones were carefully removed by specialist whale taxidermist Piet Pretorius and taken to Cape Town for cleaning and preparation. This took place during the school holidays and generated a lot of interest from the many visitors. A few parents also had to keep inquisitive children away from touching the smelly bones.

As this washed-up whale was in an advanced state of decomposition, some of the bones came loose. A few were retrieved by divers but others were lost. These bones had to be moulded and reconstructed by the Taxidermist with a bone-like substance, which was a very costly affair. The other bones were cleaned and treated in huge containers filled with water and enzymes. This process took about two years to rid the bones of excess oil so that no major oil seepage will occur after the skeleton is hung.

After three and a half years, these bones were then cleaned, prepared and assembled by the taxidermist and are now hanging in the Whale House.

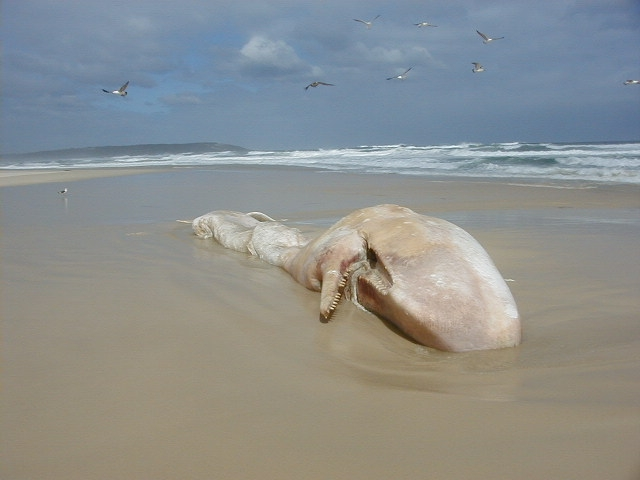
Juvenile Sperm whale washed up on Hawston beach on 18 February 2006

During this waiting period, the intact skull of a young Sperm whale was found on Hawston beach. The taxidermist reconstructed a few of the missing teeth and it is now displayed in a suspended position in the entrance of the Whale House.

==== Exhibitions ====
In 1998 negotiations were initiated with the Scientific and Technical Divisions of Museum Service, Western Cape Department of Cultural Affairs, Cape Town, for the research and to compile a world-class exhibition on cetaceans.

After years of research and collecting of artifacts and information, most of the research was completed by Museums Scientific Services in 2006. Museum Technical Services continued with the construction of the new Whale House displays for "Welcome to our Whales". Because of the extended research, time constraints and the nature of the designs that were developed, the services of private contractors with suitable equipment was co-opted to ensure that the exhibition is of international standard and something the community of the Greater Hermanus will be proud of.

The first phase of the whale exhibition was installed by the December holidays of 2007 and was well received by the public. The accompanied text was in the three official languages of the Province of the Western Cape – Afrikaans, Xhosa and English. The official opening of this phase by the HOD of the Western Cape Department of Cultural Affairs & Sport, Mr. Brent Walters, accompanied by the Overstrand Mayor, Mr. Theo Beyleveldt, was on 17 May 2010.

The second exhibition phase, "Whales in Art & Culture" has now been researched by Museum Service and the designing of these displays are also completed. When funding becomes available, this section will also be completed.

=== Lecture Room ===
Since July 2007 The Whale Show, a CD on whales and whale behaviour, compiled by nature artist Noel Ashton and sponsored by International Fund for Animal Welfare (IFAW) is viewed here twice daily at 10:00 and 15:00 and at other times to pre-booked groups.

== Functioning of the museum ==
Because the Old Harbour Museum is a province-aided museum, it receives an annual operational subsidy from the Provincial Western Cape Department of Cultural Affairs & Sport. Three members of staff are also employed by the department. Ten other staff members are full-time and four part-time employees of the Board of Trustees of the Old Harbour Museum. This ensures that the three museums can be open to visitors seven days a week and the craft market can operate Saturdays, Sundays and public holidays.

The largest part of the funding of the trustee appointed staff, maintenance projects and further operational costs is derived from the income from the 5 shops in the 4 historic buildings on the Fishermen's Village.

== The Friends of the Old Harbour Museum ==
The Friends of the Old Harbour Museum was formed to generate and administer extra funds to benefit the museum. Without these extra funds the museum would not have being able to achieve what it has to date. The Friends are steered by a Committee to regulate these funds and assist the museum with these projects they support.

== See also ==
- Hermanus
