= De Kelders =

De Kelders Die Kelders
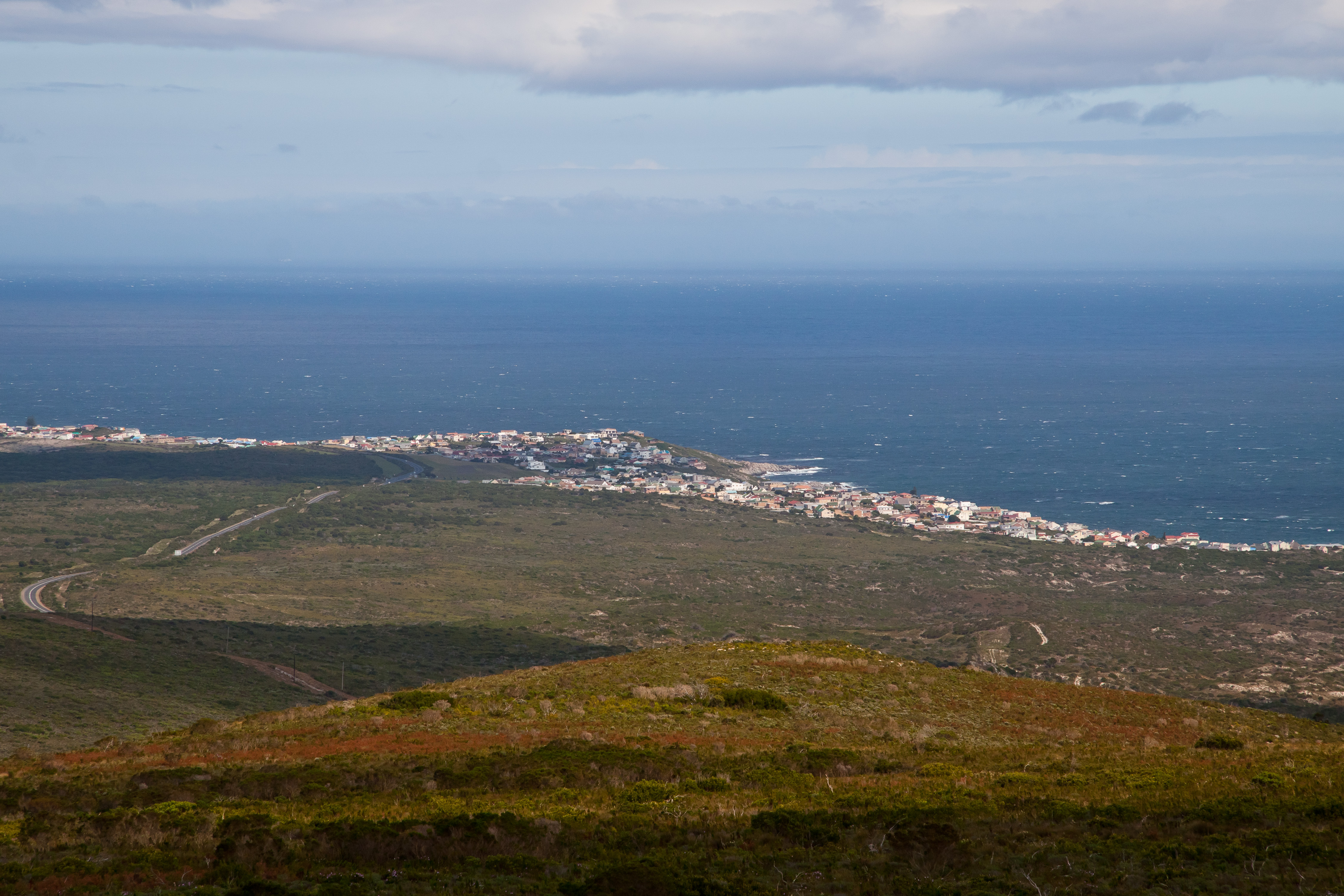

- Location within Western Cape Location within South Africa
- Coordinates: 34°34′S 19°21′E
- Country: South Africa
- Province: Western Cape
- District: Overberg
- Municipality: Overstrand

Area
  - Total: 2.23 km^{2} (0.86 sq mi)

Population (2011)
  - Total: 1,070
  - Density: 480/km^{2} (1,240/sq mi)

Racial makeup (2011)
  - African: 2.0%
  - Coloured: 2.2%
  - Indian/Asian: 0.1%
  - White: 95.5%
  - Other: 0.3%

First languages (2011)
  - Afrikaans: 84.4%
  - English: 12.6%
  - Other: 3.0%
- Time zone: UTC+2 (SAST)
- Postal code (street): 7220
- PO box: 7220
- Area code: 028

De Kelders (or Afrikaans: Die Kelders, lit. 'cellars') is a coastal village in the Overberg District Municipality, Western Cape, South Africa.

== Die Kelders Caves ==
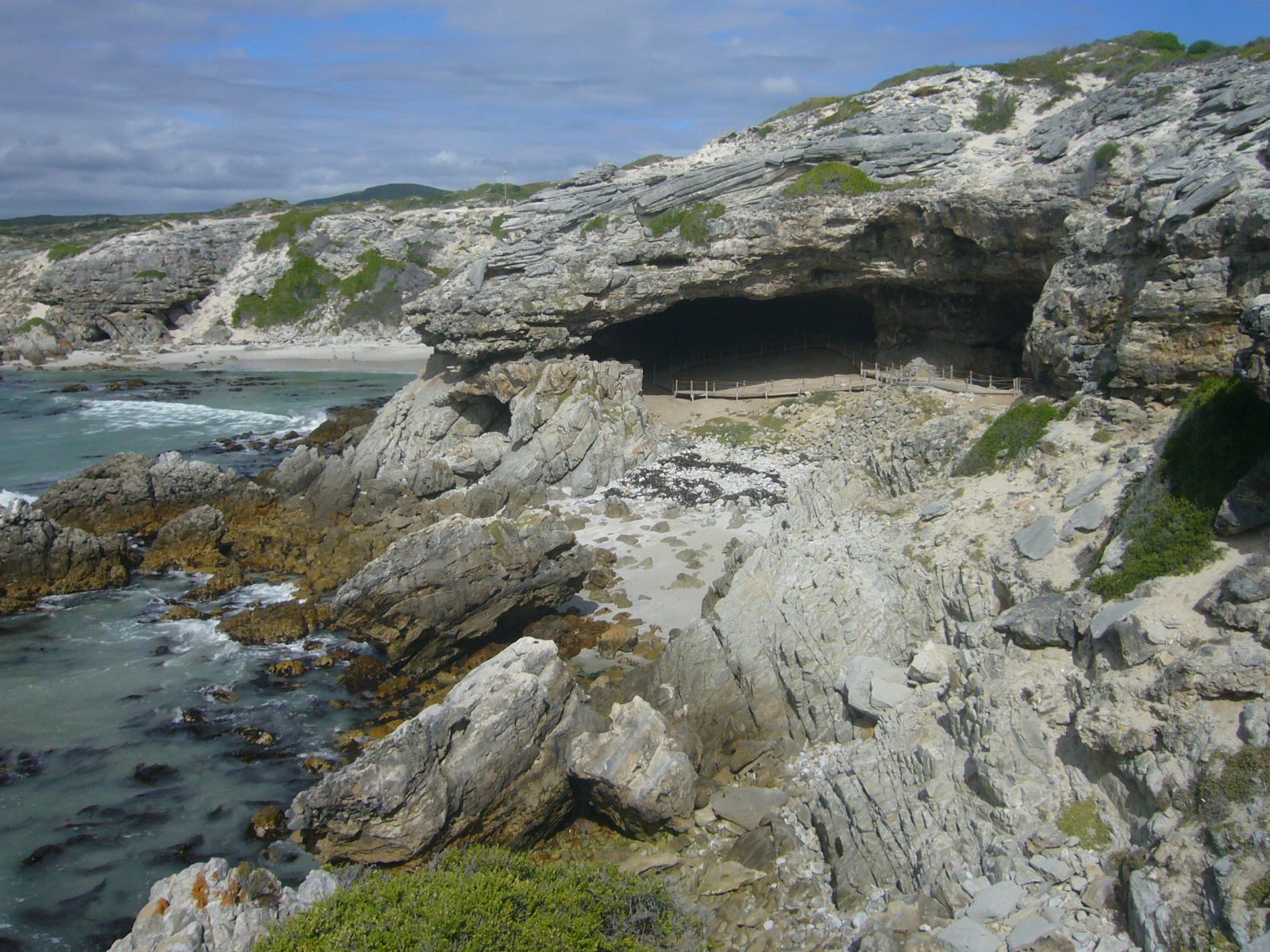
Die Kelders Caves

Die Kelders Caves are an archaeological site that is relevant to human evolution. The site consists of two caves that contain human remains dating to the Middle Stone Age. The remains include isolated teeth, two manual phalanges, one pollical phalanx (of the thumb), and a mandible. The assemblage contains at least 10 (mostly) subadult individuals. The morphology of some of these bones are similar to other Middle Stone Age sites across Africa, including Klasies River Caves, Equus Caves, and Witkrans.

Its name is Afrikaans for 'the cellars', derived from the coastal caves in sandstone cliffs.

== Activities ==
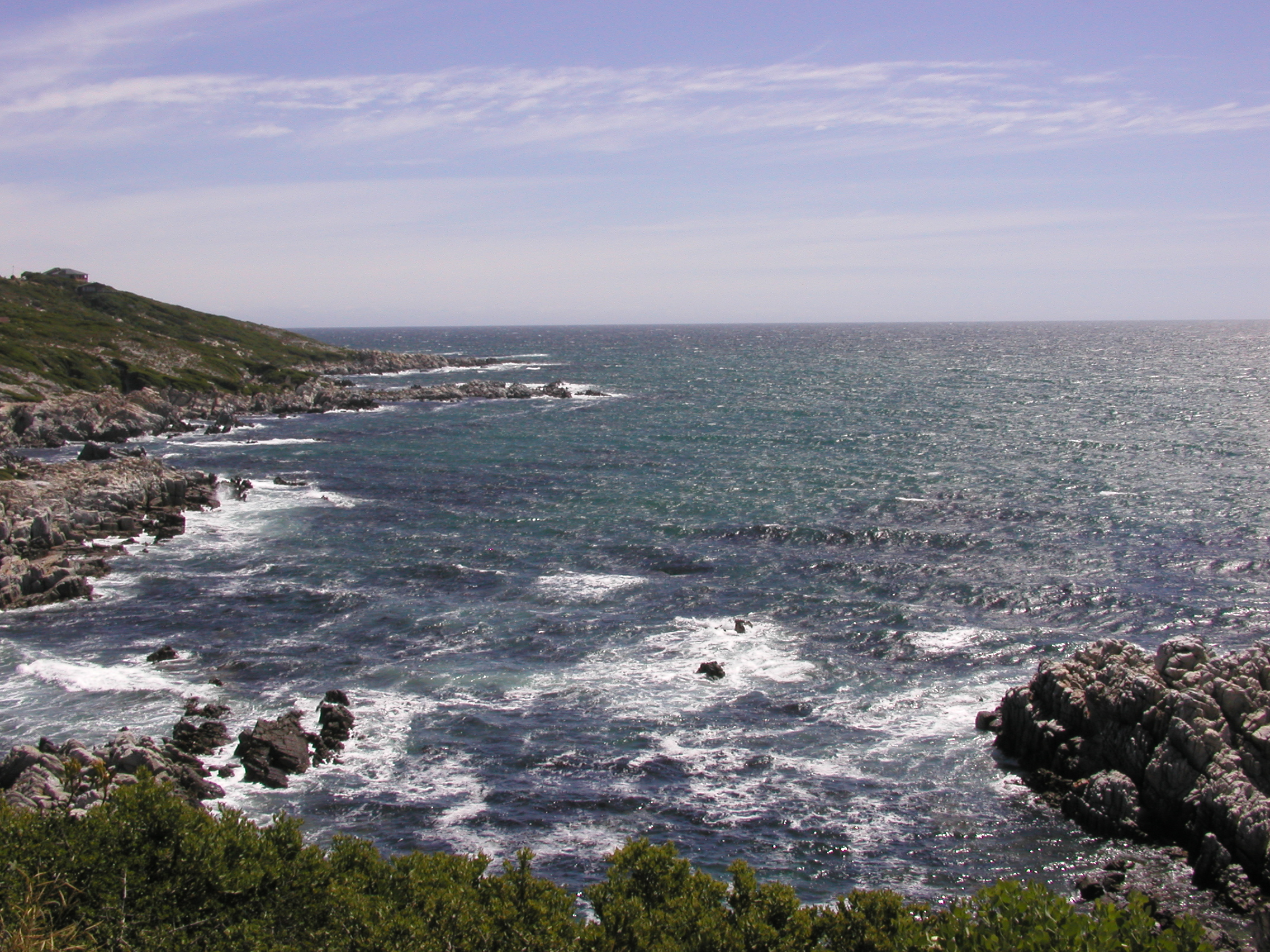
View of Walker Bay from De Kelders

The village itself is a holiday resort 19 km south-west of Stanford, between Gansbaai and Hermanus. It lies on the shore of Walker Bay, adjacent to Walker Bay Nature Reserve and Walker Bay Whale Sanctuary. De Kelders is also an excellent whale watching location; Southern right whales use Walker Bay to calve and mate.
