= Hawston =

- Location within Western Cape Location within South Africa Location within Africa
- Coordinates: 34°23′S 19°08′E
- Country: South Africa
- Province: Western Cape
- District: Overberg
- Municipality: Overstrand

Area
  - Total: 4.65 km^{2} (1.80 sq mi)

Population (2011)
  - Total: 8,214
  - Density: 1,770/km^{2} (4,580/sq mi)

Racial makeup (2011)
  - Black African: 1.2%
  - Coloured: 96.0%
  - Indian/Asian: 0.2%
  - White: 0.4%
  - Other: 2.3%

First languages (2011)
  - Afrikaans: 95.3%
  - English: 3.5%
  - Other: 1.2%
- Time zone: UTC+2 (SAST)
- Postal code (street): 7202
- PO box: 7202
- Area code: 021

Hawston is a village in the Western Cape, South Africa, It is a fishing village north-east of Mudge Point, 5 km north-west of Onrusrivier and 11 km from Hermanus. It is named after C.R. Haw, a civil commissioner of Caledon.

Located in the Overstrand Local Municipality, about an hour from Cape Town, it is located between Fisherhaven and Vermont, Western Cape, and is close to Hermanus.
