= Sandbaai =

- Location within Western Cape Location within South Africa
- Coordinates: 34.419°S 19.194°E
- Country: South Africa
- Province: Western Cape
- District: Overberg
- Municipality: Overstrand

Area
  - Total: 4.19 km^{2} (1.62 sq mi)

Population (2011)
  - Total: 4,102
  - Density: 979/km^{2} (2,540/sq mi)

Racial makeup (2011)
  - Black African: 5.8%
  - Coloured: 4.2%
  - Indian/Asian: 0.3%
  - White: 89.0%
  - Other: 0.8%

First languages (2011)
  - Afrikaans: 68.9%
  - English: 28.6%
  - Other: 2.5%
- Time zone: UTC+2 (SAST)
- Postal code (street): 7200
- PO box: 7200

Sandbaai (or Sand Bay) is a seaside town of approximately 4,000 people on the south coast of the Western Cape province in South Africa. Sandbaai lies between Onrusrivier to the west and Hermanus to the east. Sandbaai is governed as ward 7 of the Overstrand Local Municipality.

According to the 2011 census, the population of Sandbaai is 4,102, of whom 68.9% spoke Afrikaans as their first language while 28.6% spoke English. 89.0% of the population described themselves as "White", 5.8% as "Black African" and 4.2% as "Coloured".

== Gallery ==
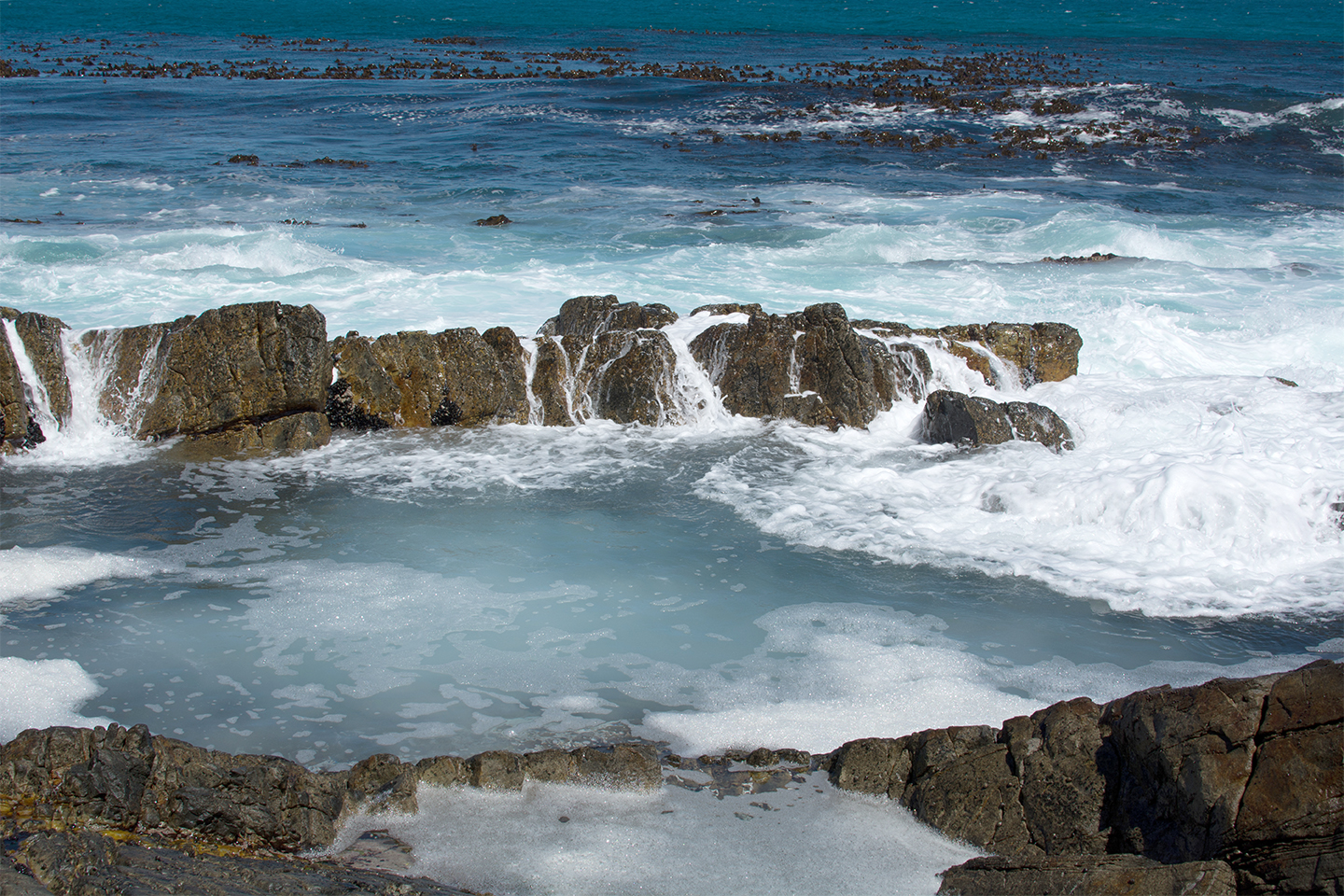
Sandbaai Seaside

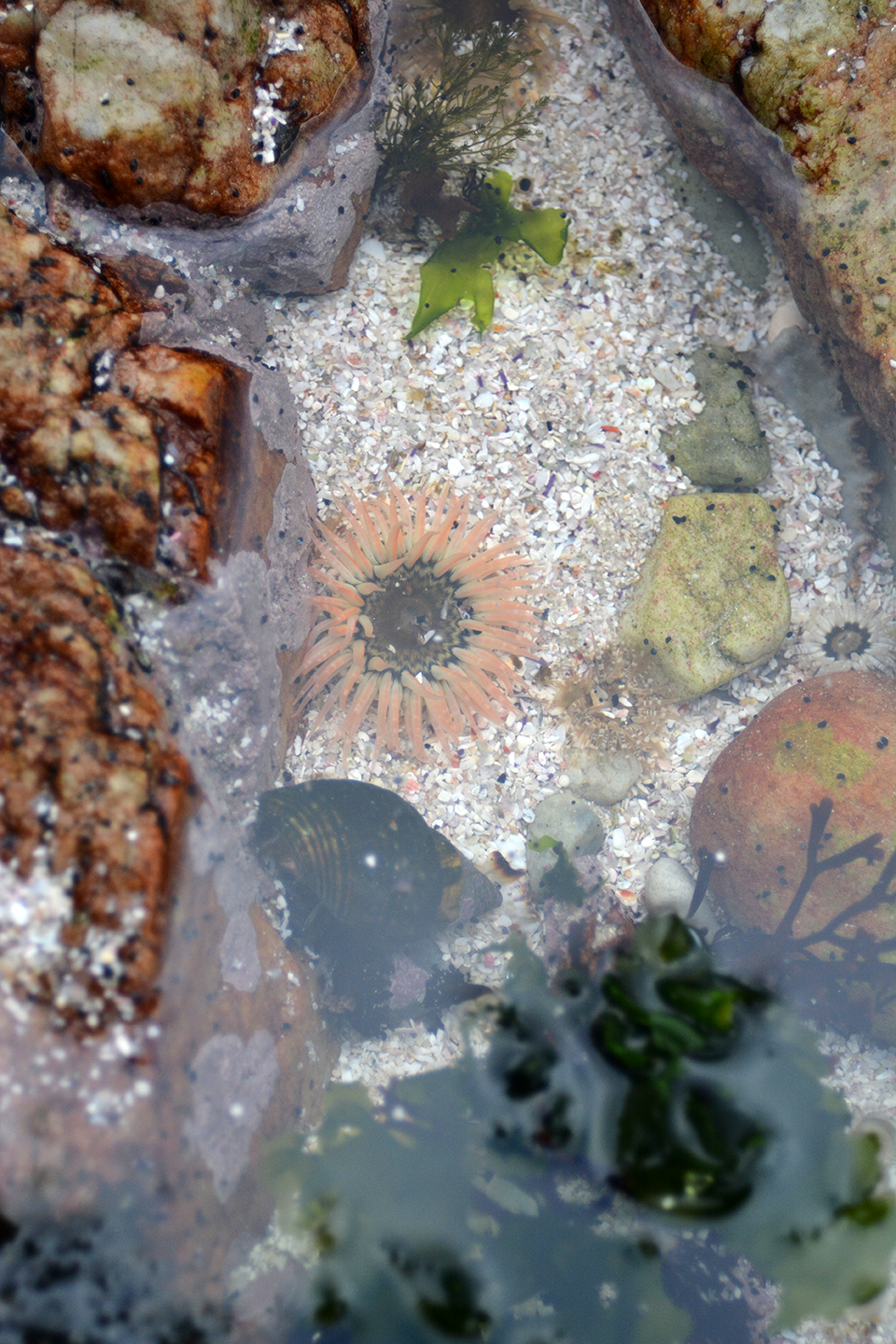
Sandbaai Tidal Pool

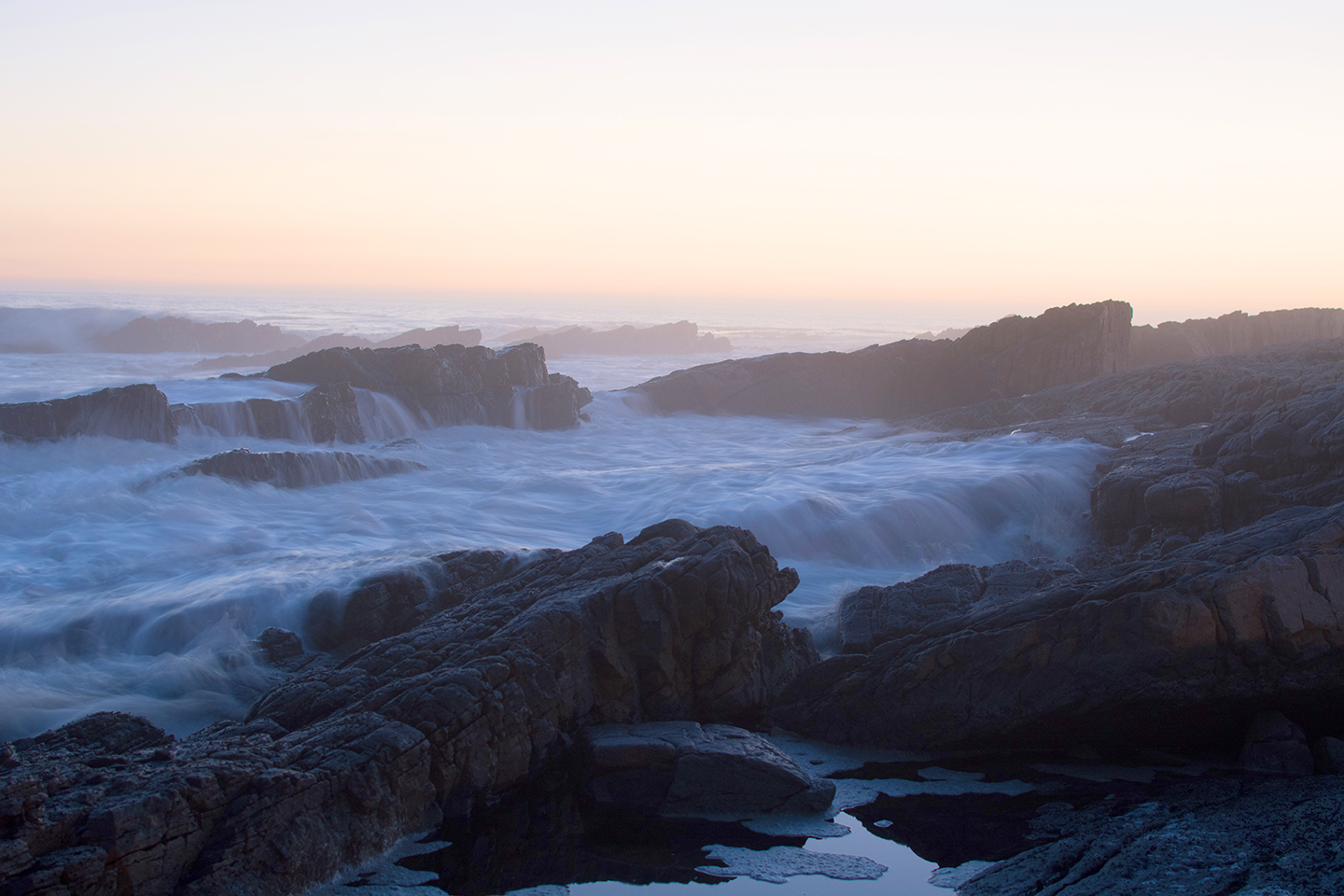
Sandbaai Seaside Sunset
