= Franskraalstrand =

- Location within Western Cape Location within South Africa
- Coordinates: 34°36′36″S 19°23′15″E
- Country: South Africa
- Province: Western Cape
- District: Overberg
- Municipality: Overstrand

Area
  - Total: 2.50 km^{2} (0.97 sq mi)

Population (2011)
  - Total: 1,165
  - Density: 466/km^{2} (1,210/sq mi)

Racial makeup (2011)
  - Black African: 3.2%
  - Coloured: 1.7%
  - Indian/Asian: 0.1%
  - White: 94.9%
  - Other: 0.2%

First languages (2011)
  - Afrikaans: 88.2%
  - English: 10.2%
  - Xhosa: 1.3%
  - Other: 0.3%
- Time zone: UTC+2 (SAST)
- Postal code (street): 7220
- Area code: 028

Franskraalstrand, also known as Franskraal, is a coastal village near to Gansbaai in the Western Cape province of South Africa. As of 2011 it had a population of 1,165 people in 592 households.

Franskraalstrand is situated on the southern coast of the Danger Point peninsula, about 5 kilometres (3 mi) to the southeast of Gansbaai. It lies between the neighbouring village of Van Dyksbaai to the west and the mouth of the Uilkraal River to the east. The R43 highway passes along the northern edge of the village.

Franskraalstrand falls within the Overstrand Local Municipality, which is part of the Overberg District Municipality.

According to the 2011 census, of the population of 1,165 people, 95% described themselves as White, 1.7% as Coloured, and 3% as Black African. 88% of the population spoke Afrikaans as first language and 10% spoke English.

The Strandveld Museum in the village contains artefacts of HMS Birkenhead, which was wrecked in 1852 off Danger Point. The Uilenkraalsmond Resort, located at the eastern end of the village, provides camping and caravan facilities. The resort is situated next to the Uilkraal River, beyond which lies the Uilkraalsmond section of the Walker Bay Nature Reserve. A sandy beach stretches from the resort past the lagoon at the river mouth into the nature reserve.
