= Land Party (South Africa) =

Political party in South Africa

- Leader: Gcobani Ndzongana
- Secretary: Nomasigcobe Siqhaza
- Spokesperson: Avela Sithonga
- Founded: January 14, 2019
- Headquarters: Hermanus
- Ideology: Collectivism; Environmentalism; Agrarianism; Land redistribution
- Colours

Website
- www.landpartysa.co.za

The Land Party is a South African political party that advocates for policies inspired by policy decisions used in economic development of the People's Republic of China. The party advocates collective farming and environmental awareness. The party grew out of land access and housing protests in Zwelihle, Hermanus in 2018.

The Land Party plans to amend the Constitution to strengthen property rights, and transfer state-owned land to the poor. They also plan to abolish all taxes on capital, such as capital gains tax, transfer duties, estate duties, as well as decrease corporate taxes, abolish exemptions on VAT and increase personal tax. They plan to abolish the minimum wage, the unemployment insurance fund, and all forms of black-economic empowerment.

The party contested the 2019 South African general election, failing to win any seats.

In April 2019 the party threatened wide scale protest action if former King Buyelekhaya Dalindyebo was not released from prison. Dalindyebo was convicted of committing "arson, assault, kidnapping and defeating the ends of justice."

In a December 2020 by-election in the Overstrand Local Municipality, the Land Party won a seat from the African National Congress

== Election results ==
=== National elections ===
Election	Total votes	Share of vote	Seats	+/–	Government
2019	7,074	0.04%	0 / 400	–	extraparliamentary

=== Provincial elections ===
Election	Eastern Cape		Free State		Gauteng		Kwazulu-Natal		Limpopo		Mpumalanga		North-West		Northern Cape		Western Cape	
Election	%	Seats	%	Seats	%	Seats	%	Seats	%	Seats	%	Seats	%	Seats	%	Seats	%	Seats
2019					0.01%	0/73			0.02%	0/49							0.29%	0/42
2024																	0.09%	0/42
