= Kleinbaai =

- Location within Western Cape Location within South Africa
- Coordinates: 34°37′S 19°21′E
- Country: South Africa
- Province: Western Cape
- District: Overberg
- Municipality: Overstrand

Area
  - Total: 0.88 km^{2} (0.34 sq mi)

Population (2001)
  - Total: 215
  - Density: 240/km^{2} (630/sq mi)

Racial makeup (2001)
  - Coloured: 1.4%
  - White: 98.6%

First languages (2001)
  - Afrikaans: 83.3%
  - English: 15.3%
  - Southern Ndebele: 1.4%
- Time zone: UTC+2 (SAST)
- Postal code (street): 7220

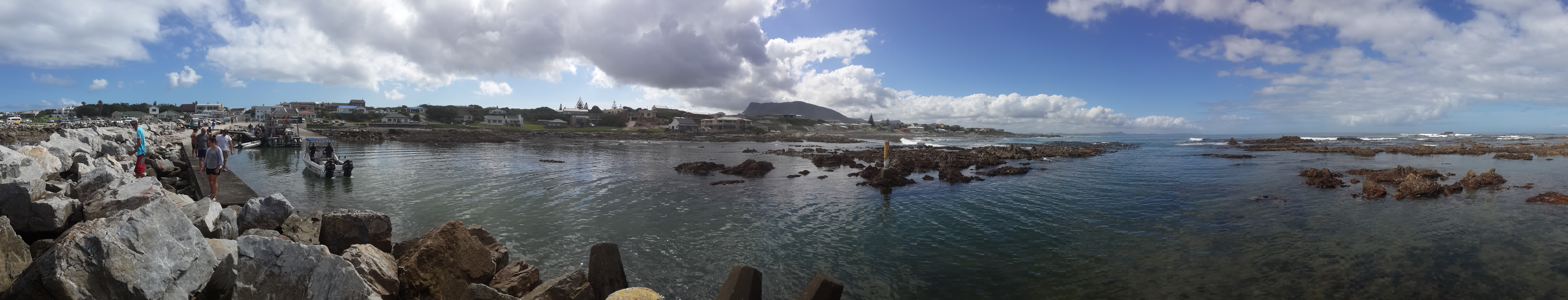
Harbour entrance of Keinbaai

Kleinbaai is a settlement in Overberg District Municipality in the Western Cape province of South Africa.

Kleinbaai is located on the Danger Point Peninsula, 6 km from Gansbaai. A gravel road connects Kleinbaai to the Danger Point Lighthouse. This area is also well known for its whale-watching sites.
