= Vermont, South Africa =

Vermont
- Location within Western Cape Location within South Africa
- Coordinates: 34°25′06″S 19°09′10″E
- Country: South Africa
- Province: Western Cape
- District: Overberg
- Municipality: Overstrand
- Main Place: Onrusrivier

Area
  - Total: 4.06 km^{2} (1.57 sq mi)

Population (2011)
  - Total: 1,992
  - Density: 491/km^{2} (1,270/sq mi)

Racial makeup (2011)
  - Black African: 5.2%
  - Coloured: 3.7%
  - Indian/Asian: 0.1%
  - White: 90.6%
  - Other: 0.5%

First languages (2011)
  - Afrikaans: 66.7%
  - English: 31.7%
  - Other: 1.7%
- Time zone: UTC+2 (SAST)
- Postal code (street): 7201

Vermont is a seaside town in the Western Cape province of South Africa. Located near Cape Town, the town adjoins the settlement of Onrusrivier and is also close to the town of Hermanus. Vermont is nestled between the mountains and the ocean, and has abundant birdlife. There is a salt pan which fills after rains, and is frequented by flamingos. There is also a rock pool, green areas and coastal pathway in Vermont.

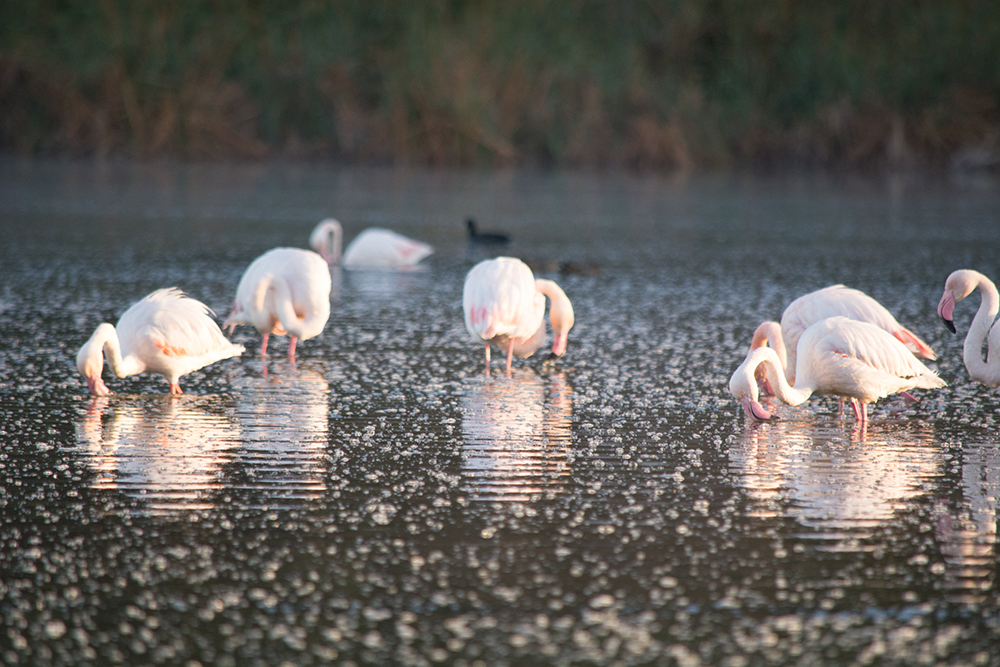
Flamingoes feeding in the Vermont Soutpan.

== Demographics (2011) ==
- Area: 2.06 km^{2}
- Population: 1,992 (491/km^{2})
- Households: 866 (213/km^{2})

Gender	Population	Percentage
Female	1,029	51.66
Male	963	48.34

Race	Population	Percentage
White	1,805	90.6
Black	103	5.2
Coloured	74	3.7

First language	Population	Percentage
Afrikaans	1,321	66.6
English	627	31.6
Other	44	1.8
