= Erica lageniformis =

Scientific classification
- Kingdom: Plantae
- Clade: Tracheophytes
- Clade: Angiosperms
- Clade: Eudicots
- Clade: Asterids
- Order: Ericales
- Family: Ericaceae
- Genus: Erica
- Species: E. lageniformis

Binomial name
- Erica lageniformis Salisb.

Synonyms
- Ericoides laevigatum (Bartl.) Kuntze

Species of flowering plant

Erica lageniformis is a plant belonging to the genus Erica and is part of the fynbos. The plant is a species endemic to the mountains at Onrus. There is only one population of 250 plants and the habitat is threatened by invasive plants such as the hakea and pinus species.
