= John Kumleben =

South African cricketer

Personal information
- Full name: John Michael Kumleben
- Born: 26 May 1933; Bloemfontein, Orange Free State, South Africa
- Died: 21 June 2014 (aged 81); Hermanus, Western Cape, South Africa
- Batting: Right-handed

Domestic team information
- Years: Team
- 1956 to 1957: Oxford University
- 1957–58 to 1960–61: Orange Free State

Career statistics
Competition	First-class
Matches	29
Runs scored	955
Batting average	19.89
100s/50s	1/4
Top score	100
Balls bowled	–
Wickets	–
Bowling average	–
5 wickets in innings	–
10 wickets in match	–
Best bowling	–
Catches/stumpings	16/–
- Source: Cricinfo, 19 April 2019

John Michael Kumleben (26 May 1933 – 21 June 2014) was a South African cricketer who played first-class cricket for Oxford University and Orange Free State between 1956 and 1961.

John Kumleben attended Michaelhouse and the University of Cape Town before going on to University College, Oxford, where he studied law. He won a hockey blue at Oxford, but although he played several matches for the university cricket team he did not win a cricket blue. His highest score was 100, made out of a team total of 196, after Oxford followed on against Yorkshire in 1957; he and Christopher Melville added 76 in 50 minutes for the last wicket but were unable to avert an innings defeat.

Kumleben became a solicitor after he returned to South Africa in 1957. He played regularly for Orange Free State for four seasons, with a highest score of 51 against Eastern Province in 1959–60, again after a follow-on, this time successfully averting an innings defeat, but not a nine-wicket loss.
