= Julian Sleigh =

Julian Sleigh (6 October 1927 in Florence - 2 October 2013 in Cape Town) was a Christian Community priest, councillor, founding member of Camphill in South Africa and author.

== Early years ==
Julian Sleigh was born in Florence, Italy on October 6, 1927 where his father lectured at the British Institute, and was baptised in the Florence Baptistery in the Roman Catholic faith. He spent his early childhood and schooling there before the family moved to London just before the war. On completing school he studied at the London School of Economics. This was followed by two years of national service in which he was selected for officer training.

Having since his early years longed for a community of people within which to work, he sought out, then joined Camphill, Scotland before helping to found the Camphill School in Hermanus, South Africa in 1958. Peter Roth, a priest, flew to South Africa to conduct the service and inspired Sleigh in his endeavour to become a priest himself.

== The Christian Community ==
In 1963 Sleigh left Camphill to study for the priesthood in Germany and Britain, closely mentored and later accompanied in setting up the work in South Africa by Dr Alfred Heidenreich and Evelyn Francis Derry. After he was ordained in 1965, he returned to South Africa and together with Heinz Maurer, became the founding priest of the Christian Community in Southern Africa. Shortly after this, he and his family moved from Hermanus to set up the first Camphill village, Alpha, that is today the Camphill Village West Coast to the north of Cape Town. Here many of the children with Special Needs that had gone through the Camphill schools could find a home and place to work. At the same time, Sleigh was a priest in the Camphill communities, arranging for a chapel to be built at Alpha.

== Public engagement, counseling and outreach ==
Through his long association with Vera Grover from the early days in Hermanus, Sleigh joined forces with her in founding the Western Cape Forum for Mental Handicap (today the Western Cape Forum for Intellectual Disability) in an attempt to uplift the quality of life and the awareness of people with disabilities more effectively throughout the country. He was the founding chairman from 1971 to 1985 and the first Honorary Life Member of the Forum. Besides this, he was on the Executive of the National Council's (SANC) division for Mental Health and succeeded Grover as chairperson (1980-1984).

Soon after its inception in 1968, through his friendship with Rosemary van Niekerk, Western Cape Secretary of Lifeline South Africa, the telephone counseling service, Sleigh took the training as counsellor with Rev. Peter Storey. Lifeline had been founded in Australia in 1963 by Sir Alan Walker, using the counseling psychology and techniques developed by Carl Rogers and there are now centres in many different countries. Sleigh worked there as a volunteer for many years and helped set up the training together with Alan Hardie after the transfer of Peter Storey to Johannesburg as a Methodist bishop and inspired his book Crisis Points.

From 1968 onwards, beginning with the resettlement of former residents from District Six, the coloured township of Atlantis began to develop close to the Camphill village. Sleigh realised that facilities for the inevitable Special Needs requirements that are present in every community would have to be developed there. So he started the project that was, in time, to be taken over by Veronica Jackson and later by Mellville Segal, who wrote the book Turn Right At Magnolia Street to commemorate these experiences. Both had been long time co-workers of Camphill. They named the project Orion and it continues to function independently today under the name Orion Friendship Organisation.

== Published work ==
- Crisis Points - Working Through Personal Problems Floris Books June 1998 ISBN 9780863152825
- Friends and Lovers - Working Through Relationships Floris Books December 1999 ISBN 9780863152672
- Thirteen to Nineteen Floris Books January 2000 ISBN 9780863152832
- A Walk Through My Life The Visual Junction, Cape Town
