= Van Dyks Bay =

- Location within Western Cape Location within South Africa
- Coordinates: 34°36′50″S 19°21′29″E
- Country: South Africa
- Province: Western Cape
- District: Overberg
- Municipality: Overstrand

Area
  - Total: 2.85 km^{2} (1.10 sq mi)

Population (2011)
  - Total: 500
  - Density: 180/km^{2} (450/sq mi)

Racial makeup (2011)
  - Black African: 5.0%
  - Coloured: 3.4%
  - White: 91.6%

First languages (2011)
  - Afrikaans: 90.8%
  - English: 8.6%
  - Other: 0.6%
- Time zone: UTC+2 (SAST)

Van Dyks Bay is a settlement in Overberg District Municipality in the Western Cape province of South Africa.
