= Louis Serrurier =

South African cricketer

Personal information
- Born: 7 February 1905; Sea Point, Cape Town, Cape Colony
- Died: 16 January 1990 (aged 84); Hermanus, Cape Province
- Batting: Right-handed
- Bowling: Right-arm medium

Career statistics
Competition	First-class
Matches	30
Runs scored	1,281
Batting average	33.71
100s/50s	3/7
Top score	171
Balls bowled	2,439
Wickets	42
Bowling average	26.83
5 wickets in innings	1
10 wickets in match	0
Best bowling	5/103
Catches/stumpings	17/–
- Source: CricketArchive, 15 November 2022

Louis Roy Serrurier (7 February 1905 – 16 January 1990) was a South African first-class cricketer who played in England and South Africa in the 1920s and 1930s.

Serrurier was educated at South African College Schools and University of Cape Town, then won a Rhodes Scholarship to Brasenose College, Oxford. He made his first-class debut for Oxford University against Middlesex in early May 1925, scoring 25 and 2 not out and taking two wickets; his first victim was future British Prime Minister Alec Douglas-Home, known at that time as Lord Dunglass. In a further three games that month, Serrurier took six more wickets, but only once passed single figures, when he made 64* against Worcestershire.

His only games of 1926 were against the Australians and Ireland: he failed twice with the bat, but took six wickets in all. In 1927, however, he turned out 13 times, including seven County Championship appearances for Worcestershire in July and August; for them he hit 110 (his maiden century) and 59 against Gloucestershire. With the ball he claimed his only five-wicket innings haul, taking 5-103 for Oxford against Essex, and he finished with 26 wickets at 26.80, easily the largest season's aggregate of his career.

Serrurier then returned to South Africa, and between 1927–28 and 1929–30 he played for Western Province, having several outings in the Currie Cup in the latter season. He played mostly as a batsman, scoring two hundreds and a number of other useful scores; one of the centuries was a career-best 171 against Eastern Province in December 1928, and he took one wicket, that of Natal's South Africa Test batsman Herbie Taylor.

He returned to England to play two minor matches for MCC against Ireland in 1930, but back in South Africa he did make one final first-class appearance, for Transvaal against Natal in 1931–32. He acquitted himself well in a drawn game, hitting 56 in his only innings and picking up the wicket of Desmond Fell.
