= Overstrand Local Municipality =

Overstrand
- Local municipality
- Logo

- Location in the Western Cape
- Interactive map of Overstrand
- Coordinates: 34°25′S 19°20′E
- Country: South Africa
- Province: Western Cape
- District: Overberg
- Seat: Hermanus
- Wards: 13

Government
  - Type: Municipal council
  - Mayor: Archie Klass (DA)

Area
  - Total: 1,708 km^{2} (659 sq mi)

Population (2022)
  - Total: 132,495
  - Density: 77.57/km^{2} (200.9/sq mi)

Racial makeup (2022)
  - Black African: 38.0%
  - Coloured: 26.9%
  - Indian/Asian: 0.3%
  - White: 33.5%

First languages (2011)
  - Afrikaans: 53.5%
  - Xhosa: 29.2%
  - English: 12.3%
  - Sotho: 1.4%
  - Other: 3.6%
- Time zone: UTC+2 (SAST)
- Municipal code: WC032
- HDI (2021): 0.777 high

Overstrand Municipality (Afrikaans: Overstrand Munisipaliteit; Xhosa: uMasipala wase Overstrand) is a local municipality in the Western Cape province of South Africa. It is located along the Atlantic coast between Cape Town and Cape Agulhas, within the Overberg District Municipality. The principal towns in the municipality are Hermanus, Gansbaai and Kleinmond. As of 2022, it had a population of 132,495.

== Geography ==
Topographic map of the Overstrand Municipality

The municipality covers an area of 1,708 square kilometres (659 sq mi) stretching along the coast of the Overberg, from the eastern edge of False Bay almost to Cape Agulhas. At its western end it is separated from the City of Cape Town by the Kogelberg mountains; to the north it is separated from the Theewaterskloof Municipality by the Kogelberg and the Kleinrivier Mountains; and to the east it abuts on the Cape Agulhas Municipality along a boundary that runs generally north-south just to the west of Elim. The western part of the municipality consists mostly of a narrow coastal plain with mountains immediately behind, while the eastern part beyond the Klein River expands away from the coast to include a wider agricultural region.

Most of the towns in the municipality are on the coast, and due to the proximity to Cape Town many are holiday resorts. The largest town is Hermanus, which is situated on the northern edge of Walker Bay next to the Klein River mouth. As of 2011 Hermanus, which is the site of the municipal headquarters, has a population of 32,769. West of Hermanus, between it and the Bot River, are Onrusrivier (pop. 5,151) and Hawston (pop. 8,214) on the coast, and Fisherhaven (pop. 723) on the Bot River lagoon. On the other side of the Bot River mouth is the town of Kleinmond (pop. 6,634) and beyond it along the coast are Betty's Bay (pop. 1,380), Pringle Bay (pop. 801) and Rooi-Els (pop. 125).

East of Hermanus, the municipality includes a wider agricultural area set away from the coast. The village of Stanford (pop. 4,797) is about 15 kilometres (10 mi) inland on the Klein River. To the south, on the opposite side of Walker Bay from Hermanus, is the second-largest town in the municipality, Gansbaai (pop. 11,598). Just south of Gansbaai, on the southern edge of the Danger Point peninsula, are Van Dyksbaai (pop. 500) and Franskraalstrand (pop. 1,165). A little further along the coast is Pearly Beach (pop. 1,042). Inland from Pearly Beach, separated from the coast by a range of hills, is the agricultural hamlet of Baardskeerdersbos (pop. 103), while Wolvengat (pop. 50) is another agricultural hamlet in the far south-east of the municipality.

== Demographics ==
According to the 2022 South African census, the municipality had a population of 132,495 people, with an average annual growth rate of 5.0% from 2011. At 38.0%, "Black Africans" were the largest ethnic group, followed by "Whites" at 33.5% and "Coloureds" at 26.9%.

The region's reputation as a retirement and resort hub is reflected in the age demographics, as 15.1% of residents were over the age of 65, compared to just 6% in South Africa as a whole.

== Politics ==
The municipal council consists of twenty-five members elected by mixed-member proportional representation. Thirteen councillors are elected by first-past-the-post voting in thirteen wards, while the remaining twelve are chosen from party lists so that the total number of party representatives is proportional to the number of votes received.

=== History ===
By the end of the apartheid era in the early 1990s there were various local authorities established on a racially segregated basis in the area that was to become Overstrand. Municipal councils were elected by the white residents of the towns of Betty's Bay, Kleinmond, Onrusrivier, Hermanus, Stanford, and Gansbaai; and local councils by the white residents of the villages and holiday resorts: Pringle Bay, Rooi-Els, Vermont, Sandbaai, Pearly Beach, De Kelders, Kleinbaai, and Franskraalstrand. The coloured areas of Kleinmond, Stanford, Hawston, Mount Pleasant and Gansbaai were governed by management committees subordinate to the white municipalities; and the black area of Zwelihle was governed by a town council established under the Black Local Authorities Act. Rural areas were served by the Overberg Regional Services Council.

While the negotiations to end apartheid were taking place a process was established for local authorities to negotiate voluntary mergers. In January 1993 the Municipality of Kleinmond merged with its management committee to form a single Municipality for the Area of Kleinmond; and the Municipality of Gansbaai merged with its management committee and the local councils of De Kelders, Kleinbaai, Franskraalstrand and Pearly Beach to form a single Municipality for the Area of Gansbaai. In January 1994 the Betty's Bay Municipality merged with the local councils of Pringle Bay and Rooi-Els to form the Hangklip Municipality.

After the national elections of 1994 a process of local government transformation began, in which negotiations were held between the existing local authorities, political parties, and local community organisations. As an outcome of these negotiations, transitional local councils (TLCs) were created and the existing local authorities were dissolved. In December 1994, the Greater Hermanus TLC replaced the Hermanus Municipality, the Onrusrivier Municipality, the Zwelihle Town Council, the management committees of Hawston and Mount Pleasant, and the local councils of Vermont and Sandbaai. In the same month the Gansbaai TLC replaced the Municipality for the Area of Gansbaai. In January 1995 Hangklip/Kleinmond TLC replaced Hangklip Municipality and the Municipality for the Area of Kleinmond, and the Stanford TLC replaced the Municipality of Stanford and the Stanford Management Committee.

The transitional councils were initially made up of members nominated by the various parties to the negotiations, until May 1996 when elections were held. At these elections the Overberg District Council was established, replacing the Overberg Regional Services Council. Transitional representative councils (TRCs) were also elected to represent rural areas outside the TLCs on the District Council; the area that was to become Overstrand included the Hermanus TRC as well as parts of the Caledon and Bredasdorp TRCs.

At the local elections of December 2000 the TLCs and TRCs were dissolved, and the Overstrand Municipality was created as a single local authority incorporating both rural and urban areas. It was considered a stronghold of the now defunct New National Party (NNP), which had held (sometimes concealed) majorities of two thirds in the predecessor municipalities after the November 1995 municipal elections, which were the first since South Africa had its first multi-racial elections.

After the 2000 election, Willie Smuts, previously mayor of Hangklip-Kleinmond Municipality, was elected mayor, representing the Democratic Alliance (DA), before he defected along with seven other DA councillors to the New National Party (NNP) after the October 2002 floor-crossing window. The NNP then formed a coalition with the African National Congress (ANC) when the council was reconstituted. After the September 2004 floor crossing Smuts then crossed the floor to the ANC along with most NNP councillors which gave the ANC an outright majority in the town for the first time.

At the time of the March 2006 local elections the eastern boundary with Cape Agulhas Municipality was moved west, with Cape Agulhas taking over rural land to the north and south of Elim. In the 2006 elections the DA won an outright majority of 10 seats in the 19-seat council. Willie Smuts was replaced as Mayor by Theo Beyleveldt. The DA consolidated its hold in the council following the September 2007 floor crossing window which saw the party gain an eleventh seat from the African Christian Democratic Party (ACDP). The ANC lost a seat to the newly formed National People's Party, as did the Independent Democrats, whose only representative in the Overstrand Council crossed over.

In the May 2011 local elections, the DA again won Overstrand outright, taking fifteen of the twenty-five seats on the council, with the ANC taking nine and the National Independent Civic Organisation one.

In the August 2016 local elections, the DA increased its majority to sixteen of twenty-five seats, with the ANC taking eight and the Economic Freedom Fighters (EFF) taking one.

In a by-election in December 2020, the Land Party won a seat from the ANC

In the November 2021 local elections, the council was expanded to twenty-seven seats. The DA won seventeen seats, the ANC four, the Land Party and the Freedom Front Plus two each, and the EFF and the ACDP one each.

=== Election results ===
The most recent election of the municipal council was held on 4 November 2026; the Democratic Alliance won a majority of 18 seats on the council. The following table shows the results of the 2026 election.

Party	Ward			List			Total seats
Party	Votes	%	Seats	Votes	%	Seats	Total seats
Democratic Alliance	26,229	60.56	11	26,599	61.45	7	18
African National Congress	5,932	13.70	4	5,799	13.40	0	4
Freedom Front Plus	3,864	8.92	0	3,749	8.66	3	3
Land Party	1,946	4.49	0	2,004	4.63	1	1
Patriotic Alliance	1,672	3.86	0	1,695	3.92	1	1
African Christian Democratic Party	774	1.79	0	770	1.78	1	1
uMkhonto weSizwe Party	666	1.54	0	668	1.54	1	1
11 other parties	2,227	5.14	0	1,999	4.62	0	0
Total	43,310	100.00	15	43,283	100.00	14	29
Valid votes	43,310	99.50		43,283	99.40		
Invalid/blank votes	216	0.50		260	0.60		
Total votes	43,526	100.00		43,543	100.00		
Registered voters/turnout	70,050	62.14		70,050	62.16		

=== Mayors ===
- Annelie Rabie (1 November 2021 until present) (DA)
- Dudley Coetzee (28 February 2018 – 30 October 2021) (DA)
- Rudolph Smith (2016–2018; died on 5 January 2018)
- Nicolette Botha-Guthrie (2010–2016) (DA)
- Theo Beyleveldt (March 2006 – 2010) (DA)
- Willie Smuts (September 2004 – March 2006) (ANC)
- Willie Smuts (October 2002 – September 2004) (NNP)
- Willie Smuts (December 2000 – October 2002) (DA)
