= Annelie Rabie =

South African politician

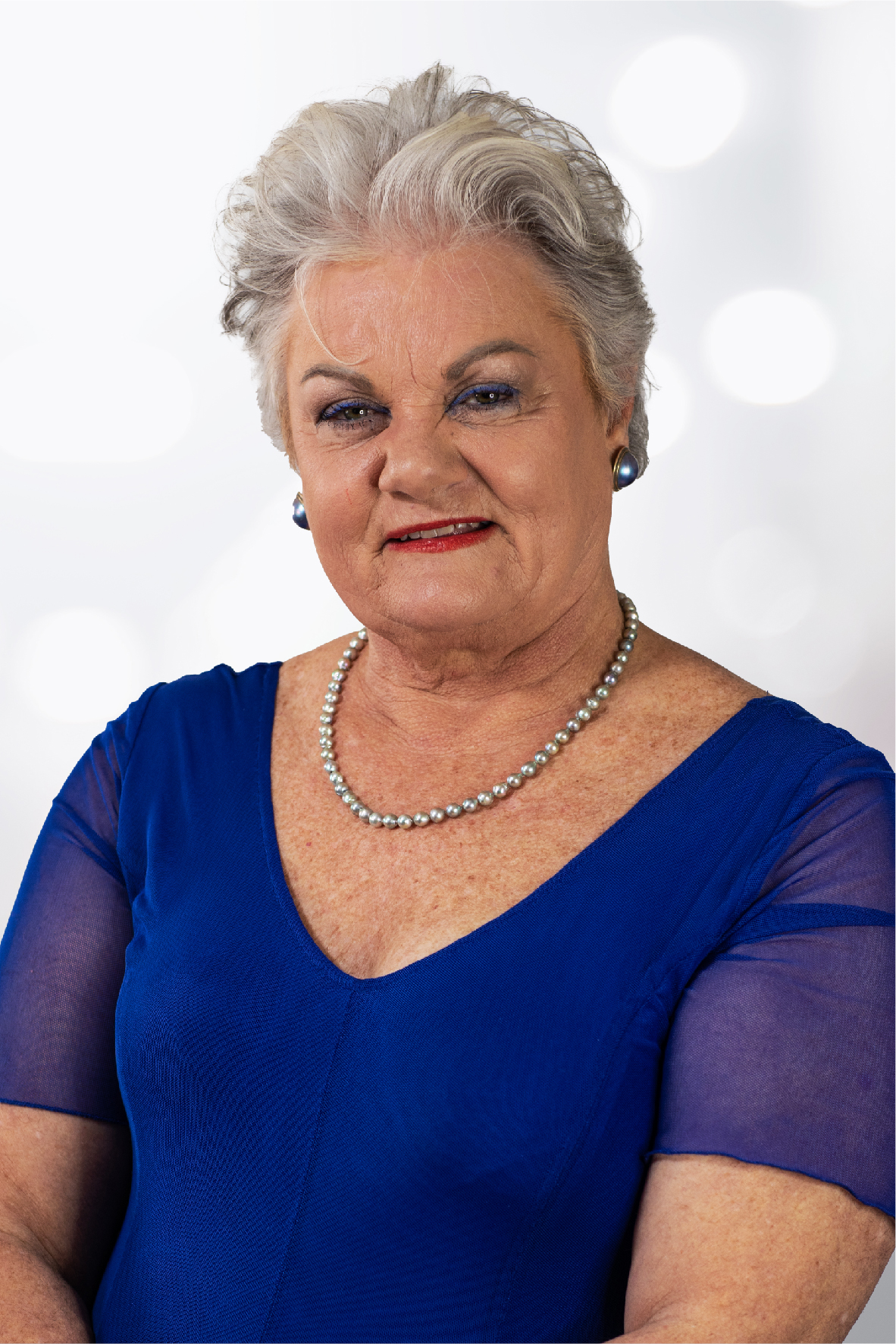
- Rabie in 2021

Executive Mayor of the Overstrand Local Municipality
- Incumbent
- Assumed office 17 November 2021
- Preceded by: Dudley Coetzee

Mayor of the Central Karoo District Municipality
- In office March 2018 – July 2020
- Preceded by: Noel Constable
- Succeeded by: Isak Windvogel

Personal details
- Party: Democratic Alliance

Annelie Rabie is a South African politician who has served as the executive mayor of the Overstrand Local Municipality since November 2021. Previously, she was the mayor of the Central Karoo District Municipality between 2018 and 2020. Rabie is a member of the Democratic Alliance.

== Career ==
Rabie was for many years the Cape Executive head of the Business Against Corruption non-profit organization until she was suspended in March 2011 after being accused of abusing her BAC credit card as well as increasing her salary without the organization's approval. She then submitted her resignation in April because she was nominated as the Democratic Alliance's mayoral candidate for the Prince Albert Local Municipality, but it was not accepted. Rabie was elected as a DA councilor in the Prince Albert municipality during the local elections in May and then as caucus leader of the DA on the council. After a long disciplinary process, she was fired by the BAC national management on 17 June 2011. According to a letter issued by the Commercial Crime Unit (Hawks) in February 2016, no charges were laid against Rabie, no investigation took place, and she was never charged and/or convicted of any offense by an official law enforcement agency.

Rabie was re-elected as a DA councilor in the Prince Albert municipality in the 2016 election and was also appointed as a councilor of the Central Karoo district municipality. In March 2018, she was elected mayor of the district municipality after the DA formed a coalition with the smaller Karoo Community Party. Rabie was removed from office by a motion of no confidence in July 2020 after the mayor of Prince Albert, Goliat Lottering of the KGP, suspended the coalition agreements between his party and the DA.

In August 2021, the DA named Rabie as their mayoral candidate for the Overstrand Local Municipality for the elections that would take place on 1 November 2021. The DA retained their majority on the Overstrand city council in the election and Rabie was then elected mayor during the first session of the council after the election on 17 November 2021 .
