= Theo Beyleveldt =

South African politician and retired military officer (1948–2011)

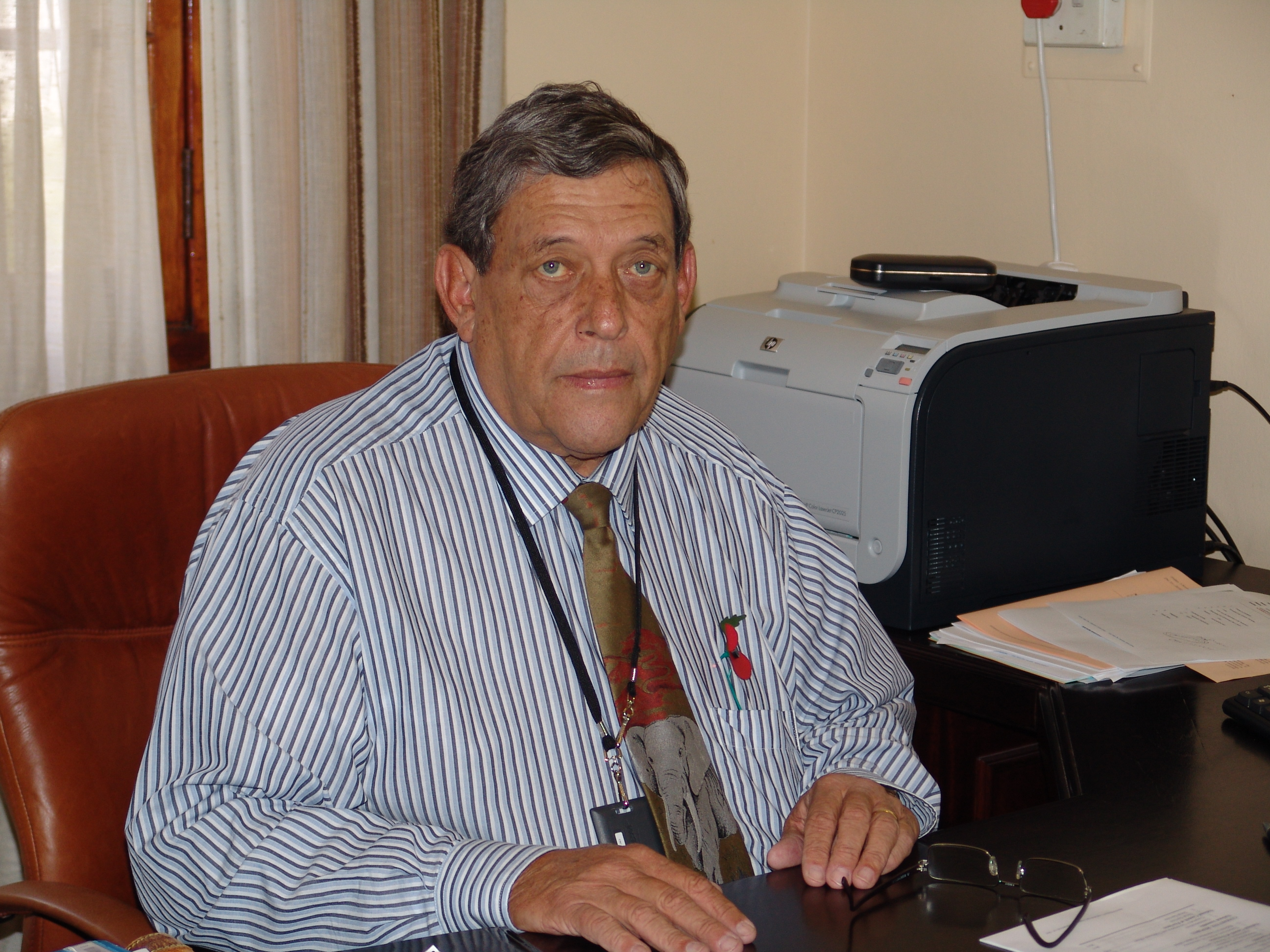
- Beyleveldt in November 2010

Permanent Delegate to the National Council of Provinces from the Western Cape
- In office 12 October 2010 – 3 July 2011
- Preceded by: Tim Harris
- Succeeded by: Denis Joseph

Executive Mayor of the Overstrand Local Municipality
- In office 2006–2010
- Preceded by: Willie Smuts
- Succeeded by: Nicolette Botha-Guthrie

Personal details
- Born: Theodorus Barnardus Beyleveldt; 12 February 1948 Warden, Orange Free State Province, Union of South Africa
- Died: 3 July 2011 (aged 63) Cape Town, Western Cape, South Africa
- Party: Democratic Alliance
- Spouse: Marianné
- Children: 2
- Education: South African Military Academy (B. Mil)

Military service
- Allegiance: South Africa
- Branch/service: South African Army
- Years of service: 1966–1999
- Rank: Brigadier-general
- Awards: Southern Cross Decoration SD Southern Cross Medal SM Military Merit Medal MMM

Brigadier-general Theodorus Barnardus Beyleveldt SD, SM, MMM (12 February 1948 – 3 July 2011) was a South African politician and retired military officer who served as a Permanent Delegate to the National Council of Provinces from the Western Cape from October 2010 until his death. A member of the Democratic Alliance, he was the mayor of the Overstrand Local Municipality from 2006 to 2010.

== Early life and career ==
Beyleveldt was born on 3 February 1948 in Warden in the Orange Free State Province. He matriculated from Sentraal High School in Bloemfontein. He joined the army in 1966 and graduated from the South African Military Academy in Saldanha with a Bachelor of Military Science. During his military service, he held multiple posts, including Chief of Staff of the Western Province Command as well as General Commanding at the Army Battle School in Lohatla. Following his retirement from the army in 1999, he was employed as a project manager for the Western Cape government.

== Political career ==
Beyleveldt joined his ward committee in Hermanus and the leadership of the Democratic Alliance in the Overstrand Local Municipality in 2004. He was elected mayor of the municipality following the 2006 municipal elections.

In a statement released by Democratic Alliance parliamentary leader Athol Trollip in September 2010, it was announced that Beyleveldt would be joining the National Council of Provinces as a replacement for Tim Harris, who would be moving to the National Assembly. Beyleveldt joined the NCOP on 12 October 2010. He was the provincial whip for the Western Cape provincial delegation.

== Personal life and death ==
Beyleveldt was married to Marianné. They had two children together.

Beyleveldt died in Groote Schuur Hospital in Cape Town on 3 July 2011. He was 63 years old. NCOP chairperson MJ Mahlangu paid tribute to him. His funeral was held on 7 July 2010 at NG Kerk in Hermanus. DA parliamentary leader Athol Trollip, NCOP deputy chairperson Thandi Memela and the Defence Reserve Provincial Office Western Cape attended his memorial service.

The NCOP paid tribute to him during a motion of condolence on 4 August 2011.
