= Walker Bay =

- Walkerbaai (Afrikaans)
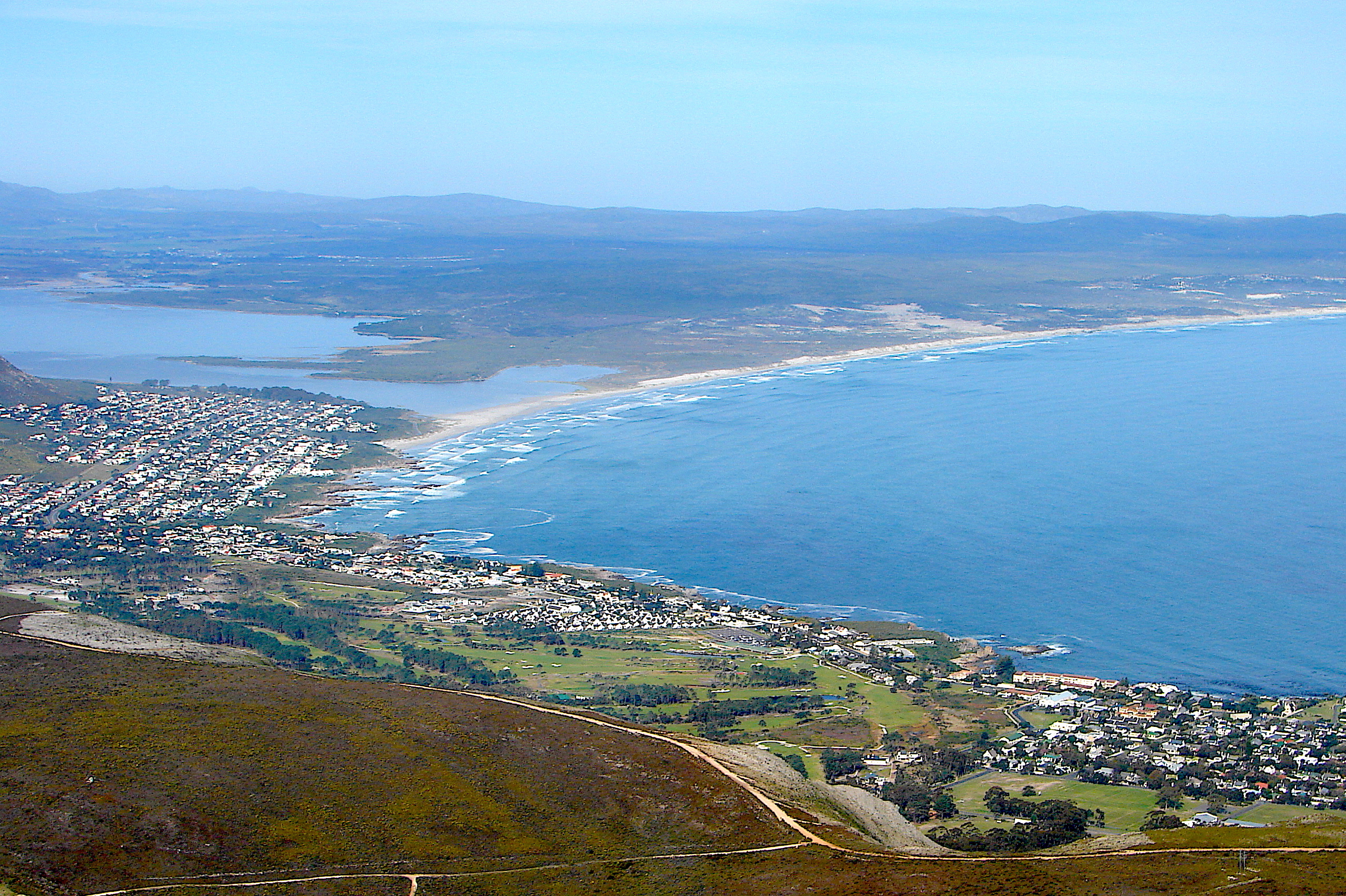
- Coastline of Walker Bay with Klein river lagoon

- Location in South Africa
- Coordinates: 34°30′S 19°20′E
- River sources: Klein river
- Ocean/sea sources: Southern Atlantic Ocean
- Basin countries: South Africa
- Settlements: Hermanus

Walker Bay is a large bay located in the south-western Western Cape province of South Africa. It is the next major bay between False Bay near Cape Town and Cape Agulhas to the south-east. The bay is famous for having some of the best land based whale-watching in the world, which a town on its shores, Hermanus, has become famous for. Southern right whales visit the bay in the winter and spring months.

Gansbaai on the shores of the bay has also become very famous for Great white shark diving.

The shores adjacent to the bay are protected as part of the Walker Bay Nature Reserve, and the bay itself is a marine protected area in which most boating and fishing activity is prohibited.

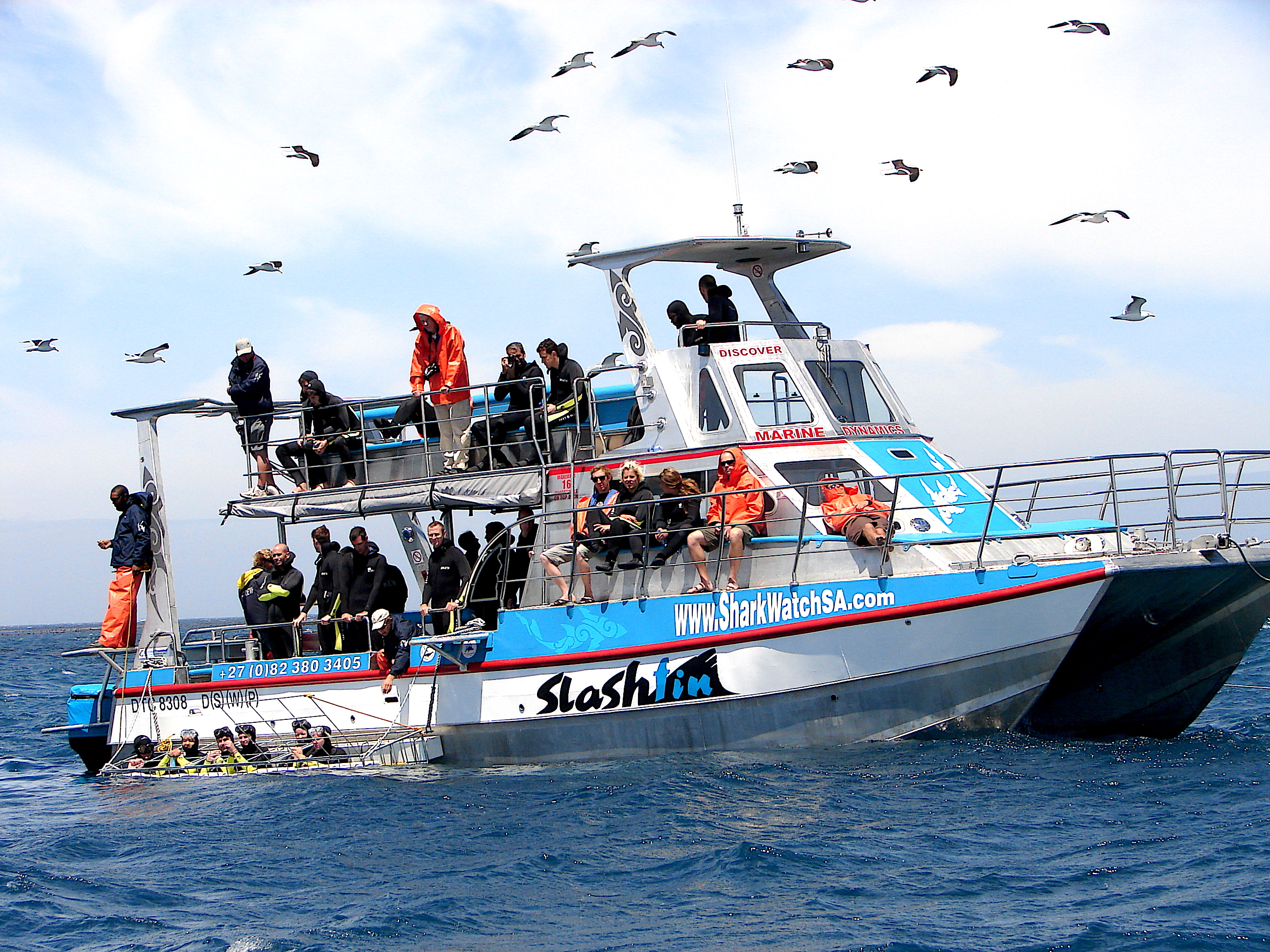
Cage diving at Gansbaai

== Wine ==
An up-and-coming South African wine region with a cooler climate than most. This allows for good Pinot noir and Chardonnay with top estates in the Hemel-en-Aarde Valley.

== See also ==
- List of bays of South Africa
