= Hermanus =

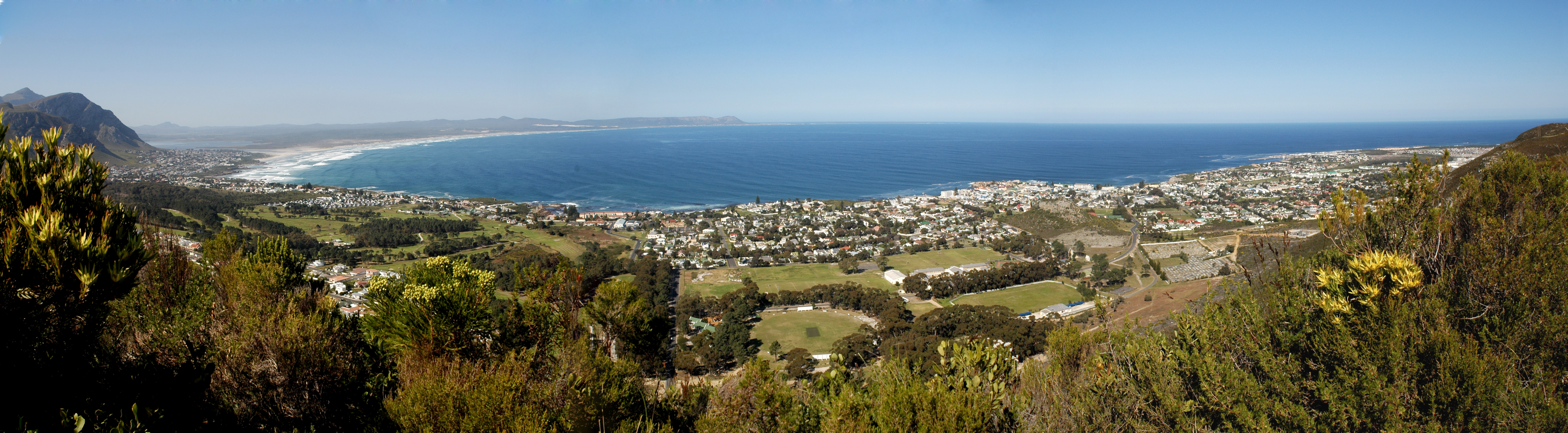
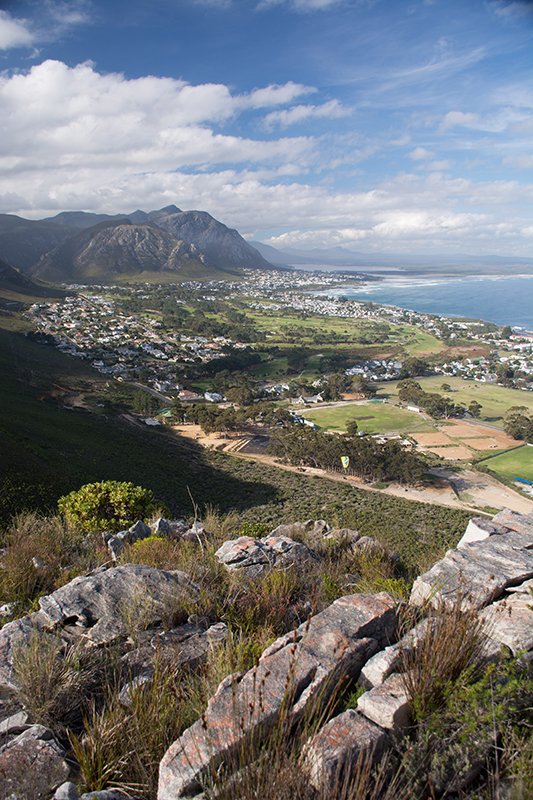
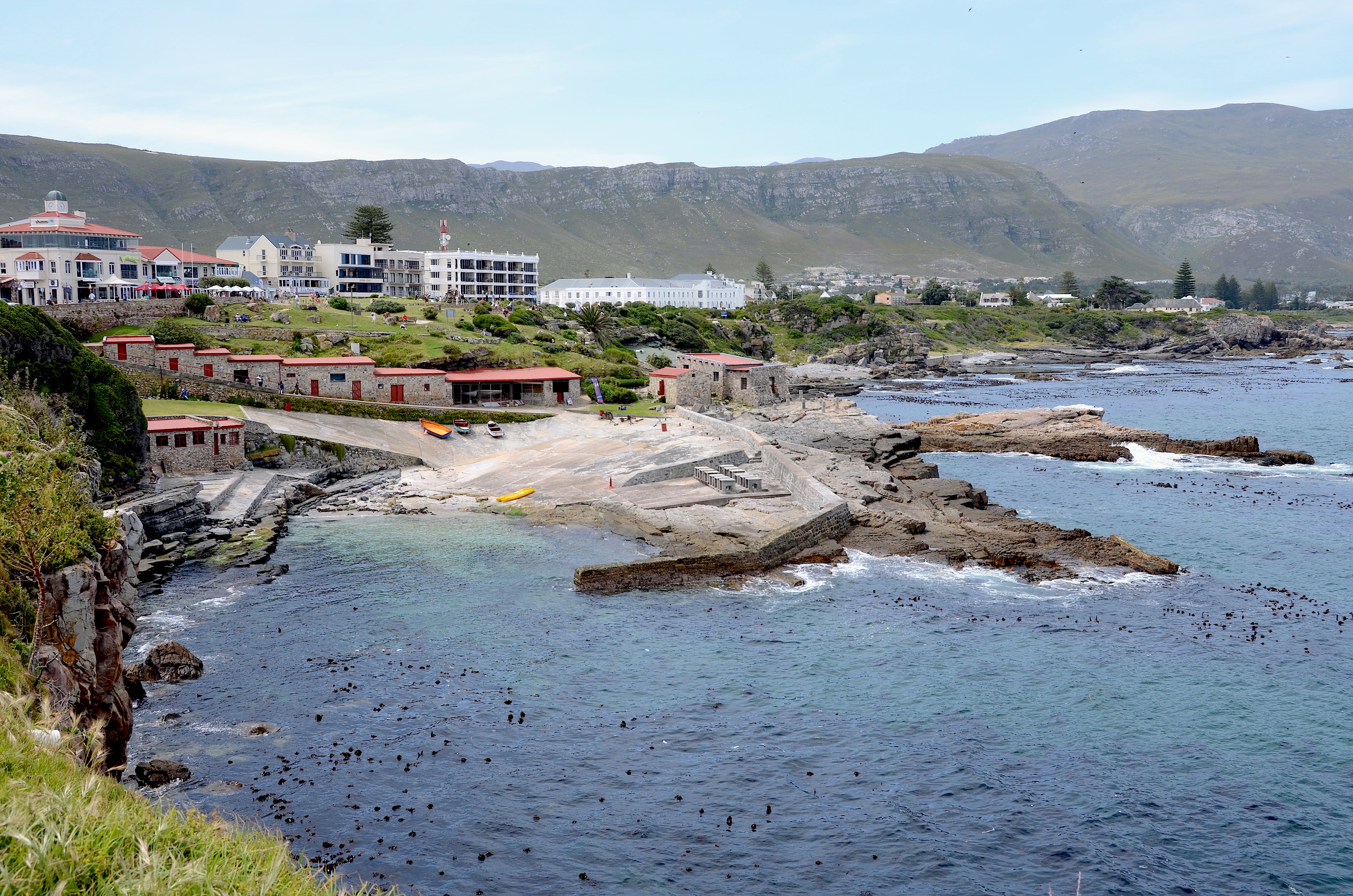
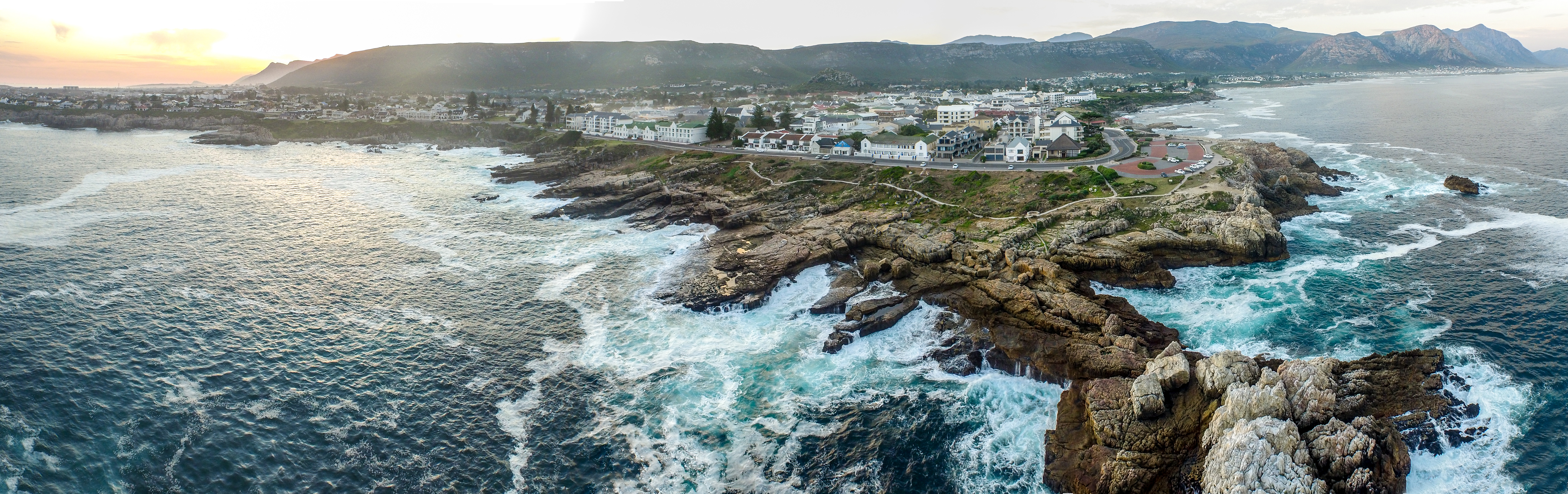
- Clockwise from top: Panoramic view of Hermanus, the Old Harbour, Hermanus coastline, view from Rotary Way.

- Location within Western Cape Location within South Africa Location within Africa
- Coordinates: 34°25′S 19°15′E
- Country: South Africa
- Province: Western Cape
- District: Overberg
- Municipality: Overstrand

Area
  - Total: 17.03 km^{2} (6.58 sq mi)

Population (2011)
  - Total: 5,610
  - Density: 329/km^{2} (853/sq mi)

Racial makeup (2011)
  - White: 80.66%
  - Black African: 12.25%
  - Colored: 5.65%
  - Indian/Asian: 0.78%
  - Other: 0.66%

First languages (2011)
  - Afrikaans: 44.68%
  - English: 31.76%
  - Xhosa: 0.64%
  - Sotho: 0.27%
  - Other: 22.64%
- Time zone: UTC+2 (SAST)
- Postal code (street): 7200
- PO box: 7200
- Area code: 028

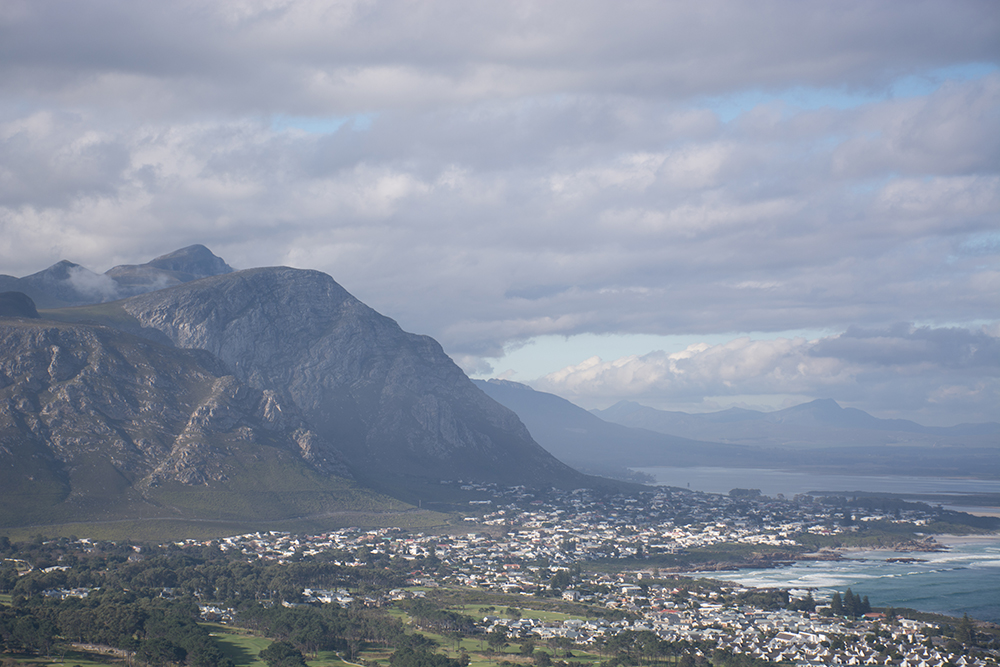
View of Hermanus and Grotto Beach from Rotary Way.

Hermanus (Afrikaans: [ɦærˈmɑːnœs]; originally called Hermanuspietersfontein, but shortened in 1902 as the name was too long for the postal service), is a large town on the southern coast of the Western Cape province of South Africa. It is known for Southern Right whale watching during the southern winter to spring seasons, and is a popular holiday location.

== History ==
Hermanus Pieters (c. 1778 – 1837) was a Dutch teacher who arrived in Cape Town in 1815. He was recruited by Dutch-speaking farmers who disliked that English was the only language used in all government schools. He settled in Caledon, but taught Dutch to farmers in a wide area around that town, including the Hemel-en-Aarde Valley. He often vacationed at the spring ("fontein") in present-day Hermanus, where he fished and grazed his sheep, the place eventually became known as "Hermanus Pieters se Fonteyn". He died before the village Hermanuspietersfontein existed. 65 years after his death the postmaster decided to abbreviate the name to Hermanus.

The parents of Roger Bushell, leader of the "Great Escape" (the escape by Allied airmen from Stalag Luft III in World War II), retired in Hermanus after World War II, and are buried there. Bushell's name is one of those commemorated on the war memorial.

== Location ==
Hermanus lies along Walker Bay on the south coast of the Western Cape. It is located about 115 km southeast of Cape Town and is connected to the Mother City by the R43 highway (or coastal R44 scenic route) and N2 motorway. The R43 continues to Cape Agulhas, the most southerly point of Africa. Hermanus is 40 km from Gansbaai, a spot where people can dive amongst the great white sharks. It is also notable that Hermanus still boasts a historic railway station building without a railway line. The founders of the town decided not to lay any tracks as this would have made Hermanus more commercial and felt that Hermanus needed to stay a small fisherman's village. To this day the locals still refer to it as "the village."

The town of Vermont borders Hermanus to its West.

Sandbaai lies on the coast at the entrance to the Hemel-en-Aarde (Heaven and Earth) Valley. It is the most recently developed and fastest-growing residential area of Greater Hermanus. Zwelihle, designated a "black" area by the apartheid era government, is a residential area that consists mainly of shacks. Following the COVID-19 pandemic the town has emerged as a popular destination for very wealthy South Africans to move to.

== Climate ==
Hermanus is classified as having a warm-summer Mediterranean climate (Köppen). It receives roughly 520 mm of rain per annum, the majority of which falls during the winter months of June to August in the form of frontal precipitation. Average midday temperatures range from 25 °C in February to 16 °C in July. Extremes above 30 °C and under 10 °C are not uncommon. Summer and Winter months are characterised by strong south-easterly and north-westerly winds respectively.

== Facilities ==
The Space Science Directorate of the South African National Space Agency, previously the Hermanus Magnetic Observatory (HMO), is a research facility of the National Research Foundation and forms part of the worldwide network which monitors variations of the Earth's magnetic field.

== Environment ==
=== Beaches ===
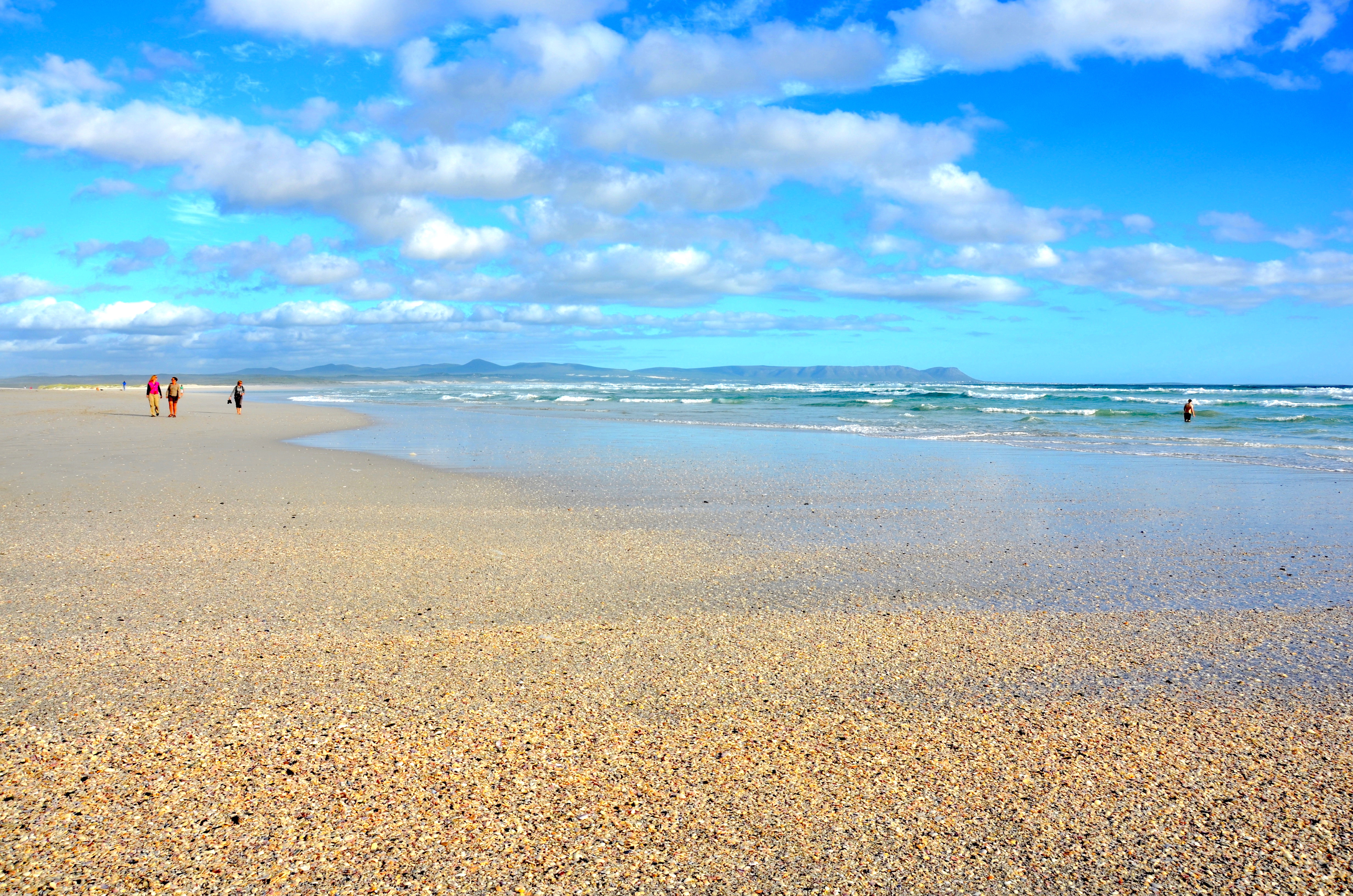
Grotto Beach near Hermanus

Grotto Beach is the largest beach in Hermanus and has also been proclaimed a blue Flag beach. Blue flag beaches meet international environment, safety and management criteria. Other beaches with Blue Flag status include Voëlklip, Onrus, Kammabaai, Langbaai, and Hawston. The rugged coastline also hosts many other smaller beaches, coves and tidal pools.

=== Floral diversity ===
Hermanus is in the Cape Floristic Region and thus has one of the highest plant diversity levels in the world. The principal vegetation type of this region is fynbos, a mixture of evergreen shrub-like plants with small firm leaves. In the local Fernkloof Nature Reserve, 1,474 plant species have thus far been collected and identified.

=== Bird watching ===
Over 100 varieties of bird species reside in the Greater Hermanus area. Species such as the Orange-breasted Sunbird, the Cape Sugarbird, Victorin's Warbler, and other rare animals, make Hermanus a destination for bird enthusiasts.

=== Whales and whale-spotting ===
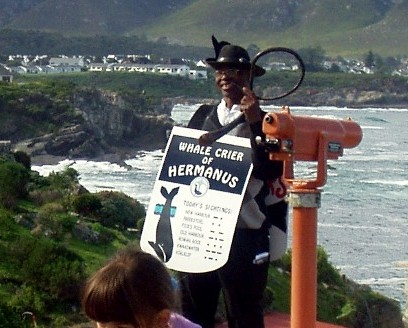
"Whale Crier" (recently retired Wilson Salukazana)

The town is noted for the presence of whales that often swim within sight of the coastline of the town. Although the Southern Right whale is the most prolific species in Hermanus bay, it is not the only species in the area. The whales can be seen from the cliffs all along the coast from as early as June and usually depart in early-December. They were once hunted in the nearby town of Betty's Bay, but are now protected. The Old Harbour Museum contains several exhibitions that explain the local whaling industry, and the De Wetshuis Photo Museum houses an exhibition of photos by T. D. Ravenscroft that depicts the history of Hermanus. The Whale Museum houses a skeleton of a whale and shows an audio-visual presentation of whales and dolphins twice daily.

Visitors can watch whales from the cliff-tops, from the air or via boats. Since August 1992, Hermanus has had the world's only whale crier, the first being Pieter Classen 1992–1998, then Wilson Salukazana 1998–2006, and Zolile Baleni since April 2006, who sounds his kelp horn to announce where whales have been sighted. In 2005, Zakes Mda wrote the novel The Whale Caller in which the Whale Crier of Hermanus is the main character, a man who gets enthralled by a southern right whale he names Sharisha. The book was adapted into a 2016 movie by the same name.

==== Whale festival ====
Hermanus hosts an annual Hermanus Whale Festival at the end of September, to celebrate the calving and mating season. Eco-Tourism is the main theme of the Hermanus whale festival with the Eco-Marine Village. Residents and visitors celebrate the migration of Southern Right Whales and other marine wildlife with ocean-themed activities and exhibitions, emphasizing education and environmentally responsible adventures and activities. Prior to this main whale festival, a Kalfiefees (or Calf Festival) is held, to welcome the first whales (usually in August). Both festivals are characterized by food and craft stalls, environmental presentations, and South African drama productions.

== Gallery ==
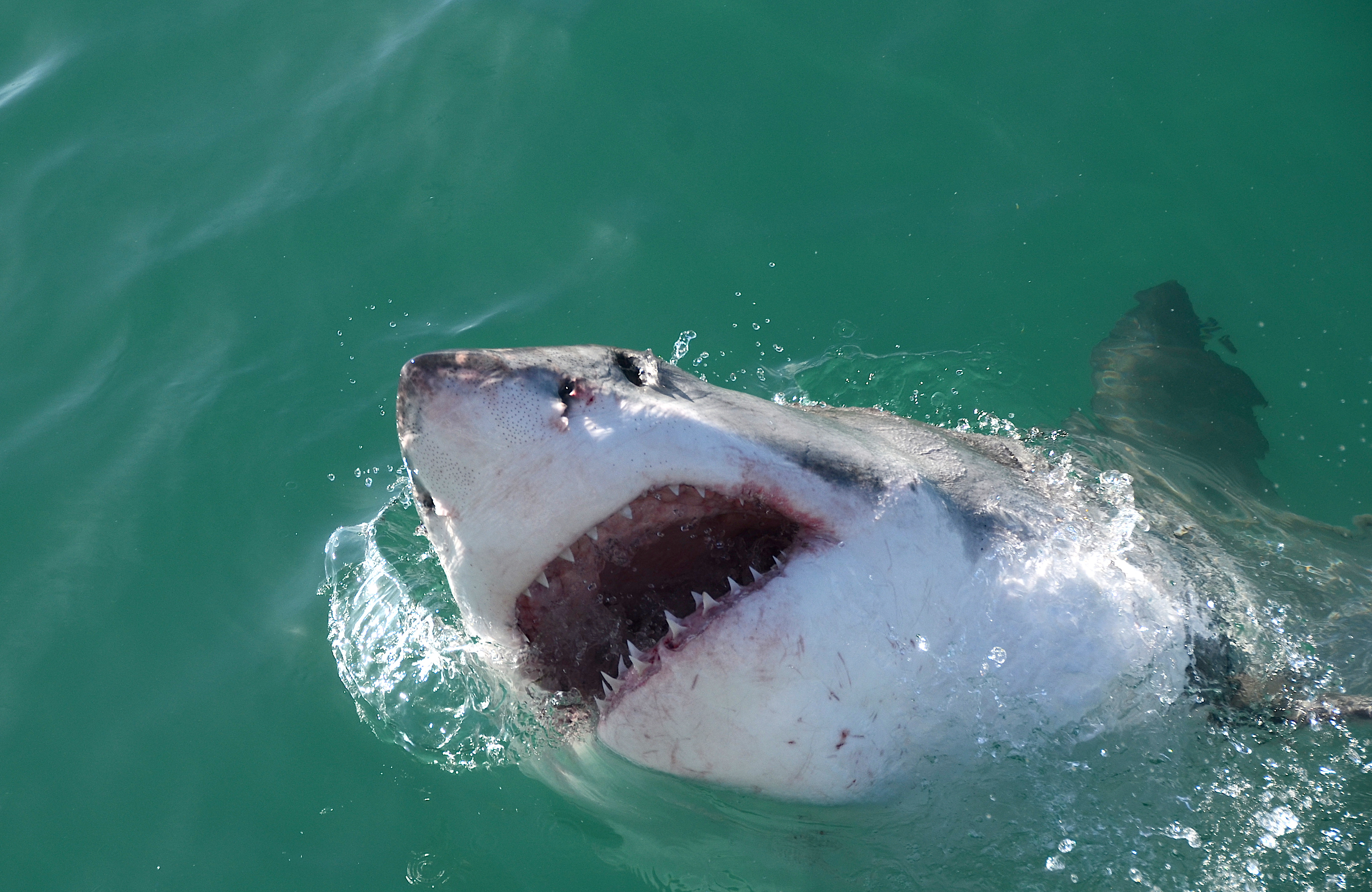
Great white shark near Dyer Island

An aerial video of the coastline along Hermanus with a view of the town.

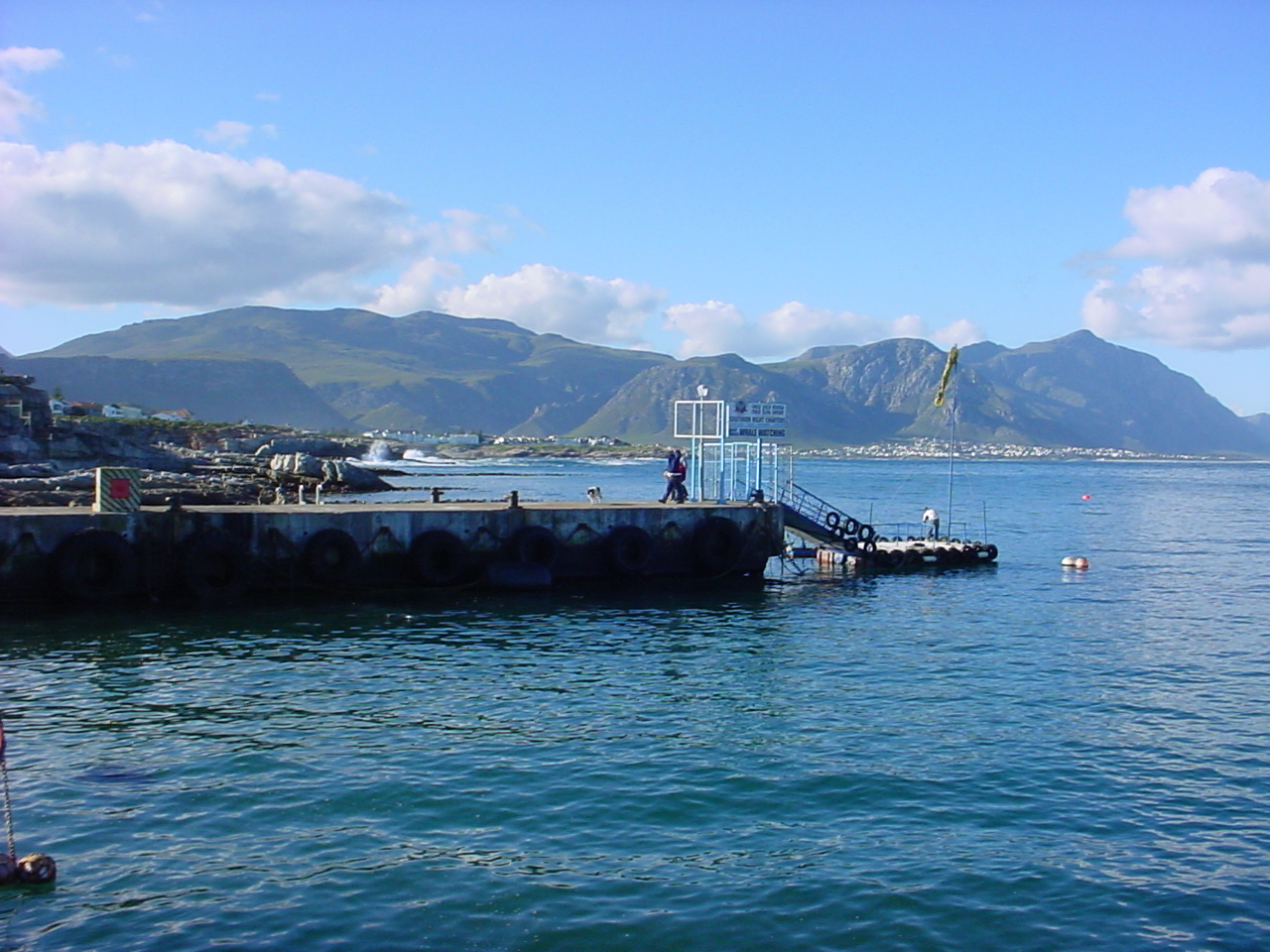
Hermanus's new harbor

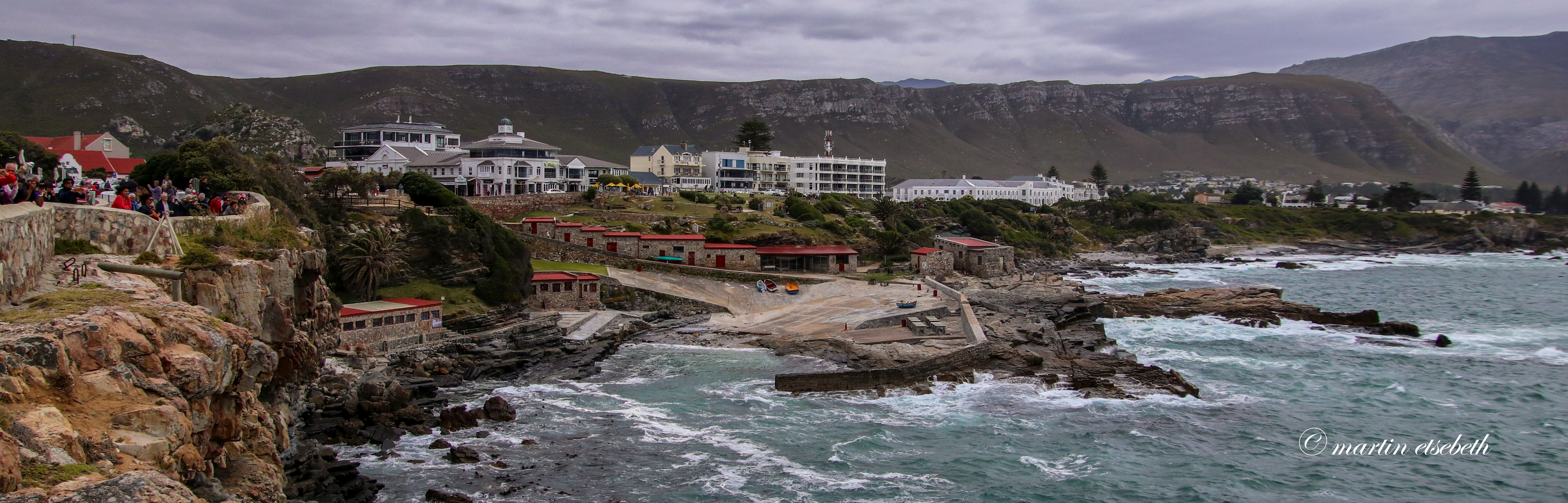

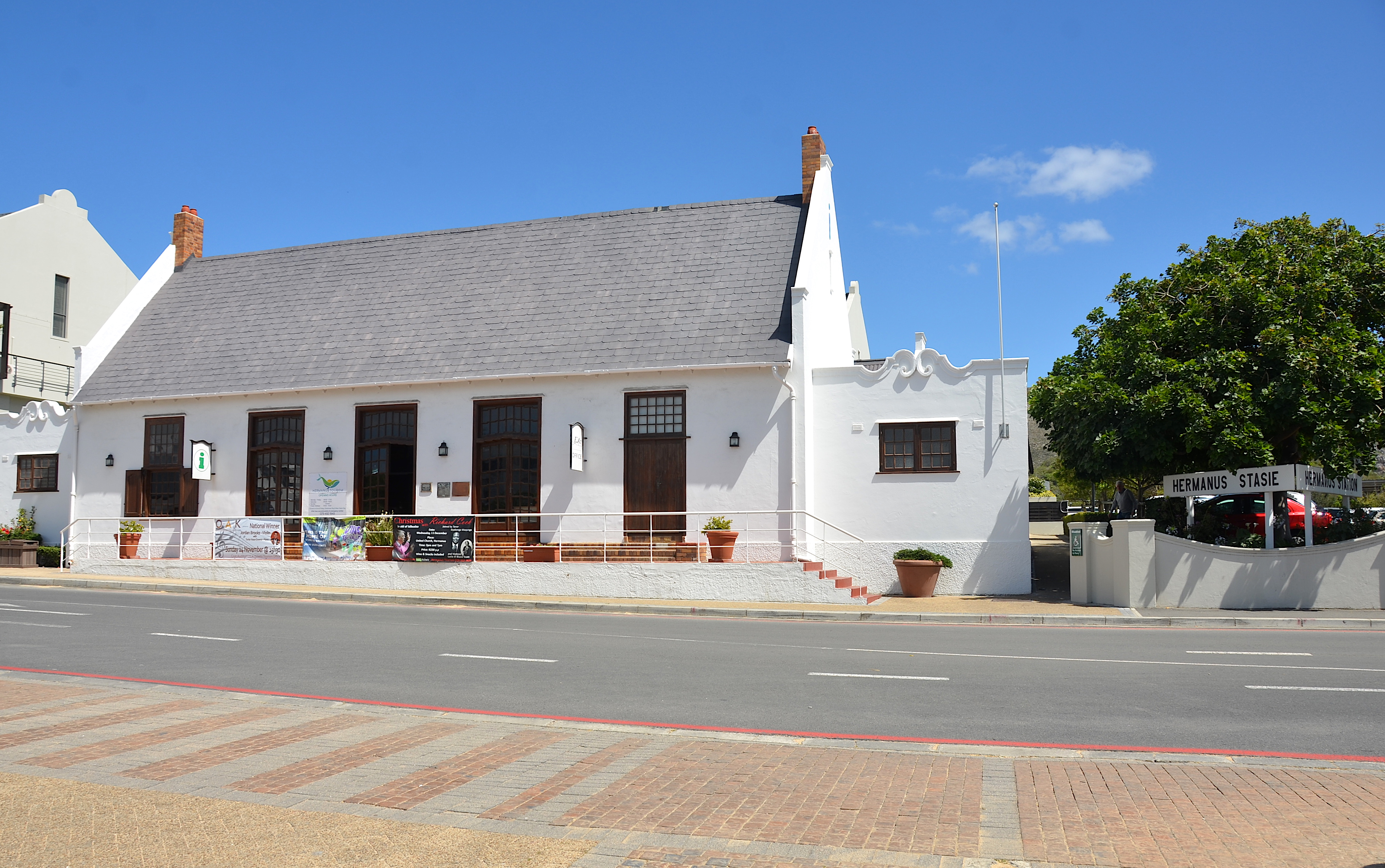
Historic bus station building

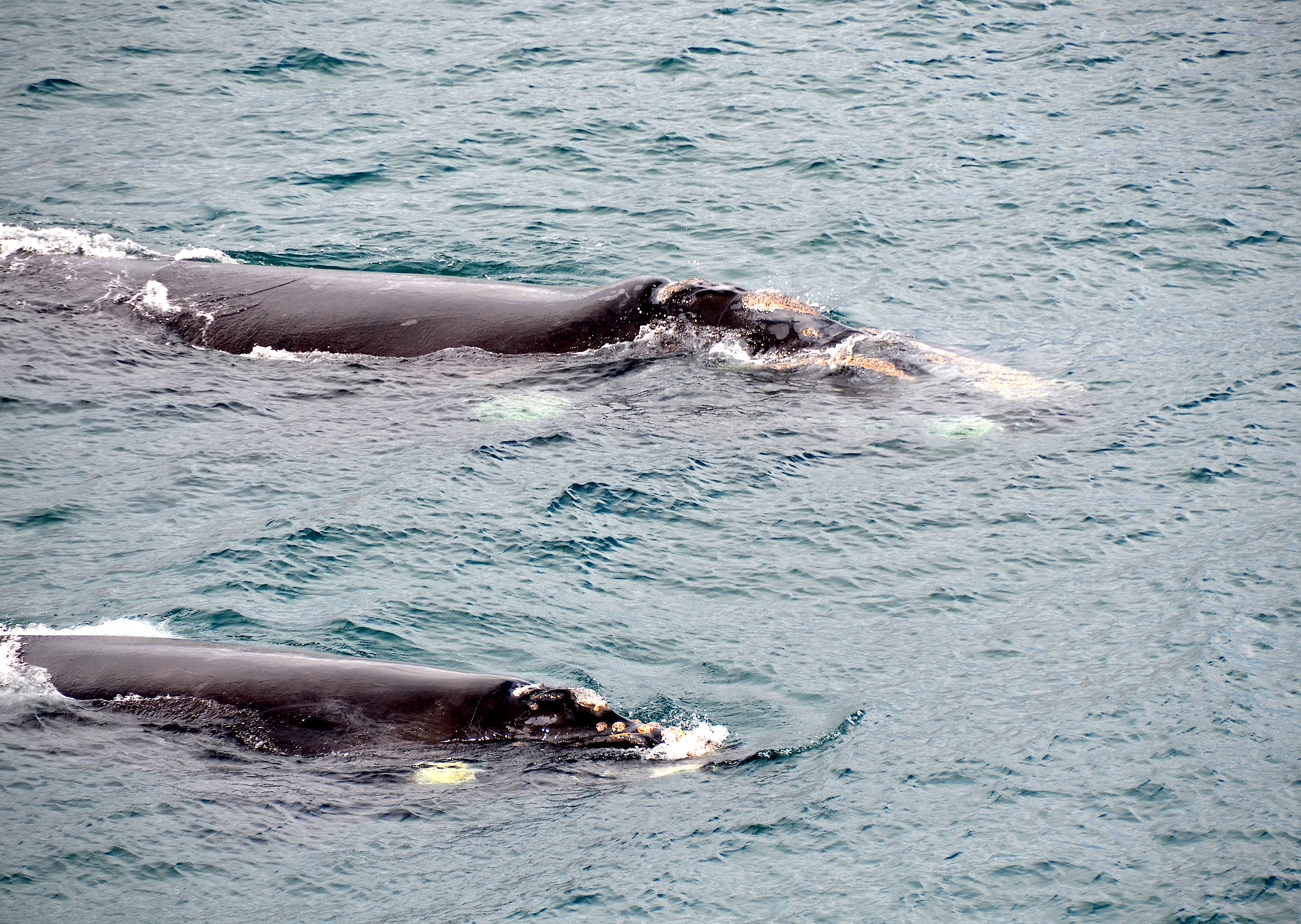
Southern Right Whales

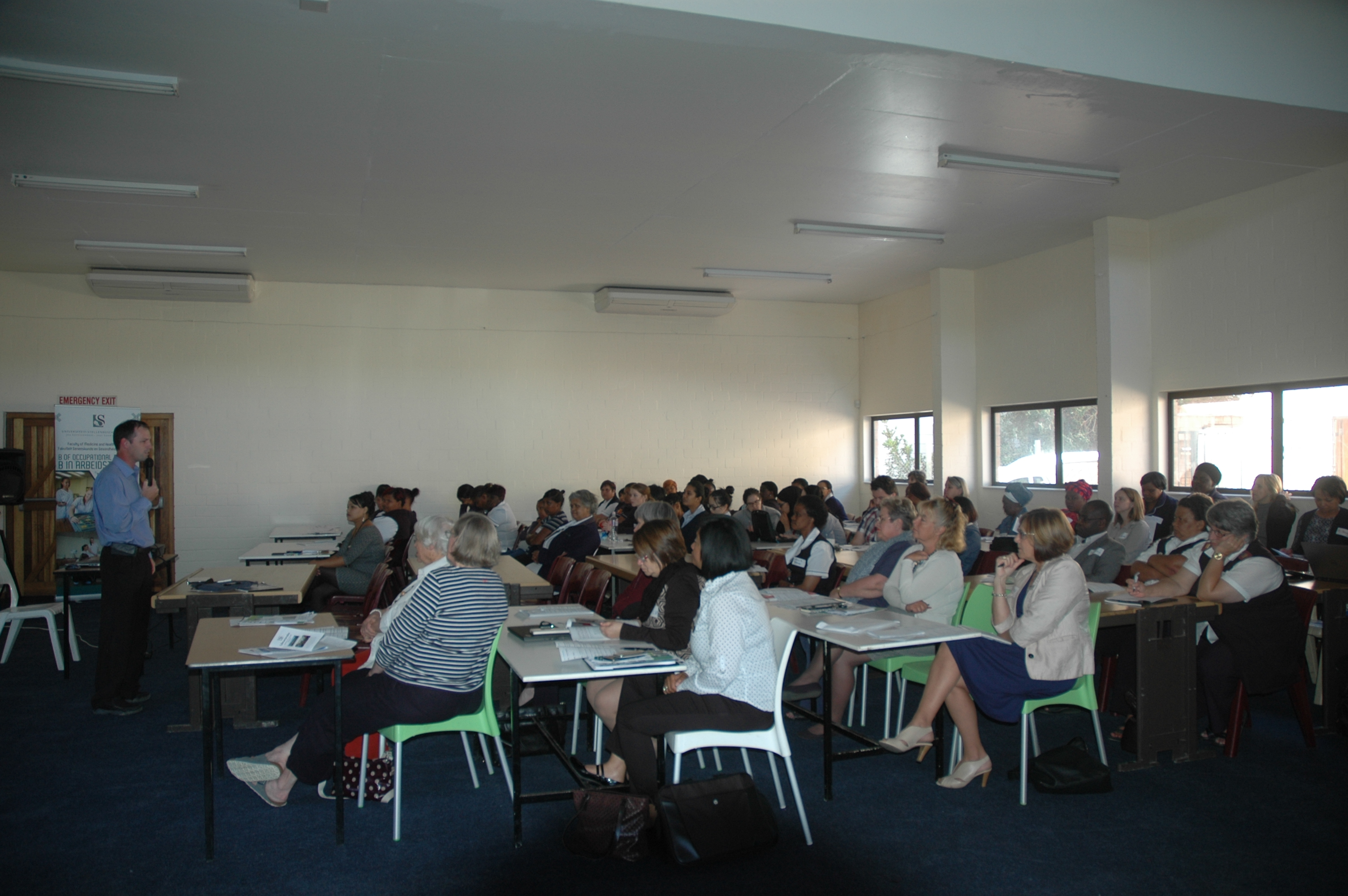
Hermanus Community Policing Forum meeting.

== Notable residents ==
- H. A. Humphrey (1868 – 1951), engineer and inventor.
- Ernest Frederick Watermeyer (1880–1958), lawyer and Chief Justice of South Africa.
- Stuart Cloete (1897 – 1976), novelist and author.
- Evered Poole (1902 – 1969), South African World War 2 military commander and diplomat.
- Louis Roy Serrurier (1905 – 1990), cricketer.
- Uys Krige (1910–1987), writer and novelist.
- Cecil Michaelis (1913–1997), artist and philanthropist.
- Athol Rowan (1921–1998), cricketer.
- Dick Westcott (1927–2013), cricketer.
- Julian Sleigh (1927–2013), priest and author.
- Harvey Wood Tyson (1928 – 2018), journalist and writer.
- Paul Johnstone (1930 – 1996), South African rugby player.
- John Michael Kumleben (1933 – 2014), cricketer.
- Piet du Toit (1935–1996), rugby player.
- Mervyn Gotsman (1935), professor of Cardiology.
- Barry Hilton (1956), stand-up comedian.
- Frank Opperman (1960), actor and musician.
- Petrus du Plessis (1981), rugby player and coach.
- Eden Links (1989), cricketer.
- Leolin Zas (1991), rugby player.
- Robert Hunt (1996), rugby player
- Jan Rabie, Afrikaans writer
- Markus Jooste, South African businessman

== See also ==
- Ports and harbours in South Africa
