= Onrusrivier =

- Location within Western Cape Location within South Africa
- Coordinates: 34°24′44″S 19°10′12″E
- Country: South Africa
- Province: Western Cape
- District: Overberg
- Municipality: Overstrand

Area
  - Total: 10.83 km^{2} (4.18 sq mi)

Population (2011)
  - Total: 5,151
  - Density: 475.6/km^{2} (1,232/sq mi)

Racial makeup (2011)
  - Black African: 6.4%
  - Coloured: 2.6%
  - Indian/Asian: 0.1%
  - White: 90.4%
  - Other: 0.4%

First languages (2011)
  - Afrikaans: 61.1%
  - English: 36.8%
  - Other: 2.0%
- Time zone: UTC+2 (SAST)
- Postal code (street): 7201
- PO box: 7201
- Area code: 028

Onrusrivier, or Onrus, is a settlement in Overberg District Municipality in the Western Cape province of South Africa.

The name Onrus means "restlessness", referring to the pounding of the surf on the rocky coast. Onrusrivier has been the home to some famous South African artists, including painters such as Marjorie Wallace (artist) and Gregoire Boonzaier. Onrusrivier has a popular beach and also a quaint tidal rock pool. Onrus is a predominantly residential area, situated between mountains, the Onrus river, and the seaside. There is an abundance of birds in Onrus, as well as animals such as mongoose and porcupine. The flora in Onrusrivier includes the ancient milkwood trees, and colourful indigenous flowers, which are seen only at certain times of the year.

== Gallery ==
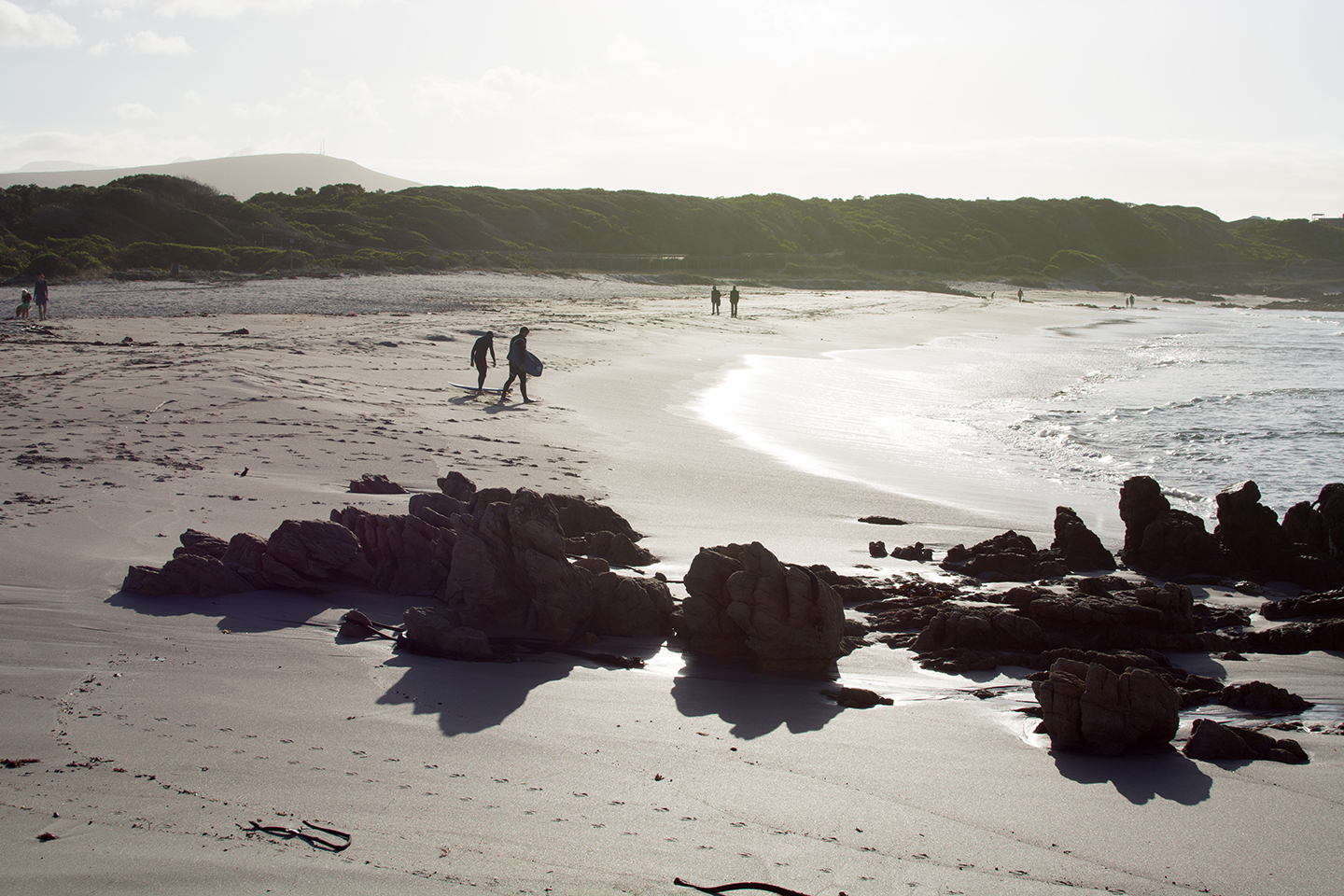
Onrus Beach

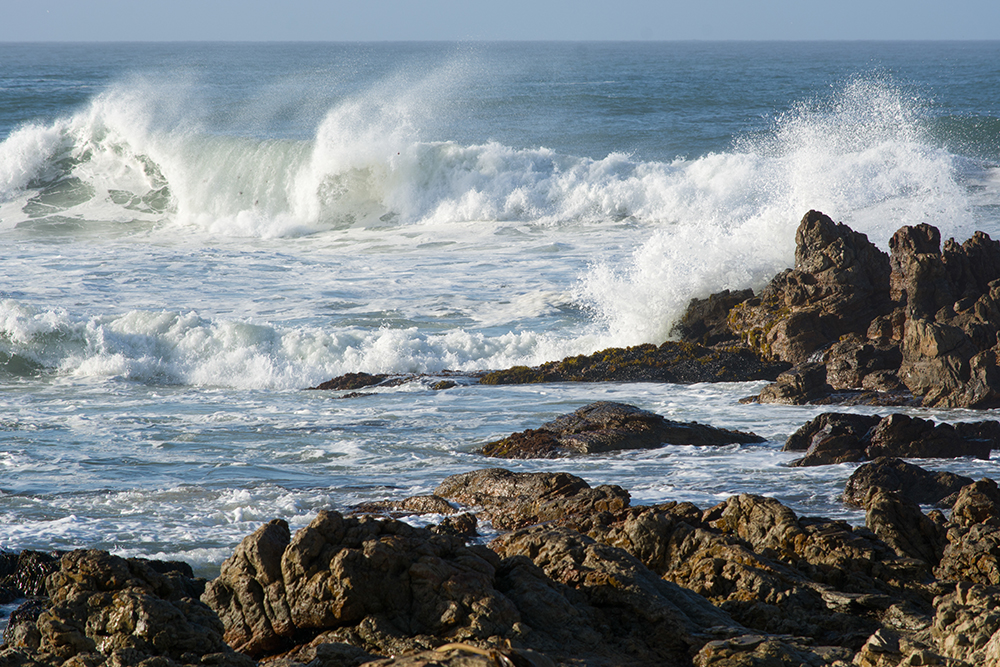
View from Onrus Beach

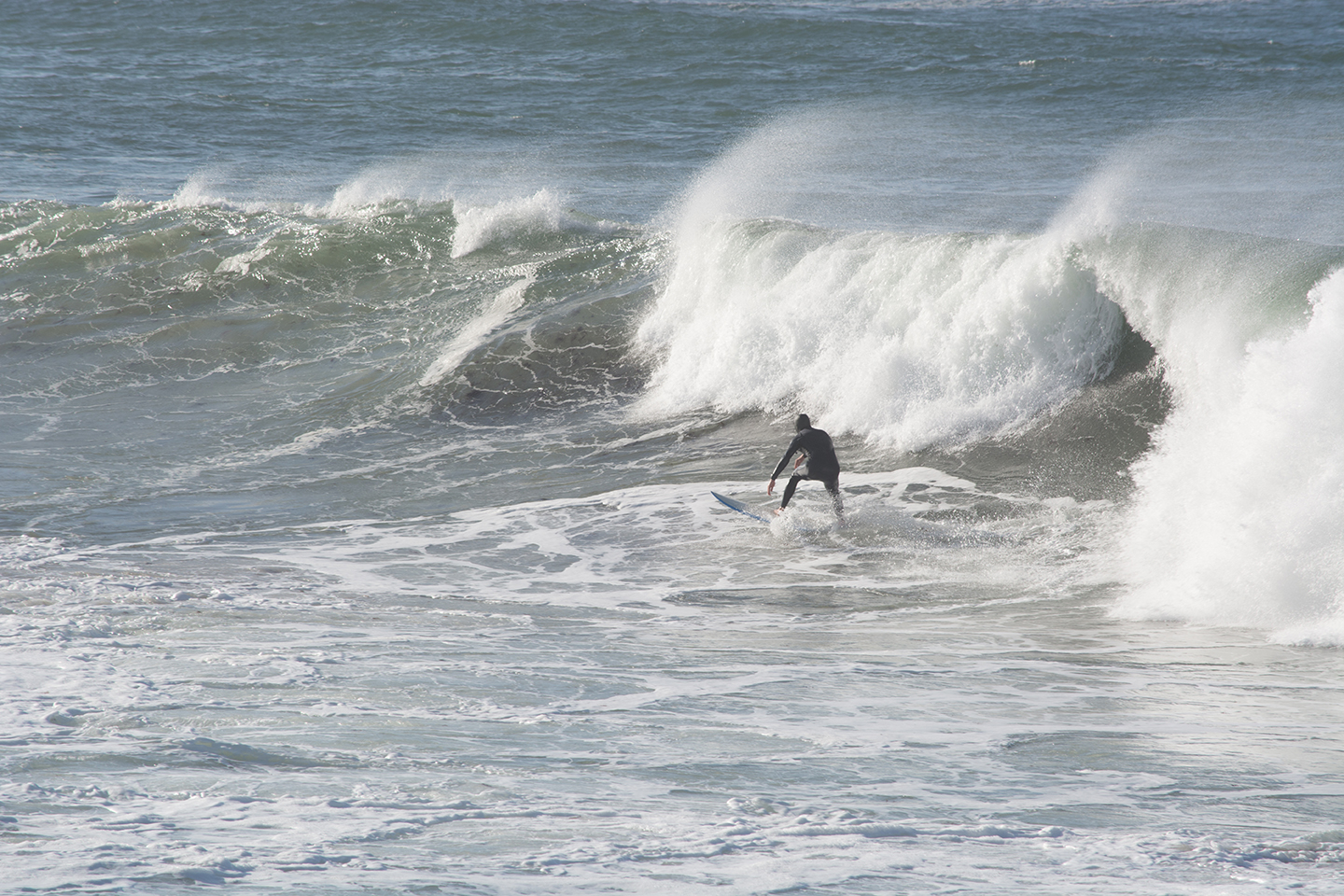
Onrus Beach Surfer
