= Overberg District Municipality =

Overberg
- District municipality
- Seal

- Location in South Africa

- Local municipalities within the Overberg
- Coordinates: 34°30′S 20°0′E
- Country: South Africa
- Province: Western Cape
- Seat: Bredasdorp
- Local municipalities: List: Theewaterskloof; Overstrand; Cape Agulhas; Swellendam

Government
  - Type: Municipal council
  - Mayor: Andries Franken (DA)
  - Deputy Mayor: Helen Coetzee (DA)

Area
  - Total: 12,241 km^{2} (4,726 sq mi)

Population (2011)
  - Total: 258,176
  - Density: 21.091/km^{2} (54.626/sq mi)

Racial makeup (2011)
  - Black African: 25.6%
  - Coloured: 54.2%
  - Indian/Asian: 0.3%
  - White: 18.9%

First languages (2011)
  - Afrikaans: 70.3%
  - Xhosa: 17.9%
  - English: 6.8%
  - Sotho: 2.1%
  - Other: 2.9%
- Time zone: UTC+2 (SAST)
- Municipal code: DC3

The Overberg District Municipality (Afrikaans: Overberg-distriksmunisipaliteit; Xhosa: uMasipala weSithili sase Overberg) is a district municipality that governs the Overberg region in the Western Cape province of South Africa. It is divided into four local municipalities and includes the major towns of Grabouw, Caledon, Hermanus, Bredasdorp and Swellendam. The municipal area covers 12,241 square kilometres (4,726 sq mi) and had in 2007 an estimated population of 212,787 people in 60,056 households.

== Geography ==
The Overberg municipal area covers 12,241 square kilometres (4,726 sq mi) lying to the south-east of Cape Town. It stretches from the Hottentots-Holland mountains in the west to the Breede River mouth in the east, and as far as the Riviersonderend Mountains in the north. It includes Cape Agulhas, the southernmost point in Africa, and has coastline on both the Atlantic Ocean and the Indian Ocean.

The largest town is Grabouw (pop. 44,593) in the Elgin Valley adjacent to the Hottentots-Holland on the north-western edge of the district. The municipal headquarters are located at Bredasdorp (pop. 12,749) in the southern part of the district. Other major towns are Swellendam (pop. 13,557) on the Breede River in the north-east, Caledon (pop. 10,650) in the western interior, and Hermanus (pop. 10,500) on the Atlantic coast.

The Overberg district is divided into four local municipalities, which are described in the following table.

Name	Seat	Population (2011)	Area (km^{2})	Density (inhabitants/km^{2})
Theewaterskloof	Caledon	108,790	3,232	33.7
Overstrand	Hermanus	80,432	1,708	47.1
Cape Agulhas	Bredasdorp	33,038	3,467	9.5
Swellendam	Swellendam	35,916	3,835	9.4
Total		258,176	12,241	21.1

It borders on the City of Cape Town to the west, the Cape Winelands District Municipality to the north, and the Garden Route District Municipality to the east.

== Demographics ==
The following statistics are from the 2011 Census. Note that due to fuzzing applied to statistics, columns may not sum to exactly the indicated total.

=== First language ===
Language	Population	%
Afrikaans	176,037	70.3%
Xhosa	44,857	17.9%
English	17,123	6.8%
Sotho	5,377	2.1%
Tswana	1,002	0.4%
Sign language	675	0.3%
Zulu	629	0.3%
Ndebele	462	0.2%
Northern Sotho	229	0.1%
Tsonga	211	0.1%
Venda	129	0.1%
Swazi	88	0.0%
Other	3,574	1.4%
Total	250,393	
Not applicable	7,781	

=== Race ===
Race	Population	%
Coloured	139,825	54.2%
Black African	66,151	25.6%
White	48,692	18.9%
Indian or Asian	816	0.3%
Other	2,692	1.0%
Total	258,176	

=== Gender ===
Gender	Population	%
Male	129,370	50.1%
Female	128,806	49.9%
Total	258,176	

=== Age ===
Age group	Population	%
0–4	22,804	8.8%
5–9	19,696	7.6%
10–14	19,634	7.6%
15–19	19,863	7.7%
20–24	22,349	8.7%
25–29	25,325	9.8%
30–34	20,040	7.8%
35–39	19,052	7.4%
40–44	18,159	7.0%
45–49	15,756	6.1%
50–54	13,314	5.2%
55–59	10,674	4.1%
60–64	9,983	3.9%
65–69	7,935	3.1%
70–74	6,012	2.3%
75–79	3,758	1.5%
80–84	2,181	0.8%
85+	989	0.4%
Total	258,176	

== Politics ==
The council of the Overberg District Municipality consists of twenty-one councillors. Nine councillors are directly elected by party-list proportional representation, and twelve are appointed by the councils of the local municipalities in the district: five by Theewaterskloof, four by Overstrand, two by Cape Agulhas and one by Swellendam.

After the elections of 3 August 2016, fourteen of the councillors are Democratic Alliance (DA) representatives and seven are African National Congress (ANC) representatives. The mayor is Andries Franken and the deputy mayor is Archibald Klaas; both are members of the DA. The following table shows the composition of the council after the 2016 election.

Party	Directly elected	Appointed by local councils				Total
Party	Directly elected	Theewaterskloof	Overstrand	Cape Agulhas	Swellendam	Total
DA	6	3	3	1	1	14
African National Congress	3	2	1	1	0	7

The following table shows the results of the election of the nine directly-elected members on 3 August 2016.

Party	Votes	Vote %	Seats
DA	53,502	57.9%	6
African National Congress	32,707	35.4%	3
Economic Freedom Fighters	1,852	2.0%	0
Dienslewerings Party	1,417	1.5%	0
VF+	1,311	1.4%	0
Independent Civic Organisation	740	0.8%	0
United Democratic Movement	706	0.8%	0
People's Democratic Movement	155	0.2%	0
Total	92,390		9
Valid votes	92,390	97.9%	
Spoilt votes	1,934	2.1%	
Total votes cast	94,324		
Registered voters	148,602		
Turnout percentage	63.5%		
