= Bot River Lagoon =

Section of the Bot-Kleinmond Estuarine System

Bot - Kleinmond Estuarine System
- Botriviervlei
- Coordinates: 34.34°S 19.12°E

Ramsar Wetland
- Official name: Bot - Kleinmond Estuarine System
- Designated: 31 January 2017
- Reference no.: 2291

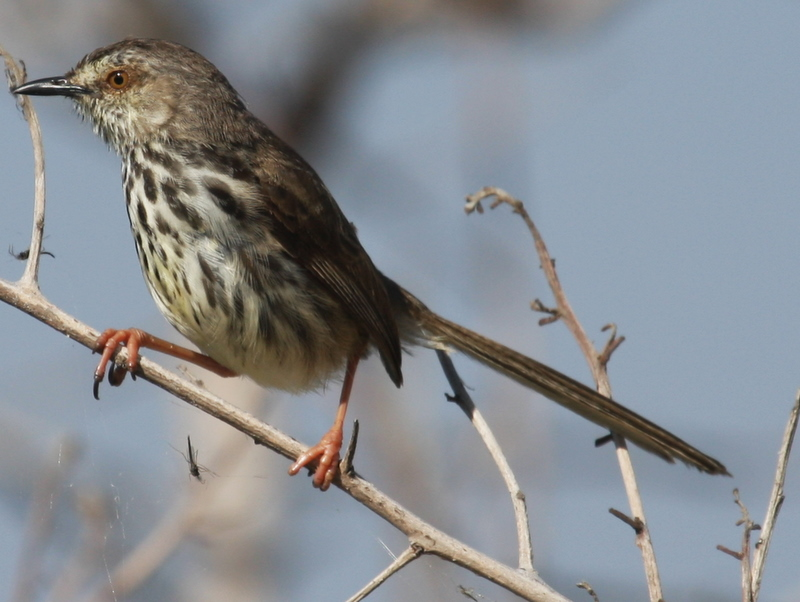
Karoo prinia at Rooisands Nature Reserve, on the edge of the Bot River Lagoon

The Bot River Estuary, also known as the Bot River Lagoon, is part of the Bot-Kleinmond Estuarine System in the Overberg region on the Western Cape of South Africa. It became a Ramsar site wetland in 2017. It is within the Kogelberg Biosphere Reserve.

== Geography ==
This wetland is the mouth of the Bot River, namesake of the town of Botrivier. The lagoon covers almost 13.6 km^{2} (5.3 sq mi) between Kleinmond, Hawston, and Fisherhaven. The lagoon is one of the largest open-water areas along the Western Cape coast and discharges into a shallow, triangular shaped lagoon in a wide valley flanked by mountains known as Botrivier Vlei.

The waters of the lagoon are separated from the ocean by a 100 to 200 m (330 to 660 ft) wide dune belt with a height of 3 to 6 m (9.8 to 19.7 ft) that is partly covered with coastal grasses and shrubs. The dunes have two narrow berms which are sometimes breached naturally or artificially. The main portion of the lagoon can have a length of up to 7 km (4.3 mi) and a width of around 2 km (1.2 mi).

The Rooisand Nature Reserve occupies around 60% of the western frontage up to the lagoon. The nature reserve is managed by CapeNature and is a designated Provincial Nature Reserve. The eastern side of the lagoon is mostly occupied with residential development. The head of the lagoon on the inland side is surrounded by agricultural land.

== Ecology ==
During the dry summer months, the Lagoon is a major refuge for waterfowl, of which 86 species can be found here. Coots come some years in particularly large numbers. The size of the bird population, however, varies drastically year to year based on fluctuations in water depth and quality as well as how connected the wetland is to the sea.

The lagoon is also an important fish spawning ground. 41 species of fish are recorded here, out of which 19 are dependent on such estuaries for their life cycle.

Invasive species, especially Acacia cyclops and African clawed frogs, are an increasing threat to the wetland. Residents and holidaymakers alike enjoy fishing, swimming, rowing, and sailing here.
