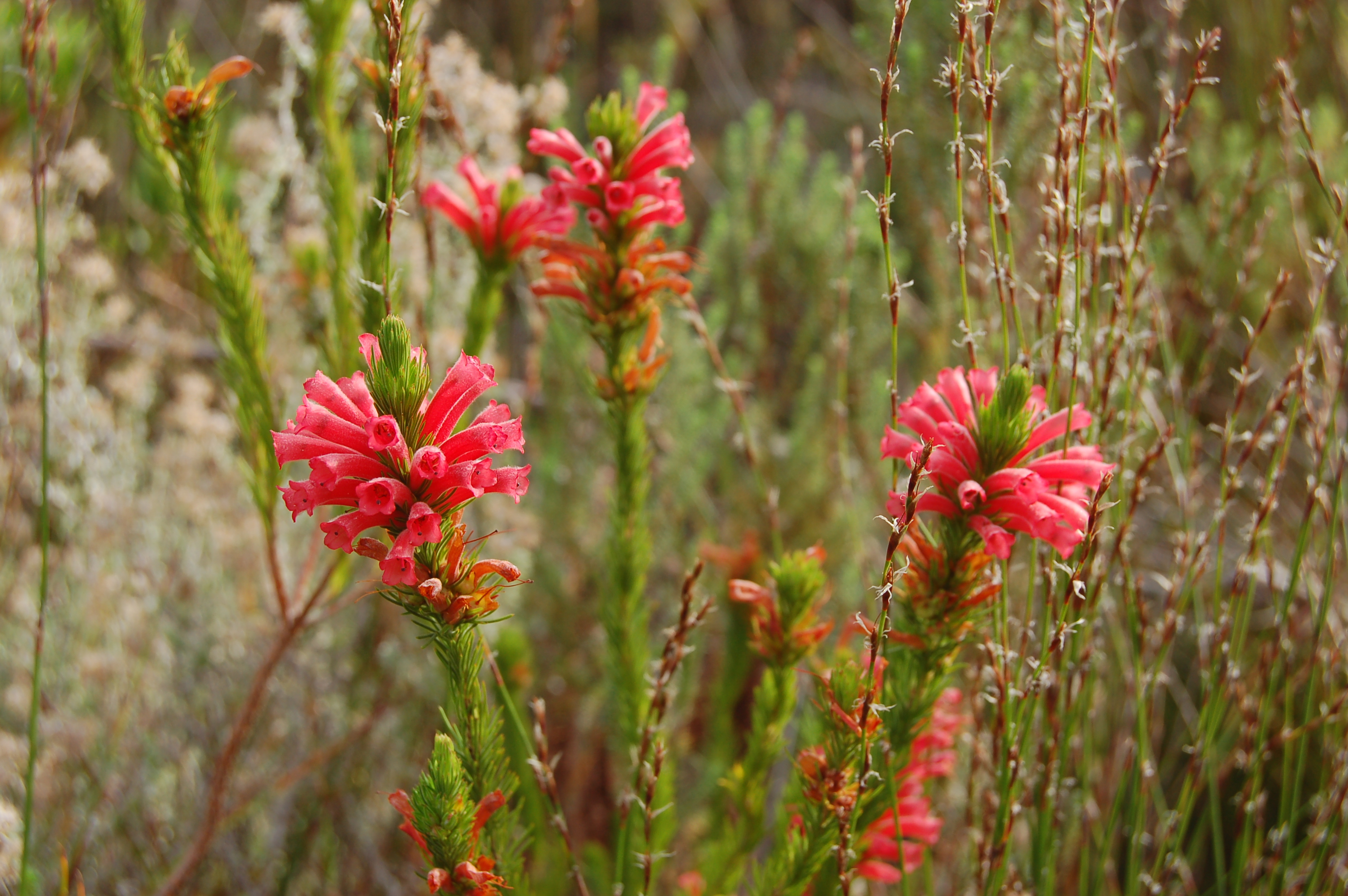

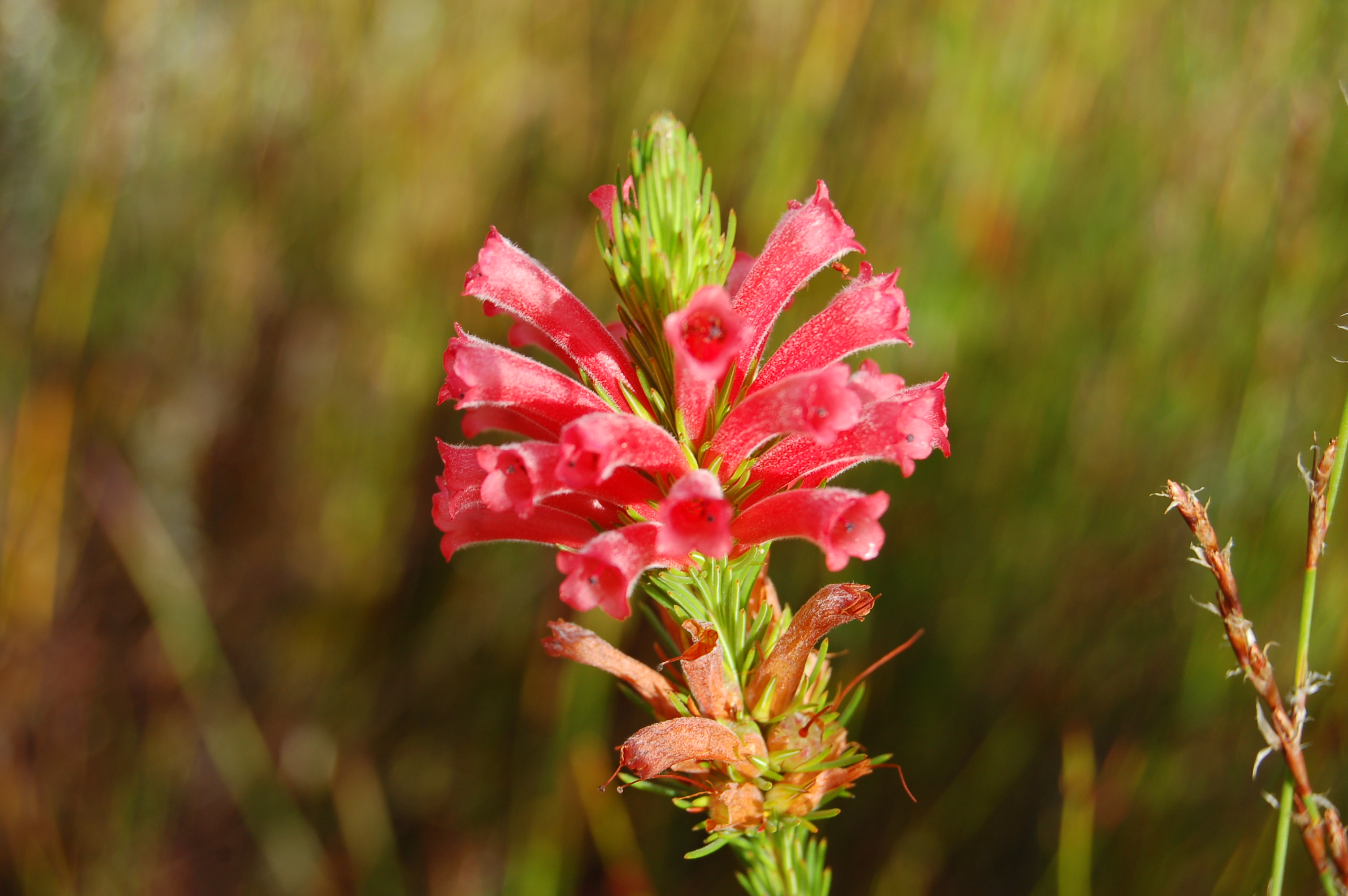

Scientific classification
- Kingdom: Plantae
- Clade: Tracheophytes
- Clade: Angiosperms
- Clade: Eudicots
- Clade: Asterids
- Order: Ericales
- Family: Ericaceae
- Genus: Erica
- Species: E. pillansii

Binomial name
- Erica pillansii Bolus

= Erica pillansii =

Species of flowering plant

Erica pillansii is a plant belonging to the genus Erica and is part of the fynbos. The species is endemic to the Western Cape where it occurs on the low hills between Pringle Bay and Kleinmond. The species was once popular as a cut flower but this use has now been discontinued and the plant is protected in the Kogelberg Nature Reserve.

The plant has one subspecies: Erica pillansii subsp. fervida (L.Bolus) E.G.H.Oliv. & I.M.Oliv.
