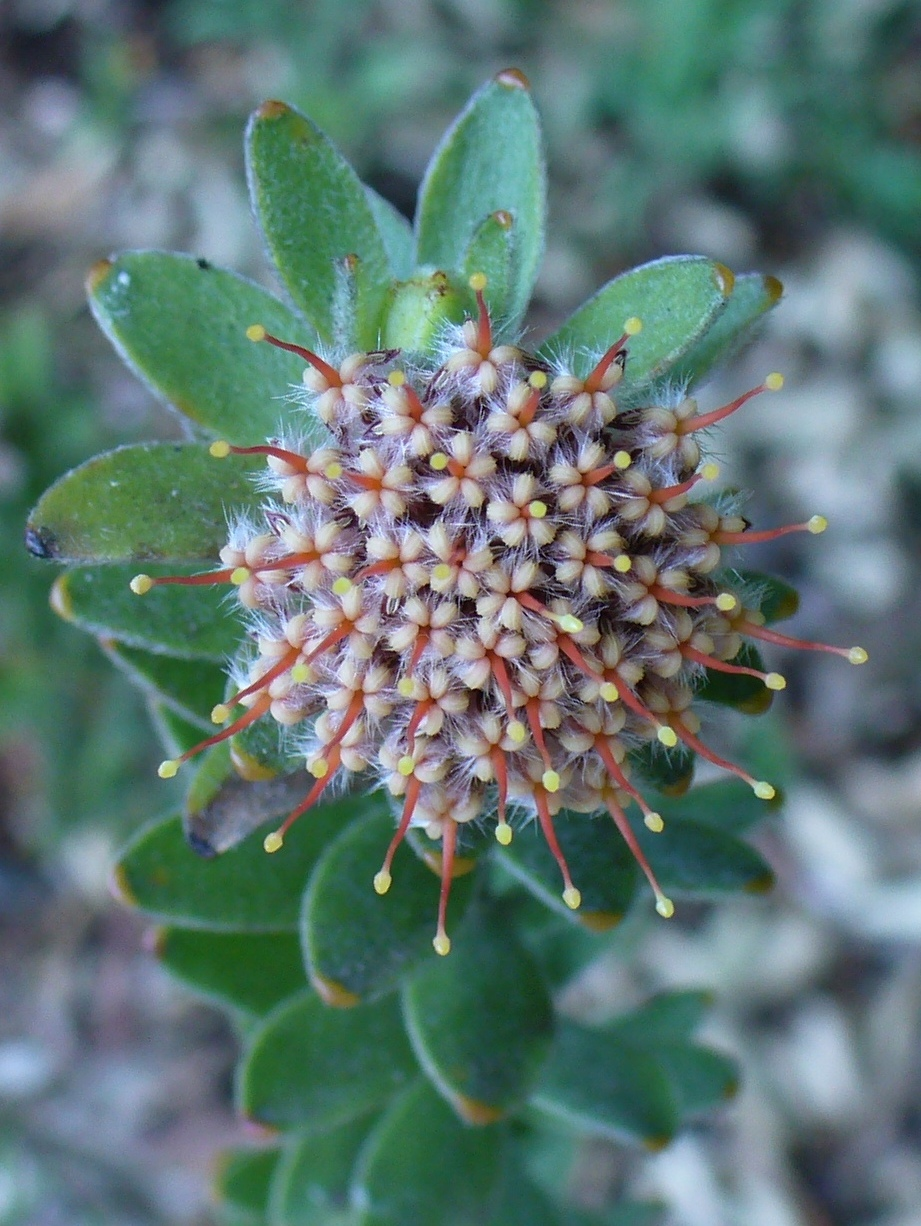

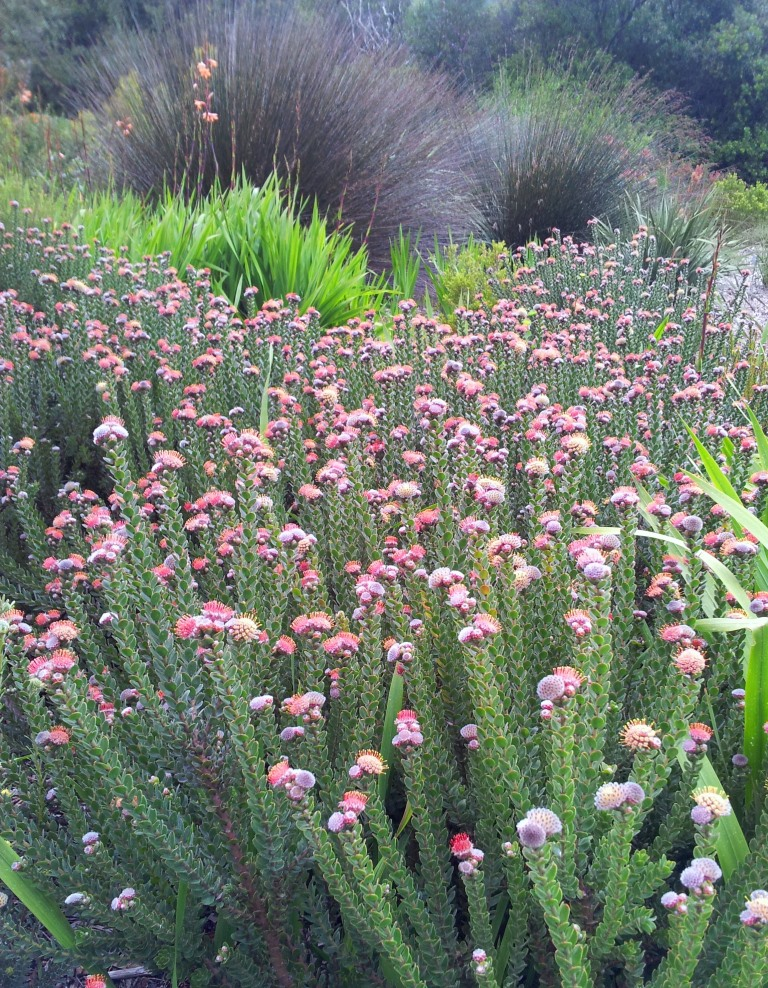

Conservation status
- Least Concern (IUCN 3.1)

Scientific classification
- Kingdom: Plantae
- Clade: Embryophytes
- Clade: Tracheophytes
- Clade: Angiosperms
- Clade: Eudicots
- Order: Proteales
- Family: Proteaceae
- Genus: Leucospermum
- Species: L. truncatulum

Binomial name
- Leucospermum truncatulum (Salisb. ex Knight) Rourke (1967)

Synonyms
- Leucadendrum truncatulum Knight (1809); Leucospermum buxifolium, Protea buxifolia, Leucadendron buxifolium; Protea villosa; Leucospermum buxifolium forma epacridea, Leucospermum epacrideum

= Leucospermum truncatulum =

Species of plant native to South Africa

Leucospermum truncatulum is a slender, upright, evergreen, hardly branching shrub of up to 2 m (6 ft) high, with felty inverted egg-shaped to oval, leaves with entire margins of 1–2½ cm (0.4–1.0 in) long and ½–1 cm (0.2–0.4 in) wide. It has small globe-shaped, at first yellow, later pinkish flower heads of 1½–2 cm (0.6-0.8 in) in diameter, without a stalk, usually crowded with two to eight together near the end of the stems. It is known as oval-leaf pincushion in English, and patrysbos or kleinkopspeldekussing in Afrikaans. It is an endemic species of the south of the Western Cape province of South Africa, and flowers between August and December.

== Description ==
The oval-leaf pincushion is a slender, stiffly upright and very sparsely branching evergreen shrublet mostly 1–1½ m, occasionally up to 2 m (6 ft) high, with a single basal stem. The flowering stems are slender, 3–4 mm (0.12–0.16 in) in diameter, densely set with soft hairs. The leaves are small for a Leucospermum species, rounded egg-shaped to oval with entire margins, 1–2½ cm (0.4–1.0 in) long and ½–1 cm (0.2–0.4 in) wide, densely overlapping, covered with fine silky hairs.

The flower heads are globe-shaped, 1½–2 cm (0.6-0.8 in) in diameter, without a stalk, usually crowded with two to eight together near the end of the stems. The common base of the flowers in the same head is flat and 4–5 mm in diameter. The bracts subtending the flower head are arranged in three or four whorls, each broadly lance-shaped to oval, with a pointy or blunt tip, 5–7 mm (0.20–0.28 in) long and 2–5 mm (0.08–0.20 in) wide, papery in consistency and with a thin tuft of long straight hair at its tip, with a regular row of straight hairs along the margin but otherwise without hairs.

The bracts subtending the individual flowers are lance-shaped with a pointy tip, about 6 mm (0.24 in) long and 2 mm (0.08 in) wide, densely covered in woolly hairs. The perianth is initially yellow in colour but changes to pinkish over time, is 8–10 mm (0.32–0.40 in) long. When the flower opens, a hairless and slightly quadrangular tube of 4 mm (0.16 in) long remains, while the four lobes curl back when the flower opens, which are covered in soft hairs. The highest part consists of oval lobes of about 2 mm (0.08 in) long, with very few rough hairs. The styles are 1.4–1.6 cm (0.56–0.64 in) long, straight to a bit curved towards the center of the head, tapering towards the tip, at first yellow but aging to crimson. The thicked part at the tip called pollen presenter is abruptly cone- to egg-shaped with a pointy tip and about 1.0 mm (0.04 in) long, with a groove that functions as the stigma central at the very tip. The ovary is subtended by four opaque, threadlike scales with a blunt tip of about 1½ mm (0.06 in) long. The flowers of Leucospermum truncatulum have a slight scent.

=== Differences with related species ===
The oval-leaf pincushion differs from its nearest relatives by its small, entire, densely overlapping, egg-shaped leaves of 1–2½ cm long, the papery involucral bracts that form a conspicuous involucre and the cone- to egg-shaped pollen presenter.

== Taxonomy ==
The oval-leaf pincushion was first described in 1809 by Richard Anthony Salisbury in a book by Joseph Knight titled On the cultivation of the plants belonging to the natural order of Proteeae, calling it Leucadendrum truncatulum. It is assumed that Salisbury had seen a draft of a paper called On the natural order of plants called Proteaceae that Robert Brown was to publish in 1810. Brown however, called the species Leucospermum buxifolium. In 1900, the genus name Leucospermum was conserved over Leucadendrum. The French botanist Jean Poiret assigned Brown's species to the genus Protea in 1816, making the combination P. buxifolia. Otto Kuntze moved buxifolium in 1891 to Leucadendron. Carl Ludwig Willdenow gave this pincushion the name Protea villosa given without a proper description in a book by Kurt Polycarp Joachim Sprengel in 1825. Michel Gandoger distinguished Leucospermum buxifolium forma epacridea in 1901, which he raised together with Hans Schinz to Leucospermum epacrideum in 1913. In 1967, John Patrick Rourke created the new combination Leucospermum truncatulum, combining the conserved genus name Leucospermum R.Br with the earliest valid species epithed truncatulum Salisb. ex Knight. He regarded L. epacrideum as identical.

Leucospermum truncatulum has been assigned to the section Diastelloidea or louse pincushions.

The name of this species, truncatulum, is Latin and means "somewhat cut-off", although it remains unclear to which part of the plant this refers. The synonym buxifolium means with leaves like Buxus. The name Leucospermum buxifolium is still used in the trade of ornamentals and cut flowers. The common name in Afrikaans, patrysbos, means "partridge bush", and may refer to francolins liking to eat the seeds, or because they are seen sheltering underneath the shrub during the hottest periods of the day.

== Distribution, habitat and ecology ==
The oval-leaf pincushion can be found from the eastern foothills of the Kogelberg Peak in the west, to the south along the Bot River, along the coast from Hermanus, almost reaching Cape Agulhas in the southeast of its range, north to Bredasdorp northwestwards via Caledon. Plants are mostly found in extensive stands. Across its range the average annual precipitation is between 650 and 1000 mm (25–40 in), most of which falls during the winter half year. The species prefers acidulous and nutrient-poor sands on east- and southward facing slopes from sea level to about 365 m (1200 ft) where grows in a dense sclerophyll vegetation further mainly consisting of other Proteaceae, Ericaceae and the grass-like Restionaceae.

The oval-leaf pincushion is pollinated by insects, including bees and flies. When the fruits are ripe about two months after flowering, they fall to the ground. Here they are gathered by ants who are attracted to a pale fleshy ant loaf (or elaiosome) and carry them to their underground nests where the ant loaf is eaten, but the seeds remain safely stored. This seed dispersal strategy is known as myrmecochory. After above ground the plants are killed by the wildfires that naturally occur in the Fynbos every decade or two, chemicals from the charred vegetation which percolate with the rainwater, the seeds germinate and revive the population. Seeds also need night temperatures of 4–10 °C (39–50 °F) and day temperatures of 15–20 °C (59–68 °F) to trigger germination, circumstances which are characteristic for autumn in its home range and signal the arrival of the copious winter rains.

== Conservation ==
Agricultural development has resulted in decreased populations of this species, and invasive alien Hakea and pines may in the future have a further impact. The species is not considered threatened however since most of the remaining locations are protected.
