= Erica gnaphaloides =

Scientific classification
- Kingdom: Plantae
- Clade: Tracheophytes
- Clade: Angiosperms
- Clade: Eudicots
- Clade: Asterids
- Order: Ericales
- Family: Ericaceae
- Genus: Erica
- Species: E. gnaphaloides

Binomial name
- Erica gnaphaloides L.

Synonyms
- Erica paniculata G.Lodd.; Erica tetrastigmata Bolus; Lamprotis gnaphalodes G.Don

Species of flowering plant

Erica gnaphaloides is a plant belonging to the genus Erica and forming part of the fynbos. The species is endemic to the Western Cape and occurs from the Cape Peninsula to Franschhoek, Kogelberg and Cape Agulhas.
