= Disa brevipetala =

Scientific classification
- Kingdom: Plantae
- Clade: Embryophytes
- Clade: Tracheophytes
- Clade: Angiosperms
- Clade: Monocots
- Order: Asparagales
- Family: Orchidaceae
- Subfamily: Orchidoideae
- Genus: Disa
- Species: D. brevipetala

Binomial name
- Disa brevipetala H.P.Linder

Species of flowering plant

Disa brevipetala was a perennial plant and geophyte belonging to the genus Disa. The plant was endemic to the Western Cape and occurred at Kleinmond but is now considered extinct.
