= Erica cincta =

Scientific classification
- Kingdom: Plantae
- Clade: Tracheophytes
- Clade: Angiosperms
- Clade: Eudicots
- Clade: Asterids
- Order: Ericales
- Family: Ericaceae
- Genus: Erica
- Species: E. cincta

Binomial name
- Erica cincta L.Bolus

Species of flowering plant

Erica cincta is a plant belonging to the genus Erica and forming part of the fynbos. The species is endemic to the Western Cape and occurs on the summit of the Kogelberg. The habitat is not threatened but the plant is critically rare.
