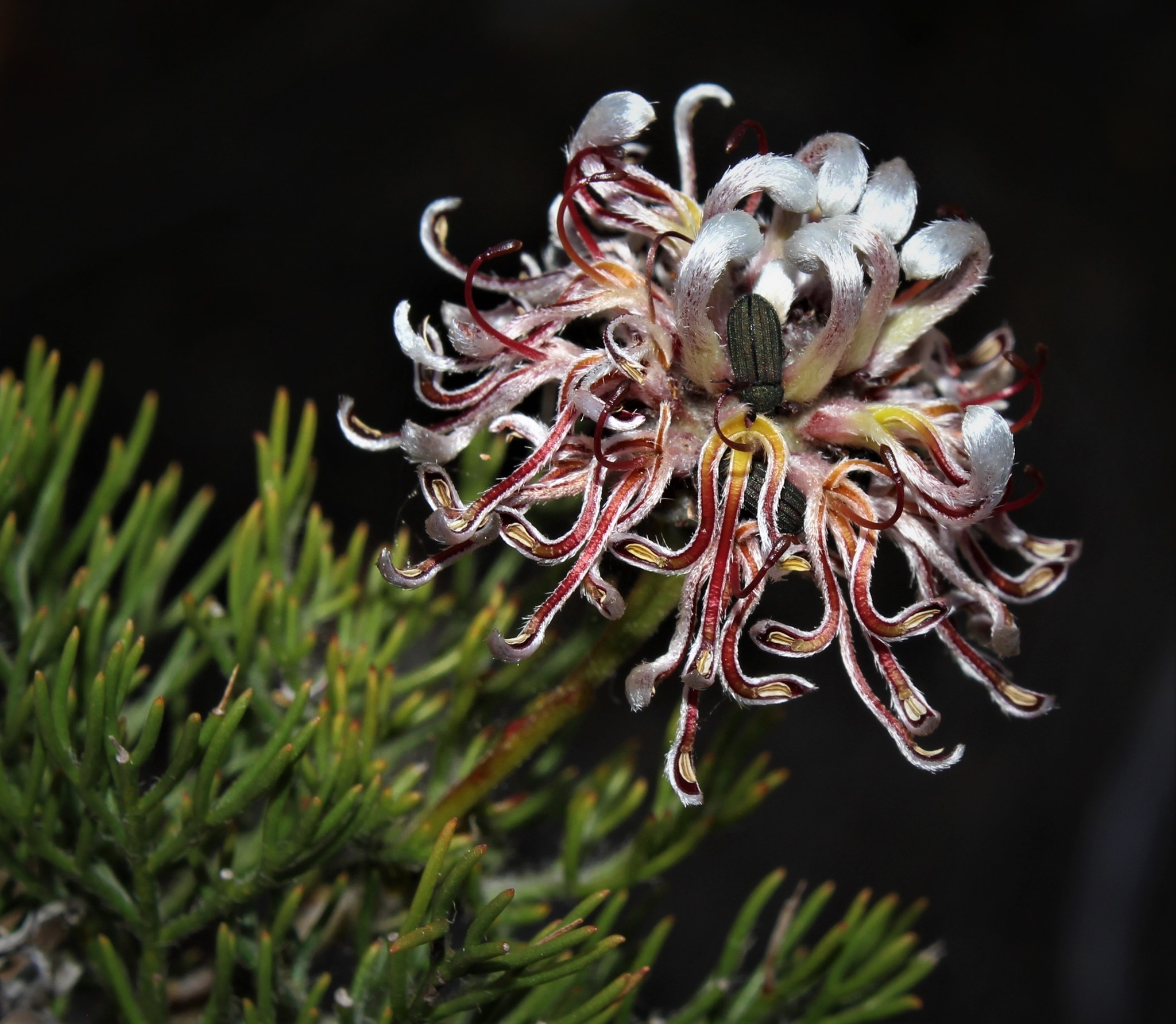

Conservation status
- Near Threatened (IUCN 3.1)

Scientific classification
- Kingdom: Plantae
- Clade: Tracheophytes
- Clade: Angiosperms
- Clade: Eudicots
- Order: Proteales
- Family: Proteaceae
- Genus: Serruria
- Species: S. gremialis

Binomial name
- Serruria gremialis Rourke

= Serruria gremialis =

Species of plant

Serruria gremialis, the Riviersonderend spiderhead, is a flowering shrub that belongs to the genus Serruria and forms part of the fynbos. The plant is endemic to the Western Cape and occurs in the Riviersonderend and Stettynkloof mountains. The shrub is predominantly a creeper with stems growing up to 1.0 m in length and flowering from July to February.

The plant's roots sprout again after a fire. Two months after flowering, the fruit falls and ants disperse the seeds. They store the seeds in their nests. The plant is unisexual. Pollination takes place through the action of insects. The plant grows on the northern slopes in sandstone soil at elevations of 270 – 760 m.

== Habitat and ecology ==
The Riviersonderend spiderhead is found on north-facing sandstone slopes in fynbos habitat (270-760 m elevation), including Kogelberg Sandstone Fynbos.

The plant survives veldfires from an underground rootstock. Seeds are pollinated by insects and are dispersed underground by native ants (the invasive Argentine ant competes with native ants but doesn't take the seeds underground, leading to dwindling seed reserves).

== Conservation status ==
The Riviersonderend spiderhead has been classified as near threatened due to habitat loss and degradation. The overall population is projected to lose 21-28% by 2119, in less than 3 generations (a generation is 50-100 years).

== Sources ==
- REDLIST Sanbi
- Biodiversityexplorer
- Protea Atlas
- Plants of the World Online
