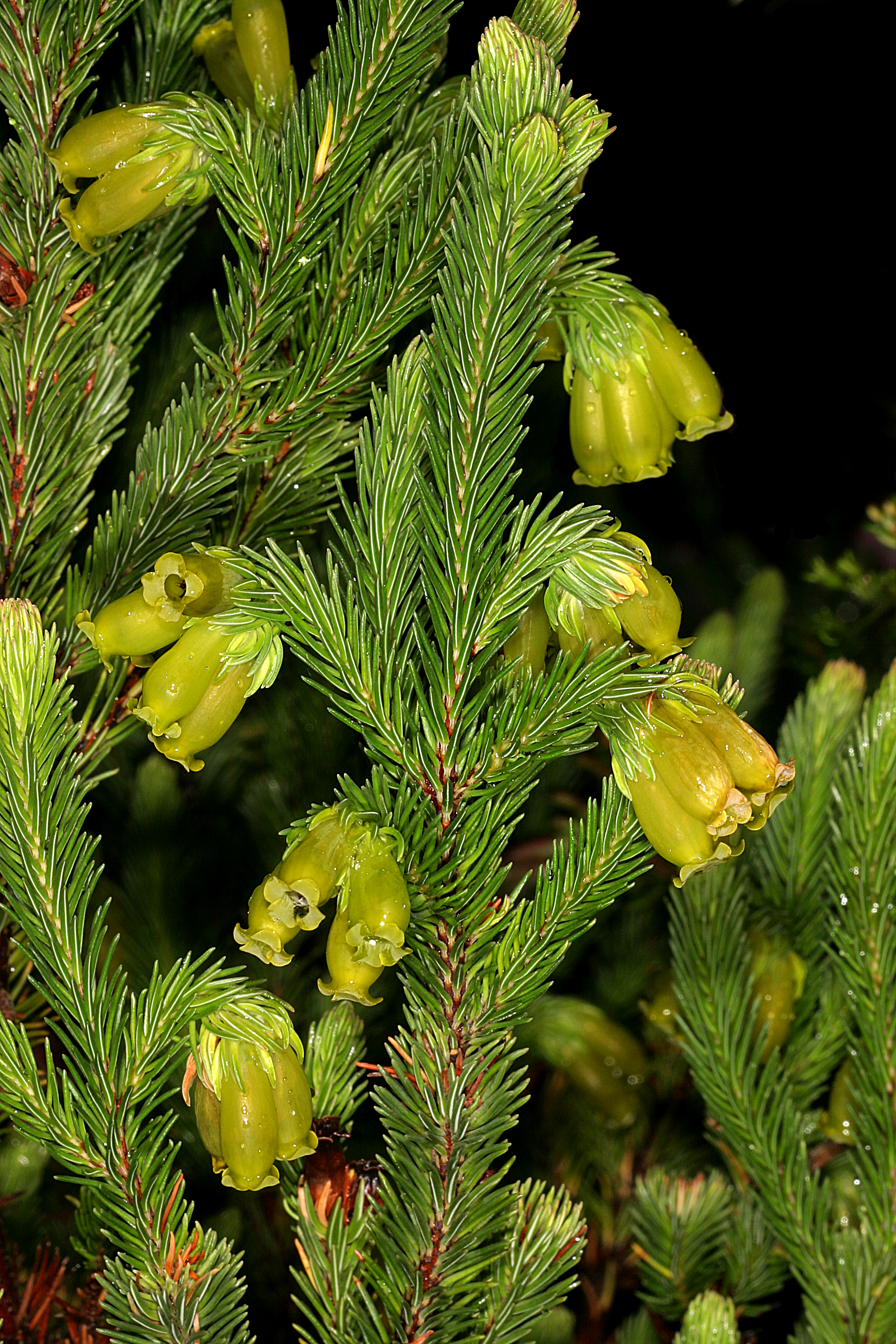

Scientific classification
- Kingdom: Plantae
- Clade: Tracheophytes
- Clade: Angiosperms
- Clade: Eudicots
- Clade: Asterids
- Order: Ericales
- Family: Ericaceae
- Genus: Erica
- Species: E. foliacea

Binomial name
- Erica foliacea Andrews

Synonyms
- Ericoides foliaceum (Andrews) Kuntze; Syringodea foliosa G.Don

= Erica foliacea =

Species of flowering plant

Erica foliacea is a plant belonging to the genus Erica and forming part of the fynbos. The species is endemic to the Western Cape and occurs in the mountains between Betty's Bay and Bot River. The plant's habitat is threatened by invasive plants.
