= Erica pageana =

Scientific classification
- Kingdom: Plantae
- Clade: Tracheophytes
- Clade: Angiosperms
- Clade: Eudicots
- Clade: Asterids
- Order: Ericales
- Family: Ericaceae
- Genus: Erica
- Species: E. pageana

Binomial name
- Erica pageana L.Bolus

Species of flowering plant

Erica pageana is a plant belonging to the genus Erica and is part of the fynbos. The species is endemic to the Western Cape. It is also found in the Kogelberg Nature Reserve. The plant is considered rare.
