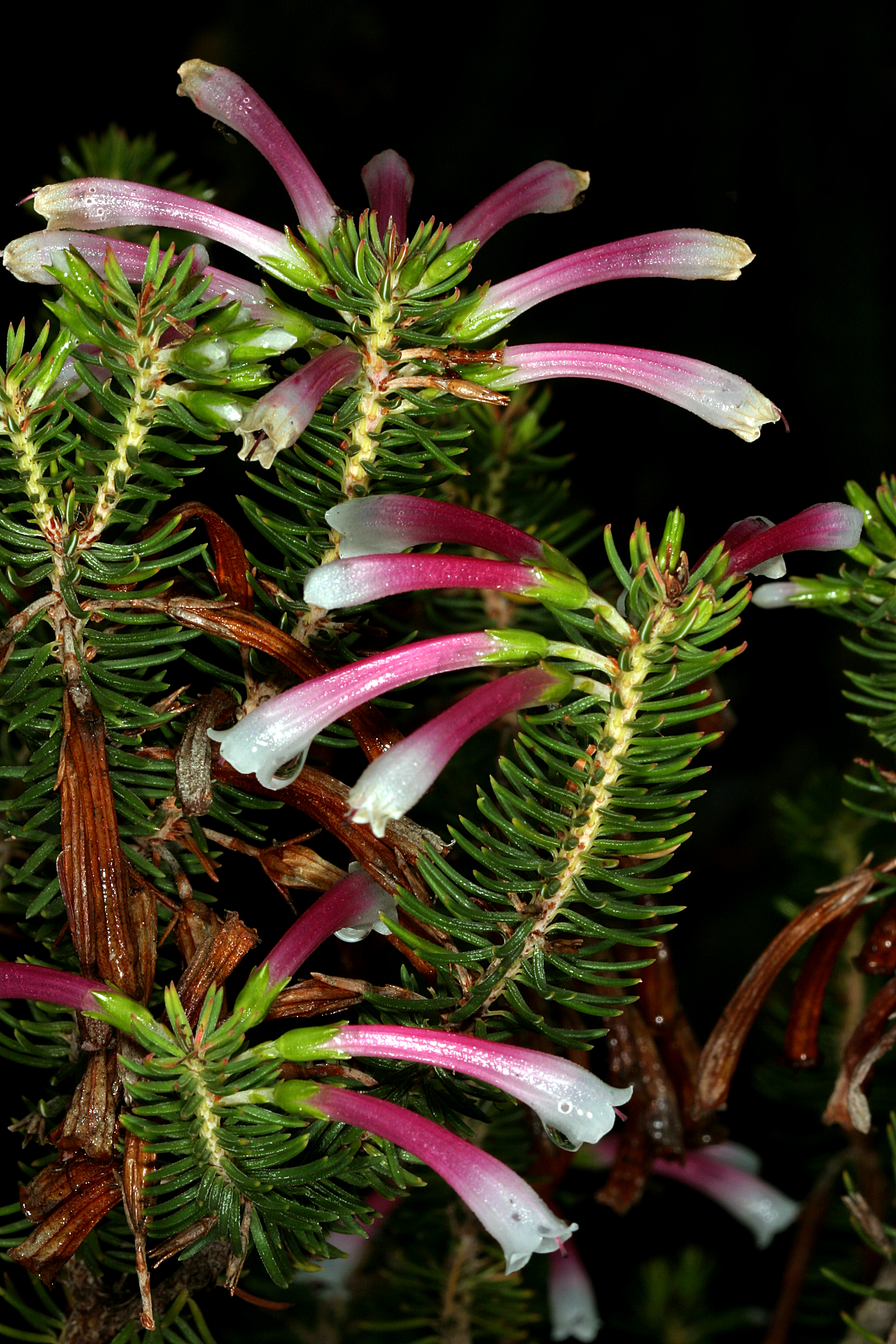

Scientific classification
- Kingdom: Plantae
- Clade: Tracheophytes
- Clade: Angiosperms
- Clade: Eudicots
- Clade: Asterids
- Order: Ericales
- Family: Ericaceae
- Genus: Erica
- Species: E. thomae

Binomial name
- Erica thomae L.Bolus

Synonyms
- Erica porteri Compton; Erica tenax L.Bolus

= Erica thomae =

Species of flowering plant

Erica thomae, the flypaper heath, is a plant belonging to the genus Erica and is part of the fynbos. The species is endemic to the Western Cape and occurs in the Kogelberg. The plant is considered rare and the habitat is not threatened.
