= Erica cunoniensis =

Scientific classification
- Kingdom: Plantae
- Clade: Tracheophytes
- Clade: Angiosperms
- Clade: Eudicots
- Clade: Asterids
- Order: Ericales
- Family: Ericaceae
- Genus: Erica
- Species: E. cunoniensis

Binomial name
- Erica cunoniensis E.G.H.Oliv.

Species of flowering plant

Erica cunoniensis is a plant belonging to the genus Erica and forming part of the fynbos. The species is endemic to the Western Cape and occurs on Buffelstalberg in the Kogelberg Nature Reserves. There are only 200 plants left and although the habitat is protected, wildfires remain a major risk.

After being thought to be extinct, the species was rediscovered in the Kogelberg Nature Reserve in September 2025. This is the first time the species has been seen in almost 40 years.
