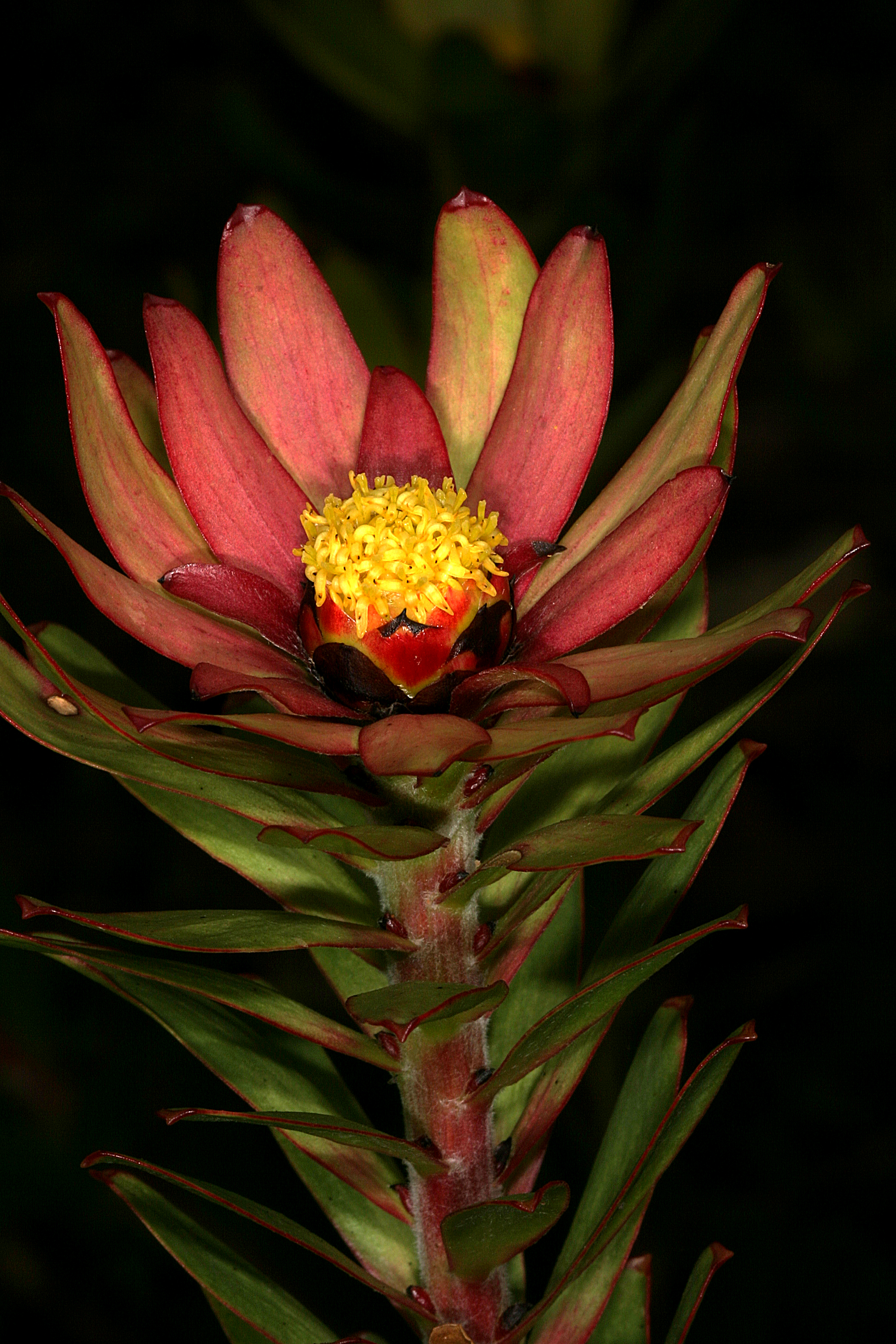

Conservation status
- Near Threatened (IUCN 3.1)

Scientific classification
- Kingdom: Plantae
- Clade: Tracheophytes
- Clade: Angiosperms
- Clade: Eudicots
- Order: Proteales
- Family: Proteaceae
- Genus: Leucadendron
- Species: L. sessile

Binomial name
- Leucadendron sessile R.Br.

= Leucadendron sessile =

Species of plant

Leucadendron sessile, the western sunbush, is a flower-bearing shrub belonging to the genus Leucadendron and forms part of the fynbos. The plant is native to the Western Cape, South Africa.

== Description ==
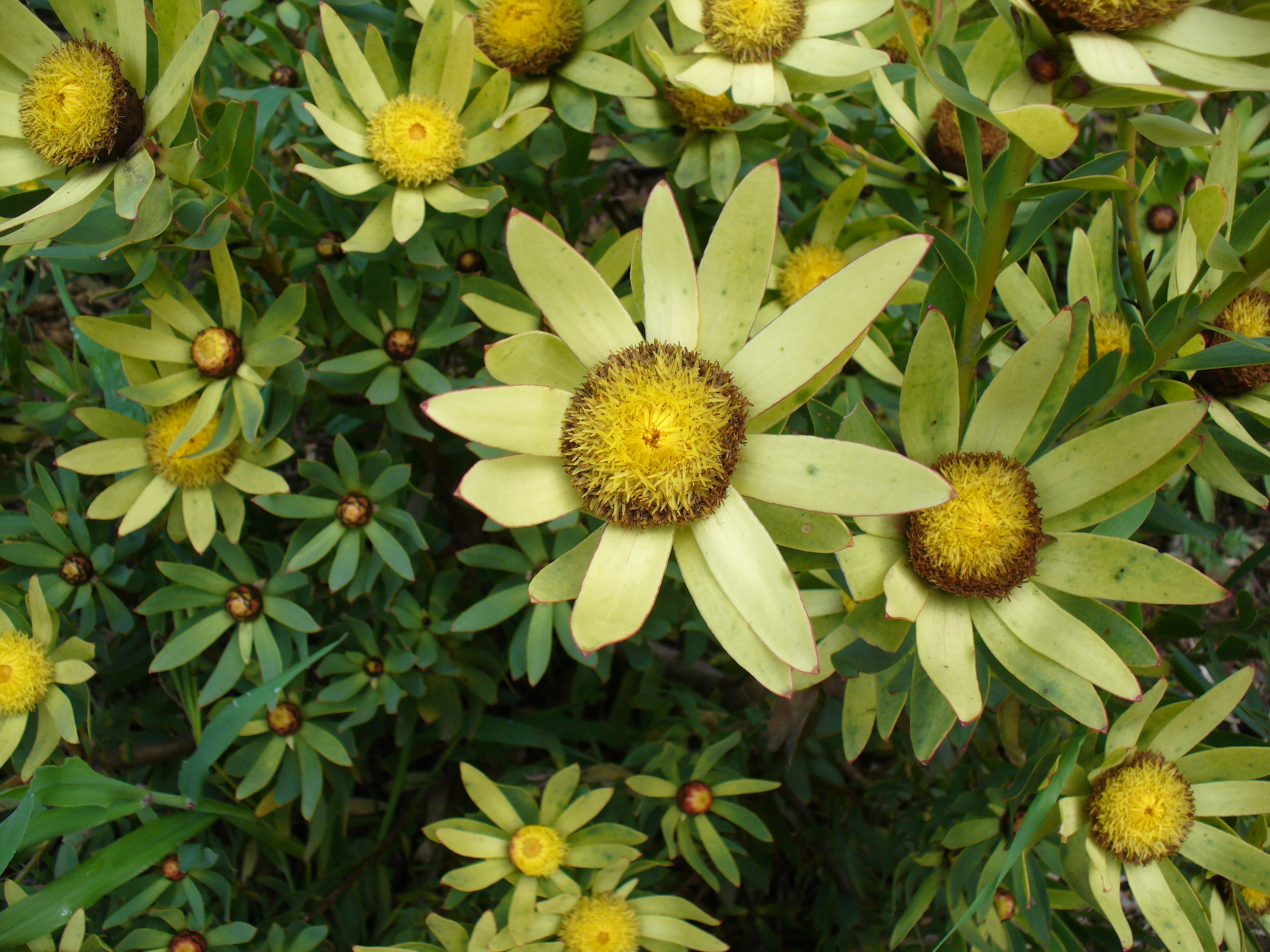

The shrub grows 1.5 m (4.9 ft) tall and bears flowers in July to August. Fire destroys the plant but the seeds survive. The seeds are stored in a toll on the female plant and are released after two months when they are ripe and fall to the ground. Rodents disperse the seeds. The plant is unisexual and there are male and female plants. Small towers do the pollination.

In Afrikaans, it is known as Kleinkoprosettolbos.

== Distribution with habitat ==
The plant occurs in the Witsenberg, Elandskloof to Slanghoek Mountains, Hottentots Holland Mountains from Jonkershoek to Kogelberg. The plant grows mainly in granite clay soil on mountain slopes at elevations of 10–600 m (33–1,969 ft).

== Gallery ==
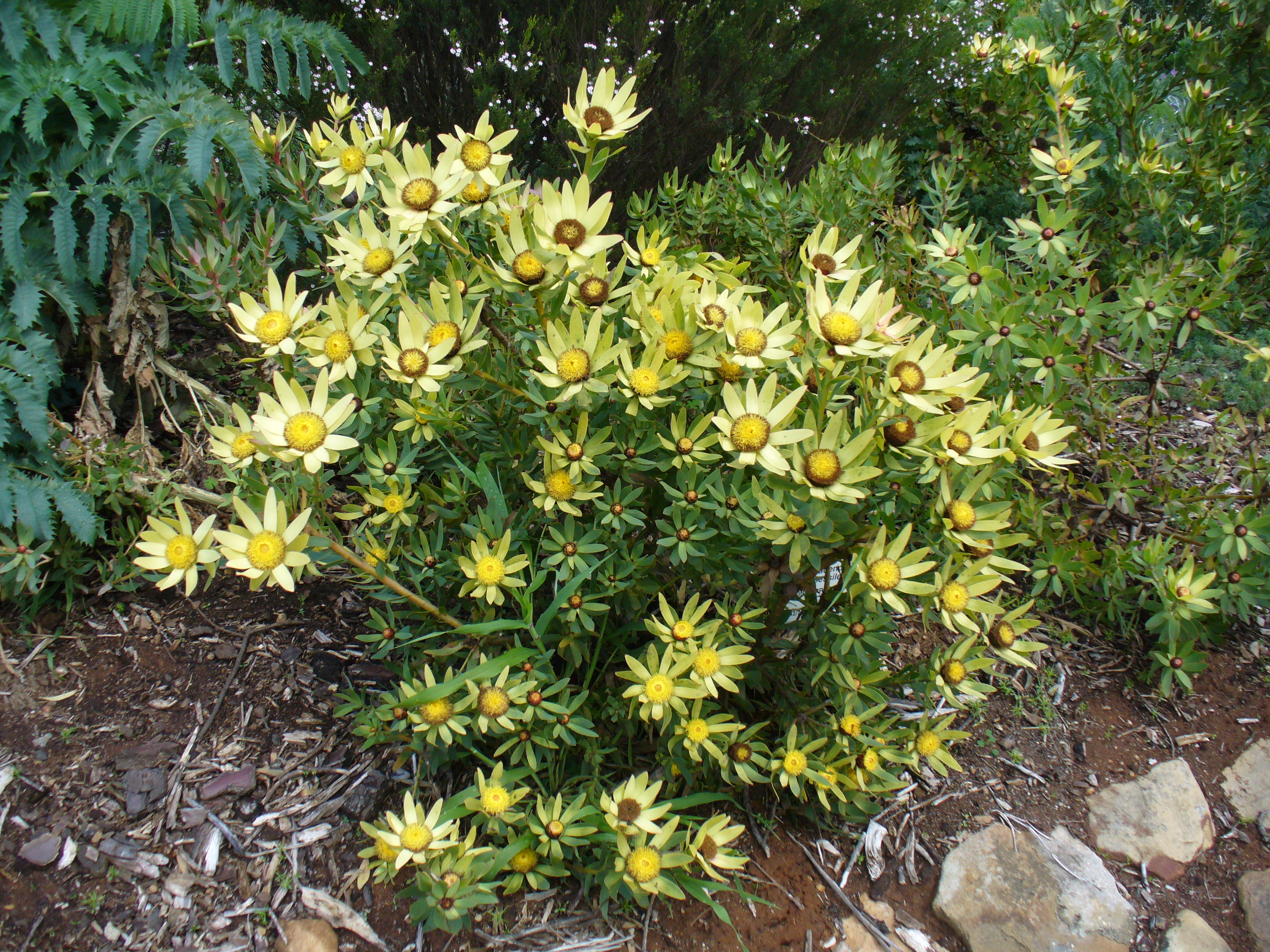

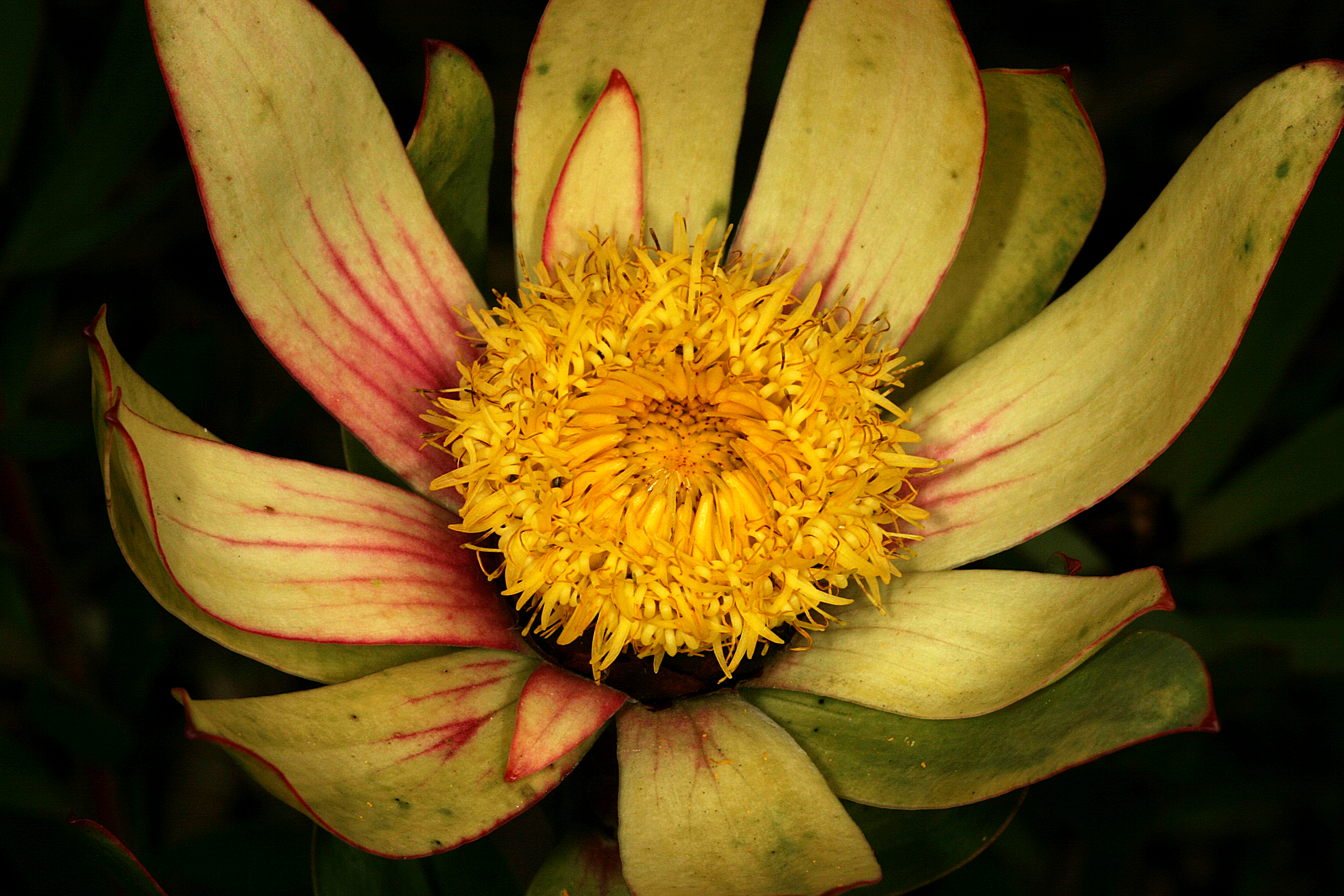

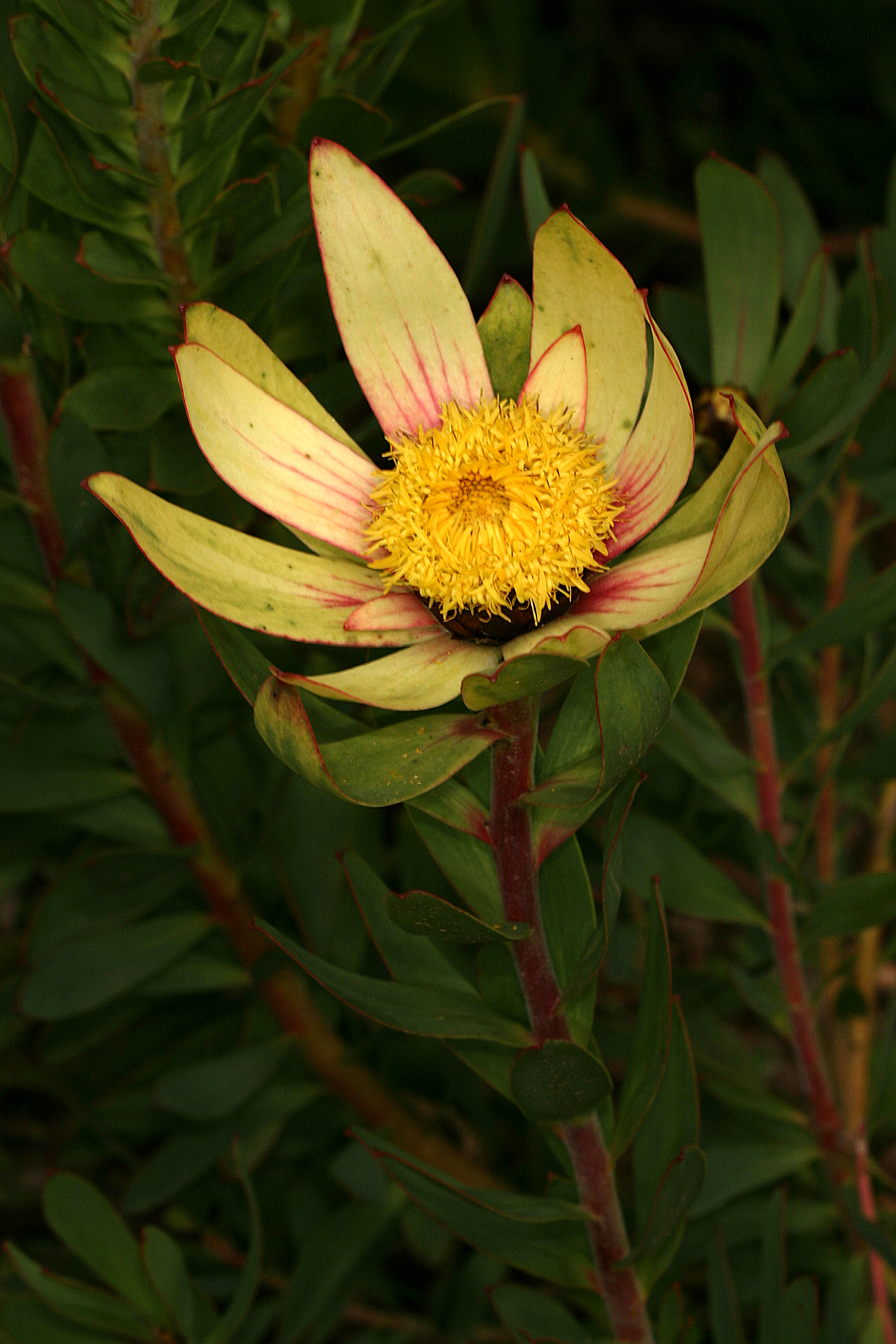

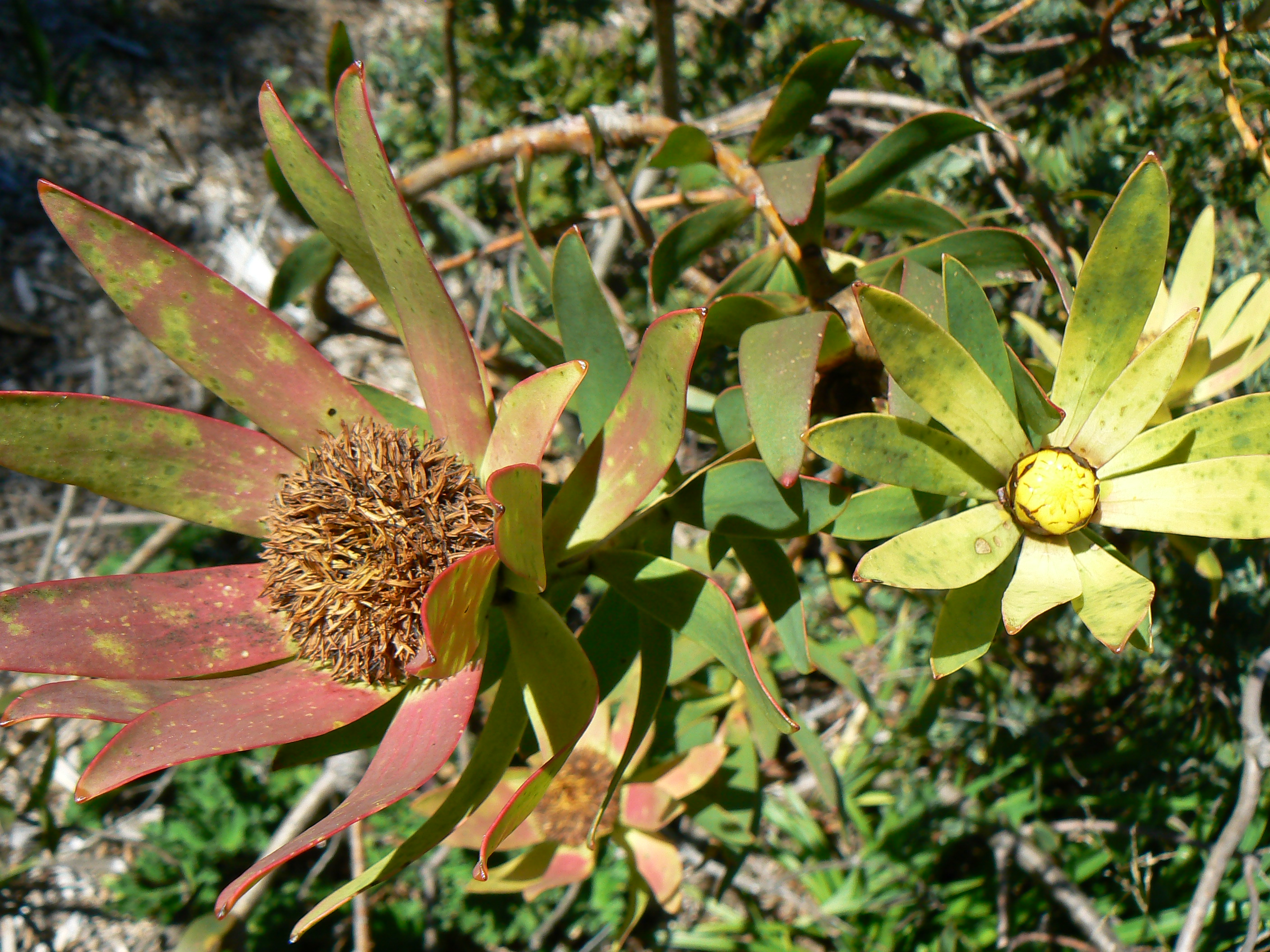

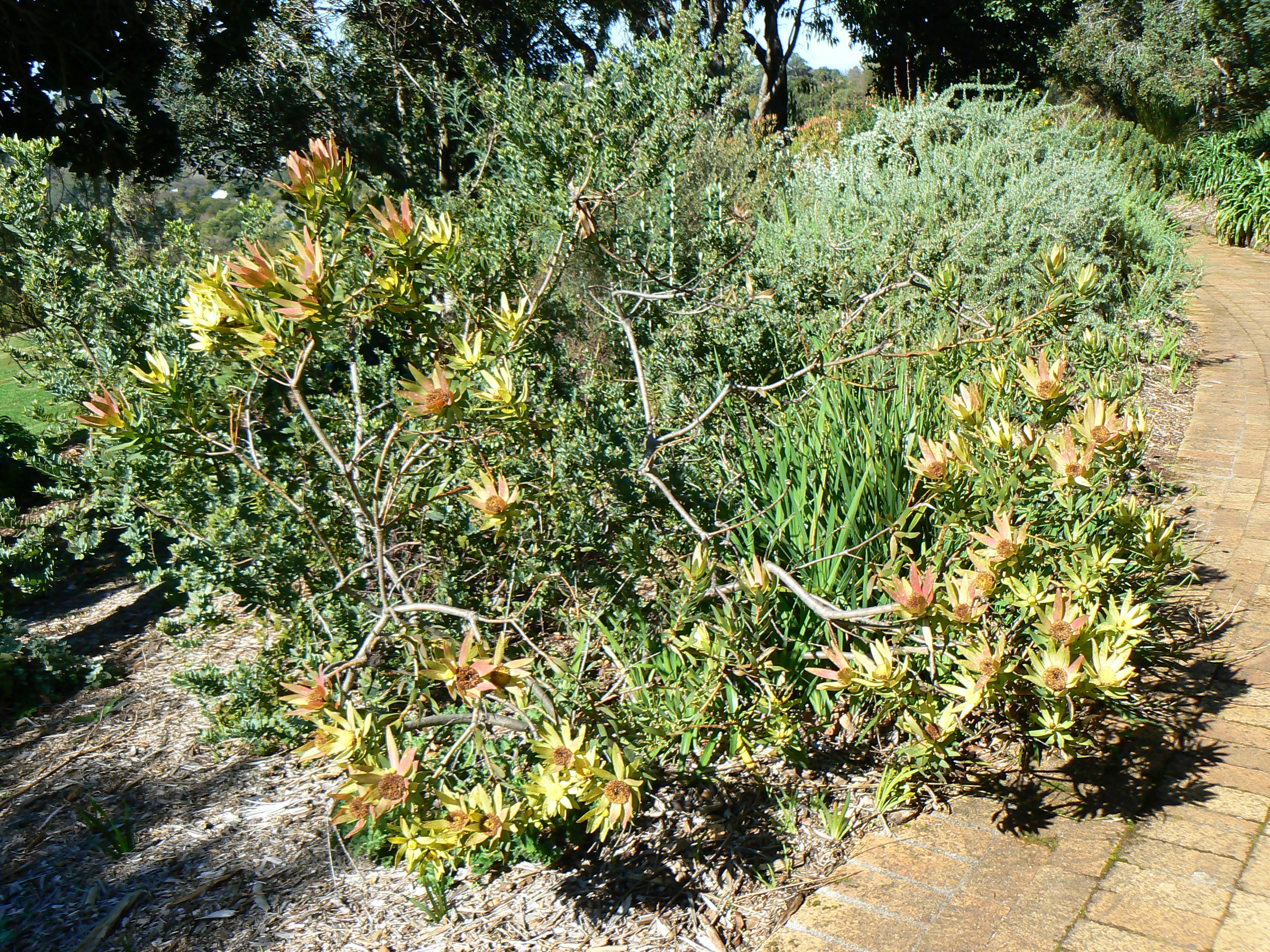
