= Kogelberg Sandstone Fynbos =

Vegetation type endemic to the far south of the Western Cape, South Africa

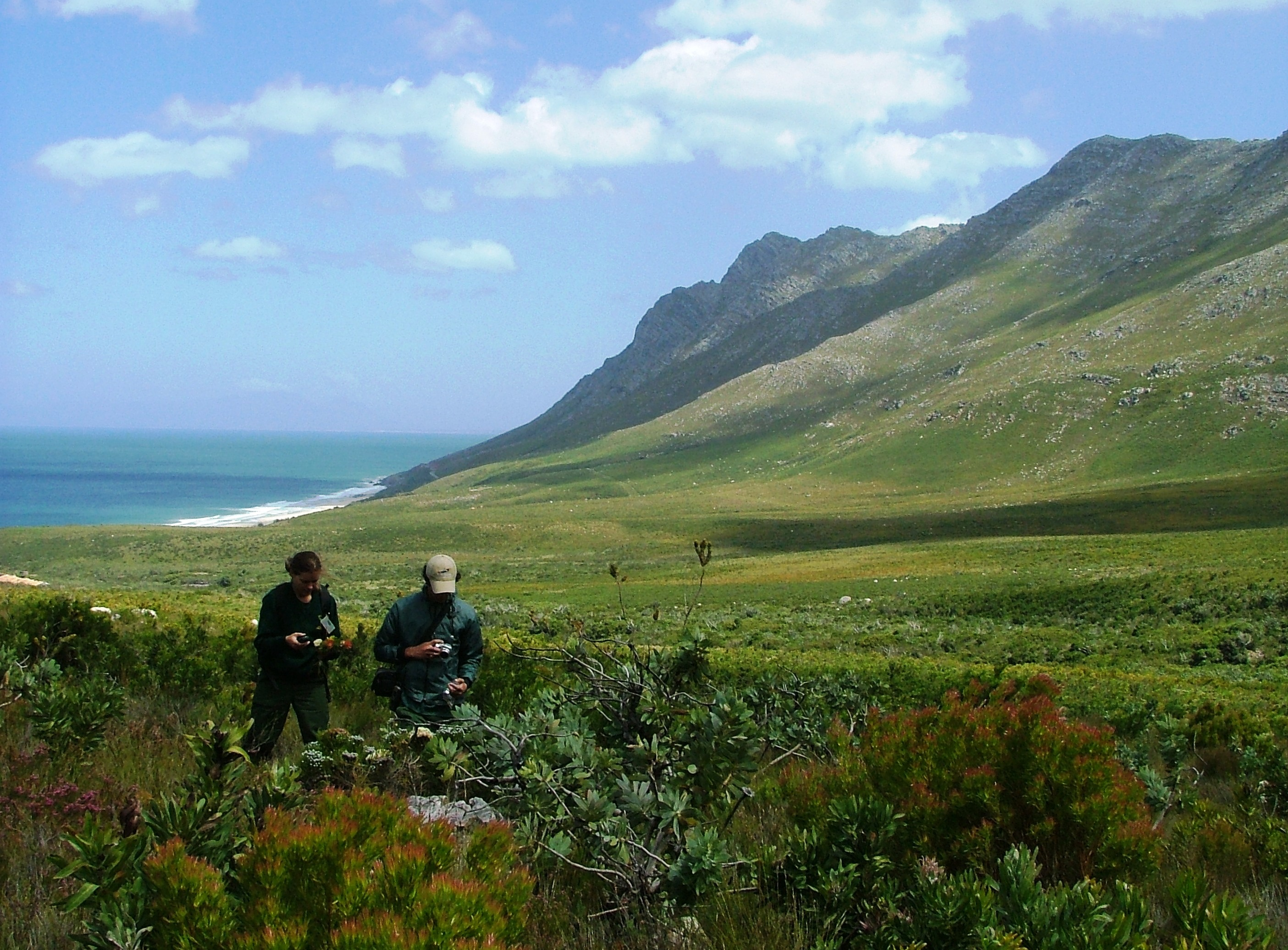
Kogelberg Sandstone Fynbos in the Kogelberg Biosphere Reserve

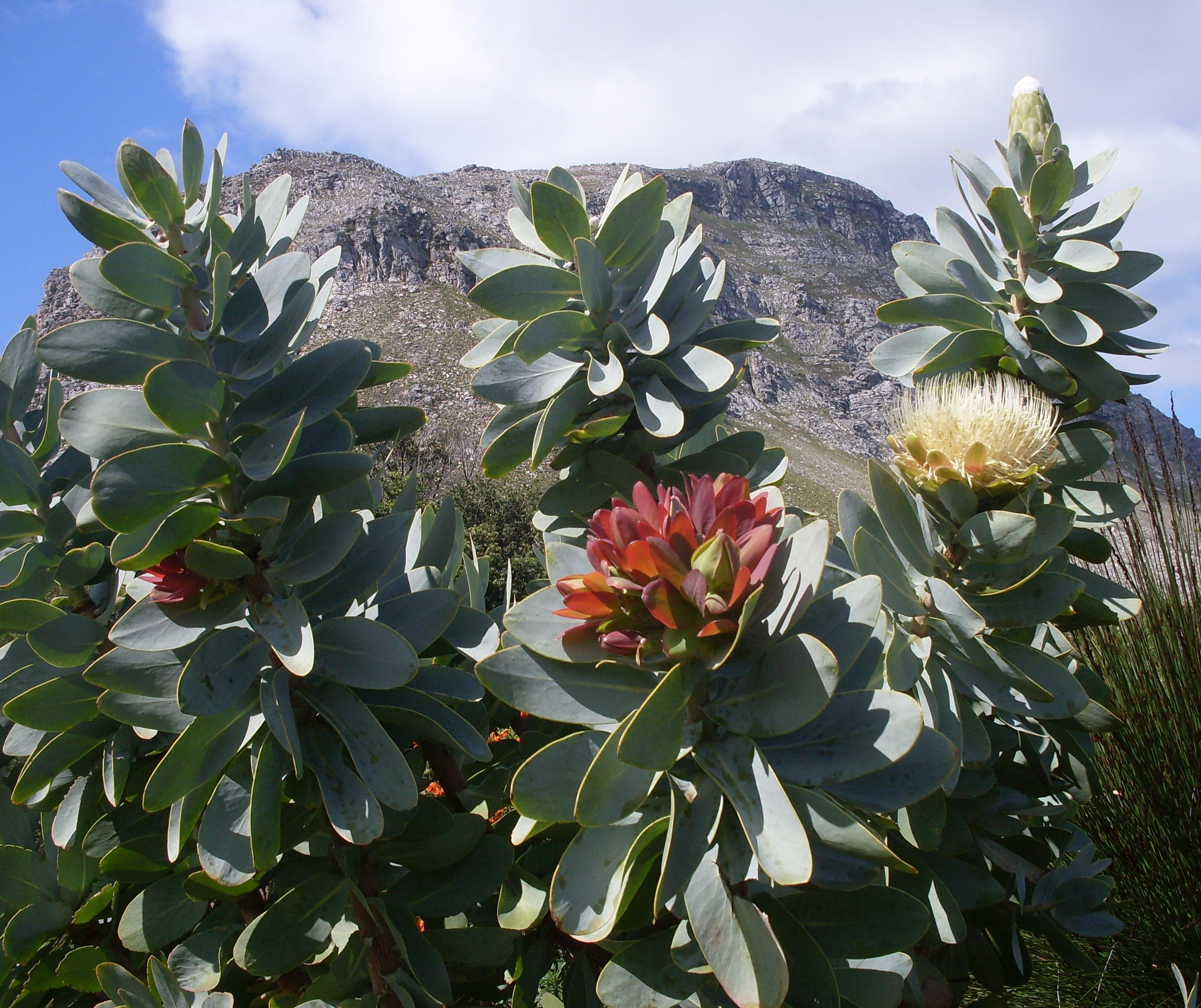
A "Waboom" tree (Protea nitida) growing in Kogelberg Sandstone Fynbos

Kogelberg Sandstone Fynbos is a critically endangered vegetation type occurring in the far south of the Western Cape, South Africa.

This type of mountain fynbos contains an extremely high number of threatened species and a great number of the plants that occur here can be found nowhere else on earth. It naturally occurs from the eastern outskirts of Cape Town, eastwards through the Kogelberg and Hottentots-Holland mountains, as far as Kleinmond, and it is conserved within the Kogelberg Biosphere Reserve.

This particular vegetation grows on rough, mountainous, sandstone terrain. It was extensively planted with commercial timber plantations of invasive pine trees. These trees pose a major threat to the unique and endangered biodiversity and have yet to be completely removed.

== See also ==
- Biodiversity of Cape Town
- Cape Floristic Region
- Kogelberg Mountains
- Kogelberg Nature Reserve
- Peninsula Sandstone Fynbos
- Category:Fynbos - habitats and species.
