= Arabella Country Estate =

Residential estate in South Africa

- Location within South Africa Location within Western Cape
- 34.3158°S 19.1310°E

Club information
- Location: Kleinmond (Overstrand Local Municipality), Western Cape, South Africa
- Operator: African Pride
- Tota holes: 18
- Tournaments: Nelson Mandela Invitational, Vodacom Origins of Golf Tour
- Website: http://arabellacountryestate.co.za/
- Designed by: Peter Matkovich
- Par: 72

Arabella Country Estate, known simply as Arabella, is a residential estate with a golf course and a 5 star hotel located near the coastal towns of Kleinmond and Hermanus in the Western Cape, South Africa . In 2014, the Peter Matkovich designed golf course was rated in the top-5 in the country by Golf Digest South Africa.

Arabella has hosted several professional golf tournaments, including the Nelson Mandela Invitational from 2000 to 2008. It has also been home to the Western Cape leg of the Vodacom Origins of Golf Tour, part of the Winter schedule of events on the Sunshine Tour.
