= Fisherhaven =

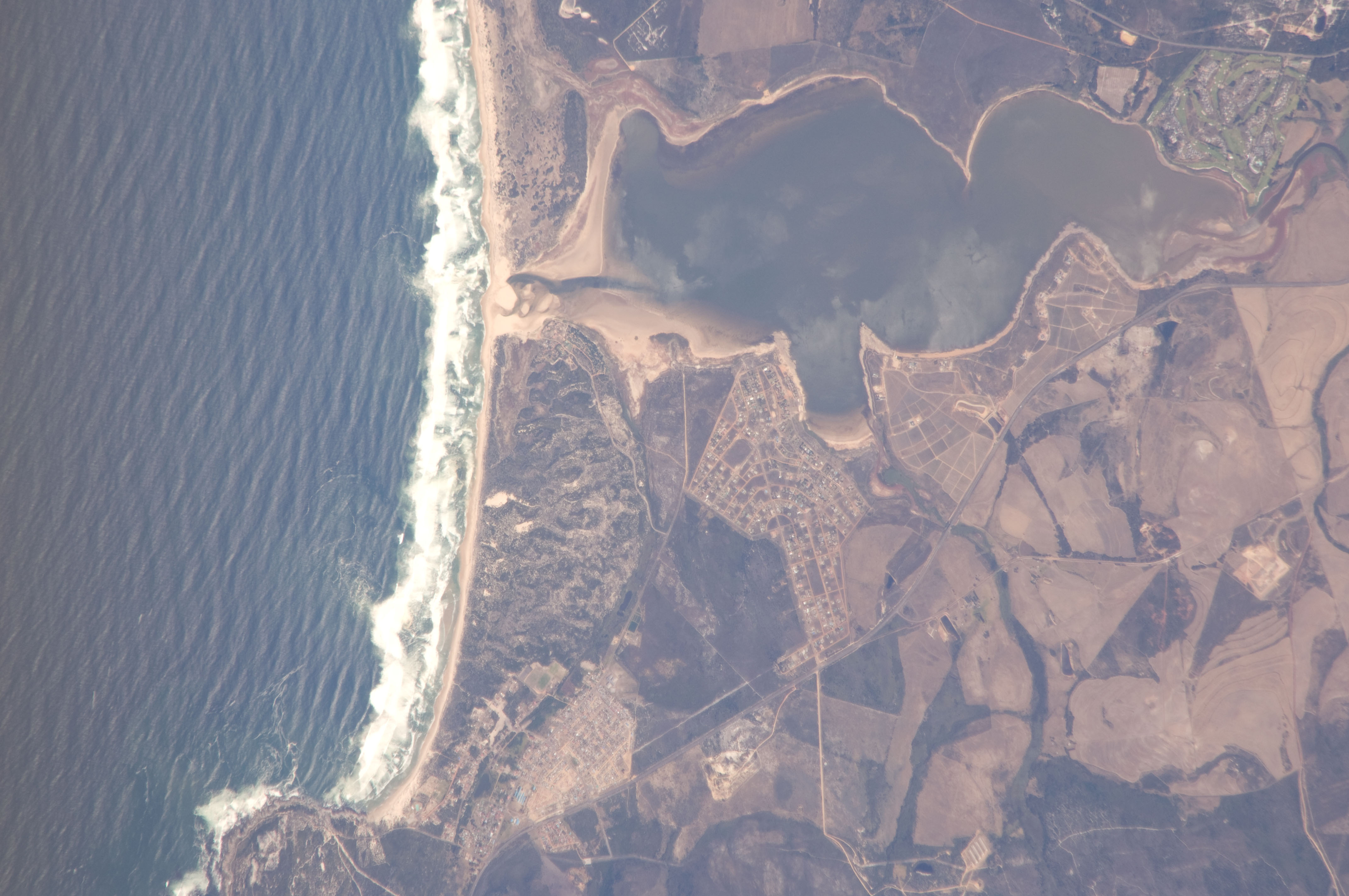
- View of Fisherhaven from space.

- Location within Western Cape Location within South Africa
- Coordinates: 34°21′39″S 19°07′47″E
- Country: South Africa
- Province: Western Cape
- District: Overberg
- Municipality: Overstrand
- Postal code: 7200

Fisherhaven is a suburb of the whale watching town of Hermanus in the Western Cape, South Africa. It is situated next to the Bot River Lagoon, about 14 km from Hermanus center and about 14 km from Arabella Country Estate and Golf course. There is an abundance of indigenous fauna and flora.

== Tourism ==
Fisherhaven is a popular birdwatching and holiday destination. Over 120 bird species can be found in the surrounding area. Many water sports can be done on the lagoon including waterski, powerboating, wakeboarding, kiteboarding, windsurfing, kayaking, sailing and fishing.

== Wildlife ==
A herd of wild horses are known to roam free in the marshlands, next to the Rooisand Nature Reserve. There is a group of between 10 and 12 Fisherhaven horses which have made their home in and around the village, much to the delight of visitors and residents. The rest (numbering about 26) at Rooisand and the Bot-Kleinmond estuary marshes. They are believed to be South Africa's only herd of wild horses in a wetland habitat.

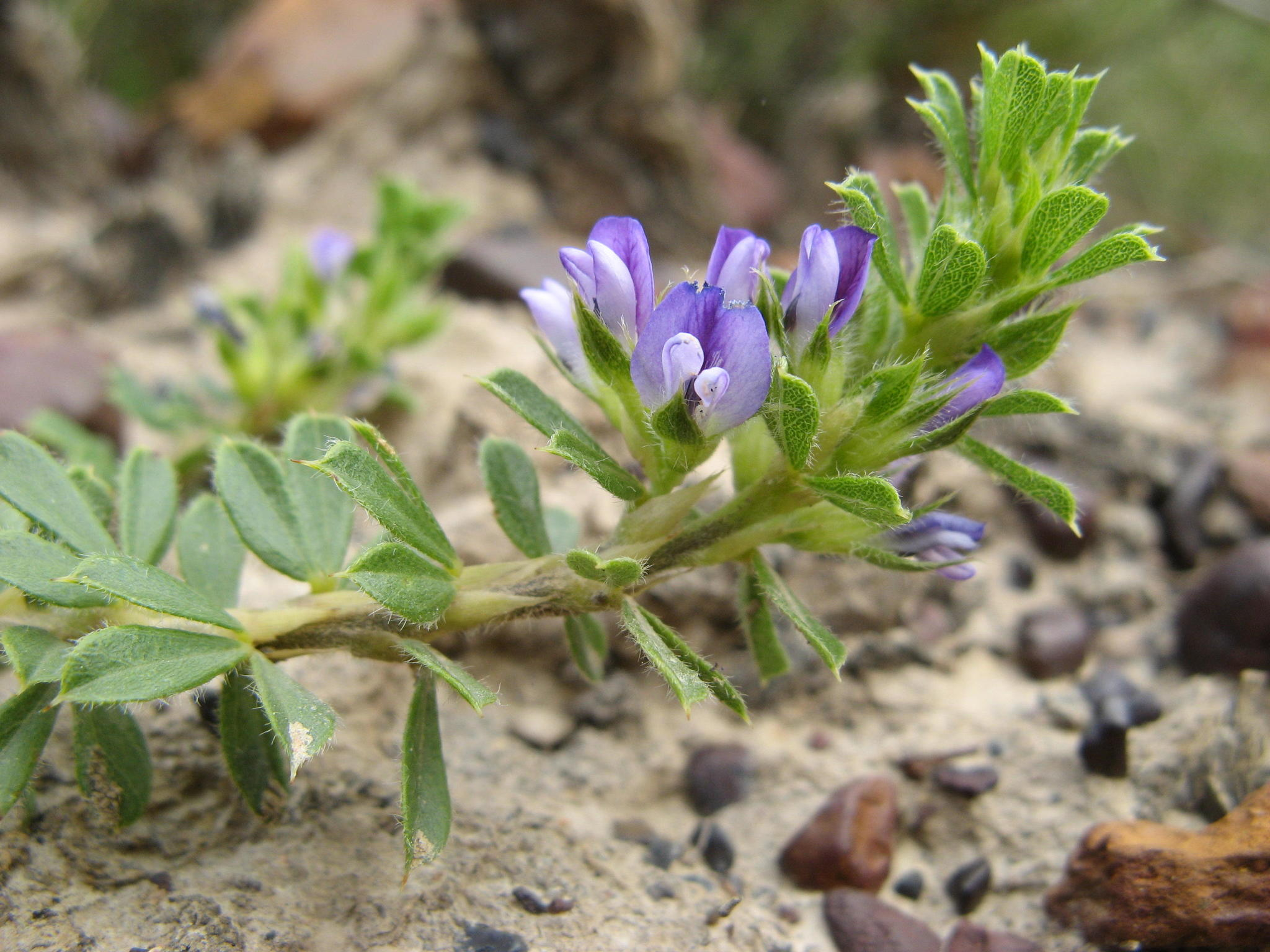
Indigenous vegetation near Fisherhaven

== History ==
During World War II, Royal Air Force (RAF) Squadron 262 established a diversion base at the lagoon and Consolidated PBY Catalina flying boats operated from here. The land on which Fisherhaven is situated was originally part of the Afdaksrivier farm which was first recorded in 1754. Before that the area of Middelvlei was first settled by the Khoisan people.
