= Bot River =

River in the Western Cape, South Africa

- Location within South Africa
- Etymology: Translated into Afrikaans (bot; a contraction of butter) from its Khoekhoe name Gouga, meaning 'rich in fat'.
- Native name: Botrivier (Afrikaans)

Location
- Country: South Africa
- Province: Western Cape

Physical characteristics
- Source: _
- Mouth: Indian Ocean
  - location: Western Cape, South Africa
  - coordinates: 34°22′5″S 19°5′55″E
  - elevation: 0 m (0 ft)

Basin features
- Protection status

Ramsar Wetland
- Official name: Bot - Kleinmond Estuarine System
- Designated: 31 January 2017
- Reference no.: 2291

Bot River (Afrikaans: Botrivier) is a river in the Western Cape province of South Africa. The Bot River mouth, located at Fisherhaven and Kleinmond, is a Ramsar site. Its tributaries include the Swart River. The river falls within the Drainage system G.

== Etymology ==
The Afrikaans name bot is a contraction of botter. This comes from the Khoekhoe making and bartering butter with traders in the Cape.

== See also ==
- List of rivers of South Africa
- List of dams in South Africa
- List of drainage basins of South Africa
- Water Management Areas
