= Kogelberg =

Mountain range in South Africa

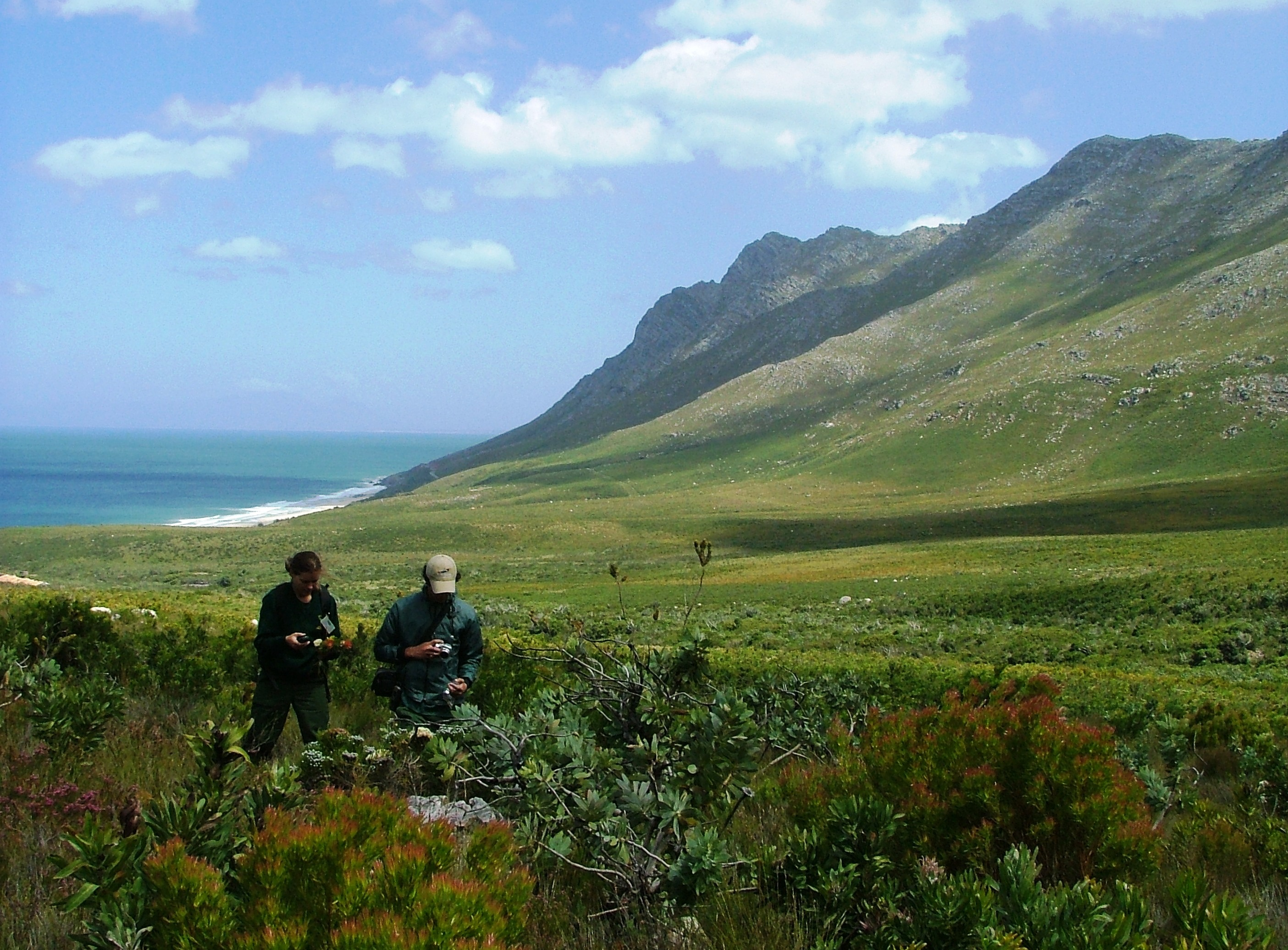
- Indigenous Fynbos in the Kogelberg Nature Reserve

Highest point
- Peak: Koeëlberg
- Elevation: 1,289 m (4,229 ft)
- Coordinates: 34°15′S 18°55′E

Geography
- Location within South Africa
- Country: South Africa

Geology
- Rock type: Table Mountain Sandstone

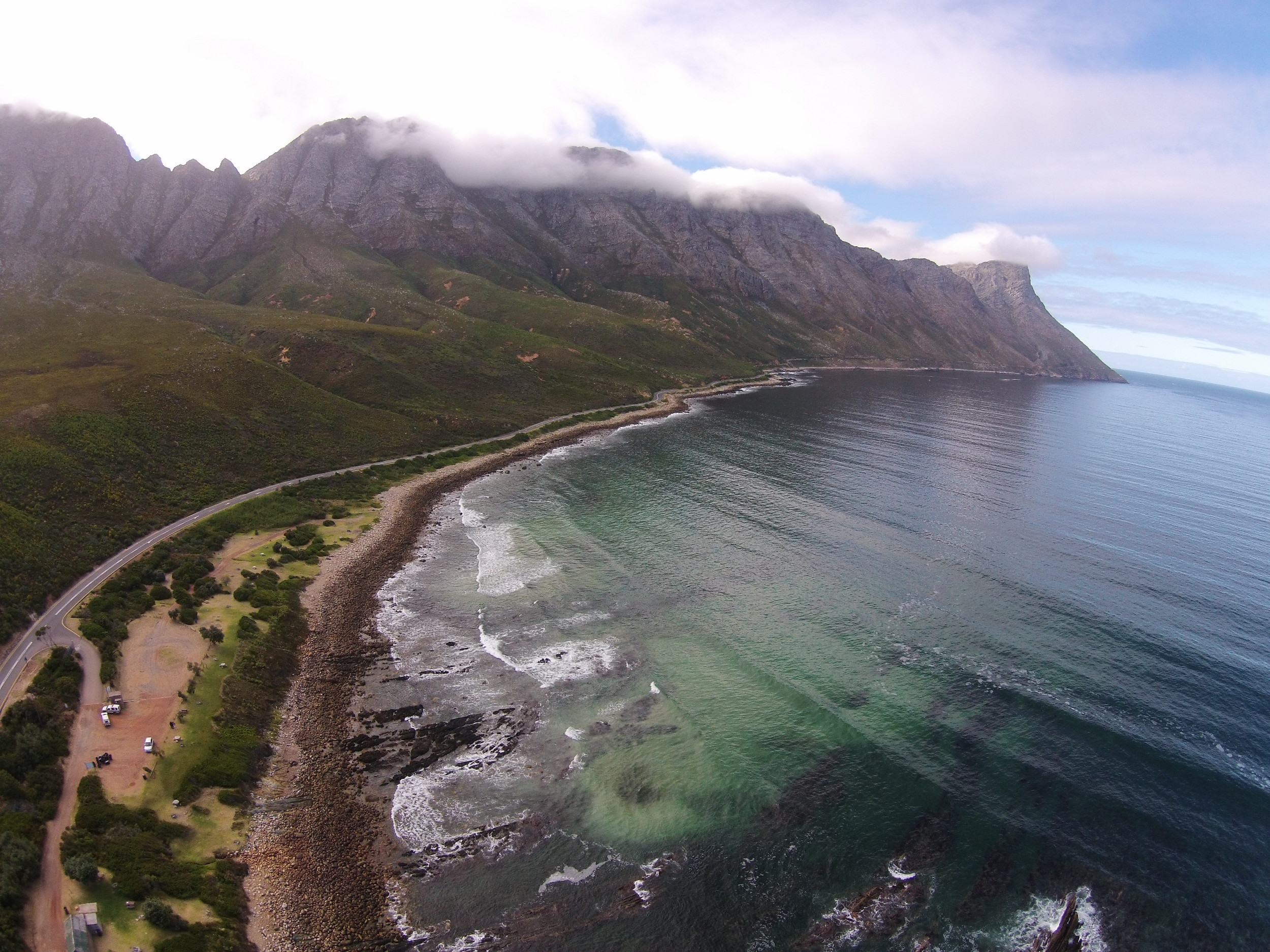
An aerial photograph of the Koegel Bay coastline and the R44 that runs along it.

The Kogelberg is a mountain range along the False Bay coast in the Western Cape of South Africa. Part of the Cape Fold Belt, it extends from south of the Elgin valley to Kleinmond.

The Kogelberg area has the steepest and highest drop directly into the ocean of any southern African coastal stretch.

== Ecology ==
The mountains are made predominantly of Table Mountain Sandstone and form some very rugged terrain, which is extremely rich in fynbos, the native Cape flora. The Elgin Valley's surrounding mountain ranges are considered the hub of the Cape floral kingdom. They contain more plant species than anywhere else in the floral region, and a large section of the mountain range is now protected in the massive Kogelberg Nature Reserve. The unique local vegetation type is classified as Kogelberg Sandstone Fynbos.

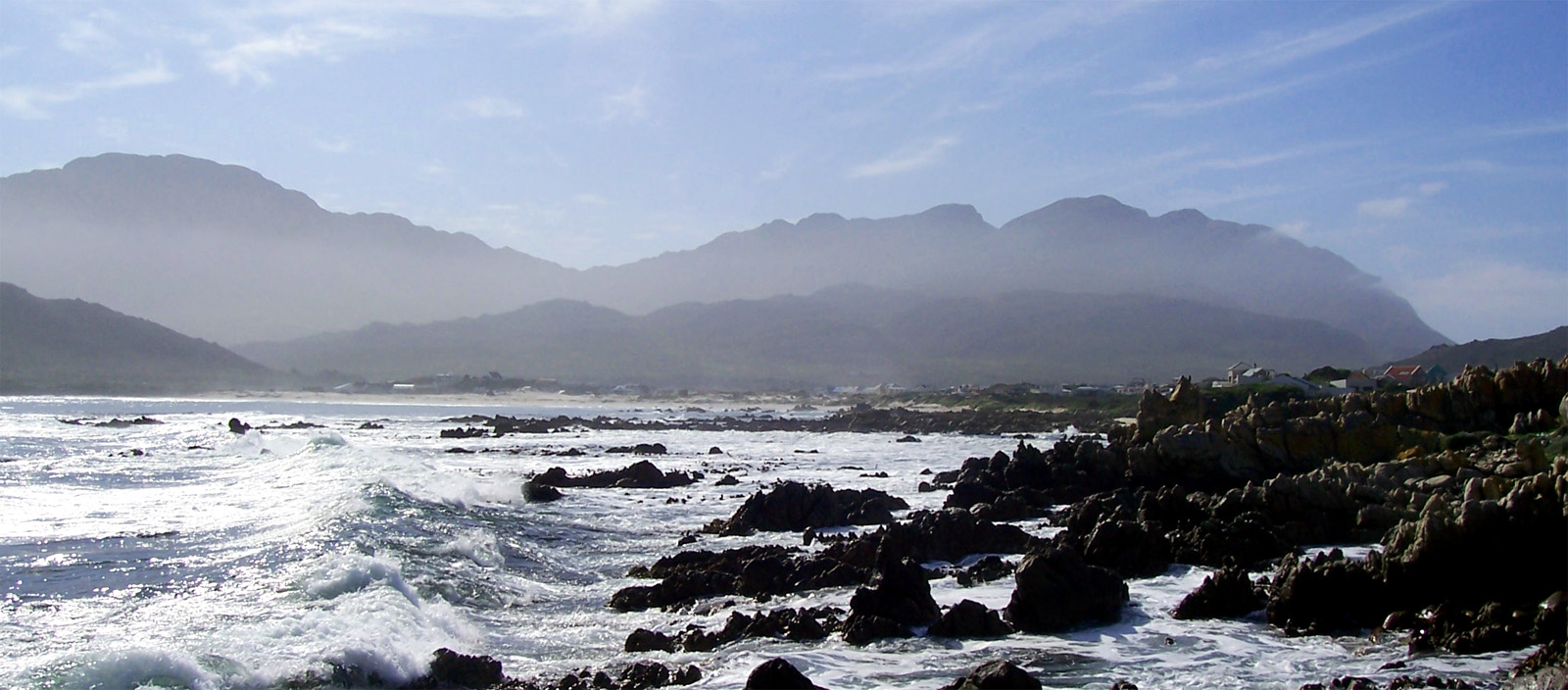
Pringle Bay near Cape Hangklip on the Kogelberg coast

The climate is Mediterranean, although milder than typical due to maritime winds blowing off the South Atlantic Ocean. Winters are wet to very wet and cool, with summers being dry, warm and windy. Snow occasionally occurs on the highest peaks. The area is protected within the Kogelberg Biosphere Reserve and comprises a core area of 103 629ha of protected land. The highest mountain is Koeëlberg (Afrikaans: Bullet Mountain) rising to 1289m above Koeël Bay.

== Infrastructure ==
The R44 route is a scenic ocean drive that follows this section of coastline.

Towns and villages in this region include:

- Rooiels
- Pringle Bay
- Betty's Bay
- Kleinmond
- Grabouw

== See also ==
- Kogelberg Nature Reserve
- Kogelberg Sandstone Fynbos
- R44 (Western Cape)
