= Kogelberg Nature Reserve =

Protected area in the Western Cape province of South Africa

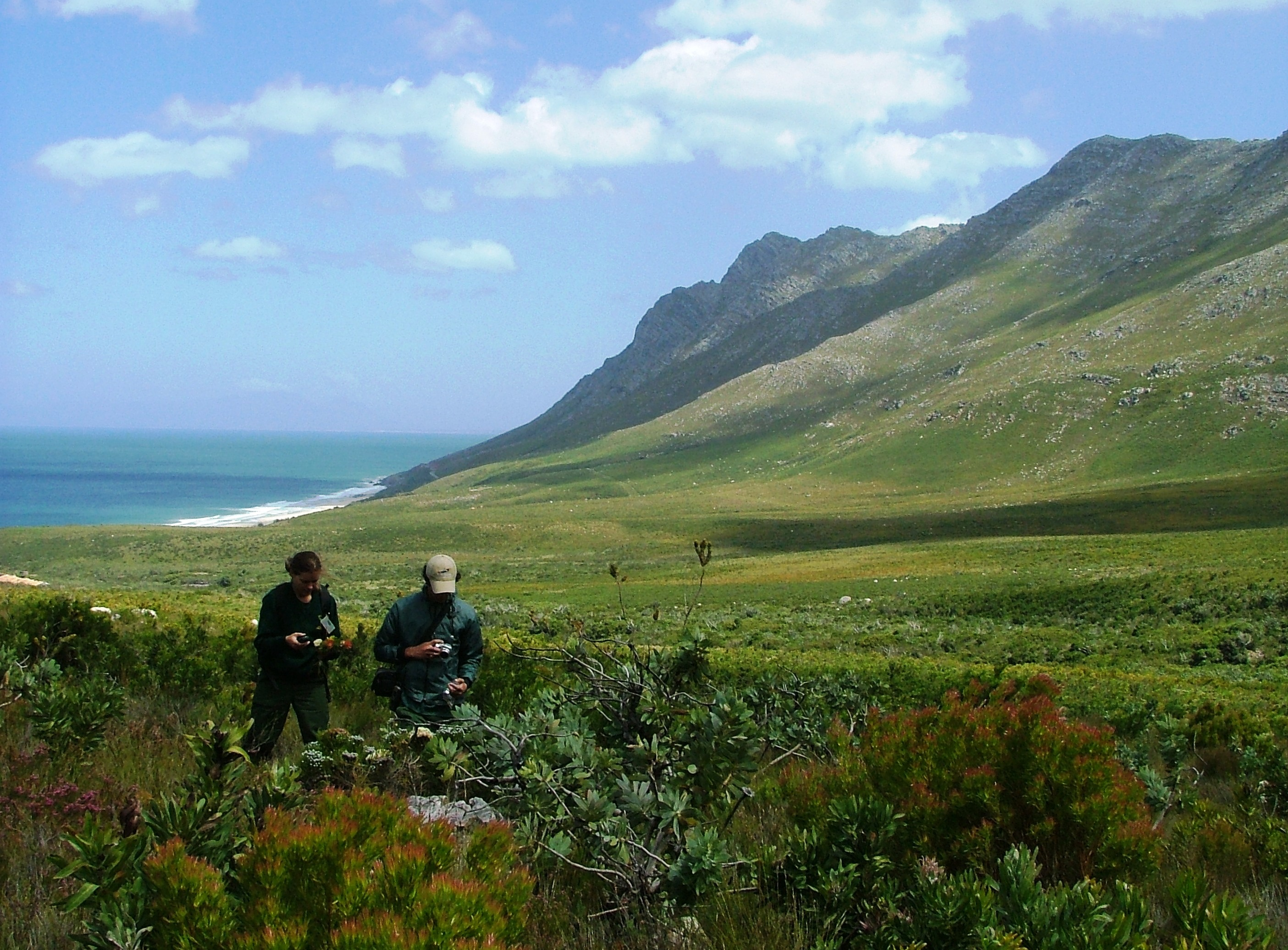
- Kogelberg Nature Reserve Kogelberg Biosphere Reserve
- Location: Near Gordon's Bay and Kleinmond, South Africa
- Coordinates: 34°18′S 18°54′E
- Area: 3,000 ha (7,400 acres; 30 km^{2}; 12 sq mi)
- Kogelberg Nature Reserve (South Africa) Kogelberg Nature Reserve (Western Cape)

Kogelberg Nature Reserve is a nature reserve of 3,000 ha (7,400 acres) comprising the Kogelberg Mountain Range, to the east of Cape Town, South Africa.

With about 1600 plant species, it contains a floral diversity per unit area that is greater than anywhere else in the world.

== Ecology ==
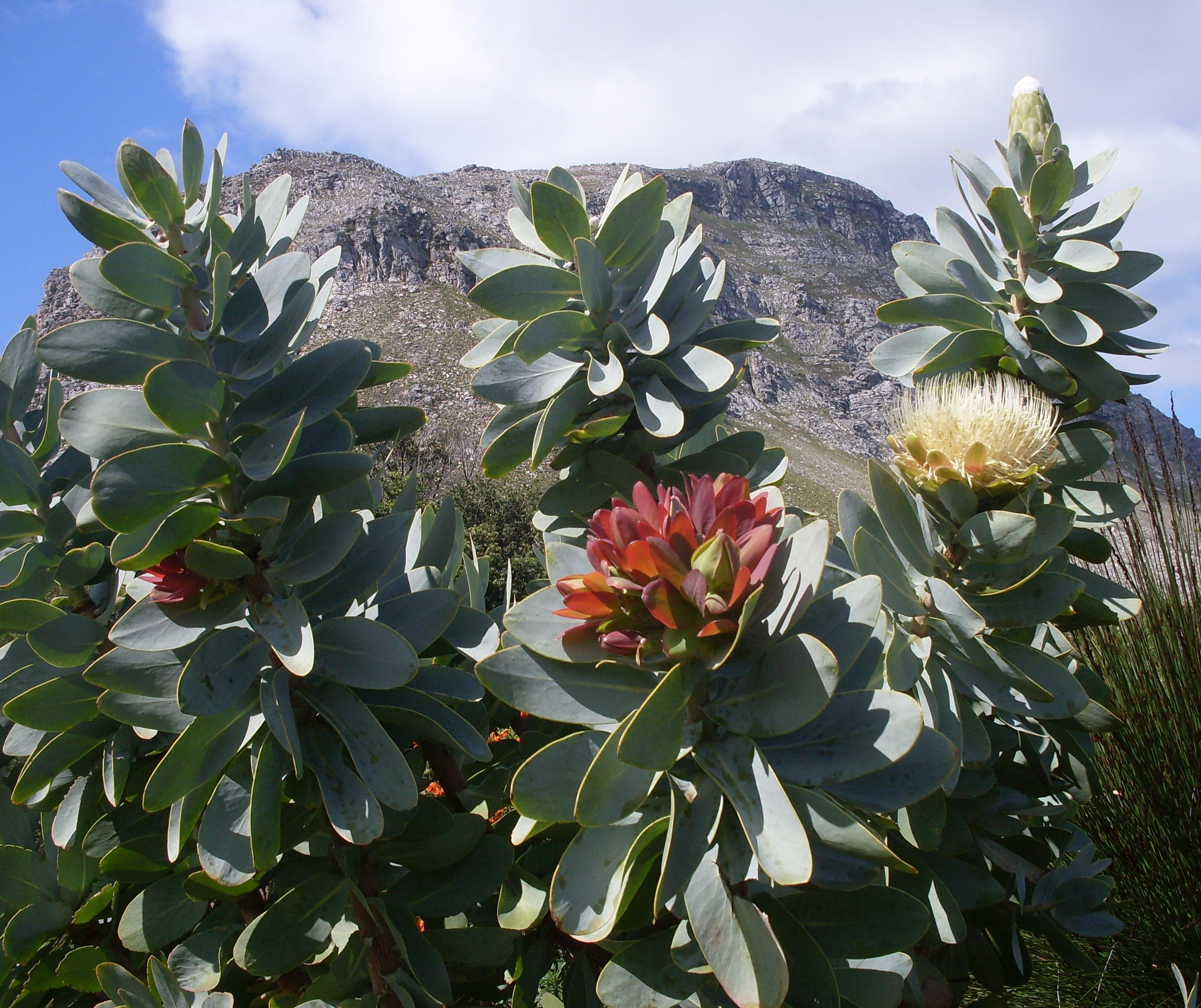
"Waboom protea" (Protea nitida) in the Kogelberg mountains

Located in the Kogelberg Mountains, along the mountainous coast on the eastern edge of Cape Town, this 3,000-hectare (7,400-acre; 30 km^{2}; 12 sq mi) nature reserve protects a significant portion of Kogelberg Sandstone Fynbos. Among the enormous range of plants in this local vegetation type are hundreds of species of Erica, a wide range of Protea species and a great many plant families which are endemic. The Kogelberg mountains are known as the heart of the Fynbos, and have a floral diversity per unit area that is greater than anywhere else in the world.

In addition to its unique mountain fynbos, other ecosystems include wetlands, as well as the riparian vegetation of the Palmiet River, which is the most untouched in the south western Cape and are home to forests of indigenous trees such as Wild almond, Butter-spoon, Rapanea and Yellowwoods. Shady montane forests exist in several spots - like Louwsbos, Platbos and Oudebos - where relic Southern Afrotemperate Forests grow in the ravines and river valleys.

== History ==
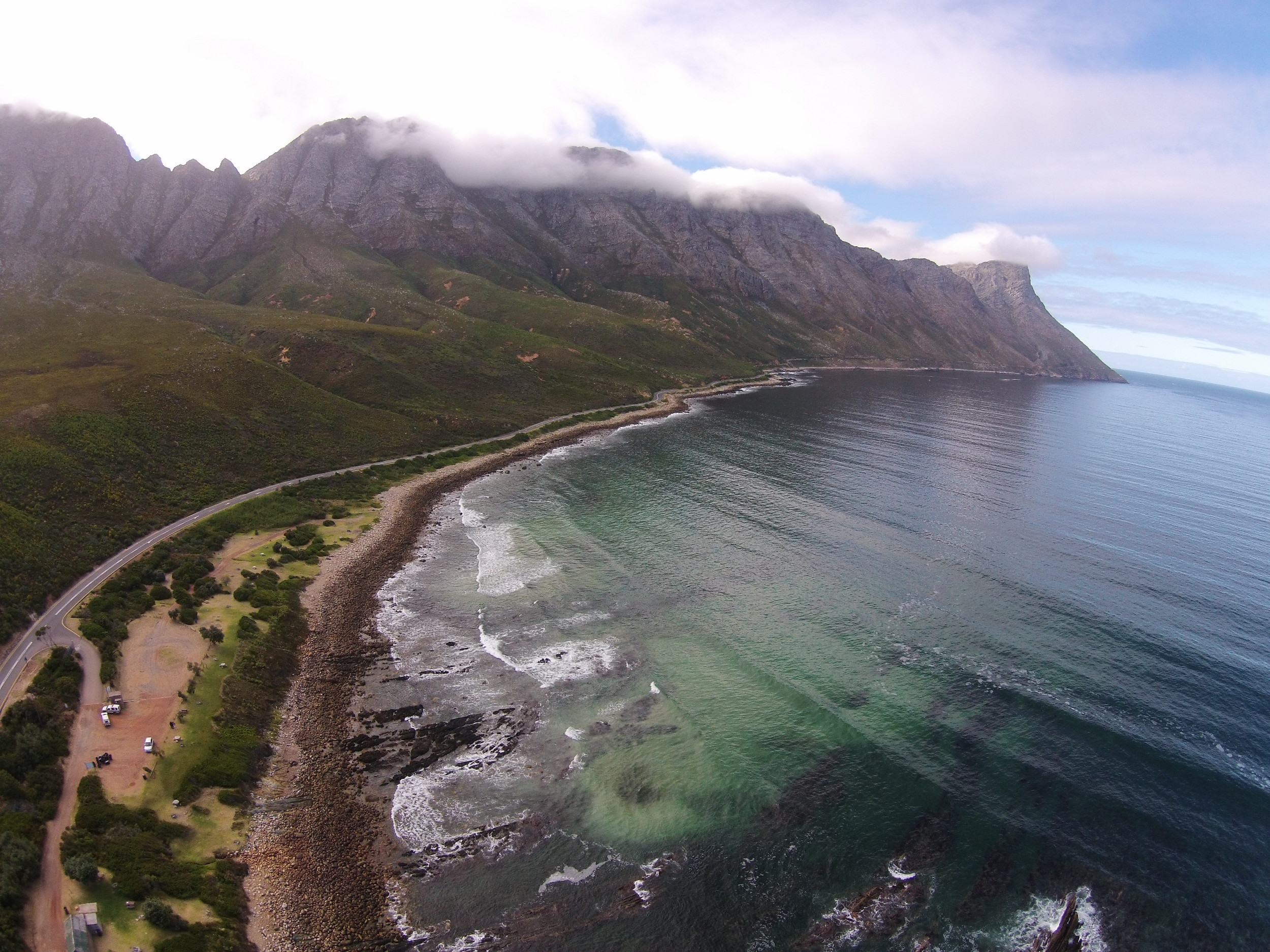
An aerial photograph of the Koegel Bay coastline and the R44 that runs along it.

The aboriginal inhabitants of the Kogelberg mountains were the San hunter-gatherers and the Khoi herders, whose shell-middens and burial areas can still be found. During the early colonial era, explorers occasionally penetrated the mountains and reported on the area's unusual beauty and teeming wildlife, however no permanent settlements were made, as the landscape was considered far too extreme and inaccessible for farming. The Kogelberg region therefore remained almost pristine. In the early 19th century the whole area was designated "Crown Land" by the government of the Cape Colony, and over a hundred years later, in 1935, the rugged area finally became accessible, when a road was built. This brought about rapid change, as the Department of Forestry took over the region in 1937 and declared its intention of using the area for state timber plantations.

The idea of turning the region into a nature reserve was first brought up by local landowner Harry Molteno, who put the proposal to his Cape Tercentenary Foundation board on 18 April 1951. A passionate fynbos enthusiast, he advocated for this vast stretch of mountain range to be returned to its natural state, for which he secured the vital support of the Cape Western Conservancy and Professor Harold Compton of Kirstenbosch Botanical Gardens. Later in the decade, his dream was finally realised when his financial grant secured the establishment of the Kogelberg preserve, comprising the land lying south of the N2 and west of the Palmiet River - with necessary infrastructure, fencing and biological surveys.

In 1987, this conservation area was transferred to Cape Nature Conservation, and formally became a nature reserve by the more specific standards of that body. Later developments include the construction of new visitors facilities in 2012, as well as the steady expansion of the surrounding "biosphere reserve".

== Greater Biosphere Reserve ==
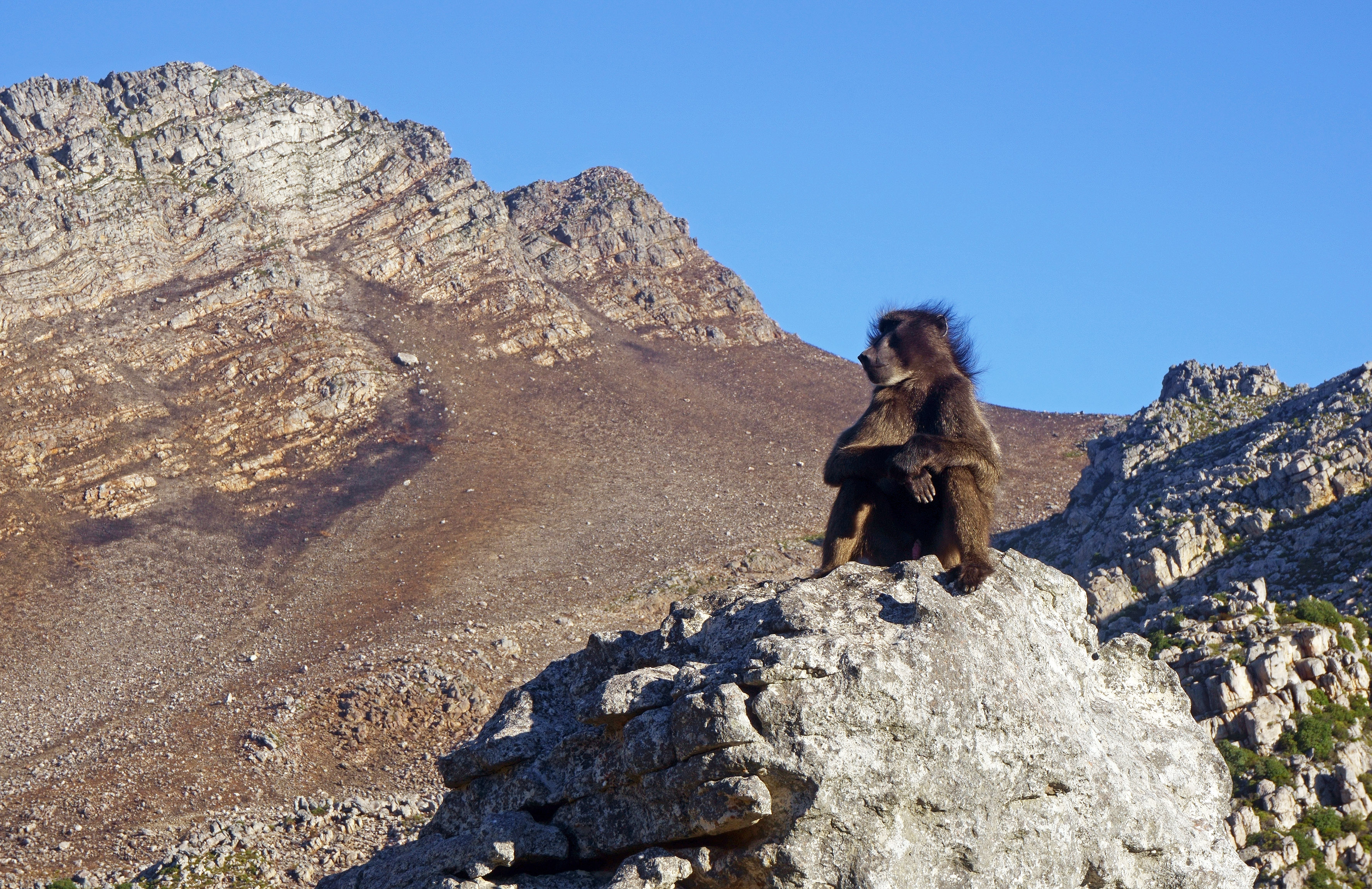
A male chacma baboon (Papio ursinus) in the Steenbras Nature Reserve

The 1,000-square-kilometre (390 sq mi) Kogelberg Biosphere Reserve includes the nature reserve as part of its "core conservation area". As such, the nature reserve is surrounded by buffer zones of natural vegetation and environmentally friendly recreational areas, as well as transitional zones of environmentally aware farms and towns.

The Kogelberg Nature Reserve itself, as the core conservation area, is exceptionally untouched. The mountain slopes are closed to the public and strictly protected. However, there is a portion that is open for hiking, along the valleys and waterfalls of the Steenbras River Gorge.

The R44 road is a scenic road that skirts the mountainous coast of the Kogelberg reserve. Whales and dolphins can also frequently be seen from this road.

== Gallery ==
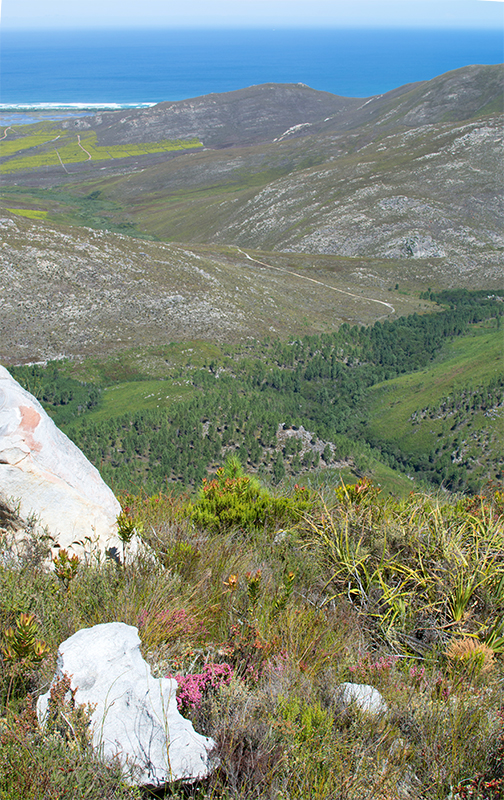
Kogelberg Nature Reserve ocean view.

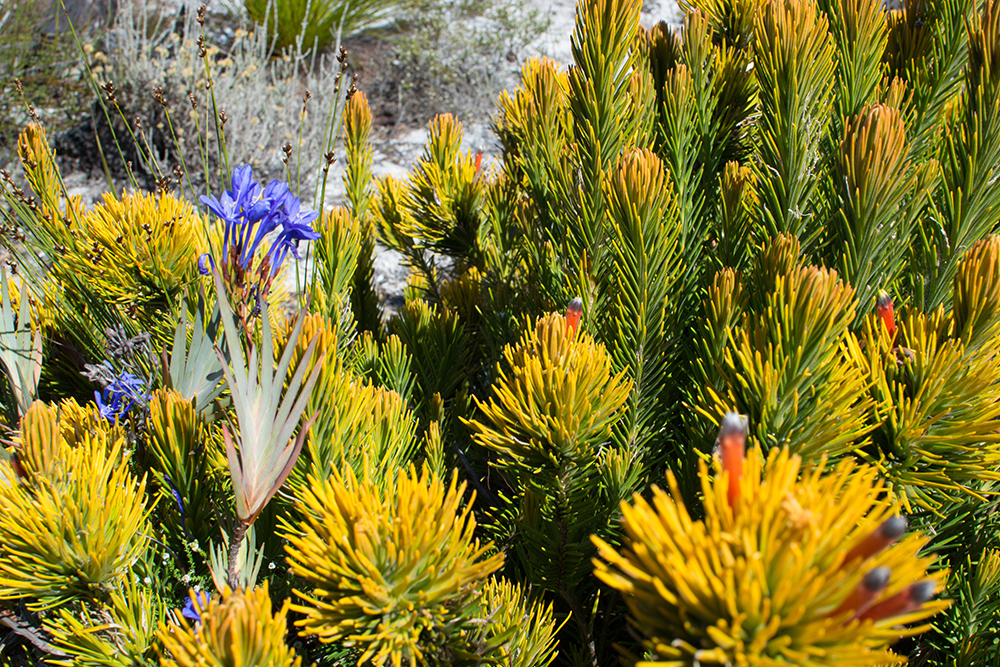
Kogelberg Nature Reserve plant life.

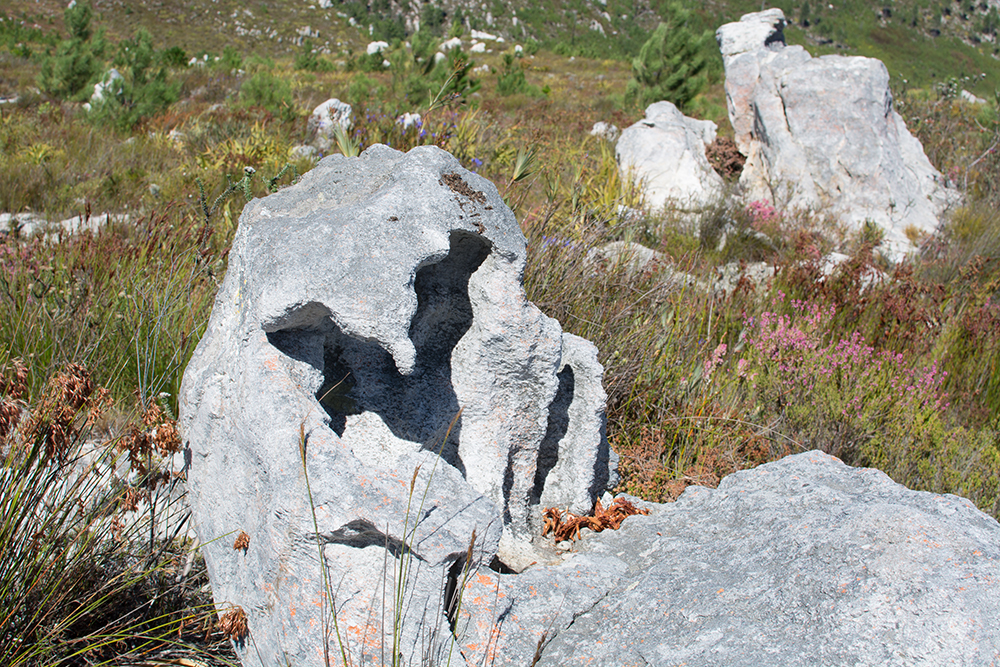
Kogelberg Nature Reserve rock formations.

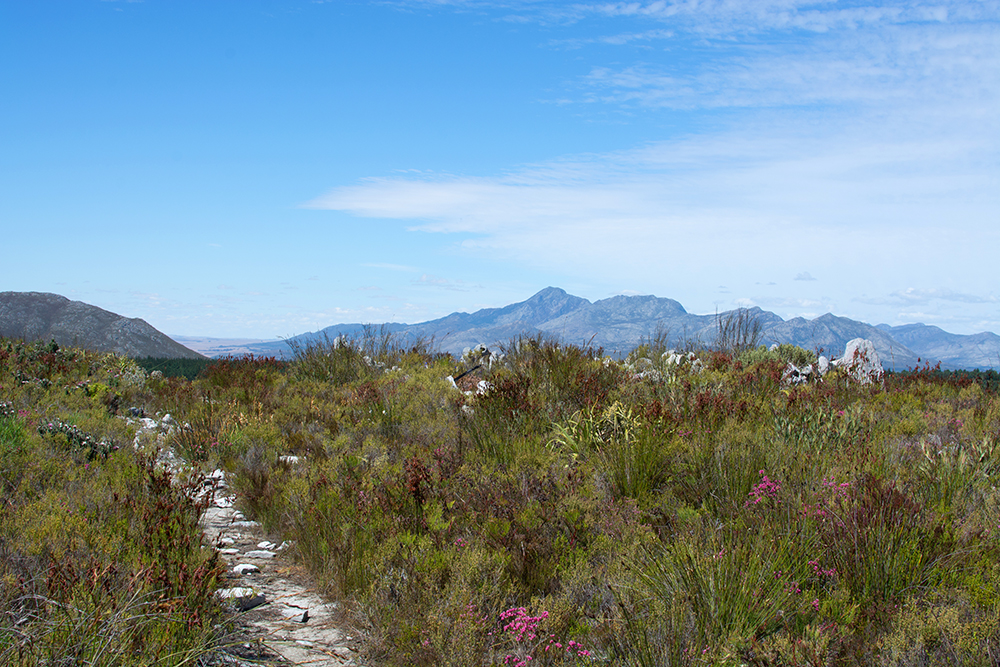
Kogelberg Nature Reserve path.

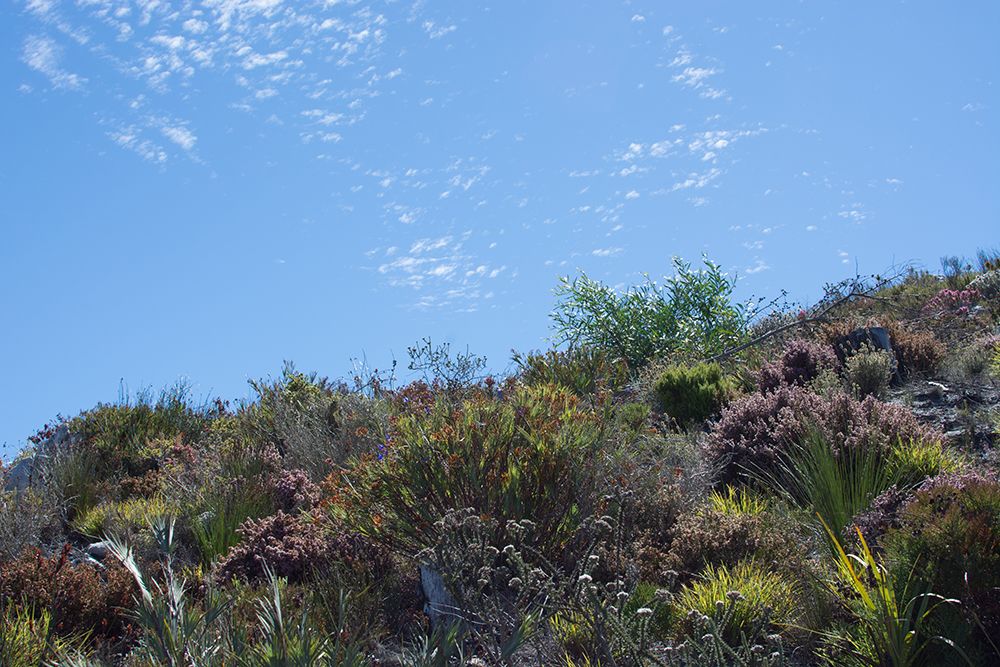
Kogelberg Nature Reserve.

== See also ==
- Biodiversity of Cape Town – Diversity of the natural environment of Cape Town
- List of nature reserves in Cape Town
- Southern Afrotemperate Forest – Main indigenous forest-type in the south-western part of South Africa
- Elgin, South Africa – Region in the Western Cape, South Africa
