= Kleinmond =

- Town
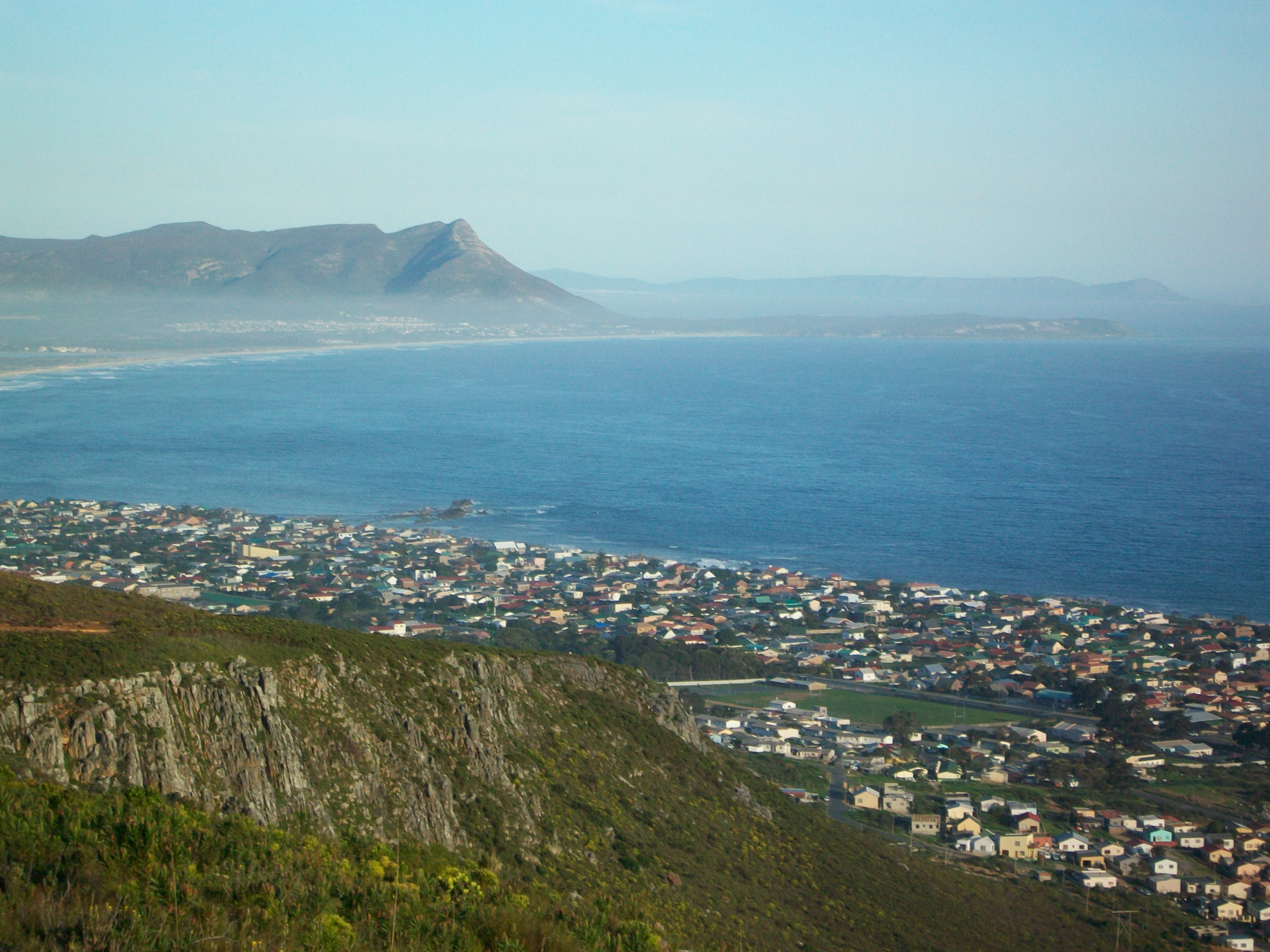
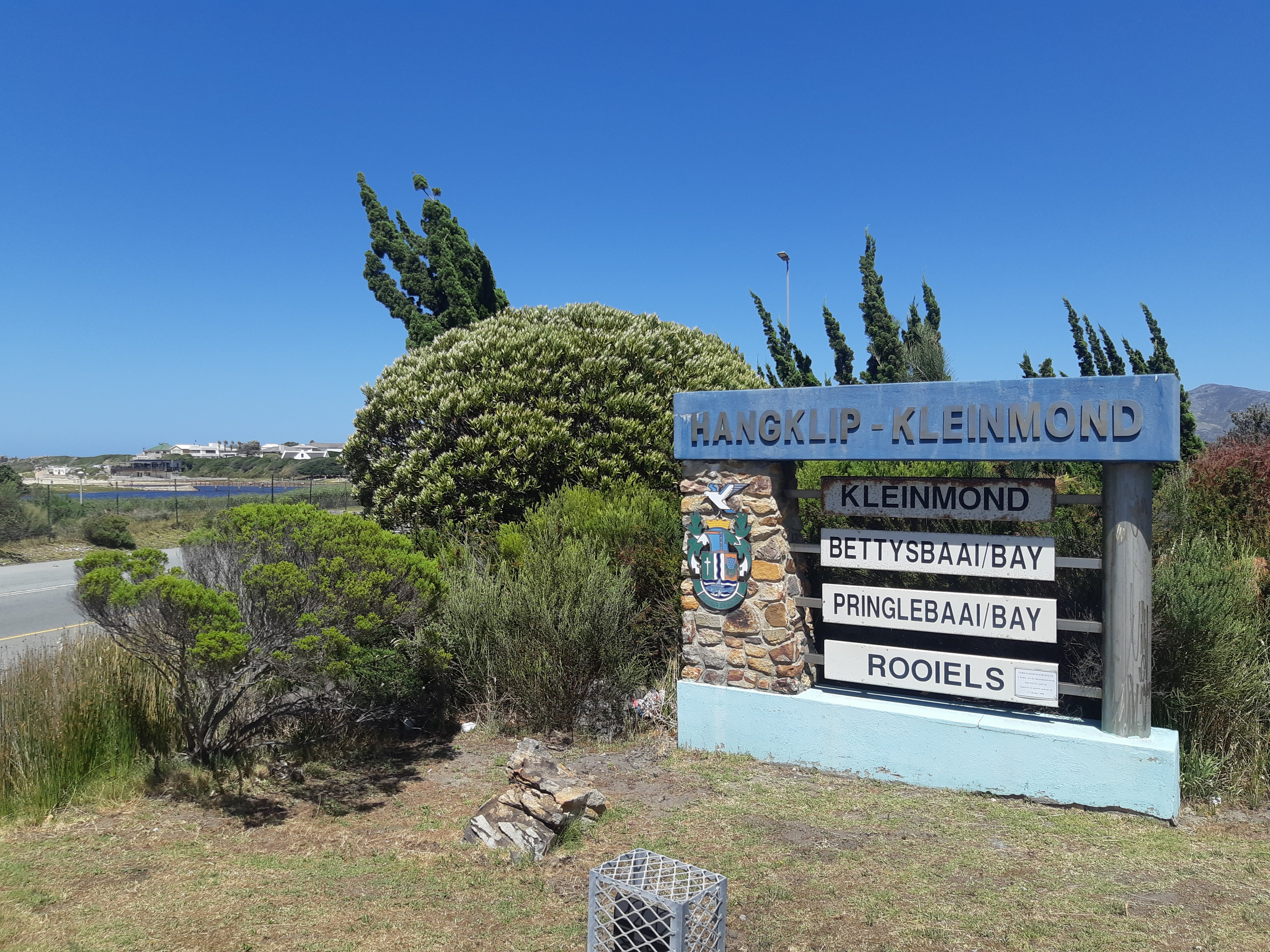
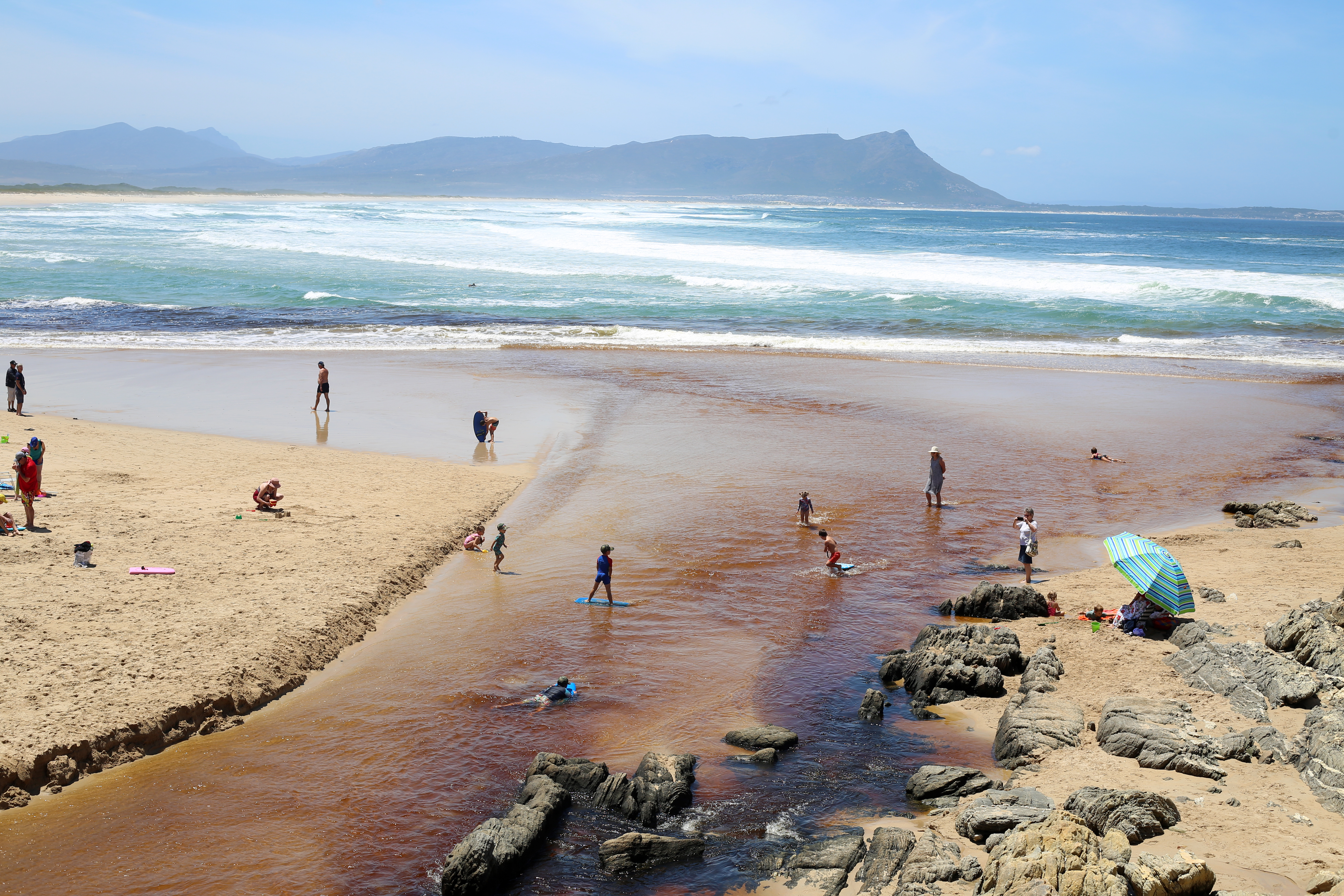
- Top: Kleinmond as seen from the surrounding mountains. Left: welcome sign to Kleinmond. Right: Kleimond Beach at the mouth of the Bot River lagoon.

- Location within Western Cape Location within South Africa Location within Africa
- Coordinates: 34.34°S 19.02°E
- Country: South Africa
- Province: Western Cape
- District: Overberg
- Municipality: Overstrand

Government
  - Councillor: Grant Cohen (DA)

Area
  - Total: 7.13 km^{2} (2.75 sq mi)

Population (2011)
  - Total: 6,634
  - Density: 930/km^{2} (2,410/sq mi)

Racial makeup (2011)
  - Black African: 34.8%
  - Coloured: 27.6%
  - Indian/Asian: 0.3%
  - White: 36.3%
  - Other: 0.9%

First languages (2011)
  - Afrikaans: 60.1%
  - Xhosa: 25.5%
  - English: 7.6%
  - Sotho: 3.2%
  - Other: 3.5%
- Time zone: UTC+2 (SAST)
- Postal code (street): 7195
- PO box: 7195
- Area code: 028
- Website: www.kleinmondtourism.co.za

Kleinmond is a small coastal town in the Overberg region of the Western Cape province, South Africa. It is situated inside a UNESCO-declared biosphere about 90 km east of Cape Town between Betty's Bay and Hermanus. The town's name, meaning "small mouth" in Afrikaans, refers to its location at the mouth of the Bot River lagoon. Stone axe heads found in the area indicate that people already lived in the vicinity of nearby Hangklip 20,000 years ago. Information about the area has existed in writing since the seventeenth century.

== Tourism ==
Tourism plays a large role in the town's economy due to its popularity with holiday makers from across the Western Cape and Cape Town in particular.

== Environment ==
From June to November, southern right whales can be seen from the coastline, where they come to mate and calf.

A herd of wild horses is known to roam free in the marshlands at the Bot River lagoon area, next to Rooisands Nature Reserve. They are believed to be South Africa's only herd of wild horses in a wetland habitat. The Kogelberg Nature Reserve borders the town. Kleinmond's beach is a Blue Flag beach and is popular with South African holiday makers.

== Notable residents ==
- Pieter Kuyper Albertyn (1897 – 1973), rugby player.
- Barry Streek (1948-2006), journalist and anti-apartheid activist.
- Johannes Kerkorrel (1960 - 2002), singer-songwriter, journalist and playwright.
