= Dyer Island Nature Reserve Complex =

Protected islets off the coast of Gansbaai, South Africa

- Dias Island
- IUCN category Ia (strict nature reserve)
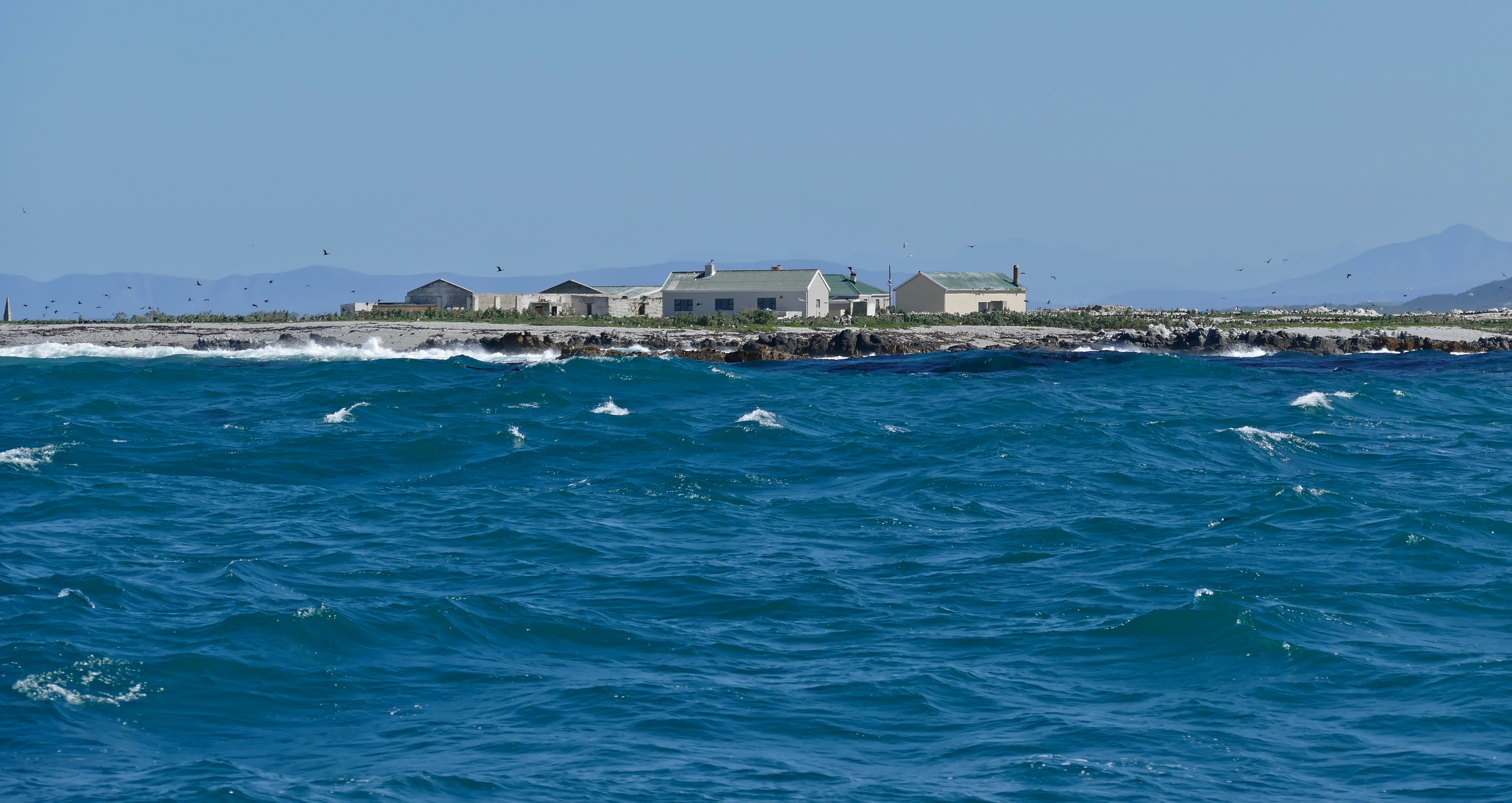
- Dyer Island and Geyser Island, off the coast of Gansbaai, and Quoin Rock, off Quoin Point Nature Reserve.
- Location: Western Cape, South Africa
- Nearest city: Gansbaai
- Coordinates: 34.6829°S 19.4203°E
- Established: March 9, 1988; 38 years ago
- Governing body: CapeNature

Ramsar Wetland
- Official name: Dyer Island Provincial Nature Reserve and Geyser Island Provincial Nature Reserve
- Designated: 29 March 2019
- Reference no.: 528

The Dyer Island Nature Reserve Complex is a protected area off the coast of Gansbaai in the Western Cape, South Africa. It consists of three islets, namely Dyer Island; Geyser Island; and Quoin Rock, that lie 25 km (16 mi) away from Dyer Island, off the coast of Quoin Point Nature Reserve and Agulhas National Park.

Combined, Dyer Island and Geyser Island are a designated Ramsar site.

Dyer Island is the largest in the group of islands, and lies about 8 kilometres (5.0 mi) offshore from Gansbaai and Danger Point Lighthouse. It is home to a declining colony of African penguins (≈ 5000 individuals in 2015). Geyser Island is a smaller island nearby and is home to around 60,000 brown fur seals.

The shallow channel between the two islands is popularly known as Shark Alley.

The reserve cannot be accessed by the general public.

== History ==
Portuguese seafarers in the 15th century named Dyer Island was Ilha da Fera ("Island of wild creatures").

It was named Dyer Island after Samson Dyer, an emigrant from the US to the Cape Colony in 1806, who lived on the island collecting guano, which he sold to mainlanders as fertiliser.

In 1988, the two islands were named individually as Provincial Nature Reserves. In 2019, the two islands were designated as a Ramsar site.

== Biodiversity ==
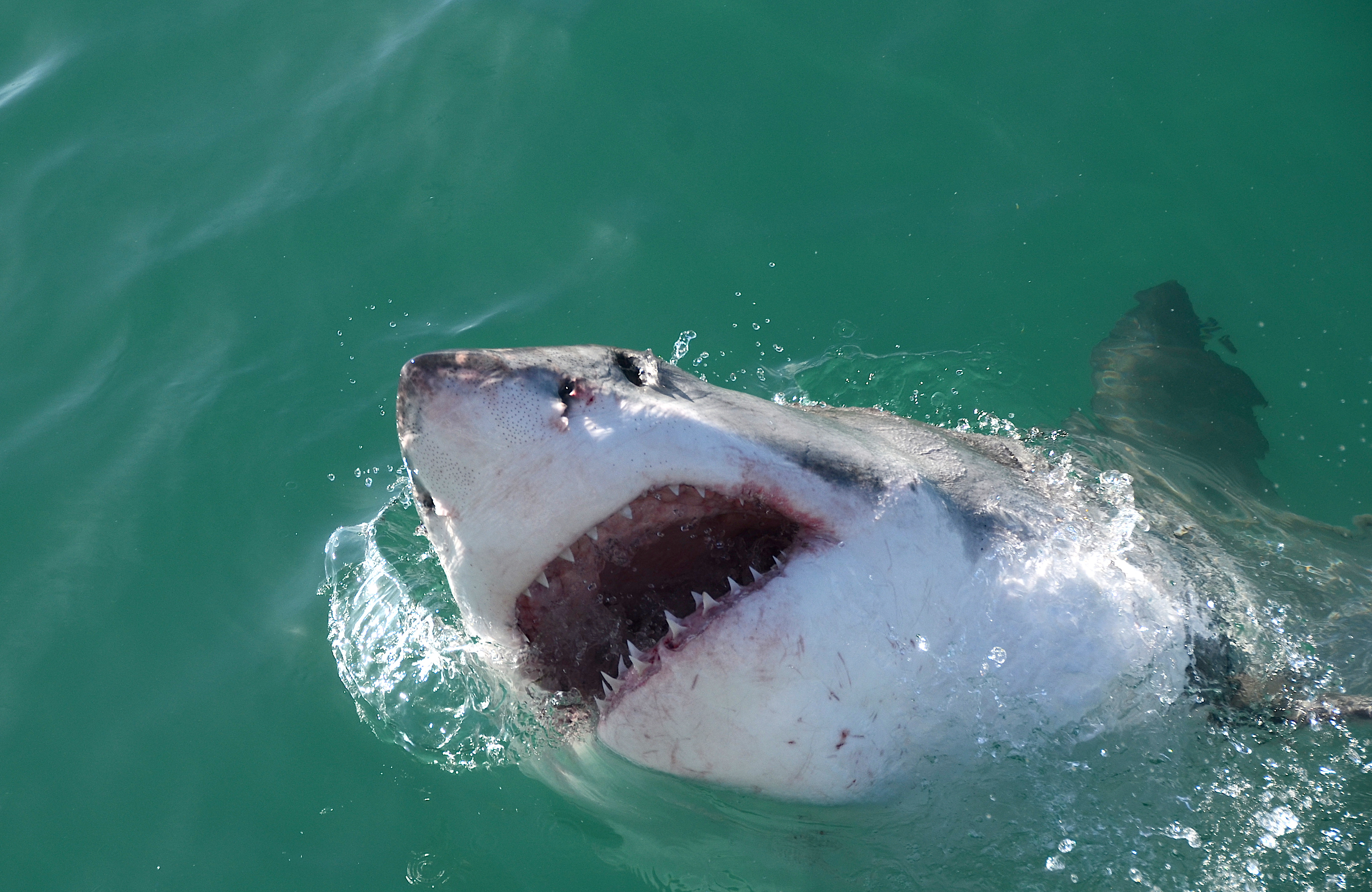
Great white shark near Dyer Island

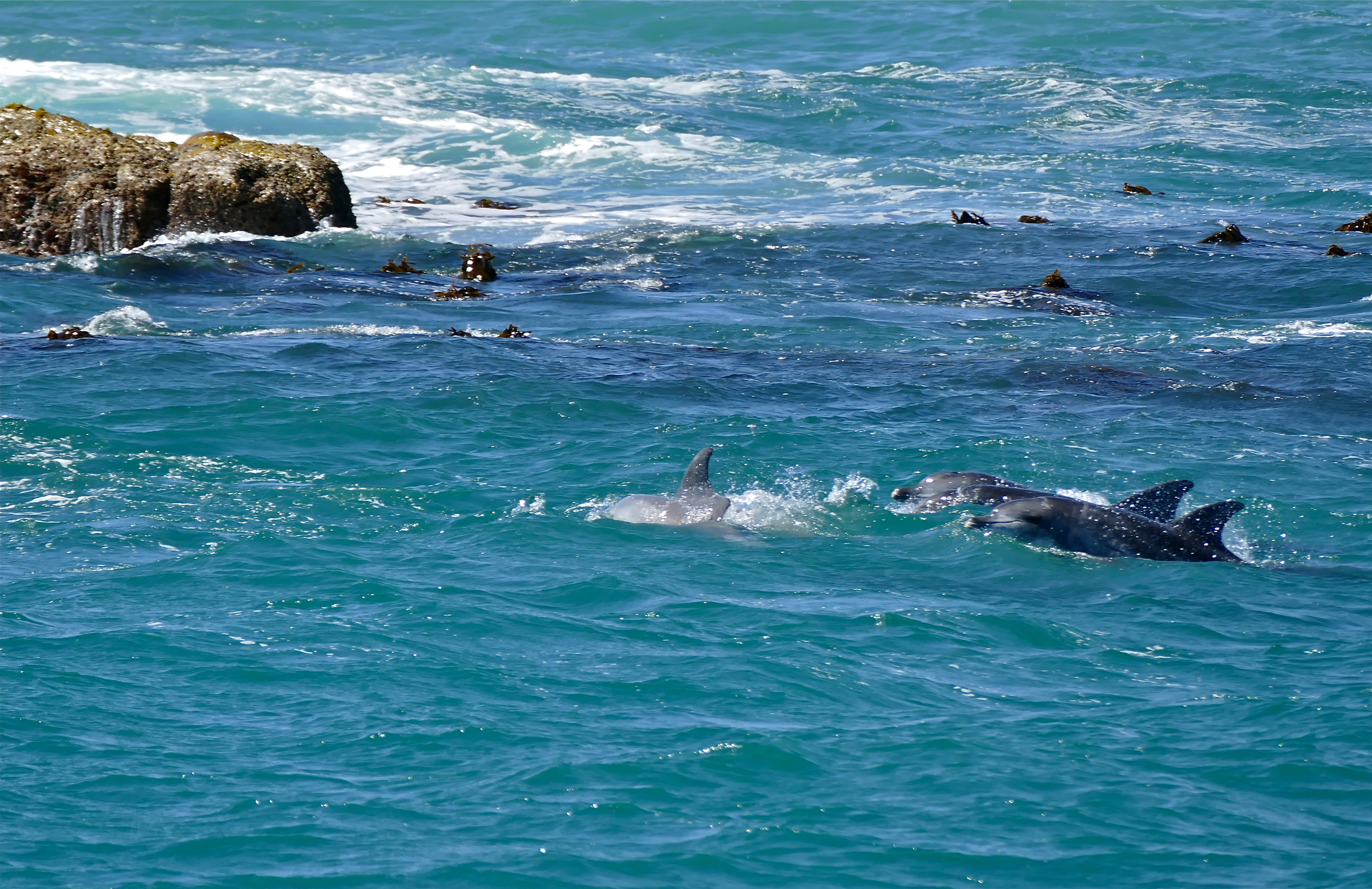
Indo-Pacific Bottlenose dolphins off Geyser Island.

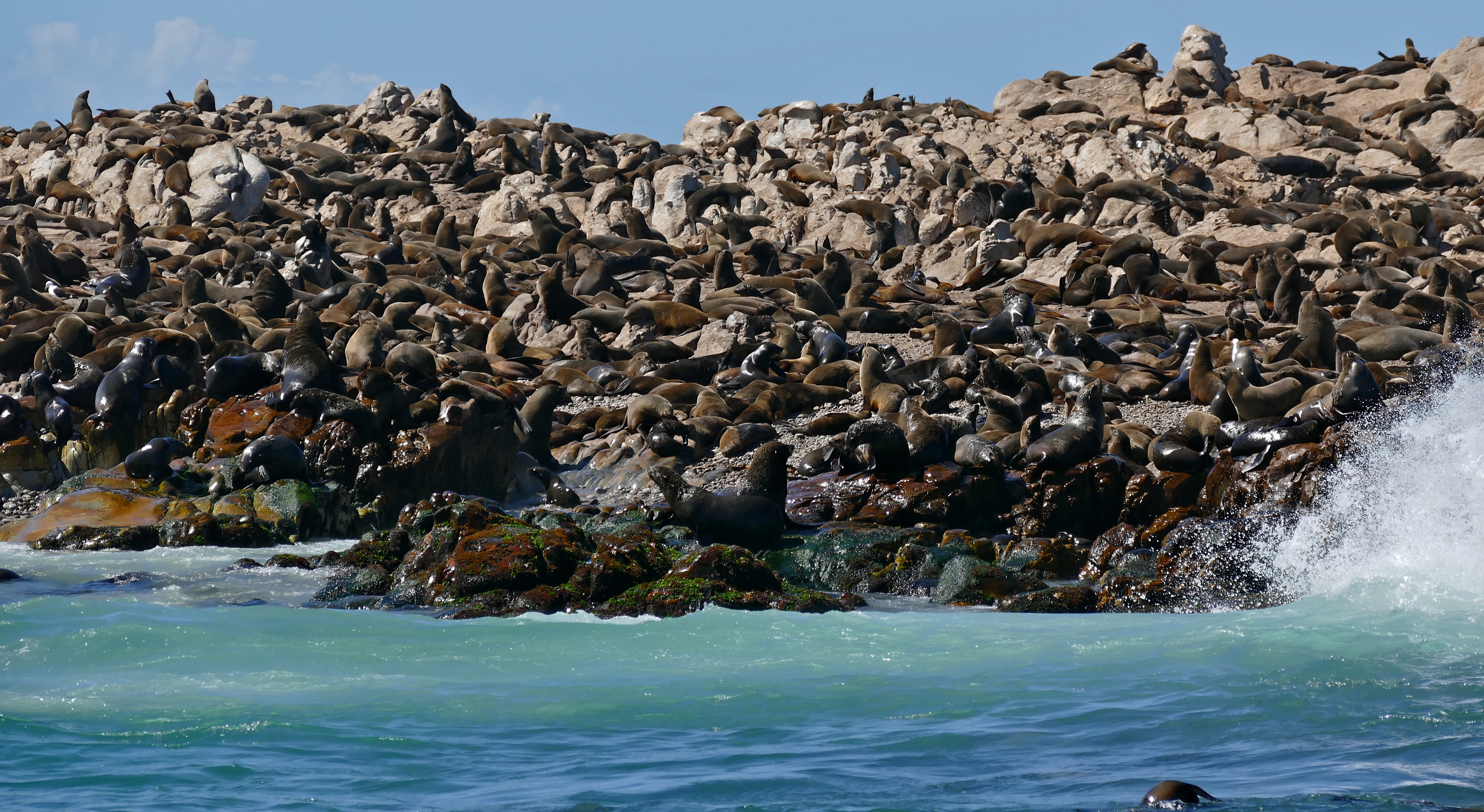
South African fur seals at Geyser Island

The reserve is home to a number of threatened species. It is home to 48 bird species, of which 21 species breed here.

=== Birds ===
- African penguin
- African oystercatcher
- Antarctic tern
- Arctic tern
- Bank cormorant
- Cape cormorant
- Caspian tern
- Common tern
- Crowned cormorant
- Greater crested tern
- Hartlaub’s gull
- Leach’s storm petrel
- Roseate tern
- Sandwich tern
- White-breasted cormorant

=== Fish ===
There are 26 species of fish found in the surrounding waters, including the endangered Galjoen. Great white sharks used to be plentiful, but they have all but deserted the area, thought to be caused by orcas hunting them.

=== Mammals ===
- Cape fur seal
