= Erica calcareophila =

Scientific classification
- Kingdom: Plantae
- Clade: Tracheophytes
- Clade: Angiosperms
- Clade: Eudicots
- Clade: Asterids
- Order: Ericales
- Family: Ericaceae
- Genus: Erica
- Species: E. calcareophila

Binomial name
- Erica calcareophila E.G.H.Oliv.

Species of flowering plant

Erica calcareophila, the limestone heath, is a plant belonging to the genus Erica and forming part of the fynbos. The species is endemic to the Western Cape and the only population is at Pearly Beach. The habitat is threatened by invasive plants and power line construction.
