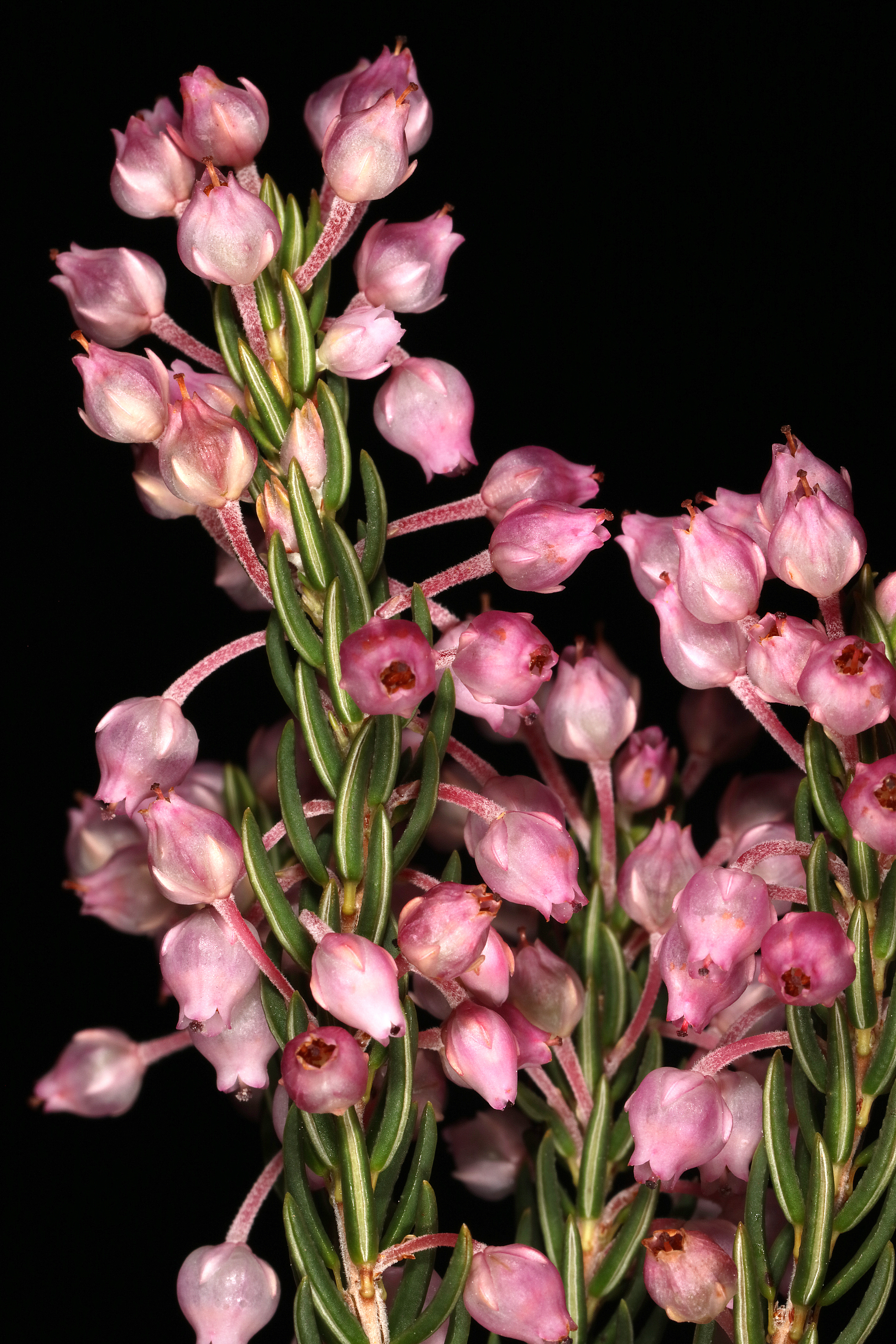

Scientific classification
- Kingdom: Plantae
- Clade: Tracheophytes
- Clade: Angiosperms
- Clade: Eudicots
- Clade: Asterids
- Order: Ericales
- Family: Ericaceae
- Genus: Erica
- Species: E. irregularis

Binomial name
- Erica irregularis Benth.

= Erica irregularis =

Species of plant

Erica irregularis, the Gansbaai heath, is a plant that belongs to the genus Erica and is part of the fynbos. This plant is native to the Western Cape and occurs from Stanford to Gansbaai. There are three known populations. The plant is extremely popular as cut flowers and this threatens its survival and there is no legislation to protect it. Also, the growth of the invasive plant, rooikrans, is a threat to the plant's habitat. Wildfires also pose a threat to the plant.
