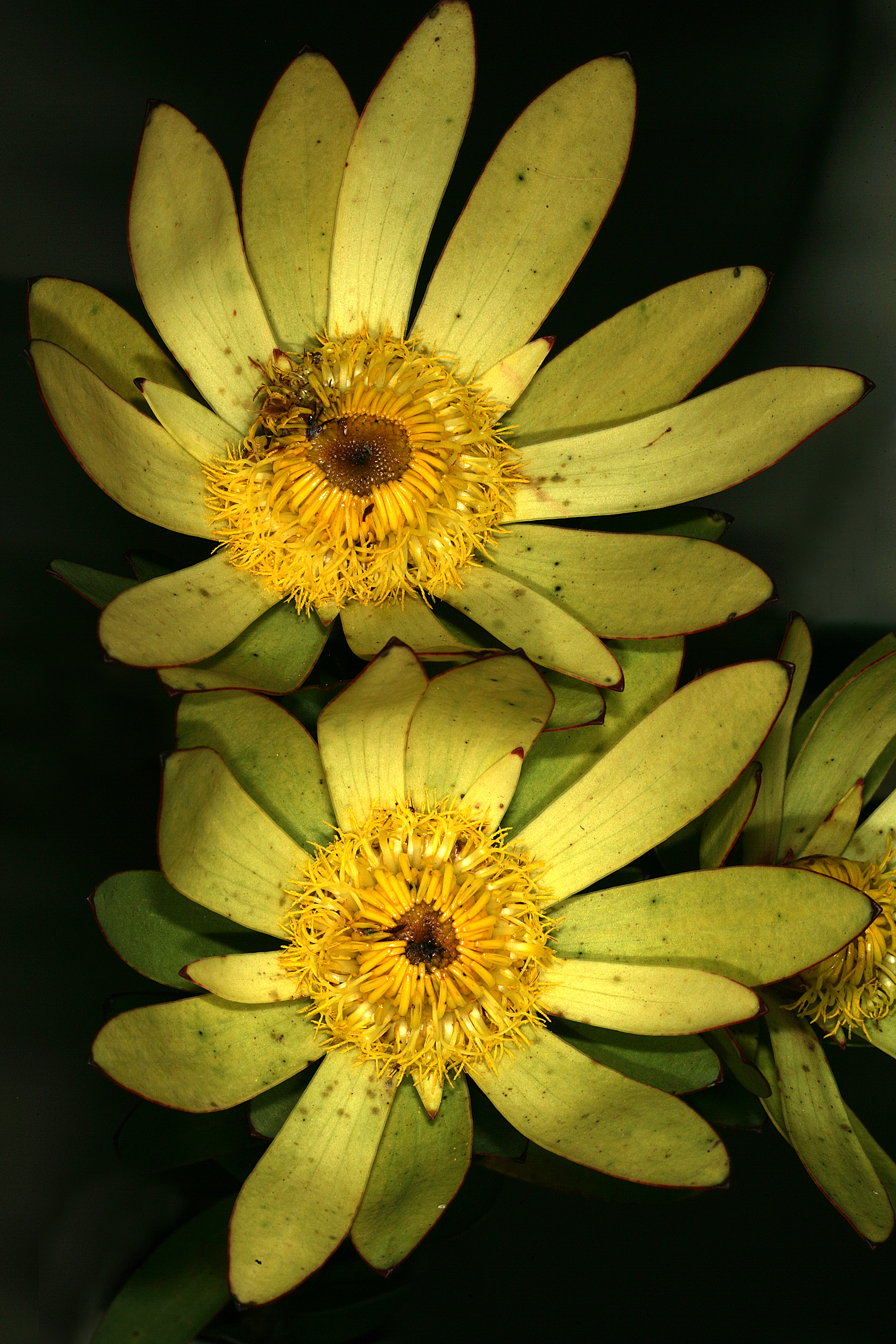

Conservation status
- Endangered (IUCN 3.1)

Scientific classification
- Kingdom: Plantae
- Clade: Tracheophytes
- Clade: Angiosperms
- Clade: Eudicots
- Order: Proteales
- Family: Proteaceae
- Genus: Leucadendron
- Species: L. elimense

Binomial name
- Leucadendron elimense E.Phillips

= Leucadendron elimense =

Species of flowering plant

Leucadendron elimense, the Elim conebush, is a flower-bearing shrub, which belongs to the genus Leucadendron and forms part of the fynbos. The plant is native to the Western Cape, South Africa.

== Description ==
The shrub grows to 1.5 m (4.9 ft) tall and dies after burning but the seeds survive. The shrub blooms from July to September. The seeds are stored in a toll on the female plant and only fall to the ground two months after the flower has ripened. The seeds could possibly be collected by rodents. The plant is unisexual and there are separate plants with male and female flowers, which are pollinated by small insects.

In Afrikaans, it is known as Elim-tolbos.

== Distribution and habitat ==
The plant occurs on the Elim Plain from Gansbaai to Bredasdorp. It grows mainly in shallow soil at heights of 10–170 m (33–558 ft).

== Subspecies ==
- Leucadendron elimense subsp. elimense
- Leucadendron elimense subsp. nova
- Leucadendron elimense subsp. salteri
- Leucadendron elimense subsp. vyeboomense
