= Bantamsklip, Western Cape =

Place in Western Cape, South Africa

Coordinates: 34°42′25″S 19°33′15″E

Bantamsklip in red with the other potential nuclear sites in blue

Bantamsklip is a rocky stretch of coast approximately 7 km SE of Pearly Beach in the Overberg district of the Western Cape province of South Africa. The site is 23 km south east of the town of Gansbaai.

- 1:50 000 map series reference 3419DA

Bantamsklip is situated on the Groot Hagelkraal farm. The farm is a registered private nature reserve and a South African Nature Foundation Natural Heritage Site, its immediate neighbours are the SANParks (South African National Parks) at Waterford, Pearly Beach Nature Reserve and the Soetfontein Nature Reserve. Red Data listings show 75% of threatened plant species in South Africa occur only in the Southwestern Cape. There are 1600 listed Red Data species within 100 kilometers of Bantamsklip. There are 22 Red Data listed species on the Bantamsklip property itself, of which six are entirely restricted to the farm. The property represents the foremost conservation priority in the Cape Floristic Region and is regarded as the world's "hottest" of biological diversity hot spots. In addition to this the Bantamsklip coastline has the highest level of marine endemism found in southern African coastal waters, due to the cool Benguela upwelling causing very high levels of primary nutrient productivity, enhanced by the seasonal south easterly and south westerly prevailing winds and the topography of the Agulhas coast lying adjacent to these climatic and oceanic systems. For these reasons there is significant controversy over plans by Eskom to construct a Nuclear Power Station on the site.

The environmental impact assessments of 2009 have been revised and updated and public participation meetings held in Gansbaai Tourism Bureau, Gansbaai, 15 October 2015.
