= Fishery cooperative =

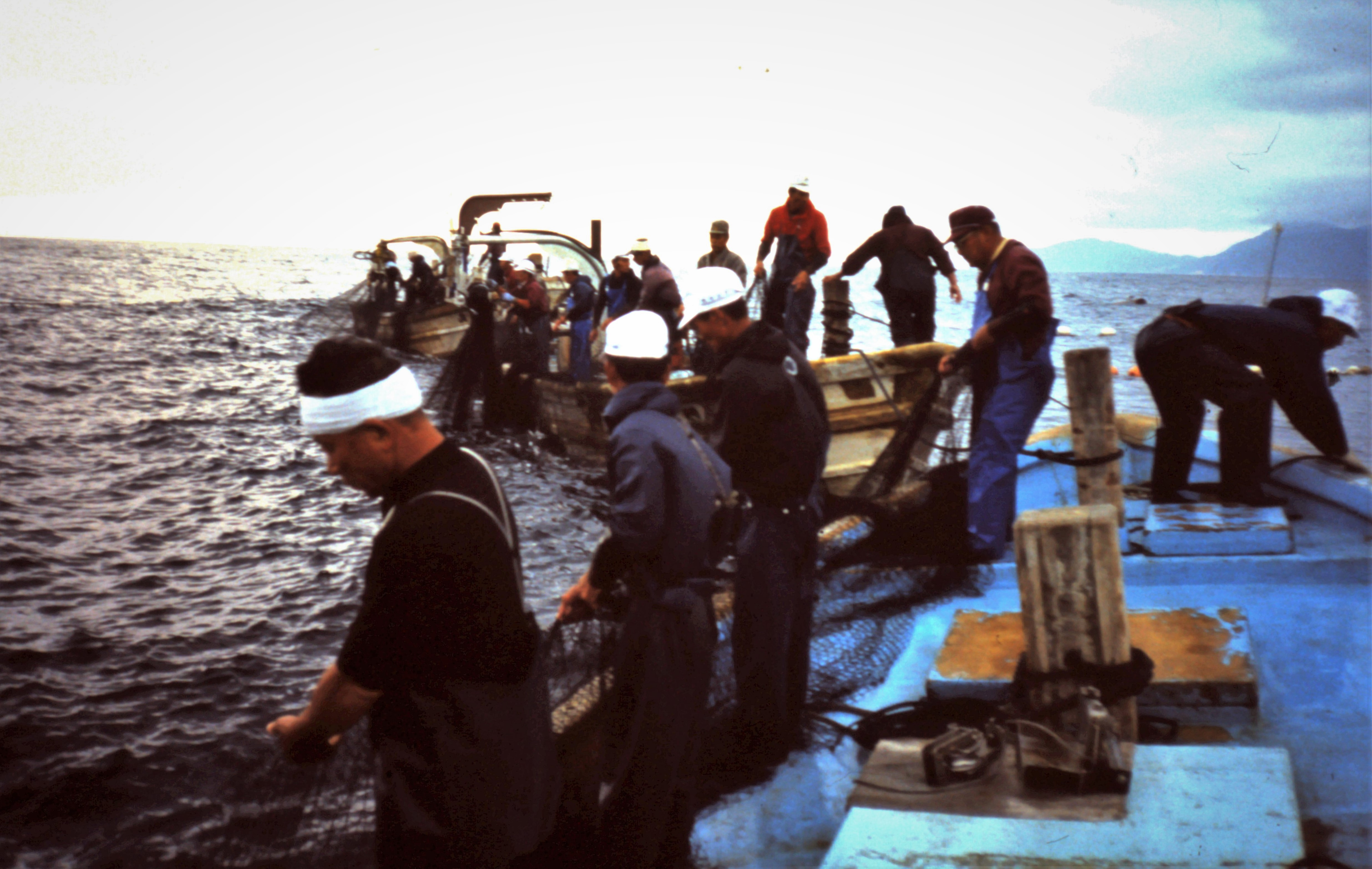
Twice daily, the co-op fishermen pull up nets from the Japan Sea, in Fukui Prefecture, Japan

A fishery cooperative, or fishing co-op, is a cooperative in which the people involved in the fishing industry pool resources, in their certain activities from farming, catching, distribution, and marketing of fish.

Fishing cooperatives encompass a spread of all different fish. Through cooperatives, fisherman are allotted specific amount of fish to ensure one group isn't hogging all the catch. Fishing cooperatives then partner with a distributor so they always have a larger company to buy and sell their fish.

== Types ==
A fishery cooperative can be a "marketing cooperative" that pools resources for the sale of marine products caught by individual fishermen, or "supply cooperatives" that are involved in raising and releasing fish eggs, sharing a fish farm, and operating a larger fishing vessel.

== Fishery cooperatives in the world ==
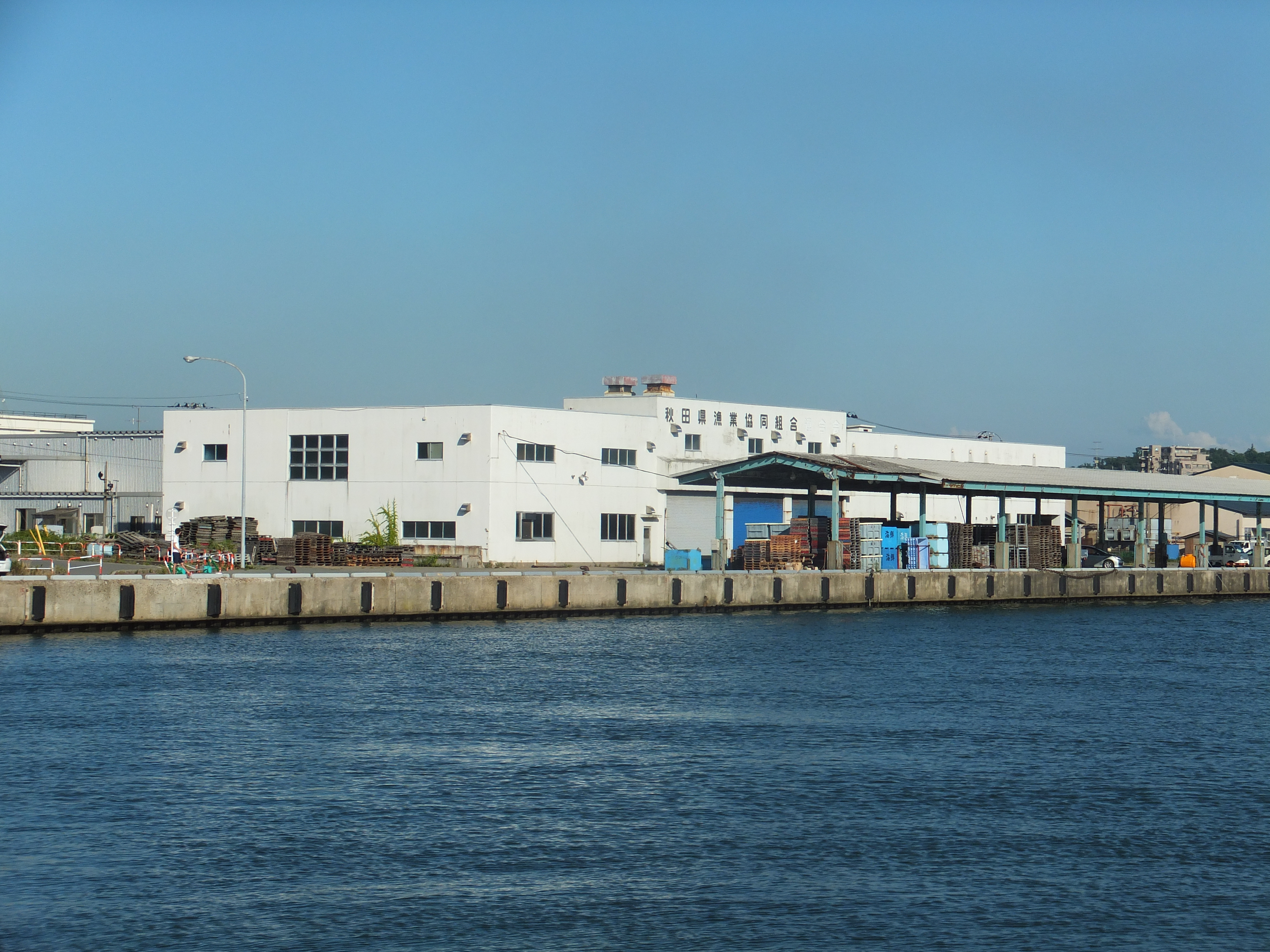
The headquarters of the Fishery Cooperative of Akita Prefecture, in Akita City, Japan

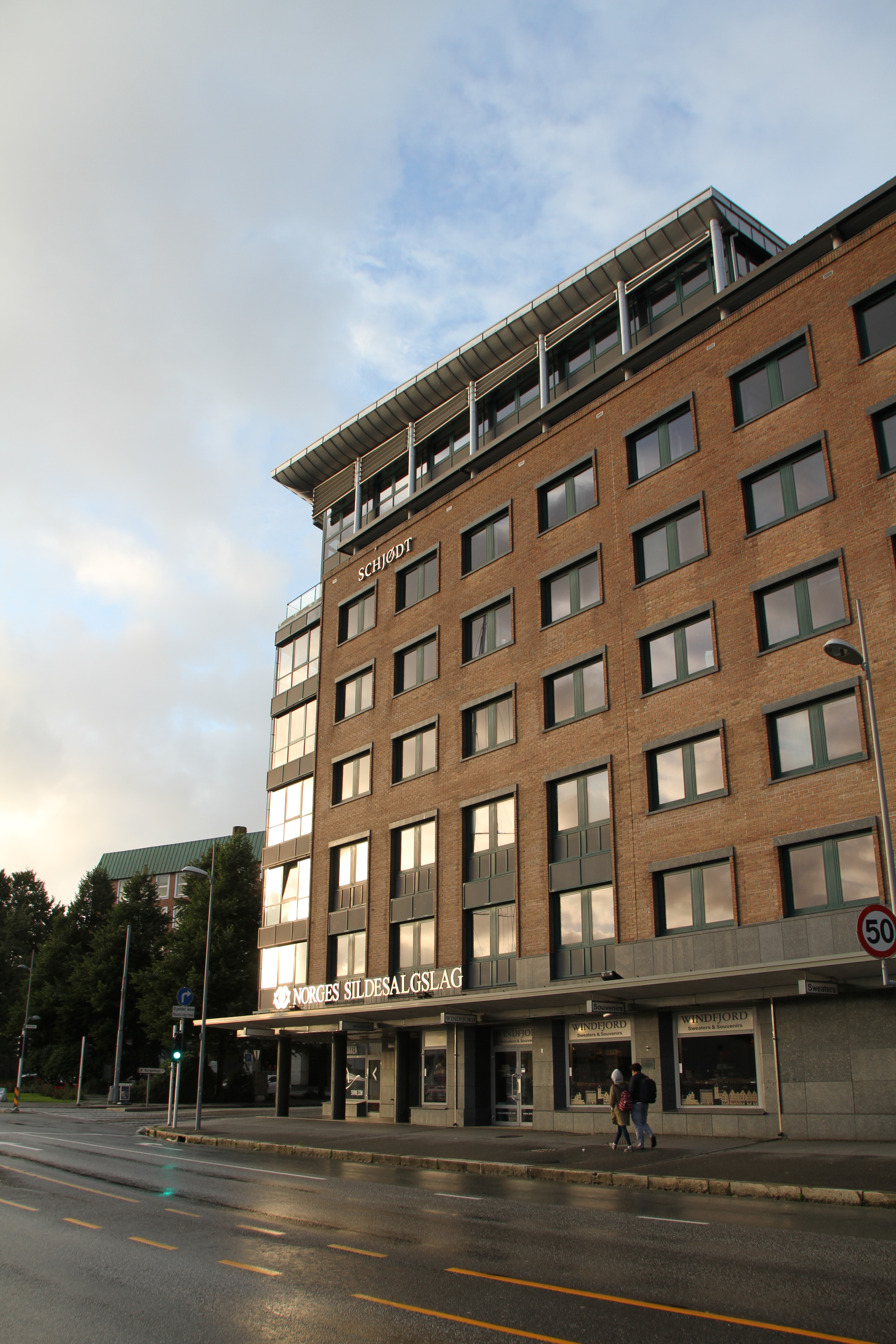
The Bergen headquarters of the Norges Sildesalgslag, the fishery cooperative of Norway

=== Costa Rica ===
==== CoopeTárcoles ====
In Costa Rica, the fishery cooperative of CoopeTárcoles was founded in 1985. The community of Tárcoles has historically depended on artisanal fishing practices, and artisanal fishing represents both an economic cornerstone and a local identity. Prior to the formation of CoopeTárcoles, fish populations in this region were on the decline due to unsustainable fishing methods and pollution. This severely impacted the fishing community economically, an issue compounded by competition both for resources and markets with industrial fishers. To address these problems, the artisanal fishers of Tárcoles formed a united front and agreed to adopt sustainable fishing techniques. This provides representation for the fishing community and ensures the long-term economic viability of their livelihoods. The organization was founded as the Fishers' Cooperative of Tárcoles R.L., later shortened to CoopeTárcoles.

In 2003, CoopeTárcoles established a "Code of Responsible Fishing" based on the "Code of Conduct for Responsible Fisheries" published by the Food and Agriculture Organization of the United Nations. This code represents guidelines to be adopted voluntarily by cooperative members.

The primary fish caught by participants in the organization are white snook (centropomus viridis), seabass (cynoscion sp.), snapper (lutjanus guttatus), and sharptooth smooth-hound shark (mustelus dorsalis).

In January 2009, the Marine Area of Responsible Artisanal Fishing of Tárcoles was legally recognized. This provides a legal basis for the community fishing guidelines already established by CoopeTárcoles.

As of 2012, the cooperative consists of 35 members: thirty men and five women.

CoopeTárcoles has developed the largest fishing database among small-scale Costa Rican fishing communities. This database, established in 2006, records information about the fishing activities of individual fishers, and provides valuable analysis for fishers to maximize their efficiency. Additionally, it has assisted in the monitoring of fish population levels, and is used to observe the impact of different fishing practices on fish populations. The National Institute of Fishing and Aquaculture of Costa Rica (INCOPESCA) has legally recognized this database for use in collaboration between the cooperative and the government.

=== India ===
In India, many fishermen are socially poor, and there are 14,620 fishing cooperatives in various places. At the top of these cooperatives is the "National Federation of Fishermen's Cooperatives" (FISHCOPFED).

=== Japan ===
In Japan, surrounded by the seas on all sides, the modern fishery cooperatives (漁業協同組合 in Japanese) have been set up in each fishing village and town after the Fisheries Cooperative Law enacted in 1948, and are grouped at the national level by JF Zengyoren (全漁連).

=== Norway ===
In Norway, from two fisheries associations that began in 1926/1928, six offshore fish cooperatives were formed in 1936, called Norges Sildesalgslag, through which seafood is sold.

=== Russia ===
In Russia, the Lenin Fishery Kolkhoz, a fishery cooperative, in Kamchatka, celebrates its 90th anniversary in 2019 since its establishment in 1929 and is thriving.

=== United Kingdom ===
Scotland, surrounded by abundant fishing grounds, has a commercial fishery cooperative called Scottish Seas. It exports, among other activities, marine products (such as haddock, saithe and cod) to Europe and North America, making sure they meet the seafood standards set by the United States Department of Commerce's National Marine Fisheries Service or the international Marine Stewardship Council.

In Brighton, England, an attempt was made in 2013–14 to establish a community-supported fishery cooperative called Catchbox to enable sustainable fishing. Cooperative members benefited from low prices (a flat rate of £6/kg) but had no choice as to the species delivered, thus encouraging dietary experimentation and diversification, and reducing wasted catch.

=== United States ===
In the United States, since the Fishermen's Collective Marketing Act of 1934, many fishery cooperatives have been formed.

==== Alaska ====
Fishing cooperatives have made it possible for fishermen to collectively harvest, price, and sell their catch. Alaska is home to several different fishing cooperatives which has helped distribute the harvest and production amongst members in efforts to keep the fishing industry a monopsony. There are different cooperatives for different species of fish and different harvesting locations, and they aim to de-monetize the fishing sector of a particular area which pertains to markets at the national and global level. They also promote sustainable practices.

Alaska is the lead producer of seafood within the United States and inhibits the country's largest fisheries. Within these fisheries are seafood cooperatives and the largest one in the United States is the Seafood Producers Cooperative. It was established in 1944 with the original name of the Halibut Producer Cooperative and it was mainly supplying the military because Halibut was very nutrient rich. It later changed the name to Seafood Producer Cooperative as the nutritional value of halibut shifted due to environmental change and they broadened the species harvested. It currently has 525 fishing members and harvests hook and line caught albacore tuna, halibut, sablefish, salmon and rockfish. This cooperative ensures consumers have the option to buy from certified sustainable fisheries.

In Alaska, the objective of fishing cooperatives is to equally distribute all aspects of the fishing market. The United States congress implemented a pilot program in 2003 in the Central Gulf of Alaska called the Rockfish Cooperative Program to protect fishing communities and jobs by expanding fishing privileges. This program focused on the primary species, secondary species, and one prohibited species in which fisheries are allotted a fixed amount for accidental catch. It was implemented to help stabilize the market in Kodiak, Alaska.

This Rockfish Cooperative program includes catcher vessel's and catcher-processor vessels who sell to a contracted buyer. By creating this program, competition amongst harvesters has been drastically reduced due to quotas and restrictions, and safe, high-quality standards have been put in place on the economic side. This cooperatives' primary purchaser is the International Seafoods of Alaska (ISA). In 2018, this program consisted of 8 owners and member vessels in which 5 of them actively fished during the season.

The Alaska Pollock fishery is economically one of the biggest fisheries in the United States. This fishery includes the Pollock Conservation catcher-processor vessel Cooperative (PCC), High Seas Catcher-vessel Cooperative (HSCC), Mothership Fleet Cooperative, and Seven inshore catcher vessel cooperative. 10% of the fishery is allotted to the QDC, and the remaining is divided up 50% for the inshore sector, 40% for the catcher-processor sector, and 10% for the Mothership Fleet sector.

The Alaska Weathervane Scallop Cooperative was formed in 2000 and there are 6 permit holders within this catcher-processor cooperative. Two to three vessels fish each year.

The Chignik Salmon Cooperative was composed of catcher-vessels. It was formed in 2002 in response to a decline of the Salmon market. This Cooperative only stayed active until 2005 when the Supreme Court found them in violation of Alaska's entry fishery program.^{[13]} During the time this cooperative was active, it was responsible for more than 75% of the Chignik permits and sent out around 20 fishing vessels each year.

Reduction of fishing vessels 2001–2011
| Name of cooperative | Year started | Reduction of active fishing vessels (%) |
|---|---|---|
| PCC & HSCP | 1999 | 42 |
| Pollock mothership | 2000 | 26 |
| Pollock inshore C-V | 2000 | 16 |
| Weathervane scallop | 2000 | 56 |
| Chignik salmon | 2002 | 77 |

These cooperatives give small fishing vessels the ability to maintain a viable business without facing big corporations. Alaskan fishing cooperatives have rules and regulations regarding quota and bycatch so each member has equal opportunity. They all have purchaser contracts which ensures each member can sell their allotted harvest. By partnering with purchasers, cooperatives also promote a more sustainable food production system and aim to spread the profit amongst each member.

== Community benefits of implementing fishing cooperatives ==
One of the main objective of a fishing cooperative is to create a fair distribution of the fishery while also ensuring this resource pool provides economic benefits and a sustainable food source. The importance of this resource pool providing a socioeconomic Environmental factor (link to socioeconomic drivers) benefit while also ensuring this resource is managed correctly speaks highly on the impact of human dimensions of fishing cooperatives. Human dimensions of change emphasizes the idea of anthropogenic factors playing a primary role in climate change. With this being said, the resource pool of a fishery can be sustained by humans if managed properly. Boserup's theory of "no natural carrying capacity" should be recognized by fishing cooperatives. What Boserup means by "no natural carrying capacity" is that there are fundamental human methods that can ensure any natural resource can be used sustainable, but not over exploited. Boserup believes that to obtain the highest sustainable yield of a resource there must be an focus on technology as well as physical, human, and social capital. The contrary idea to this argument must also be explored, by considering a carrying capacity for fisheries. Carrying capacity This needs to be considered for fishing cooperatives in case of poor management, the lack of technological advances or environmental concerns like ocean warming, acidification, or rising sea levels. One method humans are trying to implement into fisheries to ensure the sustainably of the shared resource pool is to create incentives for effective governance. To do this, fishery departments can turn to a higher level of governance and inform them on the fishery in hopes that they implement fishery management into their planning.

Furthermore, if seeking aid from higher levels of governance isn't feasible, fisheries can manage their resource pool by a community level knowledge and practice of managing the commons. The tragedy of the commons is the idea that a commonly shared resource is being exploited by multiple entities to the point of exhaustion. With this being said, if fisheries all make their coop members comply to this idea of ensuring a fair distribution and importance of not over-exploiting, the fisheries will have a more sustainable resource pool. For fishing cooperatives, most issues dealing with the tragedy of the commons can be controlled by within, without the help from governmental oversight. Tragedy of the commons#Non-governmental solution In addition, when fisheries decide to be self-governing they can obtain additional benefits. Fishing cooperatives have access to fishing permits, subsidies, and fishing gear. To obtain these benefits, fishers don't pay out of pocket. Instead, stakeholders are willing to grant these permits, loans, and subsidies in trade for the labor they provide. Furthermore, fisheries provide other benefits such as: providing monetary opportunities to impoverished coastal communities, availability of information and training about the fishery, and education about the fishery regulations. All of these benefits are important to consider when a community is planning to create a fishing cooperative because it can boost the community from within. This is especially true in developing communities because fishing cooperatives need fishers to gather this resource, so these communities can provide employment opportunities for their people.

This idea of creating fisheries in developing communities for its economic benefit was implemented in two Mexican communities. These two neighboring communities use the same harvesting methods and share the ecosystem. However, these two communities had different policy implications that greatly distinguished the productivity of the two fisheries. One community stuck to a permit system that allowed any fisher with proper licensing to fish with loose regulations on over-exploitation. With this being said, this community has dealt with issues of species scarcity and over-exploitation because of the lack of regulation. However, the other community switched over to a common property-right organization with the goal of avoiding over-exploitation of the fishery. The main principles of this new approach assigned rules and regulations to what fishers can and can't fish in this area and what fish can and can't be harvested at certain times. This approach requires community wide action to ensure the development and sustainability of the fishery because everyone in the community relies on this resource pool and wants it to be available for as long as possible.

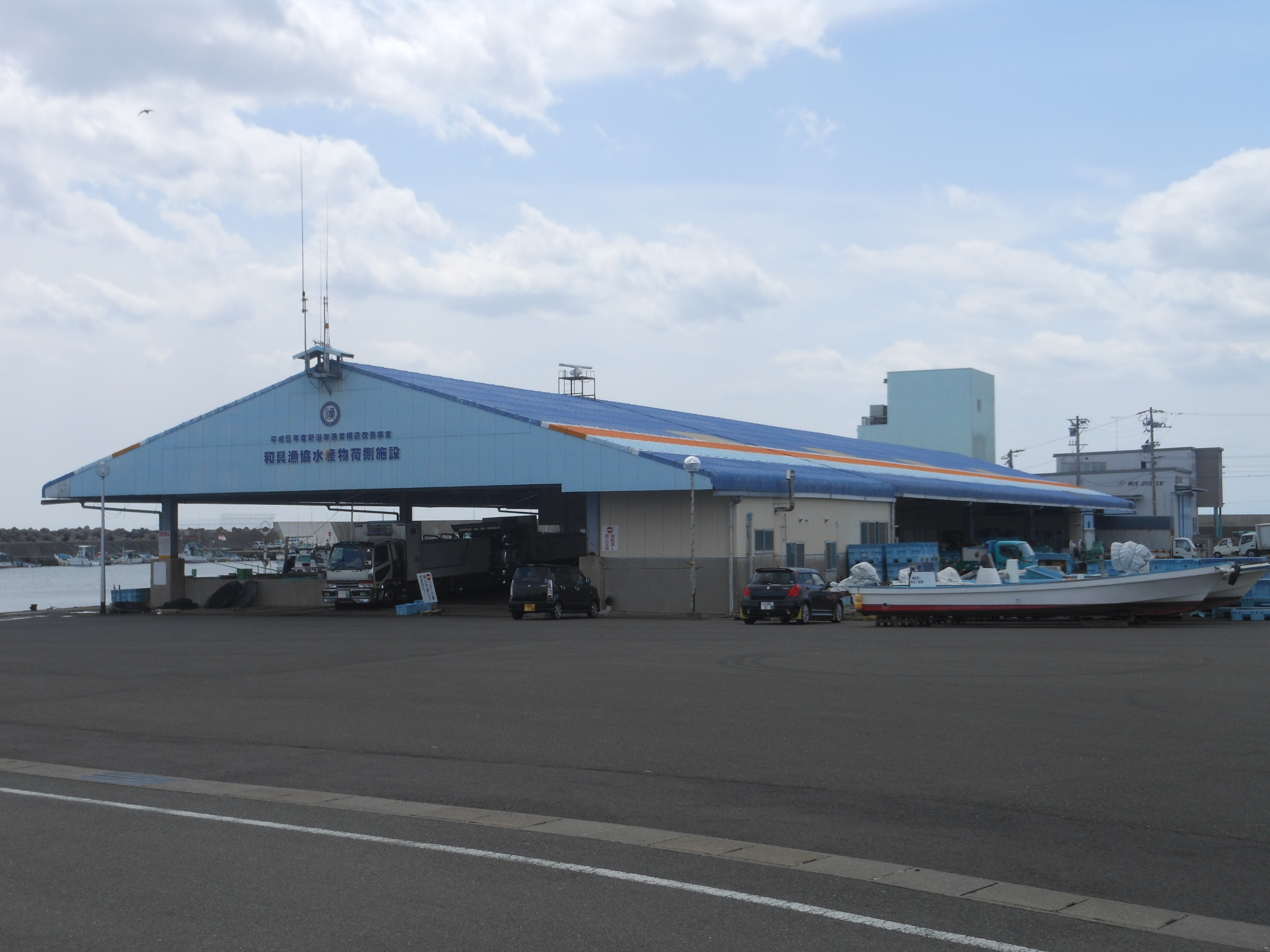

In conclusion, fishing cooperatives are most productive when there is a community wide knowledge and involvement of the fishery. Fishing cooperatives that choose to be self-governed are more capable of mitigating the chance of over-exploitation due to this community engagement. These types of fishing co-operatives are becoming widely used all over the world in response climate change and its effects on our planet.

== See also ==
- Fishing industry
- Cooperative
