= Hydra Bay =

Bay in South Africa

- Hydrabaai (Afrikaans)
- Location in South Africa
- Coordinates: 34.6083°S 19.3246°E
- Ocean/sea sources: Southern Atlantic Ocean
- Basin countries: South Africa
- Max. length: 1.6 km (0.99 mi)
- Max. width: 0.4 km (0.25 mi)
- Settlements: Near Van Dyks Bay

Hydra Bay (Afrikaans: Hydrabaai), also known as Romansbaai, is a bay in South Africa near the settlement of Van Dyks Bay.

== Geography ==
Hydra Bay is an open bay of the South Atlantic Ocean lying 3 km to the northeast of the Danger Point Lighthouse. The bay is facing west, with a fine beach in its central part.
