= Pearly Beach =

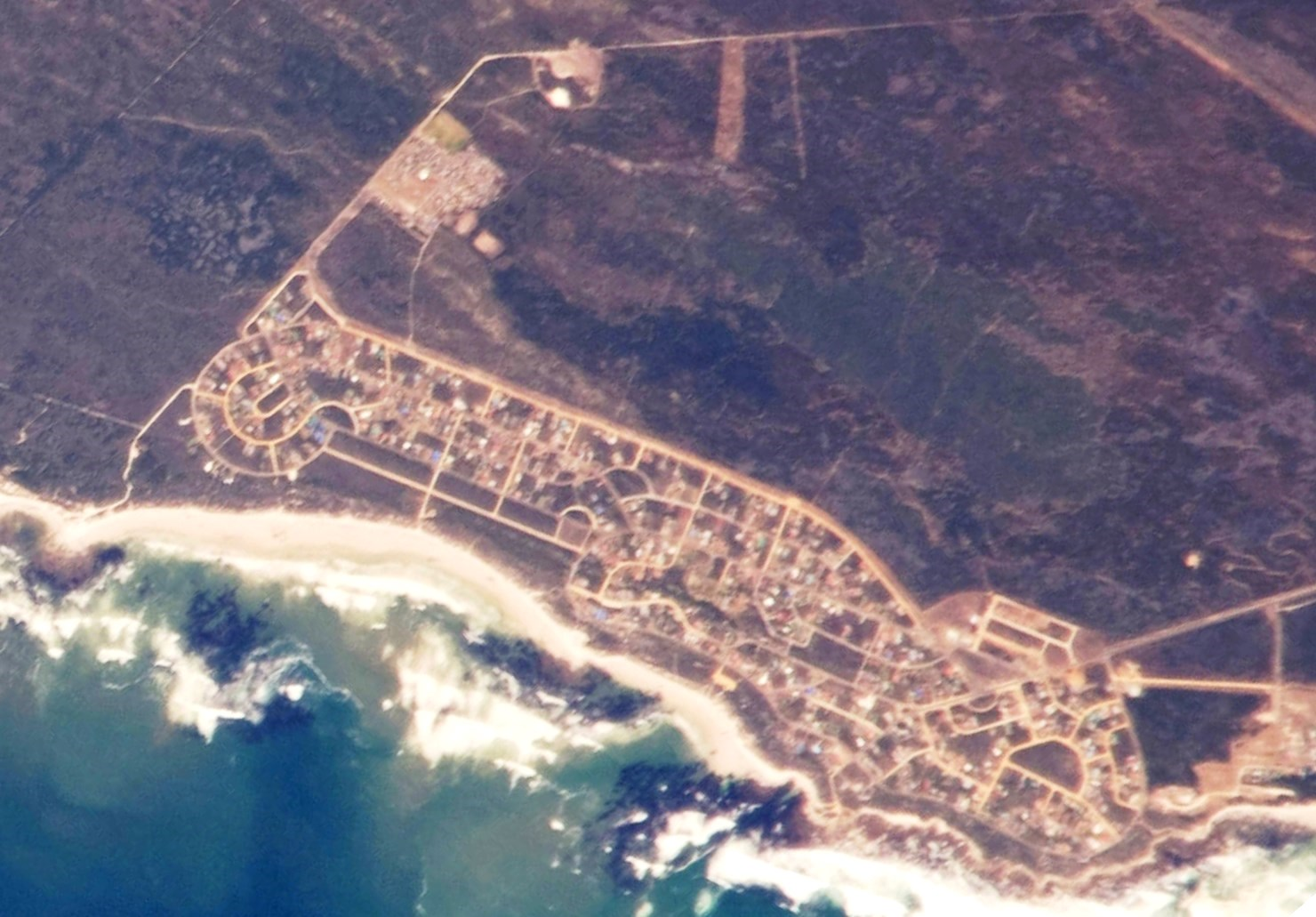
- Imaged from the ISS

- Location within Western Cape Location within South Africa
- Coordinates: 34.665°S 19.501°E
- Country: South Africa
- Province: Western Cape
- District: Overberg
- Municipality: Overstrand

Area
  - Total: 3.92 km^{2} (1.51 sq mi)

Population (2011)
  - Total: 1,042
  - Density: 266/km^{2} (688/sq mi)

Racial makeup (2011)
  - Black African: 48.2%
  - Coloured: 11.9%
  - White: 39.0%
  - Other: 0.9%

First languages (2011)
  - Afrikaans: 45.5%
  - Xhosa: 44.3%
  - English: 9.1%
  - Other: 1.1%
- Time zone: UTC+2 (SAST)
- Postal code (street): 7220
- PO box: 7221
- Area code: 028

Pearly Beach is a village in Overberg District Municipality in the Western Cape Province of South Africa.

An area where the southern right whale (Eubalaena australis) comes to calve and mate along its migratory route (June – October). These whales can be seen with their young all along the coastline with Walker Bay just a short distance away. The area is home to the threatened African oystercatcher which can be seen on the rocky coasts, beaches and at lagoons eating limpets and mussels. It is close to Bantamsklip which was a proposed site of a nuclear power station. However, Thyspunt in the Eastern Cape seems to be the most likely location.

== Geography ==
Not far from Pearly Beach is Dyer Island, a breeding colony for jackass penguins. Not far from Dyer Island is Geyser Island, a breeding ground for Cape fur seals. As the area around these islands teems with an abundance of sea life, it has become a notorious feeding ground for the great white shark which frequents its waters in large numbers. Dyer Island is named after Samson Dyer, an American who came to the Cape in 1806, and who lived on Dyer Island where he collected guano for fertilizer.
