= Mons A. Kårbø =

Norwegian politician

Mons Andreas Andersen Kårbø (3 December 1881 – 26 December 1964) was a Norwegian leader of fishing organizations and politician for the Liberal Party. He played a central role in postwar academic and economic organization of the Norwegian fishing industry.

== Biography ==
He was born at Kårbø in Herlø Municipality (later spelled Herdla) in Søndre Bergenhus county, Norway. He was a son of farmers. He later worked as a fisher and farmer based at Kårbø, and took over the farm in 1909.

From 1910 to 1913 and 1916 to 1940 he was a member of the municipal council of Herdla Municipality, serving as mayor from 1919 to 1934. He was a deputy representative to the Parliament of Norway in the terms 1925–1927, 1928–1930 and 1937–1945, and was elected as a regular representative in 1930 and 1933.

From 1922 to 1925 he was the bank director of Hordabanken. From 1926 to 1932 he was the chairman of Norges Fiskarlag, and after a period when he doubled as chairman of Stor- og vårsildlaget from 1928 to 1932, he worked as inspector of fisheries in Western Norway from 1932 to 1936. In 1936 he was hired as director of Norges Sildesalgslag, into which Stor- og vårsildlaget had merged. In 1945 he became the director of Norges Bank in Bergen. From 1946 he was a member of Norges Eksportråd. He left Noregs Sildesalslag in 1951, and died in late 1964. He had been decorated with the Royal Norwegian Order of St. Olav.

== Other sources ==
- Johansen, K.E. (1990). Mons A. Kårbø – eit lite portrett av ein stor fiskarhovding (in Norwegian). Bergen: Fiskarsoge frå Hordaland.
