= Danger Point Lighthouse =

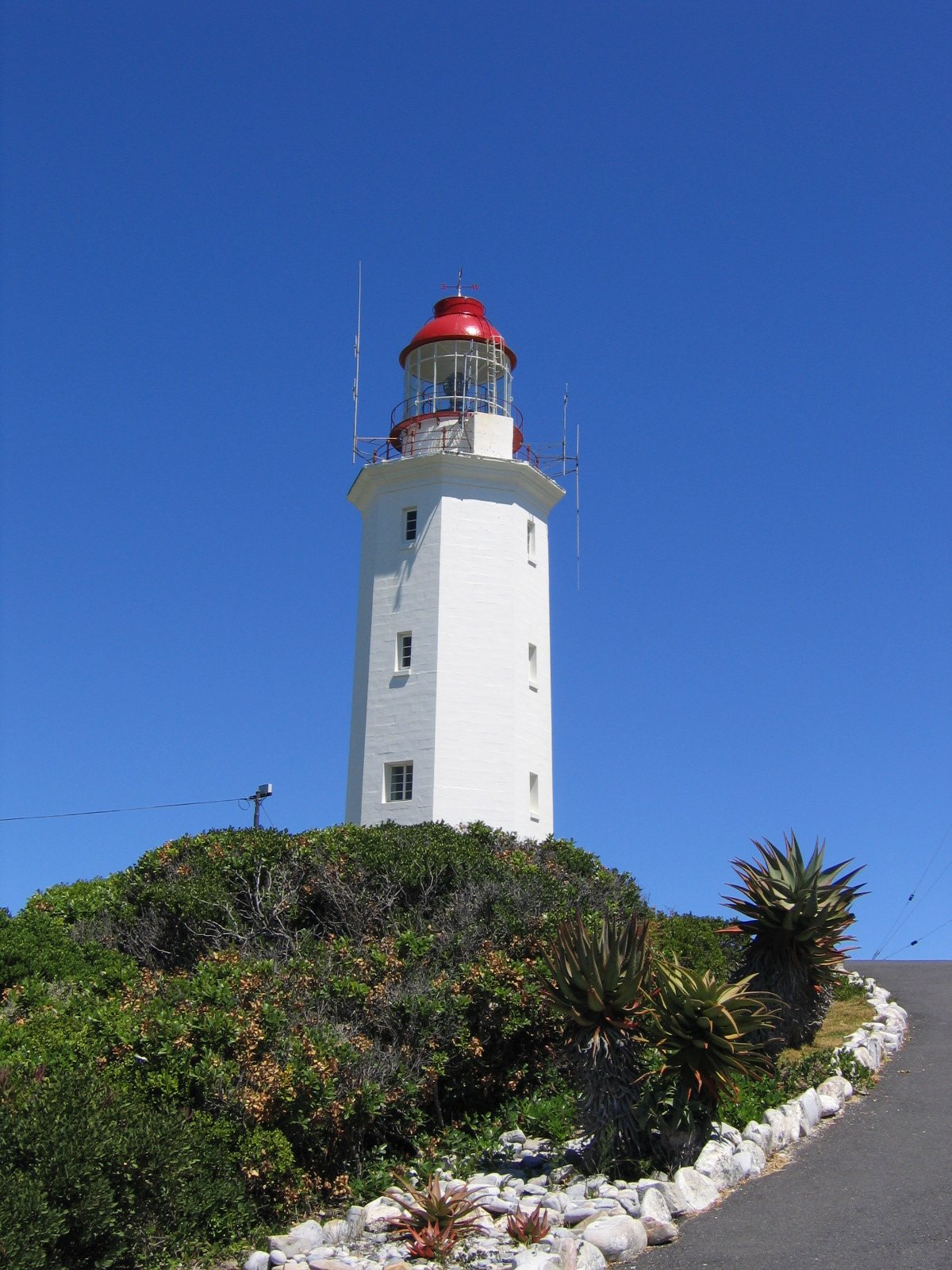
- Location: Van Dyk's Bay; Western Cape; South Africa
- Coordinates: 34°37′49.0″S 19°18′08.9″E

Tower
- Constructed: 1895
- Construction: masonry tower
- Height: 17 metres (56 ft)
- Shape: octagonal tower with balcony and lantern
- Markings: white tower, red lantern
- Power source: mains electricity

Light
- First lit: 1 January 1895
- Focal height: 45 metres (148 ft)
- Intensity: 1,700,000 cd
- Range: 27 nautical miles (50 km; 31 mi)
- Characteristic: LFl(3) W 40s

Danger Point Lighthouse is a lighthouse on the southern point of Walker Bay, near Gansbaai, in South Africa. It is a white octagonal masonry tower that has been in use since 1895.

== History ==
Bartolomeu Dias originally named Danger Point Ponte de Sao Brandao when he landed there on May 16, 1488. The name Danger Point is derived from the treacherous reefs and rocks below the water that make it very dangerous for ships to sail close to the coast. The area is also known for the many great white sharks that are found here.

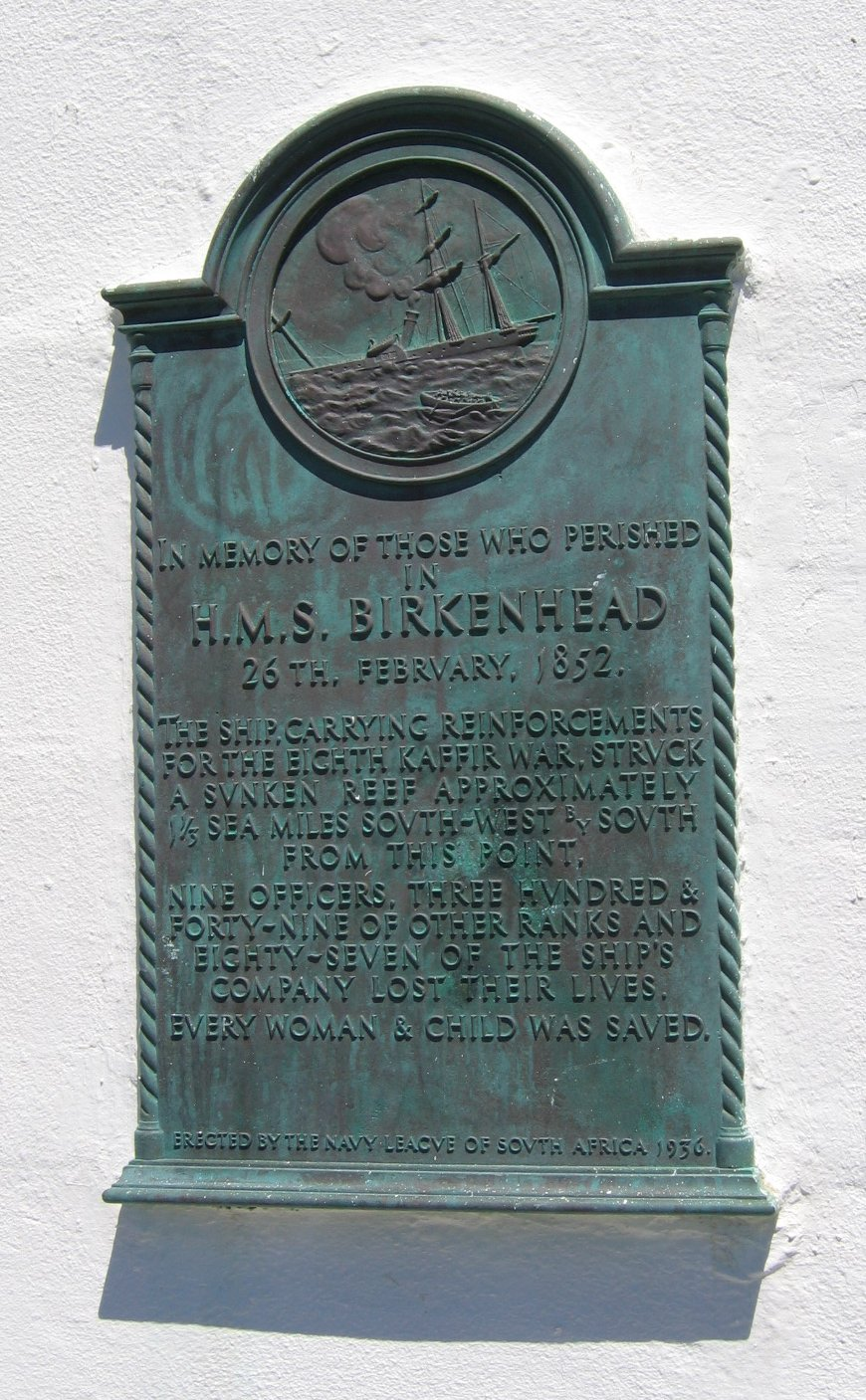
Plaque commemorating the sinking of the Birkenhead, affixed to the Danger Point lighthouse.

More than 140 ships have been wrecked and thousands of lives lost between Danger Point and Cape Infanta, to the east of Gansbaai. The troopship HMS Birkenhead was wrecked off Danger Point in 1852. A barely visible rock (now aptly named Birkenhead Rock) 1.679 kilometres (1.043 mi) from Danger Point, was fatal for the troopship carrying young Welsh and Scottish soldiers and their officers and family on their way to Eastern Cape to fight the Xhosa. The Birkenhead became famous because it was the first shipwreck where the "women and children first" protocol was applied. All women and children were saved but most of the men perished. There were only 193 survivors. In 1895, the Danger Point Lighthouse was built, providing more security for the ships in these dangerous waters.

A lighthouse commission of 1890 stressed the need for a light at Danger Point and in May 1892 engineer W T Douglass submitted a report on a lighthouse at Danger Point. The light was first exhibited on 1 January 1895. The octagonal structure is 18.3 m (60 ft) tall and emits three beams of light every forty seconds.

== See also ==
- Hydra Bay
- List of lighthouses in South Africa
- List of heritage sites in South Africa
