= Norges Sildesalgslag =

Norwegian seafood sales organization

Norges Sildesalgslag (Norwegian Herring Sales Association) is a national sales organization for the sale of pelagic fish. The pelagic sector forms an important part of the seafood industry, which is Norway's second largest export trade.

== History ==
Noregs Sildesalslag originated as an association of herring fishermen which was formed in 1936 with the merger of two fishing associations: Storsildlaget, which dated to 1926, and Stor- og Vårsildlaget, which dated from 1928. The first director of Noregs Sildesalslag was Mons A. Kårbø who served until 1951. Kårbø had previously been chairman and president of the sales board of Stor- og Vårsildlaget.

Norges Sildesalgslag is owned and operated by Norwegian fishermen. Norges Sildesalgslag has a central role in all sales which are carried out through electronic auction. Both Norwegian and foreign fishermen sell their fish through this association, which is open for bids from Norwegian and foreign buyers. The fishing fleet consists of 600 - 800 vessels.

Annually approximately 2 million tons of pelagic fish are sold through Norges Sildesalgslag. This corresponds to 2 - 2.5% of the total global wild fish catch. Catch data are instantly reported for governmental bodies, providing high quality input for resource control purposes. The main fish species that are traded are herring and mackerel. The first-hand value of this volume depends in the international market and amounts to 4-6 billion NOK or 500-700 million Euro annually. The export value amounts to 5-6 billion NOK.

== Other sources ==
- Johannessen, Arne & Magne Misje (2002) Rott jer sammen : Norges sildesalgslag 1927-2002 (Bergen: Norges Sildesalgslag)
- Sjølset, Ellen & Thorvaldsen, Linda Therese (1998) Balansert økonomistyring i Norges sildesalgslag (Bergen: Norges Sildesalgslag)
- Johannessen, Arne (1997) Tradisjon og fornyelse : Norges sildesalgslag 70 år i 1997 (Bergen: Norges Sildesalgslag)
- Johansen, K. E. (1990) Mons A. Kårbø – eit lite portrett av ein stor fiskarhovding (Bergen: Fiskarsoge frå Hordaland
