= Gansbaai =

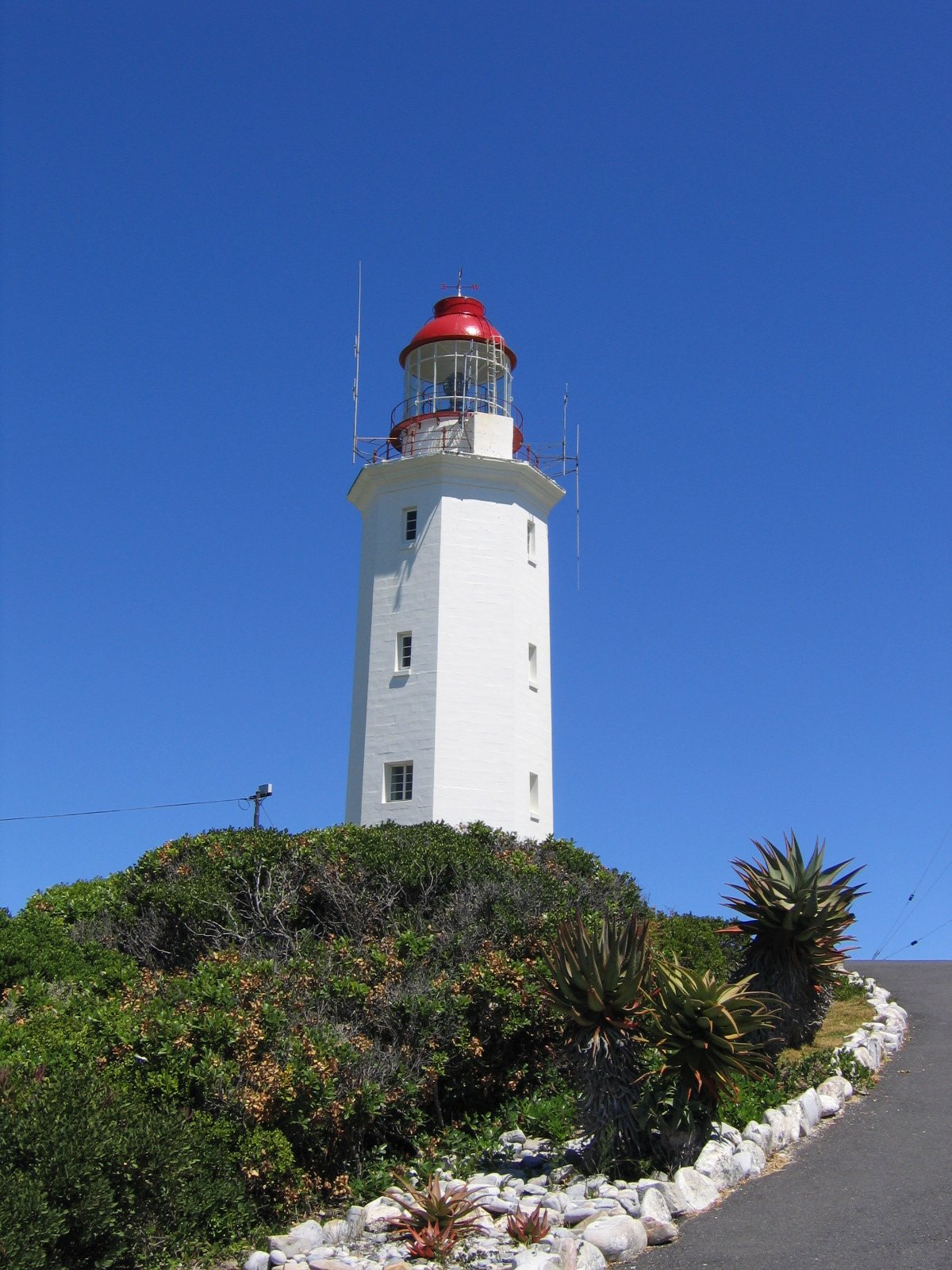
- Danger Point lighthouse near Gansbaai

- Location within Western Cape Location within South Africa
- Coordinates: 34°34′58″S 19°21′8″E
- Country: South Africa
- Province: Western Cape
- District: Overberg
- Municipality: Overstrand

Area
  - Total: 12.44 km^{2} (4.80 sq mi)

Population (2011)
  - Total: 11,598
  - Density: 932.3/km^{2} (2,415/sq mi)

Racial makeup (2011)
  - Black African: 45.2%
  - Coloured: 29.7%
  - Indian/Asian: 0.3%
  - White: 24.5%
  - Other: 0.4%

First languages (2011)
  - Afrikaans: 53.2%
  - IsiXhosa: 39.8%
  - English: 3.5%
  - Sesotho: 1.6%
  - Other: 1.9%
- Time zone: UTC+2 (SAST)
- Postal code (street): 7220
- PO box: 7220
- Area code: 028

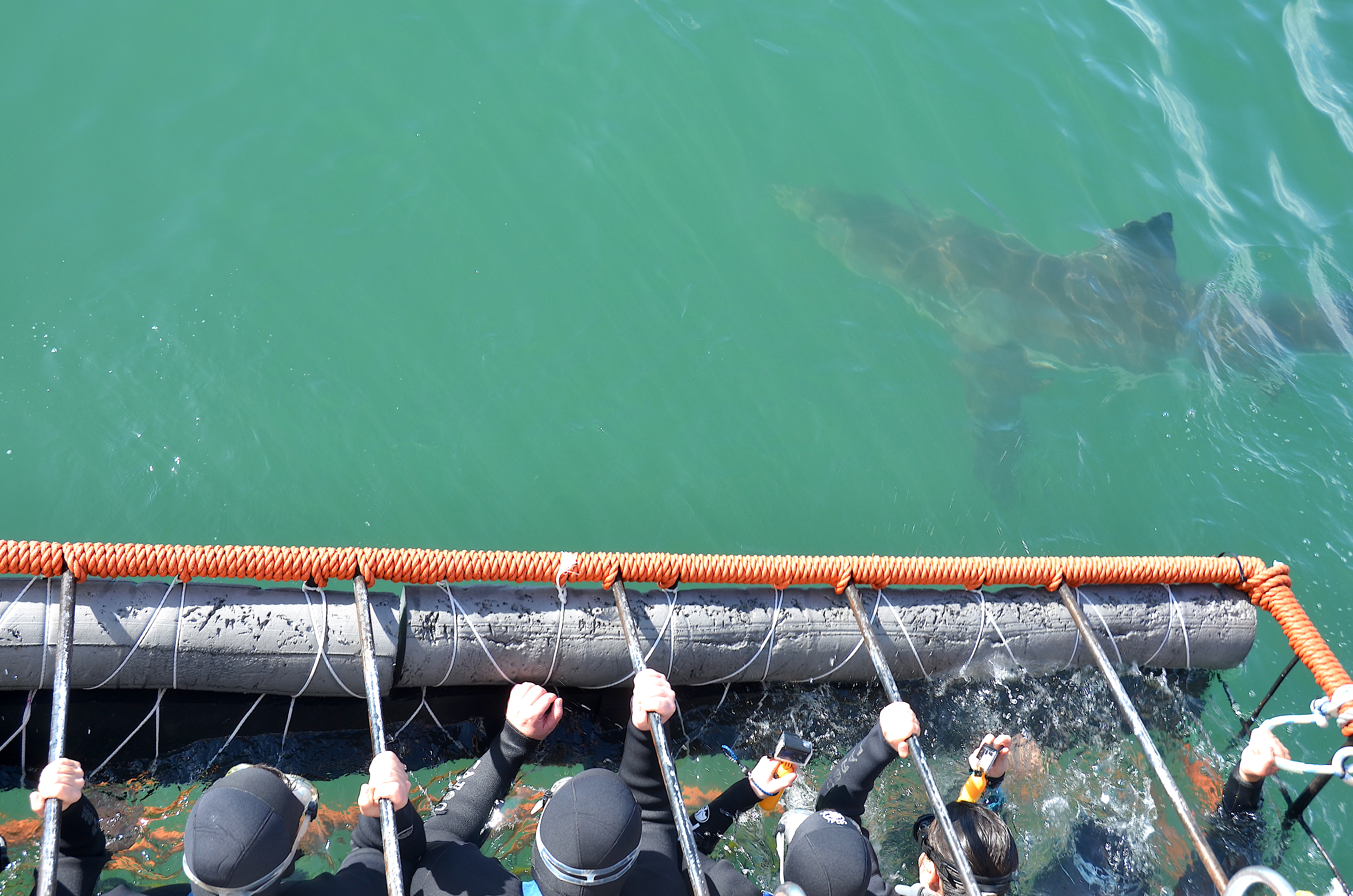
Great white shark cage diving

Gansbaai (Dutch/Afrikaans for "bay of geese," sometimes referred to as Gans Bay) is a fishing town and tourist destination in the Overberg District Municipality, Western Cape, South Africa. It is known for its dense population of great white sharks and as a whale watching location.

The main tourist attraction in Gansbaai since approximately 1995 has been cage diving with great white sharks. It is said that after Kruger National Park, the great white sharks attract some of the highest numbers of tourists to South Africa for any single activity.

== History ==
The earliest evidence of the presence of sheep-herding Khoi people (after the hunter-gatherer-"San", the original indigenous population of the Western Cape) in the Western Cape has been found in Klipgat Cave. Klipgat Cave is located in the Walker Bay Nature Reserve, next to De Kelders, the residential shore area of Gansbaai. As one of only three places in South Africa where such old remains have been excavated, Klipgat Cave is an important historical sites in the Western Cape. The reserve and the cave are open to the public.

Until the first white settlers arrived at the end of the 18th century, the Khoi people thrived in this region. An expedition sent by Jan van Riebeeck to the area described meeting people of the so-called Chainouqua-tribe near Baardskeerdersbos, a rural hamlet, 15 kilometres (9.3 mi) from Gansbaai. The river flowing through the Baardskeerdersbos Valley is still called "Boesmansrivier" (Afrikaans for Bushman's river). "Bushman" is a name commonly used for the San-people, but will in this case have reflected Khoi-people.

It was the people of Khoi-descent who erected the first permanent settlement in the Gansbaai vicinity. In 1811 fishing cottages were built under the dense Milkwood Forests in Stanfords Bay near De Kelders.

The first white settlers in the area were "trekboers" (nomadic farmers). They copied the Khoi herding techniques of using a grazing area until it was exhausted, then moving on to greener pastures. The area was big and fertile enough for such purposes. On many of the large farms around Gansbaai, the old and original homesteads and mudstone houses tell of the days when the white farmers settled down.

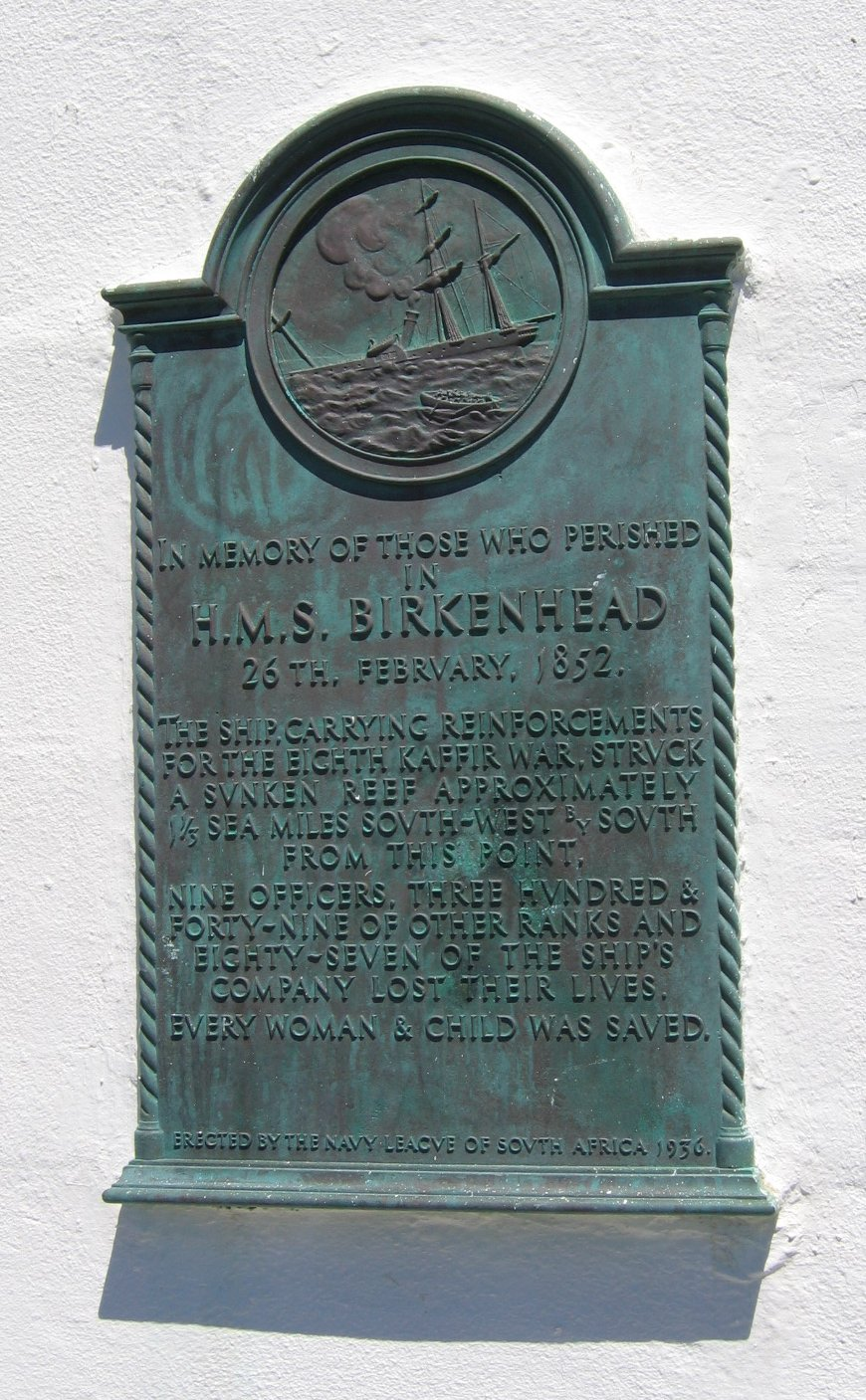
Plaque commemorating the sinking of the Birkenhead, affixed to the Danger Point lighthouse

The troopship HMS Birkenhead was wrecked off Danger Point in 1852. A barely visible rock 2 kilometres (1.2 mi) from Danger Point (now aptly called "Birkenhead Rock") was fatal for the troopship carrying young Welsh, Scottish and English soldiers and their officers and family on their way to Eastern Cape to fight the Xhosa. The Birkenhead became famous because it was the first shipwreck where the "women and children first" protocol was applied. All women and children were saved but 445 of the men, mostly soldiers, perished. Most of the horses swam ashore and were the ancestors of a feral herd that roamed the plains east of Gansbaai until late in the 20th century.

More than 140 ships have been wrecked and thousands of lives lost between Danger Point and Cape Infanta, to the east of Gansbaai. In 1895, the Danger Point Lighthouse was built, providing more security for the ships in these dangerous waters.

Gansbaai was founded, according to local storytellers, in 1881 after 18-year-old fisherman Johannes Cornelis Wessels walked there across the dunes from Stanford and discovered excellent fishing in the area. He settled there, and soon after other families followed suit. The settlers called it "Gansbaai" after the colony of Egyptian geese that gathered at the freshwater fountain in the present-day Gansbaai Harbor. Up until the 20th century, however, it was little more than a simple fishing village due to its isolation and lack of communication with the outside world.

Gansbaai's economy received an economic boost in 1939 when a small factory was built to process sharks' livers for vitamin A and lubricant, which was in great demand during World War II. After the war, however, demand fell and the few years of prosperity were over.

It was not until local school principal Johannes Barnard persuaded village fishermen to set up the first fishery cooperative in South Africa that the economy began to recover. Barnard helped the fishermen obtain capital from the Fisheries Development Corporation, deepen the harbour and establish a modern fish meal factory. It is still believed to be the primary employment generator in Gansbaai and the canning division is the largest of its kind in the Southern Hemisphere. The town became a municipality in 1963.

Today, Gansbaai's economy still revolves around its fishing industry, but an increasingly large part of it now comes from tourism. National Geographic Society film crews and researchers from around the globe visit to study the wildlife including the great white shark and right whale.

The southern right whale can be seen in large numbers, especially from the rocky shores of De Kelders on Walker Bay. This is also the site of an old whaling station. The lookout platform and the steps leading to it are still standing. Today whales are protected in South Africa.

The hinterland is known for its vast mountainous landscapes covered with unspoilt vegetation of the Cape Floristic Region (Fynbos). Despite being the smallest of the world's six floral kingdoms, the Cape Floral Kingdom, with 9000 species, is the richest.

Gansbaai is home to the annual Reforest Fest in Platbos Forest, the southernmost indigenous forest South Africa. The event is focused on therapeutic measures to rehabilitate the ecosystems that were once there. The event, hosted by environmental group Greenpop and Platbos Reserve is focused on environmental action. The Reforest Fest in the Platbos Forest Reserve serves annually as a prime example of the sound wilderness engineering, driven by the social connection of exciting weekend recreation and conservation.

== Dyer Island, Geyser Rock and Shark Alley ==
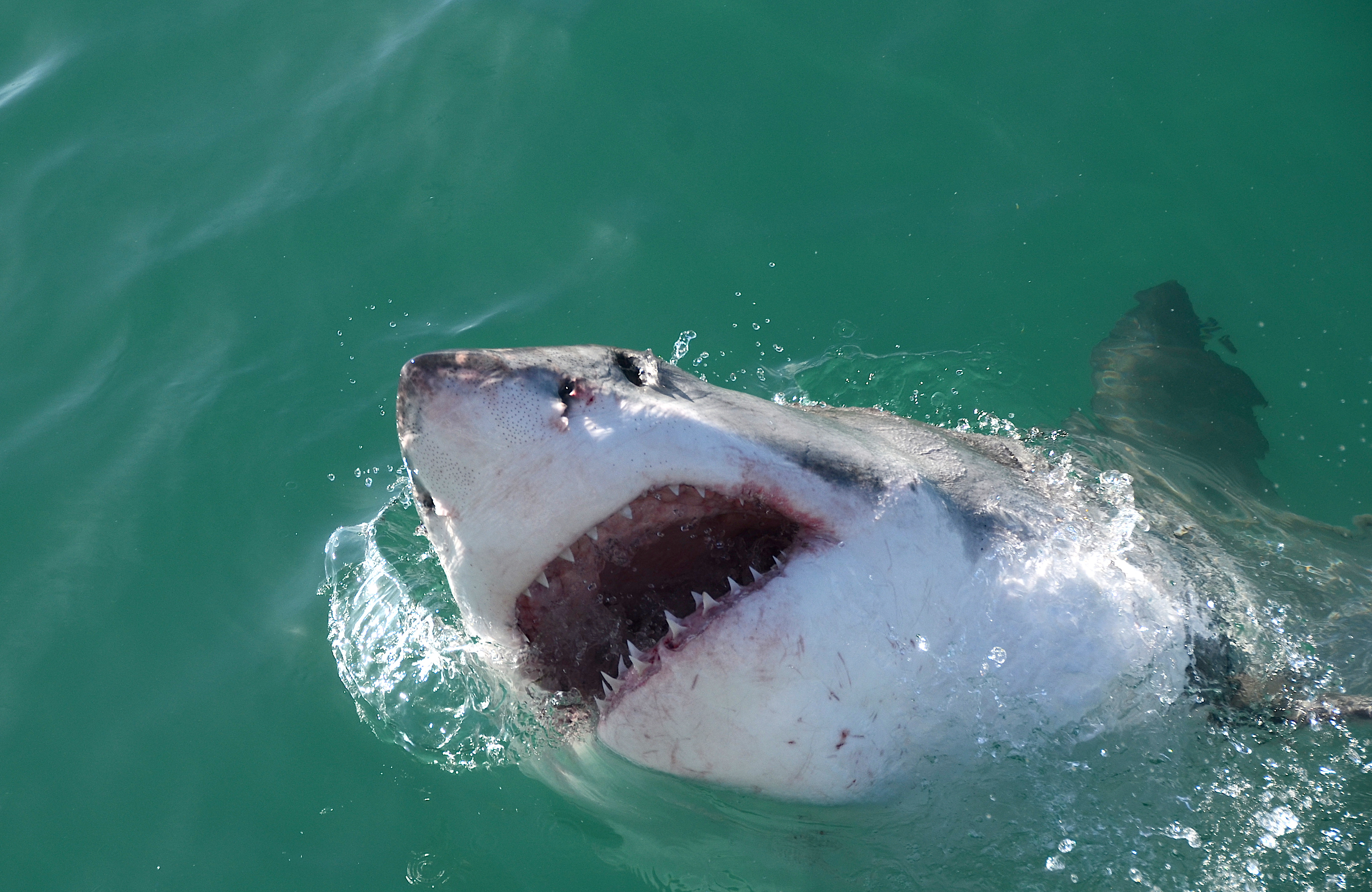
Great white shark near Dyer Island

The original name of Dyer Island was Ilha da Fera (Island of wild creatures), so named by Portuguese seafarers in the 15th century.

Dyer Island is the largest group of islands about 8 kilometres (5.0 mi) offshore from Gansbaai and less than that from Danger Point peninsula. It is named after Samson Dyer, an emigrant from the US to the Cape Colony in 1806, who lived on the island collecting guano, which he sold to mainlanders as fertiliser. The island is home to a declining colony of African penguins (≈ 5000 individuals in 2015).

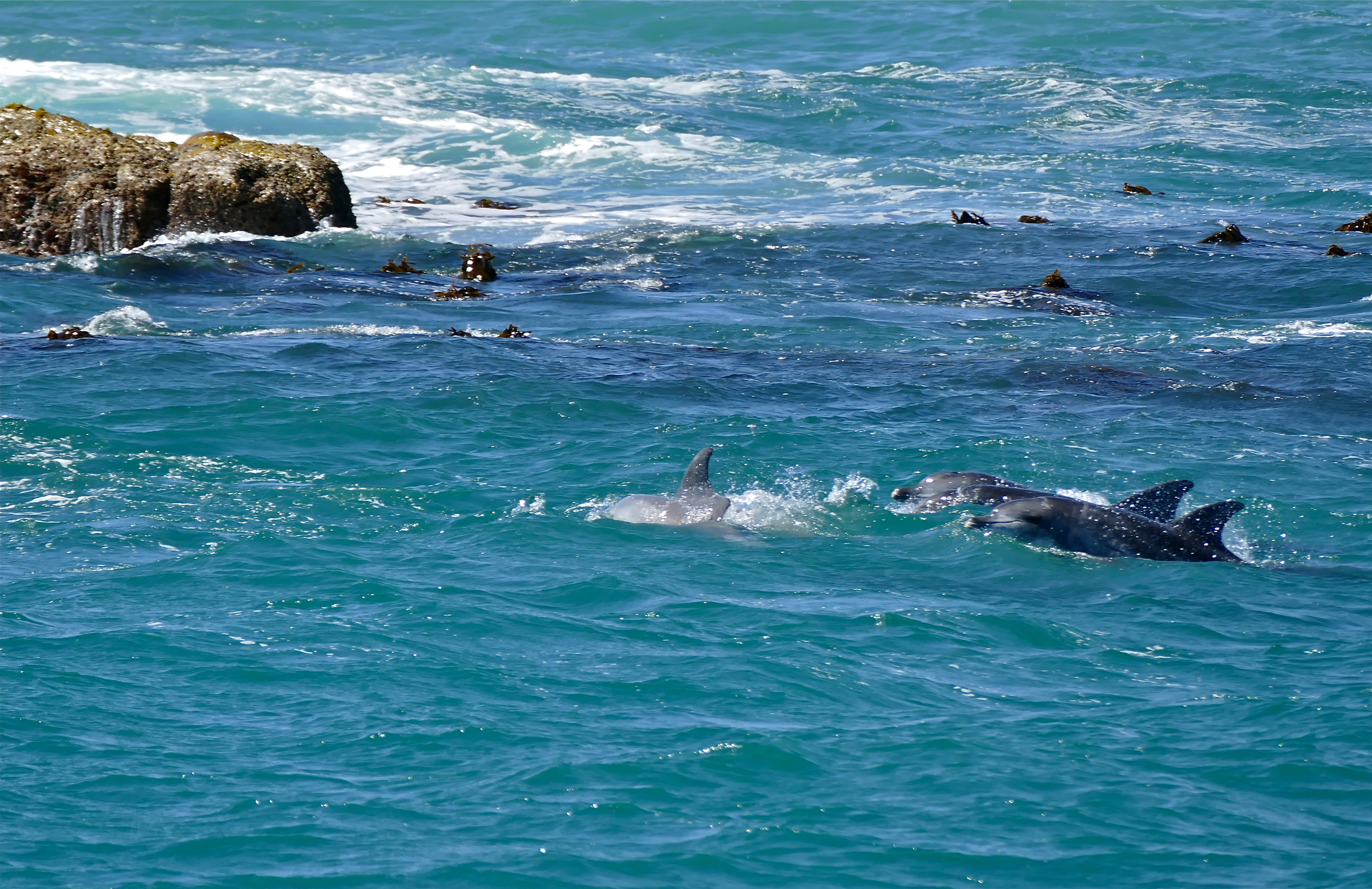
Indo-Pacific Bottlenose dolphins off Geyser Rock

Geyser Rock is a smaller island nearby and is home to around 60,000 brown fur seals.

Dyer Island and Geyser Rock is a nature reserve and cannot be accessed by the general public.

The shallow channel between the two islands is popularly known as Shark Alley.

== Government ==
Gansbaai is located in the Overstrand Local Municipality, which falls within the Overberg District Municipality. The Overstrand council governs the southwestern coast of the Overberg, from Pringle Bay to Pearly Beach; its headquarters are in Hermanus but there is an office in Gansbaai.

== Demographics ==
In the 2011 census, the population of Gansbaai was recorded as 11,598 people, living in an area of 12.4 square kilometres (4.8 sq mi), giving the town a population density of 932.1 inhabitants per square kilometre (2,414/sq mi). 45% of the inhabitants described themselves as "Black African", 30% as "Coloured", and 24% as "White". 53% spoke Afrikaans as their first language, 40% spoke Xhosa, 3% spoke English, and 4% spoke some other language.

== Education ==
There are three public primary schools in Gansbaai:

- Laerskool Gansbaai, an Afrikaans-medium school with approximately 300 students.
- Gansbaai Primêre Skool, an Afrikaans-medium school with approximately 500 students.
- Masakhane Primary School, a Xhosa and English-medium school with approximately 550 students.

A public high school, Gansbaai Academia, was opened in 2010. It has approximately 900 students who are taught in Afrikaans and English.

== See also ==
- List of shipwrecks in South Africa
- List of Islands of South Africa
