= Samson Dyer =

African-American harpooner

- Born: September 9, 1773; Newport, Rhode Island
- Died: 1843 (aged 69–70)
- Occupation: Harpooner

Samson Gabriel Dyer aka Sampson Dyers (9 September 1773 – 1843) was an African-American man noted for his association with Dyer Island off the Cape Agulhas coast of South Africa.

== Biography ==
He was born in Newport, Rhode Island. As a young man Dyer moved to Nantucket where he found work as a boatsteerer on a whaleboat. In 1806 he boarded the vessel "President" bound for Cape Town. After arriving in Cape Town, he was employed by the firm Cloete, Reitz and Anderson as a harpooner for the whaling industry in False Bay. Later he was sent to an unnamed island to prepare sealskins for the company. Here he also gathered guano which he sold as fertiliser to farmers in the Overberg area.

The greater part of the Cape fur seal colony was to be found on neighbouring Geyser Rock. With the guano-boom of the 19th century, guano was removed from Dyer Island regularly until the 1980s. African penguins had previously made nesting holes in the guano, but following removal of the guano, they took to nesting on open ground, making their nests easily accessible to predators such as the kelp gull. The late 19th-century craze for penguin eggs as a delicacy led to unsustainable exploitation until the 1960s. Records show that in 1902 alone 16,400 penguin eggs were collected on Dyer Island. Great white pelicans formerly bred on the island until keepers destroyed the breeding grounds through excessive egg harvesting. Currently Dyer Island is a nature reserve for marine birds and penguin numbers are standing at about 7000. Geyser Rock now supports a colony of some 40,000 fur seals, and consequently the channel between the two islands is a rich hunting ground for great white sharks and is known as Shark Alley.

Dyer applied for British citizenship six years later, and stated to the governor, Sir John Cradock, that he was permanently employed culling seals and had prepared skins of some 24,000 seals over four seasons. In 1813 he married Margaretha Engel, who came from Elim, and was his junior by 18 years. They had 4 children, 2 boys and 2 girls. Dyer was baptized in Caledon at the age of 70.

The date and place of his death are not known.

=== Business ===
Dyer showed great business acumen, and was considered a very rich and respected man in the Overberg. Alexander Johnstone Jardine (1790–1845), the Cape Town librarian, interviewed Dyer during 1824 and wrote: "Samson Dyer is a most extraordinary man of uncommon industry, honesty and sobriety." The previously unnamed island has since been known as Dyer Island or Dyers Island, and in the 1830s was noted for its sealskins, seal oil, penguin eggs and guano.

Dyer invested his money in the purchase of a number of farms, such as Platterug and Goedvertrouw, where he kept sheep. He was also the owner of land in Hawston and had shares in the farm Zandfontein.
