= City of Cape Town elections =

List of events

The council of the City of Cape Town in the Western Cape, South Africa is elected every five years by a system of mixed-member proportional representation.

Half of the councillors are elected by first-past-the-post voting from individual wards, while the other half are appointed from party lists so that the total number of party representatives is proportional to the number of votes received. By-elections are held to replace the councillors elected by wards if a vacancy occurs.

== Results ==
The following table shows the composition of the council after past elections and floor-crossing periods.

Event	ACDP	ALJ	ANC	COPE	DA	EFF	FF+	ID	NNP	PAC	PA	UDM	Other	Total
2000 election	8	—	77	—	107	—	—	—	—	1	—	3	4	200
2002 floor-crossing	8	—	80	—	71	—	—	—	32	1	—	3	5	200
2004 floor-crossing	6	—	104	—	70	—	—	4	5	1	—	3	7	200
2006 election	7	—	81	—	90	—	1	23	—	1	—	2	5	210
2007 floor-crossing	7	—	81	—	95	—	1	16	—	1	—	1	8	210
2011 election	3	1	73	3	135	—	1	—	—	1	—	1	3	221
2016 election	3	2	57	1	154	7	1	—	—	1	1	1	3	231
2021 election	6	3	43	0	135	10	4	—	—	1	4	1	24	231
2026 election	3	6	33	—	133	9	8	—	—	1	9	3	30	235

== December 2000 election ==
Seats in the city council after the 2000 election. Government: DA (107) Opposition: ANC (77) ACDP (8) Others (8)

The current form of the City of Cape Town was created in 2000 by merging the six transitional municipalities in the Cape Town metropolitan area (Cape Town/Central, South Peninsula, Blaauwberg, Tygerberg, Oostenberg and Helderberg) and the overarching Cape Metropolitan Council. The council of the new municipality consisted of 200 members, 100 elected from wards and the other 100 from party lists. The election was held on 5 December 2000; the Democratic Alliance won a majority of 107 seats.

Party	List			Ward			Total seats
Party	Votes	%	Seats	Votes	%	Seats	Total seats
Democratic Alliance	377,885	53.28	41	372,032	52.61	66	107
African National Congress	272,181	38.38	43	268,124	37.92	34	77
African Christian Democratic Party	25,976	3.66	8	27,972	3.96	0	8
United Democratic Movement	11,231	1.58	3	9,098	1.29	0	3
Africa Muslim Party	8,056	1.14	2	6,484	0.92	0	2
Pan Africanist Congress of Azania	4,529	0.64	1	1,873	0.26	0	1
Moderate Independent Party	2,329	0.33	1	1,528	0.22	0	1
Green Party	1,973	0.28	0	477	0.07	0	0
Inkatha Freedom Party	1,648	0.23	1	2,287	0.32	0	1
Cape People's Congress	1,045	0.15	0	1,071	0.15	0	0
Azanian People's Organisation	1,025	0.14	0	1,120	0.16	0	0
Helderberg Community Civic Organization	869	0.12	0	625	0.09	0	0
Abolition of Income Tax and Usury Party	489	0.07	0				0
Independents				14,401	2.04	0	0
Total	709,236	100.00	100	707,092	100.00	100	200
Valid votes	709,236	98.87		707,092	98.81		
Invalid/blank votes	8,129	1.13		8,497	1.19		
Total votes	717,365	100.00		715,589	100.00		
Registered voters/turnout	1,269,582	56.50		1,269,582	56.36		
Source: Electoral Commission

=== By-elections from December 2000 to October 2002 ===
The following by-elections were held to fill vacant ward seats in the period between the election in December 2000 and the floor crossing period in October 2002.

Date	Ward	Party of the previous councillor	Party of the newly elected councillor
25 April 2001	34	African National Congress	African National Congress
15 August 2001	71	Democratic Alliance	Democratic Alliance
28 August 2002	62	Democratic Alliance	Democratic Alliance

=== October 2002 floor crossing ===
Seats in the city council after the 2002 floor crossing. Government: ANC (80) NNP (32) Opposition: DA (71) ACDP (8) Others (9)

In terms of the Eighth Amendment of the Constitution and the judgment of the Constitutional Court in United Democratic Movement v President of the Republic of South Africa and Others, in the period from 8–22 October 2002 councillors had the opportunity to cross the floor to a different political party without losing their seats.

In the Cape Town city council, the Democratic Alliance (DA) lost 31 councillors to the New National Party (NNP), which had formerly been part of the DA. The DA also lost 3 councillors to the African National Congress (ANC), 1 to the Universal Party and 1 who became an independent. The sole councillor of the Inkatha Freedom Party (IFP) also crossed to the NNP. The ANC and the NNP formed a coalition which held a majority of 112 seats.

Party	Seats before	Net change	Seats after
African National Congress	77	▲3	80
Democratic Alliance	107	▼36	71
New National Party	–	▲32	32
African Christian Democratic Party	8	0	8
United Democratic Movement	3	0	3
Africa Muslim Party	2	0	2
Moderate Independent Party	1	0	1
Pan Africanist Congress of Azania	1	0	1
Independent	–	▲1	1
Universal Party	–	▲1	1
Inkatha Freedom Party	1	▼1	0

=== By-elections from October 2002 to August 2004 ===
The following by-elections were held to fill vacant ward seats in the period between the floor crossing periods in October 2002 and September 2004.

Date	Ward	Party of the previous councillor	Party of the newly elected councillor
7 May 2003	67	Democratic Alliance	Democratic Alliance
11 February 2004	42	African National Congress	African National Congress
23 June 2004	6	Democratic Alliance	Democratic Alliance
23 June 2004	9	Democratic Alliance	Democratic Alliance
23 June 2004	13	Democratic Alliance	Democratic Alliance
23 June 2004	15	Democratic Alliance	African National Congress
23 June 2004	46	Democratic Alliance	Democratic Alliance

=== September 2004 floor crossing ===
Seats in the city council after the 2004 floor crossing. Government: ANC (104) NNP (5) Opposition: DA (70) ACDP (6) Others (15)

Another floor-crossing period occurred on 1–15 September 2004. 23 of the 32 NNP councillors crossed to the ANC, giving the ANC a majority of 104 seats. A further 4 NNP councillors crossed to the ID. 2 councillors of the African Christian Democratic Party (ACDP) crossed to the Federation of Democrats, a new party.

Party	Seats before	Net change	Seats after
African National Congress	81	▲23	104
Democratic Alliance	70	0	70
African Christian Democratic Party	8	▼2	6
New National Party	32	▼27	5
Independent Democrats	–	▲4	4
United Democratic Movement	3	0	3
Africa Muslim Party	2	0	2
Federation of Democrats	–	▲2	2
Independent	1	0	1
Moderate Independent Party	1	0	1
Pan Africanist Congress of Azania	1	0	1
Universal Party	1	0	1

=== By-elections from September 2004 to February 2006 ===
The following by-elections were held to fill vacant ward seats in the period between the floor crossing periods in September 2004 and the election in March 2006.

Date	Ward	Party of the previous councillor	Party of the newly elected councillor
24 November 2004	32	Democratic Alliance	Democratic Alliance
7 September 2005	21	Democratic Alliance	Democratic Alliance
7 September 2005	48	African National Congress	African National Congress

== March 2006 election ==
Seats in the city council after the 2006 election. Government: DA (90) ACDP (7) Others (8) Opposition: ANC (81) ID (23) PAC (1)

At the election of 1 March 2006, the city council was expanded to 210 members with the addition of 5 new wards and 5 new PR list councillors. No party obtained a majority, with the Democratic Alliance (DA) winning 90 seats, the African National Congress (ANC) 81, and the new Independent Democrats (ID) 23.

After much negotiation, a seven-party governing coalition was formed, consisting of the DA, the African Christian Democratic Party (ACDP), the Africa Muslim Party (AMP), the United Democratic Movement (UDM), the Freedom Front Plus (VF+), the United Independent Front (UIF), and the Universal Party (UP). The coalition held 105 seats, exactly half of the council, compared to the 104 seats held by the ANC and ID together. The single councillor from the Pan Africanist Congress abstained from the election of the mayor.

Party	List			Ward			Total seats
Party	Votes	%	Seats	Votes	%	Seats	Total seats
Democratic Alliance	306,246	42.26	29	303,299	41.45	61	90
African Christian Democratic Party	22,757	3.14	7	24,145	3.30	0	7
Africa Muslim Party	9,749	1.35	3	9,567	1.31	0	3
United Democratic Movement	6,869	0.95	2	5,081	0.69	0	2
Freedom Front Plus	3,549	0.49	1	3,621	0.49	0	1
United Independent Front	1,916	0.26	1	1,556	0.21	0	1
Universal Party	1,009	0.14	1	1,337	0.18	0	1
Seven-party coalition total	352,095	48.58	44	348,606	47.65	61	105
African National Congress	280,232	38.67	40	271,873	37.16	41	81
Independent Democrats	79,839	11.02	20	76,711	10.48	3	23
Pan Africanist Congress of Azania	4,722	0.65	1	2,386	0.33	0	1
Inkatha Freedom Party	981	0.14	0	1,254	0.17	0	0
Federation of Democrats	946	0.13	0	1,190	0.16	0	0
Pro Ratepayers Party	942	0.13	0	977	0.13	0	0
Moderate Independent Party	715	0.10	0	934	0.13	0	0
Progressive Independent Movement	710	0.10	0				0
Pension Poverty Relief and Unemployment Front	683	0.09	0	573	0.08	0	0
Azanian People's Organisation	642	0.09	0	280	0.04	0	0
Peace and Justice Congress	626	0.09	0	734	0.10	0	0
Alliance of Free Democrats	541	0.07	0	61	0.01	0	0
First Community Party	414	0.06	0	199	0.03	0	0
Abolition of Income Tax and Usury Party	328	0.05	0	432	0.06	0	0
Workers International Vanguard League	297	0.04	0				0
United Party				1,276	0.17	0	0
Independents				24,151	3.30	0	0
Total	724,713	100.00	105	731,637	100.00	105	210
Valid votes	724,713	97.88		731,637	98.77		
Invalid/blank votes	15,664	2.12		9,102	1.23		
Total votes	740,377	100.00		740,739	100.00		
Registered voters/turnout	1,486,781	49.80		1,486,781	49.82		
Source: Electoral Commission

=== By-elections from March 2006 to August 2007 ===
The following by-elections were held to fill vacant ward seats in the period between the election in March 2006 and the floor crossing period in September 2007.

Date	Ward	Party of the previous councillor	Party of the newly elected councillor
7 June 2006	82	Independent Democrats	Democratic Alliance (Note: The former councillor was re-elected to the ward on behalf of a different party.)
7 February 2007	74	Democratic Alliance	Democratic Alliance

=== September 2007 floor crossing ===
Seats in the city council after the 2007 floor crossing. Government: DA (95) ID (16) ACDP (7) Others (3) Opposition: ANC (81) Others (8)

The final floor-crossing period occurred on 1–15 September 2007; floor-crossing was subsequently abolished in 2008 by the Fifteenth Amendment of the Constitution. In the Cape Town city council, the ID lost three councillors to the new National People's Party (NPP), two to the DA and one to the new Social Democratic Party. The UDM and the UIF each lost one councillor to the DA, and the AMP lost one councillor to the NPP. Control of the council was not affected because the ID had joined the governing coalition earlier in the year.

Party	Seats before	Net change	Seats after
Democratic Alliance	91	▲4	95
African National Congress	81	0	81
Independent Democrats	22	▼6	16
African Christian Democratic Party	7	0	7
National People's Party	–	▲4	4
Africa Muslim Party	3	▼1	2
United Democratic Movement	2	▼1	1
Freedom Front Plus	1	0	1
Pan Africanist Congress of Azania	1	0	1
Universal Party	1	0	1
Social Democratic Party	–	▲1	1
United Independent Front	1	▼1	0

=== By-elections from September 2007 to May 2011 ===
The following by-elections were held to fill vacant ward seats in the period between the floor crossing period in September 2007 and the election in May 2011.

Date	Ward	Party of the previous councillor	Party of the newly elected councillor
19 March 2008	15	Democratic Alliance	Independent Democrats
16 July 2008	103	Democratic Alliance	Democratic Alliance
10 December 2008 (Note: The ANC could not stand candidates in this by-election due to a failure to submit paperwork on time.)	33	African National Congress	Congress of the People (Note: The former councillor was re-elected to the ward nominally as an independent, but in fact on behalf of COPE, which was not yet a registered party. See http://www.politicsweb.co.za/documents/full-western-cape-byelection-results.)
10 December 2008	34	African National Congress	Congress of the People
10 December 2008	35	African National Congress	Congress of the People
10 December 2008	45	African National Congress	Democratic Alliance
10 December 2008	52	African National Congress	Congress of the People
10 December 2008	75	African National Congress	Democratic Alliance
10 December 2008	87	African National Congress	Congress of the People
10 December 2008	88	African National Congress	Congress of the People
25 March 2009	2	Democratic Alliance	Democratic Alliance
25 March 2009	79	Independent Democrats	Democratic Alliance
6 May 2009	71	Democratic Alliance	Democratic Alliance
24 June 2009	9	Democratic Alliance	Democratic Alliance
24 June 2009	14	Democratic Alliance	Democratic Alliance
24 June 2009	70	Democratic Alliance	Democratic Alliance
24 June 2009	73	Democratic Alliance	Democratic Alliance
18 November 2009	32	African National Congress	Democratic Alliance
26 May 2010	44	African National Congress	Democratic Alliance
21 July 2010	34	Congress of the People	African National Congress
21 July 2010	35	Congress of the People	African National Congress
21 July 2010	98	African National Congress	African National Congress
21 July 2010	99	African National Congress	Democratic Alliance
25 August 2010	49	Democratic Alliance	Democratic Alliance
8 December 2010	19	Democratic Alliance	Democratic Alliance
8 December 2010	104	African National Congress	African National Congress

== May 2011 election ==
Seats in the city council after the 2011 election. Government: DA (135) Opposition: ANC (73) Others (13)

At the election of 18 May 2011, the council was expanded to 221 members with the addition of 6 new wards and 5 new PR list seats. The Democratic Alliance won a majority of 135 seats.

Party	List			Ward			Total seats
Party	Votes	%	Seats	Votes	%	Seats	Total seats
Democratic Alliance	682,929	61.15	57	675,020	60.69	78	135
African National Congress	370,420	33.17	40	360,827	32.44	33	73
Congress of the People	12,596	1.13	3	12,059	1.08	0	3
African Christian Democratic Party	11,873	1.06	3	15,227	1.37	0	3
National Party	6,038	0.54	1	5,718	0.51	0	1
United Democratic Movement	4,290	0.38	1	4,402	0.40	0	1
Al Jama-ah	3,928	0.35	1	4,310	0.39	0	1
Africa Muslim Party	3,157	0.28	1	4,430	0.40	0	1
Cape Muslim Congress	2,740	0.25	1	3,658	0.33	0	1
Pan Africanist Congress of Azania	1,993	0.18	1	2,606	0.23	0	1
Freedom Front Plus	1,864	0.17	1	2,121	0.19	0	1
Democrats for Change	1,637	0.15	0	942	0.08	0	0
African People's Convention	1,513	0.14	0	787	0.07	0	0
Cape Party	1,471	0.13	0	1,561	0.14	0	0
Community Coalition	1,271	0.11	0	1,715	0.15	0	0
National Independent Civic Organisation	1,048	0.09	0	1,844	0.17	0	0
Inkatha Freedom Party	1,031	0.09	0	1,888	0.17	0	0
United Christian Democratic Party	845	0.08	0	22	0.00	0	0
National Freedom Party	765	0.07	0	694	0.06	0	0
South African Progressive Civic Organisation	724	0.06	0	825	0.07	0	0
National People's Party	707	0.06	0	1,221	0.11	0	0
Universal Party	650	0.06	0	1,078	0.10	0	0
National Alliance for Democracy	629	0.06	0	1,008	0.09	0	0
Western Cape Community	574	0.05	0	291	0.03	0	0
United Independent Front	436	0.04	0	417	0.04	0	0
Azanian People's Organisation	405	0.04	0	322	0.03	0	0
African Bond of Unity	275	0.02	0	232	0.02	0	0
Pan Africanist Movement	265	0.02	0	132	0.01	0	0
Social Democratic Party	167	0.01	0	93	0.01	0	0
United Civics of South Africa	166	0.01	0	423	0.04	0	0
Abolition of Income Tax and Usury Party	165	0.01	0	230	0.02	0	0
Independent Civic Organisation	151	0.01	0				0
United Majority Front	124	0.01	0	301	0.03	0	0
Independents				5,893	0.53	0	0
Total	1,116,847	100.00	110	1,112,297	100.00	111	221
Valid votes	1,116,847	99.20		1,112,297	98.98		
Invalid/blank votes	8,998	0.80		11,518	1.02		
Total votes	1,125,845	100.00		1,123,815	100.00		
Registered voters/turnout	1,745,853	64.49		1,745,853	64.37		
Source: Electoral Commission

=== 2011 mayoral election ===
Candidate	Party	Votes	%
Patricia de Lille	Democratic Alliance	137	64.62
Tony Ehrenreich	African National Congress	75	35.38
Total		212	100.00
Valid votes		212	97.70
Invalid/blank votes		5	2.30
Total votes		217	100.00

=== By-elections from May 2011 to August 2016 ===
The following by-elections were held to fill vacant ward seats in the period between the elections in May 2011 and August 2016.

Date	Ward	Party of the previous councillor	Party of the newly elected councillor
7 December 2011	71	Democratic Alliance	Democratic Alliance
18 January 2012	68	Democratic Alliance	Democratic Alliance
25 April 2012	45	Democratic Alliance	Democratic Alliance
19 September 2012	88	African National Congress	Democratic Alliance
30 January 2013	22	Democratic Alliance	Democratic Alliance
22 May 2013	105	Democratic Alliance	Democratic Alliance
19 February 2014	35	African National Congress	African National Congress
19 February 2014	43	Democratic Alliance	Democratic Alliance
28 May 2014	25	Democratic Alliance	Democratic Alliance
13 August 2014	5	Democratic Alliance	Democratic Alliance
13 August 2014	54	Democratic Alliance	Democratic Alliance
13 August 2014	56	Democratic Alliance	Democratic Alliance
5 November 2014	23	Democratic Alliance	Democratic Alliance
1 April 2015	72	Democratic Alliance	Democratic Alliance
9 December 2015	101	African National Congress	African National Congress

== August 2016 election ==
Seats in the city council after the 2016 election. Government: DA (154) Opposition: ANC (57) EFF (7) Others (13)

At the election of 3 August 2016, the council was expanded to 231 members with the addition of 5 new wards and 5 new PR list seats. The Democratic Alliance won a majority of 154 seats.

Party	List			Ward			Total seats
Party	Votes	%	Seats	Votes	%	Seats	Total seats
Democratic Alliance	832,624	66.75	73	831,890	66.46	81	154
African National Congress	305,902	24.52	22	302,965	24.20	35	57
Economic Freedom Fighters	38,871	3.12	7	40,243	3.22	0	7
African Christian Democratic Party	14,104	1.13	3	16,181	1.29	0	3
African Independent Congress	9,515	0.76	1	5,228	0.42	0	1
Al Jama-ah	6,892	0.55	2	9,506	0.76	0	2
Freedom Front Plus	4,919	0.39	1	5,365	0.43	0	1
United Democratic Movement	4,139	0.33	1	2,441	0.20	0	1
Democratic Independent Party	3,472	0.28	1	4,049	0.32	0	1
Cape Muslim Congress	3,386	0.27	1	3,073	0.25	0	1
Congress of the People	3,015	0.24	1	3,175	0.25	0	1
Pan Africanist Congress of Azania	2,938	0.24	1	3,381	0.27	0	1
National Party	2,296	0.18	0	1,988	0.16	0	0
Patriotic Alliance	2,016	0.16	1	2,943	0.24	0	1
Cape Party	1,760	0.14	0	1,608	0.13	0	0
Africa Muslim Party	1,571	0.13	0	1,692	0.14	0	0
Christian Democratic Party	1,097	0.09	0	318	0.03	0	0
Local People's Party	1,056	0.08	0	1,654	0.13	0	0
African People's Convention	906	0.07	0	749	0.06	0	0
Al Shura Party	685	0.05	0	1,085	0.09	0	0
Independent Civic Organisation	673	0.05	0	799	0.06	0	0
Nationalist Coloured Party	622	0.05	0	794	0.06	0	0
Khoisan Kingdom And All People	527	0.04	0	243	0.02	0	0
Ubuntu Party	490	0.04	0	196	0.02	0	0
National People's Party	449	0.04	0	812	0.06	0	0
Khoisan Revolution	444	0.04	0	218	0.02	0	0
South Africa People's Party	443	0.04	0	451	0.04	0	0
Coloured Voice	442	0.04	0	420	0.03	0	0
The Greens	433	0.03	0	45	0.00	0	0
Inkatha Freedom Party	378	0.03	0	56	0.00	0	0
South African Progressive Civic Organisation	357	0.03	0	346	0.03	0	0
Sizwe Ummah Nation	283	0.02	0	276	0.02	0	0
People's Democratic Movement	236	0.02	0	203	0.02	0	0
South African People for Equality	171	0.01	0	145	0.01	0	0
Independent Sport Party	122	0.01	0	39	0.00	0	0
Patriotic Association	111	0.01	0	19	0.00	0	0
Independents				7,077	0.57	0	0
Total	1,247,345	100.00	115	1,251,673	100.00	116	231
Valid votes	1,247,345	98.58		1,251,673	98.83		
Invalid/blank votes	17,954	1.42		14,777	1.17		
Total votes	1,265,299	100.00		1,266,450	100.00		
Registered voters/turnout	1,977,690	63.98		1,977,690	64.04		
Source: Electoral Commission

=== 2016 mayoral election ===
Candidate	Party	Votes	%
Patricia de Lille	Democratic Alliance	160	74.07
Xolani Sotashe	African National Congress	56	25.93
Total		216	100.00

=== By-elections from August 2016 to November 2021 ===
The following by-elections were held to fill vacant ward seats in the period between the elections in August 2016 and November 2021.

Date	Ward	Party of the previous councillor	Party of the newly elected councillor
9 November 2016	108	African National Congress	African National Congress
2 August 2017	4	Democratic Alliance	Democratic Alliance
20 September 2017	37	African National Congress	African National Congress
15 November 2017	93	African National Congress	African National Congress
29 November 2017	102	Democratic Alliance	Democratic Alliance
16 January 2019	31	Democratic Alliance	Democratic Alliance
16 January 2019	101	African National Congress	African National Congress
13 February 2019	54	Democratic Alliance	Democratic Alliance
19 June 2019	21	Democratic Alliance	Democratic Alliance
21 August 2019	95	African National Congress	African National Congress
13 November 2019	19	Democratic Alliance	Democratic Alliance
13 November 2019	82	Democratic Alliance	Democratic Alliance
11 November 2020 (Note: By-election was delayed due to the COVID-19 pandemic.)	14	Democratic Alliance	Democratic Alliance
11 November 2020	51	African National Congress	African National Congress
11 November 2020	88	African National Congress	African National Congress
9 December 2020	115	Democratic Alliance	Democratic Alliance
21 April 2021	20	Democratic Alliance	Democratic Alliance

=== November 2018 mayoral election ===
On 31 October 2018, incumbent Mayor Patricia de Lille resigned. An election was held on 6 November 2018 to determine her successor. It was subsequently won by former Mayor, Dan Plato. The candidates nominated were:

- Dan Plato (Democratic Alliance), former Provincial Minister of Community Safety (2011 - 2018); former Member of the Western Cape Provincial Parliament (2011 - 2018); former Mayor of Cape Town (2009 - 2011)
- Xolani Sotashe (African National Congress), incumbent Leader of the African National Congress in the Cape Town City Council; Mayoral candidate in 2016; Member of the Cape Town City Council (2000 - present)
- Grant Haskin (African Christian Democratic Party), incumbent Leader of the African Christian Democratic Caucus (2016–present); former Deputy Mayor of Cape Town (2007 - 2009); former Member of the Western Cape Provincial Parliament

The results were as follows.

Candidate	Party	Votes	%
Dan Plato	Democratic Alliance	146	72.28
Xolani Sotashe	African National Congress	53	26.24
Grant Haskin	African Christian Democratic Party	3	1.49
Total		202	100.00
Valid votes		202	97.12
Invalid/blank votes		6	2.88
Total votes		208	100.00

== November 2021 election ==
Results of the election by ward and proportional representation seats

Seats in the city council after the 2021 election. Government: DA (135) Opposition: ANC (43) EFF (10) Good (9) Others (34)

The Democratic Alliance won a reduced majority of 136 seats. This was later reduced to 135 seats when after a 7-month legal battle and a recount it was announced on May 26 that the Democratic Alliance had been misallocated a seat that should have been awarded to Cape Independence Party, giving the Cape Independence Party a second seat.

Party	Ward			List			Total seats
Party	Votes	%	Seats	Votes	%	Seats	Total seats
Democratic Alliance	525,515	57.78	83	536,571	58.74	52	135
African National Congress	167,907	18.46	33	170,911	18.71	10	43
Economic Freedom Fighters	37,255	4.10	0	37,913	4.15	10	10
Good	35,846	3.94	0	33,656	3.68	9	9
Cape Coloured Congress	25,257	2.78	0	25,854	2.83	7	7
African Christian Democratic Party	21,791	2.40	0	20,886	2.29	6	6
Freedom Front Plus	14,825	1.63	0	14,025	1.54	4	4
Patriotic Alliance	13,967	1.54	0	13,102	1.43	4	4
Al Jama-ah	11,964	1.32	0	10,830	1.19	3	3
Africa Restoration Alliance	7,365	0.81	0	5,856	0.64	2	2
Cape Independence Party	5,876	0.65	0	5,697	0.62	2	2
United Independent Movement	5,250	0.58	0	5,116	0.56	1	1
Independent candidates	9,910	1.09	0				0
Cape Muslim Congress	3,239	0.36	0	3,355	0.37	1	1
United Democratic Movement	2,477	0.27	0	3,105	0.34	1	1
African Independent Congress	2,861	0.31	0	2,596	0.28	1	1
Pan Africanist Congress of Azania	1,821	0.20	0	2,729	0.30	1	1
Democratic Independent Party	1,910	0.21	0	1,653	0.18	1	1
African Transformation Movement	871	0.10	0	1,811	0.20	0	0
Credible Alternative 1st Movement	1,172	0.13	0	1,265	0.14	0	0
Democratic People's Alternative	1,334	0.15	0	732	0.08	0	0
National Freedom Party	1,038	0.11	0	978	0.11	0	0
One Movement for Cape Town	810	0.09	0	1,186	0.13	0	0
The Organic Humanity Movement	982	0.11	0	946	0.10	0	0
Congress of the People	682	0.07	0	1,224	0.13	0	0
African People's Convention	925	0.10	0	558	0.06	0	0
Dagga Party	401	0.04	0	828	0.09	0	0
The Greens	531	0.06	0	674	0.07	0	0
United South Africa	581	0.06	0	557	0.06	0	0
Democratic People's Movement	567	0.06	0	566	0.06	0	0
Spectrum National Party	610	0.07	0	466	0.05	0	0
Sizwe Ummah Nation	607	0.07	0	452	0.05	0	0
African Islamic Movement	445	0.05	0	592	0.06	0	0
Democratic Labour Party	218	0.02	0	809	0.09	0	0
Independent Civic Organisation of South Africa	442	0.05	0	533	0.06	0	0
African Progressive Movement	117	0.01	0	791	0.09	0	0
Inkatha Freedom Party	95	0.01	0	802	0.09	0	0
United Progressive Party South Africa	277	0.03	0	554	0.06	0	0
God Save Africa	89	0.01	0	689	0.08	0	0
Land Party	302	0.03	0	384	0.04	0	0
Our Nation	291	0.03	0	299	0.03	0	0
Economic Emancipation Forum	307	0.03	0	204	0.02	0	0
African Freedom Revolution	253	0.03	0	241	0.03	0	0
Black First Land First	189	0.02	0	244	0.03	0	0
People's Democratic Movement	20	0.00	0	303	0.03	0	0
Abantu Batho Congress	134	0.01	0	173	0.02	0	0
Compatriots of South Africa	77	0.01	0	177	0.02	0	0
Independent South African National Civic Organisation	17	0.00	0	184	0.02	0	0
International Party	3	0.00	0	158	0.02	0	0
Eastern Cape Movement	32	0.00	0	98	0.01	0	0
Free Democrats				111	0.01	0	0
Democratic Equality Empowerment Party	32	0.00	0				0
Christians of South Africa	12	0.00	0				0
Khoi-San Kingdom of RSA	10	0.00	0				0
Total	909,509	100.00	116	913,444	100.00	115	231
Valid votes	909,509	98.86		913,444	98.85		
Invalid/blank votes	10,485	1.14		10,665	1.15		
Total votes	919,994	100.00		924,109	100.00		
Registered voters/turnout	1,973,708	46.61		1,973,708	46.82		
Source: Electoral Commission

=== 2021 mayoral election ===
Candidate	Party	Votes	%
Geordin Hill-Lewis	Democratic Alliance	141	74.60
Noluthando Makasi	African National Congress	46	24.34
Jack Miller	Cape Independence Party	2	1.06
Total		189	100.00
Valid votes		189	84.38
Invalid/blank votes		35	15.62
Total votes		224	100.00

=== By-elections from November 2021 ===
The following by-elections were held to fill vacant ward seats in the period since the election in November 2021.

Date	Ward	Party of the previous councillor	Party of the newly elected councillor
13 Oct 2022	5	Democratic Alliance	Democratic Alliance
23 Nov 2022	38	African National Congress	African National Congress
8 Feb 2023	56	Democratic Alliance	Patriotic Alliance
28 Jun 2023	107	Democratic Alliance	Democratic Alliance
19 Jun 2024	64	Democratic Alliance	Democratic Alliance
19 Jun 2024	105	Democratic Alliance	Democratic Alliance
19 Jun 2024	113	Democratic Alliance	Democratic Alliance
28 Aug 2024	58	Democratic Alliance	Democratic Alliance
23 Oct 2024	8	Democratic Alliance	Democratic Alliance
20 Nov 2024	30	Democratic Alliance	Democratic Alliance
25 Mar 2026	104	African National Congress	African National Congress

In ward 56, the DA councillor resigned in November 2022. The DA failed to nominate a candidate in time for the February by-election, which was contested by parties including Good, Al Jama-ah, Economic Freedom Fighters, and the Patriotic Alliance (PA). The PA won the ward with 41% of the vote.

== November 2026 election ==
The following table shows the result of the 2026 election.

Party	Ward			List			Total seats
Party	Votes	%	Seats	Votes	%	Seats	Total seats
Democratic Alliance	649,759	56.18	86	655,059	56.66	47	133
African National Congress	160,050	13.84	32	162,612	14.07	1	33
Patriotic Alliance	45,965	3.97	0	41,138	3.56	9	9
Economic Freedom Fighters	42,743	3.70	0	43,429	3.76	9	9
Freedom Front Plus	39,140	3.38	0	39,927	3.45	8	8
ActionSA	29,685	2.57	0	33,811	2.92	7	7
Al Jama-ah	27,905	2.41	0	27,043	2.34	6	6
Good	26,168	2.26	0	26,790	2.32	6	6
National Coloured Congress	25,132	2.17	0	26,529	2.29	5	5
United Democratic Movement	13,377	1.16	0	14,495	1.25	3	3
African Christian Democratic Party	14,020	1.21	0	13,386	1.16	3	3
South African Communist Party	11,975	1.04	0	9,011	0.78	2	2
African Transformation Movement	9,327	0.81	0	10,713	0.93	2	2
uMkhonto weSizwe Party	6,812	0.59	0	6,513	0.56	1	1
Africa Restoration Alliance	6,556	0.57	0	5,614	0.49	1	1
Cape Muslim Congress	6,075	0.53	0	4,692	0.41	1	1
Build One South Africa	4,430	0.38	0	4,087	0.35	1	1
Pan Africanist Congress of Azania	3,546	0.31	0	3,517	0.30	1	1
People's Movement for Change	3,572	0.31	0	3,207	0.28	1	1
Independent candidates	5,884	0.51	0				0
African Independent Congress	2,893	0.25	0	2,070	0.18	1	1
Cape Independence Party	2,521	0.22	0	2,042	0.18	1	1
Hopeful Leaders Democrats	1,586	0.14	0	2,226	0.19	1	1
One Love Alliance	1,928	0.17	0	1,636	0.14	0	0
Afrika Mayibuye Movement	1,961	0.17	0	1,551	0.13	0	0
Alliance of Citizens for Change	1,317	0.11	0	1,087	0.09	0	0
Congress of the People	965	0.08	0	1,349	0.12	0	0
Home of Independence	1,063	0.09	0	1,105	0.10	0	0
Democratic People's Alternative	978	0.08	0	946	0.08	0	0
African Alliance Congress	783	0.07	0	1,027	0.09	0	0
Organic Humanity Movement	1,077	0.09	0	686	0.06	0	0
Inkatha Freedom Party	857	0.07	0	730	0.06	0	0
United Democratic Front Party	543	0.05	0	1,040	0.09	0	0
Sizwe Ummah Nation	871	0.08	0	557	0.05	0	0
Truth and Solidarity Movement	726	0.06	0	523	0.05	0	0
United Independent Movement	442	0.04	0	647	0.06	0	0
United South Africa	468	0.04	0	505	0.04	0	0
Labour Party	538	0.05	0	314	0.03	0	0
African Movement Congress	20	0.00	0	746	0.06	0	0
Azania Peaceful Revolution	431	0.04	0	316	0.03	0	0
Khoi Aboriginal Party	338	0.03	0	394	0.03	0	0
Land Party	201	0.02	0	300	0.03	0	0
Service Delivery Party	312	0.03	0	185	0.02	0	0
Minority Front	312	0.03	0	146	0.01	0	0
Christ Kingdom Party	17	0.00	0	430	0.04	0	0
Spectrum National Party	297	0.03	0	108	0.01	0	0
SAKK Military Veterans Party	222	0.02	0	178	0.02	0	0
Economic Liberators Forum South Africa	183	0.02	0	212	0.02	0	0
All African Allied Congress	23	0.00	0	305	0.03	0	0
National Freedom Party	31	0.00	0	279	0.02	0	0
Ekhethu Peoples Party	197	0.02	0	108	0.01	0	0
All Natives of South Africa	164	0.01	0	132	0.01	0	0
Operation Dudula	26	0.00	0	236	0.02	0	0
Aboriginal Gorilla Fighters	70	0.01	0	172	0.01	0	0
Free Democrats				169	0.01	0	0
Avright Political Movement	19	0.00	0	84	0.01	0	0
Democratic Labour Party	2	0.00	0				0
Total	1,156,503	100.00	118	1,156,114	100.00	117	235
Valid votes	1,156,503	98.80		1,156,114	98.74		
Invalid/blank votes	14,037	1.20		14,746	1.26		
Total votes	1,170,540	100.00		1,170,860	100.00		
Registered voters/turnout	2,158,976	54.22		2,158,976	54.23		
