= 2018 Cape Town mayoral election =

Held at Cape Town City Council on 6 November 2018

- 6 November 2018
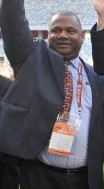
Nominee	Dan Plato	Xolani Sotashe	Grant Haskin
Party	DA	ANC	ACDP
Electoral vote	146	53	3
Percentage	72.3%	26.2%	1.5%
Mayor before election
Ian Neilson (Acting)
DA
Elected mayor
Dan Plato
DA

An indirect mayoral election was held at a special sitting of the Cape Town City Council on 6 November 2018 to determine the successor of former mayor Patricia de Lille after she resigned on 31 October. Former mayor and Provincial Minister of Community Safety, Dan Plato, of the Democratic Alliance won the election as the party holds a two-thirds majority in the city council.

== Democratic Alliance selection ==
=== Nominated ===
- Dan Plato, Provincial Minister of Community Safety; Member of the Western Cape Provincial Parliament; former mayor of Cape Town

=== Declared ===
- Ian Neilson, Deputy Mayor of Cape Town
- Brett Herron, Mayoral Committee Member for Urban Housing and Transport
- Heinrich Cyril Volmink, Member of the Gauteng Provincial Legislature; former Member of the National Assembly
- Grant Twigg, Democratic Alliance Metro Chairperson
- Anda Ntsodo, East Area-based Oversight Member
- Sharna Fernandez, Speaker of the Western Cape Provincial Parliament
- Nomafrench Mbombo, Provincial Minister of Health; Member of the Western Cape Provincial Parliament; former Provincial Minister of Cultural Affairs and Sports

=== Declined ===
- Bonginkosi Madikizela, Provincial Minister of Human Settlements; former Provincial Minister of Housing; Member of the Western Cape Provincial Parliament (ran for the party's nomination for premier; lost)
- Helen Zille, Premier of the Western Cape; former Leader of the Democratic Alliance; former mayor of Cape Town

== African National Congress selection ==
=== Nominated ===
Xolani Sotashe, Leader of the African National Congress in the Cape Town City Council; Mayoral candidate in 2016; Member of the Cape Town City Council

== African Christian Democratic Party selection ==
=== Nominated ===
Grant Haskin, Leader of the African Christian Democratic Caucus; former Deputy Mayor of Cape Town; former Member of the Western Cape Provincial Parliament

== Results ==
Candidate	Party	Votes	%
Dan Plato	Democratic Alliance	146	72.28
Xolani Sotashe	African National Congress	53	26.24
Grant Haskin	African Christian Democratic Party	3	1.49
Total		202	100.00
Valid votes		202	97.12
Invalid/blank votes		6	2.88
Total votes		208	100.00
