= Xolani Sotashe =

Leader of the Opposition in the Cape Town City Council
- In office 11 August 2016 – 13 July 2022
- Preceded by: Tony Ehrenreich
- Succeeded by: Banele Majingo

Member of the Cape Town City Council
- Incumbent
- Assumed office 7 December 2000
- Constituency: Proportional representation Ward 86

Personal details
- Born: 1971 or 1972 (age 53–54); Cape Town, Western Cape, South Africa
- Political party: African National Congress
- Spouse: Bongeka Sotashe
- Education: Boland College; Helderberg College; University of Cape Town

Xolani Ronald Sotashe is a South African politician who is the former Leader of the Opposition in the Cape Town City Council, former Leader of the African National Congress in the Cape Town City Council, Chairperson of the African National Congress Dullah Omar regional branch, current Member of the Cape Town City Council and the Chairperson of Subcouncil 9. He previously served as Chief Whip of the African National Congress in the Cape Town City Council and Chairperson of Subcouncil 24. He was the African National Congress mayoral candidate in 2016 and 2018, losing to Patricia de Lille and Dan Plato respectively.

== Early life and career ==
Born in Cape Town, Sotashe is one of seven children. His mother is from Mfuleni, a township outside Kuils River. At an early age, Sotashe and his family moved to the Transkei, where he completed his primary and secondary education. He served on the student representative council of Ndema Senior Secondary School.

He later moved back to Cape Town and studied at Boland College and Helderberg College. He did courses at the University of Cape Town through the Development Action Group. Sotashe worked for Agfa Photo Fast. While working there, he developed a passion for photojournalism.

== Political career ==
Sotashe was always involved in regional politics. While working at Agfa Photo Fast, Sotashe became involved in party politics. He was particularly active in the former South East ANC region of Cape Town. The region included areas such as the Strand, Somerset West and Khayelitsha. He was a member of the ANC Youth League in Lwandle, near Strand. The region later merged with other regions to create the present Dullah Omar region, which represents the entire Cape Town metropolitan area. He later became chairperson of the region and currently still holds the position.

In 2000, Sotashe was elected councillor to the newly-created City of Cape Town Municipality. In his early years as councillor, he served as a ward councillor for ward 86, an area that included the township of Nomzamo in Strand. He now serves as a proportional representation councillor. He has served on many portfolio committees. After the 2011 municipal elections, he was appointed Chief Whip of the African National Congress caucus in the council and also Chairperson of the Subcouncil 24. He served in both positions until 2016.

In June 2016, the African National Congress selected Sotashe to be the party's Cape Town mayoral candidate. He replaced Tony Ehrenreich who was the party's previous mayoral candidate in 2011.

In August 2016, he subsequently lost to incumbent Mayor, Patricia de Lille, by a wide margin as the African National Congress's support in the city decreased. He was then appointed Chairperson of Subcouncil 9.

In November 2018, Sotashe was the ANC's candidate for the post of Mayor of Cape Town after Patricia de Lille resigned. He was challenged for the position by Dan Plato and Grant Haskin. He lost to Plato, receiving 53 votes compared to Plato's 146 votes. His other challenger, Haskin, received only 3 votes.

In July 2022, Banele Majingo replaced Sotashe as the leader of the ANC caucus in council.
