= Dan Plato =

Former mayor of Cape Town (born 1960)

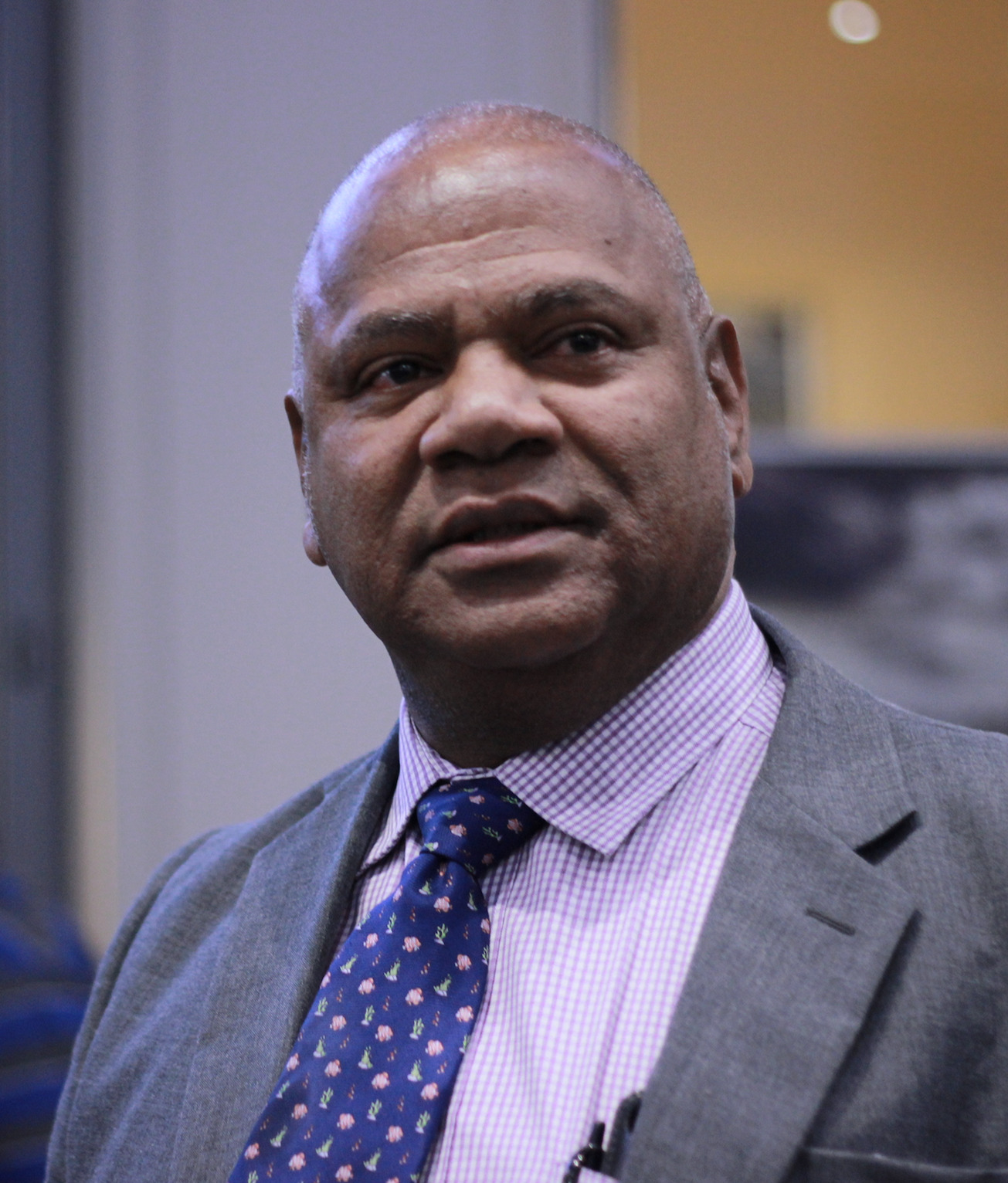
- Plato in 2019

Mayor of Cape Town
- In office 6 November 2018 – 31 October 2021
- Deputy: Ian Neilson
- Preceded by: Ian Neilson (acting); Patricia De Lille
- Succeeded by: Geordin Hill-Lewis
- In office 12 May 2009 – 1 June 2011
- Deputy: Grant Haskin; Ian Neilson
- Preceded by: Grant Haskin (acting); Helen Zille
- Succeeded by: Patricia de Lille

Western Cape Provincial Minister of Community Safety
- In office 1 June 2011 – 31 October 2018
- Premier: Helen Zille
- Preceded by: Albert Fritz
- Succeeded by: Alan Winde

Member of the Western Cape Provincial Parliament
- In office 18 January 2022 – 13 February 2024
- Preceded by: Bonginkosi Madikizela
- In office 1 June 2011 – 31 October 2018
- Constituency: City of Cape Town

Personal details
- Born: Daniel Plato; 5 October 1960 (age 66) Cape Town, South Africa
- Party: People's Movement for Change (2024–present)
- Other political affiliations: Democratic Alliance (2002–2024); National Party (1990–1997); New National Party (1998–2002)
- Occupation: Politician

Daniel Plato (born 5 October 1960), known as Dan Plato, is a South African politician and a former Member of the Western Cape Provincial Parliament. He served from June 2011 until October 2018 and again from January 2022 until February 2024. He is the former mayor of Cape Town, a position he held for two nonconsecutive terms from May 2009 until June 2011 and again from November 2018 until October 2021. From June 2011 to October 2018, he was the Western Cape Provincial Minister of Community Safety.

Born in Cape Town, Plato was involved in political activities during his high school career. He was a community organiser and played a crucial role in mobilising residents against the Apartheid government. He was elected as a ward councillor in 1996. Plato was elected Mayor of Cape Town in May 2009, succeeding Helen Zille, who was elected Premier of the Western Cape.

In 2011, the Democratic Alliance nominated Patricia de Lille as the party's Cape Town mayoral candidate for the 2011 local government elections. Plato left office on 1 June 2011 and subsequently took office as a Member of the Western Cape Provincial Parliament and took up the position of Provincial Minister of Community Safety, succeeding Albert Fritz.

In August 2018, he declared his candidacy to succeed De Lille as Mayor of Cape Town. The Democratic Alliance named him as the party's preferred candidate in September 2018. Plato resigned as both Provincial Minister of Community Safety and Member of the Western Cape Provincial Parliament in late-October 2018. He was sworn in as a councillor on 1 November 2018 and was elected Mayor on 6 November. In August 2021, the DA nominated party spokesperson on finance and Member of Parliament, Geordin Hill-Lewis, as their mayoral candidate for the City of Cape Town for the municipal elections on 1 November 2021. The DA retained their majority on the Cape Town city council. In December 2021, the DA announced that Plato would be returning to the Provincial Parliament in early 2022. He was sworn in as an MPP on 18 January 2022. He resigned from the DA and joined Marius Fransman's People's Movement for Change in February 2024.

== Early life and political activities ==
=== Activities before the Cape Town City Council ===
Plato has been involved in political activities since high school, particularly in Cape Town's northern suburbs. He was a community organiser and played a significant role in rallying people against the apartheid regime. The Emergency Services Unit of the former Bellville Municipality (Tygerberg Administration) employed him in the 1980s. Plato became a member of the National Party in 1990. He later became the Cape Town Chairperson of the South African National Tuberculosis Association during the mid-1990s.

=== Cape Town City Councillor ===
In 1996, Plato was elected as a Cape Metro councillor for the Belhar, Uitsig and Ravensmead region. He became a member of the council executive the following year. He served two terms as Chairperson of the City of Cape Town's Economic Development, Tourism and Property Management Portfolio Committee.

He managed the Housing portfolio in the Mayoral Committee from 2006 to 2009. During the same period, he was Deputy Chairperson of both the DA Metro Region and the DA Caucus in the City of Cape Town. He had also served as acting mayor at various intervals. Shortly before being elected mayor in May 2009, Plato had taken over as the Mayoral Committee Member responsible for Service Delivery and Economic Development.

=== Other activities ===
In addition to his political activities, he has served on the boards of multiple organisations, including the Cape Film Commission, Cape Tourism, the University of the Western Cape and the Business Opportunities Network. He had also been a member of several community-based trusts. Plato was previously co-owner of National Pride Holdings Pty (Ltd).

== Political career ==
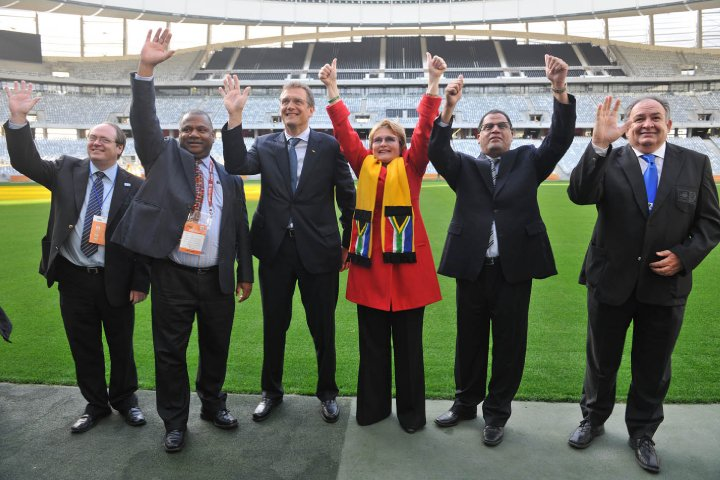
Plato at the handover of the Cape Town Stadium.

=== Mayor of Cape Town (2009–2011) ===
On 30 April 2009, Helen Zille resigned as Mayor of Cape Town. Plato declared his candidacy for the post and was ultimately selected as the party's preferred candidate.

Plato was elected Mayor of Cape Town on 12 May 2009. He won with 119 votes to the ANC candidate Belinda Landingwe's 69 votes, while six councillors abstained from the vote.

During his tenure as mayor, controversial open-air toilets were built in the Makhaza region of Khayelitsha. The Democratic Alliance defended its decision to build the toilets. The Western Cape High Court later ruled against it. Cape Town was one of host cities of the 2010 FIFA World Cup. He banned the old South African flag from being present at soccer matches at the Cape Town Stadium after he described the flag as being detrimental to the country's image.

The Department of Co-operative Governance and Traditional Affairs rated Cape Town as the best-managed city in South Africa, while the Auditor-General awarded the city with a rating for good governance and accountability. Plato introduced many job creation projects and made reducing unemployment one of the focus points of his mayoral agenda.

In 2010, Plato announced his candidacy for the post of Provincial Leader of the Democratic Alliance. He lost to incumbent Theuns Botha. He received 123 votes compared to Botha's 543 and Lennit Max's 317.

In 2011, Plato declared his intention to seek a full term as Mayor of Cape Town ahead of the 2011 municipal elections. His challengers for the post were Mayoral Committee Member for Social Development, Grant Pascoe, Mayoral Committee Member for Housing, Shehaam Sims, and Leader of the Independent Democrats, Patricia de Lille. De Lille defeated Plato in an internal party election. Plato left office on 1 June 2011.

=== Provincial Minister for Community Safety (2011–2018) ===
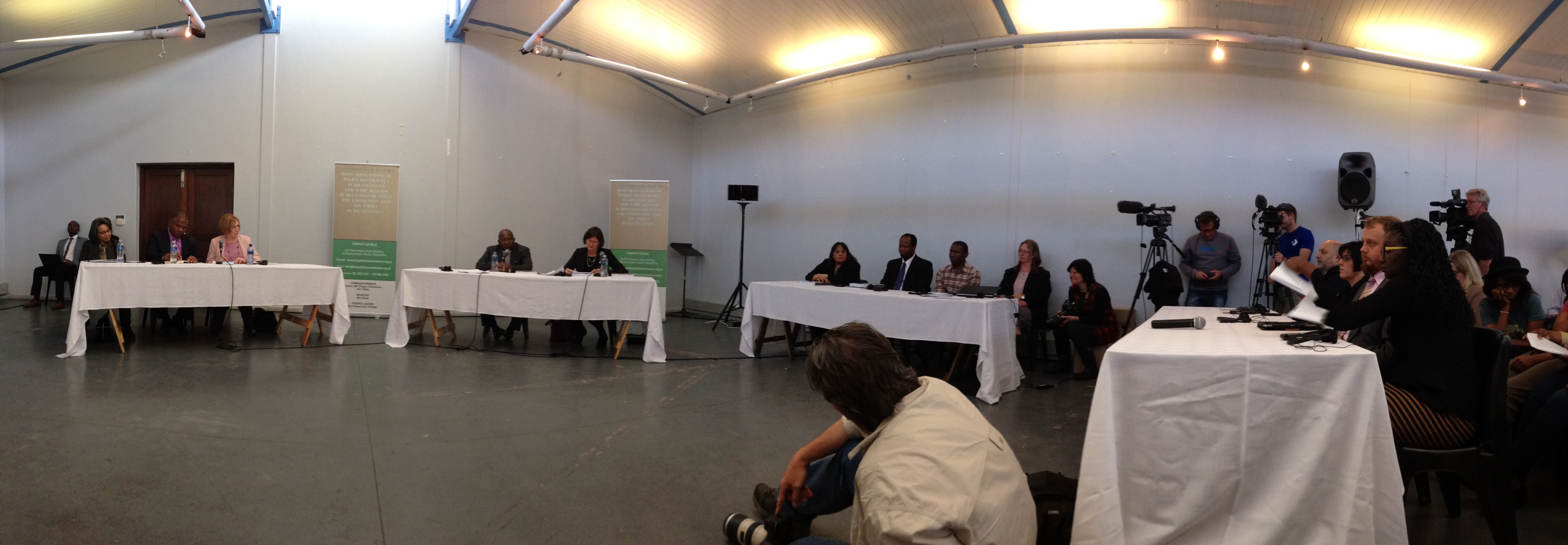
Judge O'Regan and Adv. Pikoli (centre table) with Dan Plato and Helen Zille (left table) at the Khayelitsha Commission handover ceremony.

Western Cape Premier Zille reshuffled her Provincial Cabinet on 30 May 2011 and appointed Plato to the post of Provincial Minister for Community Safety, succeeding Albert Fritz. She said in a statement: "I am confident he will make a major contribution, not only to the community safety portfolio but to the provincial cabinet as a whole." He took office on 1 June, hours after he left office as mayor. In October 2018, Zille announced that the Provincial Minister of Economic Opportunities, Alan Winde, would succeed Plato. Plato effectively resigned from the provincial government on 31 October 2018 and Winde took office the next day.

=== Second term as mayor (2018–2021) ===
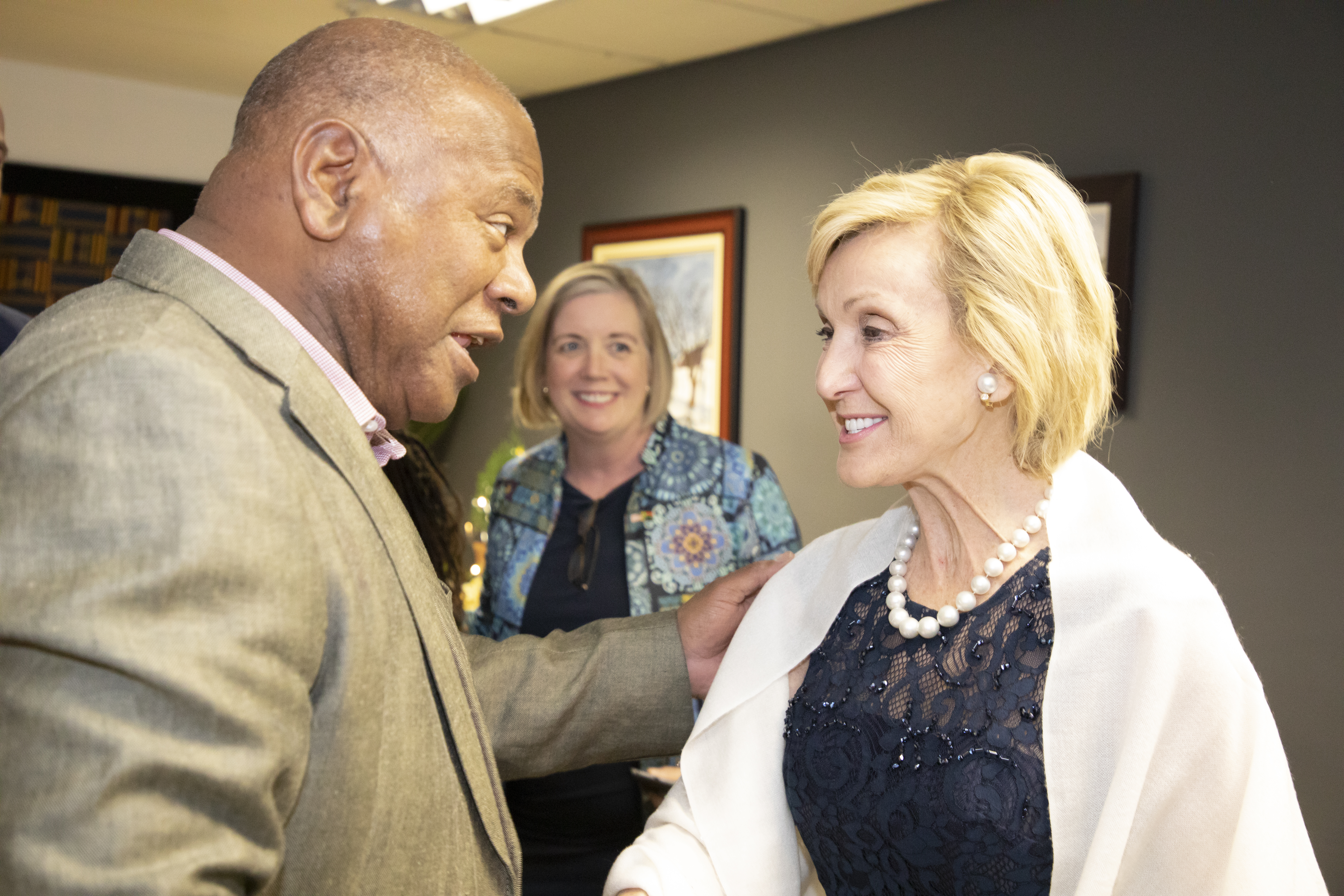
Plato with the United States Ambassador to South Africa Lana Marks.

In August 2018, Plato declared his candidacy to replace De Lille as Mayor of Cape Town after she had announced her intention to resign on 31 October 2018. On 18 September 2018, the Democratic Alliance announced that Plato would succeed De Lille. Plato defeated many prominent candidates for the nomination, including the Speaker of the Western Cape Provincial Parliament, Sharna Fernandez, and the Deputy Mayor of Cape Town, Ian Neilson.

On 1 November 2018, Plato was sworn in as a councillor. The day before the ceremony, Patricia de Lille formally resigned as Mayor of Cape Town. A former acquaintance of Patricia de Lille, Brett Herron, resigned as a councillor after the ceremony along with many other councillors, in protest against the removal of De Lille and the mayoralty of Plato. Plato was elected Mayor of Cape Town on 6 November 2018 during a special council sitting. He received 146 out of 202 valid votes. His main challengers were Xolani Sotashe of the African National Congress and Grant Haskin of the African Christian Democratic Party. Sotashe received 53 votes while Haskin got 3 votes. Six ballots were spoilt.

On 1 August 2020, Plato declared that he was a candidate for regional chairperson of the Democratic Alliance. He was elected at the party's regional conference in October 2020, defeating incumbent Grant Twigg.

In April 2021, Plato applied to be the DA's mayoral candidate for the City of Cape Town for the 2021 local government elections. He was up against the DA's Shadow Minister of Finance in the National Assembly Geordin Hill-Lewis and the DA provincial leader Bonginkosi Madikizela. Madikizela later withdrew and resigned from all active party roles following a qualifications scandal. In August 2021, DA leader announced Hill-Lewis as the party's mayoral candidate. Plato was reported to be upset with the party's decision and mulled resigning from politics, though he pledged to support Hill-Lewis's campaign. Plato delivered his last speech to the Cape Town City Council as Executive Mayor on 29 September 2021 and received a standing ovation. The DA retained their majority on the city council in the local election.

=== Return to the Provincial Parliament ===
Following Geordin Hill-Lewis's election as Mayor of Cape Town on 17 November 2021, Plato served as an ordinary councillor. In December 2021, the DA announced that Plato would be taking up Bonginkosi Madikizela's seat in the Provincial Parliament. On 18 January 2022, he was sworn in as a DA Member of the Provincial Parliament by Speaker Masizole Mnqasela. Despite speculation that Plato was headed back to the Provincial Cabinet, Plato served as an ordinary member. Premier Alan Winde's spokesperson Cayla Murray dismissed speculation in a short statement. On returning to the Provincial Parliament, Plato said that he was "glad to be back home" and that he has "no regrets" about leaving the City of Cape Town.

=== People's Movement for Change ===
In February 2024, Plato resigned from the DA, and announced that he was joining the People's Movement for Change. DA provincial leader Tertuis Simmers thanked him for his service.
