= Cape Town City Council =

Administrative body of the City of Cape Town metro

Type
- Type: Unicameral municipal legislature of the City of Cape Town

History
- Founded: 2000; 26 years ago
- Preceded by: Cape Metropolitan Council and six metropolitan local councils

Leadership
- Speaker: Felicity Purchase, Democratic Alliance since 18 November 2021
- Executive Mayor: Geordin Hill-Lewis, Democratic Alliance since 18 November 2021
- Executive Deputy Mayor: Eddie Andrews, Democratic Alliance since 18 November 2021
- Chief Whip: Desiree Visagie, Democratic Alliance

Structure
- Seats: 235
- Political groups: Government (133): DA (133); Opposition (102): ANC (33); EFF (9); PA (9); VF+ (8); ActionSA (7); Al Jama-ah (6); Good (6); Others (24)
- Length of term: 5 years
- Authority: Constitution of South Africa; Local Government: Municipal Structures Act, 1998
- Ward councilors: 118
- Proportional representation councilors: 117

Elections
- Voting system: Mixed-member proportional representation
- First general election: 5 December 2000; 25 years ago
- Last general election: 4 November 2026; 17 days ago

Meeting place
- Council Chamber, Civic Centre, 12 Hertzog Boulevard, CBD, Cape Town, South Africa

Website
- capetown.gov.za

Rules
- Council Rules of Order

The Cape Town City Council, officially the Municipal Council of the City of Cape Town, is the administrative body of the City of Cape Town metropolitan municipality.

As of 2026, the council consists of 235 seats, and is led by a Speaker and an Executive Mayor. The council is currently majority-led by the Democratic Alliance, which holds 133 seats.

== Jurisdiction ==
The Cape Town City Council governs the metropolitan area of the City of Cape Town, a Category A metropolitan municipality in the Western Cape province of South Africa. It is one of eight metropolitan municipalities in the country, and the only one in the Western Cape. The municipality covers approximately 2,446 km², extending from Atlantis in the north to Cape Point in the south, and Gordon's Bay in the southeast. Its jurisdiction also includes Robben Island.

The municipality borders the West Coast District Municipality to the north, the Cape Winelands District Municipality to the east, and the Overberg District Municipality to the southeast. As a metropolitan municipality, it exercises municipal authority directly throughout its jurisdiction, without an intermediate district municipality. Its administrative seat is the city of Cape Town, with the council headquartered at the Cape Town Civic Centre on Hertzog Boulevard, in Cape Town CBD.

== Roles ==
The Cape Town City Council is the highest decision-making body of the City of Cape Town, exercising both legislative and executive authority over municipal affairs. Its responsibilities include adopting municipal bylaws, approving budgets and service tariffs, determining municipal policies, and overseeing the administration of the city. The council delegates certain executive and administrative functions to its officeholders, committees, and municipal officials.

The council's principal roles include:

- Executive mayor: The political head of the municipality, responsible for providing executive leadership, directing municipal policy, overseeing service delivery, and exercising powers delegated by the council. The mayor appoints members of the mayoral committee (Mayco) and oversees the implementation of the city's strategic objectives.
- Executive deputy mayor: Assists the executive mayor and exercises the mayor's powers and performs their duties in the mayor's absence, subject to the applicable legislation and delegated authority.
- Speaker: Presides over council meetings, maintains order during proceedings, enforces the council's rules, and oversees compliance with the councilors' code of conduct. The speaker is also responsible for ensuring effective legislative oversight, the functioning of council committees, and public participation processes.
- Chief whip: Coordinates relations between political party whips, assists the speaker in maintaining order during council proceedings, and facilitates the representation of political parties on council committees.
- Mayoral committee members: Appointed by the executive mayor from among the councilors, they assist in exercising executive responsibilities and overseeing designated municipal portfolios, such as finance, transport, housing, and public safety. They are referred to as Members of the Mayoral Committee (MMCs).
- Ward councilors: Represent the interests of residents within their respective electoral wards, raise community concerns, facilitate public participation, and monitor local service delivery. Proportional representation councilors represent their political parties while sharing the broader responsibilities of council membership.

The council also appoints the city manager, the municipality's most senior administrative official. Unlike the elected political officeholders, the city manager is responsible for leading the municipal administration, implementing council decisions, ensuring compliance with applicable legislation, and overseeing municipal departments through the executive management team.

=== Elections ===
As is the case in all South African metropolitan municipalities, council members are elected through a system of mixed-member proportional representation. The City of Cape Town is divided into 118 electoral districts, known as wards, each of which elects one ward councilor through first-past-the-post voting. The remaining 117 councilors are elected from party lists, with these seats allocated to ensure that the overall composition of the 235-member council is broadly proportional to the votes received by each political party.

Each registered voter receives two ballots: one to elect a ward councilor and another to vote for a political party. Ward candidates may represent political parties or stand as independents, while proportional representation seats are reserved for candidates nominated on political party lists. The allocation of proportional representation seats takes account of the ward election results to achieve an overall proportional outcome.

Councilors serve five-year terms, with local government elections ordinarily held every five years across South Africa. Under Section 159 of the Constitution of South Africa, an election must be held within 90 days of the expiration or dissolution of a municipal council. The outgoing council remains competent to function until the newly elected council has been declared elected.

=== Appointments ===
Following each municipal election, the newly elected Cape Town City Council convenes its inaugural meeting within 14 days of the declaration of election results. At this meeting, councilors elect a speaker from among their members, with the election presided over by the municipal manager. The speaker subsequently presides over council meetings and oversees compliance with council procedures and the Council Rules of Order.

The council also elects the executive mayor, executive deputy mayor, and chief whip from among its councilors. Elections for these positions are governed by Schedule 3 of the Local Government: Municipal Structures Act, 1998. Candidates must be formally nominated by two councilors and accept their nominations in writing. Where only one candidate is nominated, that candidate is declared elected without a contested vote. The chief whip is elected under the supervision of the speaker.

Once elected, the executive mayor appoints the members of the mayoral committee (Mayco) from among the councilors. The committee assists the mayor in exercising executive authority and overseeing municipal departments. Unlike the mayor, deputy mayor, speaker, and chief whip, mayoral committee members are appointed by the executive mayor rather than being elected by the full council.

The council is additionally responsible for appointing the city manager, the municipality's most senior administrative official, in accordance with the Local Government: Municipal Systems Act, 2000. Unlike political officeholders, the city manager is appointed through a professional recruitment process and must meet prescribed qualifications and competency requirements.

== Committees ==
The Cape Town City Council operates a system of committees responsible for overseeing municipal functions, reviewing policies, examining expenditure, and facilitating public participation. Committees are established primarily under sections 79 and 80 of the Local Government: Municipal Structures Act, 1998. Section 79 committees are appointed by the council to exercise oversight and perform delegated functions, while section 80 committees assist the executive mayor in carrying out executive responsibilities.

The council has a total of 13 section 79 portfolio committees that oversee municipal policies, budgets, service delivery, and administration within their respective areas of responsibility. Each portfolio committee is led by a Member of the Mayoral Committee (MMC). The committees cover:

- Community services and health
- Corporate services
- Economic growth
- Energy
- Finance
- Future planning and resilience
- Human settlements
- Innovation and ease of doing business
- Safety and security
- Spatial planning and environment
- Urban mobility (transit)
- Urban waste management, and
- Water and sanitation

The committees review matters within their portfolios and make recommendations to the council.

Other committees include the Municipal Public Accounts Committee (MPAC), which exercises oversight over municipal expenditure and financial accountability, and the Rules and Ethics Committee, which deals with council procedures and ethical matters. The Audit and Performance Audit Committee provides independent oversight and advice concerning financial reporting, internal controls, risk management, and organizational performance.

The municipality also operates 20 geographically defined subcouncils, which address local service delivery, planning matters, community concerns, and ward-level expenditure. These are supported by ward committees, chaired by the respective ward councilors, which provide a link between residents and the council. Ward committees may have up to ten community representatives, and meet at least once every two months.

== Budget ==
The Cape Town City Council is responsible for approving the City of Cape Town's annual municipal budget, including operating and capital expenditure, municipal rates, and service tariffs. Under the Local Government: Municipal Finance Management Act, 2003, the council must approve the budget before the beginning of the municipal financial year on 1 July. The budget is prepared within a three-year Medium-Term Revenue and Expenditure Framework (MTREF).

On 29 June 2026, the council approved the municipality's original R87.71 billion budget for the 2026/27 financial year, comprising R74.62 billion in operating expenditure and R13.09 billion in capital expenditure. Operating expenditure covers municipal services, personnel costs, repairs, and maintenance, while capital expenditure primarily funds infrastructure development and upgrades, including those for roads, public transit, electricity, water, and housing.

The 2026/27 budget included a planned investment of approximately R40 billion in basic infrastructure over three years.

=== Audits ===
The City of Cape Town has maintained a longstanding record of unqualified financial audits from the Auditor-General of South Africa, receiving 20 consecutive unqualified audit opinions between the 2005/06 and 2024/25 financial years. An unqualified audit opinion indicates that the municipality's financial statements fairly present its financial position in all material respects.

The municipality received three consecutive clean audits from 2021/22 to 2023/24, becoming the only metropolitan municipality in South Africa to achieve a clean audit for 2023/24. Unlike an ordinary unqualified audit, a clean audit also requires the absence of material findings concerning performance reporting and compliance with legislation.

== Composition ==
As of the 2026 South African municipal elections, the composition of the council is as follows:

Party	Ward seats	PR seats	Total seats	Status
Democratic Alliance	86	47	133	In majority government
African National Congress	32	1	33	In opposition
Patriotic Alliance	0	9	9	In opposition
Economic Freedom Fighters	0	9	9	In opposition
Freedom Front Plus	0	8	8	In opposition
ActionSA	0	7	7	In opposition
Al Jama-ah	0	6	6	In opposition
GOOD	0	6	6	In opposition
Others	0	24	24	In opposition
Total	118	117	235	

== See also ==
- City of Cape Town
- Cape Town
- Metropolitan municipality (South Africa)
- City of Cape Town elections
