= National Party South Africa =

National Party South Africa could refer to:

- National Party (South Africa) (1914-1997)
- National Party South Africa (2008) (2008-2019)
