= Andrew Arnolds =

South African politician

Councillor Andrew Arnolds

Permanent delegate to the National Council of Provinces from the Western Cape
- In office 23 May 2019 – 7 March 2023

Personal details
- Born: Andrew Arnolds
- Party: Economic Freedom Fighters
- Other political affiliations: Agang South Africa; African Christian Democratic Party
- Profession: Politician

Andrew Arnolds is a South African politician of the Economic Freedom Fighters who represented the Western Cape in the National Council of Provinces from 2019 until 2023.

== Political career ==
Arnolds was a member of the African Christian Democratic Party and served as the Deputy Mayor of Cape Town between 2006 and 2007. He resigned from the ACDP in 2009.

Arnolds joined Agang South Africa prior to the 2014 general election. He was on the party's list for the Western Cape Provincial Parliament. The party won no representation in the provincial parliament. He then joined the Economic Freedom Fighters and returned to the Cape Town city council as one of the first EFF municipal councillors following the August 2016 municipal elections. Arnolds served as the EFF's provincial secretary.

== Parliamentary career ==
After the general election on 8 May 2019, Arnolds was elected to the National Council of Provinces. He took office as an MP on 23 May 2019.

He resigned from the NCOP on 7 March 2023.

=== Committee assignments ===
On 24 June 2019, he was named to two committees. They are:

- Select Committee on Land Reform, Environment, Mineral Resources and Energy
- Select Committee on Public Enterprises and Communication

== Post-parliamentary career ==
In February 2025, Arnolds was sworn in as an EFF councillor in the City of Cape Town.
