= Tony Ehrenreich =

South African trade unionist

Councillor Tony Ehrenreich
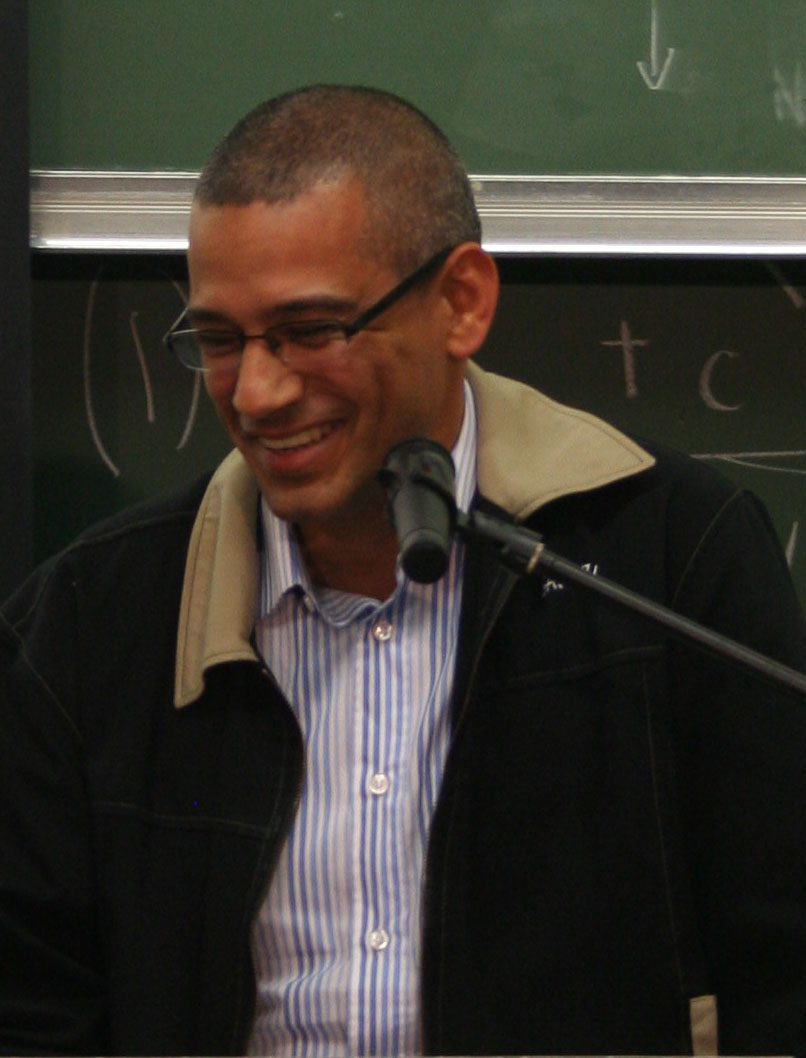

National Deputy General-Secretary COSATU
- In office 1999–2011

Provincial Secretary COSATU
- Incumbent
- Assumed office 1996

Leader of the Opposition in the Cape Town City Council
- Incumbent
- Assumed office 2011

Personal details
- Born: Anthony John Ehrenreich; 15 September 1961 (age 65) Parow, Cape Town, South Africa
- Party: ANC
- Education: University of Cape Town
- Profession: Trade union leader, Mechanic, politician
- Website: www.tonyehrenreich.co.za

Tony Ehrenreich is a South African trade-unionist and regional secretary of the Western Cape region of COSATU.

== Political career ==
Ehrenreich joined COSATU in 1989, raising to become its National Deputy General-Secretary from 1999 to 2001. He represented COSATU at the World Trade Organization in Doha, International Confederation of Labour Trade Committee in Geneva; Organization of African Trade Union Unity in Ghana, and Unions Bi-lateral with French Trade Unions in Paris.

Ehrenreich was nominated by COSATU as the 2011 mayoral candidate for the African National Congress (ANC) in the City of Cape Town in the 2011 municipal elections. Ehrenreich lost to the Democratic Alliance mayoral candidate, Patricia De Lille. He is now the leader of the opposition in the Cape Town City Council where he is a member of Economic, Environmental and Spatial Planning Portfolio committee.

Ehrenriech is a supporter of mixed-income housing and believes that the primary responsibility of government is to prioritise the needs of the poor first. He donates most of his income to charitable causes through an independent board of trustees.

== Controversial statements ==
=== White civil servants ===
In April 2014 the Anton Alberts of the Freedom Front Plus referred to Ehrenreich as a "racist clown" for a statement Ehrenreich made that if the COSATU-aligned ANC were to gain power in the Western Cape more than half of the white senior civil servants in the provincial government to be sacked to make way for civil servants of other ethnic groups based on the ANC's affirmative action policies.

=== South African Jewish Board of Deputies and Israel ===
During the height of the violence in the Israeli-Palestinian Gaza crisis of 2014, Ehrenreich was accused by South African Jewish Board of Deputies chairperson Mary Kluk of inflaming tensions in South Africa when he issued a Cosatu press release informing the South African Jewish Board of Deputies that it had until 7 August to stop advancing a "Zionist agenda" in South Africa. Ehrenreich warned that should they fail to do so Cosatu would boycott and call strikes at all of their member – and supporting companies and organisations.

Some time later, just before the lapse of the second 72-hour ceasefire between Hamas and Israel on 13 August 2014, Tony Ehrenreich stated on his Facebook page that "The time has come to say very clearly that if a woman or child is killed in Gaza, then the Jewish board of deputies, who are complicit, will feel the wrath of the People of SA with the age old biblical teaching of an eye for an eye. The time has come for the conflict to be waged everywhere the Zionist supporters fund and condone the war killing machine of Israel [sic]." In response, the Jewish Board of Deputies released a statement indicating they will be initiating civil and criminal charges against Ehrenreich for "hate speech and incitement to violence".

Doron Isaacs of Equal Education and Zackie Achmat of the Treatment Action Campaign, both outspoken critics of Israeli actions in Gaza, criticized Ehrenreich's call of an 'eye for an eye'. Isaacs stated that it was "idiotic and against the traditions of Cosatu" whilst Achmat wrote in a Twitter post that it was "[u]nlawful, wrong & harms #Palestine'."

=== Tweets ===
Ehrenreich has been criticised by Business Day columnist Gareth Van Onselen for his combative and insulting Twitter messages targeting the Democratic Alliance's leader Helen Zille and mayor of Cape Town Patricia de Lille. His comments have been described by Van Onselen as "deep and hostile myopia" that is counter productive to increasing the appeal of the ANC amongst voters in the Western Cape.
