= Democratic Independent Party (South Africa) =

Political party in South Africa

- Leader: Anwar Adams
- Founder: Anwar Adams
- Founded: 2016
- Slogan: Divine Intervention for divine inspiration by dedicated individuals
- Cape Town City Council: 1 / 231

Website
- diparty.org.za

The Democratic Independent Party is a minor South African political party. It formed in 2016 by Anwar Adams, shortly before the 2016 South African municipal elections, winning one seat in the City of Cape Town. Adams was previously a Pan Africanist Congress of Azania councillor.

The party contested the 2021 South African municipal elections, focusing on homelessness and housing. Besides Cape Town, it also contested the Cederberg Local Municipality, with former Democratic Alliance councillor and speaker Banjamin Zass as mayoral candidate.

After a reduction in support in 2021, Adams demanded a rerun of the elections, claiming that it was rigged.

== Election results ==
=== Municipal elections ===
City of Cape Town, 3 August 2016
Votes				Seats		
Ward	List	Total	%	Ward	List	Total
4,049	3,472	7,521	0.3	0	1	1
