= Cape Muslim Congress =

Political party in South Africa

- Leader: Yagyah Adams
- Founder: Yagyah Adams
- Founded: 2010
- Ideology: Minority politics
- Slogan: Serving the communities of the Cape
- Cape Town City Council: 1 / 231

Website
- www.capemuslimcongress.co.za

The Cape Muslim Congress is a South African Muslim political party active in Cape Town and led by founder Yagyah Adams. It won a single seat in the City of Cape Town in 2011, and again in 2016, taken up by Adams.

The party favours the reinstatement of the death penalty, and supports castration for violent offenders.

== Election results ==
=== Municipal elections ===
City of Cape Town local election, 18 May 2011
Votes				Seats		
Ward	List	Total	%	Ward	List	Total
3,658	2,740	6,398	0.3	0	1	1

City of Cape Town local election, 3 August 2016
Votes				Seats		
Ward	List	Total	%	Ward	List	Total
3,073	3,386	6,459	0.3	0	1	1
