= Bonginkosi Madikizela =

South African politician (born 1975)

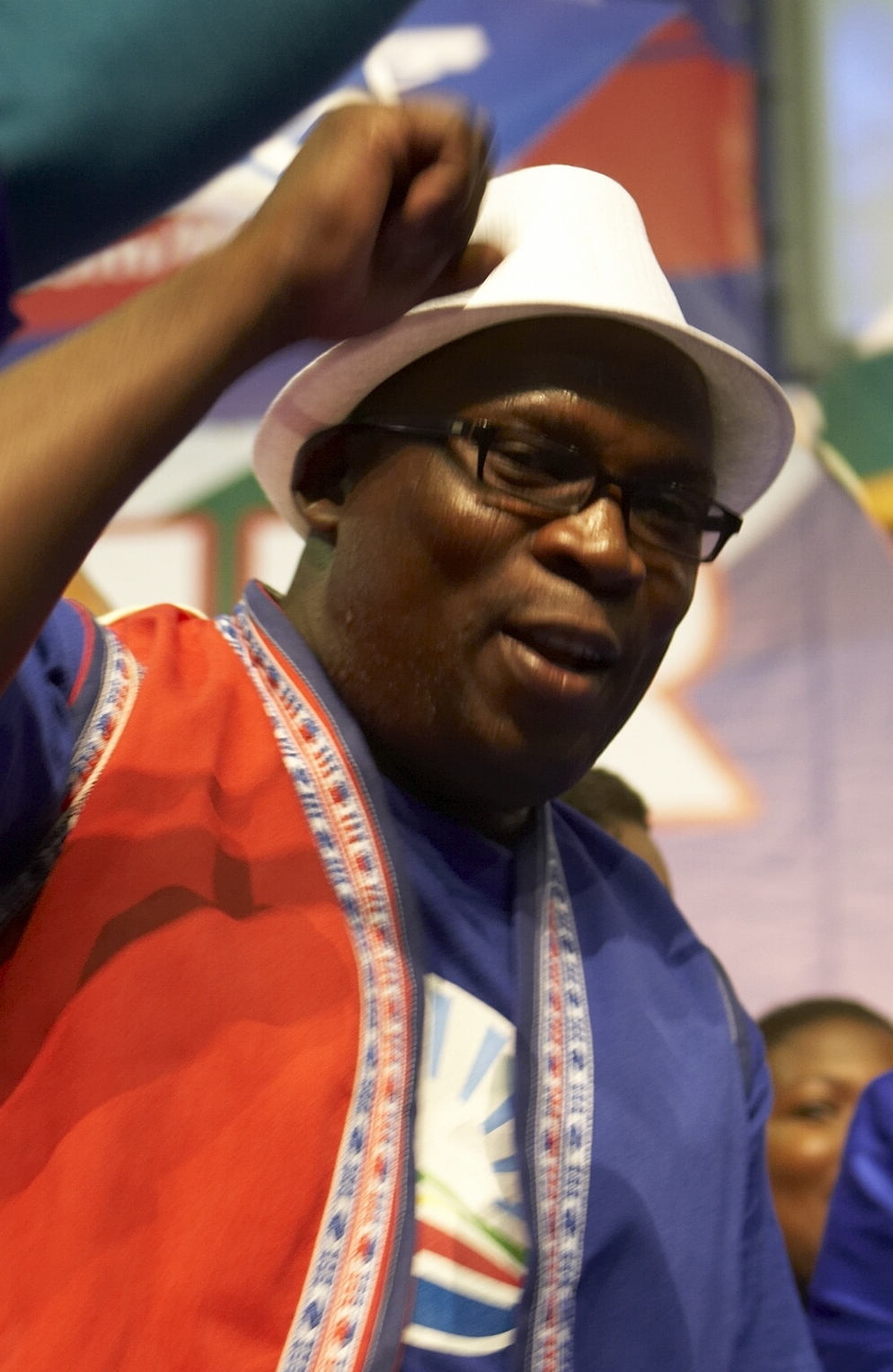

Member of the National Assembly of South Africa
- Incumbent
- Assumed office 25 June 2024

Leader of the Democratic Alliance in Western Cape
- In office 7 October 2017 – 28 April 2021; On leave: 15 April 2021 – 28 April 2021; Interim: 1 February 2017 - 7 October 2017
- Deputy: Albert Fritz
- Preceded by: Patricia de Lille
- Succeeded by: Albert Fritz (interim)

Western Cape Provincial Minister of Transport and Public Works
- In office 23 May 2019 – 28 April 2021; Suspended: 15–28 April 2021
- Premier: Alan Winde
- Preceded by: Donald Grant
- Succeeded by: Tertuis Simmers (acting); Daylin Mitchell

Western Cape Provincial Minister of Human Settlements
- In office 26 May 2014 – 22 May 2019
- Premier: Helen Zille
- Preceded by: Position established
- Succeeded by: Tertuis Simmers

Western Cape Provincial Minister of Housing
- In office 7 May 2009 – 26 May 2014
- Premier: Helen Zille
- Preceded by: Whitey Jacobs
- Succeeded by: Position reconfigured

Deputy Leader of the Democratic Alliance in the Western Cape
- In office 18 April 2015 – 7 October 2017
- Leader: Patricia de Lille
- Preceded by: Theuns Botha
- Succeeded by: Albert Fritz

Member of the Western Cape Provincial Parliament
- In office 6 May 2009 – 28 April 2021

Personal details
- Born: 15 March 1975 (age 51)
- Party: Democratic Alliance
- Other political affiliations: United Democratic Movement; African National Congress
- Relations: Winnie Madikizela-Mandela (aunt)
- Profession: Politician

Bonginkosi Success Madikizela (born 15 March 1975) is a South African politician.

Born in Port Shepstone, in the province of Natal, Madikizela soon moved to Khayelitsha and became politically active in the area. He was a member of the African National Congress (ANC) and United Democratic Movement (UDM), prior to joining the Democratic Alliance (DA) in 2008. He was elected as a DA Member of the Western Cape Provincial Parliament in 2009. Premier Helen Zille appointed him as the Provincial Minister for Housing.

In 2014, he was named Provincial Minister of Human Settlements. A year later, in 2015, Madikizela unseated party stalwart Theuns Botha as deputy provincial leader of the DA. DA Provincial leader Patricia de Lille resigned in February 2017 and left Madikizela in charge as acting provincial leader. He won a full term in October 2017. In 2019, Madikizela became the Provincial Minister of Transport and Public Works. After a qualifications scandal, he resigned as Provincial Leader of the DA on 28 April 2021, six months after his re-election in November 2020. He also resigned from the provincial cabinet and the provincial parliament, but will remain a DA member. He said that he was not pressured to resign as DA provincial leader.

He has been a member of the National Assembly of South Africa since 2024.

== Early life and education ==
Madikizela was born in Port Shepstone, Natal on 15 March 1975. His aunt was prominent anti-apartheid activist Winnie Madikizela Mandela. His brother was murdered in 1990 and he then moved to Chatsworth, living in Welbedacht. Madikizela and a community leader formed the Welbedacht Development Forum to assist the poor residents of the community. In 1991, he dropped out of Asoka Secondary School and worked at a shoe factory shop in Croftdene. In 1998, Madikizela moved to Cape Town to live with his brother. His brother helped him enrol at a computer school and Madikizela soon started studying human resource management at the University of South Africa (UNISA). Madikizela worked as a car guard at a theme park. He soon moved back to Chatsworth and completed a course in computer training. He also became a member of the Chatsworth Child Welfare organisation. Madikizela moved back to Cape Town in 2002 and became active in politics.

== Political career ==
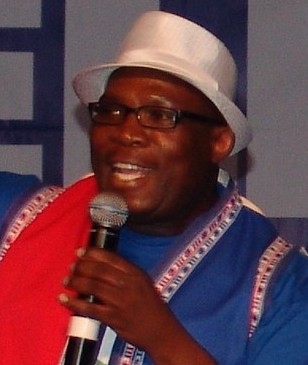
Madikizela speaking at a DA rally prior to the 2011 municipal elections

=== Early career ===
Madikizela had previously been an active member of the ANC. He became prominent in 2005, when he led a group of disaffected ANC members in the Makhaza area of Khayelitsha who had been supportive of former Western Cape Premier and ANC Provincial Chairperson Ebrahim Rasool in his leadership battle with Mcebisi Skwatsha.

After Skwatsha won the leadership election, Madikizela and some of Rasool's supporters in Khayelitsha claimed that they were being marginalised, and later excluded as possible ANC candidates for the local government elections in 2006. In early 2006, Madikizela along with several other ANC members, including some party councillors, were expelled from the party after it became known of their intention to contest the local government elections as independent candidates.

Although he was not elected as a councillor, Madikizela remained politically active, joining the United Democratic Movement (UDM) in 2007. He was appointed the party's Cape Town Metro Regional Secretary until a party investigation found that he had secretly convinced party members to join the Democratic Alliance.

He was subsequently hired as a communication officer at the City of Cape Town, and later a spokesperson in the office of former Mayor of Cape Town, Helen Zille.

=== Joining the DA and Western Cape Provincial Government ===
He officially became a member of DA in October 2008. His aunt, Winnie Madikizela-Mandela, sent two messengers to him "to try and talk some sense" into him. They said that Madikizela-Mandela had said that what he was doing to the ANC was "very embarrassing". Following the April 2009 general election, newly elected premier Helen Zille appointed him to the post of Provincial Minister of Housing.

During his tenure as Provincial Minister of Housing, Madikizela had been embroiled in a number of controversies surrounding housing developments in Mandela Park, Khayelitsha. He had been accused by the Mandela Park Backyarders as well as journalists of breaking a promise of giving residents of the community houses in new Mandela Park developments. The controversy resulted in large demonstrations and blockades against construction in the community. The community of Mandela Park had also accused the MEC of refusing to meet with them. In September 2010, the ANC called for his resignation after his answer to a parliamentary question from the ANC's Pierre Uys over the provision of housing in the Western Cape. Madikizela had said "unfortunately" there was no influx control to regulate the movement of people into the Western Cape. The ANC called for Helen Zille to fire him, angered that he had linked the provision of services to the apartheid policy of influx control. Madikizela was appointed as Provincial Minister of Human Settlements following his re-election in May 2014.

In April 2015, Madikizela was elected deputy provincial leader of the Democratic Alliance in the Western Cape, unseating DA veteran Theuns Botha. He was subsequently named the acting provincial leader in February 2017, when incumbent Patricia de Lille resigned. He was elected to the position for a full term on 7 October 2017.

Madikizela was appointed as Provincial Minister of Transport and Public Works by newly elected premier Alan Winde in May 2019. Madikizela was also the Leader of Government Business in the Provincial Parliament.

In October 2019, he declared his intention to run for interim Federal Leader of the DA following Mmusi Maimane's resignation. Madikizela dropped out of the leadership race on 11 November 2019. John Steenhuisen was elected interim leader on 17 November 2019.

On 26 January 2020, Madikizela announced that he would consider running for DA Federal Leader at the party's Federal Congress. He declined to run for the post on 10 February 2020. He then declared his intention to seek re-election as provincial leader. In mid-November 2020, Madikizela was accused of plotting to assassinate his main competitor for the position, Masizole Mnqasela, the speaker of the provincial parliament. The Federal Legal Commission of the DA "cleared" him of any wrongdoing on 20 November. Madikizela was re-elected as provincial leader on 21 November.

=== Executive Ethics Code violation and qualifications scandal ===
On 1 April 2021, acting Public Protector Kholeka Gcaleka released a report that found that Madikizela had violated the Executive Ethics Codes by making misleading or false statements to the legislature about Brett Herron, a Good MPP. Herron had lodged the complaint. Madikizela rejected the legality of the report and said that he would be seeking legal advice. On 6 April 2021, Madikizela announced that he had applied to be the DA's mayoral candidate for the City of Cape Town. He was up against incumbent mayor Dan Plato and the DA's finance spokesman, Geordin Hill-Lewis.

On 13 April 2021, Daily Maverick reported that Madikizela did not have a Bachelor of Commerce degree in Human Resource Management as previously claimed and that he had misled a journalist in this regard. The next day, the DA subsequently announced that its Federal Legal Commission would investigate claims that he lied about having a BCom degree. Premier Winde suspended Madikizela as Provincial Minister for Transport and Public Works for 14 days effective immediately on 15 April and appointed Tertuis Simmers as acting Provincial Minister. Hours later, the DA provincial chairperson, Jaco Londt, sent a letter to party structures informing them that Madikizela had "voluntarily stepped aside" as provincial leader for the next two weeks and that deputy leader Albert Fritz would be acting provincial leader.

=== Resignation from the provincial leadership and the provincial cabinet ===
On 28 April 2021, the DA announced that Madikizela had resigned as the provincial leader of the party in the Western Cape. Albert Fritz remained as acting provincial leader and was soon elected as interim provincial leader unopposed. Madikizela also resigned from the provincial cabinet and the provincial legislature. He said that he was not pressured to resign, but chose to resign out " of a sense honour".

An attempt to run for provincial leader again in 2023 was unsuccessful.

=== Return to active party work ===
Ahead of the 2024 South African general election, Madikizela emerged as a DA candidate to the National Assembly, and was subsequently elected as a member of parliament (MP) for the party.

== Post-political career ==
In January 2022, News24 reported that premier Winde intended to appoint Madikizela as a special advisor. The appointment was not immediate, because the Department of Public Service and Administration had to first vet the application to ensure that it is in line with associated regulations. On 1 April 2022, the Minister of Public Service and Administration, Ayanda Dlodlo revealed in a reply to a parliamentary question by Good MP Brett Herron that Winde had written to the department asking that Madikizela be paid at salary level 4, which in 2021 had an entry level of R2,008,212 per year, but the department declined the request and instead approved salary level 3 for Madikizela, which pays about R1,739,784 per year.
