= Ian Neilson =

South African civil engineer and politician (born 1954)

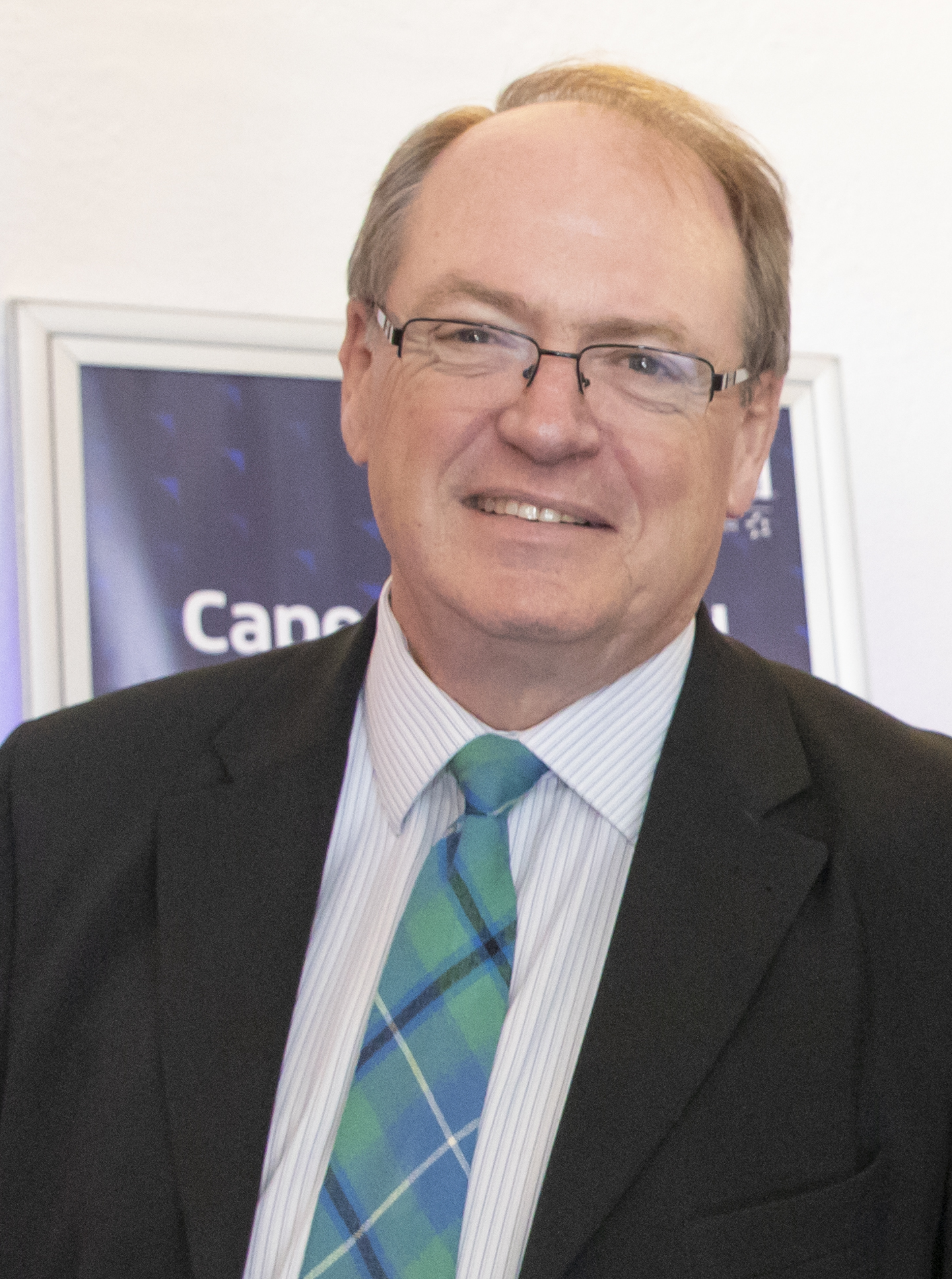

Acting Mayor of Cape Town
- In office 31 October 2018 – 6 November 2018
- Preceded by: Patricia de Lille
- Succeeded by: Dan Plato
- In office 8 May 2018 – 15 May 2018
- Preceded by: Patricia de Lille
- Succeeded by: Patricia de Lille

Deputy Mayor of Cape Town
- In office 27 May 2009 – 31 October 2021
- Mayor: Dan Plato; Patricia de Lille
- Preceded by: Grant Haskin
- Succeeded by: Eddie Andrews

Member of the Cape Town City Council
- Incumbent
- Assumed office 7 December 2000
- Constituency: Ward 3 (2000–2006); Ward 23 (2006–2011); Proportional Representation (2011–present)

Personal details
- Born: 20 October 1954 (age 72) Boksburg, Transvaal Province, South Africa
- Party: Democratic Alliance
- Spouse: Elmarie Neilson
- Education: Boksburg High School; University of Cape Town

Ian Douglas Neilson (born 20 October 1954) is a South African civil engineer and politician who is the longest served Deputy Mayor of Cape Town, from May 2009 to October 2021 (12 years). He also served as the Mayoral Committee Member for Finance from 2006 until 2021 and Executive Councillor for Safety and Health from 2000 until 2002.

He has served as acting Mayor of Cape Town on two brief occasions in 2018, in May and from 31 October until 6 November 2018.

== Early life ==
Neilson was born in Boksburg, South Africa. He matriculated from Boksburg High School in 1971. He obtained a B.Sc. degree in civil engineering from the University of Cape Town in 1975 and a M.Sc. degree in engineering in 1984.

== Professional career ==
Neilson is a civil engineer and practiced as a consulting engineer in the field of water engineering, He worked across South Africa on various engineering projects. Water supply projects that he worked on were a detailed basin study of the Luvuvhu River Basin (a tributary of the Limpopo River) and the Orange-Vaal Rivers Weir project (an envisaged alternative to the Lesotho Highlands Water Supply System). He also worked on a number of flood and storm water projects, most notable of which was the design of the canal system at Century City in Cape Town, which later received an award from the Association of Consulting Engineers. It the latter part of his career he established himself as an expert in pipeline design and pipe network planning.

== Political career ==
Neilson was involved in politics from his student days at the University of Cape Town where he was involved in opposition to the apartheid government of the day.

His first campaign towards elective office was in the 1987 South African general election, when he was a candidate for the Progressive Federal Party (PFP) in the constituency of Pretoria Central. This constituency was a National Party stronghold and he came fourth in the election behind the Conservative Party and the Herstigte Nasionale Party.

He moved back to Cape Town in 1990 and in 1996 was a candidate for the Democratic Party (DP) (a successor of the PFP) in the first local government elections in a new democratic South Africa. He was elected as a Proportional List Councillor to the Council of the Blaauwberg Municipality as the DP's sole representative. He served as a member of the Council's Executive Committee and on the Planning Committee.

In 1999 he was appointed by the Western Cape Minister of Local Government to serve on the Unicity Commission, from 1999 to 2000, that was set up to prepare the consolidation of seven local governments into the Unicity of Cape Town.

Soon before the 5 December 2000 local government election that established the new City of Cape Town, the DP amalgamated with the New National Party (NNP) to form the Democratic Alliance (DA). Neilson was elected as a DA councillor for Ward 3, an area extending from the wealthy area of Bloubergstrand to the low-cost housing town of Dunoon. The DA won a majority in that election in Cape Town. Neilson was elected by the DA caucus to serve in the city's executive as the Executive Councillor for Safety & Health, a position he held until 2002.

In October 2002 a number of former NNP members left the DA to reestablish their former party in the city council. This followed the NNP's withdrawal from the DA the year before. As a result, the DA lost its majority in the Cape Town Council. Ian was shortly thereafter elected as deputy leader of the DA in the council, a position he held for the remainder of the council term.

At the local government election of March 2006, Ian was elected as the Ward Councillor for Ward 23, a newly delimited ward that extends from Melkbosstrand to Bloubergstrand and parts of Table View. The DA was returned as the largest party in the City of Cape Town. It formed a multiparty government under the leadership of Executive Mayor Helen Zille. Mayor Zille appointed Neilson as the Mayoral committee member for Finance.

== Deputy Mayor of Cape Town ==
At the national and provincial elections on 22 April 2009, the DA won a majority in the Western Cape Provincial Parliament. Helen Zille was elected as Premier of the Western Cape Province and ceased to be the Executive Mayor of Cape Town. In the aftermath of these changes, Dan Plato was elected by the Council as the new Executive Mayor and the composition of the city's multi-party government was changed. Neilson was elected by the Council as Executive Deputy Mayor on 27 May 2009. He retained the Finance portfolio and chairmanship of the city's 2010 FIFA World Cup committee.

Neilson oversaw the construction of the new Cape Town Stadium at Green Point, that served as the venue for the FIFA World Cup. He also held oversight over the Stadium Company as well as the Cape Town Convention Centre Company, for much of his time as Deputy Mayor.

The 2011 Local Government Election saw the Democratic Alliance returned to office with an improved vote share. It won 61% of the total vote. Neilson was returned as a Proportional List Councillor. He was reelected by the Council as Deputy Mayor and the Mayor reappointed him as the Mayoral Committee Member for Finance.

After the 2016 Local Government election when the Cape Town City Council reconvened, he was re-elected to a third term as Deputy Mayor of Cape Town.

On 8 May 2018, the Democratic Alliance ceased Mayor Patricia de Lille's party membership, effectively removing her as Mayor of Cape Town and councillor with immediate effect. Neilson served ex-officio as acting Mayor until a new Mayor was set to be elected. Neilson declared his candidacy for the post, but subsequently lost to former Cape Town Mayor, Dan Plato.

He remained as Deputy Mayor for the rest of the term of office, during which Plato reappointed him as Mayoral Committee member for Finance.

Neilson's 15-year term as Mayoral Committee Member for Finance saw a strong improvement in the City's financial position. It moved from a near-insolvent position in 2006 with adverse audit opinions, to a well-funded and growing cashflow position and clean audits. He initiated city borrowings on the South African Bond Market. The financial position of the City enabled it to constantly grow the capital budget and expenditure on repairs and maintenance of city assets.

At the 2021 election, due to term limits, Neilson could not serve a further term as Deputy Mayor, having already exceeded the two terms of office permitted (his initial two years in the office, having started after the start of the term, did not count towards the term limit).

Neilson was reelected as a Proportional List City Councillor in the 2021 municipal election. He has served the term as the Chairman of the Water and Sanitation Portfolio Committee, the Chairman of the Planning Appeals Advisory Panel and the Chairman of the Disciplinary Committee.
