= Nomzamo =

Suburb and township of Cape Town in Western Cape, South Africa

Lwandle/Nomzamo
- Location within Western Cape Location within South Africa
- Coordinates: 34.115°S 18.86°E
- Country: South Africa
- Province: Western Cape
- Municipality: City of Cape Town

Area
  - Total: 3.56 km^{2} (1.37 sq mi)

Population (2011)
  - Total: 60,528
  - Density: 17,000/km^{2} (44,000/sq mi)

Racial makeup (2011)
  - Black African: 93.3%
  - Coloured: 4.0%
  - Indian/Asian: 0.1%
  - White: 0.3%
  - Other: 2.3%

First languages (2011)
  - Xhosa: 74.4%
  - Sotho: 5.6%
  - Afrikaans: 5.3%
  - English: 3.2%
  - Other: 11.6%
- Time zone: UTC+2 (SAST)

Nomzamo is a small township Near Lwandle in the Helderberg basin just outside Strand in the Western Cape of South Africa. Both names are sometimes used interchangeably referring to both places. This may be attributed to the fact that Nomzamo was born as a result of overpopulation in Lwandle area which initially designed as a cheap accommodation for "single male workers" during the apartheid years.

== Brief history of Lwandle/Nomzamo ==
Before Nomzamo was established as a first township in the area in the early 1990s, Lwandle was conceived in 1958 to accommodate single male workers. Before then the area where Lwandle is located was a farm which was owned by CPJ van Vuuren and sold to the Stellenbosch Divisional Council of South African government in 1956 for approximately £14500 (British pound) because the land was no longer profitable due to winter rains which drowned his crops, and the farm also became desolate. It was established in terms of Government Notice no. 71 of 1958. Unlike other areas where black people live mostly in the outskirts of the cities such as Langa, Khayelitsha, and Gugulethu, Lwandle was not developed as a Township but as a hostel type accommodation. In term of the Group Areas Act of 1950, which specify residential areas according to one’s race Lwandle was designed in the centre of white areas surrounded by Gordons Bay, Somerset West and Strand. This was unusual for black area to be in the centre of white areas and Lwandle was unique in this sense and referred to as the black spot of Helderberg. (Use the link below to view the area in 1940)

Historical topographic maps of Cape Town

The actual hostel structures were built in 1960 to accommodate about 500 male migrants who mostly came from the former homelands in the Eastern Cape such as Transkei and Ciskei. These men were mostly black Africans coming from the former homelands of Transkei and Ciskein in the Eastern Cape working in farms and fruit canning industry and other surrounding areas. Whether these male migrants were married or not, they were not allowed to bring their family member including wives and children into the hostels. As such they were referred to as single males and the hostels were referred as batchelor’s hostels.(Use the link below to view the area in 1960)

Historical topographic maps of Cape Town

Black people who were staying in Lwandle like any other areas in the city were required to carry a Pass Book commonly known as Dompass outside their homelands or designated areas. This book, which captures personal details of each individual including the name of the employer, working times, your race and origin amongst others was designed essentially to control the movement of black people in urban areas or cities and to make sure that they remain as visitors in white men’s areas. For example, if a person was to be found in Strand after his hours of work he could be arrested and fined or his Passbook stamped with a criminal record.

During 1980s there was a lot of revolt against apartheid regime in South Africa. This has resulted in international boycotts from other countries which did not support apartheid. On July 23, 1986, the South African government lifted the requirement to carry passbooks, although the pass law system itself was repealed in November that same year. As the result people started sneaking illegally into Lwandle including women. Around this time the area that was designed to accommodate only 500 men had a population of about 3000 people and informal areas known as Umgababa A and B (Greenfields in present day) started to develop around the hostels.(Use the link below to view the area in 1980)

Historical topographic maps of Cape Town

The government relocated some of the people to Waterkloof farm which is known as Chris Nissen Park today. Unlike Lwandle, Waterkloof was a farm with no facilities like toilets and water for resident. People who were staying in Waterkloof were forced to come to Lwandle to access facilities such as water and toilets. But because they had to cross the N2 national road there were many fatal accidents. The government sought a permanent solution and started building some houses in Nomzamo, the first official township in Lwandle in the early 1990s. Some people were relocated to Mfuleni some few kilometers from Khayelitsha.(Use the link below to view the area in 1990 and 2000)

Historical topographic maps of Cape Town Historical topographic maps of Cape Town

In 2011 Lwandle had a population of approximately 60500 people and currently growing every year. It is now a mixed area but mostly dominated by isiXhosa speaking people including other locals and internationals. The hostels were converted into family units in between 1997 and 2003 under the Reconstruction and Development Programme initiated by democratic government after the first election in 1994. The units were fitted with geysers and solar system including the toilets and showers inside. A half block of hostel 33 was the only part of the hostels that was not modified and now serves as part of the Lwandle Migrant Labour Museum.

Historical topographic maps of Cape Town
