= Cayla Murray =

South African politician (b. 1994)

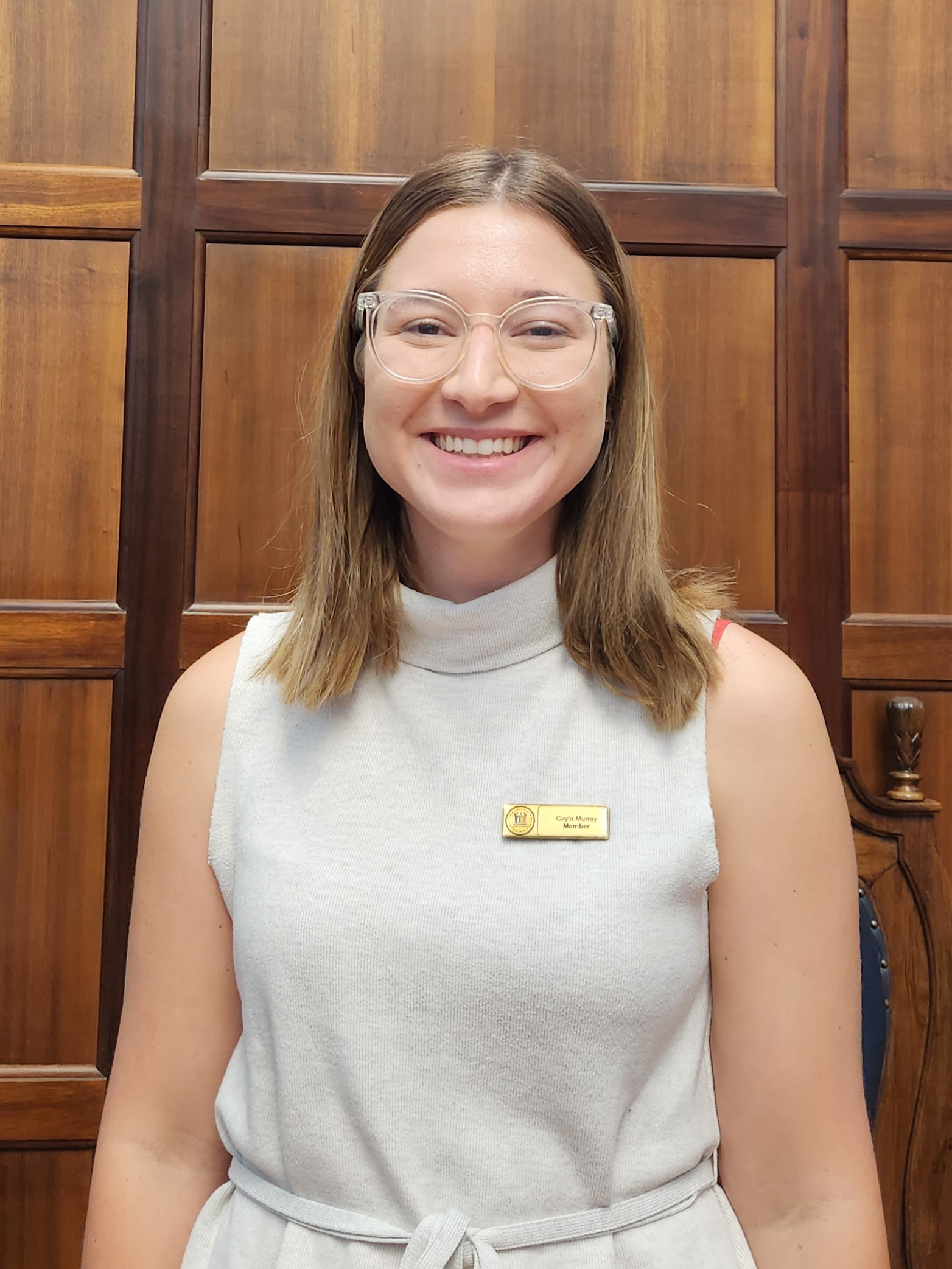
- Cayla Murray as chairperson of the Standing Committee on Finance, Economic Opportunities and Tourism.

Member of the Western Cape Provincial Parliament
- In office 3 August 2022 – 28 May 2024

Personal details
- Born: Cayla Ann Tomšs Murray; 19 July 1994 (age 32)
- Party: Democratic Alliance
- Education: Brunel University London (BSc); SOAS University of London (MSc)
- Profession: Civil servant Politician

Cayla Ann Tomás Murray (born 19 July 1994) is a South African politician and former civil servant who served as the chairperson of the Standing Committee on Finance, Economic Opportunities and Tourism in the Western Cape Provincial Parliament and as a Democratic Alliance Member of the Provincial Parliament from August 2022 until May 2024.

== Early life and education ==
Murray was born on 19 July 1994. Murray studied International Relations and Politics at Brunel University London, graduating with a first in 2016. She completed her postgraduate studies in African Politics at SOAS University of London in 2017, also graduating with a first.

== Career ==
Murray worked as an assistant researcher at Brunel University from November 2013 to March 2014, as an administrator for Liberal Democrat Women from June 2016 to September 2017, as a Media Researcher and Content Producer at the Democratic Alliance from January 2018 to October 2018, and as spokesperson to the Western Cape Minister of Social Development from October 2018 until June 2019 before working as spokesperson to the Western Cape Minister of Community Safety between June 2019 and April 2021. Murray worked as spokesperson to Western Cape Premier Alan Winde from April 2021 before joining the Western Cape Provincial Parliament in August 2022.

== Provincial Parliament ==
Murray was sworn in as a Democratic Alliance Member of the Western Cape Provincial Parliament on 3 August 2022. On 11 August 2022, Murray was elected unopposed as chairperson of the Standing Committee on Finance, Economic Opportunities and Tourism. Murray left the provincial parliament at the 2024 election. Murray is the youngest elected Member of the Western Cape Provincial Parliament history to date.
