= Eddie Andrews (rugby union) =

South African rugby union player

Alderman Eddie Andrews

Deputy Mayor of Cape Town
- Incumbent
- Assumed office 18 November 2021
- Mayor: Geordin Hill-Lewis
- Preceded by: Ian Neilson

Member of the Cape Town City Council
- Incumbent
- Assumed office 21 May 2011

Personal details
- Born: Edwin Peter Andrews; 18 March 1977 (age 49) Cape Town, South Africa
- Party: Democratic Alliance
- Education: Steenberg High School
- Height: 6.1 ft (1.9 m)
- Weight: 253 lb (115 kg)

Rugby union career
- Position: Prop
Provincial / State sides
Years	Team	Apps	(Points)
2000–2006	Western Province	43	(5)
- Correct as of 25 June 2014
Super Rugby
Years	Team	Apps	(Points)
2003–2007	Stormers	47	(20)
- Correct as of 25 June 2014
International career
Years	Team	Apps	(Points)
2004–2007	South Africa	23	(0)
- Correct as of 25 June 2014

Edwin Peter Andrews (born 18 March 1977) is a South African politician serving as the Deputy Mayor of Cape Town; a position he has held since November 2021. Andrews also serves as the City of Cape Town's Mayoral Committee (MayCo) Member for Spatial Planning and Environment.

A former rugby union footballer, his usual position was prop, and he played for the Springboks. He played for the Stormers in the Super 14 between 2003 and 2007.

== Rugby career ==
Andrews made his provincial debut for Western Province against Eastern Province in the Vodacom Cup in 2000. Three seasons later he made his Super 12 debut for the Stormers against the Hurricanes.

Andrews made his international debut for South Africa on Saturday, 12 June 2004 in Bloemfontein in a match against Ireland. South Africa won the match 31–17. He also played in the subsequent match against the Irish in Cape Town which was also won by South Africa and was a reserve in the victory over Wales in Pretoria.

He went on to play against the Pacific Islanders team in Gosford before he was included in the Springboks' 2004 Tri Nations series squad. He played four tests during the series, two tests against the All Blacks and the Wallabies. The Springboks went on to win the Tri Nations that year. He earned another three caps during the end-of-year tests in the northern hemisphere.

He next played for South Africa on 18 June 2005 in a 30-all draw against France in Durban, as well as playing in subsequent matches against Australia, and then against the All Blacks in the 2005 Tri Nations series. He earned another two caps at the end of the year, playing Argentina in Buenos Aires and France in Paris.

He played in the three 2006 mid-year rugby tests, in the two wins against Scotland and the loss to France. He was then named in the Springboks' 2006 Tri Nations series squad.

He retired from professional rugby in 2007 due to spinal stenosis which was complicated by a recurring back injury. During this time he founded a non-profit organisation, Joshua Foundation, with his Stormers team mate Tonderai Chavhanga.

=== Test history ===
No.	Opposition	Result (SA 1st)	Position	Tries	Date	Venue
1.	Ireland	31–17	Tighthead prop		12 Jun 2004	Free State Stadium, Bloemfontein
2.	Ireland	26–17	Tighthead prop		19 Jun 2004	Newlands Stadium, Cape Town
3.	Wales	53–18	Replacement		26 Jun 2004	Loftus Versfeld, Pretoria
4.	Pacific Islanders	38–24	Tighthead prop		17 Jul 2004	Central Coast Stadium, Gosford
5.	New Zealand	21–23	Tighthead prop		24 Jul 2004	Jade Stadium, Christchurch
6.	Australia	26–30	Tighthead prop		31 Jul 2004	Subiaco Oval, Perth
7.	New Zealand	40–26	Tighthead prop		14 Aug 2004	Ellis Park, Johannesburg
8.	Australia	23–19	Tighthead prop		21 Aug 2004	Kings Park, Durban
9.	Wales	38–36	Replacement		6 Nov 2004	Millennium Stadium, Cardiff
10.	Ireland	12–17	Tighthead prop		13 Nov 2004	Lansdowne Road, Dublin
11.	England	16–32	Tighthead prop		20 Nov 2004	Twickenham, London
12.	France	30–30	Tighthead prop		18 Jun 2005	Kings Park, Durban
13.	Australia	33–20	Tighthead prop		23 Jul 2005	Ellis Park, Johannesburg
14.	New Zealand	27–31	Replacement		27 Aug 2005	Carisbrook, Dunedin
15.	Argentina	34–23	Replacement		5 Nov 2005	José Amalfitani Stadium, Buenos Aires
16.	France	20–26	Replacement		26 Nov 2005	Stade de France, Paris
17.	Scotland	36–16	Tighthead prop		10 Jun 2006	Kings Park, Durban
18.	Scotland	29–15	Tighthead prop		17 Jun 2006	Boet Erasmus Stadium, Port Elizabeth
19.	France	26–36	Tighthead prop		24 Jun 2006	Newlands, Cape Town
20.	Australia	0–49	Replacement		15 Jul 2006	Suncorp Stadium, Brisbane
21.	New Zealand	17–35	Replacement		22 Jul 2006	Westpac Stadium, Wellington
22.	Australia	17–25	Replacement		7 Jul 2007	Telstra Stadium, Sydney
23.	New Zealand	6–33	Replacement		14 Jul 2007	Jade Stadium, Christchurch

== Political career ==
Andrews later joined the Democratic Alliance and was elected to the Cape Town City Council. He served as the ward councillor for ward 78 (Mitchells Plain), before being elected as the ward councillor for ward 73 (Diep River and Meadowridge) in 2021. On 18 November 2021, Andrews was elected as the Deputy Mayor of Cape Town, succeeding Ian Neilson, who had announced his retirement from the role after twelve years.

== See also ==
- List of South Africa national rugby union players – Springbok no. 759
