= Universal Party (South Africa) =

The Universal Party was a minor political party in South Africa. In the election of 22 April 2009 it appeared only on the Western Cape provincial ballot, and received 599 votes (0.03% of votes cast).

It did not contest the 2014 election and is no longer registered by the Independent Electoral Commission.
