= National Party South Africa (2008) =

Right-wing South African political party

- President: Achmat Williams
- Co-Deputy Leader: Elizabeth Bantam
- National Organiser: Steven Taylor
- Director of Policy & Strategy: Dries Oelofse
- Director of Electoral Affairs: Mark Naidoo
- Founder: Achmat Williams; David Sasman; Juan-Duval Uys; Abdullah Omar
- Founded: 5 August 2008
- Dissolved: 2019
- Split from: New National Party
- Merged into: Democratic Alliance; National Freedom Party
- Headquarters: Paul Sauer building, 1 Adderly Street, Cape Town
- Youth wing: National Party South Africa Youth League
- Ideology: National conservatism Federalism; Nationalism; Non-racialism; Anti-LGBT; Anti-DA; Anti-ANC
- Political position: Right-wing
- Colours: Blue, white, orange and green
- Slogan: Enough is Enough
- City of Cape Town council seats (2011): 1 / 221

Website
- www.nationalparty.co.za

The National Party of South Africa (NP), also called the National Party, was a right-wing South African political party. It competed for the Western Cape province in the 2009 provincial election and municipal council seats in the 2011 local government elections.

== History ==
On 5 August 2008 a new party using the National Party name was formed and registered with the Independent Electoral Commission. The initial leadership was held by David Sasman, Juan-Duval Uys, Abdullah Omar, (all previously with the controversial National People's Party) and a fourth person, not immediately named, who later turned out to be Achmat Williams. Williams, a former New National Party (NNP) politician, was a member of the Independent Democrats before co-founding the new party. Other than some low-level former members, the new party had no formal connection with the now defunct NNP. The relaunched National Party of 2008 promoted a non-racial democratic South Africa based on federal principles and the legacy of F.W De Klerk.

A press release issued by Jean-Duval Uys on the party's website, dated 22 January 2009, deals with a Cape High Court challenge against Uys by Williams and Omar on behalf of themselves and Sasman for leadership of the party ahead of the 2009 general election. Before the court case was finalised, Uys announced that he had joined the Congress of the People. Williams was listed as the national leader on the party's website.

== Dissolution ==
In 2019, due to lack of support, the National Party was dissolved after the NP federal council voted to disband. It merged into the National Freedom Party (while some of its members decided to join the DA) and Achmat Williams resigned as party leader.

== Policies ==
The party had the following principal policies:

- improving the standard of education, and providing it for free
- providing better and free quality health care
- increase of state pensions
- free feeding schemes in schools
- abolition of same-sex marriage
- reinstatement of capital punishment for convicted murderers and rapists
- reintroduction of religious instruction and corporal punishment in schools

== Participation ==
Although the party was on the ballot for the Western Cape Provincial Parliament in the 2009 poll, they only attracted 3,378 votes and failed to secure a seat. They nominated several candidates registered for the 2011 local government elections, one of whom, Bonita Elvira Hufkie, was listed on her ward ballot for both the National Party and the Pan Africanist Congress. The NP failed to win any wards, but obtained one council seat through the proportional representation (PR) vote, which was filled by Achmat Williams, who topped the party's PR candidate list.

== Parliament ==
National Assembly
Election year	# of overall votes	% of overall vote	# of overall seats won	+/–
2009	3,378	0.17	0 / 400	–
2014	2,694	0.13	0 / 400	–

== Provincial elections ==
Election	Eastern Cape		Free State		Gauteng		KwaZulu-Natal		Limpopo		Mpumalanga		North-West		Northern Cape		Western Cape	
Election	%	Seats	%	Seats	%	Seats	%	Seats	%	Seats	%	Seats	%	Seats	%	Seats	%	Seats
2014	–	–	–	–	–	–	–	–	–	–	–	–	–	–	–	–	0.13%	0/42
2009	–	–	–	–	–	–	–	–	–	–	–	–	–	–	–	–	0.17%	0/42

== See also ==
- National Party (South Africa)
- New National Party (South Africa)
- Spectrum National Party
