= Patricia de Lille =

South African politician

The Honourable Patricia de Lille MP
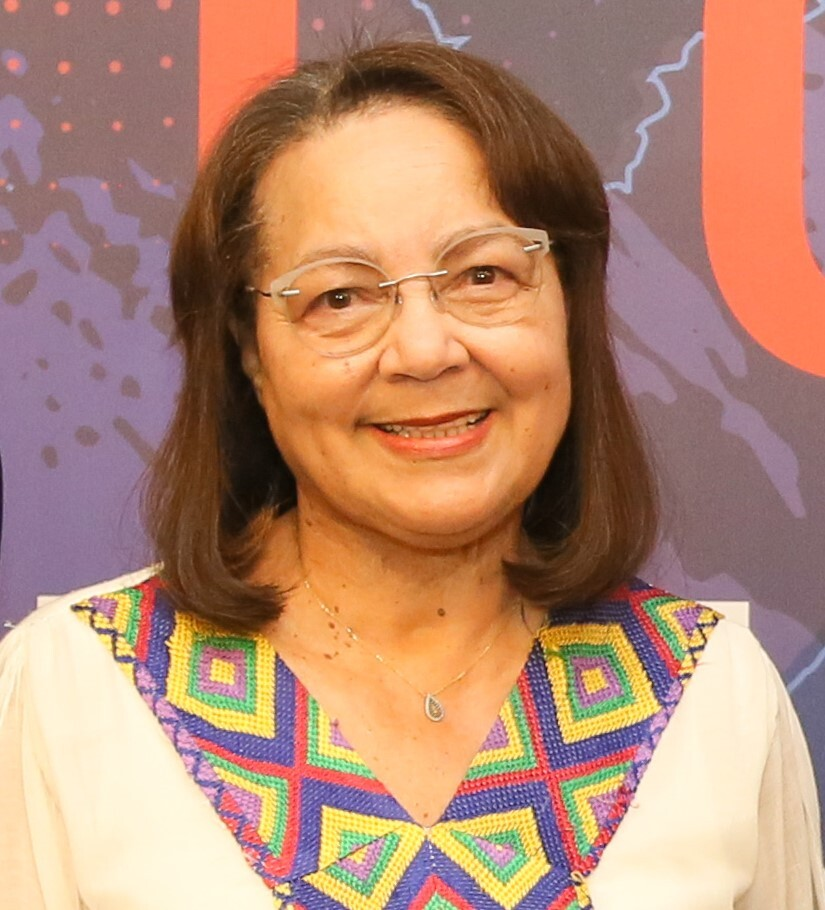
- de Lille in 2023

Minister of Tourism
- Incumbent
- Assumed office 6 March 2023
- President: Cyril Ramaphosa
- Deputy: Fish Mahlalela; Maggie Sotyu
- Preceded by: Lindiwe Sisulu

Minister of Public Works and Infrastructure
- In office 30 May 2019 – 6 March 2023
- President: Cyril Ramaphosa
- Deputy: Noxolo Kiviet
- Preceded by: Position established
- Succeeded by: Sihle Zikalala

Leader of Good
- Incumbent
- Assumed office 2 December 2018
- Preceded by: Party founded

Member of the National Assembly of South Africa
- Incumbent
- Assumed office 22 May 2019
- In office 10 May 1994 – 10 September 2010

Mayor of Cape Town
- In office 1 June 2011 – 31 October 2018; Mayorship suspended: 8–15 May 2018
- Deputy: Ian Neilson
- Preceded by: Dan Plato
- Succeeded by: Ian Neilson (acting); Dan Plato

Western Cape Provincial Minister of Social Development
- In office 22 September 2010 – 31 May 2011
- Premier: Helen Zille
- Preceded by: Ivan Meyer
- Succeeded by: Albert Fritz

Leader of the Independent Democrats
- In office 21 June 2003 – 21 May 2014
- Preceded by: Party founded
- Succeeded by: Party merged into Democratic Alliance

Member of the Western Cape Provincial Parliament
- In office 22 September 2010 – 31 May 2011

Provincial Leader of the Democratic Alliance in the Western Cape
- In office 18 April 2015 – 1 February 2017
- Deputy: Bonginkosi Madikizela
- Preceded by: Ivan Meyer
- Succeeded by: Bonginkosi Madikizela

Personal details
- Born: Patricia Lindt; 17 February 1951 (age 75) Beaufort West, Cape Province, Union of South Africa
- Party: Good (2018–present)
- Other party: Democratic Alliance (2010–2018); Independent Democrats (2003–2014); Pan Africanist Congress (1987–2003)
- Spouse: Edwin de Lille (m. 1972; died 2021)
- Relations: Sarah Paulse (sister)
- Children: 1
- Occupation: Politician; legislator; trade unionist; anti-apartheid activist
- Profession: Chemical technologist

Patricia de Lille (née Lindt; born 17 February 1951) is a South African politician who is the current Minister of Tourism and leader of the political party Good. She served as Minister of Public Works and Infrastructure from 2019 to 2023.

She was previously Mayor of Cape Town from 2011 to 2018 and before that, Western Cape Provincial Minister of Social Development from 2010 to 2011. She founded and led the Independent Democrats (ID), a political party which she formed in 2003 during a floor-crossing window, after she broke away from the Pan Africanist Congress (PAC). In August 2010, the ID merged with the Democratic Alliance, South Africa's official opposition, and the party was officially dissolved in 2014. From 2015 to 2017, she was Provincial Leader of the Democratic Alliance in the Western Cape.

De Lille was selected as the DA's mayoral candidate in Cape Town, defeating incumbent Dan Plato, ahead of the 2011 local government elections, where she was elected mayor. She was re-elected to a second term as mayor in the 2016 local government elections.

De Lille was voted 22nd in the Top 100 Great South Africans, and is noted for her role in investigations into the country's controversial Arms Deal.

On 8 May 2018, the DA's Federal Executive ceased De Lille's party membership, thereby removing her as mayor of the DA governed city. The Western Cape High Court temporarily suspended her removal. On 5 August 2018, De Lille announced her intention to resign as Mayor of Cape Town. She resigned as mayor and terminated her DA party membership on 31 October 2018.

Consequently, she formed Good in December 2018, and was announced as the party's Western Cape Premier candidate in February 2019. She was elected to Parliament in May 2019 and took office as a Member on 22 May 2019. On 29 May 2019, De Lille was appointed by President Cyril Ramaphosa as Minister of Public Works and Infrastructure. In March 2023, she became the Minister of Tourism and was reappointed on 30 June 2024.

== Background ==
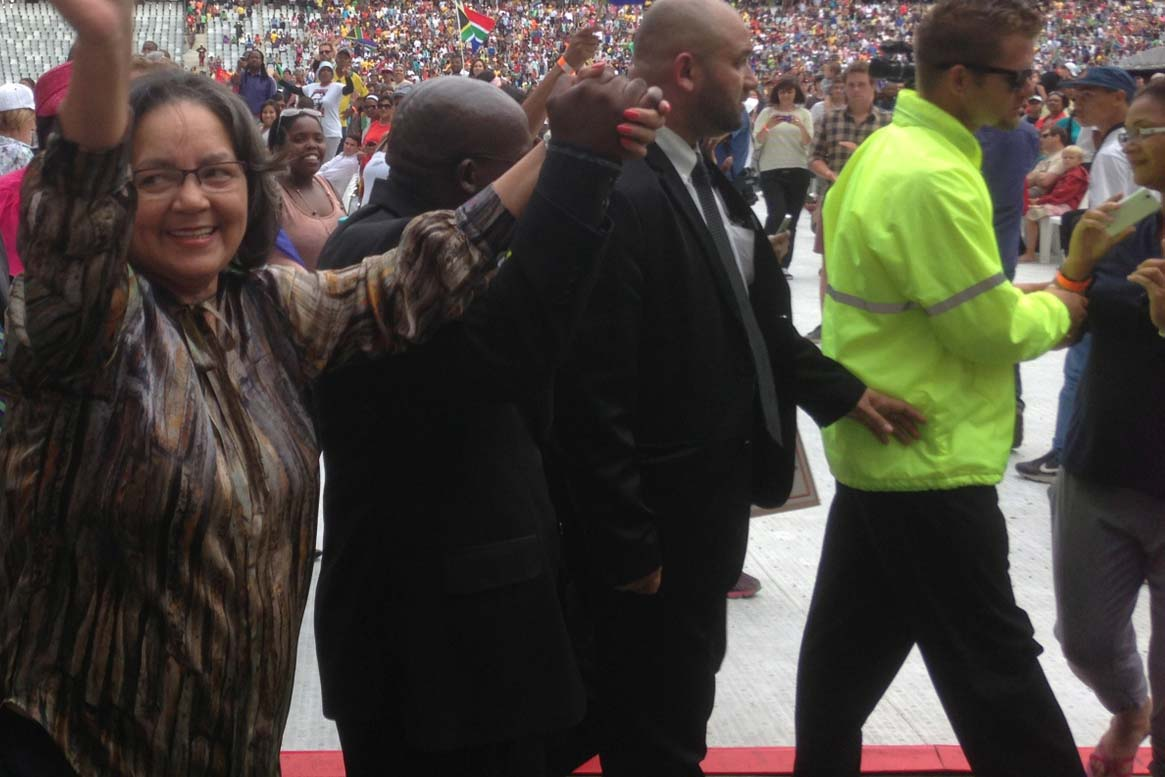
De Lille at the Nelson Mandela memorial concert at the Cape Town Stadium in 2013

De Lille was born in 1951 in Beaufort West, and attended Bastiaanse Hoërskool. In 1974 she became a laboratory technician at a factory. She worked for the same company until 1990. During this time, she became involved in the South African Chemical Workers Union, starting off as a shop steward and then becoming regional secretary, before being elected as a National Executive Member in 1983. In 1988, she was elected as National Vice-President of The National Council of Trade Unions (NACTU), the highest position for a woman in the trade union movement at that time.

== Political career ==
In 1989, De Lille was elected onto the National Executive Committee of the Pan Africanist Movement (PAM). She led a delegation in the constitutional negotiations that preceded South Africa's first democratic election in 1994, and following her election as a Pan Africanist Congress (PAC) MP, she was appointed as Chairperson of the Parliamentary Committee on Transport from 1994 to 1999. She also served on various portfolio Committees including Health, Minerals and Energy, Trade and Industry, Communications, the Rules Committee and the Code of Ethics.

Later, she made use of parliamentary privilege to be a whistle-blower on the South African Arms Deal.

In 2003, De Lille made use of a floor crossing window to break with the PAC, and form her own party, the Independent Democrats.

== Issues ==
=== Arms Deal ===
De Lille led the call for an investigation into alleged corruption in South Africa's purchase of weapons costing £4bn from British and other European manufacturers (that cost has soared on the basis of foreign currency collapses to more than its original cost although the Rand £ and Rand $ exchange rates have now reduced the costs to almost the same level as the original cost.). The government rejected De Lille's calls for an independent inquiry to be led by Judge Willem Heath. De Lille said she was accused of being unpatriotic and embarrassing the country as a consequence of her efforts to investigate the Arms Deal."

On 5 April 2009, the Independent Democrats confirmed De Lille's attendance at the announcement of the National Prosecuting Authority the following day regarding its decision either to drop or to maintain its case against ANC President Jacob Zuma, who had been implicated in the Arms Deal. In an op-ed for The Sunday Times, De Lille predicted that the charges would be dropped:

Am I angry? Of course I am angry. I am angry because the majority of our people are not seeing the warning signs that are coming from the ANC, a liberation party that has no respect for the Constitution and the rule of law and is prepared to erode both just so that one man can become the leader of our country.

By letting these ANC crooks off the hook we are sending entirely the wrong message to our people. Government is saying that there is a way out for those who break the law.

On the morning of the NPA's much-awaited announcement, De Lille was turned away from proceedings, being told that, as a member of the public, she would have to find a television set. Leader of the Democratic Alliance Helen Zille was met with the same fate.

== Awards and recognition ==
De Lille was awarded the Freedom of the City of Birmingham, Alabama, and in 2004 was awarded the honour of being one of the Top 5 Women in Government and Government Agencies. She was also awarded the 2004 Old Mutual South African Leadership Award in the Category of Woman Leadership.

De Lille was voted 22nd in the Top 100 Great South Africans, and is noted for her role in investigations into the country's controversial Arms Deal.

In July 2006 she was the first woman to be recognised as Honorary Colonel of 84 Signal Unit in the South African National Defence Force. In August 2006 she received the City Press and Rapport Newspaper award as one of top 10 women in South Africa.

A Markinor survey conducted in 2004 found that De Lille was South Africa's favourite politician after Thabo Mbeki.

== Joining the DA ==
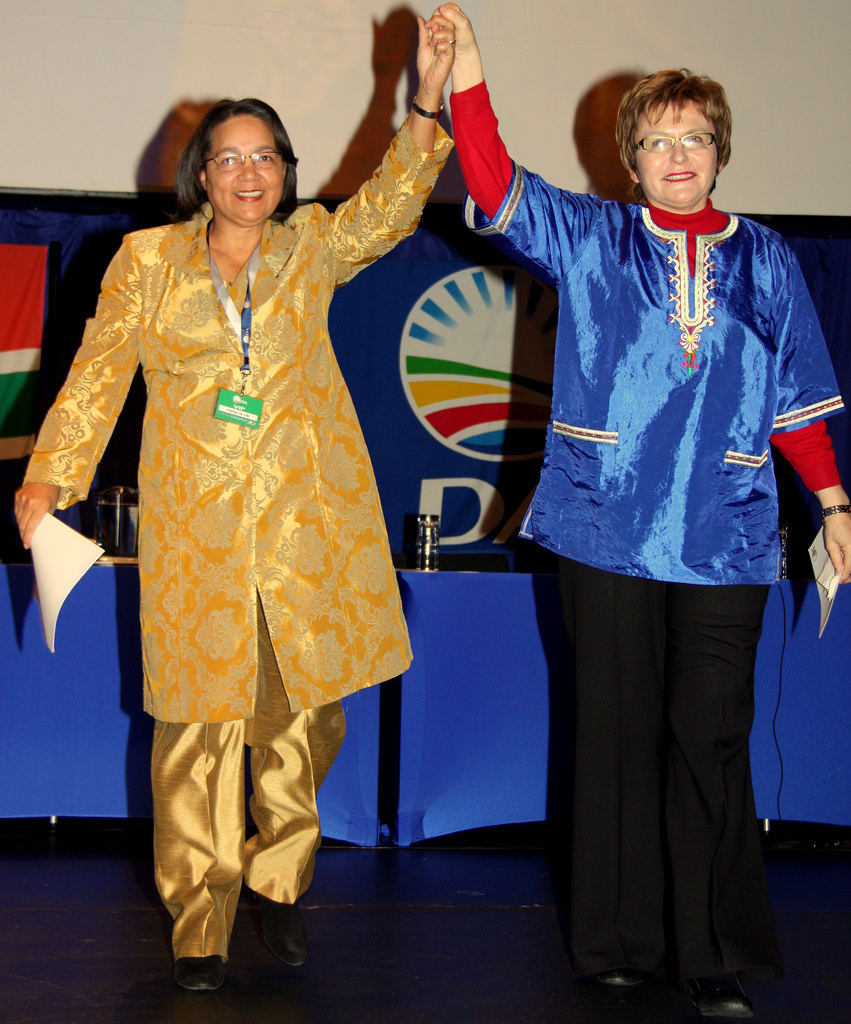
De Lille with DA Leader Helen Zille, 2010.

On 13 August 2010, after meetings with both the DA and ID executive, it was decided that the ID would indeed merge with the DA. On 15 August 2010, De Lille and DA Leader Helen Zille announced to the public that the ID would join the DA.

== Controversies ==
During the 2004 general election, disgruntled former members of the Independent Democrats accused her of running the party in a "undemocratic" manner – in direct contrast with the image of transparency and accountability that she grounded her party on. De Lille told reporters that the dissenters had been fired from the party for fraud and corruption.

As Mayor of Cape Town, De Lille has been perceived to have had a conflict of interest regarding the private sector developments by friends of hers in Clifton. As mayor, De Lille was accused by businessman Anthony Faul of demanding a R5 million bribe so as to secure a procurement contract to supply fire extinguishers in 2013.

== Party infighting and resignation as Mayor of Cape Town ==
In September 2017, De Lille controversially ordered that the City of Cape Town's special investigations unit be closed against the wishes of the city's committee member for safety, security and social services Jean-Pierre Smith. The closure of the investigative unit led to allegations that de Lille improperly benefited from security upgrades at public expense to her home. The security upgrades allegations were investigated by the auditor-general and dismissed.

Following the closure of the unit and a breakdown in the working relationship between De Lille and Smith, the Democratic Alliance charged De Lille with misconduct amid allegations against her of intimidation, criminality and misconduct.

On 15 February 2018, she survived a vote of no confidence by one vote (110 no votes, 109 yes votes and 3 abstentions). Following the no confidence vote, an internal vote within the DA caucus governing the City of Cape Town occurred on 25 April 2018. A majority of the DA councillors voted for the removal of De Lille as mayor.

On 8 May 2018, the DA's Federal Executive terminated De Lille's membership. Federal executive chairperson James Selfe said De Lille's membership was terminated after an interview De Lille did with Radio 702 radio host Eusebius McKaiser, where she said that she would resign once she had cleared her name. Her expulsion from the Democratic Alliance meant that she could no longer remain as mayor of Cape Town. The Western Cape High Court temporarily suspended her removal, and heard arguments about her removal on 4–5 June 2018. The Cape Town City Council voted on 31 May 2018 to strip De Lille of her executive powers. On 27 June 2018, the Western Cape High Court voted unanimously to reinstate De Lille's party membership, finding that the DA had failed to follow its own constitution when it invoked its cessation clause against De Lille. In July 2018, a vote of no confidence was scheduled, but was later withdrawn.

On 5 August 2018, the Democratic Alliance National Leader, Mmusi Maimane, announced at a joint news conference that the party had reached a "mutual agreement" with De Lille. The agreement being that De Lille would resign as Mayor of Cape Town and that the party would withdraw all internal charges against her. She would also remain a member of the Democratic Alliance. The announcement of her resignation came a day before the party's disciplinary proceedings would have started.

In September 2018, the Democratic Alliance announced that Dan Plato would succeed De Lille. She left office on 31 October 2018. She also resigned as a member of the Democratic Alliance.

== Leader of Good and national government ==
When De Lille resigned as Mayor of Cape Town, she mentioned that she would take two weeks off of public life, while she writes her book and evaluates her choices. It was suspected de Lille would either revive her old political party, the Independent Democrats, or either join the African National Congress or the Economic Freedom Fighters.

On 18 November 2018, De Lille launched the "For Good" political movement and website. She said at the event that she would form a new political party.

On 2 December 2018, De Lille announced the formation of a new political party named Good. Other disgruntled former Democratic Alliance members, such as Brett Herron and Shaun August, were present at the event. She also said that the political party is registered with the IEC and would contest the 2019 general election.

De Lille was announced as the Good Party's Western Cape Premier candidate on 10 February 2019. On 16 February 2019, she officially launched the "Aunty Pat for Premier Campaign" in Wesbank near Delft outside Cape Town.

Following the May 2019 general elections, De Lille was sworn in as a Member of the National Assembly of South Africa, and was appointed Minister of Public Works and Infrastructure by President Cyril Ramaphosa.

During a cabinet reshuffle in March 2023, she was appointed as Minister of Tourism by President Cyril Ramaphosa.

In 2024 general election Good won one seat in Parliament (National Assembly) and Patricia de Lille was the sole Good elected MP.

In June 2024, Good agreed to join the ANC-led government of national unity (GNU). Leader of the Good, Patricia De Lille, continued as tourism minister in the coalition.

== Unite for Change ==
In October 2025, a new party Unite for Change was formed, with de Lille as one of the members of the Leader's Council. The party will be a merger of Good, Rise Mzansi and Build One South Africa, with the parties combining for the 2026 South African municipal elections, but continuing to exist independently until the next national election scheduled for 2029.

== Personal life ==
De Lille's husband, Edwin, died after a long illness on 7 February 2021. They were married for 49 years and had one son, Allistair.

Political offices
Preceded by Dan Plato	Mayor of Cape Town; 2011–2018	Succeeded by Dan Plato
Preceded by Ivan Meyer	Provincial Minister of Social Development (Western Cape); 2010–2011	Succeeded by Albert Fritz
Party political offices
New political party	Leader of the Good; 2018–present	Incumbent
Preceded by Ivan Meyer	Provincial Leader of the Western Cape Democratic Alliance; 2015–2017	Succeeded by Bonginkosi Madikizela
New political party	Leader of the Independent Democrats; 2003–2014	Succeeded by Position Abolished
