= Grant Haskin =

South African politician

Deputy Mayor of Cape Town
- In office 31 October 2007 – 27 May 2009
- Mayor: Helen Zille; Dan Plato
- Preceded by: Charlotte Williams
- Succeeded by: Ian Neilson

Mayor of Cape Town Acting
- In office 29 April 2009 – 12 May 2009
- Preceded by: Helen Zille
- Succeeded by: Dan Plato

Personal details
- Born: 1968 (age 57–58) Cape Town
- Party: African Christian Democratic Party
- Spouse: Melissa Haskin (Divorced)
- Children: 1
- Education: University of the Western Cape

Grant Haskin (born 1968) is currently serving as Member of the Cape Town City Council and leader of the African Christian Democratic Party in the Cape Town City Council. He previously served as executive deputy mayor of Cape Town, acting mayor of Cape Town, mayoral committee member for community services and sports and amenities. He served in the Western Cape Provincial Parliament for two periods. While a member of the Provincial Parliament, he served as chairman of the Standing Committee on Public Accounts (SCOPA) and special delegate to the National Council of the Provinces.

Within the African Christian Democratic Party, Grant has been elected to provincial secretary general (1999–2005), provincial chairman (2005–2009), provincial leader (2009–2011), federal council chair (2013 to date), national elections manager (2016 local government elections, 2019 national general elections and 2021 local government elections), national communications director (2016), provincial media and communications manager (2016 to date).

== Early life, education and family ==
Grant was born in Camps Bay, a suburb on Cape Towns Atlantic coast, to parents Ron and Felicity. The family later moved to Wynberg in Cape Town's Southern suburbs where he was enrolled at Wynberg Boys Junior and High School, matriculating in 1986.

He has completed his B.A. Honours degree majoring international relations (political science) at the University of the Western Cape in 2010. In 2010 and 2011 he tutored and lectured at UWC.

== Early political career – 1998 to 2009 ==
Grant became a member of the African Christian Democratic Party (ACDP) in late 1998, serving as an unpaid volunteer at the party's Western Cape provincial office until the June 1999 national general elections. In July 1999, Grant was elected provincial secretary general at the Provincial General Conference, a position he held until the PGC in 2005 where he was elected provincial chair. He has also managed the ACDP's provincial elections campaigns for 2004, 2006, 2009 and 2011. In the December 2000 local government elections he was elected ACDP Councillor in the City of Cape Town and caucus leader. At the 2004 national general elections, Grant was elected to the Western Cape Provincial Parliament as a Member of Provincial Parliament.

As provincial chairman he played a key role for the party when it challenged the Independent Electoral Commission (IEC) in the Western Cape High Court, the Electoral Court and South Africa's Constitutional Court on their decision to exclude the ACDP from contesting the local government elections in Cape Town on 1 March 2006. After the party lost in the two lower courts, the matter ultimately went to the Constitutional Court where the party won just five days before Election Day, forcing the IEC to print new ballot papers and allowing the party just a few days to campaign.

Grant played another key role in the formation and success of South Africa's first multi-party government – in the City of Cape Town, after no party won a majority. The election results were that the Democratic Alliance won 90 seats and the African National Congress 81, but at least 106 seats were needed to form a government of the 210 seats in Council. Grant chaired the ACDP's negotiating team which first brought seven smaller parties together to form a king-maker block of 16 Councillors forming the "Multiparty Forum" that was chaired by the ACDP. This MPF block then agreed to work with the DA in a multi-party government (MPG), rather than with the African National Congress/Independent Democrat alliance. The MPG was elected with a majority of just one seat, an historic first for democratic South Africa, with the ACDP elected as Executive Deputy Mayor of Cape Town, Mayoral Committee member for parks, amenities and sport and to two subcouncil chair posts.

The MPG survived until January 2007 when the DA mayor expelled the African Muslim Party for colluding with the ANC behind the MPG's back. In so doing, the MPG lost its slim majority of one seat. That same day however, Grant convened an ACDP meeting resulting in the ACDP offering its post of executive deputy mayor to the Independent Democrats (ID) if they joined the MPG. This move brought stability to the MPG which now had a more comfortable majority of 122 out of 210 council seats.

In March 2007, the ACDP redeployed Grant to the City of Cape Town to take up the ACDP's seat on the Mayoral Committee as political head of Parks, Amenities and Sport.

After the 'walk-over window period' in September 2007 and the ensuing negotiation process with the DA on the ACDP's claim to regain the executive deputy mayor's seat, Grant was elected executive deputy mayor of Cape Town. until the 2009 elections. He served as acting executive mayor of Cape Town for a brief period after Mayor Helen Zille was elected premier-elect of the Western Cape. Their success also prompted the DA to ditch its coalition partners including the ACDP, who had helped them become the City government in the first place. During his term as executive deputy mayor of Cape Town, he was political head of the City's policies and programmes on, inter alia, substance abuse, street people, orphans and vulnerable children (OVC), and international relations, opening South Africa's first municipal-run Outpatient Treatment Centres for substance abuse, and another South African first being a municipal-run toll-free referral helpline for substance abuse. He also chaired the City's 2010 Steering Committee tasked with preparing Cape Town to be a Host City for the 2010 Fifa World Cup.

His term as executive deputy mayor ended abruptly on 27 May 2009 when the Democratic Alliance ended its 5-year contractual agreement with the ACDP prematurely, because they wished to have one of their own members holding his post so that they (quote) 'could be as effective as possible, politically'. But while this was their stated reason, they then attempted to blame the ACDP, citing 'breaches of trust', which was thoroughly refuted by the ACDP and withdrawing from coalition with the DA in all municipalities. Ultimately, the DA confirmed their axing of the ACDP was a political decision taken to ensure further DA growth.

== Political career – 2009 to 2020 ==
Grant remained a councillor in the City of Cape Town until the 18 May 2011 local government elections, where he was re-elected to the same post. The party also re-elected him as their caucus leader.

In April 2012 the ACDP redeployed him to the WC Provincial Parliament as Member of Provincial Parliament where he was elected Chair of SCOPA (Standing Committee on Public Accounts), a post he held until the 2014 national general elections when he returned to the City of Cape Town as councillor and caucusc leader.

During the December 2013 National General Conference he was elected Chair of the ACDP's national Federal Council (FCOP). As a result of holding this post he became an ex-officio member of the ACDP's National Executive Committee (NEC). He won re-election to this post at the National General Conference in late January 2019.

In July 2014 he was appointed the national elections manager for the 2016 local government elections, meaning a second NEC post. He was re-appointed to this post in January 2019 for the national general elections through to the 2021 local government elections.

Following the 2014 national general election he returned once more to the City of Cape Town as Councillor and caucus leader, a post he held until January 2016 when he resigned on request of the ACDP to take up a newly created and contracted national post being the Media and Communications Director until Octovber 2016 – his third concurrent NEC post at the time.

Following the 3 August 2016 local government elections, Grant was re-elected city councillor and caucus leader. In October that year he vacated two of the three NEC posts he held, retaining only his elected federal council chair post.

As at January 2020, Grant currently holds six posts: councillor and caucus leader in the City of Cape Town; national elections manager; federal council chair; media and communications manager and provincial whip – both for the Western Cape.
