= Deputy Mayor of Cape Town =

Deputy head of the local government of City of Cape Town, South Africa

- Incumbent; Eddie Andrews since 18 November 2021
- Appointer: Cape Town City Council
- Term length: Five years, no more than two terms
- Website: Official website

The Deputy Mayor of Cape Town is the deputy head of the local government of Cape Town, South Africa; currently that government takes the form of the City of Cape Town Metropolitan Municipality.

The Deputy Mayor of Cape Town is elected by the Cape Town City Council and serves alongside the Mayor of Cape Town. The Deputy Mayor has a term length five years and can be renewed once. The position holds many duties stated in the Municipal Structures Act, such as serving as acting Mayor of Cape Town and appointing an interim Mayoral Committee in the event of the Mayor's absence, resignation, death or removal.

The current Deputy Mayor is Eddie Andrews of the Democratic Alliance, who was elected to the role on 18 November 2021. He replaced Ian Neilson, who is also from the DA and was elected in 2009, succeeding Grant Haskin of the African Christian Democratic Party. He did not seek another term in 2021.

== Partial list of Deputy Mayors ==
- Frederick Smith (1912–1913)
- David Bloomberg (1971–1973)
- Sol Kreiner (1981–1983)
- Gordon Oliver (1987–1989)
- Clive Keegan (1991–1993)
- Llewellyn van Wyk (1993–1995)
- Theresa Solomon (1995–1996)
- Arthur Jacobs (1998?–1999?)
- Belinda Walker (2000–2001)
- Pierre Uys (2002–2004)
- Gawa Samuels (2004–2006)
- Andrew Arnolds (2006–2007)
- Charlotte Williams (2007–2007)
- Grant Haskin (2007–2009)
- Ian Neilson (2009–2021)
- Eddie Andrews (2021–present)
