= Executive Council of the Western Cape =

Provincial government in South Africa

The Executive Council of the Western Cape is the cabinet of the executive branch of the provincial government in the South African province of the Western Cape. The Members of the Executive Council (MECs) are appointed from among the members of the Western Cape Provincial Legislature by the Premier of the Western Cape, an office held since the 2019 general election by Alan Winde. The council is referred to as the Executive Council in the national Constitution, but is denoted the Provincial Cabinet of the Western Cape in the Western Cape Constitution.

== Rasool premiership: 2004–2008 ==
Following his election as Premier in the 2004 general election, Ebrahim Rasool announced his new Provincial Cabinet on 30 April 2004. On 26 July 2005, he announced a reshuffle affecting three portfolios, in which two new Provincial Ministers were appointed – one incumbent, Chris Stali, was fired, and another, Mcebisi Skwatsha, had resigned to take up the full-time position of Provincial Secretary of the African National Congress (ANC).

Western Cape Provincial Cabinet 2004–2008
Post	Member	Term	
Premier of the Western Cape	Ebrahim Rasool	2004	2008
Provincial Minister of Finance, Economic Development and Tourism	Lynne Brown	2004	2008
Provincial Minister of Health	Pierre Uys	2004	2008
Provincial Minister of Education	Cameron Dugmore	2004	2008
Provincial Minister of Public Works and Transport	Marius Fransman	2005	2008
Provincial Minister of Public Works and Transport	Mcebisi Skwatsha	2004	2005
Provincial Minister of Local Government and Housing	Richard Dyantyi	2005	2008
Provincial Minister of Local Government and Housing	Marius Fransman	2004	2005
Provincial Minister of Community Safety	Leonard Ramatlakane	2004	2008
Provincial Minister of Agriculture	Cobus Dowry	2004	2008
Provincial Minister of Environmental Affairs and Development Planning	Tasneem Essop	2004	2008
Provincial Minister of Social Services and Poverty Alleviation	Kholeka Mqulwana	2004	2008
Provincial Minister of Sports and Culture	Whitey Jacobs	2005	2008
Provincial Minister of Sports and Culture	Chris Stali	2004	2005

== Brown premiership: 2008–2009 ==
Lynne Brown was sworn in as Premier in July 2008 after the incumbent, Ebrahim Rasool, resigned at the request of the ANC, his political party. Later the same week, she announced a wide-ranging cabinet reshuffle in which four new provincial ministers were appointed and most others changed portfolios, leaving only one minister, Cobus Dowry, in his initial position. Brown fired two ministers who had been viewed as aligned to Rasool – Leonard Ramatlakane and Richard Dyantyi – and one of Rasool's other ministers, Tasneem Essop, had resigned in the aftermath of Rasool's own departure.

Western Cape Provincial Cabinet: 2008–2009
Post	Member	Term	
Premier of the Western Cape	Lynne Brown	2008	2009
Provincial Minister of Finance, Economic Development and Tourism	Garth Strachan	2008	2009
Provincial Minister of Health	Marius Fransman	2008	2009
Provincial Minister of Education	Yousuf Gabru	2008	2009
Provincial Minister of Transport and Public Works	Kholeka Mqulwana	2008	2009
Provincial Minister of Local Government and Housing	Whitey Jacobs	2008	2009
Provincial Minister of Community Safety	Patrick McKenzie	2008	2009
Provincial Minister of Agriculture	Cobus Dowry	2008	2009
Provincial Minister of Environmental Affairs and Development Planning	Pierre Uys	2008	2009
Provincial Minister of Social Development	Zodwa Magwaza	2008	2009
Provincial Minister of Sport and Cultural Affairs	Cameron Dugmore	2008	2009

== Zille premiership ==
=== First term: 2009–2014 ===
In May 2009, following her election in the 2009 general election, Premier Helen Zille announced her new Provincial Cabinet. In early September 2010, she announced her first reshuffle: only three portfolios were affected, but two ministers – Lennit Max and Sakkie Jenner – were fired from the cabinet. In the 2011 local government elections, Social Development Minister Patricia de Lille was elected Mayor of Cape Town; in a minor reshuffle on 29 May, Zille announced that de Lille would be replaced by Albert Fritz, who in turn would be replaced in the Community Safety portfolio by Dan Plato.

Western Cape Provincial Cabinet 2009–2014
Post	Member	Term		Party
Premier of the Western Cape	Helen Zille	2009	2014	DA
Provincial Minister of Finance, Economic Development and Tourism	Alan Winde	2009	2014	DA
Provincial Minister of Health	Theuns Botha	2009	2014	DA
Provincial Minister of Education	Donald Grant	2009	2014	DA
Provincial Minister of Transport and Public Works	Robin Carlisle	2009	2014	DA
Provincial Minister of Housing	Bonginkosi Madikizela	2009	2014	DA
Provincial Minister of Community Safety	Dan Plato	2011	2014	DA
Provincial Minister of Community Safety	Albert Fritz	2010	2011	DA
Provincial Minister of Community Safety	Lennit Max	2009	2010	DA
Provincial Minister of Agriculture	Gerrit van Rensburg	2009	2014	DA
Provincial Minister of Local Government, Environmental Affairs and Development Planning	Anton Bredell	2009	2014	DA
Provincial Minister of Social Development	Albert Fritz	2011	2014	DA
Provincial Minister of Social Development	Patricia de Lille	2010	2011	ID
Provincial Minister of Social Development	Ivan Meyer	2009	2010	DA
Provincial Minister of Cultural Affairs and Sport	Ivan Meyer	2010	2014	DA
Provincial Minister of Cultural Affairs and Sport	Sakkie Jenner	2009	2010	ID

=== Second term: 2014–2019 ===
After her re-election in the 2014 general election, Zille announced her new Provincial Cabinet, to be sworn in on 26 May 2014; she appointed two new MECs, Nomafrench Mbombo and Debbie Schäfer, who had not served in the cabinet during her first term. On 31 December 2014, Zille announced that Mbombo, who until then served as Provincial Minister of Cultural Affairs and Sport, would swap portfolios with Health Minister Theuns Botha, effective from 1 January 2015. Botha resigned from the Executive Council in April 2015 and was replaced by Anroux Marais. Finally, on 19 October 2018, Zille announced that Alan Winde would become Provincial Minister of Community Safety, replacing Dan Plato, who in turn would succeed former Minister Patricia de Lille as Mayor of Cape Town; Beverley Schäfer was appointed to the cabinet to replace Winde in the renamed Economic Opportunities portfolio.

Western Cape Provincial Cabinet 2014–2019
Post	Member	Term	
Premier of the Western Cape	Helen Zille	2014	2019
Provincial Minister of Finance	Ivan Meyer	2014	2019
Provincial Minister of Health	Nomafrench Mbombo	2014	2019
Provincial Minister of Health	Theuns Botha	2014	2015
Provincial Minister of Education	Debbie Schäfer	2014	2019
Provincial Minister of Economic Opportunities	Beverley Schäfer	2018	2019
Provincial Minister of Agriculture and Economic Development	Alan Winde	2014	2018
Provincial Minister of Transport and Public Works	Donald Grant	2014	2019
Provincial Minister of Human Settlements	Bonginkosi Madikizela	2014	2019
Provincial Minister of Community Safety	Alan Winde	2018	2019
Provincial Minister of Community Safety	Dan Plato	2014	2018
Provincial Minister of Local Government, Environmental Affairs and Development Planning	Anton Bredell	2014	2019
Provincial Minister of Social Development	Albert Fritz	2014	2019
Provincial Minister of Cultural Affairs and Sport	Anroux Marais	2015	2019
Provincial Minister of Cultural Affairs and Sport	Theuns Botha	2015	2015
Provincial Minister of Cultural Affairs and Sport	Nomafrench Mbombo	2014	2015

== Winde premiership: 2019–present ==
=== First term: 2019–2024 ===
On 23 May 2019, following his election in the 2019 general election, Premier Alan Winde announced his new cabinet. On 24 May 2021, he appointed Daylin Mitchell as Provincial Minister for Transport and Public Works after the former incumbent, Bonginkosi Madikizela, resigned amid a qualifications fraud scandal. In early 2022, two vacancies arose in the cabinet after Albert Fritz was fired from the Community Safety portfolio and Debbie Schäfer resigned from the Education portfolio. On 22 April that year, Winde announced a reshuffle that would fill the vacancies and create two newly reconfigured portfolios, Mobility and Infrastructure. In February 2023, Winde appointed Ricardo Mackenzie as the Minister of Mobility after Daylin Mitchell was elected speaker of the Western Cape Provincial Parliament.

Western Cape Provincial Cabinet 2019–2024
Post	Member	Term	
Premier of the Western Cape	Alan Winde	2019	2024
Provincial Minister of Finance and Economic Opportunities	Mireille Wenger	2022	2024
Provincial Minister of Finance and Economic Opportunities	David Maynier	2019	2022
Provincial Minister of Health	Nomafrench Mbombo	2019	2024
Provincial Minister of Education	David Maynier	2022	2024
Provincial Minister of Education	Debbie Schäfer	2019	2022
Provincial Minister of Mobility	Ricardo Mackenzie	2023	2024
Provincial Minister of Mobility	Daylin Mitchell	2022	2022
Provincial Minister of Transport and Public Works	Daylin Mitchell	2021	2022
Provincial Minister of Transport and Public Works	Bonginkosi Madikizela	2019	2021
Provincial Minister of Infrastructure	Tertius Simmers	2022	2024
Provincial Minister of Human Settlements	Tertius Simmers	2019	2022
Provincial Minister of Community Safety and Police Oversight	Reagan Allen	2022	2024
Provincial Minister of Community Safety	Albert Fritz	2019	2022
Provincial Minister of Agriculture	Ivan Meyer	2019	2024
Provincial Minister of Local Government, Environmental Affairs and Development Planning	Anton Bredell	2019	2024
Provincial Minister of Social Development	Sharna Fernandez	2019	2024
Provincial Minister of Cultural Affairs and Sport	Anroux Marais	2019	2024

=== Second term ===
On 13 June 2024, Winde was re-elected for his second term as premier following the 2024 provincial election. He appointed his new provincial cabinet shortly afterwards. On 20 August 2026, Winde announced a reshuffle of his provincial cabinet following David Maynier's departure as the Provincial Minister of Education to serve in the national government. Winde moved Jaco Londt from the Social Development portfolio to the Education portfolio, while Wendy Kaizer-Philander was appointed Provincial Minister of Social Development.

Western Cape Provincial Cabinet: 2024–present
Post	Member	Term	
Premier of the Western Cape	Alan Winde	2024	Incumbent
Provincial Minister of Agriculture, Economic Development and Tourism	Ivan Meyer	2024	Incumbent
Provincial Minister of Health and Wellness	Mireille Wenger	2024	Incumbent
Provincial Minister of Education	Jaco Londt	2026	Incumbent
Provincial Minister of Education	David Maynier	2024	2026
Provincial Minister of Infrastructure	Tertuis Simmers	2024	Incumbent
Provincial Minister of Local Government, Environmental Affairs, and Development Planning	Anton Bredell	2024	Incumbent
Provincial Minister of Community Safety and Police Oversight	Anroux Marais	2024	Incumbent
Provincial Minister of Mobility	Isaac Sileku	2024	Incumbent
Provincial Minister of Finance	Deidré Baartman	2024	Incumbent
Provincial Minister of Social Development	Wendy Kaizer-Philander	2026	Incumbent
Provincial Minister of Social Development	Jaco Londt	2024	2026
Provincial Minister of Sport and Cultural Affairs	Ricardo Mackenzie	2024	Incumbent
