= List of members of the 6th Western Cape Provincial Parliament =

This is a list of the current members of the sixth Western Cape Provincial Parliament.

Name	Parliamentary group	Start	End
Reagen Allen	Democratic Alliance	2019-05-22	
Daylin Mitchell	Democratic Alliance	2019-05-22	
Andile Lili	African National Congress	2019-05-22	
Petrus Marais	Freedom Front Plus	2019-05-22	
David Maynier	Democratic Alliance	2019-05-22	
Muhammad Khalid Sayed	African National Congress	2019-05-22	
Danville Smith	African National Congress	2019-05-22	
Rachel Windvogel	African National Congress	2019-05-22	
Masizole Mnqasela	Democratic Alliance	2019-05-22	
Derrick America	Democratic Alliance	2019-05-22	
Gillion Bosman	Democratic Alliance	2019-05-22	
Izgak De Jager	Al Jama-ah	2019-05-22	Unknown
Galil Brinkhuis	Al Jama-ah	2019-10-24	
Ricardo Mackenzie	Democratic Alliance	2019-05-22	
Anroux Marais	Democratic Alliance	2019-05-22	
Nomafrench Mbombo	Democratic Alliance	2019-05-22	
Lulama Mvimbi	African National Congress	2019-05-22	
Beverley Schäfer	Democratic Alliance	2019-05-22	
Andricus van der Westhuizen	Democratic Alliance	2019-05-22	
Deidré Baartman	Democratic Alliance	2019-05-22	
Lorraine Botha	Democratic Alliance	2019-05-22	
Cameron Dugmore	African National Congress	2019-05-22	
Mesuli Kama	African National Congress	2019-05-22	
Bonginkosi Madikizela	Democratic Alliance	2019-05-22	
Patrick Marran	African National Congress	2019-05-22	
Ivan Meyer	Democratic Alliance	2019-05-22	
Nobulumko Nkondlo	African National Congress	2019-05-22	
Debbie Schäfer	Democratic Alliance	2019-05-22	
Mireille Wenger	Democratic Alliance	2019-05-22	
Ntombezanele Bakubaku-Vos	African National Congress	2019-05-22	
Sharna Fernandez	Democratic Alliance	2019-05-22	
Anton Bredell	Democratic Alliance	2019-05-22	
Pat Lekker	African National Congress	2019-05-22	
Matlhodi Maseko	Democratic Alliance	2019-05-22	
Wendy Philander	Democratic Alliance	2019-05-22	
Tertuis Simmers	Democratic Alliance	2019-05-22	
Alan Winde	Democratic Alliance	2019-05-22	
Albert Fritz	Democratic Alliance	2019-05-22	
Ferlon Christians	African Christian Democratic Party	2019-05-22	
Ayanda Bans	African National Congress	2019-05-23	
Aishah Cassiem	Economic Freedom Fighters	2023-02-03	
Thembile Klaas	Economic Freedom Fighters	2023-02-03	
Peter De Villiers	Good	2023-05-23	

== See also ==
- List of members of the 5th Western Cape Provincial Parliament
