= List of members of the 5th Western Cape Provincial Parliament =

This is a list of the members of the fifth Western Cape Provincial Parliament.

Name	Parliamentary group	Position
Albert Fritz	Democratic Alliance	Provincial Minister of Social Development
Bonginkosi Madikizela	Democratic Alliance	Provincial Minister of Human Settlements
Alan Winde	Democratic Alliance	Provincial Minister for Community Safety
Beverley Schäfer	Democratic Alliance	Provincial Minister of Economic Opportunities
Ivan Meyer	Democratic Alliance	Provincial Minister of Finance
Debbie Schäfer	Democratic Alliance	Provincial Minister of Education
Anton Bredell	Democratic Alliance	Provincial Minister of Local Government, Environment Affairs and Development Planning
Donald Grant	Democratic Alliance	Provincial Minister of Transport and Public Works
Nomafrench Mbombo	Democratic Alliance	Provincial Minister of Health
Anroux Marais	Democratic Alliance	Provincial Minister of Cultural Affairs and Sport
Helen Zille	Democratic Alliance	Premier
Denis Joseph	Democratic Alliance	Deputy Chief Whip of the Majority Party
Masizole Mnqasela	Democratic Alliance	Member
Richard Dyantyi	African National Congress	Member
Cameron Dugmore	African National Congress	Member
Piet Pretorius	Democratic Alliance	Deputy Speaker
Sharna Fernandez	Democratic Alliance	Speaker
Lorraine Botha	Democratic Alliance	Member
Bernard Daniel Joseph	Economic Freedom Fighters	Member
Carol Beerwinkel	African National Congress	Member
Reagen Allen	Democratic Alliance	Member
Trudy Dijana	African National Congress	Member
Maurencia Gillion	African National Congress	Member
Ferlon Christians	African Christian Democratic Party	Member
Sharon Davids	African National Congress	Member
Nceba Hinana	Democratic Alliance	Whip
Dorothea Gopie	African National Congress	Member
Basil Kivedo	Democratic Alliance	Member
Pat Lekker	African National Congress	Member
Pholisa Makeleni	African National Congress	Member
Ricardo Mackenzie	Democratic Alliance	Member
Khaya Magaxa	African National Congress	Leader of the Opposition
Daylin Mitchell	Democratic Alliance	Member
Nobulumko Nkondlo	African National Congress	Member
Matlhodi Maseko	Democratic Alliance	Member
Tertuis Simmers	Democratic Alliance	Member
Wendy Philander	Democratic Alliance	Member
Mireille Wenger	Democratic Alliance	Member
Siyazi Tyatyam	African National Congress	Whip
Mark Wiley	Democratic Alliance	Chief Whip of the Majority Party
Theo Olivier	African National Congress	Member
Pierré Uys	African National Congress	Chief Whip of the Official Opposition

== See also ==
- List of members of the 4th Western Cape Provincial Parliament
