= Patrick McKenzie =

South African politician (born 1952)

Member of the Western Cape Executive Council for Community Safety
- In office July 2008 – May 2009
- Premier: Lynne Brown
- Preceded by: Leonard Ramatlakane
- Succeeded by: Lennit Max

Personal details
- Born: Patrick Cecil McKenzie; 8 December 1952 (age 73)
- Citizenship: South Africa
- Party: African National Congress (since 1999)
- Other political affiliations: New National Party) (1997–1999); National Party (1994–1997); Labour Party (until 1994)

Patrick Cecil McKenzie (born 8 December 1952) is a South African politician who represented the African National Congress (ANC) in the Western Cape Provincial Parliament until his retirement in November 2012, holding several positions in the Western Cape Executive Council during that time. Between 1994 and 1999, before he joined the ANC, he represented the National Party, including for a brief period as Minister of Welfare and Population Development in Nelson Mandela's Government of National Unity in 1996. Before that, he represented the Labour Party in the Tricameral Parliament from 1983 to 1994.

== Early life and political career ==
McKenzie was born on 8 December 1952. He is Coloured and when he was eight, his family was forcibly removed from Cape Town's District Six under the apartheid-era Group Areas Act. He flirted with the Congress-aligned anti-apartheid movement but disapproved of the use of violence in the movement.

He worked in management in the Cape Town City Council from 1977 and in 1983 he was elected to the Coloured chamber of the newly established Tricameral Parliament, representing the Labour Party in the Bonteheuwel constituency. He remained in his seat until the abolition of apartheid, and therefore of the Tricameral Parliament, in 1994.

== Democratic government: 1994–2012 ==
=== National Party: 1994–1999 ===
In South Africa's first post-apartheid elections in 1994, McKenzie was elected to the Western Cape Provincial Parliament, where he ultimately served in a variety of portfolios in the Western Cape Executive Council. In the legislature, he represented the National Party (NP), which had governed South Africa under apartheid. Explaining his new party affiliation, McKenzie highlighted concerns about future economic misgovernance by the governing African National Congress (ANC):

We're [as Coloureds] sort of caught between the devil and the deep blue sea. It's a bit confusing to be with the party of the old oppressors instead of the party of the liberators, but most of us are going to vote with our heads, not our hearts.

He left the provincial parliament for a brief period between March and June 1996, when he was sworn into the National Assembly to serve as national Minister of Welfare and Population Development in Nelson Mandela's multi-party Government of National Unity; he left the ministry on 30 June 1996, when the NP withdrew from the cabinet entirely, but remained in his legislative seat. By 1999 he had returned to the Western Cape Provincial Parliament.

=== African National Congress: 1999–2012 ===
In January 1999, ahead of the 1999 general election, the Mail & Guardian reported that McKenzie was in talks about leaving the NP (by then restyled as the New National Party) for the ANC on the grounds that he had "reached a 'glass ceiling'" in his current party. He did indeed defect to the ANC and in the 1999 election, he was returned to the Western Cape Provincial Parliament on the ANC's party list.

He was re-elected in 2004 and took up his final posting in the Executive Council in July 2008, when Premier Lynne Brown named him as Member of the Executive Council (MEC) for Community Safety. He left the Executive Council after the 2009 general election, when the ANC lost control of the provincial parliament. However, he remained in his seat as an ordinary Member of the Provincial Legislature and he was serving as the ANC's spokesperson on community safety when he announced his retirement, effective at the end of November 2012.

== Personal life ==
He is married to Carol McKenzie, who represented the ANC in local politics and with whom he has several children. His son Angus is also a local politician in Cape Town and is a member of the Democratic Alliance.
