= Jaco Londt =

South African politician (born 1984)

Jaco Londt MPP
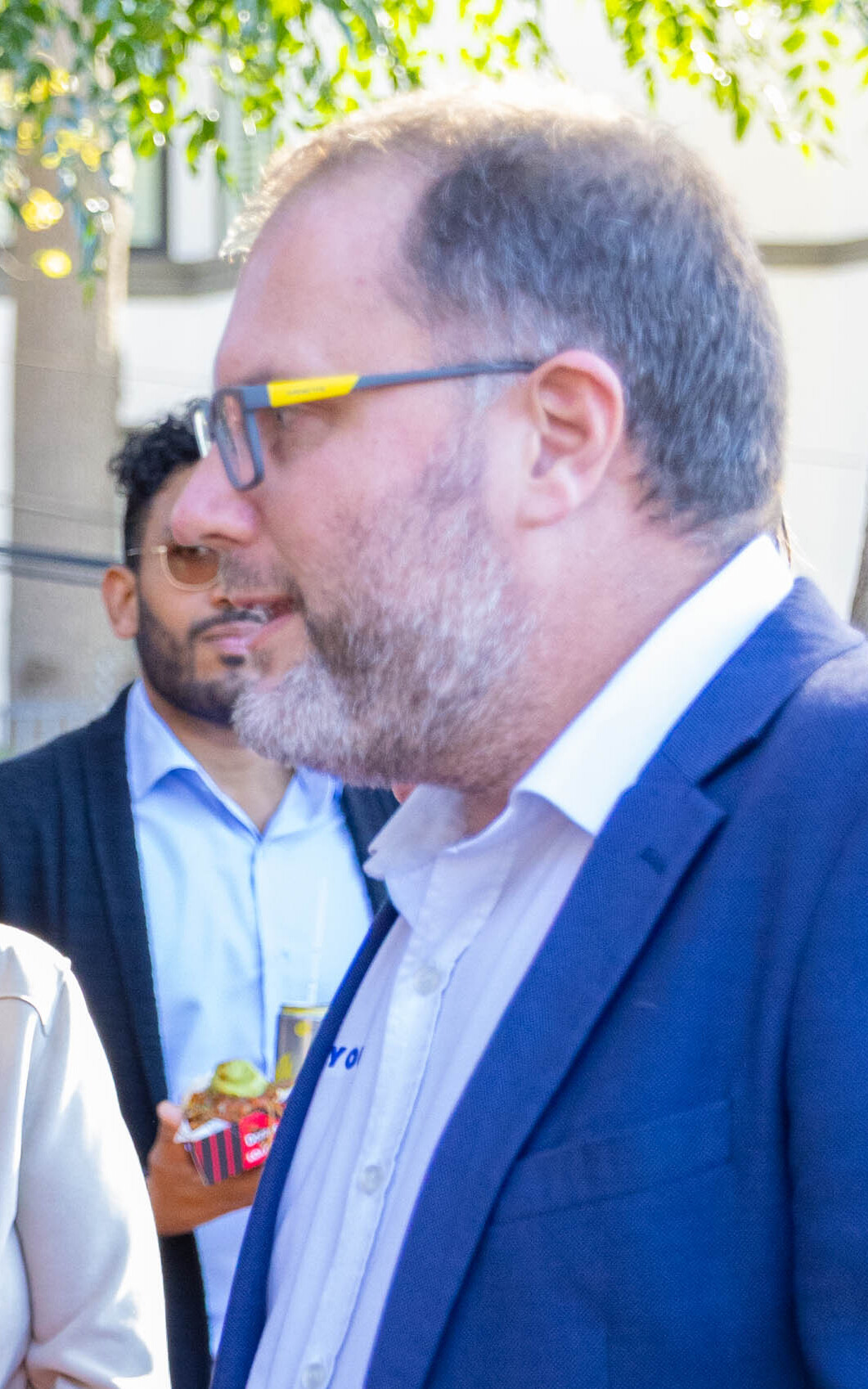
- Londt in 2025

Western Cape Provincial Minister of Education
- Incumbent
- Assumed office 20 August 2026
- Premier: Alan Winde
- Preceded by: David Maynier

Western Cape Provincial Minister of Social Development
- In office 13 June 2024 – 20 August 2026
- Premier: Alan Winde
- Preceded by: Sharna Fernandez
- Succeeded by: Wendy Kaizer-Philander

Member of the Western Cape Provincial Parliament
- Incumbent
- Assumed office 13 June 2024

Permanent delegate to the National Council of Provinces from the Western Cape
- In office 23 May 2019 – 28 May 2024
- In office 22 May 2014 – 7 September 2018

Member of the National Assembly of South Africa
- In office 7 September 2018 – 7 May 2019

Personal details
- Born: Johan Jaco Londt; 27 November 1984 (age 41) Oudtshoorn, Cape Province, South Africa
- Party: Democratic Alliance
- Spouse(s): Dorcas Dube Londt; Lize Londt (divorced)
- Education: University of South Africa (BA); Stellenbosch University (BPAHons)
- Profession: Politician

Johan Jaco Londt (born 27 November 1984) is a South African politician who has been the Western Cape's Provincial Minister of Education since August 2026 and a Member of the Western Cape Provincial Parliament since June 2024. He previously served as the Provincial Minister of Social Development between 2024 and 2026. Prior to serving in the provincial parliament, he was a Permanent Delegate to the National Council of Provinces between May 2014 and September 2018 and again from May 2019 until May 2024. Between September 2018 and May 2019, he served as a member of the National Assembly. Londt is a member of the Democratic Alliance (DA), of which he serves as the party's provincial chairperson in the Western Cape. He was chairperson of the party's east region in the Western Cape from 2015 to 2020.

== Early life and education ==
Londt was born on 27 November 1984 in Oudtshoorn in the former Cape Province. His parents were farmers. He first studied mathematics at the University of Pretoria, before changing it to psychology. In 2006, he was employed as a media officer at the Mpumalanga Provincial Legislature. Londt was appointed the provincial director of the Democratic Alliance in 2008. Londt holds a bachelor's degree in Humanities from the University of South Africa. In March 2026, he graduated from Stellenbosch University with an honours degree in public administration.

== Political career ==
Londt was elected to parliament following the 2014 general election that was held on 7 May. He was appointed as one of the Western Cape's delegates in the National Council of Provinces and took office on 22 May. He was elected chairperson of the DA's East Region of the Western Cape in 2015. Londt was re-elected for a second term as chair in 2017. On 7 September 2018, Londt was appointed to the National Assembly. He served in the chamber for only eight months before being appointed back to the NCOP after the general election held on 8 May 2019. He took office on 23 May 2019.

In 2020, Londt stood down as regional chairperson and Tertuis Simmers was elected to succeed him. Londt subsequently declared that he was a candidate to replace Anton Bredell as the DA provincial chairperson. He was elected at the party's virtual provincial congress on 21 November 2020. He was re-elected unopposed as provincial chairperson of the DA at the party's provincial congress in November 2023.

Londt was elected to the Western Cape Provincial Parliament in the 2024 provincial election. He was then appointed as the Provincial Minister of Social Development by premier Alan Winde.

On 20 August 2026, Winde moved him to the Education portfolio of the Provincial Cabinet following David Maynier's departure to serve in the national government.

== Personal life ==
Londt used to be married to Lize Londt. He is now married to Dorcas Dube Londt, who serves as a National Marketing and Communications Manager for an NGO.
