= Albert Fritz =

South African politician

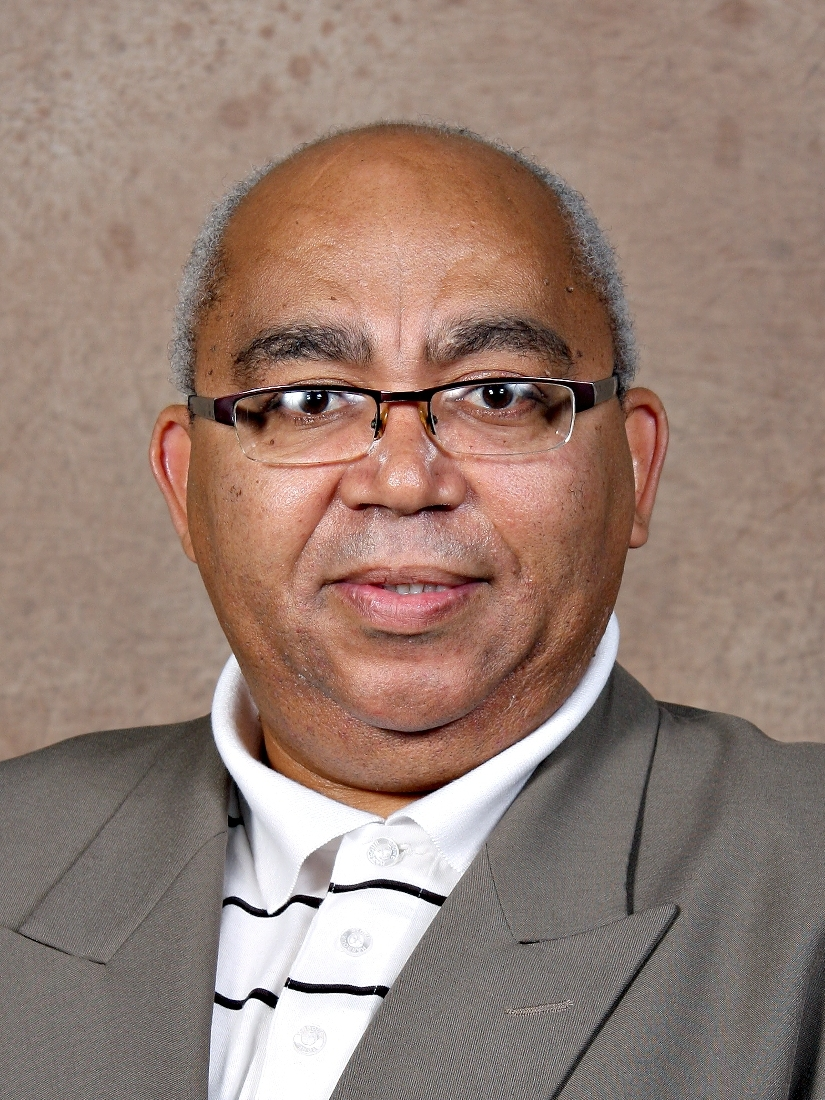

Interim Leader of the Democratic Alliance in the Western Cape
- In office 21 May 2021 – 1 March 2022; On leave: 24 January 2022 – 1 March 2022; Acting: 16 April 2021 – 21 May 2021
- Deputy: Tertuis Simmers (interim)
- Preceded by: Bonginkosi Madikizela
- Succeeded by: Tertuis Simmers

Western Cape Provincial Minister of Community Safety
- In office 23 May 2019 – 1 March 2022
- Premier: Alan Winde
- Preceded by: Alan Winde
- Succeeded by: Reagen Allen
- In office 13 September 2010 – 31 May 2011
- Premier: Helen Zille
- Preceded by: Lennit Max
- Succeeded by: Dan Plato

Western Cape Provincial Minister of Social Development
- In office 1 June 2011 – 22 May 2019
- Premier: Helen Zille
- Preceded by: Patricia de Lille
- Succeeded by: Sharna Fernandez

Deputy Provincial Leader of the Western Cape Democratic Alliance
- In office 7 October 2017 – 21 May 2021
- Leader: Bonginkosi Madikizela
- Preceded by: Bonginkosi Madikizela
- Succeeded by: Tertuis Simmers (interim)

Member of the Western Cape Provincial Parliament
- In office 13 September 2010 – 1 March 2022
- Constituency: City of Cape Town

Member of the National Assembly
- In office 6 May 2009 – 10 September 2010
- Constituency: Western Cape

Personal details
- Born: 1 July 1959 (age 67) Woodstock, Cape Town, Cape Province, Union of South Africa
- Party: Democratic Alliance (2008–2022)
- Other political affiliations: African National Congress (1990–2008)
- Spouse: Dianne Fritz
- Children: 1 son
- Education: University of Western Cape
- Profession: Advocate; Politician

Albert Theo Fritz (born 1 July 1959) is a South African politician and advocate. He was the Western Cape Provincial Minister of Community Safety for two nonconconsecutive terms from 2010 to 2011 and again from 2019 until his dismissal from the position amid sexual misconduct allegations in 2022. He was a Member of the Western Cape Provincial Parliament from 2010 until his resignation from the DA in 2022. He served as the interim Leader of the Democratic Alliance (DA) in the Western Cape from the suspension and resignation of Bonginkosi Madikizela in April 2021 until his resignation from the party in March 2022. He was also the deputy DA provincial leader 2017 to 2021. Fritz previously served as the Western Cape Provincial Minister of Social Development from 2011 to 2019. From 2009 to 2010, he was a Member of the National Assembly and the Shadow Deputy Minister of Correctional Services.

In January 2022, Fritz was suspended as Community Safety Minister over serious sexual assault allegations. He also stepped aside as the interim DA provincial leader. On 1 March 2022, premier Alan Winde fired him as Community Safety Minister after an independent report found sufficient evidence of sexual misconduct by Fritz. He resigned from the DA on that same day.

== Early years and education ==
One of six children, Fritz was born in Woodstock, a suburb of Cape Town. He and his family later moved to District Six and were forcibly evicted in 1972 due to the Group Areas Act. They relocated to Hanover Park on the Cape Flats. He was expelled from Oaklands High School in 1976, because of his involvement in an anti-apartheid uprising. At the University of the Western Cape, he achieved a BA Honours degree in Social Science and also an LLB. He soon enrolled for a master's degree in Social Sciences from the same university.

== Anti-apartheid activities and early career ==
Fritz arranged several school boycotts during the 1970s and 1980s. He became involved in various movements such as the Hanover Park Youth Movement and the Hanover Park Civic Association. He was a member of the Cape Housing Action Committee.

During the 1980s, he was appointed an organiser for the Media Workers' Association of South Africa. Fritz also joined the United Democratic Front. He joined the African National Congress's Strandfontein branch in 1990, but soon moved to the party's Milnerton branch in 1996. He was employed by the office of the Inspecting Judge in 1999. He was promoted to the post of Chief Judicial Inspector of Prisons in South Africa in 2002. In 2014, Fritz was admitted to the Western Cape High Court as an advocate.

In 2008, Fritz announced that he was leaving the African National Congress. He subsequently joined the Democratic Alliance.

== Political career ==
On 6 May 2009, Fritz took office as a Member of the National Assembly. Shortly afterwards, the Democratic Alliance Parliamentary Leader Athol Trollip appointed Fritz to the position of Shadow Deputy Minister of Correctional Services, serving alongside James Selfe, who was reappointed as the Shadow Minister of Correctional Services.

In September 2010, Premier Helen Zille announced that Provincial Minister Lennit Max and Fritz would exchange positions. Max would become a Member of the National Assembly and Shadow Minister, while Fritz would become the Provincial Minister of Community Safety and a Member of the Western Cape Provincial Parliament. Fritz left Parliament on 10 September 2010.

Fritz took office as Provincial Minister of Community Safety on 13 September 2010. In May 2011, Zille appointed Fritz to the position of Provincial Minister of Social Development, succeeding Patricia de Lille. Fritz took office on 1 June 2011. Dan Plato succeeded him as the Provincial Minister of Community Safety.

On 7 October 2017, he was elected as the Deputy Provincial Leader of the Democratic Alliance, succeeding Bonginkosi Madikizela, at the party's provincial conference held at the Every Nation Church in Goodwood, Cape Town.

In May 2019, Fritz was appointed as the Provincial Minister of Community Safety by the newly elected Premier, Alan Winde. He was re-elected as deputy provincial leader in November 2020, defeating Tertuis Simmers.

On 16 April 2021, Fritz was appointed as the acting DA leader in the Western Cape after Madikizela had "voluntarily stepped aside" as provincial leader for two weeks amid a qualifications scandal. Madikizela resigned as provincial leader on 28 April. On 21 May 2021, Fritz was elected as interim provincial leader unopposed after DA MPP Wendy Philander withdrew her candidacy.

== Sexual assault allegations and dismissal ==
On 23 January 2022, Premier Winde suspended Fritz as the Provincial Minister for Community Safety after receiving "serious allegations" against him. The following day, 24 January 2022, News24 reported that Fritz was allegedly suspended over sexual assault allegations but neither Winde nor his office confirmed this at the time. Fritz also requested to step down as the interim provincial leader of the DA in the Western Cape until the completion of the investigation into the allegations made against him, which the DA accepted. Deputy interim provincial leader Tertuis Simmers was the acting provincial leader for the time being. Winde appointed the Provincial Minister for Cultural Affairs and Sport Anroux Marais to act as Minister for Community Safety while the allegations against Fritz were investigated.

On 26 January 2022, Advocate Jennifer Williams was appointed to investigate the sexual assault allegations against Fritz. The South African Police Service announced on 27 January that they had opened an inquiry into allegations against Fritz. The chairperson of Parliament's Portfolio Committee on Employment and Labour Mary-Ann Dunjwa condemned Fritz's alleged sexual misconduct. Winde confirmed on 30 January that Fritz was suspended over "serious sexual assault allegations" after he previously did not specify why Fritz was suspended.

Fritz and four other provincial government officials, who have also been suspended, allegedly targeted young women to harass them sexually. The Sunday Times reported that Fritz sent late-night WhatsApp messages to young women asking them to come to his room during government trips and DA party activities.

On 1 March 2022, Winde fired Fritz as Community Safety Provincial Minister after an independent report found sufficient evidence of sexual misconduct. Winde said on Fritz's axing: "Having gone through this report carefully, it is clear to me that Mr Fritz is not a fit and proper person to hold any position in my executive council." Fritz resigned as a DA member later that day after the party gave him 24 hours to explain why he should not be suspended from the provincial caucus and party activities. Fritz has denied the allegations, calling it an 'anonymous and protected political smear'. Interim deputy provincial leader Tertuis Simmers replaced him as interim provincial leader, while Reagen Allen took over as Provincial Minister of Community Safety.

== Personal life ==
He is married to Dianne Veldsman. They have one son named Charlton. Fritz refers to his mother, Theodora, as his "rock".

On 27 November 2020, Fritz tested positive for COVID-19.

Political offices
Preceded by Alan Winde	Western Cape Provincial Minister of Community Safety; 2019–2022	Succeeded by Reagen Allen
Preceded by Patricia de Lille	Western Cape Provincial Minister of Social Development; 2011–2019	Succeeded by Sharna Fernandez
Preceded by Lennit Max	Western Cape Provincial Minister of Community Safety; 2010–2011	Succeeded by Dan Plato
Party political offices
Preceded by Bonginkosi Madikizela	Deputy Provincial Leader of the Western Cape Democratic Alliance; 2017–2021	Succeeded by Tertuis Simmers
