= Marius Fransman =

Retired South African politician and teacher

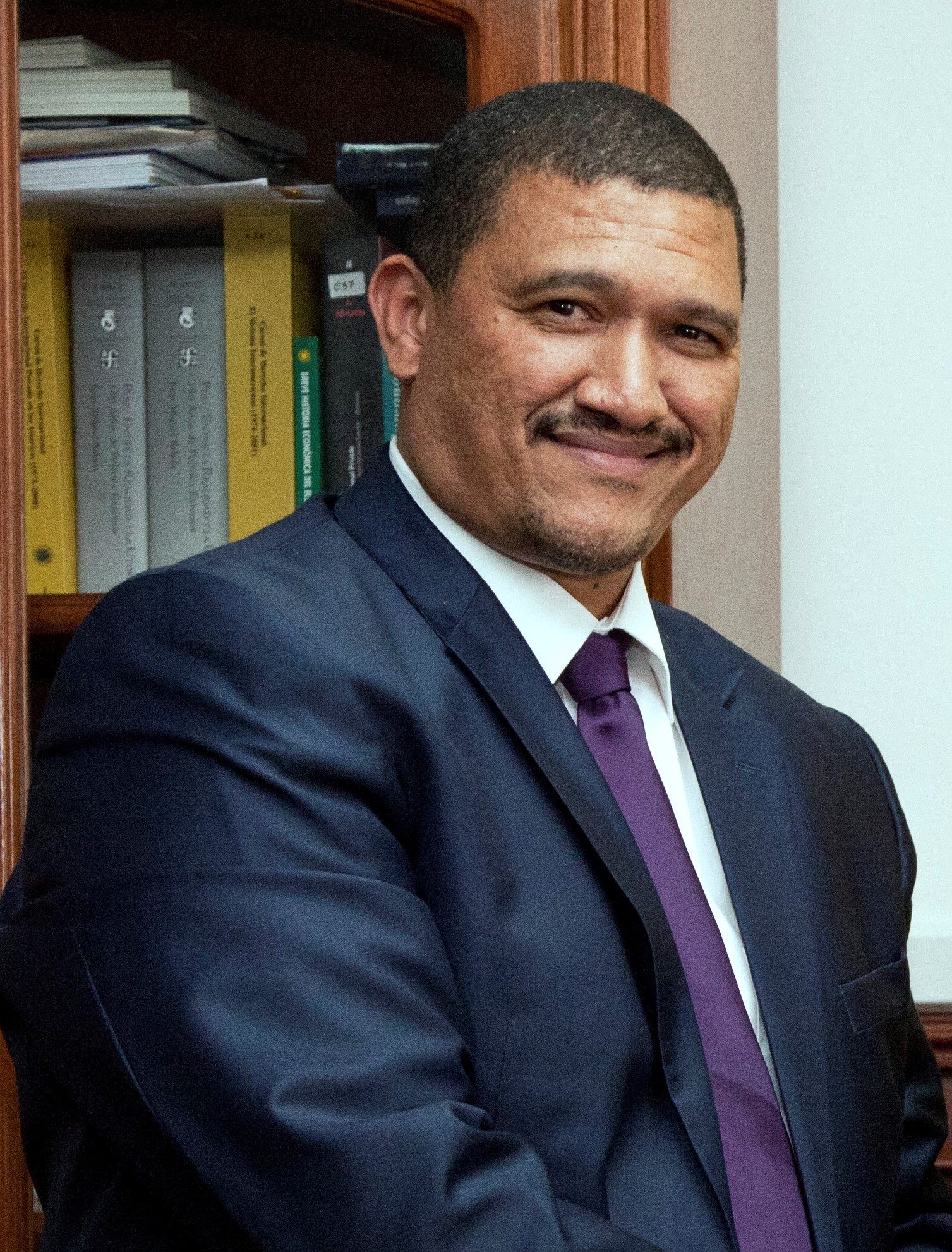

Leader of the Opposition in the Western Cape Provincial Parliament
- In office 21 May 2014 – 16 February 2016
- Premier: Helen Zille
- Preceded by: Lynne Brown
- Succeeded by: Khaya Magaxa

Provincial Chairperson of the Western Cape African National Congress
- In office 12 February 2011 – February 2016
- Preceded by: Mcebisi Skwatsha
- Succeeded by: Khaya Magaxa

Deputy Minister of International Relations and Cooperation
- In office 2 November 2010 – 25 May 2014
- President: Jacob Zuma
- Preceded by: Sue van der Merwe
- Succeeded by: Luwellyn Landers

Member of the National Assembly
- In office 6 May 2009 – 6 May 2014
- Constituency: Western Cape
Western Cape government positions
Western Cape Provincial Minister of Health
In office 1 August 2008 – 6 May 2009
Premier	Lynne Brown
Preceded by	Pierré Uys
Succeeded by	Theuns Botha
Western Cape Provincial Minister of Transport and Public Works
In office 26 July 2005 – 1 August 2008
Premier	Ebrahim Rasool
Preceded by	Mcebisi Skwatsha
Succeeded by	Kholeka Mqulwana
Western Cape Provincial Minister of Local Government and Housing
In office 30 April 2004 – 26 July 2005
Premier	Ebrahim Rasool
Preceded by	Pierré Uys
Succeeded by	Richard Dyantyi
Western Cape Provincial Minister of Social Services and Poverty Alleviation
In office 5 December 2001 – 30 April 2004
Premier	Leonard Ramatlakane (acting); Marthinus van Schalkwyk; Piet Meyer (acting); Peter Marais
Preceded by	Peter Marais
Succeeded by	Kholeka Mqulwana

Member of the Western Cape Provincial Parliament
- In office 21 May 2014 – 16 September 2016
- Constituency: City of Cape Town
- In office 15 June 1999 – 6 May 2009
- Constituency: City of Cape Town

Personal details
- Born: 15 August 1969 (age 57) Blackheath, Cape Flats, Cape Town, South Africa
- Party: African National Congress (until 2016)
- Spouse: Philida Fransman
- Children: 2
- Education: University of the Western Cape
- Profession: Teacher; Politician

Marius Llewellyn Fransman (born 15 August 1969) is a South African politician and teacher. He served as Leader of the Opposition in the Western Cape Provincial Parliament from 2014 to 2016, and as Chairperson of the Western Cape African National Congress from 2011 to 2016. He served as Deputy Minister of International Relations and Cooperation in the cabinet of Jacob Zuma. From 2009 to 2014, he was a Member of the National Assembly. Fransman served as a Member of the Western Cape Provincial Parliament from 1999 to 2009, and again from 2014 to 2016.

== Early life and career ==
Fransman was born on 15 August 1969 in Blackheath on the Cape Flats. He served as head boy of Bishop Lavis Secondary School and matriculated in 1987. He played a crucial role in creating awareness while he served as the chairperson of the school's student representative council (SRC). He obtained a Bachelor of Arts degree from the University of Western Cape. Later on, he achieved a Higher Diploma in Education from the same university.

After completing his studies at university, he worked as a teacher in the town of Vredendal. In that same period, he joined the African National Congress.

== Political career ==
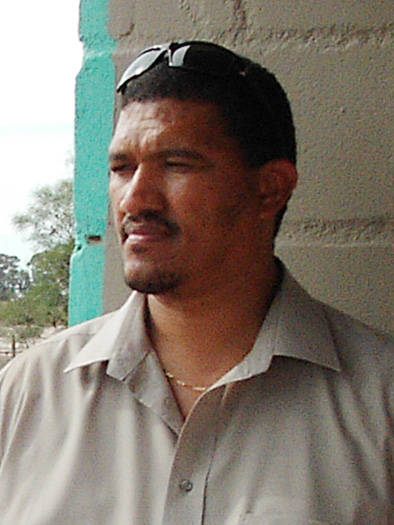
Fransman campaigning for a by-election candidate in 2007

He worked as a regional recruiter for the ANC and later took up the position of Farm Dweller Project Manager at Surplus People's Project. He served as Provincial Deputy Secretary of the Western Cape African National Congress branch from 1997 until 2004, while he concurrently worked as head of the fishing desk. He was the party's rural elections co-ordinator from 1995 until he became the party's provincial elections coordinator in 1999.

Despite holding many internal party positions, he served as Deputy Mayor and Mayor of the Vredendal Municipality. He was elected to the Western Cape Provincial Parliament in 1999 and held many positions in the Western Cape provincial government. He was named Provincial Minister of Social Services and Poverty Alleviation in 2001 but was then deployed to the position of Provincial Minister of Local Government and Housing in 2004. In 2005, Rasool reshuffled his executive and designated Fransman as Provincial Minister of Transport and Public Works. He served until 2008 when Premier Lynne Brown announced that Fransman would become Provincial Minister of Health.

In May 2009, he was elected to the National Assembly and served as Parliamentary Chairperson of the Higher Education and Training Committee. President Jacob Zuma reconfigured the national cabinet in October 2010 and named Fransman as Deputy Minister of International Relations and Cooperation, succeeding Sue van der Merwe.

== Chairperson of the Western Cape African National Congress ==
Fransman was a candidate for the post of Chairperson of the Western Cape African National Congress. The incumbent, Mcebisi Skwatsha, decided to stand down. Fransman was unanimously elected chairperson on 12 February 2011 at the party's conference in Cape Town.

As Chairperson of the African National Congress in the Democratic Alliance-led Western Cape, Fransman came under fire on several occasions before the 2014 general election for his controversial canvassing methods. The methods included distributing food parcels to potential voters and promising large sums of cash to Coloured voters before the election. Fransman was the party's premier candidate. The party retained all its seats in the Western Cape Provincial Parliament and he returned to the Western Cape Provincial Parliament as Leader of the Opposition, succeeding Lynne Brown. He challenged incumbent Helen Zille of the Democratic Alliance for the position of Premier at the first sitting of the Fifth Provincial Parliament. He subsequently lost to Zille as the Democratic Alliance held a majority in the Provincial Parliament. Fransman received 14 votes compared Zille's 27 votes.

Fransman had also challenged and criticised the Western Cape Government and the Democratic Alliance on its policy positions. Fransman won re-election unopposed to a second term at the party's conference in 2015.

=== Sexual harassment allegations ===
Fransman was accused of sexual assault by his assistant, Louisa Wynand. Fransman was alleged to have sexually assaulted Wynand while en route to the African National Congress's 104th birthday celebrations in Rustenburg in January 2016. Fransman strongly denied these claims. The Democratic Alliance, as well as party officials from the African National Congress, called for him to step down. The party quickly suspended Fransman as chairperson pending an investigation into the alleged assault claims. Deputy Chairperson, Khaya Magaxa, was designated as Fransman's acting successor. On 16 February 2016, it was announced that Magaxa would succeed Fransman as Leader of the Opposition in the Western Cape Provincial Parliament. The ANC said that Magaxa would replace Fransman until all the internal processes had been completed.

Fransman had received quite a lot of support during this period. In February 2016, a Facebook page was created with the name, Friends of Marius Fransman. On the page, a prayer service was organised for the Fransman family. The service was later held in Vredendal. In April 2016, the secretary of the provincial ANC Youth League called for the reinstatement of Fransman.

In May 2016, the National Prosecuting Authority announced that the charges against Fransman had been dropped due to a lack of evidence. The African National Congress continued with its own party investigation.

In June 2016, the African National Congress Women's League stated that the organisation would not support Fransman, as well as his accuser.

In July 2016, an ANC official claimed that Fransman had returned to his position. ANC Secretary-General, Gwede Mantashe, criticised the party official who made the false announcement. Fransman brought forward a court application to get reinstated as chairperson.

In August 2016, the African National Congress's support in the Western Cape significantly decreased. The party lost many wards and municipalities to the Democratic Alliance.

=== Resignation and suspension ===
In September 2016, Fransman resigned as a Member of the Western Cape Provincial Parliament, yet he did not step down from the position of provincial chairperson.

In November 2016, the National Disciplinary Committee of the African National Congress found Fransman guilty on two counts of misconduct and suspended his party membership for five years, consequently removing him as chairperson of the provincial branch.

== Post-suspension ==
In March 2017, Fransman threw his support behind chairperson of Nelson Mandela Bay African National Congress branch, Andile Lunigsa, as senior ANC party officials called for Lungisa's resignation.

Fransman, who is an avid supporter of Jacob Zuma, also announced in March 2017, that he is elated that Zuma reshuffled his cabinet and praised the appointments of the new ministers. He challenged the disgruntled ministers and MPs to resign their respective posts.

In September 2018, the South African Jewish Board of Deputies made public statements, in which they stated that Fransman had not yet apologised for the defamatory comments he made in 2013.

In December 2018, the National Prosecuting Authority announced that sexual assault claims made by Fransman's accuser, Louisa Wynand, would be investigated.

The sexual assault charges against Fransman were officially dropped in September 2019, after the two parties came to an agreement to settle out of court. The ANC responded with the lifting of Fransman's suspension as a party member. Interim ANC Western Cape Chair, Lerumo Kalako, has said that Fransman is welcome to become a member of the party again.

== People's Movement for Change ==
In November 2023, Fransman launched a new political party, the People's Movement for Change.

== Personal life ==
On 31 March 2020, Fransman announced that he had tested positive for COVID-19.

Political offices
Preceded by Lynne Brown	Leader of the Opposition in the Western Cape Provincial Parliament; 2014–2016	Succeeded by Khaya Magaxa
Preceded by Sue van der Merwe	Deputy Minister of International Relations and Cooperation; 2010–2014	Succeeded by Luwellyn Landers
Preceded by Pierré Uys	Western Cape Provincial Minister of Health; 2008–2009	Succeeded by Theuns Botha
Preceded by Mcebisi Skwatsha	Western Cape Provincial Minister of Transport and Public Works; 2005–2008	Succeeded by Kholeka Mqulwana
Preceded by Pierré Uys	Western Cape Provincial Minister of Local Government and Housing; 2004–2005	Succeeded by Richard Dyantyi
Preceded by Peter Marais	Western Cape Provincial Minister of Social Services and Poverty Alleviation; 2001–2004	Succeeded by Kholeka Mqulwana
Party political offices
Preceded by Mcebisi Skwatsha	Provincial Chairperson of the Western Cape African National Congress; 2011–2016	Succeeded by Khaya Magaxa
