= Theuns Botha =

South African politician

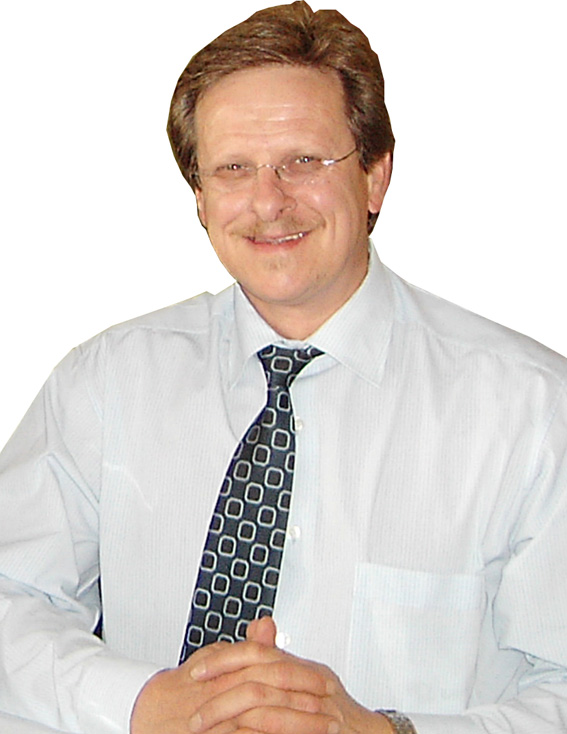

Western Cape Provincial Minister of Cultural Affairs and Sport
- In office 1 January 2015 – 19 April 2015
- Premier: Helen Zille
- Preceded by: Nomafrench Mbombo
- Succeeded by: Anroux Marais

Western Cape Provincial Minister of Health
- In office 7 May 2009 – 1 January 2015
- Premier: Helen Zille
- Preceded by: Marius Fransman
- Succeeded by: Nomafrench Mbombo

Member of the Western Cape Provincial Parliament
- In office 26 April 2004 – 19 April 2015

Personal details
- Party: Democratic Alliance
- Occupation: Politician

Theunis Louis "Theuns" Botha is a retired South African politician of the Democratic Alliance. Previously, he served as the Western Provincial Minister of Cultural Affairs and as the Western Cape Provincial Minister of Health. He also served as a Member of the Western Cape Provincial Parliament from 2004 to 2015. He was Leader of the Opposition in the Provincial Parliament from 2004 to 2009 and Leader of the Democratic Alliance in the Western Cape from 2002 to 2012. Botha was also Deputy Provincial Leader of the party from 2012 to 2015.

== Career ==
Prior to entering provincial politics, Botha was elected as a councillor of the Riversdale Municipality in 1995. In 2000, he was elected Mayor of the Hessequa Local Municipality.

In 2001, Botha was elected Western Cape Provincial Chairperson of the Democratic Alliance. He was designated to succeed Gerald Morkel as Provincial Leader of the Democratic Alliance after Morkel had announced that he would resign the role. He was elected to a full term as Provincial Leader in March 2003, after he defeated Sydney Opperman, Tony da Silva and Pauline Cupido. Botha was elected to the Western Cape Provincial Parliament in 2004 and took office as a Member on 26 April 2004. He was designated to the position of Leader of the Opposition of the legislature. He was re-elected to a second term as Provincial Leader after he defeated Lennit Max with about 69 percent of the vote.

In 2006 Botha formed a cabal of ex-New National Party stalwarts within the Democratic Alliance. Together with Dan Roodt, the far-right founder of the Pro-Afrikaans Action Group (PRAAG), their new organisation, tentatively named the "Republican Party", would unite Afrikaans-speakers (both coloured and white) with Zulu-speakers led by Jacob Zuma, who had been fired as deputy president and was in the political wilderness. In September 2007, when cabal members Kent Morkel and Kobus Brynard walked out, Theuns Botha unexpectedly decided to stay in the DA as provincial leader.

In 2009, the Democratic Alliance won a majority in the Provincial Parliament. Botha was appointed to the post of Western Cape Provincial Minister of Health. He was succeeded by Lynne Brown as Leader of the Opposition. He was re-elected to another term as Provincial Leader in 2010 after he had defeated Dan Plato and Lennit Max. Botha announced his intention to stand down as Provincial Leader of the party in 2012 and opted to run for the post of Deputy Provincial Leader. He was succeeded by Ivan Meyer as Provincial Leader, and Botha was elected Deputy Provincial Leader.

During a parliamentary debate in May 2013, Botha was accused of using the racist Afrikaans slur "bobbejaan" (baboon) in reference to African National Congress member Zodwa Magwaza. Botha denied his words but, after review of the Hansard record by the Speaker, he was forced to apologise.

In December 2014, Premier Helen Zille announced that Botha and Nomafrench Mbombo would exchange ministerial positions. Botha would become Western Cape Provincial Minister of Cultural Affairs and Sport, while Mbombo would take his position. The changes came into effect on 1 January 2015.

Botha was unseated as Deputy Provincial Leader by Bonginkosi Madikizela in April 2015. Madikizela won by a narrow margin. Botha subsequently announced his resignation from the Western Cape Government and Provincial Parliament and was succeeded by Anroux Marais as provincial minister.

Botha has since returned to the private sector and in 2017 he joined Medicoop co-operative bank as managing director.

In 2018 Botha was back in the public eye when he used social media to heavily criticise the handling of the water shortage by the Democratic Alliance

In June 2019 he was investigated for the alleged theft of 40,000 litres of water per day from his neighbour in Riversdale.

Political offices
Preceded by Nomafrench Mbombo	Western Cape Provincial Minister of Cultural Affairs and Sport; 2015	Succeeded by Anroux Marais
Preceded by Marius Fransman	Western Cape Provincial Minister of Health; 2009–2015	Succeeded by Nomafrench Mbombo
