= Richard Dyantyi =

South African politician

Member of the National Assembly
- In office 22 May 2019 – 28 May 2024

Member of the Western Cape Provincial Parliament
- In office 2004 – 7 May 2019

Western Cape Provincial Minister for Local Government and Housing
- In office 26 July 2005 – 31 July 2008
- Premier: Ebrahim Rasool
- Preceded by: Marius Fransman
- Succeeded by: Whitey Jacobs

Personal details
- Born: 25 October 1968 (age 57) Burgersdorp, Cape Province; South Africa
- Party: African National Congress

Qubudile Richard Dyantyi (born 25 October 1968) is a South African politician who represented the African National Congress (ANC) in the National Assembly from 2019 until 2024. Before that, he was a Member of the Western Cape Provincial Parliament and served as the Western Cape's Member of the Executive Council (MEC) for Local Government and Housing from 2005 to 2008. In 2021, he was elected chairperson of the national parliament's Committee for the Section 194 Enquiry into Busisiwe Mkhwebane's fitness to hold office.

== Early life and career ==
Dyantyi was born on 25 October 1968 in Burgersdorp in present-day Eastern Cape (then part of the Cape Province). His home language is Xhosa. His mother, who was divorced from his father, was a domestic worker, and as a child he lived with his grandparents, who were farm labourers. He matriculated in 1989 from All Saints College in Bisho, a private school which he attended on a scholarship and where he was first-team rugby captain.

After matriculating, he joined his mother in Khayelitsha outside Cape Town. From 1991, he began volunteering at Black Sash's advice office in Khayelitsha, and he later joined the ANC. Ahead of South Africa's first democratic elections in 1994, he served the party as an election organiser. He spent five years as a researcher at the Foundation for Contemporary Research before joining the Tygerberg Municipality in 1999, shortly before it was amalgamated into the new City of Cape Town municipality.

== Provincial legislature: 2004–2019 ==
After the 2004 general election, he joined the Western Cape Provincial Parliament, representing the ANC. On 26 July 2005, in a cabinet reshuffle by incumbent Premier Ebrahim Rasool, he was additionally appointed to the Provincial Cabinet of the Western Cape as Provincial Minister (MEC) for Local Government and Housing. In this position, he became known in South African municipal politics after he had led an unsuccessful effort in 2006 to replace the Unicity government of the City of Cape Town with a centralised executive mayor system, which would have stripped the current mayor of the municipality, Helen Zille, of her powers as mayor.

Viewed as a political ally of Premier Rasool, he was fired from the Executive Council on 31 July 2008, shortly after Lynne Brown succeeded Rasool as Premier. However, he remained an ordinary Member of the Provincial Parliament. He was re-elected to his final term in the provincial legislature in the 2014 general election, ranked fourth on the ANC's provincial party list.

== National Assembly: 2019–2024 ==
In the 2019 general election, Dyantyi did not seek re-election to the provincial legislature but was instead elected to the National Assembly, the lower house of the South African Parliament; he was ranked fourth on the ANC's provincial-to-national party list for the Western Cape. On 20 July 2021, he was elected unopposed to chair the assembly's Committee for the Section 194 Enquiry into the fitness to hold office of the incumbent Public Protector, Busisiwe Mkhwebane.

Dyantyi was ranked too low on the ANC's national list to return to parliament following the 2024 general election.

== Controversies ==
Public Protector at the time, Busisiwe Mkhwebane, laid a complaint against three ANC MPs, Dyantyi, Pemmy Majodina and Tina Joemat-Pettersson with Parliament's Joint Committee on Ethics and Members' Interests. This came after Mkhwebane's husband alleged that Joemat-Pettersson approached him for a R600 000 bribe for the three to influence the outcome of the Section 194 Enquiry into the fitness of Mkhwebane to hold office.; he also laid a complaint with the police. The Committee cleared Dyantyi and Majodina saying the claim was unfounded.

== Personal life ==
He is a single father to three sons.
