= Patrick Marran =

South African politician

Member of the Western Cape Provincial Parliament
- Incumbent
- Assumed office 22 May 2019
- Constituency: 28 May 2024

Personal details
- Party: African National Congress
- Occupation: Politician

Patrick Marran is a South African politician who served as a Member of the Western Cape Provincial Parliament for the African National Congress from May 2019 until May 2024. Marran is the party's spokesperson on agriculture.

Marran is a former councillor in the Breede Valley Local Municipality and a former chairperson of the ANC's Boland region.

Marran left the Provincial Parliament at the 2024 provincial election.
