= Gladys Bakubaku-Vos =

South African politician

Member of the Western Cape Provincial Parliament
- In office 22 May 2019 – 28 May 2024
- Constituency: Drakenstein

Personal details
- Born: Ntombezanele Gladys Bakubaku; 6 June 1966 (age 59)
- Party: African National Congress
- Occupation: Member of the Provincial Parliament
- Profession: Politician

Ntombezanele Gladys Bakubaku-Vos (born 6 June 1966) is a South African politician who served as a Member of the Western Cape Provincial Parliament from May 2019 until May 2024. Prior to serving in the provincial parliament, she was a municipal councillor of the Stellenbosch Local Municipality. Bakubaku-Vos is a member of the African National Congress (ANC).

On 5 May 2020, Bakubaku-Vos announced that she had tested positive for COVID-19. In response, the Western Cape Provincial Parliament announced that it would undergo a decontamination and sanitisation process.
