= Siyazi Tyatyam =

South African politician

Member of the Western Cape Provincial Parliament
- In office 21 May 2014 – 7 May 2019

Personal details
- Born: Siyazi Gratefull Tyatyam
- Party: African National Congress
- Profession: Politician

Siyazi Gratefull Tyatyam is a South African politician who served as a Member of the Western Cape Provincial Parliament for the African National Congress from May 2014 to May 2019. Tyatyam served as the party's deputy chief whip until his removal in 2016.

== Western Cape Provincial Parliament ==
Tyatyam was elected to the Western Cape Provincial Parliament in the 2014 general election. He took office on 21 May 2014. He was the ANC's deputy chief whip until August 2016, when the party's provincial executive committee removed him from the post.

Tyatyam did not place on the party's list for the 2019 election. On 7 May 2019, he left the provincial parliament.

=== Committee memberships ===
- Public Accounts Committee
- Budget Committee (Alternate Member)
- Conduct Committee
- Standing Committee on Economic Opportunities, Tourism and Agriculture (Alternate Member)
