= Dorothea Gopie =

South African politician

Member of the Western Cape Provincial Parliament
- In office 21 May 2014 – 7 May 2019

Personal details
- Party: African National Congress
- Profession: Politician

Dorothea Gopie is a South African politician. She served as a Member of the Western Cape Provincial Parliament from May 2014 to May 2019. Gopie is a member of the African National Congress.

== Western Cape Provincial Parliament ==
In 2014, Gopie was placed 12th on the African National Congress provincial list for that year's provincial election on 7 May 2014. The party won 14 seats in the election and Gopie was sworn in as a Member of the Western Cape Provincial Parliament on 21 May 2014.

She was not placed on the party's list for the 2019 election. On 7 May 2019, she left the provincial parliament.

=== Committees ===
- Standing Committee on Premier (Alternate Member)
- Standing Committee on Community Development
