= Lennit Max =

South African politician

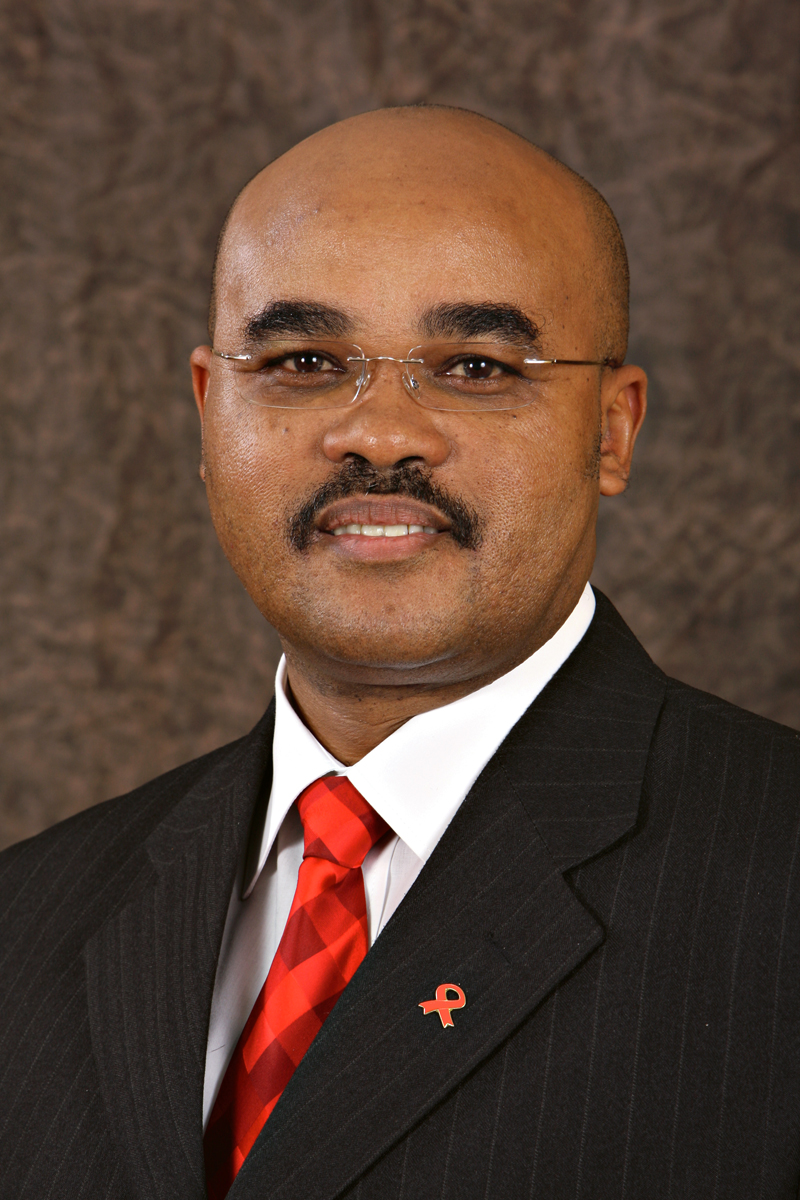

Shadow Deputy Minister of Correctional Services
- In office 10 September 2010 – 6 May 2014
- Preceded by: Albert Fritz
- Succeeded by: Werner Horn

Western Cape Provincial Minister of Community Safety
- In office 7 May 2009 – 2 September 2010
- Premier: Helen Zille
- Preceded by: Patrick McKenzie
- Succeeded by: Albert Fritz

Member of the National Assembly
- In office 10 September 2010 – 6 May 2014
- Constituency: Western Cape

Member of the Western Cape Provincial Parliament
- In office 21 May 2014 – 2 July 2018
- In office 26 April 2004 – 10 September 2010

Personal details
- Born: 1961 or 1962 (age 64–65) Overberg, South Africa
- Party: Freedom Front Plus (2021–2024)
- Other political affiliations: African National Congress (2018–2021); Democratic Alliance (2005–2018); Independent Democrats (2003–2005)
- Children: 1
- Occupation: Politician

Lennit Hendry Max (born 1961/62) is a South African politician, advocate and police officer who served as a Member of the Western Cape Provincial Parliament (2014–2018; 2004–2010), as Shadow Deputy Minister of Correctional Services (2010–2014), as Member of the National Assembly (2010–2014) and as Western Cape Provincial Minister of Community Safety (2009–2010).

He was a member of the Freedom Front Plus until his resignation in 2024. He was previously a member of the African National Congress, the Democratic Alliance and the Independent Democrats.

On 22 September 2021, Max was announced as the FF Plus's mayoral candidate for the City of Cape Town ahead of the municipal elections scheduled for 1 November 2021.

In November 2023 he was elected co-deputy leader for the Freedom Front Plus in the Western Cape.

== Family and personal life ==
Max has studied at the University of South Africa and achieved an B.Proc: LLB Degree, as well as a National Diploma in Police Science, from the university. He has also achieved a Magister Legum in Labour Law and a Higher Certificate Forensic Examination and an LLD - Doctor of Laws degree from the University of the Western Cape.

Max is married and has one child, Lennit Jr.

== Career ==
After studying, Max joined the South African Police Service (SAPS). He was appointed Western Cape Provincial Commissioner of Police in 1999 and served until 2003 when he went on early pension. He received a substantial golden handshake.

He joined the Independent Democrats in early 2003 and became Western Cape Provincial Leader of the Independent Democrats in September of the same year. He was elected to the Western Cape Provincial Parliament in 2004.

His time at the Independent Democrats was filled with controversies. The party accused him of being corrupt. The party debated whether to remove him as the party's provincial leader in 2004. He did offer his resignation as the leader but rescinded it after he heard that it would mean that he would be removed as a Member of the Provincial Parliament. He allegedly delayed his disciplinary hearings. He was suspended and expelled from the party in 2005 after the party found that he had breached his membership code of conduct.

Following his expulsion from the party, he successfully held onto his seat in the Provincial Parliament. He ultimately crossed the floor on the first day of the 2005 floor-crossing period and joined the Democratic Alliance. He was appointed party spokesperson on Community Safety.

In 2007, Max challenged incumbent Theuns Botha for the post of Provincial Leader of the Democratic Alliance. He lost by a wide margin.

After the 2009 elections, he was appointed Provincial Minister of Community Safety by Premier Helen Zille.

In March 2010, Max yet again challenged Provincial Leader Theuns Botha. Botha won with 543 out of 990 votes cast compared to Max's 317 and Dan Plato's 123 votes. Seven ballots were invalidated.

In September 2010, it was announced that Max and Albert Fritz would exchange positions. Fritz would now become a Member of the Western Cape Provincial Parliament and Provincial Minister of Community Safety, while Max would become a Member of the National Assembly and Shadow Deputy Minister of Correctional Services.

It was speculated in 2012 that Max would enter the Democratic Alliance provincial leadership race. Max said that he was interested in running for the position, but ultimately chose not to run.

In 2015, Max declared his candidacy to replace Ivan Meyer as Provincial Leader of the Democratic Alliance, as Meyer had announced that he was retiring after only one term. Max was defeated by Patricia de Lille.

In 2017, he yet again declared his candidacy for the position of Provincial Leader. Patricia de Lille resigned as Provincial Leader in February 2017 and Bonginkosi Madikizela was appointed the interim leader. Max lost to Madikizela at the party's provincial congress in October 2017.

On 30 June 2018, it was announced that Max had been appointed an advisor to the Minister of Police Bheki Cele. He resigned as MPP on 2 July 2018. It was speculated that Max would leave the Democratic Alliance, but he remained a member of the party until he announced in December 2018 that he is terminating his party membership. He subsequently joined the African National Congress.

In August 2021, Max joined the Freedom Front Plus. On 22 September 2021, he was announced as the FF Plus's candidate for mayor of Cape Town in the local government elections scheduled for 1 November 2021.

Max resigned from the Freedom Front Plus in April 2024, claiming that the party was racist and focussed exclusively on Afrikaner interests. The party denied Max's claims. Max apologised to the coloured people of South Africa for misleading them to vote for the Freedom Front Plus in 2021.
