= Mesuli Kama =

South African politician

Member of the Western Cape Provincial Parliament
- In office 22 May 2019 – 20 February 2024

Personal details
- Party: African National Congress (Until 2024)
- Occupation: Politician

Mesuli Kama is a retired South African politician who served as a Member of the Western Cape Provincial Parliament for the African National Congress. He was elected to the provincial parliament in May 2019. Kama was the ANC's spokesperson on community safety.

On 20 February 2024, Kama released a statement in which he announced that he had resigned from the provincial parliament and the ANC and was leaving active politics. Kama said in the statement that the ANC "is not ready to govern" in the Western Cape.
