= Danville Smith =

South African politician

Member of the Western Cape Provincial Parliament
- In office 22 May 2019 – 28 May 2024

Personal details
- Party: African National Congress
- Occupation: Politician

Danville Smith is a South African politician who served as a Member of the Western Cape Provincial Parliament for the African National Congress. Smith was the ANC's spokesperson on local government.

On 12 May 2021, Smith voluntarily stepped aside as a member of the provincial parliament, in line with the party's national executive committee resolution, as he has been charged with fraud and corruption. He had allegedly stolen R25,000 by submitting a fraudulent food parcel invoice for a Mandela Day event, when he was a ward councillor in Lamberts Bay. Smith is the first ANC politician in the Western Cape to have stepped aside from their position.
