= Reagen Allen =

South African politician (born 1984)

Reagen Allen MPP

Deputy Speaker of the Western Cape Provincial Parliament
- Incumbent
- Assumed office 13 June 2024
- Preceded by: Beverley Schäfer

Western Cape Provincial Minister of Community Safety and Police Oversight
- In office 26 April 2022 – 13 June 2024
- Premier: Alan Winde
- Preceded by: Albert Fritz
- Succeeded by: Anroux Marais

Member of the Western Cape Provincial Parliament
- Incumbent
- Assumed office 12 December 2018

Personal details
- Born: 25 May 1984 (age 41) Mitchells Plain
- Party: Democratic Alliance
- Spouse: Edwinah Allen
- Relations: Keith Allen (father)
- Profession: Politician

Reagen Ivan Allen (born 25 May 1984) is a South African politician and former comedian who has been the Deputy Speaker of the Western Cape Provincial Parliament since June 2024. A member of the Democratic Alliance, he has represented the party in the Provincial Parliament since December 2018. He was the Western Cape Provincial Minister of Community Safety and Police Oversight from April 2022 until June 2024.

== Life and career ==
Allen was born and grew up in Rocklands, Mitchells Plain on the Cape Flats in Cape Town. He initially began his career as a comedian. He won the Cape Town Comedy Club's 2018 #yourfunnycider competition. and was nominated for a Comics Choice Award 2019.

Allen has obtained numerous qualifications in Public Relations and Paralegal Studies. He graduated from the DA's Young Leaders Programme in 2012. He studied at the Friedrich Naumann Foundation for Freedom in Germany, while he served as the DA's Youth National Media and Publicity chairperson.

In December 2018, he was sworn in as a Member of the Western Cape Provincial Parliament. He filled the vacancy created by the resignation of Dan Plato. He was elected to a full term as a Member of the Provincial Parliament in the 2019 elections and became Chairperson of the Standing Committee on Community Safety, Cultural Affairs and Sports.

On 22 April 2022, Allen was appointed by Alan Winde as the Provincial Minister of Community Safety and Police Oversight. He was officially sworn in as Provincial Minister on 26 April 2022 by Judge Babalwa Mantame.

On 13 June 2024, Allen was elected as the Deputy Speaker of the Western Cape Provincial Parliament.
