= Wendy Kaizer-Philander =

South African politician (born 1976)

Wendy Kaizer-Philander MPP

Western Cape Minister of Social Development
- Incumbent
- Assumed office 20 August 2026
- Premier: Alan Winde
- Preceded by: Jaco Londt

Member of the Western Cape Provincial Parliament
- Incumbent
- Assumed office 15 August 2018

Personal details
- Born: Wendy Felecia Kaizer; May 28, 1976 (age 50) Paarl, Cape Province, South Africa
- Party: Democratic Alliance

Wendy Felecia Kaizer-Philander (née Kaizer; born 28 May 1976) is a South African politician who has been the Provincial Minister of Social Development in the Western Cape since August 2026 and a Member of the Western Cape Provincial Parliament since August 2018. She was previously a Member of the Mayoral Committee of the Drakenstein Local Municipality. Kaizer-Philander is a member of the Democratic Alliance.

== Life and career ==
Kaizer-Philander was born in New York, a suburb of Paarl. She is the youngest daughter of Mary and Jack Kaizer. Her mother died when she was in grade 11. She attended Paulus Joubert Primary School and Paulus Joubert Secondary School. She became a member of the Democratic Alliance in 2008. Kaizer-Philander was elected as a DA ward councillor of the Drakenstein Local Municipality in the 2011 municipal election. After the 2016 municipal election, she became a PR councillor for the DA in the municipality. She served two terms as the Mayoral Committee Member for Human Settlements and Health during the mayoralties of Gesie van Deventer and Conrad Poole.

In August 2018, Kaizer-Philander was sworn in as a Member of the Western Cape Provincial Parliament, succeeding Lennit Max. She was assigned to serve on the Social Cluster committees. Following the May 2019 general election, she was sworn in for her first full term on 22 May 2019. She is the only parliamentarian from the Drakenstein municipality. In June 2019, Kaizer-Philander was elected chairperson of the Standing Committee on Health.

Kaizer-Philander is a senior member of the Democratic Alliance Women's Network (DAWN). She is the network's provincial chairperson. She is also a member of the provincial executive committee of the Democratic Alliance.

In November 2020, she ran for DA provincial leader but lost to provincial leader Bonginkosi Madikizela. Kaizer-Philander received the second-highest number of votes at 255 after Madikizela (444) followed by the speaker of the provincial parliament, Masizole Mnqasela (210).

On 7 May 2022, she stood for interim deputy provincial leader of the DA at the party's provincial council meeting to elect new interim provincial leadership. She lost to JP Smith.

In January 2023, Kaizer-Philander was appointed as chief whip of the DA caucus in the Provincial Parliament and, therefore, the Chief Whip of the Provincial Parliament. She succeeded Lorraine Botha, who had died in August 2022.

Kaizer-Philander was re-elected to a seat in the provincial parliament in the 2024 provincial election. She was elected to chair the Social Development portfolio committee afterwards.

On 20 August 2026, premier Alan Winde appointed her Provincial Minister of Social Development, succeeding Jaco Londt, who became Provincial Minister of Education.
