= Sharna Fernandez =

South African politician (1959–2025)

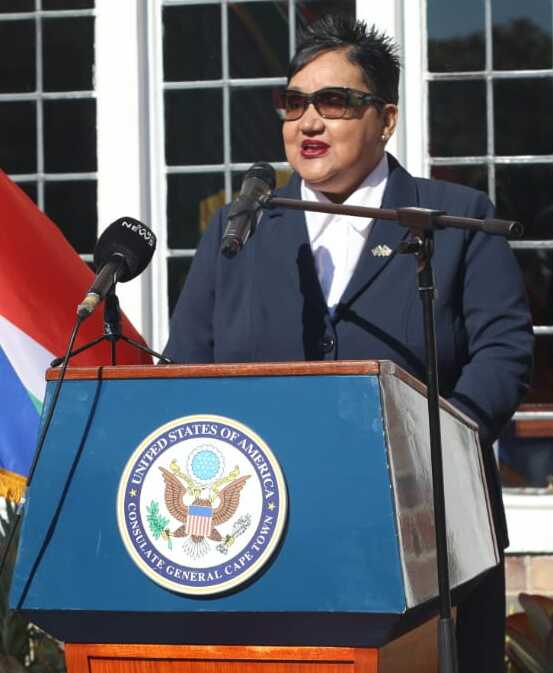
- Fernandez in 2024

Western Cape Provincial Minister of Social Development
- In office 23 May 2019 – 13 June 2024
- Premier: Alan Winde
- Preceded by: Albert Fritz
- Succeeded by: Jaco Londt

Speaker of the Western Cape Provincial Parliament
- In office 21 May 2014 – 22 May 2019
- Deputy: Piet Pretorius
- Preceded by: Richard Majola
- Succeeded by: Masizole Mnqasela

Member of the Western Cape Provincial Parliament
- In office 21 May 2014 – 28 May 2024

Personal details
- Born: 10 August 1959 Retreat, Cape Town, Cape Province, South Africa
- Died: 14 November 2025 (aged 66) Cape Town, Western Cape, South Africa
- Party: Democratic Alliance

Sharna Gail Fernandez (10 August 1959 – 14 November 2025) was a South African politician, banker and real estate professional. A member of the Democratic Alliance, she was elected a Member of the Western Cape Provincial Parliament in 2014 and became speaker of the provincial parliament thereafter. Following her re-election in 2019, she joined the provincial government as the Provincial Minister of Social Development. Fernandez retired from politics in 2024 and was employed in the real estate sector until her death.

== Early life and career ==
Fernandez was born on 10 August 1959 in Retreat, on the Cape Flats outside Cape Town. She matriculated from South Peninsula High School and completed diplomas in business management and sales and marketing. Fernandez started her career as an enquiries clerk and ended up working in the banking sector for three of South Africa's four largest banks for more than 30 years. She worked as a regional manager and then as a sales and service director before ending her banking career as an acting general manager in the mortgage division of ABSA Bank in Bloemfontein.

== Political career ==
In August 2009, Fernandez was diagnosed with the H1N1 virus and was forced to take early retirement. In 2011, Fernandez started doing community work and became actively involved in civic matters. She was chairperson of her local neighbourhood watch and participated in many local community structures. Fernandez became a member of the Democratic Alliance in May 2011. She was chairperson of the party's branch in Ward 72, centred around Princess Vlei, in the City of Cape Town for three terms and served as the deputy chairperson of the party's South Peninsula 2 constituency.

In the 2014 Western Cape provincial election, Fernandez was elected as a Member of the Western Cape Provincial Parliament for the Democratic Alliance. She was nominated as the party's candidate for speaker of the provincial parliament. Fernandez was elected at the first sitting of the provincial parliament following the election, having defeated Maurencia Gillion of the African National Congress. In October 2017, Fernandez paid back money that was spent irregularly on food items, including a polony gatsby, after the items were found to be in contravention of the provincial parliament's petty cash policy.

In September 2018, Fernandez declared herself to be a candidate to replace Patricia de Lille as Mayor of Cape Town after De Lille announced that she would step down in October 2018 after months of legal battles with the Democratic Alliance. Fernandez was one of many candidates who applied for the position, alongside former Mayor Dan Plato and Deputy Mayor Ian Neilson. Her candidacy focused on regaining the trust of the people of Cape Town by serving the people's needs and addressing crime in the city. Plato was ultimately selected for the position.

== Western Cape Provincial Government: 2019–2024 ==
Following the May 2019 elections, Fernandez was succeeded by Masizole Mnqasela as Speaker of the Western Cape Provincial Parliament. She was appointed Provincial Minister of Social Development by premier Alan Winde.

In August 2022, the Public Service Commission found Fernandez's involvement in the recruitment of a senior official in the provincial social development department to be irregular.

After Postbank announced a cardless payment system for SASSA grant beneficiaries in April 2023, Fernandez raised concerns about the new system, saying in an interview with GroundUp that the new system had not been tested yet and it might be "another blunder on the part of Postbank".

In March 2024, News24 reported that Fernandez would be retiring from the Provincial Parliament at the general election in May of that year.

== Post-political career ==
In October 2024, Fernandez started working as a real estate agent for Rawson at the company's offices in Constantia in the southern suburbs of Cape Town.

== Personal life and death ==
Fernandez had lived in many South African provinces, such as the North West, Gauteng and Free State before returning to the Western Cape in 2009.

Fernandez died in her sleep on 14 November 2025, at the age of 66. The leader of the Democratic Alliance in the Western Cape, Tertuis Simmers, paid tribute to her in a statement.
