= Ferlon Christians =

South African politician

Ferlon Christians MPP
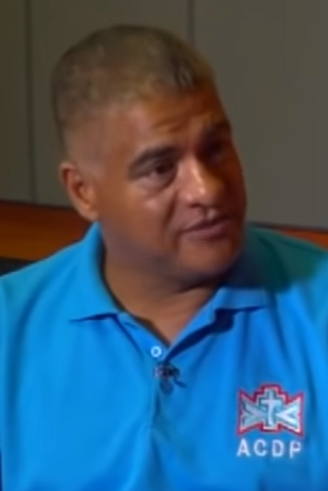

Member of the Western Cape Provincial Parliament
- Incumbent
- Assumed office 21 May 2014

Personal details
- Born: Ferlon Charles Christians
- Party: African Christian Democratic Party
- Occupation: Member of the Western Cape Provincial Parliament
- Profession: Politician
- Committees: Standing Committee on Education; Standing Committee on Community Safety, Cultural Affairs and Sport

Ferlon Charles Christians is a South African politician. A member of the African Christian Democratic Party, he is the provincial leader of the party in the Western Cape and a Member of the Western Cape Provincial Parliament. He took office as an MPP in 2014. Christians previously served as SCOPA chairperson in the provincial parliament.
