= Tasneem Essop =

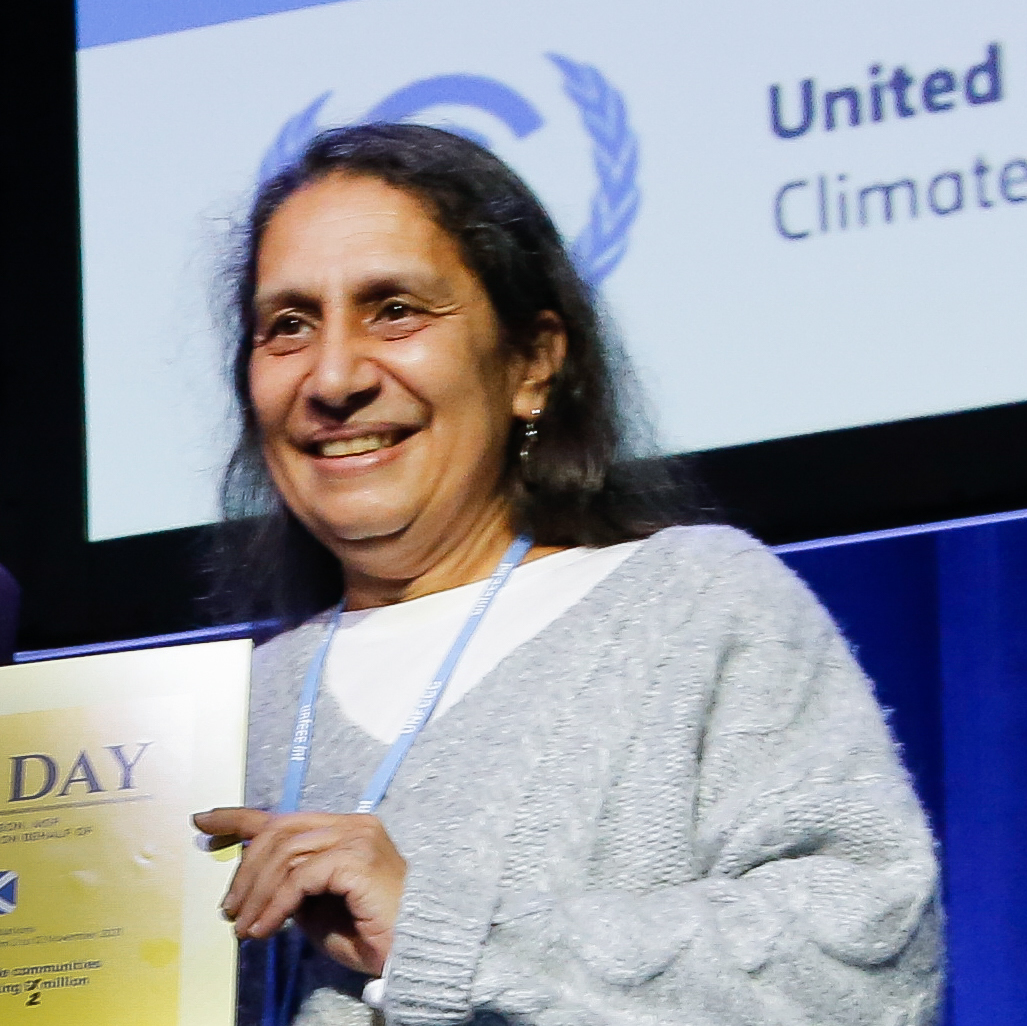
- Born: South Africa
- Employer: World Wide Fund for Nature et al

Tasneem Essop is currently (2009) the executive director of Climate Action Network, the largest global network of over 1,300 civil society organisations, in over 120 countries, fighting the climate crisis. Essop served as a former Provincial Minister of Environment, Planning and Economic Development in the Western Cape and was responsible for the Department of Environmental Affairs and Development Planning (DEADP) and the Department of Economic Development, as well as the Western Cape Investment and Trade Promotion Agency, Wesgro and the Western Cape Nature Conservation Board, CapeNature.

Essop was employed by World Wide Fund for Nature in South Africa as International Climate Policy Advocate. Essop focuses on WWF's Global Climate Deal Network Initiative. The aim of the Initiative is to secure a binding multilateral agreement, by the end of 2009 that sets the world on a path to reduce greenhouse gas emissions to 80% below 1990 levels by 2050

== Early career ==
Prior to 1994 she was an anti-Apartheid activist involved in youth, union and gender organisations. An educator by profession, she started her career in 1985, teaching English, History and Guidance at Glendale Senior Secondary in Mitchell's Plain, Western Cape.

Even though her teaching career was relatively brief, she left the secondary school in 1988. Essop worked as an Education Officer for the British Council for two years before taking up a post as Education and Media Officer at the South African Municipal Workers Union. She went on to become Cosatu's Regional Education Officer a position which she held from 1992 to 1994.

After the first democratic elections in 1994 she became an ANC Member of the Provincial Legislature (MPL) where she served as the ANC's Western Cape Spokesperson on Finance & Public Accounts.

During this period in opposition, Essop became the Chairperson of the Provincial Standing Committee on Finance (SCOPA) which exercised financial oversight over the Executive and went on to become a Founding Member and chairperson of the national Association of Public Accounts Committees (APAC) in South Africa.

== Climate advocacy ==
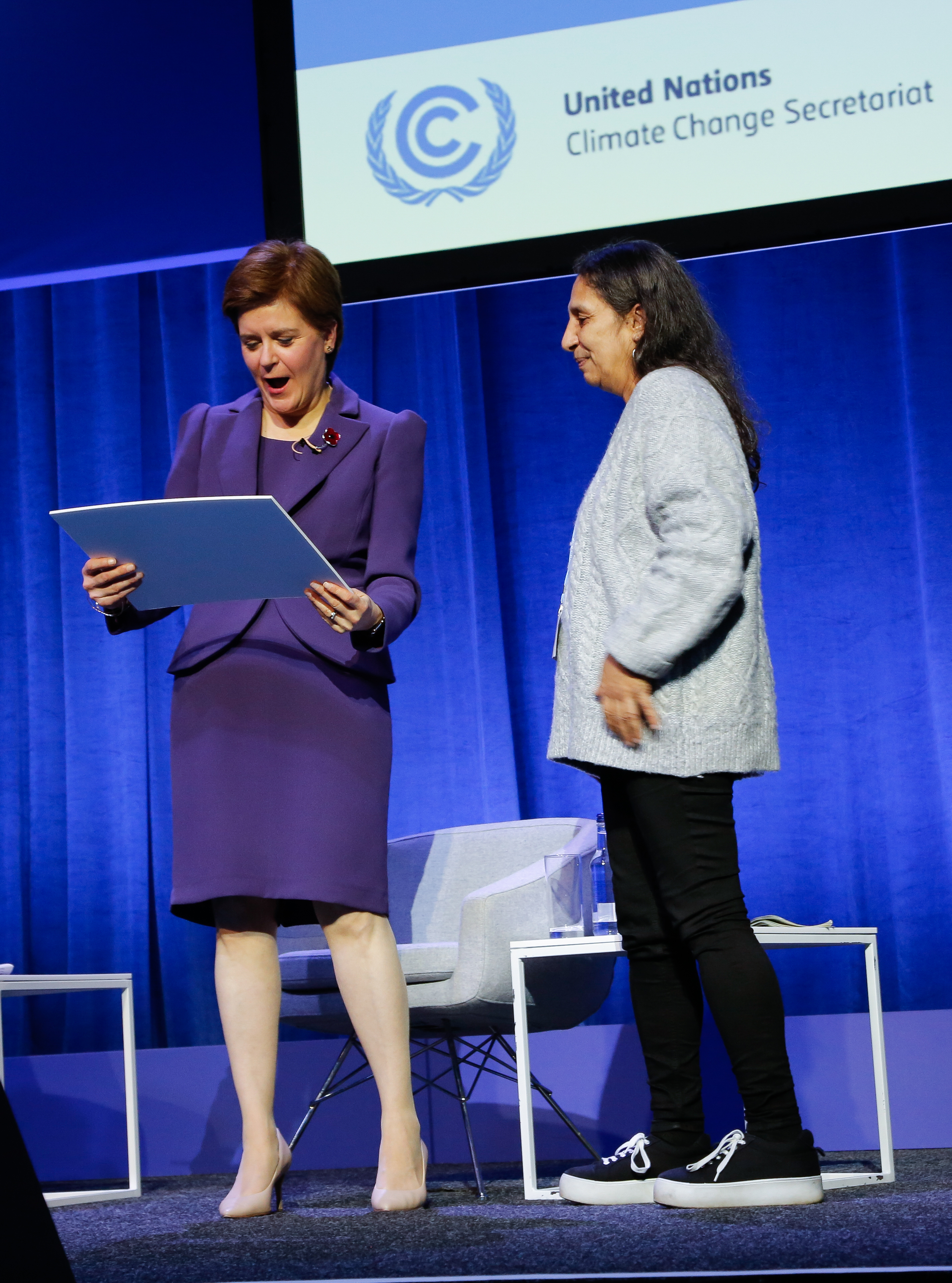
Giving Scotland "Ray of the Day" at COP26

In 2001 she was appointed as Western Cape Provincial Minister of Transport, Public Works & Property Management. In May 2004, she was appointed as Provincial Minister of Environmental Affairs and Development Planning.

Essop has been a staunch promoter of sustainable development and has piloted a number of new policies for the Western Cape province, such as the Provincial Spatial Development Framework (PSDF), a Climate Change Response Strategy, a Sustainable Energy Strategy (SES) and Guidelines for Golf Estates, Polo Fields and Polo Estates.

She has also lectured on a number of international stages on matters such as the impacts of climate change, protecting the Cape's unique biodiversity and, more recently, has become recognised as a renewable energy champion.

She was invited as a guest speaker to the Latin America and Caribbean Conference on Climate Change and visited Cuba where she met with the Deputy Minister of Science, Technology and Environment and leading biodiversity and climate change experts.

Essop is well known for saying that 'climate change is a poverty issue'.

Essop is also the leader of Provincial Government delegation in the Provincial Development Council (PDC), a social dialogue institution consisting of government, labour, civil society and business.

After the Western Cape experienced electricity shortages in 2006 Premier Rasool initiated the Energy Risk Management Committee (a broad stakeholder forum). This body, which was reactivated in 2008, is chaired by Essop and has been responsible for reducing electricity consumption, promoting energy efficiency and alternative sources of energy in the Western Cape.

In 2021 she was in Glasgow at COP26. During the meeting she gave a "Ray of the Day" to Scotland and India. Her organisation also gave "Fossil of the Day" to Norway, Australia and Japan for promoting fossil fuels.
