= Pholisa Makeleni =

South African politician

The Honourable Pholisa Makeleni MPP

Member of the Western Cape Provincial Parliament
- In office 21 May 2014 – 7 May 2019

Personal details
- Party: African National Congress
- Occupation: Politician

Pholisa Makeleni is a South African politician who served as a member of the Western Cape Provincial Legislature from May 2014 to May 2019, representing the opposition African National Congress. She served as a member of the Standing Committee on Cultural Affairs and Sport in the Legislature.
