= Ricardo Mackenzie =

South African politician (born 1977)

Ricardo Mackenzie MPP

Minister of Cultural Affairs and Sport of the Western Cape
- Incumbent
- Assumed office 13 June 2024
- Premier: Alan Winde
- Preceded by: Anroux Marais

Minister of Mobility of the Western Cape
- In office 20 February 2023 – 13 June 2024
- Premier: Alan Winde
- Preceded by: Daylin Mitchell
- Succeeded by: Isaac Sileku

Member of the Western Cape Provincial Parliament
- Incumbent
- Assumed office 21 May 2014

Personal details
- Born: Ricardo Denver Mackenzie; 15 October 1977 (age 49)
- Party: Democratic Alliance (2014–present)
- Other political affiliations: African National Congress (Until 2014)
- Education: University of the Witwatersrand
- Occupation: Member of the Provincial Parliament
- Profession: Politician

Ricardo Denver Mackenzie (born 15 October 1977) is a South African politician who has served as the Minister of Cultural Affairs and Sport of the Western Cape since June 2024. He had previously served as the Provincial Minister of Mobility from February 2023 until June 2024. A member of the Democratic Alliance, he has been a Member of the Western Cape Provincial Parliament since May 2014.

Mackenzie is a former Manager/PA to African National Congress member and national cabinet minister Fikile Mbalula. He is also the DA's constituency head in Mitchells Plain.

== Early life ==
Mackenzie studied at the University of the Witwatersrand where he obtained a graduate certificate in governance and leadership. As of 2019, he is studying for a post-graduate diploma in governance. He worked for the Presidency, Old Mutual, and JPMorgan Chase before being appointed Manager/PA to the then-Minister of Sport and Recreation Fikile Mbalula.

== Political career ==
In January 2014, Mackenzie announced that he had resigned as Mbalula's Manager/PA and as a member of the African National Congress. He joined the Democratic Alliance and was announced as a candidate for the Western Cape Provincial Parliament ahead of the 2014 general election. He was elected and sworn in as an MPP on 21 May 2014. During the fifth term of the provincial parliament, he served as the chairperson of the Standing Committee on Cultural Affairs and Sports.

Mackenzie was re-elected in the 2019 provincial election. He is the DA's constituency head in Mitchells Plain. In June 2019, he was elected as the chairperson of the Standing Committee on the Premier and Constitutional Matters.

== Provincial government ==
On 14 February 2023, Weekend Argus reported that Mackenzie was touted as the next Minister of Mobility in the Western Cape following Daylin Mitchell's departure from the position after he was elected Speaker of the Provincial Parliament in December 2022. On 20 February, Mackenzie was appointed to the position by Premier Alan Winde.

After the 2024 provincial election, Winde moved him to the Sport and Cultural Affairs portfolio of the Provincial Cabinet.
