= Nomafrench Mbombo =

South African politician (born 1966)

Nomafrench Mbombo MPP
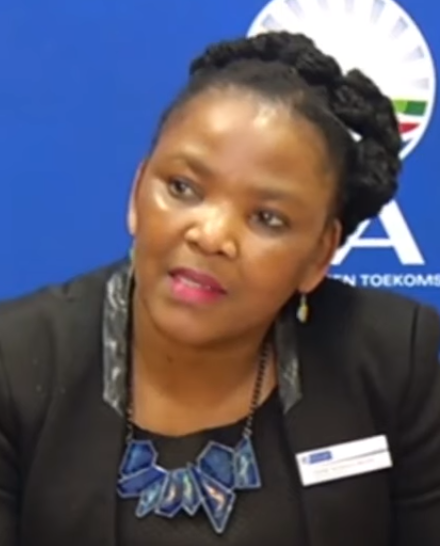
- Mbombo in 2019

Western Cape Provincial Minister of Health
- In office 1 January 2015 – 13 June 2024
- Premier: Alan Winde; Helen Zille
- Preceded by: Theuns Botha
- Succeeded by: Mireille Wenger

Federal Leader of the Democratic Alliance Women's Network
- In office 7 April 2018 – 28 April 2021
- Deputy: Dr Arlene Adams; Safiyia Stanfley
- Preceded by: Denise Robinson
- Succeeded by: Dr Arlene Adams

Western Cape Provincial Minister of Cultural Affairs and Sport
- In office 26 May 2014 – 1 January 2015
- Premier: Helen Zille
- Preceded by: Ivan Meyer
- Succeeded by: Theuns Botha

Member of the Western Cape Provincial Parliament
- Incumbent
- Assumed office 21 May 2014

Personal details
- Born: 6 September 1966 (age 59) Mdantsane, East London, South Africa
- Party: Democratic Alliance (2013–present)
- Children: 2
- Occupation: Politician

Nomafrench Mbombo (born 6 September 1966) is a South African academic and politician who has been a Member of the Western Cape Provincial Parliament since 2014, representing the Democratic Alliance. She previously served as the Western Cape Provincial Minister of Cultural Affairs and Sport from 2014 to 2015 and as the Western Cape Provincial Minister of Health from 2015 until 2024. Mbombo was the Federal Leader of the Democratic Alliance Women's Network from 2018 to 2021.

== Early life and education ==
Mbombo was born on 6 September 1966. She spent her childhood in Mdantsane, East London in the former Cape Province.

She earned a PhD in the fields of Gender and Human Rights from the University of the Western Cape. Mbombo achieved her Masters in Maternal and Child Health from the University of KwaZulu-Natal, and her Bachelors in Nursing Science from the University of Fort Hare. She was then employed in the Eastern Cape and KwaZulu-Natal provincial and local government health departments.

Before being involved in politics, she worked as an associate professor at the Faculty of Community and Health Sciences Department of the University of the Western Cape.

She has also served as a member of various organisations, such as the National Committee of Confidential Enquiries on Maternal Death, NEPAD, and the UN Office of Human Rights: Women & Gender Directorate.

As of 2024, Mbombo was bestowed the title of Honorary Professor through the School of Nursing at the University of the Western Cape, which further highlights her legacy in the healthcare sector.

== Political career ==
Mbombo, previously an African National Congress supporter, joined the DA in 2013, after attending a DA meeting for black professionals.

Mbombo was elected to the Western Cape Provincial Parliament in the 8 May 2014 election and was sworn in as a Member on 21 May 2014. She represents the Philippi region of the City of Cape Town. Premier Helen Zille appointed Mbombo to the post of Western Cape Provincial Minister of Cultural Affairs and Sport. She was sworn in as Provincial Minister on 26 May 2014.

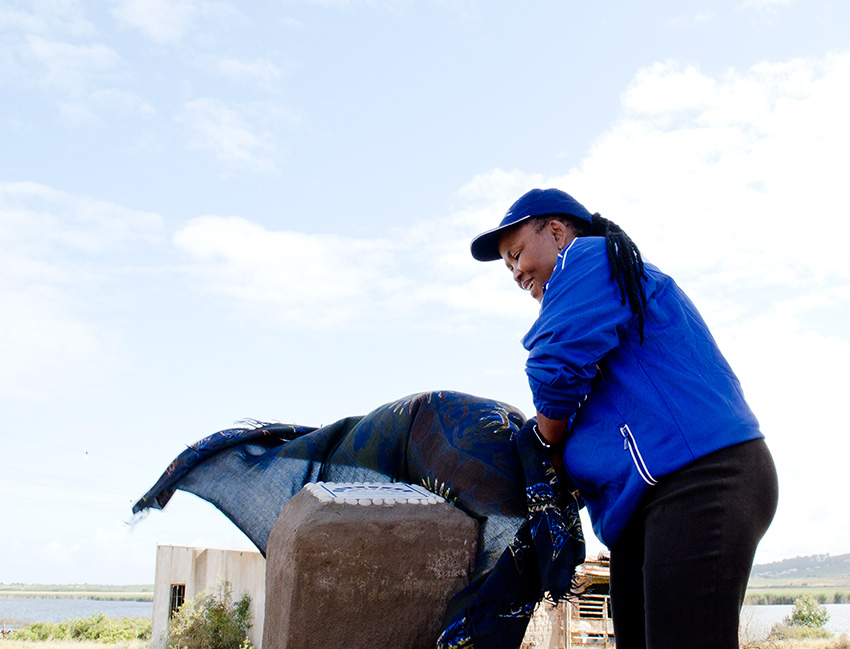
Mbombo unveiling a plaque in September 2014

In December 2014, Premier Zille announced that Theuns Botha and Mbombo would exchange ministerial positions. Mbombo would become Western Cape Provincial Minister of Health, while Botha would take her position. The changes came into effect on 1 January 2015.

In 2018, incumbent Democratic Alliance Women's Network Federal Leader Denise Robinson announced that she would not seek re-election to another term. Mbombo subsequently declared her candidacy and was elected at the party's Federal Congress on 7 April 2018.

In May 2019, newly elected premier Alan Winde announced that he had retained Mbombo in her post as Provincial Minister of Health.

In October 2019, she declared her candidacy for interim Federal Chairperson of the Democratic Alliance following Athol Trollip's resignation. She lost to Ivan Meyer.

In December 2020, Mbombo was criticised for posting on Facebook that she was on holiday in Limpopo, amid the second wave of COVID-19 infections in the Western Cape. She said that it was a "well-deserved, long overdue break".

On 28 April 2021, Mbombo resigned as the Federal Leader of the DA's Women's Network. Her resignation came after Bonginkosi Madikizela resigned as DA provincial leader and the Provincial Minister of Transport and Public Works.

In February 2023, Mbombo was officially named the Patron of the University of Cape Town's Global Surgery Programme, which was established to help create an environment that will empower leaders in their respective fields to be change agents in the health sector.

Later in 2023, Mbombo was one of the candidates awarded in "The Governing Woman" category in the Mail and Guardian's annual Power of Women award ceremony. This award acknowledges her contribution and leadership in the public sector as Western Cape Minister of Health and Wellness.

After the DA retained control of the Western Cape in the 2024 provincial election, Winde sacked her as Provincial Minister of Health.

== Personal life ==
Mbombo was married and has two daughters. Her husband died in 2003.

Party political offices
Preceded by Denise Robinson	Federal Leader of the Democratic Alliance Women's Network; 2018–2021	Succeeded by Dr Arlene Adams
Political offices
Preceded by Theuns Botha	Western Cape Provincial Minister of Health; 2015–2024	Succeeded by Mireille Wenger
Preceded by Ivan Meyer	Western Cape Provincial Minister of Cultural Affairs and Sport; 2014–2015	Succeeded by Theuns Botha
