= Beverley Schäfer =

South African politician

Beverley Ann Schäfer
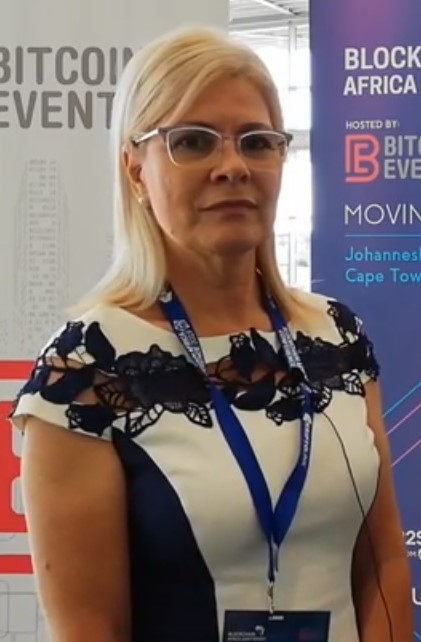
- Schäfer in 2019

Deputy Speaker of the Western Cape Provincial Parliament
- In office 22 May 2019 – 28 May 2024
- Preceded by: Piet Pretorius
- Succeeded by: Reagen Allen

Western Cape Provincial Minister of Economic Opportunities
- In office 1 November 2018 – 22 May 2019
- Premier: Helen Zille
- Preceded by: Alan Winde
- Succeeded by: Position reconfigured

Member of the Western Cape Provincial Parliament
- In office 21 May 2014 – 28 May 2024

Member of the Cape Town City Council
- In office 11 May 2011 – 7 May 2014
- Constituency: Ward 54

Personal details
- Born: Beverley Ann Schäfer
- Party: Democratic Alliance
- Education: University of the Witwatersrand
- Occupation: Politician

Beverley Ann Schäfer is a South African politician who served as the Deputy Speaker of the Western Cape Provincial Parliament from May 2019 until May 2024. She served as the Western Cape Provincial Minister of Economic Opportunities from November 2018 to May 2019. Between June 2014 and October 2018, she served as the Chairperson of the Portfolio Committee on Economic Opportunities, Tourism and Agriculture in the provincial parliament. She was the Cape Town City Councillor for Ward 54 from 2011 to 2014. She is a member of the Democratic Alliance (DA).

== Political career ==
Schäfer served as head of the Democratic Alliance's Online Marketing and Social Media Department from 2009 until 2011. In May 2011, she was elected as the Cape Town City Councillor for Ward 54. The ward included areas such as Green Point, Mouille Point, Robben Island, Sea Point, Fresnaye, Bantry Bay, Clifton and northern parts of Camps Bay.

She served as a councillor until she was elected to Western Cape Provincial Parliament in May 2014. She took office as a Member on 21 May 2014. Schäfer was subsequently appointed Chairperson of the Portfolio Committee on Economic Opportunities and a whip for the Democratic Alliance in the legislature.

On 19 October 2018, Premier Helen Zille announced that Schäfer would succeed Alan Winde as Provincial Minister of Economic Opportunities. She was sworn in on 1 November 2018 by Western Cape Judge President John Hlophe.

Schäfer was elected Deputy Speaker of the Western Cape Provincial Parliament on 22 May 2019, succeeding Piet Pretorius.

In March 2023, Schäfer was criticised for organising an event at the Provincial Parliament for British cardiologist and COVID-19 vaccine critic Aseem Malhotra to talk about "unsafe and ineffective" vaccines. Speaker Daylin Mitchell and premier Alan Winde both condemned the event.

Schäfer did not stand for re-election in 2024 and left the Provincial Parliament in May 2024.
