= Daylin Mitchell =

South African politician (born 1986)

Daylin Mitchell MPP

Speaker of the Western Cape Provincial Parliament
- Incumbent
- Assumed office 12 December 2022
- Premier: Alan Winde
- Deputy: Beverley Schäfer
- Preceded by: Masizole Mnqasela

Minister of Mobility of the Western Cape
- In office 22 April 2022 – 12 December 2022
- Premier: Alan Winde
- Preceded by: Office established
- Succeeded by: Ricardo Mackenzie

Minister of Transport and Public Works of the Western Cape
- In office 25 May 2021 – 22 April 2022
- Premier: Alan Winde
- Preceded by: Bonginkosi Madikizela; Tertuis Simmers (acting)
- Succeeded by: Office abolished

Member of the Western Cape Provincial Parliament
- Incumbent
- Assumed office 21 September 2015
- Constituency: Beaufort West

Personal details
- Born: Daylin Gary Mitchell; 7 February 1986 (age 40)
- Party: Democratic Alliance
- Occupation: Politician

Daylin Gary Mitchell (born 7 February 1986) is a South African politician who has been the Speaker of the Western Cape Provincial Parliament since December 2022. A member of the governing Democratic Alliance, he has been a Member of the Provincial Parliament since September 2015. He had previously served as the Provincial Minister of Transport and Public Works from May 2021 until April 2022 and then as Provincial Minister of Mobility until his election as speaker.

== Political career ==
Mitchell served as a youth leader in the Democratic Alliance. He also served as interim Youth Chairperson and Deputy Chairperson of the party's Western Cape Metropolitan Region. He served as National Director for Provincial Growth and Guidance from 2013 to 2014 and was the Democratic Alliance's Chief of Staff at the Provincial Parliament from 2014 to 2015.

== Provincial Parliament ==
On 21 September 2015, Mitchell was sworn in as a Member of the Western Cape Provincial Parliament. At the age of 29, he became the youngest member of the Western Cape Provincial Parliament. He was succeeded by Cayla Murray who became the youngest member of the Western Cape Provincial Parliament history in 2022 at the age of 28. For the remainder of the term, he served as Chairperson of both the Standing Committee on the Premier and Constitutional Matters and the Petitions Committee.

Mitchell was re-elected as a Member of the Provincial Parliament in May 2019. When the legislature reconvened, he was appointed Deputy Chief Whip of the Democratic Alliance caucus. In June 2019, Mitchell was elected Chairperson of both the Conduct Committee and the Standing Committee on Transport and Public Works.

== Provincial government ==
On 24 May 2021, Mitchell was appointed as the Provincial Minister of Transport and Public Works by premier Alan Winde. He succeeded Bonginkosi Madikizela, who resigned from the provincial government on 28 April after he was caught falsifying information about his qualifications on his CV. At age 35, Mitchell was the then-youngest member of Winde's provincial cabinet; now succeeded by Deidre Baartman who was appointed to the provincial cabinet in 2024 at the age of 33. He was sworn in on 25 May. Less than a year later on 22 April 2022, Winde announced that the Transport and Public Works portfolio would be abolished and that Mitchell would become the Provincial Minister of the newly established Mobility portfolio.

== Speaker of the Provincial Parliament ==
On 12 December 2022, Mitchell was elected speaker of the Provincial Parliament, defeating the ANC's Nobulumko Nkondlo in a vote that went 23–11. He succeeded Masizole Mnqasela whose party membership was terminated by the DA for making disparaging comments about the party and its decision-making processes. At age 36, Mitchell is the youngest ever speaker of the provincial parliament.
