= Ivan Meyer =

South African politician (born 1962)

The Honourable Ivan Meyer MPP
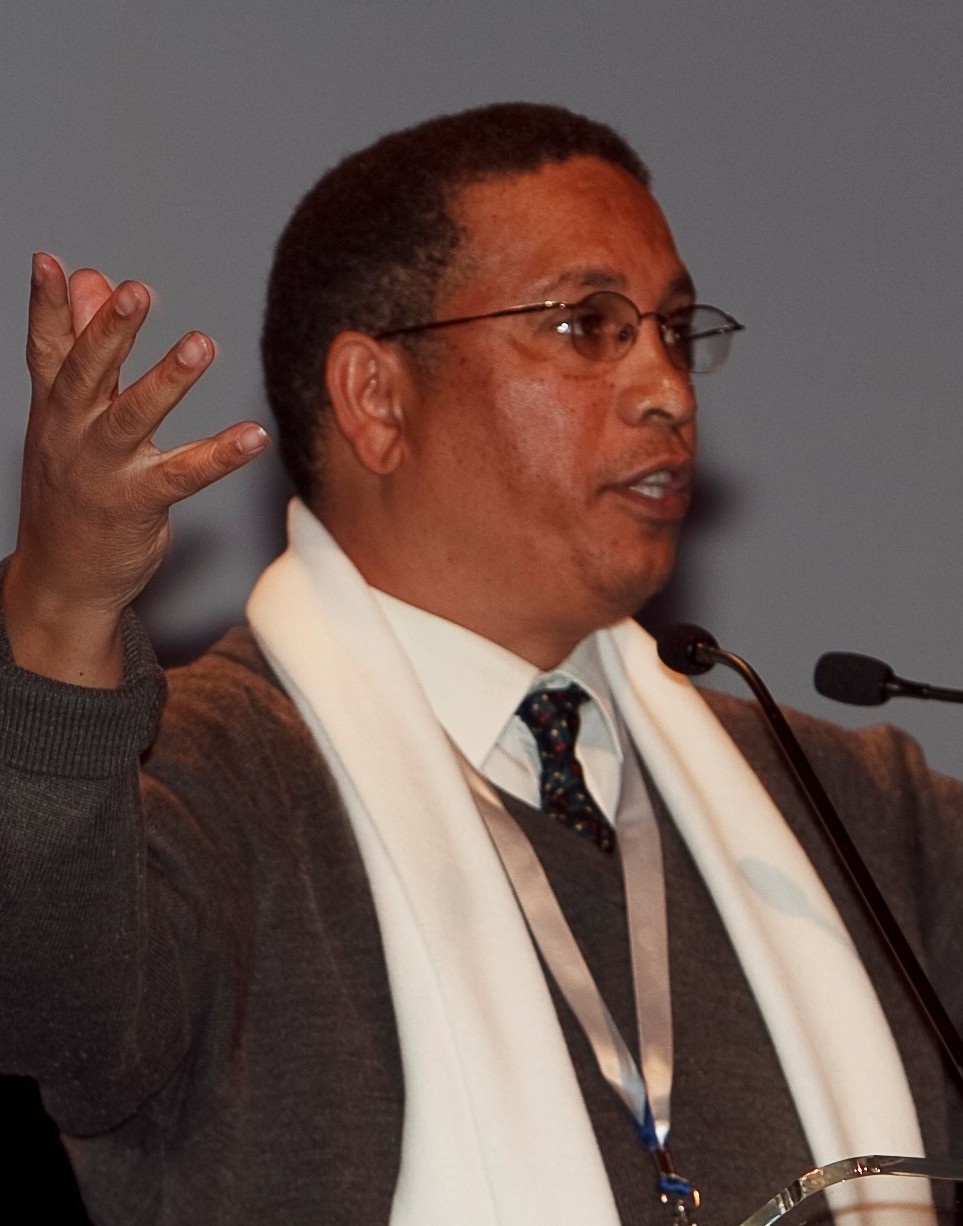
- Meyer in 2010

Federal Chairperson of the Democratic Alliance
- In office 1 November 2020 – 12 April 2026
- Leader: John Steenhuisen
- Preceded by: Athol Trollip
- Succeeded by: Solly Msimanga

Western Cape Provincial Minister of Agriculture, Economic Development and Tourism
- Incumbent
- Assumed office 23 May 2019
- Premier: Alan Winde
- Preceded by: Position established

Western Cape Provincial Minister of Finance
- In office 26 May 2014 – 22 May 2019
- Premier: Helen Zille
- Preceded by: Position established
- Succeeded by: Position abolished

Deputy Federal Chairperson of the Democratic Alliance
- In office 10 May 2015 – 17 November 2019 Serving with Refiloe Nt'sekhe and Désirée van der Walt
- Leader: Mmusi Maimane
- Chairperson: Athol Trollip
- In office 24 July 2010 – 13 October 2012
- Leader: Helen Zille
- Chairperson: Wilmot James

Western Cape Provincial Minister of Cultural Affairs and Sport
- In office 22 September 2010 – 26 May 2014
- Premier: Helen Zille
- Preceded by: Sakkie Jenner
- Succeeded by: Nomafrench Mbombo

Western Cape Provincial Minister of Social Development
- In office 7 May 2009 – 22 September 2010
- Premier: Helen Zille
- Preceded by: Zodwa Magwaza
- Succeeded by: Patricia de Lille

Provincial Leader of the Democratic Alliance in the Western Cape
- In office 13 October 2012 – 18 April 2015
- Preceded by: Theuns Botha
- Succeeded by: Patricia de Lille

Member of the Western Cape Provincial Parliament
- Incumbent
- Assumed office 6 May 2009

Personal details
- Born: 28 March 1962 (age 64)
- Party: Democratic Alliance
- Education: University of Stellenbosch (Ph.D.)
- Occupation: Politician; legislator; educator; poet; activist

Ivan Henry Meyer (born 28 March 1962) is a South African politician who has been serving as the Western Cape Provincial Minister of Agriculture, Economic Development and Tourism since 2019. He has held multiple positions in the provincial cabinet. Meyer was elected to the Western Cape Provincial Parliament in 2009. He served as the Federal Chairperson of the Democratic Alliance (DA) from November 2020 to April 2026. Meyer had served as the First Deputy Federal Chairperson of the DA from 2010 to 2012, and again from 2015 to 2019. He was also the provincial leader of the party in the Western Cape from 2012 to 2015.

== Career ==
Meyer served as the chief director of Provincial Training in the Corporate Services Directorate of the Western Cape Provincial Administration. He was a Senior Lecturer in Public Policy and Local Governance at the University of Stellenbosch. He has also published various works in the fields of education, housing, local government and public administration. Many of his poems were published in the 2012 Afrikaans anthology, Teater van ‘n Velore Tyd.

== Political career ==
In April 2009, Meyer was elected to the Western Cape Provincial Parliament. He was inaugurated as a Member on 6 May 2009. The following day, 7 May 2009, Premier Helen Zille named her Provincial Cabinet and appointed Meyer to the post of Provincial Minister of Social Development. He was sworn in on the same day.

He was elected as one of three Deputy Federal Chairpersons of the DA in July 2010.

Meyer served as Provincial Minister of Social Development until September 2010, when Zille reshuffled her Provincial Cabinet and announced that Patricia de Lille, the Leader of the Independent Democrats, would succeed Meyer. He was appointed Provincial Minister of Cultural Affairs and Sport, succeeding Sakkie Jenner.

In October 2012, he declared his candidacy to replace Theuns Botha as Provincial Leader of the Western Cape. Botha had announced his intention to retire as leader, and Meyer was elected unopposed at the party's Provincial Congress on 13 October 2012. He resigned as a Deputy Federal Chairperson on the same day.

In May 2014, he was re-elected for a second term as a Member of the Western Cape Provincial Parliament. Zille appointed him to the post of Provincial Minister of Finance. He took office on 26 May 2014.

Meyer announced in April 2015 that he would stand down as Provincial Leader of the Democratic Alliance. He was succeeded by Patricia de Lille. He announced at the party's Provincial Congress that he was running to be one of the DA's three federal chairperson deputies. Meyer was elected on 10 May 2015 at the party's Federal Congress as the first of the three deputies.

In April 2018, Meyer was re-elected as a deputy federal chairperson. He served alongside Mike Waters and Refiloe Nt'sekhe.

In May 2019, newly elected premier Alan Winde appointed Meyer as Provincial Minister of Agriculture.

In October 2019, Meyer announced his candidacy for the post of interim Federal Chairperson of the Democratic Alliance. The post became vacant after party veteran Athol Trollip resigned. He faced Nomafrench Mbombo and Khume Ramulifho for the position. Meyer won the election. He was elected to a full term in 2020, and re-elected in 2023.

Having been re-elected to the Provincial Parliament in the 2024 provincial election, Meyer was reappointed as Provincial Minister of Agriculture; he now leads the provincial Tourism and Economic Development departments as well.

In April 2026, Meyer stood for re-election as the federal chairperson of the Democratic Alliance. He was defeated by the party's Gauteng provincial leader Solly Msimanga at the party's Federal Congress. Meyer reportedly stormed out of the Federal Congress venue visibly angry after hearing that Msimanga had defeated him.

=== China and Taiwan ===
Following Meyer's January 2025 visit to Taiwan, China accused Meyer of violating its one-China principle and of "interfering in China’s internal affairs". Following the incident the Chinese government declared that Meyer and his family members were prohibited from entering the mainland in addition to the Hong Kong and Macao Special Administrative Regions of China. The sanction also prohibited Meyer from conducting economic and trade exchanges with Chinese citizens and institutions.

The visit resulted in criticism from African National Congress party members in the Western Cape legislature, accusing Meyer of risking trade and diplomatic ties between the Western Cape and China. The DA stated that they had "discussed" the issue with both Meyer and Chinese government representatives.

Meyer's father, Piet Meyer, was previously South African ambassador to Taiwan.

== Personal life ==
He is married and has children.

Party political offices
Preceded by Athol Trollip	Federal Chairperson of the Democratic Alliance; 2020–2026	Succeeded by Solly Msimanga
