= Anroux Marais =

South African politician (born 1956)

Anroux Marais MPP
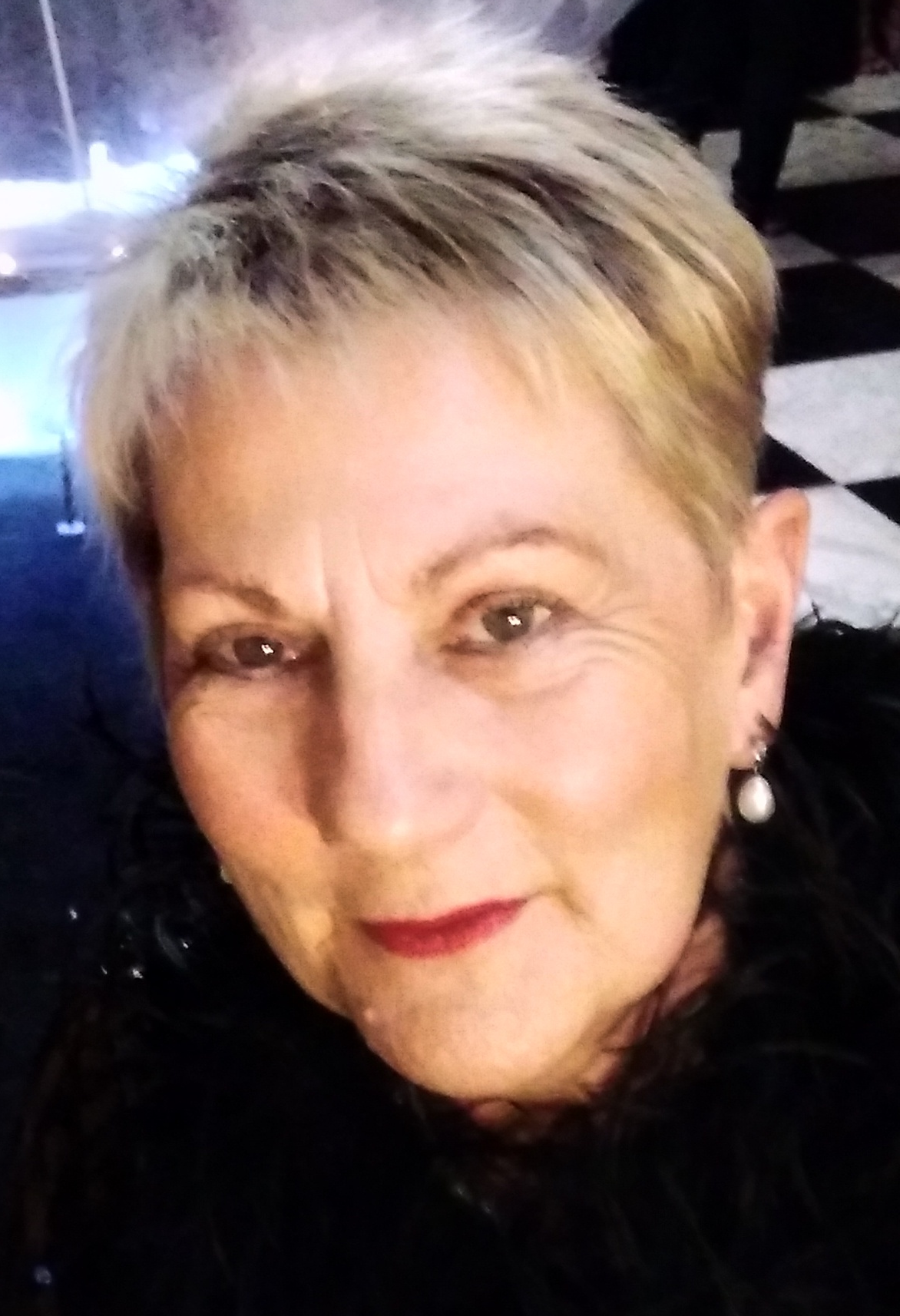
- Marais in October 2022

Western Cape Provincial Minister of Police Oversight and Community Safety
- Incumbent
- Assumed office 13 June 2024
- Premier: Alan Winde
- Preceded by: Reagen Allen

Western Cape Provincial Minister of Cultural Affairs and Sport
- In office 24 April 2015 – 13 June 2024
- Premier: Alan Winde; Helen Zille
- Preceded by: Theuns Botha
- Succeeded by: Ricardo Mackenzie

Member of the Western Cape Provincial Parliament
- Incumbent
- Assumed office 26 April 2004
- Constituency: City of Cape Town

Personal details
- Born: Anroux Johanna Du Toit; 8 December 1956 (age 69)
- Party: Democratic Alliance
- Spouse: Erik Marais
- Occupation: Politician

Anroux Johanna Marais (née Du Toit; born 8 December 1956) is a South African politician who has been the Western Cape Provincial Minister of Police Oversight and Community Safety since 2024. She previously served the Provincial Minister of Culture Affairs and Sport from 2015 until 2024. Marais has been a Member of the Western Cape Provincial Parliament since 2004, representing the Democratic Alliance.

== Political career ==
Marais served as a City of Cape Town councillor from 2000 to 2004. She was elected to the Western Cape Provincial Parliament in 2004. Marais has since been re-elected four times: in 2009, 2014, 2019 and 2024.

Marais has been a member of various committees during her tenure in the Provincial Parliament. She served a full term on the Standing Committee on Cultural Affairs and Sport. She also served as Chairperson of both the Standing Committees on Health and Social Development.

In April 2015, incumbent Provincial Minister of Cultural Affairs and Sport, Theuns Botha, announced his retirement from the Western Cape Provincial Government. Premier Helen Zille appointed Marais as the new Provincial Minister, and she took office on 24 April 2015.

In May 2015, Marais was re-elected unopposed to a second term as chairperson of the Provincial Caucus of the Democratic Alliance.

In May 2019, newly elected Premier Alan Winde retained Marais as Provincial Minister of Cultural Affairs and Sport. Marais was appointed by Winde as the Provincial Minister of Police Oversight and Community Safety in June 2024.

== Personal life ==
Marais is married to DA Member of Parliament, Erik Marais.

Political offices
Preceded by Reagen Allen	Western Cape Provincial Minister of Police Oversight and Community Safety; 2024 – present	Incumbent
Preceded by Theuns Botha	Western Cape Provincial Minister of Cultural Affairs and Sport; 2015 – 2024	Succeeded by Ricardo Mackenzie
