= Tertuis Simmers =

South African politician (born 1983)

Tertuis Simmers MPP
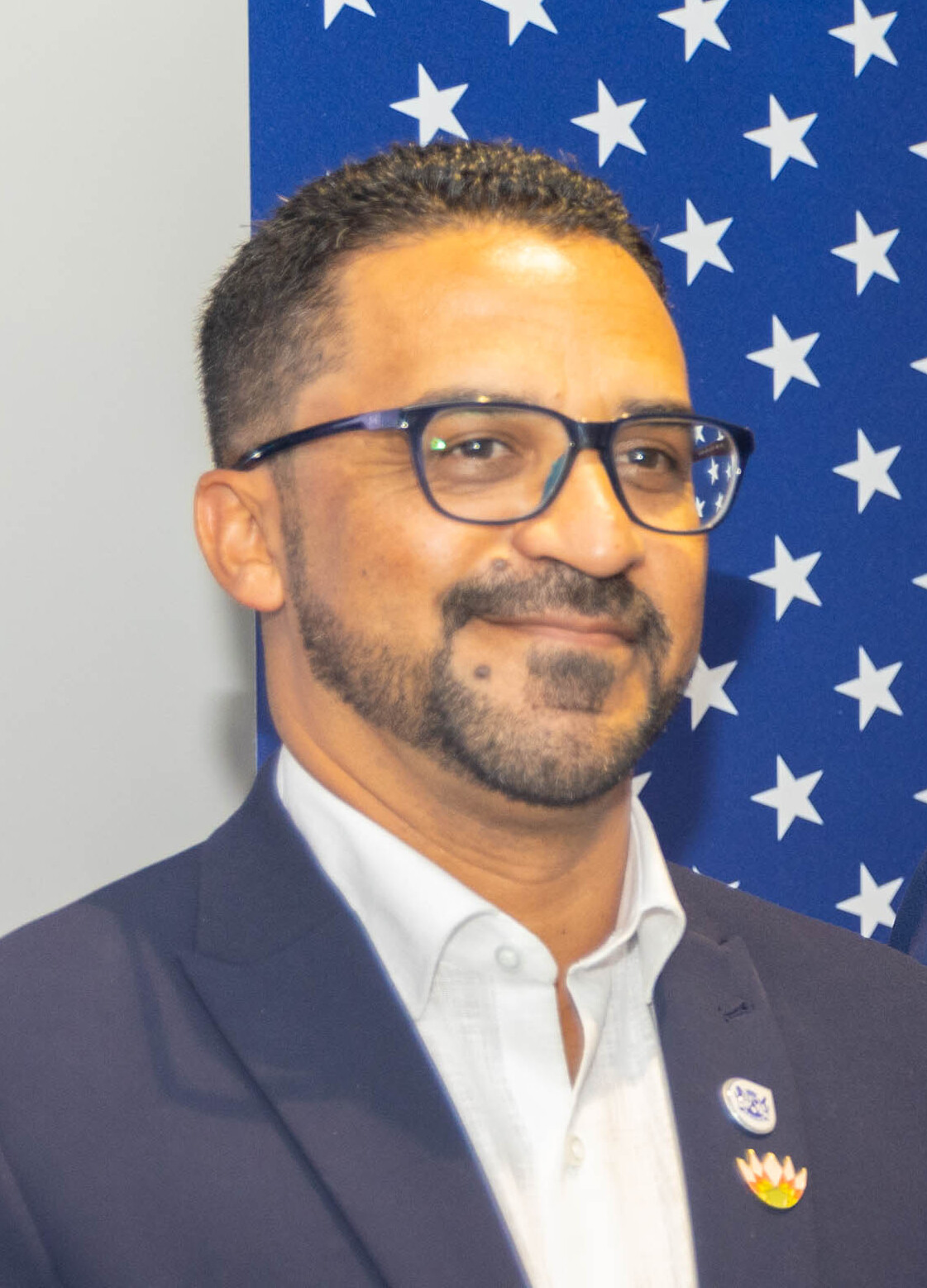
- Simmers in 2024

Leader of the Democratic Alliance in the Western Cape
- Incumbent
- Assumed office 7 May 2022 (Note: He was appointed acting interim provincial leader on 22 January 2022 after incumbent interim provincial leader Albert Fritz was suspended by the party over sexual assault allegations. Fritz later resigned from the party and Simmers was elected interim provincial leader on 7 May 2022. Simmers was elected provincial leader for a full term on 11 November 2023.)
- Deputy: JP Smith (interim); Geordin Hill-Lewis
- Preceded by: Albert Fritz (interim)

Western Cape Provincial Minister of Infrastructure
- Incumbent
- Assumed office 22 April 2022
- Premier: Alan Winde
- Preceded by: Office established

Western Cape Provincial Minister of Human Settlements
- In office 23 May 2019 – 22 April 2022
- Premier: Alan Winde
- Preceded by: Bonginkosi Madikizela
- Succeeded by: Office abolished

Acting Western Cape Provincial Minister of Transport and Public Works
- In office 28 April 2021 – 24 May 2021
- Premier: Alan Winde
- Preceded by: Bonginkosi Madikizela
- Succeeded by: Daylin Mitchell

Member of the Western Cape Provincial Parliament
- Incumbent
- Assumed office 12 June 2017

Interim Deputy Leader of the Democratic Alliance in the Western Cape
- In office 21 August 2021 – 7 May 2022
- Leader: Albert Fritz (interim)
- Preceded by: Albert Fritz
- Succeeded by: JP Smith (interim)

Personal details
- Born: 23 March 1983 (age 43) Nelspruit, South Africa
- Party: Democratic Alliance
- Children: Four
- Education: Postgraduate Diploma: Management
- Occupation: Politician

Tertuis Alfred Simmers (born 23 March 1983) is a South African politician who has been serving as the Western Cape Provincial Minister of Infrastructure since April 2022. He previously served as the Western Cape Provincial Minister of Human Settlements from May 2019 to April 2022. He has been a Member of the Western Cape Provincial Parliament since 2017. Simmers is a member of the Democratic Alliance.

On 21 August 2021, he was elected as the DA's interim deputy leader in the Western Cape. Following Albert Fritz's resignation from the DA over sexual assault allegations, he was elected interim provincial leader of the DA in May 2022. He was elected provincial leader for a full term in November 2023.

== Family and personal life ==
Simmers was born in Nelspruit on 23 March 1983. He qualified as a Skills Development Facilitator in 2015.

== Political career ==
Before being sworn in as a Member of the Provincial Parliament, Simmers was involved in the politics of the Eden District Municipality, from 2011 to 2017. He was the municipality's speaker and a member of the mayoral committee. He also held leadership positions in the George Local Municipality.

Additionally, he served on the Western Cape Bargaining Council Division of the South African Local Government Association.

== Provincial government ==
Simmers was sworn in as a Member of the Western Cape Provincial Parliament on 12 June 2017. Following the Democratic Alliance's victory in the Western Cape in May 2019, Simmers was appointed as the Provincial Minister of Human Settlements by the newly elected premier, Alan Winde.

On 7 November 2020, Simmers was elected unopposed as chairperson of the DA's east region in the Western Cape. He took over from Jaco Londt, who stood down. Simmers was a candidate for DA deputy provincial leader, but lost to incumbent Albert Fritz at the DA's provincial elective conference on 21 November 2020.

On 15 April 2021, Simmers was appointed as the acting Provincial Minister of Transport and Public Works following the suspension of Bonginkosi Madikizela, who was also the provincial leader of the DA at the time, after he was caught falsifying information on his CV. Madikizela soon resigned from the provincial government on 28 April. Simmers continued to serve as acting Provincial Minister until Daylin Mitchell was appointed as the Provincial Minister of Transport and Public Works on 25 May.

On 21 August 2021, Simmers was elected as the interim deputy provincial leader of the Democratic Alliance in the Western Cape, defeating his only opponent for the position, Breede Valley Mayor Antoinette Steyn. His election came after the role of deputy leader became vacant when Fritz resigned after his election as interim provincial leader following Madikizela's resignation. At the age of 38, he became the youngest ever deputy provincial leader of the party in the Western Cape.

In January 2022, interim DA provincial leader Albert Fritz stepped aside from the position amid a sexual misconduct scandal. Simmers was appointed as the acting provincial leader for the time being. Fritz officially resigned from the position and the DA on 1 March 2022 after an independent report found sufficient evidence of sexual misconduct. On 18 April 2022, the DA announced that Simmers was the only candidate nominated for interim provincial leader ahead of the party's provincial council meeting on 7 May 2022.

On 22 April 2022, Winde carried out a major reshuffle of his provincial cabinet and appointed Simmers as the Provincial Minister for the newly established Infrastructure portfolio. On 7 May 2022, Simmers was elected unopposed as the DA interim provincial leader.

At the DA's provincial conference on 11 November 2023, Simmers was elected DA provincial leader for a full term, having defeated former provincial leader Bonginkosi Madikizela.

After Alan Winde was re-elected for a second term as premier on 13 June 2024, he announced his provincial cabinet for the new administration which saw Simmers remain as Provincial Minister of Infrastructure.

== Controversies ==
GOOD Party MPL Brett Herron raised allegations the Simmers stole electricity while a DA Councilor in George Municipality. Brett Herron questioned Premier Alan Winde about the appointment of Simmers to his Cabinet, raising the issue of the electricity theft allegations once again. Herron claims that the George council amended the electricity meter tampering policy to protect Simmers. Herron further alleges that Simmers participated in that vote while still serving as a councillor in George. A police spokesperson said "the case was withdrawn by the National Prosecuting Authority during July 2017. The case is therefore regarded as being finally closed."
