= Anton Bredell =

South African politician (born 1965)

The Honourable Anton Bredell MPP
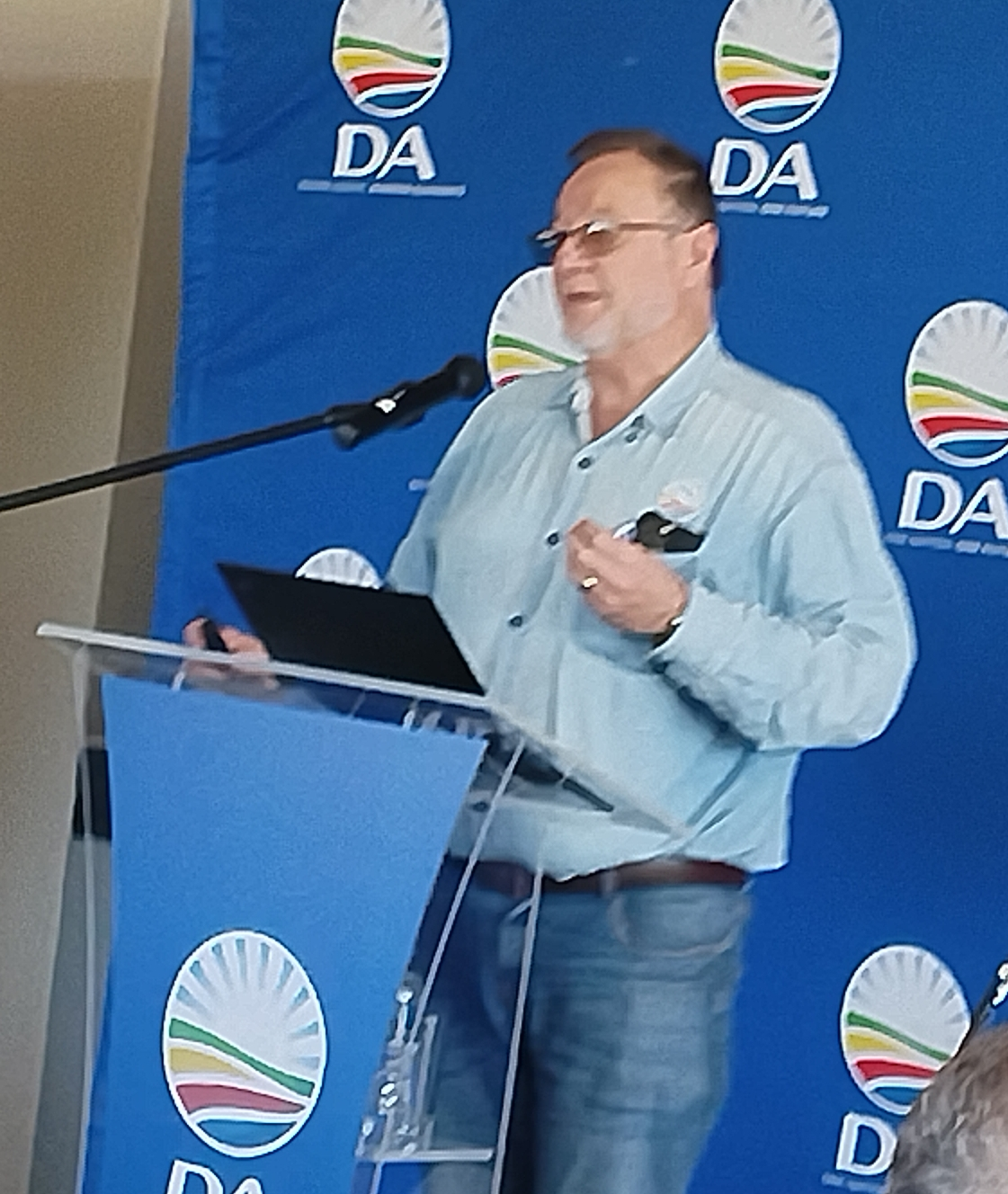
- Bredell in 2026

Western Cape Provincial Minister of Local Government, Environmental Affairs and Development Planning
- Incumbent
- Assumed office 7 May 2009
- Premier: Alan Winde; Helen Zille
- Preceded by: Pierre Uys

Member of the Western Cape Provincial Parliament
- Incumbent
- Assumed office 6 May 2009

Deputy Federal Chairperson of the Democratic Alliance
- In office 1 November 2020 – 12 April 2026

Personal details
- Born: Anton Wilhelm Bredell; 26 April 1965 (age 61)
- Party: Democratic Alliance
- Occupation: Politician

Anton Wilhelm Bredell (born 26 April 1965) is a South African politician for the Democratic Alliance. He is the current Western Cape Provincial Minister of Local Government, Environmental Affairs and Development Planning and a Member of the Western Cape Provincial Parliament.

== Biography ==
Anton Bredell studied Marketing and Sales Management after finishing high school. He received the title of Marketing Person of the year in 1996.

== Political career ==
Bredell became involved in politics in the town of Darling. He served as a municipal councillor prior to his advancement to the post of Deputy Mayor of Darling Transitional Council. Later on, he assumed the position of Mayor of the Swartland Municipality.

Bredell was elected to the Western Cape Provincial Parliament in May 2009, and Premier Helen Zille appointed him as Provincial Minister of Local Government, Environmental Affairs and Development Planning.

In May 2019, newly elected Premier Alan Winde kept Bredell in his position.

Bredell is the longest serving Provincial Minister for any portfolio in the Western Cape Government. As Provincial Minister for Local Government, he has been uncompromising when it comes to ensuring the thirty municipalities in the province are well managed. In 2019 the province boasted with 25 unqualified audits. In addition twelve councils were awarded clean audit status by the Auditor General of South Africa, up from zero in 2009 when Bredell had been appointed to the position.

In 2020, Bredell was elected as one of three deputy federal chairpersons of the DA.

In October 2021, Public Protector Busisiwe Mkhwebane found that Bredell had breached the Executive Code of Ethics over his failure to act against officials, who committed fraud and corruption at the Oudtshoorn Local Municipality. Mkhwebane also found Premier Winde guilty of breaching the code.

Bredell was re-elected for a second term as a deputy federal chairperson of the DA at the party's Federal Congress in 2023.

Bredell was re-elected to the Provincial Parliament in the 2024 provincial election. Alan Winde named his new provincial cabinet on 13 June 2024 which saw Bredell remain as the Provincial Minister of Local Government, Environmental Affairs and Development Planning.

Bredell stood down as a deputy federal chairperson at the DA's Federal Congress in 2026.

== Controversies ==
Bredell has been involved in several controversies since 2019. The MEC had been found to be in breach of the Executive Ethics Code by the Public Protector who "found Bredell's conduct was improper and constituted a direct conflict between his official responsibilities as the MEC responsible for local government and his private interests as the Western Cape provincial chairperson of the DA at the time." The report states that "the MEC's intention was to achieve political advantage for the DA, instead of acting in accordance with the constitutional imperative of assisting the municipality as the MEC responsible for local government in the Western Cape province. A Western Cape judge slated Bredell's actions in Kannaland as "unlawful and unconstitutional." Bredell was found to have breached his Executive Ethics Code again when he wrongfully sought to ensure that the DA's preferred candidate was appointed instead of the candidate selected through the municipal selection process, is one of a number of similar complaints that have been submitted for investigation.
