= Western Cape Department of Community Safety =

Community Safety department of the Western Cape Government

Department overview
- Jurisdiction: Government of the Western Cape
- Headquarters: 35 Wale Street, Cape Town, 8000
- Annual budget: R392,914,000 (2020/21)
- Minister responsible: Anroux Marais, Provincial Minister of Community Safety
- Department executive: Yashina Pillay, Head of Department

The Western Cape Department of Community Safety is the department of the Western Cape government responsible for policing. As of February 2022, its political head is Anroux Marais.

== See also ==
- Crime in South Africa
