= Lynne Brown =

South African politician (born 1961)

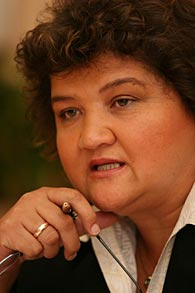
- Lynne Brown in 2007

Minister of Public Enterprises
- In office 25 May 2014 – 27 February 2018
- President: Jacob Zuma; Cyril Ramaphosa
- Preceded by: Malusi Gigaba
- Succeeded by: Pravin Gordhan

6th Premier of the Western Cape
- In office 25 July 2008 – 6 May 2009
- Preceded by: Ebrahim Rasool
- Succeeded by: Helen Zille

Member of the National Assembly
- In office 21 May 2014 – 1 March 2018

Personal details
- Born: 26 September 1961 (age 64) Cape Town, Cape Province, South Africa
- Party: African National Congress

Lynne Brown (born 26 September 1961) is a South African politician who is a former Minister of Public Enterprises and former Premier of the Western Cape Province. She was born in Cape Town and grew up in Mitchells Plain. She was appointed Premier of the Western Cape following the resignation of Ebrahim Rasool in July 2008. Previously, she was Minister for Economic Development and Tourism. She is a member of the African National Congress (ANC) and an elected member of its National Executive Committee in 2007 and 2012. She is from a coloured background and was the fourth coloured premier of the Western Cape, the second from the ANC, and the first openly gay person to be appointed to a cabinet post in any African government.

== Political career ==
Brown was chairperson of the Mitchell's Plain Youth Congress in 1979 and a member of the United Women's Organisation from 1979 to 1985. She was a member of the United Women's Congress from 1985 to 1990, serving first as Education Officer and then as Provincial Secretary. She was involved in the United Democratic Front from its formation in 1983 until its disbandment in 1991, serving as a member of its Finance Committee.

Brown joined the ANC in 1987 and was elected to the Provincial Executive Committee and Provincial Working Committee in 1999. She has served as Western Cape Provincial Secretary of the ANC Women's League since 1990. Her involvement in education continued after her teaching years. She was a board member of the National Literacy Project and is currently a board member of the Extramural Education Project. She initiated and was director of the Women's College in 1990. In 1994 and again in 1999 she was elected as an ANC Member of the Western Cape Provincial Legislature. She was chairperson of the standing committees on Community Services and on Health and Welfare, and served as an ANC Whip and Chief Whip in the legislature. She stood as the ANC's candidate as Mayor of Cape Town in 1999 and served as provincial Minister (MEC) for finance, economic development and tourism until her elevation to the office of Premier in 2008.

The ANC lost control of the province in the 2009 general election with the Democratic Alliance garnering 22 of the 42 seats in the Provincial Parliament. The DA premier candidate Helen Zille replaced Brown on 6 May 2009. She served as Leader of the Official Opposition from 2009 until May 2014, when she was appointed by former President Jacob Zuma to his cabinet as Minister of Public Enterprises.

Lynne Brown's political legacy hung in the balance following the Eskom enquiry. She initially claimed the Eskom inquiry amounted to a kangaroo court after she was called a liar by Eskom board spokesman Khulani Qoma over her role in the state capture of the power utility. She denied having read the Gupta emails despite receiving them from Natasha Mazzone, and denied that President Zuma had called her after meeting Zola Tsotsi (Eskom Chairman at the time), a meeting that led to the suspension of senior executives Tshediso Matona, Dan Marokane, Tsholofelo Molefe and Matshela Koko. She denied knowing Tony Gupta and Salim Essa after Tsotsi stated under oath that Brown had invited him to her house and "Tony Gupta and Salim Essa were present."

In February 2018 she was removed from the Cabinet of President Cyril Ramaphosa, being succeeded by Pravin Gordhan and subsequently resigning as an ANC member of parliament.

== State Capture Commission ==
The State Capture Commission, better known as the Zondo Commission, found that Brown, whilst serving as the Minister of Public Enterprises, had between 2014 and 2015 appointed several people to the Board of Eskom with disregard to official vetting processes and that Brown had failed to consider the recommendations on the database of the Department of Public Enterprises (DPE). Her actions were found to have culminated in the appointment of several persons with conflicts of interests and associations with Salim Essa and the Gupta family, and many with no prior experience as directors of any state-owned enterprise.

In an affidavit to the Zondo Commission in 2021, Brown testified that she did not know who Salim Essa was and that she was merely following the procedures given to her by the DPE. However, the Zondo Commission subsequently identified an association between Brown and Salim Essa. The Zondo commission identified a log of several phone calls between Brown and Salim Essa during 2014. The Zondo Commission further identified a trail of emails between Brown, her personal assistant Kim Davids and a 'Business Man' email account – an alias which was found to be Salim Essa's pseudonym. The Zondo Commission also found that Brown's actions were in contradiction to her testimony, in that she had in fact failed to follow the DPE's processes and recommendations and that she ultimately merely circulated an advertisement in newspapers inviting anyone to apply for nomination to the Board. The Zondo Commission thus found that the evidence clearly showed Brown was familiar with Salim Essa and that she had cooperated in the capture of Eskom.

The commission found Brown to have abused her position in influencing board appointments of participants in the Gupta network at various state-owned companies including Eskom, Transnet and Denel. A parliamentary inquiry found that Brown and her predecessor, Malusi Gigaba, had been “grossly negligent in carrying out their responsibility”.

== Personal life ==
Brown is openly gay.

== See also ==
- List of LGBT heads of government
- List of the first LGBT holders of political offices

Political offices
Preceded by Ebrahim Rasool	Premier of the Western Cape; 25 July 2008 – 6 May 2009	Succeeded by Helen Zille
