= Member of Provincial Parliament (Western Cape) =

Member of the legislature of Western Cape

In the Western Cape province of South Africa, Member of Provincial Parliament (MPP) is the designation given to members of the Western Cape Provincial Parliament.

The Western Cape is the only South African province to refer to its legislature as the Provincial Parliament; in the other eight provinces the designation for legislators is Member of the Provincial Legislature (MPL).

== See also ==
- List of Members of the Western Cape Provincial Parliament
