= 2019 Western Cape provincial election =

Election in South Africa

- 8 May 2019

All 42 seats to the Western Cape Provincial Parliament 22 seats needed for a majority
- Turnout: 66.28% ▼6.48%
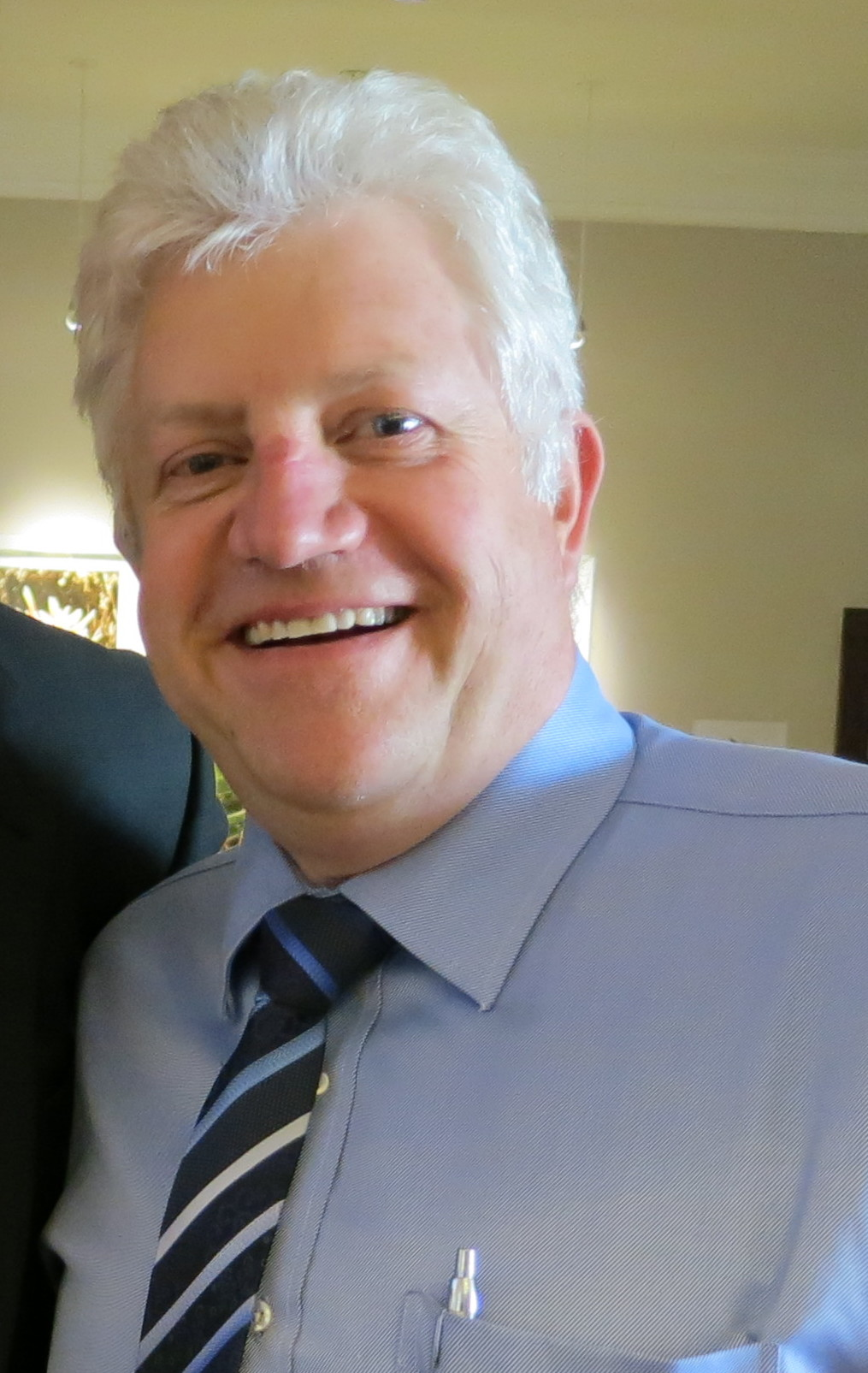

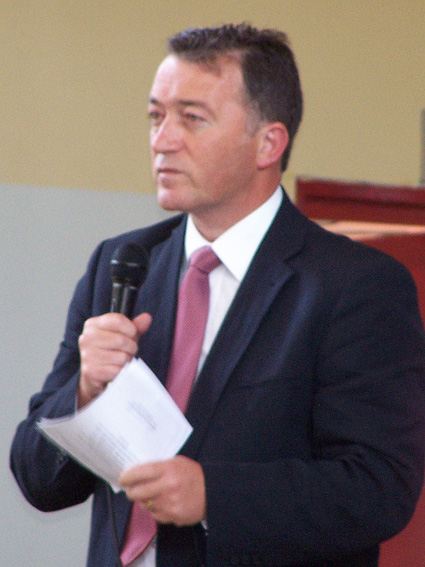

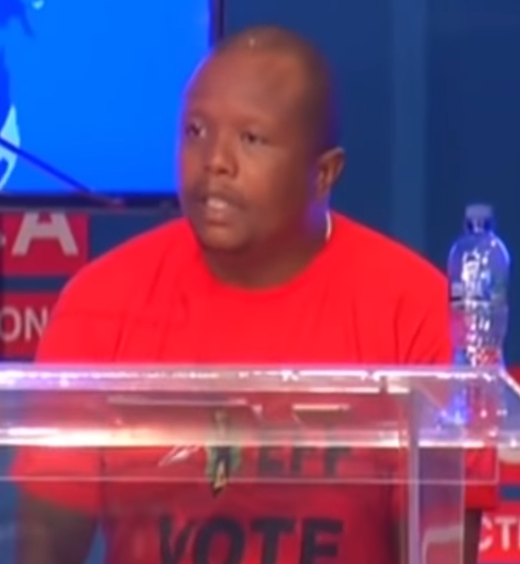

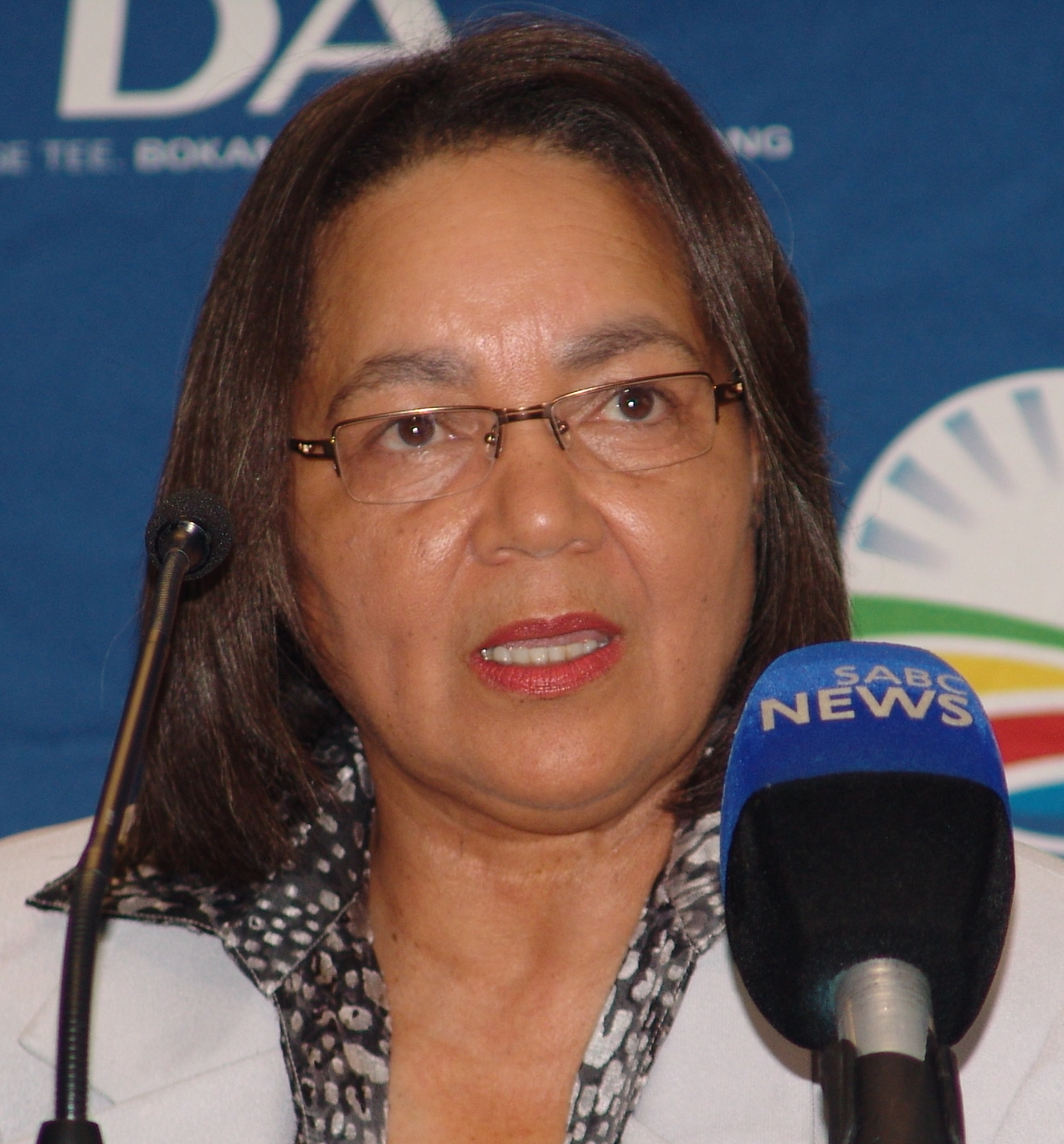

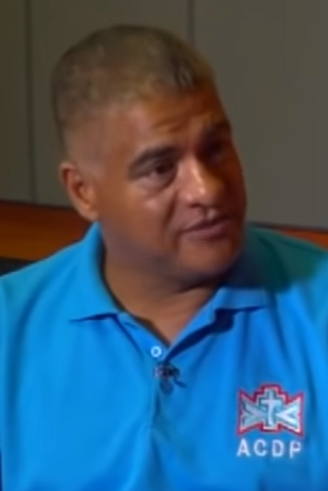

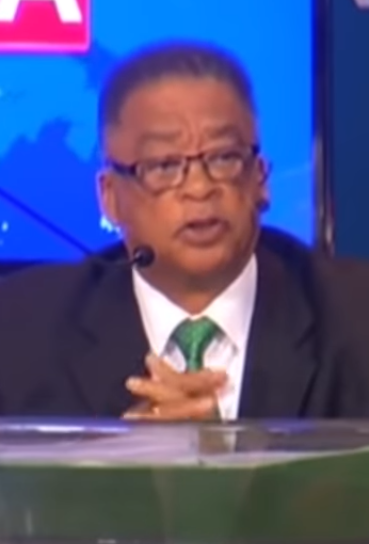
	First party	Second party	Third party
Candidate	Alan Winde	Cameron Dugmore (Note: Dugmore was announced as the ANC's premier candidate following the election.)	Melikhaya Xego
Party	DA	ANC	EFF
Last election	59.38%	32.89%	2.11%
Seats before	26	14	1
Seats won	24	12	2
Seat change	▼2	▼2	▲1
Popular vote	1,140,647	589,055	83,075
Percentage	55.45%	28.64%	4.04%
Swing	▼3.93	▼4.25	▲1.93
	Fourth party	Fifth party	Sixth party
Candidate	Patricia de Lille	Ferlon Christians	Peter Marais
Party	Good	African Christian Democratic Party	Freedom Front Plus
Last election	(New party)	1.02%	0.55%
Seats before	0	1	0
Seats won	1	1	1
Seat change	▲1	Steady	▲1
Popular vote	61,971	54,762	32,115
Percentage	3.01%	2.66%	1.56%
Swing	▲3.01	▲1.64	▲1.01
Premier before election
Helen Zille
Democratic Alliance
Elected Premier
Alan Winde
Democratic Alliance

The 2019 Western Cape provincial election was held on 8 May 2019 to elect the 6th Western Cape Provincial Parliament. It was the sixth provincial election held since the establishment of the provincial legislature in 1994.

Incumbent premier Helen Zille of the Democratic Alliance (DA) was term-limited and could not seek a third term. The party nominated Alan Winde to succeed her.

The provincial election was won by the ruling Democratic Alliance (DA), but with a reduced majority of 55.45%, down from 59.38% in the 2014 election. The party lost two seats and achieved a majority of 24 seats in the legislature. The Official Opposition African National Congress (ANC) declined from 32.89% to 28.64%, and also lost two seats. The Economic Freedom Fighters (EFF) significantly grew, going from 2.11% to 4.04%, and, consequently, gained one seat. The newly-formed Good received 3.11% of the vote and won a seat. The African Christian Democratic Party (ACDP) grew to 2.66% and retained its sole seat. The Freedom Front Plus (FF+) and Al Jama-ah also won one seat each.

== Background ==
The 2014 provincial election resulted in the continuation of the incumbent Democratic Alliance provincial government headed by Helen Zille. This would be Zille's second and final term as Premier of the Western Cape. The party increased its seat total from 22 to 26 seats. The African National Congress with Marius Fransman remained the Official Opposition with 14 seats. The newly-formed Economic Freedom Fighters became the third largest party with only one seat. The African Christian Democratic Party retained its sole seat.

On 18 April 2015, incumbent Democratic Alliance Provincial Leader Ivan Meyer announced that he would not seek re-election. Mayor of Cape Town Patricia de Lille was elected as his successor.

In January 2016, allegations of sexual harassment were made against African National Congress Provincial Chairperson Marius Fransman by his former assistant, Louisa Wynand. The party named Khaya Magaxa as his acting successor. Fransman was suspended as Provincial Chairperson in February 2016, and expelled from the African National Congress in November 2016.

In February 2017, Patricia de Lille resigned as Provincial Leader of the Democratic Alliance in order to focus on her mayorship. Deputy Provincial Leader Bonginkosi Madikizela was designated as the interim leader of the party. Madikizela was later elected to a full term in October 2017.

Throughout 2017 and 2018, the Democratic Alliance accused Patricia de Lille of maladministration and covering up corruption in the City of Cape Town. She strongly denied these allegations.

In April 2018, former Western Cape Premier Ebrahim Rasool was announced as the head of the ANC's Western Cape elections campaign.

In August 2018, Patricia de Lille announced that she would resign as Mayor of Cape Town, effective on 31 October 2018.

In September 2018, The Democratic Alliance selected Alan Winde as the party's Western Cape Premier candidate.

In October 2018, Patricia de Lille resigned as both Mayor of Cape Town and member of the Democratic Alliance. She was succeeded by her predecessor, Dan Plato. She subsequently founded a new political party named Good in December 2018. The party contested the 2019 elections both nationally and provincially.

On 6 November 2018, former Provincial Minister of Community Safety Dan Plato was elected Mayor of Cape Town on 6 November 2018 during a special council sitting, receiving 146 out of 202 valid votes. Six ballots were spoilt. The vote was held via secret ballot. His main challengers were Xolani Sotashe from the African National Congress and Grant Haskin from the African Christian Democratic Party. Sotashe received 53 votes while Haskin got 3 votes.

On 22 January 2019, the Freedom Front Plus announced that it had selected former premier of the Western Cape and mayor of Cape Town, Peter Marais, as its party premier candidate.

== Contesting parties and premier candidates ==
This is a list of political parties that the IEC presented on 20 March 2019 in the order that they appeared on the provincial ballot:

- African Christian Democratic Party
- African Content Movement
- African Covenant
- African Independent Congress
- African National Congress
- African People's Convention
- African Progressive Movement
- African Transformation Movement
- Al Jama-ah
- All Things Are Possible
- Alliance for Transformation for All
- Azanian People's Organisation
- Cape Party
- Congress of the People
- Democratic Alliance
- Dienslewerings Party
- Economic Freedom Fighters
- Forum for Service Delivery
- Free Democrats
- Good
- Green Party of South Africa
- Independent Civic Organisation of South Africa
- Inkatha Freedom Party
- Karoo Democratic Force
- Khoisan Revolution
- Land Party
- National Freedom Party
- New South Africa Party
- Pan Africanist Congress of Azania
- People's Republic of South Africa
- Plaaslike Besorgde Inwoners
- Socialist Revolutionary Workers Party
- United Democratic Movement
- Freedom Front Plus

=== Democratic Alliance ===
On 1 July 2018, the Democratic Alliance announced its list of candidates nominated for the position of premier. These candidates included:

- Fazloodien Abrahams, an attorney from Mitchells Plain
- Bonginkosi Madikizela, Democratic Alliance Provincial Leader, Provincial Minister of Human Settlements, Member of the Western Cape Provincial Parliament and former Provincial Minister of Housing
- David Maynier, Shadow Minister of Finance and Member of the National Assembly
- Kelly Baloyi, a student with a degree in political science
- Jacobus MacFarlane, an LL.B. law student, politician, businessman and human rights activist
- Alan Winde, Provincial Minister of Economic Opportunities, Member of the Western Cape Provincial Parliament and former Provincial Minister of Finance, Economic Development and Tourism
- Micheal Mack

On 19 September 2018, Democratic Alliance National Leader Mmusi Maimane announced Alan Winde as the party's premier candidate.

=== African National Congress ===
By January 2019, the provincial African National Congress had not announced its premier candidate or the list of candidates running to replace acting chairperson Khaya Magaxa. Here are a few candidates that were speculated to be contenders for both the positions of Provincial Chairperson and premier candidate:

- Ebrahim Rasool, Western Cape ANC Head of Elections, former South African Ambassador to the United States and former Premier of the Western Cape
- Cameron Dugmore, Member of the Western Cape Provincial Parliament, former Provincial Minister of Cultural Affairs and Sport and former Provincial Minister of Education
- Bongani Mkongi, Deputy Minister of Police and Member of the National Assembly of South Africa
- Pat Lekker, Member of the Western Cape Provincial Parliament

On 18 March 2019, the party's leadership announced that its provincial elective conference would be held after the 2019 elections. Provincial-Secretary Faiez Jacobs and acting Provincial Chairperson Khaya Magaxa both declared that they would not contest the elective conference.

On 25 April 2019, ANC Provincial Elections Head Ebrahim Rasool announced that the party would not field a premier candidate over concerns that it would divide the provincial party.

Soon after the provincial election, the African National Congress announced Cameron Dugmore as the Leader of the Opposition in the Western Cape Provincial Parliament and subsequent premier candidate. Dugmore lost to Alan Winde of the Democratic Alliance on 22 May 2019.

=== Economic Freedom Fighters ===
The Economic Freedom Fighters Leader Julius Malema announced on 2 February 2019 that the party would not field any premier candidates. City of Cape Town councillor Melikhaya Xego is the party's provincial chairperson. He was also first on the party's provincial parliament list.

=== African Christian Democratic Party ===
- Ferlon Christians, Member of the Western Cape Provincial Parliament and 2014 ACDP Western Cape Premier candidate

In February 2019, the party selected Christians as its premier candidate.

=== Freedom Front Plus ===
- Peter Marais, former mayor of Cape Town and former premier of the Western Cape

On 22 January 2019, the party announced that it had nominated Marais as its premier candidate.

=== Good ===
- Patricia de Lille, Leader of Good, former Mayor of Cape Town, former Provincial Leader of the Western Cape Democratic Alliance and former Leader of the Independent Democrats

On 10 February 2019, the party announced that it had nominated De Lille as its Western Cape Premier candidate.

=== Land Party ===
- Loyiso Nkohla, former African National Congress City of Cape Town councillor

On 26 February 2019, the Land Party selected Nkohla as the party's premier candidate.

== Opinion polling ==
Polling Organisation	Fieldwork Date	Sample Size	DA	ANC	EFF	Others	Don't Know	Lead
2019 General Election Results	8 May 2019	N/A	55.5	28.6	1.9	14	N/A	26.9
IRR	12 Feb 2019—26 Feb 2019	N/A	50.1	33.9	1.0	10.8	4.2	16.2
Afrobarometer	Aug—Sep 2018	N/A	31	23	3	5	39	8
Ipsos	20 Apr—7 Jun 2018	N/A	28	26	3	2	41	2
Ipsos	May 2017	430	47	20	3	2	28	27
2014 General Election Results	7 May 2014	N/A	59.4	32.9	2.1	5.6	N/A	26.5

== Results ==
Party	Votes	%	+/–	Seats	+/–
Democratic Alliance	1,140,647	55.45	–3.93	24	–2
African National Congress	589,055	28.63	–4.25	12	–2
Economic Freedom Fighters	83,075	4.04	+1.93	2	+1
Good	61,971	3.01	New	1	New
African Christian Democratic Party	54,762	2.66	+1.64	1	0
Freedom Front Plus	32,115	1.56	+1.01	1	+1
Al Jama-ah	17,607	0.86	+0.24	1	+1
Independent Civic Organisation	9,536	0.46	–0.10	0	0
Cape Party	9,331	0.45	New	0	New
Congress of the People	6,528	0.32	–0.27	0	0
Alliance for Transformation for All	6,175	0.30	New	0	New
Land Party	5,926	0.29	New	0	New
United Democratic Movement	5,728	0.28	–0.20	0	0
African Transformation Movement	4,953	0.24	New	0	New
Plaaslike Besorgde Inwoners	3,852	0.19	New	0	New
Pan Africanist Congress	3,845	0.19	+0.02	0	0
Socialist Revolutionary Workers Party	3,026	0.15	New	0	New
African Independent Congress	2,898	0.14	–0.17	0	0
Green Party	2,613	0.13	New	0	New
National Freedom Party	2,240	0.11	+0.07	0	0
Khoisan Revolution	1,854	0.09	New	0	New
Dienslewerings Party	1,703	0.08	New	0	New
Karoo Democratic Force	1,512	0.07	New	0	New
African Covenant	993	0.05	New	0	New
African People's Convention	915	0.04	–0.02	0	0
People's Republic of South Africa	710	0.03	New	0	New
Inkatha Freedom Party	599	0.03	–0.02	0	0
All Things Are Possible	556	0.03	New	0	New
African Progressive Movement	531	0.03	New	0	New
Azanian People's Organisation	475	0.02	–0.02	0	0
Free Democrats	470	0.02	New	0	New
New South Africa Party	444	0.02	New	0	New
Forum for Service Delivery	310	0.02	New	0	New
African Content Movement	257	0.01	New	0	New
Total	2,057,212	100.00	–	42	–
Valid votes	2,057,212	99.20			
Invalid/blank votes	16,516	0.80			
Total votes	2,073,728	100.00			
Registered voters/turnout	3,128,567	66.28			
Source: Election Resources

== Aftermath ==
Despite losing two seats, the DA retained its majority in parliament, and Winde took office as premier of the province.
