= 1999 Western Cape provincial election =

The 1999 Western Cape provincial election was held on 2 June 1999, concurrently with the 1999 South African general election, to elect the 2nd Western Cape Provincial Parliament.

The election resulted in no overall control of the Provincial Parliament, but brought the African National Congress to a plurality of seats at the expense of the New National Party, as well as gains for the Democratic Party. Despite the result, the NNP formed a coalition with the DP, and incumbent Gerald Morkel remained premier.

== Background ==
In the previous election, the National Party gained the majority of seats in the 1st Western Cape Provincial Parliament, with Hernus Kriel, who previously served as the Minister of Law and Order in the South African government under Frederik Willem de Klerk, becoming the first premier of the new province. Kriel served as premier and provincial leader of the National Party until 1998, when he was succeeded by Gerald Morkel, who led the party in the 1999 provincial election.

== Results ==
Party	Votes	%	Seats	+/–
African National Congress	668,106	42.07	18	+4
New National Party	609,612	38.39	17	−6
Democratic Party	189,183	11.91	5	+2
African Christian Democratic Party	44,323	2.79	1	0
United Democratic Movement	38,071	2.40	1	New
Africa Moral Party	9,513	0.60	0	0
Pan Africanist Congress	7,708	0.49	0	0
Freedom Front	6,394	0.40	0	−1
Federal Alliance	4,153	0.26	0	New
Inkatha Freedom Party	2,895	0.18	0	0
Afrikaner Eenheidsbeweging	2,854	0.18	0	New
Government by the People Green Party	2,453	0.15	0	0
National Coalition Party	1,126	0.07	0	New
People's Liberation Party	915	0.06	0	New
Workers International Vanguard League	672	0.04	0	0
Total	1,587,978	100.00	42	0
Valid votes	1,587,978	99.16		
Invalid/blank votes	13,499	0.84		
Total votes	1,601,477	100.00		
Registered voters/turnout	1,864,019	85.92		
Source: Election Resources

== Aftermath ==
The election resulted in no party obtaining a majority in the Provincial Parliament. The NNP formed a coalition with the smaller Democratic Party, with Morkel remaining as premier. In 2000, plans began to prepare an amalgamation of the two parties under the name Democratic Alliance. However, in 2001, the NNP leadership pulled out of its co-operation with the DA and instead sought to form a partnership with the African National Congress. Morkel was deeply critical of this decision and attempted to turn the majority of the NNP against it. When this failed, he was forced to resign as premier. He was succeeded by Peter Marais as leader of the NNP and was elected Premier of the Western Cape on 5 December 2001.

Marais served until his resignation on 3 June 2002 amid allegations of sexual harassment. Marais was then succeeded by Marthinus van Schalkwyk as leader of the NNP and premier. During the 2003 floor-crossing period four members of the provincial parliament crossed to the ANC, giving it an absolute majority of 22 seats in the 42-seat house. However, the ANC remained in coalition with the NNP and van Schalkwyk remained as Premier heading into the 2009 provincial election.
