= Director-General of the Provincial Government of the Western Cape =

Senior non-political official

The Director-General of the Provincial Government of the Western Cape is the senior non-political official of the Provincial Government of the Western Cape province of South Africa. The Director-General is head of the Office of the Premier of the Western Cape.

== List of Directors-General ==
- Neil Barnard
- Peter Marais acting
- Gilbert Lawrence acting, later official (2002–2007)
- Virginia Petersen acting (2007-)
