= 1994 Western Cape provincial election =

The 1994 Western Cape provincial election was held between 26 and 29 April 1994 to elect the 1st Western Cape Provincial Parliament. Running concurrently with the 1994 South African general election, the provincial elections were the first in which citizens of all races were allowed to take part, and were therefore also the first held with universal suffrage. The election was conducted under the direction of the Independent Electoral Commission (IEC), and marked the culmination of the four-year process that ended apartheid.

The National Party won the majority of seats in the Western Cape Provincial Parliament. Unlike the results across seven of South Africa's provinces, Western Cape was one of the two provinces in which the African National Congress was elected to opposition status, the other being KwaZulu-Natal.

== Results ==
Party	Votes	%	Seats
National Party	1,138,242	53.25	23
African National Congress	705,576	33.01	14
Democratic Party	141,970	6.64	3
Freedom Front	44,003	2.06	1
African Christian Democratic Party	25,731	1.20	1
Pan Africanist Congress	22,676	1.06	0
Africa Muslim Party	20,954	0.98	0
Islamic Party	16,762	0.78	0
Inkatha Freedom Party	7,445	0.35	0
Wes-Kaap Federaliste Party	6,337	0.30	0
South African Women's Party	2,641	0.12	0
Green Party	2,611	0.12	0
African Democratic Movement	1,939	0.09	0
Workers International to Rebuild the Fourth International	855	0.04	0
Total	2,137,742	100.00	42
Valid votes	2,137,742	99.50	
Invalid/blank votes	10,714	0.50	
Total votes	2,148,456	100.00	
Source: Election Resources

== Aftermath ==
The National Party gained the majority of seats in the Western Cape Provincial Parliament, with Hernus Kriel, who previously served as the Minister of Law and Order in the South African government under Frederik Willem de Klerk, becoming the first premier of the new province. Kriel served as premier and provincial leader of the National Party until 1998, when he was succeeded by Gerald Morkel, who led the party in the 1999 provincial election.
