= 2014 Western Cape provincial election =

← 2009	7 May 2014	2019 →

All 42 seats to the Western Cape Provincial Parliament 22 seats needed for a majority
- Turnout: 72.76% ▼2.74%
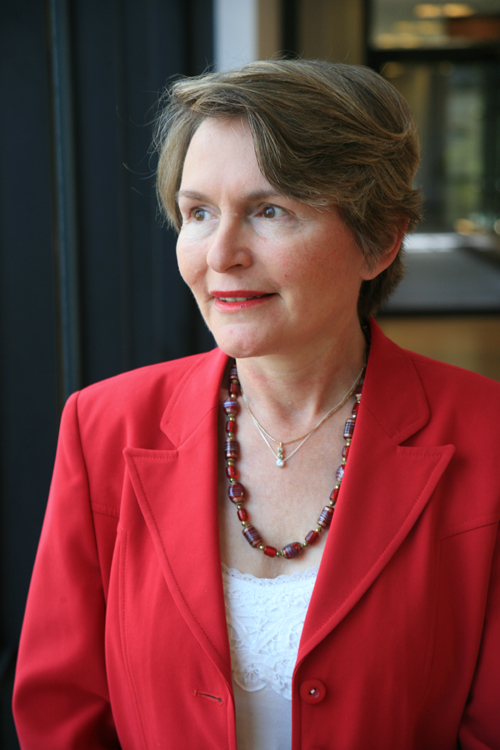

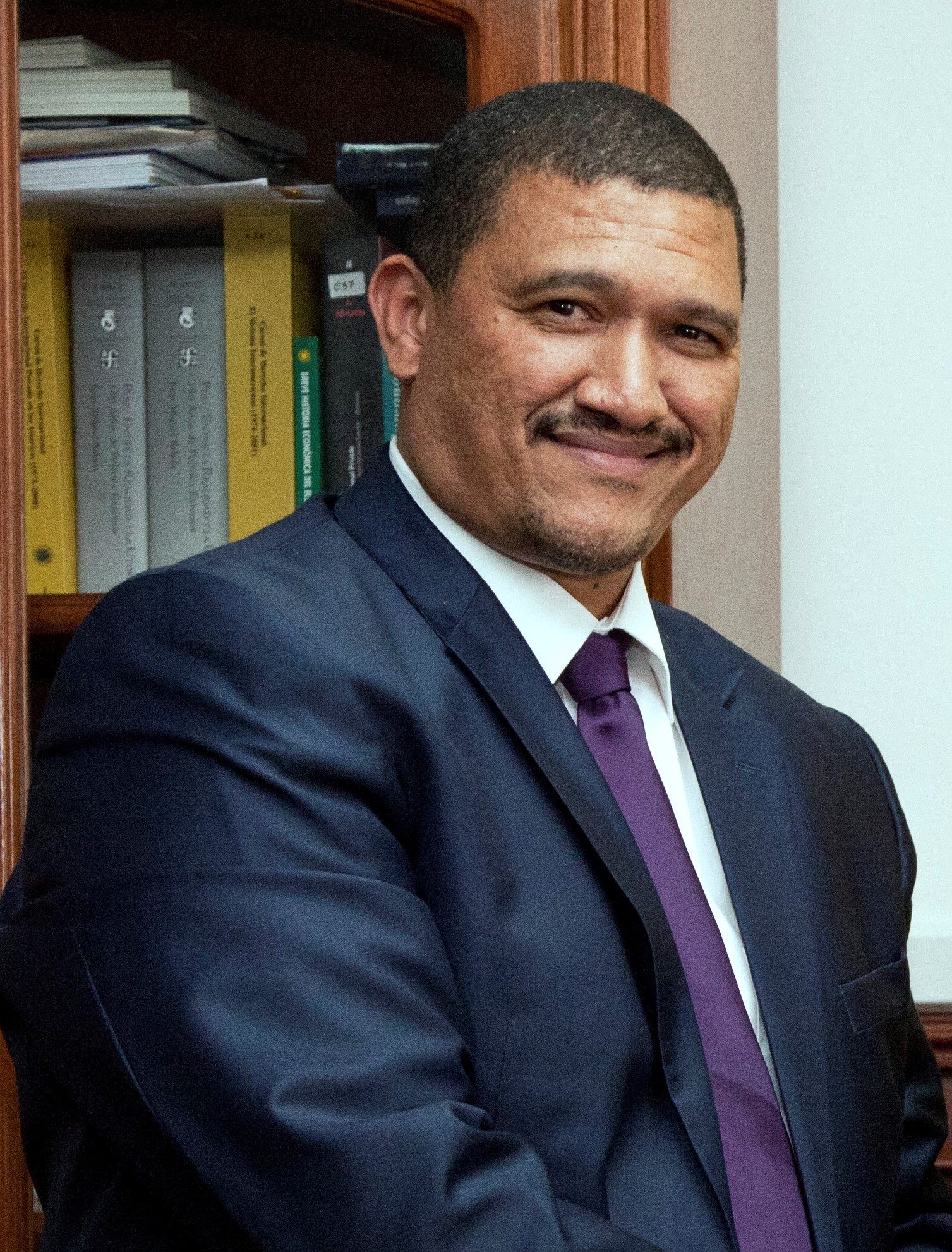
	First party	Second party	Third party
			EFF
Candidate	Helen Zille	Marius Fransman	Nazier Paulsen
Party	DA	ANC	EFF
Last election	22 seats, 51.46%	14 seats, 31.55%	-
Seats before	22	14	-
Seats won	26	14	1
Seat change	▲4	Steady	New party
Popular vote	1,259,645	697,664	44,762
Percentage	59.38%	32.89%	2.1%
Swing	▲7.92	▲1.34	New party
- Map showing the winning party by ward.
Premier before election
Helen Zille
Democratic Alliance
Elected Premier
Helen Zille
Democratic Alliance

A provincial election was held in the Western Cape on 7 May 2014 to elect a new provincial parliament. It was the fifth provincial election held since the end of the apartheid era, and also the first held since the death of Nelson Mandela. Although not constitutionally required, the election was held simultaneously with elections to the National Assembly. The legislature is unicameral, and consists of 42 members elected by a system of party-list proportional representation.

The Western Cape calls its legislature the "Provincial Parliament" and the members "Members of Provincial Parliament (MPPs)". The other provinces use the terms "Provincial Legislature" and "Members of the Provincial Legislature".

The Premier of the Western Cape is chosen by the Provincial Parliament. The incumbent Premier Helen Zille was re-elected.

== Results ==
The Western Cape was the only province not won by the ANC, the DA increased its majority from 51.46% to 59.38%. The African National Congress came in second with 32.89% of the vote, while the newly formed Economic Freedom Fighters obtained 2.1%. The African Christian Democratic Party gained 1.02% of the vote.

Party	Votes	%	Seats	+/–
Democratic Alliance	1,259,645	59.38	26	+2
African National Congress	697,664	32.89	14	0
Economic Freedom Fighters	44,762	2.11	1	New
African Christian Democratic Party	21,696	1.02	1	0
Al Jama-ah	13,182	0.62	0	0
Congress of the People	12,520	0.59	0	–3
Independent Civic Organisation	11,949	0.56	0	New
Freedom Front Plus	11,587	0.55	0	0
United Democratic Movement	10,199	0.48	0	0
Patriotic Alliance	8,510	0.40	0	New
African Independent Congress	6,508	0.31	0	New
Agang South Africa	6,398	0.30	0	New
Pan Africanist Congress	3,591	0.17	0	0
National Party	2,694	0.13	0	0
African People's Convention	1,291	0.06	0	0
African National Party	1,249	0.06	0	New
Indigenous Peoples Organisation	1,180	0.06	0	New
United Christian Democratic Party	1,158	0.05	0	0
Inkatha Freedom Party	1,078	0.05	0	0
Azanian People's Organisation	844	0.04	0	0
National Freedom Party	763	0.04	0	New
South African Progressive Civic Organisation	642	0.03	0	New
First Nation Liberation Alliance	635	0.03	0	New
Kingdom Governance Movement	490	0.02	0	New
Sibanye Civic Association	478	0.02	0	New
Peoples Alliance	440	0.02	0	New
Total	2,121,153	100.00	42	0
Valid votes	2,121,153	99.12		
Invalid/blank votes	18,937	0.88		
Total votes	2,140,090	100.00		
Registered voters/turnout	2,941,333	72.76		
Source: Election Resources
