= Richard Majola =

South African politician

Member of the National Assembly of South Africa
- In office 21 May 2014 – 7 March 2024

Speaker of the Western Cape Provincial Parliament
- In office 23 February 2012 – 6 May 2014
- Deputy: Piet Pretorius
- Preceded by: Shahid Esau
- Succeeded by: Sharna Fernandez

Member of the Western Cape Provincial Parliament
- In office 6 May 2009 – 6 May 2014

Personal details
- Born: Thembekile Richard Majola
- Party: UMkhonto we Sizwe (2024–present)
- Other political affiliations: Democratic Alliance (Until 2024)
- Occupation: Member of Parliament
- Profession: Politician

Thembekile Richard Majola is a South African politician who served as a Member of the National Assembly of South Africa for the Democratic Alliance (DA) from 2014 until his resignation from the party in 2024. He was the deputy speaker of the Western Cape Provincial Parliament from 2009 to 2012 and the speaker from 2012 to 2014.

In May 2019, the DA parliamentary caucus nominated Majola to be the party's candidate for National Assembly. He lost to the ANC's Thandi Modise after receiving only 83 votes compared to Modise's 250 votes. He was elected as a member of the Pan-African Parliament in June.

On 7 March 2024, Majola resigned from the DA after failing to be included on any of the party's lists for the general elections on 29 May 2024. He subsequently joined UMkhonto we Sizwe (MK).
