= Shaun Byneveldt =

South African diplomat and politician

South African Ambassador to Palestine
- Incumbent
- Assumed office 2018

South African Ambassador to Syria
- In office 2010–2018
- Succeeded by: Barry Gilder

Speaker of the Western Cape Provincial Parliament
- In office 2004–2009
- Preceded by: Lynne Brown
- Succeeded by: Shahid Esau

Personal details
- Born: Shaun Edward Byneveldt
- Party: African National Congress
- Profession: Diplomat; Politician

Shaun Edward Byneveldt is a South African diplomat and politician who is the current South African ambassador to the State of Palestine. Previously, he served as the South African Ambassador to Syria from 2010 to 2018. He was the Speaker of the Western Cape Provincial Parliament from 2004 to 2009. Byneveldt is a member of the African National Congress (ANC).

On 30 January 2026, Byneveldt was declared persona non grata and given 72 hours to leave the country by the Israeli government, in retaliation for the South African Department of International Relations and Cooperation declaring Israel’s Chargé d'affaires to South Africa, Ariel Shiedman, persona non grata. Despite Byneveldt being the ambassador to the State of Palestine, his accreditation required coordination via Israel due to the latter's ongoing occupation of the West Bank.

Diplomatic posts
Unknown	South African Ambassador to Syria; 2010 – 2018	Succeeded by Barry Gilder
Political offices
Preceded by Lynne Brown	Speaker of the Western Cape Provincial Parliament; 2004 – 2009	Succeeded by Shahid Esau
