= Pat Lekker =

South African politician

Pat Lekker MPP

Chief Whip of the Official Opposition
- Incumbent
- Assumed office 22 May 2019
- Leader: Cameron Dugmore
- Preceded by: Pierre Uys

Member of the Western Cape Provincial Parliament
- Incumbent
- Assumed office 21 May 2014
- Constituency: Philippi

Personal details
- Party: African National Congress
- Occupation: Politician

Patronella Zingisa "Pat" Lekker is a South Africa politician. A member of the African National Congress, she is currently serving as the Chief Whip of the Official Opposition in the Western Cape Provincial Parliament.

== Life and career ==
Born in Cape Town, Lekker still currently resides in Cape Town. She graduated from Sizamile Secondary. She is well known in the ANC's Dullah Omar region.

Lekker was elected to the Western Cape Provincial Parliament in 2014 and took office as a Member on 21 May 2014. She represents the Philippi township of the City of Cape Town metropolitan municipality in the provincial parliament.

For the Fifth Provincial Parliament, she served as a Member of the Standing Committee on Community Safety. She was also an Alternate Member of the Standing Committees on Community Development and Transport and Public Works.

For the 2019 elections, she was first on the party's provincial parliament candidate list. After the election, Lekker was named chief whip of the official opposition.

Lekker was re-elected to the Provincial Parliament at the 2024 provincial election.
