= Constitution of the Western Cape =

Constitution of the Western Cape, 1997

Western Cape Provincial Legislature
- Citation: Act No. 1 of 1998 (Western Cape)
- Territorial extent: Western Cape
- Enacted by: Western Cape Provincial Legislature
- Assented to: 15 January 1998
- Commenced: 16 January 1998
- Status: In force

The Constitution of the Western Cape is, subject to the Constitution of South Africa, the highest law regulating the structure and powers of the government of the Western Cape province of South Africa. It was enacted by the Western Cape Provincial Legislature in terms of Chapter 6 of the national constitution, and came into force on 16 January 1998. The Western Cape is the only South African province to have adopted a constitution.

== History ==
The current nine provinces of South Africa were created by the Interim Constitution, which was drawn up during the negotiations to end apartheid. The Interim Constitution included provisions for a provincial legislature to adopt a provincial constitution by a two-thirds vote, but none was successfully adopted under its terms. (A proposed constitution for KwaZulu-Natal was rejected by the Constitutional Court in 1996.) The final (and current) national constitution includes similar provisions, which allow a provincial legislature to adopt a provincial constitution by the vote of two thirds of its members.

The process of drawing up a provincial constitution for the Western Cape was initiated in July 1996 by Premier Hernus Kriel, and the final national constitution was still under negotiation. The bill to enact the new constitution was passed by the Provincial Legislature on 21 February 1997 and referred to the Constitutional Court, which determined whether it was consistent with the national constitution, which had come into effect on 4 February.

The Constitutional Court rejected a number of clauses, but the main objection was a provision that provided for members of the provincial parliament to be elected from multiple-member geographical constituencies, as opposed to the party-list proportional representation prescribed by the national constitution. The national constitution allows provincial constitutions to contain different "legislative or executive structures and procedures", but the court ruled that an electoral system was not a "legislative structure" and that the province did not have the power to vary the electoral system. The court also objected to provisions that placed the responsibility for administering provincial oaths of office on the Judge President of the Western Cape High Court, rather than the President of the Constitutional Court. As judges are national officials, the provincial legislature did not have the power to alter their responsibilities.

The constitution was referred to the provincial legislature to correct the impermissible sections. An amended bill was passed on 11 September 1997, certified by the Constitutional Court on 18 November 1997, signed by the premier on 15 January 1998 and came into effect on the following day.

== Contents ==
The Constitution of the Western Cape consists of a preamble, 11 chapters containing a total of 84 sections, and three schedules. Many of the provisions of the Western Cape constitution restate the corresponding provisions of the national constitution (in particular chapter six, which deals with provincial government), and therefore this section describes primarily those cases where the provincial constitution differs from or adds to the national constitution.

The provincial constitution declares Afrikaans, English and isiXhosa to be the official languages of the province; the 2011 census found that 95% of the province's population speaks one of these as a first language.

The Western Cape constitution names the legislature the "provincial parliament", while in other provinces it is known as the "provincial legislature". The number of members of the parliament is also fixed at 42, whereas the size of other provincial legislatures is determined by the Independent Electoral Commission by a formula based on provincial population. Where in other provinces the provincial executive power is vested in a Premier and an Executive Council consisting of MECs appointed by the Premier, in the Western Cape the Premier appoints a Provincial Cabinet whose members are referred to as Provincial Ministers.

The provincial constitution provides for the creation of "cultural councils" to represent cultural and linguistic communities within the province. It also requires the appointment of a Commissioner for the Environment to oversee environmental conservation, and a Commissioner for Children to guard the interests of children. It lists a number of "directive principles" which are intended to guide the policy of the provincial government, but are not legally enforceable.
