= Grant Marais =

South African politician and former banker

Grant Marais MPP

Member of the Western Cape Provincial Parliament
- Incumbent
- Assumed office 13 June 2024

Personal details
- Party: Freedom Front Plus (2018–present)
- Relations: Peter Marais (father)

Grant Peter Marais (born 25 January 1974) is a South African politician and former banker who has served as a Member of the Western Cape Provincial Parliament since June 2024, representing the Freedom Front Plus.

== Background ==
Marais was born in 1974 to Cape political stalwart Peter Marais. He matriculated in 1992 and obtained a NQR level 6 qualification in Wealth Management and Investments at the Gordon Institute of Business Science. Marais then proceeded to have a career in banking, working as the branch manager and manager of African Bank's insurance division in Atlantis and then as the public relations manager of ABSA at the Tyger Valley Shopping Centre in Bellville. In 2024, it was reported that Marais was a final-year law student at the University of South Africa.

== Political career ==
Marais joined the Bruin Bemagtiging Beweging (English: Brown Empowerment Movement) (BBB) in 2013. In November 2018, he became a member of the Freedom Front Plus.

Marais was the Freedom Front Plus's ward councillor candidate for ward 105 in the City of Cape Town in the 2021 local government elections. He did not win the ward but was elected to the Cape Town City Council from the party list.

In May 2024, Marais was elected deputy provincial chairperson of the Freedom Front Plus following Lennit Max's departure from the party. He was elected to the Western Cape Provincial Parliament in the provincial election that was held later that month; he succeeded his father as the Freedom Front Plus's sole representative in the legislature.
