= Khaya Magaxa =

South African politician

Chairperson of the Portfolio Committee on Public Enterprises
- In office 2 July 2019 – 28 May 2024
- Preceded by: Lungi Mnganga-Gcabashe
- Succeeded by: Position abolsihed

Member of the National Assembly of South Africa
- In office 22 May 2019 – 28 May 2024

Leader of the Opposition in the Western Cape Provincial Parliament
- In office 16 February 2016 – 7 May 2019
- Premier: Helen Zille
- Preceded by: Marius Fransman
- Succeeded by: Cameron Dugmore

Member of the Western Cape Provincial Parliament
- In office 21 May 2014 – 7 May 2019

Personal details
- Born: Khayalethu Elvis Magaxa; 29 January 1964 (age 62)
- Party: African National Congress
- Profession: Politician

Khayalethu Elvis "Khaya" Magaxa (born 29 January 1964) is a South African politician who was Chairperson of the Portfolio Committee on Public Enterprises and a Member of the National Assembly of South Africa for the African National Congress (ANC). He became an MP in May 2019. Magaxa was elected as a Member of the Western Cape Provincial Parliament in 2014, and served as the Leader of the Opposition from 2016 to 2019. He was the acting provincial chair of the ANC in the Western Cape from 2016 to 2019.

Magaxa was ranked too low on the ANC's list to secure re-election in 2024.
