= Alan Winde =

8th Premier of the Western Cape (born 1965)

The Honourable Alan Winde MPP
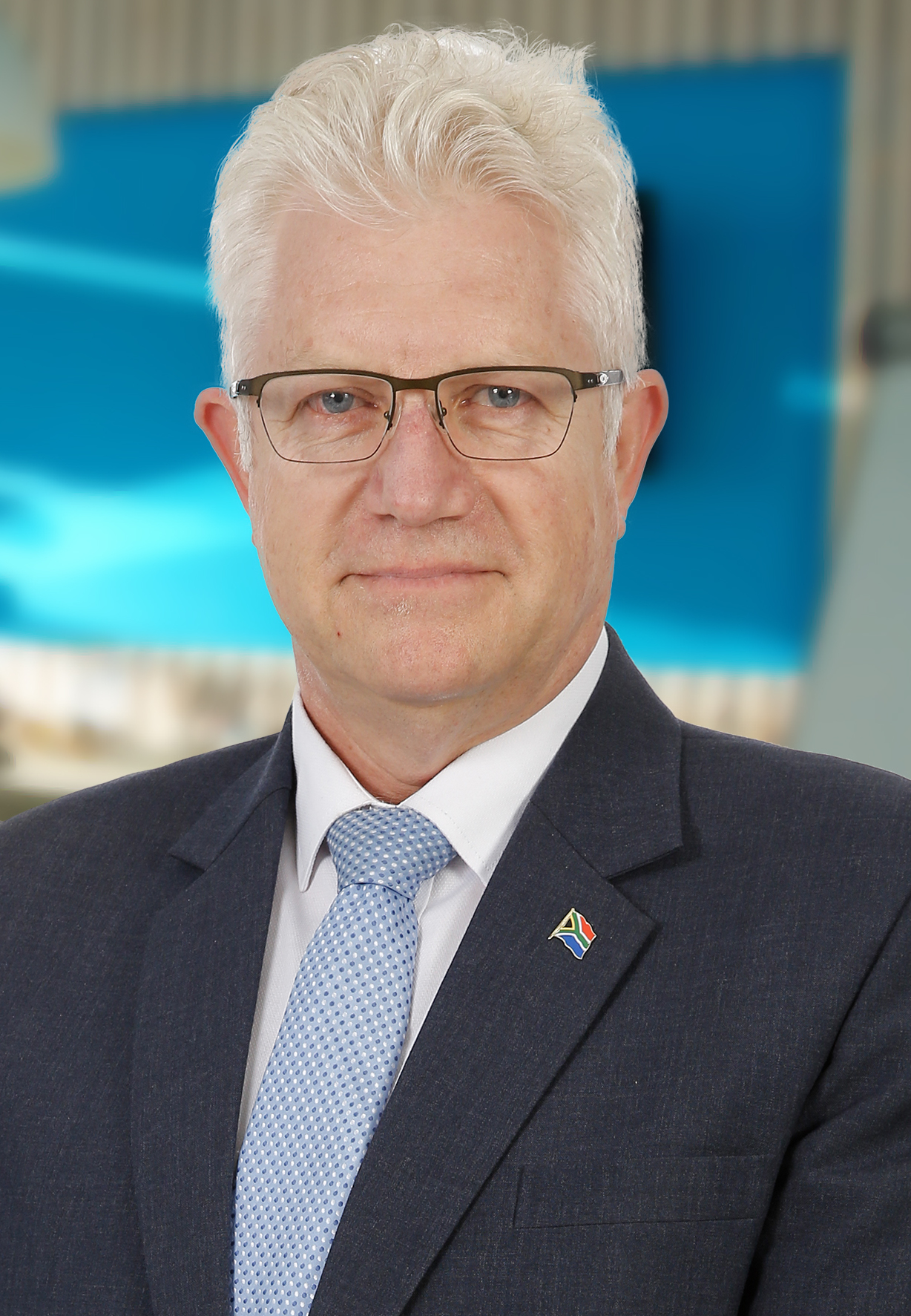
- Winde in 2018

8th Premier of the Western Cape
- Incumbent
- Assumed office 22 May 2019
- Preceded by: Helen Zille

Western Cape Provincial Minister of Community Safety
- In office 1 November 2018 – 22 May 2019
- Premier: Helen Zille
- Preceded by: Dan Plato
- Succeeded by: Albert Fritz

Western Cape Provincial Minister of Economic Opportunities
- In office 26 May 2014 – 1 November 2018
- Premier: Helen Zille
- Preceded by: Position established
- Succeeded by: Beverley Schäfer

Western Cape Provincial Minister of Finance, Economic Development and Tourism
- In office 7 May 2009 – 26 May 2014
- Premier: Helen Zille
- Preceded by: Garth Strachan
- Succeeded by: Position dissolved

Member of the Western Cape Provincial Parliament
- Incumbent
- Assumed office 15 June 1999

Personal details
- Born: Alan Richard Winde; 18 March 1965 (age 61) Knysna, Cape Province, South Africa
- Party: Democratic Alliance (2000–present)
- Other political affiliations: Democratic Party (1999–2000); Independent (Before 1999)
- Spouse: Tracy Winde (m. 1993)
- Children: 2
- Education: Knysna High School
- Profession: Politician; Businessman

Alan Richard Winde (born 18 March 1965) is a South African politician and businessman. He is the 8th and current Premier of the Western Cape, having held the position since 2019. He has been a Member of the Western Cape Provincial Parliament since 1999 and belongs to the Democratic Alliance.

Born in Knysna, Winde attended Knysna High School. He established small businesses in his hometown. He started his political career as a municipal and district councillor in the early 1990s. Shortly afterwards in 1999, he was elected to the Western Cape Provincial Parliament. He has held various leadership positions in the Democratic Alliance provincial parliament caucus. Winde was appointed Provincial Minister of Finance, Economic Development and Tourism in May 2009 and served until May 2014, when he assumed the post of Provincial Minister of Economic Opportunities.

In September 2018, the Democratic Alliance selected Winde to be the party's Western Cape Premier candidate. In October 2018, Premier Helen Zille appointed Winde to the post of Provincial Minister of Community Safety. He took office on 1 November 2018. On 8 May 2019, the Democratic Alliance retained their majority in the Western Cape Provincial Parliament, but with a decrease in the number of seats. Winde was elected Premier on 22 May 2019, succeeding Zille. He is the second Western Cape Premier from the Democratic Alliance.

== Early life and business career ==
Alan Richard Winde was born on 18 March 1965 in Knysna to Ingrid and William Dave Winde. He attended and matriculated from Knysna High School. Winde started many small businesses that specialised in printing, selling bicycles, courier services and boat parts in Knysna. He later worked as a business consultant for Aldes Business Brokers, a South African Top 100 Company.

== Political career ==
=== Early political career ===
Winde ran as an independent candidate and was elected to the South Cape District Council in 1996. He had previously served as a councillor for the Outeniqua Rural Council.

Shortly after being elected a district councillor, the Democratic Party recruited him to be a candidate for the Western Cape Provincial Parliament. He was elected in the 1999 general election. He was sworn in as a Member on 15 June 2009.

During his first term, he served as Western Cape Provincial Finance Chairman and a Member of the executive committee. He returned to the Provincial Parliament following the 2004 general election. Briefly, before being re-elected in 2009, he served as Chief Whip of the Official Opposition, Party Spokesperson on Environment and Planning and Deputy Party Spokesperson on Economic Development and Tourism.

=== Provincial ministerships ===
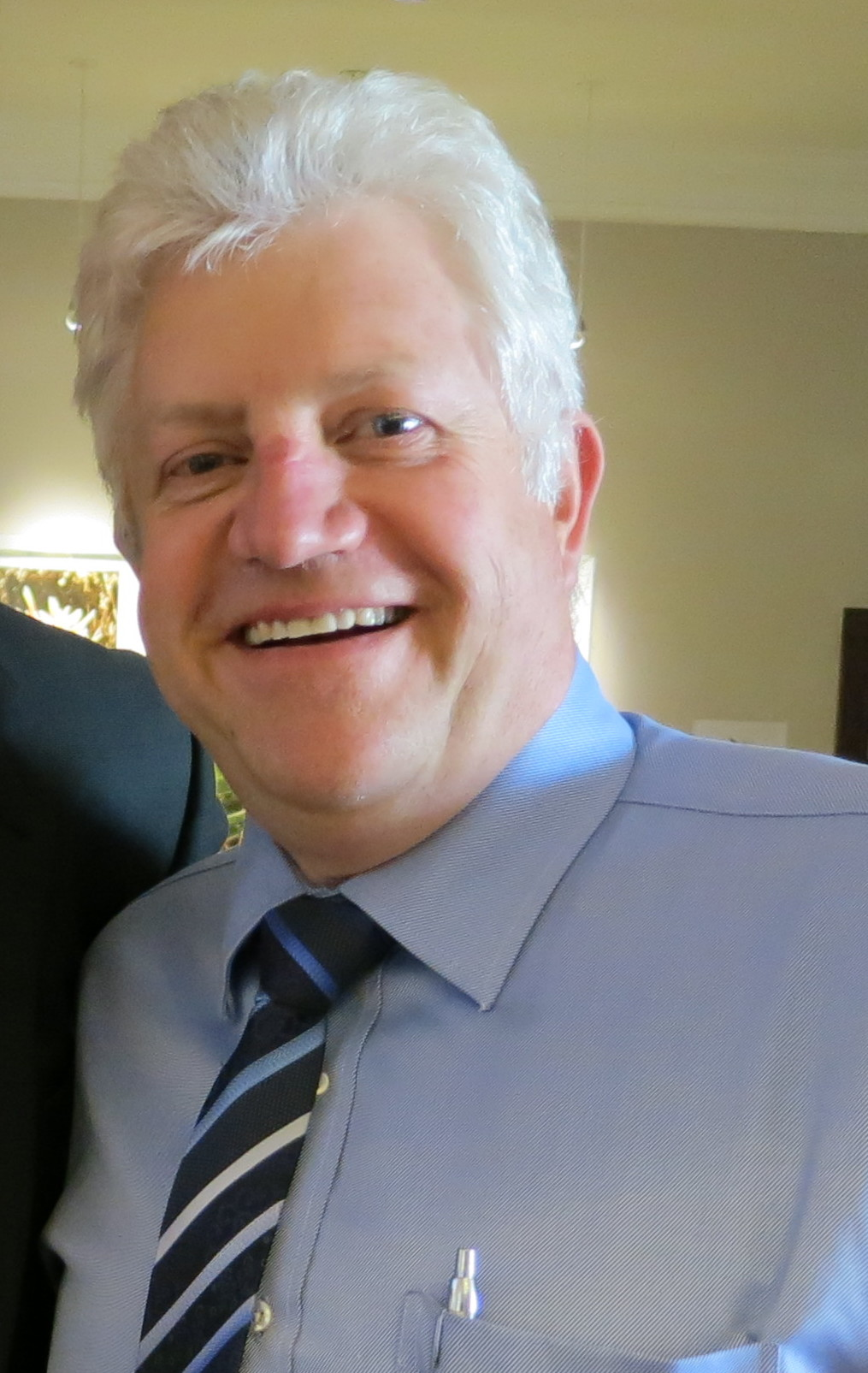
Winde as Provincial Minister of Finance, Economic Development and Tourism in 2013

Premier Helen Zille appointed Winde to the position of Provincial Minister of Finance, Economic Development and Tourism following his re-election in May 2009. Constitutional Court Judge Yvonne Mokgoro swore him in as Provincial Minister on 7 May 2009. He consequently succeeded Garth Strachan.

During his tenure, he criticised immigration regulations introduced by the national government, which he alleged had harmed tourism growth in the Western Cape, and organised petitions against the regulations.

After the 2014 election, Zille announced that Winde would now hold the title of Provincial Minister of Economic Opportunities and only lead the Provincial Departments of Agriculture, Economic Development and Tourism. The Provincial Finance Department would be an independent department with its own Provincial Minister. Western Cape Deputy Judge President Jeanette Traverso swore him in on 26 May 2014.

As Provincial Minister of Economic Opportunities, Winde announced in 2017 that during the First Thursday event in Cape Town, the provincial government would host talk shops where people could directly speak with government officials. During the drought that ravaged the Western Cape province from 2017 to 2018, he argued for farmers to keep hold of their private agricultural water supply, even when their local municipalities had a shortage of water.

Zille announced in October 2018 that Winde would move to the Provincial Community Safety Department as incumbent Provincial Minister Dan Plato had announced his intention to resign. Winde was succeeded by Beverley Schäfer on 1 November 2018. He subsequently assumed the post of Provincial Minister of Community Safety.

Winde has served as acting Premier of the Western Cape on various brief occasions when Zille was unavailable. In February 2019, Zille was in Germany, and so Winde was sworn in as acting premier. He consequently represented the provincial government at the State of the Nation Address held in the same month.

== Premier of the Western Cape ==
=== 2019 electoral campaign ===
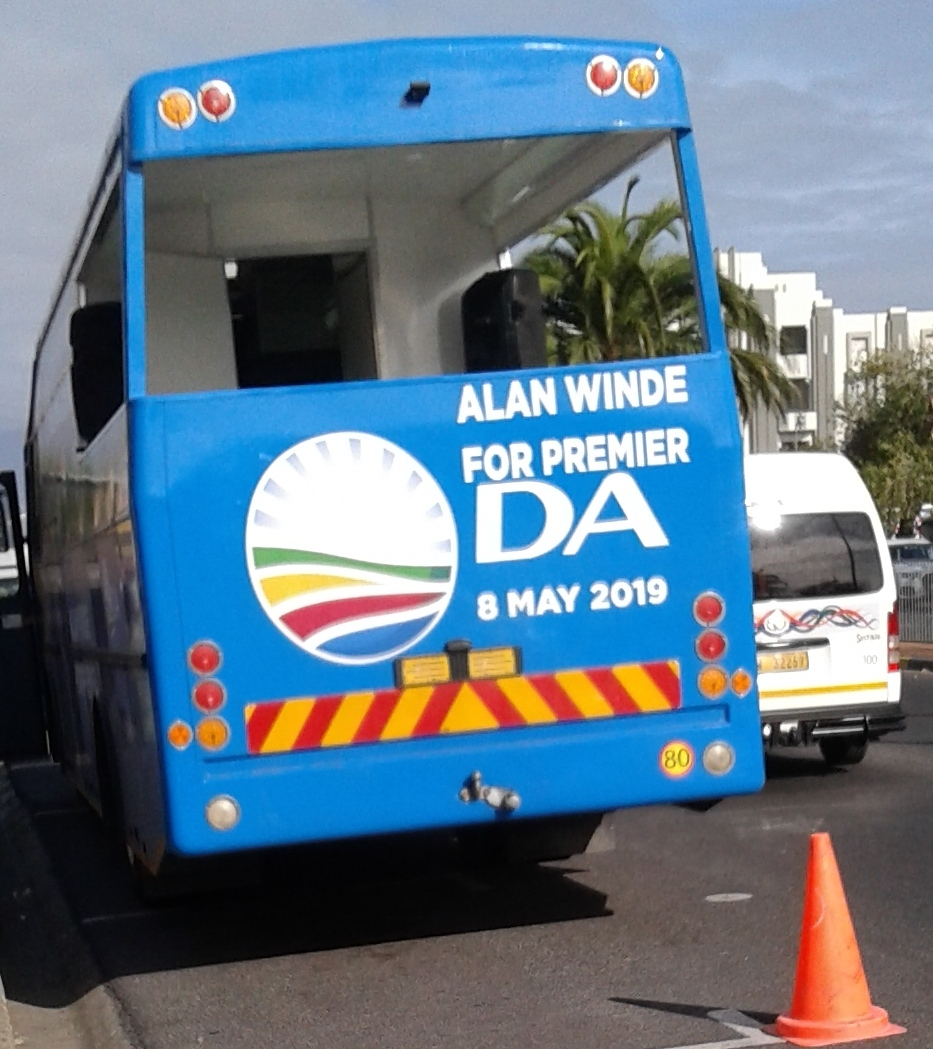
Alan Winde for Premier campaign bus, which was unveiled in April 2019.

Winde emerged as the front-runner quite early on in the Democratic Alliance selection process for the party's candidate for Western Cape Premier. On 19 September 2018, Democratic Alliance Federal Leader, Mmusi Maimane, announced Winde as the party's candidate to succeed Zille after the 2019 elections. Winde defeated prominent candidates such as the Provincial Leader of the Democratic Alliance in the Western Cape, Bonginkosi Madikizela, and Member of Parliament David Maynier in an internal party vote. The Democratic Alliance won a majority in the Western Cape Provincial Parliament, but with a decrease in the number of seats, on 8 May 2019.

=== First term as premier ===
Winde was elected Premier of the Western Cape on 22 May 2019 during the first sitting of the Sixth Provincial Parliament and accordingly became the second Democratic Alliance member to hold the office. He received 24 out of the 34 valid votes. Six ballots were spoilt, and there were two abstentions. His main challenger for the post was Cameron Dugmore of the African National Congress, who received 10 out of the 34 valid votes.

Winde announced the formation of his Provincial Cabinet on 23 May 2019. He retained four ministers in their existing portfolios, while he moved three to other portfolios and appointed three new members. He appointed former DA Member of Parliament and premier candidate contender, David Maynier, to the post of Provincial Minister of Finance and Economic Opportunities, while he moved Albert Fritz and Ivan Meyer to the posts of Provincial Minister of Community Safety and Provincial Minister of Agriculture, respectively. Winde also said that all the newly appointed cabinet members would undergo lifestyle audits.

National Police Minister Bheki Cele announced on 11 July 2019, that the South African National Defence Force (SANDF) would be deployed in the gang-ridden areas of Cape Town. Winde welcomed the deployment of SANDF. His predecessor, Helen Zille, had repeatedly asked for the deployment of SANDF during her tenure. The deployment came into effect on 18 July 2019 and was set to end on 16 September 2019. However, Winde wrote to President Cyril Ramaphosa and Defence Minister Nosiviwe Mapisa-Nqakula in mid-September 2019 to request that the SANDF deployment in Cape Town be extended, stating that it was necessary to bring stability. The cabinet granted the request and the deployment ended in March 2020.

Winde delivered his maiden State of the Province Address on 18 July 2019, in which he highlighted the provincial government's achievements and outlined his agenda. Also in the speech, Winde placed emphasis on the provincial crime and misconduct statistics and claimed that the police "had lost the war on crime" because of mismanagement.

Winde and Provincial Minister of Community Safety Albert Fritz announced on 19 September 2019 that the provincial government would annually be investing R1 billion (US$67.3 million) for three years into the training and deployment of 3,000 safety officers and 150 investigators. A total of 500 safety officers were deployed in February 2020. The safety plan aims to halve the province's crime statistics within the next decade. Fritz added that the provincial government would also establish an integrated violence prevention programme.

On 22 October 2019, he appointed Harry Malila as the new Director-General of the Western Cape Provincial Government. Malila succeeded long-serving Brent Gerber.

On 22 October 2021, Public Protector Busisiwe Mkhwebane found that Winde and the Provincial Minister of Local Government, Environmental Affairs and Development Planning, Anton Bredell, had breached the Executive Ethics Code over their handling of issues at the Oudtshoorn Local Municipality.

In his capacity as a member of the Judicial Service Commission, Winde voted on 25 July 2022 to recommend that the Judge President of the Western Cape High Court, John Hlophe, be suspended by President Ramaphosa for gross misconduct.

In the wake of the International Criminal Court's arrest warrant for Russian president Vladimir Putin, Winde criticised President Ramaphosa in a statement on 27 April 2023 for inviting Putin to South Africa for the upcoming BRICS summit in August 2023 and said that he would instruct the provincial Law Enforcement Advancement Plan (LEAP) officers to arrest Putin "if he sets foot in the Western Cape".

==== COVID-19 response ====
On 11 March 2020, the first COVID-19 case was confirmed in the Western Cape. Winde and the provincial minister of health, Nomafrench Mbombo, then organised a media briefing about the province's preparedness. The provincial cabinet approved the request for the establishment of a provincial hotline to assist the National Institute for Communicable Diseases hotline and also resolved that all people returning from overseas should be advised to self-isolate.

Winde was exposed to a positive case of COVID-19 on 18 March 2020. He consequently worked from home as medical experts advised him not to go into self-isolation or be tested. As positive cases in the province started to climb, Winde released daily detailed updates on the spread of the virus. On 13 May, Winde announced that he would self-quarantine after his contact with eNCA cameraman Lungile Tom, who interviewed Winde days before he died from the virus. On 8 July, in the midst of the province's "first wave" of infections, Winde announced that he had tested positive for COVID-19, and would be self-isolating.

As the province began to experience its "second wave" of infections in early-December 2020, Winde said that there should be harsher penalties for people who violate the regulations. Winde and the provincial government mulled introducing "mini lockdowns" on certain district municipalities and local municipalities, but the newly elected DA leader, John Steenhuisen, said that there was "no evidence" that lockdowns work. Winde later said that he would argue against a stricter lockdown being imposed on the Western Cape as a whole. On 24 December 2020, Winde urged all religious gatherings in the province to not be held in-person. He formally requested tighter restrictions on 28 December, but again distanced himself from the idea of a hard lockdown. President Ramaphosa announced on the same day that liquor sales would again be suspended until further notice. Winde welcomed the decision. Winde said on 20 January 2021 that the first two weeks of the suspension had cost the Western Cape economy over R1 billion.

While delivering his 2022 State of the Province Address (SOPA) on 15 February 2022, Winde demanded that Ramaphosa end the national COVID-19 state of disaster. He said: "To be clear: we want the date and the time, and not generalised commitment." On 15 March 2022, Winde condemned the Minister of Co-operative Governance and Traditional Affairs, Nkosazana Dlamini-Zuma's decision to extend the State of disaster for another month.

=== 2024 electoral campaign ===
On 26 August 2023, DA leader John Steenhuisen announced that Winde was the party's Western Cape premier candidate for the 2024 provincial election. The DA retained control of the province at the election, winning over 55% of the vote and 24 seats in the provincial parliament.

=== Second term as premier ===
Winde was re-elected as premier during the first sitting of the Seventh Provincial Parliament on 13 June 2024. He received 26 votes while his challenger for the position, Muhammad Khalid Sayed of the African National Congress, received 14 votes.

In March 2026, the Western Cape Provincial Parliament's Conduct Committee found that Winde had breached the legislature's Code of Conduct by failing to disclose a sponsored foreign trip in the Register of Members' Interests. Winde had travelled to New York City in September 2024 in his official capacity as Premier and as the African co-chair of the Under2 Coalition to attend the 2024 Climate Week NYC conference. The return economy-class flight was sponsored by the coalition and valued at R51,000. The provincial government initially covered the cost of the flight and the coalition later reimbursed the cost.

Winde did not declare the trip in his submissions to the Registrar of Members' Interests in February 2025 and the Leader of the Opposition in the Provincial Parliament Khalid Sayed lodged a complaint. The committee determined in its report that Winde attending in an official capacity and the subsequent reimbursement by the Under2 Coalition to the provincial government did not exempt Winde from the disclosure obligation. His failure to register the sponsorship is what constituted the breach.

== Personal life ==
Winde married his wife, Tracy, in 1993. They have two children and live in the suburb of Claremont, Cape Town. Winde's son is studying sound engineering while his daughter has finished high school. Winde was a member of his daughter's high school's governing body.

Winde is a type 2 diabetic. In May 2021, it was reported that he managed to turn his twelve-year history with diabetes around by doing a 21-day plant-based eating programme with the help of the Ubuntu Wellness Centre, a wellness non-profit organisation in Cape Town.

Political offices
Preceded by Helen Zille	8th Premier of the Western Cape; 2019–present	Incumbent
Preceded by Dan Plato	Western Cape Provincial Minister of Community Safety; 2018–2019	Succeeded by Albert Fritz
Preceded by Position established	Western Cape Provincial Minister of Economic Opportunities; 2014–2018	Succeeded by Beverley Schäfer
Preceded by Garth Strachan	Western Cape Provincial Minister of Finance, Economic Development and Tourism; 2009–2014	Succeeded by Position dissolved
