= List of acts of the Western Cape Provincial Parliament =

This is a list of the laws and acts passed by the Western Cape Provincial Parliament, the legislature of the Western Cape province of South Africa. From 1994 to 1997 the parliament's enactments were known as "Laws"; since then they have been called "Acts".

== 1994 ==
Act no.	Short title
1	Western Cape Law on the Amendment of the Municipal Ordinance of 1974, 1994
2	Western Cape Law on the Amendment of the Divisional Councils Ordinance of 1976, 1994
3	Payment of Members of the Western Cape Provincial Legislature Law, 1994
4	Western Cape Exchequer Law, 1994
5	Western Cape Provincial Service Commission Law, 1994
6	Western Cape Provincial Public Protector Law, 1994
7	Western Cape Delegation of Powers Law, 1994
8	Western Cape Provincial Tender Board Law, 1994
9	Western Cape Provincial Housing Law, 1994
10	Western Cape School Education Law, 1994
11	Western Cape Colleges of Education Law, 1994
12	Western Cape Technical Colleges Law, 1994

== 1995 ==
Act no.	Short title
1	Western Cape Law on the Amendment of the Property Valuation Ordinance, 1993, 1995
2	Western Cape Adjustments Appropriation Law, 1995
3	Western Cape Law on the Powers and Privileges of the Provincial Legislature, 1995
4	Cape Metropolitan Commission Law, 1995
5	Western Cape Appropriation Law, 1995
6	Western Cape Law on the Amendment of the Municipal Ordinance (Cape), 1995

== 1996 ==
Act no.	Short title
1	Western Cape Adjustments Appropriation Law, 1996
2	Western Cape Additional Adjustments Appropriation Law, 1996
3	Western Cape Investment and Trade Promotion Agency Law, 1996 (before 2006); Western Cape Investment and Trade Promotion Agency Act, 1996 (2006–2013); Western Cape Tourism, Trade and Investment Promotion Agency Act, 1996 (after 2013)
4	Western Cape Gambling and Racing Law, 1996 (before 2006); Western Cape Gambling and Racing Act, 1996 (after 2006)
5	Provincial Development Council Law, 1996
6	Western Cape Appropriation Law, 1996
7	Western Cape School Education Amendment Law, 1996
8	Western Cape Road Transportation Act Amendment Law, 1996

== 1997 ==
Act no.	Short title
1	No act by this number
2	Western Cape Adjustments Appropriation Law, 1997
3	Western Cape Tourism Act, 1997
4	Western Cape Gambling and Racing Amendment Act, 1996
5	Western Cape Appropriation Act, 1997
6	Western Cape Act on the Transitional Provisions regarding Administrator's Proclamation 147 of 1993, 1997
7	Western Cape Colleges of Education Law Amendment Act, 1997
8	Western Cape Property Valuation Ordinance Amendment Act, 1997
9	Western Cape Municipal Ordinance, 1974 Amendment Act, 1997
10	Western Cape Second Gambling and Racing Amendment Act, 1997
11	Western Cape Third Gambling and Racing Amendment Act, 1997
12	Western Cape Provincial School Education Act, 1997
13	Western Cape Finance Act, 1997

== 1998 ==
Act no.	Short title
1	Constitution of the Western Cape, 1997
2	Payment of Members of the Western Cape Provincial Legislature Law Amendment Act, 1998
3	Western Cape Law on the Powers and Privileges of the Provincial Legislature Amendment Act, 1998
4	Western Cape Adjustments Appropriation Act, 1998
5	Western Cape Interim Appropriation Act, 1998
6	Western Cape Land Administration Act, 1998
7	Western Cape Provincial Coat of Arms Act, 1998
8	Western Cape Fourth Gambling and Racing Amendment Act, 1998
9	Western Cape Fifth Gambling and Racing Amendment Act, 1998
10	Western Cape Provincial Commissions Act, 1998
11	Western Cape Appropriation Act, 1998
12	Western Cape Road Traffic Act, 1998
13	Western Cape Provincial Languages Act, 1998
14	Western Cape Cultural Commission and Cultural Councils Act, 1998
15	Western Cape Nature Conservation Board Act, 1998

== 1999 ==
Act no.	Short title
1	Western Cape Adjustments Appropriation Act, 1999
2	Dog Tax Ordinance Amendment Act, 1999
3	Western Cape Appropriation Act, 1999
4	Western Cape Sixth Gambling and Racing Amendment Act, 1999
5	Western Cape Seventh Gambling and Racing Amendment Act. 1999
6	Western Cape Housing Development Act, 1999
7	Western Cape Planning and Development Act, 1999
8	Western Cape Nature and Environmental Conservation Ordinance Amendment Act, 1999
9	Western Cape Provincial Honours Act, 1999
10	Western Cape Finance Act, 1999
11	Western Cape Toll Roads Act, 1999
12	Western Cape Second Finance Act, 1999

== 2000 ==
Act no.	Short title
1	Western Cape Finance Act, 2000
2	Western Cape Adjustments Appropriation Act, 2000
3	Western Cape Nature Conservation Laws Amendment Act, 2000
4	Municipal Ordinance, 1974, Amendment Act, 2000
5	Western Cape Appropriation Act, 2000
6	Western Cape Direct Charges Act, 2000
7	Western Cape Road Transportation Act Amendment Act, 2000
8	Cape Town International Convention Centre Company Act, 2000
9	Western Cape Determination of Types of Municipalities Act, 2000
10	Western Cape Eighth Gambling and Racing Amendment Act, 2000
11	Western Cape Ninth Gambling and Racing Amendment Act, 2000

== 2001 ==
Act no.	Short title
1	Western Cape Second Adjustments Appropriation Act, 2001
2	Western Cape Adjustments Appropriation Act, 2001
3	Western Cape Appropriation Act, 2001
4	Western Cape Second Adjustments Appropriation Act, 2001
5	Western Cape Act on the Amendment of the Land Use Planning Ordinance, 2001
6	Western Cape First Finance Act, 2001
7	Western Cape Health Facility Boards Act, 2001
8	Western Cape Second Finance Act, 2001
9	Western Cape Tenth Gambling and Racing Amendment Act, 2001
10	Western Cape Third Finance Act, 2001
11	Western Cape Third Adjustments Appropriation Act, 2001

== 2002 ==
Act no.	Short title
1	Western Cape Appropriation Act, 2002
2	Western Cape First Finance Act, 2002
3	Members of the Western Cape Provincial Parliament Code of Conduct Act, 2002
4	Western Cape Determination of Types of Municipalities Amendment Act, 2002
5	Western Cape Social Grant and Consolidated Municipal Infrastructure Programme Grant Appropriation Act, 2002
6	Western Cape Health Act Amendment Act, 2002
7	Western Cape Land Use Planning Ordinance, 1985, Amendment Act, 2002
8	Western Cape Eleventh Gambling and Racing Amendment Act, 2002
9	Western Cape Adjustments Appropriation Act, 2002
10	Western Cape Consumer Affairs (Unfair Business Practices) Act, 2002
11	Businesses Amendment Act, 2002

== 2003 ==
Act no.	Short title
1	Western Cape Twelfth Gambling and Racing Amendment Act, 2003
2	Western Cape First Finance Act, 2003
3	Western Cape Thirteenth Gambling and Racing Amendment Act, 2003
4	Members of The Western Cape Provincial Parliament Code of Conduct Amendment Act, 2003
5	Western Cape Appropriation Act, 2003
6	Western Cape Land Use Planning Ordinance, 1985, Amendment Act, 2003
7	Western Cape Fourteenth Gambling and Racing Amendment Act, 2003
8	Western Cape Adjustments Appropriation Act, 2003
9	Western Cape Direct Charges Amendment Act, 2003
10	Western Cape Provincial Tender Board Law Repeal Act, 2003

== 2004 ==
Act no.	Short title
1	Western Cape Tourism Act, 2004
2	Western Cape Land Use Planning Ordinance. 1985. Amendment Act, 2004
3	Western Cape Appropriation Act, 2004
4	Provincial Development Council Law Amendment Act, 2004
5	Western Cape Provincial Youth Commission Act, 2004
6	Western Cape Adjustments Appropriation Act, 2004
7	Western Cape First Finance Act, 2004

== 2005 ==
Act no.	Short title
1	Western Cape Investment and Trade Promotion Agency Law Amendment Act, 2005
2	Western Cape Housing Development Amendment Act, 2005
3	Provincial Archives and Records Service of the Western Cape Act, 2005
4	Western Cape Appropriation Act, 2005
5	Land Use Planning Ordinance, 1985, Amendment Act, 2005
6	Western Cape Exchequer Law Repeal Act, 2005
7	Western Cape Adjustments Appropriation Act, 2005
8	Western Cape Finance Act, 2005

== 2006 ==
Act no.	Short title
1	Western Cape Appropriation Act, 2006
2	Western Cape Witnesses Act, 2006
3	Western Cape Petitions Act, 2006
4	Western Cape Fifteenth Gambling and Racing Amendment Act, 2006
5	Western Cape First Finance Act, 2006
6	Western Cape Adjustments Appropriation Act, 2006

== 2007 ==
Act no.	Short title
1	Provincial Capital Fund Ordinance Amendment Act, 2007
2	No act by this number
3	Western Cape Appropriation Act, 2007
4	Land Use Planning Ordinance, 1985, Amendment Act, 2007
5	Western Cape First Finance Act, 2007
6	Western Cape Less Formal Township Establishment Amendment Act, 2007
7	Western Cape Health Care Waste Management Act, 2007
8	Western Cape Removal of Restrictions Amendment Act, 2007
9	Western Cape Adjustments Appropriation Act, 2007

== 2008 ==
Act no.	Short title
1	Western Cape Direct Charges Amendment Act, 2008
2	Western Cape Appropriation Act, 2008
3	Western Cape Special Adjustments Appropriation Act, 2008
4	Western Cape Liquor Act, 2008
5	Western Cape Health Services Fees Act, 2008
6	Western Cape Ambulance Personnel Transfer and Pensions Ordinance Repeal Act, 2008
7	Western Cape Adjustments Appropriation Act, 2008

== 2009 ==
Act no.	Short title
1	Western Cape Land Use Planning Ordinance, 1985, Amendment Act, 2009
2	Western Cape Provincial Youth Commission Act Repeal Act, 2009
3	Western Cape Appropriation Act, 2009
4	Western Cape Problem Animal Control Ordinance Repeal Act, 2009
5	Western Cape Unauthorised Expenditure Act, 2009
6	Western Cape Irregular Expenditure Act, 2009
7	Western Cape Sixteenth Gambling and Racing Amendment Act, 2009
8	Western Cape Adjustments Appropriation Act, 2009

== 2010 ==
Act no.	Short title
1	Western Cape Appropriation Act, 2010
2	Western Cape Unauthorised Expenditure Act, 2010
3	Western Cape Ambulance Services Act, 2010
4	Western Cape Local Government Laws Rationalisation Act, 2010
5	Western Cape District Health Councils Act, 2010
6	Western Cape Health Care Waste Management Amendment Act, 2010
7	Western Cape Provincial School Education Amendment Act, 2010
8	Western Cape Procurement (Business Interests of Employees) Act, 2010
9	Western Cape Adjustments Appropriation Act, 2010
10	Western Cape Liquor Amendment Act, 2010

== 2011 ==
Act no.	Short title
1	Western Cape Appropriation Act, 2011
2	Western Cape Land Use Planning Ordinance Amendment Act, 2011
3	Western Cape Land Use Planning Ordinance Second Amendment Act, 2011
4	Western Cape Laws Repeal Act, 2011
5	Provincial Development Council Act Repeal Act, 2011
6	Western Cape Biosphere Reserves Act, 2011
7	Western Cape Privileges and Immunities of Councillors Act, 2011
8	Western Cape Adjustments Appropriation Act, 2011

== 2012 ==
Act no.	Short title
1	Western Cape Additional Adjustments Appropriation Act (2011/12 Financial Year), 2012
2	Western Cape Appropriation Act, 2012
3	Western Cape Unauthorised Expenditure Act, 2012
4	Western Cape Laws Repeal Act, 2012
5	Provincial Capital Fund Ordinance Repeal Act, 2012
6	Western Cape Provincial Road Traffic Administration Act, 2012
7	Western Cape Health Facility Boards Amendment Act, 2012
11	Western Cape Adjustments Appropriation Act, 2012

== 2013 ==
Act no.	Short title
1	Western Cape Transport Infrastructure Act, 2013
2	Cape Town International Convention Centre Company Amendment Act, 2013
3	Western Cape Community Safety Act, 2013
4	Western Cape Additional Adjustments Appropriation Act (2012/13 Financial Year), 2013
5	Western Cape Appropriation Act, 2013
6	Western Cape Investment and Trade Promotion Agency Amendment Act, 2013
7	Western Cape Seventeenth Gambling and Racing Amendment Act, 2013
8	Western Cape Eighteenth Gambling and Racing Amendment Act, 2013
9	Western Cape District Health Councils Amendment Act, 2013
10	Western Cape Unauthorised Expenditure Act, 2013
11	Western Cape Adjustments Appropriation Act, 2013
12	Western Cape Membership of the Western Cape Economic Development Partnership Act, 2013

== 2014 ==
Act no.	Short title
1	Western Cape Additional Adjustments Appropriation Act (2013/14 Financial Year), 2014
2	Western Cape Independent Health Complaints Committee Act, 2014
3	Western Cape Land Use Planning Act, 2014
4	Western Cape Monitoring and Support of Municipalities Act, 2014
5	Western Cape Appropriation Act, 2014
6	Western Cape Adjustments Appropriation Act, 2014

== 2015 ==
Act no.	Short title
1	Western Cape Additional Adjustments Appropriation Act (2014/15 Financial Year), 2015
2	Western Cape Appropriation Act, 2015
3	Western Cape Liquor Amendment Act, 2015
4	Western Cape Adjustments Appropriation Act, 2015

== 2016 ==
Act no.	Short title
1	Saldanha Bay Industrial Development Zone Licensing Company, 2016
2	Western Cape Additional Adjustments Appropriation Act (2015/16 Financial Year), 2016
3	Western Cape Appropriation Act, 2016
4	Western Cape Health Facility Boards and Committees Act, 2016
5	Western Cape Liquor Amendment Act, 2016
6	Western Cape Adjustments Appropriation Act, 2016

== 2017 ==
Act no.	Short title
1	Western Cape Appropriation Act, 2017
2	Western Cape Adjustments Appropriation (Emergency Funds) Act, 2017
3	Western Cape Local Government Laws Rationalisation Act, 2017
4	Western Cape Adjustments Appropriation Act, 2017

== 2018 ==
Act no.	Short title
1	Western Cape Additional Adjustments Appropriation Act (2017/18 Financial Year), 2019
2	Western Cape Housing Development Amendment Act, 2018
3	Western Cape Appropriation Act, 2018
4	Western Cape Provincial School Education Amendment Act, 2018
5	Western Cape Adjustments Appropriation Act, 2018

== 2019 ==
Act no.	Short title
1	Western Cape Additional Adjustment Appropriation Act (2018/19 Financial Year), 2019
2	Western Cape Commissioner for Children Act, 2019
3	Western Cape Special Economic Development Infrastructure Company Act, 2019
4	Western Cape Appropriation Act, 2019
5	Western Cape Adjustments Appropriation Act, 2019

== 2020 ==
Act no.	Short title
1	Western Cape Additional Adjustment Appropriation Act (2019/20 Financial Year), 2020
2	Western Cape Appropriation Act, 2020
