= Provincial Legislature Building =

Building in Cape Town CBD

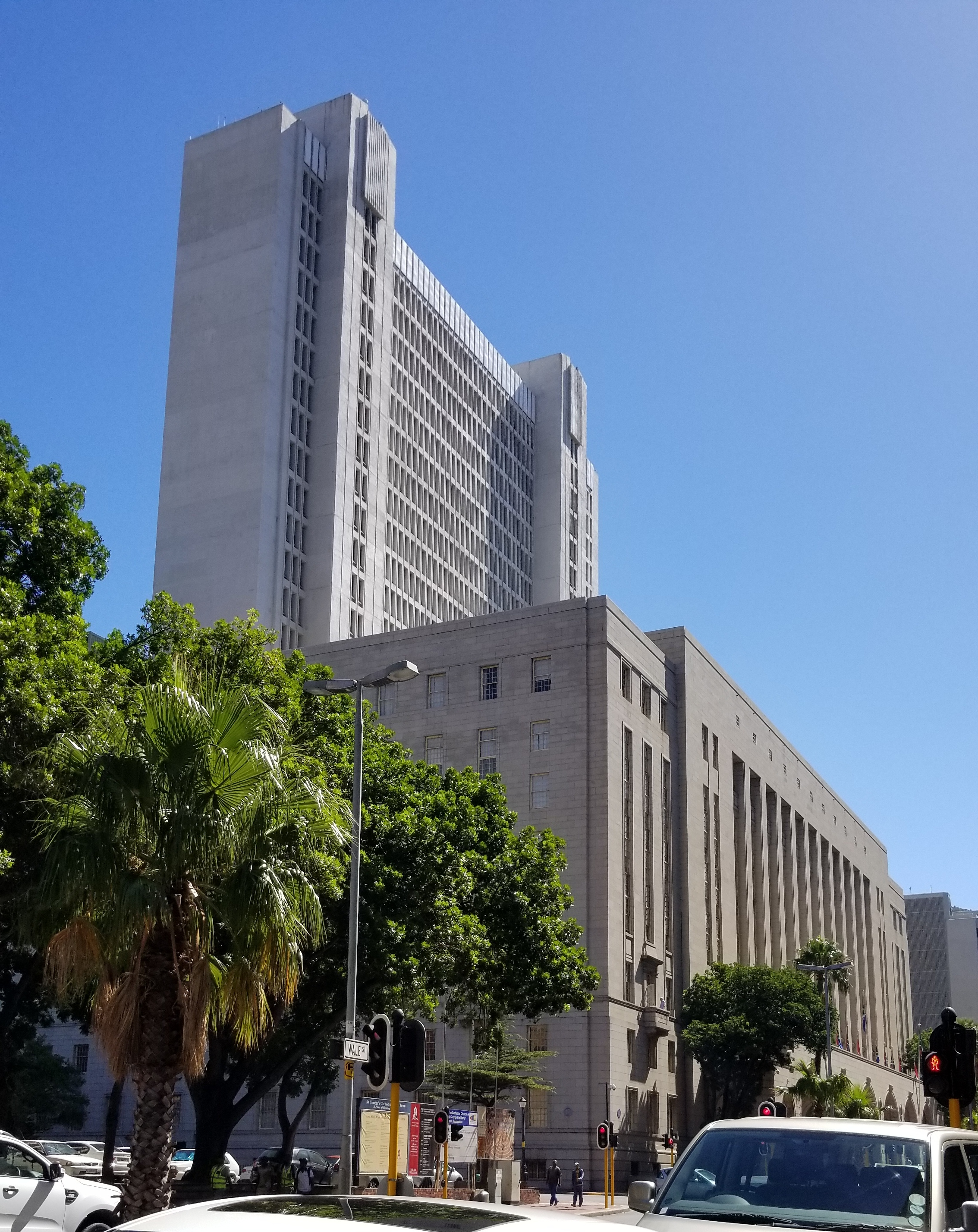
- Alternative names: Western Cape Parliament Building

General information
- Status: Completed
- Location: 7 Wale Street, Cape Town CBD, Cape Town, South Africa
- Current tenants: Western Cape Provincial Parliament
- Year built: 1939–1944 (original structure)
- Construction started: 1939; 87 years ago
- Opened: 1944; 82 years ago (original structure)
- Renovated: 1976; 50 years ago (high-rise addition)
- Affiliation: The Western Cape Government

Height
- Architectural: 101m

Technical details
- Floor count: 26

Design and construction
- Architects: Frederick McIntosh Glennie and Jan Zeger Schuurmans Stekhoven
- Other designers: Ivan Mitford-Barberton (architectural sculpture)
- Known for: Seat of the Western Cape Provincial Parliament since 1994

The Provincial Legislature Building is a skyscraper in Cape Town, South Africa. Situated in the city's CBD, the 101m tall, 26-floor tower serves as the seat of the Western Cape Government, and includes offices for the provincial government, as well as the province's legislative chamber.

As of 2026, it is the 10th-tallest building in Cape Town.

== Location ==
The building is located at 7 Wale Street, in Cape Town CBD, the city's main commercial district. Aside from Wale Street itself, other major nearby roadways include Adderly, Bree, and Strand Streets. The building is around 2km from the point at which the N1 and N2 freeways enter the CBD.

The Provincial Legislature Building is situated approximately 850m from the Iziko South African Museum, 3km from Green Point, 2km from Gardens, and 650m from the Parliament of South Africa.

== History ==
The current building forms part of the former Cape Provincial Administration complex, whose original structure was designed by architects Frederick McIntosh Glennie and Jan Zeger Schuurmans Stekhoven. The original administrative building was constructed between 1939 and 1944. The first government officials began occupying the building in 1944.

Decades later, during the 1970s, the current high-rise portion, designed by H. van der Merwe & Partners, was added on the site. It was completed in 1976.

In 2015, the provincial government undertook an extensive refurbishment of the tower's exterior, including repairs to approximately 28,400 square meters of concrete surfaces.

== Function ==
The building serves as the seat of the Government of the Western Cape, and includes provincial administration offices, as well as the Western Cape Provincial Parliament.

== See also ==
- List of tallest buildings in Cape Town
