= Muhammad Khalid Sayed =

South African politician and youth activist

Muhammad Khalid Sayed MPP

Leader of the Opposition in the Western Cape Provincial Parliament
- Incumbent
- Assumed office 13 June 2024
- Preceded by: Cameron Dugmore

Chairperson of the Western Cape ANCYL
- Incumbent
- Assumed office 22 February 2015
- Deputy: Mfuzo Zenzile (2018–present); Thuso Mpulanyane (2015–2017)

Member of the Western Cape Provincial Parliament
- Incumbent
- Assumed office 22 May 2019

Personal details
- Born: 17 December 1984 (age 41)
- Party: African National Congress
- Occupation: Member of the Provincial Parliament
- Profession: Politician

Muhammad Khalid Sayed (born 17 December 1984) is a South African politician and youth activist who serves as the Leader of the Opposition in the Western Cape Provincial Parliament as a member of the African National Congress. He took office as an MPP in May 2019 and served as the ANC's deputy chief whip and shadow MEC for Education. He is also the chair of the provincial branch of the ANC Youth League. Elected in 2015, he has since been re-elected in 2018.

Sayed was re-elected to the Provincial Parliament at the 2024 general election. He was appointed Leader of the Opposition.
