= York High School (George) =

Location
- George, Western Cape; South Africa
- Coordinates: 33.9711°S 22.4510°E

Information
- Type: Public, Boarding
- Motto: Take Root and Grow
- Established: 1975
- Locale: Suburban
- Headmaster: F M Moll
- Grades: 8–12
- Colors: White, Blue and Grey
- Website: www.yorkhigh.co.za

York High School is a co-educational English Medium High School (Grade 8 to 12) for boarders and dayscholars in George, South Africa.

For many years the Southern Cape was served by dual-medium schools in George, Mossel Bay, Oudtshoorn and Knysna. There was a growing feeling that a purely English-medium school should be built and the Department of Education eventually agreed to this. Pioneers in the early days were Bob Cawood (Chairman of the Interim Committee) and Kenneth Smith (First School Committee Chairman). Active support came from the then Member of Parliament for George, Mr P W Botha, and in 1975 the York High School was built and one of the Outeniqua High School Hostels – the GJB Volschenk – was taken over by the new school. The school was started with classes from Std VI to VIII and the first Matrics wrote their final examinations in November 1977.

It was for many years the only English medium high school between Cape Town and Port Elizabeth. A state school, it was formerly a "Model C" school and was one of the first in the Cape Province to admit pupils of all races in the Apartheid era.

Now, years later, the school originally built for 300, houses approximately 925 learners. The Governing Body, in co-operation with the Department of Education, renovated the existing buildings in 1994 and built a new wing, comprising 12 new classrooms, change-rooms, Home Economics and Science laboratories and a lecture theatre which seats 200 learners. This was phase one of the projected plans.

York provides various sporting facilities. During the 2008/2009 years York established a quality artificial turf facility, which can be considered as one of the best AstroTurf facilities in South Africa. York also boasts quality cricket fields, squash and tennis courts, as well as 2 rugby fields. York now has a very strong cricket and hockey group, a reason for their sporting success. Rugby has recently shown increasing strength in the school and is fast becoming one of the strongest sports. York High has become well known for striving for "Sporting Excellence".

The school badge features the York Rose and the motto, "Take Root and Grow", a quote taken from the diary of an ancestor of the founding Headmaster, Mr Ron Dugmore.
