= Cameron Dugmore =

South African politician

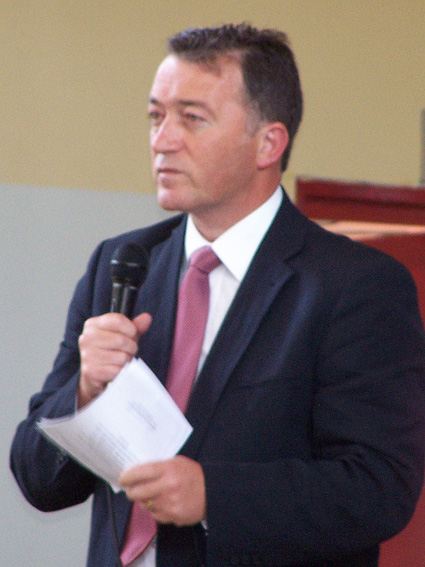
- Dugmore in 2007

Leader of the Opposition in the Western Cape Provincial Parliament
- In office 22 May 2019 – 28 May 2024
- Premier: Alan Winde
- Preceded by: Khaya Magaxa
- Succeeded by: Muhammad Khalid Sayed

Western Cape Provincial Minister of Cultural Affairs and Sport
- In office 2 August 2008 – 6 May 2009
- Premier: Lynne Brown
- Preceded by: Whitey Jacobs
- Succeeded by: Sakkie Jenner

Western Cape Provincial Minister of Education
- In office 30 April 2004 – 2 August 2008
- Premier: Lynne Brown; Ebrahim Rasool
- Preceded by: André Gaum
- Succeeded by: Yousuf Gabru

Member of the Western Cape Provincial Parliament Formerly: Western Cape Provincial Legislature
- In office 21 May 2014 – 6 May 2024
- Constituency: Hessequa
- In office 7 May 1994 – 6 May 2009
- Constituency: Mosselbay

Personal details
- Born: Cameron Muir Dugmore; 16 September 1963 (age 63)
- Party: African National Congress (1991–present)
- Spouse: Melanie Lue (divorced)
- Children: 2 daughters; 1 son
- Education: Union Preparatory School; York High School; University of Cape Town
- Occupation: Politician

Cameron Muir Dugmore (born 16 September 1963) is a South African politician who was elected to the National Assembly of South Africa in the 2024 general election as a member of the African National Congress. Prior to his election, he was the Leader of the Opposition in the Western Cape Provincial Parliament from 2019 until 2024. Dugmore served in the Western Cape Provincial Parliament from 1994 until 2009 and again from 2014 until 2024. He served as the Western Cape Provincial Minister of Cultural Affairs and Sport from 2008 to 2009, and as the Western Cape Provincial Minister of Education from 2004 to 2008.

== Early life and activism ==
Cameron Muir Dugmore was born in 1963 as Gillian and Ron Dugmore's second of five children. His mother was a Black Sash member. He often moved from city to city, living in Pietermaritzburg, Grahamstown and Komga where his father was a teacher and head of school. From 1969 to 1974, he attended Union Preparatory School. He was enrolled at York High School in George in 1977. In 1978, he participated in anti-apartheid activities. The activities included removal of beach apartheid signs at Herolds Bay and Victoria Bay. The activities were led by his mother.

He served as Head Boy and matriculated from York High School. In 1982, he went to the University of Cape Town to study languages and law.

While there in 1983, he joined the National Union of South African Students (Nusas). He also served as President of the Law Students Council. He chaired the NUSAS Education Action Committee. In 1984, he attained a BA in Arts and Law.

In 1985, he represented NUSAS UCT in the Education Charter Campaign led by the non-racial student movement. He took office as vice president of the Student Representative Council in 1986 and not long after, in 1988, he was elected president and joined the End Conscription Campaign as a conscientious objector.

In 1989, he was appointed to the United Democratic Front Western Cape Interim Committee and represented the UDF Western Cape at national meetings. In 1990, he took office as the first secretary of the National Sports Congress (NSC). The UDF Western Cape later appointed him as an organiser.

== Political career ==
In 1991, he became a member of the African National Congress and was involved in the Rondebosch (Gaby Shapiro) branch. He was elected to the African National Congress Regional Executive Committee and was soon appointed the head of the organising department in 1992 and 1993. He was also appointed the head of the African National Congress Western Cape Elections Voter Organisation and Training (VOT).

In 1994, he was elected as an ANC MPP and served as a PEC/PWC member. He also served as the PEC spokesperson. He was a branch delegate to the Mafikeng Conference in 1997. He headed the communication faction of the ANC's 1999 election campaign. He was re-elected in 1999. Dugmore served as a branch delegate to the Stellenbosch Conference in 2002.

In 2004, Premier Ebrahim Rasool appointed Dugmore to the post of Provincial Minister of Education. Rasool was recalled in 2008 and replaced by Lynne Brown as Premier. Brown designated Dugmore to the position of Provincial Minister of Cultural Affairs and Sport.

Dugmore left the Provincial Parliament in 2009 and was consequently appointed as convenor of the ANC Overberg Fishing Task Team. From 2010 to 2014, he was a special advisor to Trevor Manuel. He helped establish the Mitchells Plain Bursary and Role Model Trust, as well as the Mitchells Plain Skills Centre and the Mitchells Plain Education Forum. He was a delegate to the ANC Conference in Mangaung in 2012 but was denied accreditation at the conference and therefore could not represent the Western Cape branch.

In 2014, he returned to the Western Cape Provincial Parliament as an MPP for Hessequa. He was a branch delegate to the National Policy Conference in 2017.

In 2018, Dugmore declared his candidacy to replace embattled former ANC Western Cape Chairperson, Marius Fransman. Dugmore was mentioned as a possible ANC Western Cape Premier candidate for the 2019 elections.

In May 2019, he was re-elected to another term in the Western Cape Provincial Parliament. On 20 May 2019, the African National Congress named him the incoming Leader of the Opposition in the Western Cape Provincial Parliament. He assumed the office on 22 May 2019.

Dugmore was criticized for attending a Russian consulate event on 28 February 2022, four days after the start of Russia's 2022 invasion of Ukraine. At the event Dugmore gave a video interview in which he advocated for a neutral position on the invasion and criticised the Democratic Alliance's position supporting Ukraine. Dugmore's position was criticised by the Financial Mail as a type of "moral relativism" that ignores an "unprovoked, illegal invasion of a sovereign state."

Dugmore stood for the position of provincial chairperson of the ANC at the party's long-delayed provincial conference held from 23 to 25 June 2023 at the Cape Town International Convention Centre. He lost to the party's former Dullah Omar regional secretary, Vuyiso JJ Tyhalisisu, who was nominated from the conference floor, by 29 votes. Dugmore then successfully stood for election to the Provincial Executive Committee as an additional member.

Dugmore was elected to the National Assembly of South Africa in the 2024 general election.

== Incident ==
In March 2018, violent protests occurred in Hermanus and the surrounding area. Provincial Minister of Human Settlements, Bonginkosi Madikizela, said that he would submit a motion in the Provincial Parliament to refer Dugmore to the ethics committee for allegedly inciting violence. The provincial ANC denied the allegations.

== Personal life ==
Dugmore lives in the suburb of Rondebosch in Cape Town. He was married to Melanie Lue but is now divorced as of March 2022. They have three children.

Political offices
Preceded by Khaya Magaxa	Leader of the Opposition in the Western Cape Provincial Parliament; 2019–2024	Next: TBD
Preceded by Whitey Jacobs	Provincial Minister of Cultural Affairs and Sport; 2008–2009	Succeeded by Sakkie Jenner
Preceded by André Gaum	Provincial Minister of Education; 2004–2008	Succeeded by Yousuf Gabru
