= Government of the Western Cape =

Government of the Western Cape province of South Africa

Western Cape Government Wes-Kaapse Regering (Afrikaans)
- Logo of the Western Cape government
- Polity type: Province
- Part of: South Africa
- Constitution: Constitution of the Western Cape

Legislative branch
- Name: Provincial Parliament
- Type: Unicameral
- Meeting place: Provincial Legislature Building, 7 Wale Street, Cape Town CBD, Cape Town, South Africa
- Presiding officer: Daylin Mitchell, Speaker

Executive branch
- Head of government
- Title: Premier
- Currently: Alan Winde
- Appointer: Provincial Parliament

The Western Cape province of South Africa is governed in a parliamentary system in which the people elect the Provincial Parliament, and the parliament elects the Premier as head of the executive. The Premier leads a cabinet of provincial ministers overseeing various executive departments.

The provincial government is subject to the Constitution of the Western Cape and the Constitution of South Africa, which together form the supreme law of the province.

The Western Cape government has its offices in the Provincial Legislature Building, in Cape Town CBD.

== Parliament ==
The Western Cape Provincial Parliament, situated in Cape Town, is the legislative branch of the provincial government. The parliament is a unicameral legislature of 42 members, elected by a system of party-list proportional representation. An election is held every five years, conventionally at the same time as the election of the National Assembly. The most recent election occurred in 2024.

== Executive ==
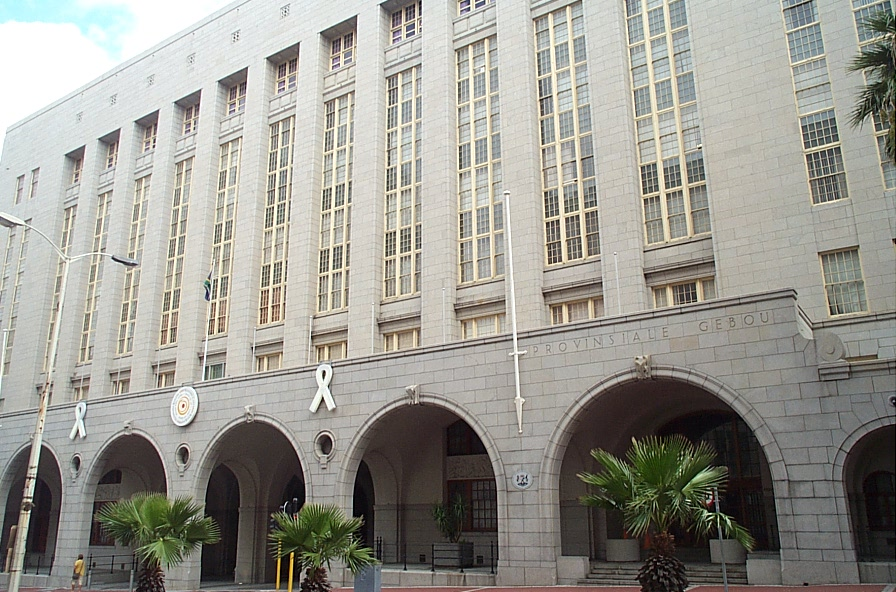
Provincial government building in Cape Town

The premier of the Western Cape is the head of the provincial government; chosen by the members of the provincial parliament from amongst themselves. The premier chooses a cabinet of ministers to oversee the various departments of the provincial government. The director-general is the non-political head of the provincial administration, while each government department is led by a head of department.

The current premier is Alan Winde of the Democratic Alliance and the director-general is Harry Malila. Besides the premier, the provincial cabinet consists of ten ministers overseeing thirteen departments.

=== Provincial Cabinet ===
Portfolio	MEC
Premier	Alan Winde
Finance	Deidré Baartman
Community Safety and Police Oversight	Anroux Marais
Education	Jaco Londt
Health and Wellness	Mireille Wenger
Infrastructure	Tertuis Simmers
Social Development	Jaco Londt
Mobility	Wendy Kaizer-Philander
Agriculture, Economic Development, and Tourism	Ivan Meyer
Cultural Affairs and Sport	Ricardo Mackenzie
Local Government, Environmental Affairs and Development Planning	Anton Bredell

=== Departments ===
These are the thirteen departments in the Western Cape Government:

- Department of Agriculture
- Department of Economic Development and Tourism
- Department of Community Safety
- Department of Cultural Affairs and Sport
- Department of Education
- Provincial Treasury
- Department of Health
- Department of Human Settlements
- Department of Local Government
- Department of Environmental Affairs and Development Planning
- Department of Social Development
- Department of Transport and Public Works
- Department of Premier

== Judiciary ==
South Africa has a single national judiciary; there is no separate system of provincial courts. The Western Cape Division of the High Court of South Africa has jurisdiction over all cases arising in the province, but generally handles only the most serious or high-profile criminal trials, high-value civil trials, cases involving judicial review of legislation or executive actions, and appeals from the magistrates' courts. Judges of the High Court periodically go on circuit to hear cases in parts of the province distant from Cape Town. Appeals from the High Court are to the national Supreme Court of Appeal and ultimately (if a constitutional matter is involved) to the Constitutional Court.

The province is divided into 42 magisterial districts and 2 sub-districts, each of which is served by a district magistrate's court. There are a further 12 branch courts and 26 periodical courts to serve densely populated or geographically dispersed districts. These district courts have jurisdiction over all criminal cases except murder, rape and treason and can impose a fine of up to R100,000 or a prison sentence of up to three years; and they have jurisdiction over civil cases where the value of the claim is less than R100,000. The regional magistrate's court for the Western Cape, which sits at multiple locations in the province, has jurisdiction over all criminal cases except treason and can impose a fine of up to R300,000 or a prison sentence of up to fifteen years (or life in some circumstances). The regional court also has jurisdiction over civil cases where the value of the claim is less than R300,000, and divorce and family law cases.

== Local government ==
The division of the Western Cape into municipalities.

The City of Cape Town metropolitan municipality is the local council for the Cape Town metropolitan area, which contains two-thirds of the province's population. The rest of the province is divided into five district municipalities which are subdivided into twenty-four local municipalities. The municipalities are listed below.

- City of Cape Town Metropolitan Municipality
- West Coast District Municipality
  - Matzikama Local Municipality, Cederberg Local Municipality, Bergrivier Local Municipality, Saldanha Bay Local Municipality, Swartland Local Municipality
- Cape Winelands District Municipality
  - Witzenberg Local Municipality, Drakenstein Local Municipality, Stellenbosch Local Municipality, Breede Valley Local Municipality, Langeberg Local Municipality
- Overberg District Municipality
  - Theewaterskloof Local Municipality, Overstrand Local Municipality, Cape Agulhas Local Municipality, Swellendam Local Municipality
- Garden Route District Municipality
  - Kannaland Local Municipality, Hessequa Local Municipality, Mossel Bay Local Municipality, George Local Municipality, Oudtshoorn Local Municipality, Bitou Local Municipality, Knysna Local Municipality
- Central Karoo District Municipality
  - Laingsburg Local Municipality, Prince Albert Local Municipality, Beaufort West Local Municipality

== See also ==
- Government of South Africa
- Politics of the Western Cape
