= Western Cape Department of Economic Development and Tourism =

Department of Economic Development and Tourism of the Government of the Western Cape

Department overview
- Jurisdiction: Government of the Western Cape
- Headquarters: 12th Floor, NBS Waldorf Building, 80 St George's Mall, Cape Town, 8001
- Annual budget: R529,362,000 (2020/21)
- Minister responsible: David Maynier, Western Cape Provincial Minister of Finance and Economic Opportunities
- Department executive: Solly Fourie, Head of Department
- Website: www.westerncape.gov.za/dept/edat

The Western Cape Department of Economic Development and Tourism (EDAT) is the department of the Western Cape government responsible for economic policy, economic planning and economic development within the province. It is also liable for promoting and developing the provincial tourism sector.

As of May 2019, the political head of the department has been Provincial Minister David Maynier. He also oversees the Provincial Treasury. The non-political head is Solly Fourie.

== See also ==
- Economy of the Western Cape
- Government of the Western Cape
