= Premier of the Western Cape =

Head of government of Western Cape, South Africa

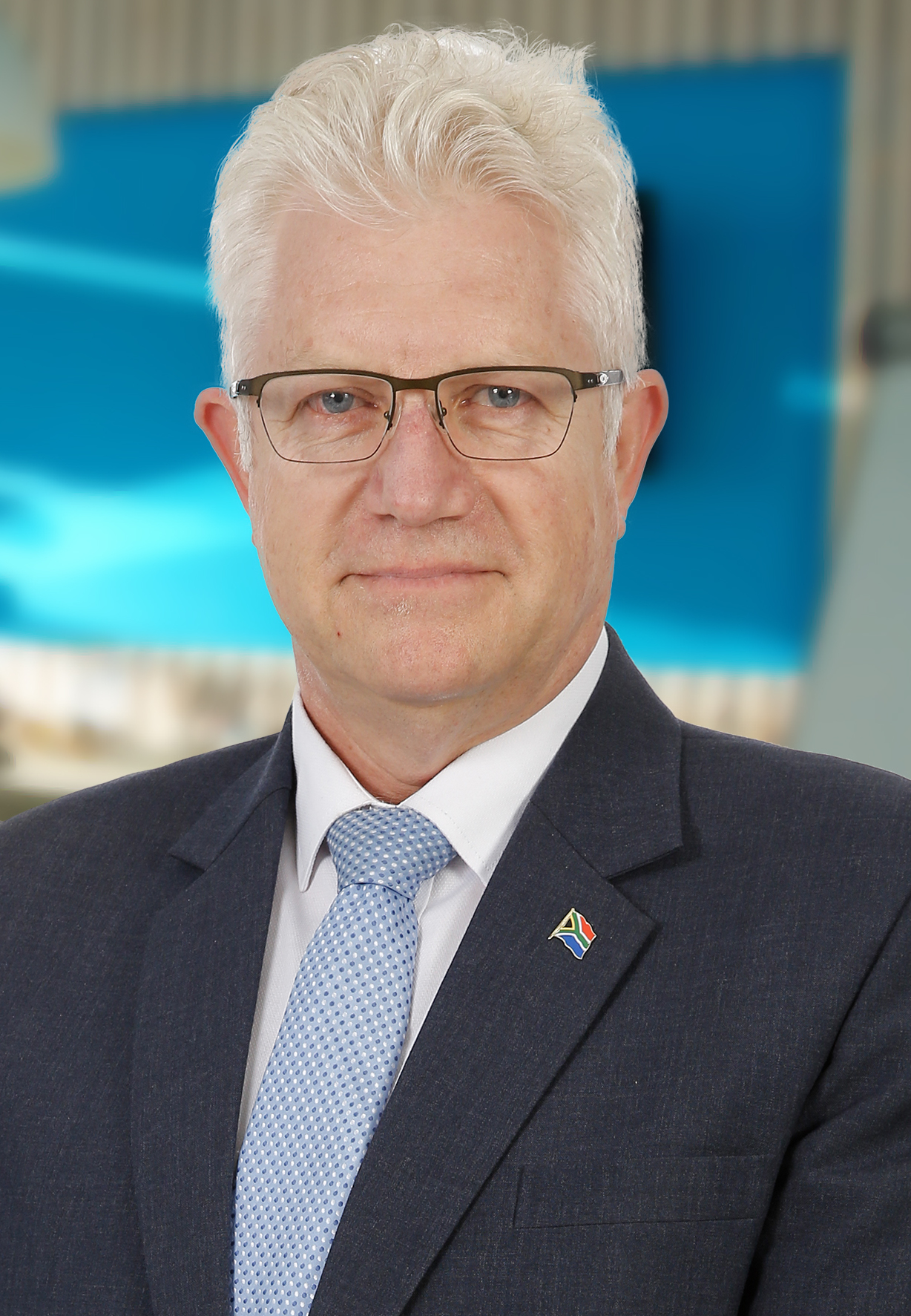
- Incumbent; Alan Winde since 22 May 2019
- Western Cape Government
- Style: Premier; The Honourable
- Type: Head of government
- Member of: National Council of Provinces; Member of the Executive Council
- Residence: Leeuwenhof
- Seat: Cape Town
- Appointer: Western Cape Provincial Parliament
- Term length: Five years, renewable once
- Constituting instrument: Constitution of South Africa; Constitution of the Western Cape
- Inaugural holder: Hernus Kriel
- Formation: 7 May 1994
- Salary: R2,3 million
- Website: Official website

The premier of the Western Cape is the head of government of the Western Cape province of South Africa. The current premier of the Western Cape is Alan Winde, a member of the Democratic Alliance, who was elected in the 2019 election. He took office on 22 May 2019.

== Functions ==
In terms of the provincial constitution, the executive authority of the province is vested in the premier. The premier appoints the provincial cabinet made up of ten members of the provincial parliament; they are known as provincial ministers. The premier has the ability to appoint and dismiss provincial ministers at his/her own discretion.

The premier and the provincial cabinet are responsible for implementing provincial legislation, along with any national legislation assigned to the province. They set provincial policy and manage the departments of the provincial government; their actions are subject to the national constitution and the provincial constitution.

In order for an act of the provincial parliament to become law, the premier must sign it. If he/she believes that the act is unconstitutional, it can be referred back to the provincial parliament for reconsideration. If the premier and the provincial parliament cannot agree, the act must be referred to the Constitutional Court for a final decision.

The premier is also ex officio a member of the National Council of Provinces, the upper house of Parliament, as one of the special delegates from the province.

== List ==
No.	Portrait	Name (Birth–Death)	Term of office			Political party
No.	Portrait	Name (Birth–Death)	Took office	Left office	Time in office	Political party
1		Hernus Kriel (1941–2015)	7 May 1994	11 May 1998	4 years, 4 days	National Party
2		Gerald Morkel (1941–2018)	11 May 1998	12 November 2001	3 years, 185 days	New National Party
–		Cecil Herandien (acting)	12 November 2001	5 December 2001	23 days	New National Party
3		Peter Marais (born 1948)	5 December 2001	3 June 2002	180 days	New National Party
–		Piet Meyer (acting)	3 June 2002	21 June 2002	18 days	New National Party
4		Marthinus van Schalkwyk (born 1959)	21 June 2002	23 April 2004	1 year, 307 days	New National Party
–		Leonard Ramatlakane (acting)	23 April 2004	30 April 2004	7 days	African National Congress
5		Ebrahim Rasool (born 1962)	30 April 2004	25 July 2008	4 years, 86 days	African National Congress
6		Lynne Brown (interim) (born 1961)	25 July 2008	6 May 2009	285 days	African National Congress
7		Helen Zille (born 1951)	6 May 2009	22 May 2019	10 years, 16 days	Democratic Alliance
8		Alan Winde (born 1965)	22 May 2019	Incumbent	7 years, 144 days	Democratic Alliance

== Election ==
The election for the Western Cape Provincial Parliament is held every five years, simultaneously with the election of the National Assembly; the last such election occurred on 8 May 2019. At the first meeting of the provincial parliament after an election, the members choose the premier from amongst themselves. The provincial parliament can force the premier to resign by a motion of no confidence. If the premiership becomes vacant (for whatever reason) the provincial parliament must choose a new premier to serve out the period until the next election. One person cannot have served more than two five-year terms as premier; however, when a premier is chosen to fill a vacancy the time until the next election does not count as a term.

The following table details the election results for the premier on the first sitting of the Sixth Provincial Parliament held on 22 May 2019.

Candidate	Votes	%
√ Alan Winde (DA)	24	70.6%
Cameron Dugmore (ANC)	10	29.4%
Total	34	100%
Valid votes	34	85.0%
Spoilt ballots	6	15.0%
Total votes cast	40	100%

== See also ==
- Politics of the Western Cape
- Premier (South Africa)
- President of South Africa
- Politics of South Africa
