= Gerald Morkel =

South African politician (1941–2018)

Mayor of Cape Town
- In office 13 December 2001 – 30 October 2002
- Preceded by: Peter Marais
- Succeeded by: Nomaindia Mfeketo

2nd Premier of the Western Cape
- In office 11 May 1998 – 12 November 2001
- Preceded by: Hernus Kriel
- Succeeded by: Peter Marais

Personal details
- Born: February 2, 1941 Cape Town, Cape Province, South Africa
- Died: 9 January 2018 (aged 76) Tokai, Cape Town, Western Cape, South Africa
- Party: Democratic Alliance
- Other political affiliations: New National Party; Labour Party
- Spouse: Hazel Morkel
- Children: 4
- Profession: Politician

Gerald Norman Morkel (2 February 1941 – 9 January 2018) was the Mayor of Cape Town and Premier of the Western Cape province in South Africa. He later served as a member of the Cape Town City Council for the Democratic Alliance until his retirement from politics in 2011.

== Political career ==
He was elected on a Labour Party ticket to the coloureds-only House of Representatives in the Tricameral Parliament in 1984. He defected to the National Party by 1994, and was appointed the Western Cape leader of the renamed New National Party by 1998, when he became premier of the province after Hernus Kriel stepped down. In the 1999 election, no party obtained a majority in the Western Cape. The NNP formed a coalition with the smaller Democratic Party, with Morkel remaining as premier. In 2000, plans began to prepare an amalgamation of the two parties under the name Democratic Alliance.

However, in 2001, the NNP leadership pulled out of its co-operation with the DA and instead sought to form a partnership with the African National Congress. Morkel was deeply critical of this decision and attempted to turn the majority of the NNP against it. When this failed, he was forced to resign as premier. Joining the DA, Morkel was then elected as mayor of Cape Town. He remained in office for less than a year, when the DA was ousted from power by an ANC-NNP coalition following the floor-crossing period in October 2002. Morkel continued for a while as Western Cape provincial leader of the DA but eventually stepped down due to his links to fraudster Jurgen Harksen.

He continued serving as a member of the City Council for Steenberg until 2011.

== Death ==
Morkel died on Tuesday afternoon, 9 January 2018, at his home in Tokai, Cape Town. His wife and sister were by his side. He was diagnosed with cancer in the abdomen, in 2014.

== Family ==
Morkel had three sons: Garth, Kent (also a politician) and Craig, and a daughter, Gail.

Political offices
Preceded by Hernus Kriel	Premier of the Western Cape; 11 May 1998 – 12 November 2001	Succeeded by Peter Marais
Preceded by Peter Marais	Mayor of Cape Town; 2001–2002	Succeeded by Nomaindia Mfeketo
