= Shahid Esau =

South African politician

Shahid Esau is a South African politician and a former member of parliament for the Democratic Alliance. He was a member of the Portfolio Committee on Defence and Military Veterans (National Assembly Committees) from 20 June 2014 until 7 May 2019.

He was previously the Speaker of the Western Cape Provincial Legislature under Helen Zille's provincial administration.
