= Peter Marais =

South African politician

The Honourable Peter Marais
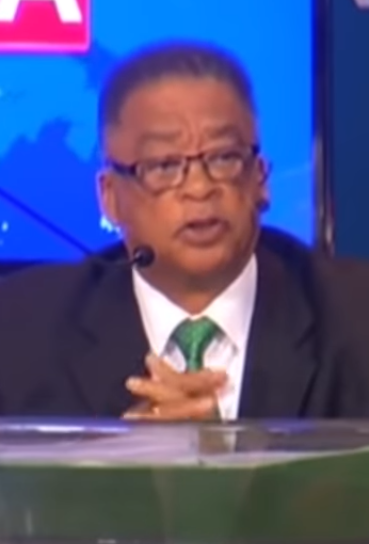

3rd Premier of the Western Cape
- In office 5 December 2001 – 3 June 2002
- Preceded by: Gerald Morkel
- Succeeded by: Marthinus van Schalkwyk

Mayor of Cape Town
- In office 7 December 2000 – 21 November 2001
- Preceded by: Position established
- Succeeded by: Gerald Morkel

Personal details
- Born: Petrus Jacobus Marais; 4 September 1948 (age 78) Cape Town, South Africa
- Party: FF+ (2019–present); ICOSA (2018–2019); COPE (2008–2009); NLP (2004); NNP (1997–2002); DA (2000–2001); NP (1994–1997); People's Congress Party (1984–1994)
- Spouse: Bonita
- Education: University of the Western Cape

Petrus Jacobus "Peter" Marais (born 4 September 1948) is a retired South African politician who served as a Member of the Western Cape Provincial Parliament.

He previously served as the inaugural Mayor of Cape Town from 2000 until his dismissal in 2001. He was soon appointed Premier of the Western Cape and served from 2001 to 2002. He has been a member of multiple political parties and movements.

Marais joined the Freedom Front Plus in January 2019 and consequently became the party's Western Cape Premier candidate for the 2019 election. He returned to the Western Cape Provincial Parliament in May 2019.

== Political career ==
Marais was the leader of the People's Congress Party and represented the party in the House of Representatives from 1984 to 1994. He joined the National Party in 1994, and was elected to the Western Cape Provincial Parliament later in the same year. In 1998, the newly-elected Premier of the Western Cape, Gerald Morkel, appointed Marais to the post of Provincial Minister of Health and Welfare. Morkel later dismissed him as Provincial Minister in February 2000 but re-appointed him to the Provincial Cabinet in June, heading the Social Services and Poverty Relief portfolio.

Marais was a senior member of the New National Party. He became a member of the newly formed Democratic Alliance in June 2000 and consequently held dual party membership. He was the Democratic Alliance's Cape Town mayoral candidate for the December local government elections. The DA won a majority of seats on the newly established Cape Town City Council and Marais was elected Mayor of Cape Town in December 2000. Due to his unhappiness with Marais, the Leader of Democratic Alliance, Tony Leon, dismissed Marais as mayor in 2001. Marais subsequently appealed to The Western Cape High Court and the court ordered his reinstatement in November 2001. He resigned as Mayor of Cape Town hours after the court delivered its judgement. The sacking of Marais contributed to the New National Party pulling out of the Democratic Alliance.

Marais was elected Premier of the Western Cape on 5 December 2001 and served until his resignation on 3 June 2002 amid allegations of sexual harassment. The Western Cape High Court later found him not guilty of the charges.

Following his departure from the New National Party, Marais founded the New Labour Party. The party performed poorly in the 2004 elections and as a result, was dissolved.

Marais joined the newly-formed Congress of the People in November 2008 but quit the party in 2009. He alongside Danny Titus established the Brown Empowerment Movement (Afrikaans: Bruin Bemagtiging Beweging) in June 2013. Marais joined the Independent Civic Organisation of South Africa in July 2018.

In January 2019, Leader of the Freedom Front Plus, Pieter Groenewald, announced Marais as the party's Western Cape Premier candidate for the general election on 8 May. At the elections, the Freedom Front Plus won one seat in the Western Cape Provincial Parliament. Marais filled the seat on 22 May 2019.

Marais retired from politics at the 2024 provincial election. His son, Grant, succeeded him as the sole representative of the FF Plus in the Provincial Parliament.

Political offices
Preceded by Position established	Mayor of Cape Town; 7 December 2000 – 21 November 2001	Succeeded by Gerald Morkel
Preceded by Gerald Morkel	Premier of the Western Cape; 5 December 2001 – 3 June 2002	Succeeded by Marthinus van Schalkwyk
