= 2009 Western Cape provincial election =

Provincial election

- 22 April 2009

All 42 seats in the Western Cape Provincial Parliament 22 seats needed for a majority
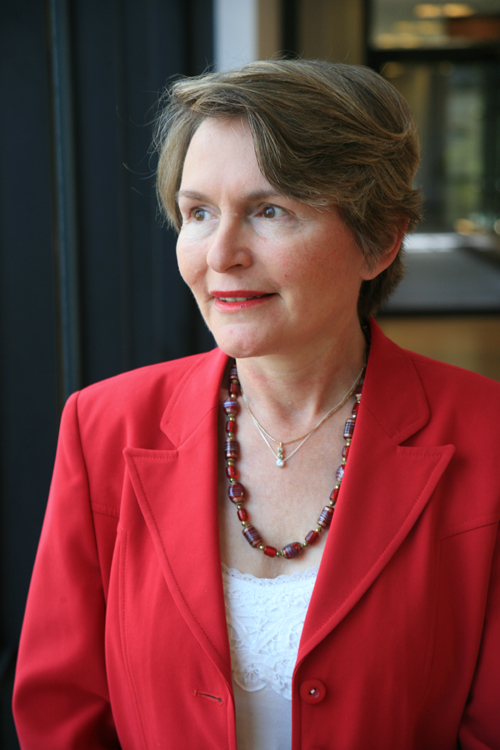

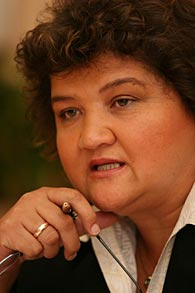

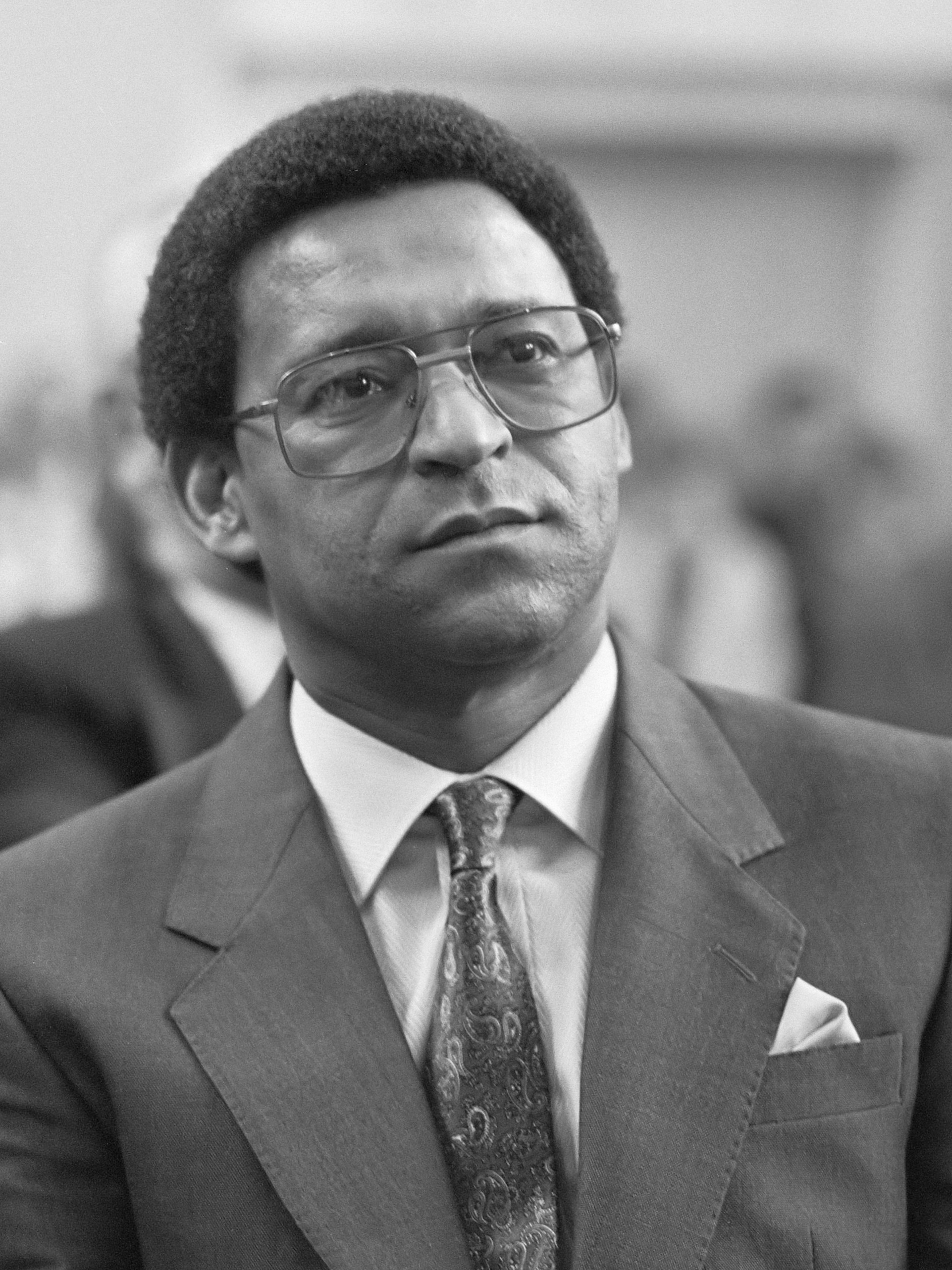
	First party	Second party	Third party
Candidate	Helen Zille	Lynne Brown	Allan Boesak
Party	DA	ANC	COPE
Last election	12 seats, 27.11%	19 seats, 45.25%	-
Seats before	11	27	-
Seats won	22	14	3
Seat change	▲10	▼5	New party
Popular vote	1,012,568	620,918	152,356
Percentage	51.46%	31.55%	7.74%
Swing	▲24.35	▼13.70	New party
- Map showing the winning party by voting district Democratic Alliance African National Congress Independent Democrats Congress of the People Tie between two or more parties
Premier before election
Lynne Brown
African National Congress
Elected Premier
Helen Zille
Democratic Alliance

The 2009 Western Cape provincial election was held on 22 April 2009 alongside the 2009 general elections to elect the 42 members of the 4th Western Cape Provincial Parliament. It was the third time in provincial history that saw a change of government.

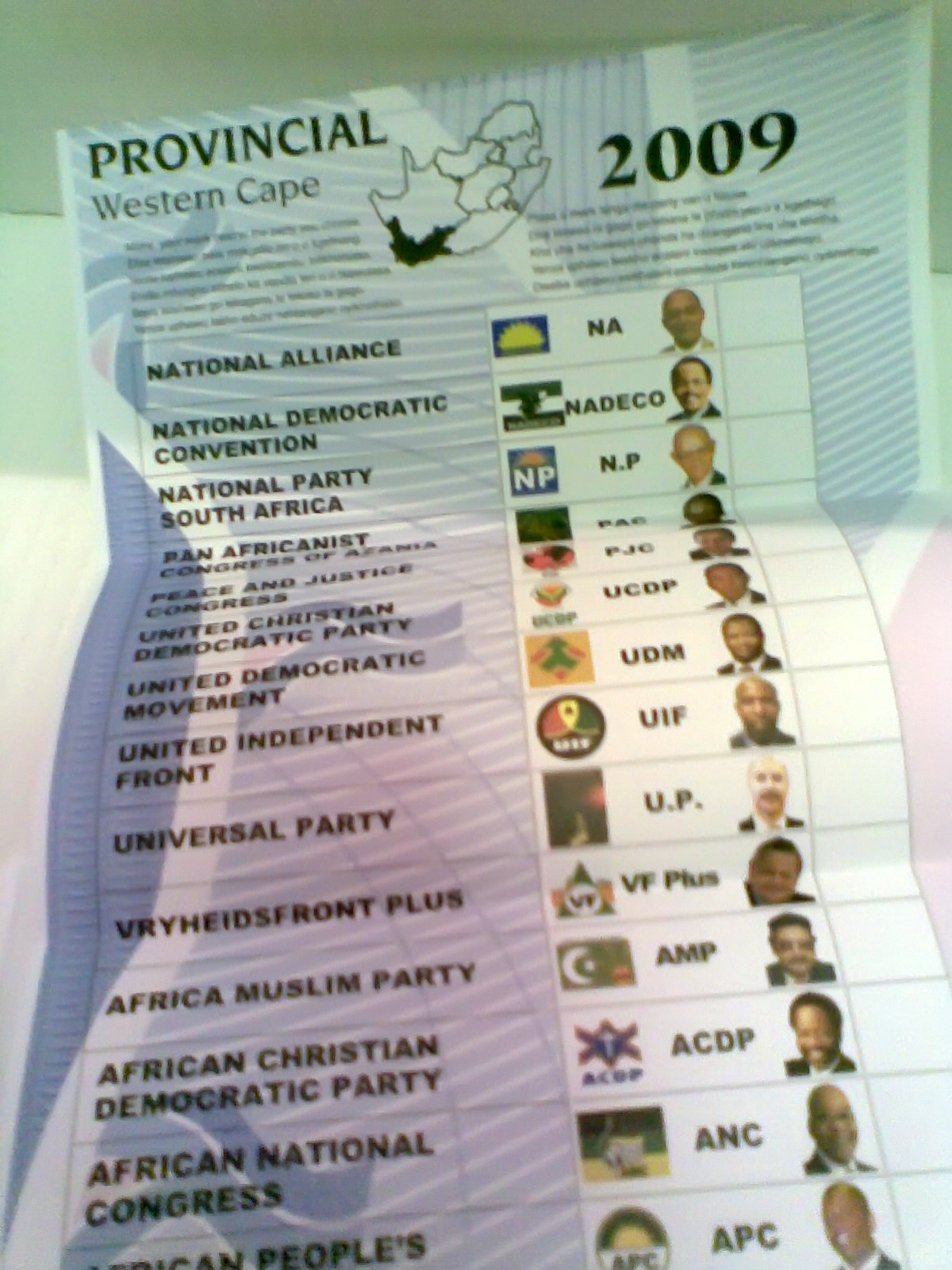
The provincial ballot paper. A total of 22 political parties contested the election.

The African National Congress (ANC) held a majority at the end of the outgoing provincial parliament. As a result of the election, the official opposition Democratic Alliance (DA) were elected to a majority government under premier candidate Helen Zille in a landslide victory. The DA formed the provincial government for the first time in its history, displacing the ANC, who came in second and consequently assumed the title of the official opposition in the province. The ANC had won a plurality of seats in the 2004 election and became the governing party. The Independent Democrats (ID) were replaced as the third-largest party by the ANC breakaway party, the Congress of the People (COPE).

The politics of the Western Cape are more complex than the rest of South Africa, as the province is more hotly-contested each election cycle compared to other provinces and voters had elected hung provincial parliaments since the 1994 elections. This election marked the first time since the end of apartheid that a party achieved a majority of seats in the provincial parliament. Analysts suggest that the ANC-COPE split made it easier for the DA to win the province.

In the run-up to the election, analysts suggested that the DA would perform strongly in the province, with some expecting the party to dislodge the ANC from government. On 25 April, the Independent Electoral Commission (IEC) project that the party would win the province with an overall majority.

DA leader and premier candidate, Helen Zille, was elected and sworn into office on 6 May 2009. Former premier Lynne Brown assumed the post of leader of the opposition.

As of 2024, the Democratic Alliance (DA) has won ever single Western Cape provincial election since.

== Results ==
Party	Votes	%	Seats	+/–
Democratic Alliance	1,012,568	51.46	22	+10
African National Congress	620,918	31.55	14	−5
Congress of the People	152,356	7.74	3	New
Independent Democrats	92,116	4.68	2	−1
African Christian Democratic Party	28,995	1.47	1	−1
United Democratic Movement	14,013	0.71	0	−1
Al Jama-ah	9,039	0.46	0	New
Freedom Front Plus	8,384	0.43	0	0
Pan Africanist Congress	4,467	0.23	0	0
Africa Muslim Party	4,333	0.22	0	0
Christian Democratic Alliance	3,987	0.20	0	0
National Party South Africa	3,378	0.17	0	New
Cape Party	2,552	0.13	0	New
National Alliance	1,996	0.10	0	New
African People's Convention	1,778	0.09	0	New
United Christian Democratic Party	1,552	0.08	0	0
Azanian People's Organisation	1,291	0.07	0	0
United Independent Front	1,178	0.06	0	New
Inkatha Freedom Party	1,158	0.06	0	0
Peace and Justice Congress	630	0.03	0	0
Universal Party	599	0.03	0	0
National Democratic Convention	463	0.02	0	New
Total	1,967,751	100.00	42	0
Valid votes	1,967,751	98.99		
Invalid/blank votes	20,026	1.01		
Total votes	1,987,777	100.00		
Registered voters/turnout	2,634,439	75.45		
Source: Election Resources
