= Western Cape Provincial Parliament =

Legislature of the Western Cape Province in South Africa

Western Cape Provincial Parliament Wes-Kaapse Provinsiale Parlement (Afrikaans) iPalamente yePhondo leNtshona Koloni (Xhosa)
- 7th Parliament

Type
- Type: Unicameral

Leadership
- Speaker: Daylin Mitchell, DA since 12 December 2022
- Deputy Speaker: Reagen Allen, DA since 13 June 2024
- Premier: Alan Winde, DA since 22 May 2019
- Leader of the Opposition: Muhammad Khalid Sayed, ANC since 13 June 2024

Structure
- Seats: 42
- Political groups: Government (24): DA (24); Official Opposition (8): ANC (8); Other parties (10): PA (3); EFF (2); NCC (1); FF+ (1); Al Jama-ah (1); ACDP (1); Good (1)

Elections
- Voting system: Party-list proportional representation
- Last election: 29 May 2024

Meeting place
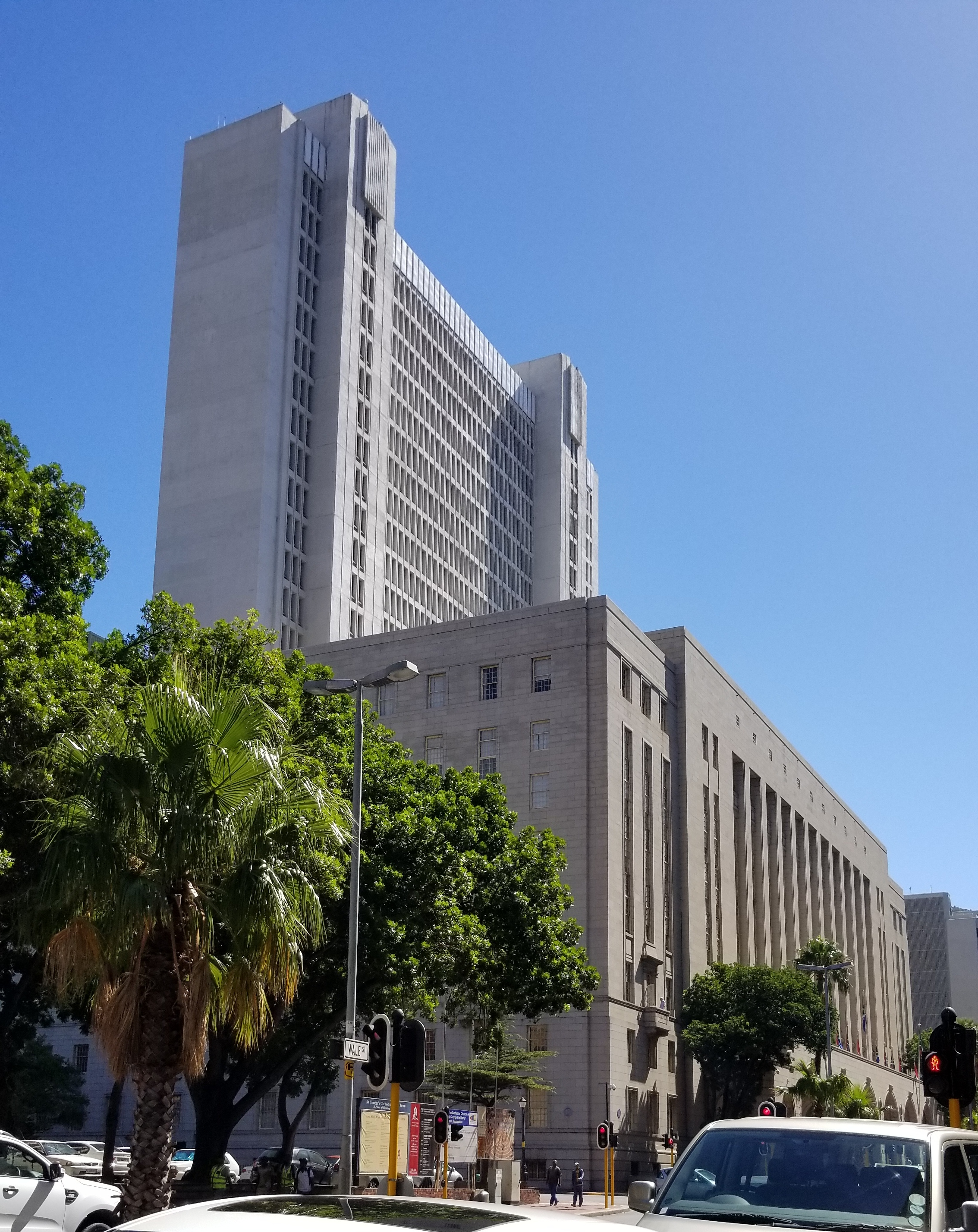
- Provincial Legislature Building, 7 Wale Street, Cape Town CBD, Cape Town, South Africa

Website
- www.wcpp.gov.za

The Western Cape Provincial Parliament (WCPP) is the legislature of the Western Cape province of South Africa. It is located in the Provincial Legislature Building, at 7 Wale Street in Cape Town's CBD.

The Provincial Parliament, along with the other provincial legislatures of South Africa, exists by virtue of Chapter 6 of the Constitution of South Africa and Chapter 3 of the Constitution of the Western Cape. It is unicameral, and consists of 42 members elected by a system of party-list proportional representation.

The Western Cape is unique amongst the provinces of South Africa in calling its legislature the "Provincial Parliament" and the members Members of Provincial Parliament (MPPs). The other provinces use the terms "Provincial Legislature" and "Members of the Provincial Legislature".

The Seventh Provincial Parliament was elected on 29 May 2024 in South Africa's 2024 general elections. A majority of the members belong to the Democratic Alliance.

== Powers ==
The Provincial Parliament is modelled on the Westminster system. The executive head of the provincial government, the Premier of the Western Cape, is elected by the Members of the Provincial Parliament from amongst themselves; conventionally the Premier will be the leader of the largest party in the parliament. The Premier then chooses the members of the Provincial Cabinet, who must also be MPPs. The Provincial Parliament also has the power to force the Premier and Cabinet to resign, by passing a motion of no confidence.

The legislative power of the Provincial Parliament is restricted to certain fields enumerated in the national Constitution; in some of these fields, the power is shared with the national Parliament. The fields on which the Provincial Parliament may legislate include health care, primary and secondary education, agriculture, transport, and land use planning. It also controls the budget of the provincial government departments.

Legislation may be introduced by any member, except for money bills, which may be introduced only by the Provincial Minister of Finance. Laws passed by the Provincial Parliament must be signed by the Premier before coming into effect. The Premier may refer a bill back to Parliament for reconsideration if she or he believes it is unconstitutional. If the Parliament re-passes it, then the Premier must either sign it or refer it to the Constitutional Court, which can make a final decision on its constitutionality.

== Election ==
The provincial legislature consists of 42 members, who are elected through a system of party list proportional representation with closed lists. In other words, each voter casts a vote for one political party, and seats in the legislature are allocated to the parties in proportion to the number of votes received. The seats are then filled by members in accordance with lists submitted by the parties before the election.

The legislature is elected for a term of five years unless it is dissolved early. This may occur if the legislature votes to dissolve and it is at least three years since the last election, or if the Premiership falls vacant and the legislature fails to elect a new Premier within ninety days. By convention, all nine provincial legislatures and the National Assembly are elected on the same day.

The most recent election was held on 29 May 2024. The following table summarizes the results.

Party	Votes	Vote %	Seats
DA	1,088,423	55.30	24
ANC	384,853	19.55	8
PA	153,607	7.80	3
EFF	104,354	5.30	2
NCC	46,770	2.38	1
VF+	28,471	1.45	1
Al Jama-ah	25,537	1.30	1
ACDP	25,363	1.29	1
Good	22,207	1.13	1
Other parties	78,724	4.50	0
Total		100.0	42

The following table shows the composition of the provincial parliament after past elections and floor-crossing periods.

Event	ACDP	ALJ	ANC	DP/DA	COPE	EFF	FF/FF+	GOOD	ID	NCC	NP/NNP	NLP	UDM	UIF
1994 election	1	—	14	3	—	—	1	—	—	—	23	—	—	—
1999 election	1	—	18	5	—	—	0	—	—	—	17	—	1	—
2003 floor-crossing	2	—	22	7	—	—	0	—	—	—	10	1	0	—
2004 election	2	—	19	12	—	—	0	—	3	—	5	—	1	—
2005 floor-crossing	2	—	24	13	—	—	0	—	1	—	—	—	0	2
2007 floor-crossing	2	—	27	11	—	—	0	—	1	—	—	—	0	1
2009 election	1	0	14	22	3	—	0	—	2	—	—	—	0	—
2014 election	1	0	14	26	0	1	0	—	—	—	—	—	0	—
2019 election	1	1	12	24	0	2	1	1	—	—	—	—	0	—
2024 election	1	1	8	24	0	2	1	1	—	1	—	—	0	—

1994 Western Cape provincial election,

2014 Western Cape provincial election,

2019 Western Cape provincial election,

2024 Western Cape provincial election,

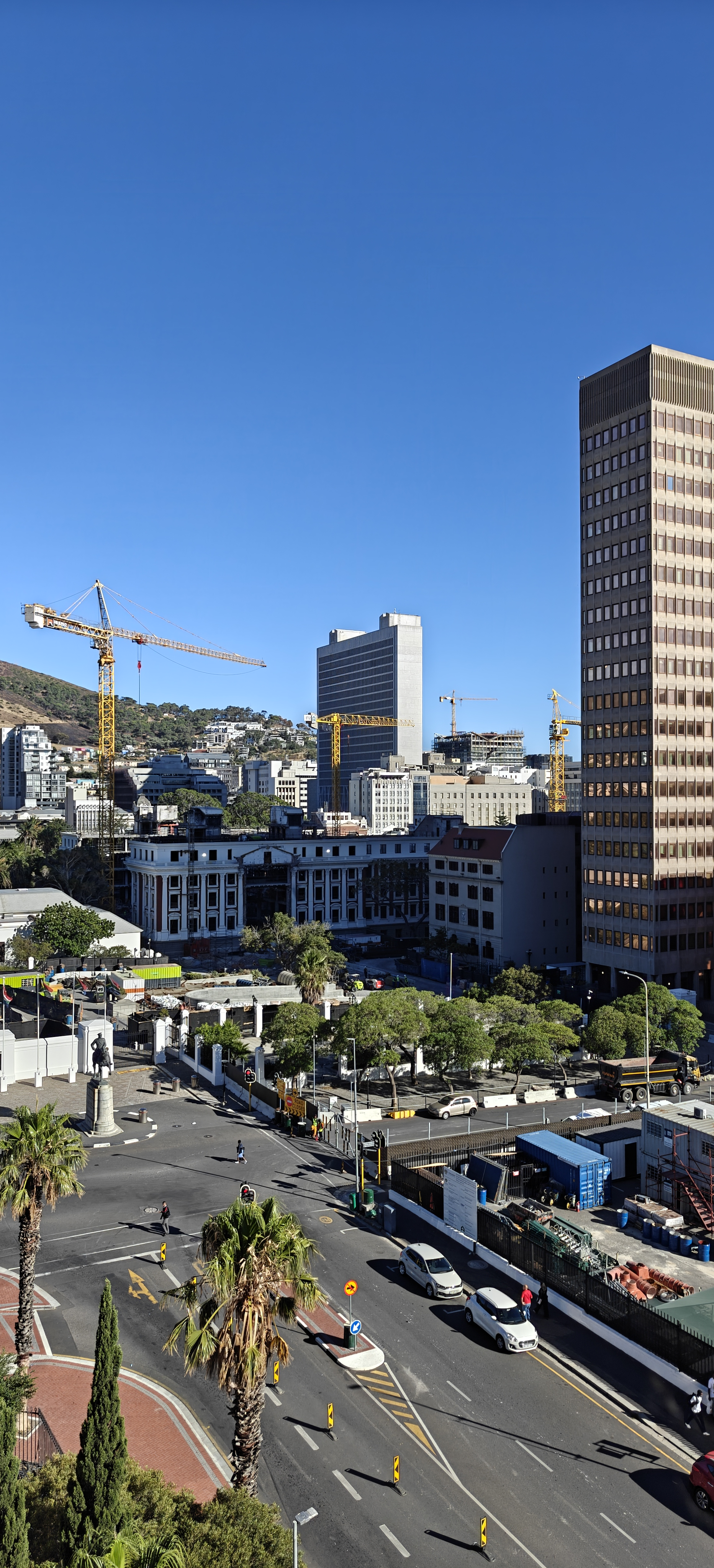
Western Cape Provincial Parliament viewed from Roeland Street, with the South African Houses of Parliament below

== Officers ==
The presiding officer of the Provincial Parliament is the Speaker, assisted by a Deputy Speaker. The Speaker position is currently held by Daylin Mitchell of the Democratic Alliance, while the Deputy Speaker is Reagen Allen also of the DA.

Apart from being the executive head of the province, the Premier also leads the governing party or coalition in the Provincial Parliament. The leader of the largest party not in government is recognised as Leader of the Opposition. As of 2019 the Premier is Alan Winde of the Democratic Alliance. Cameron Dugmore of the African National Congress is Leader of the Opposition since 2019, after Khaya Magaxa was elected to the National Assembly of South Africa.

=== List of speakers ===
Name	Entered office	Left office	Party
Willem Doman	1994	2001	NNP
Lynne Brown	2001	2004	ANC
Shaun Byneveldt	2004	2009	ANC
Shahid Esau	2009	2012	DA
Richard Majola	2012	2014	DA
Sharna Fernandez	2014	2019	DA
Masizole Mnqasela	2019	2022	DA
Daylin Mitchell	2022	Present	DA

=== List of opposition leaders ===
Name	Entered office	Left office	Party
Theuns Botha	2004	2009	DA
Lynne Brown	2009	2014	ANC
Marius Fransman	2014	2016	ANC
Khaya Magaxa	2016	2019	ANC
Cameron Dugmore	2019	2024	ANC
Muhammad Khalid Sayed	2024	Incumbent	ANC

== Expansion ==
In February 2020, the ruling Democratic Alliance proposed increasing the number of the seats in the Provincial Parliament to between 52 and 60 seats. The proposal is supported by the African National Congress, yet it has also been denounced by Good.

== See also ==
- Provincial legislature (South Africa)
- List of members of the 7th Western Cape Provincial Parliament
- List of acts of the Western Cape Provincial Parliament
