= Hernus Kriel =

South African politician

Hermanus Jacobus Kriel

1st Premier of the Western Cape
- In office 7 May 1994 – 11 May 1998
- Preceded by: Position Established
- Succeeded by: Gerald Morkel

Minister of Law and Order
- In office 1991–1994
- Preceded by: Adriaan Vlok
- Succeeded by: Sidney Mufamadi

Personal details
- Born: 14 November 1941 Kakamas, Cape Province, South Africa (now Northern Cape)
- Died: 5 July 2015 (aged 73) Cape Town, Western Cape, South Africa
- Citizenship: South African
- Party: National
- Education: University of Stellenbosch

Hermanus Jacobus Kriel (14 November 1941 – 5 July 2015) was the first Premier of the Western Cape province. He previously served as the Minister of Law and Order in the South African government under Frederik Willem de Klerk. He was born in 1941 in Kakamas, Cape Province.

Kriel served as premier from 11 May 1994 to 11 May 1998 as a member of the National Party. He became known for having questioned the objectivity of the Truth and Reconciliation Commission and for having advocated for the return of the death penalty in South Africa.

He defected to the Democratic Party in June 2000; the DP had overtaken the NP as the official opposition in the National Assembly of South Africa after the election held the year before. He was however ranked unfavorably by the DP's electoral college, and would instead later appear on the candidate list for the small African Christian Democratic Party.

Kriel was married to Anna-Mari (née Jooste). He died on 5 July 2015, aged 73.

Political offices
Preceded by Kobus Meiring as Administrator of the Cape Province	Premier of the Western Cape; 7 May 1994 – 11 May 1998	Succeeded by Gerald Morkel
