= Politics of the Western Cape =

Local government

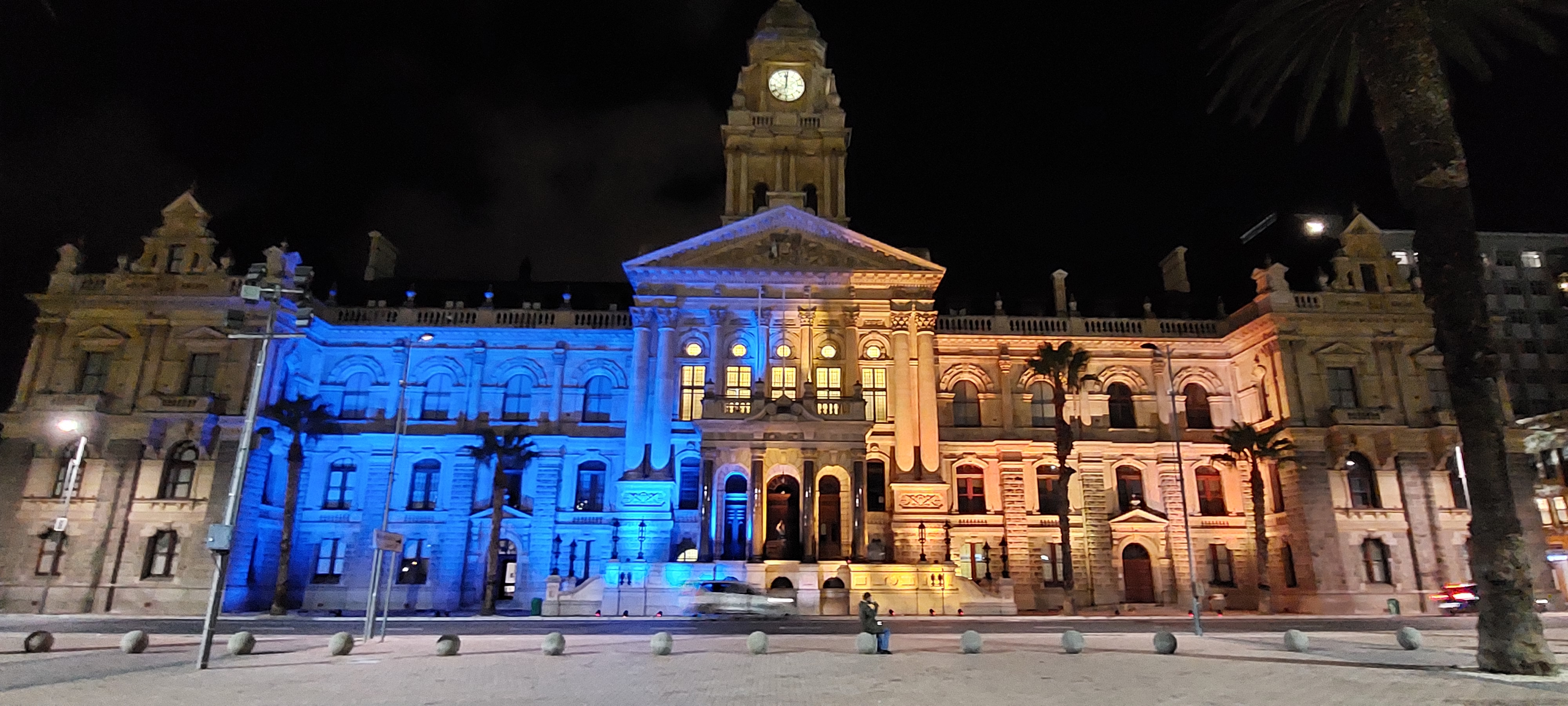
During the 2022 invasion of Ukraine by Russia the City of Cape Town lit up the City Hall in the colours of the Ukrainian flag. The Western Cape government's open support for Ukraine was in contrast to the neutral position taken by the South African government and is representative of the province's different political norms.

The politics of the Western Cape differs from that of most other provinces in South Africa, because, unlike the other provinces, the African National Congress (ANC) does not dominate the political landscape. Instead, the province is a stronghold for the Democratic Alliance (DA), which has won a majority of the vote in the province in every national, provincial, and municipal election since 2009. The Western Cape's political landscape is also notable for the presence of a relatively strong local devolution and separatist movement.

== Election history ==
In the 2004 provincial election, no party achieved an absolute majority in the province, with the ANC having a plurality of 45% of the votes. In the aftermath of the election, the ANC formed a coalition government with the New National Party (NNP), which won 11% of the vote. During the 2005 floor crossing period all of the NNP members of the Provincial Parliament defected to the ANC, giving the ANC an absolute majority in the provincial parliament. The ANC chose Ebrahim Rasool as Premier; in 2008 he was replaced by Lynne Brown.

The official opposition in the Western Cape after the 2004 provincial election was the Democratic Alliance (DA), which received 27% of the vote in the provincial ballot. The City of Cape Town, the most populous municipality in the province, was governed by a multi-party coalition led by the DA after the 2006 municipal elections. The DA increased its share of the vote during the 2011 municipal elections to 61.09%, giving them a firm majority and allowing them to govern the City of Cape Town without their former coalition partners

In the 2009 provincial election, the ANC was unseated by the DA, which took 51.46% of the vote. This election marked the first time since the end of apartheid that a party scored an overall majority in the province. DA leader Helen Zille replaced Lynne Brown as Premier on 6 May 2009.

In the 2014 provincial election, the DA maintained its hold on the province, increasing its majority to 59.4%, with Helen Zille remaining Premier.

In the 2019 provincial election, the DA won a reduced majority of 55.45%. Alan Winde of the DA replaced Helen Zille as Premier after the election.

In the 2024 provincial election, the DA was reelected for a fourth term in office with a majority of 55.30%, with Alan Winde remaining Premier.

=== Election results ===
| Party | Votes | % | +/– | Seats | +/– |
|---|---|---|---|---|---|
| Democratic Alliance | 1,088,423 | 55.58 | –0.1 | 24 | 0 |
| African National Congress | 384,853 | 19.65 | –9.1 | 8 | –4 |
| Patriotic Alliance | 153,607 | 7.84 | New | 3 | New |
| Economic Freedom Fighters | 104,354 | 5.33 | +1.3 | 2 | 0 |
| National Coloured Congress | 46,770 | 2.39 | New | 1 | New |
| Freedom Front Plus | 28,471 | 1.45 | -0.1 | 1 | 0 |
| Al Jama-ah | 25,537 | 1.30 | +0.4 | 1 | 0 |
| African Christian Democratic Party | 25,363 | 1.30 | -1.4 | 1 | 0 |
| Good | 22,207 | 1.13 | -1.9 | 1 | 0 |
| uMkhonto we Sizwe | 11,263 | 0.58 | New | 0 | New |
| Rise Mzansi | 9,954 | 0.51 | New | 0 | New |
| Africa Restoration Alliance | 8,318 | 0.42 | New | 0 | New |
| Build One South Africa | 8,028 | 0.41 | New | 0 | New |
| Pan Africanist Congress | 6,151 | 0.31 | +0.1 | 0 | 0 |
| United Democratic Movement | 5,933 | 0.30 | 0 | 0 | 0 |
| ActionSA | 5,788 | 0.30 | New | 0 | New |
| African Transformation Movement | 5,581 | 0.28 | 0 | 0 | 0 |
| Referendum Party | 5,110 | 0.26 | New | 0 | New |
| People's Movement for Change | 5,074 | 0.26 | New | 0 | New |
| Allied Movement for Change | 5,065 | 0.26 | New | 0 | New |
| Allied of Citizens for Change | 2,430 | 0.12 | New | 0 | New |
| Total | 1,958,280 | 100.00 | – | 42 | – |
| Valid votes | 1,958,280 | 99.25 | | | |
| Invalid/blank votes | 14,874 | 0.75 | | | |
| Total votes | 1,973,154 | 100.00 | | | |
| Registered voters/turnout | 3,317,072 | 59.48 | | | |
Source: Daily Maverick and News24

== Cape Town ==
The City of Cape Town stands in contrast to other metropolitan areas in South Africa in terms of its politics. Cape Town has been run by the Democratic Alliance (DA) almost every year since 2000. With the exception of a single mayoral term, there has been a DA mayor in office since that same year. Cape Town is considered a DA stronghold, and the center of the party's support. The party maintains its Federal headquarters in the suburb of Gardens.

In recent years, the City has been strongly in favor of the devolution of various powers, pushing for less control over the metro by the national government, with the aim of gaining more direct control over its own affairs.

For example, the City has for numerous years lobbied for greater policing powers, stating that the South African Police Service (SAPS) does not fulfill its mandate. Cape Town has a robust policing structure of its own, including City of Cape Town Law Enforcement (Metro Police), LEAP officers, the Law Enforcement Auxiliary Service (LEAS), the Strategic Surveillance Unit (SSU), and the local Traffic Service (including the Highway Patrol, Flying Squad, and Ghost Squad). The City also has over 50 Improvement Districts, which are public private partnerships aimed at ensuring community safety in their respective areas of operation.

The City has also shifted away from the national water supply, striving for water independence. This shift includes building a major desalination plant.

Likewise, there has been a growing shift away from the national electricity grid in Cape Town, with a transition towards renewable energy sources, and less reliance on state power producer Eskom.

The City has also spent many years lobbying for full control of its own commuter rail operations. Commuter rail has historically been administered by national operator PRASA, through regional Metrorail entities. However, the City of Cape Town has said the local service is mismanaged. In December 2025, the City approved a Rail Business Plan, with the goal of gaining control of local Metrorail services. The approval laid the path to formally approaching the national Department of Transport with a memorandum requesting that commuter rail operations be devolved to the metro.

== See also ==
- Cape Independence
- Politics of South Africa
- Government of the Western Cape
