= Bitou Local Municipality elections =

Local elections in the Western Cape, South Africa

The Bitou Local Municipality council consists of thirteen members elected by mixed-member proportional representation. Seven councillors are elected by first-past-the-post voting in seven wards, while the remaining six are chosen from party lists so that the total number of party representatives is proportional to the number of votes received. In the election of 18 May 2011 no party obtained a majority; the Democratic Alliance (DA) and the African National Congress (ANC) won six seats each, with the remaining seat going to the Congress of the People (COPE). The DA and COPE formed a coalition to govern the municipality.

The DA won a ward from the ANC in a by-election held in 2014, and governed Bitou alone with an outright majority of seats on the council.

A hung council was elected following the 2016 municipal elections, with the DA and ANC each winning six seats, and the final seat going to the Active United Front (AUF). The AUF chose to join forces with the ANC. However, six months later, in April 2017, the AUF announced that the partnership had fallen apart because the ANC had frustrated attempts to establish clean administration, had failed to commit resources to address problems, had not implemented the coalition agreement, and had not signed the agreed-upon service delivery plan. The DA and AUF negotiated for a month, following which the DA gained control of the municipality.

== Results ==
The following table shows the composition of the council after past elections.

Event	ANC	DA	Other	Total
2000 election	6	4	0	10
2002 floor-crossing	6	2	2	10
2004 floor-crossing	7	2	1	10
2006 election	7	3	1	11
2011 election	6	6	1	13
2016 election	6	6	1	13
2021 election	4	5	4	13
2026 election	3	5	5	13

== December 2000 election ==
The following table shows the results of the 2000 election.

Party	Ward			List			Total seats
Party	Votes	%	Seats	Votes	%	Seats	Total seats
African National Congress	5,400	59.85	3	5,525	61.94	3	6
Democratic Alliance	3,290	36.46	2	3,395	38.06	2	4
Independent candidates	333	3.69	0				0
Total	9,023	100.00	5	8,920	100.00	5	10
Valid votes	9,023	97.45		8,920	96.63		
Invalid/blank votes	236	2.55		311	3.37		
Total votes	9,259	100.00		9,231	100.00		
Registered voters/turnout	13,797	67.11		13,797	66.91		

=== October 2002 floor crossing ===
In terms of the Eighth Amendment of the Constitution and the judgment of the Constitutional Court in United Democratic Movement v President of the Republic of South Africa and Others, in the period from 8–22 October 2002 councillors had the opportunity to cross the floor to a different political party without losing their seats.

In the Plettenberg Bay council, one councillor crossed from the Democratic Alliance (DA) to the New National Party (NNP), which had formerly been part of the DA, and another councillor left the DA to sit as an independent.

Party	Seats before	Net change	Seats after
African National Congress	6	0	6
Democratic Alliance	4	▼2	2
New National Party	—	▲1	1
Independent	—	▲1	1

=== September 2004 floor crossing ===
Another floor-crossing period occurred on 1–15 September 2004, in which the NNP councillor crossed to the ANC.

Party	Seats before	Net change	Seats after
African National Congress	6	▲1	7
Democratic Alliance	2	0	2
New National Party	1	▼1	0
Independent	1	0	1

== March 2006 election ==
The following table shows the results of the 2006 election.

Party	Ward			List			Total seats
Party	Votes	%	Seats	Votes	%	Seats	Total seats
African National Congress	7,143	60.20	5	7,072	59.84	2	7
Democratic Alliance	3,582	30.19	1	3,690	31.22	2	3
Independent Democrats	729	6.14	0	741	6.27	1	1
United Democratic Movement	120	1.01	0	148	1.25	0	0
Independent candidates	203	1.71	0				0
United Independent Front	67	0.56	0	66	0.56	0	0
African Christian Democratic Party	21	0.18	0	102	0.86	0	0
Total	11,865	100.00	6	11,819	100.00	5	11
Valid votes	11,865	98.78		11,819	98.44		
Invalid/blank votes	147	1.22		187	1.56		
Total votes	12,012	100.00		12,006	100.00		
Registered voters/turnout	19,167	62.67		19,167	62.64		

=== By-elections from May 2011 to August 2016 ===
The following by-elections were held to fill vacant ward seats in the period between the elections in March 2006 and May 2011.

Date	Ward	Party of the previous councillor	Party of the newly elected councillor
26 September 2007	6	African National Congress	Independent (Note: The former councillor was re-elected to the ward as an independent.)
24 June 2009	4	Democratic Alliance	Democratic Alliance

== May 2011 election ==
The following table shows the results of the 2011 election.

Party	Ward			List			Total seats
Party	Votes	%	Seats	Votes	%	Seats	Total seats
Democratic Alliance	7,950	45.77	2	8,552	49.35	4	6
African National Congress	7,825	45.05	5	7,955	45.91	1	6
Congress of the People	466	2.68	0	473	2.73	1	1
Independent candidates	780	4.49	0				0
African Christian Democratic Party	295	1.70	0	277	1.60	0	0
Plettenberg Bay Community Forum	34	0.20	0	48	0.28	0	0
Cape Independence Party	21	0.12	0	23	0.13	0	0
Total	17,371	100.00	7	17,328	100.00	6	13
Valid votes	17,371	98.59		17,328	98.63		
Invalid/blank votes	249	1.41		241	1.37		
Total votes	17,620	100.00		17,569	100.00		
Registered voters/turnout	24,975	70.55		24,975	70.35		

=== By-elections from May 2011 to August 2016 ===
The following by-elections were held to fill vacant ward seats in the period between the elections in May 2011 and August 2016.

Date	Ward	Party of the previous councillor	Party of the newly elected councillor
5 December 2012	2	Democratic Alliance	Democratic Alliance
7 August 2013	4	African National Congress	African National Congress
17 September 2014	7	African National Congress	Democratic Alliance

== August 2016 election ==
The following table shows the results of the 2016 election.

Party	Ward			List			Total seats
Party	Votes	%	Seats	Votes	%	Seats	Total seats
Democratic Alliance	9,141	48.60	4	9,141	48.56	2	6
African National Congress	7,746	41.19	3	7,673	40.76	3	6
Active United Front	1,026	5.46	0	989	5.25	1	1
Economic Freedom Fighters	353	1.88	0	338	1.80	0	0
African Christian Democratic Party	205	1.09	0	210	1.12	0	0
African Independent Congress	148	0.79	0	263	1.40	0	0
Congress of the People	93	0.49	0	87	0.46	0	0
Bitou Independent Party	51	0.27	0	62	0.33	0	0
United Democratic Movement	19	0.10	0	41	0.22	0	0
Democratic New Civic Association	16	0.09	0	11	0.06	0	0
Independent Civic Organisation of South Africa	9	0.05	0	8	0.04	0	0
Total	18,807	100.00	7	18,823	100.00	6	13
Valid votes	18,807	99.05		18,823	98.97		
Invalid/blank votes	181	0.95		195	1.03		
Total votes	18,988	100.00		19,018	100.00		
Registered voters/turnout	27,867	68.14		27,867	68.25		

=== By-elections from August 2016 to November 2021 ===
The following by-elections were held to fill vacant ward seats in the period between the elections in August 2016 and November 2021.

Date	Ward	Party of the previous councillor	Party of the newly elected councillor
5 April 2017	2	Democratic Alliance	Democratic Alliance

== November 2021 election ==
The following table shows the results of the 2021 election.

Party	Ward			List			Total seats
Party	Votes	%	Seats	Votes	%	Seats	Total seats
Democratic Alliance	7,914	40.22	3	7,921	40.50	2	5
African National Congress	5,685	28.89	3	5,726	29.28	1	4
Active United Front	1,806	9.18	0	1,738	8.89	1	1
Plett Democratic Congress	1,335	6.78	1	1,219	6.23	0	1
Patriotic Alliance	1,125	5.72	0	1,118	5.72	1	1
Ikhwezi Political Movement	610	3.10	0	645	3.30	1	1
Economic Freedom Fighters	299	1.52	0	269	1.38	0	0
Socialist Revolutionary Workers Party	160	0.81	0	147	0.75	0	0
African Transformation Movement	145	0.74	0	144	0.74	0	0
African Christian Democratic Party	107	0.54	0	128	0.65	0	0
Good	104	0.53	0	106	0.54	0	0
Bitou Concerned Residents	91	0.46	0	100	0.51	0	0
The Organic Humanity Movement	86	0.44	0	71	0.36	0	0
Citizens Rights Protection Unity	76	0.39	0	71	0.36	0	0
Pan Africanist Congress of Azania	48	0.24	0	56	0.29	0	0
Cape Independence Party	46	0.23	0	50	0.26	0	0
Africa Restoration Alliance	35	0.18	0	26	0.13	0	0
Dagga Party	5	0.03	0	21	0.11	0	0
Total	19,677	100.00	7	19,556	100.00	6	13
Valid votes	19,677	98.96		19,556	98.89		
Invalid/blank votes	207	1.04		219	1.11		
Total votes	19,884	100.00		19,775	100.00		
Registered voters/turnout	30,863	64.43		30,863	64.07		

== November 2026 election ==
The following table shows the results of the 2026 election.

Party	Ward			List			Total seats
Party	Votes	%	Seats	Votes	%	Seats	Total seats
Democratic Alliance	7,897	36.03	3	8,345	37.59	2	5
African National Congress	4,374	19.96	3	4,446	20.03	0	3
Active United Front	2,137	9.75	0	2,052	9.24	1	1
Plett Democratic Congress	1,648	7.52	1	1,586	7.14	0	1
Ikhwezi Political Movement	1,360	6.20	0	1,324	5.96	1	1
Patriotic Alliance	1,292	5.89	0	1,299	5.85	1	1
Freedom Front Plus	1,236	5.64	0	1,090	4.91	1	1
Non Aligned Civic Movement	707	3.23	0	698	3.14	0	0
Economic Freedom Fighters	301	1.37	0	329	1.48	0	0
South African Communist Party	300	1.37	0	279	1.26	0	0
African Christian Democratic Party	139	0.63	0	197	0.89	0	0
African Transformation Movement	167	0.76	0	157	0.71	0	0
Pro-Poor Political Movement	65	0.30	0	83	0.37	0	0
Youth Party	50	0.23	0	94	0.42	0	0
Afrika Mayibuye Movement	67	0.31	0	49	0.22	0	0
Pan Africanist Congress of Azania	55	0.25	0	57	0.26	0	0
uMkhonto weSizwe Party	49	0.22	0	53	0.24	0	0
Organic Humanity Movement	48	0.22	0	42	0.19	0	0
Cape Independence Party	26	0.12	0	22	0.10	0	0
Total	21,918	100.00	7	22,202	100.00	6	13
Valid votes	21,918	99.09		22,202	99.24		
Invalid/blank votes	202	0.91		169	0.76		
Total votes	22,120	100.00		22,371	100.00		
Registered voters/turnout	35,941	61.55		35,941	62.24		
