= Phil Craig (South African politician) =

21st-century politician

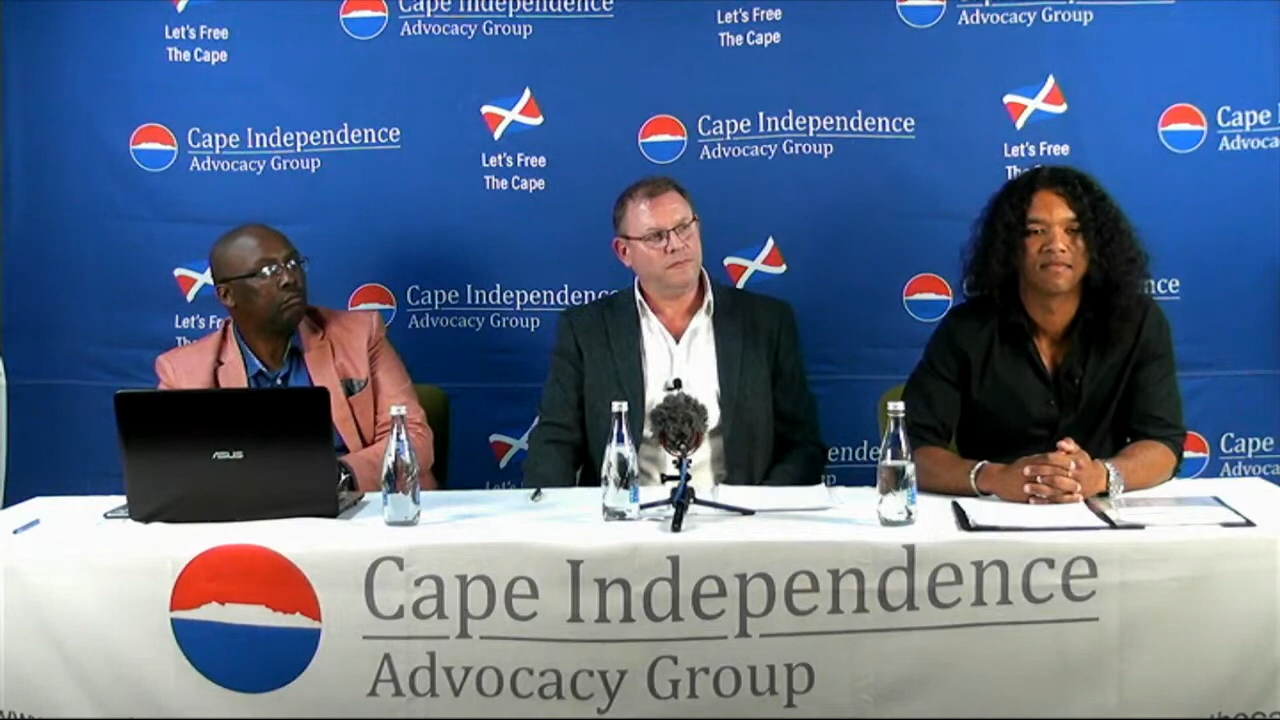
- Craig in 2023

Leader of the Referendum Party Founder of the Referendum Party
- In office 9 November 2023 – 25 March 2026

Personal details
- Born: United Kingdom
- Party: Referendum Party (2023–2026)
- Occupation: Politician
- Website: http://www.referendumparty.org/

Phil Craig is a South African politician, entrepreneur, and key figure in the Cape independence movement. In April 2020, Craig helped found the Cape Independence Advocacy Group, a non-profit advocacy organization. Later in November 2023, Craig along with others co-founded the Referendum Party, of which he served as leader of until its merger into the Freedom Front Plus in March 2026.

== Cape Independence Advocacy Group ==
Following his emigration from the United Kingdom to South Africa in 2004, Craig co-founded in the Cape Independence Advocacy Group (CIAG) in 2020. Since 2020, the CIAG's primary function has been to promote the idea of the Western Cape seceding from South Africa.

Craig is the CIAG's most prominent public figure, regularly representing the organisation in media engagements, writing in the media, and speaking publicly including at the Cape Town Press Club, the Biz News Conference, and at the Afriforum Annual Conference. He was the primary author of the Freedom Front Plus's (FF Plus) Western Cape Peoples Bill, appearing before the Western Cape Provincial Parliament when it was debated in the committee stage, and along with the Democratic Alliance, established the Western Cape Devolution Working Group.

A key feature of the CIAG's activities had been lobbying the Democratic Alliance (DA) and Alan Winde, the premier of the Western Cape, to facilitate a referendum on independence in the Western Cape. However, due to Winde's opposition to the process of a referendum, along with the opposition of others like the mayor of Cape Town, Geordin Hill-Lewis, Craig has subsequently advocated for a referendum on Cape independence to be held privately, using the 2014 Venetian independence referendum as a comparison.

In April 2025, Craig led a delegation to the United States to lobby the American government on the issue of Cape independence. On 3 September 2025, the Home Affairs Committee of the National Assembly of South Africa received and debated a legal opinion on whether his right to reside in South Africa could be withdrawn, with the legal opinion concluding that Craig was not acting outside the law. DA MP Adrian Roos defended Craig asserting that he appeared to have done nothing wrong and that freedom of expression was protected by the Constitution. In January 2026, Minister in the Presidency Khumbudzo Ntshavheni responded to MK Party MP Thalente Khubeka who wanted to know why Craig had not been classified as a terrorist. Nsthavheni stated that there were no findings that the actions or agenda of either Craig or the CIAG met the threshold of terrorism.

In March 2026, Craig and FF Plus leader Dr Corné Mulder announced that their two organisations has signed a formal cooperation agreement. In September 2026, Craig published a legal paper on self-determination in South Africa, asserting that when it came to peremptory norms (jus cogens) of international law, of which self-determination is one, the South African Constitution is not supreme. The paper focused on policing in the Western Cape, control of single-medium Afrikaans schools, and fiscal autonomy for both the Western Cape and cultural communities, all of which Craig asserted could be demanded by right.

== Referendum Party ==
In November 2023, Craig founded in the Referendum Party to contest in the 2024 general election, with the party advocating for self-determination, non-racialism, a referendum vote on independence, and positioning itself as an alternative to voters unsatisfied with the DA's opposition to a referendum vote. In 2024, the Referendum Party obtained 0.26% of the provincial vote in the Western Cape, a result which Craig publicly considered to be disappointing but also attributed to the party being less than a year old. Since then, the Referendum Party has broadened in policy agenda in preparation for the 2026 municipal elections and the next general election.

In March 2026 the party voted to merge into the Freedom Front Plus.
