= Cape Independence Party =

Political party in South Africa

Cape Independence Party - CAPEXIT
- Abbreviation: CAPEXIT
- Leader: Jack Miller
- Founded: 2007
- Headquarters: Cape Town
- Ideology: Cape independence Social democracy Right-wing libertarianism Economic interest
- Political position: Right-wing
- Colours: Blue, White and Red
- Slogan: It's time for CAPEXIT
- Cape Town City Council: 2 / 231

Party flag
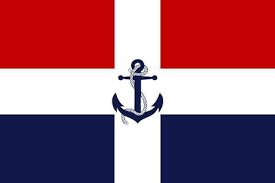

Website
- www.capexitparty.com

The Cape Independence Party (CAPEXIT) (Afrikaans: Kaapse Onafhanklikheids Party), previously called the Cape Party, is a political party in South Africa which seeks to use all constitutional and legal means to bring about Cape independence, which includes the entire Western Cape, Northern Cape (excluding two districts), six municipalities in the Eastern Cape, and one municipality in the Free State. The area includes all municipalities in those provinces with an Afrikaans-speaking majority. In 2009, it was claimed to have had a membership of approximately 1,000 people across South Africa, but official membership figures are not made public. The party currently holds two seats on the Cape Town City Council.

It is registered with the Independent Electoral Commission (IEC) and was on the provincial ballot of the Western Cape in the South African general elections of 2009, where it received 2,552 votes. It again contested in the municipal elections of 2016, where it received 4,473 votes. In the elections of 2019, it received 9,331 votes.

The party did not compete in the 2024 South African general election after failing to meet the IEC's new signature requirements as stipulated in the 2023 Electoral Amendment Bill. Fellow pro-independence parties, the Freedom Front Plus (FF+) and newly formed Referendum Party (RP) did contest the elections.

== Formation and early years ==
The party grew out of a Facebook group in 2007, and is led by Jack Miller, a Cape Town businessman. On 17 March 2009, the young party's website was defaced by vandals. The website was replaced with an image of a "black devil" and the words "fuck off". Jack Miller, the party leader, alleged that the attack would have required a great deal of funding and equipment, and claimed that it had been perpetrated by one of South Africa's two largest political parties, the African National Congress or the Democratic Alliance. The attack was investigated by the IEC, which has come to no conclusions.

In 2009, the Cape Party petitioned the Independent Electoral Commission to reject the registration of another political party, the recently formed Congress of the People, on the grounds that the abbreviation of their name (Cope) could cause confusion between the two parties amongst voters, which is against the IEC's regulations. The IEC rejected the objection.

In 2010, the Cape Party announced its support for the Thembu clan, whose chief has said that the clan is seeking autonomy for the clan's territory east of the Fish River. King Buyelekhaya Dalindyebo had announced the plan after his 15-year conviction for violent crime. After discussions within the royal family, the plan was suspended shortly after.

=== Fuck White People Court case ===
During 2017, the Cape Party instituted an application to have a poster, which was covered with the words "Fuck White People" in black-and-white all caps letters, on display since 2016 alongside a chair and "goldendeanboots" as part of an exhibition called The Art of Disruptions at the Cape Town gallery, declared hate speech.

The work was created by Dean Hutton, who wore a suit with the same print publicly before Iziko approached them. Some members approached the art gallery and placed a sticker over the poster that read "love thy neighbour". For this, the gallery charged them criminally for damage to property. In the incident, the party members who defaced the poster were documented accosting and physically manhandling Iziko staff members in their attempts to stop the party's actions.

The application was heard in the Equality Court of South Africa in Cape Town in terms of the Regulations Relating to the Promotion of Equality and Prevention of Unfair Discrimination Act. However, the Court declared that the words "Fuck white people" were not hate speech.

=== Land expropriation without compensation ===
On 13 June 2018, the Cape Party lodged a complaint with the South African Human Rights Commission (SAHRC) to have the parliamentary resolution on land expropriation declared a crime against humanity.

The Cape Party stated that South Africa is signatory to numerous international treaties which safeguard property rights, Standing in front of the SAHRC offices in Cape Town, leader of the Cape Party, Jack Miller said: "There is another word for state expropriation without compensation; it is quite simply theft in the most criminal sense." The Cape Party stated that the resolution is in contravention of international law and cited such examples as the Universal Declaration of Human Rights Article 17 (2): "No one shall be arbitrarily deprived of his or her property." And that it is taking the issue to the International Court of Justice.

The Cape Party stated that one permanent solution to this communist South African government action is the Secession of the Western Cape to form the Cape of Good Hope.

=== 2021 election recount ===
In the 2021 elections the party obtained 17,881 votes overall and obtained 1 seat in the City of Cape town. The party received reports from voters that they had voted at certain voting stations but that the results for those stations were showing 0 votes for the Cape Independence Party signed affidavits were obtained from voters and submitted to the IEC. The IEC refused a recount, so the Cape Independence Party appealed to the Electoral court and won. After the recount the party's votes totaled 19,180; with the party awarded a second seat in the city council and the Democratic Alliance losing a seat that they had been previously awarded.

== Platform ==
The party maintains that the population of the Western Cape and parts of surrounding provinces (which it calls the Cape Nation), is culturally and linguistically distinct from the rest of South Africa, and is therefore entitled to statehood under chapter 14, section 235 of the South African Constitution. The party says the Republic of South Africa is a colonial construct, and that the Cape would be better off if it separated from South Africa. It claims that the national government and legislative apparatus are racist and totalitarian, and has referred to President Jacob Zuma as an illegitimate occupier of the Cape. They have cited black economic empowerment, affirmative action and housing allocation policies as examples of the national government's racist policies.

=== Economics ===
The party cites the Division of Revenue Act in which 78% of revenue raised in the province never returns and that taxpayers pay R3.5 billion per week to the South African treasury. The province, the second wealthiest in South Africa, would be more economically successful if these revenues were spent within its borders.

The Cape Party has said that it occupies a unique position, as it focuses on local issues, instead of attempting to contest power in national elections, which would legitimise the national political machinery.

The party maintains that representative democracy has failed and proposes a system of direct democracy where the electorate are consulted in referendums before passing laws. It also supports the ability of individual communities and cultural groups to determine the laws that govern them. It supports free ports, and has suggested turning its prospective republic into a tax haven.

== Policies ==
The three main policies that the Cape party envisage for the Cape of Good Hope, which will have bearing on all other policies are their Canton political system, direct democracy electoral system and Singaporean economic system.

== Election results ==
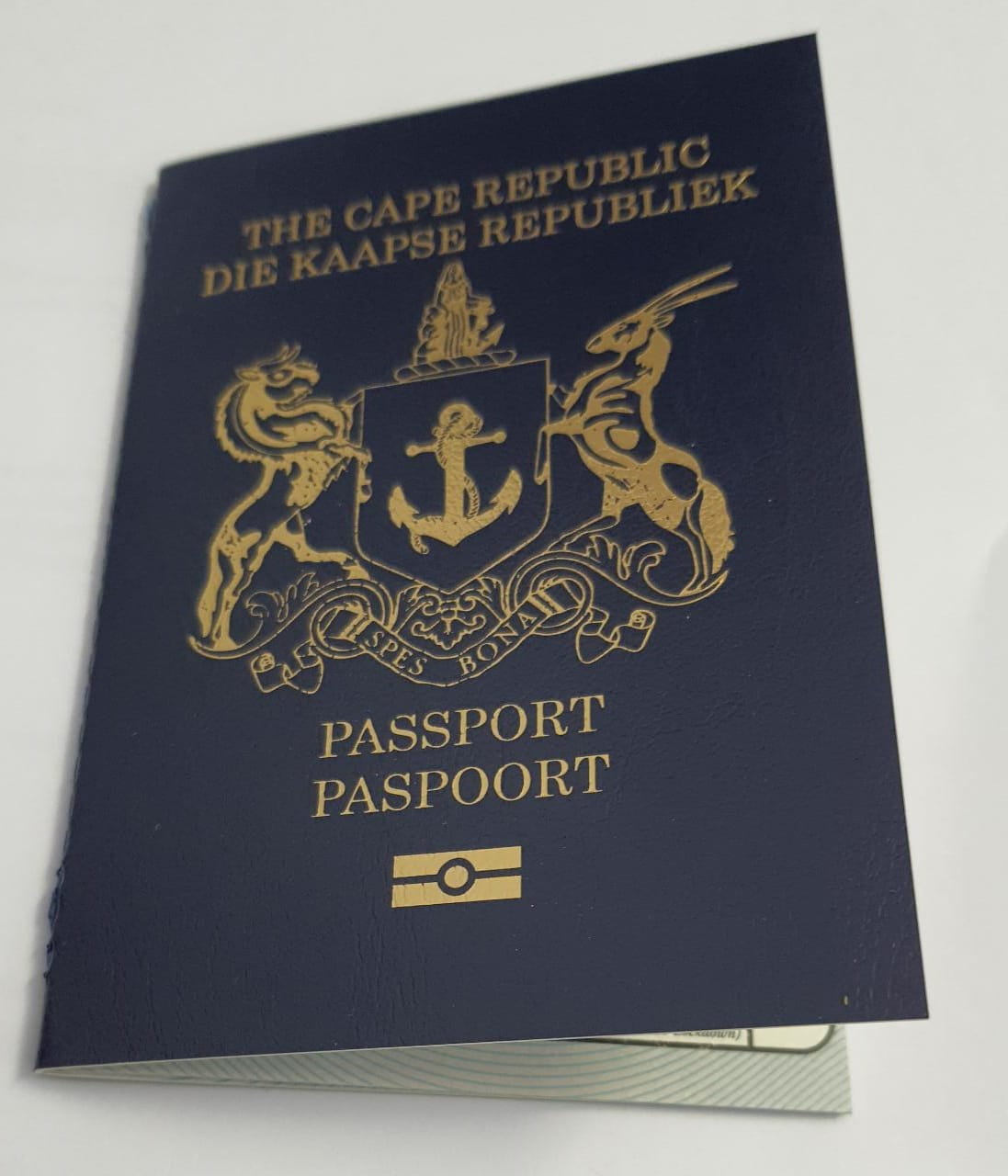
Cape Republic Novelty Passport

The Cape Party has so far contested elections in 2009, 2011, 2016, 2019 and 2021. The party fielded candidates in all wards of the City of Cape Town in the municipal elections of 2011, and also contested wards of the Cape Winelands, Overberg, Garden Route and West Coast municipalities. The party launched its manifesto for the election on 15 April 2011. Miller described the election as "an opportunity to take great steps toward our end goal of establishing the Cape Republic".

In addressing the results of the 2009 elections, a party spokesperson described the Cape Party's campaign in those elections as a publicity drive, noting that it didn't expect to win any seats. He said, however, that the party hoped to win a "significant portion" of votes in 2011, adding that the party's support was growing and was strongest in people between the ages of 18 and 35. He acknowledged, however, that this was difficult for the media to believe. The party finally garnered 1,670 votes (0.1% of the Western Cape vote) on the proportional representation ballot in the 2011 election.

In 2011, the Cape Party was the first political party to put up election posters in the City of Cape Town. However, the party claimed that 2500 of these went missing in three weeks. A party spokesman blamed the Democratic Alliance for the missing posters, calling them "masters of the dark arts", and alleging that the Cape Party posters had been replaced with posters for the DA.

In the runup to the 2021 South African municipal elections, the party released a Cape Republic Novelty Passport. The party gained two seats in the City of Cape Town.

=== Provincial elections ===
Election	Western Cape			
Election	Valid Votes	Seats	%	
2009	2,552	0	0.13	0/42
2019	9,331	0	0.45	0/42

=== Municipal elections ===
Election	Valid Votes	%
2016	4,473	0.01%
2021	17,881	0.06%

=== Growth in by-elections ===
During November 2017, the party took part in by-elections for the Brackenfell Ward, wherein it received 18.72% of the vote; taking second place, after the Democratic Alliance.

During December 2018, the party took part in by-elections for the Saldanha Ward, wherein it again took second place, after the Democratic Alliance, ahead of the ANC.

During February 2019, the party again took second place, after the Democratic Alliance, ahead of the ANC, in the Sea Point by-elections.

== See also ==
- Cape Colony
- Cape independence
- Cape Province
- Politics of the Western Cape
- Self-determination
- Referendum Party (South Africa) (2023–2026)
