= Dean Hutton =

South African Artist

- Born: May 3, 1976 (age 50); Johannesburg, South Africa
- Other name: Goldendean
- Education: University of South Africa, Rhodes University, University of Cape Town
- Occupations: Visual artist, performer, educator, curator
- Known for: Transmedia art, community arts projects, queer and decolonial practice; public performance interventions
- Notable work: Fuck White People exhibition (court ruling on art/hate speech), Floating Bodies project, Imminent and Eminent Ecologies exhibition
- Awards: British Council Unlimited awards (micro & international partner programs), University of Johannesburg Artist-in-Residence
- Website: goldendean.com

Dean Hutton (born 3 May 1976), also known as Goldendean, is a visual artist, performer, and activist from South Africa. Their work explores themes of identity, body politics, social justice, and ecology through transmedia art, photography, video, performance, and sculpture. Hutton's practice engages deeply with queer and postcolonial narratives, focusing on repair, visibility, and the reimagining of public space.

== Early life and education ==
Hutton was born in Johannesburg, South Africa, on 3 May 1976. Coming from a struggling family, They fell in love with photography at a young age and started experimenting with an old camera. They obtained a Bachelor of Arts from the University of South Africa (UNISA) and a Higher Diploma in Journalism with distinction from Rhodes University. In 2018, Hutton completed a Master of Fine Arts (Cum Laude) at the University of Cape Town, where their research focused on radical queer narratives and the politics of representation. Hutton worked from 1997 to 2006 for the Mail & Guardian as a Photo Editor before moving to the Chief Photographer position.

== Artistic practice ==
Hutton's transmedia practice combines performance, photography, sculpture, printmaking, and community engagement. Through their alter ego Goldendean, Hutton challenges normative understandings of gender, race, and privilege. Their work uses what they describe as "simple disruptive actions" to provoke dialogue about inclusion, courage, and care in public spaces.

Their art often addresses queer visibility, body politics, anti-colonial resistance, and ecological healing. Hutton's installations and performances aim to create "moments of soft courage," encouraging empathy and collective transformation.

== Notable works and exhibitions ==
One of Hutton's most well-known works is the performance and installation piece Fuck White People, which was exhibited at the Iziko South African National Gallery in Cape Town in 2017. The work was vandalized at the gallery by members of the Cape Independence Party. It also became the subject of a legal challenge under South Africa's Equality Act; however, the Western Cape Equality Court ruled that the work constituted protected artistic expression and did not amount to hate speech.

Hutton has participated in numerous solo and group exhibitions, including:

- Imminent and Eminent Ecologies, FADA Gallery, University of Johannesburg (2024)
- Floating Bodies (Bioart & Design Africa programme, 2023–2024)
- Amsterdam Light Festival (2019)
- Group exhibitions in South Africa and internationally exploring intersections of identity, environment, and social justice.

== Academic and professional work ==
Hutton has lectured and facilitated at several South African art institutions, including the University of the Witwatersrand, Market Photo Workshop, and University of Johannesburg. Their academic and community projects promote socially engaged art practices, mentorship, and the empowerment of marginalized voices in visual culture.

== Themes and influence ==
Across their body of work, Hutton interrogates the intersections of queer identity, race, colonial history, and environmental care. They advocate for art as a tool of nation-building, social cohesion, and heritage preservation, positioning creative practice as central to South Africa's ongoing journey toward equality and healing.

Their artistic interventions and public performances have sparked important national conversations around freedom of expression, representation, and the role of art in social transformation.

== Personal life ==
Hutton is genderqueer and uses they/them pronouns. They live and work in Johannesburg.

== Awards ==
- 2023 British Council Unlimited International Partner Awards.
- 2023 University of Johannesburg Artist in Residence Program.
- 2022 British Council Unlimited Micro Awards.

=== Publications ===
- PLAN B, A Gathering of Strangers (or) This Is Not Working, 2018.
