= Cape independence =

Secessionist movement in South Africa

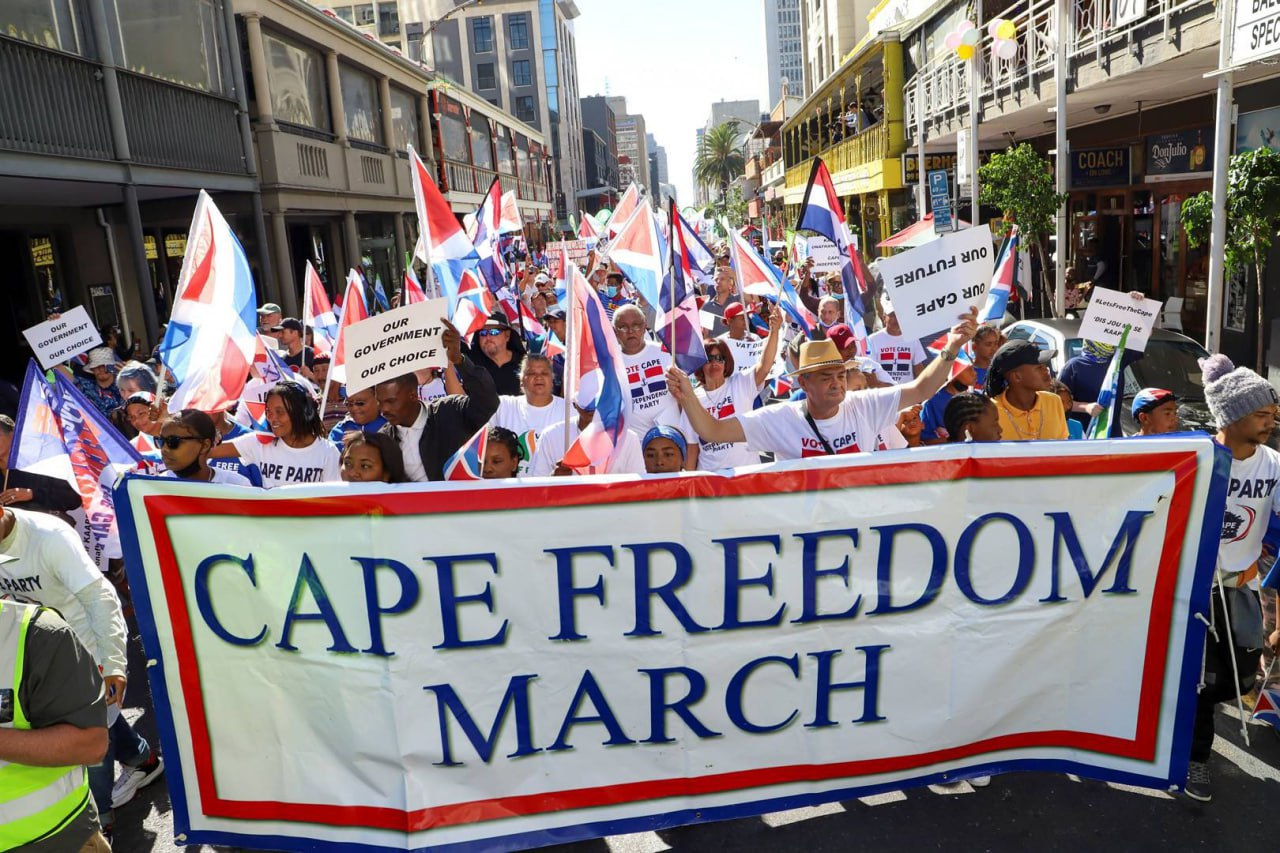
March for Cape Independence

Cape independence (Afrikaans: Kaapse onafhanklikheid; isiXhosa: inkululeko yaseKapa), also known by the portmanteau CapeXit, is a secessionist self-determination political movement that seeks the independence of the Western Cape province (alongside Afrikaans-speaking portions of the Eastern and Northern Cape provinces in some proposals) from South Africa.

== Context ==
=== Demographic context ===
==== Language ====
Borders of the Western Cape in dark red.

The Western Cape province is the most racially diverse province in South Africa, being the single province with no majority racial group. Just under half of Western Cape inhabitants speak Afrikaans as a first language, with sizeable minorities speaking isiXhosa and English as their first languages.

==== Ethnic Groups ====
A plurality of the Cape's people are 'Cape Coloured', a diverse ethnicity with varying ancestry of indigenous Khoisan, other African, European and Asian people. Historically they have been the majority ethnic group in the Cape.

Other notable minority ethnic groups include the Cape Dutch (Afrikaners), Anglos and Xhosa people people who are descendants of European and Bantu settlers to Southern Africa respectively.

Polling suggests that Cape Coloureds are the biggest supporters of independence, followed by Cape Dutch (Afrikaners) and then Anglos. Xhosa people - a demographic that has grown from 19.1% in 1996 to 31.4% by 2022 - tend to be opposed to independence.

=== Political context ===
Mainstream political figures including John Steenhuisen, the former leader of the Democratic Alliance (DA), have indicated support for devolution proposals that would give the Western Cape more autonomy. Critics of devolution proposals, including African National Congress (ANC) leaders, argue that they amount to covert support for Cape independence. However, the DA have publicly stated that they do not support outright secession and only greater autonomy via devolution.

== History ==
=== Formation of the Union of South Africa ===
In the late 19th century there were four colonies and independent states in what is now South Africa – the British Cape Colony, Natal and the two Boer Republics – Orange Free State and South African Republic. There were numerous attempts to unify these separate entities due to fears of external (non-British) European powers potentially interfering. Numerous proposals were put forward from a highly centralised unitary state to a more loose decentralised federation as proposed by powerful Cape politician Saul Solomon. Ultimately these endeavours failed, and war broke out between the British Empire and the Boer Republics following the discovery of gold in the South African Republic.

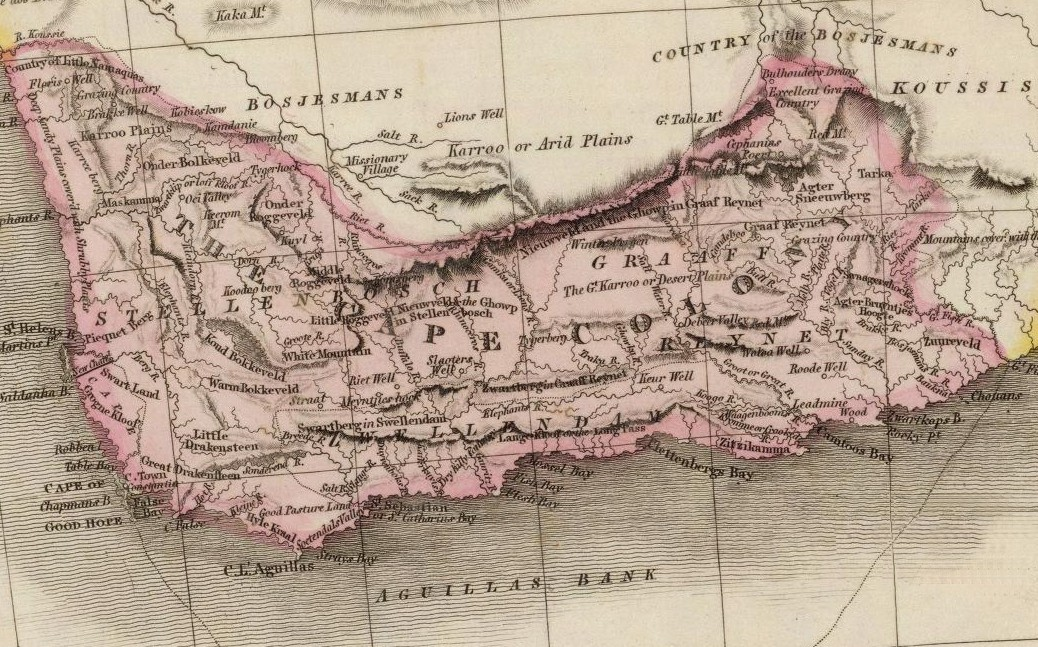
Map of the Cape Colony in 1809

Following the British victory in the war, the South Africa Act 1909 was passed by the British parliament and the newly conquered republics alongside the Cape Colony and Natal were unified into one centralised, unitary state – the Union of South Africa. This was unlike the formation of Canada and Australia which were created as federations.

==== Degradation of non-racialism in the Cape ====
The former Cape Colony was unique in that the franchise to vote was not determined by skin colour, but on residential, economical and educational requirements, in stark contrast to the other states in the region. During the negotiations for the creation of the Union, the Cape's last Prime Minister, John X. Merriman, fought unsuccessfully to have this multi-racial franchise system extended to the rest of South Africa. The attempt failed in the face of opposition from the white governments of the other constituent states, which were determined to entrench white rule.

The final version of the South Africa Act permitted the Cape Province to keep a newly restricted version of its traditional franchise, where qualification for suffrage was limited to education and wealth. This led to the Cape being the only province in South Africa where coloureds and black Africans could vote. However, the act also permitted the Parliament of South Africa to prescribe all other voting qualifications and it could override the Cape's franchise with a two-thirds majority.

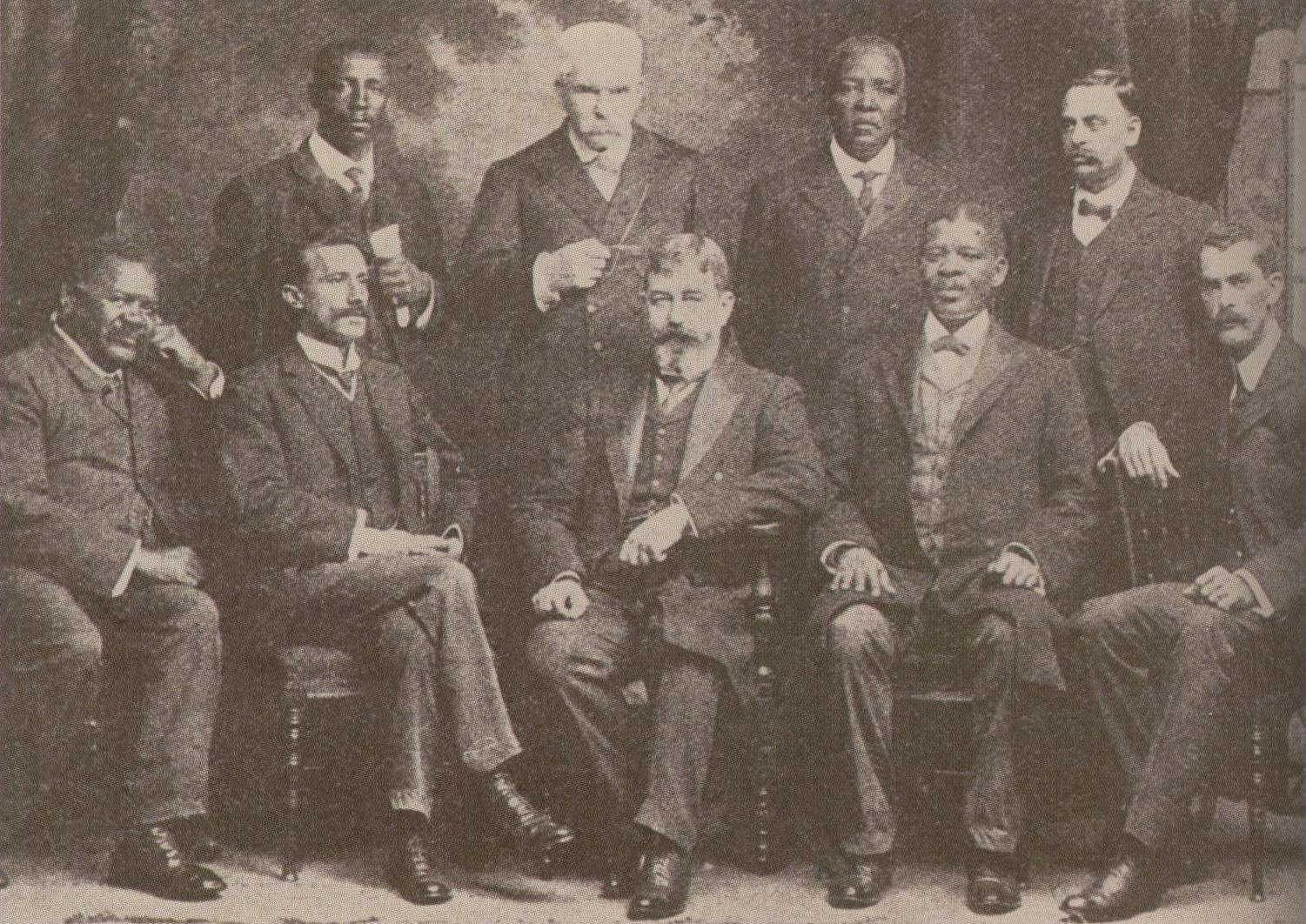
The multi-racial Cape opposition delegation which lobbied the London Convention on Union for the non-racial franchise. Present are prominent Cape politicians such as Abdurahman, John Tengo Jabavu, Walter Rubusana and William Schreiner.

Initially, the right to this franchise was upheld, but with the substantial support for segregation based policies from the incorporated northern regions, these rights were gradually reduced via acts of parliament. This had a significant effect on the support for more liberal politics, such as the United Party, which drew large support from coloured people in the Cape. As a result, in 1948 the National Party won the national elections while campaigning on the platform of apartheid, being enable to draw on conservative white voters in the more densely populated north.

=== Apartheid years ===
In the subsequent apartheid years, the people of the Cape Province continued with their liberal traditions. In 1951, whilst in opposition to the National Party led government's move to finally strike all coloureds off the voters roll, the torch commando led many large scale protests in the Cape against those policies, with torch lit marches in Cape Town that drew up to 75,000 protesters. Within parliament, opposition towards apartheid was led under the leadership of the Progressive Party, where the majority of their support was drawn from the Cape Province.

As negotiations to end apartheid began, renewed calls to form a decentralised federal state came from the Democratic Party (successor to the Progressive Party) and the Freedom Front amongst others. In the end via CODESA accords, the National Party (NP) and African National Congress (ANC) agreed upon a partially-devolved unitary state instead.

=== Post-apartheid ===
With the fall of Apartheid and the implementation of a new constitution, the Cape Province and other provinces were divided into new provinces: The Western Cape, Eastern Cape, Northern Cape and a portion of the North West. During the 1994 election, the Western Cape was one of the only provinces who didn't vote for the ANC, instead opting to vote for the now reformed and non-racial New National Party. Throughout the following years, the ANC never managed to attain an outright majority in the Western Cape, only forming a provincial government once from 2004 to 2009 during a period of strong economic growth. As economic growth stagnated alongside a rise in political scandals, such as the Arms Deal & HIV denialism, the Western Cape voted for the Democratic Alliance in 2009 who have been in office ever since.

==== Growth ====
The most widely used flag of the Cape Independence movement.

The modern Cape independence movement started in 2007 when the Cape Party was founded off a Facebook group based on the growing disillusionment with the national government's continued use of race-based policies and declining economic growth. The movement gained little traction until the latter half of the 2010s when, after years of persistent government corruption, the inability of the DA to significantly grow outside of the Cape, slowed economic growth, and increasing nationalist rhetoric within and outside of the Cape, other organisations such as CapeXit, Gatvol Capetonian, and the Sovereign State of Good Hope were formed.

With the onset of the COVID-19 pandemic and further disillusionment with the national government failing to reform despite a new leader, the movement began to gain momentum. That same year the Cape Independence Advocacy Group (a political pressure group) was formed followed by polling on the issue to be conducted. Later that year the Freedom Front Plus came out in support of Cape independence.

With the persistence of the pandemic alongside large scale social unrest, where over 300 people died in the east and the north of the country in 2021, the movement continued to grow on this trajectory.

In 2023 two bills were tabled in the Western Cape Provincial Legislature that sought to give the province more political power. The Western Cape People's Bill (WCPB), tabled by the FF+, was a bill that aimed to recognise 'Western Capetonians' as a distinct people from the rest of South Africa, while the Western Cape Provincial Powers Bill (WCPPB) aimed to compel the Western Cape government to investigate and use all legal means to devolve as much power down to the province as possible.

==== Referendum Ultimatum ====
In October 2023 the Cape Referendum Alliance, a group of pro-independence organisations sent an ultimatum to Premier Alan Winde for him to call a referendum on independence or for him to ask the President of South Africa to call one. The Premier refused.

In response, the CIAG launched the Referendum Party (RP), a single-issue political party that sought to keep a DA-led Western Cape government but force the issue of a referendum as its coalition condition.

==== CIAG American advocacy trip ====
In March 2025, the Referendum Party became embroiled in controversy when the CIAG, led by party head Phil Craig, attempted to gain support from the second Trump administration. The move drew criticism, including from the state president Cyril Ramaphosa. The government also revealed that Mr Craig does not hold South African citizenship, merely permanent residency.

Following this, there were calls for his deportation, including from political parties ActionSA, African Transformation Movement and the Economic Freedom Fighters. The minister of Home Affairs responded that Craig could not be deported based on his political stances, and stated that he had not applied of citizenship yet. Craig countered that he has applied for citizenship, having lived in the country for twenty years, and accused the government of being incompetently slow in processing this.

On 25 March 2026 the Referendum Party merged into the Freedom Front Plus.

== Legal position ==
=== Calling of a referendum ===
Section 127 of the South African Constitution gives provisions for the Premiers to call for referendums in their own province. However, there is some debate about whether this is possible as the Referendum Act predates the current constitution and does not explicitly allow for Premiers to call referendums. Some argue that new referendum legislation first needs to be passed, others that a premier's right to call a referendum can be 'read in'. The Democratic Alliance has introduced a bill in 2021 to align the law with the constitution. In addition, section 37(f) of the constitution of the Western Cape also gives provisions for Premiers to call for referendums. Proponents of secession hence argue that it is a possibility to hold a referendum on Cape Independence within the Western cape.

=== Right to self-determination ===
Section 235 of the Constitution of South Africa states:

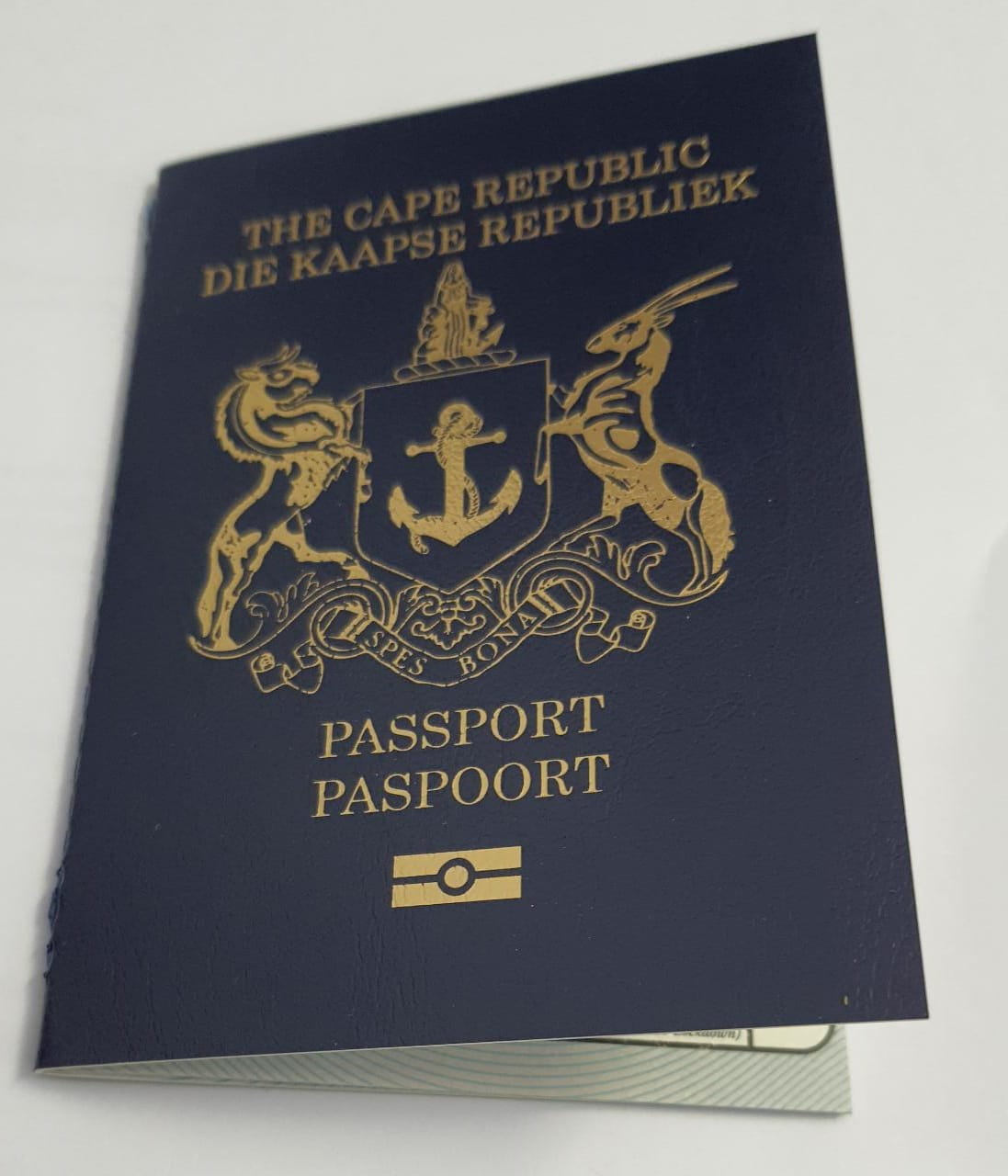
Cape Republic Novelty Passport.

The right of the South African people as a whole to self-determination, as manifested in this Constitution, does not preclude, within the framework of this right, recognition of the notion of the right of self-determination of any community sharing a common cultural and language heritage, within a territorial entity in the Republic or in any other way, determined by national legislation.

However, the qualifier of this right states that any such self-determination would occur "within a territorial entity in the Republic or in any other way, determined by national legislation". Section 235 does not explicitly grant the right to secede from South Africa. Enclaves such as Orania or the various African kingdoms within South Africa, while maintaining this right to self-determination, remain bound by the South African Constitution and legislation.

On the other hand, the South African Constitution makes it clear that both the Bill of Rights, and the Constitution itself, must consider International Law.

Section 39(1)(b) states:

When interpreting the Bill of Rights, a court, tribunal or forum (b) must consider international law;

Section 233 states:

When interpreting any legislation, every court must prefer any reasonable interpretation of the legislation that is consistent with international law over any alternative interpretation that is inconsistent with international law

Since 1994, South Africa has ratified three international covenants which guarantee the right of self-determination to all peoples:

On 9 July 1996 South Africa ratified the African Charter on Human and Peoples' Rights (ACHPR) which, in Article 20, states that all peoples have the right to exist, that their right to self-determination is unquestionable and inalienable, and that they can freely pursue their economic and social development according to the policy they have freely chosen.

On 10 December 1998 South Africa ratified the International Covenant on Civil and Political Rights (ICCPR) which, in Article 1, states that all peoples have the right to self-determination, and by virtue of that right they can freely determine their political status and freely pursue their economic, social, and cultural development.

On 12 January 2015 South Africa ratified the International Covenant on Economic, Social, and Cultural Rights (ICESCR) which, in Article 1, again states that all peoples have the right to self-determination, and by virtue of that right they can freely determine their political status and freely pursue their economic, social, and cultural development;

Thus the right to self-determination has been proposed as a route for creating a legal framework wherein the Cape could secede from South Africa.

On the other hand, some critics point out that remedial secession is seen as an 'extreme' measure, usually reserved for former colonies or when a people suffer 'extreme prejudice'. Hence they argue that self-determination is not necessarily synonymous with secession, nor does the former lead to the latter in the majority of cases. Furthermore, despite the references to international law in the South African Constitution and Bill of Rights, international law does not contain an explicit right or legal framework for secession.

Recently, this view was undermined when Dr Alfred de Zayas, the United Nations' (UN) 'Independent Expert on the promotion of a democratic and equitable international order', tabled a report to the General Assembly of the UN in 2014 which clarified that self-determination cannot be limited to de-colonisation and that secession is a legitimate expression of self-determination. De Zayas followed this up with a 2017 paper 'The law on self-determination today' and a second report to the UN General Assembly in 2018.

== Opinion polling and support ==
=== Opinion polling ===
There have been four opinion polls conducted by Victory Research, a South African-based market research company whose leadership has close ties with the Democratic Alliance (DA). Their other clientele includes: Uber, British American Tobacco, First Rand, and KPMG.

Another poll was done by Brazilian-based AtlasIntel as part of their 2024 South African general election polling. It asked respondents across South Africa whether they supported Cape Independence - inclusive of the Northern and Eastern Cape.

| Date Conducted | Polling Organisation | Sample Size | Margin of Error | In favour of holding a referendum | Against holding a referendum | In favour of Independence | Against Independence |
|---|---|---|---|---|---|---|---|
| July 2020 | Victory Research | 802 | ±4% | 46.6% | 52.3% | 35.8% | 63.3% |
| July 2021 | Victory Research | 886 | ±5% | 58% | 39.5% | 46.2% | 49.6% |
| August 2023 | Victory Research | 1080 | ±5% | 68% | 30.2% | 58.4% | 34.8% |
| May 2024 | AtlasIntel^{*} | 383^{*} | ±5% | N/A | N/A | 35.7% | 53.6% |
| March 2025 | Victory Research | 820 | ±3.5% | 50.8% | 43.9% | 42.8% | 52.8% |

^{*}Values taken for Western Cape only.
Note: Values don't add up to 100% on the account of those not expressing an opinion or uncertain.

=== Support ===
CapeXit, an NGO gathering signed mandates in support of independence has claimed to have garnered over 820,000 signatures of registered Western Cape voters. The legitimacy of this figure is disputed.

=== Western Cape Electoral results ===
Evolution of the independence vote in WC Provincial elections
| Year | Pro-independence votes | | Population | Valid votes (Note: Blank and null votes are subtracted from the number of voters) | Turnout | Pro-independence political parties | Comments |
| Year | Number | % of total valid votes | Population | Valid votes | Turnout | Pro-independence political parties | Comments |
|---|---|---|---|---|---|---|---|
| 2009 | 2,552 | 0.13% | 5,356,800 | 1,967,751 | 75.4% | Cape Party (2,552) | Cape Party formed in 2007 |
| 2014 | – | – | 6 116 300 (estimate) | 2,121,153 | 72.76% | – | No pro-independence parties competed. |
| 2019 | 9,331 | 0.45% | 6,844,272 (estimate) | 2,057,212 | 66.28% | Cape Party (9,331) | Cape Party competes again after 10-year absence |
| 2024 | 33,581 | 1.71% | 7,497,706 (estimate) | 1,958,280 | 59.48% | FF+ (28,471); RP (5,110) | FF+ announces their support for independence. Newly formed RP competes. Cape Party reformed into CIP fails to qualify |

== Arguments used by supporters ==
In clockwise order from top left, maps showing: 1. Frequently included municipalities in the Cape independence movement.; 2. Coloured people as a percentage of the population.; 3. Party with the largest share in a voting district.; 4. Percentage of the population with Afrikaans as a home language.

Proponents of Cape independence advocate for the secession of the Cape from South Africa along numerous lines:

=== Cultural ===
The Cape region is demographically distinct from the rest of the country: with the first language of most inhabitants being Afrikaans, the region being much more racially diverse (however not ethnically diverse) and with the largest racial group being Coloureds. This blend of groups and culture has given the Cape a unique cultural heritage such as the Kaapse Klopse minstrel parades or Cape Malay cuisine.

=== Economic ===
Proponents have argued that the current economic policies of South Africa are stifling growth and development, and that an independent Cape, with a more economically liberal ideology, would be better off.

=== Ideological ===
The Western Cape is the only province in the country never to have voted for the ruling ANC in a majority. It is also the only province that has a provincial government not controlled by that party. The greater Cape region traditionally draws substantial support for the DA, with the more liberal party drawing strong support from Coloureds, and more generally from people with English or Afrikaans as a first language.

=== Non-racialism ===
Some proponents of independence claim that South Africa is a highly racialised country. In an August 2023 poll conducted by the CIAG, only 31% of Black respondents agreed that "I believe that South Africa belongs to everyone who lives here regardless of their race", compared with 80% of Coloureds and 88% of Whites.

Likewise, proponents argue that race-based laws, such as Black Economic Empowerment (BEE)—which is a policy aimed at addressing the inequalities created by apartheid implemented by the national government—unfairly discriminate against most inhabitants of the Western Cape. Coloured leaders such as Fadiel Adams state that under the current BEE laws, coloured people are unfairly discriminated against. As national demographic quotas (nine percent) are imposed upon a region where coloureds make up the majority.

Proponents hence campaign on making an independent Cape non-racial where race-based laws (and even racial categories) are outlawed. Opponents have argued that Cape Independence is merely a white supremacist movement which aims to provide the Western Cape to white westerners.

=== Stability ===
Proponents of Cape independence have cited the riots in the east and the north of the country in July 2021 as evidence of social instability in South Africa. The DA has argued that their home province is better governed than the rest of the country. This is highly contested. Cape Town-the capital city of the Western cape- has one of the highest murder rates of any city in South Africa. The area of Cape Town known as the Cape Flats has one of the highest murder rates in the world. It has been argued that the government of the Western Cape only supports the rich, while neglecting poorer South Africans. Supporters of Cape independence hence argue that an independent Cape would be better run, and be able to provide more stability to its people. However, given that the Western Cape houses some of the regions with the worst murder rates in South Africa, it is uncertain if this perception of stability is true.

== Criticism ==
=== Accusations of racism ===
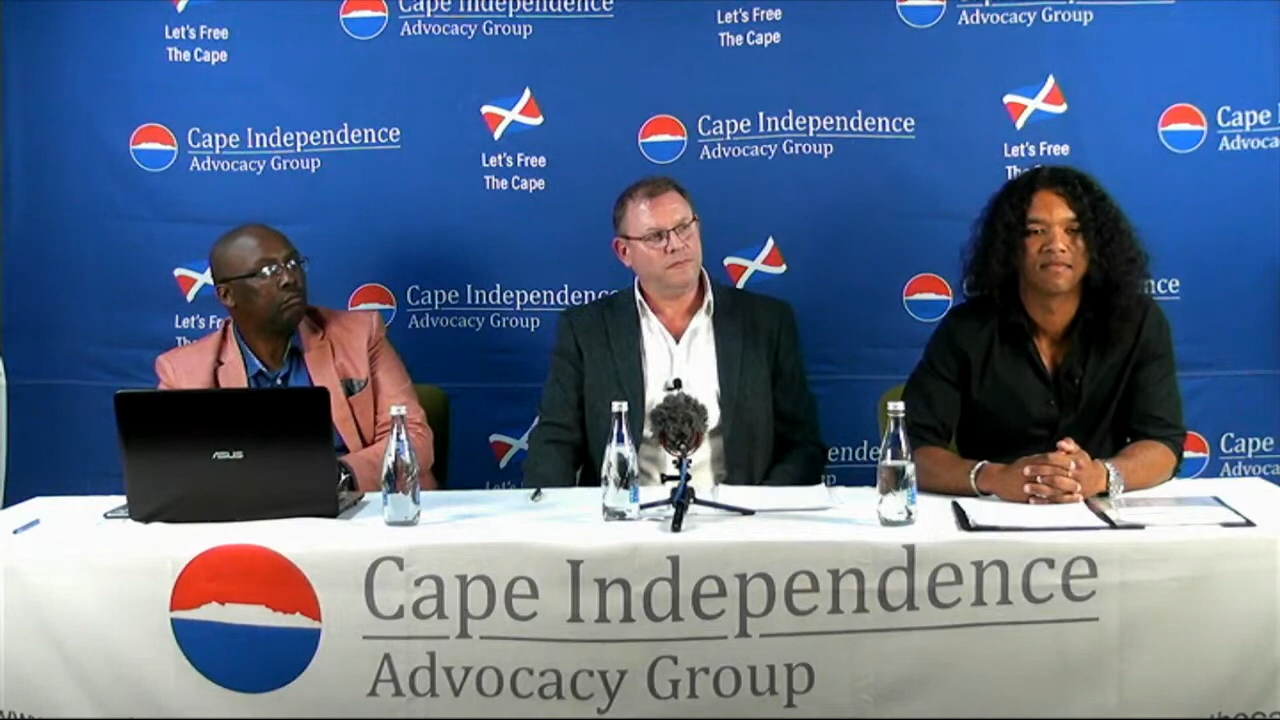
Committee members of the Cape Independence Advisory Group.

The Cape independence movement has been met with criticism involving racism. Some critics allege that the movement is an attempt to create a White ethno-state and seeking to reimplement the former apartheid system. Polling conducted by Victory Research on behalf of the Cape Independence Advocacy Group (CIAG) in Q3 2023 found that 62% of white people, 78% of coloured people, and 31% of black people supported Cape independence.

In April 2022, the CIAG was accused of racism for a pictograph which depicted the rest of South Africa as black and the Western Cape as shades of brown, black, and white. This was displayed alongside two other images with the imagery of the USSR and ANC over South Africa, with only the Western Cape showing the Ukrainian and Democratic Alliance colours under the heading "We're Just Different".

It has been argued that the Western Cape has a greater racism problem than the rest of the country. Between 2022 and 2023 the South African Human Rights commission, received more racism complaints in that province than any other one. Furthermore, the DA, the governing party of the Western Cape, is routinely criticised as being racist.

=== Legality arguments ===
Critics argue that a constitutional amendment would be required, as Section 235 of the South African Constitution, while formally and officially establishing "the right of self-determination of any community sharing a common cultural and language heritage", does not place a legal obligation for the National Assembly to respect this right to self determination; and hence, that a referendum would be non-binding; nor does it provide a framework for a territory of the Republic to secede. Furthermore, critics argue that advocating is tantamount to sedition – however, former National Prosecuting Authority spokesperson Mthunzi Mhlaga has stated that secession is a political matter & Minister in the Presidency, Khumbudzo Ntshavheni publicly affirmed that the actions of the Cape Independence Advocacy Group (CIAG) were constitutionally protected.

=== Potential for violence ===
It is claimed by other opponents of the Cape independence movement that even if a successful referendum were to be held, violence could break out potentially leading to civil war.

=== Failure to Disclose Financing ===
In June 2024, the Referendum Party, received an in-kind donation from the Cape Independence Advocacy Group (CIAG) worth R937 341, comprising campaign resources such as office space, 200 T-shirts, 20 000 flyers, 2 000 posters, gazebos and social media advertising. This contribution, reported late to the Electoral Commission of South Africa (IEC), led to a directive under Section 15 of the Electoral Act requiring the party to explain its delayed declaration and exposing it to potential administrative fines.

== Involved organisations ==
Below a table is presented with some of the organisations involved in the Cape independence movement.

| Organisation Name | Type | Goal | Regions Included |
|---|---|---|---|
| Cape Independence Advocacy Group | Lobby Group | Pressure the Western Cape government to hold a referendum | Western Cape |
| CapeXit | NPO | Secure enough mandates to pressure for the holding of a referendum | Western Cape |
| Cape Independence Party | Political Party | Coalition in Western Cape government and demand a referendum | Western Cape, majority and plurality Afrikaans speaking regions of the Eastern, Northern Cape and Free State. |
| Cape Youth Front | Youth Org | Rally support for independence amongst the Youth | Western Cape, majority and plurality Cape Coloured regions of the Eastern and Northern Cape. |
| Freedom Front Plus | Political Party | Coalition in Western Cape government and demand a referendum | Western Cape |
| The Cape Independent | Online Newspaper | News related to the Cape, with a focus on autonomy issues | Historical Cape region (1854) |

== See also ==
- Cape Colony
- Cape Qualified Franchise
- Secession
- Self-determination
