= 2004 Western Cape provincial election =

The 2004 Western Cape provincial election was held on 14 April 2004, concurrently with the 2004 South African general election, to elect the 3rd Western Cape Provincial Parliament. As of 2024, this election was the first and only time in which the African National Congress led the provincial government, as well as the most recent time that the ANC was the largest party in the Provincial Parliament.

== Background ==
The previous election resulted in no party obtaining a majority in the Provincial Parliament. The NNP formed a coalition with the smaller Democratic Party, with Morkel remaining as premier. In 2000, plans began to prepare an amalgamation of the two parties under the name Democratic Alliance. However, in 2001, the NNP leadership pulled out of its co-operation with the DA and instead sought to form a partnership with the African National Congress. Morkel was deeply critical of this decision and attempted to turn the majority of the NNP against it. When this failed, he was forced to resign as premier. He was succeeded by Peter Marais as leader of the NNP and was elected Premier of the Western Cape on 5 December 2001.

Marais served until his resignation on 3 June 2002 amid allegations of sexual harassment. Marais was then succeeded by Marthinus van Schalkwyk as leader of the NNP and premier. During the 2003 floor-crossing period four members of the provincial parliament crossed to the ANC, giving it an absolute majority of 22 seats in the 42-seat house. However, the ANC remained in coalition with the NNP and van Schalkwyk remained as Premier heading into the 2009 provincial election.

== Results ==
Party	Votes	%	Seats	+/–
African National Congress	709,052	45.25	19	+1
Democratic Alliance	424,832	27.11	12	+7
New National Party	170,469	10.88	5	−12
Independent Democrats	122,867	7.84	3	New
African Christian Democratic Party	53,934	3.44	2	+1
United Democratic Movement	27,489	1.75	1	0
Africa Muslim Party	11,019	0.70	0	New
New Labour Party	10,526	0.67	0	New
Freedom Front Plus	9,705	0.62	0	0
Pan Africanist Congress	6,524	0.42	0	0
United Christian Democratic Party	3,575	0.23	0	New
Green Party of South Africa	3,317	0.21	0	New
Peace and Justice Congress	3,278	0.21	0	New
National Action	2,248	0.14	0	New
Inkatha Freedom Party	2,222	0.14	0	0
Cape People's Congress	1,960	0.13	0	New
Azanian People's Organisation	1,455	0.09	0	New
Moderate Independent Party	953	0.06	0	New
Peace and Development Party	789	0.05	0	New
Universal Party	735	0.05	0	New
Total	1,566,949	100.00	42	0
Valid votes	1,566,949	99.02		
Invalid/blank votes	15,554	0.98		
Total votes	1,582,503	100.00		
Registered voters/turnout	2,220,283	71.27		
Source: Election Resources

== Aftermath ==
The election resulted in a significant decline of the NNP to the third-largest party in the Provincial Parliament, with the ANC increasing its plurality of seats and the Democratic Alliance becoming the second-largest party. The ANC-NNP coalition continued in power, but a month after the election, premier Marthinus van Schalkwyk took up a ministerial post in the national cabinet. The ANC then selected MEC for Finance and Economic Ebrahim Rasool as the 5th premier of the province.

The NNP was finally dissolved after the 2005 floor-crossing period and its members joined the ANC, again giving that party an absolute majority of 24 seats. In the 2007 floor-crossing period the ANC gained a further three members of the provincial parliament.

On 14 July 2008, Rasool was recalled from the position of premier by the National Executive Committee of the ANC, as the ANC leadership had disapproved of him giving preference to the large Muslim and Cape Coloured populations in the Western Cape. The MEC for Economic Development and Tourism Lynne Brown was designated as his successor. Brown and the ANC were defeated by the DA in the 2009 provincial election, and Brown was succeeded by DA leader Helen Zille as premier.
