= Referendum Party (South Africa) =

Former secessionist political party in South Africa

- Abbreviation: RP
- Leader: Phil Craig
- Founded: 9 November 2023; 3 years ago
- Dissolved: 25 March 2026
- Preceded by: Cape Independence Advocacy Group (CIAG)
- Merged into: Freedom Front
- Ideology: Cape independence Self-determination
- Provincial Affiliation: CapeXit Election Accord (2024)
- Colours: Navy and Gold
- Slogan: Our Cape. Our Future. Our Choice!

Website
- www.referendumparty.org

The Referendum Party (RP) was a small secessionist political party in South Africa established to compete in the 2024 general election. The party was founded by members of the Cape Independence Advocacy Group (CIAG) in November 2023 in response to Western Cape premier Alan Winde refusing to call a referendum on Cape independence in October 2023.

The Referendum Party did not seek to remove the Democratic Alliance (DA) from the Western Cape government, but to push the DA into adopting more radical policy positions, including calling a referendum on independence and ban the use of racial laws and categories. The party was led by Phil Craig, who was previously involved in the founding of the Cape Independence Advocacy Group.

RP merged into the Freedom Front Plus on March 25 2026 after failing to secure any seats in the 2024 general elections.

== History ==
=== Formation ===
The Referendum Party had its roots in the Cape Independence Advocacy Group (CIAG), a political lobby group set up to lobby the DA-led Western Cape government to hold a referendum on independence. After years of negotiations the CIAG together with other organisations which included the Freedom Front Plus, CapeXit, the Swartland Aksie Groep and others sent an ultimatum to Alan Winde with the backing of 30k signatures. It asked the premier to either call a referendum on independence or ask the president of South Africa to call one. The Premier refused.

As a result, the CIAG launched the Referendum Party, to provide a safe haven for DA voters who also want a referendum on independence. The party was launched as a single issue party solely focused on calling for a referendum on independence.

=== 2024 South African General Election ===
In 2024, the party attempted to join the DA's Multi-Party Charter (MPC) national alliance, however the party's application was rejected due to the party's singular support for Cape independence. This is despite fellow MPC member the Freedom Front Plus (FF+) also being in favour of Cape independence. The FF+, RP and CapeXit NPO separately signed a joint electoral pact binding the parties to require a referendum on independence as part of any coalition condition in the Western Cape.

The party failed to win any seats in the general election.

=== Extra parliamentary period (2024-2026) ===
The RP stopped being singular issue after its disappointing electoral results and adopted a more broadly radical political stance in general.

In late 2024, RP launched a non-racialism campaign which was aimed to raise awareness for its extra-parliamentary submitted amendment to the constitution to ban the use of racialised laws, and racial categories in general, in South Africa.

== Election results ==
=== National Assembly elections ===
Election	Party leader	Total votes	Share of vote	Seats	+/–	Government
2024	Phil Craig	3,834	0.02% (Note: From 2024, seats in the National Assembly are determined by a combination of the national ballot, and the nine regional ballots. Only the national ballot figures are shown here.)	0 / 400	New	Extra-parliamentary

=== Provincial elections ===
Election	Western Cape	
Election	%	Seats
2024	0.26%	0/42

== See also ==
- Cape Independence Party (2007–present)
- Cape independence
- Western Cape
