= List of lighthouses in South Africa =

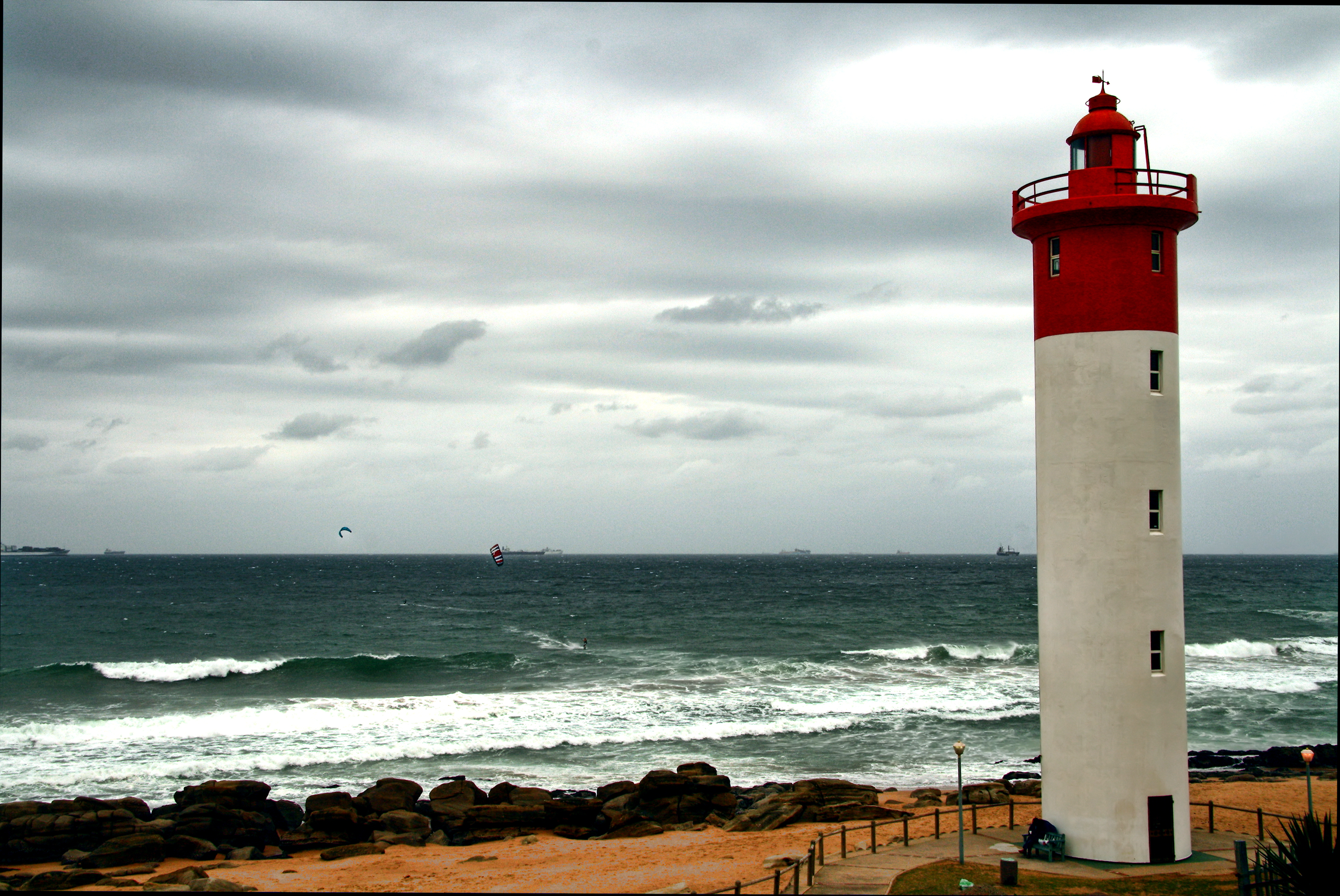
uMhlanga Rocks Lighthouse

This is a list of lighthouses in South Africa. It contains currently active lights as well as decommissioned lights of historical importance.

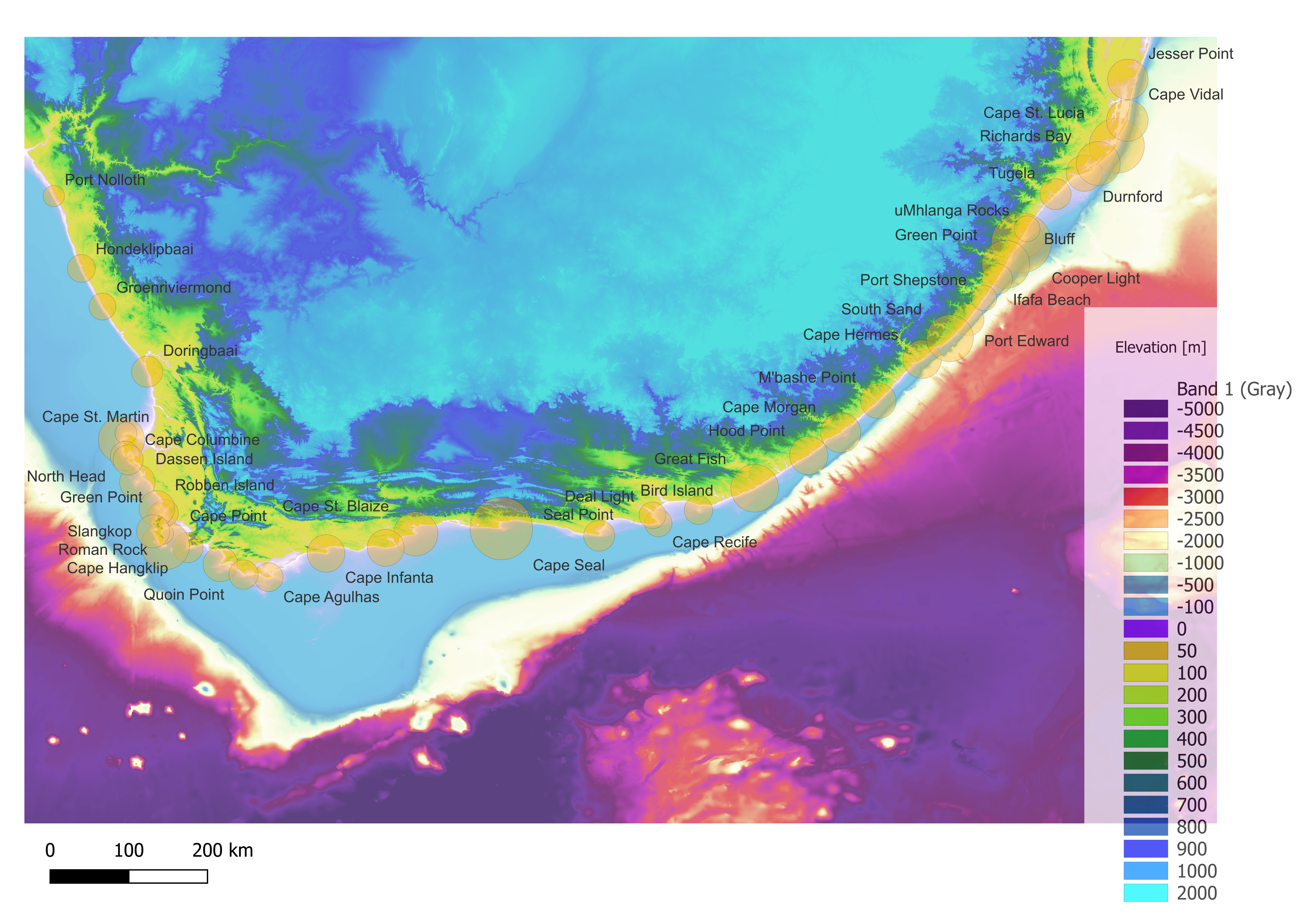
South African bathymetry and lighthouses (Pons D., 2025)

== Lighthouses ==
Lighthouse	Location	Coordinates	Year built	Structure	Focal height	ALN	Notes
Bird Island	Bird Island	33°50′29.72″S 26°17′13.55″E	1852-12-01, 1873-05-01	26 m masonry tower	30 m	D6412	The Doddington sank at the island in 1755.
Bluff	Durban, KZN	29°52′40″S 31°03′50″E	1867-01-12	concrete tower			discontinued 1940-10-16, later demolished, coordinates are for the original iron tower
Cape Agulhas	Cape Agulhas, WC	34°49′08″S 20°00′33″E	1849-03-01	27 m tower	31 m HW	D6370	National monument, Provincial Heritage Site
Cape Columbine	Paternoster, WC	32°48′39″S 17°51′23″E	1936-10-01	15 m masonry tower	80 m HW	D5810	
Cape Hangklip		34°23′11.4″S 18°49′42.3″E	1960-11-25	22 m concrete tower	34 m HW	D6280	
Cape Hermes	Port St. Johns	31°38′06″S 29°33′23″E	1903-05-01, 1904-10-16	13 m stone tower	55 m	D6442	
Cape Infanta		34°28′18.76″S 20°50′47.09″E	1979-03-15	15 m aluminium lattice tower	53 m MSL	D6371	
Cape Morgan	Morgan's Bay	32°42′26″S 28°21′55″E	1964-02-05	12 m aluminium tower	60 m	D6434	
Cape Point	Cape Point, WC	34°21′24″S 18°30′00″E	1860-05-01, 1919-03-11	9 m masonry tower	87 m HW	D6120	
Cape Recife	Algoa Bay, EC	34°01′43.97″S 25°42′03.90″E	1851-04-01	24 m masonry tower	28 m	D6390	
Cape Seal	Plettenberg Bay	34°06′27.6″S 23°24′22.83″E	1950-05-11	6 m tower	146 m	D6384	
Cape St. Blaize	Mossel Bay	34°11′09.45″S 22°09′25.14″E	1864-03-15	20.5 masonry tower	73 m	D6378	
Cape St. Lucia		28°30′54″S 32°24′00″E	1906-12-15, 1915	8 m cast iron tower	113 m	D6484	
Cape St. Martin	St Helena Bay, WC	32°42′53″S 17°55′18.53″E	1977-12-12	10 m aluminium lattice tower	18 m	D5801	
Cape Vidal	Cape Vidal Forestry Reserve, KZN	28°08′51.98″S 32°33′10.77″E	1985-07-08	23 m concrete tower	64.5 m MSL	D6485	painted yellow
Castle Point	East London, CC		1860-08-25	wood			decommissioned 1895
Cooper Light	Brighton Beach, Durban, KZN	29°56′05″S 31°00′15″E	1953-07-31	21 m concrete tower	134 m	D6458	
Danger Point		34°37′48.8″S 19°18′10.9″E	1895-01-01	masonry tower	45 m	D6320	
Dassen Island	Dassen Island, WC	33°25′54″S 18°05′22″E	1893-04-15	28 m iron tower	47 m	D5860	
Deal Light	Papenkuils river mouth	33°54′56″S 25°36′52″E	1973-11-01	22 m aluminium lattice tower	26.9 m	D6400	
Doringbaai	Doringbaai	31°49′00″S 18°14′00″E	1963-04-02	21 m aluminum lattice tower	36 m	D5734	
Durnford	Port Durnford Forestry Reserve	28°55′00″S 31°55′30″E	1916-03-01	12 m steel tower	49 m	D6482	
Great Fish	Port Alfred	33°31′10″S 27°06′34″E	1898-07-01	9 m masonry tower	85 m	D6416	
Green Point	Green Point, WC	33°54′04″S 18°24′02″E	1824-04-12	16 m masonry tower	20 m HW	D5900	National monument and Provincial Heritage site
Green Point	Umzinto, KZN	30°14′56.1″S 30°46′38.9″E	1905	21 m cast iron tower	86 m	D6454	
Groenriviermond		30°51′53″S 17°34′49″E	1988-11-21	17.2 m concrete tower	27.3 m	D5720	
The Hill	Port Elizabeth, EC		1861-06-01				decommissioned 1973-10-31
Hondeklipbaai		30°18′30.7″S 17°16′17.8″E	1936-02-15, 1956-02-15	8 m steel tower	29 m	D5704	
Hood Point	East London, EC	33°02′25.96″S 27°53′55.00″E	1895-06-04	19 m masonry tower	55 m	D6420	
Ifafa Beach		30°27′46.7″S 30°39′08.4″E	1980-02-04	23 m tower	35.1 m MSL	D6452	
Jesser Point	Sodwana Bay, KZN	27°32′41.35″S 32°33′40.81″E	1986-04	concrete tower	61 m MSL	D6486	
M'bashe Point		32°14′27.1″S 28°54′54″E	1926-12-03	14 m lattice steel tower	47 m	D6438	
Milnerton	Milnerton, WC	33°52′53.47″S 18°29′18.52″E	1960-03-10	21 m concrete tower	28 m	D5910	
Mouille Point		33°54′00″S 18°25′19″E	1842-07-01, 1865				Discontinued in 1908, demolished on or after 1921.
North Head	Saldanha Bay, WC	33°03′00″S 17°54′42″E	1939-07-12, 1969-12-02	21 m aluminum tower	33 m	D5830	
Port Edward	Port Edward, KwaZulu-Natal	31°03′24″S 30°13′33″E	1968-07-17	21 m alumunium lattice tower	38 m	D6448	
Port Nolloth	Port Nolloth, NC	29°14′58.36″S 16°52′08.48″E	1909	11 m aluminium lattice tower	17 m	D5660	
Port Shepstone	Port Shepstone, KZN	30°44′30.1″S 30°27′33.0″E	1895, ~1905	8 m cast iron tower	24 m	D6450	
Quoin Point		34°46′49.77″S 19°38′24.91″E	1955-03-02, 1990–10	21 m steel tower	32 m	D6332	
Richards Bay	Richards Bay, KZN	28°46′30.3″S 32°07′41.1″E	1979-05-22	11 m concrete tower	72 m MSL	D6483	
Robben Island	Robben Island, WC	33°48′52.20″S 18°22′29.25″E	1865-01-01	18 m masonry tower	47 m	D5870	
Roman Rock	Simon's Town, WC	34°10′54″S 18°27′42″E	1845, 1861-09-16	cast iron tower	17 m HW	D6140	
Seal Point	Cape St. Francis, EC	34°12′44.79″S 24°50′11.92″E	1878-07-04	27.75 m masonry tower	36 m	D6386	National monument, Provincial Heritage site. Construction started in 1875.
Slangkop	Kommetjie	34°08′54.59″S 18°19′11.89″E	1919-03-04	33 m iron tower	41 m HW	D6110	
South Head	Saldanha Bay, WC	33°06′19.44″S 17°57′18.01″E	1969-12-02	21 m aluminum tower	34 m	D5831	
South Sand	EC	31°19′38.10″S 29°57′41.11″E	1931-08-21	21 m steel tower	82 m	D6446	
Tugela		29°13′19.8″S 31°30′15.9″E	1972-11-22	21 m aluminium lattice tower	36 m	D6481	
uMhlanga Rocks	uMhlanga, KZN	29°43′41.57″S 31°05′18.20″E	1954-11-25	21 m concrete tower	25 m	D6480	
Ystervarkpunt		34°23′26″S 21°43′05″E	1964-08-04	21 m aluminium tower	51 m	D6374	

== See also ==
- List of lighthouses in Namibia (to the north-west)
- List of lighthouses in Mozambique (to the north-east)
- List of lighthouses and lightvessels
- Transnet National Ports Authority
- List of shipwrecks in South Africa

== Gallery ==
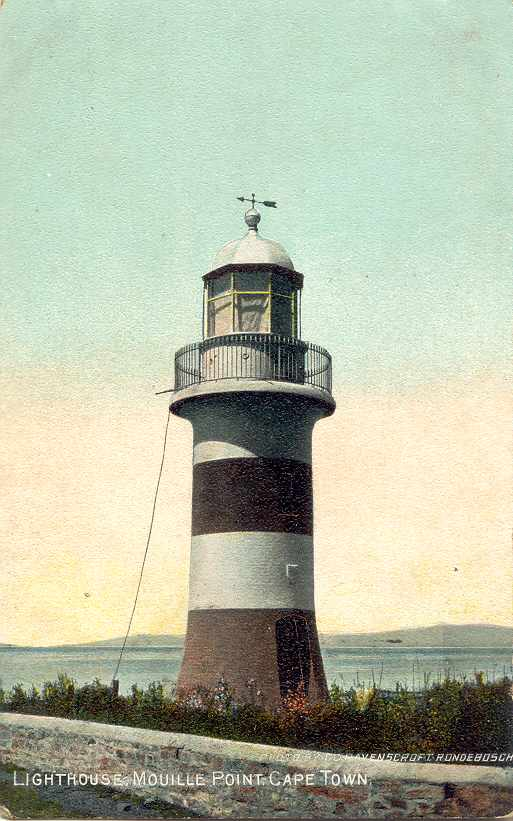
Mouille Point Lighthouse, Cape Town

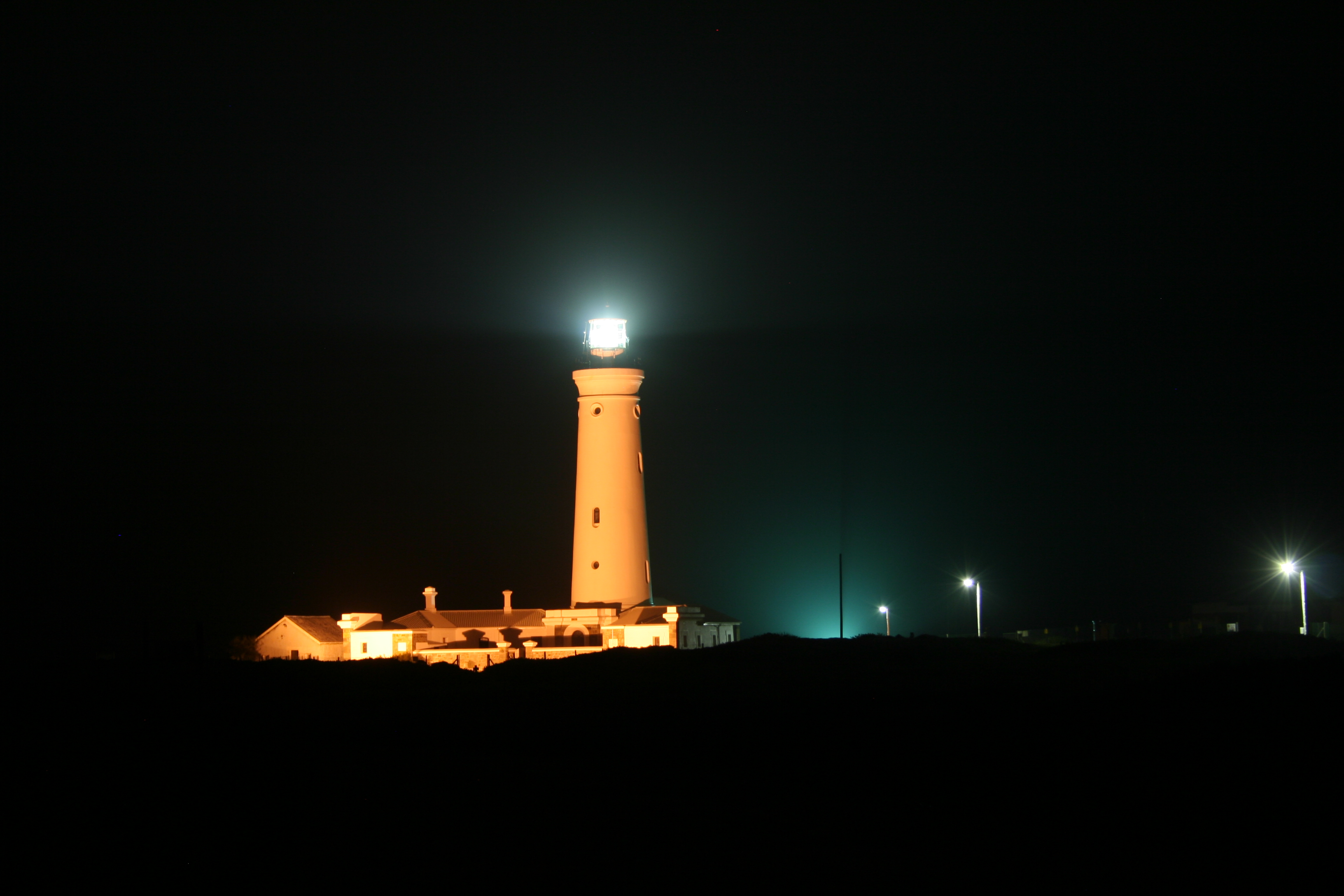
Seal Point Lighthouse

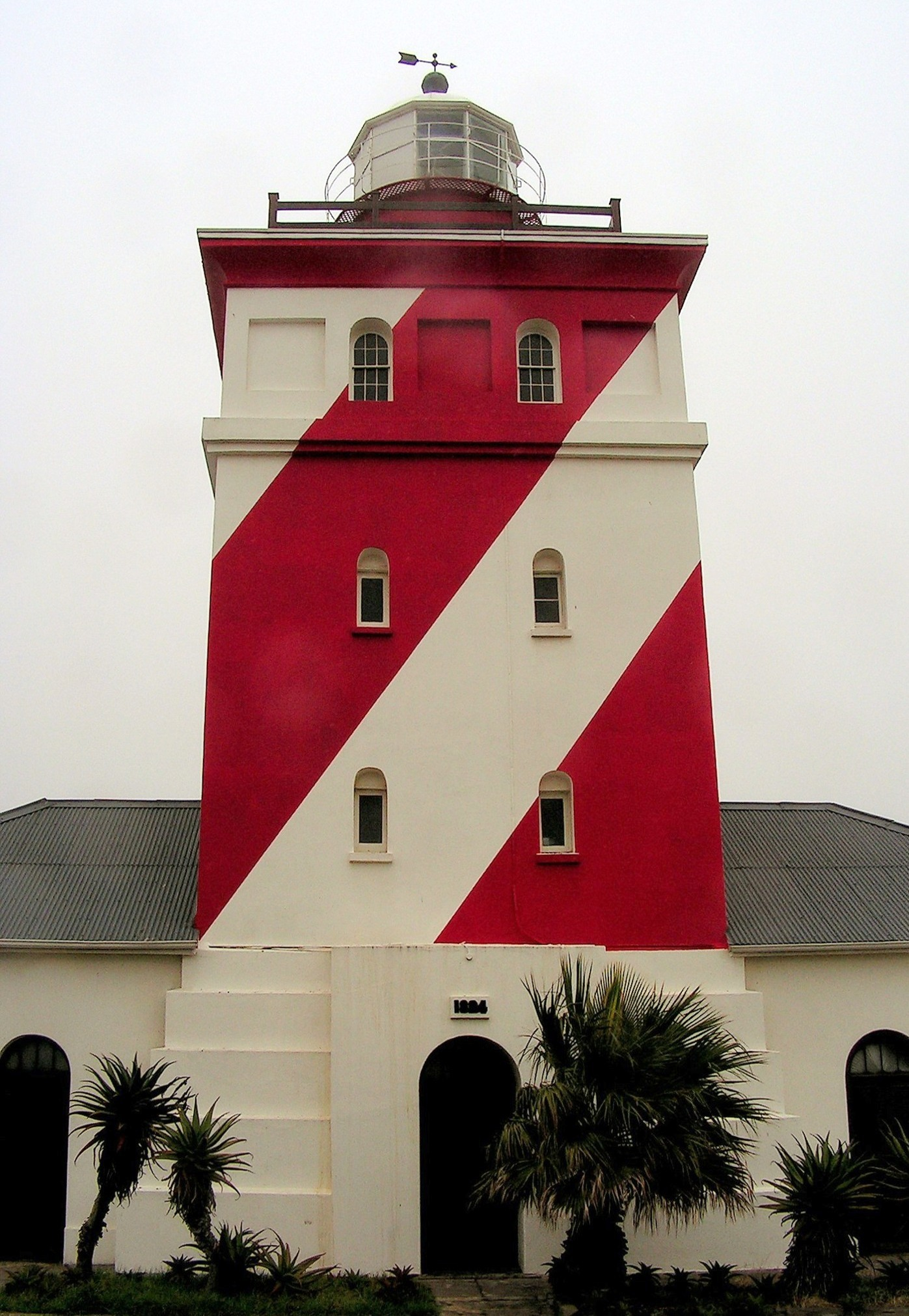
Green Point Lighthouse, Cape Town

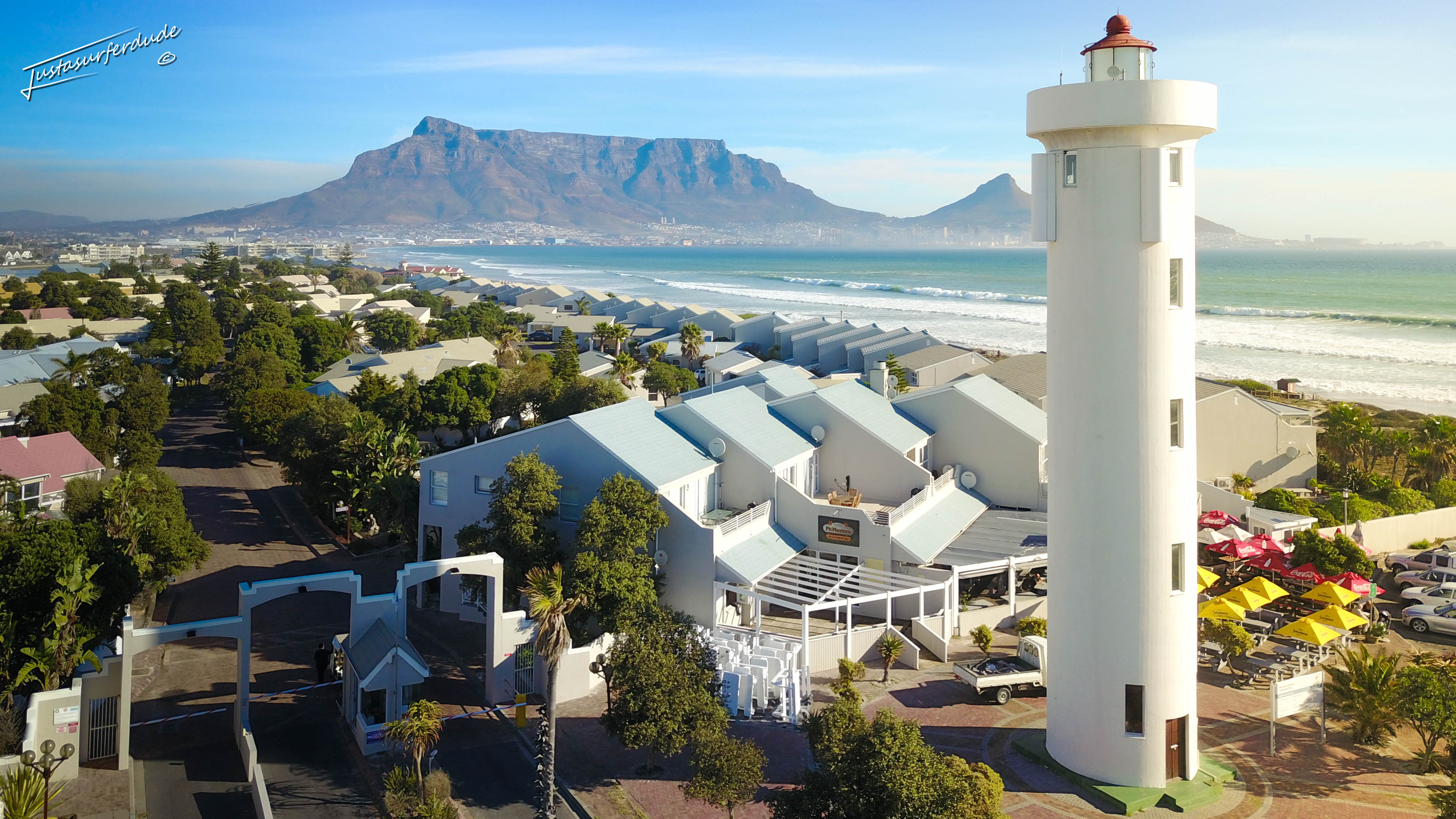
The lighthouse at Milnerton, Cape Town. It is situated on Woodbridge Island
