= Green Point Lighthouse =

Green Point Lighthouse may refer to:

- Green Point Lighthouse, Natal, South Africa
- Green Point Lighthouse, Cape Town, South Africa
- Green's Point Lighthouse, New Brunswick Canada
