= Cape Canyon Marine Protected Area =

Marine conservation area off the coast of South Africa

- Cape Canyon MPA location
- Location: Paternoster, South Africa
- Coordinates: 33°12.48′S 17°31.5′E
- Area: 580 km^{2} (220 sq mi)
- Established: 2019
- Cape Canyon Marine Protected Area (South Africa)

The Cape Canyon Marine Protected Area is an offshore marine protected area on the continental shelf edge lying approximately 10 nautical miles west of Paternoster off the Western Cape in the exclusive economic zone of South Africa.

== Purpose ==
A marine protected area is defined by the IUCN as "A clearly defined geographical space, recognised, dedicated and managed, through legal or other effective means, to achieve the long-term conservation of nature with associated ecosystem services and cultural values".

== Extent ==
Area of ocean protected is 580 km^{2} in the 180 to 500 m depth range. The protected area includes the sea bed, water column and subsoil. The MPA is about 10 nautical miles west of Paternoster.

=== Zonation ===
The Cape Canyon Marine Protected Area is zoned as a single restricted zone.

=== Boundaries ===
The boundaries of the MPA are:

- Northern boundary: S32°42.480’, E017°25’ to S32°42.480’, E017°38’
- Eastern boundary: S32°42.480’, E017°38’ to S33°0’, E017°38’
- Southern boundary: S33°0’, E017°38’ to S33°0’, E017°25’
- Western boundary: S33°0’, E017°25’ to S32°42.480’, E017°25’

== Management ==
The marine protected areas of South Africa are the responsibility of the national government, which has management agreements with a variety of MPA management authorities, which manage the MPAs with funding from the SA Government through the Department of Environmental Affairs (DEA).

The Department of Agriculture, Forestry and Fisheries is responsible for issuing permits, quotas and law enforcement.

== Climate of the South-western Cape ==
The climate of the South-western Cape is markedly different from the rest of South Africa, which is a summer rainfall region, receiving most of its rainfall during the summer months of December to February. The South-western Cape has a Mediterranean type climate, with most of its rainfall during the winter months from June to September.

During the summer the dominant factor determining the weather in the region is a high pressure zone, known as the Atlantic High, located over the South Atlantic ocean to the west of the Cape coast. Winds circulating in an anticlockwise direction from such a system reach the Cape from the south-east, producing periods of up to several days of high winds and mostly clear skies. These winds keep the region relatively cool. Because of its south facing aspect Betty's Bay is exposed to these winds.

Winter in the South-western Cape is characterised by disturbances in the circumpolar westerly winds, resulting in a series of eastward moving depressions. These bring cool cloudy weather and rain from the north west. The south westerly winds over the South Atlantic produce the prevailing south-westerly swell typical of the winter months, which beat on the exposed coastline.

== Ecology ==
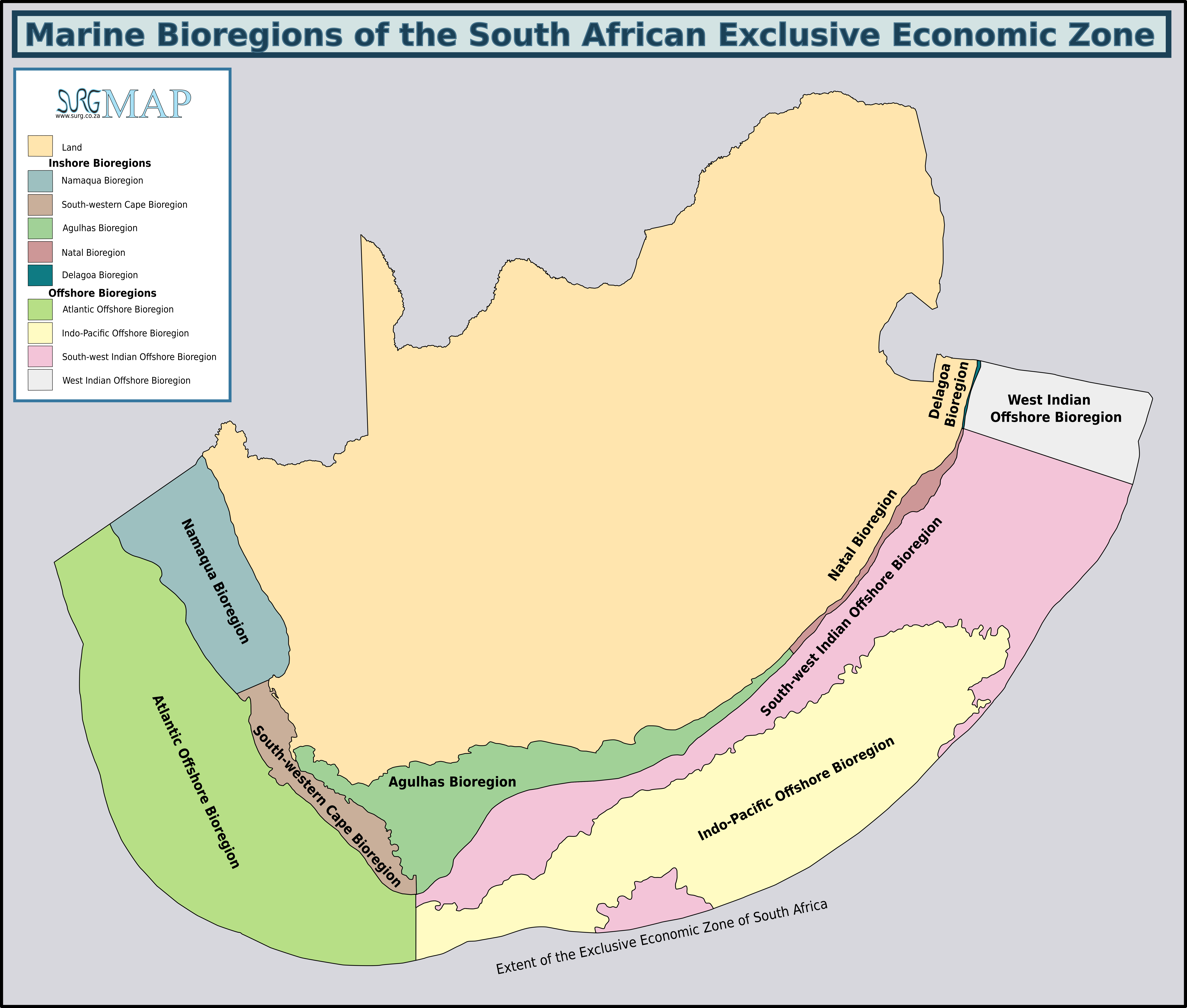
Marine bioregions of the South African Exclusive Economic Zone: Cape Canyon Marine Protected Area is in the South-western Cape bioregion.

(describe position, biodiversity and endemism of the region) The MPA is in the cool temperate South-western Cape inshore marine bioregion to the west of Cape Point which extends northwards wards to the Cape Columbine. There are a moderate proportion of species endemic to South Africa along this coastline.

(check below for applicability) Three major habitats exist in the sea in this region, distinguished by the nature of the substrate. The substrate, or base material, is important in that it provides a base to which an organism can anchor itself, which is vitally important for those organisms which need to stay in one particular kind of place. Rocky reefs provide a firm fixed substrate for the attachment of plants and animals. Sedimentary bottoms are a relatively unstable substrate and cannot anchor many of the benthic organisms. Finally there is open water, above the substrate and clear of the benthic organisms, where the organisms must drift or swim. Mixed habitats are also frequently found, which are a combination of those mentioned above.

Rocky shores and reefs There are rocky reefs and mixed rocky and sandy bottoms. For many marine organisms the substrate is another type of marine organism, and it is common for several layers to co-exist.

The type of rock of the reef is of some importance, as it influences the range of possibilities for the local topography, which in turn influences the range of habitats provided, and therefore the diversity of inhabitants. Sandstone and other sedimentary rocks erode and weather very differently, and depending on the direction of dip and strike, and steepness of the dip, may produce reefs which are relatively flat to very high profile and full of small crevices. These features may be at varying angles to the shoreline and wave fronts. There are fewer large holes, tunnels and crevices in sandstone reefs, but often many deep but low near-horizontal crevices.

Sedimentary bottoms (including silt, mud, sand, shelly, pebble and gravel bottoms) Sedimentary bottoms at first glance appear to be fairly barren areas, as they lack the stability to support many of the spectacular reef based species, and the variety of large organisms is relatively low. Sessile organisms must be specifically adapted to areas of relatively loose substrate to thrive in them, and the variety of species found on a silty, sandy or gravel bottom will depend on all these factors. Sedimentary bottoms have one important compensation for their instability, animals can burrow into the sediment and move up and down within its layers, which can provide feeding opportunities and protection from predation. Other species can dig themselves holes in which to shelter, or may feed by filtering water drawn through the tunnel, or by extending body parts adapted to this function into the water above the sand.

=== Animals ===
Mammals:

- Humpback whales.
- Cape fur seals.

Fish:

- Hake
- Monkfish
- John dory

Invertebrates:

- sea fans
- Mantis shrimps

=== Endemism ===
The MPA is in the cool temperate South-western Cape inshore marine bioregion to the north-west of Cape Point which extends northwards to Cape Columbine. There are a large proportion of species endemic to South Africa along this coastline.

== See also ==
Marine protected areas of South Africa
- List of protected areas of South Africa
- Marine protected areas of South Africa – Protected areas of coastline or ocean in the EEZ of South Africa
