= Cape Columbine =

Coordinates: 32°49′32″S 17°50′40″E

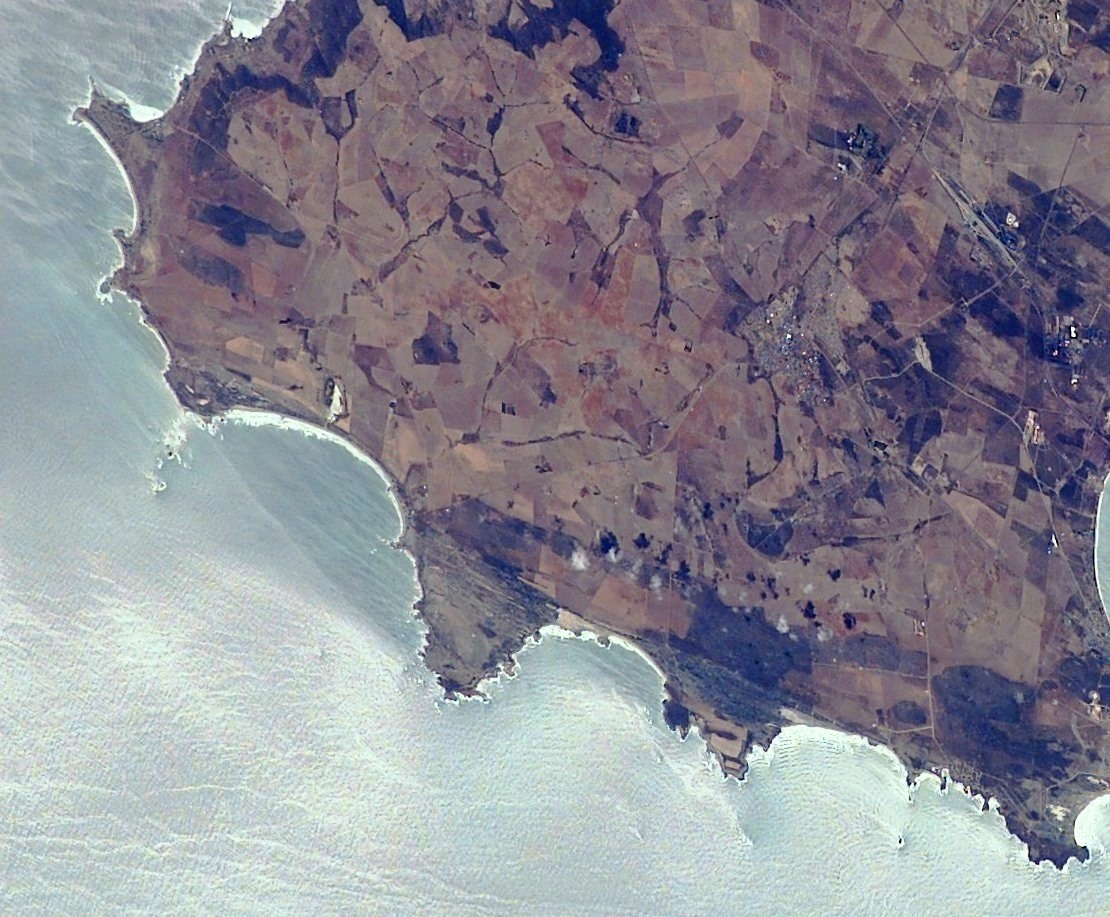
Satellite photo of the vicinity of Vredenburg and Cape Columbine.

Cape Columbine is a prominent rocky headland in the Western Cape, South Africa, that juts out into the South Atlantic Ocean. It is the most westerly point of the province, and is situated some 30 km from Vredenburg, and 170 km by road from Cape Town. It is enclosed in the Cape Columbine Nature Reserve of 263 hectares, which is situated on the stretch of coastline between St Helena Bay to the northeast and Saldanha Bay to the south, and various smaller inlets along the rugged seaboard. The neareast village is Paternoster. The nature reserve and its facilities are managed by the Saldanha Bay Municipality. It is a popular spot for hiking, camping, birdwatching and enjoyment of coastal scenery.

== Lighthouse ==
It is well known for its lighthouse, the last staffed lighthouse built on the South African coast. . The Cape Columbine Lighthouse was commissioned on October 1, 1936. Both the headland and lighthouse derive their name from the barque Columbine, that was wrecked 1.5 km North of the lighthouse on March 31, 1829 .

=== South African lighthouse firsts ===
- First to receive three navigational aids: light, a fog signal and a radio beacon.
- First lens system designed for use with a 4 kW incandescent electric lamp.

== Shipwrecks ==
Several ships were wrecked in the area, which is known for its multitude of submerged rocks and reefs.

- Columbine 1829
- Ismore 1899
- SS Saint Lawrence 1876
- SS Lisboa 1910
- SS Haddon Hall 1913
- SS Malmesbury 1930
- Haleric 1932
- Da Gama 1979
- SS Columbine 1944 (torpedoed)

== Climate ==
Climate data for Cape Columbine (1991–2020 normals)
Month	Jan	Feb	Mar	Apr	May	Jun	Jul	Aug	Sep	Oct	Nov	Dec	Year
Record high °C (°F)	40.4 (104.7)	37.5 (99.5)	36.7 (98.1)	36.0 (96.8)	31.0 (87.8)	27.8 (82.0)	26.6 (79.9)	30.1 (86.2)	34.0 (93.2)	33.2 (91.8)	36.9 (98.4)	37.2 (99.0)	40.4 (104.7)
Mean daily maximum °C (°F)	21.9 (71.4)	22.3 (72.1)	21.7 (71.1)	21.1 (70.0)	19.2 (66.6)	17.5 (63.5)	17.1 (62.8)	17.1 (62.8)	17.5 (63.5)	19.4 (66.9)	20.5 (68.9)	21.7 (71.1)	19.8 (67.6)
Daily mean °C (°F)	17.9 (64.2)	18.2 (64.8)	17.6 (63.7)	17.0 (62.6)	15.7 (60.3)	14.3 (57.7)	13.8 (56.8)	13.7 (56.7)	14.2 (57.6)	15.7 (60.3)	16.6 (61.9)	17.8 (64.0)	16.0 (60.9)
Mean daily minimum °C (°F)	13.9 (57.0)	14.1 (57.4)	13.7 (56.7)	12.9 (55.2)	12.2 (54.0)	11.1 (52.0)	10.5 (50.9)	10.4 (50.7)	11.0 (51.8)	12.0 (53.6)	12.8 (55.0)	13.8 (56.8)	12.4 (54.3)
Record low °C (°F)	6.1 (43.0)	8.3 (46.9)	5.0 (41.0)	6.0 (42.8)	4.4 (39.9)	3.9 (39.0)	2.8 (37.0)	4.4 (39.9)	1.8 (35.2)	3.3 (37.9)	3.9 (39.0)	5.0 (41.0)	1.8 (35.2)
Average precipitation mm (inches)	4 (0.2)	6 (0.2)	8 (0.3)	21 (0.8)	37 (1.5)	46 (1.8)	38 (1.5)	35 (1.4)	19 (0.7)	14 (0.6)	9 (0.4)	7 (0.3)	244 (9.6)
Average precipitation days (≥ 0.1 mm)	2.2	2.2	3.1	5.5	8.2	8.8	9.2	9.1	7.0	5.8	3.5	2.8	67.4
Average relative humidity (%) (at 14:00)	74	74	75	76	77	76	76	76	75	74	74	75	75
Source 1: Deutscher Wetterdienst (precipitation and humidity 1961–1990)
Source 2: Starlings Roost Weather

== Surrounds ==
The Columbine Nature Reserve surrounds Cape Columbine Lighthouse. On the southern side of the lighthouse is Tieties Bay (Afrikaans: Tietiesbaai). 5 km away is the fishing village of Paternoster. The coastline is well known for its sea life, especially for crawfish and abalone. Langebaan Lagoon, the West Coast National Park and a Fossil Park are located to the south.

== Selection of flora ==
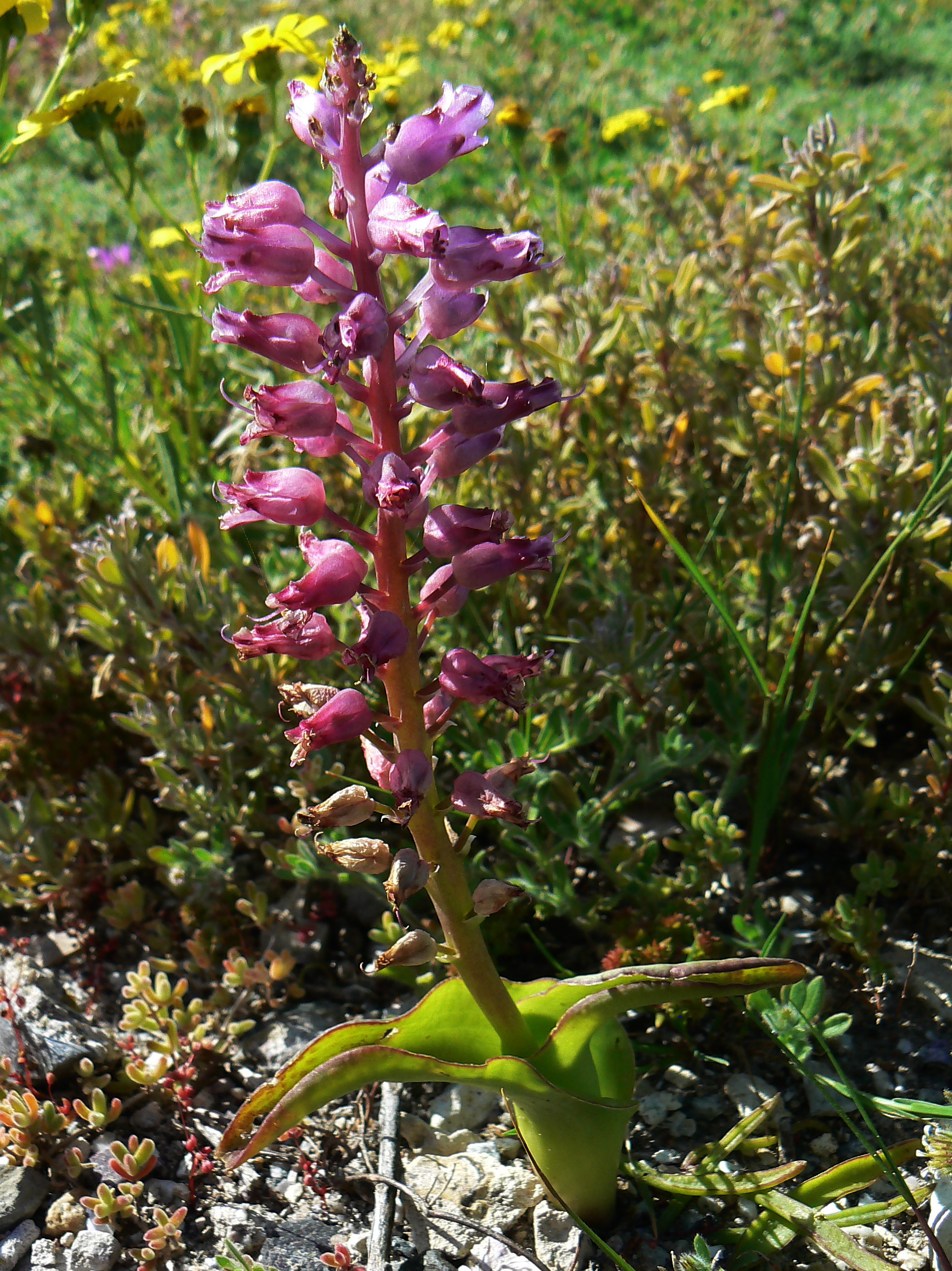
Lachenalia sp.

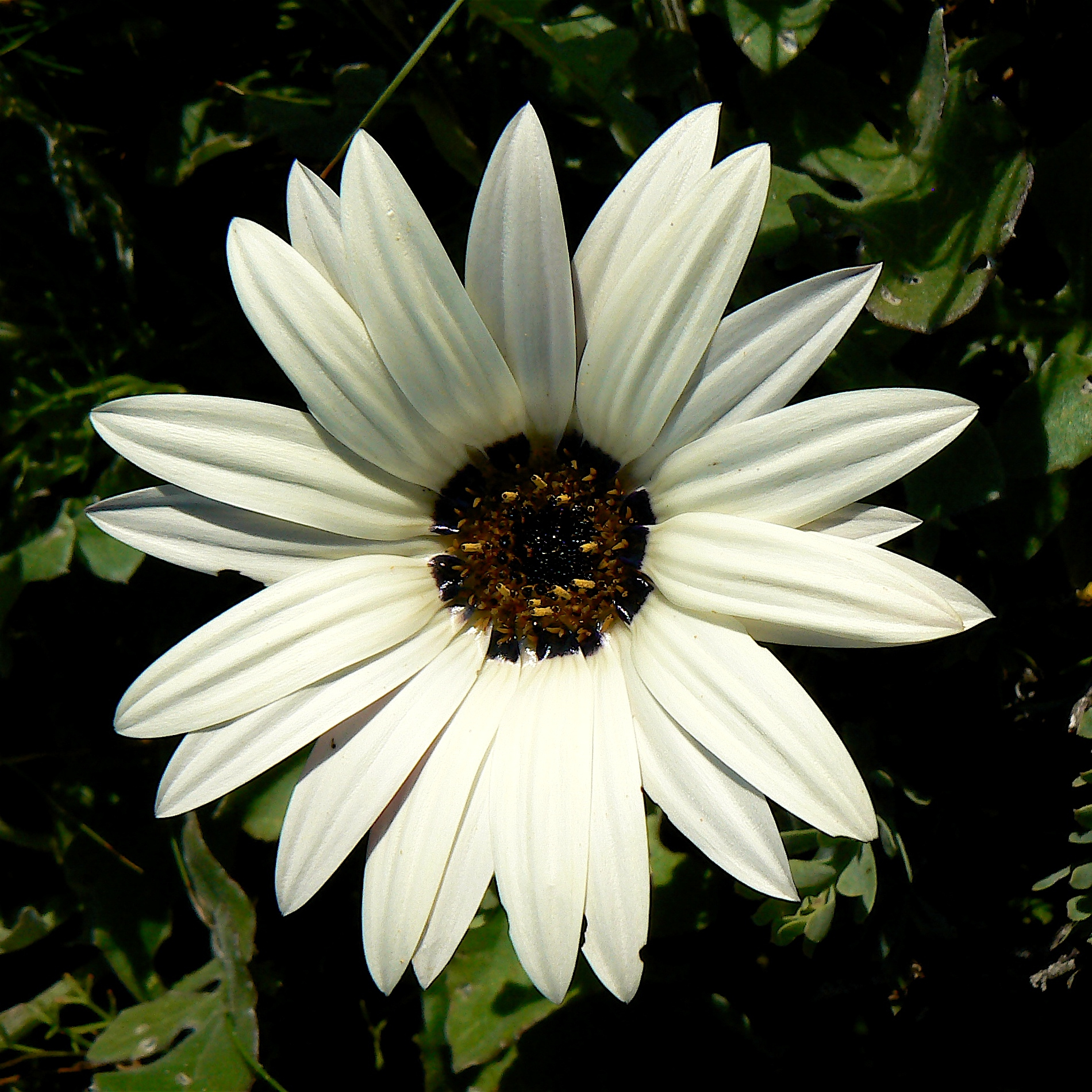

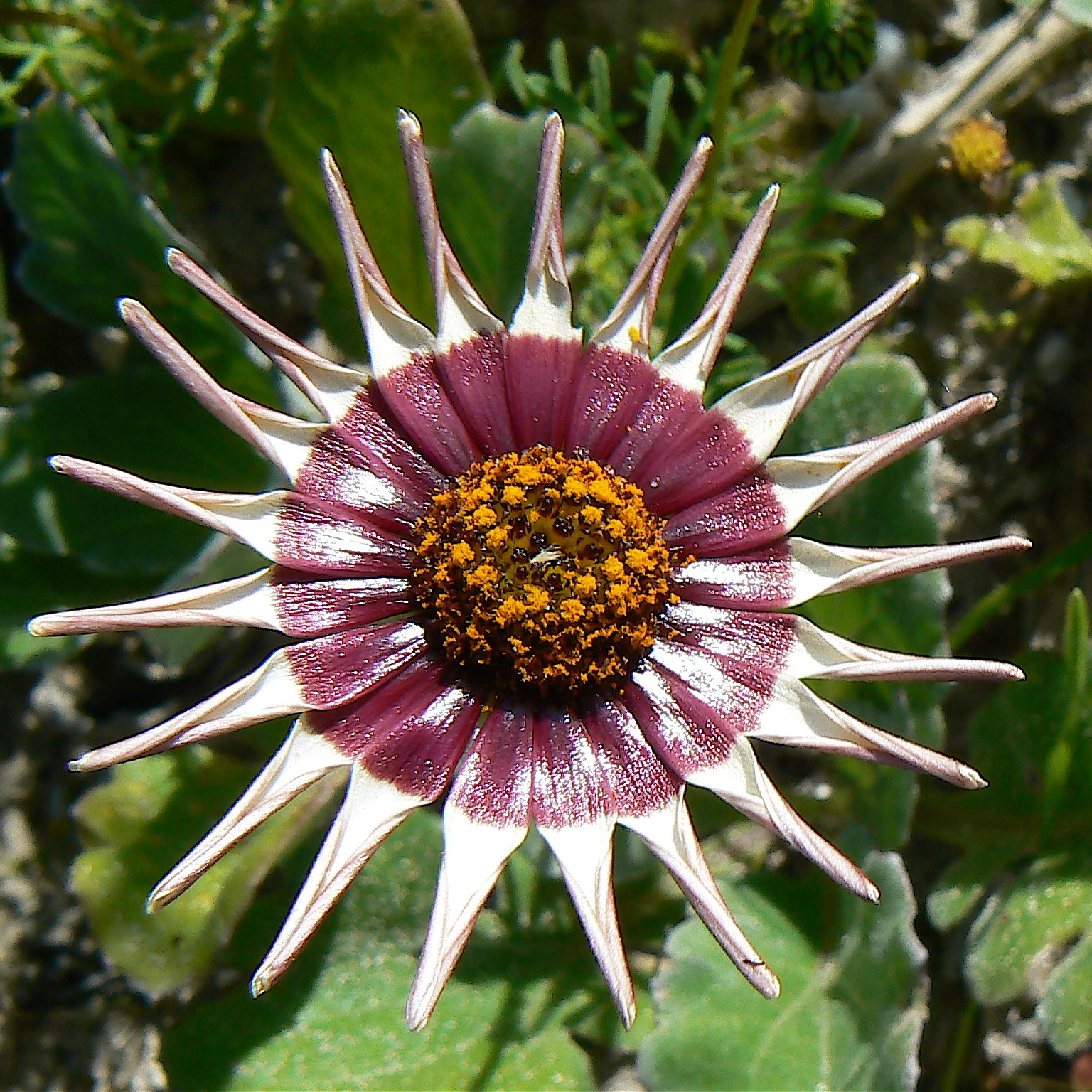

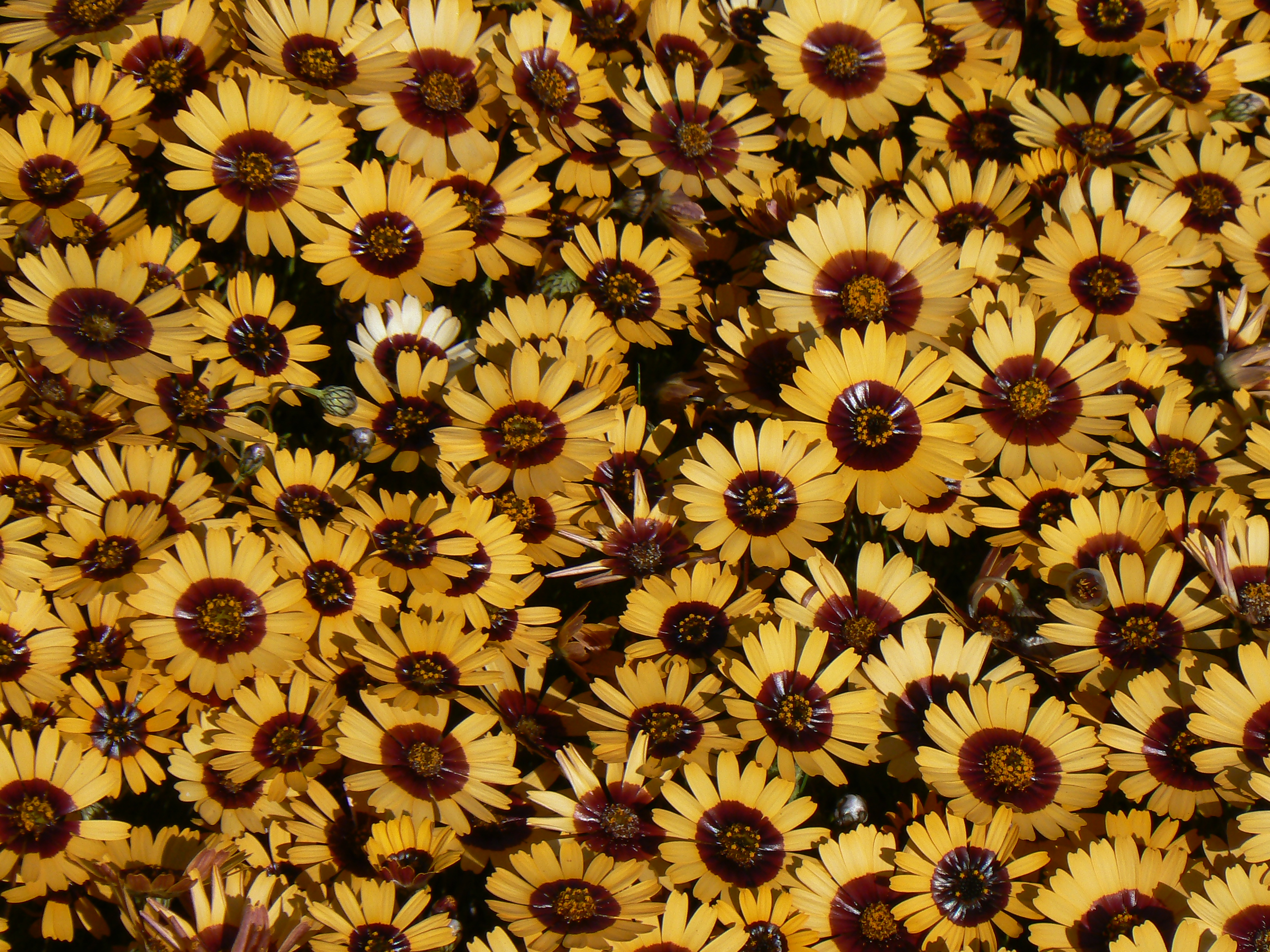
