= Mouille Point =

- Suburb of Cape Town
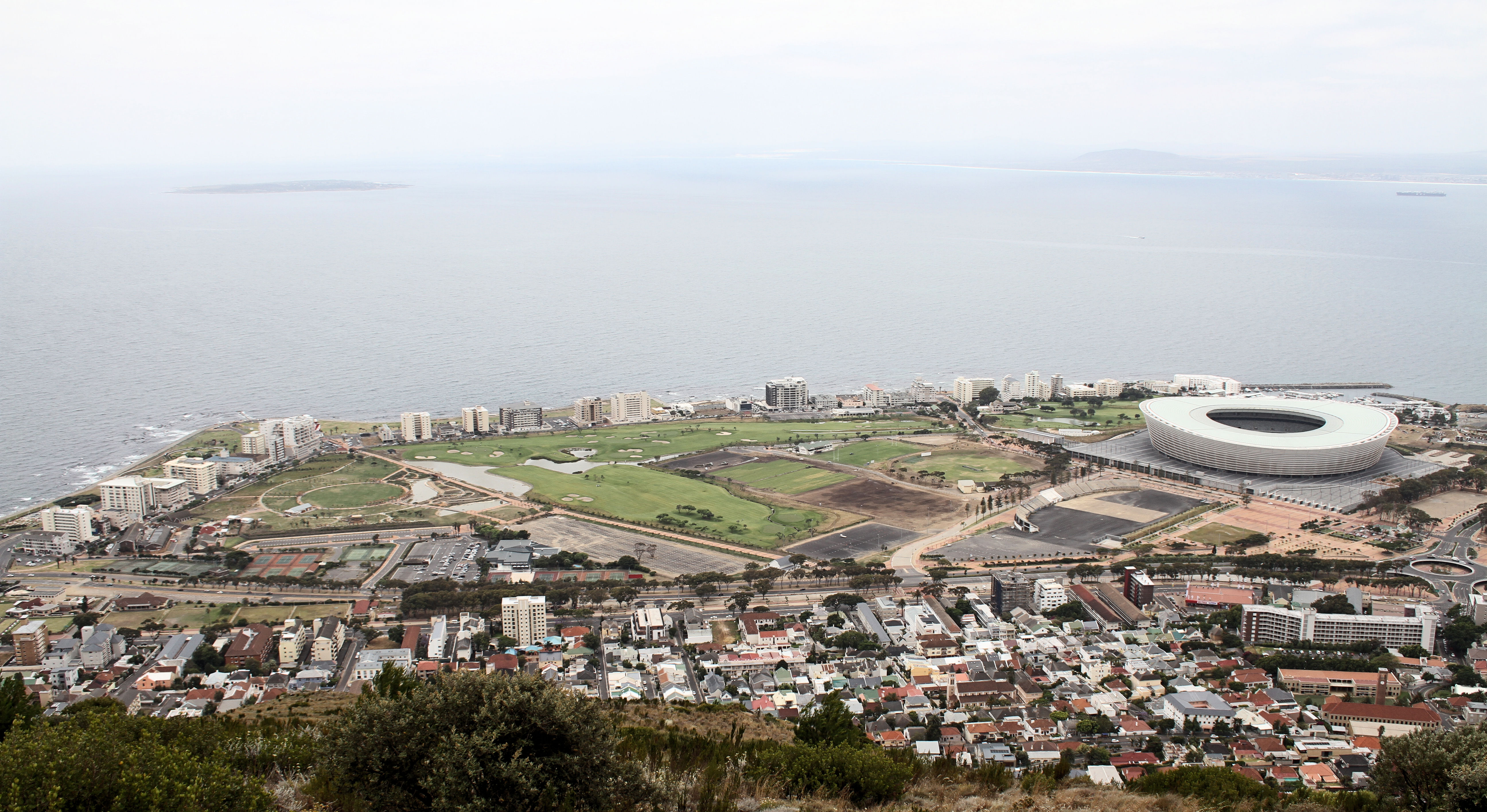
- Mouille Point along the coastline with Green Point in the foreground. Robben Island in the distance, left
- Interactive map of Mouille Point
- Coordinates: 33°54′03″S 18°24′20″E
- Country: South Africa
- Province: Western Cape
- Municipality: City of Cape Town
- Main Place: Cape Town

Area
  - Total: 0.34 km^{2} (0.13 sq mi)

Population (2011)
  - Total: 1,714
  - Density: 5,000/km^{2} (13,000/sq mi)

Racial makeup (2011)
  - Black African: 24.8%
  - Coloured: 6.9%
  - Indian/Asian: 2.6%
  - White: 59.9%
  - Other: 5.8%

First languages (2011)
  - English: 71.7%
  - Afrikaans: 15.5%
  - Xhosa: 2.1%
  - Other: 10.7%
- Time zone: UTC+2 (SAST)
- Postal code (street): n/a
- PO box: 8005
- Area code: 021

Mouille Point ("Mu-lee") is an affluent suburb of Cape Town, situated in the Atlantic Seaboard, between the Victoria and Alfred Waterfront and Granger Bay to the east, Green Point to the south and the Atlantic Ocean to the north and west. The suburb hugs the coastline and is dominated by high-end apartment blocks.

It is a very small suburb, having only two major roads (Beach Road and Bay Road). It is home to the Mouille Point promenade, a paved promenade on the coast that is used daily by thousands of Capetonians. Behind it lies the Green Point Common, where numerous playing fields and a golf course are situated. The new Green Point Urban Park & Biodiversity Garden is just behind Mouille Point and has an entrance on Bay Road.

The name "Mouille" comes from the French word for an anchoring ground. In the early 18th century ships were often swept ashore in Table Bay and the then governor decided that a breakwater (mouille in French) was needed to protect vessels at anchor. Work began in 1743. All farmers who delivered their goods to the city were required to load up their wagons with stones, drive out to Mouille Point and offload. Slaves and convicts were used to build the breakwater but after three years of labour and high seas, just 100m had been built and the project was abandoned. In 1781 the French arrived and built a battery near the unfinished mouille, naming it Mouille Point Battery.

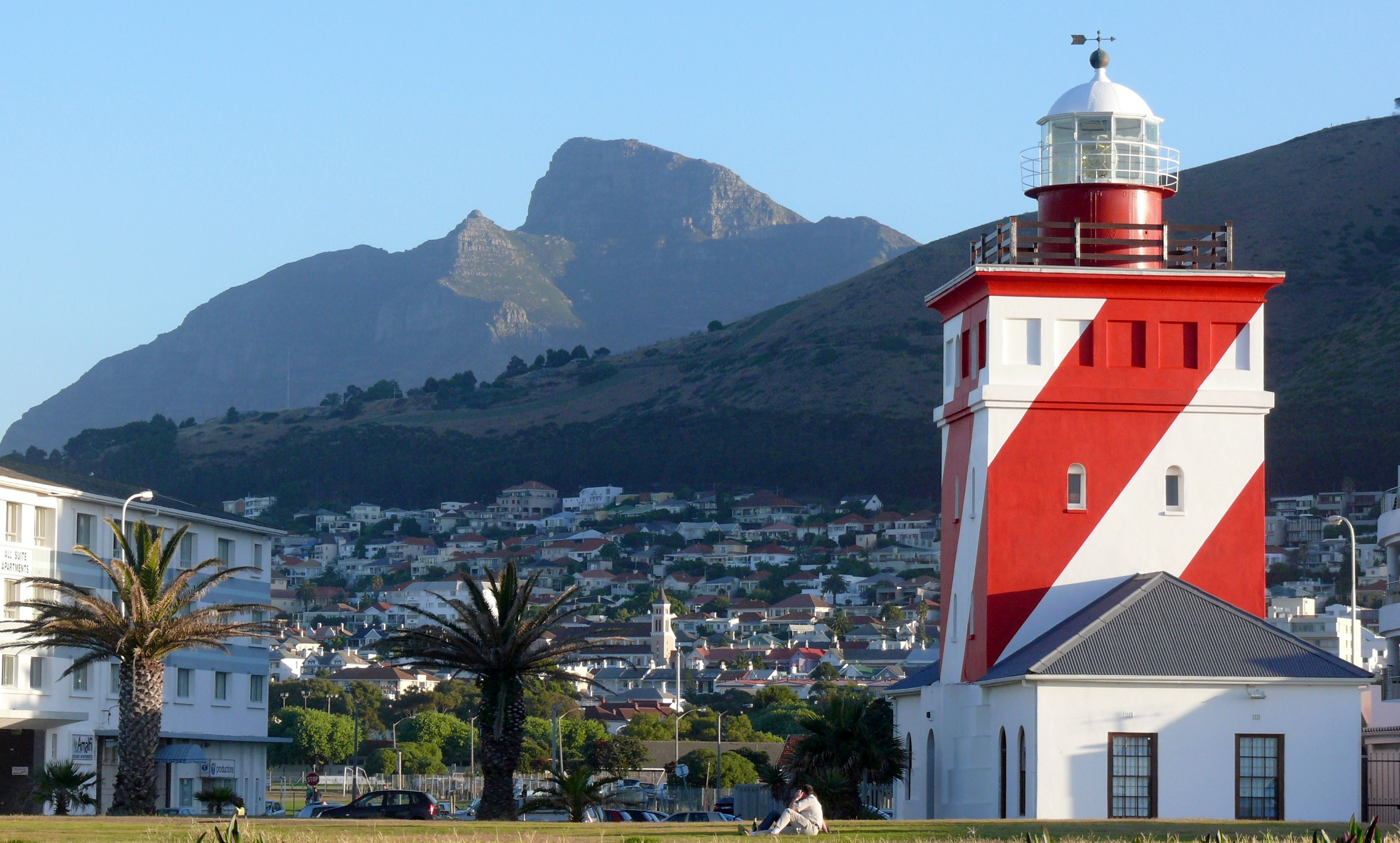
The Green Point Lighthouse with Devil's Peak as a backdrop

The Green Point lighthouse is located here but, despite this, on 1 July 1966, during a fierce winter storm, a cargo ship, the S. A. Seafarer, ran aground between Mouille Point and Three Anchor Bay. Everybody on board was rescued by helicopters of 17 squadron from AFB Ysterplaat.

The Mouille Point Lighthouse is no longer in existence. It was once located at the far end of the suburb, near Granger Bay.

For many years (c. 1960s) there was, opposite the lighthouse, a drive-in roadhouse named "The Doll House", where people used to go for a snack and coffee during the day, or after a movie at night, which was served on a tray clipped to the window of the vehicle. The local seagulls became wise to this smorgasbord and would often steal food from the rooves of the cars.

In the period May 2020 through February 2021 there were 17 apartments sold in the suburb at an average price of R 48987 / m².
