= Cape Columbine Lighthouse =

Lighthouse in South Africa

Coordinates: 32°49′40″S 17°51′20″E

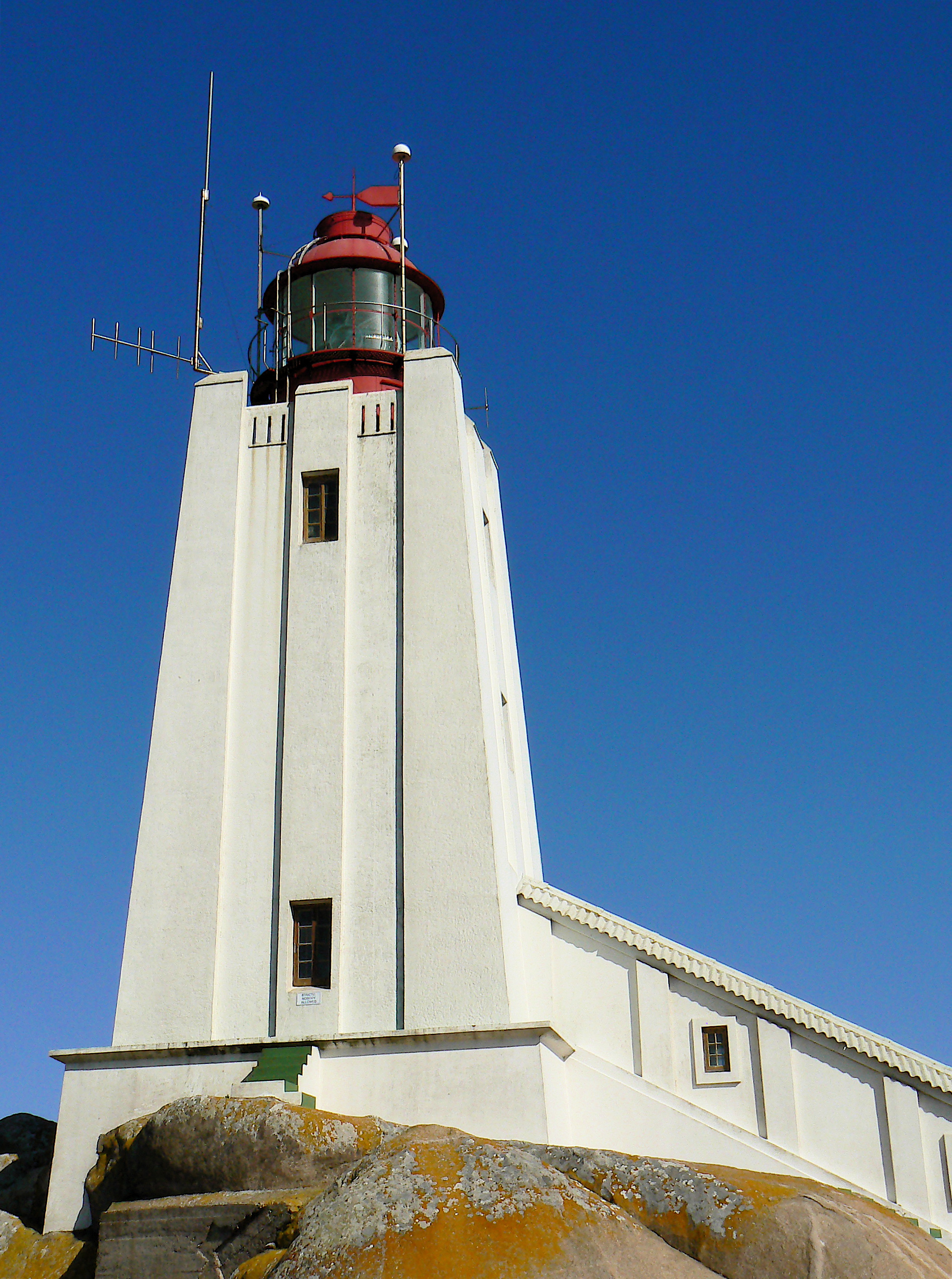

The Cape Columbine Lighthouse is a South African lighthouse on the shore of the Atlantic Ocean at Cape Columbine, about 3 km from Paternoster on the West Coast.

The 15-metre-high (49 ft) tower is made of wood. It was built in 1936 on a piece of higher ground called Castle Rock, which places the light 80 metres (260 ft) above sea level. The tower was designed and built by H. C. Cooper. It was opened by his wife at sunset on October 1, 1936.

Cape Columbine was named after the ship Columbine that sank there in 1829.

== See also ==
- List of lighthouses in South Africa
