= Mouille Point Lighthouse =

Lighthouse in Mouille Point, Cape Town, South Africa

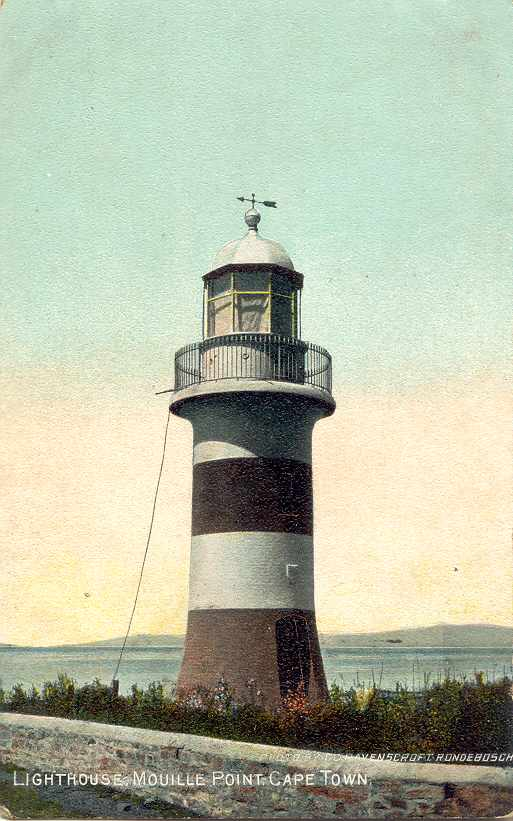
Mouille Point Lighthouse

The Mouille Point Lighthouse was a lighthouse in Mouille Point in Cape Town, South Africa, built in 1842 and demolished in 1908. It was located on the northeast side of Table Bay in Granger Bay. The dangerous rocks at Mouille Point necessitated it.

It was the second lighthouse built in South Africa after the Green Point Lighthouse (1824). It was a round stone tower, about 11 meters high. The foundation can still be seen in front of the hotel school of the Cape Peninsula University of Technology.

== See also ==
- List of lighthouses in South Africa
