= North Head Lighthouse =

North Head Lighthouse may refer to:

- North Head Light, Ilwaco, Washington, USA
- North Head Lighthouse, Saldanha Bay, Western Cape, South Africa
