= SS Ismore =

British cargo steamship wrecked near Cae Coumbine

History

United Kingdom
- Name: Ismore
- Owner: Edward Bates & Sons
- Operator: Ismore Steam Ship Co.
- Builder: Barclay, Curle & Co., Whiteinch
- Yard number: 419
- Launched: 12 April 1899
- Sponsored by: Mrs. Maclean
- Commissioned: 24 May 1899
- Home port: Liverpool
- Identification: UK Official Number 110575
- Fate: Wrecked, 3 December 1899

General characteristics
- Type: Cargo ship
- Tonnage: 7,744 GRT; 5,042 NRT; 9,500 DWT
- Length: 459 ft 0 in (139.90 m)
- Beam: 52 ft 5 in (15.98 m)
- Depth: 31 ft 1 in (9.47 m)
- Installed power: 607 Nhp
- Propulsion: Barclay, Curle & Co. 3-cylinder triple expansion
- Speed: 12.0 knots (13.8 mph; 22.2 km/h)

Ismore was a steam cargo ship built in 1899 by the Barclay, Curle & Co. of Glasgow for Edward Bates & Sons of Liverpool and operated by the Johnston Line on their trade routes between North America and the United Kingdom.

== Design and construction ==
In mid-1890s Johnston Line considered employing two extra ships of approximately 9,500 deadweight for their North American cattle trade between Montreal and Baltimore and Liverpool. Ismore was the second of theses ships, and was laid down at Barclay, Curle & Co.'s Clydeholm Yard in Whiteinch and launched on 12 April 1899 (yard number 419), with Mrs. Maclean of Ardgour being the sponsor. During her construction the vessel received extra strengthening with the view of North Atlantic trading, and had a continuous sheltered deck constructed both fore and aft to carry large quantities of cattle or light cargo. Ismore also had a water ballast placed aft to improve stability when travelling light. She had all the modern machinery fitted for quick loading and unloading of the cargo, including several powerful steam winches and a large number of derricks. Ismore had also accommodations built allowing her to carry a large number of first and second class passengers.

The ship departed Glasgow for sea trials on May 23, 1899 with a large number of guests present on board. The sea trials were held on May 24 on the Firth of Clyde and lasted for six hours, during which the ship could easily maintain an average speed of 15 knots despite rough seas and strong winds. The steamer returned to Greenock on the same day and was transferred to her owners and left for Montreal on May 27.

As built, the ship was 459 feet 0 inches (139.90 m) long (between perpendiculars) and 52 feet 5 inches (15.98 m) abeam, a mean draft of 31 feet 1 inch (9.47 m). Insmore was assessed at 7,744 GRT and 5,042 NRT and had deadweight of approximately 9,500. The vessel had a steel hull, and a single 607 nhp triple-expansion steam engine, with cylinders of 28-inch (71 cm), 47 1/2-inch (121 cm) and 78-inch (200 cm) diameter with a 60-inch (150 cm) stroke, that drove a single screw propeller, and moved the ship at up to 12.0 knots (13.8 mph; 22.2 km/h).

To operate the vessel, a holding company, Ismore Steamship Company, Ltd. was registered in Liverpool on April 19, 1899 with capital of £30,100.

== Operational history ==
Upon delivery Ismore was chartered to the Johnston Line, and departed Glasgow for Montreal in ballast on May 27, 1899 and reached her destination on June 10. After loading a large general cargo and 805 oxen she departed for her return trip on June 15 and arrived at Liverpool on July 1, concluding her maiden voyage.

On her next trip she left Montreal on July 20 with a cargo consisting of 805 heads of cattle, 10,355 sacks of flour, 84,239 bushels of corn and 14,779 boxes of cheese and arrived at Liverpool on July 30. When entering the port, Ismore collided with steamer SS Dunconnell, with both vessels receiving only minor damage. On her third trip, Ismore arrived at Hampton Roads on August 17, and got grounded at Pinners Point on August 18 when the hurricane struck the city. She was pulled off the mud with the help of several tugs and proceeded to Norfolk to load her cargo of 5,254 bales of cotton, grain and other general cargo. She again visited Norfolk in early October and left with 477 heads of cattle, 4,492 bales of cotton and other general cargo arriving in Liverpool on October 18.

On October 16 it was announced that Ismore with a number of other vessels was chartered by the Imperial government to transport troops and stores to South Africa as the war against the Boers got under way.

=== In the Imperial Government Service ===
After unloading her cargo, Ismore had to be modified into a transport, which was done in eleven days. On November 4, the vessel embarked 455 men of the 63rd Field Battery, No.9 Company of R.A.M. Corps, "A" Squadron of 10th Hussars, and one troop of "B" Squadron, plus 6 field guns, 334 horses and 22 vehicles, stores and ammunition, and sailed for South Africa in the early morning of November 6 under command of captain Frederick Crosby.

=== Sinking ===
On leaving the port the ship encountered rough seas and high wind and had to put into Moelfre Bay to wait out the weather, where she remained until the evening of November 8. She only was able to proceed as far as Milford Haven as the rough weather persisted and the horses became sick. Finally, the weather improved and Ismore departed Milford on November 11. The steamer coaled at Tenerife on November 16, and from there continued directly to Cape Town. The journey was largely uneventful. On 2 December at around noon, the ship's position was determined by observation to be approximately 30°41′S 15°30′E, and the course was set to pass the Dassen Island Lighthouse about 13 miles distant. At around 02:38 on 3 December, Ismore struck on submerged rocks just off Columbine Point and got stranded. She immediately started to take on water filling her engine room and extinguishing the fires. The lifeboats were lowered and the ship was abandoned. The area where the ship went ashore was littered with rocks and it took a considerable effort to reach land, but the wrecked steamer was only about 3/4 mile (1.2 km) from the shore, and the military men were able to go back to the ship during the day to retrieve some clothing, ammunition and weapons as well as release some horses. Around 02:30 on 4 December Ismore broke amidships with only her stern remaining afloat. Only about twenty horses managed to get ashore with the rest going down with the ship.

An inquiry into the wrecking was held in December 1899 at Cape Town, which found both the captain and the second mate to be at fault and negligent in their conduct, as they failed to use the lead to ascertain the ship's position, disregarded a strong northeast current present in the area which carried the ship closer to the shore, and failure to act when land was spotted on the port side about 8 minutes before the disaster. Captain Crosby had his license suspended for six month, and the second mate was severely censured.
