= North Head Lighthouse, Saldanha Bay =

Saldanha Bay North Head Saldanhabaai
- Location: Saldanha, West Coast District Municipality, Western Cape; South Africa
- Coordinates: 33°03′02.2″S 17°54′39.1″E

Tower
- Constructed: 1939 (first)
- Construction: masonry tower
- Height: 21 metres (69 ft)
- Shape: cylindrical tower with balcony and small lantern
- Markings: tower with black and white spiral bands, white lantern

Light
- First lit: 2005 (current)
- Focal height: 32 metres (105 ft)
- Lens: 250 mm catadioptric
- Intensity: 511,000 cd
- Range: 23 nautical miles (43 km; 26 mi)
- Characteristic: Fl (3) W 20s.

The first North Head Lighthouse on the northern side of the Saldanha Bay entrance, in South Africa, was a 300mm AGA acetylene gas lantern mounted on a square concrete pillar, installed on December 7, 1939. It had a small diaphone fog signal.

A new aluminium tower came into operation on 1969-12-02, about 100 metres from the previous lighthouse. The fully automatic revolving electric optic is powered by triple mutual diesel/alternator sets. The lighthouse is monitored at Cape Columbine.

== See also ==
- List of lighthouses in South Africa
- Almost identical South Head Lighthouse, Saldanha Bay
