= Milnerton Lighthouse =

Lighthouse on the shore of Table Bay in South Africa

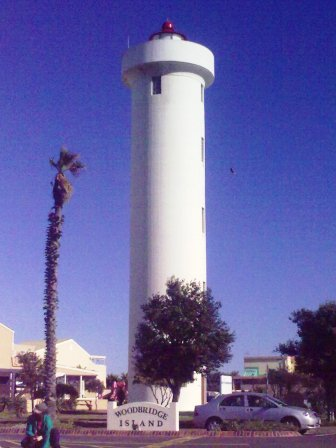
- Location: Milnerton; Western Cape; South Africa
- Coordinates: 33°52′54.1″S 18°29′16.1″E

Tower
- Constructed: 1960
- Construction: concrete tower
- Height: 21 metres (69 ft)
- Shape: cylindrical with balcony and small lantern
- Markings: white tower, red lantern roof

Light
- First lit: 10 March 1960
- Focal height: 38 metres (125 ft)
- Intensity: 800,000 cd
- Range: 25 nautical miles (46 km; 29 mi)
- Characteristic: Fl (3) W 20s.

The Milnerton Lighthouse, commissioned on 1960-03-10, is located on Table Bay shore in Milnerton, South Africa. Its red sector covers Robben Island.

== See also ==
- List of lighthouses in South Africa
