= Stompneus Bay =

Stompneus Bay Stompneusbaai
- Location within Western Cape Location within South Africa
- Coordinates: 32.733°S 17.966°E
- Country: South Africa
- Province: Western Cape
- District: West Coast
- Municipality: Saldanha Bay
- Time zone: UTC+2 (SAST)
- PO box: 7382
- Area code: 022

Stompneus Bay (Afrikaans: Stompneusbaai) is a village east of Shell Bay Point, 7 km north-west of St Helena Bay and 20 km north of Vredenburg. Named after a type of fish, Chrysophrys globiceps. The form Stompneusbaai is preferred for official purposes.
