= Port Shepstone Lighthouse =

Lighthouse in Port Shepstone, South Africa

Coordinates: 30°44′31″S 30°27′32″E

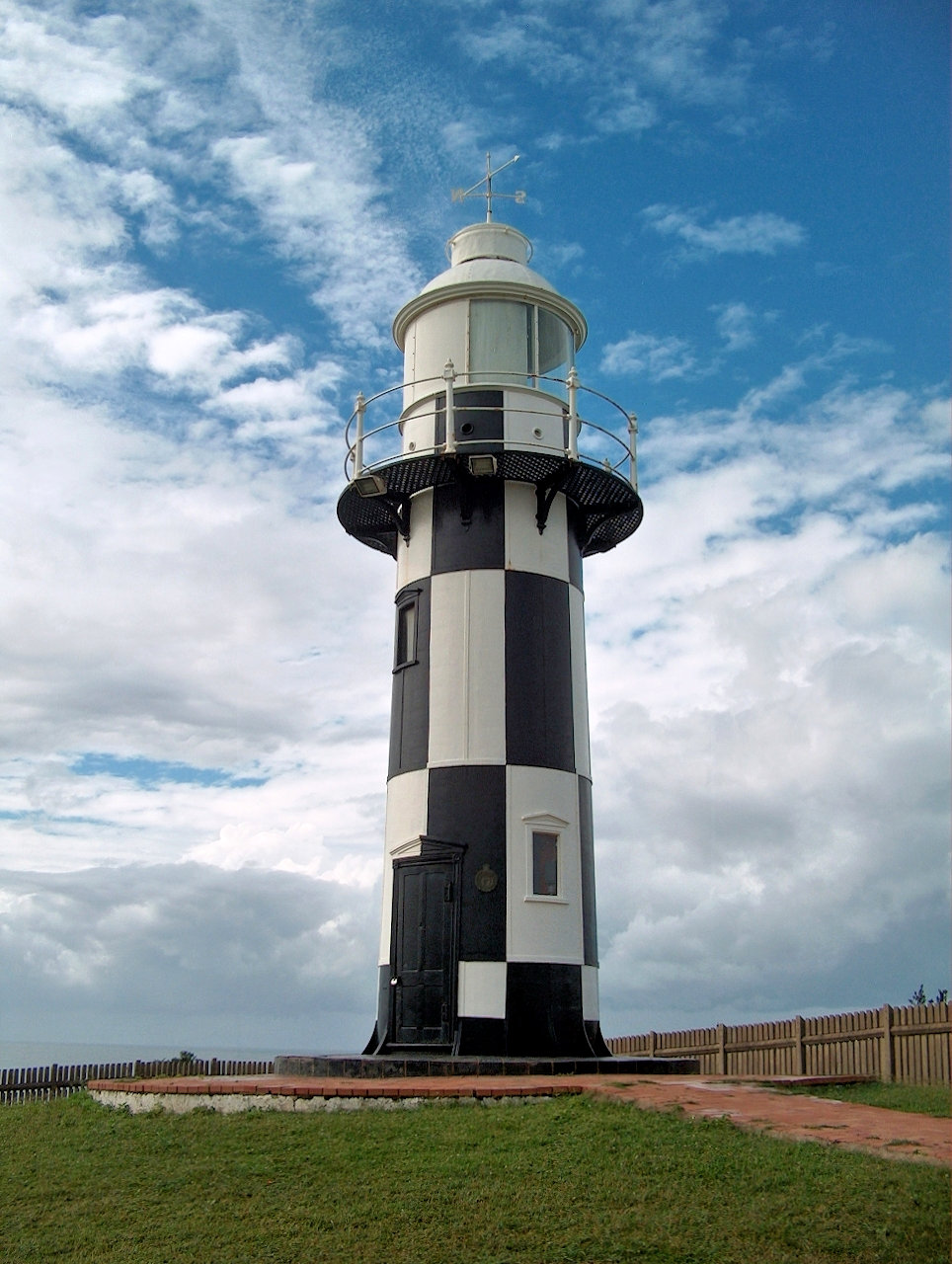
Port Shepstone Lighthouse

The Port Shepstone Lighthouse is an 8 m high, round cast iron tower in Port Shepstone, at the mouth of the Umzimkulu River on the south coast of KwaZulu-Natal, South Africa. It was commissioned on 10 March 1905.

The lighthouse is painted with a checkered black and white pattern. The electric light, mounted on a rotating system, produces 1,130,000 CD and can be seen 26 nautical miles away. The light flashes once every 6 seconds and has a focal plane of 24 m above the high water mark.

The lighthouse was originally located at Scottburgh, at the southern end of Aliwal Shoal (site of several ship wrecks), and later transferred to its current position.

The lighthouse was declared a national monument in 1995.

The lighthouse replaced an earlier signal station, set up in 1895, which had a ship masthead lantern at the top of a ladder-like structure.

== See also ==
- List of lighthouses in South Africa
