= Robben Island Lighthouse =

Lighthouse in Robben Island, Table Bay, South Africa

Coordinates: 33°48′53″S 18°22′27″E

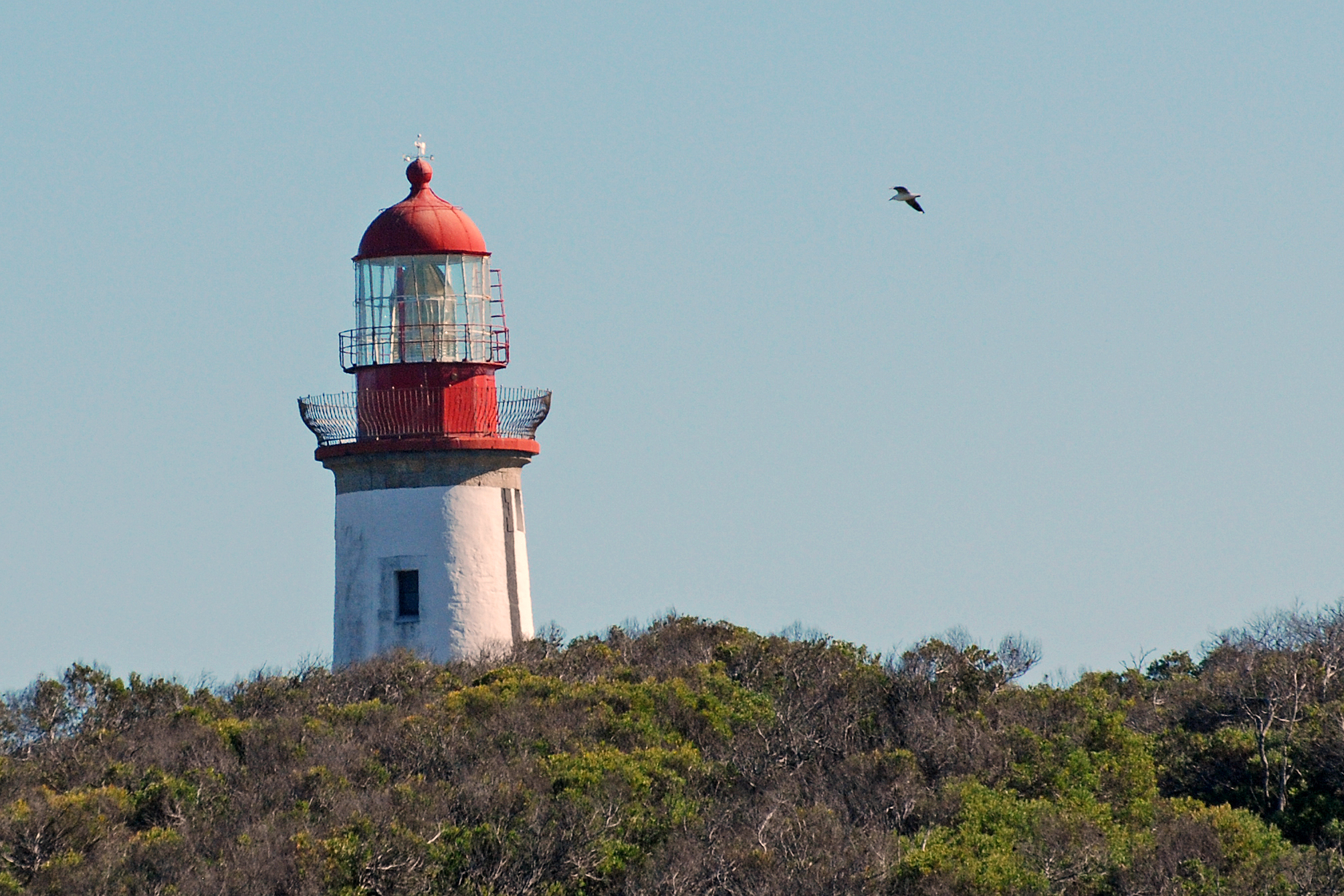

The Robben Island Lighthouse is a lighthouse on Robben Island in Table Bay near Cape Town.

== History ==
It was completed in January 1865 and is located on the highest part of Robben Island, Mintoheuwel. Before the construction of the lighthouse, fires were made on the hill to warn sailors of the island's location and the hill was then also known as Vuurberg.

The first navigation light (Dutch: "vuyrbaecken") south of the equator was also the first attempt at a lighthouse in South Africa. It was really just a wooden scaffolding on which burning spike rings were placed at night. Because pitch rings were uneconomical, they switched to wood fires and later coal. In the 18th century wax candles were used.

The first real lighthouse in South Africa was put into operation on the night of 12 April 1824. It was at Green Point in Table Bay. The lamp of this lighthouse burned with whale oil.

== Flashing lighthouse ==
The lighthouse, which was erected in 1865, is the only lighthouse in South Africa that flashes and does not rotate. The lighthouse is 18 meters high and was electrified in 1938. The light can be seen 25 kilometers away.

== See also ==
- List of lighthouses in South Africa
