= Green Point Lighthouse, KwaZulu-Natal =

Green Point Lighthouse (KwaZulu-Natal) Clansthal
- Location: Clansthal; KwaZulu-Natal; South Africa
- Coordinates: 30°14′56.8″S 30°46′38.1″E

Tower
- Constructed: 1905
- Construction: cast iron tower
- Height: 21 metres (69 ft)
- Shape: tapered cylindrical tower with double balcony and lantern
- Markings: tower with red and white bands, white lantern
- Power source: mains electricity

Light
- Focal height: 85 metres (279 ft)
- Lens: Fresnel lens

The Green Point Lighthouse is a provincial heritage site in Clansthal in the KwaZulu-Natal province of South Africa.

In 1995 it was described in the Government Gazette as an "unusual cast-iron structure, erected in 1905, [...] the oldest lighthouse on the KwaZulu-Natal coast."

== Senior lightkeepers ==
from	until	years	name
1905	~1918	~13	C G Johnson
1918-10			E D Bayes
1921-03-31			J R Clingen
1926-03-31	1929-03-31	3	D Hurley
1930-03-31	1939-07-05	9	C H Cornish
1941-03-31	1948-09-20	7	T McInerney
1948-09-15	1952-10-26	4	E L Andreason
1953	1956	~3	J C Addison
1956-01-06	1956-12-05	0	H H Hews
1957-01-12	1960-01-18	3	W A Hews
1960-01-18	1963-02	3	F C Miller
1961-11-28			converted to automatic operation

== See also ==
- List of lighthouses in South Africa
