= West Coast, Western Cape =

Geographic region in western South Africa

The West Coast is a region of the Western Cape province in South Africa and is bordered by the Atlantic Ocean on the west and the Swartland region on the east.

The region stretches for over 400 km from north to south and is known for its scenery and fertile fishing grounds. The main towns in this region are Saldanha, Paternoster, Vredenburg, Velddrif, St. Helena Bay, Langebaan, Hopefield, Darling and Yzerfontein. The region's main nature reserve is the West Coast National Park.

West Coast scenes

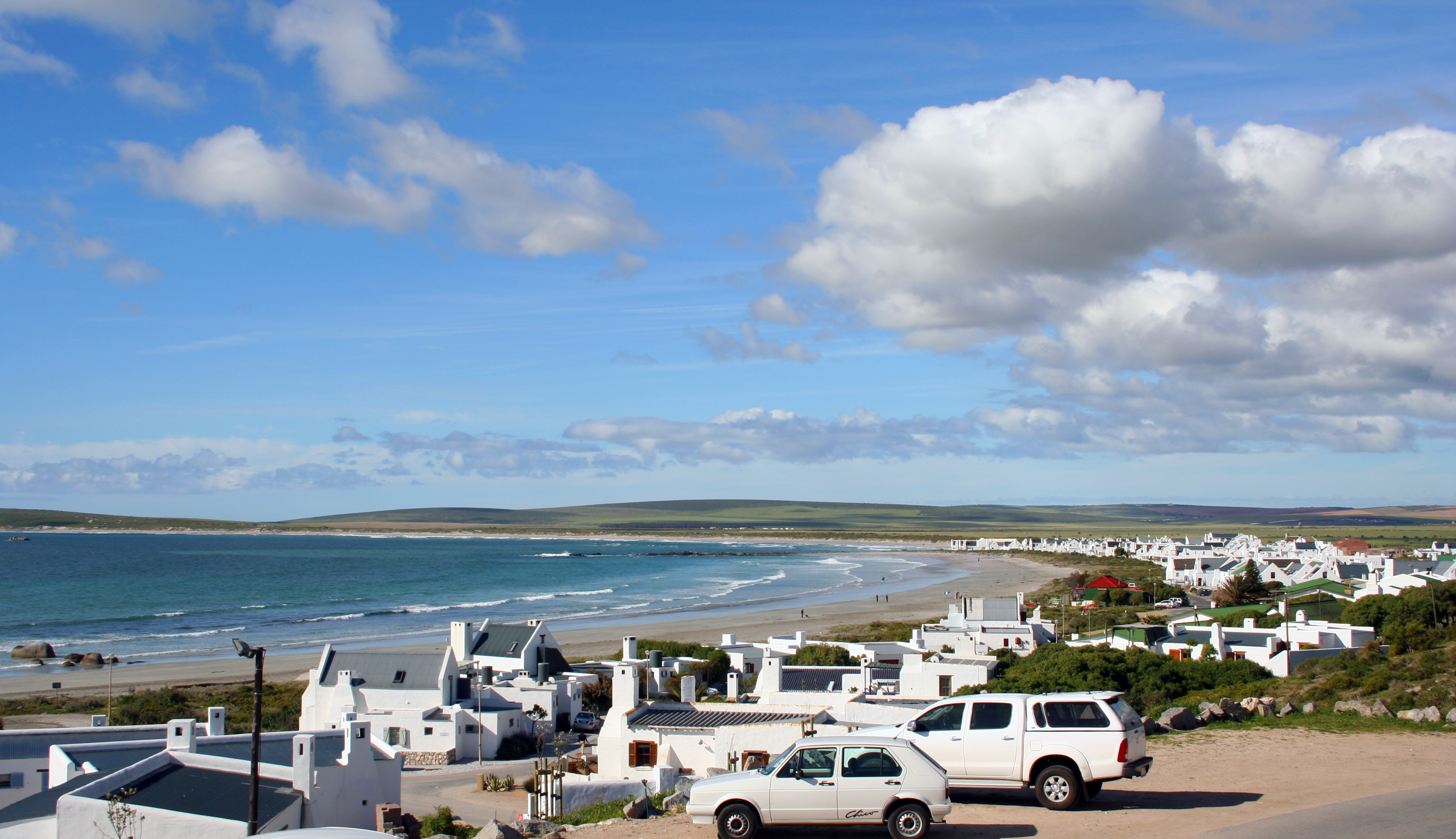
White fisherman's cottages of Paternoster

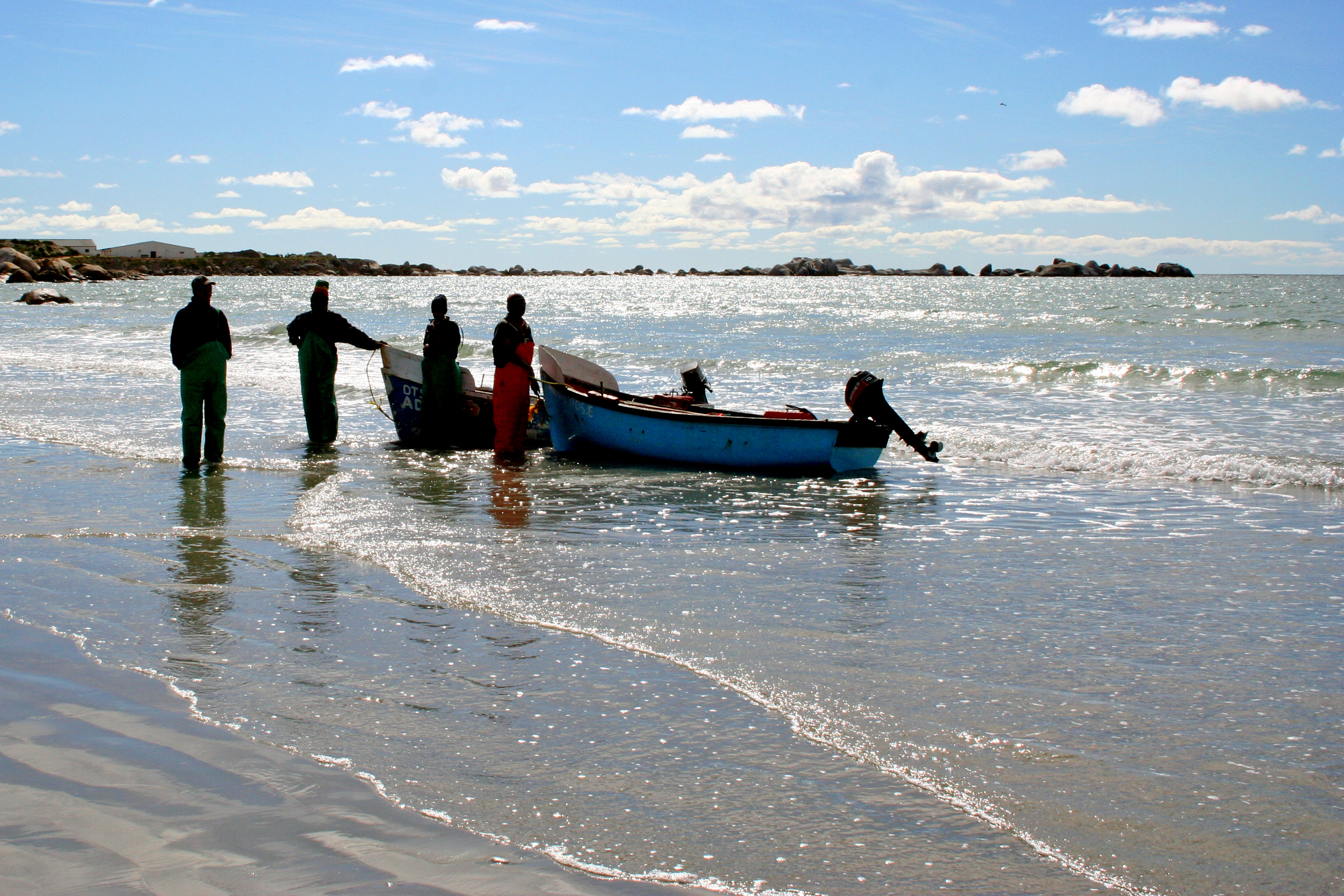
Fishermen on the West Coast shore.

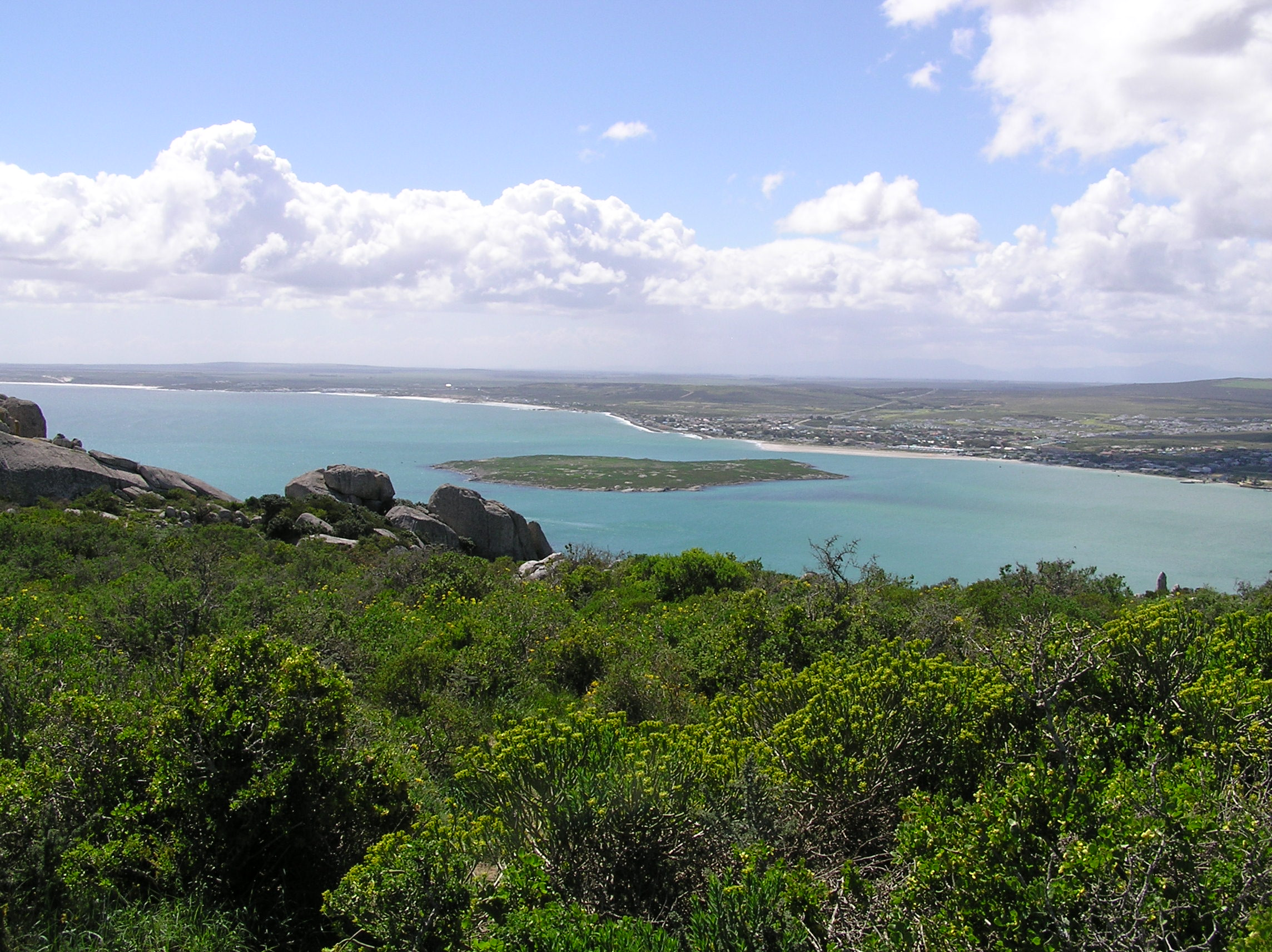
Langebaan Lagoon
