= Dassen Island Lighthouse =

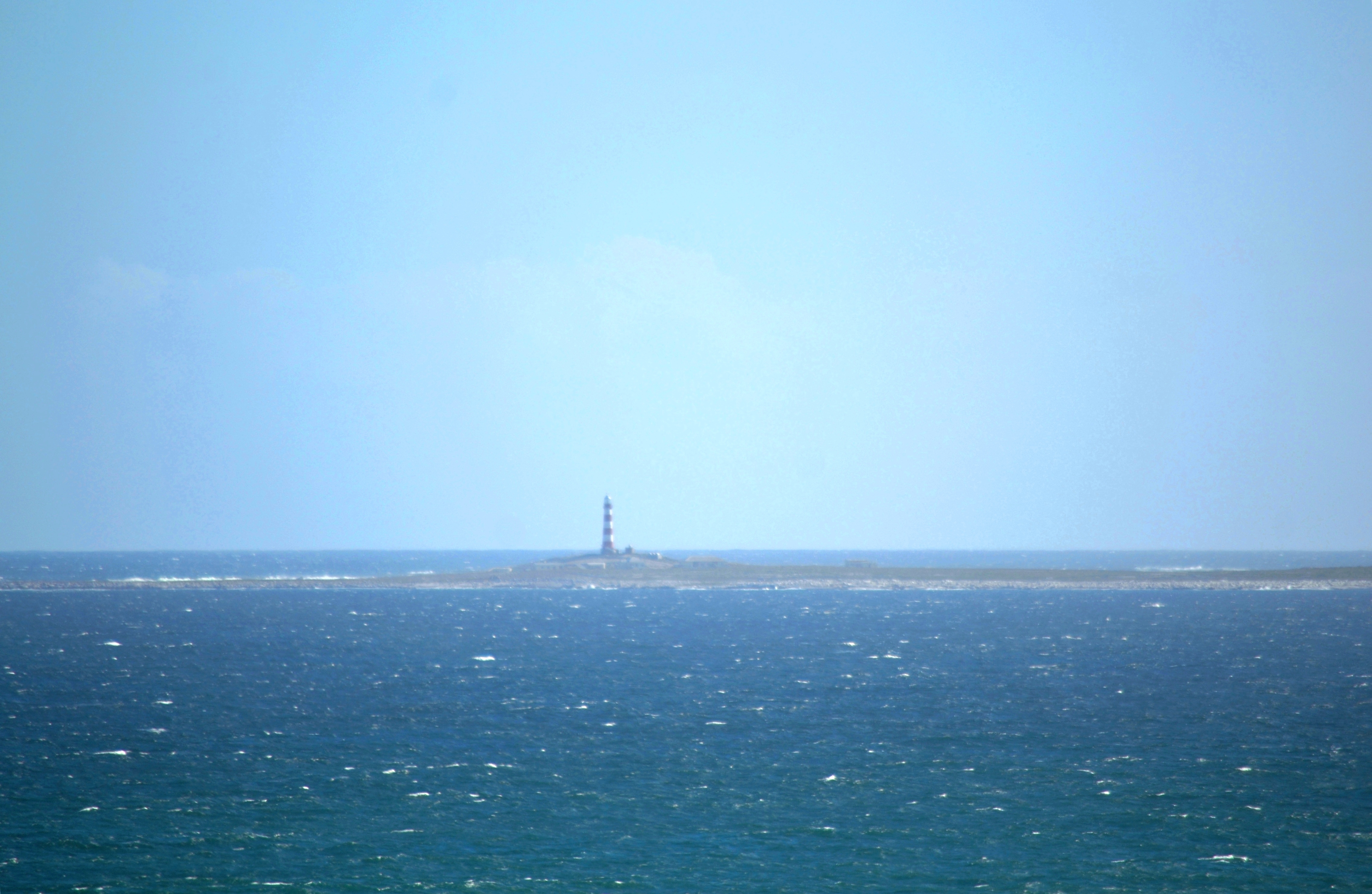
- Dassen Island and lighthouse, 9 km (6 mi) off the coast of Yzerfontein
- Location: Yzerfontein; Western Cape; South Africa
- Coordinates: 33°25′57.13″S 18°05′20.72″E

Tower
- Constructed: 1893
- Construction: Cast-iron tower
- Height: 29 metres (95 ft)
- Shape: Circular prism tower with balcony and lantern
- Markings: White tower, red bands
- Power source: mains electricity

Light
- First lit: 15 April 1893
- Focal height: 47 metres (154 ft)
- Intensity: 1,400,000 cd
- Range: 24 nautical miles (44 km; 28 mi)
- Characteristic: Fl(2) W 30s

Dassen Island Lighthouse is a lighthouse situated on Dassen Island, west of Yzerfontein. It is a white circular cast-iron tower that has been in use since 1893.

== History ==
The lighthouse is found on the southern point of Dassen Island, off the western coast of South Africa, 55 km north-west of Cape Town and 11 km west of Yzerfontein. It was installed on 15 April 1893. The lighthouse consists of a circular cast-iron tower that is painted in white and red bands and stands atop a brick base to height of 28 m.

The light house signals two white flashes, separated by 10 s, every 30 s. The fog horn blasts for five seconds every fifteen seconds. The lighthouse is staffed at all times. The island is closed to the general public, but can be visited by special permit.
