= St Helena Bay =

Settlement in West Coast District Municipality, Western Cape, South Africa

Saint Helena Bay St. Helenabaai
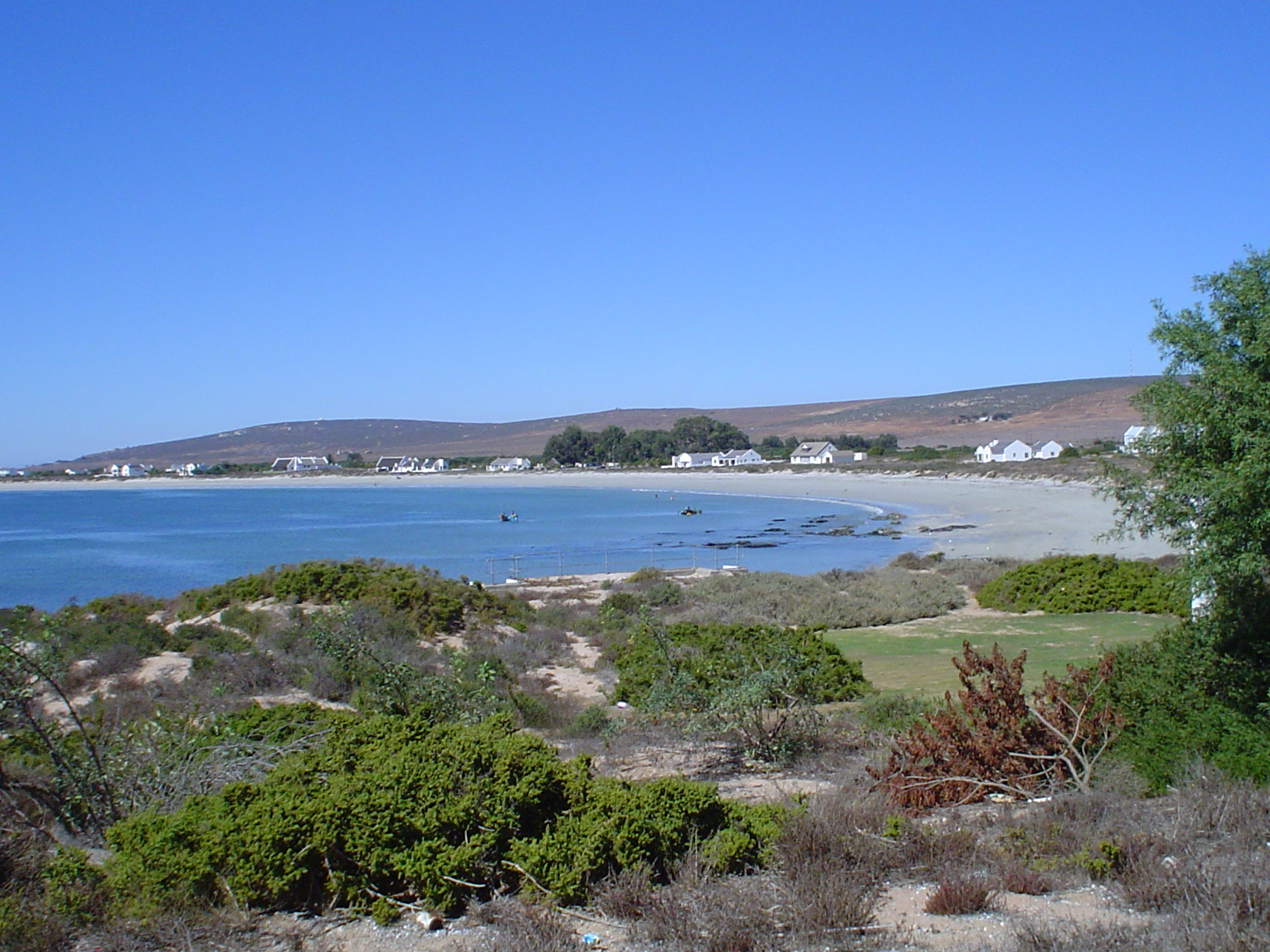
- View of Britannia Bay west of St Helena Bay

- Location within Western Cape Location within South Africa
- Coordinates: 32°45′30″S 18°01′40″E
- Country: South Africa
- Province: Western Cape
- District: West Coast
- Municipality: Saldanha Bay

Area
  - Total: 26.92 km^{2} (10.39 sq mi)

Population (2011)
  - Total: 11,529
  - Density: 428.3/km^{2} (1,109/sq mi)

Racial makeup (2011)
  - Black African: 29.7%
  - Coloured: 59.3%
  - Indian/Asian: 0.3%
  - White: 10.3%
  - Other: 0.5%

First languages (2011)
  - Afrikaans: 68.9%
  - Xhosa: 25.7%
  - English: 3.5%
  - Other: 1.9%
- Time zone: UTC+2 (SAST)
- Postal code (street): 7390

Saint Helena Bay (Afrikaans: St. Helenabaai) is a settlement in West Coast District Municipality in the Western Cape province of South Africa.

Nicknamed by locals as Agterbaai, the town is located on the shore of the bay, from which it derives its name and is approximately 150 km north of Cape Town, South Africa. It surrounds the towns of Vredenburg and Paternoster, and is located across the bay from Laaiplek.

== History ==
Historically, Saint Helena Bay is the location where Vasco da Gama, first set foot in South Africa. The date of this event was recorded as 7 November, 1497. The bay was named Bahia de Santa Helena (Portuguese for its current name) after Saint Helena a devout, influential Christian and mother of Constantine I. During this time the Portuguese explorers and the local Khoikhoi became involved in a skirmish wounding Da Gama in the thigh.

The Dutch East India Company established an outpost at St Helena Bay in the 17th century, the Free Burghers fished there and ships from the settlement at the Cape frequently traveled to the area in search of resources to sustain the settlement. In 1673 during the 2nd Khoikhoi War the Cochoquas under the leadership of Gonnema attacked the outpost resulting in an escalation during the war.

== Agriculture ==
Saint Helena Bay is a major fishing town. It is home to Sandy Point Harbor – one of two ports in the bay, (the other being Laaiplek). In winter it hosts many fishing activities, where snoek is caught, as well as an endangered species of rock lobster and crayfish.

The bay is high in pelagic fish, and has eleven fish processing factories.

== Geographic ==
Saint Helena Bay is the only area along the South African West Coast where the sun rises across the bay. The reason for this is its unique location, the town itself faces north east and almost north.

It is described as "calm and tranquil" as quoted from the Portuguese explorer, Vasco da Gama.

The region of Saint Helena Bay is sub-divided into various suburbs, namely (from east to west): Laingville, West Point, Steenberg's Cove, Hannasbaai, Britanica Heights, Harbour Lights, Sandy Point, Blueberry Hill, Columbine, Mid-West and it incorporates the neighboring towns of Stompneusbaai and Britannia Bay. It includes a total of eighteen smaller bays.

== Tourism and events ==
On the actual site of Vasco da Gama's arrival is a monument. Other attractions include dolphin and whale watching as well as sightseeing.

Saint Helena Bay is a regular host to the St Helenabaai Seefees, (Afrikaans, translated as St Helena Bay Sea Festival). This event is hosted by the town's Tourism association and takes place annually in December during the South African summer.

Nearby is the Cape Columbine Lighthouse (19.7 km from St Helena Bay).

== Sport ==
To the west of Saint Helena Bay, is a secure golfing estate known as Shelley Point.

== Popular figures ==
Saint Helena Bay is noted as a popular destination for former South African Rugby Union player, Kobus Wiese, who owns property in the region. In February 2012, South African TV personality and soap opera star Hildegardt Whites (who plays the role of Bonita Meintjies in 7de Laan) married Polish-born musician Kuba Silkiewicz in Shelly Point, St Helena Bay. Whites grew up in the West Coast during her teen years.
