= Green Point Lighthouse, Cape Town =

Lighthouse in Cape Town, South Africa

Green Point Lighthouse
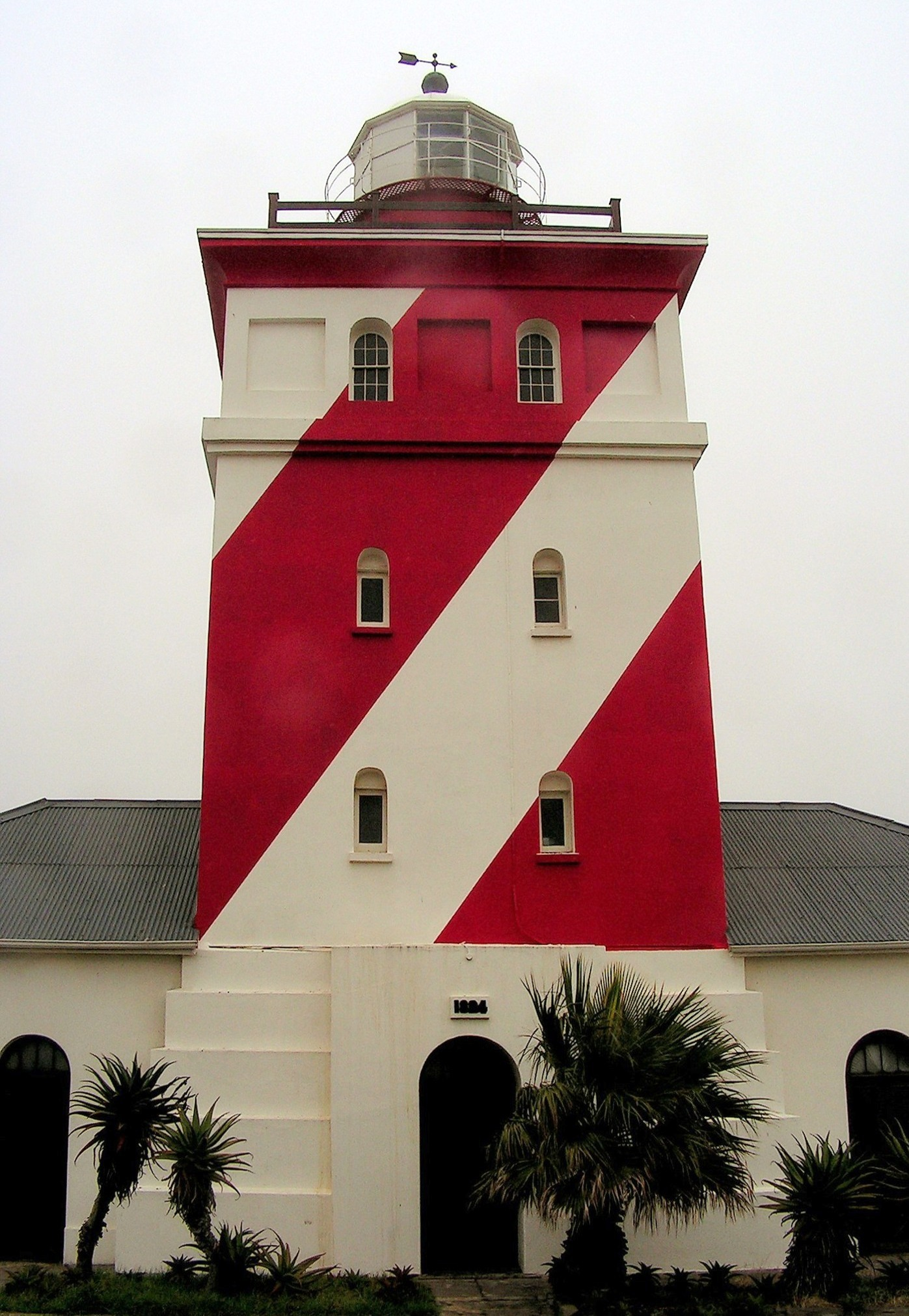
- Location: Cape Town; South Africa
- Coordinates: 33°54′05.07″S 18°23′59.79″E

Tower
- Constructed: 1824
- Construction: masonry tower
- Height: 16 metres (52 ft)
- Shape: square tower with balcony and lantern rising from one-story keeper's house
- Markings: tower with red and white diagonal bands
- Heritage: provincial heritage site
- Fog signal: Horn

Light
- First lit: 24 April 1824
- Focal height: 20 metres (66 ft)
- Intensity: 850,000 candela
- Range: 25 nmi (46 km; 29 mi)
- Characteristic: Fl W 10s.

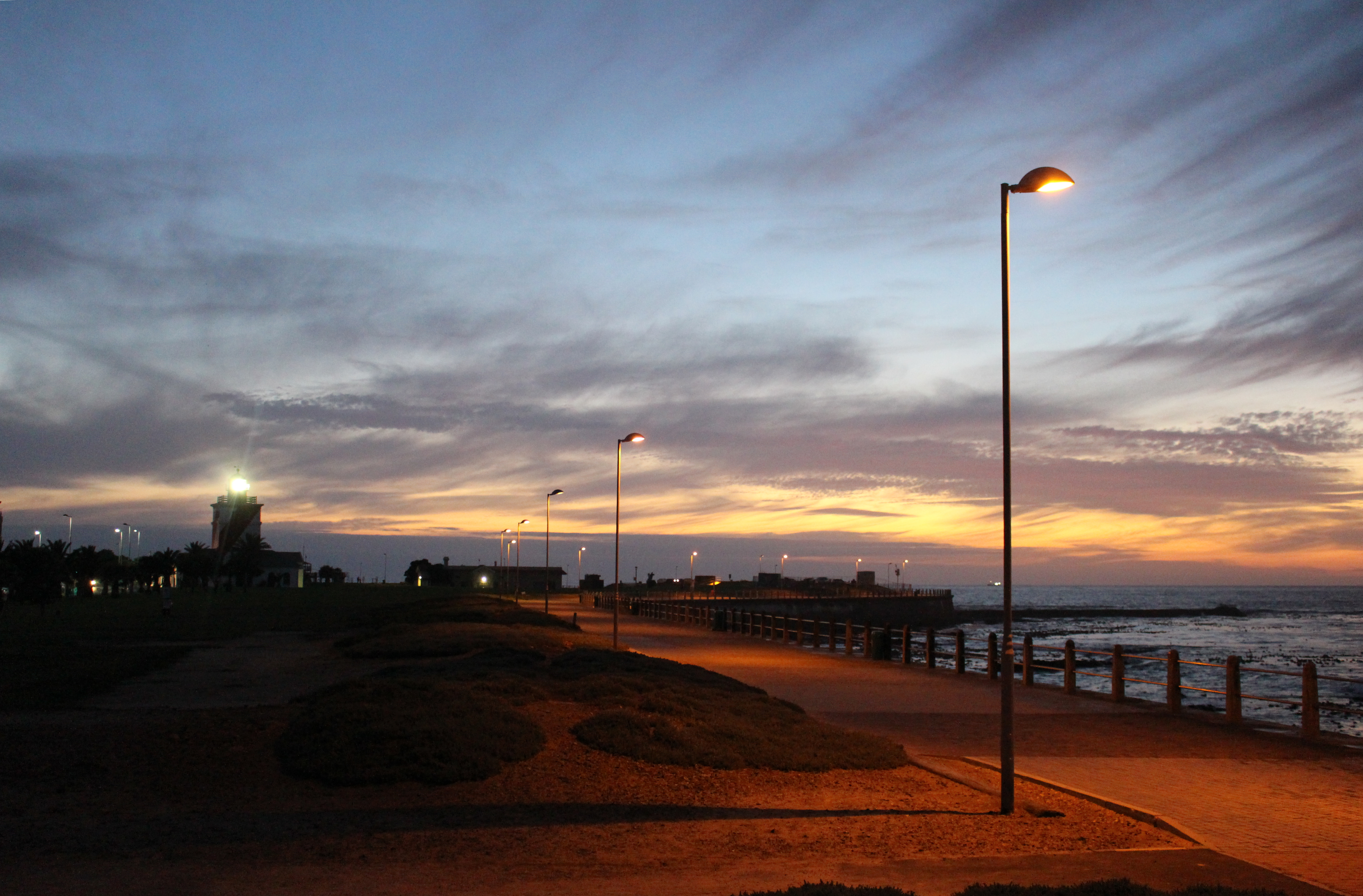
The Green Point Lighthouse at Sunset.

The Green Point Lighthouse, Cape Town is an operational lighthouse on the South African coast. First lit on 12 April 1824, it is located on Mouille Point. The lighthouse was the first solid lighthouse structure on the South African coast and the oldest operational lighthouse in South Africa. The lighthouse was commissioned by acting Governor of the Cape Colony Sir Rufane Shaw Donkin and designed by German architect Herman Shutte. Building commenced in 1821 and was completed in 1823. The lighthouse started operating in 1824. The lighthouse cost approximately £6,420 pounds sterling to build. When the lighthouse was first lit, it burned Argand lamps fueled by sperm whale oil. The light from these lanterns could be seen for 6 nautical miles (11 km; 6.9 mi). The lighthouse was expanded to its present height in 1865. In 1922, the range of the light house was extended to 22 nautical miles when 3rd order dioptric flashing lights were installed. Its present characteristic is a white light flashing every 10 seconds. In 1926, a foghorn was installed in the lighthouse despite a letter of complaint sent to the Mayor of Cape Town in 1923 by Green Point residents. Local Residents call the Green Point Lighthouse "Moaning Minnie".

== History ==
The lighthouse was designed by Herman Shutte, who arrived in the Cape in 1790. Records state that his profession at the time of his arrival was a sculptor. The building was commissioned in 1820 by Sir Rufane Shaw Donkin, who was the acting Commissioner of the Cape at the time. The building of the lighthouse took 3 years as the official governor of the Cape, Lord Charles Somerset had not been consulted and he halted the project. The lighthouse was expanded to its current state in 1865 and certified a Provincial heritage site on 12 January 1973.

=== Senior lightkeepers ===
from	until	years	name
1823			John Fell
1840-07-01	1844	~4	W Daniels
1845-07-21	1859	~14	G Murray
1860-01-23	1878-05-21	18	J Hopson
~1885			H Franks
1888			J White
1889	1894-04-05	~5	N Johnson
1895	1901	~6	T Steele
1901-09-22			W S West
~1916	1924-03-31	~8	R W Holmes
1924-04-15			G W Ratcliffe
~1928			E D Bayes
~1939	1942-03-07	~3	T F Addison
1942			T H Browning
1942	1951-08-11	~9	A W Edwards
1948-10-17	1951-12-18	3	J G Roth
1951-12-07	1955-06-24	3	W G R Hayward
1955-07-01	1959-12-12	4	T L C Addison
1960-01-27	1964-01-26	3	J P Rossouw
1964-01-28	1968-06-26	4	D M Stewart
1968-06-25	1971-12-31	3	A W Barratt
1972-01-10	1978-04-30	6	L W Vallance
1978-05	1980-11-07	2	J H E Laubscher
1980-12	1985-03-01	4	P S Theron
1985-02-18	1990-11-13	5	R M Smith

1988-12-08	1991-12-13	3	E.P Crafford

== Accidents ==
The rotating beam of the lighthouse was stopped and focused on the wreck of the S.A. Seafearer in order to provide light for the rescue operation when the ship ran aground on 1 July 1966.

== Sightseeing ==
The lighthouse is open to the public for an entrance fee. The lighthouse is part of various sightseeing tours in Cape Town.

== See also ==
- List of lighthouses in South Africa
