= Paternoster, South Africa =

Paternoster
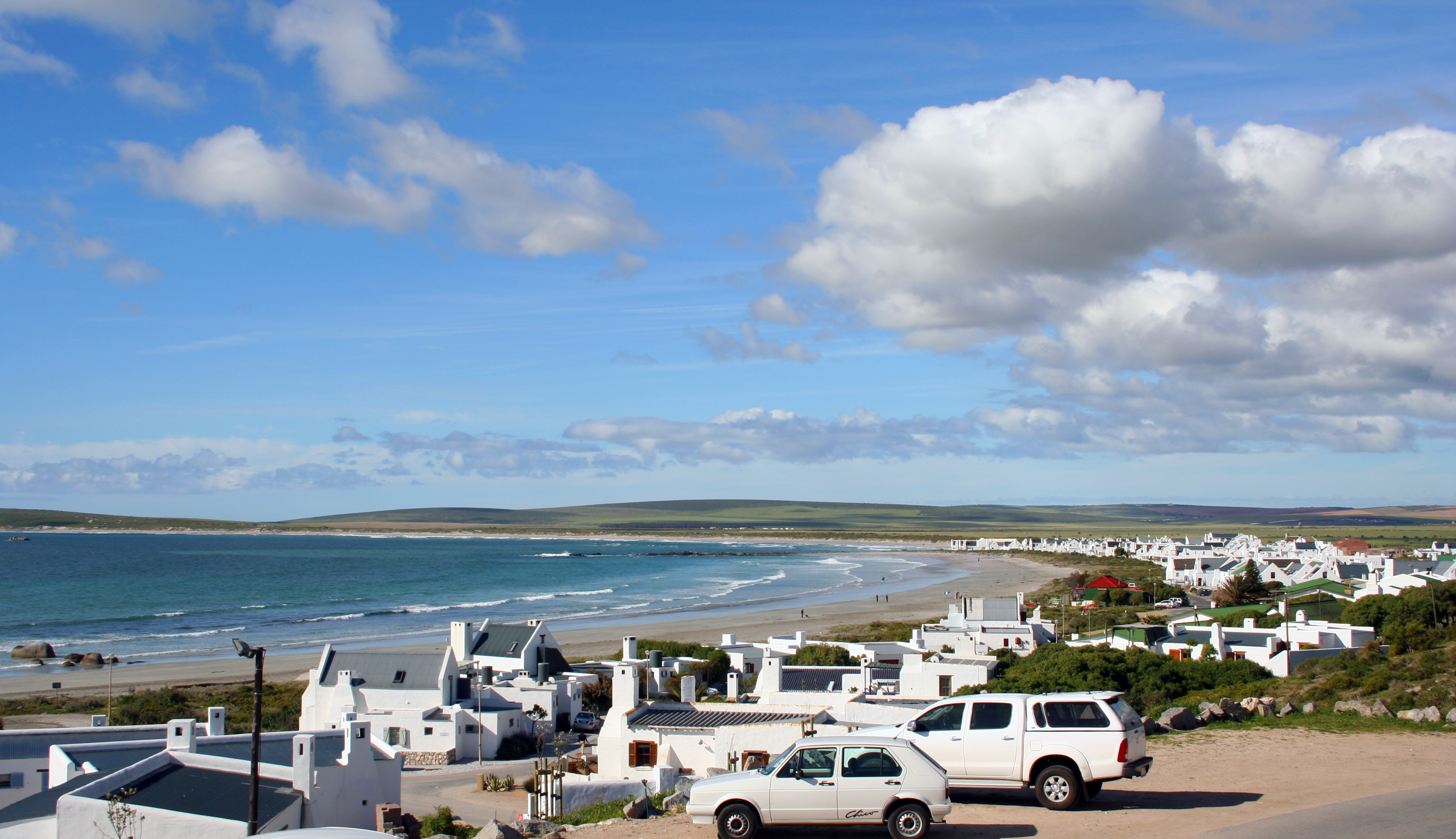
- The fisherman's village of Paternoster

- Location within Western Cape Location within South Africa
- Coordinates: 32°49′S 17°53′E
- Country: South Africa
- Province: Western Cape
- District: West Coast
- Municipality: Saldanha Bay

Area
  - Total: 2.49 km^{2} (0.96 sq mi)

Population (2011)
  - Total: 1,971
  - Density: 792/km^{2} (2,050/sq mi)

Racial makeup (2011)
  - Black African: 16.0%
  - Coloured: 71.5%
  - Indian/Asian: 0.3%
  - White: 11.6%
  - Other: 0.6%

First languages (2011)
  - Afrikaans: 82.6%
  - Xhosa: 9.1%
  - English: 5.7%
  - Sign language: 1.0%
  - Other: 1.5%
- Time zone: UTC+2 (SAST)
- Postal code (street): 7381
- PO box: —
- Area code: 022

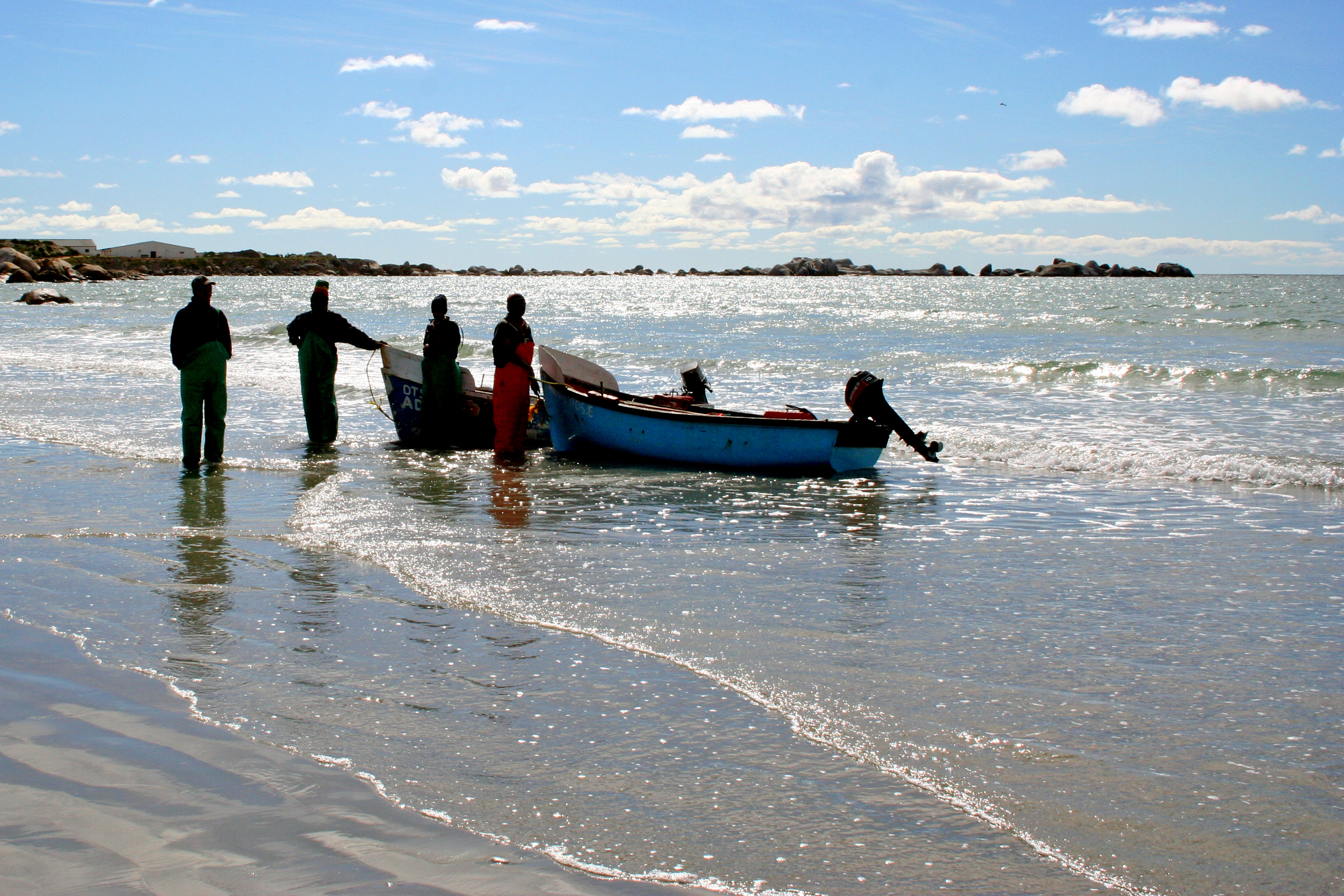
Fisherman selling his catch of the day at the beach of Paternoster

Paternoster (pronounced /ˌpɑːtɜːrˈnɒstɜːr/) is one of the oldest fishing villages on the West Coast of South Africa. It is situated 15 km north-west of Vredenburg and 145 km north of Cape Town, at Cape Columbine between Saldanha Bay and St Helena Bay. The town covers an area of 194.8 hectares (481 acres) and has approximately 1880 inhabitants.

The origin of the name remains unknown. Many people believe that the name, which means ‘Our Father’ in Latin, refers to prayers said by Catholic Portuguese seamen when they became shipwrecked. It appears as St. Martins Paternoster on an old map of Pieter Mortier, so the name may be derived from Paternoster Row in the City of London, which is adjacent to St. Martin's Court. Other people believe it refers to the beads that the Khoi tribe wore that were called Paternosters.

== Economy and tourism ==
Paternoster is a tourist destination and is known for lobster and the white-washed fishermen's cottages. The coastline consists of jagged cliffs, white boulders and beaches stretch along the West Coast of South Africa. The town boast many hotels and guest houses. They cater for couples to families, from luxury to self catering accommodation. Paternoster has many top restaurants serving the best cuisine and also has one of the world's best restaurants called Wolfgat.

The area is a pillar in the South African commercial fishing industry. The town itself has a lobster factory and a newly erected Kabeljou farm, whilst the local people catch and sell herring, or draw mussels from the rocks. In the greater area are several more commercial activities, including deep sea fishing, snoek catching, abalone farming, oyster farming, canning of pilchards and mussel farming. The oyster farm in the lagoon of the neighbouring town of Langebaan is currently the largest in South Africa. The West Coast rock lobster Jasus lalandii was enjoyed by the first Portuguese navigators. By 1902 a full-blown lobster industry was in operation, canning and exporting lobster to France in particular. The West Coast lobster industry generates millions each year and employs large numbers of the local people.

In the 1930s the first Redro factory was erected in Paternoster. Redro fish paste was developed by the Stephan family in an effort to compete with the already popular Peck's Anchovette of Britain. It flew off the shelves when first released and enjoyed nearly three decades of uncompromising sole monopoly in the savoury spread market and is now owned by Pioneer Food Group.

The Cape Bokkoms is been known for being a cheap and more practical source of protein. The unique method of preparing and drying fish has grown with leaps and bounds, often for export, in response to the growing demand for the product from South Africa.

== Climate ==
The climate is mostly known for its infrequent rainfall, dry countryside and high offshore winds. The area receives most of its rainfall during winter and has a Mediterranean climate. The climate supports the growth of the wild flowers that the West Coast is known for.

== Activities in the area ==
- The area has an array of interesting sea life and wildlife to observe. Activities include whale, dolphin, seal and penguin watching as well as bird watching with over 225 bird species in the area.
- Sporting activities range from kayaking, kitesurfing, snorkelling, scuba diving, kite flying, hiking, and swimming in the cold West Coast water.
- During spring the area is transformed into a floral paradise, with wild flowers growing everywhere forming the South-Western fringe of the famous flower carpets of Namaqualand.
- Visitors can pay a visit to the Cape Columbine nature reserve. The reserve covers an area of 263 hectare along the rocky stretch of coastline. The bay, which is part of the reserve, has many picnic spots and braai facilities.
- Cape Columbine light house is the last manually controlled lighthouse in South Africa. The lighthouse was built in 1936 on Castle Rock. The light cast a beam which is visible from about 50 km and is usually the first South African lighthouse seen by ships coming from Europe.
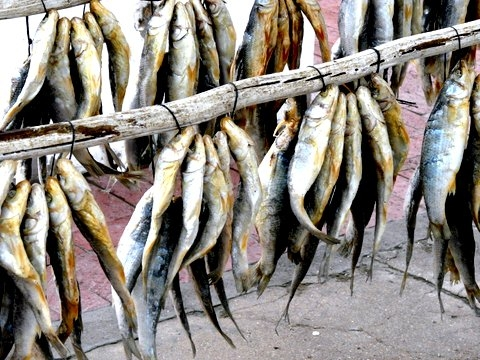
Bokkoms - whole, salted and dried mullet

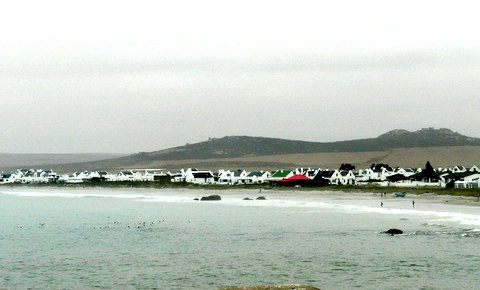
Paternoster Bay

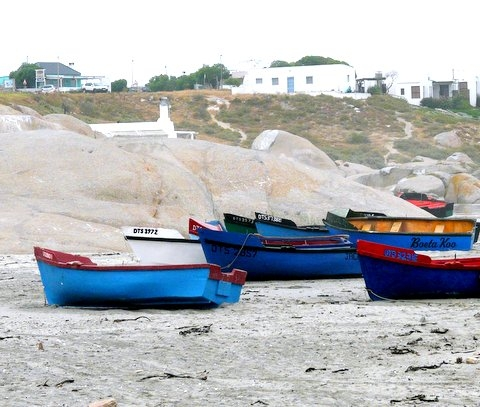
Fisherman's boats

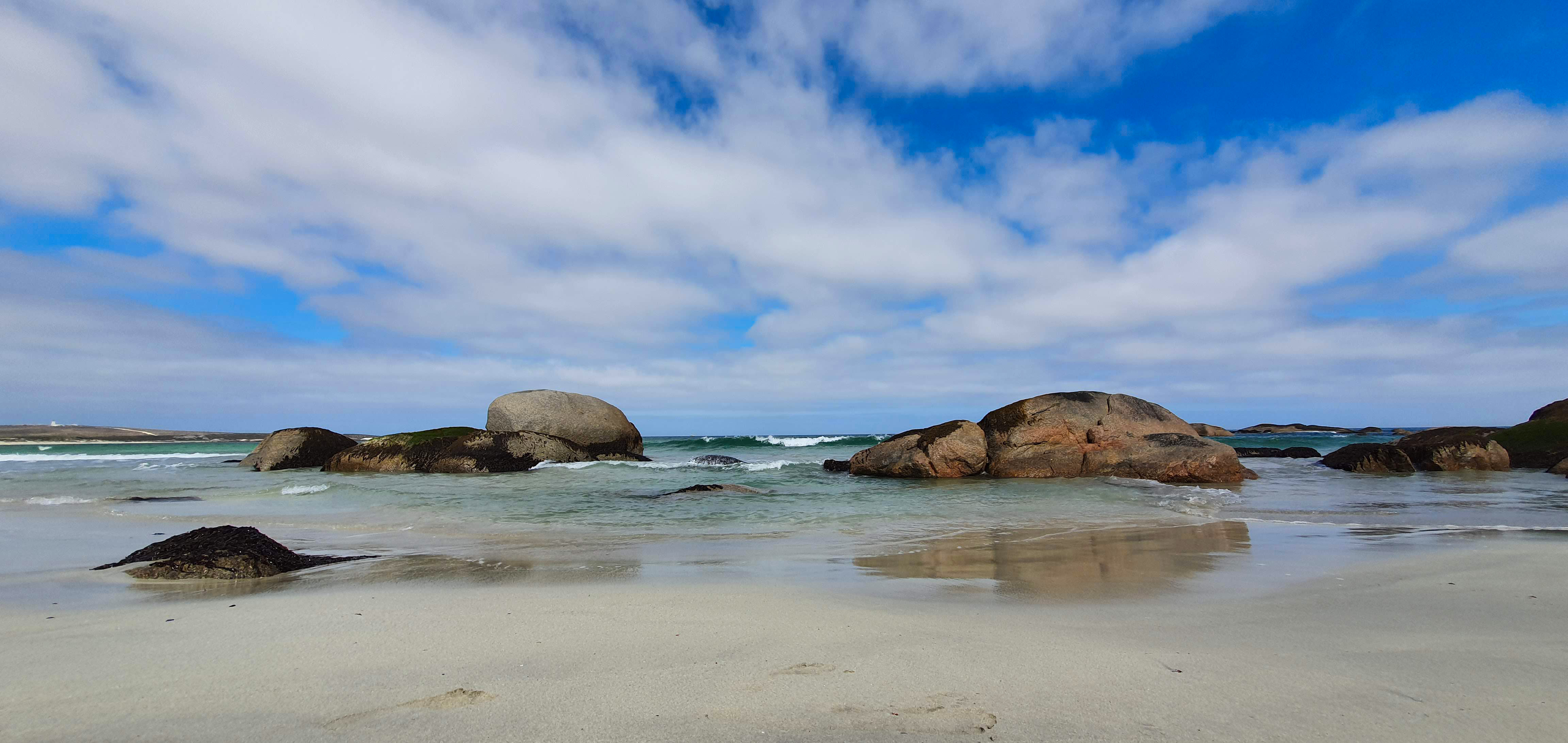
The beach in Paternoster
