= Agulhas =

Agulhas (needles in the Portuguese language — [aˈɡuʎɐs] or [aˈɡuʎɐʃ]) may refer to:

- Cape Agulhas, the southernmost point of Africa
- L'Agulhas, a town near the Cape
- Cape Agulhas Lighthouse, located at the Cape
- Cape Agulhas Local Municipality, the municipality governing the area around Bredasdorp, including the Cape
- Agulhas National Park, a national park protecting areas around Cape Agulhas
- The Agulhas Bank, an area of ocean south of the Cape
- The Agulhas Current, an ocean current off the east coast of South Africa
- South African research ships: :
  - S. A. Agulhas
  - S. A. Agulhas II
