= Strandveld =

Plain in South Africa

Coordinates: 34.483°S 19.366°E

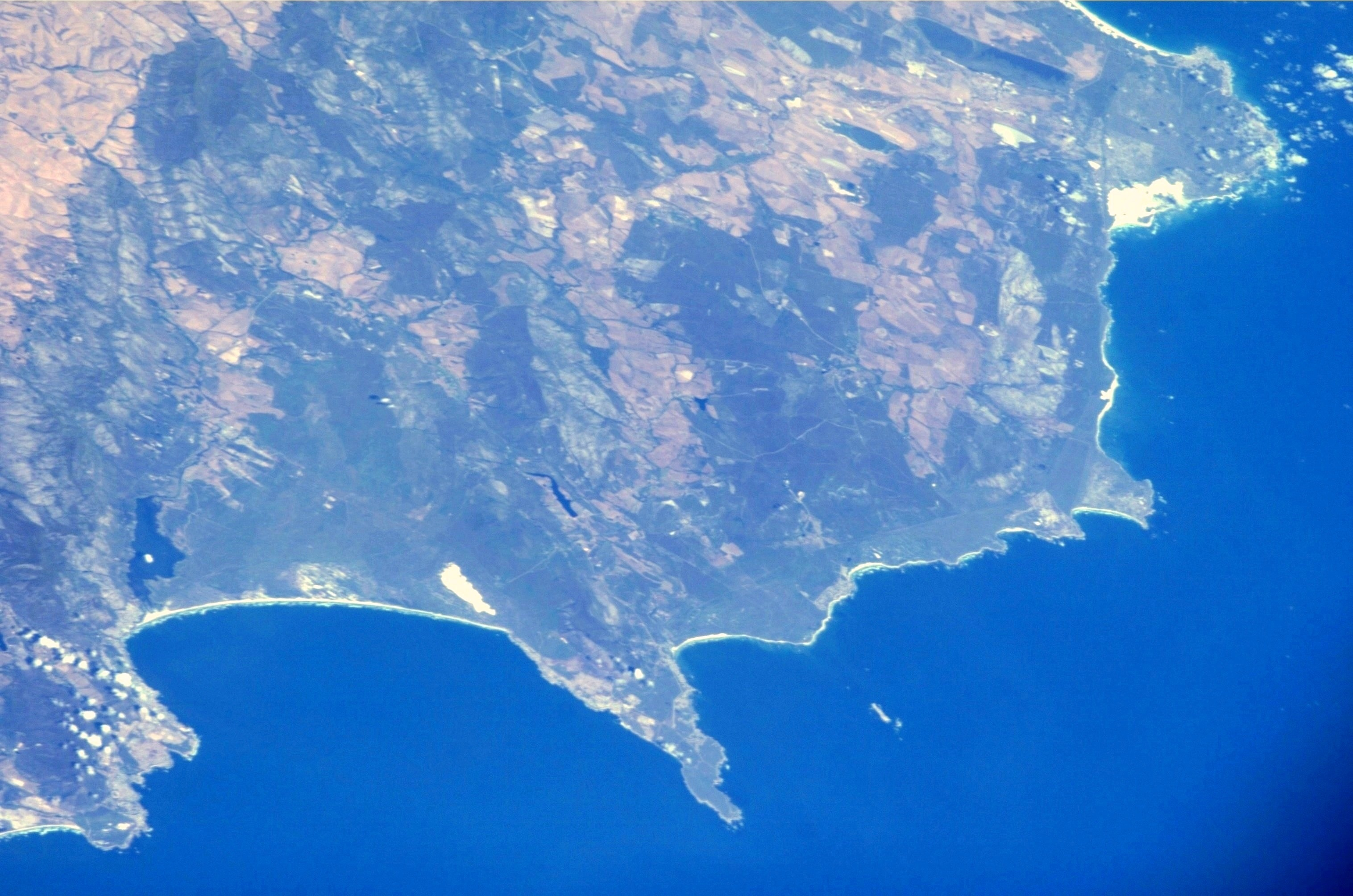
In this view from the ISS the Strandveld and Rooi-strandveld (i.e. red strandveld) are visible on either side of Danger Point (the prominent peninsula). L'Agulhas is to the far right.

Strandveld is a coastal region of the Western Cape province of South Africa. The region is mostly shrublands.

It comprises the towns and villages of Stanford, Gansbaai, Uilenkraalsmond, Franskraal, De Kelders, Baardskeerdersbos and Wolvengat. Elim, Napier and Bredasdorp form the northern border towards L'Agulhas. Soetendalsvlei is the largest lake in the region. Agulhas National Park conserves a section of the region's coastal ecosystem.
