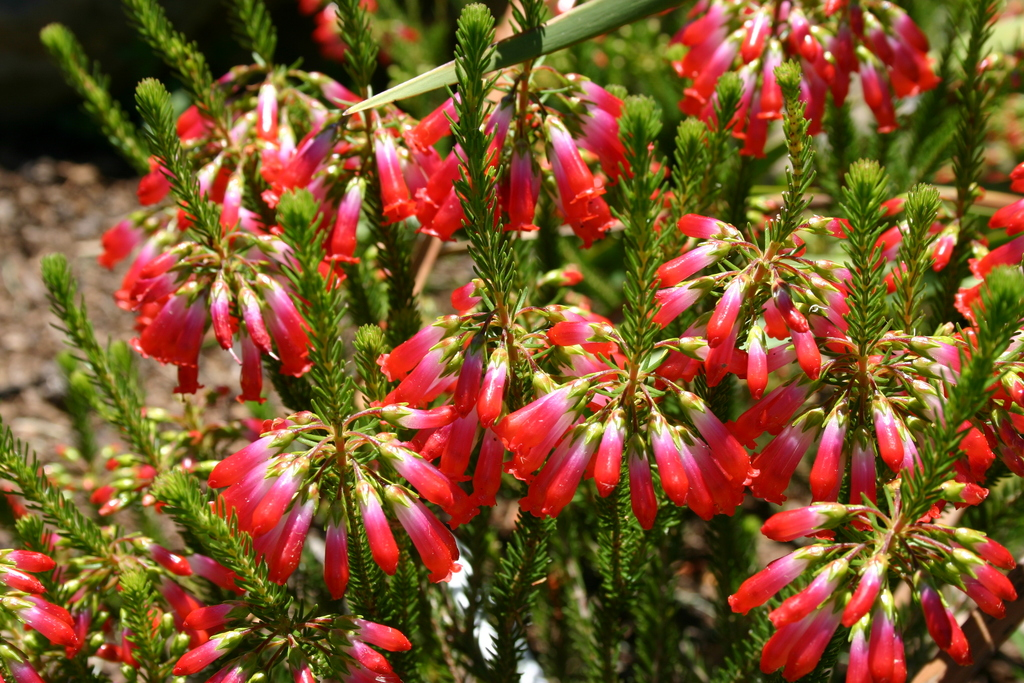

Scientific classification
- Kingdom: Plantae
- Clade: Tracheophytes
- Clade: Angiosperms
- Clade: Eudicots
- Clade: Asterids
- Order: Ericales
- Family: Ericaceae
- Genus: Erica
- Species: E. regia

Binomial name
- Erica regia Bartl. (1832)

Synonyms
- Ericoides regium (Bartl.) Kuntze

= Erica regia =

Species of flowering plant

Erica regia, the Elim heath, is a flowering shrub that belongs to the genus Erica and forms part of the fynbos. The species is endemic to the Western Cape and occurs from Elim to Viljoenshof. The shrub grows up to 70 cm high. The shrub flowers throughout the year with the peak from August to October. The flowers are tubular and red or white or a combination of the two colors. Seeds are formed in caps that are released after two months.
