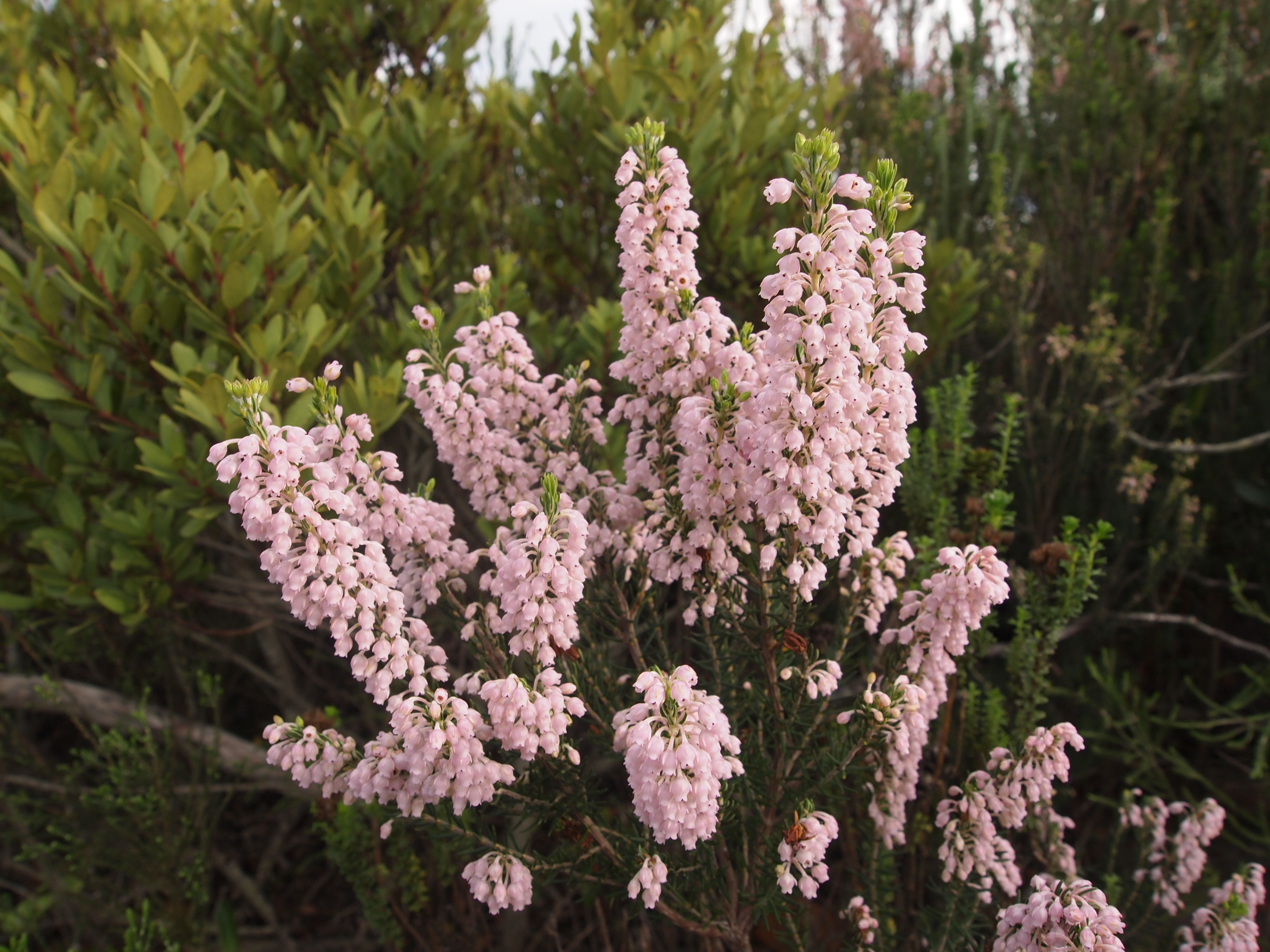

Scientific classification
- Kingdom: Plantae
- Clade: Tracheophytes
- Clade: Angiosperms
- Clade: Eudicots
- Clade: Asterids
- Order: Ericales
- Family: Ericaceae
- Genus: Erica
- Species: E. filipendula

Binomial name
- Erica filipendula Benth., (1839)

Synonyms
- Ericoides filipendulum (Benth.) Kuntze

= Erica filipendula =

Species of flowering plant

Erica filipendula is a plant belonging to the genus Erica and forming part of the fynbos. The species is endemic to the Western Cape where it occurs on the southern part of the Agulhas Plain. The plant has lost some of its habitat due to agricultural activities and invasive plants, especially in the Viljoenshof area. This problem has stabilized and many of the plants are in the protected area of the Waterford Bosluis Private Nature Reserve.
