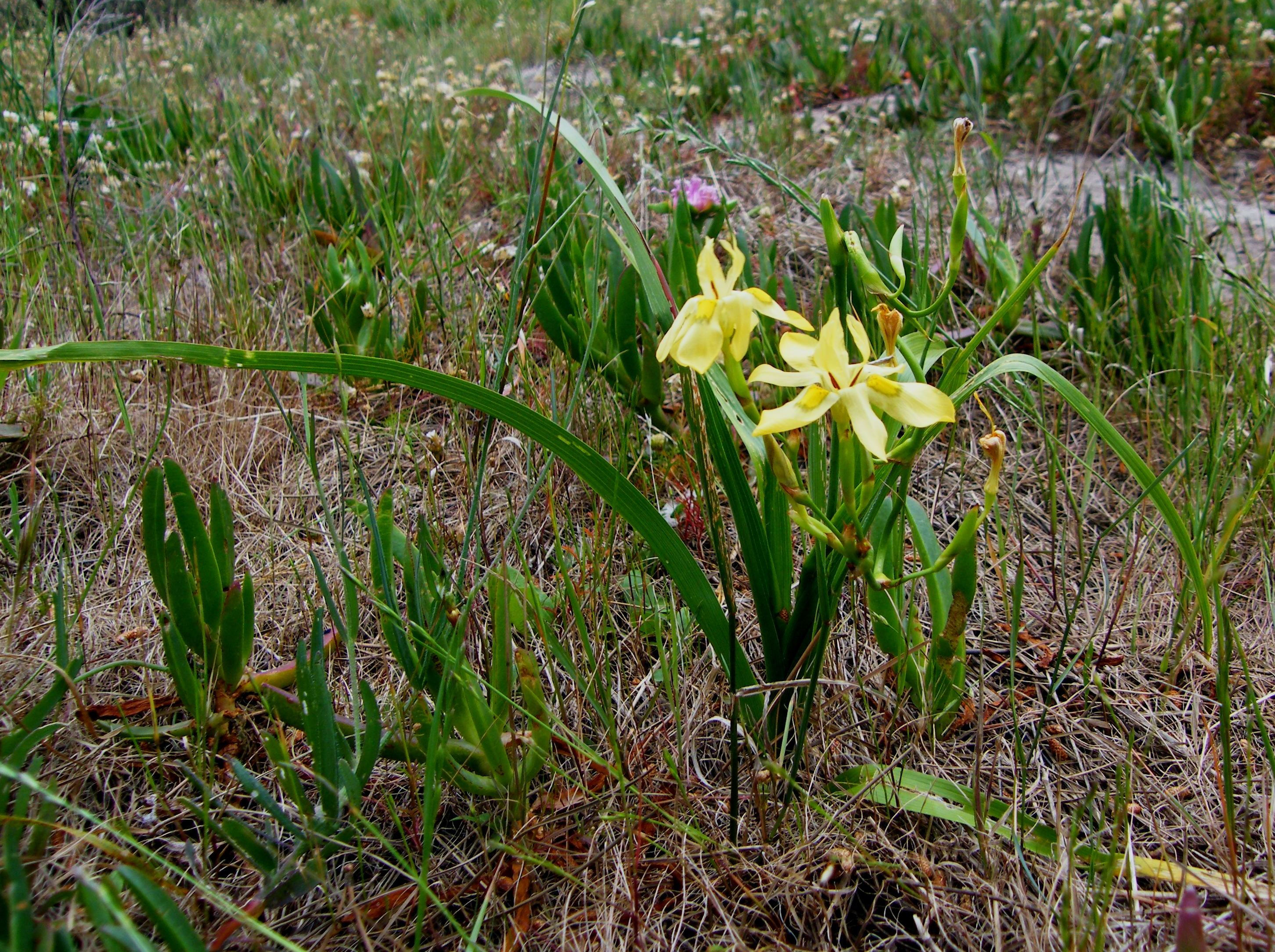

Scientific classification
- Kingdom: Plantae
- Clade: Tracheophytes
- Clade: Angiosperms
- Clade: Monocots
- Order: Asparagales
- Family: Iridaceae
- Genus: Moraea
- Species: M. papilionacea

Binomial name
- Moraea papilionacea (L.f.) Ker Gawl.

Synonyms
- Iris hirsuta Licht. ex Roem. & Schult.; Iris papilionacea L.f.; Moraea hirsuta (Licht. ex Roem. & Schult.) Ker Gawl.; Moraea pilosa J.C.Wendl.; Vieusseuxia intermedia Eckl.; Vieusseuxia nervosa Eckl.; Xiphion papilionaceum (L.f.) Schrank

= Moraea papilionacea =

Species of flowering plant

Moraea papilionacea, commonly called the butterfly uintjie, butterfly tulip, or hairy iris, is a plant and geophyte belonging to the genus Moraea and is part of the fynbos. The species is endemic to the Western Cape and occurs from the Cederberg to Bredasdorp. The plant grows to a height of 10-20 cm and flowers from August to October, the flowers are yellow or salmon-orange in colour.
