= Suiderstrand =

- Location within Western Cape Location within South Africa
- Coordinates: 34°48′54″S 19°57′29″E
- Country: South Africa
- Province: Western Cape
- District: Overberg
- Municipality: Cape Agulhas

Area
  - Total: 1.38 km^{2} (0.53 sq mi)

Population (2011)
  - Total: 44
  - Density: 32/km^{2} (83/sq mi)

Racial makeup (2011)
  - Black African: 6.8%
  - White: 93.2%

First languages (2011)
  - Afrikaans: 88.6%
  - English: 11.4%
- Time zone: UTC+2 (SAST)

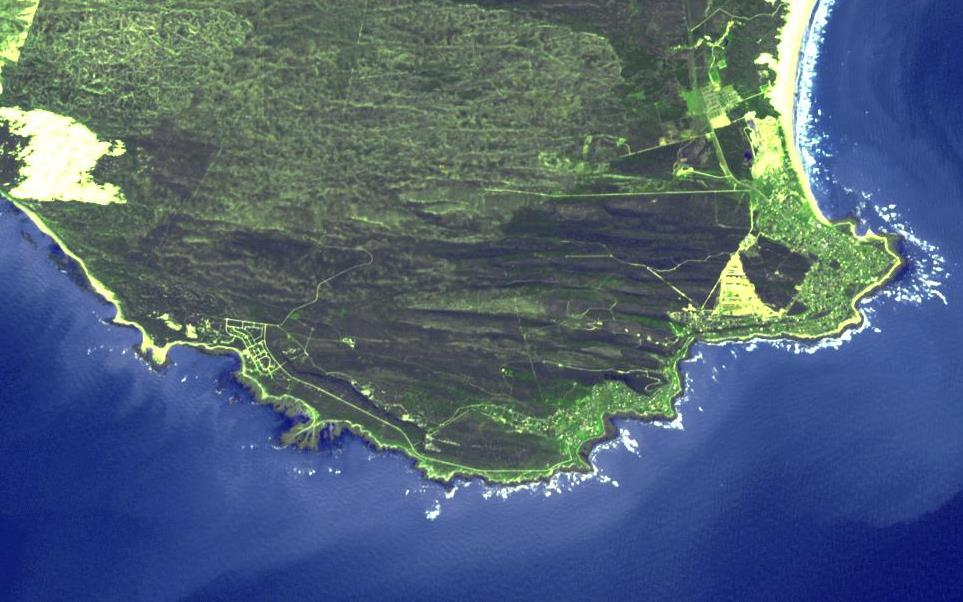
Suiderstrand, L'Agulhas and Struisbaai at Cape Agulhas, South Africa

Suiderstrand (Afrikaans for "southern beach") is a settlement in Overberg District Municipality in the Western Cape province of South Africa.

Suiderstrand is surrounded by the Agulhas National Park, home to vast diversity of mammals, reptiles, birds, insects and world-famous endemic fynbos.

Pristine beaches, interesting rockpools, a marine lagoon, pebbly bays, a historic beach home and archaeological fish traps, are all visual treats that await the coastline hiker of casual walker. Over the past few years avifauna has flourished in this area. Numbers of rare coastal birds, such as the African black oystercatcher, have after many years of near extinction now increased in numbers. It has since been removed as critically threatened from the Red Data List.
