= Erica globulifera =

Scientific classification
- Kingdom: Plantae
- Clade: Tracheophytes
- Clade: Angiosperms
- Clade: Eudicots
- Clade: Asterids
- Order: Ericales
- Family: Ericaceae
- Genus: Erica
- Species: E. globulifera

Binomial name
- Erica globulifera Dulfer

Species of flowering plant

Erica globulifera is a plant belonging to the genus Erica and forming part of the fynbos. The species' scientific name was first published by Dulfer in 1964. The species is endemic to the Western Cape and occurs in the Bredasdorp area.
