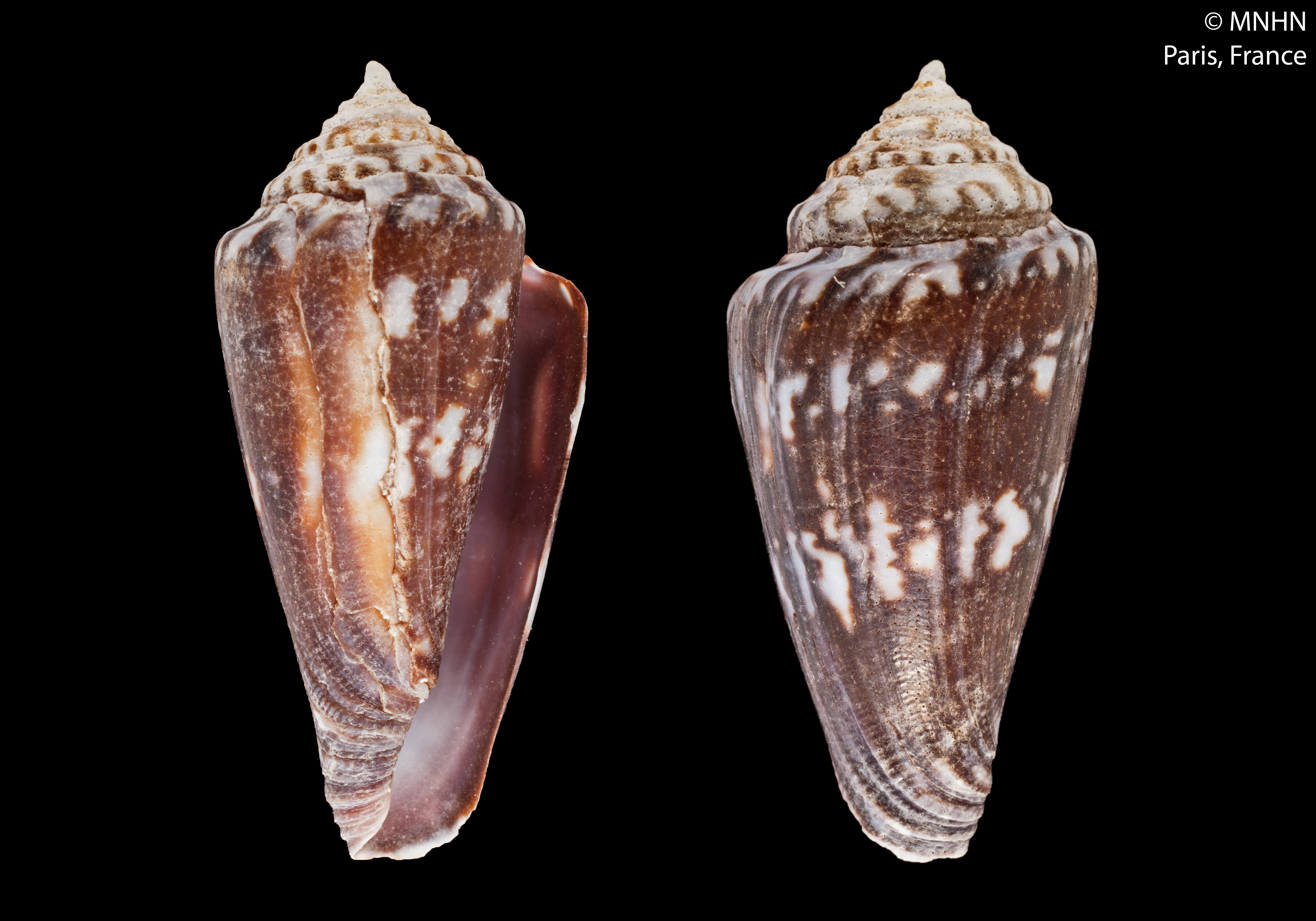
- Shell of Conus norpothi (holotype at MNHN, Paris)

Scientific classification
- Kingdom: Animalia
- Phylum: Mollusca
- Class: Gastropoda
- Subclass: Caenogastropoda
- Order: Neogastropoda
- Superfamily: Conoidea
- Family: Conidae
- Genus: Conus
- Species: C. norpothi

Binomial name
- Conus norpothi Lorenz, 2015

Synonyms
- Conus (Floraconus) norpothi Lorenz, 2015; Conus (Sciteconus) algoensis norpothi Lorenz, 2015; Conus algoensis norpothi Lorenz, 2015 (original rank); Floraconus norpothi (Lorenz, 2015)

= Conus norpothi =

Species of gastropod

Conus norpothi is a species of sea snail, a marine gastropod mollusk, in the family Conidae, the cone snails and their allies.

== Description ==
The length of the shell attains 35.3 mm.

- Taxonomy: Conus algoensis norpothi is classified as a subspecies of the Conus algoensis species.
- Family: The species belongs to the family Conidae, which includes cone snails and their allies.
- Predatory and venomous: Like all species within the genus Conus, these snails are predatory and venomous.
- Alternative representation: It can also be represented as Conus (Sciteconus) algoensis norpothi Lorenz, 2015.
- Genus Conus: The genus Conus is a group of predatory sea snails, or cone snails, marine gastropod mollusks in the family Conidae.

== Distribution ==
This marine species occurs off Cape Agulhas, South Africa.
