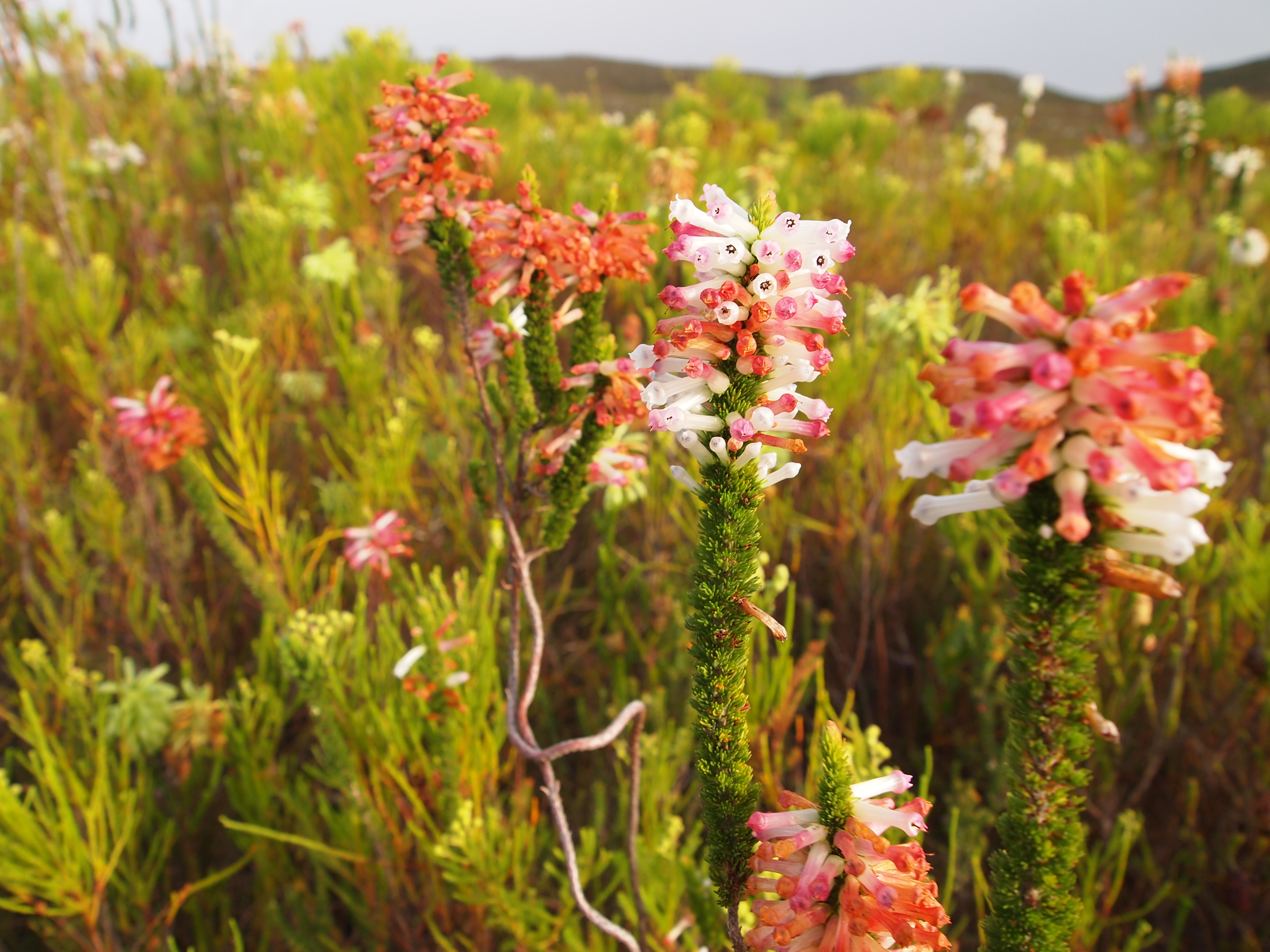

Scientific classification
- Kingdom: Plantae
- Clade: Tracheophytes
- Clade: Angiosperms
- Clade: Eudicots
- Clade: Asterids
- Order: Ericales
- Family: Ericaceae
- Genus: Erica
- Species: E. colorans

Binomial name
- Erica colorans Andrews, (1814)

Synonyms
- Ericoides colorans (Andrews) Kuntze; Syringodea colorans G.Don

= Erica colorans =

Species of plant

Erica colorans is a plant belonging to the genus Erica and forming part of the fynbos. The species is endemic to the Western Cape and occurs from Stanford to Elim. The plant's habitat is slowly deteriorating and invasive plants are also a threat.
