= Moraea loubseri =

Scientific classification
- Kingdom: Plantae
- Clade: Tracheophytes
- Clade: Angiosperms
- Clade: Monocots
- Order: Asparagales
- Family: Iridaceae
- Genus: Moraea
- Species: M. loubseri

Binomial name
- Moraea loubseri Goldblatt

Species of flowering plant

Moraea loubseri, commonly known as the spider flappie or spinnekopflappie, is a plant and geophyte belonging to the genus Moraea and is part of the Saldanha strandveld. The species is endemic to the Western Cape and occurs at Langebaan. The plant was described in 1977 after it was discovered on a granite hill. Since then, it has lost much of its habitat due to quarrying. In 1995, only ten plants remained and between 2004 and 2008, no plants could be found and it was feared that the plant was extinct. In September 2011, two plants were discovered in flower.
