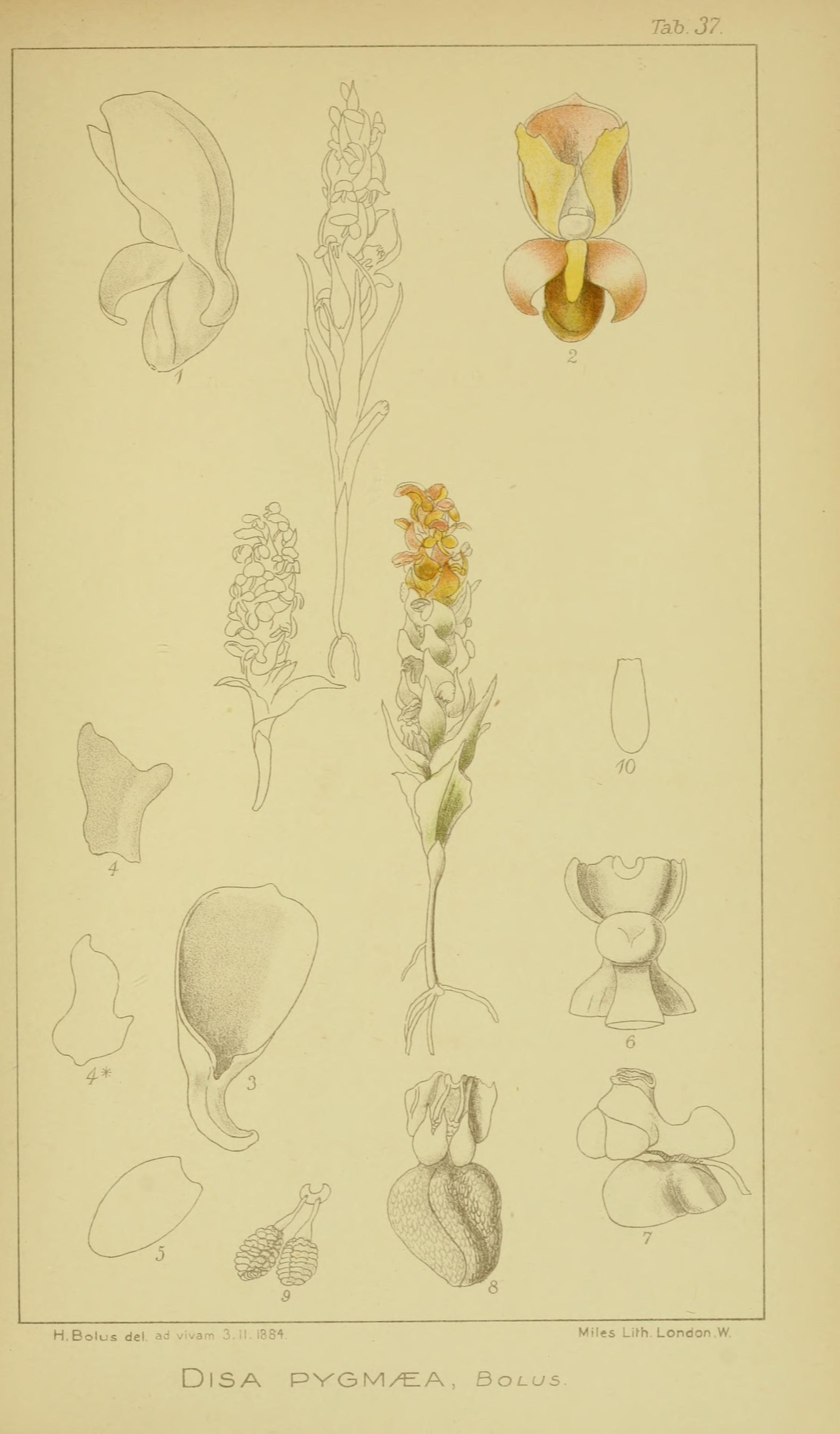

Scientific classification
- Kingdom: Plantae
- Clade: Tracheophytes
- Clade: Angiosperms
- Clade: Monocots
- Order: Asparagales
- Family: Orchidaceae
- Subfamily: Orchidoideae
- Genus: Disa
- Species: D. pygmaea

Binomial name
- Disa pygmaea Bolus

Synonyms
- Monadenia pygmaea (Bolus) T.Durand & Schinz

= Disa pygmaea =

Species of flowering plant

Disa pygmaea is a perennial plant and geophyte belonging to the genus Disa and is part of the fynbos. The plant is endemic to the Western Cape and occurs from the Cape Peninsula to Elim and Pilaarkop. The species' numbers have declined but have now stabilized. There are seven subpopulations, some of which are in mountainous conservation areas. The plant is considered rare.
