= Erica oligantha =

Scientific classification
- Kingdom: Plantae
- Clade: Tracheophytes
- Clade: Angiosperms
- Clade: Eudicots
- Clade: Asterids
- Order: Ericales
- Family: Ericaceae
- Genus: Erica
- Species: E. oligantha

Binomial name
- Erica oligantha Guthrie & Bolus

Species of flowering plant

Erica oligantha is a plant that belongs to the genus Erica and is part of the fynbos. The species is endemic to the Western Cape. Here it occurs at two places, Van der Bijlberg and Akkedisberg between Stanford and Napier. The plant's habitat is sensitive to any external change and both populations are declining due to invasive plants.
