= Arniston, South Africa =

Village in Western Cape, South Africa

Arniston
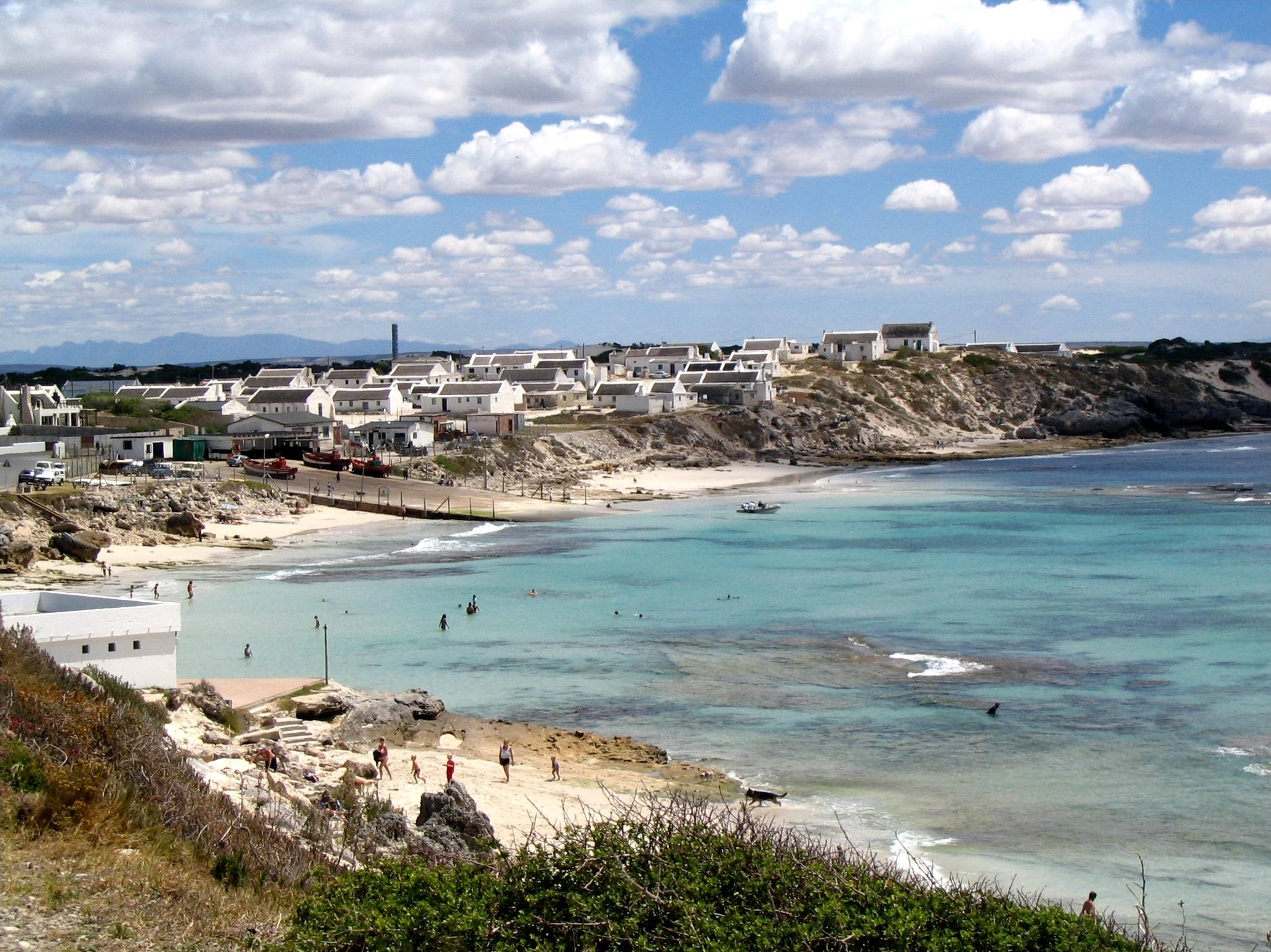
- Arniston's typical fisherman houses

- Location within Western Cape Location within South Africa
- Coordinates: 34°40′0″S 20°13′50″E
- Country: South Africa
- Province: Western Cape
- District: Overberg
- Municipality: Cape Agulhas

Area
  - Total: 3.95 km^{2} (1.53 sq mi)

Population (2011)
  - Total: 1,267
  - Density: 321/km^{2} (831/sq mi)

Racial makeup (2011)
  - Black African: 2.4%
  - Coloured: 87.9%
  - Indian/Asian: 0.2%
  - White: 9.6%

First languages (2011)
  - Afrikaans: 86.1%
  - Tswana: 5.7%
  - English: 4.8%
  - Other: 3.4%
- Time zone: UTC+2 (SAST)
- PO box: 7280

Arniston, also known as Waenhuiskrans, is a small seaside settlement on the coast of the Overberg region of South Africa, close to Cape Agulhas, the southernmost tip of Africa. Prior to the wreck of the ship Arniston, the area was known as Waenhuiskrans, an Afrikaans name meaning "wagon-house cliff", referring to a local sea cave large enough to accommodate a wagon and a span of oxen. Over time, the shipwreck's name became synonymous with the settlement and today Arniston and Waenhuiskrans are used interchangeably.

== Wreck of Arniston ==
In May 1815, the British East Indiaman Arniston was rounding the Cape in convoy while transporting wounded British soldiers from Ceylon for repatriation. The ship lacked a chronometer – an expensive instrument at the time – and consequently had to rely on other vessels in the convoy to calculate longitude.

After being separated from the convoy in heavy seas, the captain was forced to rely solely on dead reckoning to navigate. Believing incorrectly that the ship was west of the Cape of Good Hope due to poor headway, he mistook Cape Agulhas for Cape Point. Consequently, when the vessel turned north towards St Helena under the false assumption that the Cape had been rounded, it ran aground on the rocks at Waenhuiskrans. Only six of the 378 people on board survived the wrecking.

The survivors spent several days on the beach before being discovered by a farmer's son. A memorial, a replica of which can be seen today, was erected on the beach by the wife of Colonel Andrew Geils, whose four unaccompanied children were lost in the tragedy.

== Today ==
At first only a fishing community, Arniston has become a popular tourist and holiday destination and its hinterland a region for viticulture. The fishing village, characterised by its lime-washed and thatched houses, remains unspoiled and has been declared a national monument in its entirety. Fishermen still go to sea in traditional nineteenth-century style boats, although now under contract to larger commercial enterprises.

Whale watching is a popular tourist activity. The closest major town is Bredasdorp, 24 kilometres (15 mi) to the north. The Overberg Test Range is situated adjacent to the town.
