= Cape Agulhas Lighthouse =

Lighthouse in South Africa

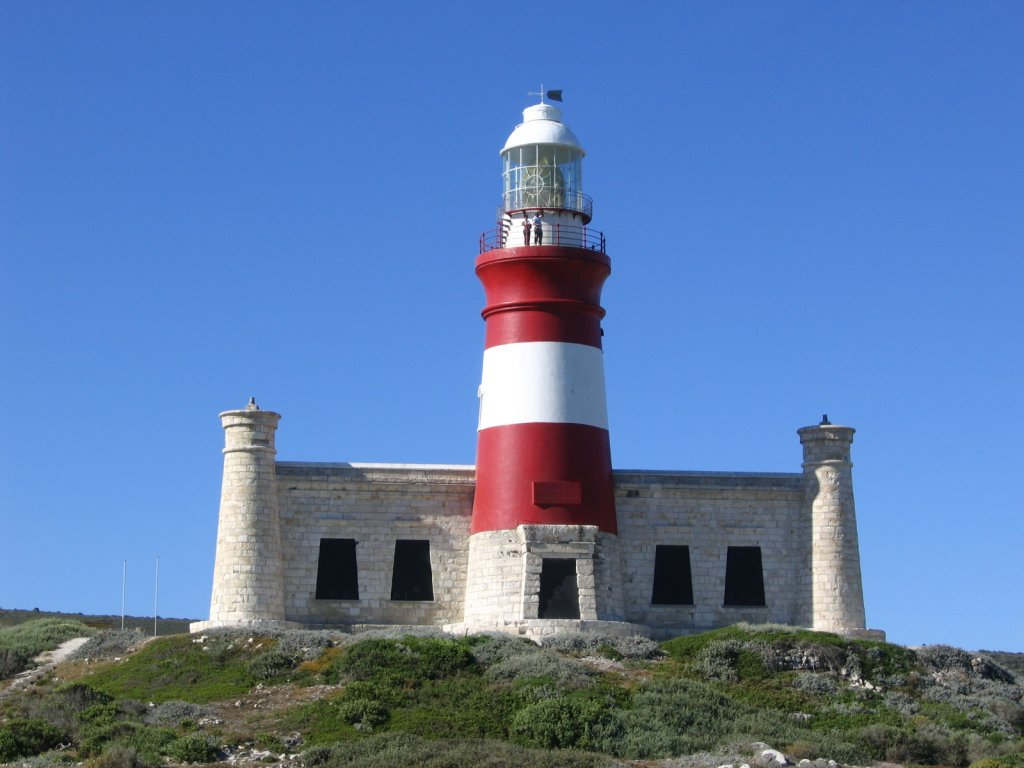
- Cape Agulhas Lighthouse
- Location: L'Agulhas, Western Cape, South Africa
- Coordinates: 34.829389°S 20.008911°E

Tower
- Constructed: 1848 (first lit 1849)
- Construction: sandstone tower
- Height: 27 m (89 ft)
- Shape: cylindrical tower with balcony and lantern rising from one-story keeper's house
- Markings: red tower with a white band, white lantern
- Power source: mains electricity
- Operator: South African National Parks
- Heritage: Historic Civil Engineering Landmark

Light
- First lit: 1 March 1849
- Deactivated: 1968–1988
- Focal height: 31 m (102 ft)
- Lens: 1st order Fresnel
- Intensity: 7,500,000 cd
- Range: 30 nmi (56 km; 35 mi)
- Characteristic: Fl W 5s

The Cape Agulhas Lighthouse is at Cape Agulhas, the southernmost tip of Africa. At 171 years old, it is the third-built lighthouse in South Africa, and the second-oldest still operating, after Green Point. It is located on the southern edge of the village of L'Agulhas, in the Agulhas National Park; the light is operated by Transnet National Ports Authority. In 2016, the American Society of Civil Engineers (ASCE) identified the lighthouse as a deserving prominent historic engineering project and International Historic Civil Engineering Landmark.

== History ==
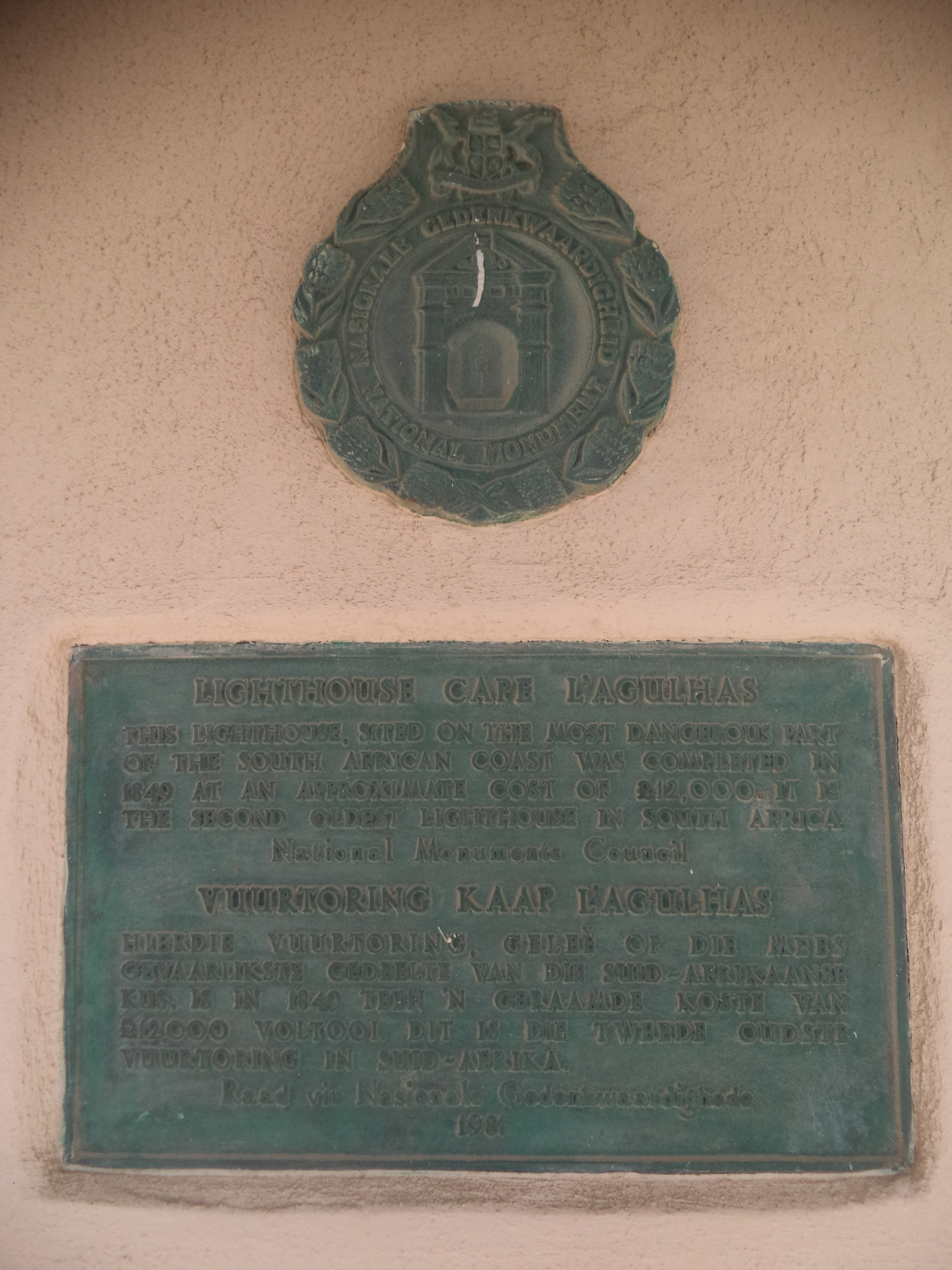
Memorial plaques are at the entrance of the Lighthouse.

A lighthouse at Cape Agulhas was suggested by Colonel Charles Collier Michell, the Surveyor-General of the Cape, in March 1837. A public meeting at Cape Town on 11 July 1840 resolved to raise funds for the construction of the lighthouse, and Michiel van Breda, the founder of Bredasdorp, offered to donate the land on which it was to be built. Apart from local contributions, funds were received from Bombay, Calcutta, Madras, Manila, St Helena and London; by June 1843 the sum raised was £1,479.3s.9d (£1,479.19).

In 1847, the government of the Cape Colony agreed to fund the construction at a cost of £15,871; building work began in April and was completed in December 1848, and the light was first lit on 1 March 1849. Originally, it was fuelled by the tail-fat of sheep, but in 1905 an oil-burning lantern was installed. In March 1910, the lens was replaced with a first-order Fresnel lens. In 1929, the oil burner was replaced by a petroleum vapour burner, which was in turn replaced in 1936 by a four-kilowatt electric lamp powered by a diesel generator.

In 1968, the lighthouse was taken out of service, and the light moved to an aluminum tower, as it was discovered that the sandstone walls were crumbling due to excessive weathering. The building was declared a national monument in 1973 and is also a Western Cape provincial heritage site. Restoration and reconstruction was performed by the Bredasdorp Shipwreck Museum and the local council, and the lighthouse was recommissioned in 1988.

In 2016, the American Society of Civil Engineers (ASCE) identified the lighthouse as a deserving prominent historic engineering project and International Historic Civil Engineering Landmark.

== Characteristics ==
The lighthouse consists of a round tower, 27 metres (89 ft) high and painted red with a white band, that is attached to the keeper's house, which now contains a museum and restaurant. The design of the building was inspired by the Pharos of Alexandria. The focal plane of the light is 31 metres (102 ft) above high water; the range of the 7.5 megacandela lantern is 30 nautical miles (56 km; 35 mi). The rotating optic gives off one white flash every five seconds.

== See also ==
- List of lighthouses in South Africa
- List of heritage sites in South Africa
- List of Historic Civil Engineering Landmarks
