= Uilenkraalsmond =

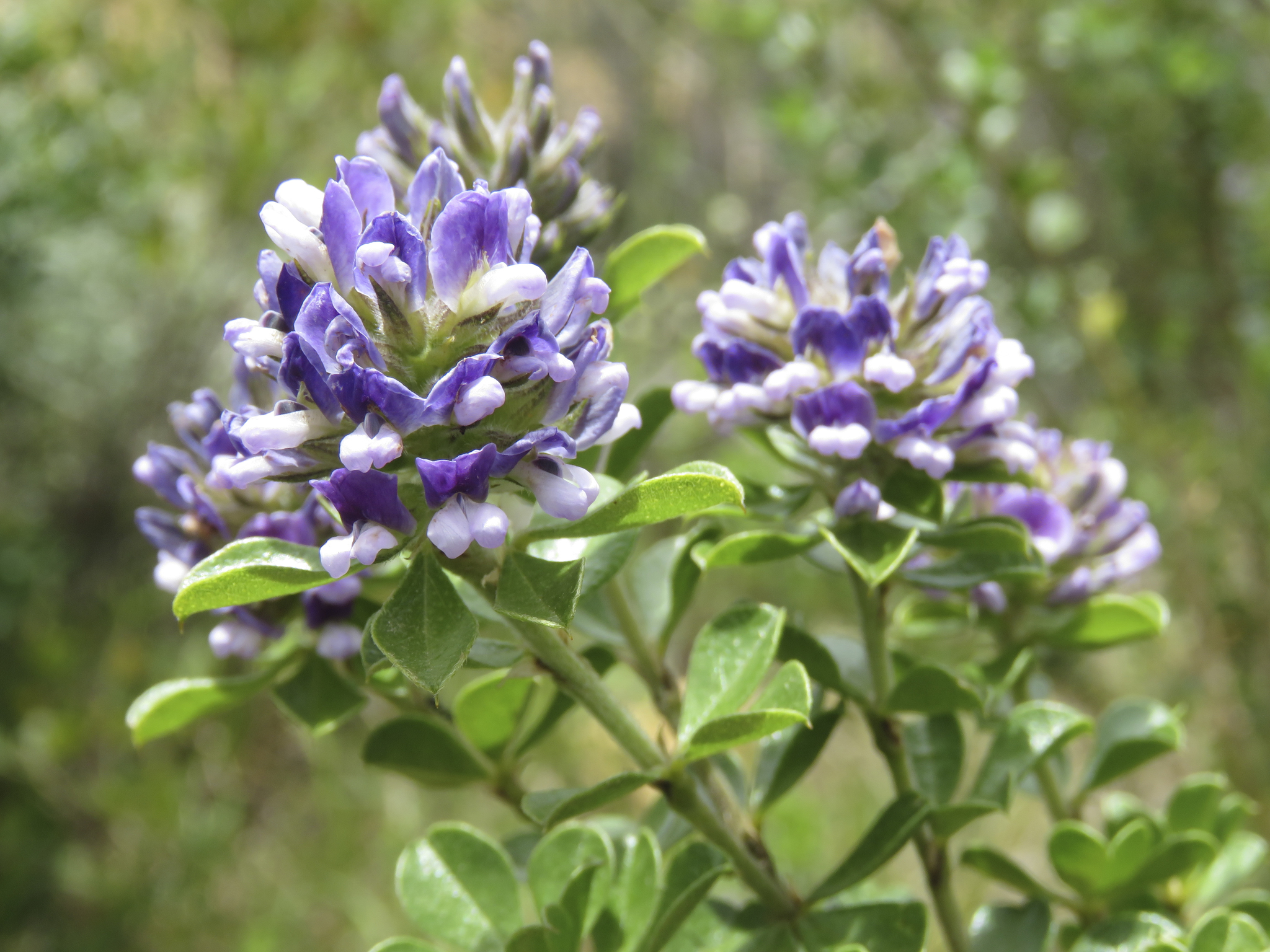
- Strand dottypea, in Uilenkraal.

- Location within Western Cape Location within South Africa
- Coordinates: 34°34′03″S 19°27′48″E
- Country: South Africa
- Province: Western Cape
- District: Overberg
- Municipality: Overstrand

Area
  - Total: 0.36 km^{2} (0.14 sq mi)

Population (2011)
  - Total: 98
  - Density: 270/km^{2} (710/sq mi)

Racial makeup (2011)
  - White African: 74.49%
  - Black African: 23.47%
  - Coloured: 2.04%

First languages (2011)
  - Afrikaans: 82.65%
  - Xhosa: 15.31%
  - English: 2.04%
- Time zone: UTC+2 (SAST)
- PO box: 172023001

Uilenkraalsmond or Uilenkraal (lit. 'Owls kraal mouth') is a populated place located in the village of Franskraalstrand, Overstrand Local Municipality of the Overberg District Municipality, in the Western Cape province of South Africa.

Located in the coastal region of Strandveld south of Gansbaai, the Uilkraal River runs through the settlement.

According to the 2011 census, Uilenkraal had a population of 98 in 50 households. According to the same census, 74.49% of the population described themselves as White, 23.47% as Black African, and 2.04% as Coloured. 82.65% of the population spoke Afrikaans as a first language, 15.31% spoke Xhosa, and 2.04% spoke English.

The settlement was first established by Pieter Swart in 1722, who was also the first resident.
