= Uilenkraals River =

River in the Western Cape, South Africa

Uilenkraals River Uilkraals River
- Location within South Africa
- Native name: Uilenkraalsrivier (Afrikaans)

Location
- Country: South Africa
- Province: Western Cape

Physical characteristics
- Source: _
- Mouth: Atlantic Ocean
  - location: Western Cape, South Africa
  - coordinates: 34°36′22″S 19°24′33″E
  - elevation: 0 m (0 ft)

Uilenkraals River (or Uilkraals River) is a river in the Western Cape province of South Africa. The river mouth is located at the Uilkraalsmond Nature Reserve in Uilenkraalsmond, near Gansbaai.

== See also ==
- List of rivers of South Africa
- List of drainage basins of South Africa
- Water Management Areas
