= Napier, South Africa =

Village in Western Cape, South Africa

Napier
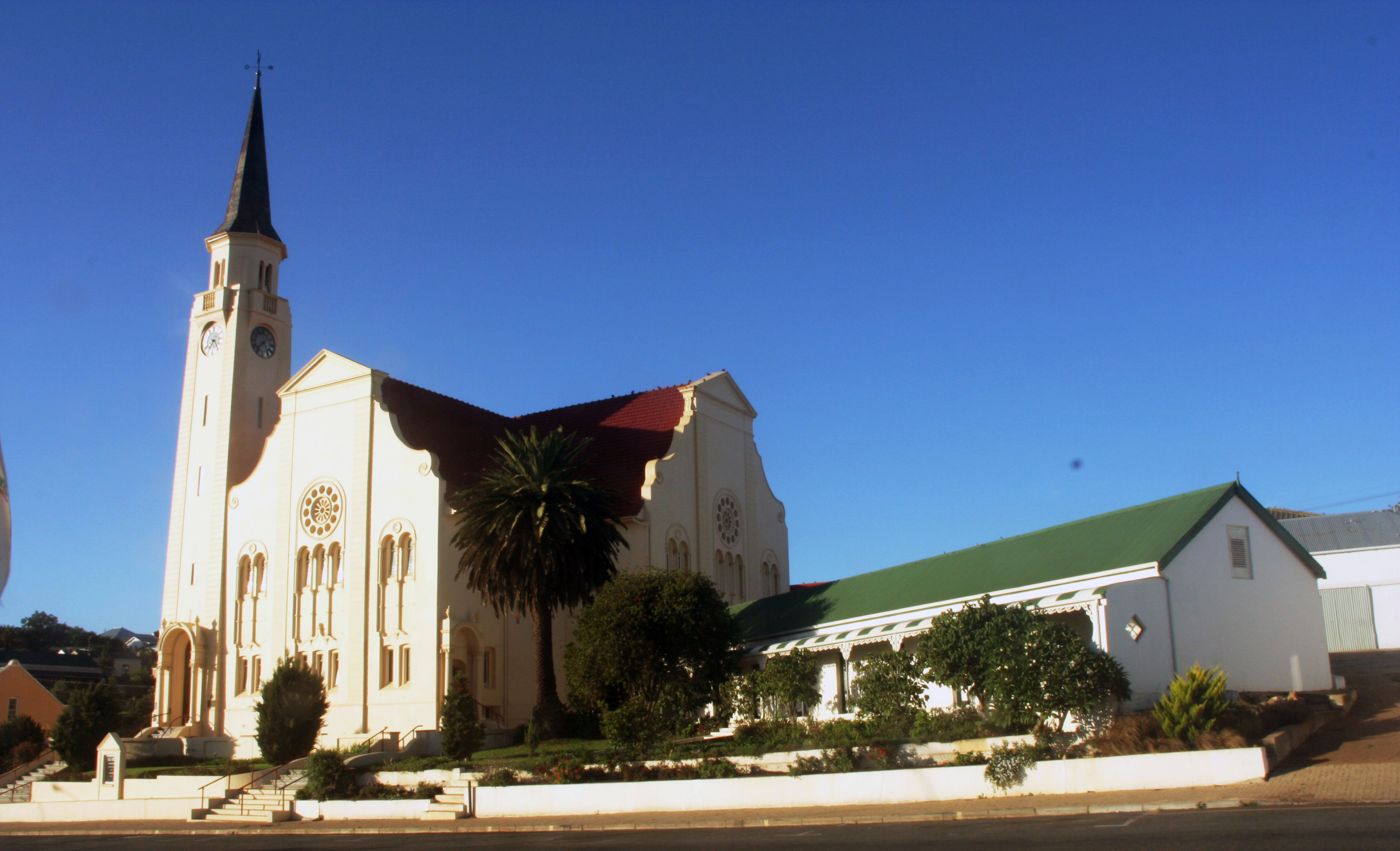
- The NG Kerk (Dutch Reformed Church) on the main street of Napier

- Location within Western Cape Location within South Africa
- Coordinates: 34°28′S 19°54′E
- Country: South Africa
- Province: Western Cape
- District: Overberg
- Municipality: Cape Agulhas
- Established: 1838

Area
  - Total: 23.04 km^{2} (8.90 sq mi)

Population (2011)
  - Total: 4,214
  - Density: 182.9/km^{2} (473.7/sq mi)

Racial makeup (2011)
  - Black African: 10.6%
  - Coloured: 66.6%
  - Indian/Asian: 0.5%
  - White: 21.8%
  - Other: 0.6%

First languages (2011)
  - Afrikaans: 80.4%
  - English: 11.0%
  - Xhosa: 5.9%
  - Other: 2.7%
- Time zone: UTC+2 (SAST)
- Postal code (street): 7270
- PO box: 7270
- Area code: 028

Napier is a village at the foot of the Soetmuisberg, between Caledon and Bredasdorp. A blend of century-old cottages and modern houses, surrounded by the rolling farmland which typifies the Overberg region of South Africa, give the village a rural atmosphere.

Napier is situated in the Cape Agulhas Region with easy access to the seaside villages of Arniston/Waenhuiskrans, Struisbaai and L´Agulhas.

== History ==
Napier was founded in 1838 through a dispute between two neighbours, Michiel van Breda and Pieter Voltelyn van der Byl, over the location of the community church.

Michiel van Breda wanted the church sited on his farm, Langefontein, while Pieter Voltelyn van der Byl wanted it built on his property, Klipdrift. Neither Van Breda nor Van der Byl would give way, so churches were built in both places, the town of Bredasdorp growing around Van Breda’s church and the town of Napier founded around Van der Byl’s church, and being named after Sir George Thomas Napier, the British governor of the Cape Province at that time.

The Feeshuis, one of the oldest buildings in the town, was used as slave quarters during 1810–1820, and then later as a wine cellar, It was restored in 1988 to celebrate the town's 150th anniversary. The Dutch Reformed Church was built in the form of a Greek cross with teak interior, unique with a beautiful pipe organ made of solid yellow copper.

The sundial was erected by Danie du Toit in 1965, who had no training in this field but gained his knowledge through meticulous observation. Time can be read from it, accurate to within 30 seconds.

== Tourism ==
Attractions include various art galleries, a giant sundial at the municipal offices, and an Ox Wagon monument (Kakebeenwa) to commemorate the Ossewa Trek of 1838. The ox wagon monument has an impression of a wagon wheel track made in concrete to commemorate the exodus of dissident Afrikaners from the Western Cape.

In the past, Napier's main craftsmen were blacksmiths, a heritage which is commemorated by annual festivals. Other annual events are the Patatfees (Sweet potato Festival), every June, and the "Voet van Afrika" (Foot of Africa) Marathon which is run in mid-September.
