= Cape Agulhas Local Municipality =

Cape Agulhas Kaap Agulhas
- Local municipality
- Seal

- Location in the Western Cape
- Coordinates: 34°30′S 20°00′E
- Country: South Africa
- Province: Western Cape
- District: Overberg
- Seat: Bredasdorp
- Wards: 6

Government
  - Type: Municipal council
  - Mayor: Raymond Ross (DA)
  - Deputy Mayor: Karin Donald (DA)

Area
  - Total: 3,467 km^{2} (1,339 sq mi)

Population (2022)
  - Total: 40,274
  - Density: 11.62/km^{2} (30.09/sq mi)

Racial makeup (2022)
  - Black African: 12.6%
  - Coloured: 60.9%
  - Indian/Asian: 0.4%
  - White: 23.4%

First languages (2011)
  - Afrikaans: 84.4%
  - Xhosa: 6.0%
  - English: 5.6%
  - Other: 4%
- Time zone: UTC+2 (SAST)
- Municipal code: WC033
- HDI (2021): 0.773 high

Cape Agulhas Municipality (Afrikaans: Kaap Agulhas Munisipaliteit) is a municipality located in the Western Cape province of South Africa. As of 2011, it had a population of 33,038. Its municipality code is WC033. It is named after Cape Agulhas, the southernmost point of Africa. The largest town is Bredasdorp, which is the seat of the municipal headquarters. It also includes the villages of Napier, Struisbaai, Elim, Arniston and L'Agulhas, and the De Hoop Nature Reserve.

== Geography ==
The municipality covers an area of 3,467 square kilometres (1,339 sq mi) in the Southern Overberg, covering a radius of 30 to 40 kilometres (19 to 25 mi) around Bredasdorp as well as a panhandle extending east to include the De Hoop Nature Reserve. A range of hills runs east–west through the municipality with a gap at Bredasdorp. South of these hills is the low and flat Agulhas plain. The municipality abuts on the Overstrand Municipality to the west, the Theewaterskloof Municipality to the northwest and the Swellendam Municipality to the north.

== Demographics ==
The 2022 South African census recorded a population of 40,274 people in the municipality, increasing at a rate of 1.9% annually from 2011. Of these, 60.9% identified as "Coloured," 23.4% as "White," and 12.6% as "Black African."

According to the 2011 census the municipality has a population of 33,038 people in 10,162 households. Of this population, 65.6% describe themselves as "Coloured", 21.6% as "White", and 11.5% as "Black African". The first language of 84.4% of the population is Afrikaans, while 6.0% speak Xhosa and 5.6% speak English.

The principal town and location of the municipal headquarters is Bredasdorp, which as of 2011 has a population of 15,524. Napier (pop. 4,214) is situated 15 kilometres (9 mi) northwest of Bredasdorp. South of Bredasdorp on the coast around Cape Agulhas are Struisbaai (pop. 3,877), L'Agulhas (pop. 548) and Suiderstrand (pop. 44). Arniston (pop. 1,267) is further east along the coast. The former mission station of Elim (pop. 1,412) is situated west of Bredasdorp.

== Politics ==
The municipal council consists of eleven members elected by mixed-member proportional representation. Six councillors are elected by first-past-the-post voting in six wards, while the remaining five are chosen from party lists so that the total number of party representatives is proportional to the number of votes received.

In the election of 6 November 2021, the Democratic Alliance (DA) won a plurality of five seats on the council, one short of a majority.

=== History ===
At end of the apartheid era in the early 1990s, municipal councils existed for Bredasdorp and Napier, and local councils for Waenhuiskrans (Arniston), Struisbaai and L'Agulhas. These councils were elected by the white residents of the towns. Coloured residents elected management committees, which were subordinate to the white local authorities, in Bredasdorp, Napier, Arniston and Struisbaai. Rural areas outside of these settlements were served by the Overberg Regional Services Council.

After the national elections of 1994 a process of local government transformation began, in which negotiations were held between the existing local authorities, political parties, and local community organisations. As a result of these negotiations, transitional local councils (TLCs) were created for each town and village. In December 1994 the Napier TLC was created, replacing the Municipality of Napier and the Napier Management Committee. In the same month the Struisbaai TLC replaced the Struisbaai Local Council and the Struisbaai Management Committee. In January 1995 the Bredasdorp TLC was created, amalgamating the Municipality of Bredasdorp, the Bredasdorp Management Committee, the Local Councils of Waenhuiskrans and L'Agulhas, and the Arniston Management Committee.

The transitional councils were initially made up of members nominated by the various parties to the negotiations, until May 1996 when elections were held. At these elections the Overberg District Council was established, replacing the Overberg Regional Services Council. Transitional representative councils (TRCs) were also elected to represent rural areas outside the TLCs on the District Council; the area that was to become the Cape Agulhas Municipality included most of the Bredasdorp TRC as well as parts of the Caledon TRC.

At the local elections of December 2000 the TLCs and TRCs were dissolved, and the Cape Agulhas Municipality was created as a single local authority incorporating both rural and urban areas. In 2006 the boundary with the Overstrand Municipality was moved further west to incorporate rural land north and south of Elim (although Elim itself was included in the municipality from 2000). In 2011 the area of the De Hoop Nature Reserve was incorporated into the municipality when District Management Areas were abolished.

=== Election results ===
The following table shows the results of the 2026 election.

Party	Ward			List			Total seats
Party	Votes	%	Seats	Votes	%	Seats	Total seats
Democratic Alliance	6,079	45.58	5	6,064	45.61	0	5
Patriotic Alliance	2,374	17.80	0	2,402	18.07	2	2
African National Congress	1,866	13.99	1	1,832	13.78	1	2
Freedom Front Plus	1,489	11.17	0	1,548	11.64	1	1
Dienslewerings Party	1,158	8.68	0	1,100	8.27	1	1
8 other parties	370	2.77	0	348	2.62	0	0
Total	13,336	100.00	6	13,294	100.00	5	11
Valid votes	13,336	98.26		13,294	98.07		
Invalid/blank votes	236	1.74		261	1.93		
Total votes	13,572	100.00		13,555	100.00		
Registered voters/turnout	23,195	58.51		23,195	58.44		
