= Wolvengat =

Wolvengat Viljoenshof
- Location within Western Cape Location within South Africa
- Coordinates: 34.6700°S 19.7000°E
- Country: South Africa
- Province: Western Cape
- District: Overberg
- Municipality: Overstrand

Area
  - Total: 1.36 km^{2} (0.53 sq mi)

Population (2011)
  - Total: 50
  - Density: 37/km^{2} (95/sq mi)

Racial makeup (2011)
  - Black African: 11.8%
  - Coloured: 41.2%
  - White: 43.1%
  - Other: 3.9%

First languages (2011)
  - Afrikaans: 80.4%
  - English: 19.6%
- Time zone: UTC+2 (SAST)

Wolvengat, also known as Viljoenshof, is a village in the southern Overberg region, in the Western Cape province of South Africa. It is situated 10 kilometres (6 mi) south of Elim and 35 kilometres (22 mi) southwest of Bredasdorp. It was originally named Wolfgat or Wolvengat in reference to the brown hyena, known as strandwolf in Afrikaans. However, when the local post office was established the authorities named it Viljoenshof in honour of DJ Viljoen, the Dutch Reformed (NGK) minister of Bredasdorp from 1904 to 1934; this name was then extended to the village. The original name Wolvengat was officially restored in 1991.

In the early 1900s the village had a school with 100 children, but by the early 21st century there was neither a church nor a school. The fertile soil, and the potential of using land for vineyards, explains the high property prices.
