= Dutch Reformed Church, Bredasdorp =

Church in Bredasdorp, South Africa

Coordinates: 34.5335°S 20.0383°E

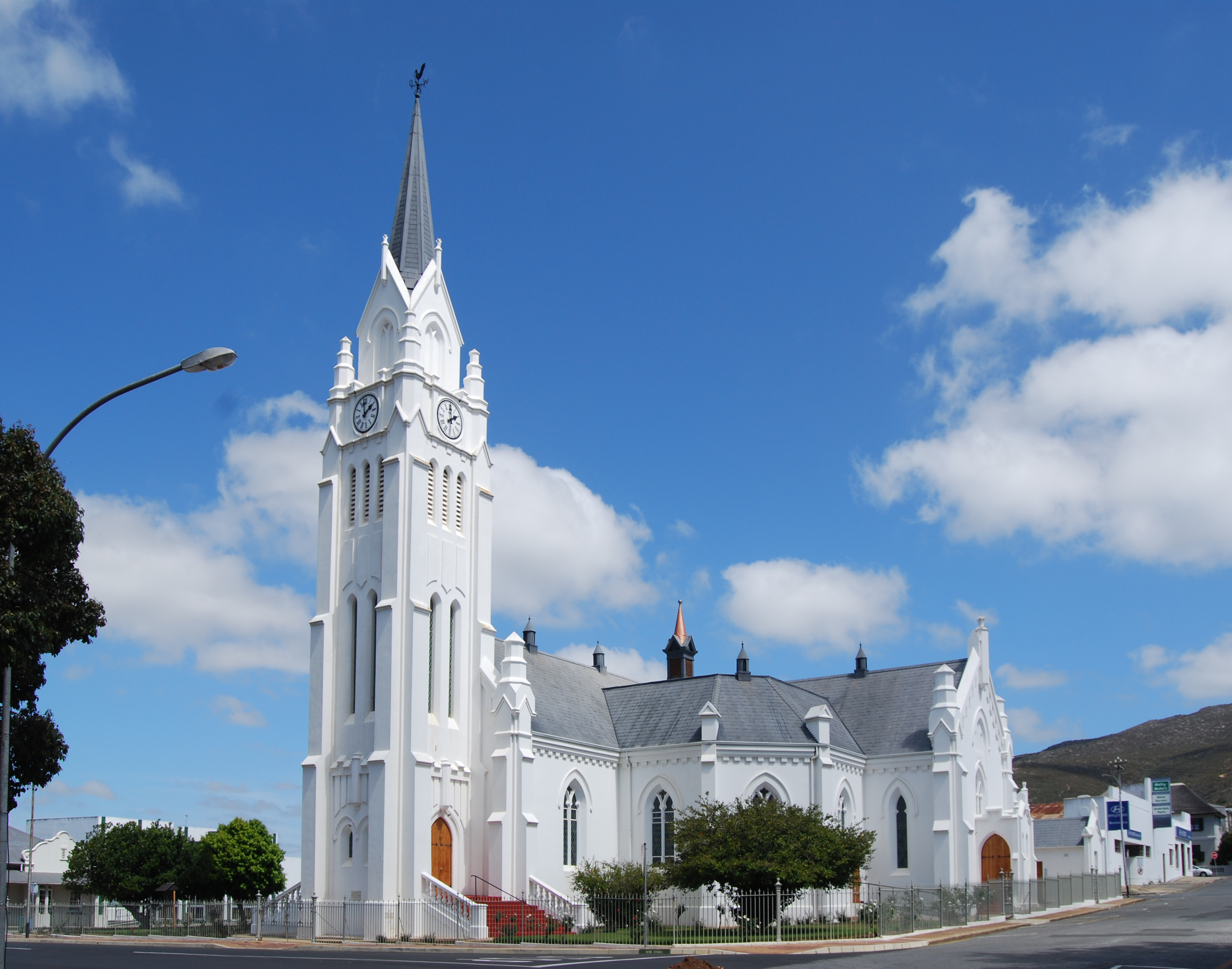

The Dutch Reformed Church in Bredasdorp is the 23rd existing congregation of the Dutch Reformed Church. Along the coast between Cape Town and George it is the third oldest parish, after Swellendam (1798) and Caledon (1811), and only about a month older than Riversdale, which was founded in April 1839.

The NG Mission Church was formed in the late 1800s, though only white members were allowed to attend. The Associate Reformed Church was established at the same location in 1914. The two churches remained separate until 20 May 2018.

== Ministers ==
- Johannes Jacobus Brink, 1839 – 1861
- Charles Marais, 1862 – 1890
- Benjamin Duminy, 1891 – 1897
- Johan Augustinus Koch, 1898 – 1903
- Daniel Jozua Viljoen, 1904 – 1934
- Johannes Zacharias Eloff, 1934 – 1946
- Christoffel Hermanus Latsky, 1943 – 1948
- Jacobus Johannes Christiaan Struwig, 1944 – 1948
- Frederic John Berning Malan, 1947 – 1960
- Pieter Jacobus Raubenheimer, 1949 – 191
- W. W. Greeff, 1951–?
- Frederik Johannes Conradie, 1953 – 1956
- Hendrik Christoffel van den Berg, 1959 – 1966
- Tobias Johannes de Clercq, 1962 – 1964
- Barend Pieter van Zyl, 1964 – 1968
- Jan Michael Ackerman, 1965 – 1966
- Stephanus Botes, 1967 – 1970
- Hermanus Jacobus Strydom, 1994 – 1997
- Abraham Johannes Coetzee, 2003 – present
- Johannes Willem De Wet, 2004 – 2011
- Maryke Maria Venter, 2016 – 2020 (pln)
- Jaco Botha, 2019 – 2022
- Karlie Liebenberg, 2021 - 2025 (Partnership with URCSA)
- Pieter Nel, 2023 - present
