= L'Agulhas =

L'Agulhas Agulhas
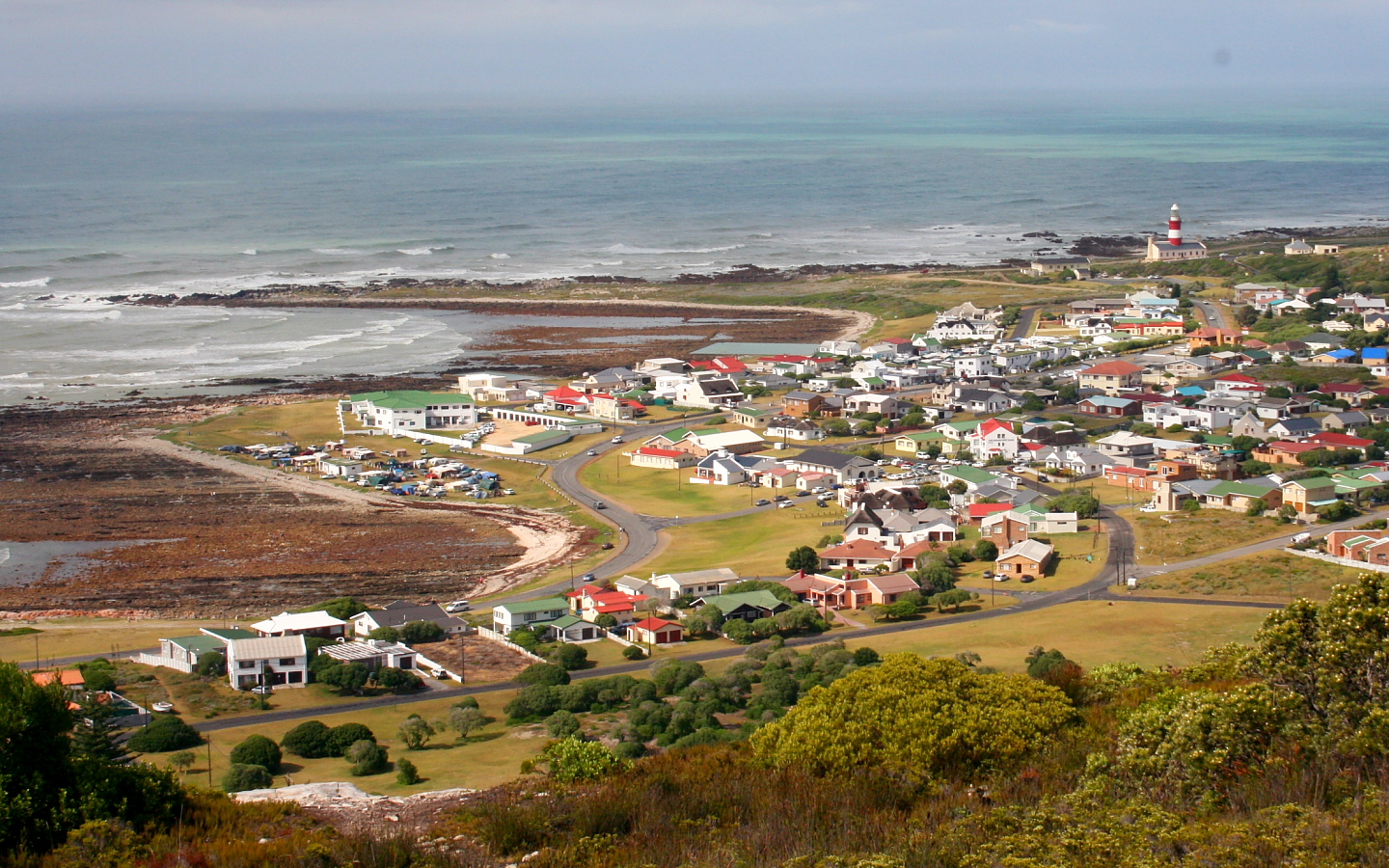
- View over L'Agulhas

- Location within Western Cape Location within South Africa
- Coordinates: 34°49′20″S 20°1′0″E
- Country: South Africa
- Province: Western Cape
- District: Overberg
- Municipality: Cape Agulhas

Area
  - Total: 7.49 km^{2} (2.89 sq mi)

Population (2011)
  - Total: 548
  - Density: 73.2/km^{2} (189/sq mi)

Racial makeup (2011)
  - Black African: 7.1%
  - Coloured: 4.6%
  - Indian/Asian: 0.2%
  - White: 86.3%
  - Other: 1.8%

First languages (2011)
  - Afrikaans: 80.7%
  - English: 17.0%
  - Other: 2.3%
- Time zone: UTC+2 (SAST)
- Postal code (street): 7287
- Area code: 028435

L'Agulhas is the southernmost coastal village and holiday resort in South Africa, located within the Cape Agulhas Local Municipality at the southernmost tip of the African mainland. It is situated next to the town of Struisbaai and about 30 kilometres (20 mi) south of the regional centre of Bredasdorp. Some of the older residents and documents refer to the town by its former name Cape Agulhas or Cape L'Agulhas or simply Agulhas which were the names that referred to this town before it was changed to L'Agulhas to avoid confusion when the Bredasdorp Municipality changed its name to The Cape Agulhas Municipality (CAM).

== Etymology ==
Agulhas is the plural form of “agulha” in Portuguese. It is derived from the Late Latin word, “acūcula,” and the Latin word “acula,” both meaning a needle or pin. They trace back to the theorized Proto-Indo-European word “h₂eḱ.”

According to local legend, when sailing to the cape, sailors saw the compass needle point North, directly to the modern day location of L’Agulhas.

== Lighthouse ==
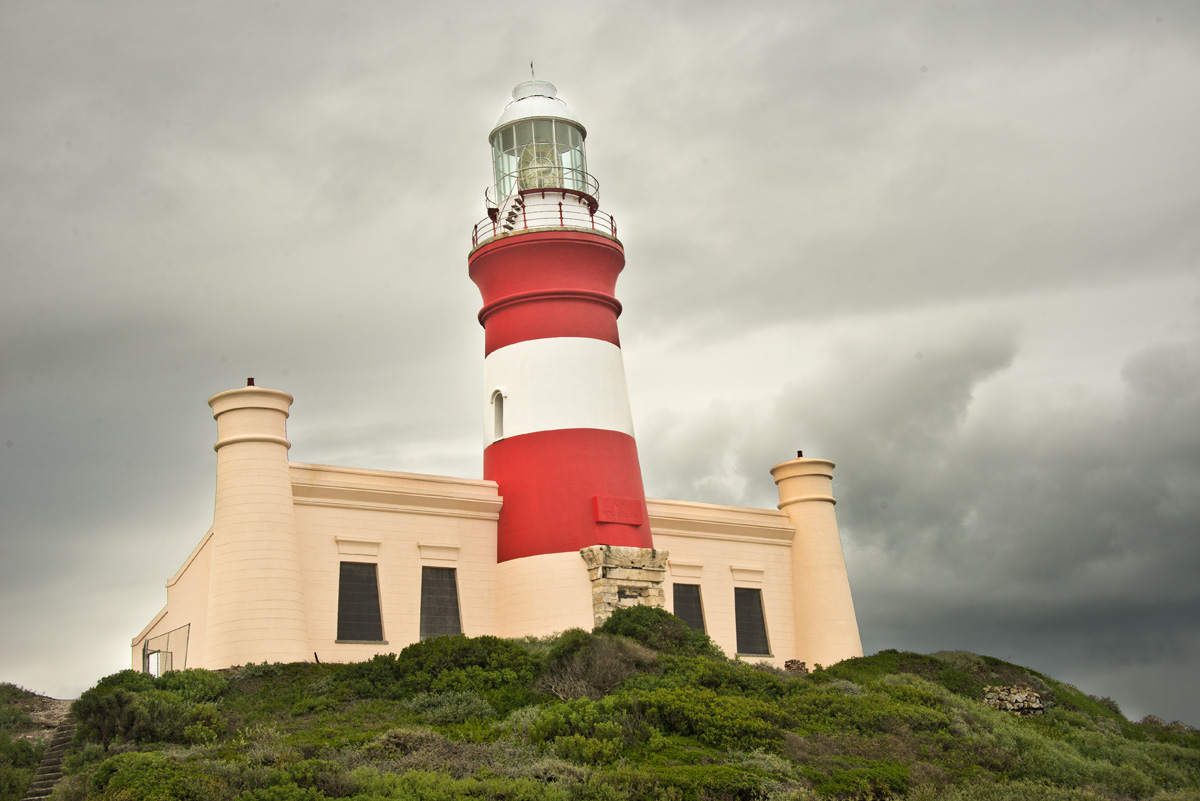
The Cape Agulhas Lighthouse.

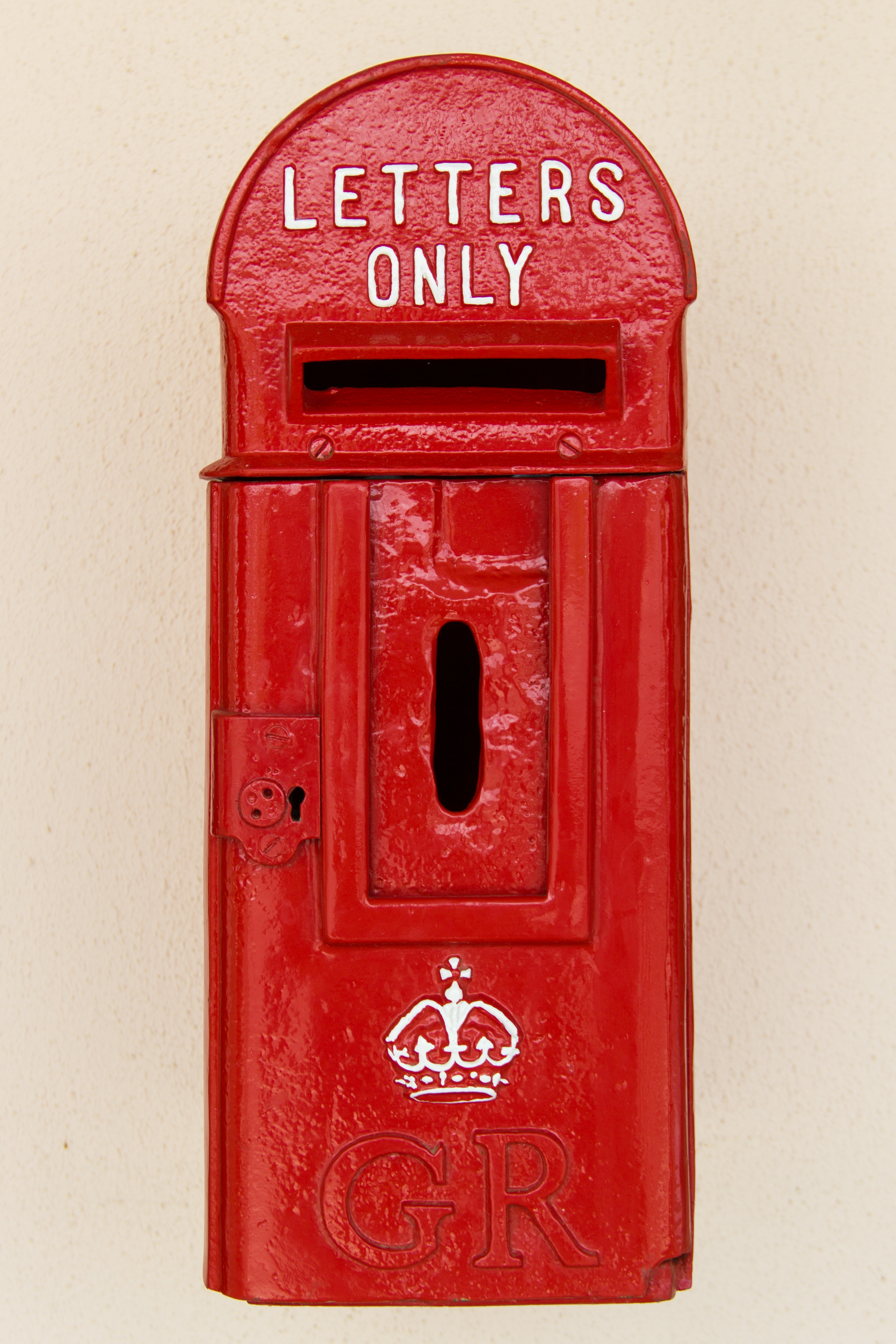
Post box at Cape Agulhas, the southernmost post box in Africa.

The Cape Agulhas Lighthouse, the second-oldest working lighthouse in South Africa, is at the southern end of the town. Designed by Colonel Charles Cornwell Michell in homage to the Pharos of Alexandria, the lighthouse was lit on March 1, 1849. Some 150 ships lay scattered along the South African coast, many due to the treacherous Agulhas Reef. The lighthouse was declared a National Monument in 1973.

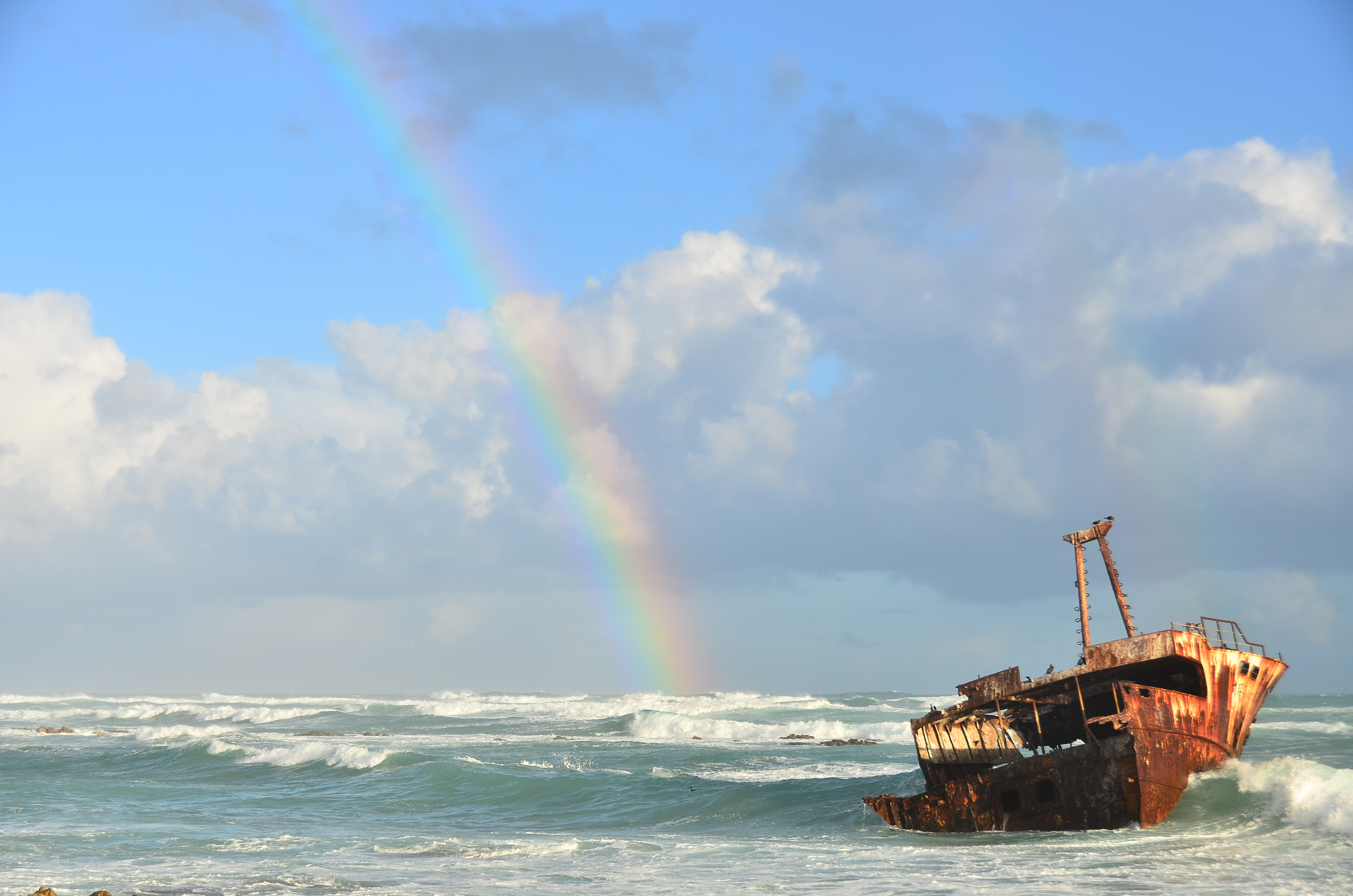
The wreck of the Meisho Maru near Cape Agulhas.

== Geography ==
=== Climate ===
L'Agulhas has a mild semi-arid climate (BSk, according to the Köppen climate classification). Summers are mild and dry, winters are cool and wetter. The average annual precipitation is 276 mm (11 in), with most rainfall occurring mainly during winter.

=== Fishing ===
The local Agulhas Bank, known for its fishing, is reputed to have the richest fishing area in the Southern Hemisphere.

L'Agulhas

Climate chart (precipitation, max. and min. temperature)
J	F	M	A	M	J	J	A	S	O	N	D
10 25 15	11 25 15	17 24 14	28 22 12	32 20 9	35 18 7	36 17 7	33 17 7	23 19 8	23 20 10	18 22 12	10 24 14
- █ Average max. and min. temperatures in °C
- █ Precipitation totals in mm
- Source: SA Explorer
Imperial conversion
J	F	M	A	M	J	J	A	S	O	N	D
0.4 77 59	0.4 77 59	0.7 75 57	1.1 72 54	1.3 68 48	1.4 64 45	1.4 63 45	1.3 63 45	0.9 66 46	0.9 68 50	0.7 72 54	0.4 75 57
- █ Average max. and min. temperatures in °F
- █ Precipitation totals in inches

Another source gives different data, showing that it has a warm-summer Mediterranean climate (Köppen: Csb), with most precipitation falling in June.

Climate data for L'Agulhas
Month	Jan	Feb	Mar	Apr	May	Jun	Jul	Aug	Sep	Oct	Nov	Dec	Year
Mean daily maximum °C (°F)	24 (75)	23.8 (74.8)	22.7 (72.9)	20.9 (69.6)	19.3 (66.7)	18 (64)	16.9 (62.4)	17.1 (62.8)	17.9 (64.2)	19.2 (66.6)	21.1 (70.0)	23 (73)	20.3 (68.5)
Daily mean °C (°F)	20.6 (69.1)	20.5 (68.9)	19.6 (67.3)	17.7 (63.9)	15.8 (60.4)	14.5 (58.1)	13.6 (56.5)	13.8 (56.8)	14.6 (58.3)	16 (61)	17.8 (64.0)	19.5 (67.1)	17.0 (62.6)
Mean daily minimum °C (°F)	17.3 (63.1)	17.3 (63.1)	16.5 (61.7)	14.5 (58.1)	12.3 (54.1)	11 (52)	10.3 (50.5)	10.5 (50.9)	11.4 (52.5)	12.9 (55.2)	14.6 (58.3)	16.1 (61.0)	13.7 (56.7)
Average precipitation mm (inches)	17 (0.7)	23 (0.9)	27 (1.1)	63 (2.5)	63 (2.5)	69 (2.7)	64 (2.5)	56 (2.2)	41 (1.6)	40 (1.6)	30 (1.2)	24 (0.9)	517 (20.4)
Source: Climate-Data.org

== See also ==
- Cape Agulhas
- Agulhas National Park

Cape of Gòod Hope
