= Agulhas National Park =

Park in South Africa

- IUCN category II (national park)
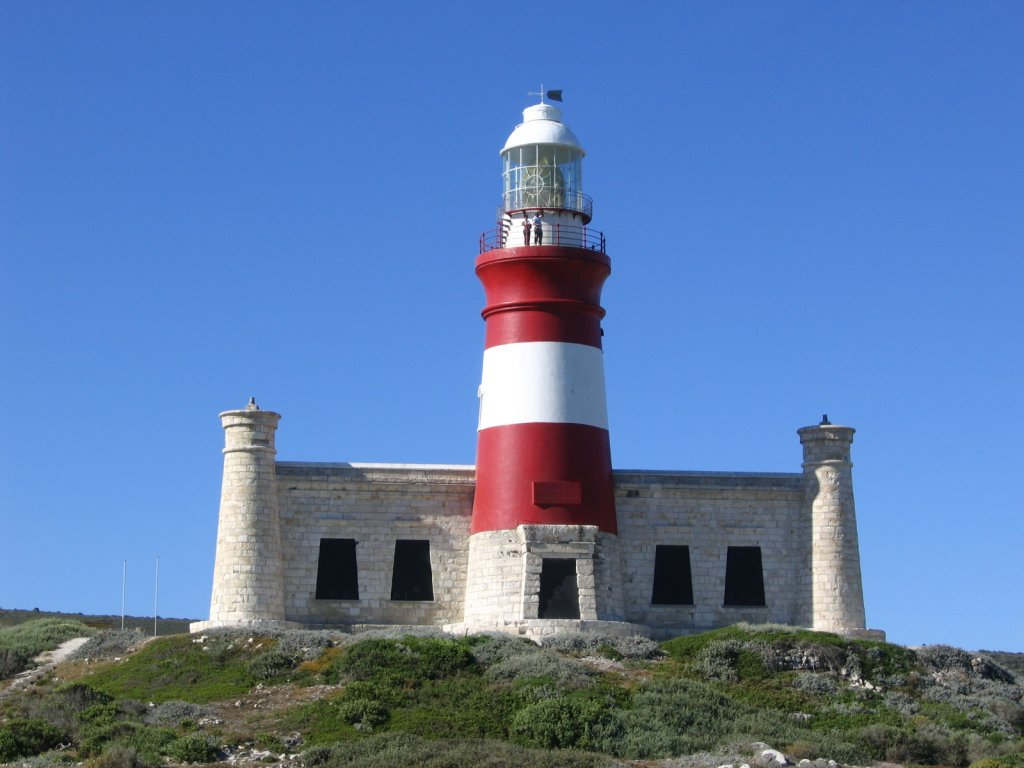
- The Cape Agulhas lighthouse
- Location: Western Cape, South Africa
- Nearest city: Struisbaai
- Coordinates: 34°50′S 20°00′E
- Area: 209.59 km^{2} (80.92 sq mi)
- Established: 14 September 1998
- Governing body: South African National Parks
- Website: www.sanparks.org/parks/agulhas/
- Agulhas National Park (South Africa)

The Agulhas National Park is a South African national park located in the Agulhas Plain in the southern Overberg region of the Western Cape, about 200 kilometres (120 mi) south-east of Cape Town. The park stretches along the coastal plain between the towns of Gansbaai and Struisbaai, and includes the southern tip of Africa at Cape Agulhas. As of January 2009 it covered an area of 20,959 hectares (51,790 acres). Although one of the smallest national parks in South Africa, it has 2,000 native plant species and a wetland that provides refuge to birds and amphibians.

== Points of interest ==
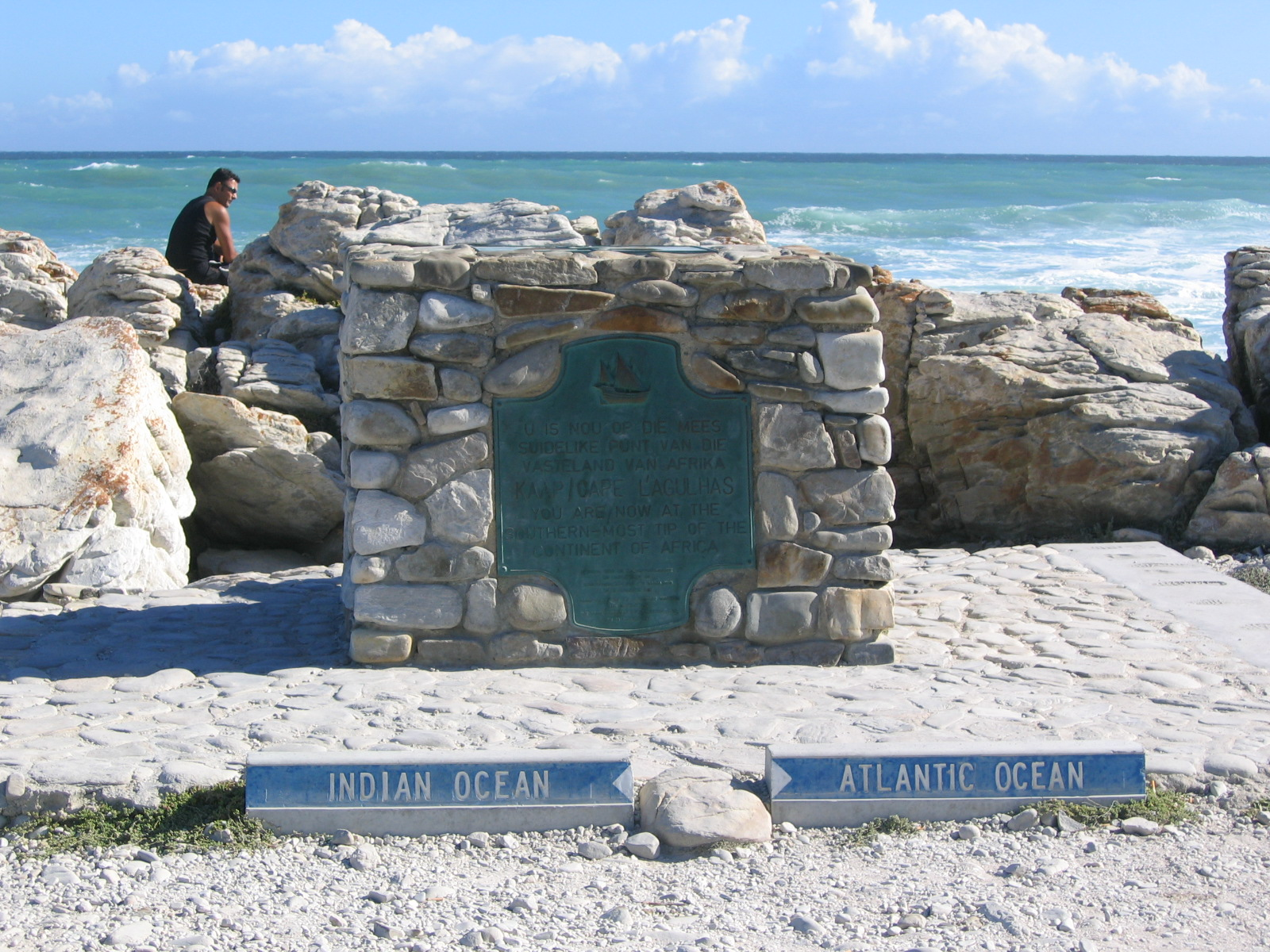
Plaque at Cape Agulhas

The primary tourist attraction in the park is Cape Agulhas, the southernmost tip of Africa and the official meeting-point of the Atlantic and Indian Oceans. Nearby is the Agulhas lighthouse, the second-oldest lighthouse in South Africa, which also includes a small museum and tearoom.

- Whale watching in season – November to January.
- Animals to see include the southern right whale, African black oystercatcher, Damara tern and Cape platanna.
- Shipwrecks: several ships, including De Zoetendal, HMS Birkenhead, and HMS Arniston. Foundered on the rocks near Cape Agulhas. Relics from some of the wrecks can be seen in the Bredasdorp Shipwreck Museum.
- Fynbos: hundreds of indigenous fynbos species are found here.
- A rich fish bank known as the Agulhas Bank.
