= Bredasdorp =

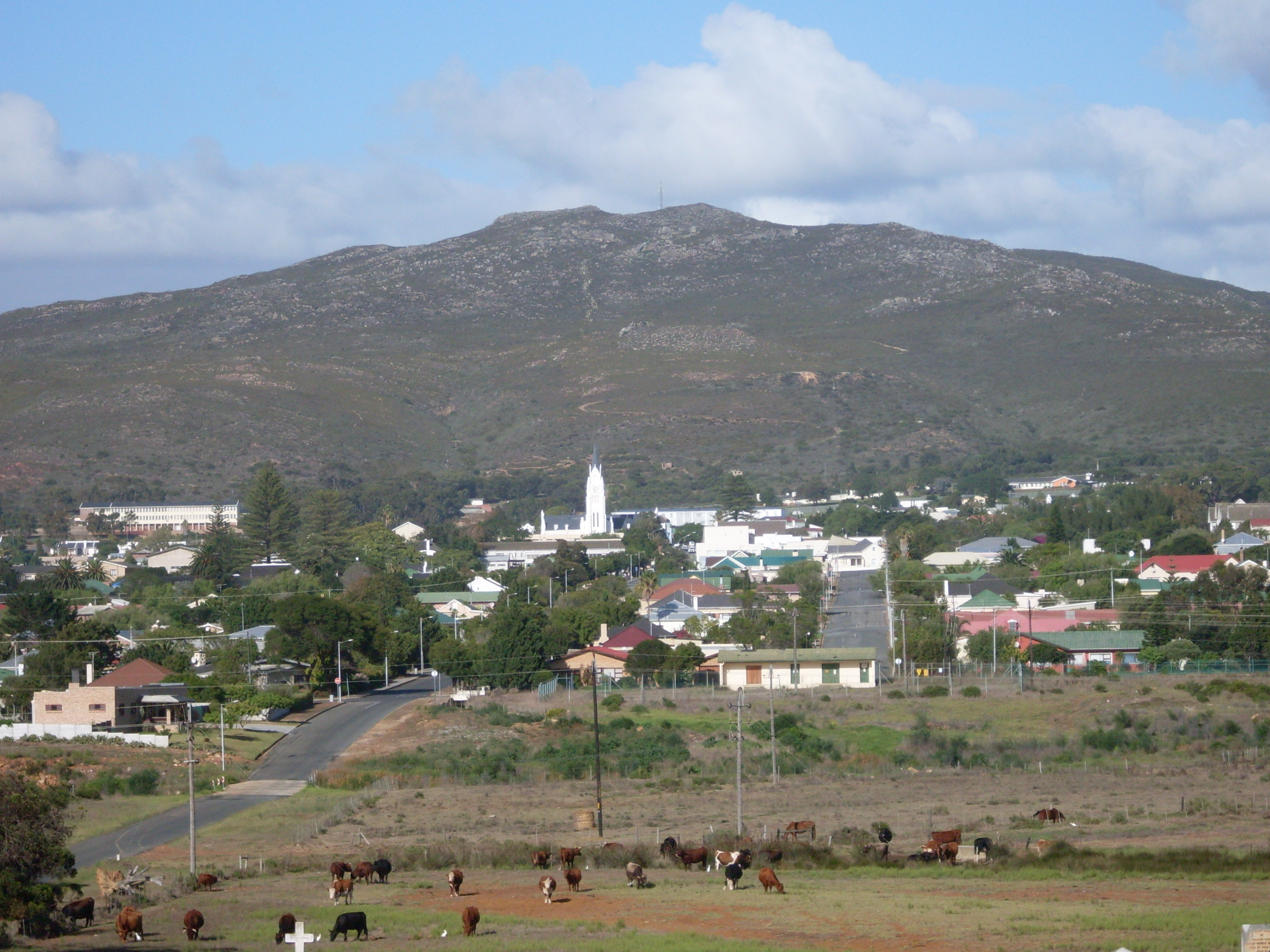
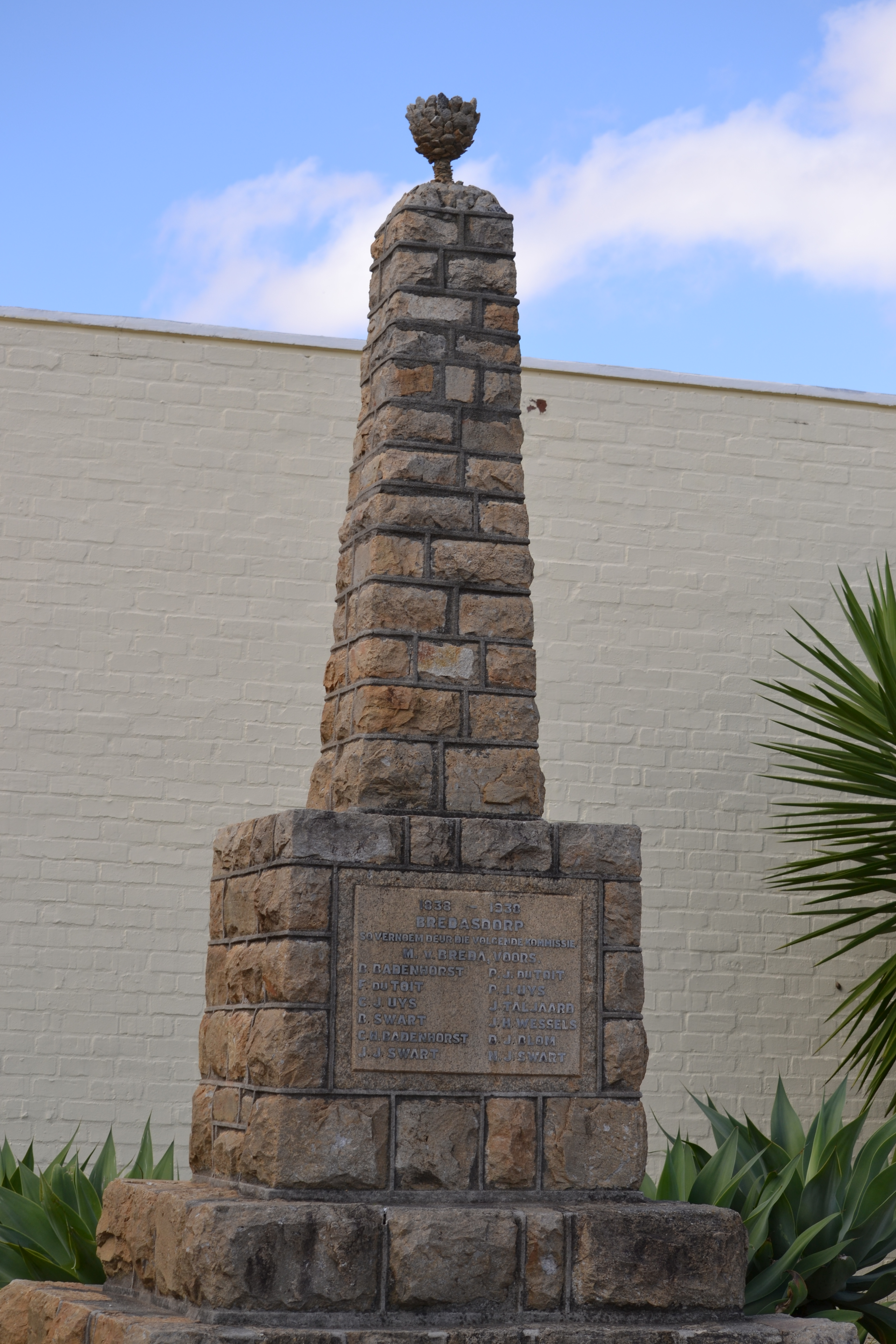
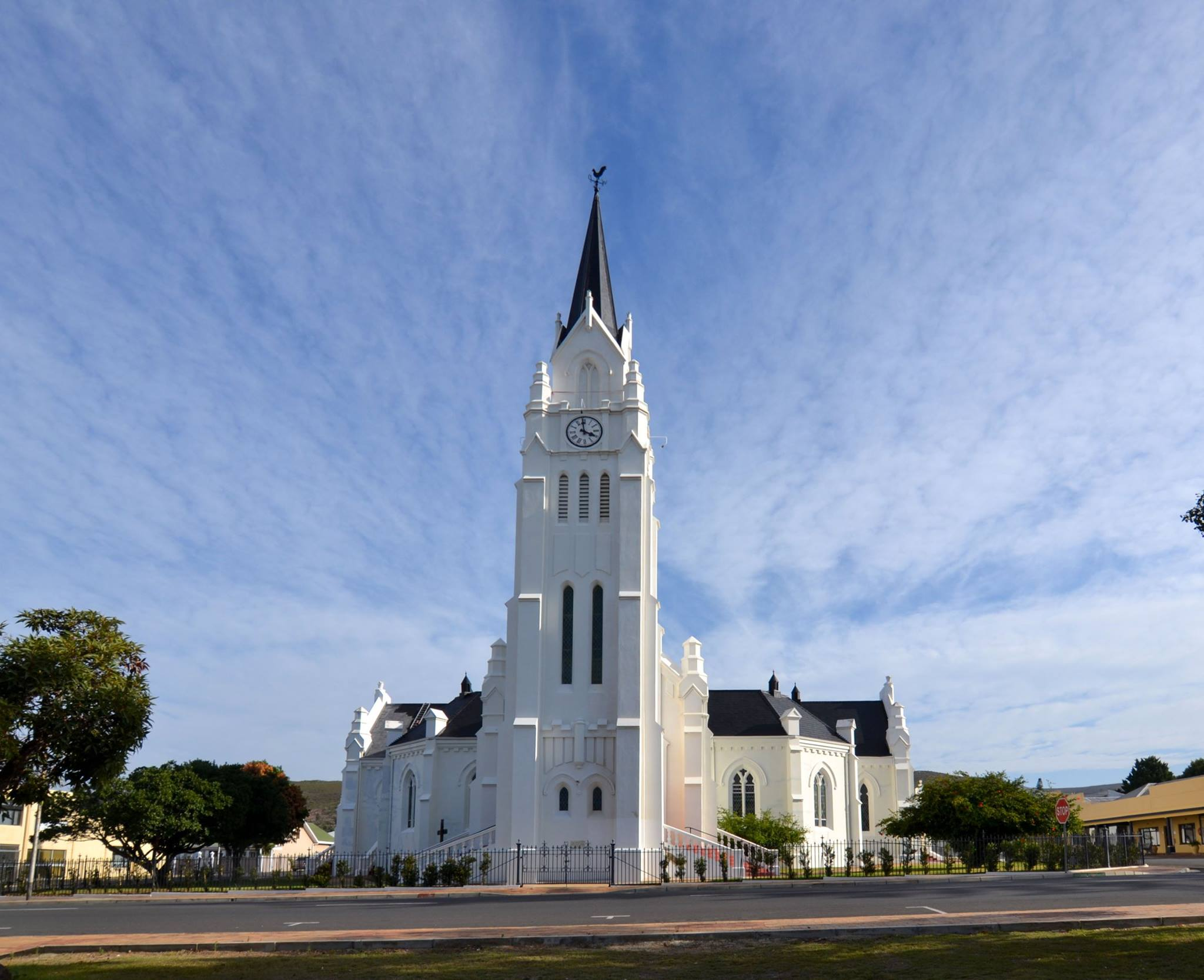
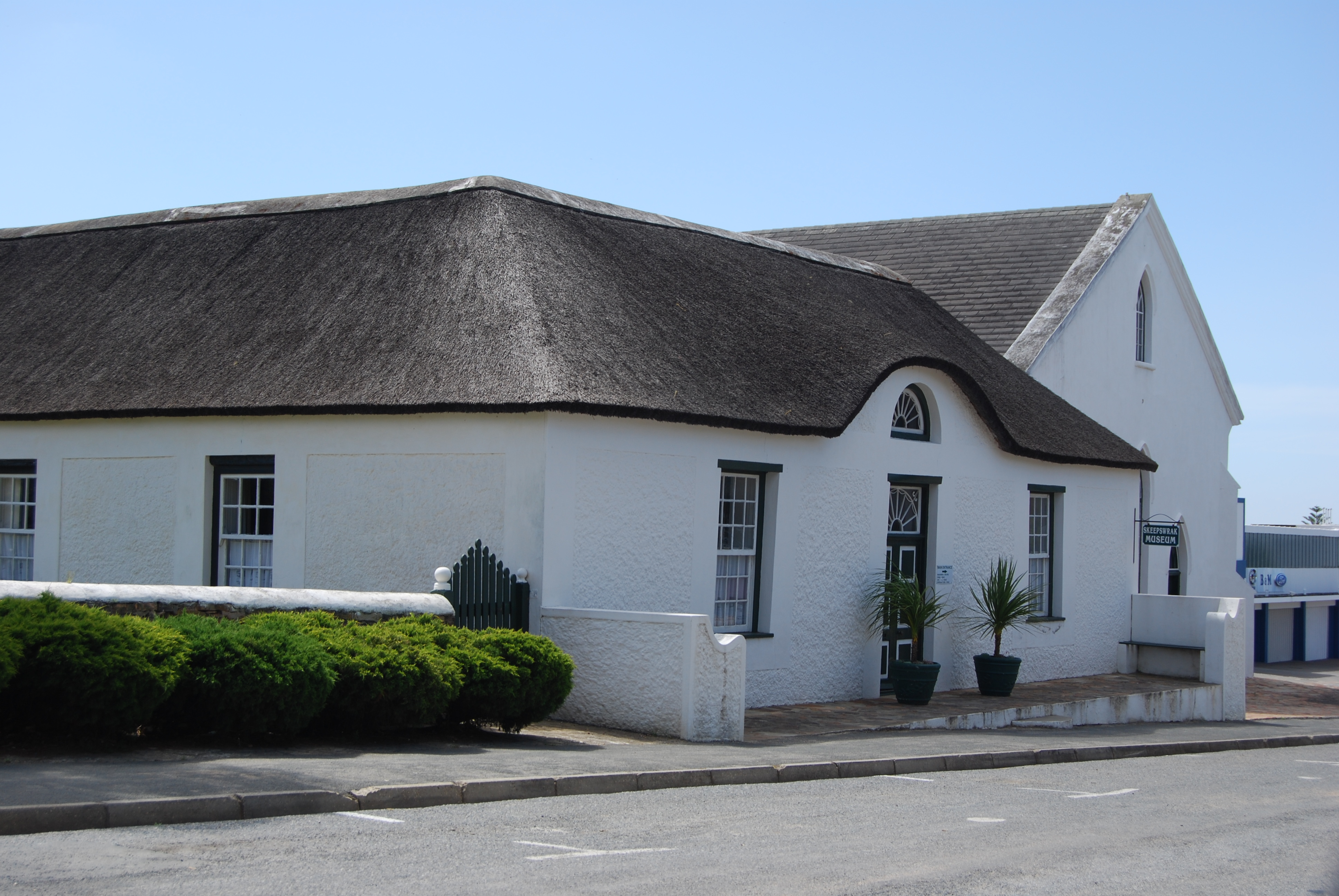
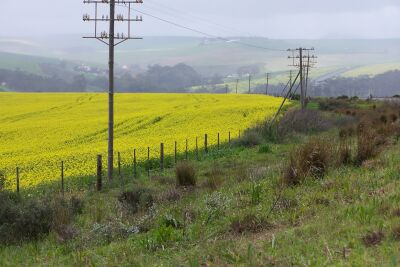
- Top: View of Bredasdorp, Middle left: Bredasdorp Memorial, right: NG Church, Bottom left: Bredasdorp Museum, right: Canola fields near Bredasdorp
- Motto: Lux In Tenebris (Latin: Light in the darkness)
- Location within Western Cape Location within South Africa Location within Africa
- Coordinates: 34°32′00″S 20°02′30″E
- Country: South Africa
- Province: Western Cape
- District: Overberg
- Municipality: Cape Agulhas
- Established: 1838

Government
  - Councillors: Johan Nieuwoudt (Ward 4); Karin Donald (Ward 2)

Area
  - Total: 25.15 km^{2} (9.71 sq mi)

Population (2011)
  - Total: 15,524
  - Density: 617.3/km^{2} (1,599/sq mi)

Racial makeup (2011)
  - Black African: 12.7%
  - Coloured: 66.5%
  - Indian/Asian: 0.4%
  - White: 19.0%
  - Other: 1.3%

First languages (2011)
  - Afrikaans: 83.1%
  - Xhosa: 7.5%
  - English: 4.3%
  - Other: 5.0%
- Time zone: UTC+2 (SAST)
- Postal code (street): 7280
- PO box: 7280
- Area code: 028

Bredasdorp is a town in the Southern Overberg region of the Western Cape, South Africa, and the main economic and service hub of that region. It lies on the northern edge of the Agulhas Plain, about 160 kilometres (100 mi) south-east of Cape Town and 35 kilometres (22 mi) north of Cape Agulhas, the southernmost tip of Africa.

Tourist attractions of Bredasdorp include the Heuningberg Nature Reserve, many historical churches, and art galleries and craft shops. Bredasdorp is also home to the Shipwreck Museum which tells the stories of the 150 wrecks along the nearby Agulhas Reef. It is the only museum of its kind in the southern hemisphere.

== History ==
The town of Bredasdorp was founded with the building of a Dutch Reformed Church in 1838 on the farm Langefontein. The town was named after Michiel van Breda, the first Mayor of Cape Town, who was also known as the father of South Africa's merino sheep industry. Van Breda and Pieter Voltelyn van der Byl could not agree on a location for the church; as a result, two churches were built, and two towns, Bredasdorp and Napier, were established.

== Government ==
Bredasdorp is located in the Cape Agulhas Local Municipality; as the largest town in the municipality, Bredasdorp is divided between its second, third and fourth wards. The local municipality in turn forms part of the Overberg District Municipality; Bredasdorp is the location of the head offices of both municipalities.

The area of Bredasdorp is divided into two wards with two councillors; Johan Nieuwoudt serves as councillor for Ward 4 and Karin Donald serves as councillor for Ward 2.

== Geography ==
Bredasdorp

Climate chart (precipitation, max. and min. temperature)
J	F	M	A	M	J	J	A	S	O	N	D
25 26 17	29 26 17	30 24 16	52 22 14	38 20 12	51 18 10	50 17 9	56 18 9	30 19 10	35 21 12	27 23 14	19 25 16
- █ Average max. and min. temperatures in °C
- █ Precipitation totals in mm
Imperial conversion
J	F	M	A	M	J	J	A	S	O	N	D
1 79 63	1.1 79 63	1.2 75 61	2 72 57	1.5 68 54	2 64 50	2 63 48	2.2 64 48	1.2 66 50	1.4 70 54	1.1 73 57	0.7 77 61
- █ Average max. and min. temperatures in °F
- █ Precipitation totals in inches

Bredasdorp is situated at an elevation of between 40 and 120 metres (130 and 390 ft) on the slopes of the Heuningberg (Afrikaans for "Honey Mountain"). There is no significant watercourse flowing through the town, although the Kars River flows past a few kilometres to the east.

Bredasdorp shares in the Mediterranean climate experienced in most of the Western Cape. Its proximity to the ocean, which is less than 25 kilometres (16 mi) away at Arniston, moderates the variation of temperature. Bredasdorp is mostly surrounded by farmland, chiefly grain, cattle and sheep farming; on the south-west side of the town the Heuningberg Nature Reserve protects the indigenous fynbos vegetation.

Onmeetbarediepgat is one of the major caves in the Quaternary limestone formations in the district of Bredasdorp. In Afrikaans Onmeetbarediepgat means "Immeasurably deep hole". The cave system is expressed at the surface as a sinkhole about 50 metres wide and 20 metres deep. The bottom is covered with limestone rubble. A small hole leads into a substantial cave system, which has been explored since the 1950s, mainly by cavers belonging to the South African Spelaeological Association (SASA). Entry to distant parts of the cave is hindered by sumps.

== Demography ==
In the census of 2011, the population of Bredasdorp consisted of 15,524 people living in 4,521 households. 66.5% of the people described themselves as "Coloured", 19% as "White" and 12.7% as "Black African". 83% spoke Afrikaans as their first language, 7.5% spoke Xhosa, and 4.3% spoke English.

== Economy ==
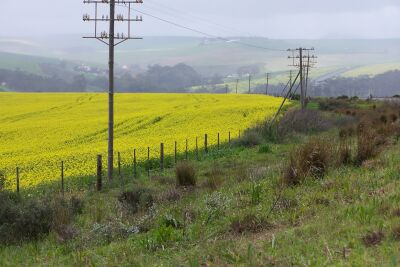
Canola fields near Bredasdorp

Besides the sheep farming, the town also boasts other agricultural activities, including wheat, canola, milk, and indigenous fynbos cultivation. The town is also the location of the offices of Kapula Candles, an international candle company that exports hand-painted candles to Europe and the United States. The population of the town got a boost during the middle 1980s with the establishment of both the South African Air Force's Air Force Base Overberg which is home to the Test Flight and Development Centre as well as the Denel Overberg Test Range near the small coastal village of Arniston.

== Surrounding towns in the Overberg District ==
- Arniston (Waenhuiskrans), 24 km
- L'Agulhas, 34 km (Southernmost town in Africa)
- Napier, 14 km
- Caledon, 74 km
- Swellendam, 69 km
- Struisbaai, 28 km

== Culture ==
- The town has a museum dedicated to the shipwreck of the Arniston.
- Audrey Blignault Room: Furnished in honour of Audrey Blignault who was born in Bredasdorp and who enjoyed national recognition as a writer.
- The Heuningberg Nature Reserve is open to the public and views can be enjoyed of this rich fauna and flora area.

== Coats of arms ==
Municipality (1) — In 1938, the town council adopted a pseudo-heraldic "coat of arms". The shield depicted a map of South Africa, with a dot marking Bredasdorp. In the centre of the map was a disc displaying a sheaf of wheat, a merino ram, a goat and a protea flower. A lighthouse was placed above the shield.

Municipality (2) — The council assumed a proper coat of arms in 1966. It was granted by the administrator of the Cape Province on 12 August 1966 and registered at the Bureau of Heraldry in September 1969.

The arms were : Per chevron Azure and Or, in chief a garb and a merino ram's head Or, in base a protea flower slipped and leaved proper. In layman's terms : the shield was divided into blue over gold by a chevron-shaped line and displayed a golden sheaf of wheat and a merino ram's head at the top and a protea flower with stem and leaves at the bottom.

The crest was a lighthouse and the motto Lux in tenebris. Two bontebok supported the shield.

Divisional council — The Bredasdorp divisional council (the local authority for the rural areas outside the town) approved its own coat of arms on 22 October 1965. The arms were granted by the administrator of the Cape Province on 1 September 1967 and registered at the Bureau of Heraldry in September 1969.

The arms, designed by Schalk Pienaar, were : Azure, a chevron between two wheatsheaves in chief Or, and in base a Merino ram's head caboshed proper; on a chief Or three Bredasdorp lilies proper. In layman's terms : a blue shield displaying, from top to bottom, three Bredasdorp lilies on a gold stripe, two golden sheaves of wheat, a golden chevron, and a merino ram's head in natural colours.

The crest was a lighthouse and the motto In concilio concilium.
