= Cape Agulhas =

Headland in the Western Cape, South Africa

Coordinates: 34°49′59.6″S 20°00′0″E

Cape Agulhas is the southernmost part of South Africa. Also shown is the Cape of Good Hope at the southern tip of the Cape Peninsula, approximately 50 km (31 mi) south of central Cape Town.

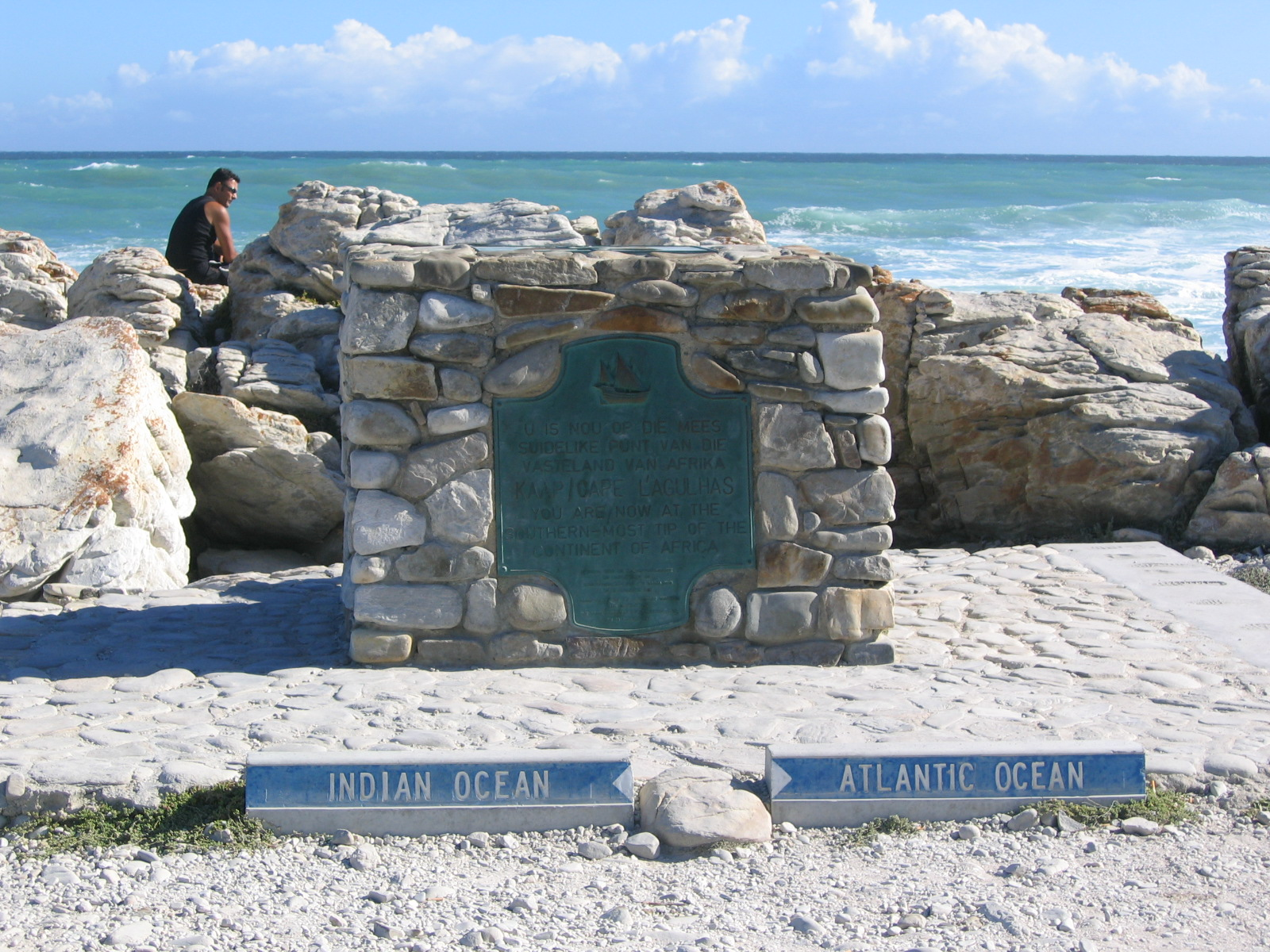
A marker at Cape Agulhas indicates the official dividing line between the Atlantic and Indian oceans.

Cape Agulhas (/əˈɡʊljəs/; Portuguese: Cabo das Agulhas [ˈkaβu ðɐz ɐˈɣuʎɐʃ], "Cape of Needles") is a rocky headland in Western Cape, South Africa. It is both the southernmost point of South Africa, the geographic southern tip of Africa and the beginning of the traditional dividing line between the Atlantic and Indian oceans according to the International Hydrographic Organization. It is approximately half a degree of latitude, or 55 kilometres (34 mi), farther south than the Cape of Good Hope.

Historically, the cape has been known to sailors as a significant hazard on the traditional clipper route. It is sometimes regarded as one of the great capes. It was most commonly known in English as Cape L'Agulhas until the 20th century. The town of L'Agulhas is near the cape.

== Geography ==
Cape Agulhas is located in the Overberg region, 170 kilometres (105 mi) southeast of Cape Town. The cape was named by Portuguese navigators, who called it Cabo das Agulhas—Portuguese for "Cape of Needles"—after noticing that around the year 1500 the direction of magnetic north (and therefore the compass needle) coincided with true north in the region. The cape is within the Cape Agulhas Local Municipality in the Overberg District of the Western Cape province of South Africa.

South of Cape Agulhas, the warm Agulhas Current, which flows south along the east coast of Africa, retroflects back into the Indian Ocean. While retroflecting, it pinches off large ocean eddies (Agulhas rings) that drift into the South Atlantic Ocean, carrying enormous amounts of heat and salt into the neighbouring ocean. This mechanism constitutes one of the key elements in the global conveyor belt circulation of heat and salt.

Cape Agulhas has a gradually curving coastline with rocky and sandy beaches. A survey marker and a new marker depicting the African continent are located at the southernmost tip of Africa. The waters of the Agulhas Bank off the coast are relatively shallow and are renowned as one of the best fishing grounds in South Africa.

The rocks that form Cape Agulhas belong to the Table Mountain Group, often loosely referred to as the Table Mountain sandstone. They are closely linked to the geological formations that are exposed in the spectacular cliffs of Table Mountain, Cape Point, and the Cape of Good Hope.

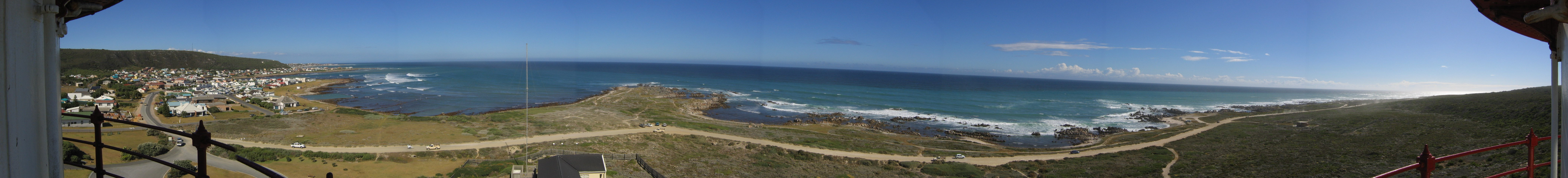
Panorama from the lighthouse around the cape

== Climate ==
Cape Agulhas has a warm Mediterranean climate (Köppen climate classification: Csb). The climate is consistently mild, with no temperature or rainfall extremes. According to South African National Parks, who administer the nature reserve, the average rainfall is 400–600 mm per annum, mostly received in winter. Temperature climate data is available for Cape Agulhas, averages are:

Climate data for Cape Agulhas (1991–2020 normals)
Month	Jan	Feb	Mar	Apr	May	Jun	Jul	Aug	Sep	Oct	Nov	Dec	Year
Record high °C (°F)	28.9 (84.0)	36.1 (97.0)	35.0 (95.0)	35.6 (96.1)	33.9 (93.0)	30.0 (86.0)	29.4 (84.9)	31.7 (89.1)	32.2 (90.0)	26.1 (79.0)	30.6 (87.1)	30.6 (87.1)	36.1 (97.0)
Mean daily maximum °C (°F)	24.6 (76.3)	24.6 (76.3)	23.3 (73.9)	21.0 (69.8)	19.8 (67.6)	18.5 (65.3)	17.9 (64.2)	18.0 (64.4)	18.7 (65.7)	20.2 (68.4)	21.7 (71.1)	23.7 (74.7)	21.0 (69.8)
Daily mean °C (°F)	21.4 (70.5)	21.5 (70.7)	20.3 (68.5)	18.1 (64.6)	16.7 (62.1)	15.1 (59.2)	14.5 (58.1)	14.7 (58.5)	15.5 (59.9)	17.3 (63.1)	18.5 (65.3)	20.6 (69.1)	17.9 (64.1)
Mean daily minimum °C (°F)	18.2 (64.8)	18.5 (65.3)	17.3 (63.1)	15.2 (59.4)	13.6 (56.5)	11.8 (53.2)	11.1 (52.0)	11.3 (52.3)	12.4 (54.3)	14.3 (57.7)	15.4 (59.7)	17.5 (63.5)	14.7 (58.5)
Record low °C (°F)	8.3 (46.9)	8.9 (48.0)	9.4 (48.9)	5.0 (41.0)	4.4 (39.9)	5.6 (42.1)	3.9 (39.0)	4.4 (39.9)	4.4 (39.9)	5.0 (41.0)	5.0 (41.0)	5.0 (41.0)	3.9 (39.0)
Average precipitation mm (inches)	20.3 (0.80)	17.8 (0.70)	33.0 (1.30)	38.1 (1.50)	50.8 (2.00)	58.4 (2.30)	53.3 (2.10)	48.3 (1.90)	40.6 (1.60)	38.1 (1.50)	27.9 (1.10)	17.8 (0.70)	444.4 (17.50)
Average precipitation days	1	1	3	3	4	4	4	3	3	2	2	1	31
Average relative humidity (%)	77	79	83	84	81	80	80	82	81	79	79	77	80
Source 1: Sistema de Clasificación Bioclimática Mundial (precipitation and humidity 1961–1990) Starlings Roost Weather
Source 2: Weatherbase

== Shipping hazards ==
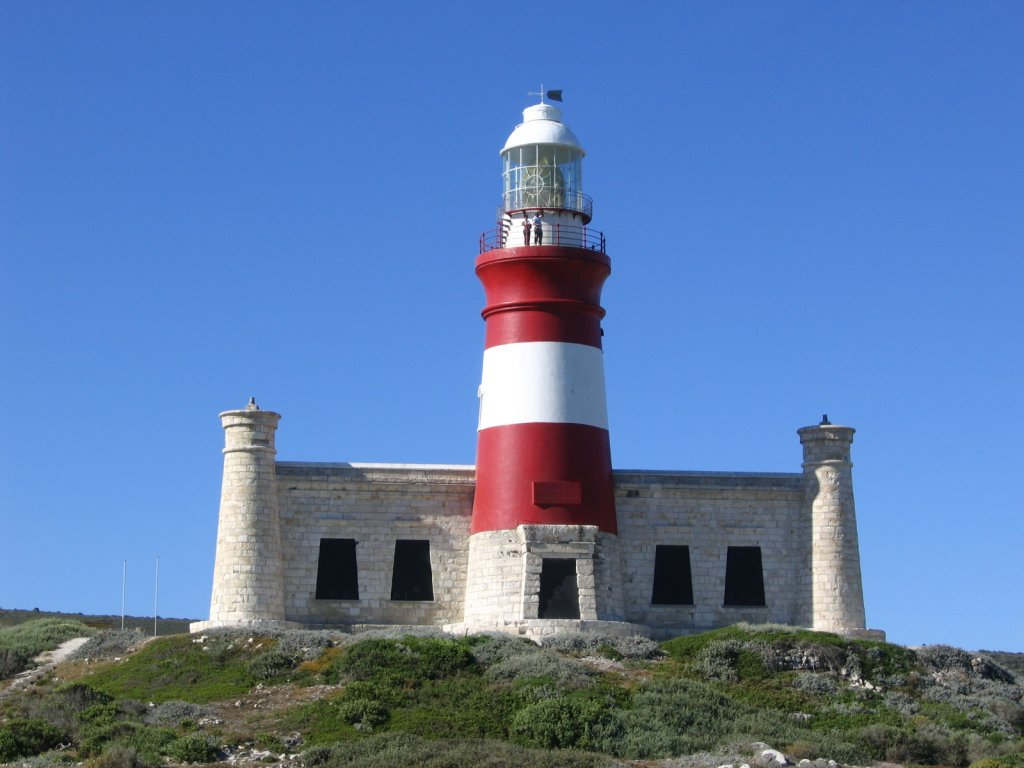
The lighthouse at Cape Agulhas has guided many ships around the cape over the years.

The sea off Cape Agulhas is notorious for winter storms and significant rogue waves which can range up to 30 metres (100 ft) high and can sink even large ships. Over the past few hundred years, it has been believed that around 150 ships have sunk around Agulhas. These conditions are caused by a number of factors. The naturally strong winds of the Roaring Forties, which blow from west to east, and the cold Antarctic Circumpolar Current flowing in the same direction, come up against the warmer Agulhas Current in the region of the cape. These conflicting currents of water of different densities, and the west winds blowing against the Agulhas Current, can create extremely hazardous wave conditions; these are further exacerbated by the shallow waters of the Agulhas Bank, a broad, shallow part of the continental shelf which extends up to 250 kilometres (155 mi) south from the cape, after which it falls steeply away to the abyssal plain.

These hazards have combined to make the cape notorious among sailors. The coast here is littered with wrecks: Arniston (1815), Geortyrder (1849), Elise (1879), Cooranga (1964), Gwendola (1968), Federal Lakes (1975), and Gouritz (1981), but these are just a few of the vessels lost in the proximity of the "Cape of Needles". Owing to the hazards and following the loss of several vessels, notably the Arniston, a lighthouse was built in 1848. The lighthouse now plays host to a museum and a small rustic restaurant.

== See also ==
- Agulhas National Park
- Cape Agulhas Lighthouse
- Cape Angela, the northernmost point of Africa.
- SS Wafra oil spill
