= Elim, Western Cape =

Elim
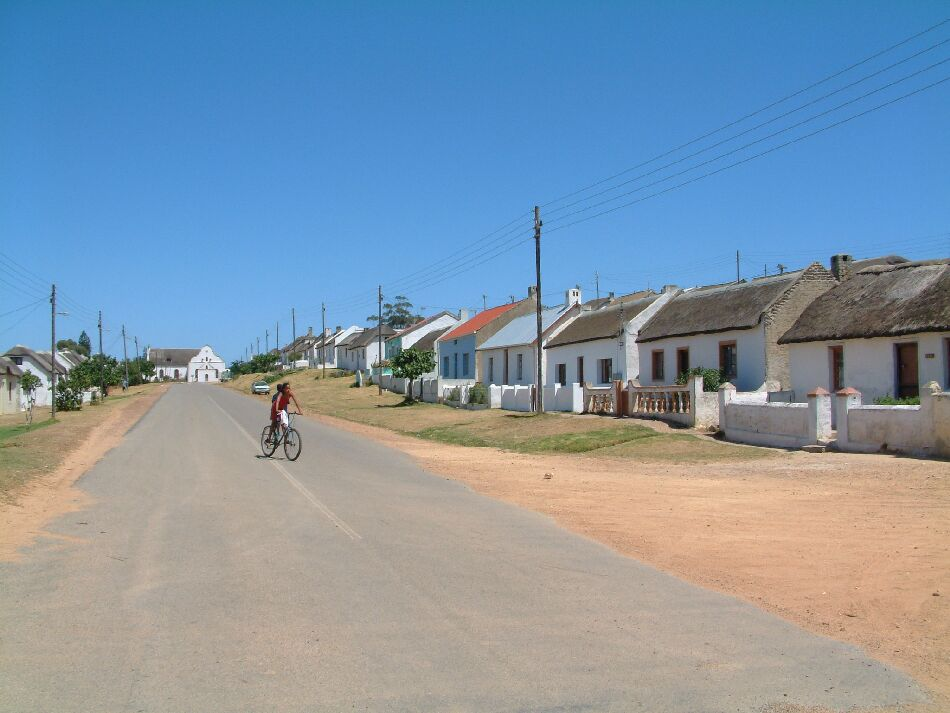
- Street in Elim

- Location within Western Cape Location within South Africa
- Coordinates: 34°35′30″S 19°45′30″E
- Country: South Africa
- Province: Western Cape
- District: Overberg
- Municipality: Cape Agulhas

Area
  - Total: 28.33 km^{2} (10.94 sq mi)

Population (2011)
  - Total: 1,412
  - Density: 49.84/km^{2} (129.1/sq mi)

Racial makeup (2011)
  - Coloured: 91.6%
  - Black African: 7.4%
  - White: 1.0%

First languages (2011)
  - Afrikaans: 94.1%
  - English: 3.6%
  - Other: 2.3%
- Time zone: UTC+2 (SAST)
- Postal code (street): 7284
- PO box: 7284

Elim is a village on the Agulhas Plain in the Western Cape of South Africa. It was established in August 1824 by German missionaries as a Moravian mission station. When selecting the location, the missionaries placed a high priority on the proximity of water and on terrain that was suitable for planting vines so that wine for communion could be produced. As well as preaching the Gospel, the missionaries taught the villagers a variety of trades and skills. Elim's thatchers continue to be renowned for their craftsmanship.

The village is picturesque and has changed little over the years. It is filled with whitewashed cottages, fruit trees and fynbos. All the roads in the village lead to the thatch-roofed church. The community, still mainly Moravian, consists of farmers, farm workers and artisans.

Elim is becoming known for the export of fynbos, and as an emerging area in the production of wine.
