= Old Parsonage Museum, Fraserburg =

Coordinates: 31.9140°S 21.5124°E

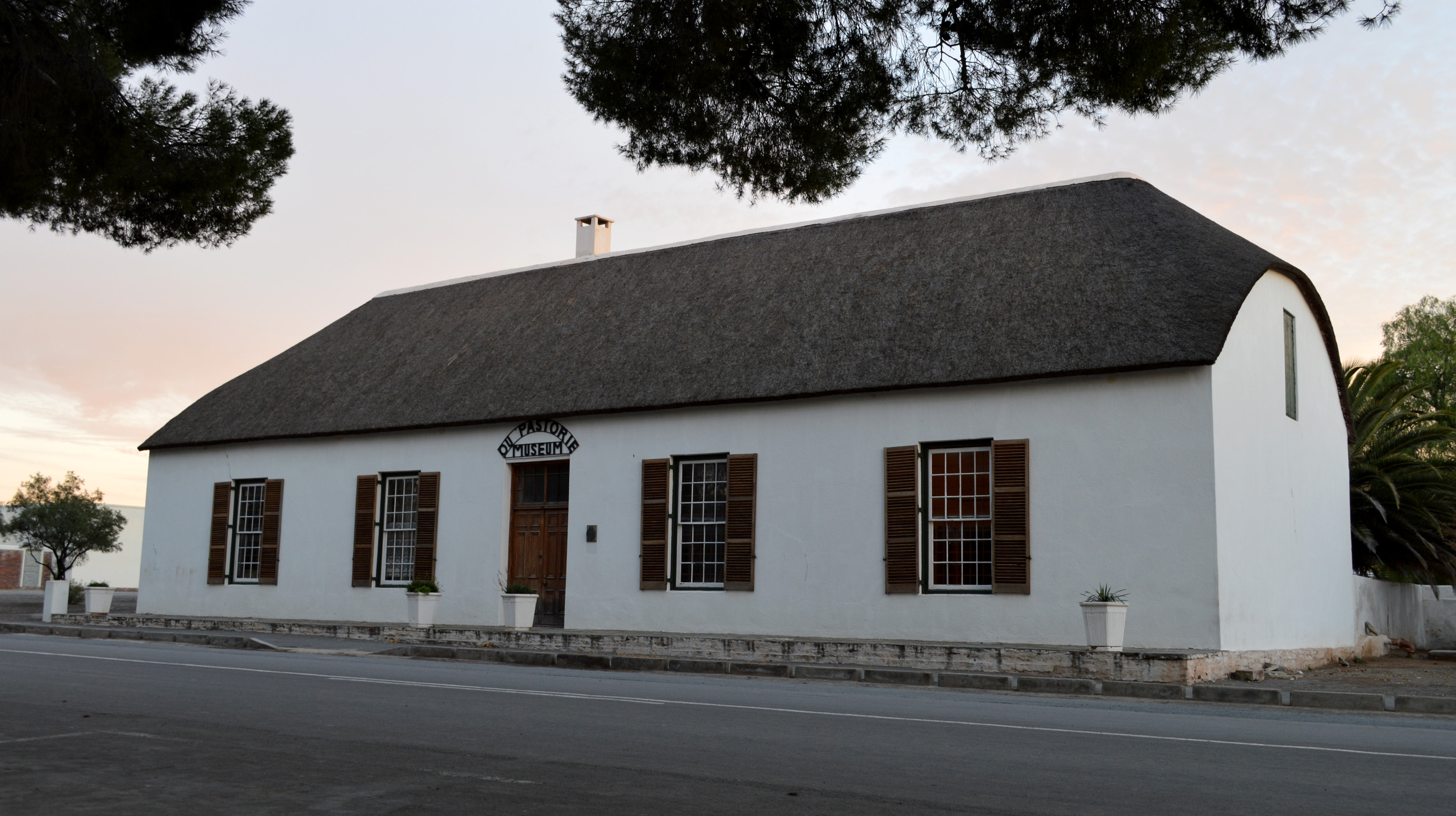
The Old Parsonage Museum.

The Old Parsonage Museum in Fraserburg is the first parsonage that the Fraserburg Reformed Church, the local congregation of the Dutch Reformed Church in South Africa (NGK), built for its pastor, five years after the congregation's founding in 1851. It has for many years housed the local museum and is one of three national heritage sites in the Karoo town. Its restoration around 1979 was the largest of several projects in the region carried out around that time, including that of the Peperbus, a former Anglican church and gunpowder magazine.

The building was completed at the beginning of 1856 by Henry Burnett. The plan was approved by the church council, but the Rev. Carl Arnoldus Bamberger (invested here in 1854) had a major role in the design, including metric rather than English-measured doors.

During the planning of the restoration, research in the Cape Church archives and other local sources uncovered much information about the building's history.

== Design ==
The church council rejected a plan for a gabled house - similar to those found in Prince Albert today - in favor of a more "modern" Plan using wolf ends instead. The facade includes a front door with a fanlight and four sash windows. A small entryway leads to two lobbies and a dining room with curved walls vaguely reminiscent of Baroque architecture.

The kitchen, servant quarters, and stable are housed in a back wing, giving the building an L-shape. The wings were two rooms wide. At the side and back are swinging tails, each with 15 windows built in the Cape Dutch style, one that had become obsolete around 1815 in the Boland but remained in use in other regions until the end of the 19th century.

Although the council opted for a modern style, the building has a medieval character in many ways. The pioneers of the veld had lived in seclusion from Europe, and thus their conservatism preserved architectural traditions that had disappeared elsewhere. Despite medieval elements, it cannot be said to be a Gothic house. In fact, the only Gothic Revival detail is the dining room fireplace decoration, probably made by the elders. The wolf ends are more reminiscent of a Dutch hallehuis (free-standing barn) of the High Middle Ages.

The use of thick solder beams with broad boards is a tradition Cape houses of the 18th century brought from earlier times in Europe. The hinge work on many doors, windows, and shutters is almost identical to that in 15th-century northern Germany. The open hearth is another typical Cape throwback to old European tradition. A stable under the same roof as the living space, unheard of by then in the Boland, occurs in the Old Parsonage. The walls above the swinging tails and the side and back doors are notably unlatched. On the contrary, flat arches were mingled, a common late Gothic feature. The total absence of Neo-Classical decoration on the exterior further gives the building medieval qualities. Baroque and Neo-Classical influence can also be shown, however, in the symmetrical facade and geometric positioning of the windows vis-a-vis the front door.

The curved walls of the rooms by the front door can best be explained by the Rev. Bamberger's love of the Baroque. The interior doors in the front wing have six panels each, and the frames are enclosed with wooden arches in the Neo-Classical style. Although the dining room patio door doesn't line up with the front door, the garden gate was built right opposite it. Despite the disparate influences, the house was unmistakably Cape Dutch with its thatched roof, white walls, white frame, and green shutters. By its dimensions, it could even be considered a large house.

== Use and changes ==
Over the years, the building has been drastically altered. In 1877, a veranda was built over the front porch, and a new stable was built in the back yard. The old stable was divided into a shed and a barn, requiring the barn door to be moved a meter to the right.

Since the thatched roof was becoming full of holes, architect Carl Otto Hager, who also designed the second NGK church in town, installed a corrugated iron roof in 1892. The walls were also raised by about a meter to allow ventilation holes. Some swinging tails on the back and sides were replaced with large sash windows. A flat-roofed study was built to the right of the main structure in 1895.

The porch veranda was renovated in 1948, and in the 1950s, large steel windows were installed in the old shed to make it a sunroom. Collectively, the changes made the house unrecognizable from what it was a century earlier.

The house underwent less changes on the interior. The ceiling beams in the front wing were nailed with small boards in 1911. The kitchen hearth was removed and one of the rooms was set up as a bathroom with a cement floor.

The Old Parsonage was often threatened with demolition. When a new parsonage was planned in 1959, many wanted it built on the old one's grounds. After the new parsonage opened elsewhere, the church council indeed decided to tear down the old building, but there were fortunately willing tenants.

== Restoration ==
In 1974, planning began for the "restoration" of the Old Parsonage. This would entail, among other things, the outfitting of several rooms with yellow wood floors, the replacement of several windows with ones of different dimensions, and the building of a Cape Dutch arbor over the front porch. The building's rescue from such alteration was only secured in November 1974, when the Museum Committee secured permission of other local organizations (since 1978, a Museum Union has taken the place of the committee).

The committee was able to stop the ill-advised "restoration plan" of the church council and began building a town museum. For four years, the committee struggled to raise money, obtain exhibits, and secure recognition from the provincial government. Unable to gain such recognition, they decided at the end of 1978 to begin construction and get recognition afterwards. A renowned Cape Town architect raised in Fraserburg kindly drew up a blueprint.

Since the Museum Union's funds were scanty, at first only urgent needs could be addressed. Later additions were removed by the local Rotary Club, plaster was replaced on the exterior and in three rooms, swinging tails in the old style replaced the steel windows, the kitchen hearth was rebuilt, square-cut stone was restored to the porch, and the garden gate was rebuilt according to the residents' memories. The work began in April 1979.

There was just enough money to pay for the above work, and instead of donating money, well-wishers were asked to donate building materials. Luckily, a Cape Couloured builder with much knowledge of old construction methods and materials strove to make all the new work authentic. Without his expertise, the kitchen hearth would have been impossible to restore.

Shortly after work began, the municipal government invested R5,000. With that, the roof could be replaced. To save money, a pair of farmers volunteered to truck in beams from Great Brak River and thatch from Stilbaai. Over four weeks, a great many volunteers under the direction of the pastor, Dr. Adelbert Scholtz (a member of the Simon van der Stel Foundation and chairman of the Museum Union), worked together to dismantle the corrugated iron roof and restore the thatch. The dimensions of the old wolf ends were very carefully measured.

Afterwards, a Monsignor Afrika van Elim finished the deck work in two weeks. Thus the building was restored to its original appearance.

Before the work began, there were several criticisms of the Museum Union plan. After completion, almost all the community approved, since after all most of them were involved in one way or another. Many museum pieces were donated. Along with the existing collection, they created a comprehensive overview of the pastoralist's life, past and present.

The National Monuments Council (South Africa and Namibia) took it upon themselves to designate the Old Parsonage as a heritage site. After the Museum Union finances reached suitable levels, the following projects were undertaken: the replacement of a pair of 1892 windows with older types, the removal of the ceiling boards from 1911, the commissioning of 1857-era wallpaper, and the reconstruction of the backyard stable from 1877. A mule still had to be housed somewhere, and a kliprondawel (corbel hut - a kind of building unique to the region) needed planning, but only the latter was eventually built.

== Sources ==
- (af) Scholtz, Dr. Adelbert in Restorica, Stigting Simon van der Stel, 1979:1.
- (af) Kotzé, D.A. 1951. Die Gemeente Fraserburg. 'n Eeufees-gedenkboek (1851–1951). Fraserburg: NG Kerkraad.
- (af) Olivier, the Rev. P.L. 1952. Ons gemeentelike feesalbum. Cape Town/Pretoria: N.G. Kerk-uitgewers.
