= Peperbus =

Building in Fraserburg, Northern Cape, South Africa

Coordinates: 31°54′48″S 21°30′45″E

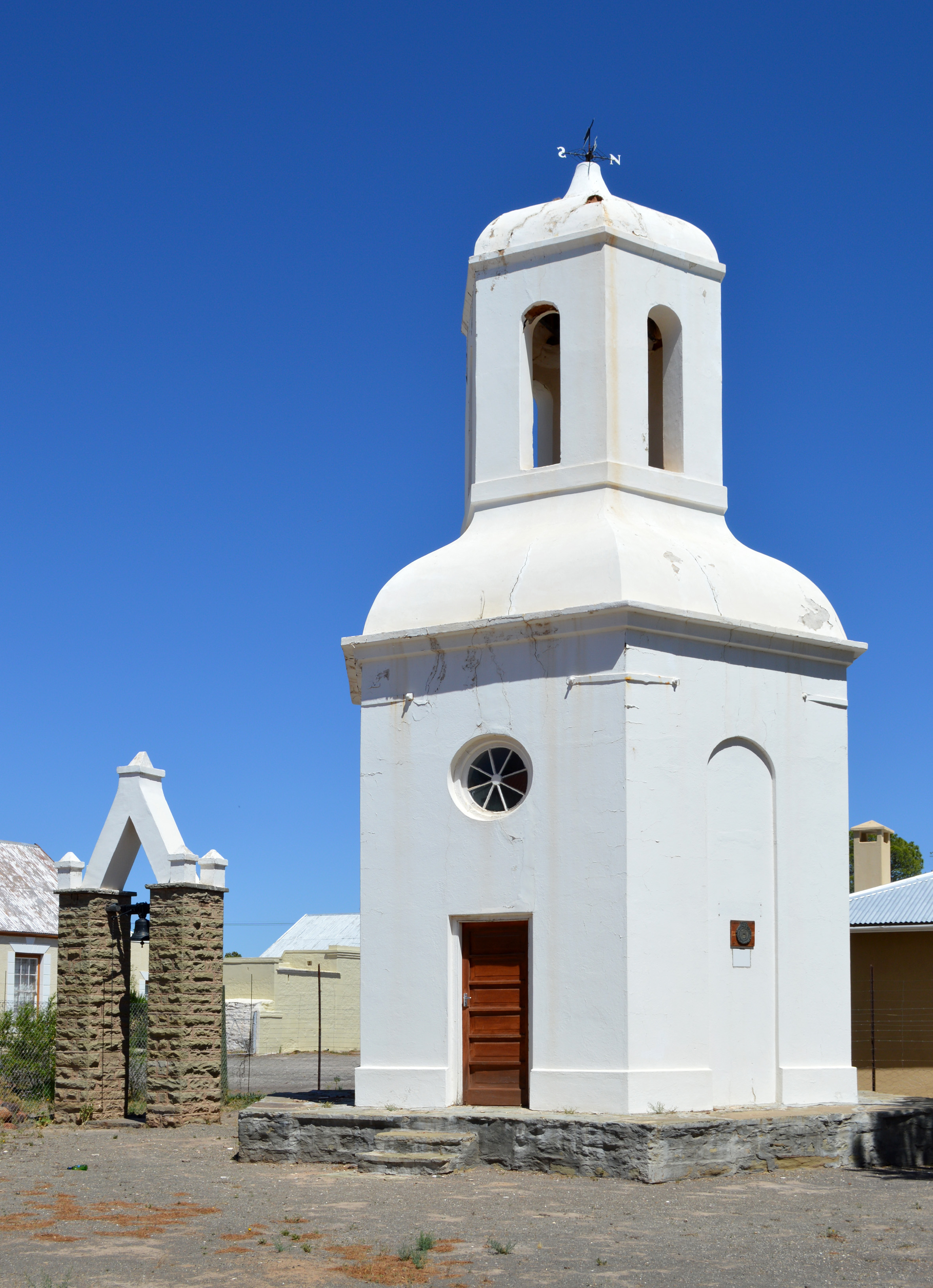
The Peperbus in Fraserburg.

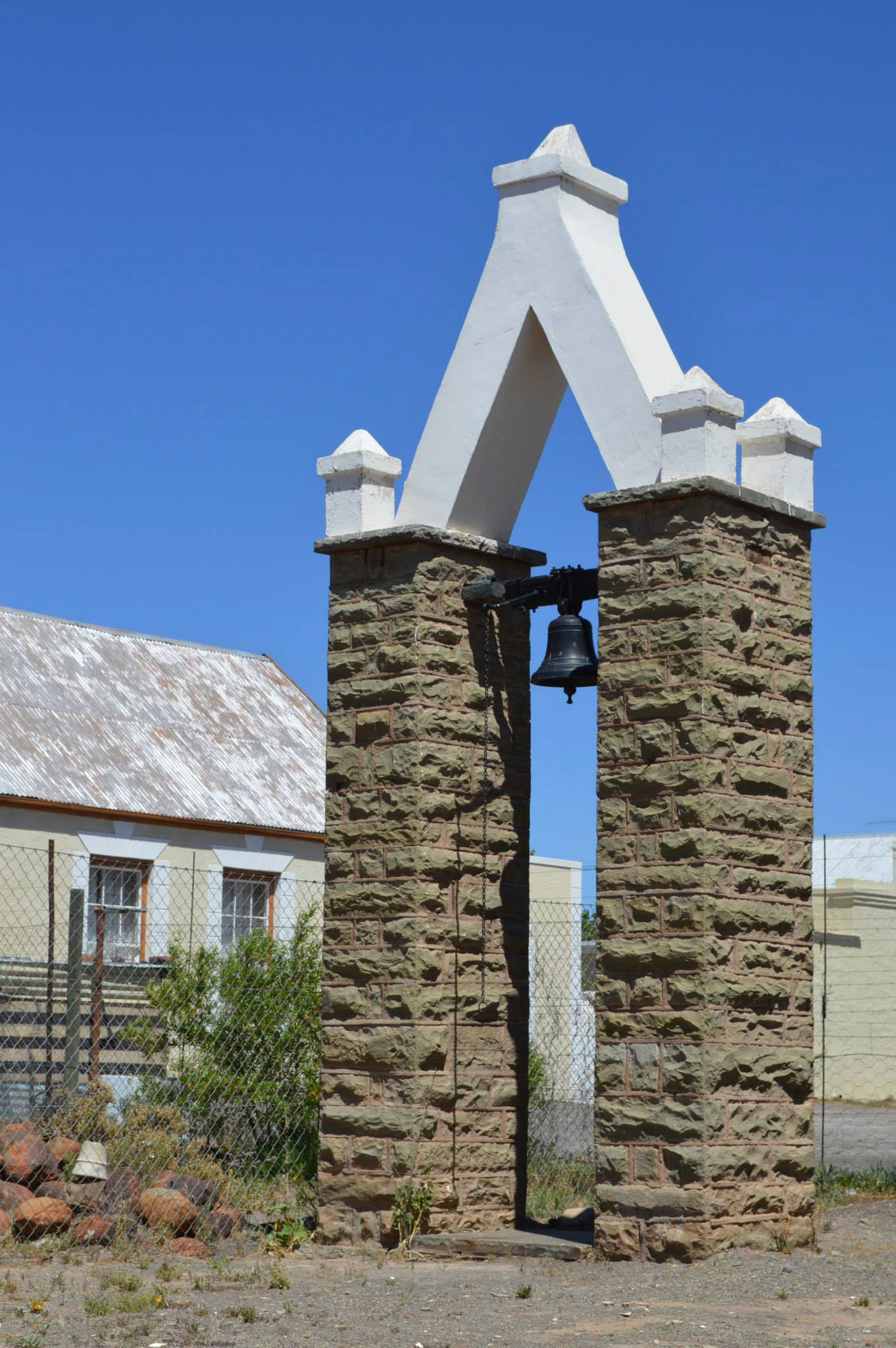
The bell tower near the Peperbus.

The Peperbus (Afrikaans for "pepper pot") was an unusual, hexagonal building on Meyburgh Street, Fraserburg, in the Karoo of South Africa. Along with the Old Parsonage Museum and the Afrikaner Protestant church, earlier an Anglican church designed by Sophy Gray, the Peperbus was one of three national heritage sites the province used to maintain in the town, until it collapsed on 26 September 2026.

A Baster, Adam Jacobs, built the Peperbus in 1861 according to plans drawn up by the Rev. Carl Arnoldus Bamberger, first pastor of the Fraserburg Reformed Church. D.A. Scholtz described it as a shack resembling an 18th-century Baroque pavilion with its curved lines and geometric design. A line drawing holds the building as 10 m from foundation to ceiling, but the building itself is around 8 m. It was originally intended to be the market house, whose bell would open the market. The local market gradually declined in importance, but the Peperbus went on to serve as the town's first library and an office or study for the magistrate, the town clerk, and the curate. It became a municipal election site and provided a place for the AACV to store their hospital furniture. Around 1951, it was the school board office. In the 1960s, the city council established a committee to promote the building as a museum, but it remained vacant for many years. Long-needed restoration work began in April 2016, but the increasingly deteriorated building collapsed on 26 September 2026.

== Description by D.A. Kotzé (1951) ==
At the centennial celebration of the Fraserburg Reformed Church in 1951, D.A. Kotzé said of the Peperbus:

A description of Fraserburg will...not achieve its purpose without an account of its most typical feature, namely the Peperbus. No more complete is Pisa without its Leaning Tower, Egypt without its Sphinx, or Babel without its Tower, than Fraserburg without its Peperbus."

To the passing outsider, the structure seems to be of little note, but the attentive visitor with an eye for the unusual can find much of interest that later draws them in. The Peperbus is a hexagonal stone building, around 28 feet high. It stands in the middle of town in the marketplace on a widened stone foundation. Opposite the door lies a sliding window. Just above the big door is the strikingly large cockpit window 2.5 m in diameter with its six equally large glass panes.

The hexagonal walls gradually taper in turn to a hexagonal dome and a hexagonal tower. The tower features a long, small window of about 3.5 by 1.5 ft on each side. It is arched at the top. A weather vane lies at the top. The foundation, walls, dome, tower, and black-and-white weathercock make a beautiful contrast to the blue background of the Karoo sky.

In earlier times, there was a large bell in the tower. The beam it hung on can still be seen today. The bell now hangs between two pillars next to the Peperbus. The Peperbus was designed by the Rev. Bamberger (Fraserburg's first NGK pastor.

The Peperbus bell served as an evening bell at 9:00, marking the curfew after which Cape Coloreds were no longer allowed on the streets. When the constables ceased to enforce this law, the bell was hung by the building's side. Though the legislation had become a dead letter, the bell continues to ring at the same time each night. If it stops being run, something seriously wrong will have arisen with regards to our respect for our heritage.

Some years ago, there was some talk of demolishing the Peperbus because it was too difficult to repair. After fierce blowback from the community, the City Council agreed to leave the Peperbus alone but to provide electric night lighting to dissuade vandalism. Such wisdom deserves apt praise. And may the Peperbus bell sound out through the centuries the purest sounds and predict, like the healthy beat of a man's heart, a long future of fertile prospects for Fraserburg.

== Sources ==
- (af) Kotzé, D.A. 1951. Die Gemeente Fraserburg. 'n Eeufees-gedenkboek (1851–1951). Fraserburg: NG Kerkraad.
- (af) Olivier, the Rev. P.L. 1952. Ons gemeentelike feesalbum. Cape Town/Pretoria: N.G. Kerk-uitgewers.
