= Karoo Hoogland Local Municipality elections =

The Karoo Hoogland Local Municipality council consists of eleven members elected by mixed-member proportional representation. Six councillors are elected by first-past-the-post voting in six wards, while the remaining five are chosen from party lists so that the total number of party representatives is proportional to the number of votes received. In the election of 1 November 2021 the African National Congress (ANC) lost its majority, but remained the largest party, with five seats.

== Results ==
The following table shows the composition of the council after past elections.

Event	ANC	COPE	DA	Other	Total
2000 election	4	—	3	0	7
2006 election	4	—	2	1	7
2011 election	3	2	2	0	7
2016 election	4	1	2	0	7
2021 election	5	0	3	3	11

== December 2000 election ==
The following table shows the results of the 2000 election.

Party	Ward			List			Total seats
Party	Votes	%	Seats	Votes	%	Seats	Total seats
Democratic Alliance	2,461	59.07	2	2,497	59.71	2	4
African National Congress	1,584	38.02	2	1,685	40.29	1	3
Independent candidates	121	2.90	0				0
Total	4,166	100.00	4	4,182	100.00	3	7
Valid votes	4,166	97.61		4,182	97.99		
Invalid/blank votes	102	2.39		86	2.01		
Total votes	4,268	100.00		4,268	100.00		
Registered voters/turnout	5,630	75.81		5,630	75.81		

== March 2006 election ==
The following table shows the results of the 2006 election.

Party	Ward			List			Total seats
Party	Votes	%	Seats	Votes	%	Seats	Total seats
African National Congress	2,205	61.64	3	2,183	61.18	1	4
Democratic Alliance	982	27.45	1	985	27.61	1	2
African Christian Democratic Party	308	8.61	0	294	8.24	1	1
Inkatha Freedom Party	82	2.29	0	106	2.97	0	0
Total	3,577	100.00	4	3,568	100.00	3	7
Valid votes	3,577	98.65		3,568	98.40		
Invalid/blank votes	49	1.35		58	1.60		
Total votes	3,626	100.00		3,626	100.00		
Registered voters/turnout	6,484	55.92		6,484	55.92		

== May 2011 election ==
The following table shows the results of the 2011 election.

Party	Ward			List			Total seats
Party	Votes	%	Seats	Votes	%	Seats	Total seats
African National Congress	2,187	44.97	2	2,205	45.45	1	3
Congress of the People	1,523	31.32	1	1,485	30.61	1	2
Democratic Alliance	1,006	20.69	1	1,027	21.17	1	2
African Christian Democratic Party	147	3.02	0	134	2.76	0	0
Total	4,863	100.00	4	4,851	100.00	3	7
Valid votes	4,863	99.02		4,851	98.80		
Invalid/blank votes	48	0.98		59	1.20		
Total votes	4,911	100.00		4,910	100.00		
Registered voters/turnout	6,799	72.23		6,799	72.22		

== August 2016 election ==
The following table shows the results of the 2016 election.

Party	Ward			List			Total seats
Party	Votes	%	Seats	Votes	%	Seats	Total seats
African National Congress	2,401	54.11	3	2,429	54.72	1	4
Democratic Alliance	1,340	30.20	1	1,441	32.46	1	2
Congress of the People	323	7.28	0	332	7.48	1	1
Freedom Front Plus	113	2.55	0	124	2.79	0	0
Economic Freedom Fighters	84	1.89	0	82	1.85	0	0
Independent candidates	164	3.70	0				0
Civic Independent	12	0.27	0	31	0.70	0	0
Total	4,437	100.00	4	4,439	100.00	3	7
Valid votes	4,437	98.43		4,439	98.40		
Invalid/blank votes	71	1.57		72	1.60		
Total votes	4,508	100.00		4,511	100.00		
Registered voters/turnout	7,235	62.31		7,235	62.35		

== November 2021 election ==
The following table shows the results of the 2021 election.

Party	Ward			List			Total seats
Party	Votes	%	Seats	Votes	%	Seats	Total seats
African National Congress	1,815	41.12	3	1,803	40.55	2	5
Democratic Alliance	1,337	30.29	3	1,335	30.03	0	3
Patriotic Alliance	962	21.79	0	994	22.36	2	2
Freedom Front Plus	229	5.19	0	225	5.06	1	1
Congress of the People	42	0.95	0	60	1.35	0	0
Economic Freedom Fighters	29	0.66	0	29	0.65	0	0
Total	4,414	100.00	6	4,446	100.00	5	11
Valid votes	4,414	98.57		4,446	98.73		
Invalid/blank votes	64	1.43		57	1.27		
Total votes	4,478	100.00		4,503	100.00		
Registered voters/turnout	7,250	61.77		7,250	62.11		

=== By-elections from November 2021 ===
The following by-elections were held to fill vacant ward seats in the period from the election in November 2021.

Date	Ward	Party of the previous councillor	Party of the newly elected councillor
4 Dec 2024	1	Democratic Alliance	African National Congress
28 May 2025	4	African National Congress	Patriotic Alliance

The African National Congress (ANC) gained a majority in the council following its by-election victory over the Democratic Alliance on 4 December 2024. It lost its majority in May 2025 following the defection of an ANC councillor to the Patriotic Alliance (PA), triggering a by-election where the candidate retained her seat, this time representing the PA.

The council subsequently elected a PA mayor and FF+ speaker, with the support of the DA.
