= Amphiglossa corrudaefolia =

Scientific classification
- Kingdom: Plantae
- Clade: Tracheophytes
- Clade: Angiosperms
- Clade: Eudicots
- Clade: Asterids
- Order: Asterales
- Family: Asteraceae
- Genus: Amphiglossa
- Species: A. corrudaefolia

Binomial name
- Amphiglossa corrudaefolia DC.

South African plant species

Amphiglossa corrudaefolia is a species of plant from South Africa.

== Description ==
=== Growth form ===
This erect, rhizomatous shrub grows up to 0.4 m (1.3 ft) tall. Roots grow from trailing branches and many short shoots. The branches are rigid and have a diameter of up to 4 mm (0.16 in). Secondary branches develop on the leaf axils on the main stem and have a diameter of up to 2 mm (0.079 in). Brachyblasts (shoots) grow in the leaf axils of the secondary branches. These typically grow up to 5 mm (0.20 in) long and secondary brachyblasts are rare. They are white when young.

=== Leaves ===
The triangular leaves grow closely against the branches and are woolly on the upper surface. They are bright green and are slightly inrolled. The leaves growing on the secondary branches are about half the size of those growing on the main stems.

=== Flowers ===
The white radiate flowers are present between January and April. They have four or five ray florets and a eual number of disc florets. Only one flower head is found at the tip of a branch. They grow on short shoots. The outermost of the surrounding bracts are green around the midrib and translucent towards the tips. The innermost bracts are the largest at about twice the length of the outermost bracts and have rough hairs along the margins. The upper half is transparent.

The ray florets are white in colour and are female. The tips have between one and three lobes.

The disc florets are white and bisexual. They are often tinged pink below the lobes. There are five lobes and these are often asymmetrical.

=== Fruit and seeds ===
The fruits a-re cypselas. They are about 1 mm (0.039 in), greyish and inconspicuously ribbed. They develop in three to five of the florets, most commonly in the ray florets. They have 18-25 pappus bristles.

== Distribution and habitat ==
This species in endemic to South Africa. It grows at Loeriesfontein in the Northern Cape and Prince Albert in the Western Cape. It prefers growing in sandy riverbeds.

== Ecology ==
Older plants become well anchored in the soil. The rhizomes produce many shoots if they get covered by sand when the river that they are growing at floods.

== Conservation ==
Amphiglossa corrudeafolia is classified as vulnerable by the South African National Biodiversity Institute as it is potentially threatened by seasonal flash floods.
