= Dutch Reformed Church, Prince Albert =

Church in Prince Albert, South Africa

Dutch Reformed Church
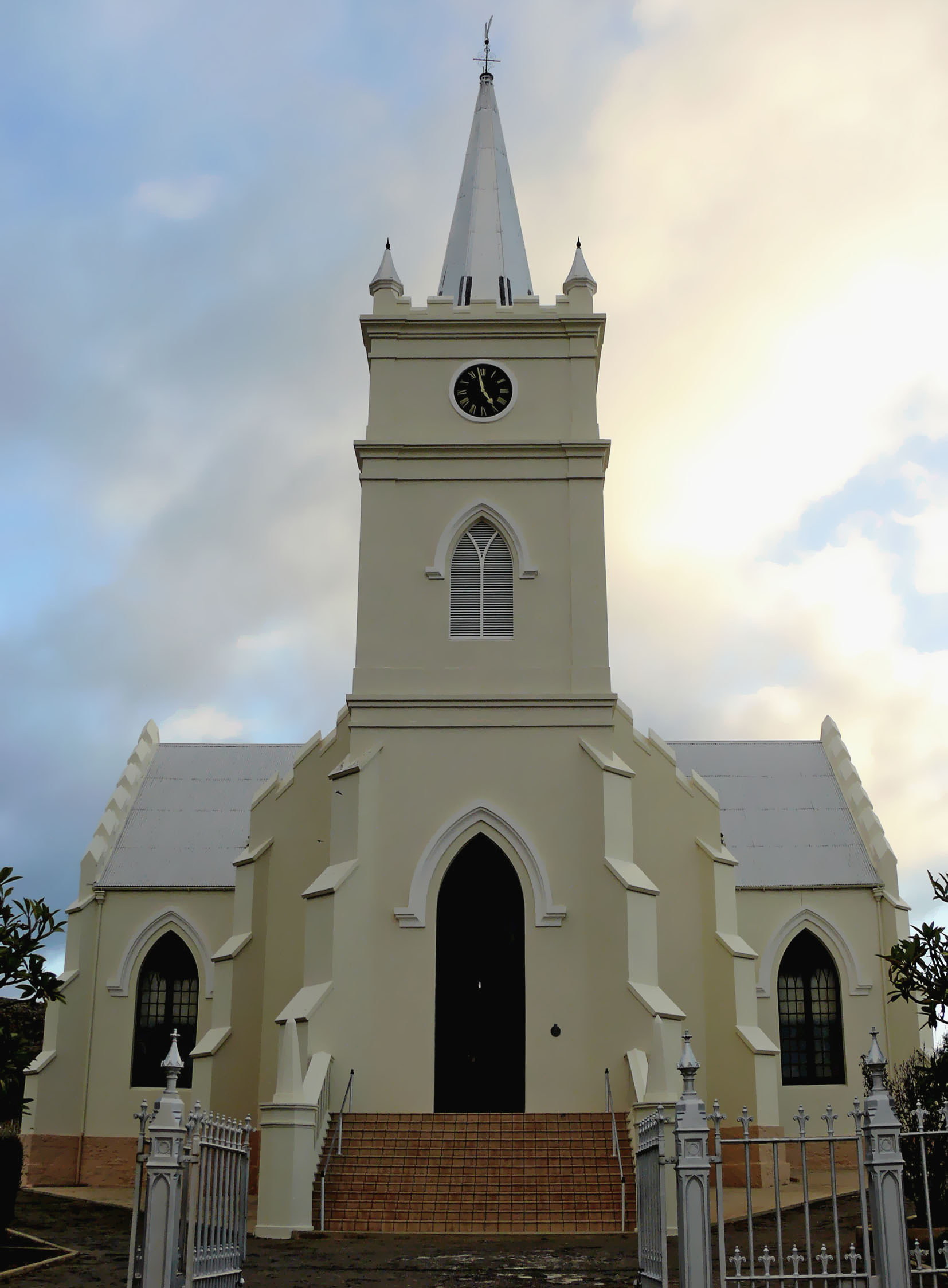
- Location: Prince Albert
- Country: South Africa
- Denomination: Nederduits Gereformeerde Kerk

History
- Founded: 1842

Architecture
- Functional status: Church

The Dutch Reformed Church in Prince Albert is a congregation of the Dutch Reformed Church that was separated from the NG congregation Beaufort West on 24 November 1842 as the 19th congregation in what is currently the Synod of the Western and Southern Cape and only the 29th congregation in the entire Church.

== Background ==
Towards the end of the 18th century, Samuel de Beer established a fertile farm at the foot of the Swartberg Mountains. This farm, Kweekvallei, was one of the ten field cornets that were subject to Beaufort West, and was also on the old main road between Cape Town and the eastern border. With Kweekvallei as its centre, a congregation was established by the first Synod of the Cape Church of Beaufort West on 24 November 1842. The congregation and the emerging town were named after Prince Albert, husband of Queen Victoria.

== Ministers ==
- Johannes Henoch Neethling, 1852–1858
- Willem Adolph Krige, 1859–1883 (emeritus; died 28 June 1884)
- Adriaan Hofmeyr, 1883–1895
- Philip Rudolf McLachlan, 1892 (assistant preacher)
- Andreas Gerhardus du Toit, 1896 to 1906
- David Wilcocks, 1906–1911
- Daniël J. Le Roux Marchand, 1911–1928 (emeritus; died 25 April 1935)
- Johannes Stefanus Theron, 1929–1932
- Hendrik Schalk Theron, 1933–1936
- Lourens Erasmus du Toit, 1937–1943
- Ruben Fourie, 1939–1944
- Unio Joubert, 1943–1947
- Stephanus Bernardus Buys, February 1948 – January 1962 (died 12 January 1962)
- Wilhelm Adolph Alheit, 1949–1951
- Ernst Jacobus Marais 1952-1955
- Melgard Johannes Keller, 1962-1968
- Charl Francois Sieberhagen 1968-1972
- Koosie Delport, 1972–1977
- Johannes Jochemus Gildenhuys, 1977–1981
- Matthys Magielse Coetzee, 1981-1996
- Christoffel Jacobus Briers, 1996-2020
- Philip George Scholtz, 2 April 2021 – present (three-year term; emeritus minister)
