= Amphiglossa =

Scientific classification
- Kingdom: Plantae
- Clade: Embryophytes
- Clade: Tracheophytes
- Clade: Angiosperms
- Clade: Eudicots
- Clade: Asterids
- Order: Asterales
- Family: Asteraceae
- Subfamily: Asteroideae
- Tribe: Gnaphalieae
- Genus: Amphiglossa; DC.

Genus of flowering plants

Amphiglossa is a genus of flowering plants in the family Asteraceae, described as a genus in 1838. It includes ten species native to Namibia and the Cape Provinces of South Africa.

- Amphiglossa callunoides DC. - Cape Provinces
- Amphiglossa celans Koek. - Cape Provinces
- Amphiglossa corrudaefolia DC. - Cape Provinces
- Amphiglossa foliosa J.C.Manning & Helme – Cape Provinces
- Amphiglossa grisea Koek. - Cape Provinces
- Amphiglossa rudolphii Koek. - Cape Provinces
- Amphiglossa susannae Koek. - Cape Provinces
- Amphiglossa tecta (Brusse) Koek. - Cape Provinces
- Amphiglossa tomentosa (Thunb.) Harv. - Namibia and Cape Provinces
