= P. D. Rossouw =

South African priest and literary figure

The Rev. Pieter Daniel Rossouw (Cape Town, 17 October 1845 – Fraserburg, 11 October 1896) was a pastor of the Dutch Reformed Church in South Africa (NGK) and an early writer in the Afrikaans language.

The literary professor P.J. Nienaber called him "one of the first poets and writers in Afrikaans and an advocate for Afrikaans at a time when the Church was generally very hostile to the ‘kitchen language’." Nienaber wrote that "at the time, it took courage for a minister to speak openly in favor of Afrikaans, and especially to write in Afrikaans. But the Rev. Rossouw went even further than a pastor in those days could in that he wrote the first sermons in Afrikaans in the controversial Die Afrikaanse Patriot, entitled Evangeli in di Volkstaal." L.B. Odendeel wrote in the Suid-Afrikaanse Biografiese Woordeboek, vol. III, that Rossouw’s "most important contribution to the Afrikaans Language Movement lies in his clerical writing, though his poetry is undoubtedly significant." John Christoffel Kannemeyer described him in Die Afrikaanse literatuur 1652–2004 as follows: "Pieter Daniel Rossouw (1845–1896) is best-remembered today for his satirical poem 'Stellaland,' a poem mocking John MacKenzie’s dissolution of the Boer republic of Stellaland (in what is now Botswana) to create British Bechuanaland through repetition of the three rhyming syllables in Mackenzie's name in each sentence."

== Background and childhood ==
Daniël Pieter Rossouw was young when his father died, and then his mother moved from Cape Town to Burgersdorp, where he worked in a store to support her in her old age. Enrolled at the local Albert Academy, he gained the attention of the headmaster, Dr. John Brebner, a popular figure among the local youth. Dr. Brebner sent the gifted youth to the South African College in Cape Town, where he struggled financially, and later to the NGK Kweekskool (theological seminary) in Stellenbosch. The Rev. Rossouw later told of how he rented a small room and studied by a whale oil lamp, working odd jobs over the holidays to fund his studies; though better off financially in Stellenbosch, he still lived sparingly.

On 12 March 1869 he completed his theological studies and was ordained in the church, though it is not recorded where. That July, he began preaching in Uniondale and thus gaining fame.

== In Uniondale ==
He married Sophia Agnes Johanna Human, daughter of Jurgen Johannes Human. One son, Pierre Daniel Roussow, served as a school inspector, while a grandson, Dr. Pierre Etienne Rousseau, ran the state enterprise in Sasolburg. The Rev. Roussow arrived in Uniondale on 21 January 1870, and was ordained the next day by the Rev. J.G.J. Horak of Mossel Bay. The Rev. Kuys would have received him but was ill, but the Rev. M.C. Botha of Knysna and the Rev. George Murray of Willowmore were in attendance, as was the Rev. Dower of the local Independent Mission Church. The Rev. Horak, then the consulent or acting pastor, chaired a special church council meeting the following Saturday evening to hand over his duties to its first official Reverend, and following the latter’s thanks adjourned until the next Monday morning at five o’clock. The meeting notes state "on Monday morning, the entire church council came together again."

The most pressing issue for the council was the matter of a parsonage. A committee on the matter decided to wait for the pastor’s arrival to consult with him, but a Mr. F. Taute of Molenrivier Farm donated a house and land for the purpose for £550. The council rejected the offer and decided to rent one for the time being, given the treasurer-deacon’s report of a £25 shortage beyond the £300 debt on the Lyon land purchase. The town of Uniondale had been founded in 1856, when the owners of each of the two parts of Rietvallei farm, Mr. James Stewart and Mr. A.L. du Preez, each founded their own villages, Hopedale and Lyon respectively. The neighbors disagreed until they wrote to the NGK George Ring (sub-synod) on 24 September 1865, stating their intention to unite the two villages as Uniondale and separate their own congregation from the George Reformed Church (NGK). The Ring agreed on 19 October, and on 20 January, the Uniondale Reformed Church was founded with the Rev. A.G.M. Kuys of George as consulent.

To fund the parsonage, the council organized two sales and assigned £200 as salary for the pastor and around £50 a year for the reader-verger. When the controversial purchase of land in Lyon came to light, the Rev. Rossouw sought quick repayment. Since G.W.B. Wehmeyer was no longer a council member, deacon A.N. Smuts served in his place as deacon-treasurer, but in practice the pastor kept his own books. When Wehmeyer left, the Rev. Rossouw thanked him "for his many years of loyal service" and hoped that he would continue to assist the congregation. Three councilors, C.J. Fourie, H.J. Kritzinger, and J.H. Barnard, agreed to pay the debt, and the Rev. Rossouw (also the secretary) contracted with bondholders Barry & Neven to pay the debt and take over the churchyard. Inexperience with such transactions, the Rev. Rossouw contacted an old school friend, lawyer John Cairncross of Mossel Bay, to settle the case, which Wehmeyer saw as a motion of no confidence in his agency and past trust for business transactions.

Harsh words for Wehmeyer at a future council meeting led to a sharp exchange of letters between him and the Reverend. He demanded the public calumnies be retracted and was given the chance to meet with the council, whence they appeared to resolve things. However, tensions continued over the litigation.

Meanwhile, Cairncross continued to forward the council’s purchase payments on the plots and pass on the deeds of conveyance through his Cape Town contacts. Once all territory in Uniondale and the hamlet of Krakeel was secure, Cairncross was paid £125, including accrued interest on the purchase price. Despite all the expenses, the Rev. Rossouw reported a balance at the end of 1870. Considerable money was spent to repair a dilapidated church in Krakeel for the pastor to hold four services a year, up from two, other Sundays being handled there by the teacher and reader D.P. Terburgh since 1855. The Rev. Rossouw did not get along well with the people of Krakeel, and once the council even censured Terburgh and one of the Strydoms over their hostile behavior towards each other; ultimately, Terburgh left to work as a teacher and shopkeeper.

The reader in Uniondale, J. van der Werff, resigned to teach for the Independent church in Dysselsdorp. The council’s search for a successor started with the verger, M.P. Mostert, followed by F.W. Schmidt doing triple duty as reader, verger, and teacher. Ultimately, the young P.C. Schoonees was hired for £50 per year as reader and verger in 1872 after helping his father (Mr. L.A. Schoonees) perform these duties in Mossel Bay. P.C. and his brother L.J. both married Terburgh sisters, thus connecting the two reader dynasties in marriage.

=== First parsonage in Uniondale ===
In 1872, the question of a parsonage re-emerged as the pastor’s family continued to rent the home of pledged co-donor Stewart. After the other donor from 1865, Du Preez, went bankrupt, the council gained a few of the plots. Joined at a meeting with the council by Wehmeyer and M.P. Zondagh (who had been there for the 1865 promise), Stewart paid £15 to release his remaining obligations. He agreed, however, to sell to the council another house, the current parsonage and former home of Anglican pastor the Rev. A.A. Dorrell, for £700. The Rev. Dorrell continued to use it for services while the Anglican church was under construction in town.

Right after the parsonage’s purchase, the council began restoration. The floors were replaced with sturdy yellowwood lumber bought in Haarlem. In 1872, even the Krakeel sale raised £172, £66 more than the one in Uniondale, showing the commitment across the congregation to funding the efforts. The two bazaars raised £270 in 1875 despite the severe drought that year. By the time the Rev. Rossouw left, the parsonage was fully paid down as the congregation’s property.

=== A shocking fratricide ===
Although the local economy was growing, especially in the field of ostrich farming, the council remained concerned about morale. Council reports often expressed concern over bootlegging and other vices, and the 1874 one even reported a fratricide. A seventeen-year-old boy named Theunis J. Swart was scolded by his older brother, Hendrik, to watch the livestock that day, prompting the long-harried young man to shoot his brother in cold blood. Swart was tried in Oudtshoorn and sentenced to death, the whole affair causing great consternation in the quiet Uniondale community.

=== The Pace affair ===
Merchant Robert Pace was one of the first settlers of Lyon, and as a supporter of Wehmeyer, he contributed £10 to the pastor’s salary. In 1865, he was involved in a court case claiming other villagers had vandalized his fruit trees, heard by a judge in George who claimed that "Lyon where this happened must be a miserable place, and it is high time to put an end to such cases." Sentencing the offender to six months in jail, the judge’s decision scandalized the George council already reeling from two prominent residents’ charges of drunkenness, leading to a dispute between Pace and Elder Dannhauser that the council resolved.

At the end of 1876, Pace filed a more serious complaint against the Uniondale congregation. At the auction for the Lyon plots, the three Jewish brothers Gompert had purchased one, setting up a store there but later moving on to Kimberley upon which Pace bought them and took possession. The surveyor, Mr. Melvill, had made a serious error, marking the block T when the boundaries made it J. Pace wanted to correct the deed, but couldn't since Du Preez was in Transvaal. Since Wehmeyer had bought the "remaining extent of Lyon" for the church in 1867, however, block T-cum-J was technically church property and the council believed that Pace was squatting on it.

The June 1876 notes show the council deciding to auction off the church land in September, though they claim the above block as church property despite the Gomperts building from the 1860s: "We must also find out who has damaged the foundation on block J6, the church’s property, and bring the perpetrator to justice by an agent of the congregation." Aware of prior occupation and Pace’s objections, the council sold J6 to Deacon D.J. Swart. Pace pointed out that the corner beacons and boundary lines clearly showed the yard as the one he bought from the Gompert brothers, but the Rev. Rossouw lost his temper, ripped the map from Pace’s hands, and instructed auctioneer G. Haese to continue the sale.

According to later court testimony, Wehmeyer also explained the illegality of the sale to a council member based on firsthand knowledge of land he bought in 1860, but no settlement was possible by this point. Dr. J.A. Heese wrote in the congregation’s centennial commemorative book: "23 September 1876, was truly a fateful day in the Uniondale congregation’s history. To a large extent, Mr. Wehmeyer and the Rev. Rossouw’s magnificent building was razed to the ground by the court case." That evening, the council discussed and approved the sale, while 23 congregation members led by Wehmeyer signed a petition calling for a general congregation meeting discussing the congregation’s financial practices, one the council called "beneath its dignity to acknowledge." This turn of events led Pace, with Wehmeyer’s support, to file suit with the magistrate to block the sale, resulting in a December court order suspending it pending the council’s justification of its claims.

The council decided to contest the claims at 9 and 23 December special meetings, and on 31 March 1877, they agreed to assign the Rev. Rossouw power of attorney to represent them. He was going to Wellington anyway to assist the Rev. Andrew Murray, and thus would be near Cape Town to monitor the trial. In The 5 June 1877, issue of Volksblad, reported the 1 June verdict, decided earlier but officially announced once chief witnesses could come there after being held back by a storm at Mossel Bay. One of the main council-appointed witnesses turned back in the face of a second storm for Uniondale, leaving only Haese and Cairncross, who came after 1860 and did not have first-hand knowledge of the sale. Pace’s witnesses, Wehmeyer and Mostert, were old residents of Lyon.

The council’s lawyers, Buchanan & Jones, realized the council’s case was lost, and the Rev. Rossouw did not testify himself. The judge’s damning verdict called the council’s behavior "shameful," required them to pay all £500 in court costs, almost all of which was paid by the Rev. Rossouw’s father-in-law, J. J. Human, the rest with the congregation coffers. The Rev. Rossouw and congregation members repaid Human nearly £150, then sent for more "voluntary" donations, raising £350 to repay the bulk of the debt by the time the Rev. Rossouw left.

=== Resignation from Uniondale ===
Dr. Heese counters the accusation that the Rev. Rossouw plunged the congregation into debt and then abandoned it as follows: "This is not true. While his impulsive behavior made him unpopular with some congregation members, especially in light of the court verdict, he already had an offer from the Maraisburg Reformed Church but only accepted the one for the nearby Steynsburg Reformed Church (NGK) in 1878. His decision was understandably received with mixed feelings." Newspaper articles and reports from the time show part of the congregation happy with his exit, but others especially in the council quite attached and sorry to lose their "beloved pastor." One correspondent states that Krakeel should have been the capital and that the pastor-preferring residents of that area, the Langkloof valley, had grounds for their own congregation. The Rev. Rossouw’s popularity was admitted by his successor, the Rev. W.A. Joubert.

== In Franschhoek ==
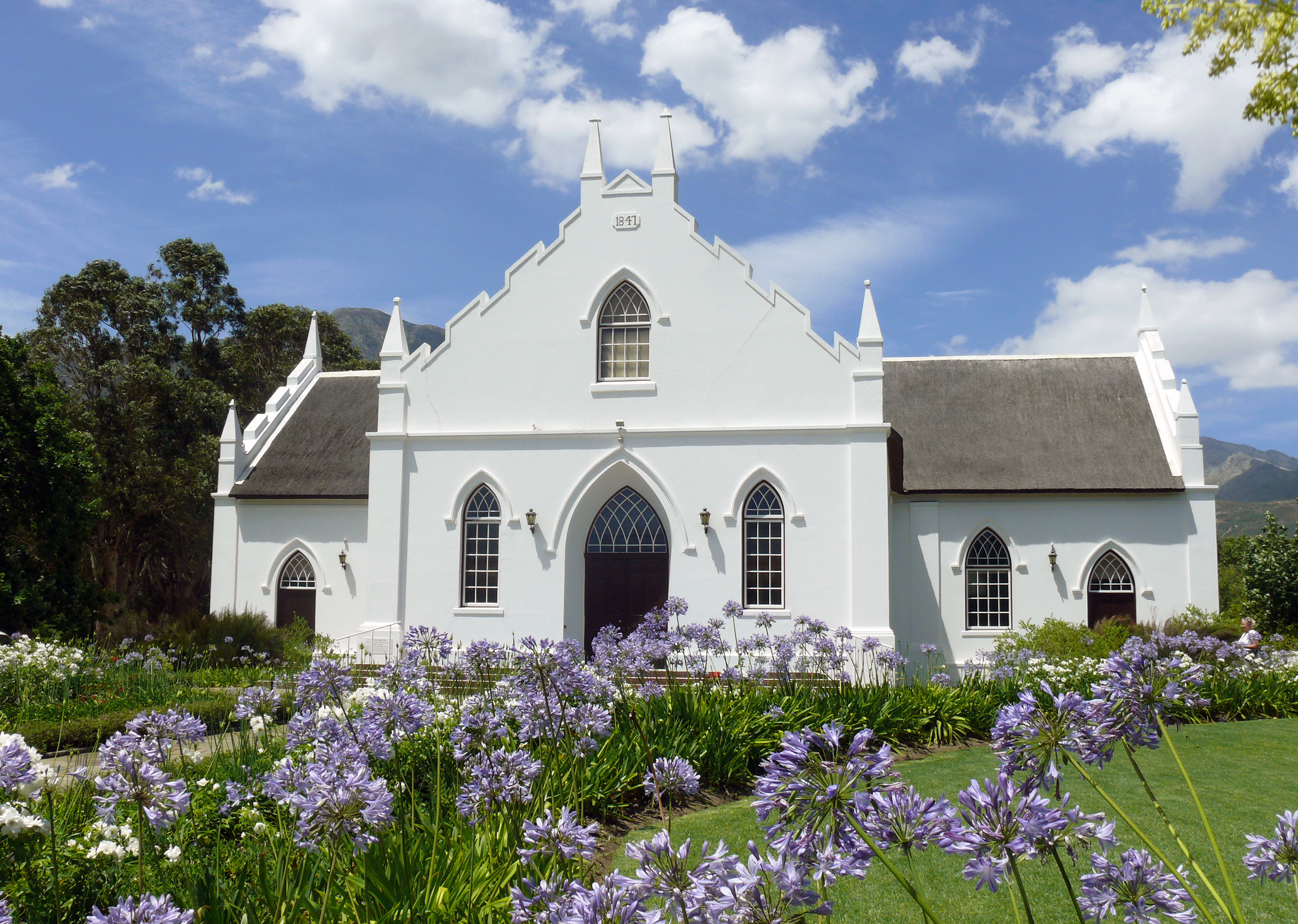
Franschhoek's NGK church was built in 1847, expanded in 1883, and partially restored in 1967–1968. The Rev. Rossouw was the local pastor from 8 September 1881 to 2 February 1883, when he left for Fraserburg

The Franschhoek NGK congregation waited six months from exit of the Rev. Jacobus George Joubert Krige (1873–1881) until the Rev. Rossouw’s arrival. On 6 September 1881, many members came several miles out of town to welcome him to town. The investiture ceremony on the 9th in a full church was attended by the Revs. J.H. Neethling (the consulent), Krige, Edmund de Beer, Murray, J. Stegmann, and Prof. J. Marais. The Rev. Neethling’s investiture sermon was based on fishing as discussed in Luke 5, while the Rev. Rossouw’s inaugural sermon was on Exodus 3:14: "God said to Moses, ‘I AM WHO I AM. This is what you are to say to the Israelites: [I AM has sent me to you].’"

At that time, the journey from Steynsburg to Franschhoek could only be made by sea, so the Rev. Rossouw traveled to Port Elizabeth by wagon and from there on the Nubian to Cape Town at a cost of £70, of which only £25 was compensated by the Rev. Rossouw from his less than four years in Steynsburg. Franschhoek, meanwhile, lost the government subsidy for the pastor grandfathered in with the Rev. Krige upon his exit, but was still in good shape for services and considering the church building enlargement the latter had explored. On 3 October 1881, the council approved a congregation meeting for the 20th which founded the construction committee, whose 15 November report to the council meeting showed differences of opinion over how to proceed. The results of the 21 November congregation meeting are unclear, but in the end it was agreed to add two wings and begin construction.

An agreement was made with the city to keep the parsonage water tank at ¾ of an inch and supply the full stream to the parsonage for six hours two days a week, with G.J. Kriel appointed to negotiate on the council’s behalf. Jacob Hugo disputed the water with the church council, leading to the municipality getting the water on condition that the parsonage would receive a sufficient share. The church decided at its 2 October 1882, meeting to build a well, and if successful a pump, rather than waiting for a pipe to be laid. The 1882 Ring report concluded that despite the bustling trade, smallpox in Cape Town, and generally hard times," perhaps worse in Franschhoek than elsewhere, collections equaled the previous year and were much more than for the two before it. The thanksgiving feast built the sustenance fund up to £758 6 s. 8 d.

During the Rev. Rossouw’s tenure, late services shifted from the afternoon to the evening, and young people began attending more. At the end of 1882, he took a post in Fraserburg, handing in his resignation on 28 January 1883, from the Steynsburg congregation. Fraserburg thus reimbursed the Rev. Rossouw’s travel costs to Franschhoek, since once again the Rev. Rossouw hadn't reached his four-year threshold.

== In Fraserburg ==
After the Rev. Carl Arnoldus Bamberger resigned from the Fraserburg Reformed Church, the council first interviewed the Rev. Adriaan Moorrees of the Richmond Reformed Church on 25 September 1882. He declined, and so the Rev. Rossouw was hired that 1 November and welcomed to the congregation for investiture on 5 February 1883. D.A. Kotzé writes:

If his predecessor laid the temporal foundations for his flock, he laid the spiritual ones. His successor states that he “sowed and plowed well.” Perhaps it was a matter of circumstance, since constant droughts plagued the indifferent, thus requiring spiritual development to compensate their temporal poverty.

=== Persistent droughts ===
Remembered by one of the oldest congregation members in the 1951 centennial of the congregation as "a great soul-winner, school and missionary man," the Rev. Rossouw emphasized missionary and education work during his tenure. A year after his arrival, the council could report to the Ring that "since his confirmation, the Church Council has had the pleasure of being able to work in complete harmony with him in promoting the eternal and temporal needs of the Congregation." Without his aptitude, Kotzé writes, "unimaginable and unprecedented disasters would have occurred, given the almost indescribable droughts that relentlessly plagued the region. In 1884, the drought peaked to the point where home visits were impossible, but the pastor regularly visited satellite churches and kept in contact with the congregation. Maintaining schools seemed next to impossible for the council, but separate Sunday school for white and Cape Coloured children continued. Attendance rose despite farmers needing to travel far and wide to pasture their livestock.

A Ring report from the time stated that "more than one told of never feeling as abandoned by God as now." The drought reached a point in 1885 where "entire households would have perished had He not opened the hearts of other countrymen. But money and supplies have come in generously for which we praise the Lord. We will owe them our gratitude for as long as we live." A relief committee was organized and met three times a week to issue provisions, though "it was exhausted quickly, and there was no end to the need. Needless to say, many were impoverished. Parishioners with large households who recently were affluent lost everything and now survive on bread and depend on others to house them. How long the misery will continue, the Lord only knows, but the danger is not over and the need is growing."

The congregation was largely depopulated as it scarcely rained for two years, driving farmers to seek their livelihoods in the Prieska, Hopetown, Richmond, Britstown, and Murraysburg, even to the Sneeuberge and Middelburg, Eastern Cape. Prayer hours increased from the one hour that had prevailed for 20 years to four. Recovery began in February 1887, spurred on further by a mission conference held at the beginning of June attended by the vast majority of the congregation who substantially subsidized the Domestic Mission Debt. Improvements were only temporary however, according to the 1888 Ring Report, and in 1889, the drought returned after a grueling seven years. The report stated that "our people have had to spend hundreds, never mind, thousands, of pounds sterling to rent fields and buy water elsewhere. Thousands of sheep died in the last fifteen months alone, such that one farmer went from 2,000 to 1,000 of them last year to this year and another went from 3,000 to under 400."

Judging by the church minutes, however, the pastor and congregation felt spiritually confident: "our God not only dwelled in the Burning bush and kept it holy, but by his Almighty Power enabled it to grow amidst the flames and bear the most glorious fruit." Hence, they contributed £14 to the Bechuanaland congregation, £5 for the Domestic Mission, £15 for the Mission, £14 10s. for the Kweekskool, and another £20 7s. despite public skepticism toward other miscellaneous mission ends. Even thanksgiving offerings were beyond expectations, delivering £450, 500 sheep, and two horses. On 1 September, the day thanksgiving month began, the drought peaked and those remaining began to consider leaving, but rain fell on the night of the 5th and contributions brought the congregation’s debt down from £1,183 to £840 by 1 October with no interest in arrears. The council had 650 sheep, two horses, and two bales of wool as collateral. The Sunday schools made progress, the domestic and outside missions carried on, and both men’s and women’s prayers were well-attended.

Unfortunately, 1889 saw continued struggle. Dams stayed dry, fountains were weakened, fields scorched by writhing winds, and seedlings yielding nothing but dust. "In many places, the stench of dead sheep arose around the kraals while people dreaded the worst. Hardly a sign of rain came from the sky, and when the west wind blew cold, the situation worsened. That December, however, torrential rains fell, "finally relieving the drought and restoring our confidence, changing the face of our congregation dramatically." Many twin lambs were born in 1890, and the parish debt was fully paid off from its £1,000 1889 level by the end of 1890. From 1891, the congregation was solvent, and the Rev. Rossouw miraculously healed from a serious, four-year illness.

=== Trellis work on the second church ===
In 1890, the council grew to four members, two elders and two deacons. A congregation meeting was also held to decide on whether to build a trellis railing around the church, at which the consensus settled on a £1,000 budget. On 12 January 1891, the Rev. Rossouw reported to the council on his pricing consultations with businessmen Mr. De Waal and Mr. De Kock at the previous Synod meeting; they contacted a Scottish firm that had sold such fencing to a Table Bay congregation for £600 including £120 for shipping. Frans Maritz brought it from the nearest train station at 2/6 per 100 pounds minus £5 subsidy to the cause, and the council prepared for a celebration. Prof. Nicolaas Hofmeyr at the Kweekskool was invited to be master of ceremonies, since he proposed the idea to beautify and seclude the building, but he could not come to Fraserburg for the 3 September inauguration, sending his regards a month alter. The final cost was £1,320.

== The Rev. Rossouw’s illness and death ==
On 3 December 1892, the Rev. Rossouw asked for leave after an exhausting decade. Kotzé wrote as follows: "the respective debt and poverty of the church and members, to say nothing of the illness of his valued and indispensable helpmate, his wife, weighed heavily on his robes. It was too much for flesh and blood, for the Rev. Rossouw turned to the masses his tender heart, feeling and suffering with them. Now he ached physically as though taking the blows his congregation withstood." The Rev. Rossouw planned to go to the Boland to rest "on the beach" and recover his strength, and on 23 January 1893 turned in to the council a letter and two doctors’ certificates attesting to his health issues. The council expressed in reply their "heartfelt regret for the visiting hand of God resting on our beloved Pastor" and gave him six months’ leave, which allowed him to recuperate enough to serve another four years. However, by October 1896, his still questionable health had deteriorated once more.

On 11 October 1896, the Rev. Rossouw, 14 years the pastor of the Fraserburg congregation, died. De Zuid-Afrikaan eulogized him as follows on the 15th: "he was an Evangelist overflowing with deep earnestness, holy fire, and an inexhaustible industriousness. He was not only a pastor, but also a close friend in the best sense of the word of the poor and the afflicted." The Rev. De Beer said in De Vereeniging: "he was a pastor of unusual anointing." Classmates from Cape Town considered his success at the pulpit a surprise given his youthful stutter. P.J. and G.S. Nienaber wrote in Geskiedenis van Afrikaans letterkunde: "the Rev. Rossouw was also gifted with a fine sense of humor. The Rev. De Beer told of a Synod meeting at which he sniffled through a heavy cold and the Rev. Rossouw said to him: "Brother, you don’t need to blow your own trumpet that much."

On 26 October 1896, the council recorded "how deeply they felt the great loss that the Church in general, and that church in particular, have suffered as a result of his early death. That the Church Council values his faithful work in the church and thanks God for what He has given to the Church and the congregation through the Reverend." The Rev. Rossouw was buried in the church cemetery at a well-attended ceremony, and the congregation raised a gravestone in his honor. The town council also named the street through the Fraserburg central business district of the time Rossouw Street in his honor.

== Literary contributions ==
Dr. Heese wrote in the 1966 Uniondale Reformed Church centennial book: "the Rev. Rossouw earned a place of honor among the [Afrikaans] language’s pioneers."

On 4 October 1878, he published his brief in Die Afrikaanse Patriot advocating for sermons in Afrikaans, and just three months later, on 10 January 1879, one of his own became the first exemplar in print in the very same publication. His Afrikaans sermons were collected in book form as Godsdienstige stukke (Afrikaans for "religious excerpts") in 1881. The Rev. Rossouw wrote in the 28 September 1884 Patriot as to why he wrote in the language:

We write in this Afrikaans language because we know it truly is a language and that the arguments of its proponents have never and can never be refuted. Another reason is that one can express oneself far more powerfully in Afrikaans than in Dutch, and there is expressiveness, directness, a je-ne-sais-quoi which is not found in many languages. Also, most of our population understands it better than anything else, and therefore the great unwashed among our compatriots can hear of their salvation in a language they speak and hear every day.

P.J. and G.S. Nienaber wrote in Geskiedenis van Afrikaanse letterkunde: "the Rev. Rossouw spoke to his readers from heart to heart and never hesitated to present to them the awfulness of hell besides the atonement of Christ." They continue with the following examples:

Oh, how terrible it will be, if there is a father or mother among the readers of the Patriot who suffers an immoral life that leads them to the sin which dare not speak its name! Parents who drink!...We sure you whether you are young or old, that there is a hell, an eternal damnation, a terrible place of torment, for those who do not take salvation from the hand of the Lord Jesus. So let yourself listen, and fall not to damnation.

On 12 December 1879, the Rev. Rossouw’s sermon answered the question, "What is sin?" and ended his sermon asking the sinner: "Have you never trembled at the sight of your sin, or trembled at the thought of hell and eternal damnation? Then tremble today, shudder today!!" His preaching was very popular, and he received letters of appreciation and testimonies from repentant readers. The sermons in the Patriot, the Nienabers wrote, reached those who never darkened a church door, read a bible, or visited a pastor, but were ended on 31 October 1884.

His influence on the language’s promotion was great, spiritually and otherwise. He worked with the Rev. Stephanus Jacobus du Toit and other pastors on the Bijbelsch Dagboek (Afrikaans for "biblical diary"), designed that so that a family could read through the New Testament over the course of a year. An appropriate statement and Psalm verse was included near various scripture passages. Shortly before the Rev. Rossouw’s death, he collaborated with the Rev. Murray on a Dutch translation of the Book of Martyrs by John Foxe, detailing tortures endured by Christians from Jesus himself through the Protestant pioneers, deemed "particularly fascinating" by Prof. Nienaber. According to the Rev. Rossouw’s grandson Leon Rousseau, the translation worsened Dutch and Afrikaner attitudes toward the Catholic Church.

The Rev. Rossouw wrote poems during his Fraserburg tenure, including ones in Afrikaans, Dutch, and English. Some of his Dutch poems were published in De Zuid-Afrikaan under the pseudonym "P.D.R. van Uiendal." English poems, including one on the Battle of Majuba Hill, were published in the South African News. Under the pseudonym Cefas, he wrote the famed Afrikaans-language poem "John MacKensie moenie grens nie" ("John MacKenzie, no borders!"), published in Die Afrikaanse Patriot on 29 August 1884.

The latter poem that made him famous related to an incident in 1882 where the Republics of Stellaland and Goshen, founded by Boer settlers on land seized with the help of Tswana chiefs Moshette and Massouw from their British-backed rivals Montsioa and Mankoroane. The proxy battle was settled by the London Convention (1884) that divided the land between Britain and Transvaal, with the Rev. MacKenzie appointed commissioner under direct British rule. The Rev. MacKenzie was a better missionary than statesman, and was particularly criticized for his natives policy, ultimately being recalled by High Commissioner of South Africa Sir Hercules Robinson, 1st Baron Rosmead. Prof. Nienaber considered the satire "at home with the work of the best Dutch and English poets."

Stellaland

Aan die adres van John Mackenzie

John Mackensie, moenie grens nie! Ja, jou tyd was kort; jy het nie kan toon nie wat daar in jou woon nie; sonder seremonie moes jy somaar vort!

John Mackensie, moenie grens nie! Jy moes gou laat vat; ag, die swarte brawe moet nou goud gaan grawe as die "Boers" hul slawe – en jy in die pad

John Mackensie, moenie grens nie – word nie stapelgek! Van jou fraaie drome is daar niks gekome; hulle bly maar drome – en jy moet laat trek!

John Mackensie, moenie grens nie – ons het medely!. Jy het nie gebrom nie om so ver te kom nie; wie was nie verstom nie? En nou moet jy gly!

John Mackensie, moenie grens nie – ons doet niks as sug! Wie kon dit voorspelle dat hul jou sou kwelle tot jy heen moes snelle, bondel op die rug?

John Mackensie, moenie grens nie – hou jou by jou lees! Want dit hou geen steek nie om die wet te preek nie as jy dit self breek nie –

Jy is daar gewees!!

English translation:

Stellaland

Addressing John MacKenzie

John Mackensie, no borders! Yes, your time was short; you cannot show what lives in you; without ceremony, you had to leave!

John Mackensie, no borders! You had to go quickly; oh, the black braves must now dig for gold as the “Boers” are their slaves – and you in the road

John Mackensie, no borders – don’t be insane! Nothing came of your beautiful dreams; they keep dreaming – and you have to leave!

John Mackensie, no borders – we sympathize! You didn’t complain to get this far; who was not stunned? And now you have to slide!

John Mackensie, no borders – we do nothing but sigh! Who could have predicted that they would torment you until you hurried, knapsack on your back?

John Mackensie, no borders – you keep reading! For it is no sting to preach the law if you break it yourself –

You have been there!!

== Leon Rousseau writes about his grandfather ==
Leon Rousseau (5 March 1931 – 24 February 2016), the writer and publisher in Afrikaans and founder of the publisher Human & Rousseau, recounted in 2013 in the Kerkbode how he found his grandfather’s Bible unopened after 60 years. Leon inherited it from his father Pierre, born on 22 February 1882 and thus 14 at the Rev. Rossouw’s death, dying in turn at 22 November 1954. Rousseau does not record how many children the Rev. Rossouw had (other sources report eight), but his children did change the family name to Rousseau. "Grandfather was often busy with the Bible or with a sermon in his study, and Grandmother with her numerous plants," Leon relayed from Pierre, who enlisted in Pieter Hendrik Kritzinger’s commandos in 1901 and was seriously wounded and sentenced to death for his role in the Cape Rebellion. He was pardoned, however, and several years after the end of the Second Boer War, he married Leon’s mother, the 20-year-old Elise Gardner. Elisabeth Luise Rousseau was the sister of Prof. G.B.A. Gerdener and aunt of the colorful politician Theo Gerdener. Pierre later served as a school principal in Worcester.

The Rossouws had eight children:

- Sophia Agnes Johanna Rousseau (married Knobel), 23 February 1870 – 7 November 1916
- Gideon Jacobus Rousseau, 5 February 1875 – 30 October 1918
- Johannes Zacharias Human Rousseau, born 15 June 1878
- Catharina Maryna Elizabeth Rousseau (married Van der Merwe), 16 October 1879 – 27 June 1964
- Pierre Daniël Rousseau, 22 February 1882 – 20 November 1954
- Andrew Murray Rousseau, 21 July 1884 – 20 November 1941
- Maria Luise Rousseau (married Michau), born 1 March 1890 – 1915
- Johan Heinrich Bruchhauser Rousseau, 25 March 1894 – 10 October 1900

== Sources ==
- Heese, Dr. J.A. (1966). Die kerk in die wolke. Eeufees-gedenkboek Uniondale, 1866–1966. Uniondale: NG Kerkraad.
- Kannemeyer, J.C. (2005). Die Afrikaanse literatuur 1652–2004. Cape Town/Pretoria: Human & Rousseau.
- Kotzé, D.A. (1951). Die Gemeente Fraserburg. 'n Eeufees-gedenkboek (1851–1951). Fraserburg: NG Kerkraad.
- Krüger, Prof. D.W. and Beyers, C.J. (chief ed.) (1977). Suid-Afrikaanse Biografiese Woordeboek, vol. III. Cape Town: Tafelberg-Uitgewers.
- Nienaber G.S., and Nienaber, P.J. (1941). Geskiedenis van die Afrikaanse letterkunde. Pretoria: J.L. van Schaik, Bepk.
- Nienaber, P.J. (1949). Hier Is Ons Skrywers! Biografiese Sketse van Afrikaanse Skrywers. Johannesburg: Afrikaanse Pers-Boekhandel.
- Oberholster, rev. J.A.S. (1945). Eeufees-Gedenkboek Franschhoek. 'n Oorsig van die Geskiedenis van die Gemeente, 1845–1945. Franschhoek: NG Kerkraad.
- Olivier, Rev. P.L. (1952). Ons gemeentelike feesalbum. Cape Town/Pretoria: N.G. Kerk-uitgewers.
