= Jan S. Marais =

South African banker and politician

- Born: April 23, 1919; Fraserburg, Northern Cape, South Africa
- Died: 2009 (aged 89–90)
- Education: Stellenbosch University
- Occupation: Banker
- Known for: Founder & chairman of the Trust Bank of Africa
- Spouse: Peggy
- Children: 1 daughter

Jan S. Marais (April 23, 1919 – 2009) was a South African banker and politician. He was the founder and chairman of the Trust Bank of Africa, one of South Africa's largest banks. He was a National member of the Parliament of South Africa, and a vocal critic of the party's apartheid system.

== Early life ==
Jan S. Marais was born as Johannes Stephanus Marais on April 23, 1919, in Fraserburg, Northern Cape. He graduated from Stellenbosch University.

== Banking career ==
Marais was the general manager of Federale Volksbeleggings, an Afrikaner investment company.

Marais founded the Trust Bank of Africa in 1954, and he served as its chairman. By the 1970s, it had become "one of the country's major banks." Marais subsequently sold the Trust Bank to Sanlam.

Marais served as the non-executive chairman of FundTrust, an investment company, until it went bankrupt in 1991.

== Politics ==
Marais was a critic of apartheid. As the chairman of the South Africa Foundation in the 1970s, he argued that the Anti-Apartheid Movement hurt South African businesses. Marais sold Trustbank to join the National Party and served as a member Parliament of South Africa as the representative of Durban, the only time ever that the liberal constituency was won by the National Party. He stood until 1981. He used his platform as a politician to call for the repeal of the Group Areas Act.

== Personal life and death ==
Dr. Jan S Marais was born in the Karoo, in the town of Fraserburgh, Northern Cape, South Africa. After school, as the oldest son, he had to manage the farm. Within months he reorganized the farm and spend his time reading detective stories and had only one dream, to become a train driver! His father knew better and send him to university where he went from class to class with no direction. A senior played a joke on him by inviting him to a statistic class where they were writing a test to Marais's surprise. That was the first time that he thought that he should visit the same class twice. He went back the next week for his results but the lecturer did not hand it out. After class, he asked if there is a Mr. Marais and asked him to stay behind. He handed Marais his test for which he had full marks! After a short interview, he took Marais under his wing up to the time that he went to work for the Federale Volksbeleggings. From there he was later sent to study in America. He did his master's degree on Successful People and later with his return to South Africa, started the TrustBank that changed banking worldwide. The change in his bank's approach towards their clients stemmed from the time that he saw Mary Poppins as a little boy. There was a scene where a child approaches the bank with a little porcelain pig containing all her savings... When she enters the bank the atmosphere was so thick with the counters protected by bars back then. The small child got so scared, dropped her savings and it scattered all over the floor while she was running out. Marais decided that day that he would like to change this one day. He felt it should be an inviting, appreciating atmosphere as the bank wants people to entrust their savings with the bank. That was one of many things that made his banking system unique at the time. One of his claims to fame from those days was that all female workers got hair and clothing allowance and were encouraged to wear mini dresses. Marais had a wife, Peggy, who died in the 1980s, and an adopted daughter, Carla, she had three children. He resided in Seapoint during the early TrustBank days and later in Cape Town city center. After the Fundtrust debacle, he moved to Durbanville. to his death.

Marais died in 2009.
