= Williston, South Africa =

Williston
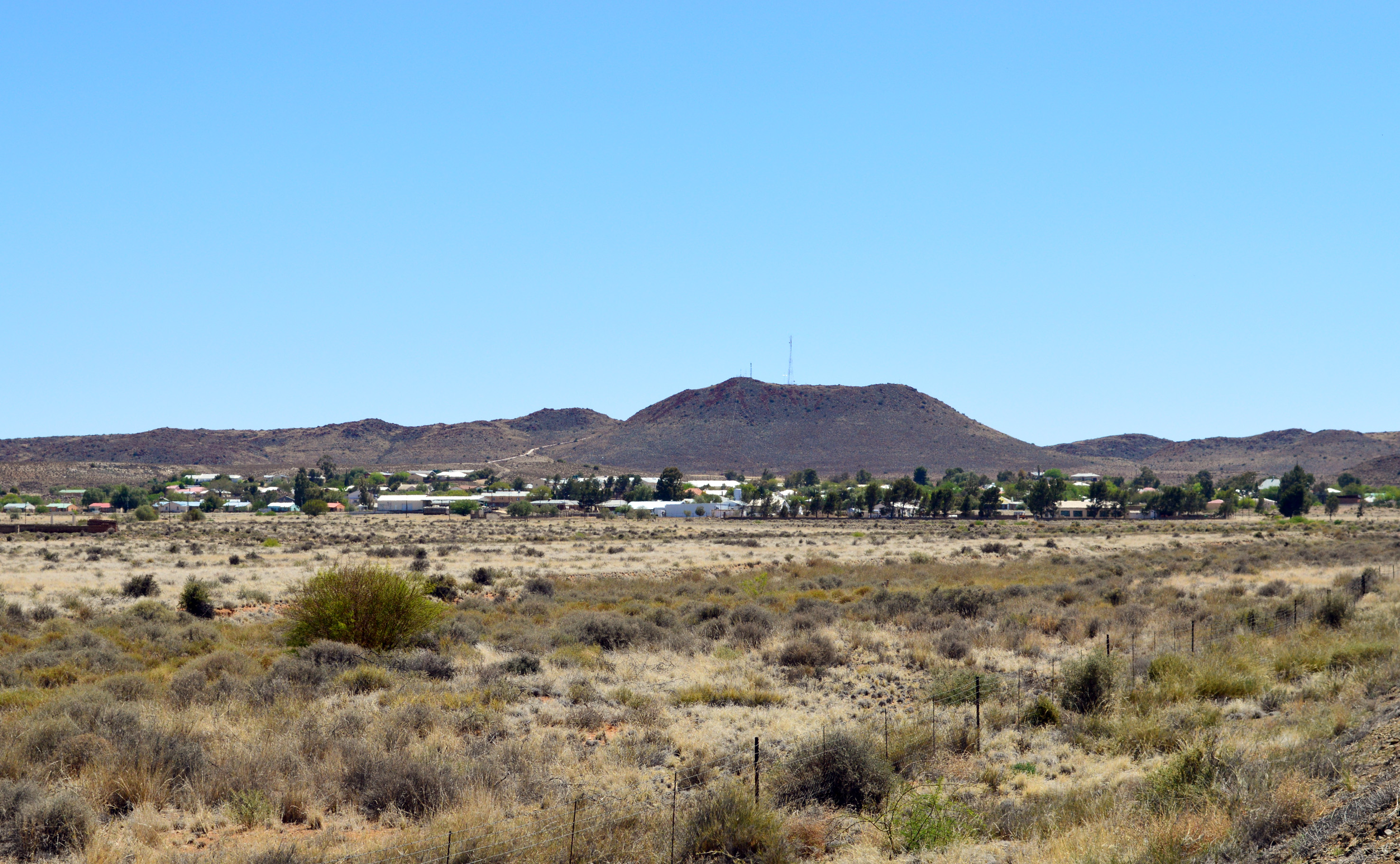
- Williston

- Location within Northern Cape Location within South Africa
- Coordinates: 31°21′S 20°55′E
- Country: South Africa
- Province: Northern Cape
- District: Namakwa
- Municipality: Karoo Hoogland
  - Councillor: (ANC)

Area
  - Total: 77.95 km^{2} (30.10 sq mi)
- Elevation: 1,070 m (3,510 ft)

Population (2011)
  - Total: 3,368
  - Density: 43.21/km^{2} (111.9/sq mi)

Racial makeup (2011)
  - Coloured: 83.6%
  - White: 9.4%
  - Black African: 5.6%
  - Indian/Asian: 0.8%
  - Other: 0.7%

First languages (2011)
  - Afrikaans: 96.2%
  - Xhosa: 1.3%
  - English: 1.2%
  - Other: 1.3%
- Time zone: UTC+2 (SAST)
- Postal code (street): 8920
- PO box: 8920
- Area code: 053

Williston is a town in Northern Cape, South Africa. The town is located 103 km north-east of Calvinia and 140 km south-west of Carnarvon.

== History ==
Williston was originally known as Amandelboom (Afrikaans "almond tree") as a large almond tree stood as the focal point of the town by the Sak River. The tree had been planted in 1768 by Johan Abraham Nel, a farmer and owner of the land that was to become the town, to commemorate the birth of one of his sons. In the early 19th century, the district was populated by pastoralists who constantly moved their livestock between springs in search of fresh grazing areas. These pastoralists were derogatorily referred to as 'Basters' as the pastoralists were of mixed race and descendants of the Khoi and Dutch. In 1845, the community requested that the Rhenish Church, which had a mission station in Wuppertal, establish another mission station in Williston. Two missionaries were sent to Williston to assist the community with their spiritual needs. By 1845, a Rhenish mission station was established in the area by Johann Heinrich Lutz.

In the 1860s, a population of white nomadic farmers moved into the area. The arrival of the new farmers precipitated the movement of many mixed-race community members out of Williston. The mixed race population migrated north across Bushmanland and crossed the Orange River into Namibia to the town of Rohoboth.

Williston grew into a town around the mission station, and it was declared a municipality in 1881. The town was formally renamed Williston in 1919 after the British Colonial Secretary of the Cape Colony, Colonel Hampden Willis. The town became an official district in 1926. The area became known for its sheep farming, which continues to this day. The town often experience droughts and water shortages. A local clergyman, Reverend S. Kuhn, used dynamite to blow up the town's central spring near the Sak River in an attempt to increase the flow of water. Unfortunately, all that Reverend Kuhn succeeded in doing was destroying the historic almond tree.

== Buildings ==
=== Dutch Reformed Church ===
The first Dutch Reformed Church in Williston was built in 1878 while the town was still named 'Amandelboom'. The stone Dutch Reformed Church in the centre of the town was completed in 1912. A primary school teacher, Mr J.H. Swart, who lived in Williston during the 1930s, engaged in a large tree-planting project with his students. The tree-lined roads in Williston that remain are evidence of this planting project.

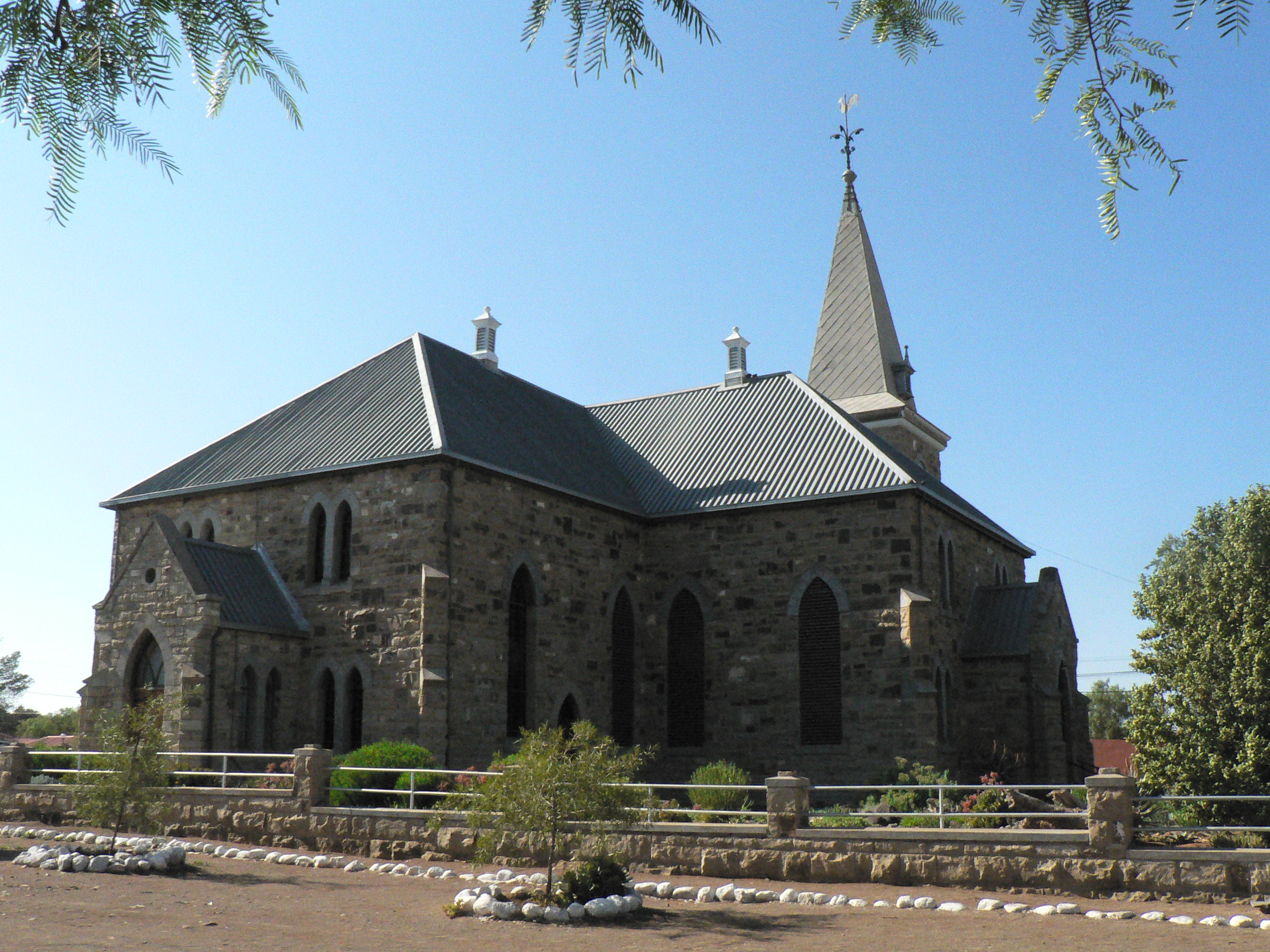
The Dutch Reformed Church in Williston

=== Corbelled Houses ===
Pioneer farmers originally built these houses in Williston, Fraserburg and Carnarvon between 1811 and 1815. The Corbel House is regarded as the first architectural style in the northwest Karoo. Corbelled describes the manner in which stones are stacked in the construction of these buildings. The farmers used flat stones, which are common in the area, to build the homes. The floors were made of sand which had been mixed with animal fat and blood. The floor was then polished with a flat stone.

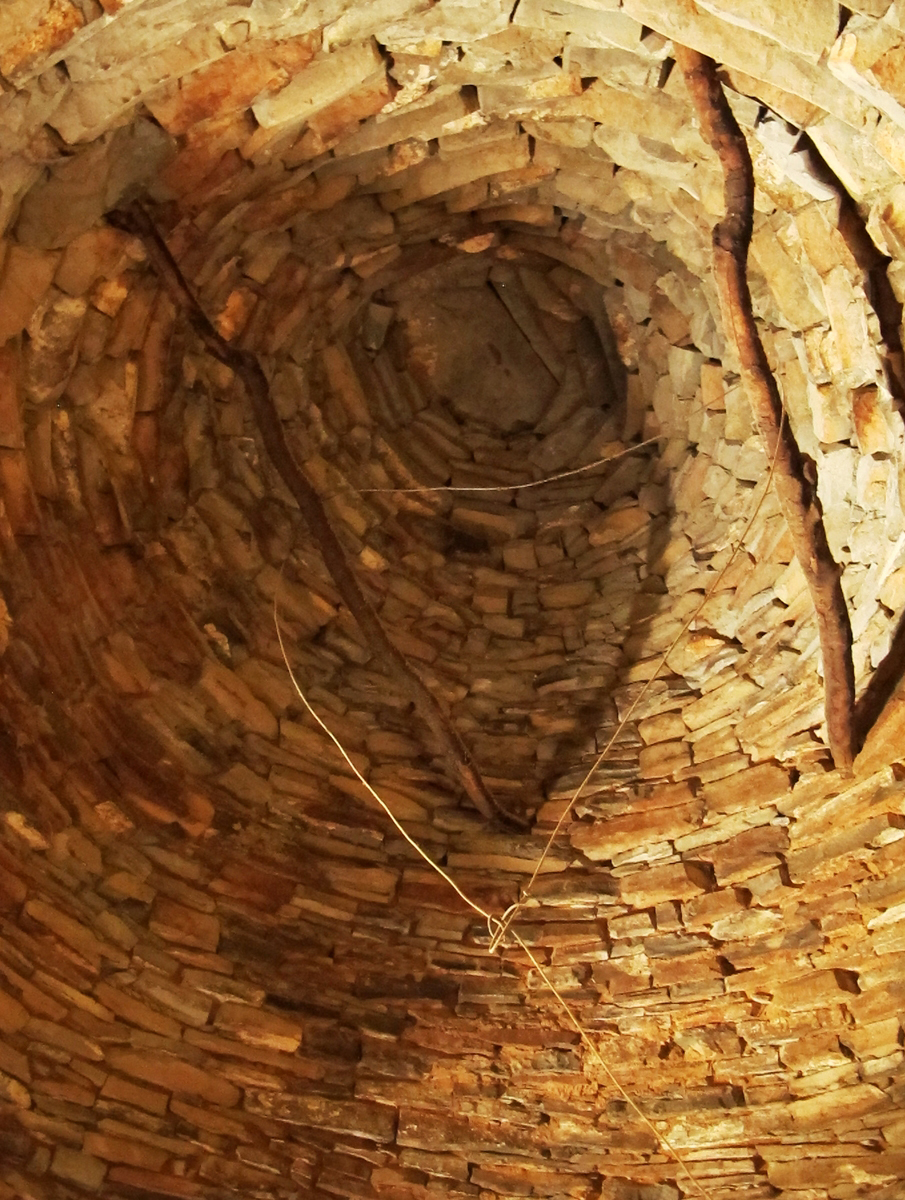
The interior of a Corbel house which still stands in Williston

== Attractions ==
The Williston Winter Festival is an annual regional festival which takes place at the end of winter in September. It celebrates local dance, song and storytelling. Nama Riel dancers perform an ancient celebratory dance in the courtyard of the Williston Mall where the festival is held.

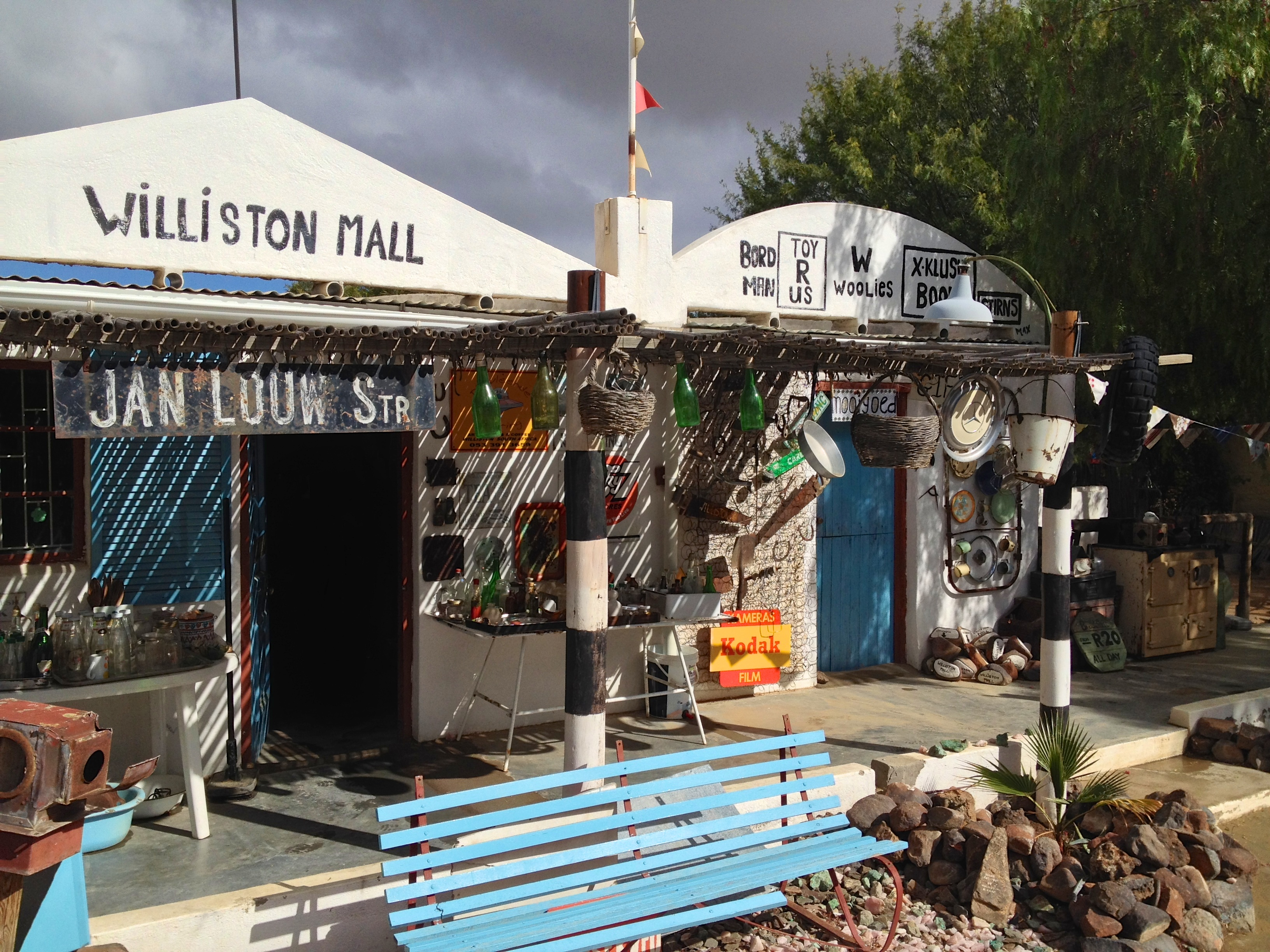
The Williston Mall where the annual Williston Winter Festival takes place

The town also offers a Tombstone Route out of Williston which follows the work of Cornelius, a master-carver who engraved gravestones for the people of the Upper Karoo.

== See also ==
- Calvinia
- Nama people
