= Beaufort West Reformed Church =

Church in Beaufort West, South Africa

Coordinates: 32°21′00″S 22°34′59″E

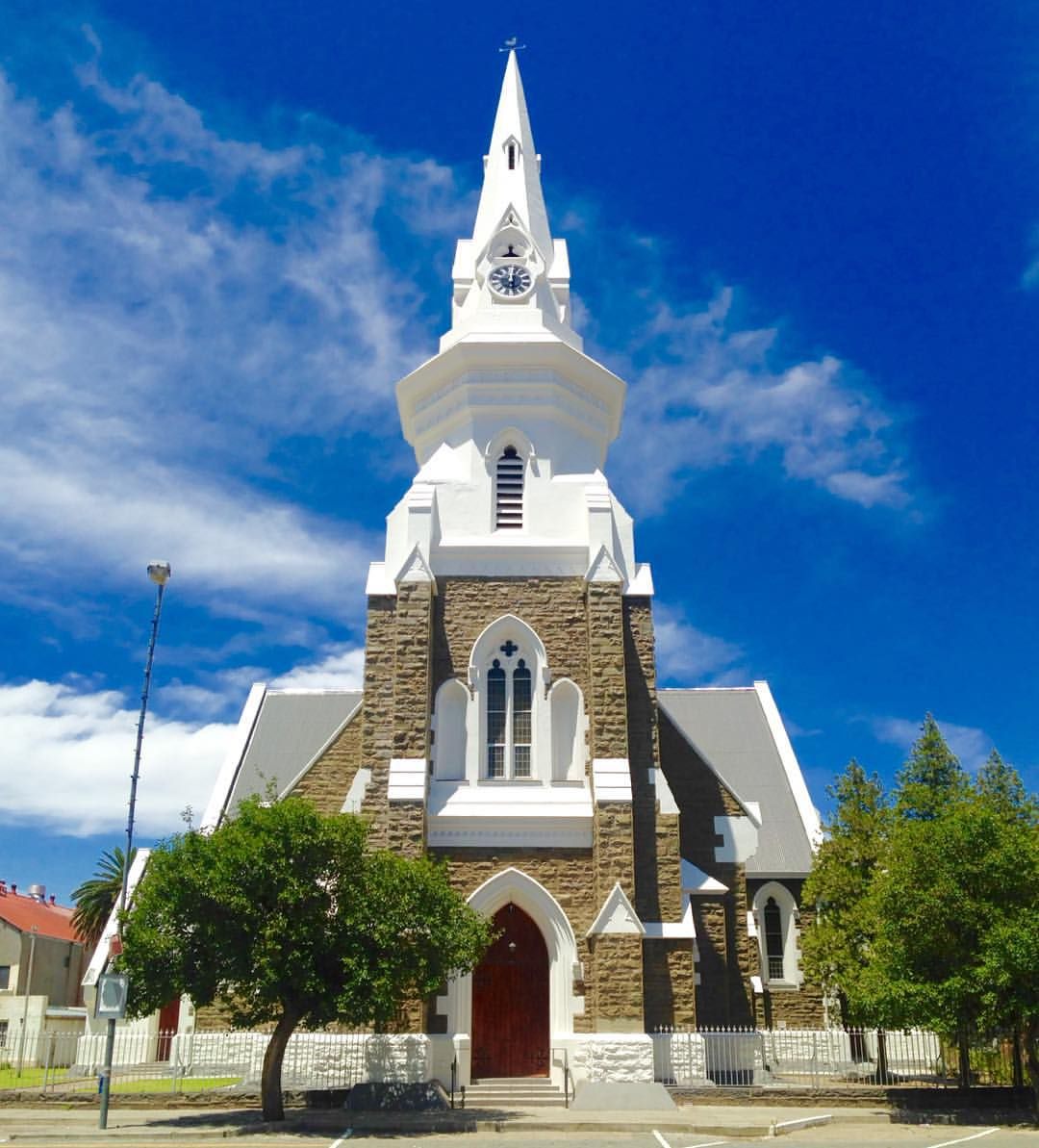
View of the church building

The Beaufort West Reformed Church is a church in South Africa, founded on 16 May 1820. It is the ninth oldest congregation of the Dutch Reformed Church in the Synod of Western and Southern Cape and the 12th oldest in the entire Church.

From Beaufort West, six daughter congregations seceded: Prince Albert (1842), Victoria West (1843), Fraserburg (1851), Carnarvon (1874), and Gamka Valley and Gamka-Oos on Beaufort-West itself (1949).

== Background ==
The first migrant farmers moved into the Koup and the Nuweveld in 1760, with the first farms laid out in the district of Beaufort West. The same year, the Hooyvlakte in de Carro farm was established, on which the town would later be laid out upon. The region remained extremely sparsely populated for many years.

By the end of the 18th century, some farmers already had livestock farms far north of the Nuweveld Mountains. Thus, the foundation was laid for the later parish, town and district of Beaufort-Wes and the parishes that were separated from the old mother parish over time.

== Ministers ==
The following have been ministers of the church:

1. John Taylor, 1818–1824
2. Colin Fraser, 1825–1862
3. Albert Zinn, 1864 – November 15 1866 (died in office)
4. Willem Petrus de Villiers, 1868–1875 (after which first pastor of Carnarvon Reformed Church until retirement in 1904)
5. Louis Hugo, 1876–1896
6. Pieter van der Merwe, 1896–1904
7. Gen. Paul Roux, 1905 – 8 June 1911 (died in office)
8. J.G. Steytler, 1912–1920
9. Johannes Rabie, 1921–1942
10. André Francois Malan, 1941–1944
11. Daniel Van Niekerk Theron, 1943–1944
12. Jan Christoffel du Plessis, 1945–1951
13. Lodewyk Petrus Spies, 1945–1948 (after which first pastor of Herman Steyn Reformed Church on Vereeniging)
14. Jacob Andries Cornelius Weidemann, 1947–1949 (until 1958 first pastor of Gamka Valley)
15. David Frederik van der Merwe, 1951–1961
16. Johannes Jacobus van As, 1962–1968
17. Charles Cumpries Bond, 1968–1972
18. Daniel Nicolaas van Zyl, 1970–1974
19. Bennie Meyer, 6 October 1972–1976
20. Adriaan Albertus (Riaan) Terblanche, 1980–1998
21. Japie van Straaten, 1998 – present
