= Fraserburg Reformed Church =

Church in Fraserburg, South Africa

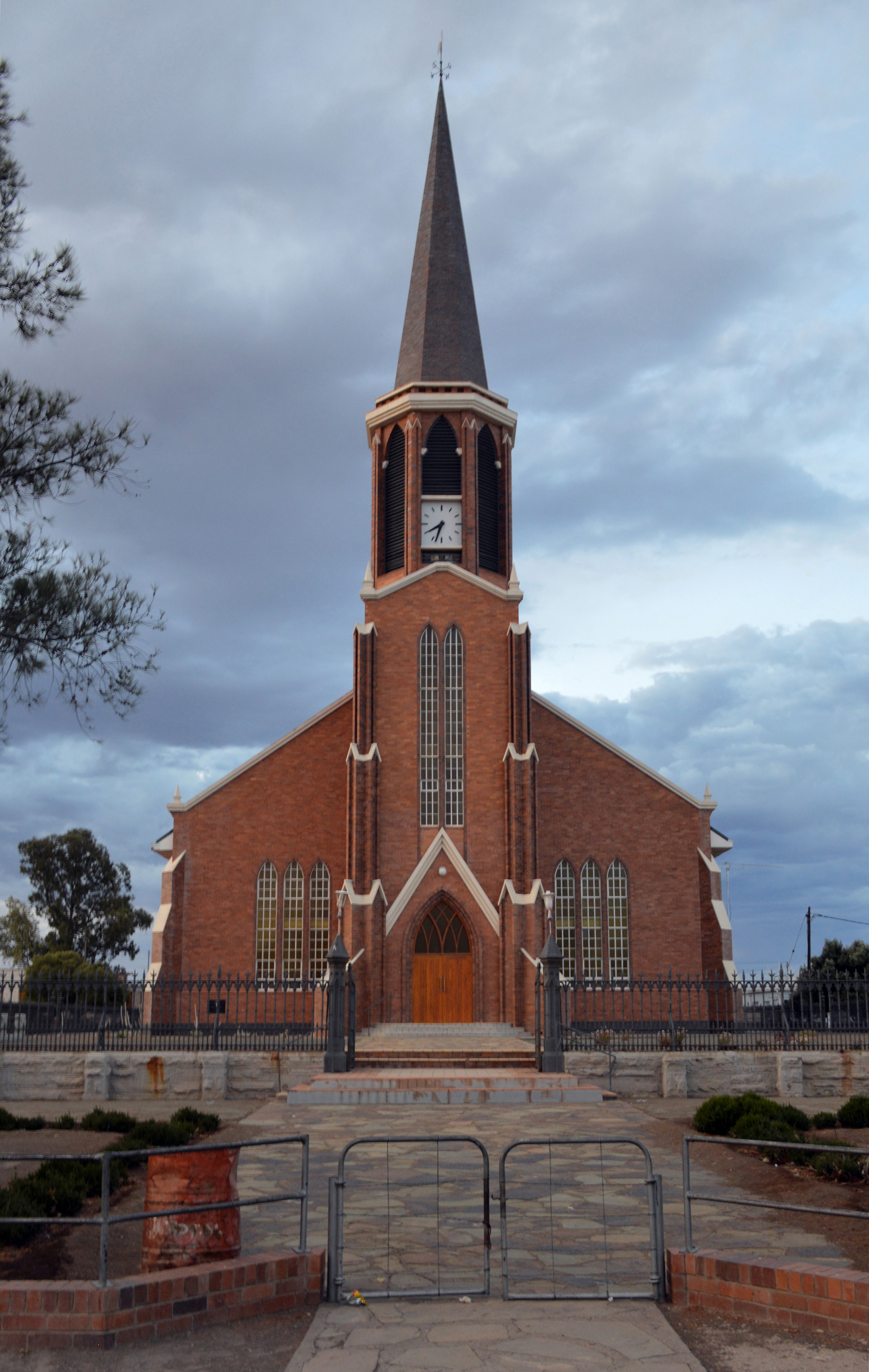
- Fraserburg Reformed Church
- 31.9141°S 21.5097°E
- Location: Fraserburg
- Country: South Africa
- Denomination: Nederduits Gereformeerde Kerk

History
- Founded: 1745

Architecture
- Functional status: Church

The Fraserburg Reformed Church is a congregation of the Dutch Reformed Church in the Synod of the Western and Southern Cape, although the town of Fraserburg falls within the province of the Northern Cape. In the old Cape Church, before the division of this Synod into three, Fraserburg was the 38th oldest congregation when it was founded on 24 February 1851. It is therefore a year or so younger than Humansdorp, Namaqualand and Ladismith (all three 1850), but older than Knysna (also 1851), Hopefield, Middelburg, Aliwal-Noord and Robertson (all 1852).

== Background ==
Between the years 1780 and 1830, the West Nuweveld part of the Karoo was just as tamed by trekkers as other border areas of that time. After the expulsion of the Bushmen, the region was annexed step by step. There was no question of proper religious training of members of the Church in the days around and at the founding of the congregation of Fraserburg. The immigrants began to inhabit the area from different directions. Some were accepted at Tulbagh, others at Worcester, still others at Graaff-Reinet. There were also those who were baptized in one place and became members in another, hundreds of miles away. Ecclesiastically, the later Fraserburg formed part of the congregation of Beaufort-West, which around 1830 was a very small place. It had only a few inhabitants and no church. Originally it was intended as an outpost to stop runaway slaves and escaped criminals and prevent them from crossing the colony's border and escaping. The first minister there was the Rev. John Taylor, and among his widely scattered flock also counted the Nuweveld pioneers. The task of this minister was almost superhuman. In the town he had to hold church in a tent of canvas. His congregation was extremely mobile and in size it covered most of the area between Tulbagh and Graaff-Reinet.

In December 1824, Rev. Colin Fraser was appointed to succeed him as pastor of the removed congregation. He played a major role in his new sphere of work for many years and in his time, and partly thanks to his efforts, the congregation, which also bears his name, was established by 1851.

== Ministers ==
- Carl Arnoldus Bamberger, 1854–1882 (emeritus; died on 21 April 1892)
- Pieter Daniël Rossouw, 1883 – 11 October 1896 (died in office)
- Former Sypkens, 1897–1906 (retired due to ill health)
- Marthinus Smuts Daneel, 1 October 1906 – 12 February 1914
- Johannes Wynand Louw Hofmeyr, 1914–1917
- Johannes Gerhardus Olivier, 1918–1925
- Carel Hendrik Kruger, 1925–1948
- Ignatius Ferreira Retief, 1949–1959
- Nicolaas Salomo Steenkamp, 1960–1966
- Archibald Rothman, 1967–1971
- Dr. Kobus Victor, 1972–1974
- Dr. Adelbert Scholtz, 1974–1981
- Dr. Eduan Naude, 1981–1984
- Paul Roos-Jonker, 1984–1988
- Johan Basson, January 1989 – June 2011
- Wessel Oosthuizen, 2011 – 2016
- Frederich (Fritz) Kotzé, 27 May 2016 – 2019

== Sources ==
- (in Afrikaans) Kotzé, D.A. 1951. Die Gemeente Fraserburg. 'n Eeufees-gedenkboek (1851–1951). Fraserburg: NG Kerkraad.
- (in Afrikaans) Nienaber, P.J. 1949. Hier Is Ons Skrywers! Biografiese Sketse van Afrikaanse Skrywers. Johannesburg: Afrikaanse Pers-Boekhandel.
- (in Afrikaans) Olivier, ds. P.L.. 1952. Ons gemeentelike feesalbum. Kaapstad en Pretoria: N.G. Kerk-uitgewers.
- (in Afrikaans) Van Wijk, mev. A.J. 1964. Vroue-Sendingbond Kaapland. Na vyf-en-sewentig jaar 1889–1964. Kaapstad: Die Hoofbestuur van die Vroue-Sendingbond.
