= Karoo Hoogland Local Municipality =

Karoo Hoogland
- Local municipality
- Seal

- Location in the Northern Cape
- Coordinates: 31°45′S 21°15′E
- Country: South Africa
- Province: Northern Cape
- District: Namakwa
- Seat: Williston
- Wards: 6

Government
  - Type: Municipal council
  - Mayor: Anthony Mietas (PA)

Area
  - Total: 32,274 km^{2} (12,461 sq mi)

Population (2022)
  - Total: 11,691
  - Density: 0.36224/km^{2} (0.93820/sq mi)

Racial makeup (2022)
  - Coloured: 83.8%
  - White: 12.8%
  - Black African: 2.3%
  - Indian/Asian: 0.9%

First languages (2011)
  - Afrikaans: 96.3%
  - English: 1.3%
  - Other: 2.4%
- Time zone: UTC+2 (SAST)
- Municipal code: NC066

Karoo Hoogland Municipality (Afrikaans: Karoo Hoogland Munisipaliteit) is a local municipality within the Namakwa District Municipality, in the Northern Cape province of South Africa. The municipality incorporates the towns of Williston, Fraserburg and Sutherland. Although the towns are separated by more than 100 km by road, they share many administrative tasks.

Hoogland is an Afrikaans word meaning "highland" and Karoo is a Khoekhoe word meaning "hard" or "dry". The name reflects the area which has dry, arid and desert-like conditions.

In 2011, Karoo Hoogland elected the first mayor from the Congress of the People (COPE) party, Jan Julies, and a COPE-DA coalition took control of the council after the election of 18 May 2011. This lasted until the 2016 elections.

== Main places ==
The 2011 census divided the municipality into the following main places:

Place	Code	Area (km^{2})	Population
Fraserburg	367003	98.9	3,029
Sutherland	367004	36.0	2,836
Williston	367001	77.9	3,368
Remainder	367002	32,061.1	3,356
Total		32,273.9	12,588

== Demographics ==
According to the 2022 South African census, the municipality had a population of 11,691 people. Of these, 83.8% identified as "Coloured," 12.8% as "White," and 2.3% as "Black African."

== Politics ==
The municipal council consists of eleven members elected by mixed-member proportional representation. Six councillors are elected by first-past-the-post voting in six wards, while the remaining five are chosen from party lists so that the total number of party representatives is proportional to the number of votes received. In the election of 1 November 2021 no party obtained a majority of seats on the council. The following table shows the results of the election.

Karoo Hoogland local election, 1 November 2021
Party	Votes				Seats		
Party	Ward	List	Total	%	Ward	List	Total
African National Congress	1,815	1,803	3,618	40.8%	3	2	5
Democratic Alliance	1,337	1,335	2,672	30.2%	3	0	3
Patriotic Alliance	962	994	1,956	22.1%	0	2	2
Freedom Front Plus	229	225	454	5.1%	0	1	1
Congress of the People	42	60	102	1.2%	0	0	0
Economic Freedom Fighters	29	29	58	0.7%	0	0	0
Total	4,414	4,446	8,860		6	5	11
Valid votes	4,414	4,446	8,860	98.7%			
Spoilt votes	64	57	121	1.3%			
Total votes cast	4,478	4,503	8,981				
Voter turnout	4,507						
Registered voters	7,250						
Turnout percentage	62.2%						

On 8 December 2022 the PA/ANC coalition collapsed during a no confidence motion brought by the DA. Consequently the PA mayor Anthony Mietas was replaced by the DA’s Johan van der Colff.
