= Prince Albert, South Africa =

Prince Albert Prins Albert
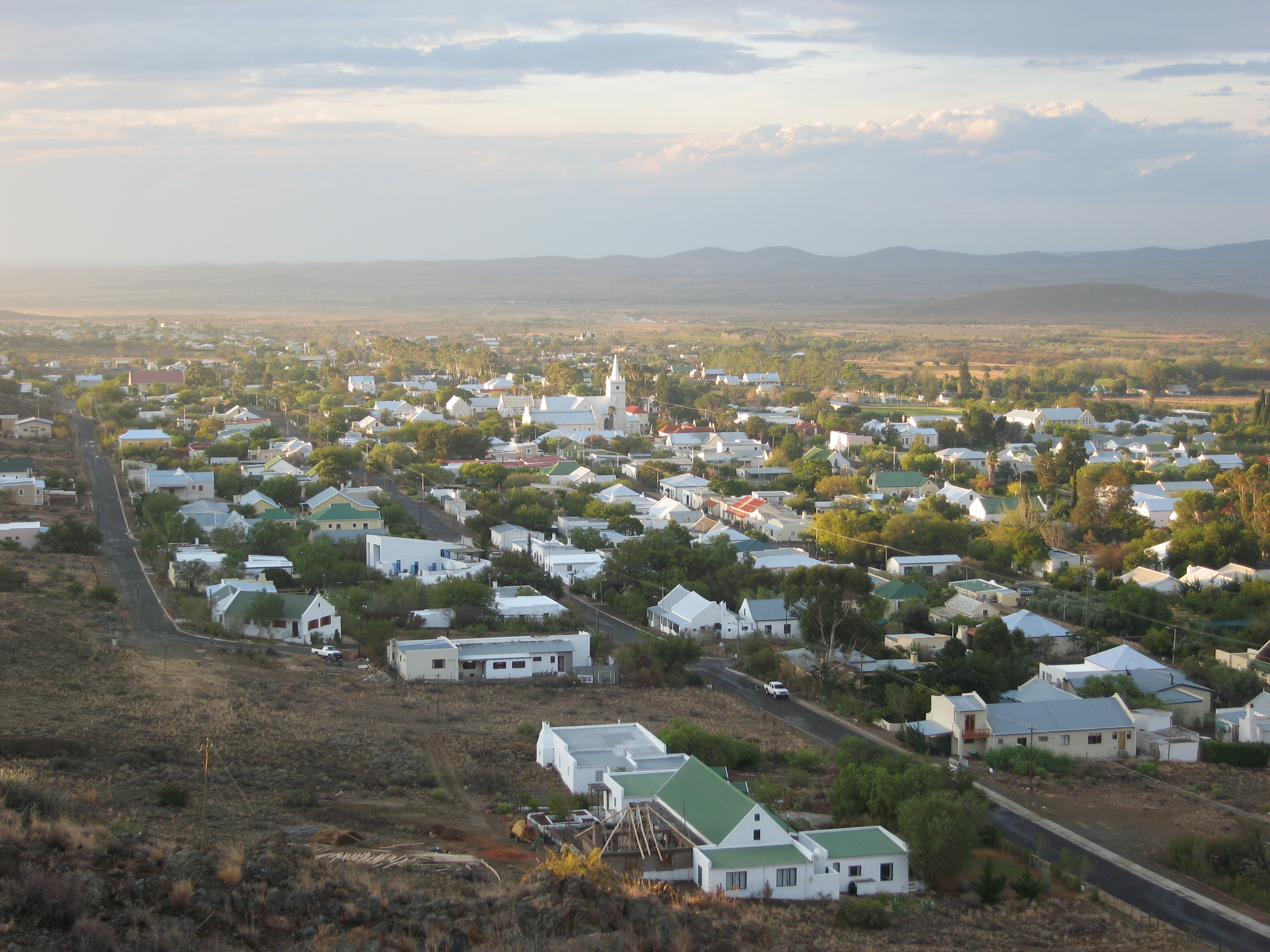
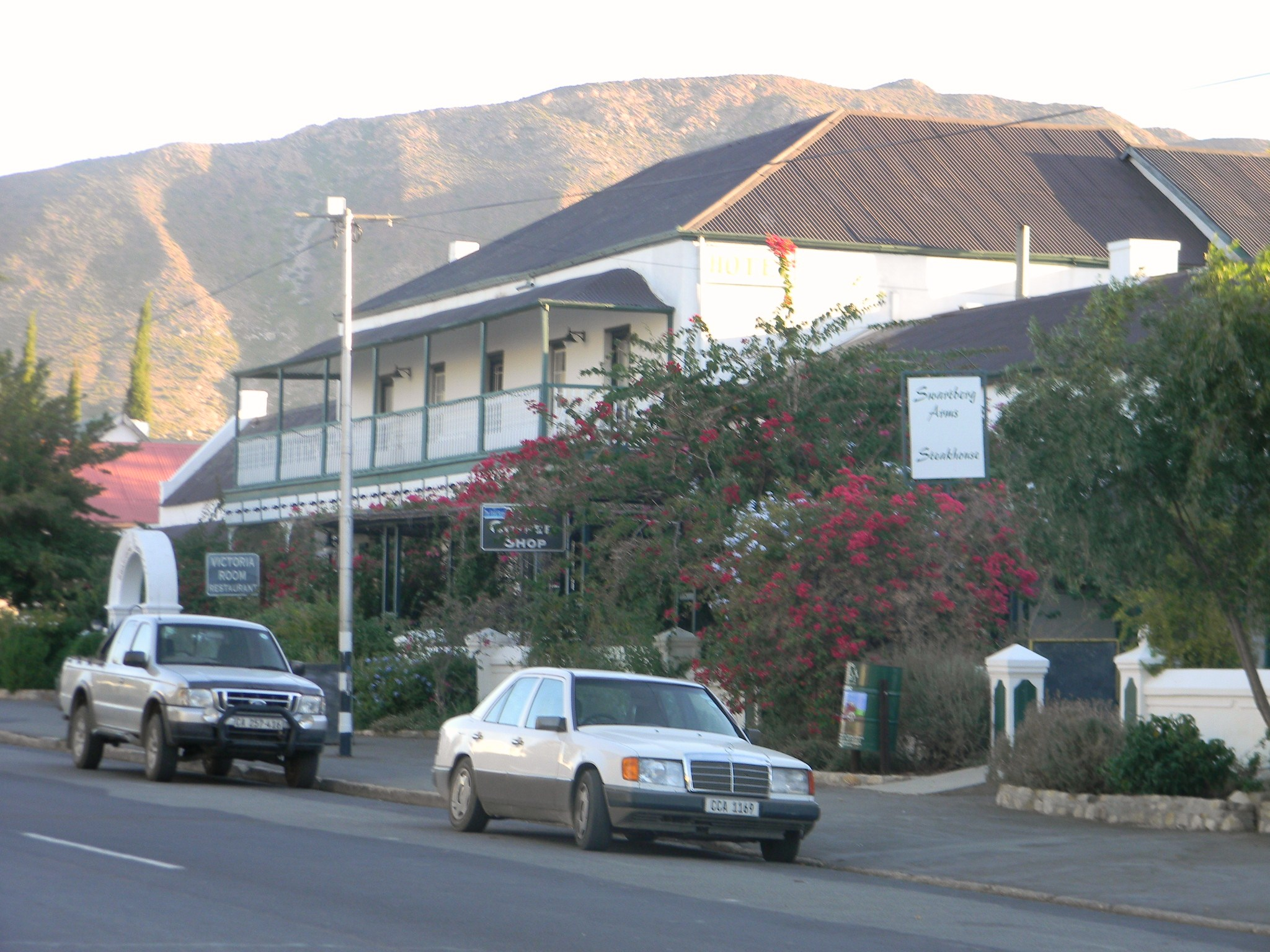
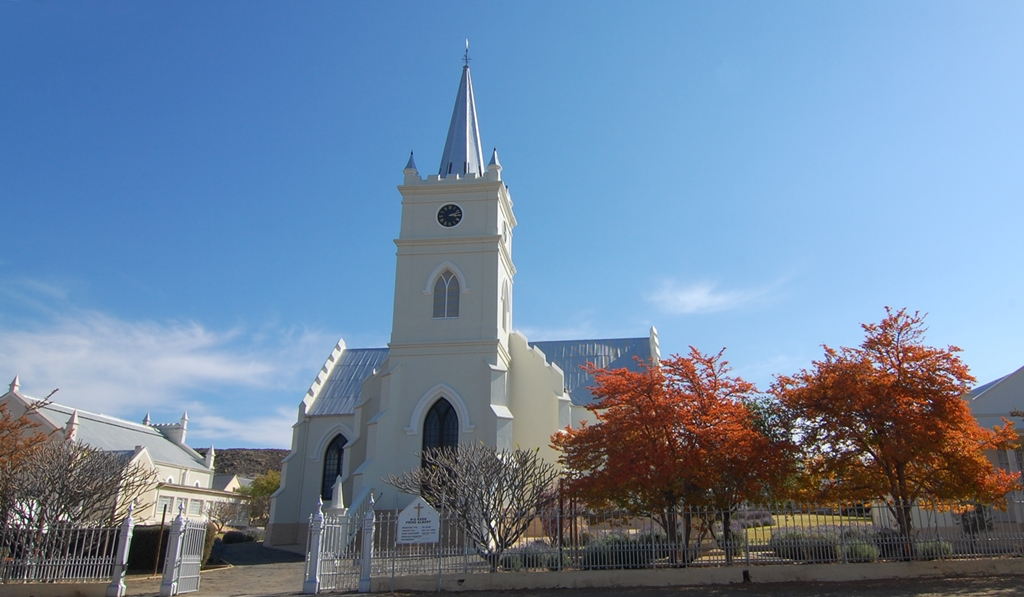
- Top: View overlooking Prince Albert. Left: the Swartberg Hotel. Right: Prince Albert Dutch Reformed Church.

- Location within Western Cape Location within South Africa
- Coordinates: 33°13′31″S 22°01′48″E
- Country: South Africa
- Province: Western Cape
- District: Central Karoo
- Municipality: Prince Albert
- Established: 1842

Area
  - Total: 37.70 km^{2} (14.56 sq mi)

Population (2011)
  - Total: 7,054
  - Density: 187.1/km^{2} (484.6/sq mi)

Racial makeup (2011)
  - Black African: 2.2%
  - Coloured: 85.7%
  - Indian/Asian: 0.2%
  - White: 11.3%
  - Other: 0.6%

First languages (2011)
  - Afrikaans: 91.7%
  - English: 4.7%
  - Other: 3.6%
- Time zone: UTC+2 (SAST)
- Postal code (street): 6930
- PO box: 6930
- Area code: 023

Prince Albert (Afrikaans: Prins Albert) is a small town in the Western Cape in South Africa. It is located on the southern edge of the Great Karoo, at the foot of the Swartberg mountains. In recent years the moniker the "Franschhoek of the Karoo" has been used to describe the town's appeal to the art community and wealthier South Africans, many of whom have become residents of the town.

== History ==
Prince Albert was founded in 1762 on a farm called Queekvalleij. Originally known as Albertsburg, when it obtained municipal status in 1845 it was renamed Prince Albert in honour of Queen Victoria's consort, Prince Albert of Saxe-Coburg. Prince Albert was historically part of the Cape Colony.

During the latter part of the century, a nugget of gold was discovered on a farm in the area. Due to the fact that a similar occurrence had led to the Gold Rush in the Witwatersrand, this new discovery precipitated a similar population boom. However, the gold yield turned out to be minimal. Prince Albert became a British garrison during the Second Boer War in 1899. The town was the site of several clashes between the British and the Boers during this period.

== Economy ==
The town has a GINI coefficient of 0.56, and a Human Development Index of 0.68. Around 20% of the town's working age population is unemployed. The total size of the town's GDPR in 2015 was R418 million (roughly equivalent to US$34.3 million). The three largest economic sectors by value in the town's economy being government services (21%), agriculture (19%), and retail and tourism (15%). Agriculture provides about one third of all jobs in the town with retail and tourism being the second largest employer by sector accounting for 18% of all jobs provided.

The town hosts a number of private art galleries and relatively large community of artists. Since the mid-1990s the town has experienced an economic boom which has been driven by the increasing number of artists and retirees moving to it.

== Points of interest ==
Prince Albert has a small local population, mainly engaged in farming and tourism. The village has thirteen National Monuments.

== In popular culture ==
- Prince Albert and the surrounding area is an important location and destination in the 1983 novel, Life & Times of Michael K by J. M. Coetzee
