= Fraserburg =

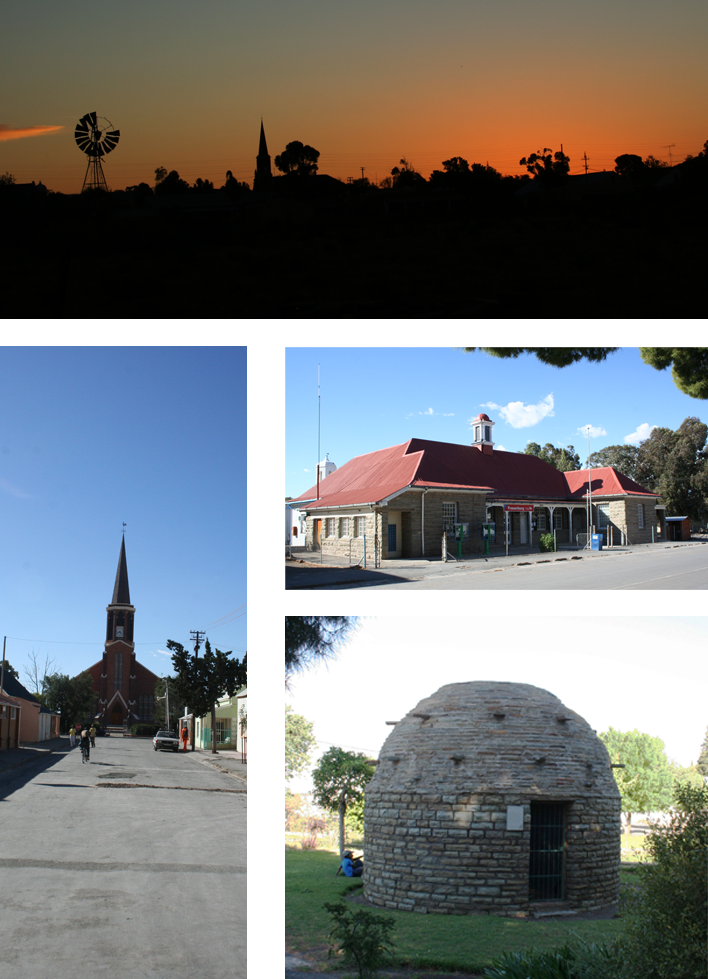
- Top: skyline of Fraserburg at dusk. Left: the Dutch Reformed Church on the main street. Middle right: town's post office. Bottom right: a corbelled house built by Trekboers before the town was established.

- Location within Northern Cape Location within South Africa Location within Africa
- Coordinates: 31°54′52″S 21°30′43″E
- Country: South Africa
- Province: Northern Cape
- District: Namakwa
- Municipality: Karoo Hoogland

Area
  - Total: 98.88 km^{2} (38.18 sq mi)

Population (2011)
  - Total: 3,029
  - Density: 30.63/km^{2} (79.34/sq mi)

Racial makeup (2011)
  - Black African: 4.8%
  - Coloured: 84.8%
  - Indian/Asian: 0.6%
  - White: 9.5%
  - Other: 0.3%

First languages (2011)
  - Afrikaans: 95.8%
  - Xhosa: 1.3%
  - Other: 3.0%
- Time zone: UTC+2 (SAST)
- Postal code (street): 6960
- PO box: 6960
- Area code: 023

Fraserburg is a town in the Karoo region of South Africa's Northern Cape province. It is located in the Karoo Hoogland Local Municipality. The town has some of the coldest winters in South Africa.

The nearest towns are Williston, Sutherland, Loxton and Leeu-Gamka, all of which are more than 100 km distant.

A particularly good example of a corbelled house can be found in the town, there are others in the district. The town is also well known for the large number of unique and well-preserved fossil finds that litter the surrounding area.

== History ==
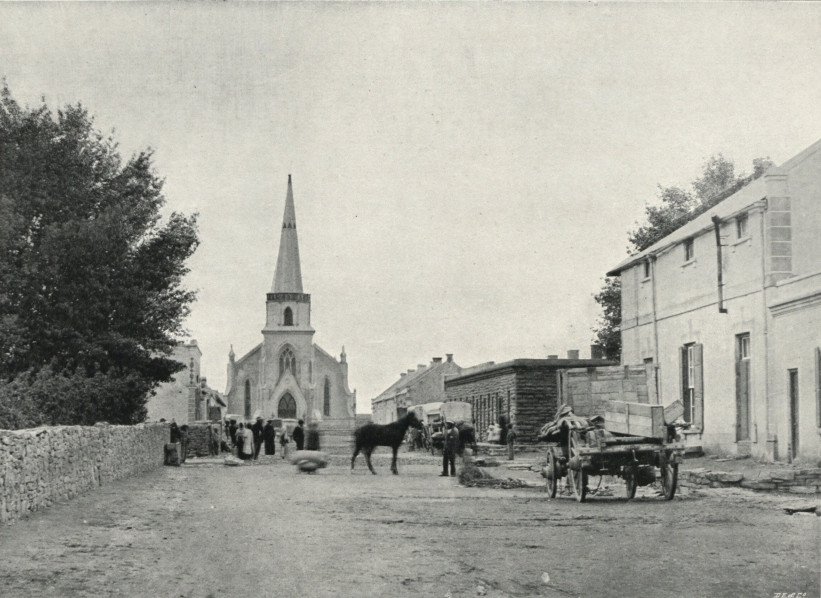
A photograph down the main road running from Leeu Gamka of the old Dutch Reformed Church in 1899

The earliest known inhabitants of the area were the San people and their artefacts and rock paintings can still be found in the area. The first Europeans to arrive in the region were Trekboers who arrived in 1759. The first settler to be recorded in these parts was Willem Steenkamp, after whom the Steenkampsberg is named. In 1851 Fraserburg was established on the farm Rietfontein and named after the Scottish immigrant Reverend Colin Fraser.

A post office was established in 1858, seven years after the town's founding, this led to an era of development for the area. In 1859 a magistrates office was opened and in 1860 a police station was opened and the town's first medical doctor arrived. In 1861 a prison was opened in the town, it closed 107 years later in 1968. In 1870 the town's first attorney and noted Afrikaans author, H. W. A. Cooper, moved to the town where he wrote the "Boerebrieven" in the Afrikaans newspaper Het Volksblad, writing under the pseudonym Samuel Zwaartman.

The town was declared a municipality on June 6, 1862.

There are many Victorian era houses in the town dating to the era of the ostrich feather and wool booms of the late 19th and early 20th centuries.

In 1861 the town's distinctive hexagonal stone bell tower was built. Known as The Pepperpot due to its distinctive shape, the 9-meter-tall (30 ft) structure and was used as the magistrate’s private office, the Market Master’s office and functioned as the town's first library.

In 1870 a powder magazine, which still stands on the edge of town, was built by the British army in case of war with the neighbouring Griqua people and was used during the Anglo-Boer War. In 1938 the town's first power station was installed with 7 Lister Blackstone generators -still present- used to power the town at the time it was connected to the national grid in 1983.

== Fossil deposits ==
In 1968 on a nearby farm a number of very well preserved fossilised footsteps were discovered dating back 250 million years to the Permian Period, most notable of which is a very well preserved Bradysaurus footprint. Since then a number of fossilised remains of other pre-dinosaur creatures such as Pareiasaurs, Dinocephalians, and Therapsids have been discovered in an area regarded as one of the best paleontological sites in South Africa.

Fossils of some of the following Permian period reptiles have been found in the area:

- Pareiasaurus
- Diictodon
- Struthiocephalus

== Geography ==
Fraserburg is situated at an altitude of 1,385 metres (4,544 ft) above sea level on a high Karoo plateau, north of the Nuweveld Mountains.

Similar to -although not to the same extent as- nearby Sutherland, Fraserburg's arid climate and remote location make its night skies among the world's clearest and darkest. The telescopes of the South African Astronomical Observatory 32°22′46″S 20°48′38.5″E list located roughly 95 km to the west of the town just outside Sutherland. These include the Southern African Large Telescope (SALT), the largest single optical telescope in the southern hemisphere.

=== Climate ===
Fraserburg has an average yearly temperature of 13.9 °C and an average annual minimum temperature of 6 °C; Snowfall is common in winter. On average the town's warmest month is January with an average temperature of 21.7 °C, the coolest month tends to be June, with an average temperature of 6.7 °C. Fraserburg has a Tropical and Subtropical Desert Climate (Köppen climate classification BWk).

Climate data for Fraserburg, elevation 1,268 m (4,160 ft), (1991–2020 normals, extremes 2006–2023)
| Month | Jan | Feb | Mar | Apr | May | Jun | Jul | Aug | Sep | Oct | Nov | Dec | Year |
|---|---|---|---|---|---|---|---|---|---|---|---|---|---|
| Record high °C (°F) | 42.4 (108.3) | 42.0 (107.6) | 37.2 (99.0) | 33.7 (92.7) | 29.6 (85.3) | 25.9 (78.6) | 24.9 (76.8) | 30.0 (86.0) | 34.1 (93.4) | 38.0 (100.4) | 39.6 (103.3) | 39.1 (102.4) | 42.4 (108.3) |
| Mean daily maximum °C (°F) | 34.1 (93.4) | 33.3 (91.9) | 30.9 (87.6) | 26.0 (78.8) | 22.1 (71.8) | 17.6 (63.7) | 18.0 (64.4) | 20.2 (68.4) | 23.6 (74.5) | 27.6 (81.7) | 29.3 (84.7) | 32.2 (90.0) | 26.2 (79.2) |
| Daily mean °C (°F) | 24.7 (76.5) | 24.1 (75.4) | 21.8 (71.2) | 17.2 (63.0) | 13.6 (56.5) | 9.5 (49.1) | 9.2 (48.6) | 10.6 (51.1) | 13.6 (56.5) | 17.9 (64.2) | 19.8 (67.6) | 22.9 (73.2) | 17.1 (62.7) |
| Mean daily minimum °C (°F) | 15.4 (59.7) | 14.9 (58.8) | 12.6 (54.7) | 8.3 (46.9) | 5.1 (41.2) | 1.3 (34.3) | 0.4 (32.7) | 1.0 (33.8) | 3.6 (38.5) | 8.1 (46.6) | 10.4 (50.7) | 13.5 (56.3) | 7.9 (46.2) |
| Record low °C (°F) | 6.8 (44.2) | 6.0 (42.8) | 3.7 (38.7) | 0.2 (32.4) | −4.5 (23.9) | −6.4 (20.5) | −7.9 (17.8) | −6.4 (20.5) | −3.9 (25.0) | −0.5 (31.1) | 1.5 (34.7) | 2.5 (36.5) | −7.9 (17.8) |
| Average precipitation mm (inches) | 19.2 (0.76) | 26.4 (1.04) | 32.5 (1.28) | 20.9 (0.82) | 14.3 (0.56) | 10.2 (0.40) | 8.1 (0.32) | 7.4 (0.29) | 7.9 (0.31) | 8.9 (0.35) | 11.9 (0.47) | 12.4 (0.49) | 180.1 (7.09) |
| Average precipitation days (≥ 0.25 mm) | 2.4 | 2.9 | 4.3 | 3.5 | 3.1 | 2.9 | 2.0 | 2.1 | 1.7 | 2.0 | 1.9 | 1.9 | 30.7 |
Source: Starlings Roost Weather (precipitation 1878–2023)

== Notable residents ==
Notable residents of Fraserburg include:

- A.G. Visser, famous Afrikaans poet was born in Fraserburg.
- Jan S. Marais, banker and politician was born in Fraserburg.
- Pieter Daniel Rossouw (1845 – 1896), theologen and Afrikaans writer, spent the last 13 years of his life in Fraserburg
- Katie Stuart (reformer) (1862-1925), British South African evangelist and temperance leader; was born in Fraserburg.
