= Vehicle registration plates of South Africa =

South Africa
- Country: South Africa
- Country code: ZA

Current series
- Size: 520 mm × 110 mm 20.5 in × 4.3 in
- Serial format: Will depend on the Province
- Colour (front): Will depend on the Province
- Colour (rear): Will depend on the Province

In South Africa, vehicle registration plates, known as number plates, are issued by the Department of Transport in each of its provinces. Each province has plates with unique designs, colour schemes, and alphanumeric patterns. For instance, the plates display combinations like CB 12 CD GP or CA 123–456, with distinct variations in layout and formatting across different regions of the country.

== History ==
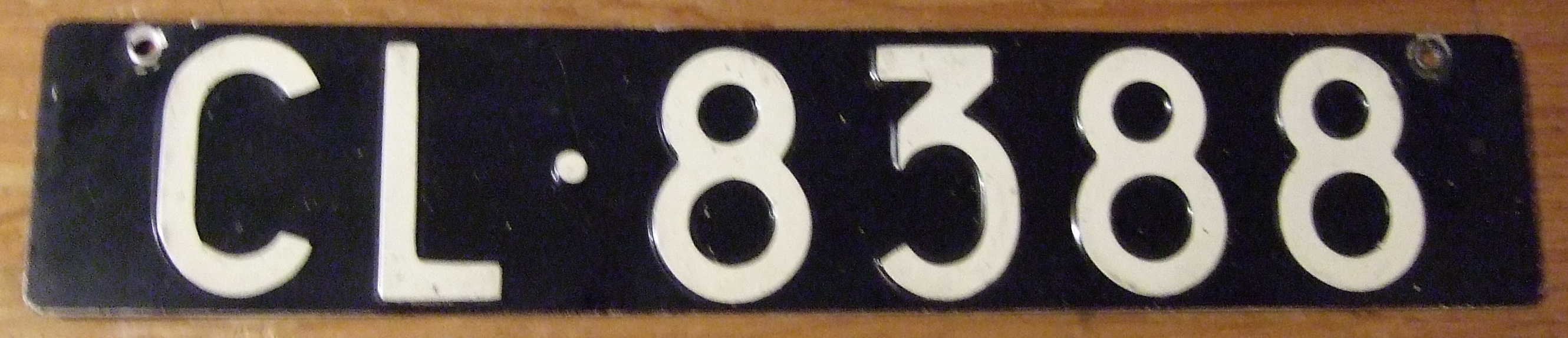
A 1963 plate from Cape Province

Until 1914, each municipality or local management board issued its own registration numbers, which naturally led to overlaps and confusion. The first national system was inspired by the British one, using white letters on a black background with each province using its own leading letter - major towns received two-letter combos, while smaller towns and municipalities used three-letter combinations.

From 1 February 2000, a process started to replace all number plates in South Africa to an aluminium number plate with an RFID tag containing a unique identification code, including the ability to identify the number plate in a foreign nation. This is termed an Intelligent Number Plate system. The system has been implemented for additional and circumstantial use. The numbering structure on plates will also then change. Concerning the foreign identification system within South Africa, foreigners are granted the permission to verify their number plate to the South African number plate system.

The Department of Transport in South Africa has set aside R25 million for the project during the 2015/2016 fiscal year. The Department of Transport in KwaZulu-Natal has set aside R1.5 million for vehicle registration plates for the province. A secure electronic mark will be used in the encryption of the code. The system can automatically generate the details of driving offences committed by a driver.

As of January 2022, new vehicles are, however, still being fitted with plastic plates and the system has still not been implemented.

New legislation also requires that a new vehicle's number plate be fixed to the body of the vehicle, or an approved number plate holder, with four 4 mm rivets.

== Development ==
=== Material ===
Number plates are available in plastic or metal. Plastic is the preferred material used by the majority of the motorists. They are also more common than their metal counterpart and are issued as standard plates by car dealerships, except in Gauteng Province where, from 2013, newly issued plates must be metal.

=== Shape ===
The most common size is identical to the European number plates' size (113 mm × 520 mm (4.4 in × 20.5 in)). However, a shorter plate is also common (120 mm × 440 mm (4.7 in × 17.3 in)). Most car dealerships now issue the former. Other shapes such as American and motorbike sizes are also available. Number plates can be made over the counter at registration/licensing stores in shopping centres, although the vehicle registration document may be required.

=== Costs ===
The standard annual non-personalised licence fee is between R250 and R600, depending on the province in which the vehicle is registered and the weight of the vehicle. A large number of heavy vehicles are registered in Northern and Eastern Cape where the licence fees per vehicle mass are low. The Western Cape has the most expensive annual licence fees, but as with Northern and Eastern Cape, it has few toll roads.

Vehicle owners can buy specific personalised registration numbers from registering authorities. The cost for a single digit registration e.g. CA 1 will be in the region of R6000 while a long number e.g. CA 123456 can be as low as R600.

== Provinces ==
=== Overview ===
Province	Standard Plates	Personalised Plates	Example	Colouring	Graphics
Western Cape Province	Caa #	xzzzzzz WP	CAA 123-456	Black on white (Black on yellow still legal)	None
KwaZulu-Natal Province	aa++aa ZN	xzzzzzz ZN	BL 00 MY ZN	Blue on white; Black on white for vehicles transporting people for rewards; Red on white for Government vehicles	Provincial coat of arms
Mpumalanga Province	aaa+++ MP	xzzzzz MP	BCD 123 MP	Black on white	Stylised rising sun
Eastern Cape Province	aaa+++ EC	xzzzzz EC	BCD 123 EC	Black on graphic	Elephant and aloe
Limpopo Province	aaa+++ L	xzzzzz L	BCD 123 L	Black on white	Baobab tree and provincial coat of arms
Gauteng Province	aa++aa GP	xzzzzzz GP	GR 00 VY GP	Blue on white	Provincial coat of arms
Northern Cape Province	aaa+++ NC	xzzzzz NC	BBC 123 NC	Green on white	Gemsbok and sand dune
Free State Province	aaa+++ FS	xzzzzz FS	BBC 123 FS	Black on graphic; Green on graphic (for personalised)	Cheetah
North West Province	aaa+++ NW	xzzzzz NW	BBC 123 NW	Black on graphic	Maize cob, elephant, sunflower and mine headgear
Diplomatic vehicles	+++(D or C or X or S) +++D [Old] (D or C or X or S) BBa +++ D [New]	None	C BBN 371 D	Red (for D plates) or Green (for C, X and S plates) on White	None
National and provincial government vehicles	Gaa+++ G	None	GBC 123 G	Black on yellow	None
South African Police Service vehicles	Baa+++ B	None	BCB 123 B	Black on white / blue on white (Gauteng & KwaZulu Natal)	None / Gauteng provincial coat of arms
South African National Defence Force vehicles	aaa+++ M	None	BCB 123 M	Black on yellow	None

- In the Eastern Cape, provincial government vehicles (especially Health Department) have red letters and a red frame on white.
- Limpopo was initially named Northern Province and used the code N. When the name changed, a new sequence of numbers began, ending in L.
- The Gauteng, KwaZulu-Natal and Western Cape province offers personalised number plates up to a maximum of 7 characters as opposed to the traditional (and those of other provinces) 6 character limit.

Key:

- UPPER CASE LETTERS: Literal letters in the number plate
- a: compulsory letter (A – Z)
- b: letter (A – Z) or nothing
- x: compulsory character (A – Z, 0 – 9)
- z: character (A – Z, 0 – 9) or nothing
- #: an integer number (1 – 999,999)
- +: a compulsory digit (0 – 9)
- NB: Vowels are not used on private vehicles.

After 1994, the Western Cape Province and KwaZulu-Natal Province are the only two provinces where the registration can be still linked to specific towns and cities. i.e. The pre-1980 system has largely been retained in these areas, so the first two or three letters at the start of each number plate identify where the vehicle was licensed. However, the KwaZulu-Natal province changed its system into a provincial numbering system in December 2023.

=== Western Cape ===
Map of the registration prefixes in the Western Cape

In 1994, the Cape Province was subdivided into three provinces (Western, Eastern and Northern Cape provinces). The Eastern and Northern Cape changed their licensing system so the Cape Province registration prefixes used there, like CB (Port Elizabeth) and CC (Kimberley), were dropped. The homeland states of Ciskei and Transkei became part of the Eastern Cape. The Stellaland district (Vryburg) became part of North West Province. The current Western Cape Province list is essentially an abbreviation of the pre-1980 Cape Province list.

Western Cape Province
Registration	Location
CA or CAA	Cape Town Afrikaans: Kaapstad, Xhosa: iKapa (CAA was first introduced on 13 April 2019 when Cape Town ran out of CA combinations).
CAM	Caledon, Villiersdorp, Riviersonderend, Kleinmond
CAR	Clanwilliam, Lambert's Bay, Citrusdal, Graafwater
CAW or CAG	George (When the George area ran out of CAW combinations in late 2019, CAG started being issued. CAG used to be the code for Barkly West, Northern Cape which now uses NC).
CBL	Ladismith
CBM	Laingsburg
CBR	Montagu
CBS	Mossel Bay & Hartenbos. Afrikaans: Mosselbaai.
CBT	Murraysburg
CBY	Piketberg
CCA	Prince Albert Afrikaans: Prins Albert.
CCC	Riversdale & Stilbaai. Afrikaans: Riversdal.
CCD	Robertson & McGregor
CCK	Swellendam & Barrydale
CCM	Tulbagh
CCO	Uniondale
CCP	Van Rhynsdorp, Klawer. Afrikaans: Vanrhynsdorp.
CEA	Moorreesburg
CEG	Heidelberg
CEM	Hermanus, Gansbaai, Onrus River & Stanford
CEO	Grabouw & Elgin
CER	Bonnievale
CES	Albertinia
CEX	Porterville
CEY	Strand & Gordon's Bay. Now part of the City of Cape Town.
CF	Kuils River, Brackenfell, Kraaifontein (Since about 2000; previously the code for Grahamstown, Eastern Cape). Now part of the City of Cape Town. Afrikaans: Kuilsrivier
CFA	Wolseley
CFG	Vredenburg, Saldanha & St Helena Bay
CFM	Somerset West. Now part of the City of Cape Town.
CFP	Velddrif & Laaiplek
CFR	Kuils River & Brackenfell (Still seen on older vehicles.) Now part of the City of Cape Town. Afrikaans: Kuilsrivier
CG	Oudtshoorn
CJ	Paarl
CK	Malmesbury & Darling
CL	Stellenbosch & Klapmuts & Franschhoek
CN	Wellington
CO	Calitzdorp
CR	Hopefield, Langebaan & Langebaan Road
CS	Cape Agulhas Municipality (Bredasdorp, Cape Agulhas, Struisbaai, Napier, Arniston)
CT	Ceres
CV	Vredendal
CW	Worcester, De Doorns & Touws River
CX	Knysna, Sedgefield & Plettenberg Bay
CY	Bellville, Durbanville, Parow, Goodwood. Now part of the City of Cape Town.
CZ	Beaufort West
CCT	City of Cape Town (official municipal) vehicles. Previously the code for Willowmore, Eastern Cape.

=== KwaZulu-Natal ===
KwaZulu-Natal as of 1 December 2023 introduced new number plate numbering system. All new vehicles will be using the alphanumeric format (e.g. BB 00 CC ZN). The colour of the licence plates is blue over white. The old town specific numbering system is being phased out over 21 months period beginning 1 March 2024, and all motorists renewing from 1 December 2024 are automatically switched over to the new format. All motorists are required to change over to the new numbering system by 30 November March 2025. From 1 December 2025 motorists that have not changed over will be fined by the law enforcement. The new number plates in KwaZulu-Natal will in future use the alphanumeric format. For personalized plates, e.g. ND 1234 will in future be ND 1234 ZN. The old green personalised plates (ZN) will also change to blue over white plates.

KwaZulu-Natal Province
Registration	Location
NA	Harding
NB	Bergville
NBA	Babanango
NC	Camperdown, Hammarsdale
NCO	Colenso
NCW	Kokstad
ND	Durban
NDE	Dundee
NDH	Dannhauser
NDW	Ndwedwe
NE	Estcourt
NES	Eshowe
NF	Msinga
NGL	Glencoe
NH	New Hannover
NHL	Hlabisa, Mtubatuba, Hluhluwe
NIM	Impendle
NIN	Ingwavuma
NIP	Bulwer
NIX	Ixopo
NJ	Inanda, Ntuzuma, KwaMashu, Verulam, Tongaat.
NK	Richmond
NKA	Nkandla
NKK	Kranskop
NKR	Ladysmith
NKU	Ulundi
NM	Maphumulo
NMA	Mahlabatini
NMG	Magudu
NMR	Mooi River
NMZ	Umzimkhulu Previously part of the Cape (code CDP) and then of Transkei (XH), as an enclave in Natal. Transferred to KwaZulu-Natal in 2006.
NN	Newcastle
NND	Nongoma
NO	Melmoth
NP	Pietermaritzburg
NPG	Pongola This town, on the north bank of the Phongolo River, used to be part of the Transvaal panhandle between Eswatini and Natal, with its border on the Phongolo. It used the code TAG (Piet Retief).
NPN	Pinetown
NPP	Paulpietersburg
NR	Lions River, Howick
NRB	Richards Bay
NS	Ngotshe
NPS or NSC	Port Shepstone, Hibberdene, Margate, Port Edward, Southbroom (Port Shepstone was NPS prior to 30 June 2020, after which it was changed to NSC.)
NT	Stanger & Ballito
NTU	Nquthu
NU	New Germany, Hillcrest, Kloof, Gillitts.
NUB	Ubombo
NUD	Underberg
NUF	Empangeni
NUL	Umbumbulu
NUM	Greytown
NUR	Umhlanga, Umdloti, La Lucia
NUT	Utrecht
NUZ	Umlazi
NV	Vryheid
NW	Weenen
NX	Mthwalume, Umzinto, Scottburgh, Umkomaas
NZ	Mtunzini, Gingindlovu

Provincial and Local Government	Location
KDM	KwaDukuza Municipality
KZN	KwaZulu-Natal Provincial Government
NCS	KwaZulu-Natal Conservative Center
NDM	eThekwini Metropolitan Municipality
NPC	Msunduzi Municipality, Pietermaritzburg

=== Free State ===
The Free State is the only province in South Africa that places an expiry date on its registration plate. Every five years the owner is required to replace the plate irrespective of condition. This is only enforced in the Free State and if the owner uses the vehicle with "expired" plates in any other province he/she will not be prosecuted. This expiry is independent from the annual licence renewal required by national law. This is the only province in the country that has the same borders today as it did before the Boer War, although it has had three changes of name. It was the Orange Free State (a Boer republic), the Orange River Colony (1902–1910), the Orange Free State Province (Provinsie Oranje Vrystaat, 1910–1994) and is now simply the Free State.

=== North West ===
A new numbering system was announced in December 2015, which would be implemented in February 2016.

=== Gauteng ===
Gauteng's format typically uses two letters, 2 numbers and another two letters and the provincial code "GP" (e.g. BC 12 DF GP), as of 2023, as opposed to the pre three letters followed by up to three digits and the provincial code "GP" (e.g. BCD 123 GP) which has been in use since the early 1990s but was changed due to the high volume of vehicle registrations. It replaced the older Transvaal system after the province was split and renamed following the end of apartheid.

The "GP" suffix stands for Gauteng Province, which includes major cities such as Johannesburg, Pretoria, and Ekurhuleni. The system is administered centrally by the Gauteng Department of Transport. Historically, cities in Gauteng used unique prefixes under the Transvaal administration, such as TJ for Johannesburg and TP for Pretoria. These were phased out by the mid-1990s.

As of 2025 Gauteng has introduced a new "Smart" licence plate system featuring tamper-evident decals, forensic QR codes, and SADC-compatible digital integration. The initiative began with a six‑month pilot on government fleet vehicles, transitioning to public release by early 2026.

== Legal requirements ==
All vehicles in South Africa, excluding motorcycles, are required to display a number plate on the front and the rear of the vehicle. For vehicles that cannot accommodate a full size plate in front, a plate with smaller dimensions may be fitted with permission from the registering authority.

The validation of a vehicle's registration number is indicated by a licence disc displayed inside the vehicle's windshield and must be visible from the passenger side of the vehicle. The vehicle's registration number, VIN and engine number as well as the licence expiry date, vehicle weight and number of passengers the vehicle is allowed to carry is indicated on the disc.

In the Western Cape, where the registration number is indicative of the town of registration, the registration number will not change when the owner of the vehicle relocates to another town in the same province. It is required of the owner to inform the authorities of a change of address within 21 days. However, if the owner relocates to another province, the owner has to register the vehicle in that province within 21 days. Whenever a vehicle is registered in a new owner's name, the vehicle will receive the registration of the new owner's town. If the vehicle is registered in the same town as the current registration, no change of registration number takes place.

When a vehicle changes ownership it is required that the vehicle be taken for a roadworthy test. The new owner is allowed to use a vehicle for a period of 21 days on the previous owner's registration before the vehicle has to be registered in the new owner's name. If the roadworthy result cannot be obtained within this period, the owner may register the vehicle without being roadworthy, however a licence disc will not be issued and the vehicle may not be used on a public road. A temporary permit must be obtained from the registering authority to drive the vehicle to the testing station or repair shop. The permit is valid for three days.

When a person buys a vehicle from a dealer in another province or town other than the one they live in, a temporary permit valid for three weeks is issued by the registration authorities. A vehicle can only be registered in the town the owner lives in. It is also not possible to renew the licence in any other town than the town the registered owner lives in.

The temporary permit is a cardboard "number plate" to be displayed in either the front or rear window of the vehicle.

When a vehicle's engine is replaced or the VIN and engine number needs to be verified for some legal reason, the vehicle needs to obtain police clearance. Since September 2012, a vehicle can only obtain a clearance if it was marked with a micro dot, or data dot system. This is a process where about 10,000 micro dots with a serial number on is sprayed with a resin onto all components of the vehicle. This serial number is linked to the vehicle's VIN on the national registration database. These dots can be found with an ultraviolet light and when magnified the serial number can be traced. New vehicles are treated in the factory and the dots carry the vehicle's VIN. This is to assist the authorities in identifying a vehicle or any part thereof when VIN and engine numbers are not legible, or have been removed.

Legislation is also on the table to have micro dotting made compulsory for all vehicles changing owners as well as requiring a 2-yearly roadworthy status for vehicles older than 10 years. The downside of this is that it might cause many poorer South Africans not to register vehicles in their name or to let licences lapse and just pay the fine when getting caught.

It is illegal in South Africa to alter or tamper with a vehicle's VIN or the factory stamped number on an engine in any way. Evidence of tampering will lead to the vehicles being confiscated and possibly destroyed.

== Historical Plates ==
Before 1994, South Africa had only four provinces: Cape Province, Natal Province, Orange Free State and Transvaal. Each province had its own identifying lettering: Cape – C, Natal – N, Orange Free State – O and Transvaal – T.

=== Pre-1980 ===
White letters on a black background were used across the country, including the military. For example: CC 147

Each town had a unique registration prefix followed by a number that was allocated sequentially from 1 (the mayor's vehicle) onward to 999 999. For trade plates (used by car dealers on un-licensed vehicles), the letters and numbers were swapped.

There were no personalised number plates.

Government

Government vehicles used the letters GG (for Government Garage) as a prefix, followed by a sequential number. For example: GG 4321

- Three government services and a government agency used their own registration codes:
- DW – Department of Water Affairs.
- P – Post Office (including telecommunications).
- SAS-R – South African Railways road motor service.
- BT – Bantu Trust.

Military

Military vehicles used the letter U (for Union Defence Force) as a prefix until 1961, when U was replaced by R (for Republic of South Africa), followed by a sequential number. Examples: U 4321 R 54321 On armoured vehicles especially, the numbers were painted in white on the green paint of the bodywork, or in black on desert sand paint.

Police

Police vehicles used the letters SAP as a prefix, followed by a sequential number. For example: SAP 4321

However, many police vehicles were registered locally and carried the registrations used in the four provinces.

Diplomatic corps

Diplomatic vehicles used the letters DC as a prefix, followed by a sequential number. For example: DC 4321

=== Cape Province ===
The towns in the Cape Province were originally assigned two-letter prefixes for the principal cities and towns, with smaller centres allocated three-letter codes. CA represented the largest city, Cape Town, CB the second-largest, Port Elizabeth, CC was Kimberley, CD King William's Town, CE East London, CF Grahamstown, CG Oudtshoorn, CH Queenstown, CI Worcester, CJ Paarl, CK Malmesbury and CL Stellenbosch. By the middle of the 20th century, it was realised that the letter I was easily confused with the figure 1 and Q with O and 0, while odd codes had been introduced with the small letter o tagged on. So the system was revised, eliminating the o codes, and extra two-letter codes were allocated: CM De Aar, CN Wellington, CO Calitzdorp, CR Hopefield, CS Bredasdorp, CT Ceres, CU Port Nolloth, CV Vredendal, CW Worcester, CX Knysna, CY Bellville and CZ Beaufort West. The full list of Cape Province prefixes (with present-day provinces in brackets) was:

Cape Province
Registration	Location
CA	Cape Town, including the magisterial districts of Wynberg and Simon's Town (Western Cape) Afrikaans: Kaapstad.
CAB	Aberdeen (Eastern Cape)
CAC	Burgersdorp (Eastern Cape) Dutch: Burghersdorp. Magisterial district of Albert.
CAD	Alexandria & Paterson (Eastern Cape)
CAE	Aliwal North (Eastern Cape) Afrikaans: Aliwal-Noord.
CAF	Barkly East (Eastern Cape) Afrikaans: Barkly-Oos.
CAG	Barkly West (Northern Cape) Afrikaans: Barkly-Wes.
CAH	Port Alfred & Bathurst (Eastern Cape) District of Lower Albany.
CAJ	Bedford (Eastern Cape)
CAL	Britstown (Northern Cape)
CAM	Caledon & Kleinmond (Western Cape)
CAN	Calvinia, Brandvlei & Loeriesfontein (Northern Cape)
CAO	Carnarvon (Northern Cape)
CAP	Cathcart (Eastern Cape)
CAR	Clanwilliam & Lambert's Bay (Western Cape)
CAS	Colesberg (Northern Cape)
CAT	Cradock (Eastern Cape)
CAU	Fort Beaufort (Eastern Cape) District of Victoria East.
CAV	Fraserburg (Northern Cape)
CAW	George (Western Cape)
CAX	Lady Frere & Glen Grey district (Eastern Cape) Became part of Transkei and used the code XR (Cacadu district).
CAY	Upington (Northern Cape) Was part of British Bechuanaland.
CAZ	Graaff-Reinet & Nieu-Bethesda (Eastern Cape)
CB	Port Elizabeth (Eastern Cape) Now part of Nelson Mandela Bay.
CBA	Hanover (Northern Cape)
CBB	Griquatown (Northern Cape) Afrikaans: Griekwastad. Was part of Griqualand West.
CBC	Douglas (Northern Cape) Was part of Griqualand West.
CBD	Herschel (Eastern Cape) Became part of Transkei and used the code XT.
CBE	Hopetown & Strydenburg (Northern Cape)
CBF	Humansdorp & Jeffreys Bay (Eastern Cape)
CBG	Jansenville (Eastern Cape)
CBH	Kenhardt (Northern Cape)
CBJ	Komga (Eastern Cape) Dutch: Komgha; now called Qumra.
CBK	Kuruman (Northern Cape) Now Kudumane.
CBL	Ladismith (Western Cape)
CBM	Laingsburg (Western Cape)
CBN	Mafeking (North West Province) When it was part of Bophuthatswana, the town's name was spelt Mafikeng; today it is Mahikeng. It used the Molopo district code YBA.
CBO	Hofmeyr (Eastern Cape) Magisterial district of Maraisburg (the town's original name).
CBP	Middelburg (Eastern Cape)
CBR	Montagu (Western Cape)
CBS	Mossel Bay & Hartenbos (Western Cape) Afrikaans Mosselbaai.
CBT	Murraysburg (Western Cape)
CBU	Springbok (Northern Cape) Namaqualand district.
CBV	Pearston (Eastern Cape)
CBW	Peddie (Eastern Cape) Was part of British Kaffraria; became part of Ciskei and used the code GCF.
CBX	Philipstown, with Petrusville & Vanderkloof (Northern Cape)
CBY	Piketberg (Western Cape)
CBZ	Prieska (Northern Cape)
CC	Kimberley (Northern Cape) Was capital of Griqualand West.
CCA	Prince Albert (Western Cape) Afrikaans: Prins Albert.
CCB	Richmond (Northern Cape)
CCC	Riversdale & Stilbaai (Western Cape) Afrikaans: Riversdal.
CCD	Robertson & McGregor (Western Cape)
CCE	Somerset East (Eastern Cape) Afrikaans: Somerset-Oos.
CCF	Steynsburg (Eastern Cape)
CCG	Steytlerville (Eastern Cape)
CCH	Seymour (Eastern Cape) Became part of Ciskei and used the code GCH (Mpofu district).
CCJ	Sutherland (Northern Cape)
CCK	Swellendam & Barrydale (Western Cape)
CCL	Tarkastad (Eastern Cape)
CCM	Tulbagh (Western Cape)
CCN	Uitenhage & Despatch (Eastern Cape) Now part of Nelson Mandela Bay.
CCO	Uniondale (Western Cape)
CCP	Van Rhynsdorp & Klawer (Western Cape) Afrikaans: Vanrhynsdorp.
CCR	Victoria West, Loxton & Vosburg (Northern Cape) Afrikaans: Victoria-Wes.
CCS	Vryburg & Reivilo (North West Province). This district was, in the 1880s, the short-lived Republic of Stellaland. It then became the capital of the colony of British Bechuanaland, and was annexed to the Cape Colony in 1895.
CCT	Willowmore (Eastern Cape)
CCU	Dordrecht (Eastern Cape)
CCV	Butterworth (Eastern Cape) Became part of Transkei and used the code XB (Gcuwa district).
CCY	Umtata (Eastern Cape) Now Mthatha. Became capital of Transkei with the code XA.
CCZ	Cala (Eastern Cape) Became part of Transkei and used the code XAC (Xalanga district).
CCW	Kokstad (now KwaZulu-Natal) When Kokstad, capital of Griqualand East, became part of the Natal Province in 1976, the prefix letter was changed to N: NCW)
CCX	Matatiele (in dispute between Eastern Cape and KwaZulu-Natal) When Matatiele, part of Griqualand East, became part of the Natal Province in 1976, the prefix letter was changed to N: NCX)
CD	King William's Town (Eastern Cape) "King", as it is known, was the capital of the colony of British Kaffraria. It did not become part of Ciskei, but its satellite township Zwelitsha did, using the code GCJ, which also served Dimbaza and Bisho. Now part of Buffalo City.
CDA	Elliot (Eastern Cape)
CDB	Engcobo (Eastern Cape) Now Ngcobo. Became part of Transkei and used the code XE.
CDC	Idutywa (Eastern Cape) Now Dutywa. Became part of Transkei and used the code XN.
CDD	Kentani (Eastern Cape) Became part of Transkei as Centane and used the code XY.
CDE	Nqamakwe (Eastern Cape) Became part of Transkei and used the code XAA.
CDF	Port St Johns (Eastern Cape) Became part of Transkei and used the code XF (Mzimvubu).
CDG	Elliotdale (Eastern Cape) Became part of Transkei and used the code XAD (Xhora).
CDH	Mqanduli (Eastern Cape) Became part of Transkei and used the code XAE.
CDJ	Bizana (Eastern Cape) Now Mbizana. Became part of Transkei and used the code XAF.
CDK	Willowvale (Eastern Cape) Became part of Transkei as Gatyana, code XAG.
CDM	Cofimvaba (Eastern Cape) Became part of Transkei, code XD.
CDN	Flagstaff (Eastern Cape) Became part of Transkei as Siphaqeni, code XAH.
CDL	Maclear (Eastern Cape)
CDO	Lusikisiki (Eastern Cape) Became part of Transkei and used the code XC.
CDP	Umzimkulu (KwaZulu-Natal) Now Umzimkhulu. Became part of Transkei and used the code XH. Transferred to KwaZulu-Natal in 2006 and uses the code NMZ.
CDR	Tabankulu (Eastern Cape) Became part of Transkei and used the code XAB.
CDS	Mount Frere (Eastern Cape) Became part of Transkei and used the code XK (KwaBhaca district).
CDT	Mount Fletcher (Eastern Cape) Became part of Transkei and used the code XW.
CDU	Libode (Eastern Cape) Became part of Transkei and used the code XU.
CDV	Qumbu (Eastern Cape) Became part of Transkei and used the code XV.
CDW	Mount Ayliff (Eastern Cape) Became part of Transkei as Maxesibeni, code XJ.
CDY	Ngqeleni (Eastern Cape) Became part of Transkei and used the code XZ.
CDX	Middledrift (Eastern Cape) Became part of Ciskei and used the code GCD.
CDZ	Venterstad (Eastern Cape)
CE	East London & Gonubie (Eastern Cape) Afrikaans: Oos-Londen. East London was never part of British Kaffraria, being annexed directly to the Cape Colony. Mdantsane, a satellite township to East London, became part of Ciskei and used the code GCE. Now part of Buffalo City.
CEA	Moorreesburg (Western Cape)
CEB	Kirkwood (Eastern Cape)
CEC	Garies (Northern Cape)
CED	Hankey (Eastern Cape)
CEE	Warrenton (Northern Cape) Was part of Griqualand West.
CEF	Whittlesea (Eastern Cape) Became part of Ciskei and used the code GCB (Hewu district).
CEG	Heidelberg (Western Cape)
CEH	Jamestown (Eastern Cape)
CEJ	Lady Grey (Eastern Cape) Became part of Transkei as Cacadu district, code ZR.
CEK	Pofadder (Northern Cape)
CEL	Noupoort (Northern Cape) Dutch: Naauwpoort.
CEM	Hermanus, Gansbaai, Onrus River & Stanford (Western Cape)
CEN	Indwe (Eastern Cape)
CEO	Grabouw & Elgin (Western Cape)
CEP	Sterkstroom (Eastern Cape)
CER	Bonnievale (Western Cape)
CES	Albertinia (Western Cape)
CET	Joubertina (Eastern Cape)
CEU	Hartswater & Jan Kempdorp (Northern Cape) Jan Kempdorp was (before 1994) the only town in the country that fell into two provinces: the Cape and the Transvaal. It was treated administratively as being part of the Cape.
CEV	Postmasburg & Daniëlskuil (Northern Cape) Was part of British Bechuanaland.
CEW	Olifantshoek, Sishen & Kathu (Northern Cape) Was part of British Bechuanaland.
CEX	Porterville (Western Cape)
CEY	Strand & Gordon's Bay (Western Cape) Now part of Cape Town.
CEZ	Williston (Northern Cape)
CF	Grahamstown (Eastern Cape) This code is now used for Kuils River. Grahamstown, seat of the Albany district, is now named Makhanda.
CFA	Wolseley (Western Cape)
CFB	Molteno (Eastern Cape)
CFC	Stutterheim (Eastern Cape) Previously part of British Kaffraria. Earlier code CCI.
CFD	Alice (Eastern Cape), Victoria East district. Became part of Ciskei and used the code GCA.
CFE	Tsolo (Eastern Cape) Became part of Transkei and used the code XO.
CFF	Tsomo (Eastern Cape) Became part of Transkei and used the code XAC.
CFG	Vredenburg, Saldanha & St Helena Bay (Western Cape) Previously CEI.
CFH	Kakamas (Northern Cape)
CFJ	Adelaide (Eastern Cape)
CFK	Keiskammahoek (Eastern Cape) Previously CDo. Became part of Ciskei and used the code GCC.
CFM	Somerset West (Western Cape) Afrikaans: Somerset-Wes. Previously CFm. Now part of Cape Town.
CFN	Taung (North West) Historically written as Taungs. Previously CCSo. Was part of British Bechuanaland; became part of Bophuthatswana and used the code YBN.
CFO	Keimoes (Northern Cape) Was part of British Bechuanaland.
CFP	Velddrif (incorporating Laaiplek; this code previously used for Laaiplek) (Western Cape)
CFR	Kuils River, Durbanville, Brackenfell & Kraaifontein (Western Cape) Afrikaans: Kuilsrivier. In the 21st century, the code for Kuils River became CF (previously the code for Grahamstown). Now part of Cape Town.
CFS	Groblershoop (Northern Cape)
CG	Oudtshoorn (Western Cape)
CH	Queenstown (Eastern Cape) Now called Komani.
CJ	Paarl & Franschhoek (Western Cape)
CK	Malmesbury & Darling (Western Cape)
CL	Stellenbosch (Western Cape)
CM	De Aar (Northern Cape) Previously CALo.
CN	Wellington (Western Cape) Previously CJo.
CO	Calitzdorp (Western Cape)
CR	Hopefield, Langebaan & Langebaan Road (Western Cape)
CS	Bredasdorp & Napier (Western Cape) Previously CAK.
CT	Ceres (Western Cape) Previously CAQ.
CU	Port Nolloth (Northern Cape)
CV	Vredendal (Western Cape) Previously part of Van Rhynsdorp district.
CW	Worcester, De Doorns & Touws River (Western Cape) Previously CI.
CWB	Walvis Bay (now Namibia) Walvis Bay, although legally part of the Cape Province, was long administered as part of South West Africa and used the SWA registration Wb. In the 1970s South West Africa adopted a new system using codes starting with S; Walvis Bay was SV. CWB was used during the short period when the town and its surrounding territory was returned to the Cape in the 1980s. Afrikaans: Walvisbaai. The German name Walfischbucht was never official, as the town was never part of German South West Africa.
CX	Knysna, Sedgefield & Plettenberg Bay (Western Cape) Previously CBI.
CY	Bellville, Goodwood, Parow, Durbanville & Kraaifontein (Western Cape) Now part of Cape Town.
CZ	Beaufort West (Western Cape) Afrikaans: Beaufort-Wes. Previously CAI.
PA	Provincial Administration Used on provincial traffic control and road construction vehicles, among others.

Codes obsolete by 1950

Cape Province
Registration	Location
CAGo	Klipdam (Northern Cape), near Windsorton; now a ghost town. Was part of Griqualand West.
CAK	Bredasdorp & Napier (Western Cape) Now CS.
CALo	De Aar (Northern Cape) Later CM.
CAQ	Ceres (Western Cape) Now CT.
CAUo	Adelaide (Eastern Cape) Later CFJ.
CAVo	Williston (Northern Cape) Later CEZ.
CAI	Beaufort West (Western Cape) Afrikaans: Beaufort-Wes. Now CZ.
CBI	Knysna, Sedgefield & Plettenberg Bay (Western Cape) Now CX.
CBQ	Molteno (Eastern Cape) Later CFB.
CDI	Tsolo (Eastern Cape) Later CFE.
CCI	Stutterheim (Eastern Cape) Later CFC.
CCQ	Alice (Eastern Cape) Victoria East district. Later CFD.
CCSo	Taung (North West) Historically written as Taungs. Later CFN.
CDo	Keiskammahoek (Eastern Cape) Later CFK.
CDQ	Tsomo (Eastern Cape) Later CFF.
CEI	Vredenburg, Saldanha Bay & St Helena Bay (Western Cape) Now CFG.
CFm	Somerset West (Western Cape) Afrikaans: Somerset-Wes. Now CFM.
CGo	Calitzdorp (Western Cape) Now CO.
CHo	Sterkstroom (Eastern Cape) Later CEP.
CI	Worcester (Western Cape) Now CW.
CJo	Wellington (Western Cape) Now CN.
CKo	Hopefield (Western Cape) Now CR.

=== Transvaal Province ===
A 1978 number plate from Transvaal Province.

Transvaal
Registration	Location
TA	Benoni (Gauteng) Now part of Ekurhuleni.
TAA	Barberton (Mpumalanga)
TAB	Bethal (Mpumalanga)
TAC	Christiana (North West)
TAD	Lichtenburg (North West)
TAE	Lydenburg (Mpumalanga)
TAF	Zeerust (North West)
TAG	Piet Retief (Mpumalanga)
TAH	Nylstroom (Limpopo) Now Modimolle.
TAI	Wolmaransstad (North West) Obsolete code.
TAJ	Louis Trichardt (Limpopo)
TAK	Wolmaransstad district (North West)
TAL	Pietersburg (Limpopo) Now Polokwane.
TAM	Wakkerstroom (Mpumalanga)
TAN	Potgietersrus (Limpopo) Now Mokopane.
TAO	Ottosdal (North West)
TAP	Graskop (Mpumalanga)
TAQ	Balfour (Mpumalanga)
TAR	Messina (Limpopo) Now Musina.
TAS	Delmas (Mpumalanga)
TAT	Greylingstad (Mpumalanga)
TAU	Fochville (Gauteng)
TAV	Hercules (Gauteng) Incorporated into Pretoria in 1948.
TAW	Bronkhorstspruit (Gauteng)
TAX	Swartruggens (North West)
TAY	Randfontein (Gauteng)
TAZ	Brits (North West)
TB	Boksburg (Gauteng) Now part of Ekurhuleni.
TBA	Dullstroom (Mpumalanga)
TBB	Leeudoringstad (North West)
TBC	Tzaneen (Limpopo)
TBD	Duiwelskloof (Limpopo) Now Modjadjiskloof.
TBE	Delareyville (North West)
TBF	Hendrina (Mpumalanga)
TBG	Charl Cilliers (Mpumalanga)
TBH	Nelspruit (Mpumalanga) Now Mbombela.
TBI	Koster (North West)
TBJ	Trichardt (Mpumalanga)
TBK	Morgenzon (Mpumalanga)
TBL	Machadodorp (Mpumalanga) Now eNtokozweni.
TBM	Breyten (Mpumalanga)
TBS	Sabie (Mpumalanga)
TBZ	Thabazimbi (Limpopo)
TC	Carolina (Mpumalanga)
TCA	Groblersdal (Limpopo)
TCB	Belfast (Mpumalanga)
TCC	Coligny (North West)
TCD	Kempton Park (Gauteng) Afrikaans: Kemptonpark.
TCE	Westonaria (Gauteng)
TCO	Carletonville (North West)
TCX	Makwassie (North West)
TD	Standerton (Mpumalanga)
TDD	Pilgrim's Rest (Mpumalanga)
TDG	Nigel (Gauteng)
TDH	White River (Mpumalanga) Afrikaans: Witrivier.
TDJ	Leslie (Mpumalanga)
TDK	Alberton (Gauteng) Now part of Ekurhuleni.
TDL	Edenvale (Gauteng) Now part of Johannesburg.
TE	Ermelo (Mpumalanga)
TEA	Amsterdam (Mpumalanga)
TF	Amersfoort (Mpumalanga)
TG	Germiston (Gauteng) Now part of Ekurhuleni.
TH	Heidelberg (Gauteng)
TJ	Johannesburg (Gauteng)
TK	Krugersdorp (Gauteng) Now part of Mogale City.
TL	Bloemhof (North West)
TLN	Lyttelton (Gauteng) In 1967 the town of Lyttelton was named Verwoerdburg (the township of Lyttelton retained its name). The code TLN was retained until the introduction of the province-wide T registration system. Following the 1994 elections the name Verwoerdburg was dropped and the town was named Centurion, after the cricket stadium near the N1, Centurion Park. The stadium now bears a sponsor's name.
TM	Middelburg (Mpumalanga)
TN	Ventersdorp (North West)
TNS	Naboomspruit (Limpopo) Now Mookgophong.
TO	Brakpan (Gauteng) Now part of Ekurhuleni.
TON	Meyerton (Gauteng) Now part of Midvaal.
TOY	Orkney (North West)
TP	Pretoria (Gauteng) Now part of Tshwane.
TQ	Standerton (Mpumalanga)
TR	Schweizer-Reneke (North West)
TRB	Rustenburg (North West)
TRG	Randburg (Gauteng) Now part of Johannesburg.
TS	Springs (Gauteng) Now part of Ekurhuleni.
TSN	Sandton (Gauteng) Now part of Johannesburg.
TT	Volksrust (Mpumalanga)
TU	Roodepoort (Gauteng) Long known as Roodepoort-Maraisburg; now part of Johannesburg.
TV	Vereeniging (Gauteng)
TVB	Vanderbijl Park (Gauteng) Afrikaans: Vanderbijlpark.
TW	Witbank (Mpumalanga)
TWB	Warmbaths (Limpopo) Afrikaans: Warmbad. Now Bela Bela.
TX	Potchefstroom (North West)
TY	Klerksdorp (North West)
TZ	Stilfontein (North West)
Province
TPA	Transvaal Provincial Administration Used on provincial vehicles.

Circa 1975 to 1994;

A new numbering scheme had to be introduced in the Transvaal, after the Johannesburg series exceeded the number TJ 999-999 . An alphanumeric system was introduced in this province, which allowed more permutations with fewer characters. The reason given for this change was that it was necessary because the system was computerised, which was an argument only valid for a few years. Despite this, a trend towards centralisation of vehicle registries continued, despite its inconvenience to motorists. The series comprised three letters followed by three numbers and the letter T. All number plates used black text on a yellow background, for example: BCD 123 T .

From this point onward, a Transvaal vehicle's origin could no longer be narrowed down to a specific town or city. However the first letter of the registration indicated the date of first registration of a vehicle, as the sequence grew alphabetically. However, because the Transvaal used codes that coincided with those used in other provinces, traffic officers failed to notice the T at the end, and issued fines to Cape motorists whose registrations matched those of T vehicles passing through the Cape. The use of C and N codes ought to have been barred. O was not used, since the new system avoided the use of vowels.

At this time black text on yellow background became mandatory throughout South Africa so the other three provinces also adopted the new black on yellow number plates, but kept their existing numbering systems. Example: CR 7822. At this stage government plates adopted the same system as Transvaal. Example: BCD 123 M.

Towards 1994 this numbering system for the Transvaal was rapidly running out of permutations. However, in 1994 the four provinces were dissolved and nine new provinces were created. All the new provinces apart from the Western Cape and KwaZulu-Natal adopted the alphanumeric system. Due to public demand at this time, different text colour on white background was also allowed. The different provinces could decide on text colour for their plates. A white background is used in all provinces although some provinces place graphics on this background relevant to their province.

Towards 2012 Gauteng Province (GP) was running out of permutations and had to adopt a new system. This system used two letters, two numbers, two letters and the province indicator GP.

=== Natal Province ===
In many cases the districts of the province took their letters from the place names to determine the letters that are used to identify each region. Almost all of the areas remained unchanged since 1994, the Only province in South Africa not changing number plates or areas since 1994. This pattern does not always hold.

Natal
Registration	Location
NA	Harding (Alfred County)
NAT	Amanzimtoti
NB	Bergville
NBA	Babanango
NC	Camperdown
NCO	Colenso
NCW	Kokstad (Since 1976)
NCX	Matatiele (Since 1976)
ND	Durban
NDE	Dundee
NDH	Dannhauser
NDW	Ndwedwe
NE	Estcourt
NES	Eshowe Zululand.
NF	Msinga (Tugela Ferry)
NGL	Glencoe
NH	New Hanover
NHL	Hlabisa Zululand.
NIM	Impendle
NIN	Ingwavuma Zululand.
NIP	Bulwer Now Polela.
NIX	Ixopo
NJ	Verulam, Inanda & Tongaat
NK	Richmond
NKA	Nkandla Zululand.
NKK	Kranskop
NKR	Ladysmith & Klip River
NKU	Ulundi Zululand.
NM	Maputo Zululand.
NMA	Mahlabatini Zululand.
NMG	Magudu
NMR	Mooi River & Nottingham Road
NN	Newcastle
NND	Nongoma Zululand.
NO	Melmoth (Mtonjaneni district, Zululand)
NP	Pietermaritzburg Capital of Natal.
NPN	Pinetown & Cowies Hill.
NPP	Paulpietersburg Was part of Nieuwe Republiek; annexed to Natal in 1903
NPS	Port Shepstone (Lower Umzimkulu)
NR	Howick & Lions River
NRB	Richards Bay Afrikaans: Richardsbaai. Zululand.
NS	Louwsburg Now Ngotshe.
NT	Stanger (now KwaDukuza) & Ballito (Lower Tugela)
NTU	Nqutu In Zululand. Now Nquthu.
NU	Queensburgh, New Germany, Waterfall, Hillcrest & Kloof ("Upper Highway")
NUB	Ubombo Zululand.
NUD	Underberg (Himeville district)
NUF	Empangeni (Lower Umfolozi, Zululand)
NUL	Umbumbulu
NUM	Greytown & Umvoti
NUR	Umhlanga Rocks
NUT	Utrecht Previously part of the Zuid Afrikaansche Republiek; annexed to Natal in 1903.
NUZ	Umlazi
NV	Vryheid This town was the capital of the Nieuwe Republiek, then became part of the Zuid Afrikaansche Republiek. It was annexed to Natal in 1903.
NW	Weenen
NX	Scottburgh & Umzinto (Formerly Alexandra County.)
NZ	Mtunzini
Provincial & local government
NPA	Natal Provincial Administration
NPB	Natal Parks Board
NDC	Durban Corporation
NPC	Pietermaritzburg Corporation
NBB	Natal Bantu Affairs administration boards (BAABs)

=== Orange Free State ===
The town of Sasolburg, where oil is produced out of coal, received the very appropriate prefix OIL.

Orange Free State
Registration	Location
OA	Bethlehem
OAB	Reitz
OAF	Kestell
OB	Bloemfontein Now part of Mangaung.
OBB	Brandfort
OBD	Dewetsdorp
OBG	Reddersburg
OBT	Botshabelo Satellite township of Bloemfontein, adjacent to Thaba Nchu. Now part of Mangaung.
OBW	Witsieshoek Phuthaditjhaba, which was the capital of Qwaqwa.
OC	Bethulie
OCC	Springfontein
OD	Boshof
ODB	Hertzogville
ODD	Dealesville
OE	Edenburg
OEB	Trompsburg
OF	Fauresmith
OFB	Jagersfontein
OFD	Koffiefontein
OFH	Petrusburg
OG	Ficksburg
OGB	Fouriesburg
OH	Frankfort
OHB	Villiers
OHS	Harrismith
OIC	Warden
OIL	Sasolburg
OJ	Heilbron
OK	Hoopstad
OKB	Bultfontein
OKC	Odendaalsrus
OKD	Wesselsbron
OKE	Welkom
OL	Jacobsdal
OM	Kroonstad
OMB	Bothaville
OMF	Viljoenskroon
OMG	Edenville
ON	Ladybrand
ONB	Hobhouse
OND	Clocolan Now Hlohloane.
OO	Lindley
OOD	Steynsrus
OOE	Petrus Steyn
OP	Philippolis
OQB	Zastron Obsolete code. Later OZ.
OR	Senekal
ORD	Marquard
ORE	Paul Roux
ORX	Rouxville
OS	Smithfield
OU	Vrede
OUB	Memel
OV	Parys
OVB	Vredefort
OVE	Koppies
OW	Wepener
OX	Winburg
OXD	Theunissen
OXF	Ventersburg
OXG	Excelsior & Tweespruit
OXH	Hennenman
OXV	Virginia
OZ	Zastron Previously OQB.
Province
PAO	Provincial Administration Used on provincial vehicles.

=== Homeland Number Plates ===
Under apartheid South Africa, each of the homelands had its own department of vehicle licensing.

==== Bophuthatswana ====
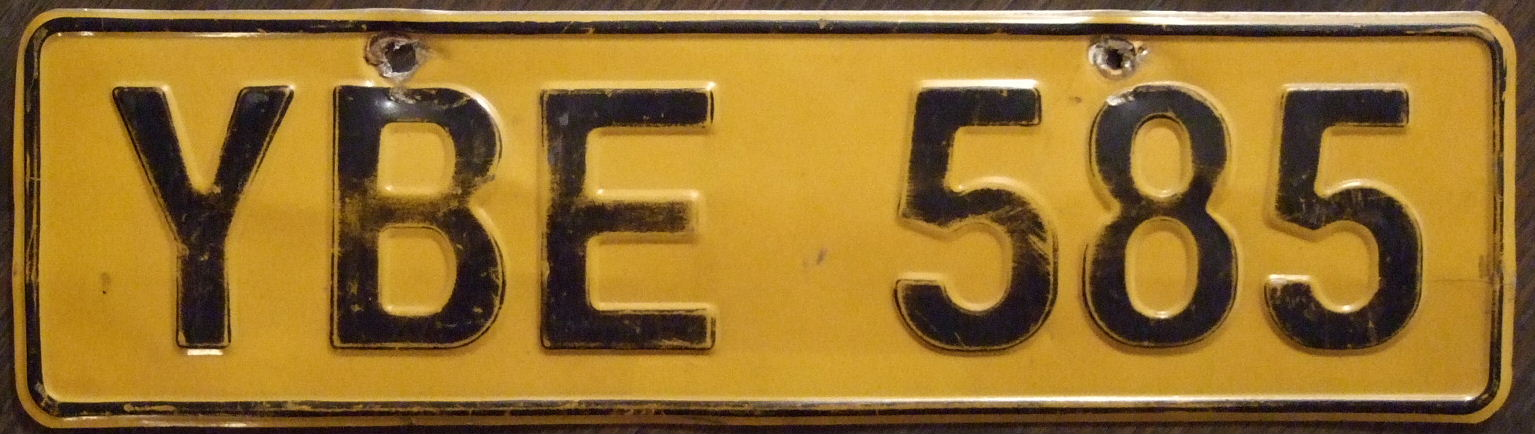
A 1977 number plate from Ditsobotla, Bophuthatswana homeland.

- YBA – Molopo, including Mafikeng (now Mahikeng) and the Bophuthatswana capital, Mmabatho.
- YBB – Odi. Previously part of Brits district, code TAZ.
- YBC – Moretele. Previously part of Pretoria district, code TP.
- YBD – Bafokeng & Tlhabane. Previously part of Rustenburg district, code TRB.
- YBE – Ditsobotla. Previously part of Lichtenburg district, code TAB.
- YBF – Mogwase. Previously part of Rustenburg district, code TRB.
- YBG – Lehurutshe. Previously part of Zeerust district, TAF.
- YBH – Tlhaping-Tlharo. Previously Kuruman district (now Kudumane), CBK.
- YBJ – Madikwe. Previously part of Zeerust district, TAF.
- YBK – Thaba Nchu. Previously part of Bloemfontein district, OB.
- YBL – Mankwe. Previously part of Rustenburg district, code TRB.
- YBM – Ganyesa. Previously part of Stellaland (Vryburg), code CCS.
- YBN – Taung. Previously CFN.
- YBX – Mabopane. Previously part of Pretoria district, code TP.

Government

- YB – Government vehicles
- YBP – Police vehicles

Most of Bophuthatswana was absorbed into North West Province. Thaba Nchu returned to the Free State Province. The half-district Moretele 2 (east of the N1) became part of Mpumalanga.

==== Ciskei ====
- GCA – Alice Previously CFD.
- GCB – Hewu & Whittlesea. Previously CEF.
- GCC – Keiskammahoek Previously CFK.
- GCD – Middledrift Previously CDX.
- GCE – Mdantsane Previously part of the East London district, code CE.
- GCF – Peddie Previously CBW.
- GCH – Mpofu & Seymour. Previously CCH.
- GCJ – Zwelitsha, Bisho (now Bhisho) & Dimbaza. Bisho was the capital of Ciskei; today it is the capital of the Eastern Cape. Previously part of the King William's Town district, code CD.

Government

- GC – Ciskei government vehicles
- GCP – Ciskei police vehicles

Ciskei became part of the Eastern Cape Province.

==== Gazankulu ====
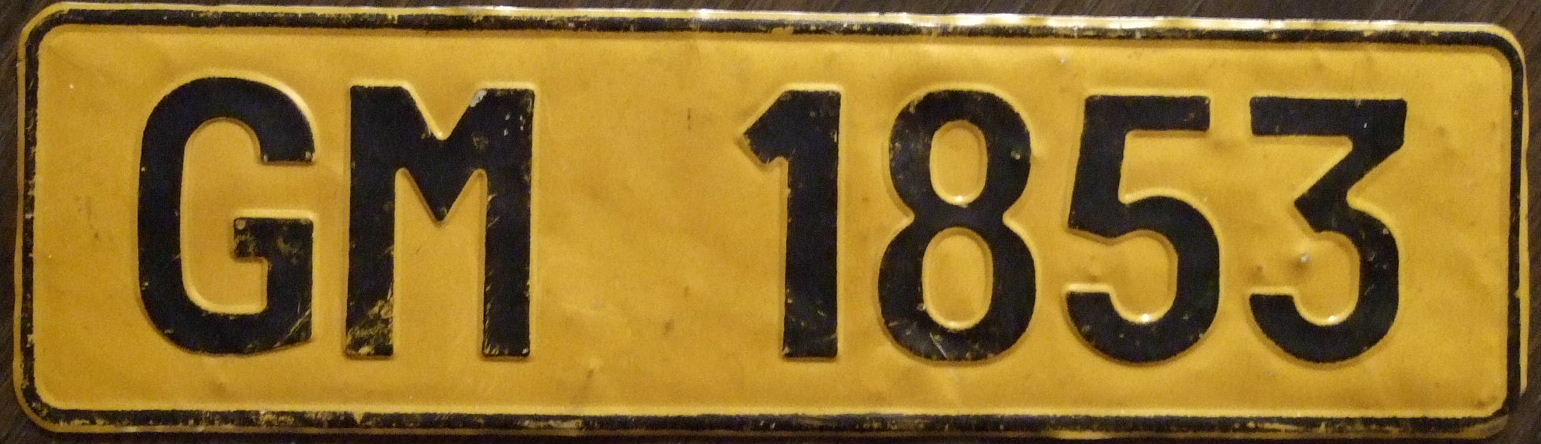
A 1972 number plate from Malamulele, Gazankulu homeland.

- GM – Malamulele district. Previously part of Louis Trichardt district (TAJ). Now part of Limpopo province.
- GY – Giyani district. Previously part of Louis Trichardt district (TAJ). Now part of Limpopo province.
- GR – Ritavi district. Previously part of Tzaneen district (TBC). Now part of Limpopo.
- GH – Mhala district. Previously part of White River district (TDH). Now part of Mpumalanga.
- GN - Hlanganani District. Which includes Elim, Bungeni, Majozi, Tiyani, Msengi, Olifantshoek and Rotterdam

Government

- GAZ – Gazankulu government

==== Lebowa ====
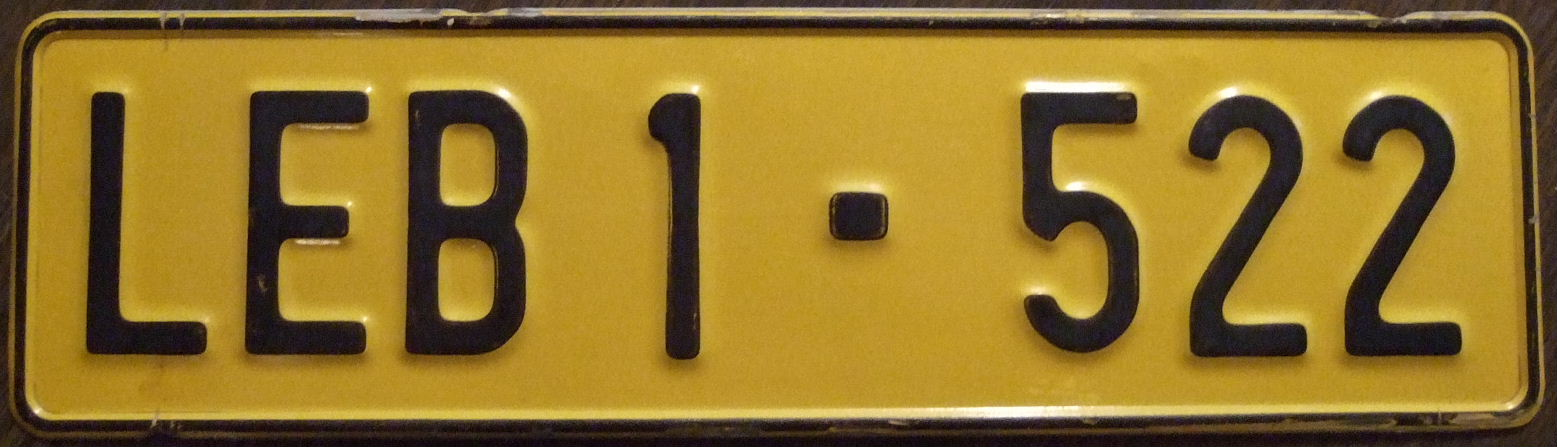
A 1974 number plate from Thabamoopo, Lebowa homeland.

- LEB-1-NUMBER/S – Lebowakgomo (capital of Lebowa) & Mankweng (Thabamoopo district) Previously Pietersburg district (TAL).
- LEB-2-NUMBER/S – Schoonoord & surrounds. Previously Groblersdal district (TCA).
- LEB-3-NUMBER/S – Mahwelereng & surrounds (Mokerong District) Previously Potgietersrus district (TAN).
- LEB-4-NUMBER/S – Seshego, Moletji, Matlala & Mashashane. Previously Pietersburg district (TAL).
- LEB-5-NUMBER/S – Mapulaneng (Bushbuckridge). Previously Graskop district (TAP).
- LEB-6-NUMBER/S – Nebo & surrounds. Previously Groblersdal district (TCA).
- LEB-7-NUMBER/S – Tzaneen & Bolobedu surrounds. Previously TBC)
- LEB-8-NUMBER/S – Tzaneen & Lenyenye (Naphuno). Previously TBC.
- LEB-9-NUMBER/S – Praktiseer & surrounds. Previously Lydenburg district (TAE).
- LEB-10-NUMBER/S – Botlokwa & Sekgosese. Previously Pietersburg district (TAL).
- LEB-11-NUMBER/SO – Bochum & surrounds. Previously Pietersburg district (TAL).
- LEB-13-NUMBER/S – Phalaborwa. Previously Graskop district (TAP).

Government

- LG – Lebowa government
- LP – Lebowa police

Lebowa became part of Limpopo Province.

==== Qwaqwa ====
- OBW – private vehicles
- WR – government vehicles
- WRP – police vehicles

The letter W stands for the Witsieshoek district, where Qwaqwa was located. Retained the code OBW from the Orange Free State. It is once more part of the Free State.

==== KwaNdebele ====
- KNK – KwaMhlanga
- KNE – Enkangala
- KNA – Siyabuswa
- KNB – Kwaggafontein
- KNF – Vaalbank (Libangeni)

Government

- KNG – KwaNdebele government
- KNP – KwaNdebele police

KwaNdebele became part of Mpumalanga province.

==== Transkei ====
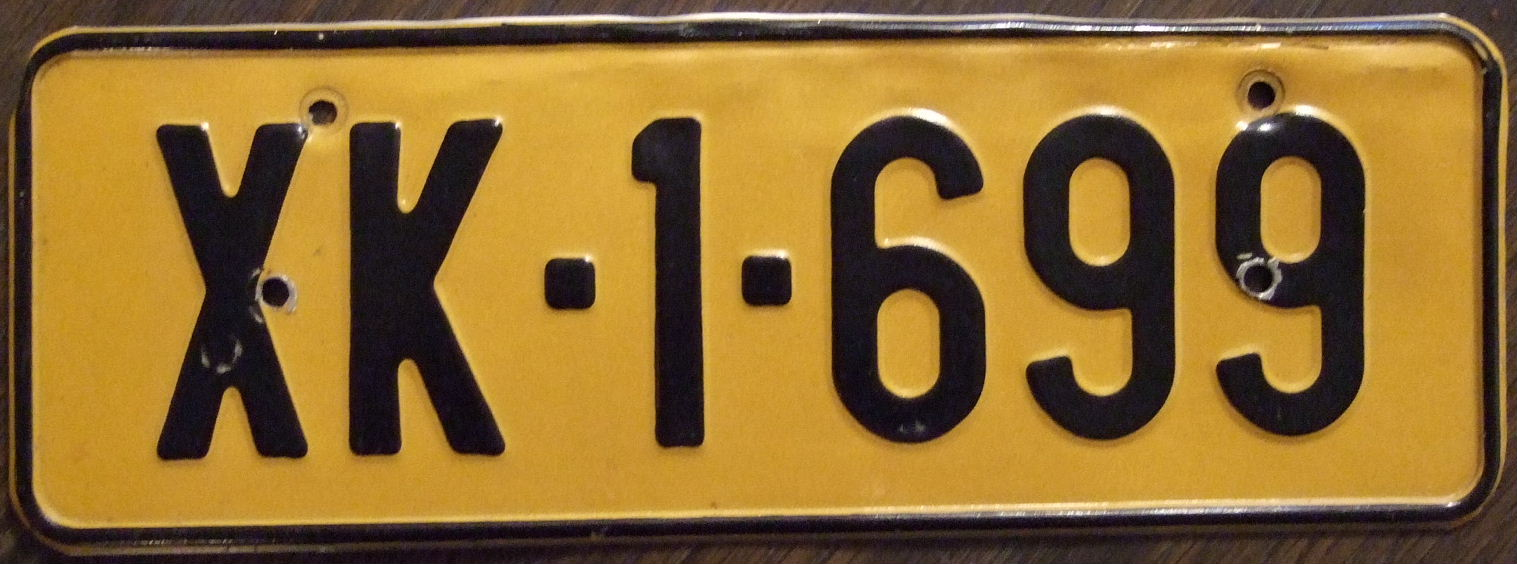
A 1979 number plate from KwaBhaca, Transkei homeland.

- XA – Umtata Transkei capital. Today Mthatha, Eastern Cape. Previously CCY.
- XAA – Nqamakwe Previously CDE.
- XAB – Tabankulu Previously CDR.
- XAC – Tsomo Previously CFF.
- XAD – Xhora & Elliotdale. Previously CDG. Now Xora.
- XAE – Mqanduli Previously CDH.
- XAF – Bizana Now Mbizana. Previously CDJ.
- XAG – Gatyana Formerly Willowvale, CDK.
- XAH – Siphaqeni Formerly Flagstaff, CDN.
- XB – Gcuwa (Butterworth district) Previously CCV.
- XC – Lusikisiki Previously CDO.
- XD – Cofimvaba Previously CDM.
- XE – Engcobo Now Ngcobo. Previously CDB.
- XF – Umzimvubu & Port St Johns. Previously CDF.
- XH – Umzimkulu Now Umzimkhulu. Previously CDP; since 2006 part of KwaZulu-Natal, code NMZ.
- XJ – Maxesibeni, previously Mount Ayliff, code CDW.
- XK – KwaBhaca & Mount Frere. Previously CDS.
- XL – Maloti New district at the foot of the Drakensberg range, home to many Sotho-speakers.
- XR – Cacadu (Lady Frere) Previously Glen Grey district, code CAX.
- XN – Idutywa Previously CDC. Now Dutywa.
- XO – Tsolo Previously CFE.
- XS – Xalanga, including Cala (previously CCZ).
- XT – Herschel Previously CBD.
- XU – Libode Previously CDU.
- XV – Qumbu Previously CDV.
- XW – Mount Fletcher. Previously CDT.
- XY – Centane. Previously Kentani, code CCD.
- XZ – Ngqeleni Previously CDY.

Government

- XG – Transkei government
- XGA – Agriculture & Forestry Department
- XGC – Commerce, Industry & Tourism Department
- XGH – Health & Welfare Department
- XGL – Local Government & Land Tenure Department
- XGW – Works & Energy Department
- XM – Transkei army
- XP – Transkei police
- XPT – Transkei traffic police
- XRT – Transkei Road Transport Service

Transkei became part of the Eastern Cape Province, apart from Umzimkhulu, which was transferred to KwaZulu-Natal in 2006.

==== Venda ====
- VD – Dzanani
- VS – Tshitale
- VT – Thohoyandou
- VV – Dzanani, Mutale, Sibasa & Vuwani

Government

- VM – Government vehicles
- VDF – Defence Force
- VP – Police
- VTA – Traffic administration

Venda became part of Limpopo Province.

==== Zululand / KwaZulu ====
- ZG – Government
- ZK – Paramount Chief
- ZP – Police
- Z – private vehicles
- ZAR - Zuid Afrikaanse Boervolk

The colony of Zululand lay to the north of the Tugela River (today Thukela) and was annexed to Natal in 1887. Its tribal territories fell under the Paramount Chief of the amaZulu.

KwaZulu was created to encompass the tribal territories of both Natal and Zululand, and also fell under the Paramount Chief (today the King) of the amaZulu.

In 1994 KwaZulu and Natal were merged as KwaZulu-Natal Province.

Ulundi was the capital of KwaZulu and shared the status of KwaZulu-Natal capital with Pietermaritzburg until 2004.
