= Hopefield, South Africa =

Hopefield
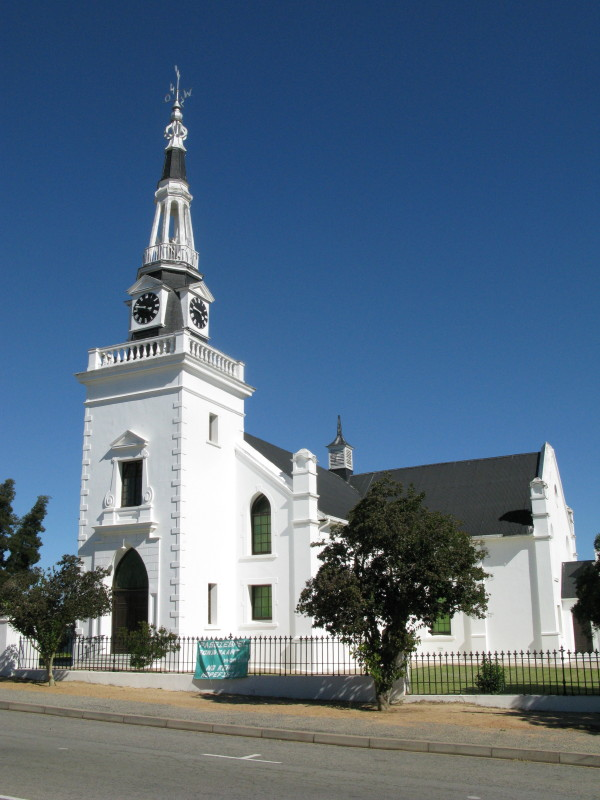
- Hopefield Dutch Reformed Church

- Location within Western Cape Location within South Africa
- Coordinates: 33°03′56″S 18°21′03″E
- Country: South Africa
- Province: Western Cape
- District: West Coast
- Municipality: Saldanha Bay

Area
  - Total: 32.41 km^{2} (12.51 sq mi)

Population (2011)
  - Total: 6,460
  - Density: 199/km^{2} (516/sq mi)

Racial makeup (2011)
  - Black African: 2.6%
  - Coloured: 81.5%
  - Indian/Asian: 0.5%
  - White: 14.4%
  - Other: 1.0%

First languages (2011)
  - Afrikaans: 94.2%
  - English: 3.5%
  - Other: 2.3%
- Time zone: UTC+2 (SAST)
- Postal code (street): 7355
- PO box: 7355
- Area code: 022

Hopefield is a settlement in West Coast District Municipality in the Western Cape province of South Africa on the R45 between Malmesbury and Vredenburg. The town lies east of Saldanha Bay and Langebaan, 40 km (25 mi) southeast of Vredenburg and 120 km (75 mi) north of Cape Town.

== History ==
Hopefield is the oldest town on the Cape West Coast.

The Dutch Reformed congregation (Zoute Rivier) was established in December 1851 after farmers donated money towards its construction and the town was founded in 1852 on the farm Langekuil. It became a municipality in 1914, and was named after two people who laid it out, Major William Hope, Auditor-General, and a Mr Field.

== General ==
The Air Force Base Langebaanweg, located 22 km (14 mi) west of the town, as well as the West Coast Fossil park 25 km (16 mi) west from town, fall within town limits. Another important fossil locality, Elandsfontein (not to be confused with the town and railway station in Gauteng), is found about 13 km (8.1 mi) southwest of Hopefield.

In earlier years Hopefield was considered the capital of the West Coast, with banks, filling stations and multiple other shops and businesses. The only access to the towns of Vredenburg, Langebaan and Saldanha was through Hopefield. With the re-routing of the R45 road away from the town, and the construction of the R27 (West Coast Road), the importance of the town gradually faded.

== Schools ==
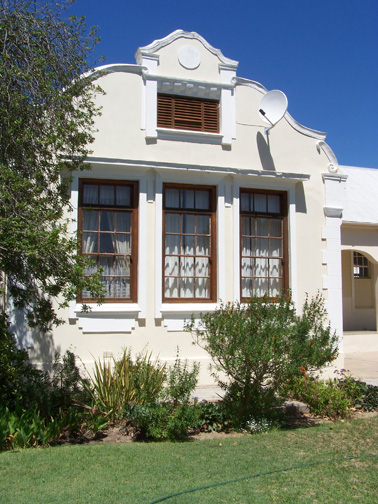
Hopefield High

There are two schools in the town, Hopefield Primary, offering Grade 1-9, and Hopefield High, offering Grade R-12.
