= Saldanha Bay Local Municipality =

Saldanha Bay Saldanhabaai
- Local municipality
- Seal

- Location in the Western Cape
- Coordinates: 33°00′S 18°15′E
- Country: South Africa
- Province: Western Cape
- District: West Coast
- Seat: Vredenburg
- Wards: 14

Government
  - Type: Municipal council
  - Mayor: Marius Koen (DA)
  - Municipal Manager: Heinrich Mettler

Area
  - Total: 2,015 km^{2} (778 sq mi)

Population (2022)
  - Total: 154,635
  - Density: 76.74/km^{2} (198.8/sq mi)

Racial makeup (2022)
  - Black African: 30.2%
  - Coloured: 51.4%
  - Indian/Asian: 0.5%
  - White: 16.5%

First languages (2011)
  - Afrikaans: 72.5%
  - Xhosa: 16.4%
  - English: 6.6%
  - Sotho: 1.2%
  - Other: 3.3%
- Time zone: UTC+2 (SAST)
- Municipal code: WC014
- Website: sbm.gov.za

Saldanha Bay Municipality (Afrikaans: Saldanhabaai Munisipaliteit; Xhosa: uMasipala wase Saldanha Bay) is a local municipality located within the West Coast District Municipality, in the Western Cape province of South Africa. As of 2022, it had a population of 154,635. Its municipality code is WC014.

== History ==
The towns of Vredenburg and Saldanha were united under a single Vredenburg-Saldanha Municipality in 1975. At the end of the apartheid era, in the area that is today the Saldanha Bay Municipality there were also municipal councils for Hopefield, Langebaan and St Helena Bay. These councils were elected by the white residents, while the coloured residents of the towns were governed by management committees subordinate to the white councils.

While the negotiations to end apartheid were taking place a process was established for local authorities to negotiate voluntary mergers. Hopefield took part in this process, merging the municipal council with the management committee in November 1992. Langebaan did the same in April 1993.

After the national elections of 1994 a process of local government transformation began, in which negotiations were held between the existing local authorities, political parties, and local community organisations. As a result of these negotiations, the existing local authorities were dissolved and transitional local councils (TLCs) were created in January 1995. The Hopefield and Langebaan municipalities were each replaced with a TLC. The West Coast Peninsula TLC replaced the Vredenburg-Saldanha Municipality, the St Helena Bay Municipality, and their respective management committees.

The transitional councils were initially made up of members nominated by the various parties to the negotiations, until May 1996 when elections were held. At these elections the West Coast District Council was established, replacing the West Coast Regional Services Council. Transitional representative councils (TRCs) were also elected to represent rural areas outside the TLCs on the District Council; the area that was to become Bergrivier Municipality included part of the Malmesbury TRC.

At the local elections of December 2000 the TLCs and TRCs were dissolved and the Saldanha Bay Municipality was established as a single local authority incorporating both rural and urban areas. In 2006 the boundary of the municipality was adjusted slightly to transfer a strip of land on the left bank of the Berg River (adjacent to Velddrif) to the Bergrivier Local Municipality. In 2011 the West Coast National Park, previously a District Management Areas, was added to the municipality when District Management Areas were abolished.

== Geography ==
Topographic map of the Saldanha Bay Municipality

The municipality covers a total area of 2,015 square kilometres (778 sq mi) which includes the West Coast Peninsula (also known as the Vredenburg Peninsula) and stretches southeast to include the West Coast National Park and the area around Hopefield. It abuts on the Bergrivier Municipality to the north and the Swartland Municipality to the east and south.

The seat of the municipality and its largest town is Vredenburg, which is situated in the center of the eponymous peninsula and according to the 2011 census has a population of 38,382. To the south of Vredenburg is the harbour town of Saldanha (pop. 28,142) on the edge of Saldanha Bay. There are several other fishing and holiday towns on the coast of the municipality: St Helena Bay (pop. 11,529) on the northern coast of the Vredenburg Peninsula, Paternoster (pop. 1,971) and Jacobsbaai (pop. 416) on the western coast of the peninsula, and Langebaan (pop. 8,297) on the opposite side of Saldanha Bay from Saldanha. In the interior of the municipality is the town of Hopefield (pop. 6,460) and the village and air force base at Langebaanweg (pop. 952).

== Demographics ==
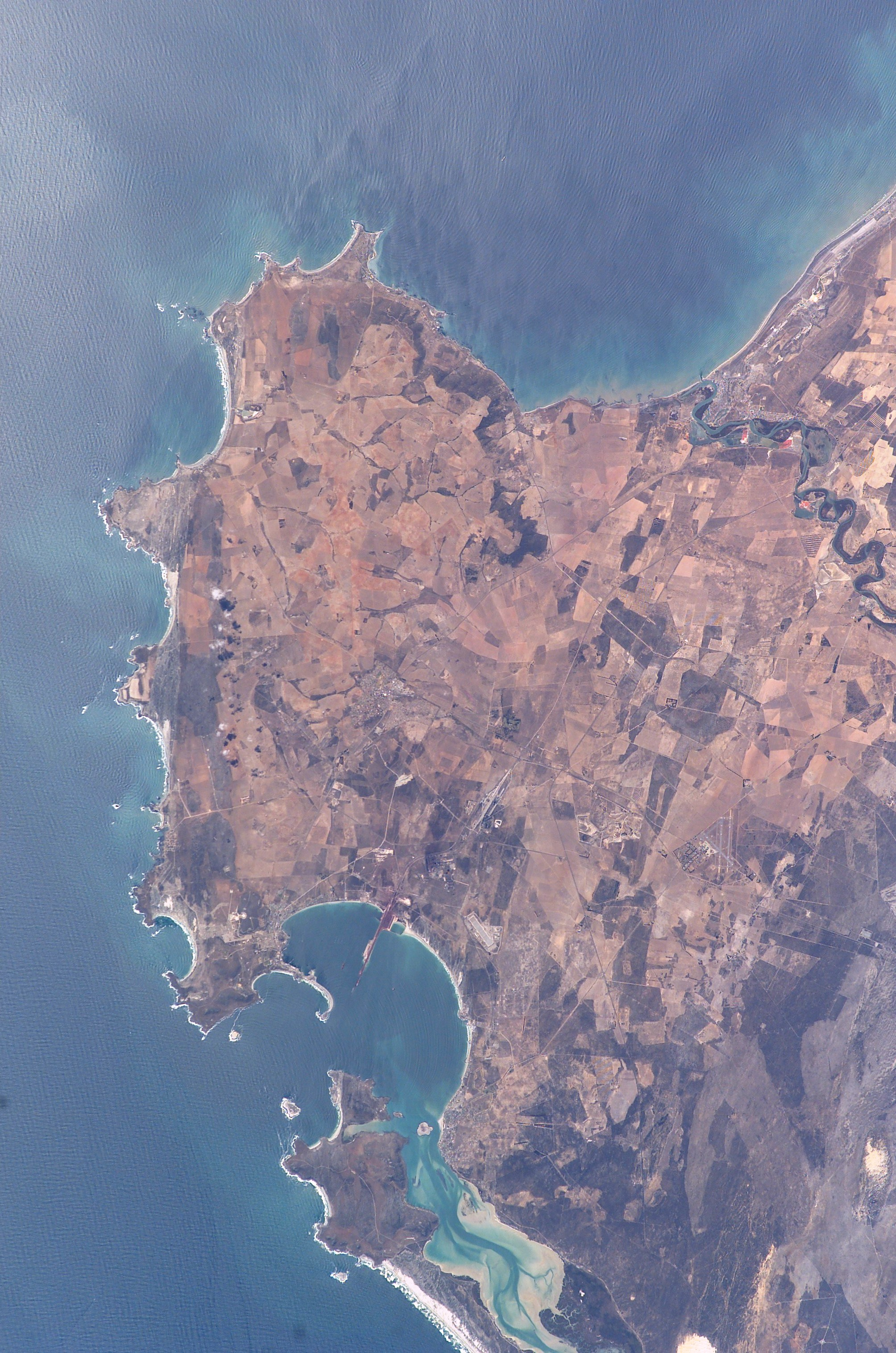
The region around Vredenburg and Langebaan, seen from space

According to the 2022 South African census, the municipality had a population of 154,635 people, with an average annual growth rate of 4.4% between 2011 and 2022.

Gender (2022)
Gender	Population	%
Female	78,195	50.6%
Male	76,440	49.4%
Total	154,635	

Race (2022)
Race	Population	%
Coloured	79,138	51.2%
Black African	46,658	30.2%
White	25,542	16.5%
Indian or Asian	752	0.5%
Other	2,497	1.6%

According to the 2011 census the municipality had a population of 99,193 people in 28,835 households. Of this population, 55.8% describe themselves as "Coloured", 24.5% as "Black African", and 18.0% as "White". The first language of 72.5% of the population is Afrikaans, while 16.4% speak Xhosa, 6.6% speak English and 1.2% speak Sotho.

== Politics ==
The municipal council consists of twenty-seven members elected by mixed-member proportional representation. Fourteen councillors are elected by first-past-the-post voting in fourteen wards, while the remaining thirteen are chosen from party lists so that the total number of party representatives is proportional to the number of votes received.

In the election of 4 November 2026 the Democratic Alliance (DA) obtained a plurality of fifteen seats on the council.

The following table shows the results of the 2026 election.

Party	Ward			List			Total seats
Party	Votes	%	Seats	Votes	%	Seats	Total seats
Democratic Alliance	20,356	48.68	9	20,785	49.54	6	15
Patriotic Alliance	7,945	19.00	3	8,286	19.75	3	6
African National Congress	5,046	12.07	3	5,042	12.02	1	4
Freedom Front Plus	2,345	5.61	0	2,508	5.98	2	2
South African Communist Party	1,565	3.74	0	1,520	3.62	1	1
Good	1,103	2.64	1	1,062	2.53	0	1
uMkhonto weSizwe Party	870	2.08	0	929	2.21	1	1
Economic Freedom Fighters	744	1.78	0	756	1.80	1	1
Independent candidates	437	1.05	0				0
10 other parties	1,406	3.36	0	1,068	2.55	0	0
Total	41,817	100.00	16	41,956	100.00	15	31
Valid votes	41,817	99.33		41,956	99.27		
Invalid/blank votes	280	0.67		310	0.73		
Total votes	42,097	100.00		42,266	100.00		
Registered voters/turnout	76,103	55.32		76,103	55.54		
