= Hopefield Reformed Church =

Church in Hopefield in the Western Cape

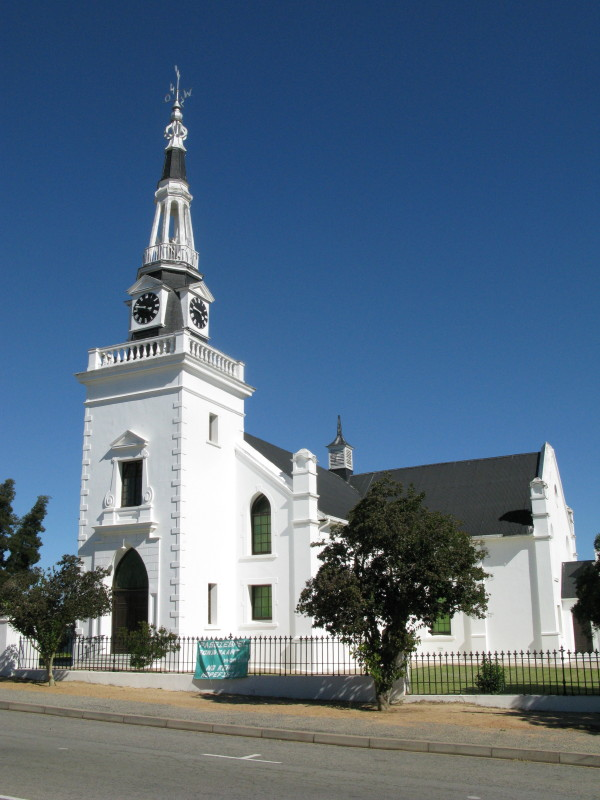

The Hopefield Reformed Church is a congregation of the Dutch Reformed Church in the South African province of Western Cape. The center of gravity of the parish is the Sandveld town of Hopefield. It separated from the Swartland Reformed Church on 13 December 1851 as the 48th congregation in the then Cape Church. In 1902 Vredenburg seceded from Hopefield, in 1957 Saldanha/Langebaan Road and in 1988 Langebaan.

== Ministers ==
- Johannes Henoch Neethling, 1854–1904, died 10 January 1917 at Hopefield
- Johan George Steytler, 1905–1912
- Philippus Albertus Myburgh Brink, 1913–1927
- Christoph Wilhelm Alheit, 1927–1941 (emeritus)
- Andries van der Merwe, 1941–1943
- Johannes Lafras Fourie, 1943–?
- Abraham Jacobus Beukes, 1958–1964
- Jacobus Andries Johannes Kriek, 1964–1969 (Navy Chaplain, Langebaan)
- Lovell Donald Douglas Emslie, 1970–1975
- Gerhard Petrus Stoffberg, 1976–1984
- Steyn Eugene Dippenaar, 1984–2005
