= Jacobsbaai =

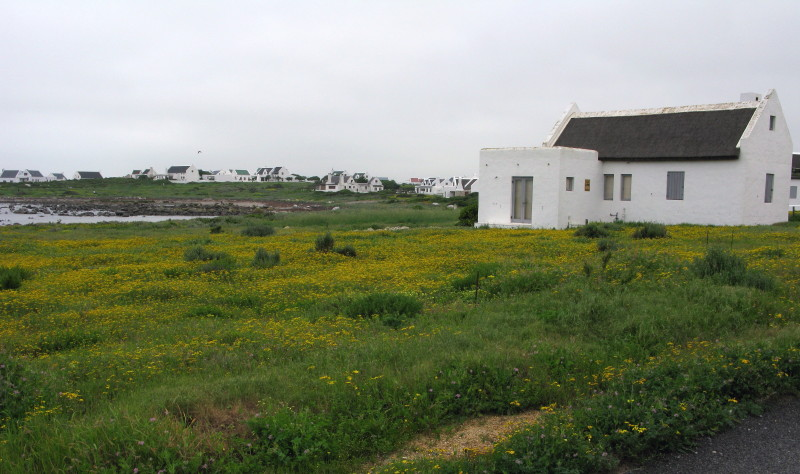
- Jacobsbaai

- Location within Western Cape Location within South Africa
- Coordinates: 32°58′0″S 17°53′25″E
- Country: South Africa
- Province: Western Cape
- District: West Coast
- Municipality: Saldanha Bay

Area
  - Total: 3.43 km^{2} (1.32 sq mi)

Population (2011)
  - Total: 416
  - Density: 121/km^{2} (314/sq mi)

Racial makeup (2011)
  - Black African: 0.5%
  - Coloured: 3.4%
  - Indian/Asian: 1.0%
  - White: 95.2%

First languages (2011)
  - Afrikaans: 87.2%
  - English: 11.8%
  - Other: 1.0%
- Time zone: UTC+2 (SAST)

Jacobsbaai is a settlement in West Coast District Municipality in the Western Cape province of South Africa.

Jacobsbaai was founded as a small town on the farmland registered as 109 Jacobsbaai. The name is said to have come from the Frenchman Jacques Titius. He was a colonial trader in the West Coast. Tietiesbaai is also named after him, and Jacobsbaai has a street called Titius. Another explanation for the name is that the English king entrusted the piece of land to a local known as ‘Jacob', a chief of the Gonneman Hottentots.

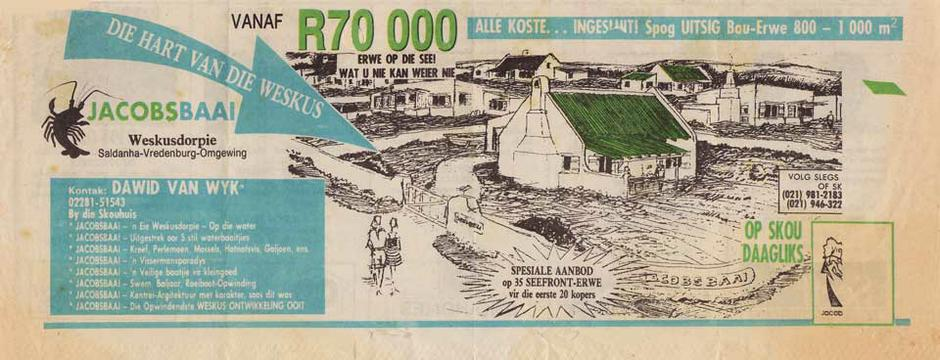
Jacobsbaai advertising effort in 1993

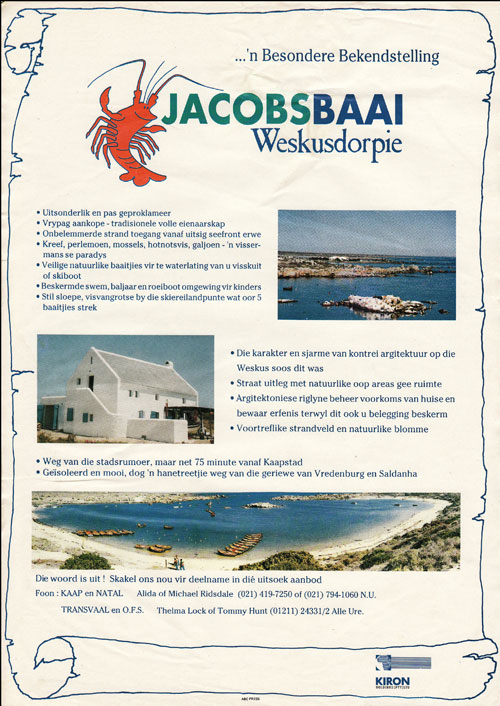
Advertisement placed in 1995
