= Magudu =

- Location within Mpumalanga Location within South Africa
- Coordinates: 25.8934°S 31.7252°E
- Country: South Africa
- Province: Mpumalanga
- District: Ehlanzeni
- Municipality: Nkomazi

Area
  - Total: 5.19 km^{2} (2.00 sq mi)

Population (2011)
  - Total: 4,002
  - Density: 771/km^{2} (2,000/sq mi)

Racial makeup (2011)
  - Black African: 99.6%
  - Coloured: 0.2%
  - Indian/Asian: 0.1%

First languages (2011)
  - Swazi: 95.6%
  - Tsonga: 2.6%
  - Other: 1.8%
- Time zone: UTC+2 (SAST)
- PO box: 3160
- Area code: 034

Magudu is a town in Nkomazi Local Municipality in the Mpumalanga province of South Africa, on the borderline with Eswatini.

Formerly known as Magut, it was named after a Tsonga king of the Khoza/Mavona clan in Mozambique (Magudu Nkanyini).
