= Vredenburg =

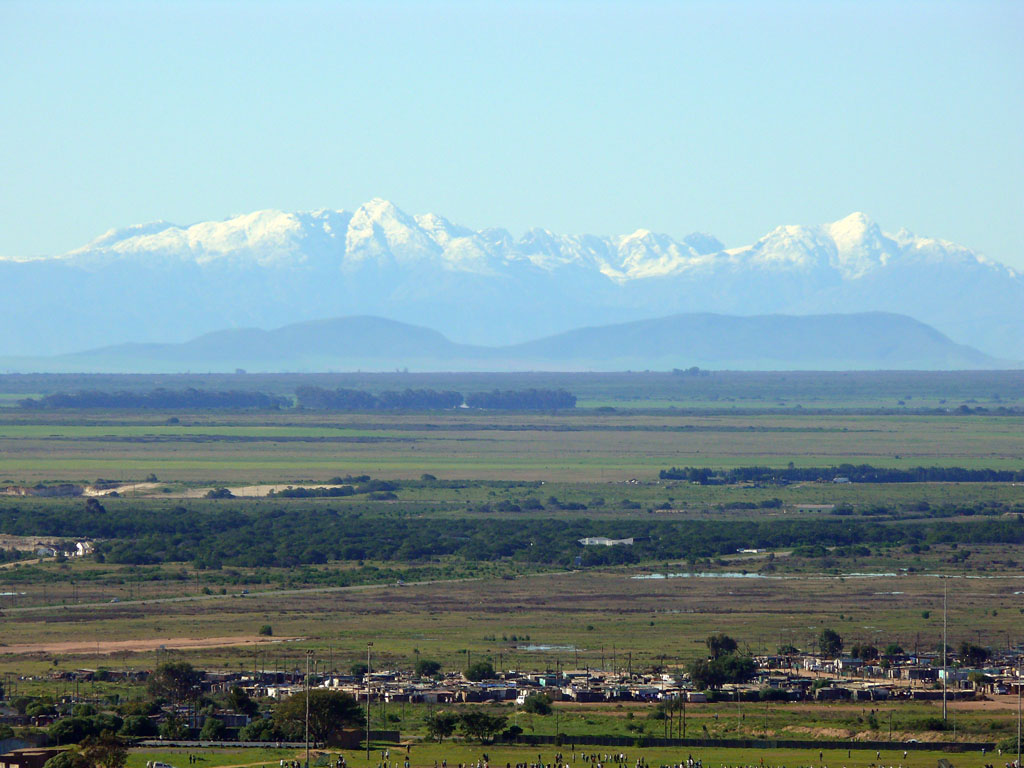
- A landscape in Vredenburg

- Location within Western Cape Location within South Africa
- Coordinates: 32°54′23″S 17°59′45″E
- Country: South Africa
- Province: Western Cape
- District: West Coast
- Municipality: Saldanha Bay
- Established: 1875

Area
  - Total: 13.75 km^{2} (5.31 sq mi)

Population (2011)
  - Total: 38,382
  - Density: 2,791/km^{2} (7,230/sq mi)

Racial makeup (2011)
  - Black African: 28.7%
  - Coloured: 55.7%
  - Indian/Asian: 0.6%
  - White: 13.8%
  - Other: 1.1%

First languages (2011)
  - Afrikaans: 68.7%
  - Xhosa: 19.3%
  - English: 5.0%
  - Sotho: 2.3%
  - Other: 4.8%
- Time zone: UTC+2 (SAST)
- Postal code (street): 7380
- PO box: 7380
- Area code: 022

Vredenburg (locally /ˈfrɪərdənbɜːrɡ/; Afrikaans: [ˈfriədənbœrχ]) is a town of the Cape West Coast in the Western Cape province of South Africa. "Vrede" is Afrikaans for peace. It is the transportation and commercial hub of the West Coast area and administrative centre of the Saldanha Bay Local Municipality. It is located 12 kilometres inland from the coast at Saldanha Bay on the Cape Columbine Peninsula 138 km north of Cape Town.

== History ==
The town was established in 1875 initially as a Dutch Reformed Church congregation to serve the surrounding communities, as the closest church was in Hopefield. The town's original name was "Twisfontein", which from Afrikaans can be translated as "dispute fountain". This name came about when two competing farmers fought over the only available freshwater spring in the area. The town's name was later changed to "Prosesfontein". The town was renamed as they were discussing the matter of the freshwater spring and were trying to come to an agreement. When this agreement was settled and they have achieved a sense of peace among one another, the name "Vredenburg" was chosen. The town's population in 2011 was 38,382. The city should not be confused with the ancient Vredenburg in the Limpopo Province.

== Famous people ==
- Christiaan Bakkes
- Stedman Gans
- Lizaad Williams
