= Setumong =

- Location within Limpopo Location within South Africa
- Coordinates: 23°45′02″S 29°02′48″E
- Country: South Africa
- Province: Limpopo
- District: Capricorn
- Municipality: Polokwane

Area
  - Total: 5.25 km^{2} (2.03 sq mi)
- Elevation: 1,089 m (3,573 ft)

Population (2011)
  - Total: 2,551
  - Density: 486/km^{2} (1,260/sq mi)

Racial makeup (2011)
  - Black African: 99.9%

First languages (2011)
  - Northern Sotho: 96.6%
  - Tsonga: 1.5%
  - Other: 1.9%
- Time zone: UTC+2 (SAST)
- Postal code (street): 0748
- Area code: +27 (0)15

Setumong is a large village in the Polokwane Local Municipality of the Capricorn District Municipality in the Limpopo province of South Africa. It is the capital of the Ga-Matlala tribal chieftaincy and headquarters the Bakone Traditional Council. It is located about 48 km (30 mi) northwest of the city of Polokwane on the Matlala Road.

== Tradition ==
Setumong is an important center of tradition and culture in Ga-Matlala and the Aganang Local Municipality. The majority of the villages in the municipality belong to the Bakone Traditional Council; which, along with the traditional councils of Moletši and Ga-Mašašane, make up the municipal body of traditional affairs.

== Education ==
- Sekgwari Primary School.
- Bakone Primary School.
- Ipopeng high school
- Mogoshi primary school
- BK Matlala Secondary School.

== Notable people ==
- Kgoši Mokgama Maurice Matlala - Chief Minister of the Bantustan of Lebowa from 1972 to 1973.
- Kgošigadi Mmakwena Matlala - Anti-Apartheid Chieftainess of Ga-Matlala.
