= Saldanha, South Africa =

Saldanha
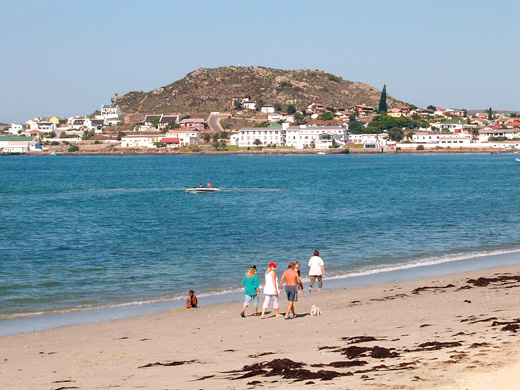
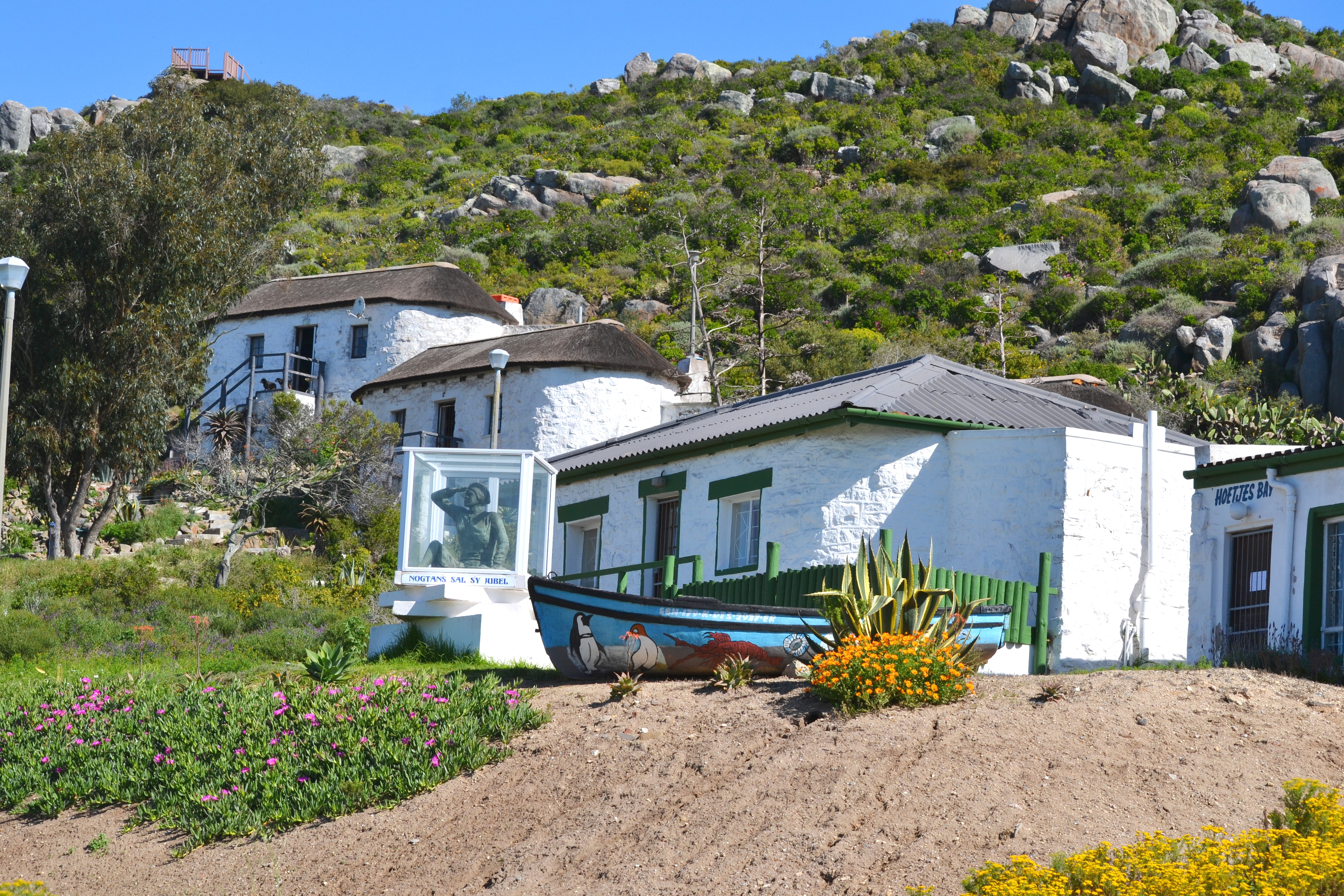
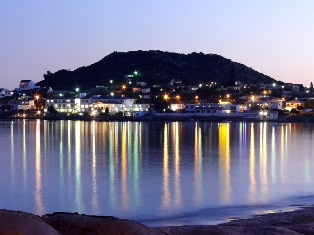
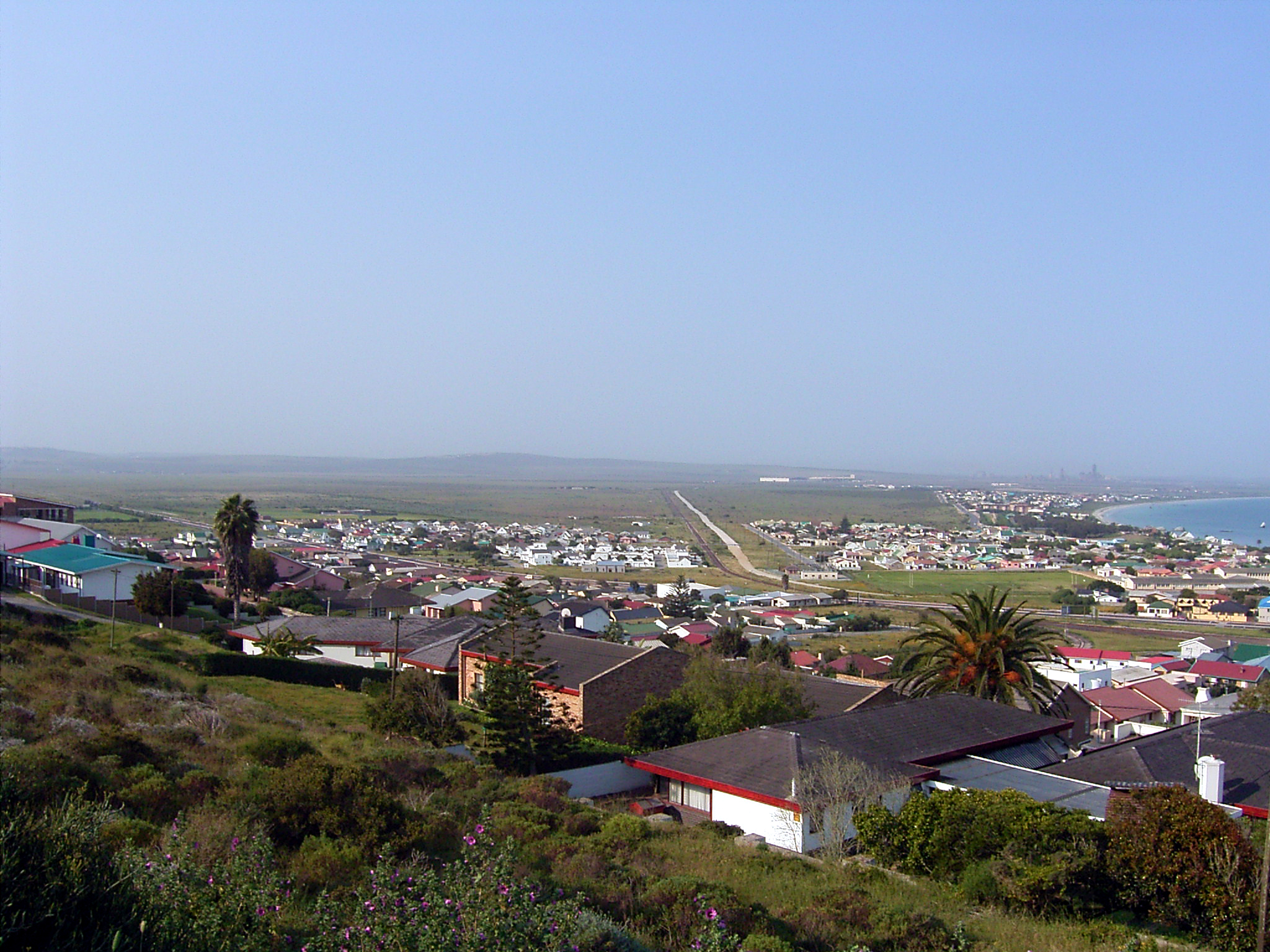
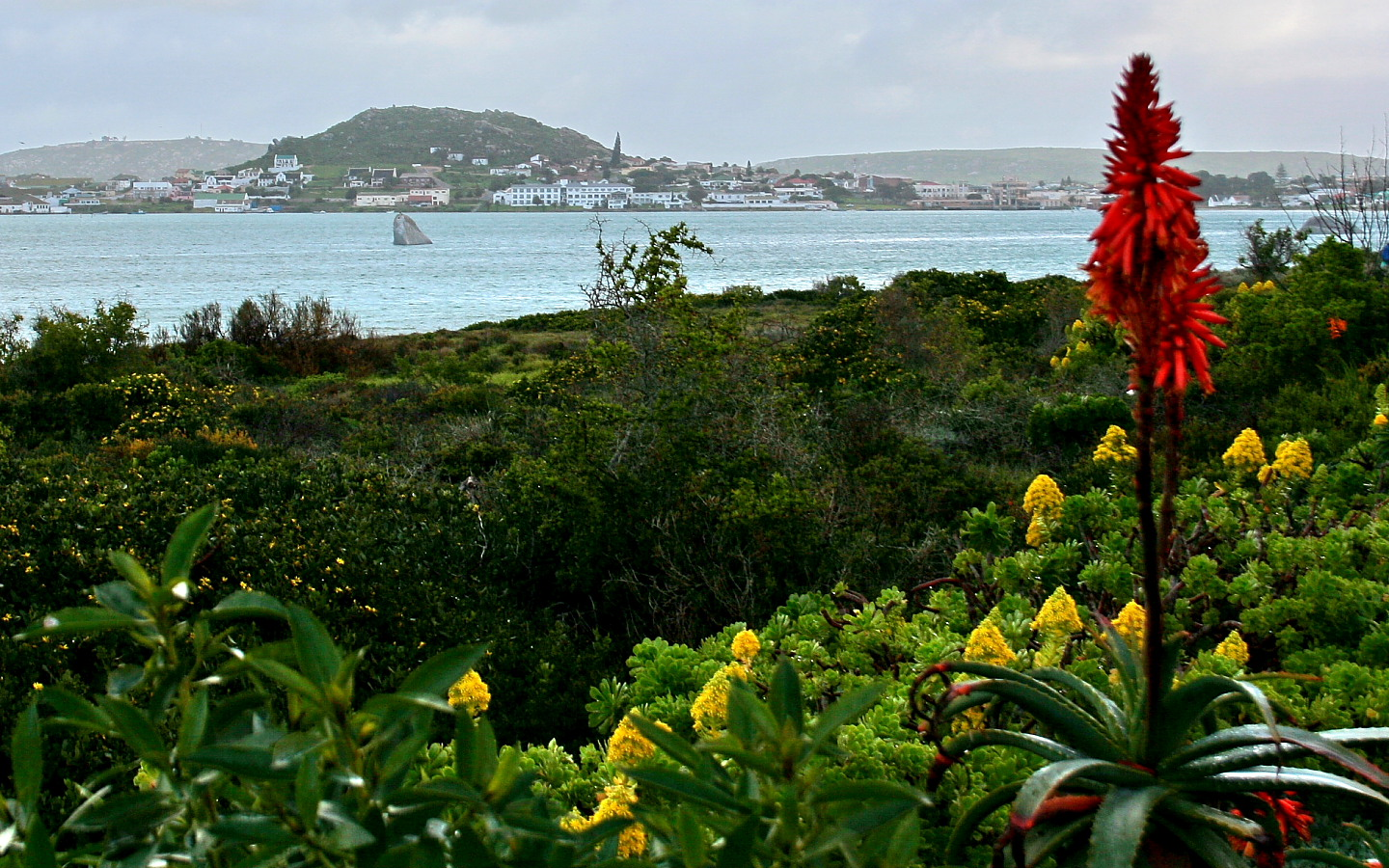
- Clockwise from Top: Saldanha beach, Saldanha at night, indigenous vegetation, view over the town, traditional fishermans cottages

- Location within Western Cape Location within South Africa
- Coordinates: 32°59′52″S 17°56′44″E
- Country: South Africa
- Province: Western Cape
- District: West Coast
- Municipality: Saldanha Bay

Area
  - Total: 17.36 km^{2} (6.70 sq mi)

Population (2011)
  - Total: 28,142
  - Density: 1,621/km^{2} (4,199/sq mi)

Racial makeup (2011)
  - Black African: 29.9%
  - Coloured: 65%
  - Indian/Asian: 1.4%
  - White: 13.5%
  - Other: 0.9%

First languages (2011)
  - Afrikaans: 70.3%
  - Xhosa: 19.6%
  - English: 7.0%
  - Other: 3.1%
- Time zone: UTC+2 (SAST)
- Postal code (street): 7395
- PO box: 7395
- Area code: 022

Saldanha (Afrikaans: [sal'dana]), also known as Saldanha Bay, is a town of 21,636 people, located 110 kilometres (70 mi) north of Cape Town on the northern shore of Saldanha Bay, in the Western Cape province of South Africa. Its situation as a natural sheltered harbour has led to development as a port for the export of iron ore from Sishen in the Northern Cape, which is transported on the Sishen–Saldanha railway line. The port is one of the largest exporting ports of ore in the whole of Africa, and it is able to handle ships as large as 200 000 tons deadweight.

== History ==
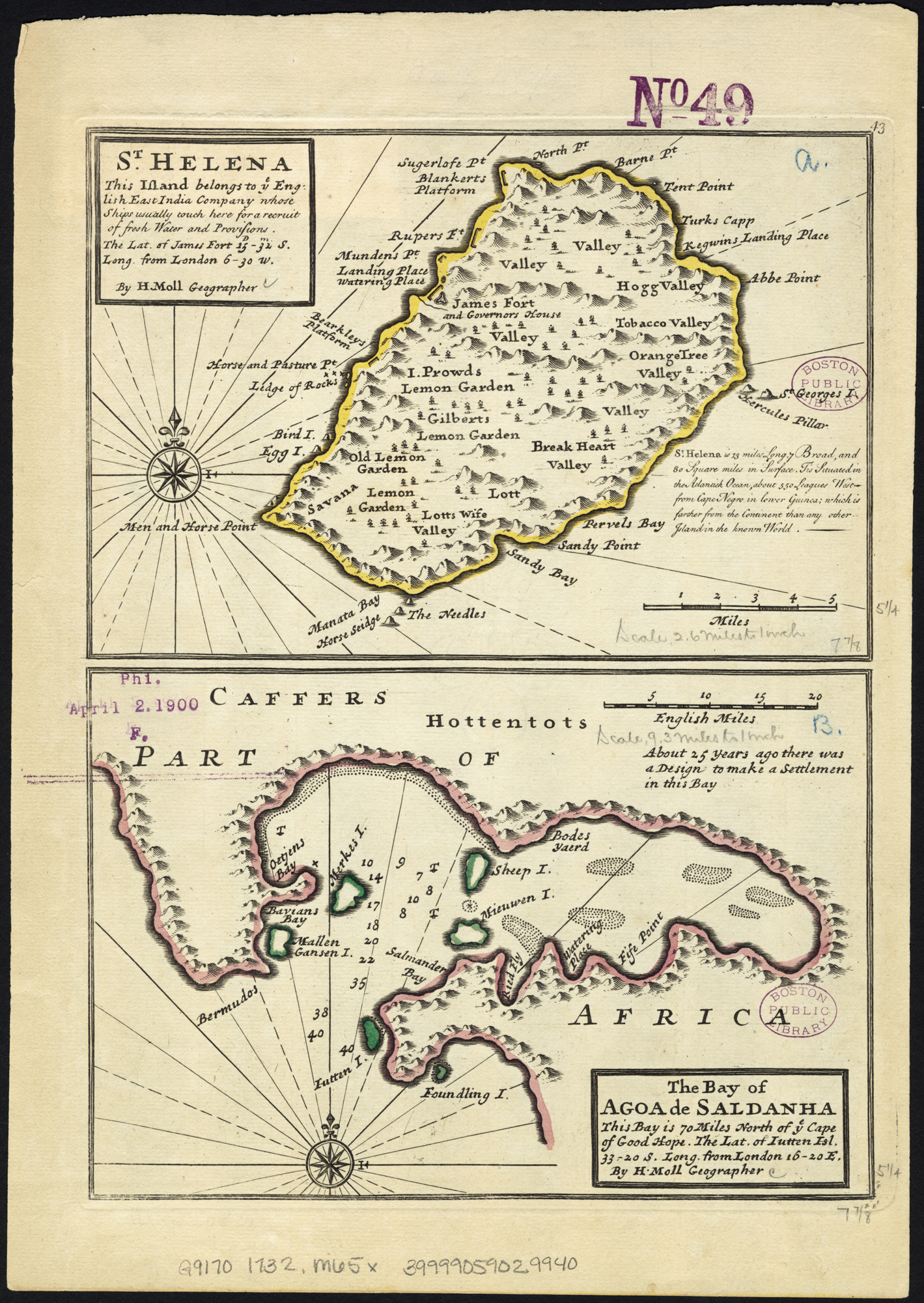
Historic map of Saldanha by the East India Company (bottom).

'Agoada de Saldanha' was the early Portuguese name for Table Bay, but later given to the present location by Joris van Spilbergen, meaning 'watering place of Saldanha'.

Bartolomeu Dias was the first recorded European to set eyes on what is now Saldanha.

Saldanha Bay is ultimately named after António de Saldanha, captain of a vessel in Albuquerque's fleet which visited South Africa in 1503.

== Port ==
The port has handling facilities for both bulk iron ore and crude oil. Ore vessels up to 21.5 metre draft are handled, as well as large crude oil carriers up to 20.5 metre draft.

== Demographics (2011) ==
- Area: 17.36 square kilometres (6.70 sq mi)
- Population: 28,142: 1.621 inhabitants per square kilometre (4.20/sq mi)
- Households: 7,654: 440.81 per square kilometre (1,141.7/sq mi)

Gender	Population	Percentage
Male	14,264	50.69
Female	13,878	49.31
Total	28,142	100

Race	Population	Percentage
Black	8,404	29.9
White	3,811	13.5
Coloured	15,286	54.3
Asian	391	1.4
Other	250	0.9
Total	28,142	100

First language	Population	Percentage
Afrikaans	18,524	70.3
Xhosa	5,176	19.6
English	1,059	7.0
Southern Sotho	1,835	0.78
Tswana	170	0.65
Other	1,360	1.67
Total	28,142	100
